= 2007 Open Canada Cup =

Tournament details
- Country: Canada
- Teams: 14

Final positions
- Champions: Trois-Rivières Attak (1st title)
- Runners-up: Columbus Clan F.C.

Tournament statistics
- Matches played: 14
- Goals scored: 74 (5.29 per match)
- Top goal scorer: (United States) Aaron Byrd (3 goals)

The 2007 Open Canada Cup was the 10th edition of the Canadian Soccer League's open league cup tournament, running from July through early September. Trois-Rivières Attak defeated Columbus Clan F.C. 3-0 in the final played at Cove Road Stadium, London, Ontario. It was the Attak's first Open Canada Cup title and marked the first time in the tournament's history that a Quebec club won. The 2007 tournament was significant as it featured, for the first time professional and amateur teams from Ontario, Quebec, and British Columbia.

The British Columbia teams had their own regional qualifying matches, with the winner of the British Columbia Provincial Soccer Championship, the Columbus Clan F.C., receiving a bye to the semi-finals. All CSL clubs competed in the competition except Toronto Croatia, which opted out in order to compete in the Croatian World Club Championship and the annual Croatian-North American Soccer Tournament. The remaining Ontario clubs were from the Ontario Soccer League, Ottawa Carleton Soccer League, and the Western Ontario Soccer League. With the exception of Trois-Rivières the remaining Quebec club Jean-Talon 2007 represented the Concordia Regional Soccer League. London City were awarded the hosting rights to the semi-final, and final. As the host club London City were given a wild card match if they were defeated in the earlier rounds.

== Qualification ==
Enter in preliminary round	Enter in Second Round	Enter in Third Round	Enter in Semi-final
OSL/CRSL/OCSL/WOSL; 1 teams/1 team/1 team/1 team	CSL; 9 teams		VMSL; 1 team
Ontario Soccer League: Scarborough GS United; Concordia Regional Soccer League: Jean-Talon 2007; Ottawa Carleton Soccer League: Capital City Ambassadors; Western Ontario Soccer League: AEK London	Canadian Soccer League: Canadian Lions; Italia Shooters; North York Astros; Portuguese Supra; Serbian White Eagles; St. Catharines Wolves; Trois-Rivières Attak; Windsor Border Stars	Canadian Soccer League: London City	Vancouver Metro Soccer League: Columbus Clan F.C.

== Open Canada Cup bracket ==
First Round
GS United (p)	1 (3)
AEK London	1 (0)
Jean-Talon 2007	5
Capital City Ambassadors	1

Second Round
Portuguese Supra	2
Canadian Lions	1
St. Catharines Wolves	1
Windsor Border Stars	2
Italia Shooters	2
GS United	0
Serbian White Eagles	3 (4)
North York Astros (p)	3 (5)
Trois-Rivières Attak	3
Jean-Talon 2007	1

Third Round
Portuguese Supra	0
Windsor Border Stars	4
Italia Shooters (Note: Had to play in Wildcard match despite winning)	1
North York Astros	0
Trois-Rivières Attak	6
London City (Note: Qualified for Wildcard match due to hosting rights)	0

Semifinals
September 1 – London, ON
Columbus Clan FC	4
Windsor Border Stars	3
September 1 – London, ON
Italia Shooters	0
Trois-Rivieres Attak	1

Final
September 3 – London, ON
Columbus Clan FC	0
Trois-Rivieres Attak	3

Wildcard
August 31 – London, ON
London City	2
Italia Shooters	4

== Preliminary round (amateur teams) ==
July 1, 2007	Jean-Talon 2007 (CRSL)	5–1	Capital City Ambassadors (OCSL)	Le Plateau-Mont-Royal
10:00 ET	Paul Daccobert 9'; Karl Stephen 65'; Leo Incollingo 78'; Jacob Jacques 87'; Karl Stephen 90'	(Report)	Ali Al-Hajari 6'	Stadium: Jeanne-Mance Park

July 2, 2007	GS United (OSL)	1–1 (a.e.t.) (3–0 p)	AEK London (WOSL)	Brampton, Ontario
2:00 ET	Gus Kouzmanis 36'	(Report)	Mike Pereira 22'	Stadium: Victoria Park Stadium

== Second round ==
June 29, 2007	St. Catharines Wolves (CSL)	1–2 (a.e.t.)	Windsor Border Stars (CSL)	St. Catharines, Ontario
8:15 ET	Antonio Stranges 30'	(Report)	Filip Rocca 62'; Aaron Byrd 95'	Stadium: Club Roma Stadium

July 12, 2007	Portuguese Supra (CSL)	2–1	Canadian Lions (CSL)	Vaughan, Ontario
8:30 ET	Helio Pereira 63'; Yami Williams 86'	(Report)	Evan Milward 30'	Stadium: The Soccer Centre; Attendance: 45; Referee: Mike Winstanley (Ontario)

July 25, 2007	Italia Shooters (CSL)	2–0	GS United (OSL)	Vaughan, Ontario
8:45 ET	Jason De Thomasis 44'; Desmond Humphrey 77'	(Report)		Stadium: The Soccer Centre

July 25, 2007	Serbian White Eagles (CSL)	3–3 (a.e.t.) (4–5 p)	North York Astros (CSL)	Scarborough, Toronto
8:45 ET	Saša Viciknez 76'; Saša Viciknez 80'; Mirko Medić 115'	(Report) (Report)	Selvin Lammie 78'; Paulo Astorga 82'; Paulo Astorga 95'	Stadium: Birchmount Stadium; Referee: Joe Fletcher (Ontario)

July 27, 2007	Trois-Rivières Attak (CSL)	3–1	Jean-Talon 2007 (CRSL)	Montreal, Quebec
9:00 ET	Darko Kolic 14'; Nicolas Lesage 34'; Elkana Mayard 80'	(Report)	Leo Incollingo 63'	Stadium: Complexe sportif Claude-Robillard

== Third round ==
August 4, 2007	Trois-Rivieres Attak (CSL)	6–0	London City (CSL)	Trois-Rivières, Quebec
4:00 ET	Darko Kolic 5'; Jean-Louis Besse 20'; Francois Boivin 64'; Boubacar Coulibaly 67'; Cedric Joqueviel 73'; Francois Boivin 86'	(Report)		Stadium: Stade de l'UQTR

August 6, 2007	Portuguese Supra (CSL)	0–4	Windsor Border Stars (CSL)	Toronto, Ontario
4:00 ET		(Report)	Aaron Byrd 24'; Aaron Byrd 30'; Gino Berardi 39'; Robbie Nelson 66'	Stadium: Centennial Park Stadium; Attendance: 50; Referee: Isaac Raymond (Ontario)

August 6, 2007	Italia Shooters (CSL)	1–0	North York Astros (CSL)	Vaughan, Ontario
7:00 ET	Joshua Jaramillo 46'	(Report)		Stadium: The Soccer Centre; Attendance: 100; Referee: David Barrie (Ontario)

== Wild Card ==
August 31, 2007	London City (CSL)	2–4	Italia Shooters (CSL)	London, Ontario
8:38 ET	Garson Hazel 36'; Roy Beishuizen 80'	(Report)	Kadian Lecky 31'; Joshua Jaramilo 75'; Geron Duporte 78'; Chris Turner 81'	Stadium: Cove Road Stadium

== Semifinals ==
September 1, 2007	Columbus Clan FC (VMSL)	4–3	Windsor Border Stars (CSL)	London, Ontario
5:00 ET	Jonathan Poli 11'; Tiarnan King 21'; Steve De Blasio 75'; Jonathan Poli 93'	(Report)	Worteh Sampson 12'; Radek Papiez 14'; Radek Papiez 55'	Stadium: Cove Road Stadium; Attendance: 100; Referee: Steve DePierro (Ontario)

September 1, 2007	Italia Shooters (CSL)	1–2	Trois-Rivieres Attak (CSL)	London, Ontario
8:38 ET	Chris Turner 16'	(Report)	Mohammed Nafe 42'; Boubacar Coulibaly 48'	Stadium: Cove Road Stadium; Attendance: 100; Referee: Justin Tasev (Ontario)

== Finals ==
September 3
4:00 ET

Columbus Clan F.C.	0–3	Trois-Rivières Attak
	Report	Lesage 60'; Anderson 74', 82'

Cove Road Stadium, London, Ontario
Attendance: 50
Referee: Joe Fletcher (Ontario)

GK	1	(Canada) Geoff Ayi-Bonte	(substituted off) 74'
RB	6	(Canada) Blair Robertson
CB	5	(Canada) Tony Gaita (c)
CB	4	(Canada) Jonathan Poli
LB	7	(Canada) Frank Mollica	(substituted off) 78'
RM	19	(Canada) Carmen D'Onofrio	(substituted off) 78'
CM	23	(Canada) Craig Richards
CM	17	(Canada) Tiarnan King
LM	9	(Canada) Steve Deblasio	(substituted off) 86'
ST	21	(Canada) Tino Cucca	(substituted off) 82'
ST	18	(Canada) Joe Scigliano
Substitutes:
GK	0	(Canada) Carlo Bertelli	(substituted on) 74'
MF	10	(Canada) Gino Gaita	(substituted on) 78'
DF	12	(Canada) Devin Mathews	(substituted on) 78'
DF	14	(Canada) Rob Mascitti
MF	16	(Canada) Sal Cuccione	(substituted on) 82'
FW	20	(Canada) Paul Jordan	(substituted on) 86'
Manager:
(Canada) Carmen D'Onofrio

GK	22	(Canada) Jon Paul Piques	(yellow card) 84' (red card)
RB	2	(Canada) Peter Eustache
CB	5	(France) Cedric Joqueviel
CB	3	(Morocco) Hicham Aaboubou
LB	4	(Canada) Alex Surprenant	(substituted off) 81'
RM	19	(Guinea) Alpha Ibrahim Bah	(substituted off) 88'
CM	17	(Canada) Joe Di Buono	(substituted off) 93'
CM	6	(Mali) Boubacar Coulibaly (c)
LM	20	(England) Danny Anderson	(substituted off) 74'
CF	8	(Ivory Coast) Jean-Louis Besse	(substituted off) 85'
CF	7	(Canada) Ibrahim Baldeh	(substituted off) 51'
Substitutes:
GK	24	(Canada) Vincent Cournoyer	(substituted on) 85'
FW	12	(Canada) Nicolas Lesage	(substituted on) 51'
MF	14	(Canada) Guillaume Barrette	(substituted on) 93'
MF	15	(Canada) Philippe Armand Kamdem	(substituted on) 88'
MF	27	(Canada) Francois Boivin	(substituted on) 81'
Manager:
(Canada) Marc Dos Santos

Assistant referees:
Jon Oliva
Geoff Gamble
Fourth official:
Kyle McIntosh

== Top scorers ==
Position	Player	Club	Goals
1	Aaron Byrd	Windsor Border Stars	3
2	Nicolas Lesage	Trois-Rivières Attak	2
	Darko Kolić	Trois-Rivières Attak	2
	Leo Incollingo	Jean-Talon 2007	2
	Saša Viciknez	Serbian White Eagles	2
	Boubacar Coulibaly	Trois-Rivières Attak	2
	Jonathan Poli	Columbus Clan F.C.	2
	Radek Papiez	Windsor Border Stars	2
