= 2008 Canadian Soccer League season =

Canadian Soccer League
- Season: 2008
- Champions: Serbian White Eagles
- Regular Season title: Italia Shooters (International Division); Trois-Rivières Attak (National Division)
- Matches: 121
- Goals: 419 (3.46 per match)
- Top goalscorer: Daniel Nascimento (18 goals)
- Best goalkeeper: Andrew Olivieri
- Biggest home win: 9–0 Trois-Rivières Attak v Windsor Border Stars
- Biggest away win: 0–7 London City v Brampton Lions; 4–7 London City v Toronto Croatia

The 2008 Canadian Soccer League season was the 11th since its establishment where a total of 16 teams from Ontario and Quebec took part in the league. The season began on May 16, 2008, and ended on October 26 with the Serbian White Eagles claiming their first championship by defeating Trois-Rivières Attak 2-1 in a penalty shootout. This was the third consecutive year the White Eagles had reached the CSL finals losing respectively to Italia Shooters in 2006, and to rivals Toronto Croatia in 2007. While during the regular season Italia won their second division title with Trois-Rivières becoming the first Quebec team to claim the National Division title.

The CSL added another team to the Peel Region after the relocation of the Canadian Lions to Brampton, Ontario to play as the Brampton Lions in the National Division. Toronto FC of the Major League Soccer established a relationship with the league by entering TFC Academy to the National Division, and TFC Academy II to the Reserve Division. Further significant changes introduced by the league was the creation of the 5 team reserve division in the Toronto region to provide a developmental platform for young players in order to make the transition to the professional ranks. The Ontario Soccer Association reached an agreement with the CSL to receive Operational Independence from the provincial governing body. The league received more coverage from Rogers TV which would broadcast a CSL match on Friday nights.

== Changes from 2007 season ==
- The Canadian Lions of the International Division move to the National Division as the Brampton Lions.
- Portuguese Supra change their name to Portugal FC.
- TFC Academy, the U-18 Academy team of Major League Soccer's Toronto FC, and owned by Maple Leaf Sports & Entertainment, enter the National Division.
- Playoff format adjusted to seed division winners as #1 and #2, and the next top six teams seeded #3-#8 irrespective of division.
- The CSL added a 5 team reserve division involving teams in the Toronto region.
- The Ontario Soccer Association grants the CSL 'Operational Independence' from the provincial governing body.
- Rogers TV agreed to broadcast a CSL game of the week Friday night, reaching 800,000 Toronto homes. The final was broadcast across Ontario to 1.5 million households.

== Teams ==
Team	City	Stadium	Manager
Brampton Lions	Brampton, Ontario (Bramalea)	Victoria Park Stadium	Armando Costa
Italia Shooters	Vaughan, Ontario (Maple)	St. Joan Of Arc Turf Field	Carmine Isacco
London City	London, Ontario (Westmount)	Cove Road Stadium	Eddie Edgar
North York Astros	Toronto, Ontario (North York)	Esther Shiner Stadium	Rafael Carbajal
Portugal FC	Toronto, Ontario (Liberty Village)	Lamport Stadium	Jose Testas
Serbian White Eagles	Toronto, Ontario (Etobicoke)	Centennial Park Stadium	Milan Cancarevic
St. Catharines Wolves	St. Catharines, Ontario (Vansickle)	Club Roma Stadium	James McGillivray
TFC Academy	Toronto, Ontario (Liberty Village)	Lamport Stadium	Jason Bent
Toronto Croatia	Mississauga, Ontario	Hershey Centre	Miroslav Buljan
Trois-Rivières Attak	Trois-Rivières, Quebec	Stade de l'UQTR	Marc Dos Santos
Windsor Border Stars	Windsor, Ontario	Windsor Stadium	Pat Hilton

Location of CSL teams outside of Toronto for the 2008 CSL season.
National Division International Division
Location of CSL teams in Toronto for the 2008 CSL season.
National Division International Division

== Final standings ==
=== International Division ===
Pos	Team	Pld	W	D	L	GF	GA	GD	Pts	Qualification
1	Italia Shooters (A, C)	22	13	3	6	50	32	+18	42	Qualification for Playoffs
2	Serbian White Eagles (A, O)	22	12	5	5	43	23	+20	41	Qualification for Playoffs
3	Toronto Croatia (A)	22	11	5	6	40	35	+5	38	Qualification for Playoffs
4	Portugal FC (A)	22	9	7	6	44	31	+13	34	Qualification for Playoffs

Updated to match(es) played on October 5, 2008. Source: http://www.rocketrobinsoccerintoronto.com/reports08/08cslw21.htm
Rules for classification: 1) points; 2) goal difference; 3) number of goals scored.
(A) Advance to a further round; (C) Champions; (O) Play-off winners

=== National Division ===
Pos	Team	Pld	W	D	L	GF	GA	GD	Pts	Qualification
1	Trois-Rivieres Attak (A, C)	22	14	5	3	47	12	+35	47	Qualification for Playoffs
2	North York Astros (A)	22	10	3	9	41	41	0	33	Qualification for Playoffs
3	Brampton Lions (A)	22	8	5	9	47	37	+10	29	Qualification for Playoffs
4	St. Catharines Wolves (A)	22	7	5	10	28	38	−10	26	Qualification for Playoffs
5	Windsor Border Stars	22	7	5	10	31	45	−14	26	
6	TFC Academy	22	6	2	14	26	44	−18	20	
7	London City	22	0	3	19	22	81	−59	3	

Updated to match(es) played on October 5, 2008. Source: http://www.rocketrobinsoccerintoronto.com/reports08/08cslw21.htm
Rules for classification: 1) points; 2) goal difference; 3) number of goals scored.
(A) Advance to a further round; (C) Champions

== 2008 scoring leaders ==
Full article: CSL Golden Boot

Rank	Player	Nationality	Club	Goals
1	Daniel Nascimento	Canada	Brampton Lions	18
2	Andrew Loague	Canada	London City	14
2	Selvin Lammie	Canada	North York Astros	14
4	Dragan Radović	Montenegro	Serbian White Eagles	12
5	Hayden Fitzwilliams	Trinidad and Tobago	Toronto Croatia	11
6	Saša Viciknez	Serbia	Serbian White Eagles	10
6	Danny Amaral	Canada	Portugal FC	10
6	Jonathan Hurtis	France	North York Astros	10
9	Tihomir Maletić	Croatia	Toronto Croatia	9

== CSL 2008 Playoffs ==
QuarterFinals; 10 & 11 October 2008
1	Trois-Rivières Attak	2
8	St. Catharines Wolves	0
4	Toronto Croatia	1
5	Portugal FC	2
2	Italia Shooters	1
7	Brampton Lions	0
3	Serbian White Eagles	2
6	North York Astros	1

SemiFinals; 17 & 18 October 2008
1	Trois-Rivières Attak	7
5	Portugal FC	0
2	Italia Shooters	0
3	Serbian White Eagles	3

CSL Final; 26 October 2008 @ 5:45pm Esther Shiner Stadium, Toronto, Ontario
1	Trois-Rivières Attak	2 (1)
3	Serbian White Eagles (a.e.t./PSO)	2 (2)

=== Quarterfinals ===
October 10, 2008	Italia Shooters	1–0 (a.e.t.)	Brampton Lions	Toronto, Ontario
8:00 ET	Terminesi 114'	(Report)		Stadium: Esther Shiner Stadium; Attendance: 100; Referee: Manuel Orellana (Ontario)

October 10, 2008	Toronto Croatia	1–2	Portugal FC	Mississauga, Ontario
8:00 ET	Tihomir Maletić 16'	(Report)	Mike DiLuca 60'; Amaral 70'	Stadium: Hershey Centre; Referee: Joe Fletcher (Ontario)

October 11, 2008	Trois-Rivières Attak	2–0	St. Catharines Wolves	Trois-Rivières, Quebec
3:00 ET	Bessé 28'; Lesage 65'	(Report)		Stadium: Stade de l'UQTR; Attendance: 1500

October 11, 2008	Serbian White Eagles	2–1 (a.e.t.)	North York Astros	Toronto, Ontario
8:00 ET	Miloš Šćepanović 10'; Alex Braletić 116'	(Report)	Lalli 74'	Stadium: Esther Shiner Stadium; Attendance: 120; Referee: Vito Curalli (Ontario)

=== Semifinals ===
October 17, 2008	Italia Shooters	0–3	Serbian White Eagles	Toronto, Ontario
8:00 ET		(Report)	Budalić 40'; Alex Braletić 62'; Miloš Šćepanović 82'	Stadium: Esther Shiner Stadium; Attendance: 180; Referee: Yusir Rudolf (Ontario)

October 18, 2008	Trois-Rivieres Attak	7–0	Portugal FC	Trois-Rivières, Quebec
3:00 ET	Mohamed Sylla 26', 58'; Mayard 41', 43'; Lesage 75'; Francois Boivin 77'; Hector Contreras 87'	(Report)		Stadium: Stade de l'UQTR; Attendance: 1500

=== CSL Championship ===
October 26
5:45 ET

Trois-Rivieres Attak	2–2	Serbian White Eagles
Nicolas Lesage 70'; Jean-Phillipe Étienne 103'	Report	Alex Braletic 61'; Saša Viciknez 95'
Penalties
Massimo Di Ioia (penalty missed); Alex Surprenant (penalty missed); Andrew Olivieri (penalty scored); Jean-Phillipe Étienne (penalty missed); Davy Uwimana (penalty missed)	1 – 2	Miloš Šćepanović (penalty missed); Mirko Medić (penalty missed); Saša Viciknez (penalty scored); Nenad Stojčić (penalty missed); Dragorad Milićević (penalty scored)

Esther Shiner Stadium, Toronto, Ontario
Attendance: 1200
Referee: Isaac Raymond (Ontario)

GK	1	(Canada) Andrew Olivieri (c)
RB	25	(Canada) Alex Surprenant
CB	21	(Burundi) Davy Uwimana
CB	16	(Canada) Olivier Brett
LB	23	(Canada) Elkana Mayard
RM	10	(Canada) Hector Contreras	(substituted off) 63'
CM	7	(Canada) Ibrahim Baldeh
CM	6	(Canada) Jean Philippe Etienne
LM	17	(Canada) Pierre-Rudolph Mayard	(substituted off) 82'
ST	9	(Guinea) Mohamed Sylla	(substituted off) 107'
ST	8	(Ivory Coast) Jean-Louis Bessé	(substituted off) 73'
Substitutes:
GK	13	(Canada) Gildas Toufilana
DF	3	(Canada) Serge Dinkota
DF	4	(Canada) Michel Vitulano	(substituted on) 107'
DF	5	(Canada) Francois Boivin
MF	20	(Canada) Massimo Di Ioia	(substituted on) 82'
FW	12	(Canada) Nicolas Lesage	(substituted on) 63'
FW	18	(Canada) Guillaume Heroux	(substituted on) 73'
Manager:
(Canada) Marc Dos Santos

GK	25	(Canada) Dan Pelc
RB	14	(Serbia) Uroš Stamatović
CB	4	(Canada) Mark Jankovic
CB	6	(Serbia) Mirko Medić
LB	3	(Serbia) Dragorad Milićević
RM	19	(Saint Kitts and Nevis) Darryl Gomez	(substituted off) 71'
CM	8	(Serbia) Nenad Stojčić
CM	7	(Serbia) Miloš Vučinić	(substituted off) 117'
LM	5	(Canada) Nikola Budalic (c)
FW	10	(Canada) Alex Braletic	(substituted off) 101'
FW	15	(Serbia) Miloš Šćepanović
Substitutes:
GK	28	(Serbia) Marko Petrović
MF	20	(Serbia) Milan Janošević	(substituted on) 101'
MF	21	(Serbia) Aleksandar Radovanović
MF	16	(Saint Vincent and the Grenadines) Caswain Mason
FW	11	(Montenegro) Dragan Radović
FW	9	(Serbia) Saša Viciknez	(substituted on) 71'
FW	2	(Canada) Said Ali	(substituted on) 117'
Manager:
(Serbia) Milan Čančarević

Assistant referees:
David Barrie
Gianni Facchini
Fourth official:
Domenic Scali

== CSL Executive Committee and Staff ==
A list of the 2008 CSL Executive Committee.

Position	Name	Nationality
Commissioner:	Cary Kaplan	(Canada) Canadian
Executive Director:	Stan Adamson	(England) English
Director of Discipline:	Clifford Dell	(Canada) Canadian
Director of Officials:	Tony Camacho	(Portugal) Portuguese
League Coordinator:	Brock Robinson	(Canada) Canadian
Office Manager:	Janet Leonard	(Canada) Canadian

== Individual awards ==
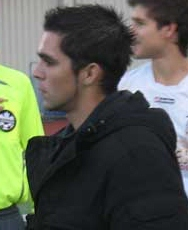
Daniel Nascimento received the MVP and CSL Golden Boot

The annual CSL awards were presented before the CSL Championship final on October 26, 2008. All the awards were taken by the National Division teams with the Brampton Lions, North York Astros, and Trois-Rivières Attak receiving the most awards with 2 wins each. Daniel Nascimento of Brampton was chosen by the league as the MVP, and received the Golden Boot. After recording the best defensive record with Trois-Rivières, former Montreal Impact player Andrew Olivieri was named the Goalkeeper of the Year. Trois-Rivières were also recognized with the Fair Play award for being the most disciplined team throughout the season.

The Defender of the Year was given to Carlos Zeballos of North York. After improving his craft in Europe, Rafael Carbajal returned to the North York Astros to achieve the club's highest finish in their club's history. TFC Academy produced the Rookie of the Year with Adrian Pena. While Isaac Raymond was given the Referee of the Year, and down the road in 2015 was appointed the Manager of Canada's Referee Department for the Canadian Soccer Association.

Award	Player (Club)
CSL Most Valuable Player	Daniel Nascimento (Brampton Lions)
CSL Golden Boot	Daniel Nascimento (Brampton Lions)
CSL Goalkeeper of the Year Award	Andrew Olivieri (Trois-Rivières Attak)
CSL Defender of the Year Award	Carlos Zeballos (North York Astros)
CSL Rookie of the Year Award	Adrian Pena (TFC Academy)
CSL Coach of the Year Award	Rafael Carbajal (North York Astros)
CSL Referee of the Year Award	Isaac Raymond
CSL Fair Play Award	Trois-Rivières Attak

== Reserve Division ==
Canadian Soccer League Reserve Division
- Season: 2008
- Champions: Italia Shooters Reserves
- Matches: 40
- Goals: 155 (3.88 per match)

In 2008, the league formed the Reserve Division to build a developmental structure within the CSL. The previous time a reserve division was in operation was in the 1990 season in the predecessor league. The intentions of the division was to provide clubs with a supply chain of players with additional playing time, and establish a developmental platform for players in order to make the transition to the professional ranks. The original 5 members of the division were from the Greater Toronto Area with a schedule running from June 2, 2008 to October 6, 2008.

=== Teams ===
Team	City	Stadium	Manager
Italia Shooters Reserves	Maple, Ontario	St. Joan Of Arc Turf Field	
North York Astros Reserves	Toronto, Ontario	Esther Shiner Stadium	Volodymyr Klinovsky
Portugal FC Reserves	Toronto, Ontario	Esther Shiner Stadium	
TFC Academy II	Vaughan, Ontario	Ontario Soccer Centre	Stuart Neely
Toronto Croatia Reserves	Mississauga, Ontario	Hershey Centre	

=== Final standings ===
Pos	Team	Pld	W	D	L	GF	GA	GD	Pts
1	Italia Shooters Reserves (C)	16	12	1	3	55	15	+40	37
2	TFC Academy II	16	12	1	3	47	13	+34	37
3	Toronto Croatia Reserves	16	4	4	8	19	36	−17	16
4	North York Astros Reserves	16	4	2	10	18	38	−20	14
5	Portugal FC Reserves	16	3	2	11	16	53	−37	11

Updated to match(es) played on October 6, 2008. Source: https://web.archive.org/web/20090218054554/http://canadiansoccerleague.ca/page.php?page_id=7782
Rules for classification: 1) points; 2) goal difference; 3) number of goals scored.
(C) Champions
