= Nicolas Lesage =

Gabonese footballer (born 1980)

- Lesage in 2007

Personal information
- Full name: Nicolas Lesage Moussavou-Nzamba
- Date of birth: January 3, 1980 (age 46)
- Place of birth: Libreville, Gabon
- Height: 6 ft 1 in (1.85 m)
- Position: Striker

Youth career
- 1999–2004: UQTR Patriotes

Senior career*
Years	Team	Apps	(Gls)
2004	Toledo Slayers	14	(8)
2005	Montreal Impact	0	(0)
2005	Laval Dynamites	6	(5)
2006	Trois-Rivières Sélect	20	(23)
2007–2008	Trois-Rivières Attak	40	(26)
2008	→ Montreal Impact (loan)	1	(0)
2012	L'Assomption	14	(5)
Total		95	(77)

International career
2013	Québec	2	(0)
- * Club domestic league appearances and goals

Nicolas Lesage (born January 3, 1980) is a Gabonese retired footballer who played as a striker. He played at international level with the Quebec national soccer team.

== Club career ==
=== Early career ===
Lesage played college soccer with the UQTR Patriotes for five years. During his university career, his achievements were being named a member of the CIS All-Star Team for three years. In his final season with the Patriotes, he finished fourth in the overall CIS scoring charts with 13 goals.

After the completion of his college career, he was invited along with Jean-Louis Bessé to the Toledo Slayers preseason training camp in 2004. He would ultimately play with the team in the USL Premier Development League. In his debut season in the PDL, he appeared in 14 matches and recorded 8 goals.

=== Montreal Impact ===
In early 2005, before the commencement of the regular season, he played in several preseason matches for the Montreal Impact of the USL First Division. On April 23, 2005, Montreal signed Lesage along with Kevin Wilson to a contract. The primary reason behind his signing was to fill the void left by striker Frederick Commodore who received a career-ending injury.

Two months later, he was loaned to play in the Canadian Professional Soccer League with Laval Dynamites. He recorded his first two goals on July 24, 2005, against Hamilton Thunder. He helped Laval secure a playoff berth by finishing third in the Eastern Conference.

=== Trois-Rivières ===
In 2006, he played in the Ligue de Soccer Elite Quebec, the province's regional circuit with his hometown club Trois-Rivières Sélect. He finished the season as the league's top goalscorer with 23 goals and assisted in securing the regular-season title.

He returned to the interprovincial CPSL (later renamed Canadian Soccer League) the following season but remained in his hometown as Laval Dynamites were relocated and renamed Trois-Rivières Attak. He made his Attak debut against Toronto Croatia in a 0–0 tie on May 13, 2007. He helped the team record their first victory on May 20, 2007, when he scored a goal against the Canadian Lions. Lesage contributed significantly to Trois-Rivières' successful debut in the Open Canada Cup tournament, where he recorded a goal in the finals against Columbus Clan F.C., which marked the first time a team from Quebec captured the title.

Throughout the regular season, he helped Trois-Rivières achieve an 18-game undefeated streak and clinched a postseason berth by finishing second in the National Division. As the Attak entered the playoffs, Lesage scored the first goal in a 3–0 victory that eliminated defending champions Italia Shooters in the quarterfinal round. Their playoff run ended on October 21, 2007, against the Serbian White Eagles, with two first-half goals he scored in the 84 minute to bring life to the Attak, but Serbia hung on and advanced to the finals. Individually, he also had a successful season as he finished as the league's leading scorer in all competitions.

On February 12, 2008, Lesage extended his contract with the Attak for the 2008 season. For the second consecutive season, he finished as the club's top goalscorer with 8 goals along with Pierre-Rudolph Mayard. He also helped the Attak claim their first divisional title, the National Division title. In the opening round of the playoffs, he scored the winning goal against St. Catharines Wolves in a 2–0 victory. In the semi-final match, Lesage contributed a goal in the 75th minute in a 7–0 victory over Portugal FC, and for the first time, the Attak advanced into the CSL Championship to face the Serbs. In the finals, he came off the bench to score in the 70th minute and tie the game 1–1. After both teams equalized in extra time, the game went into penalties, where the White Eagles won the match 2–1.

In 2009, the club began to change its philosophical approach and begin to transition into a developmental system for its parent club the Montreal Impact. The result of these changes saw less recruitment of players from the Trois-Rivières region and more from Montreal. Lesage was welcomed to continue with the club but declined to sign on.

=== Return to Montreal ===
In 2008, the Montreal Impact was experiencing a shortage of players due to injuries and suspensions, and as a result, Lesage was called up to fill in. He would make his debut for Montreal on June 4, 2008, against Miami FC.

In 2012, he played in the newly formed Première Ligue de soccer du Québec with FC L'Assomption.

== International career ==
When the Quebec national soccer team was formed in 2013 head coach Patrick Leduc invited Lesage to the team camp in hopes of participating in the 2013 International Peoples, Cultures, and Tribes Tournament. He was selected for the tournament and helped Quebec make the semifinal but was eliminated by Kurdistan Region. He appeared in two matches throughout the tournament.

== Managerial career ==
Lesage became a senior coach in the Mauricie Regional Soccer Association in 2010.

== Honours ==
Trois-Rivières Attak

- Open Canada Cup: 2007
- Canadian Soccer League National Division: 2008
- CSL Championship runner-up: 2008

Individual

- Canadian Soccer League MVP Award: 2007
- CSL Golden Boot: 2007
- Voyageurs Golden Shoe: 2007
