= Massimo Di Ioia =

Canadian soccer player

Personal information
- Full name: Massimo Di Ioia
- Date of birth: June 18, 1987 (age 39)
- Place of birth: Saint-Léonard, Quebec, Canada
- Height: 5 ft 9 in (1.75 m)
- Position: Striker

Youth career
- 2000–2002: Vanier College
- 2003–2005: CSE Montreal-Concordia
- 2009–2013: LaSalle College
- 2013–2015: McGill Redmen

Senior career*
Years	Team	Apps	(Gls)
2006–2009	Montreal Impact	24	(1)
2007–2008	→Trois-Rivières Attak (loan)	21	(5)
2010	Carolina RailHawks U-23's	12	(4)
2011–2012	FC St-Léonard	16	(8)

International career
2005–2007	Canada U-20	12	(4)
2008	Canada U-23	2	(0)

Managerial career
- 2012–2013: LaSalle Minor Soccer Association (Technical Coordinator)
- 2012–2013: ARS Lac Saint Louis (Technical Coordinator)
- 2013–2014: Lakeshore SC (Technical Coordinator)
- 2012–2015: Montreal Impact Academy
- 2016-2017: Montreal Impact
- * Club domestic league appearances and goals

Massimo Di Ioia (born June 18, 1987 in Saint-Léonard, Quebec) is a Canadian former soccer player. Di Ioia was part of the Canadian National Under 20 team and Olympic Under 23 team. He played the majority of his career in the Canadian province of Quebec with notable stints in the Ligue de Soccer Elite Quebec, USL First Division, Canadian Soccer League, and the Première Ligue de soccer du Québec.

He was most recently part of the Montreal Impact Major League Soccer technical staff that led the team for the first time in club history to the 2016 MLS Cup Playoffs Eastern Conference Finals.

== College career ==
Di Ioia played college soccer with the McGill Redbirds.

== Club career ==
He began playing in the Ligue de Soccer Elite Quebec for CSE Montreal-Concordia in 2003. Where he won a bronze medal at the Canadian National Championship games and he received the Golden boot for scoring the most goals in a season. He joined the National Training Centre in 2005 where he won the bronze medal at the Canada Games in 2005, scoring one goal in a 5-2 victory against British Columbia, as well won the gold medal at the Adidas Cup.

On May 9, 2006 he signed a one-year contract with the Montreal Impact in the USL First Division. He debuted on May 13, 2006, against Charleston Battery, coming into the game for Patrick Leduc at the 83rd minute. He scored his first career goal on July 21, 2006 in Minnesota, giving the Impact a 1-0 lead, but Montreal ended up losing 2-1 to the Thunder. In the end of the 2006 season he was able to help Montreal win the regular-season title as well as the Voyageurs Cup. The following season Di Ioia featured little in the first team, where he only appeared in eight games and started in only one match. As a result played with Montreal's farm team the Trois-Rivières Attak in the Canadian Soccer League.

During his tenure with the Attak, he won the National Division title, and appeared in 16 matches and recorded 5 goals. He featured in the CSL Championship final against the Serbian White Eagles FC, where Trois-Rivières were defeated 2-1 in a penalty shootout. In 2010, he played with Carolina RailHawks U-23's in the USL Premier Development League. He played two seasons in the Première Ligue de soccer du Québec with FC St-Léonard.

== International career ==
Di Ioia played in the 2005 Francophone games in Niger with Canada. He made his debut with the Canada U-20 men's national soccer team in 2006, starting both games played against the United States U-20 men's national soccer team on July 7 in Toronto which resulted in 2-1 loss, and July 9 in Kingston, Ontario which ended in 1-1 tie. Di Ioia started in both games vs Belgium ( 2-1 loss, 1-1 draw), came on as a sub vs the Czech Republic and started again in an international friendly vs the United States U-20 men's national soccer team in Bradenton, Florida.

== Coaching career ==
He founded the Massimo Di Ioia Soccer Academy in Canada. He worked besides his playing career as Technical Director for LaSalle Minor Soccer Association, ARS Lac Saint Louis, Lakeshore Soccer Club, and Brampton Soccer Club. Since 2014 worked as coach on the Academy of Montreal Impact. On January 7, 2016, he was elevated to the first team coaching staff in the Major League Soccer under Mauro Biello.

== Honors ==
Montreal Impact

- Commissioner's Cup: 2006
- Voyageurs Cup: 2006, 2007

Trois-Rivières Attak

- Canadian Soccer League National Division: 2008
- CSL Championship runner-up: 2008
