= Milan Janošević =

Serbian footballer (born 1980)

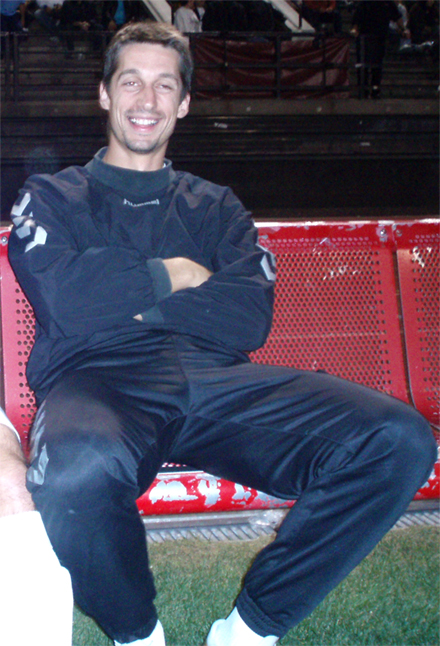
- Janošević in 2007

Personal information
- Full name: Milan Janošević
- Date of birth: April 3, 1980 (age 46)
- Place of birth: Raška, SFR Yugoslavia
- Position: Midfielder

Senior career*
Years	Team	Apps	(Gls)
2001–2002	Zeta	5	(0)
2003–2004	Bane		
2004	Njarðvík	15	(1)
2005	Völsungur	16	(0)
2006–2011	Serbian White Eagles		
- * Club domestic league appearances and goals

Milan Janošević (Serbian Cyrillic: Милан Јаношевић; born April 3, 1980) is a Serbian former footballer who played in the First League of FR Yugoslavia, Úrvalsdeild, and Canadian Soccer League.

== Playing career ==
Janošević began his career in 2001 with FK Zeta in the First League of FR Yugoslavia, and had a stint with FK Bane. In 2005, he went abroad to Iceland to play in the Úrvalsdeild with Knattspyrnudeild Keflavík. In 2006, he signed with the Serbian White Eagles FC of the Canadian Soccer League. In his debut season he won the International Division title, and featured in the CSL Championship final against Italia Shooters. He claimed his first championship in 2008 against Trois-Rivières Attak. During his tenure with Serbia he won 3 division titles, and 1 championship.

== Honours ==
Serbian White Eagles

- CSL Championship (1): 2008
- Canadian Soccer League International Division (3): 2006, 2007, 2009
