= Cristian Nuñez (soccer, born 1988) =

Canadian soccer player

Personal information
- Full name: Cristian Adolfo Nuñez López
- Date of birth: July 7, 1988 (age 38)
- Place of birth: Montreal, Quebec, Canada
- Height: 5 ft 10 in (1.78 m)
- Position: Midfielder

Youth career
- 2005: NTC Ontario
- 2006: Montreal Concordia

College career
Years	Team	Apps	(Gls)
2009–2010	Montreal Carabins	11	(0)

Senior career*
Years	Team	Apps	(Gls)
2007	Lyn Oslo	0	(0)
2007	Toronto FC	0	(0)
2008–2009	Montreal Impact	1	(0)
2008	→ Trois-Rivières Attak (loan)	12	(2)
2012–2013	AS Blainville	22	(3)
2014	FC L'Assomption-Lanaudière	9	(0)

International career
2005	Canada U19	3	(0)
2007	Canada U20	2	(0)
- * Club domestic league appearances and goals

Cristian Adolfo Nuñez López (born 7 July 1988) is a Canadian former professional soccer player.

== Career ==
Nuñez played AAA minor soccer with Montreal-Concordia from U13 to U18 where he received the Ballon d'Or Trophy from the Quebec Elite Soccer League. While playing for NTC Ontario Nuñez won the silver medal at the Canadian U15 selection championships in 2003. In the following season he won the gold medal.

Nuñez signed his first professional contract with FC Lyn Oslo in July 2006. He did not feature in a single match due to visa issues. Which resulted in him remaining four months with the club. In 2007 Nuñez signed with newly expansion Toronto FC where he didn't play a single match in the regular season. He played 13 games for the Toronto FC reserve team, where he tallied one assist against the New England Revolution reserve squad.

The following season Nuñez was released from Toronto FC and signed with the Montreal Impact of the USL First Division. Soon after he was loaned to Montreal's farm team Trois-Rivières Attak in the Canadian Soccer League. He made his debut on May 31, 2008 against St. Catharines Wolves. Nuñez helped the Attak claim the club's first National Division title, and reached the final of the CSL Cup, where they were defeated by Serbian White Eagles by a score of 2-1 in a penalty shootout.

During February 2009, Nuñez had a trial with Bohemian F.C. of Dublin. In 2009, he played with Montreal Carabins. In 2012, he signed with AS Blainville in the newly formed Première Ligue de soccer du Québec.

== International career ==
Nuñez was part of the Canada U-20 men's national soccer team, which took part in the 2007 FIFA World Youth Championship. Played the first two games against Chile and Austria. He played futsal by the QCSL World Cup 2010.

== Personal life ==
Nuñez was born to an Argentine father and a Nicaraguan mother and studied Arts and Sciences at the Université de Montréal.
