= Daniel Anderson =

Daniel Anderson may refer to:

- Daniel Anderson (musician) (born 1986), member of the band Idiot Pilot
- Daniel Anderson (rugby league) (born 1967), Australian rugby league coach
- Daniel J. Anderson (1945–2023), American ceramic artist and teacher
- Daniel P. Anderson, Presiding Judge of the Wisconsin Court of Appeals
- Daniel R. Anderson (born 1944), American psychologist
- Daniel L. Anderson (born 1968), American politician
- Daniel Anderson (poet) (born 1964), American poet and educator
- Danny Anderson (born 1979), Canadian soccer player

== See also ==
- Dan Anderson (disambiguation)
- Daniel Andersson (disambiguation)
