= Niki Budalić =

Canadian soccer player

Niki Budalic
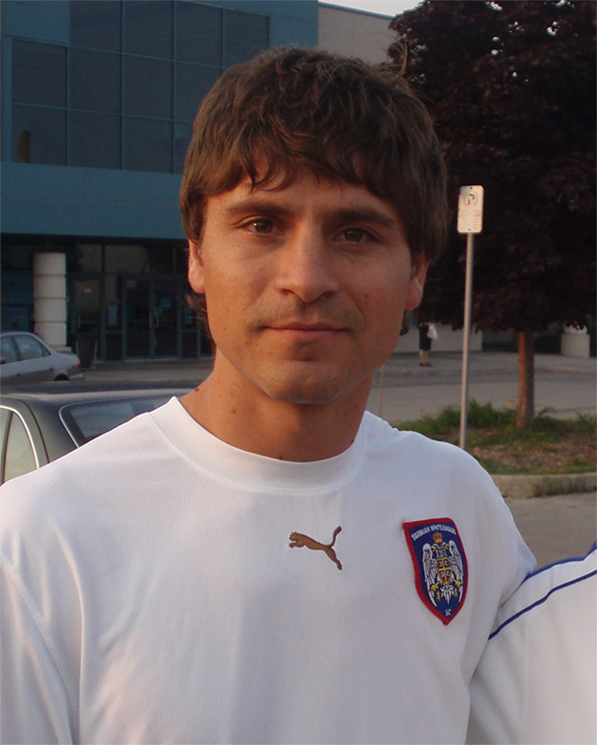
- Budalic in 2007

Personal information
- Full name: Nikola Budalic
- Date of birth: August 1, 1978 (age 48)
- Place of birth: Kitchener, Ontario, Canada
- Height: 5 ft 10 in (1.78 m)
- Position: Attacking midfielder

Team information
- Current team: Inter Miami (director of soccer operations)

Youth career
- 1997–2000: James Madison Dukes
- 2000–2001: Wilfrid Laurier Golden Hawks

Senior career*
Years	Team	Apps	(Gls)
2001	Glen Shields Sun Devils	10	(1)
2002	Toronto Lynx	22	(12)
2003	Örebro	5	(0)
2004	Montreal Impact	9	(0)
2004–2005	Haugesund	31	(2)
2006–2009	Serbian White Eagles	31	(6)
2007	→ Toronto FC Reserves (loan)	2	(1)
2013–2014	K-W United	2	(0)
Total		112	(22)

Managerial career
- 2010: Serbian White Eagles
- * Club domestic league appearances and goals

Nikola “Niki” Budalic (born August 1, 1978) is a Canadian retired soccer player who currently serves as a director of soccer operations for Inter Miami.

== Club career ==
Budalic began his soccer career at the college level with the James Madison University. In 2001, he was selected by the Toronto Lynx in the first round of the USL A-League 2001 College Draft, but decided to continue his education back home at Wilfrid Laurier University where he led the Wilfrid Laurier Golden Hawks to the CIS championship. After the college season came to a conclusion, he played with the Glen Shields Sun Devils in the Canadian Professional Soccer League.

In 2003, he signed a contract with the Toronto Lynx. He made his debut on April 20, 2002, against the Pittsburgh Riverhounds. He recorded his first goal on April 26, 2002, against the Richmond Kickers in a 1–1 draw. In his rookie season, he nearly helped the Lynx qualify for the postseason, but a tie in the final game of season against Atlanta Silverbacks made the Charlotte Eagles take the final playoff spot. He finished the season with twelve goals and was named Team of the Week three times. The club also recognized him with their Best Offensive Player award, and was also named the A-League Rookie of the Year.

Just weeks before the start of the 2003 season, the Lynx announced Budalic had been transferred to Örebro in the Swedish First Division, where he was re-united with former Lynx player Chris Pozniak. He was also named to the Canada national soccer team roster for a friendly against Germany, but did not feature in the match.

In 2004, he returned to Canada to sign with Montreal Impact. During his tenure with Montreal, he had difficulty getting sufficient playing time with the competition of well-established strikers. He was later transferred to Haugesund where he helped the club win promotion to the Adeccoligaen in 2005. In 2006, he was released by Haugesund, which marked his return to Canada to sign with the Serbian White Eagles of the Canadian Soccer League. In his debut season, he assisted the club in clinching the International Division title. He featured in the CSL Championship match against Italia Shooters, but lost the game to a score of 1–0.

He featured in the championship match against rivals Toronto Croatia, but suffered a 4–1 defeat on goals on aggregate. On September 17, 2007, Budalic played a game for the Toronto FC reserve team against the Real Salt Lake reserve team, and scored a goal in the 22nd minute. In 2008, he was named team captain of the Serbian White Eagles for the 2008 season. He helped secure a postseason by finishing second in their division. In the playoffs, he recorded a goal in a 3–0 victory against Italia. For the third straight year he reached the championship final against the Trois-Rivières Attak, where Serbia claimed their first championship in a 2–1 victory in a penalty shootout.

In 2009, he assisted Serbia in securing their third division title and reached the championship final for the fourth time, but were defeated by the Attak in a penalty shootout. The following year, he retired from competitive soccer in order to coach the White Eagles. He briefly returned to soccer in 2013 to play with K-W United in the USL Premier Development League.

== Managerial career ==
After his retirement from soccer he was appointed the head coach of the Serbian White Eagles on 13 September 2010.

Budalic served as director of soccer operations for K-W United, leading the team to the PDL championship in 2015. He was also an assistant coach for the women's and men's soccer teams at Wilfrid Laurier University and director of football for Beswicks Sports North America before joining Orlando City on 26 January 2016, as an assistant general manager, where he had to report directly to founder and president Phil Rawlins. On 14 December 2016, he was promoted to general manager, soccer operations at Orlando City, Orlando Pride and Orlando City B. He left the club in late November 2018.

Budalic then joined Inter Miami as a director of soccer operations on 8 January 2019.

== Head coaching statistics ==
Coaching record by team and tenure
Team	Nat	From	To	Record								Ref
Team	Nat	From	To	G	W	D	L	GF	GA	GD	Win %	Ref
Serbian White Eagles	Canada	13 September 2010	17 October 2010	7	3	3	1	8	4	+4	42.86	

== Honours ==
=== Player ===
Serbian White Eagles

- CSL Championship: 2008
- Canadian Soccer League International Division: 2006, 2007, 2009
