= Said Ali =

Jordanian footballer (born 1980)

Personal information
- Full name: Said Ali
- Date of birth: August 26, 1980 (age 46)
- Place of birth: Jordan
- Height: 6 ft 1 in (1.85 m)
- Position: Striker

Youth career
- 2002–2003: Robert Morris Colonials

Senior career*
Years	Team	Apps	(Gls)
2004	Pittsburgh Riverhounds	18	(15)
2005	Vancouver Whitecaps FC	5	(0)
2005	Toronto Lynx	15	(0)
2008	Serbian White Eagles		
2010	Hamilton Croatia	13	(1)

International career
1994–1995	Jordan U-16		
- * Club domestic league appearances and goals

Said Ali (Arabic: سعيد علي; born October 26, 1980) is a Jordanian-Canadian former footballer who began his career in 2004 with Pittsburgh Riverhounds in the USL Pro Select League. After a successful season in the USL Pro Select League he managed to play in the USL First Division with the Vancouver Whitecaps, and the Toronto Lynx. He would later conclude his career in the Canadian Soccer League with the Serbian White Eagles, and Hamilton Croatia.

== Playing career ==
=== College soccer ===
Ali began playing soccer at the college level in 2002 while attending Robert Morris University. In his first season with Robert Morris he was named to the All-Northeast Conference first team after contributing 11 goals and 3 assists. The following season he netted in 13 goals and recorded four assists, and for the second consecutive year was named to the All-Northeast Conference first team.

=== Professional career ===
In 2004, he transitioned to the professional realm after signing with Pittsburgh Riverhounds in the USL Pro Soccer League. Where in his rookie season he finished as the team's top goalscorer with 15 goals, and finished second in league scoring. He helped Pittsburgh win their first Conference title, but were eliminated in the semifinals by the Charlotte Eagles. Once the season came to a conclusion Ali was named the USL Pro Soccer League Rookie of the Year, and throughout the season he was also named to the PSL Team of the Week eight times including Player of the Week once. On February 8, 2005 the Vancouver Whitecaps FC announced the signing of Ali to a one-year deal with an option. Throughout the season he made minimal appearances, and as a result was traded midway through the season to the Toronto Lynx in return for Josue Mayard.

During his tenure in Toronto he featured in 15 matches, and recorded an assist. In 2008, he featured in the Canadian Soccer League with the Serbian White Eagles FC. He contributed by assisting the White Eagles in claiming their first CSL Championship by defeating the Trois-Rivières Attak 2-1 on penalties. In 2010, he played with Hamilton Croatia, and made his debut for the club on May 15, 2010 in a match against TFC Academy. He recorded his first goal for the club on June 25, 2010 in 6-1 victory over St. Catharines Wolves.

== Personal life ==
Ali was born in Jordan, and played with the Jordan national under-16 football team from 1994 until 1995. He immigrated to Canada in 1996 where he settled in Hamilton, Ontario, and became a citizen in 1998.

== Honours ==
=== Player ===
Serbian White Eagles

- CSL Championship:

2008
