= Jean-Louis Bessé =

Ivorian footballer (born 1980)

- Bessé in 2007

Personal information
- Full name: Valery Jean-Louis Bessé
- Date of birth: July 5, 1980 (age 46)
- Place of birth: Abidjan, Ivory Coast
- Height: 1.85 m (6 ft 1 in)
- Position: Midfielder

College career
Years	Team	Apps	(Gls)
2004–2006	UQTR Patriotes		

Senior career*
Years	Team	Apps	(Gls)
2006	Trois-Rivières Sélect	13	(11)
2006	Laval Dynamites	3	(0)
2007–2008	Trois-Rivières Attak	30	(7)
2008	Montreal Impact	1	(0)
2009–2011	Trois-Rivières	29	(29)
2012–2015	FC L'Assomption-Lanaudière	65	(5)
Total		141	(52)

International career
2013	Québec	1	(0)
- * Club domestic league appearances and goals as of 12 November 2017

Jean-Louis Bessé (born July 5, 1980) is an Ivorian retired footballer who played as a forward. He played at the international level with the Quebec national soccer team.

== Club career ==
=== Early career ===
Bessé began his Canadian career in 2000 in the provincial circuit, the Ligue de Soccer Elite Quebec (LSEQ), with Francheville. In 2004, he began playing at the college level with the UQTR Patriotes. After the conclusion of the college season, he was invited to briefly train with the Toledo Slayers of the USL Premier Development League. In 2006, he was named the Male Athlete of the Year and was selected to the CIS all-star team.

He returned to the regional LSEQ in 2006 to play with Trois-Rivières Sélect, where he scored 11 goals, finishing as the third-highest goalscorer. During his stint in Trois-Rivières, he played a friendly match against the Montreal Impact. For the remainder of the season, he played in the interprovincial Canadian Soccer League with Laval Dynamites.

=== Trois-Rivières ===
The following CSL season, he signed with expansion franchise Trois-Rivières Attak. He made his debut on May 13 against Toronto Croatia in a scoreless draw. He scored his first goal on May 20, 2007, in a 2–1 win over the Canadian Lions. He helped Attak to claim their first piece of silverware by claiming the Open Canada Cup. He helped Trois-Rivières achieve an 18-game undefeated streak and clinched a postseason berth by finishing second in the National Division. Their playoff run ended on October 21, 2007, against the Serbian White Eagles in the semifinals.

He re-signed with Attak for the 2008 season. In his second term with Trois-Rivières, he assisted the club in securing its first National Division title and helped the club reach a 13-game undefeated streak. In the postseason, he contributed by scoring the opening goal in a 2–0 victory over the St. Catharines Wolves in the quarterfinal match. He featured in the CSL Championship final, where the Attak was defeated by the Serbian White Eagles, which ended in a 2–2 draw and was decided on penalties by a score of 2–1.

In 2009, the club began to change its philosophical approach and begin to transition into a developmental system for its parent club, the Montreal Impact. The result of these changes saw less recruitment of players from the Trois-Rivières region and more from Montreal.

=== Montreal Impact ===
In the same season, Besse was loaned out to the Montreal Impact in the USL First Division. He made his debut for Montreal on August 13, 2008, against Rochester Rhinos.

In 2009, he returned to play with Trois-Rivières Sélect. He finished the season as the top goal scorer in the LSEQ.

In 2012, he played in the newly formed Première Ligue de soccer du Québec (PLSQ) with FC L'Assomption-Lanaudière, where he recorded the first goal in the history of the PLSQ.

== International career ==
Bessé was selected for the Québec official soccer team to participate in the 2013 International Peoples, Cultures, and Tribes Tournament held in Marseille, France. He made his international debut for Québec on June 25, 2013, against Provence in the International Peoples, Cultures, and Tribes Tournament.

== Managerial career ==
In 2009, he was appointed the technical director for Les Dragons de Drummondville.

== Honours ==
Trois-Rivières Attak

- Open Canada Cup: 2007
- National Division Champions: 2008
