= Uwimana =

Uwimana is a surname. Notable people with the surname include:

- Aniella Uwimana (born 1999), Burundian footballer
- Davy Uwimana (born 1985), Burundian footballer
- Noe Uwimana (born 2005), Burundian footballer
