= David Fronimadis =

Canadian former soccer player (born 1982)

Personal information
- Full name: David Fronimadis
- Date of birth: October 13, 1982 (age 44)
- Place of birth: Montreal, Quebec, Canada
- Height: 5 ft 10 in (1.78 m)
- Position: Defender

Youth career
- 1998–2000: AS Jean-Talon Rosemont

Senior career*
Years	Team	Apps	(Gls)
2001	Montreal Dynamites	5	(0)
2002–2007	Montreal Impact	82	(2)
2007	→ Trois-Rivières Attak (loan)	1	(0)

International career^{‡}
2003	Canada U-20	3	(0)
2004	Canada	1	(0)
- * Club domestic league appearances and goals as of January 25, 2015 ‡ National team caps and goals as of 22 December 2009

David Fronimadis (born October 13, 1982) is a Canadian former soccer player who played in the Ligue de Soccer Elite Quebec, Canadian Professional Soccer League, and USL A-League/First Division.

== Club career ==
In his amateur years he played for AS Jean-Talon Rosemont of the Quebec Elite Soccer League where he won the Golden Ball and Golden Boot as the League MVP and leading scorer. He was named the 1999 Youth Player of the Year in the province of Quebec at the Quebec Soccer Federation's Gala de la Mi-Temps awards banquet. In 2001, he signed with the Montreal Dynamites in the Canadian Professional Soccer League.

=== Montreal Impact ===
In 2002, he made his USL First Division debut signing with the Montreal Impact. In 2003, he helped Montreal post the best defence in the league, with 21 goals allowed in 28 games, and scored his first two career goals with the Impact in 2003. Scored his first July 2 in Montreal against the Charlotte Eagles, his second August 9 against the Salty Dogs. He won Impact Unsung Hero Award, and was named 2003 Player of the Year in the province of Quebec.

In 2004, he suffered a serious knee injury in an exhibition game against Haiti on May 23, 2004 and missed the rest of the season, where the Impact would go on to win the League Championship, and the same year win the Voyageurs Cup. In 2005, he helped Montreal to a 15-game undefeated streak a new league record, as well win the regular-season title. But were not able to defend their League Championship.

In 2006, he helped the Impact post the best defense in the league for a fourth straight year, allowing only 15 goals in 28 games, a team record first set in 2004 and tied for the first time last year. Also helped the Impact collect 16 shutouts in 28 games, the second best total in club history tied with last year's, and three behind the league record of 19 set in 2004 by Montreal. They were able to defend their regular-season title, and the Voyageurs Cup, but were defeated in the playoffs by the Vancouver Whitecaps. During the 2007 season he was loaned to the Impact's farm team Trois-Rivières Attak of the Canadian Soccer League. He made his debut for the club on August 18, 2007 in a match against the Italia Shooters in a 0–0 tie.

== International career ==
He played his one and only game for the Canada national soccer team on 18 January 2004 against Barbados national football team in a friendly game.

== Honours ==
- 2001: QCSL World Cup Most Gentlemanly Player
