= Zoran Kokot =

Bosnian footballer (born 1985)

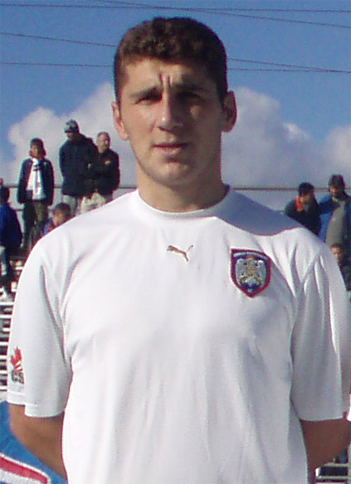
- Kokot in 2007

Personal information
- Full name: Zoran Kokot
- Date of birth: 28 June 1985 (age 41)
- Place of birth: Sarajevo, SR Bosnia and Herzegovina, SFR Yugoslavia
- Height: 1.81 m (5 ft 11 1/2 in)
- Position: Striker

Youth career
- 1993–2000: OFK Kasindo
- 2000–2004: Slavija Sarajevo

Senior career*
Years	Team	Apps	(Gls)
2004–2007	Slavija Sarajevo	44	(8)
2007	Hamilton Serbians		
2007	Serbian White Eagles		
2007–2009	Slavija Sarajevo	14	(9)
2009–2010	KSK Beveren	27	(2)
2010	Slavija Sarajevo	9	(2)
2010–2011	Mes Sarcheshme		
2012	Gol Gohar Sirjan		
2012–2013	Slavija Sarajevo	27	(6)
2013–2014	FK Olimpik	28	(3)
2014–2015	Slavija Sarajevo	14	(5)
2015	Željezničar Sarajevo	29	(6)
2015–2016	Mladost Podgorica	14	(2)
2016–2017	Vitez	28	(4)
2017–2018	Zvijezda Gradačac	10	(2)
2018	Travnik	8	(2)
2018–2019	Slavija Sarajevo	24	(12)
2020	Hamilton City	4	(1)
2021–2023	Famos Vojkovići	24	(2)

Managerial career
- 2023–: Famos Vojkovići (assistant)
- * Club domestic league appearances and goals

Zoran Kokot (Serbian Cyrillic: Зоран Кокот; born June 28, 1985) is a Bosnian retired footballer who played as a forward.

== Career ==
=== Early career ===
Kokot began his career in 2004 with Slavija in the Bosnian Premier League. In 2007, he played abroad in the Ontario Soccer League with the Hamilton Serbians, where he finished as the top goalscorer in the Provincial West Division.

Shortly after, he signed with the Serbian White Eagles in the Canadian Soccer League, where he assisted in securing the International Division title. In the opening round of the playoffs, the Serbs defeated the Windsor Border Stars, where Kokot contributed a goal. Kokot scored another goal in the semifinal round against Trois-Rivières Attak, which advanced the Serbs to the championship finals. In the championship final, the Serbs were defeated by Toronto Croatia in a two-game series.

=== Abroad ===
After a season abroad, he returned to FK Slavija and later played in the Belgian Second Division with KSK Beveren. In May 2011, he signed with Mes Sarcheshme in the Azadegan League. The following season, he played with Gol Gohar Sirjan F.C.

=== Bosnia ===
In 2012, he returned to FK Slavija and played with FK Olimpik. He played the first part of the 2014-15 season with Slavija. In February 2015, he signed a one-year contract with Željezničar Sarajevo. Throughout his tenure with Željezničar, he played in the 2015–16 UEFA Europa League against Balzan F.C., Ferencvárosi TC, and Standard Liège. He left Željezničar on mutual terms in December 2015. After that, he had another stint abroad, this time in the Montenegrin First League with Mladost Podgorica, where he assisted in securing the league title.

The following season he returned home to sign a one-year contract with Vitez. In 2017, he played in the First League of the Federation of Bosnia and Herzegovina with Zvijezda Gradačac. The remainder of the season, he played with Travnik. He returned to his former club Slavija the following season to play in the First League of the Republika Srpska, and retired in 2019.

=== Later career ===
In 2020, he came out of retirement to play once more in the Canadian Soccer League with Hamilton City. He debuted for Hamilton on August 15, 2020, against his former team, the Serbian White Eagles, and recorded a goal. Following his brief stint in Canada, he returned to Bosnia by playing in the Second League of the Republika Srpska with Famos Vojkovići in 2021. In his debut season with Famos, the club secured promotion to the second tier.

== International career ==
In December 2010, Bosnia national team coach Safet Sušić called him up for a friendly (the Bosnian team was comprised almost exclusively of domestic league players) against Poland.

== Managerial career ==
In the summer of 2023, he became the assistant coach for Famos Vojkovići under Darko Vojvodić.

== Honours ==
Serbian White Eagles

- Canadian Soccer League International Division: 2007
- CSL Championship runner–up: 2007

Mladost Podgorica

- Montenegrin First League: 2015–16
