= 2007 Voyageurs Cup =

2007 Coupe des Voyageurs (in French)

Tournament details
- Country: Canada
- Teams: 2

Final positions
- Champions: Montreal Impact (6th title)
- Runners-up: Vancouver Whitecaps FC

Tournament statistics
- Matches played: 2
- Goals scored: 2 (1 per match)
- Attendance: 17,248 (8,624 per match)
- Top goal scorer(s): Patrick Leduc; Matthew Palleschi (1 goal each)

The 2007 Voyageurs Cup was the sixth edition of the Voyageurs Cup tournament started by the Canadian supporters group The Voyageurs and the final edition that would take place under its format prior to the Cup's absorption into the new cup competition, the Canadian Championship, organized by the CSA the following season. For the 2007 edition of the tournament only two teams featured, the Montreal Impact and Vancouver Whitecaps. During the previous season, the Toronto Lynx had announced that they were voluntarily relegating themselves two levels, to the USL Premier Development League, likely due to their low attendance (the lowest in the USL 1st Division at that time) and the fact that Major League Soccer expansion franchise Toronto FC would be arriving to the city the next season.

The 2007 Voyageurs Cup was won by Montreal Impact who tallied a win and a draw across two match dates in the 2007 USL season. The cup was decided in a win by a 2–0 win by Montreal Impact the second and final meeting on August 18, 2007.

== Format ==
The 2007 USL First Division was not a balanced home and away competition where each team played the others an equal number of times; however, owing to a schedule which favoured regional taking priority to alleviate travel, the two sides only played each other twice (home and away). In each match, 3 points were awarded for wins, 1 point was awarded for a draw, and 0 points were awarded for losses. The two teams were ranked according to the total number of points obtained in all matches. The team with the most points would be crowned the champion, and awarded the Voyageurs Cup.

== Standings ==
Pos	Team	Pld	W	D	L	GF	GA	GD	Pts
1	Montreal Impact	2	1	1	0	2	0	+2	4
2	Vancouver Whitecaps FC	2	0	1	1	0	2	−2	1

== Schedule ==
June 1, 2007
20:00 ET

Montreal Impact	0–0	Vancouver Whitecaps FC
	Report

Complexe sportif Claude-Robillard, Montreal, QC
Attendance: 12,103
Referee: Domenic Scali

August 18, 2007
19:00 ET

Vancouver Whitecaps FC	0–2	Montreal Impact
	Report	Patrick Leduc 45'; Matthew Palleschi 90'

Swangard Stadium, Burnaby, BC
Attendance: 5,145
Referee: David Gantar

=== Champion ===
Voyageurs Cup:
Montreal Impact
6th Voyageurs Cup Win

== Top scorers ==
Rank	Player	Club	Goals
1	(Canada) Patrick Leduc	Montreal Impact	1
1	(Canada) Matthew Palleschi	Montreal Impact	1
