= Dan Anderson =

Dan Anderson may refer to:

- Dan Anderson (psychologist) (1921–2003), American psychologist
- Dan Anderson (basketball, born 1943), American ABA basketball player
- Dan Anderson (basketball, born 1951), American NBA basketball player
- Dan Anderson (voice actor) (born 1954), voice of Dad Asparagus in Christian series VeggieTales
- Dan Anderson (mathematician) (d. 2022), author of the Anderson conjecture

== See also ==
- Daniel Anderson (disambiguation)
- Dan Andersson (1888–1920), Swedish poet
