= Cédric Joqueviel =

French footballer (born 1982)

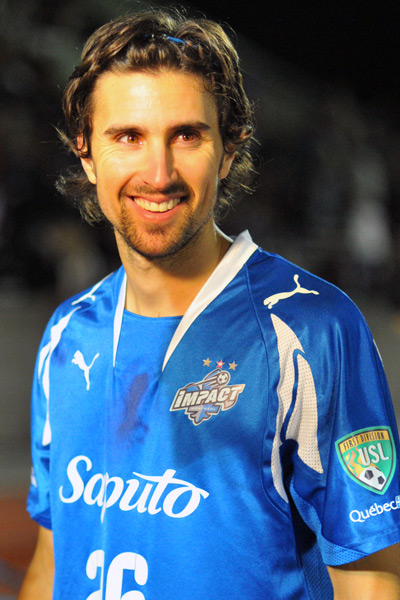

Personal information
- Date of birth: July 21, 1982 (age 44)
- Place of birth: Montpellier, France
- Height: 6 ft 1 in (1.85 m)
- Position: Centre-back

Youth career
- 1996–1999: Castelnau Le Crès

Senior career*
Years	Team	Apps	(Gls)
2000–2003	Montpellier		
2004–2006	Castelnau Le Crès		
2007–2010	Montreal Impact	38	(1)
2007	→ Trois-Rivières Attak (loan)	16	(0)
2011–2012	Castelnau Le Crès	0	(0)
2012–2016	La Grande Motte		
2016–2018	Le Grau du Roi		

International career
2013	Québec		
- * Club domestic league appearances and goals

Cédric Joqueviel (born July 21, 1982) is a French former professional footballer who played as a centre-back.

== Career ==
=== Early career in France ===
Joqueviel was a member of the youth academy at French Championnat de France amateur 2 side Castelnau Le Crès, and played for both Montpellier and the senior Castelnau Le Crès team, before coming to North America in 2006.

=== Canada ===
Joqueviel signed with Montreal Impact of the USL First Division in 2007, but was sent on loan to Montreal's farm team, Trois-Rivières Attak in the Canadian Soccer League for the season. He helped Attak win the 2007 Open Canada Cup, and was named the team's most valuable player for the 2007 season.

He graduated up to the senior Impact side in 2008, and played 19 first team games for the team in his debut season. On December 2, 2008 the Impact announced the re-signing of Joqueviel to a three-year contract. Midway through the 2010 season Joqueviel terminated his contract with Impact and returned to France "to family reasons"; he had played 38 games and scored one goal for the Impact, winning the Canada Cup, the Nutrilite Canadian Championship, a USL First Division title, and going deep into the CONCACAF Champions League.

== Personal ==
Joqueviel became a Canadian permanent resident in April 2010.

== Honors ==
=== Montreal Impact ===
- USL First Division Championship (1): 2009

== Career stats ==
Team	Season	League	Domestic League			Domestic Playoffs			Domestic Cup^{1}			Concacaf Competition^{2}			Total		
Team	Season	League	Apps	Goals	Assists	Apps	Goals	Assists	Apps	Goals	Assists	Apps	Goals	Assists	Apps	Goals	Assists
Trois-Rivières Attak	2007	CSL	16	0	0	2	0	0	-	-	-	-	-	-	18	0	0
Montreal Impact	2008	USL-1	19	0	0	2	0	0	2	0	0	7	0	0	30	0	0
Montreal Impact	2009	USL-1	15	1	1	6	0	0	1	0	0	-	-	-	22	1	1
Montreal Impact	2010	USSF D2	4	0	0	-	-	-	2	0	0	-	-	-	6	0	0
		Total CSL	16	0	0	2	0	0	-	-	-	-	-	-	18	0	0
		Total USSF D2	38	1	1	8	0	0	5	0	0	7	0	0	58	1	1
