= Elkana Mayard =

Canadian former soccer player (born 1982)

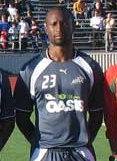
- Mayard in 2007

Personal information
- Full name: Elkana Mayard
- Date of birth: May 17, 1982 (age 44)
- Place of birth: Montreal, Quebec, Canada
- Height: 1.85 m (6 ft 1 in)
- Position: Defender

Youth career
- 2002–2003: Racing de Montréal-Nord
- 2003–2006: Fairleigh Dickinson Knights
- 2004–2006: SC Panellinios Montréal

Senior career*
| Years | Team | Apps | (Gls) |
| 2007–2009 | Trois-Rivières Attak | 50 | (4) |
| 2009 | → Montreal Impact (loan) | 5 | (0) |
| 2010 | Chelsea Laval | 10 | (0) |
| 2012 | FC St-Léonard | 14 | (0) |
- * Club domestic league appearances and goals

Elkana Mayard (born May 17, 1982) is a Canadian former soccer player who played as a defender.

== Career ==
Born in Montreal, Quebec, Mayard started his career in 2002 with Racing de Montréal-Nord, and SC Panellinios Montréal in the Ligue de Soccer Elite Quebec. In the LSEQ he was a finalist for the LSEQ Defender of the Year award for three seasons eventually winning the award in 2002.

He played college soccer with Fairleigh Dickinson University for three years. During his US college seasons, he was selected on the all-star team during the tournaments at Duke University in 2004, Wisconsin-Milwaukee in 2005, and Creighton University in 2006. Finally, he was also selected on the second all-star team in 2005 and on the first all-star team in 2006.

On March 18, 2007, the new expansion side Trois-Rivières Attak of the Canadian Soccer League announced the signing of Mayard. He made his debut on May 13, 2007, against Toronto Croatia. On May 18, 2007, he made history by scoring the franchise's first goal, but unfortunately the match finished in a 2–1 defeat to the Serbian White Eagles. Throughout the regular season he helped Attak to claim their first piece of silverware by winning the Open Canada Cup, and finished runners-up in the National Division. During the club's playoff run Mayard scored the second goal in a 3–0 victory over the Italia Shooters in the quarterfinals. Their season came to an end when the White Eagles eliminated the Attak by a score of 2–1 in the semifinals.

The following season he re-signed with the club. He helped the Attak claim the club's first National Division title, and reached the final of the CSL Championship, where once again the Attak were defeated by the White Eagles; after a 2–2 draw, the match was decided through a penalty shoot-out, which the White Eagles won by a score of 2–1. On March 11, 2009, the Attak announced the re-signing of Mayard for the 2009 season and was appointed the team captain.

On May 30, 2009, Mayard was loaned to Montreal Impact of the USL First Division, making his debut against the Rochester Rhinos. In January 2010 he left Trois-Rivières to join FC Chelsea Laval and FC St-Léonard in the Première Ligue de soccer du Québec.

== Personal life ==
Mayard is of Haitian descent, has two brothers who also play professional soccer; Josué Mayard who represents Haiti internationally, and Pierre-Rudolph Mayard.

== Honors ==
Trois-Rivières Attak

- Open Canada Cup: 2007
- National Division Champions: 2008
