= Reda Agourram =

Canadian soccer player

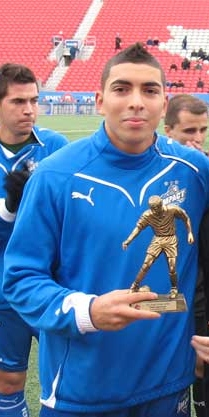

Personal information
- Full name: Reda Agourram
- Date of birth: October 12, 1990 (age 36)
- Place of birth: Rabat, Morocco
- Height: 6 ft 0 in (1.83 m)
- Position: Striker

Youth career
- 2003–2005: AS Pointe-aux-Trembles
- 2006–2007: Saint-Donat SC
- 2008: Montréal Concordia

Senior career*
Years	Team	Apps	(Gls)
2009	Trois-Rivières Attak	19	(13)
2009–2011	Montreal Impact	42	(7)
2014-2015	FAR Rabat	8	(0)

International career^{‡}
2009	Canada U-20	3	(2)
2011	Canada U-23	4	(3)
2013	Québec	3	(4)
2018	Canada futsal	1	(1)
- * Club domestic league appearances and goals as of August 15, 2011 ‡ National team caps and goals as of June 27, 2013

Reda Agourram (born October 12, 1990) is a former soccer player.

== Career ==
=== Professional ===
Agourram began playing soccer with Montreal-Concordia in 2008 in the Ligue de Soccer Elite Quebec. In 2009, he signed with Trois-Rivières Attak of the Canadian Soccer League. In his debut season he was the league's top scorer with 13 goals, and won the CSL Championship. He was also named the CSL Rookie of the Year.

On January 20, 2010, the Montreal Impact of the USSF Division 2 announced that Agourram had been invited to their pre-season training camp. After a successful tryout, the Impact signed him to a two-year contract on March 17, 2010. He made his debut for the team on April 11, 2010, in a 2–0 loss to the Austin Aztex.

After being without a club for a year, it was announced that Agourram was returning to his native Morocco to play for FAR Rabat of the Botola, the top division of the Moroccan football league system.

== International ==
Agourram played for the Canada U-20 team in the 2009 Jeux de la Francophonie. He managed to score in his second game in a 2–2 draw against Congo. He was also invited to the 2010 Canada U-23 camp. In 2013, Agourram was selected for the newly formed Québec national soccer team for its inaugural matches in the 2013 International Peoples, Cultures, and Tribes Tournament. He scored in a 3-1 group stage victory over Provence.

=== International goals ===
Scores and results list Québec's goal tally first.

#	Date	Venue	Opponent	Score	Result	Competition
1	25 June 2013	Stade Terrades, Marseille, France	Provence	2–1	3–1	2013 International Peoples, Cultures, and Tribes Tournament

== Career stats ==
Team	Season	League	Domestic League			Domestic Playoffs			Domestic Cup^{1}			Concacaf Competition^{2}			Total		
Team	Season	League	Apps	Goals	Assists	Apps	Goals	Assists	Apps	Goals	Assists	Apps	Goals	Assists	Apps	Goals	Assists
Trois-Rivières Attak	2009	CSL	19	13	-	-	-	-	-	-	-	-	-	-	19	13	0
Montreal Impact Academy	2010	CSL	2	3	-	-	-	-	-	-	-	-	-	-	2	3	0
Montreal Impact	2010	USSF D2	22	2	0	4	0	0	1	0	0	-	-	-	26	2	0
Montreal Impact	2011	NASL	7	0	0	-	-	-	-	-	-	-	-	-	7	0	0
		Total CSL	21	16	-	-	-	-	-	-	-	-	-	-	21	16	-
		Total NASL	29	2	0	4	0	0	1	0	0	-	-	-	34	2	0
