= Alex Surprenant =

Canadian soccer player (born 1989)

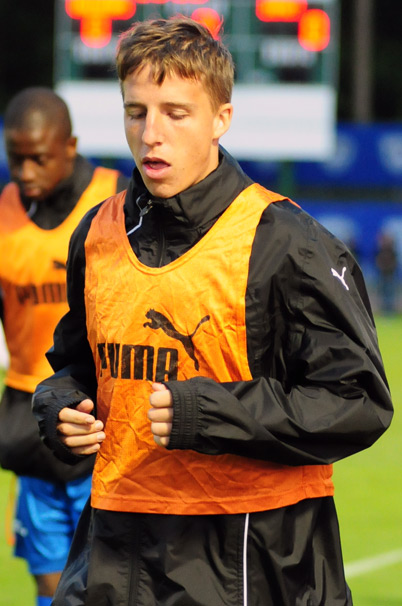
- Surprenant in 2009

Personal information
- Full name: Alex Surprenant
- Date of birth: September 4, 1989 (age 37)
- Place of birth: Saint-Alexandre, Quebec, Canada
- Height: 5 ft 10 in (1.78 m)
- Position: Defender

Youth career
- 2004–2005: Lakers du Lac Saint-Louis

Senior career*
Years	Team	Apps	(Gls)
2007	Trois-Rivières Attak	18	(2)
2008–2009	Montreal Impact	14	(1)
2011	FC Edmonton	19	(2)

International career
2008–2009	Canada U-20	9	(0)
2013	Québec		
- * Club domestic league appearances and goals as of January 21, 2012

Alex Surprenant (born September 4, 1989) is a Canadian soccer player currently unattached.

== Career ==
=== Youth ===
Born in Saint-Alexandre, Quebec, Surprenant began playing soccer with Lakers du Lac Saint-Louis in the Ligue de Soccer Elite Quebec, where he was named Best Defender, and won a gold medal at the Canadian Club Championships in 2006.

=== Professional ===
Surprenant was signed by new expansion franchise Trois-Rivières Attak for the 2007 CSL season. He helped Attak to claim their first piece of silverware by claiming the Open Canada Cup, and finished as runner-up in the National Division, before losing to the Serbian White Eagles in the CSL Championship Game.

Surprenant signed with the Montreal Impact of the USL First Division in 2008. He made his debut on May 14, 2008, against the Charleston Battery, and scored his first Impact goal on September 8, 2008, against Minnesota Thunder. Surprenant also helped the Impact claim the inaugural Canadian Championship, which gained Montreal entry into the qualifying round of the CONCACAF Champions League 2008-09. In the playoffs, he helped the Impact make the semi-finals, where they were eliminated by eventual winners, the Vancouver Whitecaps FC.

Surprenant signed with FC Edmonton of the North American Soccer League on March 3, 2011. The club released Surprenant on October 12, 2011.
