= Daniel Andersson =

Daniel Andersson may refer to:

- Daniel Andersson (footballer, born 1972), Swedish football goalkeeper
- Daniel Andersson (footballer, born 1977), Swedish football midfielder
- Daniel Andersson (politician) (born 1986), Swedish politician
- Daniel Andersson (speedway rider) (born 1974), Swedish speedway rider
- Dan Andersson (1888–1920), Swedish author and poet

== See also ==
- Daniel Anderson (disambiguation)
