= Carmen D'Onofrio =

Canadian soccer player (born 1974)

Personal information
- Full name: Carmen David D'Onofrio
- Date of birth: April 16, 1974 (age 52)
- Place of birth: Vancouver, Canada
- Position: Midfielder

Senior career*
Years	Team	Apps	(Gls)
1996–2001	Edmonton Drillers (indoor)	150	(127)
1997	Toronto Lynx	11	(0)
1999–2000	Vancouver 86ers	19	(1)
2005–2007	Columbus Clan F.C.		

International career
1991–1992	Canada U20	5	(1)
1994–1996	Canada U23	10	(0)

Managerial career
- 2007: Columbus Clan F.C. (player/coach)
- * Club domestic league appearances and goals

Carmen D'Onofrio (born April 16, 1974) is a Canadian former soccer player who played in the National Professional Soccer League, USL A-League, and the Vancouver Metro Soccer League.

== Playing career ==
D'Onofrio was drafted in 1991 by the Vancouver 86ers in the CSL draft, but decided to play college soccer with Stanford University. He began his career at the indoor level in 1996 with the Edmonton Drillers in the National Professional Soccer League. In his debut season he finished as the team's top goalscorer, and was named to the NPSL First Team All-Rookie. In 1997, he signed with the Toronto Lynx of the USL A-League, and featured in the postseason match against Montreal Impact. In 1999, he signed a contract with the Vancouver 86ers, and appeared in 19 matches with 1 goal. In 2005, he played with Columbus Clan F.C. in the Vancouver Metro Soccer League.

== International career ==
D'Onofrio made his debut for the Canada men's national under-20 soccer team on August 5, 1991 in the 1991 Pan American Games. He represented Canada in the 1992 CONCACAF U-20 Tournament. He also played with Canada men's national under-23 soccer team in the 1994 Jeux de la Francophonie.

== Managerial career ==
In 2007, he served as the player/head coach for Columbus where the team won the British Columbia Provincial Soccer Championship, and also reached the finals of the 2007 Open Canada Cup. The British Columbia Soccer Association named him the Coach of the Year in 2007.
