= Darko Kolić =

Serbian footballer

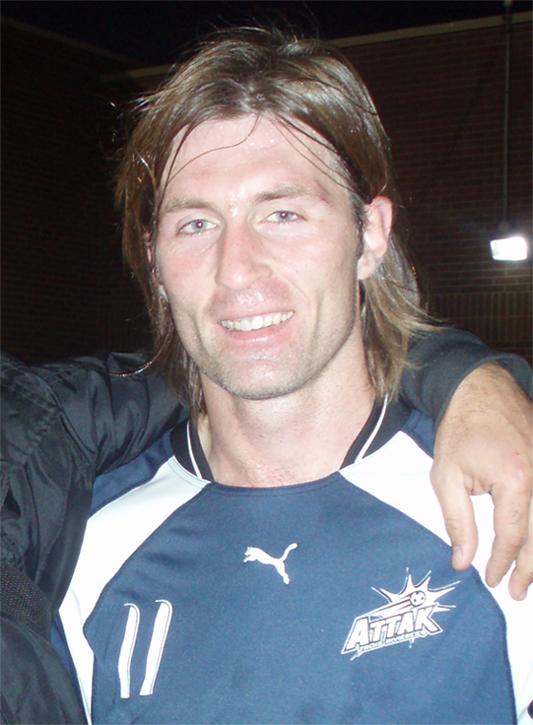
- Kolić with the Trois-Rivières Attak in 2007

Personal information
- Date of birth: October 6, 1971 (age 55)
- Place of birth: Belgrade, SFR Yugoslavia
- Height: 1.79 m (5 ft 10 in)
- Position: Striker

Senior career*
Years	Team	Apps	(Gls)
1992–1994	Rad Belgrade	0	(0)
1994–1996	Hajduk Belgrade		
1997	Montreal Impact	17	(5)
1998	Richmond Kickers	15	(3)
1999	Long Island Rough Riders	25	(19)
2000–2006	Montreal Impact	88	(12)
2007	Trois-Rivières Attak	19	(16)
2008	Vermont Voltage	18	(14)
- * Club domestic league appearances and goals as of 9 May 2015

Darko Kolić (Serbian Cyrillic: Дарко Колић; born October 6, 1971) is a Serbian former footballer.

== Playing career ==
Kolić began his professional career in his hometown of Belgrade (near the Fontana neighborhood where he grew up) in 1992 – first with FK Rad in the First Division and then Hajduk Belgrade in the Second Division.

He signed with the Montreal Impact in 1997 and played with the team until the end of the 2006 season, with stints in Richmond in 1998 and Long Island in 1999.

He tallied 17 goals and nine assists while playing for Long Island in 1999 and with that performance, he finished fourth in league scoring and earned a spot on the second all-star team. When he returned to the Impact in 2000, he finished first in team scoring with eight goals and four assists. With the Impact, he won the Montreal Cup, a six-team international tournament played at Complexe sportif Claude-Robillard in 2001, the league championship in 2004, as well as the regular-season title in 1997, 2005 and 2006.

In the 2007 season, he played for the Trois-Rivières (then the Impact farm team) in nineteen games, scoring sixteen goals. His contract was not renewed in December 2007 and he joined Vermont Voltage. For Vermont, Kolić appeared in eighteen games and notched fourteen goals.

== Coaching career ==
Kolić began his coaching career in 2007 when he was named assistant coach of the Concordia Stingers. In November, he left the Stingers and joined Vermont Voltage, becoming the assistant to Bo Simić.

In February 2011, Kolić was named technical director of FC Anjou located in the eastern part of the city of Montreal. He replaced another retired Impact player, Jason DiTullio, and was assisted by Impact players António Ribeiro, Reda Agourram and Hicham Aâboubou.

== Honours ==
- 1997: Commissioner's Cup
- 2001: Montreal Cup
- 2002: Voyageurs Cup
- 2003: Voyageurs Cup
- 2003: Can Am Cup
- 2004: USL First Division Championship
- 2004: Voyageurs Cup
- 2004: Can Am Cup
- 2005: Commissioner's Cup
- 2005: Voyageurs Cup
- 2006: Commissioner's Cup
- 2006: Voyageurs Cup
- 2008: PASL MVP

== Recreational ==
Kolić represented Canada at Quebec Calcetto Soccer League (QCSL) 2009 with sixteen games and thirty-four goals.
