= Josué Mayard =

Haitian footballer (born 1980)

Personal information
- Date of birth: October 3, 1980 (age 46)
- Place of birth: Montreal, Quebec, Canada
- Height: 1.80 m (5 ft 11 in)
- Position: Defender

Senior career*
Years	Team	Apps	(Gls)
2000	Montreal Impact	13	(4)
2001	Nashville Metros	1	(0)
2001–2002	Dallas Burn	6	(0)
2002	Kansas City Wizards	0	(0)
2003–2005	Toronto Lynx	55	(2)
2005	Vancouver Whitecaps	2	(0)
2006	Pors Grenland	26	(4)
2007–2008	Notodden FK	14	(0)

International career^{‡}
2000–2007	Haiti	17	(2)
- * Club domestic league appearances and goals as of 17 February 2008 ‡ National team caps and goals as of 17 February 2008

Josué Mayard (born October 3, 1980) is a former Haitian international soccer player who played as a defender. Throughout his playing career, he had stints in Europe, Major League Soccer, and the USL A-League.

== Club career ==
Mayard began his professional career in 2000 with the Montreal Impact of the USL A-League where he had an impressive rookie campaign, recording 4 goals and 2 assists in only 13 games. After having an impressive campaign with the Impact he signed for Dallas Burn of the Major League Soccer. He split the 2002 season between the Dallas Burn and Kansas City Wizards playing only three matches with Dallas. Mayard returned to the A-League to sign with the Toronto Lynx his signing was announced in a press conference on April 30, 2003. He made his debut for the club on May 3, 2003, against Pittsburgh Riverhounds.

He re-signed with Toronto for the 2004 season his signing was announced on April 7, 2004. Throughout the 2004 season the Lynx failed to acquire a playoff berth. Mayard returned for his third stint with the organization on April 19, 2005. On June 21, 2005, Mayard was traded to the Vancouver Whitecaps in exchange for Said Ali. With the Caps he helped the team make the playoffs reaching the semi-finals but losing to Richmond Kickers in a penalty shootout.

In 2006, he went abroad to Norway and signed with Pors Grenland in the Norwegian First Division playing 26 games and scoring 4 goals. In 2007, he moved to league rivals Notodden FK, and appeared in 14 matches.

== International career ==
Although he is a Canadian citizen, due to his Haitian heritage he was able to compete for the Haiti national football team in their quest to qualify for the 2002 World Cup, making his debut for Haiti against Honduras. He also helped the team qualify for the 2007 CONCACAF Gold Cup. He did not however make their Gold Cup squad.

== Personal life ==
Mayard has two brothers who also play professional soccer; Pierre-Rudolph and Elkana Mayard.
