= Quebéc official soccer team =

Soccer team representing Quebec

Québec
- Nickname: Les Québécois
- Association: Quebec Soccer Federation
- Head coach: Patrick Leduc
- Top scorer: Pascal Aoun; Cedric Carrie (2)
First colours

First international
- Quebec 21–0 Tibet (Marseille, France; 24 June 2013)

Last international
- Quebec 2–1 UGA Ardziv (Armenia) (Marseille, France; 28 June 2013)

Biggest win
- Quebec 21–0 Tibet (Marseille, France; 24 June 2013)

Biggest defeat
- Quebec 0–1 Kurdistan Region (Marseille, France; 27 June 2013)

The Québec official soccer team (French: équipe de soccer officielle du Québec) is the official soccer team representing the Canadian province of Québec. The stated mission of the team is "...to allow Québec to be represented at the international level to share our language, our culture and heritage through soccer." Originally, the team was not sanctioned by the Quebec Soccer Federation as the federation was suspended by the Canadian Soccer Association in June 2013 for not allowing players wearing turbans for religious reasons to participate in matches. However, the team communicated with the federation and regularly communicated the progress of the project to build a relationship in preparation for being sanctioned in the future. In May 2014, it was announced that the team had officially become associated with the QSF and were working together to perhaps eventually become a member of CONCACAF and play against other national teams. Québec is not a member of FIFA or any confederation or subconfederation as they are wholly a part of Canada. However, Québec is an official member of the Confederation of Independent Football Associations (ConIFA), a global umbrella organization for national football teams outside FIFA. Usually in Québec, the majority of the population speak French, while English is the largest minority. Although the purpose of the team is said to be cultural, not political, the team is partially funded by the Saint-Jean-Baptiste Society and Parti Québécois, a Canadian political party that advocates the Québec sovereignty movement. The team was formed in 2013 and played its first match against a Tibet select team in the 2013 International Peoples, Cultures, and Tribes Tournament, an event hosted by Marseille as the 2013 European Capital of Culture, on 24 June 2013. Québec won the match 21–0. The team currently consists mostly of players from the Première Ligue de soccer du Québec and former Montreal Impact players. They are currently coached by former Canadian international Patrick Leduc.

== History ==

Québec's starting XI in their first match

The idea of a Québec national soccer team started as a hypothetical conversation at a birthday party attended by both Patrick Leduc and Yannick Saint-Germain, a former member of the Montreal Impact marketing department and Montreal Director of Operations for the 2007 FIFA U20 World Cup held in Canada. An initial attempt by Saint-Germain to form a national team for Québec in hopes of entering the 2012 VIVA World Cup for non-FIFA teams failed. However, in 2013 a team was organized to enter the 2013 International Peoples, Cultures, and Tribes Tournament held in Marseille, France. For the tournament, the team had a budget of only $40,000 CAD and stayed in college dormitories and took public transportation. This tournament was the first time that a senior team representing Québec had played in an international tournament. However, Under-14 and Under-16 teams have competed against France and Mexico in the past. After several teams dropped out of the 2013 International Peoples, Cultures, and Tribes Tournament because they were unable to obtain visas, the groups were reorganized and Québec was grouped with hosts Provence and a select side of European-based Tibetan players representing Tibet. Québec played their first-ever match on 24 June 2013 against Tibet and won 21–0. Durnik Jean and Reda Agourram led Québec's offense in the match with four and three goals respectively. However, because it was not the official Tibet national football team, it was not considered a full international match. Coincidentally, this first match, and victory, occurred on St. John the Baptist Day, the National Holiday of Québec. On 25 June 2013, Québec played its first official full international against Provence as part of the same tournament and was entered into the non-FIFA rankings. Québec upset the hosts by scoring three unanswered goals after trailing 0–1. Despite the loss, both Québec and Provence qualified for the next round of the tournament. At the time of the match, Provence was ranked 21 of 68 Non-FIFA teams. In the semi-final match, Québec was finally defeated 0–1 by the B-squad of Kurdistan in extra time. Therefore, Québec faced off against the team of UGA Ardziv (French local club, playing 8th tier), losers of the other semi-final against Provence, for the bronze medal of the tournament. On 28 June 2013, Québec defeated the squad of UGA Ardziv by a score of 2–1 after going down a goal early. Therefore, Québec earned a medal in its inaugural international tournament.

On 9 October 2013, Québec became an official member of the Confederation of Independent Football Associations (ConIFA), a global umbrella organization for national football teams outside FIFA. Other members of the federation include Occitania, Tamil Eelam, and Northern Cyprus. On 23 October 2013, it was announced that Québec would take part in the 2014 ConIFA World Championship to be held from 31 May to 8 July 2014 in Sweden. However, it was announced in May 2014 that Québec withdrew from the ConIFA World Championship after associating with the Québec Soccer Federation. The team and association decided to take part in only "federated" soccer in hopes of one day being recognized as a CONCACAF member.

In June 2015, a Québec squad was assembled for the first time in two years for a match against semi-professional side Vermont Voltage. The match was also the team's first match in Québec, taking place in Saint-Lambert as part of its soccer association's 30th anniversary. Patrick Leduc remained a player-coach for the squad. The match was dubbed the Lake Champlain Derby because of the close proximity both teams had to the lake. Two days before the match was set to be played, it was cancelled, once again, because of the QSF prohibiting the team from playing non-federated matches.

A youth Quebec side has participated in two editions (2013 and 2017) of the Jeux de la Francophonie football tournament, with these events representing the highest-profile competitions a Quebec team has taken part in.

== Kit ==
Since 2013, the Italian sportswear company Mass Sport has been the kit provider for Québec. In 2014 they changed their supplier to the local brand Savi. The kit is blue and white with a Fleur-de-lis on the chest, representing the traditional colours and design of the flag of Québec.

== List of international matches ==
=== 2013 ===
24 June 2013 2013 International Peoples, Cultures, and Tribes Tournament	Quebec	21–0	Tibet	Marseille, France
10:30 UTC+01:00		Report		Stadium: Stade Montredon Michelier

25 June 2013 2013 International Peoples, Cultures, and Tribes Tournament (A)	Quebec	3–1	Provence	Marseille, France
15:00 UTC+01:00	Arshadi 28' 48'; Carrie 80'	Report	De Santi 4'	Stadium: Stade Terrades

27 June 2013 2013 International Peoples, Cultures, and Tribes Tournament – Semi-final	Quebec	0–1	Kurdistan Region	Marseille, France
15:00 UTC+01:00				Stadium: Stade Roger-Lebert

28 June 2013 2013 International Peoples, Cultures, and Tribes Tournament – Third Place Match	Quebec	2–1	UGA Ardziv	Marseille, France
14:00 UTC+01:00	Carrie; Aoun

=== 2015 ===
19 June 2015 Friendly	Quebec	Cancelled	(United States) Vermont Voltage	Saint-Lambert, Quebec
20:00 EST		[Report]		Stadium: Seaway Park

(A) = full Non-FIFA "A" International Match

== Current squad ==
This squad was selected for the 2013 International Peoples, Cultures, and Tribes Tournament.

No.	Pos.	Player	Date of birth (age)	Caps	Goals	Club
1	GK	Vincent Cournoyer	28 September 1987 (age 39)		0	(Canadian Soccer Association) Montreal Impact
16	GK	Dominic Provost	4 June 1993 (age 33)		0	(Canadian Soccer Association) Montreal Impact
3	DF	Cédric Joqueviel	21 July 1982 (age 44)			(French Football Federation) Castelnau Le Crès
14	DF	Fabrice Lassonde	18 February 1989 (age 37)			(Canadian Soccer Association) FC Edmonton
2	DF	Patrick Leduc	26 December 1977 (age 48)			unattached
6	DF	Stephen Meterissian	28 November 1995 (age 30)			(Canadian Soccer Association) Concordia University
5	DF	Alex Surprenant	4 September 1989 (age 37)			unattached
4	MF	Olivier Babineau	28 November 1995 (age 30)			unattached
13	MF	Cedric Carrie	6		1	unattached
15	MF	Kevin Cossette	9 January 1990 (age 36)			(Canadian Soccer Association) Montreal Impact
17	MF	Tommy Lucas				unattached
7	MF	Kévin Chan	11 July 1990 (age 36)			(Chinese Taipei Football Association) Kaohsiung County Taipower
8	FW	Reda Agourram	10 December 1990 (age 35)	1	1	(Royal Moroccan Football Federation) FAR Rabat
9	FW	Pascal Aoun			1	unattached
18	FW	Jean-Louis Bessé	5 July 1980 (age 46)			(Canadian Soccer Association) FC L'Assomption
10	FW	Durnick Jean				unattached
11	FW	Nicolas Lesage	3 January 1980 (age 46)			unattached
12	FW	Gabriel Moreau				unattached

== Managers ==
Manager	Note	Year(s)
(Canada) Patrick Leduc		2013–
