= Pierre-Rudolph Mayard =

Canadian soccer player

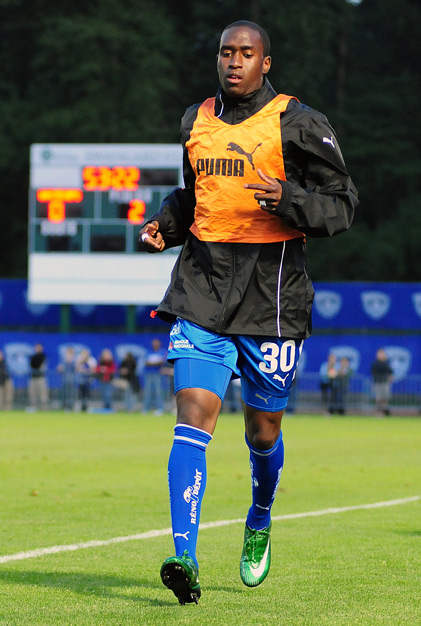
- Mayard warming up for Montreal Impact in 2009

Personal information
- Date of birth: February 21, 1988 (age 38)
- Place of birth: Laval, Quebec, Canada
- Height: 1.85 m (6 ft 1 in)
- Positions: Winger; striker

Team information
- Current team: Blainville
- Number: 80

Youth career
- 2003–2004: FC Sélect Rive-Sud
- 2005: CSR Montréal-Concordia
- 2006: SC Panellinios Montréal

Senior career*
Years	Team	Apps	(Gls)
2007–2008	Trois-Rivieres Attak	16	(8)
2009–2011	Montreal Impact	20	(1)
2010	→ Charleston Battery (loan)	16	(5)
2013	Vaasan Palloseura	0	(0)
2013	FC St-Léonard	11	(9)
2013	Rochester Rhinos	7	(0)
2014	Ottawa Fury	18	(1)
2015	FC L'Assomption-Lanaudière	13	(15)
2016–2025	AS Blainville	113	(79)

International career^{‡}
2005	Canada U15	4	(0)
2006–2007	Canada U17	12	(2)
2005–2006	Canada U18	8	(0)
2007	Canada U20	7	(0)
- * Club domestic league appearances and goals as of September 8, 2025 ‡ National team caps and goals as of May 13, 2009

Pierre-Rudolph Mayard (born February 21, 1988), commonly known as Papouche, is a Canadian former soccer player who played as a forward .

== Club career ==
=== Early career ===
Mayard began his career in 2003, playing with Canadian junior team FC Sélect Rive-Sud. In 2005, he played for the CSR Montréal-Concordia U18 team, winning the silver medal at the Saputo AAA Quebec Cup. In 2006, he joined SC Panellinios Montréal in the Ligue de Soccer Elite Quebec.

In 2003 Mayard also began playing with the Quebec junior select team, with whom he won the 2004 Canadian championships. In 2004, he was also named the youth player of the year in Quebec. He finished third at the Canada games and first at the Adidas cup with the U18 Quebec select team.

=== Trois-Rivieres Attak ===
In 2007, he signed with Trois-Rivieres Attak of the Canadian Soccer League. In his debut season he failed to make an appearance due to an injury sustained in a preseason match. He re-signed with the Attak for the 2008 season. He recorded his first goal for the club on June 21, 2008, against TFC Academy. During the regular season he helped the team clinch the National Division title. In the postseason he contributed two goals in a 7–0 victory over Portugal FC. He featured in the CSL Championship final against Serbian White Eagles, where the Attak were defeated in a penalty shootout.

=== Montreal Impact ===
The following season on February 27, 2009, he was signed by the Montreal Impact of the USL First Division. During the season he returned to Trois-Rivieres on a loan to win the CSL Championship after defeating Serbia White Eagles in a 3–2 victory in a penalty shootout. Mayard was loaned to the Charleston Battery of the USL Second Division for five months, and returned to the Montreal on August 13, 2010. On March 17, 2010, Mayard's contract was extended until 2011 by the Montreal Impact. He was released by Montreal on October 12, 2011.

=== Vaasan Palloseura ===
In 2013, he briefly trialed with Finnish club Vaasan Palloseura, playing two matches including a 2013 Finnish League Cup match against KuPS and scoring in a match against SJK, but the club ultimately did not give him a contract for the season.

=== Rochester Rhinos ===
In 2013, he signed with the Rochester Rhinos of the USL PRO, where he appeared in 7 matches

=== Ottawa Fury ===
The following year he played with Ottawa Fury in the North American Soccer League.

=== PLSQ/L1Q ===
Following his stint in the NASL he played in the Première Ligue de soccer du Québec with FC L'Assomption-Lanaudière where he scored 13 goals in 15 matches.

In 2016, he played with AS Blainville, where he won the Ballon D’Or. At the end of the 2025 season, he announced he would depart Blainville, having becoming the all-time leading scorer for the club and the league.

== International career ==
Mayard was a member of the U17 national team in 2004 and 2005, and played for the Canadian U-20 team at the 2005 Jeux de la Francophonie, the 2006 Chivas Cup and the 2006 Porto tournament.

== Personal life ==
Mayard is of Haitian descent, has two other brothers who also play professional soccer; Josué Mayard who represents Haiti internationally, and Elkana Mayard.
