= Davy Uwimana =

Burundian footballer

Personal information
- Date of birth: 8 May 1985 (age 41)
- Place of birth: Bujumbura, Burundi
- Height: 1.68 m (5 ft 6 in)
- Position: Defender

Youth career
- 1997–1999: Olympique FC
- 2000–2001: FC Élite
- 2002: Corfinium St-Léonard
- 2003: Bourassa
- 2004: Corfinium St-Léonard
- 2005–2006: FC Sélect Rive-Sud
- 2007: FC Haiti

Senior career*
Years	Team	Apps	(Gls)
2007–2009	Trois-Rivières Attak	11	(1)
2008	Montreal Impact (loan)	12	(0)

International career
2001	Burundi U20		
- * Club domestic league appearances and goals as of 08:18, 25 August 2009 (UTC)

Davy Uwimana (born 8 May 1985) is a Burundian former professional soccer player who last played for the Trois-Rivières Attak. He was born in Bujumbura, Burundi.

== Career ==
He began his career by FC Sélect Rive-Sud and joined than in 2007 to Trois-Rivières Attak. In 2008 was promoted to Montreal Impact, in January 2009 turned back to Trois-Rivières, who was later released.
