= Tiarnan King =

Canadian soccer forward (born 1976)

Personal information
- Date of birth: 27 August 1976 (age 50)
- Place of birth: New Westminster, British Columbia, Canada
- Height: 5 ft 8 in (1.73 m)
- Position: Forward

Youth career
- –1999: Simon Fraser Clan

Senior career*
Years	Team	Apps	(Gls)
1999	Vancouver Explorers		
1999–2000	Burnaby Canadians		
2000	Abbostford 86ers		
2000–2003	Vancouver 86ers / Whitecaps	83	(4)
2000–2001	Edmonton Drillers (indoor)		
2001–2002	Bray Wanderers	0	(0)

International career
2004	Canada Futsal	5	(1)
- * Club domestic league appearances and goals

Tiarnan King is a Canadian soccer forward who played professionally in the USL First Division, National Professional Soccer League and Ireland. He earned five caps with the Canadian National Futsal Team in 2004.

== Club ==
King attended Simon Fraser University, playing on the men's soccer team. In 1999, he played for the Vancouver Explorers in the Pacific Coast Soccer League. That fall, he moved to Burbaby Canadians of the Vancouver Metro League. In February 2000, the Vancouver 86ers selected King in the A-League Draft. he began the 2000 season with Vancouver's reserve team, the Abbotsford 86ers, but joined the first team on June 15, 2000. King would play each summer, outdoor season with Vancouver (renamed the Whitecaps in 2001) until 2003. In the fall of 2000, King went indoors with the Edmonton Drillers of the National Professional Soccer League. When the Drillers folded in December 2000, King was not selected in the dispersal draft. He also spent six months with Bray Wanderers in Ireland, but played only for the team's reserve squad.

== International ==
In 2004, King earned five caps with the Canadian National Futsal Team. All came in the CONCACAF Futsal championship.
