= Danny Anderson =

Canadian soccer player (born 1979)

Personal information
- Full name: Daniel Anderson
- Date of birth: 16 May 1979 (age 47)
- Place of birth: Canada
- Height: 1.83 m (6 ft 0 in)
- Position: Midfielder
- 1998–2000: Montreal Impact
- 2000–2003: Robert Morris University

Senior career*
Years	Team	Apps	(Gls)
1997–1998	Plymouth Argyle F.C. reserve team		
2003–2004	Sunnana SK		
2004–2005	Dagenham & Redbridge F.C. reserve team		
2007	Trois-Rivières Attak	15	(2)

International career
1997–2001	Canada U-22	6	

Managerial career
- 1999–: The West Island Soccer School (Owner)
- 2008–2017: Hudson-St. Lazare Soccer Club (Technical Director)
- * Club domestic league appearances and goals

Daniel Anderson (born 16 May 1979) is a Canadian former soccer player who works as a coach at the West Island Soccer School.

== Career ==
Anderson has played for Dagenham & Redbridge in England in 2004 and 2005. In 2004, he also played for Sunnana SK, a team in the third Swedish division. He trained over the years with Nottingham Forest, Crystal Palace, Watford, and Plymouth Agyle. He was also selected to be part of the Canadian national U-22 team which won the gold medal in the "Jeux de la Francophonie" in 1997.

== Coaching career ==
Since 1999 he has owned The West Island Soccer School, and was the technical director of the St. Lazare- Hudson Hawks as well as FC Trois Lacs.
