= Marc Dos Santos =

Canadian soccer coach (born 1977)

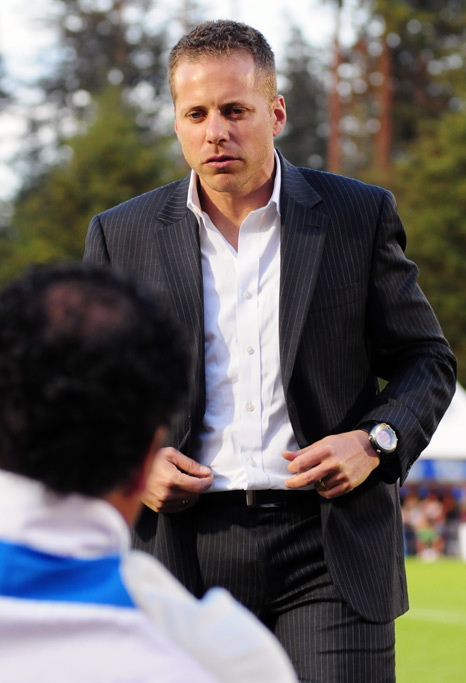
- Dos Santos in 2009

Personal information
- Full name: Marc Dos Santos
- Date of birth: May 26, 1977 (age 49)
- Place of birth: Montreal, Quebec, Canada
- Height: 6 ft 0 in (1.83 m)

Youth career
- Years: Team
- Beira-Mar

Managerial career
- 2007–2008: Trois-Rivières Attak
- 2009–2011: Montreal Impact
- 2014–2015: Ottawa Fury
- 2016: Sporting Kansas City II
- 2017: San Francisco Deltas
- 2018–2021: Vancouver Whitecaps FC
- 2026: Los Angeles FC

Marc Dos Santos (born May 26, 1977) is a Canadian soccer coach who was most recently the head coach for Los Angeles FC in Major League Soccer.

He was previously the head coach of Montreal Impact in D2 Pro League and the Vancouver Whitecaps FC, was North American Soccer League Coach of the Year in 2015, when he led the Ottawa Fury to the North American Soccer League Championship Final after a first-place finish in the Fall Season, coached at Swope Park Rangers of United Soccer League, San Francisco Deltas of NASL and assistant coach of Los Angeles FC. Prior to that, he focused on youth initiatives in Brazil with Primeira Camisa (U-20's) and Palmeiras (U-15's), culminating with a Copa do Brasil Sub-15 championship and a technical director position with Desportivo Brasil.

== Coaching career ==
=== Trois-Rivières Attak ===
In 2006, he coached the Lac St. Louis Lakers in the Ligue de Soccer Elite Quebec. On January 17, 2007, the Montreal native was first hired by the Montreal Impact in January 2007 to lead the club's reserve team, Trois-Rivières Attak, in the Canadian Soccer League. Under the guidance of Dos Santos, the club won the Open Canada Cup with a 3–0 victory in the final against the Columbus Clan FC. In the league, they finished second in the National Division and reached the playoff semi-final, where they eventually lost against the Serbian White Eagles.

During the 2008 CSL season Dos Santos led the Attak to claim the National Division title, the first Division title to be won by the club. For the second year in a row the Attak gained a playoff berth, eventually reaching the finals of the CSL Cup, where once again the Attak were defeated by White Eagles (this time on penalty kicks). On November 5, 2008, Dos Santos stepped down as head coach of Trois-Rivières.

=== Montreal Impact ===
In June 2008, Dos Santos became an assistant coach with the Montreal Impact first team under head coach John Limniatis. That year, the Impact won the inaugural Canadian Championship to claim a berth in the 2008–09 CONCACAF Champions League. In May 2009, Limniatis was fired and Dos Santos named as interim head coach. Later that year, Dos Santos was named head coach and remained in that position until his resignation on June 28, 2011. While head coach, Montreal won the USL First Division title in 2009.

=== Brazil ===
Dos Santos worked at three Brazilian clubs. On December 21, 2011, he was announced as the head coach of Primeira Camisa, which was then owned by World Cup champion Roque Júnior. During his tenure, he achieved the best result in the club's history at the Copa São Paulo de Futebol Júnior. In February 2012, Marc was hired by Palmeiras, one of Brazil's largest soccer teams, as its Youth Academy Coordinator. A Brazilian journalist ridiculed the Dos Santos hire by announcing it together with the photo of a donkey and the phrase "he is from Canada, a real soccer powerhouse". Marc became the head coach of Palmeiras U-15 and won the youth championship in 2012, a competition that the club had never won before. Over six thousand Palmeiras fans watched the final at the stadium. Marc moved to Desportivo Brasil, where he held the posts of technical director and head coach for roughly one year before returning to North America in 2013.

=== Ottawa Fury ===
Ottawa Fury announced the signing of Dos Santos as the first ever coach of the new NASL franchise on May 23, 2013. On September 15, 2015, Ottawa Fury announced that coach Marc Dos Santos would be leaving the club at the end of 2015 season to join MLS. At the time Ottawa Fury was placed first in fall standings and third in overall standings for 2015 season. On November 11, 2015, Dos Santos was named Coach of the Year for 2015 by the NASL.

=== Swope Park Rangers ===
Dos Santos was introduced as the first head coach to helm Swope Park Rangers, beginning in the 2016 season. He led the team to a fourth-place finish in the West and to the USL Cup final.

=== San Francisco Deltas ===
On August 17, 2016, Dos Santos was named as the first head coach of the San Francisco Deltas, beginning in the 2017 season. He led the Deltas to a 14–12–6 record—second-place in the table—and then to a 2–0 win over the New York Cosmos in the NASL Soccer Bowl to claim the league title. On November 17, 2017, Dos Santos resigned, shortly before the club ceased operations.

=== Vancouver Whitecaps FC ===
Dos Santos was named as head coach of MLS's Vancouver Whitecaps FC after the team finished its 2018 season. The club fired Dos Santos on August 27, 2021, after a 4–3 loss in the first round of the 2021 Canadian Championship to Canadian Premier League's Pacific FC; and after starting the MLS season with only five wins, seven draws and eight losses.

=== Los Angeles FC ===
Dos Santos joined Los Angeles FC as an assistant coach under Steve Cherundolo ahead of the 2022 season. On December 5, 2025, Dos Santos was announced as head coach by the club after Cherundolo stepped down at the end of the 2025 season.

On September 27, 2026, LAFC announced that it had parted ways with Dos Santos after a 1–0 loss to FC Dallas.

== Personal life ==
A dual citizen of Canada and Portugal, Dos Santos holds a UEFA A coaching licence and has worked at both Chelsea and Porto. He is fluent in four languages. He is married to his wife Marie with whom he has three children. Marc is the older brother of soccer coach Phillip Dos Santos.

== Coaching statistics ==
As of September 26, 2026

Team	From	To	Record				
Team	From	To	G	W	D	L	Win %
Trois-Rivières Attak	January 17, 2007	November 5, 2008	53	31	14	8	58.49
Montreal Impact	May 14, 2009	June 28, 2011	102	42	30	30	41.18
Ottawa Fury	May 23, 2013	November 17, 2015	63	23	18	22	36.51
Swope Park Rangers	November 20, 2015	November 21, 2016	34	17	6	11	50.00
San Francisco Deltas	November 21, 2016	November 24, 2017	37	18	12	7	48.65
Vancouver Whitecaps FC	November 7, 2018	August 27, 2021	81	22	20	39	27.16
Los Angeles FC	December 5, 2025	September 27, 2026	38	17	12	9	44.74
Total			408	170	112	126	41.67

=== Honours ===
- 2007 Head coach – Open Canada Cup Champions
- 2008 Head coach – Canadian Soccer League Division Champions
- 2008 Head coach – Canadian Soccer League Regular Season Champions
- 2008 Head coach – Nomination for Coach of the Year
- 2008 Assistant coach – Canadian Championship winner
- 2008 Assistant coach – Quarter Finals of the CONCACAF Champions League
- 2009 Head coach – USL Championship winner
- 2009 Head coach – Nomination for Coach of the Year
- 2010 Head coach – Semi–final of the USSF D2
- 2012 Head coach – Brazilian Youth Champions U–15
- 2015 Head coach – 2015 NASL Coach of the Year
- 2015 Head coach – NASL Fall Season Champions
- 2015 Head coach – NASL Soccer Bowl runner–up
- 2015 Head coach – League record: 648 consecutive minutes without conceding a goal. NASL League
- 2015 Head coach – League record: 14 matches without conceding a goal NASL
- 2015 Head coach – League record: 12 matches without losing away from home
- 2016 Head coach – USL Western Conference Champions
- 2016 Head coach – USL Championship runner–up
- 2017 Head coach – 2017 NASL Coach of the Year
- 2017 Head coach – 2017 NASL Soccer Bowl Championship Winner
