= Hicham Aâboubou =

Moroccan footballer (born 1978)

Personal information
- Full name: Hicham Aâboubou
- Date of birth: 19 May 1978 (age 48)
- Place of birth: Khenifra, Morocco
- Height: 1.83 m (6 ft 0 in)
- Position: Centre-back

Youth career
- 1992–1994: Khenifra

College career
Years	Team	Apps	(Gls)
2008–2009	Montréal Carabins		

Senior career*
Years	Team	Apps	(Gls)
1994–2001	Kawkab Marrakech		
2001–2002	Mouloudia Oujda		
2002–2006	Kawkab Marrakech	48	(2)
2006	Laval Dynamites	13	(2)
2006–2007	Montreal Impact	11	(0)
2007	→ Trois-Rivières Attak (loan)	3	(0)
2009–2011	Montreal Impact	34	(0)
2019	FC Lanaudière	7	(0)
- * Club domestic league appearances and goals as of 25 January 2015

Hicham Aâboubou (Arabic: هشام عبوبو; born 19 May 1978) is a Moroccan former professional footballer who played as a centre-back.

== Career ==
=== Africa ===
Aâboubou started his soccer career with Khenifra playing with the junior team from 1992 to 1994. In 1994, he joined Kawkab Marrakech, initially playing with the junior team before eventually graduating through the senior A team, where he would play until 2001. From 2001 to 2002, he played for Mouloudia Oujda before being transferred back to Kawkab Marrakech. From 2002 to 2006, he played with KACM A Team, scoring two goals in 48 games.

=== North America ===
In 2006, Aâboubou joined Canadian team Laval Dynamites and scored two goals in 13 games in his debut season with the club. On July 31, he joined Montreal Impact but did not play a single game in his first year. He made his debut for the team on April 21, 2007, against the Atlanta Silverbacks, but was released by Montreal in February 2008. During the 2007 season he was loaned to the Impact's farm team Trois-Rivières Attak of the Canadian Soccer League. He managed to win some silverware with the Attak by winning the Open Canada Cup, where he featured in the finals match against Columbus Clan F.C. which resulted in a 3–0 victory.

In the summer of 2008, Aâboubou announced he would take a sabbatical from professional soccer, intending to return to study at Arts of Science at Université de Montréal while playing college soccer for the university's Montréal Carabins.

On July 28, 2009, the Montreal Impact signed Aâboubou to a two-year contract. He made his first appearance of the season on August 1 against Miami FC. During the 2009 season Aâboubou helped the Impact clinch a playoff spot by finishing fifth in the standings. In the playoffs, he helped the Impact reach the USL finals against the Vancouver Whitecaps FC, the match was noted for the first time in USL history where the final match would consist of two Canadian clubs. The Impact would eventually defeat the Whitecaps on 6-3 aggregate on goals, and therefore claim their third USL Championship.

== Honors ==
Trois-Rivières Attak

- Open Canada Cup: 2007
