= 2007 Canadian Soccer League season =

Canadian Soccer League
- Season: 2007
- Champions: Toronto Croatia
- Regular Season title: Serbian White Eagles (International Division); St. Catharines Wolves (National Division)
- Matches: 110
- Goals: 376 (3.42 per match)
- Top goalscorer: Nicolas Lesage (Trois-Rivieres Attak)
- Best goalkeeper: Claudio Perri
- Biggest home win: 8–1 Canadian Lions v London City; 8–1 Italia Shooters v London City; 8–0 Toronto Croatia v London City
- Biggest away win: 1–6 London City v Italia Shooters

The 2007 Canadian Soccer League season was the tenth since its establishment. The first match of the season was played on May 11, 2007, and ended on October 28, 2007. The season concluded with Toronto Croatia claiming their third championship by defeating rivals Serbian White Eagles 4-1 on aggregate making Croatia one of the most successful clubs in the history of the CSL & Canadian soccer. Toronto Croatia also celebrated its 50-year anniversary in Canadian soccer by winning the CSL title after losing just one game in the 5-month long campaign, including an unbeaten streak in their international triumph of the Croatian World Club Championship. During the regular season the Serbian White Eagles secured their second consecutive International Division title, while St. Catharines Wolves won their first National Division title.

The league decreased in membership to 10 teams since the 2004 season, but reached an affiliation with the Montreal Impact of the USL First Division where the Impact formed the Trois-Rivières Attak to serve as a farm team. The league experienced another major increase in match attendances with some clubs averaging over 1,000 fan support per game, with the Serbian White Eagles and Trois-Rivières Attak averaging the most. The season was also notable with the introduction of the inaugural Locust CSL All Star Game played on July 28, 2007 at Windsor Stadium.

== Changes from 2006 season ==
The league decreased to 10 teams after the folding of the Caribbean Selects, and the hiatus of the Brampton Stallions. The Stallions' ownership earlier announced their intentions of selling their franchise in late 2006 and ultimately joined the Ontario Soccer League amateur circuit in 2007. Oakville Blue Devils moved to Scarborough, Toronto in order to become the Canadian Lions, and were transferred to the International Conference. The CSL maintained its presence in Quebec with the owners of Laval Dynamites securing a deal with the Montreal Impact of the USL First Division to form the Trois-Rivières Attak which served as a farm team for the Impact.

== Teams ==
Team	City	Stadium	Manager
Canadian Lions	Toronto, Ontario (Scarborough)	Birchmount Stadium	Goran Miscevic
Italia Shooters	Vaughan, Ontario (Woodbridge)	St. Joan Of Arc Turf Field	Tony De Thomasis
London City	London, Ontario (Westmount)	Cove Road Stadium	Sean Gauss
North York Astros	Toronto, Ontario (North York)	Esther Shiner Stadium	Rafael Carbajal
Portuguese Supra	Toronto, Ontario (Etobicoke)	Centennial Park Stadium	Paulo Almos
Serbian White Eagles	Toronto, Ontario (Etobicoke)	Centennial Park Stadium	Dušan Belić
St. Catharines Wolves	St. Catharines, Ontario (Vansickle)	Club Roma Stadium	James McGillivray
Toronto Croatia	Mississauga, Ontario	Hershey Centre	Milodrag Akmadzic
Trois-Rivières Attak	Trois-Rivières, Quebec	Stade de l'UQTR	Marc Dos Santos
Windsor Border Stars	Windsor, Ontario	Windsor Stadium	Pat Hilton

Location of CSL teams outside of Toronto for the 2007 CSL season.
National Division International Division
Location of CSL teams in Toronto for the 2007 CSL season.
National Division International Division

== Final standings ==
=== International Division ===
Pos	Team	Pld	W	D	L	GF	GA	GD	Pts	Qualification
1	Serbian White Eagles (A, C)	22	14	3	5	55	31	+24	45	Qualification for Playoffs
2	Toronto Croatia (A, O)	22	10	11	1	42	16	+26	41	Qualification for Playoffs
3	Italia Shooters (A)	22	11	7	4	44	17	+27	40	Qualification for Playoffs
4	Canadian Lions (A)	22	6	9	7	40	36	+4	27	Qualification for Playoffs
5	Portuguese Supra	22	4	5	13	31	42	−11	17	

Updated to match(es) played on October 8, 2007. Source: http://www.rocketrobinsoccerintoronto.com/reports07/07cswk22.htm
Rules for classification: 1) points; 2) goal difference; 3) number of goals scored.
(A) Advance to a further round; (C) Champions; (O) Play-off winners

=== National Division ===
Pos	Team	Pld	W	D	L	GF	GA	GD	Pts	Qualification
1	St. Catharines Wolves (A, C)	22	12	6	4	36	19	+17	42	Qualification for Playoffs
2	Trois-Rivières Attak (A)	22	10	8	4	48	29	+19	38	Qualification for Playoffs
3	North York Astros (A)	22	5	5	12	32	55	−23	20	Qualification for Playoffs
4	Windsor Border Stars (A)	22	5	4	13	33	49	−16	19	Qualification for Playoffs
5	London City	22	3	2	17	15	82	−67	11	

Updated to match(es) played on October 8, 2007. Source: http://www.rocketrobinsoccerintoronto.com/reports07/07cswk22.htm
Rules for classification: 1) points; 2) goal difference; 3) number of goals scored.
(A) Advance to a further round; (C) Champions

== CSL Championship playoffs ==
QuarterFinals; 10 & 11 October 2007
1	Serbian White Eagles	2
8	Windsor Border Stars	1
5	`Italia Shooters	0
4	Trois-Rivières Attak	3
2	St. Catharines Wolves (p)	0 (10)
7	Canadian Lions	0 (9)
3	Toronto Croatia (a.e.t.)	4
6	North York Astros	2

SemiFinals; 20 & 21 October 2007
1	Serbian White Eagles	2
4	Trois-Rivières Attak	1
2	St. Catharines Wolves	2
3	Toronto Croatia	3

CSL Final; 27 & 28 October 2007 @ 5:00pm & 3:00pm Esther Shiner Stadium, Toronto, Ontario
1	Serbian White Eagles	1	0
3	Toronto Croatia	4	0

=== Quarterfinals ===
October 13, 2007	Trois-Rivières Attak	3–0	Italia Shooters	Trois-Rivières, Quebec
4:00 ET	Lesage 22'; Mayard 55'; Kolić 88'	[ (Report)]		Stadium: Stade de l'UQTR; Attendance: 553

October 14, 2007	St. Catharines Wolves	0–0 (a.e.t.) (9–10 p)	Canadian Lions	St. Catharines, Ontario
4:00 ET		(Report)		Stadium: Club Roma Stadium; Attendance: 500

October 14, 2007	Toronto Croatia	4–2 (a.e.t.)	North York Astros	Mississauga, Ontario
7:00 ET	Mario Pupić 64', 105'; Fitzwilliams 90', 95'	(Report)	Gil Vainshtein 17'; Selvin Lammie 27'	Stadium: Hershey Centre; Attendance: 200

October 14, 2007	Serbian White Eagles	2–1	Windsor Border Stars	Toronto, Ontario
7:00 ET	Budalić 26'; Kokot 61'	(Report)	Aaron Byrd 54'	Stadium: Esther Shiner Stadium; Attendance: 250; Referee: David Barrie (Ontario)

=== Semifinals ===
October 20, 2007	St. Catharines Wolves	2–3	Toronto Croatia	Toronto, Ontario
4:00 ET	Danny Gallagher 41'; Arnoldo Magnotta 59'	(Report)	Fitzwilliams 11'; Tihomir Maletic 28', 44'	Stadium: Esther Shiner Stadium; Attendance: 175; Referee: David Barrie (Ontario)

October 21, 2007	Serbian White Eagles	2–1	Trois-Rivières Attak	Toronto, Ontario
5:00 ET	Kokot 6'; Dragorad Milićević 25'	(Report)	Lesage 84'	Stadium: Esther Shiner Stadium; Attendance: 500; Referee: Isaac Raymond (Ontario)

=== CSL Championship ===
October 27, 2007	Toronto Croatia	4–1	Serbian White Eagles	Toronto, Ontario
5:00 ET	Jonathon Bustamante 12', 47'; Mario Pupic 19'; Fitzwilliams 70'	(Report) []	Dragorad Milićević 13'	Stadium: Esther Shiner Stadium; Attendance: 300; Referee: Silviu Petrescu (Ontario)

October 28, 2007	Serbian White Eagles	0–0	Toronto Croatia	Toronto, Ontario
3:00 ET		(Report) []		Stadium: Esther Shiner Stadium; Attendance: 900

== Format change for Rogers Cup finals ==
Due to Toronto Croatia and the Serbian White Eagles playing for the Championship Cup, the CSL decided to change the format to a two-leg game rather than the standard knockout. The first game was played on Friday, October 27, and was played in front of only Croatian fans, with the team serving as the home side. The next day, October 28, the White Eagles were the home side, and their fans were the only ones permitted at the game.

== All-Star Game ==
July 28, 2007	National Division All Stars	0 - 5	International Division All Stars	Windsor, Ontario
7:30 pm		[ Report]	Pereira 12', 17'; Viciknez 62', 70'; Milos Scepanovic 81'	Stadium: Windsor Stadium; Attendance: 700

National Division All Stars
Pos.	Name	Team
Squad
GK	Anthony Santilli	Windsor Border Stars
D	Marco Peeters	London City
D	Roy Beishuizen	London City
D	Filip Rocca	Windsor Border Stars
D	Brian Carbajal	North York Astros
MF	Jeff Hodgson	Windsor Border Stars
MF	Nick Aragona	St. Catharines Roma Wolves
MF	Tony Mermigas	St. Catharines Roma Wolves
MF	David Diplacido	North York Astros
F	Aaron Byrd	Windsor Border Stars
F	Carlo Arghittu	St. Catharines Wolves
Squad
GK	Haidar Al-Shaïbani	North York Astros
D	Geoffrey Attard	St. Catharines Roma Wolves
MF	Camilio Gonzalez	London City
F	Radek Papiez	Windsor Border Stars
F	Alessandro Bancheri	North York Astros
Head coach
	Pat Hilton	Windsor Border Stars

International Division All Stars
Pos.	Name	Team
Squad
GK	Camilo Benzi	Italia Shooters
D	Dejan Jakovic	Canadian Lions
D	Desmond Humphrey	Italia Shooters
D	Mirko Medic	Serbian White Eagles
D	Halburto Harris	Toronto Croatia
MF	Helio Pereira	Portuguese Supra
MF	Nikola Budalic	Serbian White Eagles
MF	Milos Scepanovic	Serbian White Eagles
MF	Robert Grnja	Toronto Croatia
F	Evan Milward	Canadian Lions
F	Sasa Viciknez	Serbian White Eagles
Squad
GK	Matthew Willis	Canadian Lions
D	Fitzroy Christie	Italia Shooters
MF	Bill Androutsos	Italia Shooters
F	Tomislav Ples	Toronto Croatia
F	Alex Braletic	Serbian White Eagles
Head coach
	Sinisa Ninkovic	Serbian White Eagles

== 2007 scoring leaders ==
Full article: CSL Golden Boot

Position	Player's name	Nationality	Club	Goals
1	Nicolas Lesage	Canada	Trois-Rivières Attak	20
2	Gabriel Pop	Romania	Serbian White Eagles	18
3	Evan Milward	Canada	Canadian Lions	15
-	Darko Kolić	Serbia	Trois-Rivières Attak	15
5	Aaron Byrd	United States	Windsor Border Stars	14
6	Saša Viciknez	Serbia	Serbian White Eagles	13
-	Antonio Stranges	Canada	St. Catharines Wolves	13
8	Kadian Lecky	Canada	Italia Shooters	10
9	Helio Pereira	Brazil	Portuguese Supra	9
-	Carlo Arghittu	Canada	St. Catharines Wolves	9
-	Tihomir Maletić	Croatia	Toronto Croatia	9

== CSL Executive Committee and Staff ==
A list of the 2007 CSL Executive Committee.

Position	Name	Nationality
Commissioner:	Cary Kaplan	(Canada) Canadian
Executive Director:	Stan Adamson	(England) English
Director of Discipline:	Clifford Dell	(Canada) Canadian
Director of Officials:	Walter Kirchner	(Romania) Romanian
Marketing Manager:	Brian Krinberg	(Canada) Canadian
Office Manager:	Janet Leonard	(Canada) Canadian
League Administration/PR:	Chelsea McAllister Nadler	(Canada) Canadian
Referee-in-Chief:	Hugh Elliott	(Canada) Canadian
Legal Counsel:	Ira Greenspoon	(Canada) Canadian
Financial Auditor:	John Morgan	(Canada) Canadian

== Individual awards ==
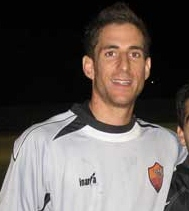
Claudio Perri was named the Goalkeeper of the Year

The annual CSL awards ceremony was held on November 4, 2007 at the La Contessa Banquet Hall in North York, Toronto. For the second straight season the International Division teams accumulated the majority of the awards. Trois-Rivières Attak went home with the most awards with 3 wins. Former Montreal Impact player Nicolas Lesage received both the Golden Boot and MVP, and the club was given the Fair Play award. The league champions Toronto Croatia produced both the Defender and Rookie of the Years. Domagoj Sain became the first player in CSL history to win the Defender of the Year three times. Former 2.HNL veteran Tihomir Maletic was chosen as the Rookie of the Year.

Claudio Perri, former Atlanta University alumni was named the Goalkeeper of the Year after helping St. Catharines Wolves post the best defensive record throughout the season. James McGilivary was recognized with the honor of Coach of the Year after leading St. Catharines to their first trophy the National Division title in five years. The President of the Year award was renamed the Harry Paul Gauss award in honor of Harry Gauss, and its inaugural recipient was Bruno Ierullo. Joe Fletcher, who later went on to officiate matches at the international level and Major League Soccer was recognized with the Referee of the Year award.

Award	Player (Club)
CSL Most Valuable Player	Nicolas Lesage (Trois-Rivières Attak)
CSL Golden Boot	Nicolas Lesage (Trois-Rivières Attak)
CSL Goalkeeper of the Year Award	Claudio Perri (St. Catharines Wolves)
CSL Defender of the Year Award	Domagoj Šain (Toronto Croatia)
CSL Rookie of the Year Award	Tihomir Maletić (Toronto Croatia)
CSL Coach of the Year Award	James McGilivary (St. Catharines Wolves)
Harry Paul Gauss Award	Bruno Ierullo (North York Astros)
CSL Referee of the Year Award	Joe Fletcher
CSL Fair Play Award	Trois-Rivières Attak
