= Evan Milward =

Canadian former soccer player (born 1984)

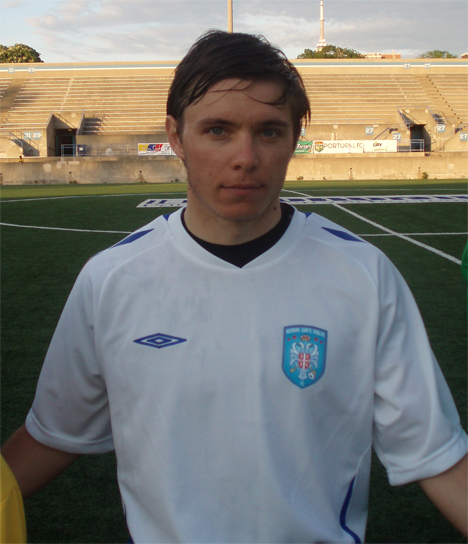
- Milward in 2009

Personal information
- Date of birth: 22 December 1984 (age 41)
- Place of birth: Arnprior, Ontario, Canada
- Height: 5 ft 7 in (1.70 m)
- Position: Striker

Youth career
- 2005–2007: Toronto Varsity Blues

Senior career*
Years	Team	Apps	(Gls)
2006	Italia Shooters	10	(1)
2007	Canadian Lions	22	(15)
2008	Rochester Rhinos	13	(0)
2009	Serbian White Eagles	3	(0)
- * Club domestic league appearances and goals

Evan Milward (born December 22, 1984) is a Canadian former soccer player who played in the Canadian Soccer League and the USL First Division.

== Career ==
Milward began playing soccer at the college level for the Toronto Varsity Blues, and was named to the 2nd All-Canadian team in 2006. During his tenure at Toronto he completed a degree in Fine Art and History. In 2006, he began his professional career by signing with Italia Shooters of the Canadian Soccer League. He made his debut for the club on May 19, 2006 in a match against Serbian White Eagles. For the 2007 season he was transferred to division rivals the Canadian Lions, where he registered 15 goals making him the club's leading scorer. He helped the Scarborough side clinch a postseason berth by finishing fourth in the International Division. He was also selected for the CSL All Star match and played with the International Division All-Star team.

After unsuccessful trial with Swansea City F.C. he went abroad to the United States to sign with the Rochester Rhinos of the USL First Division. During his tenure with Rochester he played in 13 matches. In 2008, he returned to the CSL to sign with the Serbian White Eagles and made his debut on May 22, 2009 against Portugal FC.
