= Alpha Ibrahim Bah =

Guinean footballer (born 1990)

Alpha Bah
Personal information
- Full name: Alpha Ibrahim Bah
- Date of birth: 1 January 1990 (age 36)
- Place of birth: Guéckédougou, Guinea
- Height: 1.80 m (5 ft 11 in)
- Position: Winger

Youth career
- VV Scharn
- MVV

Senior career*
Years	Team	Apps	(Gls)
2008–2011	MVV	26	(0)
2011	Eindhoven	4	(0)
2012–2014	EHC Hoensbroek		
- * Club domestic league appearances and goals

Alpha Ibrahim Bah (born 1 January 1990) is a Guinean former professional footballer who played as a winger.

== Career ==
Bah started playing football at VV Scharn before joining Eerste Divisie club MVV in the summer of 2008. He made his professional debut on 8 August 2008, replacing Bülent Akın at half-time of a 0–0 away draw against FC Zwolle. He made a total of 29 appearances for MVV during his three seasons at the club.

On 9 July 2011, Bah signed a one-year amateur contract with Eerste Divisie club Eindhoven after a successful trial. He made his debut for the club on 5 August, coming on as a 67th-minute substitute for Leon Kantelberg in a 3–0 victory against Emmen on the first matchday of the 2011–12 season. He made only four appearances for the club before agreeing to a mutual termination of his contract in October 2011, as the conditions were deemed insufficient for his development. Following discussions with technical manager Hans Smulders and head coach Ernest Faber, it was decided that he would continue his career elsewhere. He then played shortly for amateur club EHC Hoensbroek between 2012 and 2014.
