= Pat Hilton =

English footballer and manager

Personal information
- Date of birth: 1 May 1954 (age 72)
- Place of birth: Aylesham, England
- Position: Forward

Senior career*
Years	Team	Apps	(Gls)
1972–1974	Brighton & Hove Albion	20	(2)
1974–1975	Blackburn Rovers	16	(2)
1975–1977	Gillingham	28	(1)
1976–1977	→ Aldershot (loan)	13	(0)
1977–1978	Southport	27	(5)

Managerial career
- 2004–2008: Windsor Border Stars
- * Club domestic league appearances and goals

Pat Hilton (born 1 May 1954) is an English former football player and manager. He played in The Football League with several noted clubs like Blackburn Rovers, and Gillingham. After retiring from football he made the transition to managing, and coached the Windsor Border Stars of the Canadian Professional Soccer League.

== Playing career ==
Hilton began his career with Brighton & Hove Albion in the Football League Third Division in 1972, and played under the management of Brian Clough, and Peter Taylor. In 1974, he signed with Blackburn Rovers, and won the Football League Third Division which promoted the club to the Football League Second Division. The following year he signed with Gillingham, where he appeared in 28 matches and recorded one goal. In 1976, he was loaned to Aldershot where he appeared in 13 matches. In 1977, he signed a contract with Southport, and finished with the club with 27 matches, and recorded five goals.

== Managerial career ==
After retiring from competitive football Hilton managed Gillingham's youth team, and later moved to Michigan. In 2004, he was appointed the first head coach for the newly formed Windsor Border Stars of the Canadian Professional Soccer League. In his debut season with Windsor he led the team to a third-place finish in the Western Conference, and clinched a postseason berth. He also claimed the club's first piece of silverware by winning the Open Canada Cup. For his achievements he was awarded by the league with the CPSL Coach of the Year award. During his five-year tenure with the organization he made the playoffs with the club four consecutive years, won two Open Canada Cups, and one AISL Championship.
