= Patrick Leduc =

Canadian soccer player

Personal information
- Full name: Patrick Leduc
- Date of birth: December 26, 1977 (age 48)
- Place of birth: Saint-Lambert, Quebec, Canada
- Height: 6 ft 0 in (1.83 m)
- Position: Midfielder

Youth career
- FC Sélect Rive-Sud

College career
Years	Team	Apps	(Gls)
- Fairleigh Dickinson Knights

Senior career*
Years	Team	Apps	(Gls)
1998–1999	Twin Cities Tornado		
2000–2010	Montreal Impact	221	(10)
2006	FC Bex	3	(0)

International career^{‡}
2005	Canada	3	(0)
2013	Québec		

Managerial career
- 2013: Québec
- * Club domestic league appearances and goals as of October 3, 2010 ‡ National team caps and goals as of May 13, 2009

Patrick Leduc (born December 26, 1977, in Saint-Lambert, Quebec) is a Canadian soccer player who formerly played for Montreal Impact in the USSF Division 2 Professional League.

== Career ==
=== Youth and amateur ===
Before turning pro Leduc played amateur soccer with FC Sélect Rive-Sud in the Ligue de Soccer Elite Quebec. He also played for U15 and U17 Quebec select teams winning two silver medals, and later played for Twin Cities Tornado in the USL Premier Development League in 1998 and 1999.

=== Professional ===
Leduc was signed by Montreal Impact of the USL First Division in 2000, but in his first two seasons was a bit-player, featuring in only a handful of games. Leduc finally broke into the first team in 2002, and spent over 1,000 minutes on the field for the first time of his career with the Impact, picking up his first assists in a 3–1 win against the Pittsburgh Riverhounds on June 9. He also helped claim the Voyageurs Cup. In his fourth season with the club he scored his first goal, in an August 3 game against the Riverhounds. His second goal was the winner in 2–0 victory over Calgary Storm, which clinched first place in Eastern Conference. He was one of 11 Impact players to finish the season with over 1,500 minutes played.

In 2004 Leduc was one of five Impact players to play more than 2,000 minutes during the season, he scored three goals, and added more four assists. He was part of the starting eleven for the championship game, which the Impact won 2–0 against the Seattle Sounders, claiming the championship for the second time in club history, and for the third consecutive year helped claim the Voyageurs Cup.

In 2005 Leduc helped the Impact to a 15-game undefeated streak, setting a new league record, while helping the team clinch the regular season title. During the 2006 season he scored a goal against the Minnesota Thunder in a 4–0 victory, and later played his 150th career game with the Impact on August 31 against Portland Timbers, becoming only the 7th player in club history to do so. Later in the season he reached the 10,000 career minutes played mark with Montreal - only the 8th person in club history.

On January 5, 2009, the Montreal Impact announced the re-signing of Leduc to a two-year contract for the 2009 season.

Leduc announced his retirement on March 29, 2011.

=== International ===
Leduc was invited to a Canada national soccer team training camp for the first time in In January 2005, and played his first game on July 2, 2005, against Honduras. He was selected to represent Canada at the 2005 CONCACAF Gold Cup, and was in the starting 11 for the first two games against Costa Rica and the United States, although both games resulted in a loss and Canada were knocked out of the tournament.

On January 22, 2006, he was selected for the international friendly against the United States in San Diego, but was an unused substitute in a 0–0 tie.

=== Post-retirement ===
Leduc is now a color commentator/analyst for broadcaster RDS, covering the Montreal Impact and international soccer.

== Honors ==
=== Montreal impact ===
- USL First Division Championship (2): 2004, 2009
- USL First Division Commissioners Cup (2): 2005, 2006
- Voyageurs Cup Champions (7): 2002, 2003, 2004, 2005, 2006, 2007, 2008

== Career stats ==
Team	Season	League	Domestic League			Domestic Playoffs			Domestic Cup^{1}			Concacaf Competition^{2}			Total		
Team	Season	League	Apps	Goals	Assists	Apps	Goals	Assists	Apps	Goals	Assists	Apps	Goals	Assists	Apps	Goals	Assists
Montreal Impact	2000	A-League	15	0	0	-	-	-	-	-	-	-	-	-	15	0	0
Montreal Impact	2001	A-League	12	0	0	-	-	-	-	-	-	-	-	-	12	0	0
Montreal Impact	2002	A-League	23	0	4	3	0	0	-	-	-	-	-	-	26	0	4
Montreal Impact	2003	A-League	26	2	0	1	0	0	-	-	-	-	-	-	27	2	0
Montreal Impact	2004	A-League	26	3	4	5	1	0	-	-	-	-	-	-	31	4	4
Montreal Impact	2005	USL-1	24	0	3	2	0	0	-	-	-	-	-	-	26	0	3
Montreal Impact	2006	USL-1	25	1	2	2	0	0	-	-	-	-	-	-	27	1	2
Montreal Impact	2007	USL-1	27	3	1	2	0	0	-	-	-	-	-	-	29	3	1
Montreal Impact	2008	USL-1	22	1	1	-	-	-	4	0	1	1	0	0	27	1	2
Montreal Impact	2009	USL-1	3	0	0	6	0	0	-	-	-	-	-	-	9	0	0
Montreal Impact	2010	USSF D2	19	0	1	2	0	0	2	0	0	-	-	-	22	0	1
Career Total		-	222	10	16	23	1	0	5	0	1	1	0	0	251	11	17

Last update: September 5, 2010

1) Lamar Hunt U.S. Open Cup (American Based Clubs) – Nutrilite Canadian Cup (Canadian Based Clubs)
2) Concacaf Champions League
