= Trois-Rivières Attak =

Canadian former soccer team

Attak de Trois-Rivières
- Founded: 2006
- Dissolved: 2010
- Stadium: Stade de l'UQTR
- Capacity: 1500
- Chairman: Tony Ianitto
- Head coach: Philippe Eullaffroy
- League: Canadian Soccer League
- 2009: Champions
Home colours	Away colours

Trois-Rivières Attak was a Canadian soccer team that played three seasons in the Canadian Soccer League. They formally served as a reserve and academy team for the USL First Division side Montreal Impact. The club was an instant success within the league, winning titles in all three seasons when it competed in the CSL. In 2010, when the Montreal Impact founded their own academy the team ceased operating as a farm team, because of the ended cooperation with the Impact; they announced that they would take a one-year absence from the Canadian Soccer League in 2010 and return for the 2011 season. The team did not return for the 2011 season.

== History ==
On November 15, 2006, the Montreal Impact, along with Laval Dynamites owner Tony Ianitto announced the creation of a feeder team in Trois-Rivières, and that the name would be chosen from the result of a contest. The club's home matches were played at the Stade de l'UQTR located at the University of Quebec at Trois-Rivieres campus.

The name Trois-Rivières Attak FC and the logo were presented to the public on January 17, 2007, together with the first signings of CSL veterans Nicolas Lesage and Jean-Louis Bessé. In the same press conference the new expansion club unveiled their first head coach Marc Dos Santos, who coached previously in the Ligue de Soccer Elite Quebec. For their inaugural season Trois-Riveres received sponsorship from Carlsburg and Puma. While Le Nouvelliste, and Énergie provided media coverage for the team. Dos Santos mobilized a roster with players of CSL and USL experience acquiring the likes of Darko Kolić, Andrew Olivieri, Paul Moran, Sita-Taty Matondo, and Rachid Madkour. The Attak kicked off their season with a 0–0 draw against the Toronto Croatia on May 13, 2007. A week after Elkana Mayard scored the club's first goal in history in a 2–1 defeat to the Serbian White Eagles at Centennial Park Stadium.

The club were a surprise in their inaugural season by being competitive in the CSL right from the beginning. In their first season they contributed significantly to the overall increase in attendance of league matches with Trois-Rivieres and Serbian White Eagles leading. The Attak performed outstandingly in the 2007 Open Canada Cup tournament claiming their first trophy in the club's history – defeating Columbus Clan F.C. in a 3–0 victory. The team concluded the season by finishing second in the National Division enabling them to secure a playoff berth. In the postseason the Attak faced the defending 2006 champions the Italia Shooters in the quarterfinals and advanced to the next round by defeating Italia by a score of 3–0. Their playoff run came to an end in the semi-finals losing to a score of 2–1 to the Serbian White Eagles. At the CSL Awards Banquet, Attak forward Nicolas Lesage was awarded the Canadian Soccer League MVP Award, and the CSL Golden Boot becoming the first person in CSL history to win two individual awards in a season.

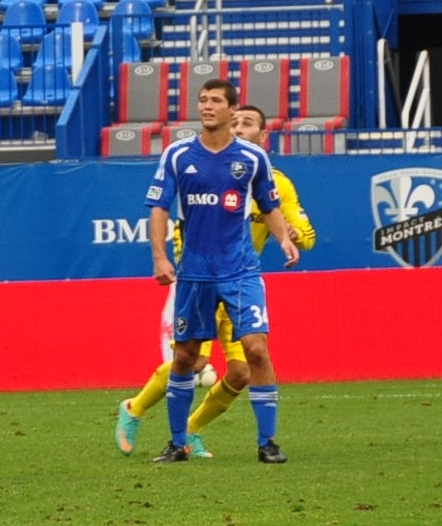
Canadian International Karl Ouimette began his career with Trois-Rivières Attak.

In 2008, Dos Santos resumed his coaching duties and maintained the majority of his 2007 team roster, but signed young prospects like Pierre-Rudolph Mayard, Cristian Nuñez, and had at his disposal Montreal Impact reserve players. The Attak had a remarkable start to the season by recording a 13-game undefeated streak. The Attaks persistent performance led to their second piece of silverware the National Division title and finished with the best defense record allowing the fewest goals. The club had an outstanding postseason defeating St. Catharines Wolves in the quarterfinals and thrashing Portugal FC 7–0 in the semi-finals. In the finals they met the Serbian White Eagles, the club which ousted the Attak in the previous playoffs. The match was a 2–2 draw which led to a penalty shootout which resulted in a 2–1 victory in penalties for the White Eagles. At the conclusion of the season the Attak were awarded the Fair Play and Respect Award and Andrew Olivieri was awarded the CSL Goalkeeper of the Year.

On March 12, 2009, Marc Dos Santos was appointed the assistant coach for the Montreal Impact and was replaced by Philippe Eullaffroy. Eullaffroy made major changes to the Attak roster replacing the majority of veterans with younger players – only four senior players from the previous season were given contracts. The Attak had another tremendous season defending their National Division title and for the second year in a row allowed the fewest goals throughout the season. In the postseason history would repeat itself again as the Attak would face once more the Serbian White Eagles in the finals. The Attak would end up winning their first CSL Championship by defeating the International Division and defending CSL champions the Serbian White Eagles by a score of 3–2 on penalty kicks. Head Coach Philippe Eullaffroy was awarded the CSL Coach of the Year, and Reda Agourram was awarded the CSL Rookie of the Year and the CSL Golden Boot.

On March 23, 2010, the Trois-Rivières Attak announced a one-year sabbatical from competition, due to the end of cooperation between the Montreal Impact which acquired a new franchise in the CSL by the name of the Montreal Impact Academy. Team owner Tony Iannitto waived his territorial and players' rights and relinquished the players' rights to the Montreal Impact.

== Home stadium ==
The Attak played their home games at the Stade de l'UQTR on the campus of the Université du Québec and sometimes indoor at Centre Sportif Alphonse-Desjardins in Trois-Rivières.

== Honours ==
- Canadian Soccer League
  - Winners (1): 2009
  - Runners-up (1): 2008
- Open Canada Cup
  - Winners (1): 2007
- Canadian Soccer League National Division Champions
  - Winners (2): 2008, 2009

== Year-by-year ==
Year	League	Regular season	Overall	Playoffs	Open Canada Cup
2007	CSL	2nd, National	5th	Semi-Finals	Champions
2008	CSL	1st, National	1st	2nd	no competition held
2009	CSL	1st, National	1st	Champions	no competition held

== Former coaches ==
Years	Name	Nation
2007–2008	Marc Dos Santos	Canada
2009	Philippe Eullaffroy	France

== All-time leaders ==
=== Most appearances ===
Mo.	Name	Career	Appearances
1	(Canada) Olivier Brett	2007–2008	65
2	(Tunisia) Essafi Amir	2007–2008	32
3	(Ivory Coast) Jean-Louis Bessé	2007–2009	30

=== Most goals scored ===
No.	Name	Career	Goals
1	(Canada) Nicolas Lesage	2007–2009	24
2	(Serbia) Darko Kolić	2007	13
3	(Canada) Pierre-Rudolph Mayard	2007–2008	8

== Notable players ==
Canada

- Reda Agourram (2009)
- Félix Brillant (2009)
- Kevin Cossette (2009)
- Massimo Di Ioia (2008-09)
- David Fronimadis (2007)
- Charles Gbeke (2008)
- Nicolas Lesage (2007-08)
- Sita-Taty Matondo (2001)
- Elkana Mayard (2007-09)
- Pierre-Rudolph Mayard (2007-08)
- Cristian Nuñez (2008)
- Andrew Olivieri (2007-08)
- Karl Ouimette (2009-10)
- Jon Paul Piques (2007)
- António Ribeiro 2008
- Alex Surprenant (2007)
- Maxim Tissot (2008-09)

Antigua and Barbuda

- Peter Byers (2009)

Bolivia

- Roland Vargas-Aguilera (2008)

France

- Cédric Joqueviel (2007)

Ivory Coast

- Jean-Louis Bessé (2007-08)

Jamaica

- Fabian Dawkins (2007)

Morocco

- Hicham Aâboubou (2007)
- Rachid Madkour (2007)

Romania

- Andrei Bădescu (2009)
- Mircea Ilcu (2009)

United States

- Tony Donatelli (2008)
- Paul Moran (2007)
- Andrew Weber (2007)
