= Ligue de soccer élite du Québec =

Ligue de Soccer Élite Quebec
- Founded: 1992
- Folded: 2024
- Country: Canada
- Divisions: 1st Division; 2nd Division
- Relegation to: 7 regional AA leagues
- Website: LSEQ

The Ligue de soccer élite du Québec (lit. 'Quebec Elite Soccer League') was the top amateur league in Quebec, operating at a level below the semi-professional Ligue1 Québec. It operates a number of youth and gender specific divisions and is operated by the Fédération du Soccer du Québec. In 2025, the league was merged into LS Pro with teams joining the new Ligue2 and Ligue3 divisions.

The senior men's division was composed of a first and second division. There was promotion and relegation between the two divisions and between the second division and the regional AA leagues. The senior female division consisted of a single division.

== History ==
Soccer in Quebec before the formation of the LSEQ was spread between various different senior and junior leagues throughout the province. In 1992, the different rival leagues such as the LMSJQ, LMSSQ and Quebec National Soccer League (LNSQ) merged in order to form the Ligue de soccer élite du Québec (LSEQ). The league was initially structured with two divisions with a promotion and relegation system with Ira Turetsky as the inaugural league president. In 1993, five of the former LNSQ clubs Corfinium St-Leonard, Cosmos de LaSalle, Luso Stars Mont-Royal, Montreal Croatia, and Montreal Ramblers joined the Canadian National Soccer League (CNSL) to form the league's Eastern Division.

== Organization ==
The senior men's division is composed of a 1st Division and 2nd Division. There is promotion and relegation between division 1 and 2, between division 2 and regional AA leagues. The senior female division consists of a single division. The league also runs, U-15, U-16, U-17, U-18, U-19, and U-21 divisions for both genders. The season runs from early May to late September, and is followed by playoffs that take place in October, which determine the Quebec champion for each division. Promotion and relegation exists between the various divisions.

The caliber of the LSÉQ is identified as "AAA", that is to say the highest level in Quebec. The "AA" caliber corresponds to regional leagues, and the "A" caliber to recreational or local leagues.

== Champions ==
- 2006 Sélect de Trois-Rivières
- 2007 Corfinium AFA St-Léonard
- 2009 Royal-Sélect Beauport
- 2010 Royal-Sélect Beauport
- 2011 Corfinium St-Léonard
- 2012 Royal-Sélect Beauport
- 2013 Royal-Sélect Beauport
- 2014 Étoiles de l'Est
- 2015 Rapides de Chaudière-Ouest
- 2016 Panellinios
- 2017 Royal-Sélect Beauport
- 2018 Celtix du Haut-Richelieu
- 2019 Kodiak Charlesbourg
- 2020 CS Panellinios
- 2021 Boucherville
