= 2011 Canadian Soccer League season =

Givova Canadian Soccer League First Division
- Season: 2011
- Champions: SC Toronto (regular season); Toronto Croatia (playoffs)
- Matches: 181
- Goals: 607 (3.35 per match)
- Top goalscorer: Stefan Vukovic 18
- Best goalkeeper: Scott Cliff
- Biggest home win: SC Toronto 8–0 Windsor Stars (2 September 2011)
- Biggest away win: St. Catharines Wolves 0–4 Windsor Stars (22 July 2011); Montreal Impact Academy 0–4 SC Toronto (30 July 2011); St. Catharines Wolves 1–5 TFC Academy (3 August 2011); London City 1–5 Capital City F.C. (5 August 2011); Brampton United 0–4 Toronto Croatia (4 September 2011); Brantford Galaxy 0–4 Capital City F.C. (10 September 2011); North York Astros 1–5 Toronto Croatia (11 September 2011)
- Highest scoring: Montreal Impact Academy 7–2 North York Astros (2 July 2011) (9 goals)

The 2011 Canadian Soccer League season (known as the Givova Canadian Soccer League for sponsorship reasons) was the 14th since its establishment where a total of 28 teams from Ontario and Quebec took part in the league. The season began on Saturday 6 May 2011, and concluded on 29 October 2011. Toronto Croatia won their fourth championship (seventh including Canadian National Soccer League titles) in a 1–0 victory over Capital City F.C. in the CSL Championship final at Centennial Park Stadium in Toronto. The regular season saw SC Toronto claim their second regular season title, while Mississauga Eagles FC B won their first Second Division championship. The season saw an increase in membership to 14 teams the largest number since the 2002 season. The new entries saw the return of professional soccer to the communities of Windsor, Mississauga, and Ottawa.

After one season as commissioner Domenic Di Gironimo resigned with Vincent Ursini returning to be named his successor. The 2011 season witnessed the fruits of the CSL player developmental system as nine CSL players were selected to represent the Canada U-17 in the 2011 CONCACAF U-17 Championship. While 14 CSL players participated in the 2011 FIFA U-17 World Cup, and 4 players were selected to represent the Canada U-20 in the 2011 CONCACAF U-20 Championship. To further implement their developmental system the league formed a working relationship with the newly formed Canadian Academy of Futbol (CAF), which required their member clubs to form affiliations with academy teams.

The ownership structure of the league was reformed into an incorporated body as the CSL Association Inc in order to bring about a slow process of equalization to the status of teams, while compensating the equity owners who had heavily invested in league throughout the years. The reserve division was renamed the Second Division and grew to a record number of 14 clubs. As a result, in the increase of teams the division was further split into an East and West division. The second division continued its traditional support role as reserve teams to First Division squads, and as an entry-level division for teams that haven't met the standards for a first division club. Their television deal with Rogers TV included a new broadcasting record of 70 regular season matches, and have expanded their original coverage of Toronto teams to include the cities of London, Brantford, Mississauga, and Ottawa.

== Changes from 2010 ==
The CSL operated 2 divisions in 2011; First and Second. The reserve division has been referred to in some media releases as CSL II.

The Givova Cup play-offs were announced to include the top 8 teams. The quarter-final round was played over 2 legs and standard seeding with 1 v 8, 2 v 7, 3 v 6 and 4 v 5.

== Teams ==
A total of 14 teams contested in the league, including 11 from the 2010 season and three expansion teams.

The league featured two expansion teams, Mississauga Eagles FC, an Ottawa-based team called Capital City, and the return of Windsor Stars. Hamilton Croatia and Milltown FC did not return for the 2011 season after failing to meet the membership deadline for the 2011 season. The Milltown ownership announced future plans to form a men's non-amateur league under the jurisdiction of the Ontario Soccer Association.

In further changes, two teams changed their name prior to this season. Brampton Lions competed under the name of Brampton United, while Portugal FC were renamed SC Toronto.

Team	City	Stadium	Manager
Brampton City United	Brampton, Ontario (Bramalea)	Victoria Park Stadium	Armando Costa
Brantford Galaxy	Brantford, Ontario	Steve Brown Sports Complex	Tomo Dančetović
Capital City F.C.	Ottawa, Ontario	Terry Fox Stadium	Shaun Harris
London City	London, Ontario (Westmount)	Cove Road Stadium	Luka Shaqiri
Mississauga Eagles FC	Mississauga, Ontario	Hershey Centre	Josef Komlodi
Montreal Impact Academy	Montreal, Quebec	Saputo Stadium	Philippe Eullaffroy
North York Astros	Toronto, Ontario (North York)	Esther Shiner Stadium	Gerardo Lezcano
SC Toronto	Toronto, Ontario (Liberty Village)	Lamport Stadium	Carmine Isacco
Serbian White Eagles	Toronto, Ontario (Etobicoke)	Centennial Park Stadium	Mirko Medić (player-coach)
St. Catharines Wolves	St. Catharines, Ontario (Vansickle)	Club Roma Stadium	Carlo Arghittu
TFC Academy	Toronto, Ontario (Liberty Village)	Lamport Stadium	Danny Dichio
Toronto Croatia	Toronto, Ontario (Etobicoke)	Centennial Park Stadium	Velimir Crljen
York Region Shooters	Vaughan, Ontario (Maple)	St. Joan of Arc Turf Field	Filipe Bento
Windsor Stars	Windsor, Ontario	Windsor Stadium	Steve Vagnini

=== Coaching changes ===
Team	Outgoing coach	Manner of departure	Date of vacancy	Position in table	Incoming coach	Date of appointment
Brantford Galaxy	Lazo Džepina	Sacked	7 July 2011	10th in July	Tomo Dančetović	11 July 2011

Location of CSL teams outside of Toronto for the 2011 CSL season.
Location of CSL teams in Toronto for the 2011 CSL season.

== Results ==
Home \ Away	BRA	BNF	CC	LON	MIS	MTL	NYA	SCT	SER	STC	TFCA	TOR	WIN	YRS
Brampton United		4–0	4–3	5–2	2–1	4–0	5–0	2–4	3–3	2–1	3–2	0–4	4–1	3–0
Brantford Galaxy	0–1		0–4	1–0	2–1	4–1	0–0	1–2	0–0	5–3	2–3	0–1	1–0	3–2
Capital City	2–1	3–2		4–1	0–0	3–0	5–0	0–2	2–1	6–0	4–1	0–2	2–0	0–0
London City	0–2	1–1	1–5		2–4	1–1	2–0	1–3	1–3	1–2	2–1	0–2	1–0	1–3
Mississauga Eagles	3–1	2–0	0–1	1–0		1–3	4–0	0–2	0–1	5–1	5–1	2–1	1–1	2–0
Montreal Impact Academy	3–0	6–1	1–1	2–0	2–1		7–2	0–4	3–0	5–1	3–1	1–1	5–0	3–1
North York Astros	1–1	1–2	1–2	1–2	1–2	1–3		0–3	1–4	1–1		1–5	0–0	1–3
SC Toronto	5–2	4–1	0–0	4–2	2–1	2–0	4–0		1–1	5–1	1–0	0–1	8–0	2–1
Serbian White Eagles	3–1	2–1	0–1	1–2	0–0	2–2	1–0	0–2		7–1	1–0	1–1	2–0	0–0
St. Catharines Wolves	0–2	2–4	0–0	5–1	0–4	1–1	2–1	0–2	0–1		1–5	0–0	0–4	1–2
TFC Academy	1–4	0–1	1–2	1–1	1–2	3–1	1–1	2–1	1–2	7–0		2–0	5–2	0–1
Toronto Croatia	2–2	4–0	2–0	2–0	3–0	5–2	6–2	4–2	1–0	1–2	2–1		5–0	2–2
Windsor Stars	0–2	4–1	2–2	0–2	1–2	0–2	5–1	2–4	2–4	1–2	1–1	1–4		0–2
York Region Shooters	2–1	2–0	0–0	2–1	1–0	3–0	2–2	2–2	0–1	4–1	1–2	0–1	4–1	

Updated to match(es) played on 10 October 2011. Source: http://canadiansoccerleague.com/schedules/1results.htm
Legend: Blue = home team win; Yellow = draw; Red = away team win.

== Positions by round ==
Team ╲ Round	1	2	3	4	5	6	7	8	9	10	11	12	13	14	15	16	17	18	19	20	21	22	23	24	25	26
SC Toronto	2	1	1	1	1	1	1	1	1	1	1	1	1	1	1	1	1	1	1	1	1	1	1	1	1	1
Toronto Croatia	9	6	7	4	3	2	3	5	7	7	5	5	4	3	3	2	2	2	2	2	2	2	2	2	2	2
Capital City	13	10	5	3	2	3	2	2	2	2	2	3	2	2	2	3	4	4	3	3	3	3	3	3	3	3
Brampton United	2	2	4	7	5	4	7	7	6	5	6	4	7	5	5	4	3	3	4	4	5	6	6	5	5	4
Serbian White Eagles	6	4	6	9	7	6	5	4	4	3	4	7	6	7	6	7	7	5	6	7	6	4	4	4	4	5
Montreal Impact Academy	12	7	11	6	8	8	6	6	5	4	3	2	3	4	4	5	6	7	5	5	7	8	8	7	7	6
Mississauga Eagles	4	9	9	10	10	9	9	9	8	8	8	8	8	8	8	8	8	8	8	8	8	7	7	8	8	7
York Region Shooters	11	8	8	8	6	5	4	2	3	6	7	6	5	6	7	6	5	6	7	6	4	5	5	6	6	8
Brantford Galaxy	6	11	12	12	12	12	12	10	10	10	9	9	9	9	9	9	9	9	9	9	9	9	9	9	9	
TFC Academy	1	5	3	5	9	10	10	11	12	12	11	11	11	10	10	10	10	10	10	10	10	10	10	10	10	
London City	9	13	10	11	11	11	11	12	11	11	12	12	12	12	12	12	12	12	12	12	12	12	12	12	12	11
St. Catharines Wolves	4	3	2	2	4	7	8	8	9	9	10	10	10	11	11	11	11	11	11	11	11	11	11	11	11	12
Windsor Stars	13	14	14	14	14	14	14	14	14	14	14	14	14	13	13	14	13	13	14	13	13	13	13	13	13	13
North York Astros	8	12	13	13	13	13	13	13	13	13	13	13	13	14	14	13	14	14	13	14	14	14	14	14	14	14

Source: canadiansoccerleague.com

== Standings ==
Pos	Team	Pld	W	D	L	GF	GA	GD	Pts	Qualification
1	SC Toronto (A, C)	26	20	3	3	71	24	+47	63	Qualified for the Givova Cup play-offs
2	Toronto Croatia (A, O)	26	18	5	3	62	21	+41	59	Qualified for the Givova Cup play-offs
3	Capital City (A)	26	15	7	4	52	22	+30	52	Qualified for the Givova Cup play-offs
4	Brampton United (A)	26	15	3	8	61	43	+18	48	Qualified for the Givova Cup play-offs
5	Serbian White Eagles (A)	26	13	7	6	41	26	+15	46	Qualified for the Givova Cup play-offs
6	Montreal Impact Academy (A)	26	13	5	8	57	43	+14	44	Qualified for the Givova Cup play-offs
7	Mississauga Eagles (A)	26	13	3	10	44	29	+15	42	Qualified for the Givova Cup play-offs
8	York Region Shooters (A)	26	12	6	8	40	30	+10	42	Qualified for the Givova Cup play-offs
9	Brantford Galaxy	26	9	3	14	33	53	−20	30	
10	TFC Academy	25	8	3	14	43	44	−1	27	
11	London City	26	6	3	17	28	56	−28	21	
12	St. Catharines Wolves	26	5	4	17	28	77	−49	19	
13	Windsor Stars	26	3	4	19	28	67	−39	13	
14	North York Astros	25	0	6	19	19	72	−53	6	

Source: []
Rules for classification: 1) points; 2) goal difference; 3) number of goals scored.
(A) Advance to a further round; (C) Champions; (O) Play-off winners

== Goal scorers ==
Rank	Scorer	Club	Goals
1	(Canada) Stefan Vuković	TFC Academy	18
2	(Jamaica) Richard West	Brampton United	17
2	(Croatia) Tihomir Maletić	Toronto Croatia	17
4	(Canada) Kadian Lecky	York Region Shooters	15
5	(Canada) Alexandros Halis	SC Toronto	14
6	(Brazil) Sullivan Silva	Capital City F.C.	12
7	(Canada) Jarek Whiteman	SC Toronto	11
7	(Canada) Miloš Šćepanović	Serbian White Eagles	11
8	(Canada) Alessandro Riggi	Montreal Impact Academy	10
8	(Canada) Alex Braletic	Serbian White Eagles	9
8	(Canada) Matthew Contino	St. Catharines Wolves	9
9	(Serbia) Ranko Golijanin	Brantford Galaxy	8

== Playoffs ==
The top 8 teams will qualify for the 2-legged Quarter-finals with the winners advancing to the one game semi-finals to be hosted by the highest remaining seeds.

Team 1	Agg.	Team 2	1st leg	2nd leg
SC Toronto (1)	4 – 4 (2–4) pen.	(8) York Region Shooters	0–1	4 – 3
Toronto Croatia (2)	8–1	(7) Mississauga Eagles FC	4–0	4 – 1
Capital City F.C. (3)	3–2	(6) Montreal Impact Academy	1–1	2 – 1
Brampton United (4)	0–8	(5) Serbian White Eagles	0–2	0 – 6

Semi-Final
2	Toronto Croatia	2
8	York Region Shooters	0
3	Capital City F.C.	5
5	Serbian White Eagles	0

Final
2	Toronto Croatia	1
3	Capital City F.C.	0

=== Quarterfinals ===
7 October 2011	Mississauga Eagles FC	0–4	Toronto Croatia	Mississauga, Ontario
8:00 ET		(Report)	Pirija 18'; Vučemilović-Grgić 36'; Tihomir Maletic 54', 92'	Stadium: Hershey Centre; Attendance: 150; Referee: Justin Tasev (Ontario)

16 October 2011	Toronto Croatia	4–1	Mississauga Eagles FC	Toronto, Ontario
7:00 ET	Vučemilović-Grgić 3'; Fitzwilliams 30', 43'; Bozenko Lesina 65'	(Report)	Melo 80'	Stadium: Centennial Park Stadium; Attendance: 170; Referee: Yusri Rudolf (Ontario)

Toronto won the series on goals on aggregate, 8–1.

8 October 2011	Montreal Impact Academy	1–1	Capital City F.C.	Montreal, Quebec
1:00 ET	Lefèvre 61'	(Report)	Will Beauge 35'	Stadium: Marie Victorin Stadium

16 October 2011	Capital City F.C.	2–1	Montreal Impact Academy	Ottawa, Ontario
3:00 ET	DeFreitas 10'; Mahir Hadziresic 53'	(Report)	Luarca 77'	Stadium: Terry Fox Stadium

Capital City won the series on goals on aggregate, 3–2.

9 October 2011	York Region Shooters	1–0	SC Toronto	Vaughan, Ontario
4:00 ET	Gardner 4'	(Report)		Stadium: St. Joan of Arc Turf Field; Attendance: 100; Referee: Manuel Orellano (Ontario)

14 October 2011	SC Toronto	4–3 (a.e.t.) (2–4 p)	York Region Shooters	Toronto, Ontario
8:00 ET	Mirabelli 9', 73'; Alexandros Halis 51', 95'	(Report)	Kadian Lecky 38', 61'; Goncalo Almeida 90'	Stadium: Lamport Stadium; Attendance: 160; Referee: Gianni Facchini (Ontario)
	Penalties
	Jarek Whiteman (penalty missed); Badat (penalty scored); Adrian Pena (penalty scored); Dane Roberts (penalty missed)		Chris Turner (penalty missed); Fitzroy Christey (penalty scored); Mario Orestano (penalty scored); Jalen Brome (penalty scored); Adam Majer (penalty scored)

York Region won the series in a penalty shootout, 4–2.

9 October 2011	Brampton City United	0–2	Serbian White Eagles	Brampton, Ontario
8:00 ET		(Report)	Alex Braletic 41'; Milos Scepanovic 88'	Stadium: Victoria Park Stadium; Attendance: 300; Referee: Yusri Rudolph (Ontario)

15 October 2011	Serbian White Eagles	6–0	Brampton City United	Toronto, Ontario
8:00 ET	Selvin Lammie 24', 36'; Dimitrov 26'; Alex Braletic 51'; Milos Scepanovic 68'; Viciknez 91'	(Report)		Stadium: Centennial Park Stadium; Attendance: 120; Referee: Mohamed Abd Alla (Ontario)

Serbia won the series on goals on aggregate, 8–0.

=== Semifinals ===
23 October 2011	Capital City F.C.	5–0	Serbian White Eagles	Ottawa, Ontario
3:00 ET	Silva 32'; Mahir Hadziresic 77', 83'; William Beauge 80', 85'	(Report) (Report)		Stadium: Terry Fox Stadium; Attendance: 1000; Referee: Carolanne Chinard (Ontario)

23 October 2011	Toronto Croatia	2–0	York Region Shooters	Toronto, Ontario
7:00 ET	Keran 7'; Fitzwilliams 34'	(Report)		Stadium: Centennial Park Stadium; Attendance: 175; Referee: Justin Tasev (Ontario)

=== Givova CSL Championship ===
29 October
5:00 ET

Toronto Croatia	1–0	Capital City F.C.
Fitzwilliams 18'	Report

Centennial Park Stadium, Toronto, Ontario
Attendance: 1800
Referee: David Barrie (Ontario)

GK	1	(Croatia) Sandi Matika
RB	7	(Jamaica) Halburto Harris
CB	4	(Canada) Sven Arapovic
CB	3	(Croatia) Josip Keran
LB	15	(Trinidad and Tobago) Ainsley Deer
RM	22	(Canada) Daniel Niksic	(substituted off) 66'
CM	14	(Canada) Agustin De Medina
CM	23	(Croatia) Tonci Pirija (c)
LM	8	(Trinidad and Tobago) Hayden Fitzwilliams
ST	11	(Croatia) Marin Vučemilović-Grgić
ST	10	(Croatia) Tihomir Maletic
Substitutes:
GK	13	(Canada) Antonio Ilic
DF	6	(Canada) Mario Kulis
DF	20	(Trinidad and Tobago) Nicholas Goddard
MF	21	(Canada) Lee Hagedorn	(substituted on) 66'
FW	9	(Argentina) Hugo Herrera
FW	18	(Croatia) Bozenko Lesina
FW	19	(Canada) Niko Pesa
Manager:
(Croatia) Velimir Crljen

GK	1	(United States) Clint Irwin (c)
RB	3	(Guyana) Julien Edwards
CB	12	(United States) Casey Cordray
CB	5	(United States) Joel Bagby
LB	17	(Canada) Francis LeTourneau
RM	24	(Bermuda) Taurean Manders
CM	13	(Canada) Kenny Caceros
LM	4	(United States) Collin Harrison	(substituted off) 68'
FW	15	(Brazil) Sullivan Silva
FW	8	(Canada) Emir Zmic
FW	9	(Canada) Will Beauge
Substitutes:
GK	22	(Canada) Karl Gouabe
DF	2	(Guyana) Taylor Benjamin
DF	11	(United States) Sam Roca
MF	7	(Romania) Laszlo Csongor
FW	14	(United States) Garrett Webb
FW	18	(Canada) Junior Ellis
FW	25	(Trinidad and Tobago) Akil DeFreitas	(substituted on) 68'
Manager:
(United States) Shaun Harris

Assistant referees:
Matt Meloche
Scott Decker
Fourth official:
Justin Tasev

== CSL Executive Committee and Staff ==
The 2011 CSL Executive Committee.

Position	Name	Nationality
Commissioner:	Vincent Ursini	(Canada) Canadian
Director of Media and PR:	Stan Adamson	(England) English
League Administrator:	Pino Jazbec	(Canada) Canadian
Director of Officials:	Tony Camacho	(Portugal) Portuguese

== Individual awards ==
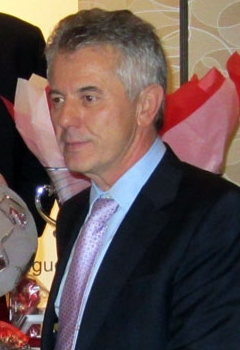
Toronto Croatia club president Joe Pavicic was given the Harry Paul Gauss award

The annual CSL awards ceremony was held at the Mississauga Convention Centre in Mississauga, Ontario on 14 November 2011. The majority of the awards went to league champions Toronto Croatia. Tihomir Maletic received his second consecutive MVP award, and Sven Arapovic was given the Defender of the Year for his contributions in establishing Toronto's solid defensive record. Velemir Crljen went home with the Coach of the Year, while club president Joe Pavicic was given the Harry Paul Gauss award.

The Golden Boot was taken by Stefan Vukovic of TFC Academy, and Scott Cliff of SC Toronto was voted the Goalkeeper of the Year. Capital City FC produced the Rookie of the Year with Akil DeFreitas, who later went abroad to the Veikkausliiga. Niagara United received their first Fair Play award for being the most disciplined team throughout the season. The CSL Referee Committee selected David Barrie, a veteran national referee with the Referee of the Year. Rogers TV producer Jeremy Milani was given a special service award for promoting CSL matches throughout the years.

Award	Player (Club)
CSL Most Valuable Player	Tihomir Maletic (Toronto Croatia)
CSL Golden Boot	Stefan Vukovic (TFC Academy)
CSL Goalkeeper of the Year Award	Scott Cliff (SC Toronto)
CSL Defender of the Year Award	Sven Arapovic (Toronto Croatia)
CSL Rookie of the Year Award	Akil DeFreitas (Capital City FC)
CSL Coach of the Year Award	Velimir Crljen (Toronto Croatia)
Harry Paul Gauss Award	Joe Pavicic (Toronto Croatia)
CSL Referee of the Year Award	David Barrie
CSL Fair Play Award	Niagara United
Special Award	Jeremy Milani

== Second Division ==
Canadian Soccer League Second Division
- Season: 2011
- Champions: Mississauga Eagles FC B
- Supporters' Shield: SC Toronto B (East Conference); Niagara United (West Conference)
- Matches: 126
- Goals: 525 (4.17 per match)
- Top goalscorer: Jorgo Nika (16)

The CSL Second Division was originally set up to be the Reserve League. In 2011, that was adjusted to include an academy team, Kingston Prospect FC and 2 clubs (Niagara United and Kitchener Waterloo United FC) which didn't meet the standards for a First Division club by the deadline date. Currently there are no formal plans for promotion and relegation. One rule that was implemented in the 2011 season was that teams must have a maximum of 4 U-23 players in their rosters. The division expanded to a record number of 14 teams, and was split into an East and West division. Other new additions to the division was the return of Toronto Croatia's reserve squad, and the debut of London City's reserve team. During the regular season both Niagara United, and SC Toronto B secured their Second Division titles. While in the postseason Mississauga Eagles B defeated Brampton United B to claim their first CSL D2 Championship.

=== Teams ===
Team	City	Stadium	Manager
Brampton City United B	Brampton, Ontario	Victoria Park Stadium	Mike DiMatteo
Brantford Galaxy B	Brantford, Ontario	Steve Brown Sports Complex	Peter Pompoino
Kitchener Waterloo United FC	Waterloo, Ontario	Budd Park	Lazo Džepina
London City B	London, Ontario	Cove Road Stadium	Aldo Caranci
Mississauga Eagles FC B	Mississauga, Ontario	Hershey Centre	Josef Komlodi Alex Szczotka
Niagara United	Niagara Falls, Ontario	Kalar Sports Park	James McGillivray
North York Astros B	Toronto, Ontario	Esther Shiner Stadium	Kerwin Skeete
Kingston Prospect FC	Kingston, Ontario	St. Joan of Arc Turf Field	Jimmy Hamrouni
SC Toronto B	Toronto, Ontario	Lamport Stadium	Patrice Gheisar
Serbian White Eagles B	Toronto, Ontario	Centennial Park Stadium	Niki Budalić
St. Catharines Wolves B	St. Catharines, Ontario	Club Roma Stadium	Clayton Rosario
TFC Academy II	Liberty Village, Toronto	Lamport Stadium	Jim Brennan
Toronto Croatia B	Toronto, Ontario	Centennial Park Stadium	
York Region Shooters B	Vaughan, Ontario	St. Joan of Arc Turf Field	

Location of CSL Second Division teams outside of Toronto for the 2011 CSL season.
Location of CSL Second Division teams in Toronto for the 2011 CSL season.

=== Second Division East Standings ===
Pos	Team	Pld	W	D	L	GF	GA	GD	Pts
1	SC Toronto B	18	14	2	2	64	14	+50	44
2	Brampton City United B	19	13	3	3	39	16	+23	42
3	York Region Shooters B	19	9	4	6	49	34	+15	31
4	TFC Academy II	19	10	0	9	49	30	+19	30
5	Serbian White Eagles B	19	9	2	8	38	46	−8	29
6	North York Astros B	17	7	3	7	30	34	−4	24
7	Kingston Prospect FC	19	3	0	16	19	82	−63	9

Updated to match(es) played on 8 October 2011. Source: http://canadiansoccerleague.com/schedules/res_standings.htm
Rules for classification: 1) points; 2) goal difference; 3) number of goals scored.

=== Second Division West Standings ===
Pos	Team	Pld	W	D	L	GF	GA	GD	Pts
1	Niagara United	18	9	6	3	45	19	+26	33
2	Mississauga Eagles B (O)	18	10	2	6	53	40	+13	32
3	Brantford Galaxy SC B	18	9	1	8	40	38	+2	28
4	Kitchener Waterloo United FC	19	6	7	6	32	34	−2	25
5	London City B	18	6	3	9	35	55	−20	21
6	St. Catharines Wolves B	19	3	2	14	21	47	−26	11
7	Toronto Croatia B	18	1	5	12	11	36	−25	8

Updated to match(es) played on 8 October 2011. Source: http://canadiansoccerleague.com/schedules/res_standings.htm
Rules for classification: 1) points; 2) goal difference; 3) number of goals scored.
(O) Play-off winners

=== Final ===
22 October 2011	Brampton City Utd B	1–1 (a.e.t.) (3–5 p)	Mississauga Eagles FC B	Vaughan, Ontario
3:00	Ardit Xhameni 108'	(Report)	Joey Melo 104'	Stadium: St. Joan of Arc Turf Field; Referee: Benjamin Jacobs (Ontario)

=== Top Goal Scorers ===
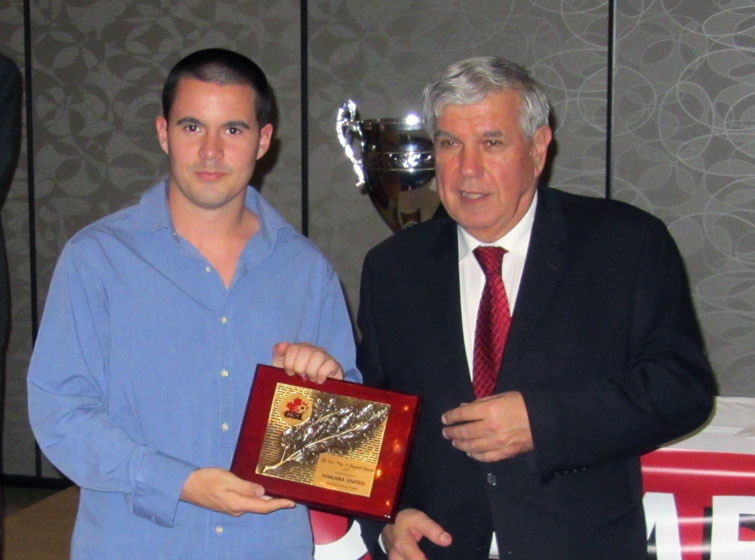
CSL League Administrator Pino Jazbec (right) presenting the CSL Fair Play and Respect to Derek Paterson (left) of Niagara United

Rank	Player	Club	Goals
1	(Canada) Jorgo Nika	SC Toronto B	16
2	(Canada) Derek Paterson	Niagara United	14
3	(Philippines) Terence Linatoc	SC Toronto B	10
4	(Canada) Alex DeMatos	North York Astros B	10
5	(Canada) Brendan Woodfull	TFC Academy B	10
6	(Canada) Jeremy Caranci	London City B	9
7	(Canada) Donavan Wilson	Brampton City United B	9
8	(Canada) Jordan Hamilton	TFC Academy B	9
9	Omar Nakeeb	Mississauga Eagles FC B	8
10	Jonathan Singh	Brampton City United B	7

Updated: 23 October 2016
Source: https://web.archive.org/web/20111114235010/http://canadiansoccerleague.com/

=== Individual awards ===
Award	Player (Club)
CSL Most Valuable Player	Jorgo Nika (SC Toronto B)
CSL Golden Boot	Jorgo Nika (SC Toronto B)
CSL Goalkeeper of the Year Award	Ryan Pumier (KW United FC)
CSL Defender of the Year Award	Oliver Spring (SC Toronto B)
CSL Rookie of the Year Award	Jeremy Caranci (London City B)
CSL Coach of the Year Award	James McGillivray (Niagara United)

== International Friendlies ==
Toronto Croatia participated in the 2nd Croatian World Club Championship in order to defend their title. They successfully claimed their second championship after defeating Canberra Croatia.

28 June 2011	Niagara United (Canada)	1–4	(England) Bedlington Terriers F.C.	Niagara Falls, Ontario
18:30		news		Stadium: Kalar Sports Park

26 June 2011 Croatian World Club Championship	Toronto Croatia (Canada)	4–1	(Switzerland) NK Croatia Zurich
		news

29 June 2011 Croatian World Club Championship	Toronto Croatia (Canada)	3–0	(Austria) Dinamo Ottakring
		news

Croatian World Club Championship	Toronto Croatia (Canada)	2–0	(Germany) Croatia Berlin
		news

2 July 2011 Final Croatian World Club Championship	Toronto Croatia (Canada)	5–0	(Australia) Canberra Croatia	Split, Croatia
		news
