= Josip Keran =

Croatian footballer

- Keran in 2011

Personal information
- Date of birth: 25 March 1985 (age 41)
- Place of birth: Split, SR Croatia, SFR Yugoslavia
- Position: Defender

Youth career
- NK Split

Senior career*
Years	Team	Apps	(Gls)
2008–2011	Dugopolje		
2011–2015	Toronto Croatia		
2014	RWB Adria		
2016	Hamilton City		
2017	SC Waterloo Region		
2017–2018	Toronto Croatia (indoor)		
2018–2019	Mississauga MetroStars (indoor)	18	(6)
2019	CSC Mississauga		
- * Club domestic league appearances and goals

Josip Keran (born March 25, 1985) is a former Croatian footballer who played as a defender.

== Career ==
=== Croatia ===
Keran began playing at the youth level with NK Split. In 2008, he played in the 3. HNL with Dugopolje. He would re-sign with the club the following season. He helped the club achieve promotion to the 2. HNL by winning the league title. He resumed playing with Dugopolje in the second tier for the 2010–11 season. In his final season in the Croatian circuit, he appeared in 2 matches.

=== Toronto Croatia ===
In 2011, he played abroad in the Canadian Soccer League with Toronto Croatia. In his debut season with Toronto, he assisted the club in securing a postseason berth by finishing as runner-up in the First Division. Throughout the postseason, Keran assisted the Croats in claiming the CSL Championship after defeating Capital City F.C.. The next season saw Croatia claim further silverware by clinching the First Division title. In the playoffs, the Croats successfully defended their championship title by defeating the Montreal Impact Academy.

He re-signed with Toronto for the 2013 season. His third season with Croatia witnessed the club securing another playoff berth by finishing third in the top division. However, their quest to successfully defend their championship title was thwarted after losing in a penalty shootout to SC Waterloo Region in the semifinal round. The 2014 season marked his fourth consecutive season with the organization. Croatia produced notable results throughout the campaign as it produced an eight-game undefeated streak and finished as runner-up in the division. He also made his third championship final appearance, where Toronto faced the divisional champions, York Region Shooters, but was defeated in a penalty shootout. For his contributions throughout the season, he was named the league's defender of the year.

The Croats re-signed the defender for the 2015 season and was given the team captaincy. Once more, Toronto remained competitive throughout the division as it finished as runner-up and accumulated the largest number of goals scored. Keran significantly contributed to the club's scoring record as he finished the campaign with 10 goals. In the second round of the playoffs, he recorded a goal that assisted the club in advancing to the championship final for the second consecutive year. He participated in the championship final, where Toronto successfully defeated Waterloo giving Keran his third playoff title. After the conclusion of the season, he was named the league's MVP.

Throughout his tenure with Croatia, he played twice in the international Croatian World Club Championship, both in the 2015 and 2019 editions.

=== Later career ===
In May 2014, he played in the 2014 U.S. Open Cup with Chicago-based RWB Adria. He played in the opening round of the national tournament, where Adria defeated Detroit City in a penalty shootout. Adria would ultimately reach the third round of the tournament, where Keran played against the Pittsburgh Riverhounds of the USL PRO. After a close match, Adria was eliminated after a 3–2 defeat.

For the 2016 CSL season, he signed with expansion franchise Hamilton City. After a season with Hamilton, he signed with league rivals SC Waterloo Region in 2017 where he appeared in the opening match of the playoffs against the Serbian White Eagles. His final run in the CSL was in the 2019 season when he played with CSC Mississauga.

=== Indoor soccer ===
He played at the indoor level in the winter of 2017–18 in the Mississauga-centered Arena Premier League with Croatia AC. In their debut season, the Croats managed to win the championship title.

When the Major Arena Soccer League expanded into Ontario in 2018 and granted a franchise to expansion side Mississauga MetroStars which resulted in Keran signing with the club for the 2018–19 season. He made his debut for the MetroStars on December 1, 2018, against Baltimore Blast. The following week he assisted Mississauga in securing their first victory at home against Florida Tropics SC. He recorded his first goal for the club on December 23, 2018, against Orlando SeaWolves. After a month's absence since February 2019, he returned on March 27, 2019, against Baltimore. In total, he would appear in 18 matches and record 6 goals.

== Honours ==
NK Dugopolje

- 3. HNL South: 2009–10

Toronto Croatia

- CSL Championship: 2011, 2012, 2015
- Canadian Soccer League First Division: 2012

Individual

- CSL MVP: 2015
