= 2009 Canadian Soccer League season =

Canadian Soccer League
- Season: 2009
- Champions: Trois-Rivières Attak
- Regular Season title: Serbian White Eagles (International Division); Trois-Rivières Attak (National Division)
- Matches: 90
- Goals: 301 (3.34 per match)
- Top goalscorer: Reda Agourram 13
- Best goalkeeper: Dan Pelc
- Biggest home win: Serbian White Eagles 7-0 London City (31-Jul-2009)
- Biggest away win: North York Astros 0-8 TFC Academy (19-Sep-2009)
- Highest scoring: Brampton Lions 3-6 Serbian White Eagles (24-Jul-2009); London City 6-3 TFC Academy(14-Aug-2009) (9 goals)

The 2009 Canadian Soccer League season was the 12th since its establishment where a total of 17 teams from Ontario and Quebec took part in the league. The season began on May 15, 2009, and ended on October 24 where for the second straight season the Serbian White Eagles faced Trois-Rivières Attak at the CSL Championship. The Attak denied Serbia their championship title by defeating them 3-2 in a penalty shootout. The victory marked the organizations first championship title, and the return of the championship to Quebec since the 1978 season when Montreal Castors competed in the National Soccer League. Throughout the regular season both Serbia, and Trois-Rivieres won their respective divisions.

The season marked a historic year for the league as it became the first league in 16 years to receive conditional membership in the Canadian Soccer Association. Allowing the CSL to create an effective player developmental system in order to provide the missing link between the top provincial amateur level to the MLS/USL. The league received more coverage with Rogers TV committing to broadcasting a full 23-game schedule every Saturday night through to the finals. While the Reserve Division expanded to include 7 teams with TFC Academy II winning their first piece of silverware.

== Changes from 2008 season ==
- League extends playoffs to two games series and reduces regular-season schedule from 22 to 18 and a balanced schedule.
- Top 8 teams qualify for playoffs, without any seeding for division winners.
- CSL receives conditional membership in the Canadian Soccer Association (first league to achieve this in 16 years).
- Rogers TV commits to broadcasting a full 23-game schedule every Saturday night through to the finals.
- Inaria comes on board as official ball, and referee apparel sponsor.
- Windsor Border Stars franchise revoked.

== Teams ==
Team	City	Stadium	Manager
Brampton Lions	Brampton, Ontario (Bramalea)	Victoria Park Stadium	Armando Costa
Italia Shooters	Vaughan, Ontario (Maple)	St. Joan Of Arc Turf Field	Roberto Pugliese
London City	London, Ontario (Westmount)	Cove Road Stadium	Andrew Loague
North York Astros	Toronto, Ontario (North York)	Esther Shiner Stadium	Vladimir Klinovsky
Portugal FC	Toronto, Ontario (Liberty Village)	Lamport Stadium	Danny Amaral
Serbian White Eagles	Toronto, Ontario (Etobicoke)	Centennial Park Stadium	Rafael Carbajal; Duško Prijić
St. Catharines Wolves	St. Catharines, Ontario (Vansickle)	Club Roma Stadium	James McGillivray
TFC Academy	Toronto, Ontario (Liberty Village)	Lamport Stadium	Jason Bent
Toronto Croatia	Toronto, Ontario (Etobicoke)	Centennial Park Stadium	Velimir Crljen
Trois-Rivières Attak	Trois-Rivières, Quebec	Stade de l'UQTR	Philippe Eullaffroy

=== Coaching changes ===
Team	Outgoing coach	Manner of departure	Date of vacancy	Position in table	Incoming coach	Date of appointment
North York Astros	Uğur Çimen	Replaced	June 20, 2009	6th in June	Vladimir Klinovsky	June 29, 2009
London City	Sean Gauss	Resigned	June 26, 2009	5th in June	Andrew Loague	June 26, 2009

Location of CSL teams outside of Toronto for the 2009 CSL season.
National Division International Division
Location of CSL teams in Toronto for the 2009 CSL season.
National Division International Division

== Results table ==
All Stats Current as of games played Sep 20, 2009.

Home \ Away	BMP	ITS	LON	NYA	POR	SER	STC	TFCA	TOR	TRA
Brampton Lions		0–1	3–0	1–1	1–1	3–6	3–0	2–2	0–1	3–1
Italia Shooters	3–1		2–1	2–1	1–1	1–5	3–4	1–0	2–3	0–3
London City	1–5	0–5		1–4	1–5	1–1	0–1	6–3	0–0	0–2
North York Astros	3–5	1–4	3–2		1–2	0–2	3–0	0–8	1–4	3–2
Portugal FC	3–2	2–2	1–0	0–4		2–2	0–0	1–2	2–2	0–0
Serbian White Eagles	1–3	0–0	7–0	1–0	2–0		3–1	5–2	2–1	2–1
St. Catharines Wolves	1–0	1–1	0–0	2–0	2–1	1–0		1–1	0–0	2–3
TFC Academy	1–3	3–2	7–1	2–1	2–2	0–3	1–1		1–1	2–1
Toronto Croatia	4–0	2–1	2–0	0–0	0–1	1–0	4–1	1–0		0–0
Trois-Rivières Attak	2–1	1–0	6–0	5–0	3–1	2–0	3–0	1–0	4–1	

Source: Canadian Soccer League
Legend: Blue = home team win; Yellow = draw; Red = away team win.

== Standings ==
=== International Division ===
Pos	Team	Pld	W	D	L	GF	GA	GD	Pts	Qualification
1	Serbian White Eagles (A, C)	18	11	3	4	43	19	+24	36	Qualification for Playoffs
2	Toronto Croatia (A)	18	10	5	3	30	15	+15	35	Qualification for Playoffs
3	Italia Shooters (A)	18	7	4	7	31	29	+2	25	Qualification for Playoffs
4	Portugal FC (A)	18	5	8	5	25	27	−2	23	Qualification for Playoffs

Updated to match(es) played on September 21, 2009. Source: rocketrobinsoccerintoronto.com
Rules for classification: 1) points; 2) goal difference; 3) number of goals scored.
(A) Advance to a further round; (C) Champions

=== National Division ===
Pos	Team	Pld	W	D	L	GF	GA	GD	Pts	Qualification
1	Trois-Rivieres Attak (A, C, O)	18	12	2	4	40	16	+24	38	Qualification for Playoffs
2	St. Catharines Wolves (A)	18	6	7	5	20	25	−5	25	Qualification for Playoffs
3	Brampton Lions (A)	18	7	3	8	36	32	+4	24	Qualification for Playoffs
4	TFC Academy (A)	18	6	5	7	37	33	+4	23	Qualification for Playoffs
5	North York Astros	18	4	3	11	25	45	−20	15	
6	London City	18	1	2	15	14	60	−46	5	

Updated to match(es) played on September 21, 2009. Source: rocketrobinsoccerintoronto.com
Rules for classification: 1) points; 2) goal difference; 3) number of goals scored.
(A) Advance to a further round; (C) Champions; (O) Play-off winners

== Playoffs ==
In 2009, both the quarterfinals and semifinals will be two game series. The winner of the series will be the team with the most points after two games. Should they be tied after the second game, the 2nd game will go into overtime, and if necessary, penalty kicks.

In both the quarter- and semifinals, the team who finished higher in the standings determines which of the two games they prefer to host.

The Championship shall be a one-game final on Saturday October 24 at Lamport Stadium in Toronto.

=== Bracket ===
Quarterfinals
1	(Quebec) Trois-Rivières Attak	3	1
8	(Ontario) Portugal FC	0	0
4	(Ontario) Italia Shooters	5	2
5	(Ontario) St. Catharines Wolves	0	1
3	(Ontario) Toronto Croatia	3	1
6	(Ontario) Brampton Lions	1	1
2	(Ontario) Serbian White Eagles	1	4
7	(Ontario) TFC Academy	0	1

Semifinals
1	(Quebec) Trois-Rivières Attak	3	1	1
4	(Ontario) Italia Shooters	3	1	0
3	(Ontario) Toronto Croatia	1	7	0
2	(Ontario) Serbian White Eagles	3	1	1

Final
1	(Quebec) Trois-Rivières Attak	0 (3)
2	(Ontario) Serbian White Eagles	0 (2)

=== Quarterfinals ===
September 25, 2009	St. Catharines Wolves	0–5	Italia Shooters	St. Catharines, Ontario
8:00 ET		(Report)	Blake Ordell 3'; Nick Cisternino 55'; Desmond Humphrey 79', 82', 86'	Stadium: Club Roma Stadium; Referee: Justin Tasev (Ontario)

October 4, 2009	Italia Shooters	2–1	St. Catharines Wolves	Vaughan, Ontario
5:00 ET	Geron Duporte 26', 83'	(Report)	Matthew Cain 15'	Stadium: St. Joan Of Arc Turf Field; Attendance: 100; Referee: John Oliva (Ontario)

Italia Shooters won the series on points.

September 26, 2009	Portugal FC	0–3	Trois-Rivières Attak	Toronto, Ontario
8:00 ET		(Report)	James Louis-Jeune 43'; Ouimette 59'; Shady Saleh 87'	Stadium: Brockton Stadium; Attendance: 30; Referee: Geoff Gamble (Ontario)

October 3, 2009	Trois-Rivières Attak	1–0	Portugal FC	Trois-Rivières, Quebec
3:00 ET	Yannik Rome-Gosselin 27'	(Report)		Stadium: Stade de l'UQTR; Referee: Jonathan Lavergme (Quebec)

Trois-Rivières won the series on points.

September 27, 2009	Serbian White Eagles	1–0	TFC Academy	Toronto, Ontario
5:00 ET	Viciknez 40'	(Report)		Stadium: Centennial Park Stadium; Attendance: 400; Referee: Gianni Facchini (Ontario)

October 3, 2009	TFC Academy	1–4	Serbian White Eagles	Toronto, Ontario
3:30 ET	Matheson 25'	(Report)	Johnathan Hurtis 26'; Viciknez 46', 62'; Tismenar 74'	Stadium: Centennial Park Stadium; Attendance: 150; Referee: David Barrie (Ontario)

Serbian White Eagles won the series on points.

September 27, 2009	Toronto Croatia	3–0	Brampton Lions	Toronto, Ontario
8:15 ET	Fitzwilliams 19'; Tihomir Maletic 48'; Jonathan Bustamante 64'	(Report)		Stadium: Centennial Park Stadium; Attendance: 125; Referee: John Oliva (Ontario)

October 4, 2009	Brampton Lions	1–1	Toronto Croatia	Brampton, Ontario
5:00 ET	Andy Garcia 75'	(Report)	Fitzwilliams 51'	Stadium: Victoria Park Stadium

Toronto Croatia won the series on points.

=== Semifinals ===
October 10, 2009	Italia Shooters	3–3	Trois-Rivières Attak	Vaughan, Ontario
5:00 ET	Johan Carrera 3'; Jason De Thomasis 81'; Pottinger 92'	(Report) (Report)	Guillaume Heroux 4', 25'; Yannik Rome-Gosselin 38'	Stadium: St. Joan Of Arc Turf Field; Referee: Matthew Arduini (Ontario)

October 18, 2009	Trois-Rivieres Attak	1–1	Italia Shooters	Trois-Rivieres, Quebec
3:00 ET	Shady Saleh 64'	(Report)	Aundrae Rollins 62'	Stadium: Stade de l'UQTR

Trois-Rivières won the series on points.

October 11, 2009	Toronto Croatia	1–3	Serbian White Eagles	Toronto, Ontario
4:00 ET	Zupan 56'	(Report)	Johnathan Hurtis 6', 81'; Dimitrov 68'	Stadium: Centennial Park Stadium; Attendance: 500; Referee: Yusri Rudolf (Ontario)

October 17, 2009	Serbian White Eagles	1–7	Toronto Croatia	Toronto, Ontario
4:00 ET	Nikola Sisovic 27'	(Report)	Tihomir Maletic 9', 58', 63', 75', 77'; Fitzwilliams 16'; Medić 35' (o.g.)	Stadium: Centennial Park Stadium; Attendance: 1,230

Serbian White Eagles won the series on points.

=== CSL Championship ===
October 24
5:00 ET

Trois-Rivières Attak	0–0	Serbian White Eagles
	Report
Penalties
Guillaume Heroux (penalty scored); James Louis-Jeune (penalty missed); Dinkota (penalty scored); Chris-Michel Rumuri (penalty missed); Felix Cardin (penalty scored)	3 – 2	Marc Jankovic (penalty scored); Medić (penalty missed); Budalić (penalty missed); Jonathan Hurtis (penalty scored); Dragorad Milićević (penalty missed)

BMO Field, Toronto, Ontario
Attendance: 1100
Referee: Bedik Charchafian (Ontario)

GK	22	(Romania) Andrei Badescu
RB	2	(Canada) Mike Vitulano (c)
CB	24	(Canada) Francesco Augustin
CB	20	(Canada) Karl Ouimette
LB	33	(Canada) Amine Meftouh	(substituted off) 101'
RM	8	(Canada) Pierre-Rudolph Mayard
CM	5	(Canada) Joey Cortese
CM	6	(Canada) Kevin Cossette	(substituted off) 84'
LM	16	(Canada) Felix Cardin
ST	7	(Canada) Yannick Rome-Gosselin	(substituted off) 66'
ST	10	(Canada) Reda Agourram	(substituted off) 116'
Substitutes:
GK	1	(Canada) Simon LaGarde
DF	14	(Canada) James Louis-Jeune
DF	15	(Canada) Maxim Tissot
DF	23	(Canada) Serge Dinkota	(substituted on) 101'
MF	21	(Canada) Chris-Michel Rumuri	(substituted on) 84'
FW	19	(Canada) Shady Saleh	(substituted on) 116'
FW	18	(Canada) Guillaume Heroux	(substituted on) 66'
Manager:
(France) Philippe Eullaffroy

GK	27	(Canada) Dan Pelc
RB	14	(Serbia) Uroš Stamatović
CB	5	(Canada) Marc Jankovic
CB	6	(Serbia) Mirko Medić
LB	3	(Serbia) Dragorad Milićević
RM	8	(France) Jonathan Hurtis
CM	22	(Serbia) Adrian Tismenar
CM	19	(Bulgaria) Kiril Dimitrov	(substituted off) 46'
LM	10	(Canada) Alex Braletic	(substituted off) 62'
FW	17	(Canada) Nikola Budalic
FW	99	(Serbia) Saša Viciknez (c)	(substituted off) 70'
Substitutes:
GK	1	(Serbia) Marko Petrović
MF	20	(Serbia) Milan Janošević
DF	28	(Canada) Goran Vlaski
MF	15	(Serbia) Mihajlo Bačanin	(substituted on) 112'
MF	16	(Canada) Viktor Anastasov	(substituted on) 70'
FW	7	(Canada) Selvin Lammie	(substituted on) 46' (substituted off) 112'
FW	11	(Montenegro) Nikola Šišović	(substituted on) 62'
Manager:
(Serbia) Dušan Prijić

Assistant referees:
Richard Oliveira
Mike Lambert
Fourth official:
Justin Tasev

== Goal scorers ==
2009 Goal Scorers
Rank	Player	Team	Goals
1	Reda Agourram	Trois-Rivières Attak	13
2	Kadian Lecky	Italia Shooters	10
T3	David Guzmán	Brampton Lions	9
T3	Tihomir Maletic	Toronto Croatia	9
T4	Sasa Viciknez	Serbian White Eagles FC	8
T4	Yannick Rome-Gosselin	Trois-Rivières Attak	8
T5	Diego Maradona	North York Astros	7
T5	Allando Matheson	TFC Academy	7
T6	Daniel Nascimento	Brampton Lions	6
T6	Aleks Braletic	Serbian White Eagles FC	6

== CSL Executive Committee and Staff ==
A list of the 2009 CSL Executive Committee.

Position	Name	Nationality
Commissioner:	Cary Kaplan	(Canada) Canadian
Executive Director:	Stan Adamson	(England) English
Director of Discipline:	Clifford Dell	(Canada) Canadian
Director of Officials:	Tony Camacho	(Portugal) Portuguese
League Coordinator:	Brock Robinson	(Canada) Canadian
Office Manager:	Janet Leonard	(Canada) Canadian

== Individual awards ==
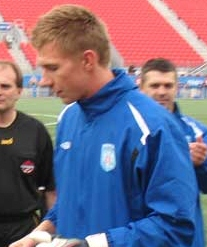
Dan Pelc was given the Goalkeeper of the Year

The annual CSL awards were presented before the CSL Championship final on October 24, 2009. The majority of the awards were taken by the National Division teams. The Serbian White Eagles and Trois-Rivières Attak went home with the most awards. Serbian team captain Sasa Viciknez became the second player in CSL history to be named the MVP twice. After recording one of the best defensive records throughout the season Dan Pelc took the Goalkeeper of the Year. Mirko Medic a former Serbian football veteran also contributed to Serbia's strong defensive performance, and as a result was voted the Defender of the Year.

Reda Agourram of Trois-Rivières received both the Golden Boot and Rookie of the Year honors, which subsequently promoted him to the USL First Division with the Montreal Impact. After leading Trois-Rivières to their first double Philippe Eullaffroy was given the Coach of the Year. Armand Di Fruscio the veteran general manager of St. Catharines Wolves was presented with the Harry Paul Gauss award for his constant commitment and allegiance to the league. TFC Academy were given their first Fair Play and Respect award. The Referee of the Year went to Justin Tasev, a veteran match official who refereed numerous USL and NASL matches.

Award	Player (Club)
CSL Most Valuable Player	Sasa Viciknez (Serbian White Eagles)
CSL Golden Boot	Reda Agourram (Trois-Rivières Attak)
CSL Goalkeeper of the Year Award	Dan Pelc (Serbian White Eagles)
CSL Defender of the Year Award	Mirko Medic (Serbian White Eagles)
CSL Rookie of the Year Award	Reda Agourram (Trois-Rivières Attak)
CSL Coach of the Year Award	Philippe Eullaffroy (Trois-Rivières Attak)
Harry Paul Gauss Award	Armand Di Fruscio (St. Catharines Wolves)
CSL Referee of the Year Award	Justin Tasev
CSL Fair Play Award	TFC Academy

== Reserve Division ==
Canadian Soccer League Reserve Division
- Season: 2009
- Champions: TFC Academy II (Second Division regular season); TFC Academy II (Second Division playoffs)
- Matches: 42
- Goals: 214 (5.1 per match)

The 2009 season saw the division increase to 7 teams with all the matches being played St. Joan Of Arc Turf Field in Vaughan, Ontario. The division was still primary based in the Greater Toronto Area with the senior clubs establishing relationships with the top provincial youth clubs in order to compete in the reserve division to provide a player development structure.

Team	City	Stadium	Manager
Brampton Dixie Lions	Brampton, Ontario	St. Joan Of Arc Turf Field	Mike DiMatteo
Elite Italia FC	Vaughan, Ontario	St. Joan Of Arc Turf Field	
North York Astros II	Toronto, Ontario	St. Joan Of Arc Turf Field	Vladimir Klinovsky
Portugal TE	Toronto, Ontario	St. Joan Of Arc Turf Field	
TFC Academy II	Toronto, Ontario	St. Joan Of Arc Turf Field	Stuart Neely
Unionville Italia FC	Unionville, Ontario	St. Joan Of Arc Turf Field	
Woodbridge Italia FC	Vaughan, Ontario	St. Joan Of Arc Turf Field	Peter Pinizzotto

=== Final standings ===
Pos	Team	Pld	W	D	L	GF	GA	GD	Pts	Qualification
1	TFC Academy II	12	8	2	2	38	13	+25	26	Qualification for Playoffs
2	Elite Italia FC	12	8	1	3	37	19	+18	25	Qualification for Playoffs
3	Brampton Dixie Lions	12	7	1	4	34	18	+16	22	Qualification for Playoffs
4	Woodbridge Italia FC	12	5	2	5	34	32	+2	17	Qualification for Playoffs
5	Unionville Italia FC	12	4	3	5	13	19	−6	15	
6	North York Astros II	12	4	1	7	19	35	−16	13	
7	Portugal TE	12	1	0	11	39	53	−14	3	

Updated to match(es) played on October 11, 2009. Source: https://web.archive.org/web/20091011034441/http://76.74.187.100/~csl1690/CSL-ReserveDivision/
Rules for classification: 1) points; 2) goal difference; 3) number of goals scored.

=== Final ===
October 4, 2009	TFC Academy II	5–1 (a.e.t.)	Woodbridge Italia FC	Vaughan, Ontario
	Keith Makubuya 45'; Matias Naalband 95'; Cristian Rodrigues 97'; Marcus Lees 106'; Andrew Sereduik 119'	(Report)	Mike Holder 75'	Stadium: St. Joan Of Arc Turf Field
