= Serge Dinkota =

Canadian soccer player

Personal information
- Date of birth: 22 January 1991 (age 35)
- Place of birth: Kinshasa, Zaire
- Position: Defender

Youth career
- 2003–2005: Dynamo de Quebec
- 2010–2011: Montreal Impact Academy

College career
Years	Team	Apps	(Gls)
2011–2013	Laval Rouge et Or		

Senior career*
Years	Team	Apps	(Gls)
2007–2008	Royal-Sélect de Beauport		
2008–2009	Trois-Rivières Attak	24	(2)

Managerial career
- 2022–2023: Portland Timbers 2 (assistant)
- 2024–2025: Portland Timbers 2
- 2026–: CF Montréal (assistant)
- * Club domestic league appearances and goals

Serge Dinkota (born January 22, 1991) is a Congolese-born Canadian former soccer player who played as a defender. He is currently the assistant coach for CF Montréal.

== Club career ==
Dinkota played his youth soccer with Cyclone of Ancienne Lorette in 2002. In 2003, he began playing with Dynamo de Quebec for three seasons. Throughout his tenure with Quebec, he was a recipient of the Montreal Impact scholarship. He was also named the Association régionale de soccer de Québec Player of the Year in 2006. In 2007, he played in the Ligue de soccer élite du Québec with Royal-Sélect de Beauport.

In 2008, Dinkota played in the Canadian Soccer League for Trois-Rivières Attak. In his debut season, he helped Trois-Rivières secure their divisional title. In the opening round of the playoffs, the Attak defeated the St. Catharines Wolves. Their opponents in the next round were Portugal FC, whom Trois-Rivières eliminated. In the championship finals, the Serbian White Eagles defeated Trois-Rivières in a penalty shootout.

He re-signed with Trois-Rivières for the 2009 season. In his second season with the club, he helped Trois-Rivières defend their divisional title. In the first round of the playoffs. they defeated the Portuguese. In the following round, the Attak defeated the Italia Shooters to advance to the finals. In the championship game, the club faced the Serbs again, where Dinkota scored in the penalty shootout that helped the team win. Dinkota also represented Quebec in the 2009 Canada Summer Games, where Quebec won the gold medal. In 2010, he joined Montreal Impact's academy in the league's first division, where he played for two seasons.

In 2011, he played college soccer for Laval Rouge et Or. Dinkota was named to the Réseau du sport étudiant du Québec All-Star Second Team in 2011.

== International career ==
In 2010, he was invited to the Canada men's national under-20 soccer team camp organized by Valerio Gazzola.

== Managerial career ==
After retiring from competitive soccer, he began his managerial career in 2014 as the under-13 head coach for the Montreal Impact Academy. He was also named the club's video analyst. After three years at the helm with the under-13 team, he became head coach for the under-15 team in 2018. After five years with Montreal, he joined the Portland Timbers as their under-15 coach. In 2022, he became an assistant coach under Shannon Murray for the Portland Timbers 2 in MLS Next Pro. Two years later, he was elevated to head coach. After the conclusion of the 2025 season, he left Portland.

In 2026, he joined the CF Montréal coaching staff as an assistant coach for Philippe Eullaffroy.

== Honors ==
Trois-Rivières Attak

- CSL Championship: 2009
- Canadian Soccer League National Division: 2008, 2009
- CSL Championship Runners-up: 2008

Québec

- Canada Summer Games Gold Medalists: 2009
