= Marin Vučemilović-Grgić =

Croatian footballer

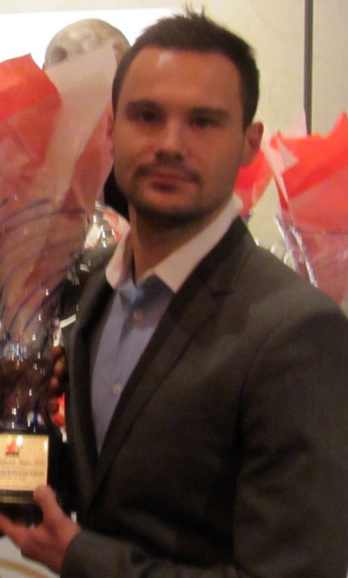
- Vučemilović-Grgić in 2013

Personal information
- Date of birth: 3 February 1987 (age 39)
- Place of birth: Split, SR Croatia, SFR Yugoslavia
- Position: Midfielder

Senior career*
Years	Team	Apps	(Gls)
2006–2010	Solin	74	(10)
2010–2011	Mosor	27	(7)
2011–2012	Toronto Croatia		
2013–2015	London City		
2014	RWB Adria		
2015	Toronto Croatia		
2015–2017	Solin	16	(3)
2017–2018	Mosor	11	(2)
2018–2022	Uskok	108	(18)
2023–2024	Dinara	1	(0)
- * Club domestic league appearances and goals

Marin Vučemilović-Grgić (born 3 February 1987) is a Croatian footballer who plays as a midfielder.

== Career ==
=== Early career ===
Vučemilović-Grgić began competing in the Druga HNL with NK Solin during the 2006–07 season. In his debut season, he appeared in 20 matches and recorded 3 goals. He returned to Solin the following season. He had limited playing time due to an injury. Vučemilović-Grgić was re-signed for the 2008–09. He would re-sign with the club the following season. For the 2010–11 season, he continued playing in the Croatian second tier with NK Mosor.

=== Toronto Croatia ===
In the summer of 2011, he played abroad in the Canadian Soccer League with Toronto Croatia. He recorded his first goal for Croats on 22 July 2011, against Brampton City United. In his debut season with Toronto, he assisted the club in securing a playoff berth by finishing second in the league's first division. He contributed a goal in the preliminary rounds of the postseason against the Mississauga Eagles, which helped the Croats advance to the next round. Toronto won the CSL Championship after defeating Capital FC.

Vučemilović-Grgić re-signed with Toronto for another season in 2012. In his sophomore season, he finished as the club's top goal scorer with 16 goals and was named the league's MVP. Throughout the regular season, he assisted the Croats in securing the First Division title. In the opening round of the playoffs, he scored a goal against Niagara United, which advanced the club to the next round. He made his second consecutive championship final appearance against the Montreal Impact Academy, where he recorded the winning goal, successfully securing Toronto's title.

In the summer of 2015, he returned to Toronto Croatia to play in the Croatian World Club Championship. He scored a goal against Canberra Croatia FC to secure the bronze medal.

=== US Open Cup ===
In May 2014, he played in the 2014 U.S. Open Cup with Chicago-based RWB Adria. He played in the opening round of the national tournament, where Adria defeated Detroit City in a penalty shootout. Adria would ultimately reach the third round of the tournament, where he played against the Pittsburgh Riverhounds of the USL PRO. After a close match, Adria was eliminated after a 3–2 defeat.

=== London City ===
After two seasons with Toronto Croatia, he signed a deal with league rivals London City for the 2013 season. In his debut season with London, he helped the club secure a playoff berth after a 12-year drought. He also finished as the club's top goal scorer with 19 goals. He played in the postseason semi-final against Kingston FC, where he scored a goal; however, London was eliminated from the competition after a 4–2 loss.

He re-signed with London for the 2014 season. He finished the season as the league's top goal scorer with 20 goals and, for the second time in his career, was named the league's MVP. He returned to London for his third season, where he briefly played the 2015 season before returning to Europe.

=== Croatia ===
After a five-year stint abroad, Vučemilović-Grgić returned to his former club NK Solin for the 2015–16 season. The following season, Solin was promoted from the third tier back into the Druga HNL and Vučemilović-Grgić was re-signed for the next season. Throughout his time in the second tier, he appeared in one match against NK Rudeš on 28 August 2016. He also appeared in the 2016–17 Croatian Football Cup against Zagora Unešić.

In 2016, he returned to his former club Mosor, where he played for a season. In 2018, he played for Uskok in the Croatian third tier. He served as the team captain for Uskok in 2019. He re-signed with Uskok in 2021 for his fifth season and continued as the team captain. After five seasons with Uskok, he joined Dinara in the regional 1.ŽNL.

== Honours ==
NK Solin

- Treća HNL South: 2015–16

Toronto Croatia

- CSL Championship: 2011, 2012
- Canadian Soccer League First Division: 2012

Individual

- CSL Golden Boot: 2014
- CSL MVP: 2012, 2014
