= Hayden Fitzwilliams =

Trinidadian footballer

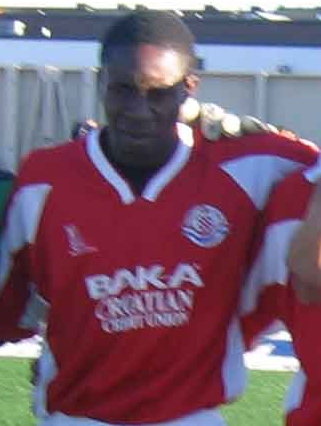
- Fitzwilliams in 2005

Personal information
- Date of birth: 31 January 1975 (age 51)
- Place of birth: Carnbee, Trinidad and Tobago
- Position: Forward

Youth career
- St Clair Coaching School

College career
Years	Team	Apps	(Gls)
2001	New Haven Chargers		

Senior career*
Years	Team	Apps	(Gls)
2002	Mississauga Olympians	7	(6)
2003–2004	Metro Lions	39	(14)
2005–2015	Toronto Croatia	199	(58)
2016	York Region Shooters		

International career
2003–2005	Trinidad and Tobago	5	(0)
- * Club domestic league appearances and goals as of 19 December 2016

Hayden Fitzwilliams (born January 31, 1975) is a Trinidadian former footballer who played as a midfielder and forward and played at the international level with the Trinidad and Tobago national football team.

== Playing career ==
=== Youth career ===
Fitzwilliams began playing football at the youth level with St Clair Coaching School in his native Trinidad. He also played at the college level with the University of New Haven.

=== Early career ===
In 2002, he went abroad to Canada to play in the Canadian Professional Soccer League with the Mississauga Olympians. He scored his first goal for the club on September 18, 2002, against St. Catharines Wolves, which included a hattrick. Within five matches he would score six goals. He helped Mississauga secure a postseason by recording the winning goal against Hamilton Thunder in a 3-2 victory. The Olympians were eliminated in the opening round of the playoffs to the North York Astros.

He resumed his career in the CPSL by signing with league rivals Metro Lions in the Eastern Conference. He recorded his first goal for the Lions on July 11, 2003, in a 1-0 victory over London City. He participated in the 2003 Open Canada Cup where he contributed a goal against St. Catharines in the semifinal and advanced the Lions to the final. The Metro Lions would face London in the tournament final but were defeated in a penalty shootout.

The following season he finished as the club's top goalscorer with nine goals and helped his team reach the postseason by finishing second in the Western Conference. They were eliminated in the opening round of the playoffs to the Vaughan Shooters.

=== Toronto Croatia ===
After the relocation of the Metro Lions to Oakville in 2005 he was picked up by defending champions Toronto Croatia. He finished as the club's top goal scorer and assisted in securing a playoff berth. Toronto was eliminated in the semifinals to Vaughan. He re-signed with the Croats for the 2006 season. Throughout the 2006 season, he was named to the CSL All-Star team that faced Clyde F.C. For the second consecutive season, he finished as the club's top goalscorer.

In 2007, he assisted Toronto in qualifying once more for the postseason. He featured in the CSL Championship final and contributed a goal against the Serbian White Eagles in the first round. The Croats would clinch the championship title in the second match by drawing with the Serbs. He would re-sign with Croatia for the 2008 season. For the third time in his career, he finished as the club's top goal scorer with 11 goals. He would help Toronto secure a postseason berth. He also played with Real Toronto in the 2008 Ontario Cup tournament and recorded a goal against AEK London in the finals which clinched the title for Toronto. Unfortunately, the decision was reversed after Toronto used an ineligible player as a result the title was given to London.

The following season the Croats once more secured a playoff berth with Fitzwilliams scoring goals in the opening round matches against Brampton Lions which advanced Toronto to the next round. In the second round, Croatia was eliminated from the playoffs after losing to the Serbian White Eagles. The 2011 season proved would be a notable one for the midfielder as he provided goals against Mississauga Eagles and York Region Shooters in the opening rounds of the playoffs. As a result, the Croats reached the championship final where Fitzwilliams scored the single winning goal against Capital City. He added more silverware to his portfolio in 2012 by claiming the double with Toronto, by winning the First Division title, and his third CSL Championship.

In 2014, he played his fourth championship final against York Region where they were defeated in a penalty shootout. He re-signed with Croatia in 2015 for his eleventh and final season. He finished his tenure in Toronto with a fourth championship title by defeating SC Waterloo Region. After the conclusion of the 2015 season Toronto Croatia departed from the league and played his final season with York Region Shooters in 2016.

== International career ==
Fitzwilliams made his national team debut on March 26, 2003 in a CONCACAF Gold Cup Qualifier match against Antigua and Barbuda. He would appear in the 2006 World Cup Qualifiers, and in total he appeared in five matches for his country. He played against Dominican Republic on June 13, 2004, in the 2006 FIFA World Cup qualification – CONCACAF second round.

== Achievements ==
Toronto Croatia

- CSL Championship: 2007, 2011, 2012, 2015
- Canadian Soccer League First Division: 2012
- Croatian World Club Championship: 2007, 2011
