= Jonatan Valle =

Jonatan Valle may refer to:

- Jonatan Valle (Spanish footballer) (born 1984), Spanish football midfielder
- Jonatan Valle (Argentine footballer) (born 1993), Argentine football defenders

== See also ==
- Jonathan Vallée (born 1995), Canadian soccer midfielder
