= Victor N'Diaye =

Canadian soccer player

Personal information
- Full name: Victor Omar Antoine N’Diaye
- Date of birth: June 1, 1992 (age 34)
- Place of birth: Quebec City, Quebec, Canada
- Height: 1.71 m (5 ft 7 in)
- Position: Forward

Youth career
- 2011–2014: Montreal Impact

Senior career*
Years	Team	Apps	(Gls)
2014	Montreal Impact U23	12	(1)
2015	FC Montreal	19	(2)
2016	Mont-Royal Outremont	5	(1)
2017–2018	Toulouse Rodéo	13	(3)
- * Club domestic league appearances and goals

Victor Omar Antoine N’Diaye (born June 1, 1992) is a Canadian soccer player who played as a midfielder.

== Club career ==
=== Collegial Scholar League RSEQ ===
N'Diaye played for Cégep Garneau Élans in 2010.

=== Montreal Impact ===
N'Diaye began playing in the Canadian Soccer League's first division in 2011 for the Montreal Impact Academy. In his debut season, he helped Montreal secure a playoff berth. Montreal would be eliminated from the postseason in the first round by Capital City.

The following season, N'Diaye had another run in the inter-provincial circuit. He would assist the club in securing another playoff berth by finishing second in the division. In the first round of the postseason, Montreal would defeat Toronto FC's academy to advance to the next round. Montreal would face the York Region Shooters in the semifinal, and the club would advance to the championship final. He participated in the championship final match where Toronto Croatia defeated Montreal. In his second season in the CSL league, he appeared in 21 matches and scored 5 goals.

In 2013, he played with Montreal Impact's reserve team in the MLS Reserve League. During the 2014 preseason, he was invited to the senior team's winter training camp. He would make his first pre-season appearance in a friendly match against Orlando City SC. Following his appearance against Orlando, he would appear in two additional matches for Montreal during the club's run in the 2014 Walt Disney World Pro Soccer Classic against Fluminense FC U23 and the New York Red Bulls. In the early stages of the 2014 regular season, he was selected for the match against FC Edmonton in the 2014 Canadian Championship but remained on the bench throughout the match.

After his training stint with the senior team, N'Diaye played the remainder of the season with the academy team in the United States-based Premier Development League. Once the PDL season concluded, his efforts were recognized as he was awarded the team's top assists.

=== FC Montreal ===
N'Diaye joined FC Montreal, a USL affiliate club of the Montreal Impact, for the 2015 season. On March 28, 2015, he made his professional debut for the club in a 2–0 defeat to Toronto FC II. He would record his first goal for the club on June 6, 2015, against the New York Red Bulls II. In total, he appeared in 19 matches and scored 2 goals.

=== Mont-Royal Outremont ===
In 2016, N'Diaye joined PLSQ side CS Mont-Royal Outremont and made five appearances for the Montreal club, scoring one goal.

=== Toulouse Rodéo ===
On 30 January 2017, N'Diaye moved abroad, signing with French CFA2 club Toulouse Rodéo. In the final half of the 2016–17 season, N'Diaye made 13 appearances, scoring three goals. He would also play in the 2016–17 Coupe de France against Bergerac Périgord. He left the club in 2018.

== Honors ==
Montreal Impact Academy

- CSL Championship Runners-up: 2012
