= Akil DeFreitas =

Trinidadian footballer (born 1986)

Personal information
- Full name: Akil Rondel Dexter DeFreitas
- Date of birth: 4 November 1986 (age 39)
- Place of birth: Port of Spain, Trinidad and Tobago
- Height: 5 ft 7 in (1.70 m)
- Positions: Winger; striker

Team information
- Current team: Volsungur

College career
| Years | Team | Apps | (Gls) |
| 2006–2008 | North Florida Ospreys | | |
| 2009–2010 | NC State Wolfpack | | |

Senior career*
| Years | Team | Apps | (Gls) |
| 2007–2008 | Central Florida Kraze | 14 | (5) |
| 2011 | Capital City | 23 | (10) |
| 2012 | FF Jaro | 10 | (0) |
| 2013 | FK Dainava | 5 | (0) |
| 2014 | Central FC | 0 | (0) |
| 2014 | Kingston FC | 14 | (6) |
| 2015 | KPV | 14 | (1) |
| 2015 | FC Jazz | 8 | (1) |
| 2016 | Kultsu FC | 21 | (3) |
| 2017 | UMF Sindri | 22 | (8) |
| 2018 | Vestri | 5 | (1) |
| 2019 | Völsungur | 21 | (2) |
| 2021 | Kormákur/Hvöt | 19 | (11) |
| 2022 | Reynir Sandgerði | 11 | (4) |
| 2022 | Kormákur/Hvöt | 10 | (1) |
| 2023– | KF | 30 | (4) |
| 2025– | Kormákur/Hvöt | 1 | (1) |

International career
| 2002 | Trinidad and Tobago U-17 | | |
| 2005 | Trinidad and Tobago U-20 | | |
| 2006 | Trinidad and Tobago U-21 | | |
| 2006 | Trinidad and Tobago U-23 | | |
- * Club domestic league appearances and goals as of 24 July 2025

Akil Rondel Dexter DeFreitas (born 7 November 1986) is a Trinidadian footballer who plays as a winger or striker for Iceland third division club KF.

== Club career ==
=== Early career ===
DeFreitas graduated from St. Anthony's College in 2006. He then went to the University of North Florida, scoring 7 goals and 3 assists in 17 games, tying for the team lead in goals in 2007. During that season, he was named to the Atlantic Sun Conference All-Freshman Team and the Second Conference All-Star Team, as well as being named conference Freshman of the Year. In 2008, he played 18 games, scoring 6 goals and 2 assists for Florida and was named to the Atlantic Sun Conference All-Star Team. In 2009, he was transferred to North Carolina State University and played in 20 games, scoring 2 goals and being named Atlantic Coast Conference Player of the Week multiple times.

=== Capital City ===
On 12 May 2011, it was announced that DeFreitas had signed to his first professional contract with Canadian Soccer League side Capital City in their inaugural season. Akil quickly became a mainstay on the wing for the Ottawa club, and was an integral part of the club's excellent first season. Over the course of the season, he developed great chemistry with teammate and club scoring leader Sullivan Silva, and contributed 10 goals and 5 assists in 23 games. This stellar performance earned him the CSL Rookie of the Year award. Of particular note was a two-goal performance in a 4–0 drubbing of the Brantford Galaxy.

=== FF Jaro ===
On 10 March 2012, it was announced that DeFreitas had signed with FF Jaro of the Finnish top division.

=== FK Dainava ===
On 15 March 2013, it was announced that DeFreitas had signed with FK Dainava Alytus playing in the Lithuanian top division. After five matches, DeFreitas left the club in August 2013 because of a breach in his contract by the club of unpaid salaries to the player.

== International career ==
DeFreitas has long been involved with the Trinidad and Tobago national youth teams. He was selected on the final squad for the under-17 National team. In addition, he was invited to train with the under-20, under-21 and under-23 teams but unfortunately did not secure a spot on any of the final team rosters. In 2006, he also trained with a large pool of hopeful Trinidadians at the Blackbaud Stadium, who were all vying for a spot on the Trinidad and Tobago senior national team before the 2006 World Cup.

== Honours ==
Individual

- Atlantic Sun Conference All-Freshman Team: 2007
- Atlantic Sun Conference Second All-Star Team: 2007
- Atlantic Sun Conference Freshman of the Year: 2007
- Atlantic Coast Conference All-Star Team: 2008
- Canadian Soccer League Rookie of the Year: 2011
