= Clint Irwin =

American soccer player (born 1989)

Personal information
- Full name: Clinton Robert Irwin
- Date of birth: April 1, 1989 (age 37)
- Place of birth: Charlotte, North Carolina, United States
- Height: 6 ft 3 in (1.91 m)
- Position: Goalkeeper

Youth career
- Charlotte United

College career
Years	Team	Apps	(Gls)
2007–2010	Elon Phoenix	54	(0)

Senior career*
Years	Team	Apps	(Gls)
2008–2009	Carolina Dynamo	8	(0)
2011	Capital City	18	(1)
2012	Charlotte Eagles	3	(0)
2013–2015	Colorado Rapids	89	(0)
2016–2018	Toronto FC	32	(0)
2016	Toronto FC II	2	(0)
2019–2022	Colorado Rapids	16	(0)
2019	→ Colorado Springs Switchbacks (loan)	3	(0)
2022	Colorado Rapids 2	3	(0)
2023–2024	Minnesota United	9	(0)
2024	Minnesota United 2	5	(0)
- * Club domestic league appearances and goals as of October 20, 2024

Clinton Robert Irwin (born April 1, 1989) is an American professional soccer player who plays as a goalkeeper.

== Early life ==
Irwin attended high school at Charlotte Christian School. As a student, he played basketball, where he was a teammate of future NBA player Stephen Curry.

Irwin attended Elon University, where he made 54 appearances for the Elon Phoenix over four seasons.

== Club career ==
=== Early career ===
While attending university, Irwin played two seasons with USL Premier Development Division club Carolina Dynamo.

After his time at Elon, Irwin joined Capital City of the Canadian Soccer League for the 2011 season and was named the team captain. Irwin made 22 appearances for Capital City and scored a goal for the club in a 2–2 draw with Windsor Stars. He would help the Ottawa-based club secure a playoff berth by finishing third in the league's first division. Ottawa defeated Montreal Impact's academy team in the quarterfinal round. In the next round, Ottawa defeated the Serbian White Eagles to advance to the championship final. Ottawa would face Toronto Croatia in the championship final and were defeated by Toronto. After the conclusion of the season, Irwin was nominated for the league's best goalkeeper award.

=== United States ===
Following his stint with Capital City, Irwin joined his hometown club, the Charlotte Eagles in the USL Professional Division. On July 6, 2012, Irwin made his debut in a 2–0 win over the Charleston Battery

In February 2013, Irwin signed with Major League Soccer club Colorado Rapids after a successful trial in preseason. He made his debut for the club on March 16 in 1–1 draw against Real Salt Lake, coming on as a 7th-minute substitute for Matt Pickens.

=== Toronto FC ===
Following the 2015 season, in February 2016, Irwin was traded to Toronto FC in exchange for targeted allocation money, a third-round pick in the 2016 MLS SuperDraft and a conditional first-round pick in the 2017 MLS SuperDraft. After featuring as the club's starting goalkeeper for the first part of the season, Irwin sustained in injury in July, and as a result, he was replaced by his deputy Alex Bono in the starting line-up by manager Greg Vanney; Upon his return to action, Irwin later regained the starting spot for the remainder of the regular season and the Playoffs, as Toronto went on to reach the 2016 MLS Cup Final. In the final, held at BMO Field on December 10, Toronto were defeated by Seattle Sounders FC 5–4 on penalties, following a 0–0 draw after extra time; Irwin was able to stop Álvaro Fernández's spot kick during the shootout, but misses from teammates Michael Bradley and Justin Morrow ultimately proved to be decisive. On December 13, 2016, Irwin was selected by Atlanta United FC in the third round of the 2016 MLS Expansion Draft, but was immediately traded back to Toronto for Mark Bloom and allocation money.

The following season, Irwin suffered a hamstring injury in Toronto FC's home opener, a 0–0 draw against Sporting Kansas City; as a result, Bono was once again promoted to the starting line-up in Irwin's absence, and eventually established himself as the team's outright first-choice shot-stopper by September 2017, due to his performances, even after Irwin's return from injury. In a rematch of the previous season's MLS Cup Final, on December 9, Toronto defeated Seattle 2–0 at home to capture the 2017 MLS Cup and complete an unprecedented treble of the MLS Cup, the Supporters' Shield, and the Canadian Championship.

=== MLS ===
On December 14, 2018, Irwin was traded back to the Colorado Rapids in exchange for a second-round pick in the 2019 MLS SuperDraft. He spent the 2019 season as the backup to former United States international Tim Howard. Irwin's contract with Colorado expired following the 2022 season.

On December 6, 2022, Minnesota United FC announced it had signed Irwin to a two-year contract, beginning in 2023, in support of starting goalkeeper, Dayne St. Clair.

== Career statistics ==
=== Club ===
As of match played October 9, 2022

Appearances and goals by club, season and competition
Club	Season	League			Playoffs		National cup		Continental		Total	
Club	Season	Division	Apps	Goals	Apps	Goals	Apps	Goals	Apps	Goals	Apps	Goals
Carolina Dynamo	2008	Premier Development League	4	0	—		—		—		4	0
Carolina Dynamo	2009	Premier Development League	4	0	—		—		—		4	0
Carolina Dynamo	Total		8	0	0	0	0	0	0	0	8	0
Capital City	2011	Canadian Soccer League	18	1	4 (Note: Appearances in CSL Championship)	0	—		—		22	1
Charlotte Eagles	2012	USL Pro	3	0	—		3	0	—		6	0
Colorado Rapids	2013	Major League Soccer	32	0	1 (Note: Appearances in MLS Cup playoffs)	0	1	0	—		34	0
Colorado Rapids	2014	Major League Soccer	26	0	—		2	0	—		28	0
Colorado Rapids	2015	Major League Soccer	31	0	—		0	0	—		31	0
Colorado Rapids	Total		89	0	1	0	3	0	0	0	93	0
Toronto FC	2016	Major League Soccer	19	0	6	0	3	0	—		28	0
Toronto FC	2017	Major League Soccer	6	0	—		4	0	—		10	0
Toronto FC	2018	Major League Soccer	7	0	—		4	0	0	0	11	0
Toronto FC	Total		32	0	6	0	11	0	0	0	49	0
Toronto FC II (loan)	2016	United Soccer League	2	0	—		—		—		2	0
Colorado Rapids	2019	Major League Soccer	11	0	—		1	0	—		12	0
Colorado Rapids	2020	Major League Soccer	4	0	—		—		—		4	0
Colorado Rapids	2021	Major League Soccer	1	0	—		—		—		1	0
Colorado Rapids	2022	Major League Soccer	0	0	—		1	0	—		1	0
Colorado Rapids	Total		16	0	0	0	2	0	0	0	18	0
Colorado Springs Switchbacks (loan)	2019	USL Championship	3	0	—		—		—		3	0
Career total			171	1	11	0	19	0	0	0	201	1

== Honors ==
Toronto FC

- MLS Cup: 2017
- Supporters' Shield: 2017
- Canadian Championship: 2016, 2017, 2018

Capital City FC

- CSL Championship Runners-up: 2011
