= Tonći Pirija =

Croatian footballer

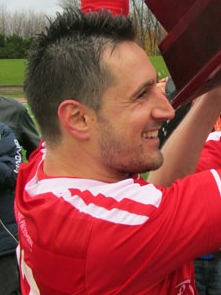
- Pirija in 2012

Personal information
- Full name: Tonći Pirija
- Date of birth: 13 March 1980 (age 46)
- Place of birth: Split, SR Croatia, SFR Yugoslavia
- Position: Midfielder

Senior career*
Years	Team	Apps	(Gls)
1997–2002	Hajduk Split	29	(0)
2000–2001	→ Šibenik (loan)	6	(0)
2002–2003	OFI	1	(0)
2004	Solin		
2004–2005	Zagorje	11	(0)
2005–2006	Međimurje	11	(1)
2006	Tobol Kostanay	3	(0)
2007	Imotski		
2008–2012	Toronto Croatia		
2013	London City		

International career
1995–1996	Croatia U16	6	(0)
1997–1999	Croatia U19	4	(2)
1999–2000	Croatia U20	4	(0)
- * Club domestic league appearances and goals as of 13 March 2017

Tonći Pirija (born March 13, 1980) is a Croatian retired footballer.

Throughout his career Pirija managed to play in his country's highest tier with prominent clubs as HNK Hajduk Split, and HNK Šibenik. He had several stints abroad in the highest tiers in Greece, Slovenia, Kazakhstan, and Canada. His most notable stint abroad was in the Canadian Soccer League with Toronto Croatia with whom he achieved two CSL Championships, and a First Division title.

Pirija also played at the international level with the Croatian U20, U19, and U17 national teams.

== Club career ==
Pirija began his career in 1997 with HNK Hajduk Split in the Croatian First Football League. In 2000, he was loaned to HNK Šibenik, where he appeared in 6 matches. During his time with Hajduk he participated in the 2001–02 UEFA Champions League against RCD Mallorca. He also saw action in the 2001–02 UEFA Cup against Wisła Kraków. After several seasons in the Croatia top flight he went abroad to Greece to play with OFI in the Super League Greece.

After a season in Greece he was transferred to NK Zagorje to the Slovenian PrvaLiga. In 2005, he returned to Croatia to play with NK Međimurje, where he played in 11 matches and recorded 1 goal. He went once more abroad to Asia to play with FC Tobol in the Kazakhstan Premier League. In the 2006 season he was playing with NK Imotski in the Croatian Second Football League.

He went overseas in 2008 to play with Toronto Croatia in the Canadian Soccer League. He made his debut on July 13, 2008 against the Serbian White Eagles. In 2010, he was appointed the team captain, and won the CSL Championship after defeating Capital City F.C. by a score of 1-0. The following season he won the double with Croatia by clinching the First Division title, and defeating the Montreal Impact Academy in the CSL Championship final.

In 2013, he signed with London City, where he helped London clinch a postseason berth. He featured in the quarterfinal match against York Region Shooters, where they advanced to the next round after a 4-2 victory in a penalty shootout. In the next round they were eliminated from the competition after a 4-2 defeat to Kingston FC.

== International career ==
Pirija played with the Croatia national under-17 football team, and was selected for the 1996 UEFA European Under-16 Championship. He later played with the Croatia national under-19 football team, where he appeared in four matches, and recorded one goal. He made his debut for the Croatia national under-20 football team on September 28, 1999 against Slovenia. In total he made four appearances for the Croatia U-20 team.

== Honours ==
=== Toronto Croatia ===
- CSL Championship (2): 2011, 2012
- Canadian Soccer League First Division (1): 2012
