= Blönduósvöllur =

Sports venue in Húsavík, Iceland

(Iceland) Blönduósvöllur
- Interactive map of (Iceland) Blönduósvöllur
- Location: Blönduós, Iceland
- Coordinates: 65.6621844°N 20.2867887°W
- Capacity: 1,500 (100 seated)

Tenant
- Kormákur/Hvöt

Blönduósvöllur (lit. 'Blönduós Field' or more precisely 'Blönduós Stadium') is a multi-use stadium in Blönduós, Iceland. It is currently used mostly for football matches and is the home stadium of third-tier Kormákur/Hvöt. Its capacity is around 1,500.
