= Marko Zelenika =

Croatian footballer

Personal information
- Date of birth: 24 April 1987 (age 39)
- Place of birth: Požega, SR Croatia, SFR Yugoslavia
- Height: 1.84 m (6 ft 0 in)
- Position: Midfielder

Senior career*
Years	Team	Apps	(Gls)
2005–2006	Slavonija Požega		
2005–2007	Kamen Ingrad	47	(1)
2007–2009	Široki Brijeg	11	(0)
2009–2011	Suhopolje		
2011–2014	Imotski	41	(4)
2011–2012	→ Rudeš (loan)	9	(0)
2013–2014	Zmaj Blato		
2014–2015	Oriolik		
2015	Pajde Möhlin		
2016–2018	SG HWWE Niederroßbach		
2018–2019	Hamilton City		
2019–2021	TuS Montabaur	2	(0)
2021	Posavina Frankfurt	13	(3)

International career
2006	Croatia U19	4	(0)
2006	Croatia U20	1	(0)
- * Club domestic league appearances and goals

Marko Zelenika (born April 24, 1987) is a Croatian former footballer who played as a midfielder.

== Club career ==
=== Early career ===
Zelenika began playing in the Croatian Second Football League with Slavonija Požega for the 2005-06 season. He played in the Croatian First Football League during the 2005/06 season with Kamen Ingrad. During his time with Kamen Ingrad, he had an unsuccessful trial session with Swedish-side Umeå FC in the summer of 2007.

=== Bosnia ===
In 2007, he played abroad in the Premier League of Bosnia and Herzegovina with Široki Brijeg. During his tenure with Široki Brijeg, he featured in the 2007–08 UEFA Cup against Koper and Hapoel Tel Aviv. He made his second continental appearance in the 2008–09 UEFA Cup against Partizani Tirana, and Beşiktaş J.K.

=== Croatia ===
In 2009, he returned to the Croatian circuit to play with HNK Suhopolje. In 2011, he returned to the Croatian second division with Imotski and had a loan spell with NK Rudeš. He later played in the Treća HNL with BŠK Zmaj, and NK Oriolik.

=== Europe ===
In 2015, he had another run abroad in the regional Swiss circuit with NK Pajde Möhlin. Zelenika would feature in the 2015 Basel Cup final against FC Pratteln, where he contributed a goal. He also participated in the 2015 Croatian World Club Championship, where he was named best player. Pajde Möhlin would end up defeating Vojvodina Croats in the tournament finals.

Following his stint in Switzerland, he transferred to SG HWW Niederroßbach in the German Bezirksliga in 2016. He would re-sign with Niederroßbach for the 2017 season. The 2018 season would mark his third and final with Niederroßbach.

=== Canada ===
In the summer of 2019, he played in the Canadian Soccer League with Hamilton City. Throughout the 2019 campaign, he helped the club secure a playoff berth by finishing sixth in the league's first division. Hamilton would be eliminated in the first round of the playoffs by Ukraine United in a penalty shootout.

=== Germany ===
After the conclusion of the Canadian season, he played the remainder of the season by returning to the German regional circuit to sign with TuS Montabaur. He re-signed with Montabaur for the following season. After two seasons with Montabaur, he departed in 2021 to play with Posavina Frankfurt.

== International career ==
Zelenika debuted for the Croatia national under-19 football team on February 13, 2006, in a friendly match against Hungary. He represented Croatia in the 2006 Elite Round U-19 Championship against Macedonia and Israel. He also played with the Croatia national under-20 football team, making his debut on September 26, 2006, in a friendly match against Slovenia.
