= Hvöt Blönduós =

Kormákur/Hvöt
- Full name: Ungmennafélagið Hvöt
- Founded: 1969
- Ground: Blönduósvöllur, Blönduós; Hvammstangavöllur, Hvammstangi
- Capacity: 1,000
- Chairman: Sigurður Bjarni Aadnegard
- Manager: Aco Pandurevic
- League: 2. deild karla
- 2025: 2. deild karla, 4th of 12
Home colours	Away colours

Ungmennafélagið Hvöt (Icelandic pronunciation: [ˈuŋkˌmɛnːaˌfjɛːˌlaijɪð ˈkʰvœːt], lit. 'Impulse Youth Club' (Note: Ungmennafélagið is the definite form of Ungmennafélag, meaning "the youth club".)), commonly known as Hvöt or Hvöt Blönduós (Icelandic pronunciation: [ˈkʰvœːt ˈplœntʏˌouːs]), is an Icelandic multi-sport club from the town of Blönduós located in the north of Iceland.

== Football ==
=== Men's football ===
On 12 June 2002, Björn Vignir Björnsson played a senior team game with Hvöt along with three of his sons; Finnur, Óskar and Vignir. It was founded in 1924.

In 2008, comedians and TV-hosts Auðunn Blöndal and Egill Einarsson joined the team.

In November 2007, Kristján Óli Sigurðsson was hired as the head coach of the Hvöt men's team.

=== Kormákur/Hvöt ===
Hvöt and neighbors Ungmennafélagið Kormákur from Hvammstangi had been cooperating for years but in 2012 they decided to field a joint team in the league and called it Kormákur/Hvöt.

== Current squad ==
As of 25 July 2025

Note: Flags indicate national team as defined under FIFA eligibility rules; some limited exceptions apply. Players may hold more than one non-FIFA nationality.

No.	Pos.	Nation	Player
—	MF	ISL	Sigurður Bjarni Aadnegard
—	FW	ISL	Kristinn Bjarni Andrason
—	FW	SWE	Jaheem Burke
—	FW	TRI	Akil DeFreitas
—	DF	SEN	Papa Diounkou
—	DF	ESP	Juan Carlos Dominguez Requena
—	DF	ESP	Acai Elvira
—	MF	ENG	Dominic Furness
—	MF	BRA	Matheus Gaúcho
—	DF	UKR	Hlib Horan
—	FW	ISL	Ingvi Rafn Ingvarsson
—	MF	ISL	Stefán Freyr Jónsson

No.	Pos.	Nation	Player
—	MF	ISL	Indriði Ketilsson
—	FW	MAR	Abdelhadi Khalok
—	MF	GNB	Helistano Manga
—	MF	ISL	Haukur Ingi Ólafsson
—	DF	POR	Sérgio Oulu
—	MF	SRB	Goran Potkozarac
—	FW	CIV	Ismael Sidibé
—	MF	ISL	Arnór Ágúst Sindrason
—	MF	ISL	Jón Gísli Stefánsson
—	MF	ISL	Sigurður Pétur Stefánsson
—	DF	ISL	Marko Zivkovic
—	GK	SWE	Simon Zupancic
