= Valentin Radevich =

Belarusian footballer (born 1989)

Personal information
- Date of birth: 3 February 1989 (age 37)
- Place of birth: Minsk, Belarusian SSR
- Height: 1.71 m (5 ft 7 in)
- Position: Midfielder

Youth career
- 1994–2005: Dinamo Minsk
- 2006–2009: BATE Borisov
- 2010–2013: Montreal Carabins

College career
Years	Team	Apps	(Gls)
2013–2016	McGill Redmen		

Senior career*
Years	Team	Apps	(Gls)
2007–2009	BATE Borisov	8	(0)
2010–2013	Montreal Impact Academy		

International career
2005	Belarus U17	3	(0)
2007–2008	Belarus U19	5	(1)
2009	Belarus U21	2	(0)
- * Club domestic league appearances and goals

Valentin Radevich (born 3 February 1989) is a Belarusian former professional footballer who played as a midfielder.

== Club career ==
Radevich began his career 1994 at the youth team of Dinamo Minsk. He left after nine years at Dinamo Minsk to sign for BATE Borisov in February 2006. He played since the 2007 season in the Belarusian Premier League team and moved in February 2010 on trial to Montreal Impact of USSF D2 Pro League. After a successful trial with Montreal Impact, the club signed him to their youth Academy, the Montreal Impact Academy in the Canadian Soccer League.

== International career ==
Radevich is a former youth international player of Belarus and represented his country on U-17, U-19 and U-21 level.

== Personal life ==
Radevich studies Arts and Science on the Université de Montréal and played for the Montreal Carabins soccer team. He is now completing a bachelor's degree in physical therapy at McGill University.

== Honours ==
BATE Borisov

- Belarusian Premier League : 2007, 2008
