= Portland Timbers 2 =

Soccer team in the United States

- Full name: Portland Timbers 2
- Nickname: T2
- Founded: October 14, 2014 (11 years ago)
- Stadium: Providence Park; Portland, Oregon
- Capacity: 25,218
- Coordinates: 45°31′17″N 122°41′30″W
- Owner(s): Portland Timbers (Peregrine Sports)
- President: Merritt Paulson
- Head coach: Jack Cassidy
- League: MLS Next Pro
- 2025: 10th, Western Conference; Playoffs: Did not qualify
- Website: www.timbers2.com
Home colors	Away colors

The Portland Timbers 2 is an American professional soccer team based in Portland, Oregon. The team, often referred to as "T2", serves as the reserve squad for the Portland Timbers of Major League Soccer (MLS).

The team was a member of the USL Championship from 2015 to 2019, and was in the second tier of the United States soccer pyramid beginning in 2016. The organization withdrew from the 2021 USL Championship season so it could better transfer players to its parent club during the COVID-19 pandemic. The reserves are now part of MLS reserve league MLS Next Pro.

== History ==
The Timbers announced the formation of their USL Pro team at a press conference on October 14, 2014. Jay Vidovich, long-time Wake Forest head coach and two-time NSCAA National Coach of the Year, was hired as T2's head coach on December 18, 2014. Timbers 2 held an open tryout in February 2015. It was announced on February 19 that there are six players currently signed to Timbers 2. Their home games were played at Merlo Field, a soccer-specific stadium at the University of Portland for their first two seasons. After the 2016 season, the Timbers moved T2 home games to Providence Park, and T2 would play there for the next three seasons. After the 2019 season, the Timbers announced that the ownership group of the Hillsboro Hops, a minor-league baseball team based in the Portland suburb of Hillsboro, Oregon, would take over the business operations of T2, while the Timbers would remain T2 owners with responsibility for the playing staff. As part of this agreement, T2 will move to Hillsboro Stadium for 2020. For the 2023 season, T2 moved back to Providence Park.

In T2's first season, the team finished in 8th place in the Western Conference of the league table with 11 wins, 15 losses, and 2 ties. Kharlton Belmar was named USL Rookie of the Year and selected for the All-League Second Team. Jay Vidovich resigned to become head coach of the University of Pittsburgh. Assistant Coach Andrew Gregor was hired to replace him on January 6, 2016.

T2 in 2016 had finished in ninth place in the Western Conference. Midway towards the end of the season, T2 had attempted to make a comeback to clinch the final spot for the USL playoffs which increased from the top six to eight teams in each conference. Timbers 2 competed against Arizona United in their final game of their season. Although the team had defeated Arizona, it was not enough to secure the final spot for a playoff berth due to Orange County winning in their final game with a better goal difference than T2.

In October 2020, T2 announced it would skip the 2021 USL season, aiming to return in 2022.

=== MLS Next Pro ===
The club announced on December 6, 2021, that it was joining the inaugural 21-team MLS Next Pro season starting in 2022.

== Players and staff ==
=== Roster ===
As of March 25, 2023

No.	Pos.	Nation	Player
34	DF	RSA	Calem Tommy
35	MF	USA	Lucas Fernandez-Kim
37	FW	USA	Noah Santos
39	FW	USA	Colin Griffith
44	DF	ENG	Alex Bamford
46	MF	USA	Adolfo Enriquez
47	FW	USA	Daniel Cervantes
53	DF	ENG	Connor Ferguson
61	DF	DEN	Nicklas Lund
63	MF	USA	Daniel Núñez
66	MF	USA	Cole Cruthers
77	MF	USA	Benjamin Barjolo
90	FW	USA	Max Kissel
91	GK	USA	Sam Joseph
—	MF	USA	Justin McLean

Signed to first team contract with the Portland Timbers.
Portland Timbers academy player.

=== Staff ===
Title	Name
Head coach	(Republic of Ireland) Jack Cassidy
Assistant coach	(El Salvador) Andrés Flores

=== Head coaches ===
Name	Nation	Tenure
Jay Vidovich	USA	December 18, 2014 – December 4, 2015
Andrew Gregor	USA	January 6, 2016 – January 7, 2018
Cameron Knowles	NZL	January 8, 2018 – November 1, 2020
Shannon Murray	USA	February 23, 2022 – May 2, 2024
Serge Dinkota	CAN	May 2, 2024 – October 13, 2025

== Badge and crest ==
T2's logo contains the same axe that is used in their parent organization's logo. The shape and design were previously used by the Portland Timbers USL franchise. The typeface used in the team's logo is the same font used in the 1975 Portland Timbers North American Soccer League kits. The chevrons behind the axe are the same pattern used in the original Timbers mark.

== Stadium ==
- Merlo Field (2015–2016; 2019)
- Providence Park (2017–2019)
- Hillsboro Stadium (2020–2022)
- Providence Park (2023)

== Record ==
=== Year-by-year ===
Year	Division	League	Regular season (W-L-T)	Playoffs	U.S. Open Cup	Avg. attendance
2015	3	USL	11–15–2: Western Conf: 8th	Did not qualify	3R	3,362
2016	3	USL	12–14–4: Western Conf: 9th	Did not qualify	Not eligible (MLS Reserve Team)	2,323
2017	2	USL	3–23–6: Western Conf: 15th	Did not qualify	Not eligible (MLS Reserve Team)	2,524
2018	2	USL	17–13–4: Western Conf: 6th	Conference Quarterfinals	Not eligible (MLS Reserve Team)	2,127
2019	2	USLC	10–16–8: Western Conf: 14th	Did not qualify	Not eligible (MLS Reserve Team)	1,899
2020	2	USLC	3–13–0: Western Conf: 18th	Did not qualify	Not eligible (MLS Reserve Team)	N/A
2021	On Hiatus					
2022	3	MLSNP	2–18–4: Western Conf: 11th	Did not qualify	Not eligible (MLS Reserve Team)	N/A
2023	3	MLSNP	11–16–1: Western Conf: 10th	Did not qualify	Not eligible (MLS Reserve Team)	N/A
