= Joevannie Peart =

Canadian former soccer player (born 1984)

Personal information
- Full name: Joevannie Peart
- Date of birth: May 14, 1984 (age 42)
- Place of birth: Mississauga, Ontario, Canada
- Height: 1.97 m (6 ft 5 1/2 in)
- Position: Forward

College career
| Years | Team | Apps | (Gls) |
| 2003 | Western Nebraska Cougars | | (4) |

Senior career*
| Years | Team | Apps | (Gls) |
| 2002 | Mississauga Olympians | 16 | (3) |
| 2005–2008 | Lombard-Pápa TFC | 18 | (1) |
| 2008 | Bình Dương F.C. | | |
| 2008–2009 | Integrál-DAC | 2 | (0) |
| 2011 | Mississauga Eagles FC | | |
- * Club domestic league appearances and goals as of April 19, 2015

Joevannie Peart (born May 14, 1984) is a Canadian former soccer player who played in the Canadian Professional Soccer League, Nemzeti Bajnokság I, V.League 1, and Nemzeti Bajnokság II.

== Playing career ==
Peart played at the college level in 2003 with Western Nebraska Community College. He later transferred to University of Cincinnati. He played at the professional career in his native city of Mississauga in the Canadian Professional Soccer League with the Mississauga Olympians. In 2005, Peart went abroad to Hungary to sign with Lombard-Pápa TFC in the Nemzeti Bajnokság I, where he played for three years, appearing in 18 matches and recording 1 goal. He went overseas to Vietnam to sign with Bình Dương F.C. in 2008.

During his tenure with Bình Dương he won the Vietnamese National Cup, Vietnamese Super Cup, and the V-League championship. In 2008, he returned to Hungary to sign with Integrál-DAC, and in 2011 he returned to Canada to play with the Mississauga Eagles FC in the Canadian Soccer League.

On August 2, 2018 he was wanted as part of a serious investigation conducted by the Toronto Police Service, as the 7th suspect identified with involvement in numerous illegal firearm and narcotics trafficking offences. On December 11, 2018 he was charged with trafficking of illegal drugs and firearms throughout the Golden Horseshoe in Ontario, Canada.

== Honors ==
=== Bình Dương ===
- V.League 1 Championship (1): 2008
- Vietnamese National Cup (1): 2008
- Vietnamese Super Cup (1): 2008
