= Sérgio Oulu =

Portuguese footballer

Personal information
- Full name: Sérgio Francisco Oulu
- Date of birth: 19 May 1993 (age 33)
- Position: Defender

Team information
- Current team: Kormákur/Hvöt

Senior career*
Years	Team	Apps	(Gls)
2016–2017	Sertanense	21	(0)
2017	Real Queluz	6	(1)
2018	Mafra	6	(0)
2018–2020	Oriental	40	(0)
2020–2021	Águeda	16	(0)
2021	Florø	11	(0)
2023	Þróttur	4	(0)
2024-	Kormákur/Hvöt	29	(1)
- * Club domestic league appearances and goals as of 24 July 2025

Sérgio Francisco Oulu (born 19 May 1993) is a Portuguese footballer who plays for Icelandic club Kormákur/Hvöt, as a defender.

== Football career ==
On 8 September 2017, Oulu made his professional debut with Real in a 2017–18 LigaPro match against Benfica B.
