= 2012 Charlotte Eagles season =

Charlotte Eagles
2013 season
- Owner: Pat Stewart
- Head Coach: Mark Steffens
- Stadium: Dickson Field, Queens University; Charlotte, North Carolina
- USL Pro: TBD
- U.S. Open Cup: TBD
- USL Pro Playoffs: TBD
Home colors	Away colors

== Current roster ==
As of June 18. 2012

No.	Position	Nation	Player
1	GK	USA	Corbin Waller
2	DF	USA	Cheyne Roberts
3	DF	USA	Mark Bloom
4	MF	USA	Judson McKinney
5	MF	USA	Milton Blanco
6	DF	TRI	Sean Bateau
7	FW	USA	Chris Salvaggione
9	FW	TRI	Darryl Roberts
10	MF	COL	Jorge Herrera
11	MF	USA	Luke Williams
12	MF	USA	Juan Guzman
13	DF	USA	Isaac Cowles
14	MF	ZIM	Joseph Kabwe
15	DF	PUR	Scott Jones
15	MF	USA	Cuitlahuac Meza
17	FW	USA	Brad Stisser
18	FW	USA	Ben Page
19	MF	CUB	Miguel Ferrer
20	DF	USA	Devon Grousis
21	MF	TRI	Darren Toby
22	GK	USA	Patrick Mitrovich
24	GK	USA	Eric Reed
25	FW	USA	Nathan Thornton
25	GK	USA	Clinton Irwin
27	FW	BRA	Mauricio Salles
29	MF	USA	Josh Rife (captain)

== USL Pro ==
=== Results summary ===
Overall								Home						Away					
Pld	W	D	L	GF	GA	GD	Pts	W	D	L	GF	GA	GD	W	D	L	GF	GA	GD
24	11	4	9	35	26	+9	37	6	1	4	16	11	+5	5	3	5	19	15	+4

Last updated: August 19, 2012.
Source: uslsoccer.com

Round	1	2	3	4	5	6	7	8	9	10	11	12	13	14	15	16	17	18	19	20	21	22	23	24
Ground	H	H	H	H	A	A	A	A	H	A	A	A	H	H	A	H	H	H	H	A	H	A	A	A
Result	L	D	L	L	L	W	W	L	L	D	L	L	W	W	W	W	W	L	W	L	W	W	D	W

Updated to match(es) played on August 19, 2012. Source: uslsoccer.com
A = Away; H = Home; W = Win; D = Draw; L = Loss
