= Adrian Tismenar =

Serbian footballer

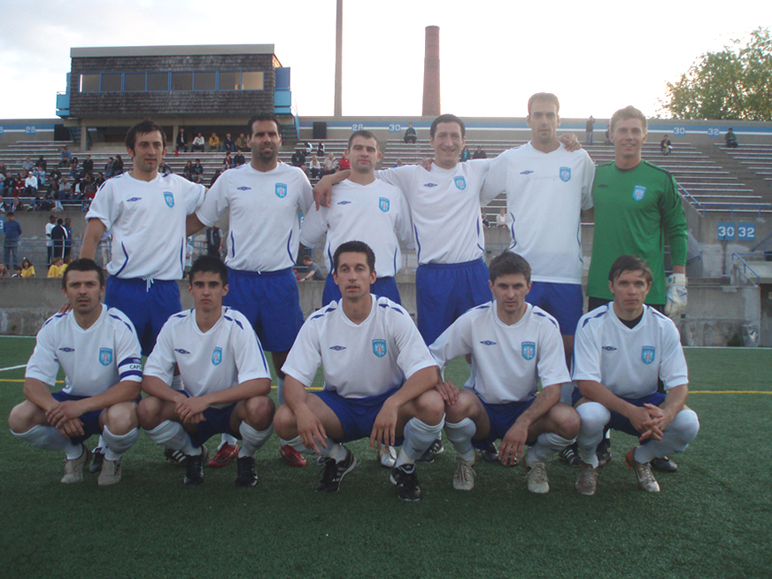
- Tismenar in 2009

Personal information
- Full name: Adrian Tismenar
- Date of birth: December 31, 1981 (age 44)
- Place of birth: Vršac, SFR Yugoslavia
- Position: Midfielder

Senior career*
Years	Team	Apps	(Gls)
2005–2007	Mladi Radnik		
2007	Mornar Bar		
2007–2008	Sevojno	13	(1)
2009–2011	Serbian White Eagles		
2012	Vršac		
2013–2015	Brampton United		
- * Club domestic league appearances and goals

Adrian Tismenar (Serbian Cyrillic: Адриан Тисменар: born December 31, 1981) is a retired Serbian footballer who played in the Serbian First League, Serbian League, Montenegrin First League and the Canadian Soccer League.

== Playing career ==
Tismenar began his career in 2005 with FK Mladi Radnik in the Serbian League East. In 2007, he signed with FK Mornar of the Montenegrin First League. In 2007, he returned to Serbia to play in the Serbian First League with FK Sevojno. In 2009, he went overseas to Canada to sign with the Serbian White Eagles of the Canadian Soccer League. In his debut season he clinched the regular season title for the club. He also featured in the CSL Championship finals match against Trois-Rivières Attak, but lost the match on penalties. In 2012, he returned to Serbia to play with FK Vršac, and the following season he returned to the CSL to sign with Brampton United.
