= Jonathan Vallée =

Canadian soccer player

Personal information
- Date of birth: April 22, 1995 (age 31)
- Place of birth: Gatineau, Quebec, Canada
- Height: 1.77 m (5 ft 10 in)
- Position: Midfielder

Youth career
- 2012–2014: Montreal Impact
- 2015: Ottawa Fury

College career
| Years | Team | Apps | (Gls) |
| 2018–2021 | Laval Rouge et Or | | |

Senior career*
| Years | Team | Apps | (Gls) |
| 2015 | FC Montreal | 4 | (0) |
| 2015 | Ottawa Fury FC Academy | 6 | (0) |
| 2015 | Ottawa Fury | 0 | (0) |
| 2016–2018 | FC Gatineau | 29 | (1) |
| 2023– | Royal-Sélect de Beauport | 17 | (0) |
- * Club domestic league appearances and goals as of September 30, 2023

Jonathan Vallée (born April 22, 1995) is a Canadian soccer player who plays for Royal-Sélect de Beauport in Ligue1 Quebec.

== Playing career ==
Vallée played youth soccer with the Montreal Impact Academy.

In March 2015, he joined USL club FC Montreal, the second team of the Montreal Impact, on a professional contract. In July 2015, he was released by the club.

After being released by FC Montreal, Vallée joined the Ottawa Fury FC Academy in the Première ligue de soccer du Québec. In October 2015, he signed with the Ottawa Fury FC first team in the North American Soccer League.

From 2016 to 2018, he played with FC Gatineau in the Première Ligue de soccer du Québec.

In 2018, he began attending Laval University, where he played for the men's soccer team, until 2021. In 2018 and 2019, he was named an RSEQ Second Team All-Star in indoor soccer and in 2019, he was a Second Team All-Star in outdoor soccer.

In 2018, he played in the Canadian Futsal Championship with Sporting Montréal FC.
