= Alex Szczotka =

Polish footballer, director, and coach

Personal information
- Full name: Aleksander Szczotka
- Place of birth: Poland
- Position: Defender

Senior career*
Years	Team	Apps	(Gls)
1986–1990	Piast Gliwice	8	(0)
1992	Toronto Italia		

Managerial career
- 2012: Mississauga Eagles FC
- * Club domestic league appearances and goals

Alex Szczotka is a former Polish footballer and current Technical Director and head coach for the Erin Mills Soccer Club.

== Playing career ==
Szczotka began his career in his native Poland with Piast Gliwice in the I liga in 1986. In 1992, he signed with Toronto Italia of the Canadian National Soccer League. After retiring from professional soccer he went into coaching and served as the assistant coach for Josef Komlodi for the Mississauga Eagles FC of the Canadian Soccer League in 2011. The following season, he was promoted to head coach for Mississauga, but failed to secure a postseason berth. On January 24, 2013 Erin Mills relieved Komlodi from his position of technical director, and named Szczotka as his successor.
