= Allando Matheson =

Jamaican-Canadian soccer player

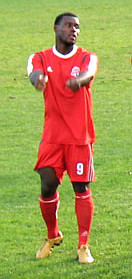
- Matheson in 2010

Personal information
- Date of birth: February 29, 1992 (age 34)
- Place of birth: Kingston, Jamaica
- Position: Forward

Youth career
- North Scarborough SC
- 2008–2010: Toronto FC

College career
Years	Team	Apps	(Gls)
2011–2014	Connecticut Huskies	70	(18)

Senior career*
Years	Team	Apps	(Gls)
2009–2010	TFC Academy		
2010	→ Toronto FC (loan)	0	(0)
2015	FC London	9	(3)
2015–2016	Harbour View F.C.	3	(1)
2016	Master's Futbol	9	(7)
2017–2018	Casey Comets FC	22	(10)
2017–2018	Harbour View F.C.	2	(0)
2018–2019	Casey Comets FC	19	(4)
2019	Malvern City FC	18	(7)
- * Club domestic league appearances and goals

Allando Matheson (born February 29, 1992) is a former Jamaican-Canadian soccer player who played in the forward position.

== Early career ==
Matheson began playing at the youth level with North Scarborough, and eventually in 2008, joined the Toronto FC Academy. He began playing in the Canadian Soccer League's reserve division with the TFC Academy U16 team. In 2009, he was promoted to the top U18 Academy team in the main Canadian Soccer League division, where he finished as the club's top goalscorer with seven goals. He also helped the Toronto senior team secure its first playoff berth. Their playoff run ended in the quarterfinal round after losing a two-game series against the Serbian White Eagles. Matheson would contribute the academy's only goal in the two-game series.

In the summer of 2009, he competed in the 2009 Canada Summer Games and represented Team Ontario, where he scored a goal against Nova Scotia to help win the bronze medal. Before the 2010 regular season began, Matheson played with Toronto's academy side in the under-19 Dallas Cup. After advancing past the group stage, Toronto was eliminated from the tournament in the next round. He continued playing with the senior team for the 2010 CSL season. In his final season in the CSL circuit, he helped Toronto secure its second consecutive playoff berth.

== College career ==
In 2011, he decided to play college soccer with the University of Connecticut, where he played for four seasons. He recorded his first goal for the university on September 16, 2011, against the Boston University Terriers. In his final season in Connecticut, he played alongside future Canadian international Cyle Larin.

== Senior career ==
In 2010, he was selected by Toronto FC to feature in the 2010 Canadian Championship against the Vancouver Whitecaps. He started in the match against Vancouver on June 2, 2019, where Toronto drew the match to claim the Canadian Championship.

After four seasons playing college soccer, he signed with FC London in the USL Premier Development League. He missed a portion of the season due to an injury. Following his stint in London, he played abroad in the Jamaican National Premier League with Harbour View F.C.

After a season abroad, he returned home to play in League1 Ontario with Master's Futbol.

In 2017, he played abroad for the second time in the Australian Victorian State League Division 1 with Casey Comets FC. In his debut season in the Australian circuit, he played in 22 matches and scored 10 goals. In his final season with the Comets, he played in 19 matches and scored 4 goals. Matheson played with league rivals Malvern City FC in 2019.

== International career ==
In 2009, he was selected by Canada men's national under-17 soccer team head coach Sean Fleming for a friendly tournament in Mexico. Matheson was nominated for the 2008 U17 Canada Soccer Player of the Year.

== Career statistics ==
Club	Season	League		MLS Cup		Domestic Cup		CONCACAF		Total	
Club	Season	Apps	Goals	Apps	Goals	Apps	Goals	Apps	Goals	Apps	Goals
Toronto FC	2010	0	0	0	0	1	0	0	0	1	0
Toronto FC	Total	0	0	0	0	1	0	0	0	1	0
Career total		0	0	0	0	1	0	0	0	1	0

== Honours ==
Toronto

- Canadian Championship: 2010
