= Philippe Eullaffroy =

French footballer (born 1964)

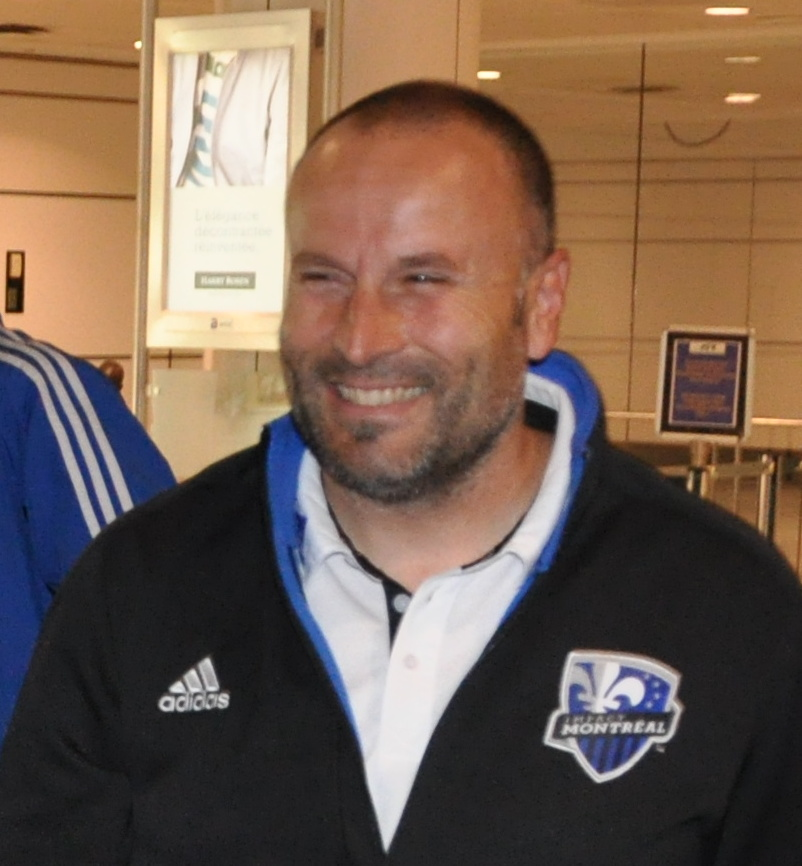
- Eullaffroy with the Montreal Impact in 2013

Personal information
- Date of birth: January 9, 1964 (age 62)
- Place of birth: Troyes, France
- Height: 5 ft 9 in (1.75 m)
- Position: Forward

Senior career*
Years	Team	Apps	(Gls)
1984–1991	Troyes	145	(35)

Managerial career
- 1998–2004: Stade de Reims
- 2005–2008: McGill Redmen
- 2009–2010: Trois-Rivières Attak
- 2010–2020: Montreal Impact Academy
- 2013–2014: Montreal Impact (assistant coach)
- 2015–2016: FC Montreal
- 2021–2022: Soccer Québec
- 2023–2025: Dakar Sacré-Cœur (technical director)
- 2025–2026: Olympique Lyonnais (head of methodology/performance)
- 2026–: CF Montréal (assistant coach)
- 2026–: CF Montréal (caretaker)
- * Club domestic league appearances and goals

Philippe Eullaffroy (born January 9, 1964) is a French football manager and former footballer who played as a forward. He is currently the caretaker of Major League Soccer side CF Montréal. He founded the CF Montréal Academy and spent 11 seasons in Montréal in multiple roles, including Head Coach and Academy Director. After two seasons at AS Dakar Sacré-Cœur as a Technical Director, he served as head of methodology and performance at Olympique Lyonnais before returning to CF Montréal (formerly Montreal Impact) as an assistant coach.

== Club career ==
Eullaffroy played professional football with Troyes AC from 1982 to 1991. He was selected to the team of the century by the fans and set a record after scoring the fastest goal in club history.

== Managerial career ==
=== College level ===
Eullaffroy began his managerial career in his native France with the Stade de Reims and Troyes AC youth academies. In 2005, he moved abroad to Canada, where he began to manage the McGill Redmen, coaching the team for three years. During his tenure with McGill, he was named the Coach of the Year for all three seasons.

=== Canadian Soccer League ===
In 2009, he was appointed head coach for Trois-Rivières Attak in the Canadian Soccer League. In his first season with the Attak, he led the club to its second National Division title. In the postseason, the club reached the CSL Championship finals, where the Attak won in penalties against International Division champions the Serbian White Eagles. For his achievements with the Attak in his debut season, he was awarded the league's Coach of the Year award. The following year, Trois-Rivières ceased operations due to the end of cooperation as the farm team for the Montreal Impact, in which the ownership waived their players' rights and opened their territory for the benefit of the Montreal Impact Academy.

On March 23, 2010, Eullaffroy was appointed the head coach for the Montreal Impact Academy. He led Montreal to the championship final in the 2012 season but was defeated by divisional champions Toronto Croatia.

=== Montreal Impact ===
In 2013, he served as the Montreal Impact assistant coach under head coach Marco Schällibaum in the Major League Soccer. In 2014, he was named the academy director for the Montreal Impact academy. On November 17, 2014, Eullaffroy was hired as the head coach for the expansion franchise FC Montreal, which began play in 2015 in the USL Pro.

On July 3, 2020, Montreal dismissed him from his post as the academy's director.

=== Quebec soccer ===
In 2022, he ventured into the administrative side of soccer as the performance manager for the Quebec Soccer Federation.

=== Africa ===
After several years in the Canadian province of Quebec, he landed an administrative role with the Senegalese side Dakar Sacré-Cœur as technical director.

=== Olympique Lyonnais ===
In 2025, Eullaffroy returned to his native France and was named head of methodology and performance at Olympique Lyonnais, overseeing the U13-19 youth levels.

=== CF Montreal ===
On January 7, 2026, Eullaffroy was named an assistant coach for CF Montreal (formerly the Montreal Impact), marking his return to the club after nearly six years. On April 12, 2026, he was named interim head coach after the firing of Marco Donadel.

== Managerial statistics ==
Team	Nat	From	To	Record				
Team	Nat	From	To	G	W	L	D	Win %
Trois-Rivières Attak	Canada	2009	2010	18	12	4	2	66.66
Montreal Impact Academy	Canada	2010	2014	86	41	23	22	47.67
FC Montreal	Canada	2015	2016	58	15	37	6	25.86

== Honours ==
=== Managerial ===
Trois-Rivières Attak

- CSL Championship: 2009
- Canadian Soccer League National Division: 2009

Montreal Impact Academy

- CSL Championship runner-up: 2012

Individual

- Canadian Soccer League Coach of the Year: 2009
