= Sullivan Silva =

Brazilian footballer

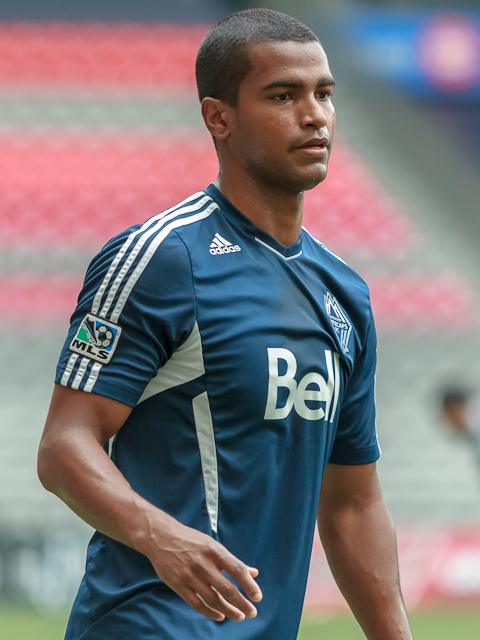
- Silva in 2012

Personal information
- Full name: Sullivan Oliveira Silva
- Date of birth: 14 July 1988 (age 38)
- Place of birth: Goiânia, Brazil
- Height: 6 ft 1 in (1.85 m)
- Position: Forward

Team information
- Current team: Thunder Bay Chill
- Number: 7

College career
Years	Team	Apps	(Gls)
2006–2008	Oklahoma Baptist Bison		

Senior career*
Years	Team	Apps	(Gls)
2009–2010	Austin Aztex	39	(4)
2011	Capital City	28	(15)
2012–	Thunder Bay Chill	119	(56)
- * Club domestic league appearances and goals as of 13 February 2022

Sullivan Oliveira Silva (born 14 July 1988) is a Brazilian footballer currently playing for Thunder Bay Chill in USL League Two.

== Career ==
=== Youth and amateur ===
After attending the Gonealves Ledo school in his native Brazil, Silva came to the United States in 2005 to study and play college soccer at Oklahoma Baptist University, where he was named an NAIA First-Team All-American in his junior year.

=== Professional ===
Silva signed with the USL First Division expansion franchise Austin Aztex. He made his professional debut on 18 April 2009, in Austin's USL1 season opener against Minnesota Thunder, and scored his first professional goal on 25 April 2009, in Austin's game against the Cleveland City Stars. Continued to play the 2010 season with Austin Aztex.

On 17 March 2011, Silva signed with Capital City F.C. of the Canadian Soccer League as the team's first signing. He made his debut for Capital City on 20 May 2011, in the team's first ever game against Toronto Croatia. Silva scored his first goal for the club on 3 June 2011, where he scored against Brampton United to help the club to its first ever home victory. Silva and Capital City went on to have a 12-game unbeaten streak which was broken by SC Toronto after losing 2–0 at home.

Sullivan Silva hit the second half of the season running scoring 10 goals and adding ten assists to help lead CCFC to a top three finish. In the second half of the season CCFC put on a second 12-game unbeaten streak and clinched home field advantage in the postseason by the September first. In the playoffs Silva scored three times in four games helping to lead CCFC to a "Cup Final" in their first season. Sullivan finished the season with 28 appearances and 26 starts. He also led CCFC in goals with 15 and finished second in the CSL in goals, and second on the team with assists. His season earned him a nomination for the MVP award for the CSL where he came in second. He still took home the CCFC players award for team MVP and the Supporters Award.

Since 2012, Sullivan has played in USL League Two with Canadian side Thunder Bay Chill.
