= Croatian World Club Championship =

- Founded: 2007
- Region: International (FIFA)
- Teams: 8
- Current champions: (Switzerland) NK Pajde Möhlin (1 title)
- Most championships: (Canada) Toronto Croatia (2 titles)
- 2015

The Croatian World Club Championship is a FIFA sanctioned international football tournament for Croatian diaspora football clubs. Founded in 2007, the tournament is organised by the Croatian Football Federation on behalf of the Croatian Heritage Foundation and Ministry of Foreign Affairs of Croatia.

== History ==
The Croatian World Club Championship was founded in 2007 by the Croatian Heritage Foundation and Ministry of Foreign Affairs of Croatia. The tournament is held every four years in Croatia by various host cities and venues. Clubs and teams with Croatian heritage or connections (Croatian diaspora) from around the world are selected for invitation to participate in the eight team tournament.

The inaugural tournament was hosted by Zagreb and surrounding region between 24 and 30 June 2007. Toronto Croatia won the first championship with a 3–1 victory over runner-up Canberra Croatia. Croatian Football Federation president Vlatko Marković presented Toronto the Championship trophy. Burgenland Croatian finished third.

The second tournament was hosted by Split and surrounding region between 26 June and 1 July 2011. Toronto Croatia claimed back to back titles in 2011 with a 5–0 victory in the championship final over runner-up Canberra Croatia. SV Dinamo Ottakring finished third.

The third edition of the tournament was hosted by Zagreb and surrounding region between 28 June and 4 July 2015. NK Pajde Möhlin won its first title in the 2015 edition of the tournament with a 4–0 victory in the championship final over runner-up Vojvođanski Hrvati. Toronto Croatia finished third.

== Format of Championship ==
=== Structure ===
- 8 teams compete
- Those 8 teams are separated into 2 groups of 4 teams each
- Winner of each group advances to the championship final
- Runner-up of each group advances to bronze play-off

=== Rules ===
- 3 points for a win
- 1 point for a draw
- 0 points for a loss
- Goal differences used to differentiate two teams on equal points in group stage

=== Schedule ===
- Group matches are played over three game days, each consisting of two matches
- The bronze play-off and championship final are played on the same day (fourth game day)

== 2007 Championship ==
2007 Croatian World Club Championship
Tournament details
- Host country: Croatia
- Dates: 24–30 June
- Teams: 8 (from 3 confederations)
- Venues: 7 (in 4 host cities)

Final positions
- Champions: (Canada) Toronto Croatia
- Runners-up: (Australia) Canberra Croatia
- Third place: (Austria) Burgenland Croatian
- Fourth place: (United States) HNK Zrinski Chicago

Tournament statistics
- Matches played: 14
- Goals scored: 53 (3.79 per match)
- Top scorer(s): (Australia) Paul Ivanić (Canberra FC) (5 goals)
- Best player(s): (Canada) Domagoj Šain (Croatia Toronto)
- Best goalkeeper: (Canada) Nathan Denham (Croatia Toronto)
- Fair play award: (Germany) NK Croatia Essen

The inaugural tournament was hosted by Zagrab and surrounding region between 24 and 30 June 2007. The eight teams selected to participate were: Toronto Croatia (Canada), SC Croat San Pedro (USA), HNK Zrinski Chicago (USA) from CONCACAF, Sydney United (Australia) from AFC, NK Croatia Essen (Germany), SD Croatia Berlin (Germany), AS Croatia Villefranche (France) and Burgenland Croatian (Austria) from UEFA. Of these only Burgenland was not an established club, but rather a selection side assembled after the Croatian World Games. Sydney United had to withdraw from the tournament due to financial and organisational reasons, so Canberra FC (known as Canberra Croatia at the tournament) stepped in to participate.

=== Group A ===
- (Canada) Toronto Croatia
- (Germany) NK Croatia Essen
- (United States) SC Croat San Pedro
- (Austria) Burgenland Croats

Team	G	W	D	L	GF	GA	GD	P
Toronto Croatia	3	3	0	0	12	2	+10	9
Burgenland Croatian	3	1	1	1	6	2	+4	4
SC Croat San Pedro	3	1	1	1	5	3	+2	4
NK Croatia Essen	3	0	0	3	0	17	-17	0

- 25 June 2007

Toronto Croatia - Burgenland Croatian 1:0 (0:0)
NK Croatia Essen - SC Croat San Pedro 0:3 (0:2)

- 27 June 2007

Burgenland Croatian - SC Croat San Pedro 1:1 (0:1)
Toronto Croatia - NK Croatia Essen 9:0 (4:0)

- 28 June 2007

Burgenland Croatian - NK Croatia Essen 5:0 (2:0)
Toronto Croatia - SC Croat San Pedro 2:1 (1:1)

=== Group B ===
- (Australia) Canberra Croatia
- (Germany) SD Croatia Berlin
- (United States) HNK Zrinski Chicago
- (France) AS Croatia Villefranche

Team	G	W	D	L	GF	GA	GD	P
Canberra Croatia	3	2	1	0	10	4	+6	7
HNK Zrinski Chicago	3	2	0	1	7	4	+3	6
SD Croatia Berlin	3	1	1	1	9	6	+3	4
AS Croatia Villefranche	3	0	0	3	2	14	-12	0

- 25 June 2007

SD Croatia Berlin - HNK Zrinski Chicago 1:3 (1:2)
AS Croatia Villefranche - Canberra Croatia 1:5 (0:0)

- 27 June 2007

AS Croatia Villefranche - HNK Zrinski Chicago 0:3 (0:1)
Canberra Croatia - SD Croatia Berlin 2:2 (1:1)

- 28 June 2007

AS Croatia Villefranche - SD Croatia Berlin 1:6 (0:3)
Canberra Croatia - HNK Zrinski Chicago 3:1 (1:1)

=== Bronze play-off ===
30 June 2007	Burgenland Croatian	4–1 (2-1)	HNK Zrinski Chicago	Zagreb, Croatia
16:00	Porić 20'; Kulović 41'; Pucović 48'; Johann Eisner 86'		Križanović 3'	Stadium: Stadion NŠC Stjepan Spajić

=== Final ===
30 June 2007	Toronto Croatia	3–1 (0-1)	Canberra Croatia	Zagreb, Croatia
18:30	Bedenikovic 2'; Robert Grnja 80'; Robert Fran 87'	(Report) (Report)	Ivanić 35'	Stadium: Stadion Kranjčevićeva; Attendance: 800; Referee: Ivan Bebek

== 2011 Championship ==
2011 Croatian World Club Championship
Tournament details
- Host country: Croatia
- Dates: 26 June - 2 July
- Teams: 8 (from 3 confederations)
- Venues: 7 (in 6 host cities)

Final positions
- Champions: (Canada) Toronto Croatia
- Runners-up: (Australia) Canberra Croatia
- Third place: (Austria) SV Dinamo Ottakring
- Fourth place: (United States) SC Croat San Pedro

Tournament statistics
- Matches played: 14
- Top scorer(s): (Canada) Tihomir Maletić (Croatia Toronto) (7 goals)
- Best player(s): (Canada) Tonći Pirija (Croatia Toronto)
- Best goalkeeper: (Canada) Sandi Matika (Croatia Toronto)

The second tournament was hosted by Split and surrounding region between 26 June - 2 July 2011. The eight teams selected to participate were: Toronto Croatia (Canada) and SC Croat San Pedro (USA) from CONCACAF, Canberra Croatia (Australia) from AFC, SV Dinamo Ottakring (Austria), SD Croatia Berlin (Germany), NK Croatia Zürich (Switzerland), NK Croatia Stuttgart (Germany) and NK Pajde Möhlin (Switzerland) from UEFA.

=== Group A ===
- (Canada) Toronto Croatia
- (Austria) SV Dinamo Ottakring
- (Germany) SD Croatia Berlin
- (Switzerland) NK Croatia Zürich

Team	G	W	D	L	GF	GA	GD	P
Toronto Croatia	3	3	0	0	9	1	+8	9
SV Dinamo Ottakring	3	1	1	1	3	5	-2	4
NK Croatia Zürich	3	0	2	1	1	4	-3	2
SD Croatia Berlin	3	0	1	2	2	5	-3	1

- 26 June 2011

Toronto Croatia - NK Croatia Zürich 4:1
SD Croatia Berlin - SV Dinamo Ottakring 2:3

- 28 June 2011

Toronto Croatia - SV Dinamo Ottakring 3:0
SD Croatia Berlin - NK Croatia Zürich 0:0

- 30 June 2011

Toronto Croatia - SD Croatia Berlin 2:0
SV Dinamo Ottakring - NK Croatia Zürich 0:0

=== Group B ===
- (Australia) Canberra Croatia
- (Switzerland) NK Pajde Möhlin
- (Germany) NK Croatia Stuttgart
- (United States) SC Croat San Pedro

Team	G	W	D	L	GF	GA	GD	P
Canberra Croatia	3	-	-	-	-	-	-	-
SC Croat San Pedro	3	-	-	-	-	-	-	-
NK Pajde Möhlin	3	-	-	-	-	-	-	-
NK Croatia Stuttgart	3	-	-	-	-	-	-	-

Final group placings source:

- 26 June 2011

Match details TBD
Match details TBD

- 28 June 2011

Match details TBD
Match details TBD

- 30 June 2011

Match details TBD
Match details TBD

=== Bronze play-off ===
2 July 2011	SC Croat San Pedro	2–1	SV Dinamo Ottakring	Split, Croatia
16:00		(Report)		Stadium: Stadion Poljud; Attendance: 300

=== Final ===
2 July 2011	Toronto Croatia	5–0 (3-0)	Canberra Croatia	Split, Croatia
18:30	Maletić 5', 16'; Tomac 33'; Škara 70'; Leko 90'	(Report)		Stadium: Stadion Poljud; Attendance: 300

== 2015 Championship ==
2015 Croatian World Club Championship
Tournament details
- Host country: Croatia
- Dates: 28 June - 4 July
- Teams: 8 (from 3 confederations)
- Venues: 8 (in 6 host cities)

Final positions
- Champions: (Switzerland) NK Pajde Möhlin
- Runners-up: (Serbia) Vojvođanski Hrvati
- Third place: (Canada) Toronto Croatia
- Fourth place: (Australia) Canberra Croatia

Tournament statistics
- Matches played: 14
- Goals scored: 45 (3.21 per match)
- Top scorer(s): (Switzerland) Igor Prijić (NK Pajde Möhlin) (8 goals)
- Best player(s): (Switzerland) Marko Zelenika (NK Pajde Möhlin)
- Best goalkeeper: (Serbia) Stefan Lebović (Vojvođanski Hrvati)
- Fair play award: (France) AS Croatia Villefranche

The third tournament was hosted by Zagreb and surrounding region between 28 June - 4 July 2015. The eight teams selected to participate were: Toronto Croatia (Canada) from CONCACAF, Sydney United 58 (Australia) and Canberra Croatia (Australia) from AFC, AS Croatia Villefranche (France), Vojvođanski Hrvati (Serbia), Croatia Malmö (Sweden), NK Croatia Stuttgart (Germany) and NK Pajde Möhlin (Switzerland) from UEFA. Of these only Vojvođanski Hrvati was not an established club, but rather a selection side from the autonomous region of Vojvodina in Serbia's north.

Croatian Football Federation President Davor Šuker and Zagreb Mayor Milan Bandić officially opened the tournament.

=== Group A ===
- (Canada) Toronto Croatia
- (Serbia) Vojvođanski Hrvati
- (Australia) Sydney United 58
- (France) AS Croatia Villefranche

Team	G	W	D	L	GF	GA	GD	P
Vojvođanski Hrvati	3	2	1	0	8	4	+4	7
Toronto Croatia	3	1	2	0	8	5	+3	5
AS Croatia Villefranche	3	1	1	1	8	4	+4	4
Sydney United 58	3	0	0	3	3	14	-11	0

- 28 June 2015

17:30 | Stadion Hrvatskog dragovoljca | Toronto Croatia - Sydney United 58 | 5:2 (1:1)

- 29 June 2015

18:30 | Stadion Hrvatskog dragovoljca | AS Croatia Villefranche - Vojvođanski Hrvati | 1:3

- 1 July 2015

16:00 | Stadion Intera, Zaprešić | Vojvođanski Hrvati - Sydney United 58 | 3:1
19:30 | Stadion Intera, Zaprešić | Toronto Croatia - AS Croatia Villefranche | 1:1 (0:0)

- 2 July 2015

18:30 | Stadion Lučko | Vojvođanski Hrvati - Toronto Croatia | 2:2 (1:0)
18:30 | Stadion Rudeša | Sydney United 58 - AS Croatia Villefranche | 0:6

=== Group B ===
- (Australia) Canberra Croatia
- (Switzerland) NK Pajde Möhlin
- (Germany) NK Croatia Stuttgart
- (Sweden) Croatia Malmö

Team	G	W	D	L	GF	GA	GD	P
NK Pajde Möhlin	3	3	0	0	9	3	+6	9
Canberra Croatia	3	1	1	1	4	5	-1	4
Croatia Malmö	3	0	2	1	3	4	-1	2
NK Croatia Stuttgart	3	0	1	2	2	6	-4	1

- 29 June 2015

16:30 | Stadion Sesveta | Canberra Croatia - Croatia Malmö | 0:0 (0:0)
18:30 | Stadion Sesveta | NK Croatia Stuttgart - NK Pajde Möhlin | 0:2 (0:2)

- 1 July 2015

16:30 | Stadion Gorice | NK Pajde Möhlin - Croatia Malmö | 3:2 (1:2)
18:30 | Stadion Gorice | Canberra Croatia - NK Croatia Stuttgart | 3:1 (1:0)

- 2 July 2015

18:30 | Stadion Lučko | NK Pajde Möhlin - Canberra Croatia | 4:1 (1:1)
18:30 | Stadion Rudeša | Croatia Malmö - NK Croatia Stuttgart | 1:1

=== Bronze play-off ===
4 July 2015	Toronto Croatia	3–0	Canberra Croatia	Zagreb, Croatia
16:00	Roberto Galle; Vučemilović-Grgić; Tihomir Maletić	(Report)		Stadium: Stadion ŠRC Sesvete

=== Final ===
4 July 2015	NK Pajde Möhlin	4–0 (1-0)	Vojvođanski Hrvati	Zagreb, Croatia
18:30	Prijić 45', 65'; Beširević 86', 88'	(Report)		Stadium: Stadion ŠRC Sesvete
