= Capital City F.C. =

Former Canadian association football team

Capital City FC
- Full name: Capital City Football Club
- Nickname(s): The City Boys, Les Blancs
- Founded: 2011
- Dissolved: 2012
- Stadium: Terry Fox Athletic Facility; Ottawa, ON
- Capacity: 2,000
- League: Canadian Soccer League
Home colours	Away colours

Capital City F.C. was a Canadian soccer team based in Ottawa, Ontario, which joined the Canadian Soccer League Canadian soccer pyramid, in January 2011. Founded by Neil Malhotra, the club pitch was Terry Fox Athletic Facility in Mooney's Bay Park. In April 2012, the club announced it would no longer field a team in future seasons.

== History ==
Head coach Shaun Anthony Harris led Capital City into 2011–13 season as head coach and technical director.

Capital City FC opened with a 2–0 loss on May 20, 2011, vs Toronto Croatia. The team quickly rebounded with a successful road trip where they beat both Mississauga Eagles FC(1-0) and TFC Academy (2-1). On May 28, 2011, Forward Junior Ellis scored the first goal in franchise history in the 73rd minute in a match vs TFC Academy. Alex Destine scored the winning goal later on to give CCFC their first ever win. The next day, Capital City and goalkeeper Clint Irwin earned their first clean sheet by beating Mississauga 1–0.

CCFC extended their winning streak to three games on June 3, 2011, with a 2–1 victory of Brampton City United. Sullivan Silva scored the game's winning goal in the 39th minute. Just over a week later, on June 12, Capital City blanked the Windsor Stars 2–0 to improve to 4-1-0 on the season.

The team continued their success and soon found themselves unbeaten in 12 games. They compiled many impressive victories on the way, including a 5–0 win on Canada Day over the North York Astros, a 4–1 win over London City. and a 2-1 comeback victory versus the Serbian White Eagles. Capital City FC continued their successful season within the Canadian Soccer League 1st Division, qualifying for the playoffs as early as August 18, 2011, with six weeks remaining in the regular season. CCFC continued their consistent form by finishing the 2011 season on a nine-game unbeaten streak, scoring sixteen times and only allowing three goals against within that run.

CCFC found themselves hosting the first round home and away aggregate series versus the Montreal Impact Academy, winning the series 3–2. CCFC advanced and hosted the Canadian Soccer League 1st Division single match, semi-final versus the Serbian White Eagles winning in impressive fashion 5-0 and earned a 1st Division spot in the Canadian Soccer League 1st Division "Cup Final" known as the CSL Championship. CCFC consistent results ran out with a 0–1 loss to eight time 1st Division champions Toronto Croatia. The 2011 season was capped off with Canadian Soccer League award nominees CSL League MVP nominee Sullivan Silva, CSL Goalkeeper of the Year nominee Clint Irwin and CSL winner of rookie of the year honours Akil DeFreitas. CCFC also announced their annual awards with Sullivan Silva capturing team MVP and the CCFC Supporters Award, Casey Cordray defender of the year, Emir Zrnic taking the young player of the year award and Francis LeTourneau as the club's most determined player. CCFC had the top attendance for the Canadian Soccer League in 2011.

In April 2013, CCFC stated it would no longer field a team in future seasons.

== Club ==
Capital City FC was a non-profit organisation meant to enrich soccer at all levels in the National Capital Region. The club funded local youth soccer clubs, and had Ottawa South United as its official youth club partner.

In addition, CCFC was very active in recruiting local players from local universities and colleges, as well as amateur clubs. Soccer is one of the most popular recreational sports in Ottawa, but clubs like Toronto FC and the Montreal Impact didn't do very much scouting there, and so the city has a very large untapped pool of soccer talent. In this way, Capital City worked as a gateway to the bigger clubs in Canada and around the world.

== Attendance ==
Capital City lead the CSL in average attendance, attracting over 1,000 fans to most of their home games. Peak attendance is believed to have been over 1,700 for their 2011 Givova Cup Semi-Final match against the Serbian White Eagles, a 5–0 win.

Capital City FC's supporters group is called "Bytown Boys Supporters Club". The Bytown Boys bring much energy to CCFC home games and use popular chants used by Toronto FC and Vancouver Whitecaps supporters' groups, in addition to original chants.

== Year-by-year ==
Year	League	Playoffs
2011	3rd	Runners-up
