= Mississauga Eagles FC =

- Full name: Mississauga Eagles Football Club
- Nickname: Eagles
- Founded: 2010
- Stadium: Hershey Field; Mississauga, Ontario
- Owner(s): Erin Mills Soccer Club
- GM: Susan Rossiter
- Coach: Alex Szczotka
- League: Canadian Soccer League
- 2013: Regular season: 7th Playoffs: Quarter-finals
- Website: www.mississaugaeaglesfc.com
Home colours	Away colours

Mississauga Eagles FC were a Canadian professional soccer team founded in 2010 that played in the Canadian Soccer League for two seasons. The Eagles were owned and operated by the Erin Mills Soccer Club and played at the Mississauga Hershey Field in the city of Mississauga, Ontario. In 2013, Erin Mills SC withdrew their franchise from the league after the CSA no longer decided to sanction the CSL.

== Erin Mills SC ==
The professional club was founded by the Erin Mills Soccer Club. Erin Mills SC was founded in 1972 and operates as a youth soccer club. The club is commonly known by the name Erin Mills Eagles.

== History ==
During the championship match of the 2010 CSL season, the former president of the league, Dominic Di Gironimo, announced that four expansion teams would begin play in 2011: Ottawa, Kitchener, Pickering (Pickering Power), and Erin Mills in Mississauga. On January 3, 2011, the Erin Mills Soccer Club, home of the Erin Mills Eagles, announced that it would be holding open tryouts for the newly revealed CSL expansion club Mississauga Eagles FC. The announcement also revealed the organization would field a CSL Reserve Team and Ontario Soccer League (OSL) senior men's team of the same name.

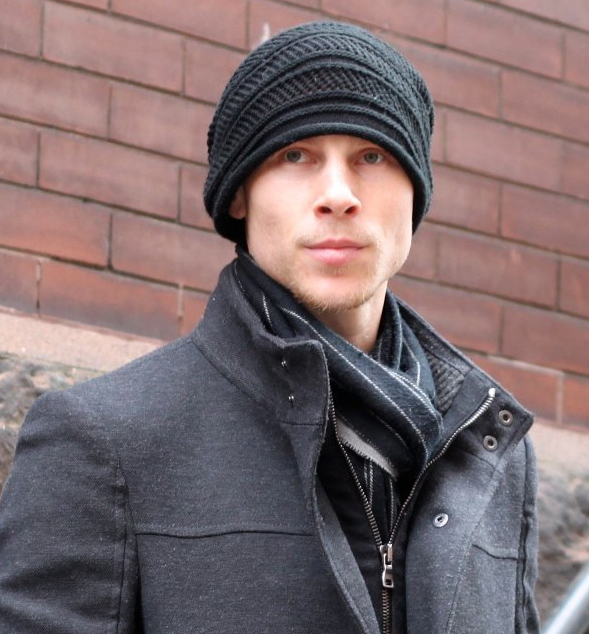
Former Erin Mills alumnus and Canadian International Andrew Ornoch played with Mississauga during their inaugural season.

Former CPSL, and Erin Mills Eagles coach Josef Komlodi was appointed the franchise's first head coach. Komlodi acquired the likes of Canadian internationals Andrew Ornoch, Dave Simpson. He also signed notable Erin Mills alumni Igor Pisanjuk, Joey Melo, Joevannie Peart, David Guzman, Gabe Gala, and CSL veteran Thierry Mangwa-Batomen. The club's home venue was located at Hershey Field, and Dave Simpson served as the team captain.

The club made its CSL debut on May 8, 2011, in a match against TFC Academy, where Mississauga came out with a 2–1 victory. Throughout the season, Mississauga secured a postseason berth by finishing seventh in the overall standings. Their opponents in the quarterfinals of the playoffs were Toronto Croatia, where Mississauga lost the series by a score of 8–1 on goals on aggregate. The following season the Eagles roster was radically different than from the previous year, due to many players going overseas to play in Europe. Assistant coach Alex Szczotka handled the head coach responsibilities for the 2012 season, while Komlodi served as technical director. Joey Melo was appointed the team captain for the season.

Mississauga failed to achieve their previous year success by failing to clinch the final playoff berth. In 2013 the Canadian Soccer Association de-sanctioned the CSL, and as a result Erin Mills Soccer Club decided to withdraw the Mississauga Eagles from the league.

== Head coaches ==
Years	Name	Nation
2011–2012	Josef Komlodi	Hungary
2012	Alex Szczotka	Poland

== Year-by-year ==
Year	Division	League	Regular season	Playoffs
2011	1	CSL	Seventh	Quarter-finals
2012	1	CSL	Tenth	Did not qualify

== See also ==
- Canadian Soccer League
- Toronto Croatia
- Toronto FC
- Mississauga Eagles P.S.C.
