= CF Montréal Academy =

Soccer academy in Quebec, Canada

- Full name: L’Académie du CF Montréal
- Founded: 2010
- Stadium: Centre Nutrilait; Montreal, Quebec
- Owner: Joey Saputo
- Head coach: U17: Maxime Leconte; U15: Esteban Landazabal
- League: MLS Next; Canadian Soccer League (2012); Exhibition season (2013)
- Website: https://en.cfmontreal.com/academy/
Home colours	Away colours

CF Montréal Academy (French: L’Académie du CF Montréal, formerly Montreal Impact Academy) is a soccer academy based in Montreal, Quebec, Canada. They are the academy of Major League Soccer club CF Montréal. Founded in 2010, they operated a team in the Canadian Soccer League from 2010 to 2012. Their U-23 team played in the USL Premier Development League in 2014.

== History ==
The club was founded in 2010 by the original Montreal Impact after Trois-Rivières Attak decided to take a sabbatical for the 2010 season. Attak owner Tony Iannitto waived his players' rights and opened his territory for the benefit of the Impact Academy. Montreal repatriated all the players and coaching staff from Trois-Rivières to form the Academy while the Attak decided to sit out the 2010 season for undisclosed reasons. Head Coach Philippe Eullaffroy recruited several promising players like Karl Ouimette, Maxim Tissot, Maxime Crépeau, Alessandro Riggi, Valentin Radevich, Kevin Cossette, Kevin Luarca, Mircea Ilcu, and Anthony Jackson-Hamel. Saputo Stadium served as their first home venue. The club made its debut on May 15, 2010, in a match against Milltown F.C. which ended in a 0–0 draw. In their debut season in the CSL, Montreal finished ninth in the standings, missing the final postseason berth by two points. For the 2011 season, notable academy graduates were Wandrille Lefèvre, Zakaria Messoudi, Victor N'Diaye, Philippe Lincourt-Joseph, and Jonathan Vallée. In their second season, Montreal clinched their first postseason berth by finishing sixth in the standings, and finished with the fourth-best offensive record within the league. Their opponents in the quarterfinals were Capital City F.C., where in the first match the Impact tied Ottawa to a 1–1 draw with a goal from Lefèvre. In the second leg of the series, Montreal suffered a 2–1 defeat, with Luarca recording the lone Montreal goal, which eliminated Montreal from the playoffs by a score of 3–2 on goals on aggregate.

In 2012, Yacine Ait-Slimane, Jérémy Gagnon-Laparé, and Stefan Vukovic were some of the notable alumni who played with Montreal. During the season, Montreal achieved a nine-game undefeated streak and recorded a franchise milestone by finishing as runners-up in the standings with the second-best offensive and t defensive record. In the first round of the playoffs, the team faced TFC Academy and secured a 2–0 victory with both goals from Ilcu. In the next round. the Impact faced the York Region Shooters and advanced to the CSL Championship finals by defeating York Region by a score of 3–1, with Lefevre and Ait-Slimane contributing the goals. Their opponents in the finals were Toronto Croatia, but Montreal fell short by a 1–0 defeat. At the CSL awards ceremony, Tissot received the CSL Defender of the Year award.

In 2013, head coach Eullaffroy was promoted to the senior team as an assistant coach. After the De-sanctioning of the CSL by the CSA, the club left the league. In 2013–14, the U-17/18 team played in the U.S. Soccer Development Academy. In 2014, the Academy joined the USL Premier Development League.

In May 2023, the club launched a women's academy program, also taking control of the Program Excel Féminin, a national development center of Soccer Québec, which brings together the best players in the province from 15 to 18 years old, including the Ligue1 Québec women's team.

== Staff ==
Executive
President	Joey Saputo
Executive vice president	(Canada) Richard Legendre
Vice president	John Di Terlizzi
Technical director	(Canada) Nick De Santis
Coaching staff
Head coach	(France) Philippe Eullaffroy
Assistant coach	(Canada) Nicolas Gagnon

== Year-by-year ==
=== Outdoor team ===
Year	League	Reg. season	Playoffs	Avg. attendance
2010	Canadian Soccer League	9th	DNQ	
2011	Canadian Soccer League	6th	Quarter-finals	
2012	Canadian Soccer League	2nd	Runners up	

=== U17/18 team ===
Year	League	Reg. season	Playoffs	Avg. attendance
2013–14	U.S. Soccer Development Academy			

=== U23 Team ===
Year	League	Reg. season	Playoffs	Avg. attendance
2014	PDL	Northeast Division, 4th	DNQ	

== Stadium ==
The Academy currently plays its home games at Saputo Stadium, a soccer-specific stadium which opened in May 2008. As the name suggests, the stadium was funded privately (mainly by the Saputo family). Seating 20,341 supporters, Saputo Stadium is located just east of Olympic Stadium in the city's east end. Currently the seating is restricted just to the north grand stand.

- CS St Jean De Vianney (2012-)

== Notable players ==
Canada

- Yacine Ait-Slimane (2012–14)
- Jason Beaulieu (2010–12)
- Louis Béland-Goyette (2011–14)
- Nazim Belguendouz (2014)
- Janouk Charbonneau (2012–14)
- Kevin Cossette (2010–14)
- Maxime Crépeau (2010–13)
- John Dinkota (2010–14)
- Jérémy Gagnon-Laparé (2011–14)
- Jems Geffrard (2011–15)
- Chakib Hocine (2014)
- Emad Houache (2012–15)
- Anthony Jackson-Hamel (2010–14)
- Charles Joly (2012–14)
- Mastanabal Kacher (2012–15)
- Frédéric Lajoie-Gravelle 2013–14
- Wandrille Lefèvre (2011–13
- Philippe Lincourt-Joseph (2012–14)
- Kevin Luarca (2011–13)
- Zakaria Messoudi (2010–13)
- Aron Mkungilwa (2012–13)
- Victor N'Diaye (2011–14)
- Karl Ouimette (2010–12)
- David Paulmin (2012–15)
- Zachary Sukunda (2012–15)
- Marco Terminesi (2008)
- Maxim Tissot (2009–13)
- Jonathan Vallée (2012–14)
- Stefan Vukovic (2012)

Belarus

- Valentin Radevich (2010–13)

Germany

- Mélé Temguia (2012–15)

Romania

- Mircea Ilcu (2010)
