= 2013 Canadian Soccer League season =

Canadian Soccer League First Division
- Season: 2013
- Champions: Kingston FC (regular season); SC Waterloo (playoffs)
- Matches: 132
- Goals: 477 (3.61 per match)
- Top goalscorer: 28 goals: Guillaume Surot
- Best goalkeeper: Antonio Ilic
- Biggest home win: SCW 9–0 STC (September 29)
- Biggest away win: AST 0–4 YRS (June 23); SCW 0–4 TOR (August 4); BRA 0–4 TOR (September 14)
- Highest scoring: 9 goals: KFC 6–3 LON (June 16); SCW 9–0 STC (September 29)

The 2013 Canadian Soccer League season was the 16th since its establishment where a total of 21 teams from Ontario took part in the league. The season began on May 3, 2013, and concluded on November 3, 2013. SC Waterloo captured their first championship in a 3–1 victory over regular season champions Kingston FC in the CSL Championship final at Kalar Sports Park in Niagara Falls, Ontario. Waterloo became the first club to win both the First and Second Division championships in one season. While Toronto Croatia B won the second division regular season title.

The 2013 season was a controversial year where the Canadian Soccer Association announced that they would de-sanction the CSL just two months before the commencement of their season. The CSA's stated reasons were in order to implement the James Easton Report (Rethink Management Group Report) for the adoption of a new semi-professional soccer structure. In response to the move conducted by the CSA the league appealed to the Sport Dispute Resolution Centre of Canada (SDRCC), where the sport arbitrator ruled that the CSA have the right to de-sanction the CSL, but ruled that the immediate decisions and actions conducted by the CSA were unreasonable and coercive. The governing body was required to reinstate sanctioning to the CSL until the next season in order for the CSA to work with all existing leagues to fairly implement the Easton Report. Another controversial moment occurred when the CBC issued an article written by Ben Rycroft in which anonymous sources from the CSA claimed that the CSA decided to no longer sanction the CSL primarily based on the alleged reports of match fixing in the league. During the SDRCC hearing, CSA president Victor Montagliani stated that the decision to de-sanction the CSL was not made on any alleged grounds of match fixing in the CSL but strictly on the decision made by the CSA board of directors to adopt a new soccer structure in Canada.

The aftermath of the sanctioning issue resulted in a decrease in teams in both the first and second divisions as the two MLS academy clubs along with Brantford Galaxy, Mississauga Eagles FC, and SC Toronto left the league. Though the league did return to the Halton region with the addition of Burlington SC. Both Rogers TV and Cogeco TV continued broadcasting CSL matches throughout Southern Ontario. The CSL youth development system continued its success with four Montreal Impact Academy players being signed to the first team in the MLS before their departure from the league.

== First Division ==
=== Teams ===
Out of the 12 teams this season, 11 returned from the 2012 season. The only expansion team was Burlington SC. The academy clubs of Toronto FC and Montreal Impact, as well as SC Toronto, quit the league, while two teams - Mississauga Eagles FC and Brantford Galaxy - will skip the current season, but retained their membership and hope to rejoin the league in 2014. While North York Astros merged with Toronto Vasas to form Astros Vasas FC.

Team	City	Stadium	Manager
Astros Vasas FC	Toronto, ON (North York)	Esther Shiner Stadium	László Kiss
Brampton United	Brampton, ON (Bramalea)	Victoria Park Stadium	Juan Barreto
Burlington SC	Burlington, ON	Nelson Stadium	William Tabi
Kingston FC	Kingston, ON	Queens West Field	Colm Muldoon
London City	London, ON (Westmount)	Hellenic Com Centre	Tomo Dancetovic
Niagara United	Niagara Falls, ON	Kalar Sports Park	James McGillivray
SC Waterloo Region	Waterloo, ON	Warrior Field	Lazo Džepina
Serbian White Eagles	Toronto (Etobicoke)	Centennial Park Stadium	Uroš Stamatović
St. Catharines Roma Wolves	St. Catharines (Vansickle)	Club Roma Park	Carlo Arghittu
Toronto Croatia	Toronto (Etobicoke)	Centennial Park Stadium	Velimir Crljen
Windsor Stars	Windsor, ON	Windsor Stadium	Steve Vagnini
York Region Shooters	Vaughan, ON (Maple)	St. Joan of Arc Stadium	John Pacione

Location of CSL teams outside of Toronto for the 2013 CSL season.
Location of CSL teams in Toronto for the 2013 CSL season.

=== Results ===
Home \ Away	AST	BRA	BSC	KFC	LON	NIA	SCW	SER	STC	TOR	WIN	YRS
Astros Vasas		2–2	0–2	1–3	2–0	3–3	1–4	1–0	0–1	0–3	4–1	0–4
Brampton United	1–2		1–0	2–1	0–2	3–0	4–1	1–0	3–0	0–4	3–1	2–3
Burlington SC	1–2	1–3		3–5	3–2	0–2	3–2	2–1	1–2	2–3	1–4	0–3
Kingston FC	6–0	6–2	2–1		6–3	5–2	4–2	6–0	5–1	0–1	2–1	2–1
London City	2–0	4–2	3–4	1–3		0–0	3–2	2–2	2–0	0–2	3–1	2–2
Niagara United	2–4	1–3	0–2	2–4	2–3		0–2	1–3	0–2	1–2	1–4	1–2
SC Waterloo Region	0–0	3–2	4–2	0–2	4–2	1–1		4–0	9–0	0–4	2–0	5–0
Serbian White Eagles	3–0	0–2	6–2	1–1	2–1	0–1	1–2		1–3	1–0	3–1	1–2
St. Catharines Wolves	2–3	1–3	0–2	0–2	1–2	2–3	1–3	2–1		2–1	1–0	0–1
Toronto Croatia	3–3	2–0	4–1	3–2	4–1	1–1	0–0	2–0	3–0		2–1	2–2
Windsor Stars	4–1	1–2	3–0	2–2	3–1	3–2	2–2	0–3	2–0	2–2		1–0
York Region Shooters	1–0	1–2	4–1	1–0	3–0	5–1	1–0	0–1	6–1	2–0	3–0	

Updated to match(es) played on October 6, 2013. Source: Various Team Websites
Legend: Blue = home team win; Yellow = draw; Red = away team win.

=== Positions by round ===
Team ╲ Round	1	2	3	4	5	6	7	8	9	10	11	12	13	14	15	16	17	18	19	20	21	22
Kingston FC	1	4	2	2	2	2	1	2	1	3	3	3	2	2	2	1	1	1	1	1	1	1
York Region Shooters	5	3	6	7	7	5	4	4	4	2	1	1	3	3	3	2	2	2	2	2	2	2
Toronto Croatia	4	1	1	1	1	1	3	1	2	4	4	4	4	4	4	4	4	3	3	3	3	3
Brampton United	12	7	4	3	3	3	2	3	3	1	2	2	1	1	1	3	3	4	4	4	4	4
SC Waterloo Region	6	2	5	4	5	6	5	5	5	5	5	5	6	6	5	6	5	5	5	5	5	5
Windsor Stars	9	5	7	5	4	4	6	6	6	9	6	6	5	5	6	5	6	6	6	6	6	6
London City	7	9	11	12	9	11	9	11	7	7	7	7	7	7	7	7	7	7	7	7	7	7
Serbian White Eagles	2	6	3	6	6	7	7	9	10	10	9	10	8	10	10	8	8	8	9	10	8	8
Astros Vasas	11	12	12	9	10	12	12	12	12	11	11	11	11	9	9	11	11	11	10	9	9	9
Burlington SC	9	11	8	8	8	8	10	7	8	6	8	8	9	8	8	9	9	9	11	11	10	10
St. Catharines Wolves	3	8	9	10	11	9	11	8	9	8	10	9	10	11	11	10	10	10	8	8	11	11
Niagara United	7	10	10	11	12	10	8	10	11	12	12	12	12	12	12	12	12	12	12	12	12	12

Source: canadiansoccerleague.com

=== Standings ===
Pos	Team	Pld	W	D	L	GF	GA	GD	Pts	Qualification
1	Kingston FC (C)	22	16	2	4	69	30	+39	50	Qualification for Playoffs
2	York Region Shooters	22	15	2	5	47	22	+25	47	Qualification for Playoffs
3	Toronto Croatia	22	14	5	3	48	21	+27	47	Qualification for Playoffs
4	Brampton United	22	13	1	8	43	36	+7	40	Qualification for Playoffs
5	SC Waterloo Region (O)	22	11	4	7	52	33	+19	37	Qualification for Playoffs
6	Windsor Stars	22	8	3	11	37	40	−3	27	Qualification for Playoffs
7	London City	22	8	3	11	39	48	−9	27	Qualification for Playoffs
8	Serbian White Eagles	22	8	2	12	30	36	−6	26	Qualification for Playoffs
9	Astros Vasas FC	22	7	4	11	29	48	−19	25	
10	Burlington SC	22	7	0	15	34	56	−22	21	
11	St. Catharines Wolves	22	7	0	15	22	53	−31	21	
12	Niagara United	22	3	4	15	27	54	−27	13	

Source: []
Rules for classification: 1) points; 2) goal difference; 3) number of goals scored.
(C) Champions; (O) Play-off winners

=== Goal scorers ===
Rank	Scorer	Club	Goals
1	(France) Guillaume Surot	Kingston FC	28
2	(Croatia) Marin Vučemilović Grgić	London City	19
3	(Jamaica) Richard West	York Region Shooters	19
4	(Bosnia and Herzegovina) Adis Hasečić	SC Waterloo Region	17
5	(Canada) Miloš Šćepanović	Brampton United	16
6	(Croatia) Dražen Vuković	SC Waterloo Region	15
7	(Canada) Marcos Nunes	Brampton United	13
8	(Canada) Nicholas Lindsay	Burlington SC	11
9	(Romania) Cătălin Lichioiu	Kingston FC	10
9	(Croatia) Krešimir Prgomet	Toronto Croatia	10

Updated: April 30, 2017
Source: http://canadiansoccerleague.ca/2013-csl-first-division-stats/

=== Bracket ===
The top 8 teams will qualify for the one-game quarter final, and a one-game semi-final leading to the championship game to be played on November 3 at Kalar Sports Park.

Quarter-Final
1	Kingston FC	2
8	Serbian White Eagles	1
2	York Region Shooters	1 (2)
7	London City	1 (4)
3	Toronto Croatia	2
6	Windsor Stars	0
4	Brampton United	0
5	SC Waterloo Region	4

Semi-Final
1	Kingston FC	4
7	London City	2
3	Toronto Croatia	1 (4)
5	SC Waterloo Region	1 (5)

Final
1	Kingston FC	1
5	SC Waterloo Region	3

==== Quarterfinals ====
October 11, 2013	York Region Shooters	1–1 (a.e.t.) (2–4 p)	London City	Maple, Ontario
8:00 ET	Mario Orestano 119'	(Report)	Aldin Kukic 110'	Stadium: St. Joan of Arc Field; Attendance: 120; Referee: Manuel Orellano (Ontario)
	Penalties
	Francisco Javier Perez (penalty missed); Gardner (penalty scored); Fitzroy Christey (penalty missed); Gomez (penalty scored)		Vučemilović-Grgić (penalty scored); Pirija (penalty scored); Vukomanović (penalty scored); Younan Samra (penalty scored)

October 12, 2013	Toronto Croatia	2–0	Windsor Stars	Toronto, Ontario
7:00 ET	Jarek Whiteman 100', 106'	(Report)		Stadium: Centennial Park Stadium; Attendance: 120; Referee: Michael Anthony Izzo (Ontario)

October 13, 2013	Kingston FC	2–1	Serbian White Eagles	Kingston, Ontario
1:00 ET	Nathan Klemencic 51'; Kihara Waiganjo 104'	(Report) (Report)	Stefan Racic 90'	Stadium: Queens West Field; Attendance: 300; Referee: Pierre Acouri (Ontario)

October 14, 2013	Brampton United	0–4	SC Waterloo	Brampton, Ontario
7:00 ET		(Report)	Fazlagić 30'; Hasečić 44'; Vuković 88'; Zoran Kukić 90+4'	Stadium: Terry Fox Stadium; Attendance: 150; Referee: Ramee Arbaji (Ontario)

==== Semifinals ====
October 19, 2013	Toronto Croatia	1–1 (a.e.t.) (4–5 p)	SC Waterloo	Toronto, Ontario
7:00 ET	Fitzwilliams 62'	(Report)	Vuković 54'	Stadium: Centennial Park Stadium; Attendance: 100; Referee: Lyes Arfa (Quebec)
	Penalties
	Keran (penalty missed); Hrvoje Perkovic (penalty scored); Boze Poljak (penalty scored); Jarek Whiteman (penalty scored); Roberto Galle (penalty scored)		Hasečić (penalty scored); Inglis (penalty scored); Mirza Colic (penalty scored); Fazlagić (penalty scored); Vuković (penalty scored)

October 20, 2013	Kingston FC	4–2	London City	Kingston, Ontario
6:30 ET	Lichioiu 23'; Surot 42', 80'; Edgar Soglo 90'	(Report) (Report)	Vučemilović-Grgić 12'; Younan Samra 54'	Stadium: Queens West Field; Attendance: 700

==== CSL Championship ====
November 3, 2013
2:30 PM

Kingston FC	1 – 3	SC Waterloo Region
Nathan Klemencic 60'	Report	Zelenbaba 30', 74'; Fazlagić 81'

Kalar Sports Park
Niagara Falls, Ontario
Attendance: 400
Referee: Justin Tasev (Ontario)

GK	30	(Czech Republic) Jaroslav Tesař
RB	3	(Canada) Rory Kennedy
CB	6	(Canada) Austin White (c)
CB	5	(Northern Ireland) Ryan McCurdy
LB	17	(Canada) Hugo Delmaire	(substituted off) 73'
RM	7	(Canada) Nathan Klemencic	(substituted off) 85'
CM	32	(Canada) Kenny Caceros	(substituted off) 88'
CM	15	(England) Jason Massie
LM	12	(Canada) Edgar Soglo
ST	23	(France) Guillaume Surot
ST	16	(Romania) Cătălin Lichioiu
Substitutes:
GK	1	(Japan) Yasuto Hoshiko
DF	2	(Guyana) Taylor Benjamin	(substituted on) 73'
MF	11	(Canada) Michael Smith	(substituted on) 85'
MF	21	(Canada) Tony El-Asmar	(substituted on) 88'
MF	28	(Canada) Joey Pineo
MF	29	(Canada) Kihara Waiganjo
FW	9	(Senegal) Mademba Ba
Manager:
(Republic of Ireland) Colm Muldoon

GK	1	(Bosnia and Herzegovina) Imad Hukara
RB	9	(Canada) Shawn Brown
CB	5	(Bosnia and Herzegovina) Dado Hadrović
CB	3	(Serbia) Nemanja Simeunović
LB	8	(Bosnia and Herzegovina) Mirza Čolić
RM	14	(Bosnia and Herzegovina) Adis Hasečić
CM	4	(Bosnia and Herzegovina) Haris Fazlagić
CM	6	(Serbia) Vladimir Zelenbaba
CM	7	(Canada) Jake Inglis
LM	11	(Serbia) Ranko Golijanin	(substituted off) 73'
FW	10	(Croatia) Dražen Vuković (c)
Substitutes:
GK	12	(Serbia) Zoran Pušica
DF	13	(Canada) Dale Cudmore
DF	21	(Canada) Thomas Sackor
MF	17	(Canada) Darragh Roe
MF	18	(Canada) Edward Syllie
MF	20	(Scotland) David Muir	(substituted on) 73'
FW	19	(Iran) Mohammed-Ali Heydarpour
Manager:
(Croatia) Lazo Džepina

Assistant referees:
Michael Stenbring
Fabrizio Stasolia
Fourth official:
David Barrie

=== Individual awards ===
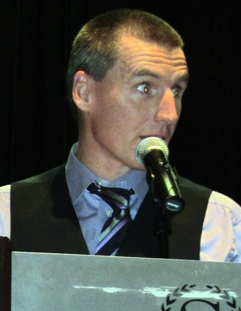
Colm Muldoon was voted the Coach of the Year

The annual CSL awards ceremony was held at the Sheraton on the Falls Hotel in Niagara Falls, Ontario on November 2, 2013. The majority of the awards went to regular season champions Kingston FC. Guillaume Surot became the first player in CSL history to claim three individual awards in a season. The Frenchman took home the MVP, Golden Boot, and the Rookie of the Year. While head coach Colm Muldoon with coaching credentials from Ireland was given the Coach of the Year award.

After establishing the best defensive record within the league Antonio Illic and Sven Arapovic of Toronto Croatia were voted the Goalkeeper and Defender of the Year for the second time in their careers. The league champions SC Waterloo received their first Fair Play and Respect award. Former Toronto Croatia club executive and CSL league administrator Pino Jazbec was given the Harry Paul Gauss award for his years of commitment and allegiance to the league. The CSL Referee Committee voted in favor of Justin Tasev as the best match official throughout the season.

Award	Player (Club)
CSL Most Valuable Player	Guillaume Surot (Kingston FC)
CSL Golden Boot	Guillaume Surot (Kingston FC)
CSL Goalkeeper of the Year Award	Antonio Ilic (Toronto Croatia)
CSL Defender of the Year Award	Sven Arapovic (Toronto Croatia)
CSL Rookie of the Year Award	Guillaume Surot (Kingston FC)
CSL Coach of the Year Award	Colm Muldoon (Kingston FC)
Harry Paul Gauss Award	Pino Jazbec (CSL League Administrator)
CSL Referee of the Year Award	Justin Tasev
CSL Fair Play Award	SC Waterloo

== Second Division ==
Canadian Soccer League Second Division
- Season: 2013
- Champions: Toronto Croatia B (Second Division regular season); SC Waterloo B (Second Division playoffs)
- Matches: 72
- Goals: 280 (3.89 per match)
- Top goalscorer: Mademba Ba (17)

=== Teams ===
Team	City	Stadium	Manager
Brampton City United B	Brampton, Ontario	Victoria Park Stadium	Juan Barreto
Kingston FC B	Kingston, Ontario	CaraCo Home Field Invista Centre	Gabriel Cassis
London City B	London, Ontario	Cove Road Stadium	Jasmin Halkic
Niagara United B	Niagara Falls, Ontario	Kalar Sports Park	James McGillivray
SC Waterloo B	Waterloo, Ontario	Seagram Stadium	Lazo Dzepina
Serbian White Eagles B	Toronto, Ontario	Centennial Park Stadium	Sasa Vukovic
St. Catharines Wolves B	St. Catharines, Ontario	Club Roma Stadium	Chris Kijak
Toronto Croatia B	Toronto, Ontario	Centennial Park Stadium	George Jenkins
York Region Shooters B	Vaughan, Ontario	St. Joan Of Arc Turf Field	Sam Medeiros

=== Standings ===
Pos	Team	Pld	W	D	L	GF	GA	GD	Pts	Qualification
1	Toronto Croatia B (A)	16	9	3	4	37	27	+10	30	Playoffs
2	Niagara United B (A)	16	8	5	3	40	30	+10	29	Playoffs
3	London City B (A)	16	9	1	6	39	25	+14	28	Playoffs
4	St. Catharines Wolves B (A)	16	8	2	6	33	33	0	26	Playoffs
5	Brampton United B (A)	16	7	4	5	31	20	+11	25	Playoffs
6	SC Waterloo Region B (A)	16	6	3	7	23	30	−7	21	Playoffs
7	York Region Shooters B (A)	16	5	5	6	29	26	+3	20	Playoffs
8	Kingston FC B (A)	16	5	2	9	32	42	−10	17	Playoffs
9	Serbian White Eagles B	16	2	1	13	16	46	−30	7	

Updated to match(es) played on October 7, 2013. Source: http://canadiansoccerleague.com/schedules/res_standings.htm
Rules for classification: 1) points; 2) goal difference; 3) number of goals scored.
(A) Advance to a further round

=== Bracket ===
Quarter-Final
1	Toronto Croatia B	2
8	Kingston FC B	1
2	Niagara United B	2 (3)
7	York Region Shooters B	2 (4)
4	St. Catharines Wolves B	3
5	Brampton United B	5
3	London City B	1
6	SC Waterloo Region B	3

Semi-Final
1	Toronto Croatia B	2
7	York Region Shooters B	0
5	Brampton United B	1
6	SC Waterloo Region B	5

Final
1	Toronto Croatia B	0
6	SC Waterloo Region B	2

==== CSL D2 Championship ====
November 3, 2013
12:00 PM

Toronto Croatia B	0 – 2	SC Waterloo B
	Report	Erwin Uzunovic 11'; Mohammed-Ali Heydarpour 88'

Kalar Sports Park
Niagara Falls, Ontario
Attendance: 100
Referee: Ramee Arbaji (Ontario)

GK	36	(Canada) Fiore Costa
RB	9	(Canada) Ivan Beram
CB	22	(Canada) Ivica Sunjka
CB	6	(Canada) Daniel Stoker (c)
LB	3	(Canada) Alexander Manta	(substituted off) 84'
RM	24	(Canada) Ahmed Salama
CM	7	(Canada) Jack Crawford	(substituted off) 32'
CM	10	(Canada) Peter Vidovic
LM	8	(Canada) Mykola Chachula
ST	15	(Canada) Josip Stanic	(substituted off) 67'
ST	11	(Canada) Bohdan Sulypka
Substitutes:
GK	1	(Canada) Ivan Skoko
DF	16	(Canada) Arthur Kopycki
MF	14	(Canada) Nikola Bosnjak	(substituted on) 32'
MF	20	(Canada) Mark Grzesiowski	(substituted on) 84'
MF	21	(Canada) Patrick Dolowicz	(substituted on) 67'
FW	4	(Canada) Luke Sperr
Manager:
(Canada) George Jenkins

GK	12	(Serbia) Zoran Pusica
RB	2	(Canada) Zoran Kukic
CB	6	(Canada) Terel Christian
CB	9	(Canada) Stefan Brisevac
LB	3	(Canada) Dale Cudmore (c)
RM	8	(Canada) Erwin Uzunovic	(substituted off) 81'
CM	19	(Iran) Mohammed-Ali Heydarpour
CM	4	(Canada) Xavier Gillespe
LM	17	(Canada) Darragh Roe	(substituted off) 92'
FW	10	(Canada) Mohamed Aborig	(substituted off) 59'
FW	10	(Canada) Kevin Benavides	(substituted off) 77'
Substitutes:
DF	5	(Canada) Marko Djukic
DF	15	(Canada) Luis Cordero Monroy
DF	21	(Canada) Thomas Sackor	(substituted on) 77'
MF	7	(Canada) Saul Campos	(substituted on) 81'
MF	18	(Canada) Edward Syllie	(substituted on) 59'
MF	13	(Canada) Mohammad Hassan Syed
FW	16	(Canada) Thomas Ang	(substituted on) 92'
Manager:
(Croatia) Lazo Dzepina

Assistant referees:
Benjamin Jacobs
Scott Bowman
Fourth official:
Brian Butler

=== Individual awards ===
Award	Player (Club)
CSL Most Valuable Player	Yonan Samara (London City B)
CSL Golden Boot	Mademba Ba (Kingston FC B)
CSL Goalkeeper of the Year Award	Roy Seaboyer (Brampton City Utd B)
CSL Defender of the Year Award	Daniel Stoker (Toronto Croatia B)
CSL Rookie of the Year Award	Mykola Chachula (Toronto Croatia B)
CSL Coach of the Year Award	George Jenkins (Toronto Croatia B)

== CSL Executive Committee and Staff ==
The 2013 CSL Executive Committee.

Position	Name	Nationality
Chairman:	Vincent Ursini	(Canada) Canadian
Director of Media and PR:	Stan Adamson	(England) English
League Administrator:	Pino Jazbec	(Canada) Canadian
Director of Officials:	Tony Camacho	(Portugal) Portuguese
Director for Youth:	Phil Ionadi	(Canada) Canadian
