= Cătălin Lichioiu =

Romanian footballer

Personal information
- Full name: Cătălin Sergiu Lichioiu
- Date of birth: 20 January 1981 (age 45)
- Place of birth: Brașov, Romania
- Height: 1.78 m (5 ft 10 in)
- Position: Attacking midfielder

Youth career
- Tractorul Brașov

Senior career*
Years	Team	Apps	(Gls)
2001–2003	Tractorul Brașov	28	(0)
2003–2006	Nistru Otaci	51	(19)
2006–2008	Vorskla Poltava	38	(4)
2008	Vostok	19	(1)
2010–2011	Olimpia Bălți	8	(1)
2011–2013	Nistru Otaci	48	(4)
2013–2014	Kingston FC	40	(18)
- * Club domestic league appearances and goals

Cătălin Sergiu Lichioiu (born 20 January 1981) is a Romanian former professional footballer who played as a forward.

Lichioiu began his career in his native Romania and, in 2003, moved to neighboring Moldova. In Moldova, he played for Nistru Otaci, where he appeared in European competitions and won silverware with the club. Following his stint in Moldova, he played in the Ukrainian top-tier league with Vorskla Poltava. In 2008, he played in Kazakhstan for a season, and in 2010 he returned to Moldova. After two seasons in Canada, he finished his football career.

== Club career ==
=== Early career ===
Lichioiu began his career in 2001 with his hometown club Tractorul Brașov in both the Divizia B and Divizia C.

In 2003, he trained with Moldovan side Petrocub Hîncești for six months, but ultimately secured a contract with Nistru Otaci. He helped the team finish second in the Moldovan National Division, which secured them a berth in the 2004–05 UEFA Cup. In his debut season, he appeared in the 2003–04 UEFA Cup against Red Star Belgrade. The following season, Nistru once again finished second and qualified for the UEFA Cup. He also won the Moldovan Cup, defeating Dacia Chișinău, and finished as the top league goal scorer. In the UEFA Cup, he played against Salihorsk and Sigma Olomouc. In his final season with Nistru, he played in the 2005–06 UEFA Cup against Khazar Lankaran and Grazer AK.

=== Ukraine ===
In the winter of 2006, he was invited to Vorskla Poltava's training camp for a trial. Ultimately, he secured a contract with Poltava to compete in the Ukrainian Premier League. He debuted on March 5, 2006, against Chornomorets Odesa. Lichioiu was re-signed for the following season. He also debuted in the Ukrainian Cup against Oleksandriya. He was released in 2008.

In 2008, he signed for Vostok in the Kazakhstan Premier League. He also participated in the Kazakhstan Cup, where Vostok reached the semifinals. After his season in Kazakhstan, he suffered an injury that sidelined him for two seasons.

After his stint in Kazakhstan, he returned to Moldova and signed with Olimpia Bălți. In his debut season, he played in the 2010–11 Moldovan Cup final, where they lost to Iskra-Stal. After a season in Bălți, he returned to Nistru Otaci. Throughout the season, he was linked with a move to league rival Sheriff Tiraspol. Lichioiu left the club in October 2012 as it faced financial difficulties.

=== Canada ===
In the summer of 2013, Lichioiu signed with Kingston FC of the Canadian Soccer League and was named the team captain. In his debut, he scored his first goal against Brampton City United on May 5, 2013. Throughout the season, he helped Kingston achieve an 11-game undefeated streak and secure the league's first division title. In the opening round of the playoffs, the club defeated the Serbian White Eagles. Their next opponents were London City, where Lichioiu scored to help advance the team to the championship final. In the championship final, Kingston was defeated by SC Waterloo Region. He finished the season as the team's second-leading goal scorer with 10 goals and was nominated for the league's MVP award.

He re-signed with Kingston for the 2014 season. In his second season with Kingston, he helped the club secure a playoff berth by finishing third in the division. In the playoffs, the team was eliminated in the semifinals by Toronto Croatia.

== Honors ==
Nistru Otaci

- Moldovan Cup: 2004–05

Olimpia Bălți

- Moldovan Cup runner-up: 2010–11

Kingston FC

- Canadian Soccer League First Division: 2013
- CSL Championship runner-up: 2013

Individual

- Moldovan National Division Top Goal Scorer: 2004–05
