= Predrag Papaz =

Bosnian footballer

Personal information
- Date of birth: 20 January 1987 (age 39)
- Place of birth: Sarajevo, SFR Yugoslavia
- Position: Defender

Senior career*
Years	Team	Apps	(Gls)
2006–2007	Slavija Sarajevo	1	(1)
2009–2013	Slavija Sarajevo	53	(3)
2013	SC Waterloo Region		
2014	Burlington SC		
2014–2015	Metalleghe-BSI	7	(0)
2015	Milton SC		
2015–2016	Slavija Sarajevo	5	(0)
2016–2017	GOŠK Gabela		
2017–2018	Bosna Visoko	29	(2)
2018–2019	TOŠK Tešanj	16	(0)
- * Club domestic league appearances and goals

Predrag Papaz (born January 20, 1987) is a Bosnian former footballer who played as a defender.

== Career ==
=== Early career ===
Papaz began his career with Slavija Sarajevo in 2006 and played in the 2007 UEFA Intertoto Cup, a summer continental tournament, against Andorran representative UE Sant Julià. He played abroad in the Czech First League with the reserve squad of FK Jablonec in 2008. In 2009, he returned to his native country of Bosnia to sign with former club FK Slavija Sarajevo in the Premier League of Bosnia and Herzegovina. He would resume playing at the top tier with Sarajevo for three seasons, where he would appear in a total of 44 matches and record one goal.

=== Canada ===
In the summer of 2013, he went abroad for the second time to play in the Canadian Soccer League with SC Waterloo Region. In his debut season with Waterloo, he assisted the club in securing a playoff berth by finishing fifth in the First Division. As a result of qualifying for the postseason, he helped Waterloo win their first championship title by defeating Kingston FC in the CSL Championship final. The following season he signed with league rivals Burlington SC. In his final season in Canada, he signed with newly promoted side Milton SC for the 2015 season.

=== Bosnia ===
After three seasons abroad, he returned to Bosnia to play with NK Metalleghe-BSI in the First League of the Federation of Bosnia and Herzegovina. He returned to the top Bosnian division in 2016 when he returned to his former club, Slavija Sarajevo. Papaz would appear in five matches for Sarajevo throughout the season. His tenure with Slavija was short-lived as he signed with NK GOŠK Gabela in the second tier the following season. He resumed playing in the Bosnia First League with NK Bosna Visoko in late 2016. In his debut season with Bosna, he was named the year's best player. He re-signed with Bosna for the 2017–18 season.

Following his two tenures, with Visoko he received another opportunity to play in the top tier once more when he signed a contract with NK Čelik Zenica in late 2017. After financial disagreements with Zenica, he departed from the club before making his debut. Following his abrupt departure from Zenica, he resumed playing in the second division in 2018, with NK TOŠK Tešanj.

== Honours ==
SC Waterloo Region

- CSL Championship: 2013
