= Canadian Soccer League Awards =

- Awarded for: Several individual performances at the end of the Canadian Soccer League (CSL) season
- Sponsored by: Canadian Soccer League
- Date: Annually (following the season's end)
- Country: Canada
- First award: 1998

The Canadian Soccer League Awards is an annual awards ceremony for several individual performances at the end of the season. The event was established in 1998, when the Canadian National Soccer League merged with the stillborn Ontario Professional Soccer League to form the Canadian Professional Soccer League. The ceremony has been traditionally held at awards banquet at the end of the season with the exception in 2008, 2009, and 2010 where they were given out before the CSL Championship final. In 2010, the league began distributing awards to the Second Division for the first time.

== First Division awards ==
=== Most Valuable Player Award ===
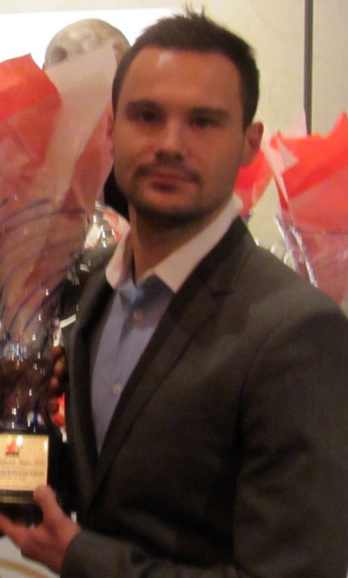
Marin Vučemilović-Grgić won the award in 2012 and 2014 becoming the second Croatian footballer to win the award

The league's MVP award.

Year	Name	Nationality	Club	Ref.
1998	Rene Martin	Canada	North York Astros	
1999	Elvis Thomas	Canada	Toronto Olympians	
2000	Willy Giummarra	Canada	York Region Shooters	
2001	Abraham Osman	Uganda	Ottawa Wizards	
2002	Abraham Osman	Uganda	Ottawa Wizards	
2003	Phil Ionadi	Canada	Brampton Hitmen	
2004	Danny Amaral	Canada	Toronto Supra	
2005	Desmond Humphrey	Canada	Vaughan Shooters	
2006	Saša Viciknez	Serbia	Serbian White Eagles	
2007	Nicolas Lesage	Canada	Trois Rivieres Attak	
2008	Daniel Nascimento	Canada	Brampton Lions	
2009	Saša Viciknez	Serbia	Serbian White Eagles	
2010	Tihomir Maletic	Croatia	Toronto Croatia	
2011	Tihomir Maletic	Croatia	Toronto Croatia	
2012	Marin Vučemilović-Grgić	Croatia	Toronto Croatia	
2013	Guillaume Surot	France	Kingston FC	
2014	Marin Vučemilović-Grgić	Croatia	London City	
2015	Josip Keran	Croatia	Toronto Croatia	

=== Golden Boot Award ===
The Golden Boot is the league's leading scorer.

Year	Name	Nationality	Club	Ref.
1998	Gus Kouzmanis	Canada	Toronto Olympians	
1999	Eddy Berdusco	Canada	Toronto Olympians	
2000	Gus Kouzmanis	Canada	Toronto Olympians	
2001	Kevin Nelson	Trinidad and Tobago	Ottawa Wizards	
2002	Darren Tilley	England	Mississauga Olympians	
2003	Carlo Arghittu	Canada	St. Catharines Wolves	
2004	Paul Munster	Northern Ireland	London City	
2005	Aaron Byrd	USA	Windsor Border Stars	
2006	Gabriel Pop	Romania	Serbian White Eagles	
2007	Nicolas Lesage	Canada	Trois Rivieres Attak	
2008	Daniel Nascimento	Canada	Brampton Lions	
2009	Reda Agourram	Canada	Trois Rivieres Attak	
2010	Tihomir Maletic	Croatia	Toronto Croatia	
2011	Stefan Vukovic	Canada	TFC Academy	
2012	Dražen Vuković	Croatia	SC Waterloo Region	
2013	Guillaume Surot	France	Kingston FC	
2014	Marin Vučemilović-Grgić	Croatia	London City	
2015	Richard West	Jamaica	York Region Shooters	
2016	Sergiy Ivliev	Ukraine	FC Ukraine United	
2017	Aleksandar Stojiljković	Serbia	Scarborough SC	
2018	Sani Dey	Ghana	Hamilton City SC	
2019	Mykola Temniuk	Ukraine	FC Vorkuta	

=== Goalkeeper of the Year Award ===
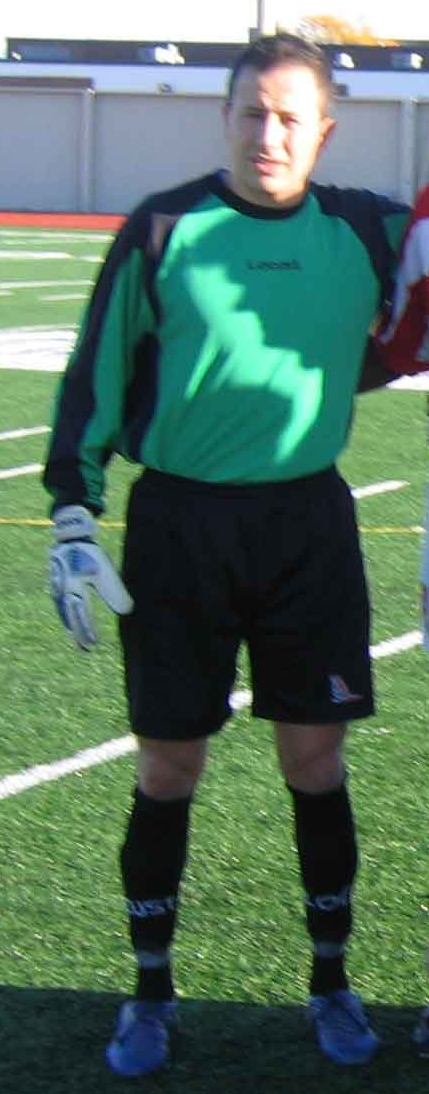
George Azcurra has won the most Goalkeeper of the Year awards with five

Year	Name	Nationality	Club	Ref.
1998	Dino Perri	Canada	St. Catharines Wolves	
1999	George Azcurra	Canada	Toronto Croatia	
2000	Piotr Libicz	Canada	North York Astros	
2001	George Azcurra; Luciano Miranda	Canada; Canada	Toronto Croatia; North York Astros	
2002	George Azcurra	Canada	Toronto Croatia	
2003	Simon Eaddy	New Zealand	Ottawa Wizards	
2004	George Azcurra	Canada	Toronto Croatia	
2005	Haidar Al-Shaïbani	Canada	London City	
2006	George Azcurra	Canada	Toronto Croatia	
2007	Claudio Perri	Canada	St. Catharines Wolves	
2008	Andrew Olivieri	Canada	Trois-Rivières Attak	
2009	Dan Pelc	Canada	Serbian White Eagles	
2010	Milos Kocic	Serbia	Serbian White Eagles	
2011	Scott Cliff	Canada	SC Toronto	
2012	Antonio Ilic	Croatia	Toronto Croatia	
2013	Antonio Ilic	Croatia	Toronto Croatia	
2014	Vladimir Vujasinović	Serbia	Burlington SC	
2015	Andrew Stinger	Canada	Burlington SC	

=== Defender of the Year Award ===
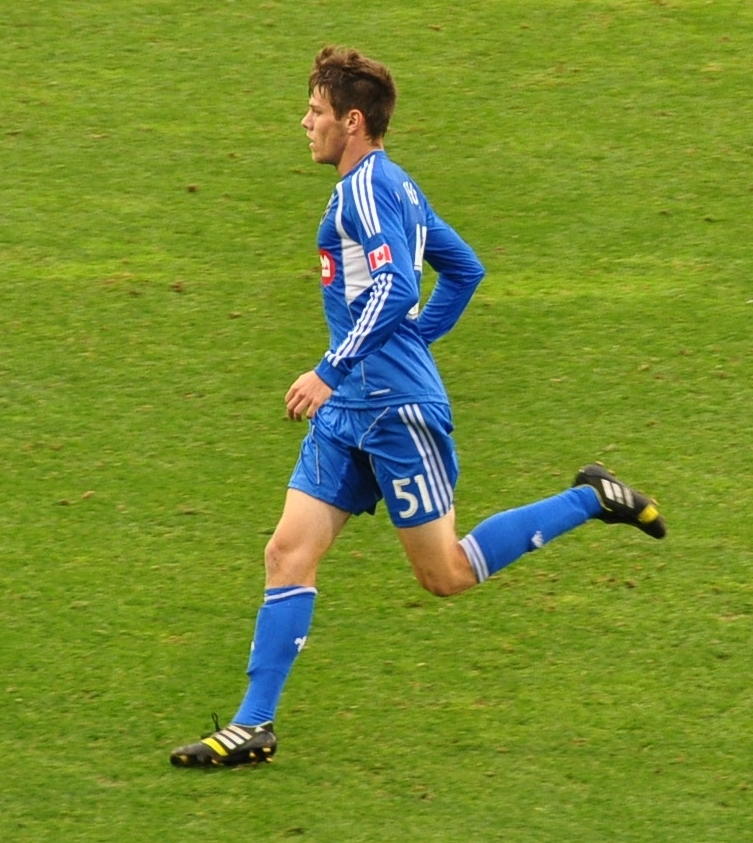
Maxim Tissot won the Defender of the Year in 2012

Year	Name	Nationality	Club	Ref.
2000	Bayete Smith	Canada	Toronto Olympians	
2001	Kurt Ramsey	Canada	North York Astros	
2002	Domagoj Sain	Croatia	Toronto Croatia	
2003	Domagoj Sain	Croatia	Toronto Croatia	
2004	Justin Marshall	Canada	Windsor Border Stars	
2005	Fil Rocca	Canada	Windsor Border Stars	
2006	Fil Rocca	Canada	Windsor Border Stars	
2007	Domagoj Šain	Croatia	Toronto Croatia	
2008	Carlos Zeballos	Uruguay	North York Astros	
2009	Mirko Medic	Serbia	Serbian White Eagles	
2010	Rick Titus	Trinidad and Tobago	York Region Shooters	
2011	Sven Arapovic	Canada	Toronto Croatia	
2012	Maxim Tissot	Canada	Montreal Impact Academy	
2013	Sven Arapovic	Canada	Toronto Croatia	
2014	Josip Keran; Nikola Stanojevic	Croatia; Serbia	Toronto Croatia; Burlington SC	
2015	Nikola Stanojevic	Serbia	Burlington SC	

=== Rookie of the Year Award ===
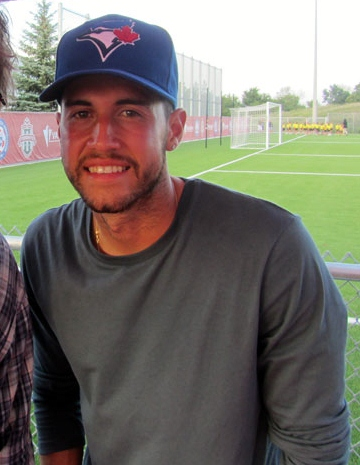
Jonathan Osorio was the CSL Rookie of the Year in 2012

Year	Name	Nationality	Club	Ref.
1998	Tom Bianchi	Canada	London City	
1999	Semir Mesanovic	Canada	London City	
2000	Jimmy Kuzmanovski	Canada	Oshawa Flames	
2001	Kevin Nelson	Trinidad and Tobago	Ottawa Wizards	
2002	Darren Tilley	England	Mississauga Olympians	
2003	McDonald Yobe	Malawi	Ottawa Wizards	
2004	Paul Munster	Northern Ireland	London City	
2005	Dennis Peeters	Canada	London City	
2006	Uarlem Castro	Brazil	Toronto Supra Portuguese	
2007	Tihomir Maletić	Croatia	Toronto Croatia	
2008	Adrian Pena	Canada	TFC Academy	
2009	Reda Agourram	Canada	Trois Rivieres Attak	
2010	Thomas Beattie	England	London City	
2011	Akil DeFreitas	Trinidad and Tobago	Capital City F.C.	
2012	Jonathan Osorio	Canada	SC Toronto	
2013	Guillaume Surot	France	Kingston FC	
2014	Aleksandar Stojiljković	Serbia	SC Waterloo Region	
2015	Ihor Melnyk	Ukraine	Toronto Atomic	

=== Coach of the Year Award ===
Year	Name	Nationality	Club	Ref.
1998	David Gee	England	Toronto Olympians	
1999	David Gee; Tony LaFerrara	England; Canada	Toronto Olympians; London City	
2000	Lucio Ianiero	Canada	St. Catharines Wolves	
2001	Zoran Jankovic	Serbia	Montreal Dynamites	
2002	Aldwyn McGill	Trinidad and Tobago	Metro Lions	
2003	José Testas	Portugal	Toronto Supra	
2004	Pat Hilton	England	Windsor Border Stars	
2005	Dejan Gluščević	Montenegro	North York Astros	
2006	Tony De Thomasis	Italy	Italia Shooters	
2007	James McGilivary	Canada	St. Catharines Wolves	
2008	Rafael Carbajal	Uruguay	North York Astros	
2009	Philippe Eullaffroy	France	Trois Rivieres Attak	
2010	Ron Davidson	Canada	Hamilton Croatia	
2011	Velimir Crljen	Croatia	Toronto Croatia	
2012	Stefano Vagnini	Canada	Windsor Stars	
2013	Colm Muldoon	Ireland	Kingston FC	
2014	Darryl Gomez	Saint Kitts and Nevis	York Region Shooters	
2015	Vasyl Ishchak	Ukraine	Toronto Atomic	

=== Harry Paul Gauss Memorial Award ===
First introduced in 2004 as the CPSL President's Award, but was renamed in 2006 in honor of Harry Gauss. The award is presented to the individual who has shown allegiance, commitment and support to the league and its member clubs.

Year	Name	Nationality	Club	Ref.
2004	Bruno Ierullo	Argentina	North York Astros	
2005	Tony De Thomasis	Italy	Vaughan Shooters	
2006	Isac Cambas	Canada	Toronto Supra Portuguese	
2007	Bruno Ierullo	Argentina	North York Astros	
2009	Armand Di Fruscio	Canada	St. Catharines Wolves	
2010	Tony De Thomasis	Italy	York Region Shooters	
2011	Joe Pavicic	Croatia	Toronto Croatia	
2012	Ryan Gauss	Canada	London City	
2013	Pino Jazbec	Canada	CSL League Administrator	
2014	Phil Ionadi	Canada	CSL Director for Youth	
2015	Cyndy De Thomasis	Canada	York Region Shooters	

=== Referee of the Year Award ===
The Referee of the Year award is voted on by the CSL Referee Committee.

Year	Name	Nationality	Ref.
1998	Bill Teeuwen	Canada	
1999	Silviu Petrescu	Romania	
2000	Steve Cahoon	Canada	
2001	Amato De Luca	Canada	
2002	Michael Lambert	Canada	
2003	Michael Lambert	Canada	
2004	Amato De Luca	Canada	
2005	Andre Jasinski	Canada	
2006	Mercey Watfa	Canada	
2007	Joe Fletcher	Canada	
2008	Isaac Raymond	England	
2009	Justin Tasev	Canada	
2010	Geoff Gamble	Canada	
2011	David Barrie	Canada	
2012	David Barrie	Canada	
2013	Justin Tasev	Canada	
2014	Marco Jaramillo	Canada	
2015	Goran Babic	Serbia	

=== Fair Play and Respect Award ===
The Fair Play and Respect Award is awarded to the club which, in the opinion of the CSL Discipline Committee, has demonstrated good discipline on the field of play and has exhibited a high level of respect for the game officials in the regular playing season

Year	Name	Ref.
1998	London City	
1999	Toronto Olympians	
2000	Toronto Olympians	
2001	Durham Flames	
2002	Mississauga Olympians	
2003	Durham Flames	
2004	Durham Storm	
2005	North York Astros	
2006	Caribbean Selects	
2007	Trois-Rivières Attak	
2008	Trois-Rivières Attak	
2009	TFC Academy	
2010	TFC Academy	
2011	Niagara United	
2012	TFC Academy	
2013	SC Waterloo Region	
2014	Kingston FC	
2015	Burlington SC	

=== Media and Broadcaster Award ===
The Media and Broadcaster Award is awarded to the individuals who have shown interest and loyalty in reporting CSL news and matches.

Year	Name	Role	Ref.
2011	Jeremy Milani	Television producer for Rogers TV.	
2012	Robin Glover	Covering and providing game reports for the CNSL, CPSL and the CSL since 1995.	
2012	Enio Perruzza	For announcing CNSL, CPSL and the CSL matches for 26 years.	

== Second Division awards ==
=== Most Valuable Player Award ===
The league's MVP award.

Year	Name	Nationality	Club	Ref.
2010	Sergio Camargo	Canada	TFC Academy II	
2011	Jorgo Nika	Canada	SC Toronto B	
2012	Gino Berardi	Canada	Windsor Stars B	
2013	Younan Samara	Iraq	London City B	
2014	Mademba Ba	Senegal	Kingston FC B	
2015	Arsenije Japalak	Croatia	Brantford Galaxy B	

=== Golden Boot Award ===
Year	Name	Nationality	Club	Ref.
2010	Wesley Cain; Jonathan Singh	Canada; Canada	Portugal FC B Brampton Lions B	
2011	Jorgo Nika	Canada	SC Toronto B	
2012	Gino Berardi	Canada	Windsor Stars B	
2013	Mademba Ba	Senegal	Kingston FC B	
2014	Mademba Ba	Senegal	Kingston FC B	
2015	Nikola Miokovic	Canada	Burlington SC B	
2016	Mohammad-Ali Heydarpour	Canada	SC Waterloo Region	
2017	Taras Hromyak	Ukraine	FC Ukraine United	
2018	Kristijan Kezic	Croatia	FC Vorkuta B	

=== Goalkeeper of the Year Award ===
Year	Name	Nationality	Club	Ref.
2010	Jesse Castillo	Canada	Brantford Galaxy B	
2011	Ryan Pumier	Canada	Kitchener Waterloo United FC	
2012	Mark Rogal	Canada	TFC Academy II	
2013	Roy Seaboyer	Canada	Brampton United B	
2014	Adrian Ibanez	CAN	York Region Shooters B	
2015	Ihor Vitiv	Ukraine	Toronto Atomic B	

=== Defender of the Year Award ===
Year	Name	Nationality	Club	Ref.
2010	David Ferreira	Canada	Brampton Lions B	
2011	Oliver Spring	Canada	SC Toronto B	
2012	Malcolm Mings	Canada	Niagara United B	
2013	Daniel Stoker	Canada	Toronto Croatia B	
2014	Danilo Richards	CAN	Burlington SC B	
2015	Namanjar Sudar	Canada	Brantford Galaxy B	

=== Rookie of the Year Award ===
Year	Name	Nationality	Club	Ref.
2010	Sergio Camargo	Canada	TFC Academy II	
2011	Jeremy Caranci	Canada	London City B	
2012	Mark Wadid	Canada	TFC Academy II	
2013	Mykola Chachula	Canada	Toronto Croatia B	
2014	Nikola Miokovic	CAN	SC Waterloo Region B	
2015	Kingma Zach	Canada	Brantford Galaxy B	

=== Coach of the Year Award ===
Year	Name	Nationality	Club	Ref.
2010	Michael DI Matteo	Canada	Brampton Lions B	
2011	James McGillivray	Canada	Niagara United	
2012	James McGillivray	Canada	Niagara United B	
2013	George Jenkins	Canada	Toronto Croatia B	
2014	Thomas Moran	Canada	Kingston FC B	
2015	Amir Osmanlic	Bosnia and Herzegovina	Milton SC B	

== Awards by club ==
Rank	Club	Total
1	Toronto Croatia	24
2	London City	14
3	Toronto Olympians	13
4	York Region Shooters	12
5	North York Astros	10
6	TFC Academy	9
6	SC Toronto	9
6	Kingston FC	9
7	Trois Rivieres Attak	8
7	Windsor Stars	8
8	Brampton United	7
8	Burlington SC	7
9	Serbian White Eagles	6
9	St. Catharines Wolves	6
9	Ottawa Wizards	6
9	SC Waterloo	5
10	Brantford Galaxy	4
10	Niagara United	4
11	Toronto Atomic	3
11	Durham Flames	3
12	FC Ukraine United	2
12	FC Vorkuta	2
13	Brampton Hitmen	1
13	Capital City F.C.	1
13	Caribbean Selects	1
13	Hamilton Croatia	1
13	Hamilton City SC	1
13	Milton SC	1
13	Montreal Dynamites	1
13	Montreal Impact Academy	1
13	Scarborough SC	1
13	York Region Shooters	1
Total		180
