= Guillaume Surot =

French footballer (born 1988)

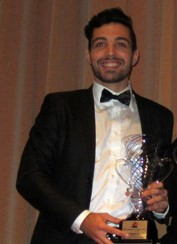
- Surot in 2013

Personal information
- Date of birth: April 3, 1988 (age 38)
- Place of birth: Cholet, Pays de la Loire, France
- Position: Forward

College career
Years	Team	Apps	(Gls)
2011–2012	UQTR Patriotes		

Senior career*
Years	Team	Apps	(Gls)
2009–2013	Cholet	1	(0)
2013–2014	Kingston FC	32	(40)
2014	London City	3	(0)
2015–2016	Lesquin		
2016–2017	Saint-Amand FC		
2017–2018	Tourcoing	9	(1)
2018–2020	Stade Montois	38	(13)
- * Club domestic league appearances and goals as of 3 August 2023

Guillaume Surot (born April 3, 1988) is a former French footballer who played as a forward.

== Club career ==
=== Early career ===
Surot initially began his career in 2009 by signing with his hometown club SO Cholet. He would make an appearance for the club during the 2012–13 season in the Championnat National 3.

In 2011, he played abroad in the Canadian province of Quebec and transitioned into the college level by enrolling in the Université du Québec à Trois-Rivières and participating in the university soccer program. Surot would receive the rookie of the year in his debut season. In his return season with the Patriotes, he helped the team secure the provincial title which qualified for the national championship. Surot would contribute two goals in the opening round of the tournament where the Patriotes would successfully defeat the Alberta Golden Bears. After losing the semifinal match, the Patriotes defeated Laval Rouge et Or for the bronze medal where Surot recorded the winning goal. He would also be named to the national championship all-star team.

=== Canada ===
In the summer of 2013, he returned to the professional scene by playing in the interprovincial Canadian Soccer League with Kingston FC. He would record his first goal for the club in the season opener on May 5, 2013, against Brampton City United. Throughout the season, he assisted the club in producing a 6 game-undefeated streak at home. Following their initial undefeated streak, Kingston produced another 11-match undefeated streak and would ultimately secure the First Division title. Surot would finish the season as the league's leading scorer with 28 goals. In the preliminary round of the postseason, Kingston would defeat the Serbian White Eagles. In the semifinal round, he contributed two goals against London City, which advanced the club to the championship final. However, in the championship final match, the divisional champions were defeated by SC Waterloo Region. Surot would receive further accolades for his productive season as he was also named the league's MVP and rookie of the year.

After the conclusion of the season, he was invited for a trial with the Ottawa Fury of the North American Soccer League. Following his successful debut season, he re-signed with Kingston for the 2014 season. His second season with Kingston was brief as he was traded to London City before the roster freeze on September 1, 2014. London would primarily battle with Brampton United for the final playoff berth in the division, with London ultimately failing to secure the final spot. Surot would finish the 2014 campaign third in the scoring charts with 12 goals.

=== France ===
Surot returned to his native France in 2015 to play at the local regional level with US Lesquin. After a season with Lesquin, he moved on to play with Saint-Amand. In 2017, he returned to the National 3 circuit to sign with US Tourcoing. In his debut season with Tourcoing, he appeared in 9 matches and scored 1 goal. After several seasons in the northern regions of France, he signed with Stade Montois for the 2018–17 season in the Championnat National 2. In his debut season in the fourth tier, he played in 25 games and recorded 4 goals. He re-signed with Stade Montois the following season, but midway through the season, he departed from the club. In his second season with the club, he played in the 2019–20 Coupe de France against Trélissac.

== Personal life ==
He is married to Camille Aubert a French basketball player.

== Career statistics ==
Club	Season	League			Playoffs		Domestic Cup		League Cup		Total	
Club	Season	League	Apps	Goals	Apps	Goals	Apps	Goals	Apps	Goals	Apps	Goals
SO Cholet	2012–13	Championnat National 3	1	0	—		0	0	0	0	1	0
Kingston FC	2013	Canadian Soccer League (First Division)	21	28	3	2	—		—		24	30
Kingston FC	2014	Canadian Soccer League (First Division)	11	12	0	0	—		—		11	12
London City	2014	Canadian Soccer League (First Division)	3	0	0	0	—		—		3	0
US Tourcoing	2017–18	Championnat National 3	9	1	—		0	0	0	0	9	1
Stade Montois	2018–19	Championnat National 2	25	4	—		—		0	0	25	4
Stade Montois	2019–20	Championnat National 3	13	9	—		1	0	0	0	14	9
Career totals			83	54	3	2	1	0	0	0	87	56

== Honours ==
Kingston FC

- Canadian Soccer League First Division: 2013
- CSL Championship runner-up: 2013

UQTR Patriotes

- Réseau du sport étudiant du Québec: 2012

Individual

- CSL Golden Boot: 2013
- CSL MVP: 2013
