= Haris Fazlagić =

Bosnian-Herzegovinian footballer

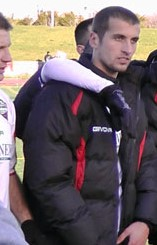
- Fazlagić in 2010

Personal information
- Date of birth: 5 April 1987 (age 39)
- Place of birth: Sarajevo, SFR Yugoslavia
- Position: Midfielder

Senior career*
Years	Team	Apps	(Gls)
2010	Brantford Galaxy		
2010–2011	Banat Zrenjanin	2	(0)
2011–2012	FK Famos Hrasnica		
2012–2014	SC Waterloo Region		
2012–2013	Slavija Sarajevo	14	(0)
2013–2014	Travnik	3	(0)
2014	London City		
2015	Brantford Galaxy		
2015–2016	Bosna Visoko	5	(0)
2016	Hamilton City		
2016	Milton SC		
2017	Scarborough SC		
2019	Hamilton City		
- * Club domestic league appearances and goals

Haris Fazlagić (born April 5, 1987) is a former Bosnian-Herzegovinian footballer who played as a midfielder.

== Club career ==
=== Early career ===
Fazlagić played at the youth level with Zeljeznicar.

In late 2010, he played abroad in the Canadian Soccer League with the expansion franchise Brantford Galaxy. In his debut season with Brantford, he assisted the club in securing a playoff berth by finishing seventh in the First Division. He participated in the CSL Championship final against Hamilton Croatia, where he contributed two goals to secure the title for Brantford.

=== Bosnia ===
In 2011, he returned to Serbia to play in the Serbian First League with Banat Zrenjanin. He made his debut for Banat on March 12, 2011, against Mladost Lucani. In total, he would play in two matches in the Serbian second tier. Following his short stint in Serbia, he played with Famos Hrasnica in the First League of the Federation of Bosnia and Herzegovina.

=== Canada ===
After two years in Europe, he returned to the CSL to sign with another expansion franchise, SC Waterloo Region. In the winter of 2012, he returned to Bosnia to play in the country's top league the Premier League of Bosnia and Herzegovina, with Slavija Sarajevo. He would appear in 14 matches with Sarajevo. After the conclusion of the season, he departed from Sarajevo with the original intention to sign with London City.

Instead, he would sign with his former club, Waterloo, for the remainder of the 2013 season. He played in the opening round of the 2013 playoffs, where he recorded a goal against Brampton City United, which advanced the club to the next round. He would make his second championship final appearance, where he contributed a goal against Kingston FC to secure the title for Waterloo.

=== Return to Bosnia ===
After the conclusion of the 2013 CSL season, he returned to play in Bosnia's top tier with Travnik. Following his short stay in Europe, he returned to Waterloo for the 2014 season. Midway through the 2014 season, he was transferred to league rivals London City before the roster freeze on September 1, 2014. For the 2015 season, he remained in the CSL by returning to play with his former club, Brantford Galaxy. In early 2016, he had another stint in the Bosnian second tier with NK Bosna Visoko.

=== CSL ===
For the remainder of the 2016 season, his time was split between Hamilton City and later was traded to Milton SC. In 2017, he signed for Scarborough SC, where he recorded the winning goal against FC Vorkuta in the semifinal match in the playoffs. He made his third championship appearance as he recorded a goal against York Region Shooters, which sent the match to overtime, where Scarborough was defeated in a penalty shootout.

In 2019, he played with his former club Hamilton City. Hamilton qualified for the playoffs where they were eliminated in the quarterfinal round by Ukraine United.

== Honours ==
Brantford Galaxy

- CSL Championship: 2010

SC Waterloo Region

- CSL Championship: 2013

Scarborough SC

- CSL Championship runner-up: 2017
