= Colm Muldoon =

Irish footballer

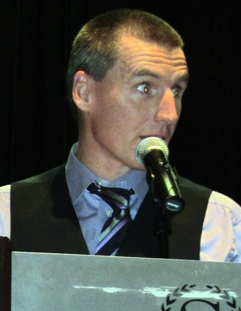
- Muldoon in 2013

Personal information
- Place of birth: Athlone, Republic of Ireland
- Position: Defender

Senior career*
Years	Team	Apps	(Gls)
1991–1996	Athlone Town		

Managerial career
- 2009: Athlone Town U20
- 2012–2014: Kingston FC
- * Club domestic league appearances and goals

Colm Muldoon is an Irish former footballer who played as a defender and was a football manager.

== Club career ==
Muldoon played in the League of Ireland Premier Division during the 1991–92 season with Athlone Town. Following the relegation of Athlone to the Irish first division, he remained with the team for the 1992–93 season. In 1994, Athlone secured a promotion to the premier league. and Muldoon re-signed with the club to compete in the top-tier league. He had another run in the Irish top tier with Athlone during the 1995–96 season.

== Managerial career ==
In 2009, his former club, Athlone Town, named him their manager for the under-20 team in the League of Ireland U20 Division. After a three-month stint with Athlone, he departed from the club. Muldoon ventured abroad to the United States to manage the Middle Georgia State University soccer program.

In the summer of 2012, he joined Kingston FC of the Canadian Soccer League as the club's head coach, replacing Jimmy Hamrouni midway through the season. Kingston would finish the season in the fourteenth spot in the league's first division. Muldoon re-signed with Kingston the following season and began refining the roster with a mixture of imports and university players. Kingston produced a six-game undefeated streak and held the top position in the earlier stages of the season. Following their initial undefeated streak, Kingston produced another 11-match undefeated streak and would ultimately secure the league's first division title. Kingston defeated the Serbian White Eagles in the preliminary round of the playoffs. He led Kingston to the championship final in the semifinal round by defeating London City. However, in the championship match, the divisional champions were defeated by SC Waterloo Region. Muldoon was awarded the league's Coach of the Year for his achievements throughout the season.

Muldoon returned to manage Kingston for the 2014 season. In his third season with Kingston, he secured another playoff berth by finishing third in the division. In the opening round of the post-season, the club was defeated by the Serbian White Eagles. Their playoff journey concluded in the next round after a defeat by Toronto Croatia.

== Honors ==
=== Manager ===
Kingston FC

- Canadian Soccer League First Division: 2013
- CSL Championship runner-up: 2013

Individual

- Canadian Soccer League Coach of the Year: 2013
