= Adis Hasečić =

Bosnian footballer

Personal information
- Date of birth: 4 January 1989 (age 37)
- Place of birth: Sarajevo, SFR Yugoslavia
- Position: Midfielder

Senior career*
| Years | Team | Apps | (Gls) |
| 2008–2009 | Famos Hrasnica | | |
| 2009–2010 | Olimpik | 2 | (0) |
| 2012–2014 | SC Waterloo Region | | |
| 2013–2015 | Travnik | 20 | (3) |
| 2015 | SC Waterloo Region | 21 | (16) |
| 2015–2016 | Bosna Visoko | 5 | (1) |
| 2016 | Scarborough SC | 20 | (11) |
| 2017–2019 | SC Waterloo Region | | |
| 2022– | SV der Bosnier | 53 | (52) |
- * Club domestic league appearances and goals as of 1 March 2024

Adis Hasečić (born March 11, 1987) is a Bosnian footballer who plays as a midfielder for SV der Bosnier.

== Playing career ==
=== Early career ===
Hasečić played with FK Famos Hrasnica in 2008. He played in the country's top tier the Premier League of Bosnia and Herzegovina with FK Olimpik the following season. In his debut season in Sarajevo, he would play in two matches.

=== Waterloo Region ===
In 2012, he played abroad in the Canadian Soccer League with SC Waterloo Region. He debuted on May 20, 2012, against London City and recorded two goals. He re-signed with Waterloo for the 2013 season. Hasečić would have a productive sophomore season with Waterloo, where he finished as the club's top goal scorer with 17 goals. The club would also secure a postseason berth by finishing fifth in the league's first division. In the opening round of the playoffs, he contributed a goal against Brampton United, which helped advance the club to the next round. Hasečić successfully contributed a penalty goal in the second round, where Waterloo defeated Toronto Croatia in a penalty shootout. He participated in the CSL Championship final, where Waterloo defeated divisional champions Kingston FC for the title.

After the conclusion of the Bosnian football season, he returned to Waterloo for the summer of 2014. He helped the club secure a post-season berth and played in the quarterfinal match of the playoffs against Toronto Croatia, where Waterloo was eliminated from the competition. After another season abroad, Hasečić returned to Waterloo for his fourth consecutive season in the summer of 2015. He finished as the club's top goal scorer with 16 goals and assisted in securing a playoff berth. In the preliminary round of the playoffs, he scored the final goal against Toronto Atomic, which advanced Waterloo to the next round. He would contribute another goal in the second round against the Serbian White Eagles, which clinched another championship final appearance. In the championship final, Toronto Croatia defeated Waterloo.

=== Bosnia ===
In early 2014, he returned to Bosnia's premier league to sign with Travnik. Throughout the season, he played in 10 matches and recorded two goals. He re-signed with Travnik for the 2014–15 season. In his final season in the top flight, he appeared in 10 matches and recorded one goal. His lone goal for Travnik occurred on May 15, 2015, against Zvijezda Gradačac. In 2015, he played in the First League of the Federation of Bosnia and Herzegovina with Bosna Visoko.

=== Later career ===
After the relegation of Waterloo to the Second Division, he signed with league rivals Scarborough SC in 2016. In his debut season with Scarborough, he finished as the club's top goal scorer with 11 goals. He returned to the Waterloo Region when the club was promoted to the league's first division in 2017. The 2018 season would mark his sixth season with the Waterloo organization, and he would assist the club in securing a playoff berth by finishing third. They defeated the Serbs in the quarterfinals but were eliminated in the semifinals by Vorkuta in a penalty shootout.

He returned for his seventh and final season with Waterloo in the 2019 season. Hasečić would help Waterloo secure a playoff berth by finishing fourth in the division. Their opponents in the quarterfinal round were the Serbs, with Waterloo advancing after defeating them in a penalty shootout. Waterloo's playoff journey would conclude in the following round after a defeat to Ukraine United.

In 2022, he returned to Europe to play in the German Verbandsliga Hessen-Süd with SV der Bosnier. In his debut season in the Verbandsliga, he appeared in 5 matches and recorded 4 goals. He re-signed for his third season with Bosnier in 2023 and was appointed the team captain.

== Honours ==
SC Waterloo Region

- CSL Championship: 2013
- CSL Championship runner-up: 2015
