= Jake Inglis =

Canadian soccer player

Personal information
- Date of birth: August 16, 1989 (age 37)
- Place of birth: Kitchener, Ontario, Canada
- Position: Defender

Youth career
- Kitchener Spirit
- Etobicoke Energy
- 2006–2007: Inverness Caledonian Thistle

Senior career*
Years	Team	Apps	(Gls)
2008–2009	Brora Rangers		
2009–2011	Elgin City	30	(1)
2012–2015	SC Waterloo Region		
- * Club domestic league appearances and goals

Jake Inglis (born August 16, 1989) is a Canadian former soccer player who played as a defender.

== Youth career ==
Inglis played his youth soccer in his native Kitchener area with the Kitchener Spirit. In 1999, he traveled with the under-11 team to Kingston, where Kitchener won the under-11 Ambassador Cup. He played high school soccer at Resurrection Catholic Secondary School. In the 2005 season, he helped his high school team win the District 8 title and was named to the district's all-star team. Inglis also began playing with Etobicoke Energy to compete in the 2005 under-17 Ontario Cup tournament. In his senior year with Resurrection, the team reached the final of the 2006 Phoenix Cup, where Holy Cross of Woodbridge defeated them in a penalty shootout. He was also named to the 2006 District 8 all-star team.

== Club career ==
=== Scotland ===
After graduating from Resurrection Catholic Secondary School, he ventured abroad by securing an under-19 contract with the Scottish side Inverness Caledonian Thistle. In 2008, he joined Brora Rangers and played in the 2008–09 Scottish Cup.

He played in the Scottish Third Division with Elgin City the following season. Inglis made 14 appearances in his debut season. He re-signed with Elgin for the following campaign. In his final season in the Scottish circuit, he made 16 appearances and recorded 1 goal. After two seasons in northern Scotland, he left the club in the summer of 2011.

=== Canada ===
In the summer of 2012, he returned to Canada to play in the Southern Ontario-based Canadian Soccer League with SC Waterloo Region. He rejoined Waterloo for the 2013 season. In his second season in the Canadian circuit, he helped Waterloo secure a playoff berth in the league's first division. Waterloo's opponents in the opening round were Brampton City United, which they advanced to the next round. The club advanced to the championship final by defeating Toronto Croatia in the following round. Inglis participated in the championship match, where Waterloo defeated Kingston FC for the title.

In 2014, he re-signed with Waterloo for a two-year contract. He helped Waterloo secure another playoff berth throughout the 2014 campaign. The club's playoff journey concluded in the preliminary round after a defeat by Toronto Croatia. His final season with Waterloo was in 2015. He aided the club by securing their third consecutive postseason berth. In the playoff quarterfinal round, Waterloo defeated Toronto Atomic. Waterloo qualified for the championship final by eliminating the Serbian White Eagles. In the finals, they were defeated by Toronto Croatia.

== Personal life ==
His cousin Zachary Ellis-Hayden was also a professional soccer player.

== Career statistics ==
=== Club ===
Club	Season	League			Domestic Cup		League Cup		Continental		Total	
Club	Season	Division	Apps	Goals	Apps	Goals	Apps	Goals	Apps	Goals	Apps	Goals
Elgin City	2009–10	Scottish Football League Third Division	14	0	1	0	0	0	0	0	15	0
Elgin City	2010–11	Scottish Football League Third Division	16	1	0	0	2	0	0	0	17	1
Career total			30	1	1	0	2	0	0	0	33	1

== Honors ==
SC Waterloo Region

- CSL Championship: 2013
- CSL Championship runner-up: 2015
