= Yacine Ait-Slimane =

Canadian soccer player

Personal information
- Date of birth: May 30, 1995 (age 31)
- Place of birth: Sainte-Thérèse, Quebec, Canada
- Height: 1.72 m (5 ft 8 in)
- Position: Forward

Youth career
- 2001–2004: FC Ecublens
- 2004–2007: AS Saint-Lambert
- 2007–2012: Longueuil
- 2012–2015: Montreal Impact

College career
Years	Team	Apps	(Gls)
2017–2022	Concordia Stingers		

Senior career*
Years	Team	Apps	(Gls)
2014	Montreal Impact U23	11	(1)
2015–2016	FC Montreal	30	(1)

International career
- Canada U18
- * Club domestic league appearances and goals

Yacine Ait-Slimane (born May 30, 1995) is a Canadian soccer player who played as a forward.

== Club career ==
=== Early career ===
Ait-Slimane began playing football as a 5-year-old with FC Ecublenbs Vaud in Switzerland, before returning to Canada with AS Saint-Lambert for 3 years. He then played with Longueuil's academy in 2007. In 2009, while playing with Longueuil he was named the league's best player and top goal scorer.

He joined the Montreal Impact's academy team in the Canadian Soccer League's first division in 2012. He would help Montreal secure another playoff berth by finishing second in the division. In the first round of the playoffs, they defeated Toronto FC's academy. Ait-Slimane would contribute a goal in the semifinal round against the York Region Shooters and helped advance Montreal to the championship final. In the championship title match, the team was defeated by Toronto Croatia. After the conclusion of the season, he was nominated for the league's rookie of the year.

In 2013, when Montreal left the CSL circuit he resumed playing with the academy side in the U.S. Soccer Development Academy. He would also feature with Montreal Impact's reserve team in the MLS Reserve League. His final run with the academy was during the 2014 season when the team competed in the American-based USL Premier Development League.

=== FC Montreal ===
On March 13, 2015, it was announced that Ait-Slimane would join FC Montreal, a USL affiliate club of the Montreal Impact for their inaugural season. He made his professional debut for the club on March 28 in a 2–0 defeat to Toronto FC II. He would record his first goal for the club on August 9, 2015, against Saint Louis. In his debut season, he played in 11 matches and scored 1 goal.

Ait-Slimane would re-sign with Montreal the following season. The club would fail to qualify for the postseason. In total, he played in 19 matches.

=== Concordia ===
After two seasons with Montreal, he began playing at the college level with the Concordia Stingers. In his third season, he was named to the first all-star team. The following season, he was named the athlete of the week in September. His final season with Concordia was in the 2021-2022 season.

== International career ==
Born in Canada, Ait-Slimane is of Algerian descent. He was initially selected for the Canada under-18 national team camp in 2012. He was called up once again to the under-18 national team camp in 2012. He received his third invitation to the national youth team camp in 2013.

== Honors ==
Montreal Impact Academy

- CSL Championship Runners-up: 2012
