= Dražen Vuković =

Croatian footballer

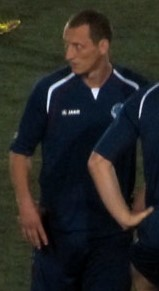
- Vuković in 2013

Personal information
- Date of birth: 14 December 1981 (age 44)
- Place of birth: Slavonski Brod, SFR Yugoslavia
- Position: Forward

Youth career
- Hajduk Split

Senior career*
| Years | Team | Apps | (Gls) |
| 2006–2007 | Zadar | 8 | (1) |
| 2007–2008 | Slavonac CO | 13 | (4) |
| 2008–2009 | Junak Sinj | 18 | (5) |
| 2009–2010 | Solin | 10 | (2) |
| 2010 | Brantford Galaxy | | |
| 2010–2011 | Junak Sinj | 8 | (2) |
| 2011–2012 | Solin | 10 | (2) |
| 2012 | Hrvace | 3 | (0) |
| 2012–2015 | SC Waterloo Region | | |
| 2013 | Junak Sinj | 7 | (0) |
| 2016 | Hamilton City | | |
| 2017 | SC Waterloo Region | | |
- * Club domestic league appearances and goals

Dražen Vuković (born December 14, 1981) is a Croatian former footballer who played as a forward.

== Club career ==
=== Croatia ===
Vuković played at the youth level with Hajduk Split, where he appeared in 11 friendly matches. In 2006, he played in the Croatian Second Football League with NK Zadar and departed from the club the following season. He would make 8 appearances and record 1 goal in his professional debut season. He remained in the second tier by signing with NK Slavonac CO in 2008 in his native region of Slavonia. After a season in Slavonia, he signed with Junak Sinj and received the Dite Maligana award in his debut season. He continued his journeyman career in the second division by signing with NK Solin for the 2009-10 season.

=== Brantford ===
In 2010, he played abroad in the Canadian Soccer League with the expansion side Brantford Galaxy. He made his debut for the club on May 16, 2010, against Portugal FC, where he recorded a goal. Vuković assisted the club in achieving its first victory against Toronto Croatia. After an impressive start with Brantford, he was invited along with teammate Miodrag Anđelković to train with Toronto FC of the Major League Soccer. His trial run with TFC resulted in an appearance in a friendly match against Bolton Wanderers F.C. Unfortunately, his season was cut short as he received an injury around August 2010. Brantford would go on to claim the CSL Championship after defeating Hamilton Croatia.

=== Return to Croatia ===
After a short stint in North America, he returned to Croatia in late 2010 to rejoin his former club Junak Sinj. In 2011, he competed once more in the second tier with his former club NK Solin. In his second tenure with Solin, he appeared in 10 matches and recorded 2 goals. Following a two-year stint in the Croatian second division, he played in the Croatian Third Football League in 2012 with NK Hrvace.

He would appear on the Croatian football scene one final time in the winter of 2013 after the conclusion of the 2012 CSL season to sign with former club Junak Sinj. In his final season in the second tier, he appeared in 7 matches.

=== Waterloo ===
He returned to Canada in 2012 to sign with SC Waterloo Region in the league's first division. Vuković recorded his first pair of goals for Waterloo on May 30, 2012, against London City. In his debut season, he finished as the league's top goal scorer with 20 goals. Waterloo would fail to secure the final playoff berth by two points.

After spending the winter months in Europe, he re-signed with Waterloo for the 2013 season. He finished the season with 15 goals in 25 matches. He helped Waterloo secure a postseason berth and recorded a goal in the opening round of the playoffs against Brampton United, which advanced the club to the next round. In the semifinals, he recorded the tying goal against Toronto Croatia, where Waterloo won the match in a penalty shootout. He started in the championship final match against Kingston FC, where Waterloo successfully secured the title.

He returned for his third season in 2014. The club successfully qualified for the playoffs but was eliminated in the opening round to Toronto Croatia. For the 2015 season, he was named the team captain for Waterloo. The team reached the championship final but was defeated by Toronto Croatia. In 2016, Waterloo was relegated to the league's second division, which resulted in Vuković signing with league rivals Hamilton City. Hamilton reached the championship final but was defeated by the Serbian White Eagles. In 2017, he returned for his final season with Waterloo when the club was promoted back to the first division.

== Honors ==
Brantford Galaxy

- CSL Championship: 2010

Hamilton City

- CSL Championship runner-up: 2016

SC Waterloo Region

- CSL Championship: 2013

Individual

- CSL Golden Boot: 2012
