= Nemanja Simeunović =

Serbian footballer

Personal information
- Full name: Nemanja Simeunović
- Date of birth: September 21, 1984 (age 42)
- Place of birth: Valjevo, SFR Yugoslavia
- Position: Defender

Senior career*
Years	Team	Apps	(Gls)
2006–2007	Srem	3	(0)
2007	Bežanija	0	(0)
2008	Hajduk Beograd	15	(2)
2010–2011	Novi Sad	30	(1)
2012–2015	Waterloo		
2016–2020	Scarborough		
2020	Serbian White Eagles		
- * Club domestic league appearances and goals

Nemanja Simeunović (Serbian Cyrillic: Немања Симеуновић; born September 21, 1984) is a Serbian retired footballer.

== Playing career ==
Simeunović played with FK Srem in the 2006–07 Serbian First League. In early 2008, he signed with FK Hajduk Beograd of the Serbian First League. In 2010, he was transferred to FK Novi Sad and featured in 30 matches and recorded one goal. In 2012, he went overseas to Canada to sign with SC Waterloo Region of the Canadian Soccer League. In the 2013 season he helped Waterloo secure a postseason berth by finishing fifth in the overall standings. He featured in the CSL Championship match against Kingston FC, and secured the club's first championship by a score of 3-1. In the 2015 season the club finished fourth in the standings and secure a postseason berth. He featured in the Championship match against Toronto Croatia, but lost the match by a score of 1-0. In 2016, after the relegation of SC Waterloo he signed with Scarborough SC.
