= Taylor Benjamin =

Guyanese footballer

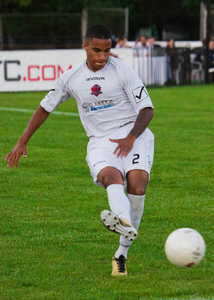
- Benjamin with Capital City in 2011

Personal information
- Date of birth: March 27, 1990 (age 36)
- Place of birth: Etobicoke, Ontario, Canada
- Height: 5 ft 10 in (1.78 m)
- Position: Defender

Youth career
- 2009–2010: Algonquin Thunder

Senior career*
Years	Team	Apps	(Gls)
2011–2012	Capital City	20	(0)
2013	Kingston	1	(0)
2014	London City		
2014–2015	Morvant Caledonia United	4	(1)
2014–2015	North East Stars		
2015–2016	SV Fortuna Regensburg	26	(0)
2016–2017	SG Bogen	5	(0)
2016–2017	TSV Bogen	10	(0)
2016–2017	SV Neukirchen Hl. Blut	11	(1)
2017–2018	SV Fortuna Regensburg	17	(1)

International career^{‡}
2011–2012	Guyana	8	(0)
- * Club domestic league appearances and goals as of March 19, 2020 ‡ National team caps and goals as of February 21, 2012

Taylor Benjamin (born March 27, 1990) is a former footballer. Born in Canada, he represented the Guyana national team.

== College and amateur career ==
Born in Etobicoke, Ontario, Canada, Benjamin attended Woodroffe High School in Ottawa, Ontario from 2004 to 2008, played youth soccer with Ottawa Royals S.C. and FC Outaouais. He played one year of OCAA soccer at Algonquin College. After one season, he moved to Limeira, Brazil to play for Associação Atlética Internacional.

== Professional career ==
Benjamin signed his first professional contract when he signed for Capital City F.C. in the Canadian Soccer League (CSL) on May 18, 2011. He made his professional debut on May 20, 2011, in a 2–0 loss to Toronto Croatia. In 2013, he signed with Kingston FC, and assisted in securing the First Division title. He featured in the CSL Championship finals with Kingston, but fell short after losing to SC Waterloo Region. In 2014, he played abroad in the TT Pro League with Morvant Caledonia United, and later was transferred to North East Stars.

In 2015, he returned to the CSL to play with London City. For the remainder of the season he played abroad in the Landesliga Bayern-Mitte with SV Fortuna Regensburg. He had a brief stint in the A-Klasse Bogen to play with SG Bogen. In 2016, he played in the Bayernliga Süd with TSV Bogen. He returned to the Landesliga Bayern-Mitte to sign with SV Neukirchen Hl. Blut for the remainder of the 2016–17 season. In 2017, he returned to play with SV Fortuna Regensburg.

== International career ==
On November 11, 2011, Benjamin was called up to Guyana for their 2014 FIFA World Cup qualifiers against Trinidad & Tobago. He made his international debut in the return-leg against Trinidad at Hasely Crawford Stadium on November 15, 2011.

== Honors ==
Kingston

- Canadian Soccer League First Division: 2013
