= 2012 Canadian Soccer League season =

Canadian Soccer League First Division
- Season: 2012
- Champions: Toronto Croatia (regular season); Toronto Croatia (playoffs)
- Matches: 176
- Goals: 621 (3.53 per match)
- Top goalscorer: 20 goals: Dražen Vuković
- Best goalkeeper: Antonio Ilic
- Biggest home win: MTL 8–1 SCW (20 May); WIN 7–0 BNF (25 August)
- Biggest away win: STC 0–7 TOR (19 September)
- Highest scoring: 10 goals: BNF 2–8 BRA (10 June); MIS 6–4 SER (10 August); KFC 3–7 SER (8 September)

The 2012 Canadian Soccer League season (known as the Givova Canadian Soccer League for sponsorship reasons) was the 15th since its establishment where a total of 28 teams from Ontario and Quebec took part in the league. The season began on 5 May 2012, and concluded on 27 October 2012. Toronto Croatia defended their championship in a 1–0 victory over the Montreal Impact Academy in the CSL Championship final at Centennial Park Stadium in Toronto. Montreal became the second Quebec club after Trois-Rivières Attak to reach the final, while Toronto added more silverware to their cabinet by winning the double during the regular season. In the Second Division SC Toronto B won their first Second Division championship, and TFC Academy II secured the regular season title.

The league grew to a record amount of 16 first division teams with Kingston, Waterloo, and Niagara being promoted to the first division. A number of CSL teams began operating their academy teams in the Canadian Academy of Futbol (CAF). During the past three seasons the league's player developmental system made further advances with 27 players moving overseas, and 42 being selected to the Canada national team program. While six TFC Academy players were signed by first team Toronto FC of the Major League Soccer.

Rogers TV continued broadcasting matches for the CSL, while CogecoTV provided coverage to the Niagara and Kingston regions. The league reintroduced their television program This Week in the CSL with producer Alex Bastyovanszky returning to host the program with Rogers TV broadcasting the program.

== Changes from 2011 ==
Each team will play an unbalanced schedule of 22 games for the 2012 season.

== Teams ==
A total of 16 teams will contest the league, including 13 from the 2011 season and three expansion teams. The league will feature three expansion teams which started play in last years second division, Kingston FC which joined the CSL as Prospect FC, Niagara United, and SC Waterloo Region formerly known as KW United FC. Capital City F.C. will not return for the 2012 season after failing to renew their league membership.

| Team | City | Stadium | Manager |
|---|---|---|---|
| Brampton United | Brampton, ON (Bramalea) | Victoria Park Stadium | Armando Costa |
| Brantford Galaxy | Brantford, ON | Steve Brown Sports Complex | Tomo Dančetović |
| Kingston FC | Kingston, ON | CaraCo Home Field | Colm Muldoon |
| London City | London, ON (Westmount) | Cove Road Stadium | Nenad Begović Mike Marcoccia |
| Mississauga Eagles FC | Mississauga, ON | Hershey Centre | Alex Szczotka |
| Montreal Impact Academy (U21) | Montreal, QC | CS St. Jean De Vianney | Philippe Eullaffroy |
| Niagara United | Niagara Falls, ON | Kalar Park Sports Field | James McGillivray |
| North York Astros | Toronto, ON (North York) | Esther Shiner Stadium | Gerardo Lezcano |
| SC Toronto | Toronto, ON (Liberty Village) | Lamport Stadium | Patrice Gheisar |
| SC Waterloo Region | Waterloo, ON | Seagram Stadium; St. David's High School | Lazo Džepina |
| Serbian White Eagles | Toronto, ON (Etobicoke) | Centennial Park Stadium | Uroš Stamatović |
| St. Catharines Roma Wolves | St. Catharines (Vansickle) | Club Roma | Carlo Arghittu |
| TFC Academy (U18) | Toronto, ON (North York) | Downsview Park | Danny Dichio |
| Toronto Croatia | Toronto, ON (Etobicoke) | Centennial Park Stadium | Velimir Crljen |
| Windsor Stars | Windsor, ON | Windsor Stadium | Steve Vagnini |
| York Region Shooters | Vaughan, ON (Maple) | St. Joan of Arc High School | John Pacione |

=== Coaching changes ===
| Team | Outgoing coach | Manner of departure | Date of vacancy | Position in table | Incoming coach | Date of appointment |
|---|---|---|---|---|---|---|
| Kingston FC | Jimmy Hamrouni | Resigned | June 28, 2012 | 14th in June | Colm Muldoon | June 28, 2012 |
| London City | Stanislav Zvezdic | Resigned | July 13, 2012 | 13th in July | Nenad Begović Mike Marcoccia | July 13, 2012 |
| Brantford Galaxy | Ron Davidson | Sacked | July 29, 2012 | 4th in July | Tomo Dančetović | July 29, 2012 |

Location of CSL teams outside of Toronto for the 2012 CSL season.
Location of CSL teams in Toronto for the 2012 CSL season.

== Results ==
| Home \ Away | BRA | BNF | KFC | LON | MIS | MTL | NIA | NYA | SCT | SCW | SER | STC | TFCA | TOR | WIN | YRS |
|---|---|---|---|---|---|---|---|---|---|---|---|---|---|---|---|---|
| Brampton United | | 7–1 | 1–0 | 3–3 | 1–0 | | 1–2 | 6–0 | | 2–0 | | 4–0 | 1–2 | 0–1 | 0–1 | |
| Brantford Galaxy | 2–8 | | 2–3 | 4–0 | 3–6 | | 3–0 | | | 0–5 | 1–4 | 1–1 | 1–0 | 0–2 | 1–0 | |
| Kingston FC | | | | 1–4 | 0–2 | 1–2 | 1–2 | 2–1 | 0–1 | | 3–7 | | 2–4 | 1–5 | 0–5 | 1–1 |
| London City | 3–2 | 4–2 | | | 2–2 | 1–1 | 1–0 | | 0–5 | 2–1 | | 2–0 | | 1–3 | 1–1 | 2–2 |
| Mississauga Eagles | | | 3–0 | | | 1–1 | 1–3 | 5–1 | 1–4 | 3–2 | 6–4 | | 0–0 | 2–3 | 0–1 | 1–4 |
| Montreal Impact Academy | 0–2 | 6–1 | 7–0 | | 2–2 | | | 5–0 | 1–0 | 3–1 | 1–0 | 8–1 | 1–0 | | | 0–0 |
| Niagara United | 4–1 | 1–2 | | 4–0 | | 0–3 | | 4–0 | | 2–1 | | 1–1 | 0–2 | 0–0 | 2–1 | 0–0 |
| North York Astros | | 2–5 | 1–2 | 2–3 | 0–2 | 0–3 | | | 0–4 | | 2–1 | | 0–2 | 0–6 | 1–6 | 0–0 |
| SC Toronto | 2–1 | 6–1 | 3–2 | | 5–1 | 1–1 | 3–0 | 4–0 | | | 3–1 | 5–0 | 0–0 | | | 0–1 |
| SC Waterloo Region | 2–0 | 1–7 | 0–1 | 5–0 | | | 2–3 | 6–0 | 1–0 | | 4–0 | 4–0 | | 1–0 | 2–0 | |
| Serbian White Eagles | 3–1 | | 2–1 | 2–2 | 1–1 | 1–2 | 6–1 | 2–0 | 2–0 | | | 2–0 | 2–2 | | | 1–0 |
| St. Catharines Wolves | 3–3 | 0–2 | 1–0 | 2–2 | 1–2 | | 1–3 | 0–3 | | 0–4 | | | 0–5 | 0–7 | 1–1 | |
| TFC Academy | | | 1–0 | 6–0 | 3–0 | 2–4 | | 2–1 | 1–2 | 4–1 | 2–5 | | | 1–4 | 2–2 | 0–1 |
| Toronto Croatia | 1–1 | 4–1 | | 3–0 | | 2–0 | 3–1 | | 1–1 | 6–1 | 0–0 | 3–0 | | | 2–1 | 0–0 |
| Windsor Stars | 1–0 | 7–0 | | 4–1 | | 1–0 | 3–1 | | 0–1 | 3–1 | 2–1 | 4–1 | | 1–1 | | 1–2 |
| York Region Shooters | 4–4 | 1–0 | 6–2 | | 3–1 | 0–1 | | 3–1 | 1–1 | 1–1 | 1–1 | 1–0 | 1–1 | | | |

Updated to match(es) played on 10 October 2012. Source: Various Team Websites
Legend: Blue = home team win; Yellow = draw; Red = away team win.

== Positions by round ==
| Team ╲ Round | 1 | 2 | 3 | 4 | 5 | 6 | 7 | 8 | 9 | 10 | 11 | 12 | 13 | 14 | 15 | 16 | 17 | 18 | 19 | 20 | 21 | 22 |
|---|---|---|---|---|---|---|---|---|---|---|---|---|---|---|---|---|---|---|---|---|---|---|
| Toronto Croatia | 3 | 3 | 2 | 1 | 1 | 1 | 1 | 1 | 1 | 1 | 1 | 1 | 1 | 1 | 2 | 1 | 1 | 1 | 1 | 1 | 1 | 1 |
| Montreal Impact Academy | 9 | 4 | 8 | 5 | 4 | 3 | 2 | 5 | 4 | 4 | 6 | 7 | 7 | 7 | 4 | 4 | 4 | 3 | 3 | 3 | 3 | 2 |
| SC Toronto | 1 | 1 | 1 | 3 | 7 | 6 | 6 | 4 | 5 | 2 | 2 | 3 | 2 | 2 | 1 | 2 | 2 | 2 | 2 | 2 | 2 | 3 |
| Windsor Stars | 14 | 10 | 5 | 7 | 10 | 8 | 9 | 8 | 8 | 8 | 7 | 8 | 8 | 8 | 8 | 7 | 6 | 6 | 6 | 4 | 4 | 4 |
| York Region Shooters | 6 | 6 | 9 | 9 | 11 | 10 | 10 | 9 | 9 | 9 | 8 | 6 | 6 | 4 | 5 | 5 | 5 | 4 | 4 | 5 | 5 | 5 |
| Serbian White Eagles | 7 | 5 | 3 | 2 | 2 | 2 | 4 | 7 | 7 | 7 | 9 | 9 | 9 | 9 | 10 | 10 | 8 | 9 | 7 | 7 | 7 | 6 |
| TFC Academy | 4 | 8 | 4 | 6 | 8 | 7 | 5 | 3 | 2 | 5 | 4 | 2 | 3 | 3 | 3 | 3 | 3 | 5 | 5 | 6 | 6 | 7 |
| Niagara United | 10 | 9 | 7 | 10 | 5 | 4 | 7 | 10 | 10 | 11 | 11 | 12 | 12 | 12 | 12 | 12 | 12 | 12 | 12 | 9 | 8 | 8 |
| SC Waterloo Region | 5 | 2 | 6 | 8 | 12 | 9 | 11 | 12 | 12 | 12 | 12 | 10 | 10 | 11 | 11 | 11 | 11 | 8 | 10 | 11 | 10 | 9 |
| Mississauga Eagles | 2 | 7 | 10 | 12 | 9 | 12 | 12 | 11 | 11 | 10 | 10 | 11 | 11 | 10 | 9 | 9 | 9 | 10 | 8 | 10 | 11 | 10 |
| Brampton United | 11 | 11 | 11 | 4 | 3 | 5 | 3 | 2 | 3 | 6 | 5 | 5 | 4 | 5 | 6 | 6 | 7 | 7 | 9 | 8 | 9 | 11 |
| London City | 7 | 12 | 14 | 15 | 14 | 13 | 14 | 13 | 13 | 13 | 13 | 13 | 13 | 13 | 13 | 13 | 13 | 13 | 13 | 13 | 12 | 12 |
| Brantford Galaxy | 11 | 14 | 12 | 11 | 6 | 11 | 8 | 6 | 6 | 3 | 3 | 4 | 5 | 6 | 7 | 8 | 10 | 11 | 11 | 12 | 13 | 13 |
| Kingston FC | 13 | 12 | 14 | 14 | 13 | 14 | 13 | 14 | 14 | 14 | 14 | 14 | 14 | 14 | 14 | 14 | 15 | 15 | 14 | 14 | 14 | 14 |
| St. Catharines Wolves | 16 | 16 | 16 | 16 | 16 | 16 | 16 | 15 | 15 | 15 | 15 | 15 | 16 | 15 | 16 | 15 | 14 | 14 | 15 | 15 | 15 | 15 |
| North York Astros | 15 | 15 | 13 | 13 | 15 | 15 | 15 | 16 | 16 | 16 | 16 | 16 | 15 | 16 | 15 | 16 | 16 | 16 | 16 | 16 | 16 | 16 |

Source: canadiansoccerleague.com

== Standings ==
| Pos | Team | Pld | W | D | L | GF | GA | GD | Pts | Qualification |
|---|---|---|---|---|---|---|---|---|---|---|
| 1 | Toronto Croatia (A, C, O) | 22 | 15 | 6 | 1 | 57 | 13 | +44 | 51 | Playoffs |
| 2 | Montreal Impact Academy (A) | 22 | 14 | 5 | 3 | 52 | 17 | +35 | 47 | Playoffs |
| 3 | SC Toronto (A) | 22 | 14 | 4 | 4 | 51 | 16 | +35 | 46 | Playoffs |
| 4 | Windsor Stars (A) | 22 | 12 | 4 | 6 | 46 | 21 | +25 | 40 | Playoffs |
| 5 | York Region Shooters (A) | 22 | 9 | 11 | 2 | 33 | 19 | +14 | 38 | Playoffs |
| 6 | Serbian White Eagles (A) | 22 | 10 | 5 | 7 | 48 | 35 | +13 | 35 | Playoffs |
| 7 | TFC Academy (A) | 22 | 10 | 5 | 7 | 42 | 28 | +14 | 35 | Playoffs |
| 8 | Niagara United (A) | 22 | 10 | 3 | 9 | 34 | 36 | −2 | 33 | Playoffs |
| 9 | SC Waterloo Region | 22 | 10 | 1 | 11 | 46 | 37 | +9 | 31 | |
| 10 | Mississauga Eagles | 22 | 8 | 5 | 9 | 42 | 44 | −2 | 29 | |
| 11 | Brampton United | 22 | 8 | 4 | 10 | 49 | 35 | +14 | 28 | |
| 12 | London City | 22 | 7 | 7 | 8 | 34 | 55 | −21 | 28 | |
| 13 | Brantford Galaxy | 22 | 8 | 1 | 13 | 40 | 68 | −28 | 25 | |
| 14 | Kingston FC | 22 | 4 | 1 | 17 | 23 | 61 | −38 | 13 | |
| 15 | St. Catharines Wolves | 22 | 1 | 5 | 16 | 13 | 67 | −54 | 8 | |
| 16 | North York Astros | 22 | 2 | 1 | 19 | 15 | 73 | −58 | 7 | |

Source: []
Rules for classification: 1) points; 2) goal difference; 3) number of goals scored.
(A) Advance to a further round; (C) Champions; (O) Play-off winners

=== Tiebreak rules ===
1. Total wins in regular season games.
2. Head-to-head record based on total points in league games.
3. Goal difference in regular season games.
4. Goals scored in regular season games.

== Goal scorers ==
Statistics as of 7 October 2012.

| Rank | Scorer | Club | Goals |
|---|---|---|---|
| 1 | (Croatia) Dražen Vuković | SC Waterloo Region | 20 |
| 2 | (Serbia) Zoran Rajović | Serbian White Eagles | 18 |
| 3 | (Croatia) Marin Vučemilović-Grgić | Toronto Croatia | 16 |
| 4 | (Jamaica) Richard West | Serbian White Eagles | 15 |
| 5 | (Canada) David Guzman | Brampton United | 14 |
| 6 | (Croatia) Tihomir Maletić | Toronto Croatia | 13 |
| 6 | (Canada) Miloš Šćepanović | Brampton United | 13 |
| 8 | (Canada) Joey Melo | Mississauga Eagles FC | 12 |
| 8 | (Canada) Jarek Whiteman | SC Toronto | 12 |
| 10 | (Canada) Jonathan Osorio | SC Toronto | 11 |
| 11 | (Senegal) Mademba Ba | Kingston FC | 10 |
| 11 | (Canada) Sergio Camargo | TFC Academy | 10 |

== Playoffs ==
=== Bracket ===
The top 8 teams will qualify for the one-game quarter final, and a one-game semi-final leading to the championship game to be played on 27 October at Centennial Park Stadium.

Quarter-Final
1 | Toronto Croatia | 2
8 | Niagara United | 0
3 | SC Toronto | 0
6 | Serbian White Eagles | 1
2 | Montreal Impact Academy | 2
7 | TFC Academy | 0
4 | Windsor Stars | 0
5 | York Region Shooters | 1

Semi-Final
1 | Toronto Croatia | 4
6 | Serbian White Eagles | 0
2 | Montreal Impact Academy | 3
5 | York Region Shooters | 1

Final
1 | Toronto Croatia | 1
2 | Montreal Impact Academy | 0

=== Quarterfinals ===
| 13 October 2012 | SC Toronto | 0–1 (a.e.t.) | Serbian White Eagles | Toronto, Ontario |
| 7:00 ET | | (Report) | West 103' | Stadium: Lamport Stadium; Attendance: 100; Referee: Justin Tasev (Ontario) |

| 14 October 2012 | Montreal Impact Academy | 2–0 | TFC Academy | Montreal, Quebec |
| 2:00 ET | Ilcu 10', 63' | (Report) | | Stadium: Saputo Stadium |

| 14 October 2012 | Windsor Stars | 0–1 | York Region Shooters | Windsor, Ontario |
| 4:00 ET | | (Report) | Gomez 75' (pen.) | Stadium: Windsor Stadium; Referee: Hassane Rafai (Ontario) |

| 14 October 2012 | Toronto Croatia | 2–0 | Niagara United | Toronto, Ontario |
| 8:00 ET | Bozenko Lesina 78'; Vučemilović-Grgić 90+2' | (Report) | | Stadium: Centennial Park Stadium; Attendance: 150 |

=== Semifinals ===
| 21 October 2012 | Montreal Impact Academy | 3–1 | York Region Shooters | Montreal, Quebec |
| 2:00 ET | Lefevre 26' (pen.); Jackson-Hamel 46'; Ait-Slimane 90+4' | (Report) | Kadian Lecky 35' | Stadium: St Jean de Vianney; Referee: Christopher Grabasse (Quebec) |

| 21 October 2012 | Toronto Croatia | 4–0 | Serbian White Eagles | Toronto, Ontario |
| 8:00 ET | Keran 19'; Tihomir Maletić 51', 54'; Srzentić 86' | (Report) | | Stadium: Centennial Park Stadium; Attendance: 750; Referee: David Barrie (Ontario) |

=== Givova CSL Championship ===
27 October 2012
3:00 PM

| Toronto Croatia | 1–0 | Montreal Impact Academy |
|---|---|---|
| Vučemilović-Grgić 83' | Report |

Centennial Park Stadium
Toronto, Ontario
Attendance: 200
Referee: Yusri Rudolph (Ontario)

| GK | 12 | (Canada) Antonio Ilic |
| RB | 7 | (Jamaica) Halburto Harris |
| CB | 4 | (Canada) Sven Arapovic |
| CB | 3 | (Croatia) Josip Keran |
| LB | 15 | (Trinidad and Tobago) Ainsley Deer |
| RM | 14 | (Croatia) Andelo Srzentic | (substituted off) 90' |
| CM | 19 | (Croatia) Petar Mingon |
| CM | 23 | (Croatia) Tonci Pirija (c) |
| LM | 8 | (Trinidad and Tobago) Hayden Fitzwilliams |
| ST | 24 | (Croatia) Marin Vučemilović-Grgić | (substituted off) 88' |
| ST | 10 | (Croatia) Tihomir Maletic |
Substitutes:
| GK | 1 | (Canada) Panagiotis Koumoulas |
| DF | 6 | (Croatia) Josip Bonacin |
| DF | 22 | (Croatia) Josip Roso |
| MF | 20 | (Croatia) Dino Buljan |
| MF | 21 | (Canada) Daniel Niksic | (substituted on) 90' |
| FW | 18 | (Croatia) Bozenko Lesina | (substituted on) 88' |
| FW | 11 | (Croatia) Boris Tomac |
Manager:
(Croatia) Velimir Crljen

| GK | 41 | (Canada) Jason Beaulieu |
| RB | 50 | (Canada) Hugo Lapointe-Senecal |
| CB | 54 | (Canada) Kai Morton |
| CB | 34 | (Canada) Karl Ouimette |
| LB | 44 | (Canada) Amine Meftouh | (substituted off) 90' |
| RM | 43 | (Canada) Zakaria Messoudi | (substituted off) 65' |
| CM | 55 | (Canada) Wandrille Lefèvre |
| CM | 60 | (Canada) Dominique Morin (c) |
| LM | 51 | (Canada) Maxim Tissot |
| FW | 39 | (Romania) Mircea Ilcu |
| FW | 56 | (Canada) Anthony Jackson-Hamel | (substituted off) 31' |
Substitutes:
| GK | 70 | (Canada) Hicham Kettani |
| MF | 46 | (Canada) Philippe Lincourt-Joseph | (substituted on) 90' |
| MF | 48 | (Canada) Kevin Luarca | (substituted on) 86' |
| MF | 61 | (Canada) Felix Cardin |
| MF | 71 | (Canada) Yacine Ait-Slimane | (substituted on) 65' |
| FW | 72 | (Canada) Jérémy Gagnon-Laparé |
| FW | 45 | (Canada) Victor N'Diaye | (substituted on) 31' (substituted off) 86' |
Manager:
(France) Philippe Eullaffroy

Assistant referees:
Gianni Facchini
Dave Ashfield
Fourth official:
Hassane Rifai

== CSL Executive Committee and Staff ==
The 2012 CSL Executive Committee.

| Position | Name | Nationality |
|---|---|---|
| Commissioner: | Vincent Ursini | (Canada) Canadian |
| Director of Media and PR: | Stan Adamson | (England) English |
| League Administrator: | Pino Jazbec | (Canada) Canadian |
| Director of Officials: | Tony Camacho | (Portugal) Portuguese |

== Individual awards ==
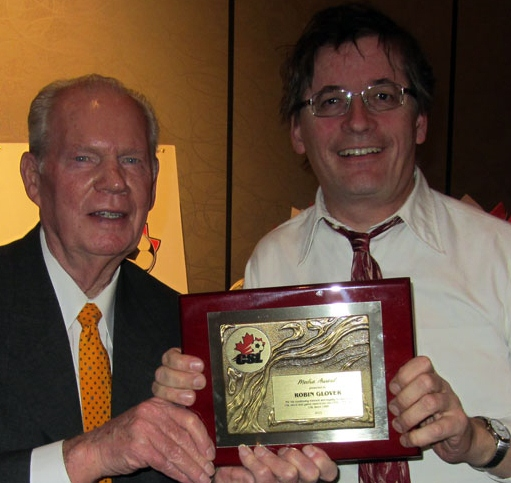
Stan Adamson (left) presenting Media award to Robin Glover

The annual CSL awards were held at the Mississauga Convention Centre in Mississauga, Ontario on 25 November 2012. The league chose Marin Vucemilovic-Grgic as its MVP, a former 2. HNL player who spearheaded Toronto Croatia's to the best offensive record. Toronto also managed to produce the best defensive record throughout the season, and as a result Antonio Ilic was named the Goalkeeper of the Year. Another Croatian import who played with SC Waterloo Drazen Vukovic received the Golden Boot. While Montreal Impact Academy alumni Maxim Tissot was given the Defender, who later was promoted to the Montreal Impact senior team.

SC Toronto developed Jonathan Osorio into the Rookie of the Year, who later was signed by Toronto FC in the MLS. After leading the Windsor Stars to their first postseason appearance since the 2007 season Steve Vagnini was voted the Coach of the Year. Ryan Gauss was honored with the Harry Paul Gauss award for his commitment and allegiance to the league. For the second straight season David Barrie was selected by the CSL Referee Committee as the Referee of the Year. TFC Academy were given their third Fair Play and Respect award for their solid discipline on the field of play.

Robin Glover and Enio Perruzza were acknowledged by the league for their continual years of service, and were given the Media and Broadcaster awards. Glover received the Media award for his years of loyalty in producing match reports since the 1995 CNSL season. While Perruzza was given the Broadcaster award for announcing over 3,000 matches throughout a span of 26 years.

| Award | Player (Club) |
|---|---|
| CSL Most Valuable Player | Marin Vucemilovic-Grgic (Toronto Croatia) |
| CSL Golden Boot | Drazen Vukovic (SC Waterloo) |
| CSL Goalkeeper of the Year Award | Antonio Ilic (Toronto Croatia) |
| CSL Defender of the Year Award | Maxim Tissot (Montreal Impact Academy) |
| CSL Rookie of the Year Award | Jonathan Osorio (SC Toronto) |
| CSL Coach of the Year Award | Steve Vagnini (Windsor Stars) |
| Harry Paul Gauss Award | Ryan Gauss (London City) |
| CSL Referee of the Year Award | David Barrie |
| CSL Fair Play Award | TFC Academy |
| CSL Media Award | Robin Glover |
| CSL Broadcaster Award | Enio Perruzza |

== Second Division ==
Canadian Soccer League Second Division
- Season: 2012
- Champions: TFC Academy II (Second Division regular season); SC Toronto B (Second Division playoffs)
- Matches: 96
- Goals: 394 (4.1 per match)
- Top goalscorer: Gino Berardi (17)

The CSL fielded 12 teams in its Second Division, all reserve teams of players mostly under 23 years of age. With emphasis on developing the younger players, the league rule allows for a maximum three players and the goalkeeper to be over 23. The teams played a 16-game schedule. The division decreased its membership to 12 teams after Kingston FC, Niagara United, and SC Waterloo were promoted to the First Division, but retained their reserves squad in the Second Division. London City, and Toronto Croatia also withdrew their reserve teams with Windsor Stars entering a reserve squad.

=== Standings ===
| Pos | Team | Pld | W | D | L | GF | GA | GD | Pts | Qualification |
|---|---|---|---|---|---|---|---|---|---|---|
| 1 | TFC Academy II (A) | 16 | 13 | 3 | 0 | 57 | 9 | +48 | 42 | Playoffs |
| 2 | Windsor Stars B (A) | 16 | 11 | 2 | 3 | 53 | 23 | +30 | 35 | Playoffs |
| 3 | Niagara United B (A) | 16 | 10 | 1 | 5 | 43 | 31 | +12 | 31 | Playoffs |
| 4 | SC Toronto B (A) | 16 | 8 | 4 | 4 | 53 | 19 | +34 | 28 | Playoffs |
| 5 | SC Waterloo Region B (A) | 16 | 8 | 3 | 5 | 25 | 22 | +3 | 27 | Playoffs |
| 6 | Brampton United B (A) | 16 | 8 | 2 | 6 | 40 | 24 | +16 | 26 | Playoffs |
| 7 | York Region Shooters B (A) | 16 | 7 | 3 | 6 | 22 | 31 | −9 | 24 | Playoffs |
| 8 | Mississauga Eagles B (A) | 16 | 5 | 6 | 5 | 26 | 37 | −11 | 21 | Playoffs |
| 9 | Serbian White Eagles B | 16 | 5 | 3 | 8 | 26 | 32 | −6 | 18 | |
| 10 | St. Catharines Wolves B | 16 | 5 | 0 | 11 | 25 | 39 | −14 | 15 | |
| 11 | Kingston FC B | 16 | 1 | 1 | 14 | 15 | 72 | −57 | 4 | |
| 12 | Brantford Galaxy SC B | 16 | 1 | 0 | 15 | 9 | 55 | −46 | 3 | |

Updated to match(es) played on 10 October 2012. Source: http://canadiansoccerleague.com/schedules/res_standings.htm
Rules for classification: 1) points; 2) goal difference; 3) number of goals scored.
(A) Advance to a further round

=== Second Division Playoffs ===
Quarter-Final
4 | SC Toronto B | 6
5 | SC Waterloo Region B | 0
1 | TFC Academy II | 0
8 | Mississauga Eagles B | 2
3 | Niagara United B | 1
6 | Brampton United B | 2
2 | Windsor Stars B | 0
7 | York Region Shooters B | 2

Semi-Final
4 | SC Toronto B | 2 (4)
8 | Mississauga Eagles B | 2 (3)
6 | Brampton United B | 2
7 | York Region Shooters B | 0

Final
4 | SC Toronto B | 3
6 | Brampton United B | 1

=== Quarterfinals ===
| 13 October 2012 | Windsor Stars B | 0–2 | York Region Shooters B | Windsor, Ontario |
| 4:00 | | (Report) | | Stadium: Windsor Stadium |

| 13 October 2012 | Niagara United B | 2–1 | Brampton City Utd B | Niagara Falls, Ontario |
| 4:00 | | (Report) | | Stadium: Kalar Sports Park |

| 13 October 2012 | TFC Academy II | 0–2 | Mississauga Eagles FC B | Toronto, Ontario |
| 8:00 | | (Report) | | Stadium: Downsview Park |

| 14 October 2012 | SC Toronto B | 6–0 | SC Waterloo B | Toronto, Ontario |
| 4:00 | | (Report) | | Stadium: Downsview Park |

=== Semifinals ===
| 21 October 2012 | SC Toronto B | 2–2 (a.e.t.) (4–3 p) | Mississauga Eagles FC B | Toronto, Ontario |
| 12:30 | Brandon John 45'; Brandon John 90' | (Report) | Joe De Sousa 53'; Joe De Sousa 58' | Stadium: Downsview Park |

| 21 October 2012 | Brampton City Utd B | 2–0 | York Region Shooters B | Brampton, Ontario |
| | Michael Tcherenkov 69'; Yusif Walied 73' | (Report) | | Stadium: Avondale |

=== Final ===
| 27 October 2012 | SC Toronto B | 3–1 | Brampton City Utd B | Toronto, Ontario |
| 12:30 | Sahsa Ricciuti 43'; Jordan Kalk 45'; Adrian Perez 79' | (Report) | Nathaniel Ennis 21' | Stadium: Centennial Park Stadium |

=== Individual awards ===
| Award | Player (Club) |
|---|---|
| CSL Most Valuable Player | Gino Berardi (Windsor Stars B) |
| CSL Golden Boot | Gino Berardi (Windsor Stars B) |
| CSL Goalkeeper of the Year Award | Mark Rogal (TFC Academy II) |
| CSL Defender of the Year Award | Malcolm Mings (Niagara United B) |
| CSL Rookie of the Year Award | Mark Wadid (TFC Academy II) |
| CSL Coach of the Year Award | James McGillivray (Niagara United B) |

== Outside League Matches ==
| 12 May 2012 Friendly | TFC Reserves | 4–0 | UConn Huskies | Toronto |
| 16:00 EDT | | UConn Report | | Stadium: TFC Training Centre |

| 16 May 2012 Friendly | Hamilton FC Rage | 2–3 | UConn Huskies | Guelph |
| | | UConn Report | | Stadium: Guelph Soccer Complex |

| 19 May 2012 Friendly | Sigma FC | v | UConn Huskies |

| 30 May 2012 Friendly | Windsor Stars | 0–1 | Detroit City FC | Windsor Stadium |
| 19:30 EDT |

| 18 July 2012 Friendly | Detroit City FC | 0–0 | Windsor Stars | Detroit, MI |
| 19:00 EDT | | pre Report | | Stadium: Cass Tech High School; Attendance: 1,032 |

| 27 July 2012 Friendly | Troyes AC Reserves | v | Montreal Impact Academy | France |

| 29 July 2012 Friendly | AJ Auxerre Reserves | v | Montreal Impact Academy | France |

| 1 August 2012 Friendly | Stade de Reims Reserves | v | Montreal Impact Academy | France |
