= Jaroslav Tesař =

Czech footballer

Personal information
- Date of birth: 25 May 1986 (age 40)
- Place of birth: Kladno, Czechoslovakia
- Height: 1.90 m (6 ft 3 in)
- Position: Goalkeeper

Team information
- Current team: SK Kladno
- Number: 1

Youth career
- 1992–2003: TJ Sokol Brandýsek

Senior career*
| Years | Team | Apps | (Gls) |
| 2003–2006 | SK Kladno | | |
| 2006 | FC Čechie Velká Dobrá | | |
| 2007 | Vlašim | | |
| 2007–2008 | Loko Vltavín | | |
| 2008–2010 | SK Kladno | 19 | (0) |
| 2011–2012 | Napier City Rovers | | |
| 2013–2014 | Kingston FC | | |
| 2014– | SK Kladno | | |
- * Club domestic league appearances and goals

Jaroslav Tesař (born 25 May 1986) is a Czech football player who is currently playing for SK Kladno in the Czech Division B.

== Career ==
Tesař was born in Kladno and played professionally in the Czech Republic for SK Kladno. In the 2005–2006 Czech 2. Liga he helped the club achieve promotion to the Czech First League by finishing first in the standings. He had stints with lower-level clubs like FC Čechie Velká Dobrá, Vlašim, Loko Vltavín. In 2008, he returned to the top league with SK Kladno, and featured in 19 matches. In 2011, he went abroad to New Zealand to sign with Napier City Rovers FC of the Central Premier League.

In 2013, he went to Canada to sign with Kingston FC of the Canadian Soccer League. In his debut season with Kingston he won the regular season championship. In the postseason he helped the club reach the finals of the CSL Championship, but were defeated by SC Waterloo. Tesar contract was extended for the 2014 season. On 13 August 2014, he was released from his contract in order to sign with his former club SK Kladno.
