= Vitaliy Sidorov (footballer) =

Russian footballer

Vitaliy Sidorov Виталий Сидоров
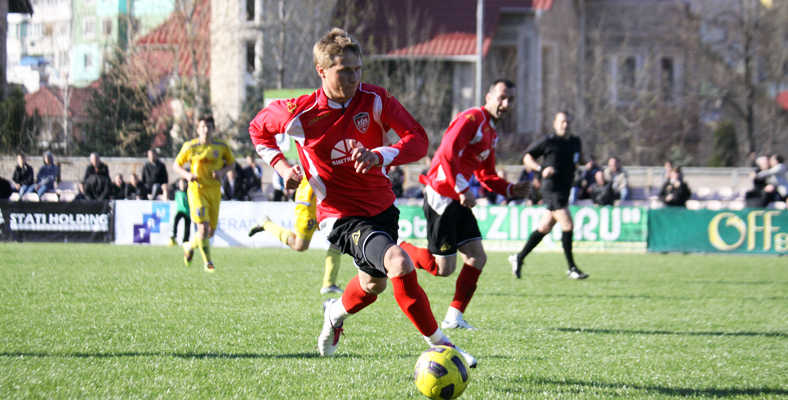

Personal information
- Full name: Vitaliy Vladimirovich Sidorov
- Date of birth: 6 March 1990 (age 36)
- Place of birth: Novosibirsk, Russian SFSR, Soviet Union
- Height: 1.72 m (5 ft 8 in)
- Position: Attacking midfielder

Youth career
- FC Sibir

Senior career*
Years	Team	Apps	(Gls)
2010	FC Sibir	0	(0)
2010–2011	FC Hapoel Ramat Gan	0	(0)
2010–2011	FC Olimpia	23	(4)
2011–2013	FC Kingston	12	(5)
2013–2014	BEC Tero Sasana F.C.	15	(6)
- * Club domestic league appearances and goals

Vitaliy Vladimirovich Sidorov (Russian: Виталий Владимирович Сидоров; born 6 March 1990) is a Russian former professional football player.

== Club career ==
Vitaliy started to play football from childhood in his home town with his local club FC Sibir. Since 2007, he has played for the youth and reserve teams of FC Sibir.

In 2010, Sidorov received an offer to come to a professional football club in Israel. The club FC Hapoel Ramat Gan Israel participated in the Israeli Premier League. After that Vitaliy was invited to a professional football club in Moldova FC Olimpia Balti which participates in the Moldavian Premier League. Vitaliy performed well with FC Olimpia scoring a goal on 85 minutes against Dacia in the semifinal of the Moldova Cup, and helping his team FC Olimpia advance to the Cup final in Moldova in 2011.

In 2012, Vitaliy received an offer to come to United States. He spent a pre-season training camp with the professional football club participating in the MLS. Immediately thereafter Vitaliy received an offer from a Canadian professional soccer club Kingston FC, which plays in the Canadian Soccer League. He reached a mutual agreement with Kingston FC and signed a contract with the team midway through the 2012 CSL season.

In 2013 Vitaliy Sidorov signed a contract with BEC Tero Sasana F.C. in Thailand Premier League.

Due to injury in 2015 Sidorov has ended his professional player career.

== Career statistics ==
Club	Div	Season	League		Cup		Europe		Total	
Club	Div	Season	Apps	Goals	Apps	Goals	Apps	Goals	Apps	Goals
FC Sibir	D1	2010	0	0	0	0	—		0	0
FC Sibir	Total		0	0	0	0	0	0	0	0
FC Hapoel Ramat Gan	D1	2010–2011	0	0	0	0	—		0	0
FC Hapoel Ramat Gan	Total		0	0	0	0	0	0	0	0
FC Olimpia Balti	D1	2010-2011	18	3	5	1	—		23	4
FC Olimpia Balti	Total		18	3	5	1	0	0	23	4
FC Kingston	D1	2011–2013	9	5	3	0	—		12	5
FC Kingston	Total		9	5	3	0	0	0	12	5
BEC Tero Sasana F.C.	D1	2013–2014	15	6	0	0	—		15	6
BEC Tero Sasana F.C.	Total		15	6	0	0	0	0	15	6
