= Anđelo Srzentić =

Croatian footballer (born 1990)

Personal information
- Date of birth: 25 August 1990 (age 36)
- Place of birth: Zadar, SR Croatia, SFR Yugoslavia
- Position: Midfielder

Senior career*
Years	Team	Apps	(Gls)
2008–2009	Zadar	2	(0)
2010–2011	Velebit		
2011–2012	Raštane		
2012	Toronto Croatia	21	(8)
2013–2014	NK Dragovoljac Poličnik		
2014–2015	SV Röchling Völklingen	14	(5)
2016–2017	SC Hauenstein	21	(4)
2017–2021	SV Rülzheim	66	(29)
2021–2022	SV Viktoria Herxheim	3	(3)
- * Club domestic league appearances and goals as of 26 December 2022

Anđelo Srzentić (born 25 January 1990) is a Croatian footballer who most recently played as a midfielder for German amateur side SV Viktoria Herxheim.

== Career ==
Srzentić began his career in 2008 with NK Zadar in the Croatian First Football League. Following his stint in the Croatian top tier he played in the Croatian Third Football League with NK Velebit, and NK Raštane. In 2012, he went overseas to Canada to play with Toronto Croatia in the Canadian Soccer League. In his debut season, he helped Croatia clinch the First Division title. He contributed a goal in a 4–0 victory over rivals the Serbian White Eagles in the semi-finals. He was featured in the CSL Championship final against Montreal Impact Academy, and won the match 1–0.

He returned to Croatia in 2013 to play with NK Dragovoljac Poličnik in the First County Football League. The following year he played abroad in Germany to play with SV Röchling Völklingen in the Oberliga Rheinland-Pfalz/Saar. In 2015, he signed with SC Hauenstein, where on 21 August 2016 he scored a goal against Bayer Leverkusen in a 2–1 defeat in the 2016–17 DFB-Pokal. After a season with Hauenstein, he signed a contract with SV Rülzheim.

In 2021, he signed with SV Viktoria Herxheim in the Landesliga.
