= CSL Golden Boot =

Canadian soccer award

- Awarded for: Most goals in a season
- Country: Canada
- Eligibility: Canadian Soccer League
- First award: 1998
- Final award: 2025
- Currently held by: Devroy Grey; Erick Hernandez (8 goals each)

Highlights
- Most awards: Serhiy Ivlyev; Gus Kouzmanis 2

The Canadian Soccer League Golden Boot is an annual Canadian soccer award given to the top goalscorer for each season in the Canadian Soccer League. The Golden Boot was awarded in 1998 when the Canadian National Soccer League merged with the stillborn Ontario Professional Soccer League to form the Canadian Professional Soccer League. The highest ranked CSL Golden Boot goalscorer is Gus Kouzmanis with 33 goals during the league's inaugural season. Kouzmanis and Serhiy Ivlyev have won the award the most times (2), with Kouzmanis in the 1998and 2000 seasons and Ivlyev in the 2016 and 2023 seasons. Players from twelve countries, other than Canada, have won the Golden Boot including Croatia (Tihomir Maletic, 2010, Dražen Vuković, 2012, Marin Vučemilović-Grgić 2014), Serbia (Aleksandar Stojiljković, 2017, Vladimir Strizovic, 2022), Ukraine (Serhiy Ivlyev, 2016, 2023, Mykola Temnyuk 2019), Trinidad and Tobago (Kevin Nelson, 2001), England (Darren Tilley, 2002), Jamaica (Richard West, 2015), Northern Ireland (Paul Munster, 2004), United States (Aaron Byrd, 2005), Romania (Gabriel Pop, 2006), France (Guillaume Surot, 2014), Ghana (Sani Dey, 2018), and Central African Republic (Moussa Limane, 2020) The club with the most top goalscorers is the Toronto/Mississauga Olympians with four wins followed by London City, Scarborough SC, Serbian White Eagles, and Trois-Rivières Attak with two.

== Winners ==
Season	Player	Team	Goals	Ref(s)
1998	(Canada) Gus Kouzmanis	Toronto Olympians	33	
1999	(Canada) Eddy Berdusco	Toronto Olympians	24	
2000	(Canada) Gus Kouzmanis	Toronto Olympians	12	
2001	(Trinidad and Tobago) Kevin Nelson	Ottawa Wizards	23	
2002	(England) Darren Tilley	Mississauga Olympians	20	
2003	(Canada) Carlo Arghittu	St. Catharines Wolves	18	
2004	(Northern Ireland) Paul Munster	London City	25	
2005	(United States) Aaron Byrd	Windsor Border Stars	17	
2006	(Romania) Gabriel Pop	Serbian White Eagles	27	
2007	(Canada) Nicolas Lesage	Trois-Rivières Attak	20	
2008	(Canada) Daniel Nascimento	Brampton Lions	18	
2009	(Canada) Reda Agourram	Trois-Rivières Attak	13	
2010	(Croatia) Tihomir Maletić	Toronto Croatia	17	
2011	(Canada) Stefan Vukovic	TFC Academy	18	
2012	(Croatia) Dražen Vuković	SC Waterloo Region	20	
2013	(France) Guillaume Surot	Kingston FC	28	
2014	(Croatia) Marin Vučemilović-Grgić	London City	20	
2015	(Jamaica) Richard West	York Region Shooters	23	
2016	(Ukraine) Serhiy Ivlyev	FC Ukraine United	15	
2017	(Serbia) Aleksandar Stojiljković	Scarborough SC	17	
2018	(Ghana) Sani Dey	Hamilton City	13	
2019	(Ukraine) Mykola Temnyuk	FC Vorkuta	18	
2020	(Central African Republic) Moussa Limane	Scarborough SC	7	
2021	(Cameroon) Wabila Wallace	Atletico Sporting Toronto	7	
2022	(Serbia) Vladimir Strizović	Serbian White Eagles	8	
2023	(Ukraine) Serhiy Ivlyev	Dynamo Toronto	13	
2024	(Serbia) Nikola Timotijević	Serbian White Eagles	13	
2025	(Jamaica) Devroy Grey (Mexico) Erick Hernandez	Scarborough SC; Unity FC	8	

=== Awards won by club ===
Rank	Club	Total
1	Toronto/Mississauga Olympians	4
2	Serbian White Eagles	3
2	Scarborough SC	3
3	London City	2
3	Trois-Rivieres Attak	2
4	Brampton United	1
4	FC Ukraine United	1
4	FC Vorkuta	1
4	Hamilton City	1
4	Kingston FC	1
4	Ottawa Wizards	1
4	SC Waterloo Region	1
4	St. Catharines Wolves	1
4	TFC Academy	1
4	Toronto Croatia	1
4	Windsor Border Stars	1
4	York Region Shooters	1
4	Unity FC	1
Total		27

=== Awards won by nationality ===
Rank	Country	Total
1	Canada	8
2	Croatia	3
2	Ukraine	3
2	Serbia	3
3	Jamaica	2
4	Central African Republic	1
4	England	1
4	France	1
4	Ghana	1
4	Northern Ireland	1
4	Romania	1
4	Trinidad and Tobago	1
4	United States	1
4	Mexico	1
Total		28

== See also ==
- Canadian Soccer League MVP Award
