= Kalar Sports Park =

- Interactive map of Kalar Sports Park
- Full name: Kalar Park Sports Field
- Location: Niagara Falls, Ontario
- Coordinates: 43°4′35.65″N 79°8′19.2″W
- Owner: Niagara United
- Capacity: 1000
- Surface: Artificial

Construction
- Built: 2012

Tenant
- Niagara United (2011-present)

Kalar Sports Park is a multi-purpose outdoor sports facility in Niagara Falls, Ontario. The stadium is owned by the Niagara United Football Club. It is located on 6775 Kalar Road. On August 17, 2012 Niagara United received a grant of $75, 000 from Ontario Trillium Foundation for the purchase of a new scoreboard. The club also spent around $750, 000 in renovations for the increase in stadium seats, scoreboard, new clubhouse, and new FIFA -approved turf field in order to accommodate the clubs needs by joining the Canadian Soccer League. The stadium hosted the 2013 CSL Championship final which featured SC Waterloo vs Kingston FC.
