= Jason Massie =

English footballer

Personal information
- Date of birth: 13 January 1984 (age 42)
- Place of birth: Liverpool, England
- Position: Midfielder

Youth career
- 1996–2004: Liverpool
- 2007–2008: Rio Grande Red Storm

Senior career*
Years	Team	Apps	(Gls)
2005–2006	Prescot Cables		
2007–2008	Cape Cod Crusaders	30	(2)
2009	Harrisburg City Islanders	13	(0)
2010	GPS Portland Phoenix	15	(4)
2010–2011	Marine		
2010–2011	→ Prescot Cables (loan)		
2011–2012	GPS Portland Phoenix	28	(6)
2013	Kingston FC	20	(10)
2014	Cataraqui Clippers		
Total		106	(22)
- * Club domestic league appearances and goals

Jason Massie (born 13 September 1984) is an English former footballer.

== Career ==
=== College and amateur ===
Massie was a member of the schoolboy academy at storied English football club Liverpool, working his way from the U12 team to play a few times with the club's reserves.

After a short stint with English non-league side Prescot Cables in the Northern Premier League, Massie moved to the United States to attend and play college soccer at the University of Rio Grande. He earned NAIA All-Region honors in 2007 and All-Conference accolades in 2007 and 2008, and was also an Honorable Mention All-American both years.

During his college years Massie also played in the USL Premier Development League with the Cape Cod Crusaders.

=== Professional ===
Massie turned professional in 2009 when he signed with the Harrisburg City Islanders in the USL Second Division. He made his professional debut on 18 April 2009 in Harrisburg's opening day 2–2 tie with the Richmond Kickers, and went on to make 13 appearances for the team before being released at the end of the season.

Having been unable to secure a professional contract elsewhere, Massie signed to play with USL Premier Development League expansion franchise GPS Portland Phoenix in 2010; the Phoenix are owned by the same parent company that ran the Cape Cod Crusaders.

After a brief stint back in England playing Northern Premier League side Marine, Massie returned to play for GPS Portland Phoenix in 2011. On 19 February 2013 he signed with Kingston FC of the Canadian Soccer League. During his tenure with Kingston he helped the club clinch the regular season championship. In the playoffs the club reached the CSL Championship finals where they faced SC Waterloo, but were defeated by a score of 3–1. On 1 May 2015 he signed with Cataraqui Clippers of League1 Ontario.

=== International ===
Massie played for the England U17s team, but has never played for any of his country's senior teams.
