= SC Waterloo Region =

Canadian association football team

- Full name: Soccer Club Waterloo Region
- Founded: 2011 (14 years ago) (as KW United FC)
- Dissolved: 2020 (5 years ago)
- Stadium: RIM Park; Waterloo, Ontario
- President: Tony Kocis
- League: Canadian Soccer League
- Website: www.scwaterloo.ca
Home colours	Away colours

SC Waterloo Region was a Canadian soccer team based in Waterloo, Ontario. The club competed in various divisions in the Canadian Soccer League. The club was formed in 2011 under KW United FC and initially competed in the league's second division. The following year, the organization's name was changed to SC Waterloo Region, and it was promoted to the league's first division. While the first team played in the first division, Waterloo would at times operate a reserve squad in the second division.

Within a short time, Waterloo enjoyed a string of successes within the league. Their biggest achievement came in the 2013 season after winning the CSL Championship. Their second appearance in the championship finals was in 2015, where they finished as runners-up. In 2016, Waterloo voluntarily relegated itself to the second division and secured the divisional title. Their stay in the second division was short-lived, and they played the remainder of their existence in the league's top division. Once the COVID-19 pandemic occurred in 2020, Waterloo ceased operating a team in the league.

== History ==
In 2011, professional soccer returned to the Kitchener-Waterloo region since 1991 when the Kitchener Kickers competed in the original Canadian Soccer League. The team owners Tony Kocis and Vojislav Brisevac served as the club president, team manager, and secured a deal with Jako to sponsor the club. The club was named Kitchener-Waterloo United FC and began play in the Canadian Soccer League Second Division. The team's original venue was located at Budd Park. In their debut season, United finished fourth in their division and secured a postseason berth. At the conclusion of the season Ryan Pumier received the Goalkeeper of the Year award.

The following season the club was renamed SC Waterloo Region in order to strengthen ties with youth club Waterloo Minor Soccer Club, and was promoted to the CSL First Division. Their home venue was moved to University Stadium, and part owner Lazo Džepina with coaching credentials from Europe and the CSL assumed head coach responsibilities. Džepina's recruitment of players consisted primarily from the Yugoslavian countries players like Adis Hasecic, Nemanja Simeunovic, Vladimir Zelenbaba, Drazen Vukovic, Dado Hadrovic, and Haris Fazlagic was selected as team captain. Waterloo made their First Division debut on May 6, 2012 against Windsor Stars in a 2–0 victory with both goals coming from Hadrovic. In their inaugural season, the club finished ninth in the overall standings, and missed the final postseason berth by two points. At the CSL awards banquet Vukovic received the CSL Golden Boot for finishing as the league's top goalscorer with 20 goals.

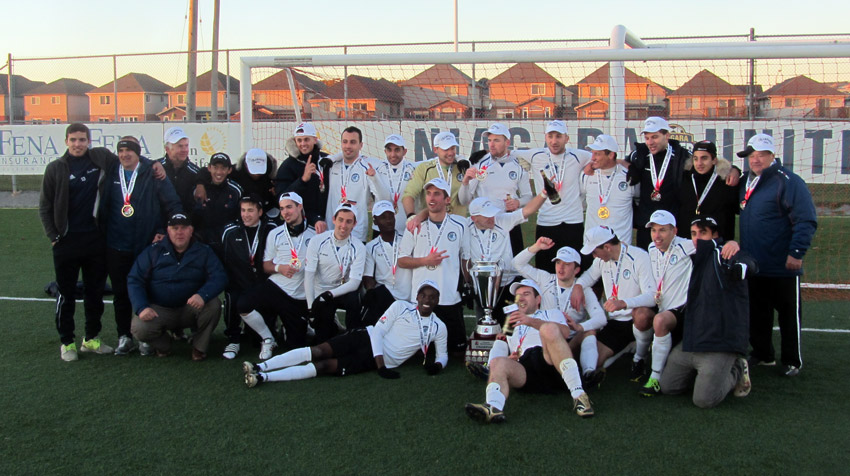
SC Waterloo team celebrating CSL Championship in 2013

In preparations for the 2013 season, Džepina acquired the services of Ranko Golijanin, and Predrag Papaz while retaining the majority of core veterans from the previous season. Meanwhile, Waterloo transferred their home venue to Warrior Field, and Vukovic was awarded the team captaincy. The team performed well during the regular season even achieving an eight-game undefeated streak at home. SC Waterloo managed to secure a postseason berth by finishing fifth in the overall standings with the second highest goal scoring record, and fourth best defensive record. In the first round of the postseason, their opponents were Brampton City United FC, where Waterloo advanced to the next round after thrashing Brampton 4–0 with goals coming from Fazlagic, Hasecic, Vukovic, and Zoran Kukic. The club faced Toronto Croatia in the semi-finals where the match concluded in a 1–1 draw which resulted in a penalty shootout with Waterloo winning the shootout by a score of 5–4. Their opponents in the CSL Championship final were regular season champions Kingston FC, where Waterloo claimed their first piece of silverware by defeating Kingston by a score of 3–1 with goals coming from Zelenbaba and Fazlagic. At the same time, the club's reserve team SC Waterloo B won the CSL Second Division championship defeating Toronto Croatia B by a score of 2–0 with goals from Erwin Uzunovic, and Mohammed-Ali Heydarpour.

For the 2014 season, Aleksandar Stojiljković, Ramon Bailey, and Kiril Dimitrov were brought in as reinforcements. Throughout the season, Waterloo's performance paled in comparison from their previous season, but still managed to clinch a playoff berth by finishing seventh in the overall standings. Their opponents in the first round were Toronto Croatia, where Waterloo failed to defend their championship after suffering a 4–2 loss. In the Second Division, Waterloo reached the finals where they were defeated by Kingston FC. At the conclusion of the season, Stojiljkovic and Nikola Miokovic were awarded the Rookie of the Year award for the First & Second Divisions.

Their performance in the 2015 season improved as they finished fourth in the overall standings, and recording the third best defensive record. In the first round of the playoffs, Waterloo faced Toronto Atomic FC, and advanced to the next round by a score of 2–0 with goals coming from Hasecic and Slobodan Milanovic. In the semi-finals, the opponents were regular season champions the Serbian White Eagles, whom they managed to upset by a score of 3–2 with goals from Mladen Zeljkovic, Ali Heydarpour, and Hasecic. For the second time in the club's history, they reached the CSL Championship final where they faced Toronto Croatia. The match did not end in their favor as Toronto managed to secure a goal in a 1–0 victory. The reserve team managed to create a milestone by reaching the championship finals for third straight year. Their opponents were Milton SC, but came short as their senior squad after suffering a 3–1 loss. Despite Waterloo's infield success, the club was without controversy as there was one reported allegation of match-fixing in a match against Niagara United. Waterloo officials responded by denying any involvement in trying to manipulate the outcome of the match against Niagara .

In 2016, SC Waterloo voluntarily were relegated to the CSL Second Division. Since their return to the Second Division, the Tri-City club secured the regular season title. Their opponents in the postseason were the York Region Shooters B, where they were eliminated from the competition by a score of 1–0. For the 2017 season, the club was promoted to the First Division.

== Notable players ==
- (Canada) Wesley Cain
- (Canada) Jake Inglis
- (Barbados) Zachary Ellis-Hayden
- (Bosnia and Herzegovina) Haris Fazlagić
- (Bosnia and Herzegovina) Jure Glavina
- (Bosnia and Herzegovina) Ranko Golijanin
- (Bosnia and Herzegovina) Adis Hasečić
- (Bosnia and Herzegovina) Slobodan Milanović
- (Bosnia and Herzegovina) Predrag Papaz
- (Bulgaria) Kiril Dimitrov
- (Chinese Taipei) Emilio Estevez
- (Croatia) Dražen Vuković
- (Serbia) Aleksandar Stojiljković
- (Serbia) Vladimir Zelenbaba
- (Serbia) Mladen Zeljković

== Honours ==
SC Waterloo Region

- CSL Championship: 2013
- CSL Championship runner-up: 2015
- Canadian Soccer League Second Division: 2016

SC Waterloo Region II

- CSL II Championship: 2013
- CSL II Championship runner-up: 2014, 2015
- Canadian Soccer League Second Division: 2015

== Head coaches ==
- Lazo Džepina (2012–2016)
- Stefan Ristic (2017)
- Radivoj Panić (2018–2019)

== Seasons ==
=== First team ===
Season	League	Teams	Record	Rank	Playoffs	Ref
2011	Canadian Soccer League (Second Division)	14	6–7–6	4th	Quarterfinals	
2012	Canadian Soccer League (First Division)	16	10–1–11	9th	did not qualify	
2013	Canadian Soccer League (First Division)	12	11–4–7	5th	Champions	
2014	Canadian Soccer League (First Division)	10	6–4–8	7th	Quarterfinals	
2015	Canadian Soccer League (First Division)	12	11–3–7	4th	Finals	
2016	Canadian Soccer League (Second Division)	6	9–2–3	1st	Semifinals	
2017	Canadian Soccer League (First Division)	8	1–5–8	7th	Quarterfinals	
2018	Canadian Soccer League (First Division)	9	9–2–5	3rd	Semifinals	
2019	Canadian Soccer League (First Division)	10	10–1–7	4th	Semifinals	

=== Second team ===
Season	League	Teams	Record	Rank	Playoffs	Ref
2012	Canadian Soccer League (Second Division)	12	8–3–5	5th	Quarterfinals	
2013	Canadian Soccer League (Second Division)	9	6–3–7	6th	Champions	
2014	Canadian Soccer League (Second Division)	9	7–5–4	4th	Finals	
2015	Canadian Soccer League (Second Division)	10	10–6–2	1st	Finals	
2017	Canadian Soccer League (Second Division)	8	5–1–8	6th	Quarterfinals	
