= Kingston FC =

Former Canadian association football team

- Founded: 2011 (as Prospect Football Club)
- Dissolved: 2014
- Stadium: Queen's University West Campus Field, Kingston, Ontario
- Capacity: 1,000
- Chairman: Lorne Abugov
- Head Coach: Colm Muldoon
- League: Canadian Soccer League
- Website: http://kingstonfc.ca
Home colours	Away colours

Kingston FC were a Canadian soccer team based in Kingston, Ontario, Canada. The team was awarded a franchise in 2011 as a member of the Canadian Soccer League, and participated in the league for three seasons, 2012 to 2014. In February 2015, Kingston FC formally announced that it had withdrawn from the Canadian Soccer League for the 2015 season. Furthermore, the Club announced that it had made application to the new League1 Ontario for a new professional team that will play in Belleville, Ontario.

Effective April 1, 2015, the Club has renamed itself the Quinte-Belleville Royals (QBR) Soccer Club, and applied to field a men's sem-professional team in League1 Ontario in 2016 and a woman's team in 2017, although this never occurred.

During its three seasons in the CSL, the club fielded two teams, a 1st Division professional team, Kingston FC and a Reserve 2nd Division semi-professional team, Kingston FC Reserve. The club began play on May 5, 2012, in their inaugural CSL season and played their home games at the Queen's University West Campus Turf Field, located at Johnson Street and John A. Macdonald Boulevard in Kingston.

On February 28, 2015, the Canadian Soccer League announced in a press release that Kingston FC would not be returning for the 2015 season.

== History ==
The club was formed by Jimmy Hamrouni and debuted under the name Prospect FC. The club began play in the Reserve Division of the Canadian Soccer League in 2011. However, they played most of their games as double headers in Maple, Ontario, rather than in Kingston. In 2012, Prospect FC was promoted to the First Division, and changed the team name to Kingston FC. Hamrouni also held the responsibilities of head coach, and acquired the likes of Guyanese International Julien Edwards, Vitaliy Sidorov, Mademba Ba, Ryan McCurdy, and Antonios Assaad. The club made its First Division debut on May 5, 2012, in a 2–0 victory over TFC Academy. After coaching eight matches team majority owner and head coach Jimmy Hamrouni citing business and personal reasons announced his resignation as head coach, and sold his share to Lorne Abugov and Joe Scanlon. The new owners announced the signing of Colm Muldoon as head coach. The club finished near the bottom of the standings in both the first and second divisions.

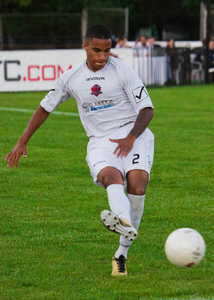
Guyanese international Taylor Benjamin played with Kingston FC during their regular season championship run.

In preparations for the 2013 CSL season the organization first act was to extend head coach Muldoon contract. Muldoon constructed a roster with a mixture of college, and players with professional experience. Notable additions to the roster were Jaroslav Tesař, Kenny Caceros, Cătălin Lichioiu, Jason Massie, Taylor Benjamin, Akil DeFreitas, Lukáš Bajer, and Stephane Assengue. His signings proved successful as the club enjoyed a remarkable turnaround within the CSL 1st Division, clinching the CSL regular season championship on September 29 with a 5–3 road win in Burlington. Both the First and Reserve division teams qualified for the 2013 CSL playoffs, the first post-season play ever in the history of Kingston FC. The Reserves dropped a 1–0 decision away to Toronto Croatia Reserves in the CSL quarter-finals. Kingston FC's first Division team, however, won home quarter-final and semi-final encounters against Serbian White Eagles (2–1) and London City (4–2), respectively, before losing the CSL Playoff Championship Final by a 3–1 score to SC Waterloo in Niagara Falls on November 3, 2013. At the conclusion of the season Guillaume Surot won the CSL Golden Boot Award, CSL MVP Award, and the Rookie of the Year. While Muldoon won the CSL Coach of the Year, and Mademba Ba won the CSL 2 Golden Boot award.

Muldoon added international experience to the roster for the 2014 season. Acquiring Kenyan international Adam Shaban as well as Paul Willis, and Stephen Hindmarch both with European soccer experience. Kingston FC opened its 2014 CSL Training Camp in Kingston on April 22, 2014, and kicked off its third and final season of operation in the CSL with a road game against York Region Shooters. At the conclusion of the 2014 season, the Kingston FC Reserves clinched first place and on the strength of an 18-game unbeaten streak clinched the CSL 2nd Division league championship, the second CSL championship for the Club in the last two seasons. The Reserves' 18 game consecutive unbeaten streak included a 12 win, 1 loss and 3 draw record for 39 points and a sweep of three CSL playoff games. The Kingston FC 1st Division team clinched home field advantage in the CSL playoffs finishing the regular season in third place, with an 8 win, 6 loss and 4 draw record, for 28 points. The 1st Division team lost a heart-breaking semi final encounter on the road to Toronto Croatia, 2-1 conceding an 89th-minute goal against the run of play to narrowly miss a second consecutive berth in the CSL Championship Final. Both the Kingston FC 1st Division and 2nd Division teams led their respective divisions in goals scored, and striker Mademba Ba led all CSL scorers with 31 2nd division goals and 7 1st Division goals to take the CSL Golden Boot award. The club also was awarded the CSL Fair Play and Respect award. After the de-sanctioning of the CSL by the Canadian Soccer Association, Kingston withdrew from the league in hopes of securing a franchise in the newly formed League1 Ontario.

== Final staff ==
Position	Nationality	Name
Chairman and general manager	CAN	Lorne Abugov
President	CAN	Joseph Scanlon
First team head coach	IRL	Colm Muldoon
First team assistant coach	CAN	Mike Akai
Reserve team head coach	IRL	Thomas Moran
Team goalkeeper coach	JPN	Yasuto Hoshiko
Media and public relations	CAN	Joseph Scanlon
Intern, game and training operations	CAN	Anna Krzemien
Team physiotherapist	CAN	Catherine MacLeod
Team kinesiologist	CAN	Scott McAllister
Team trainer	CAN	Amy Cornett
Team doctor	CAN	Dr. Jennifer Hacking
Manager, Social Media	CAN	Rob Denaburg

== Former coaches ==
Years	Name	Nation
2011–2012	Jimmy Hamrouni	Tunisia
2012–2014	Colm Muldoon	Ireland

== Honours ==
- CSL II Championship: 2014
- Canadian Soccer League First Division: 2013
- Canadian Soccer League Second Division: 2014

== Year-by-year ==
=== First team ===
Year	Division	League	Reg. season	Playoffs
2011	2nd Division East	Canadian Soccer League	Seventh	DNQ
2012	First Division	Canadian Soccer League	Fourteenth	DNQ
2013	First Division	Canadian Soccer League	First	Finals
2014	First Division	Canadian Soccer League	Third	Semi-finals

=== Second team ===
Year	Division	League	Reg. season	Playoffs
2012	Second Division	Canadian Soccer League	Eleventh	DNQ
2013	Second Division	Canadian Soccer League	Eighth	Q
2014	Second Division	Canadian Soccer League	First	Q

== Stadium ==
Kingston FC played its home games on artificial turf at the Queen's University West Campus Field, located in Kingston at the corner of Johnson Street and Sir John A. Macdonald Boulevard, just west of the Queen's University Main Campus. With bleacher seating of 600 supporters, the West Campus turf field provided Kingston FC with a central Kingston home field accessible to young fans and families. The successor club, the Quinte-Belleville Royals Soccer Club intends to take the field in 2016 and to play its home games in League1 Ontario on the artificial turf field at M.A. Sills Park on Palmer Road in Belleville.
