= Canadian Soccer League championship final =

Annual professional soccer tournament

Canadian Soccer League championship
- Founded: 1998
- Region: Canada
- Current champions: Scarborough SC (4th title)
- Most championships: Toronto Croatia (6 times)
- Website: canadiansoccerleague.ca
- 2026 season

The Canadian Soccer League championship final, or CSL Championship, is the post-season match of the Canadian Soccer League (CSL) and is the successor to the CNSL Championship. The winner is crowned champion as in other North American sports leagues (i.e. via a playoff following a regular season). This differs from other top soccer leagues, which consider the club with the most points at the end of the season to be the sole champion. It is a Non-FIFA championship match that was previously sanctioned by the Canadian Soccer Association (CSA) but is now affiliated with the Soccer Federation of Canada (SFC).

The league hosted its inaugural championship on October 14, 1998. The CSL Championship is traditionally held in early October. Toronto Croatia is the most successful team, winning a record sixth cup in 2015.

Throughout its history, the championship has had several title sponsors, from the Primus Cup in 2000, the Rogers Cup from 2001 to 2009, and the Givova Cup from 2010 onwards.

== History ==
In the initial years, the championship finals were dominated by Toronto Olympians and Ottawa Wizards, who had financial support from corporations such as Coffee Time and Oz Optics Ltd. St. Catharines Wolves and Toronto Croatia, two well-established former Canadian National Soccer League (CNSL) clubs, were the prominent challengers in the early years. The inaugural championship was contested between the 1997 CNSL champions, St. Catharines, and Toronto Olympians, with the Wolves securing the title in a penalty shootout. St. Catharines would conclude their golden decade in 2001 with their second championship against the Toronto Supra. While the Olympians appeared in the first three CPSL Championship finals, but only managed one victory in 1999 against Toronto Croatia. The Croatians would avenge their defeat the following season after defeating the Olympians 2–0.

In 2000, the championship received its first title sponsorship from Primus and witnessed the emergence of the Ottawa Wizards after the league's major expansion run in 2001. The heavily invested Wizards would dominate the next three seasons with an eventual championship in 2002. After a series of disputes with the CPSL board of directors, Ottawa withdrew from the playoff competition after securing an undefeated regular season in 2003. As a result, this created an opportunity for various clubs to contend for the championship, with the Brampton Hitmen claiming the title. After the decline and departure of the Olympians, Wizards, and Wolves, a shift occurred with Croatia and York Region Shooters (then as the Vaughan Shooters, later as Italia Shooters) achieving a powerhouse status as both champions and top contenders, with the Serbian White Eagles as the prominent challengers. The re-emergence of the White Eagles re-sparked the traditional rivalry between Croatia and Serbia, which caused the 2007 championship final to be divided into two matches to segregate the fans.

Toronto Croatia currently holds the record amount of six championships and holds the distinction of being the first club to successfully defend the title in two consecutive seasons from 2014 to 2015. As the league expanded beyond the Greater Toronto Area and the Ontario border, a television agreement was reached with Rogers TV, which granted the company naming rights to the championship. In 2010, Givova became the title sponsor for the league and championship. Meanwhile, another milestone was achieved by Trois-Rivières Attak, the farm team of the Montreal Impact, as it became the first Quebec club to capture the championship in 2009 after defeating Serbia in a 3-2 penalty shootout. Other single champions have included the likes of the Oakville Blue Devils, Brantford Galaxy, and SC Waterloo Region. In 2014, York Region became the second club in the league's history to produce a perfect season, following the Toronto Olympians since the 1999 season.

== Format ==
After the regular season, the top eight finishers qualify for the playoffs. Those then consist of quarter-finals, semi-finals, and the championship final. Except for the 2007 final, which was contested over two legs, the final is generally played in a single match.

== Champions ==
The winner of the Canadian Soccer League's championship determines the season's overall champion. The playoff tournament is organized by the league after the regular season in a format similar to other North American professional sports leagues.

The first CSL Championship final was played on October 14, 1998. As of 2017, the record for the most championships is held by Toronto Croatia with six cup titles. The record for the most championships lost is held by Scarborough SC and the Serbian White Eagles, who have lost the game four times during their history.

=== Results ===
Season	Date	Champions	Final Score	Runners-up	Venue
1998	October 14	St. Catharines Wolves	2–2 †	Toronto Olympians	Centennial Park Stadium
1999	October 2	**Toronto Olympians**	2–0	Toronto Croatia	Oshawa Civic Stadium
2000	October 1	Toronto Croatia	2–1	**Toronto Olympians**	Cove Road Stadium
2001	October 14	St. Catharines Wolves	1–0	Toronto Supra	Club Roma Stadium
2002	October 20	**Ottawa Wizards**	2–0	North York Astros	Esther Shiner Stadium
2003	October 5	Brampton Hitmen	1–0	Vaughan Shooters	Cove Road Stadium
2004	October 11	Toronto Croatia	4–0	Vaughan Shooters	Victoria Park Stadium
2005	November 10	Oakville Blue Devils	2–1 *	**Vaughan Shooters**	Esther Shiner Stadium
2006	October 15	Italia Shooters	1–0	**Serbian White Eagles**	Esther Shiner Stadium
2007	October 27; October 28	Toronto Croatia	4–1; 0–0	**Serbian White Eagles**	Esther Shiner Stadium
2008	October 26	Serbian White Eagles	2–2 †	**Trois-Rivieres Attak**	Esther Shiner Stadium
2009	October 24	**Trois-Rivieres Attak**	0–0 †	Serbian White Eagles	BMO Field
2010	October 31	Brantford Galaxy	3–0	Hamilton Croatia	Centennial Park Stadium
2011	October 29	Toronto Croatia	1–0	Capital City F.C.	Centennial Park Stadium
2012	October 27	**Toronto Croatia**	1–0	Montreal Impact Academy	Centennial Park Stadium
2013	November 3	SC Waterloo Region	3–1	**Kingston FC**	Kalar Sports Park
2014	October 26	**York Region Shooters**	1–1 †	Toronto Croatia	Esther Shiner Stadium
2015	October 25	Toronto Croatia	1–0	SC Waterloo Region	Warrior Field
2016	October 30	Serbian White Eagles	2–1 *	Hamilton City	Birchmount Stadium
2017	September 30	York Region Shooters	1–1 †	Scarborough SC	Lamport Stadium
2018	October 13	FC Vorkuta	1–1 †	Scarborough SC	Centennial Park Stadium
2019	October 26	Scarborough SC	2–0	FC Ukraine United	Centennial Park Stadium
2020	October 17	FC Vorkuta	2–1	**Scarborough SC**	Racco Park
2021	November 7	Scarborough SC	4–1	**FC Vorkuta**	Centennial Park Stadium
2022	August 27	FC Continentals	2–1	Scarborough SC	Lamport Stadium
2023	Postseason cancelled				
2024	Postseason cancelled				
2025	September 28	**Scarborough SC**	1–0	Serbian White Eagles	Esther Shiner Stadium
2026	August 15; October 4	Scarborough SC	4–0; 1–0	Serbian White Eagles	Esther Shiner Stadium; Rob Ford Stadium

**Key**
*	Match went to extra time
†	Match decided by a penalty shootout after overtime
**Bold**	Team won the **Regular Season Champions**
Italics	Team won the Open Canada Cup

== Performance by Club ==
Club	Champions	Runner-up	Winning years	Losing Years
Toronto Croatia	6	2	2000, 2004, 2007, 2011, 2012, 2015	1999, 2014
Scarborough SC	4	4	2019, 2021, 2025, 2026	2017, 2018. 2020, 2022
York Region Shooters	3	3	2006, 2014, 2017	2003, 2004, 2005
FC Continentals	3	1	2018, 2020, 2022	2021
Serbian White Eagles	2	5	2008, 2016	2006, 2007, 2009, 2025, 2026
St. Catharines Wolves	2	–	1998, 2001	–
Toronto Olympians	1	2	1999	1998, 2000
Trois-Rivières Attak	1	1	2009	2008
SC Waterloo Region	1	1	2013	2015
Brampton Stallions	1	–	2003	–
Brantford Galaxy	1	–	2010	–
Oakville Blue Devils	1	–	2005	–
Ottawa Wizards	1	–	2002	–
SC Toronto	–	1	–	2001
North York Astros	–	1	–	2002
Hamilton Croatia	–	1	–	2010
Capital City F.C.	–	1	–	2011
Montreal Impact Academy	–	1	–	2012
Kingston FC	–	1	–	2013
Hamilton City	–	1	–	2016
