= Canadian Athletic Therapists Association =

Canadian professional body

The Canadian Athletic Therapists Association (CATA) is a professional body based in Calgary, Alberta, Canada, which was established on April 24, 1965 at a meeting at Maple Leaf Gardens in Toronto, Ontario, Canada.

== History ==
The Canadian Athletic Therapists Association (CATA) is the professional governing body of Certified Athletic Therapists in Canada. The CATA was established on April 24, 1965 at a meeting at Maple Leaf Gardens in Toronto, Ontario. In June 1965, in Chicago at the site of the National Athletic Trainers' Association (NATA) meeting, the first meeting of the CATA was held. In 1966 the CATA held it first annual meeting on Canadian soil in Toronto. The CATA has continued to hold annual meetings at their National Conference. CATA originally stood for Canadian Athletic Trainers' Association, and the word Trainers' was dropped in favor of Therapists to represent the changing landscape of Sport in Canada. During the first meeting, the first executive board was selected. The first President of the CATA was Mert Prophet. The current president of the CATA is Kirsten Kidd. A new President-Elect is chosen annually; at the CATA Annual Members Meeting; along with other executives in the Association.

There are currently nine CATA Accredited Athletic Therapy programs in Canada. The Athletic Therapy program at Sheridan College was the first program of its kind in Canada, and was founded in 1973. Acadia University was the most recently added institution, receiving full accreditation in 2022.

== Certified Athletic Therapist ==
A Certified Athletic Therapist or CAT(C) is a health care professional that provides care to the active individual through assessment, prevention, emergency care, and rehabilitation of sports related injuries. Along with other members of the health care system, the Athletic Therapist can help provide an optimal environment for healing to occur and return an individual to an active and healthy lifestyle. The Certified Athletic Therapist uses a variety of rehabilitative techniques, supportive taping and bracing, Therapeutic modalities and rehabilitative and strengthening programs to ensure their athletes and clients have a safe return to sport participation.

Certified Athletic Therapists have an extensive educational background in the following areas: HumanAnatomy and Physiology, Injury Prevention, Care, Assessment/Evaluation, Pre-hospital Emergency assessment and management, Risk Management/Health Care Administration, General Medical Conditions, Pharmacology, Physics, Therapeutic modalities, Nutrition, Psychology, Kinesiology, and Biomechanics.

Certified Athletic Therapists also have extensive education and training in:

1. The thorough assessment and appropriate management of concussions, heat-related emergencies, MRSA, and sudden cardiac death
2. Equipment fitting, maintenance, and emergency removal
3. Supportive taping and bracing application
4. Making appropriate and unbiased sideline return to play decisions
5. Comprehensive injury management from onset of injury, through injury rehabilitation, to appropriate return to play

Certified Athletic Therapists should not be confused with Certified Athletic Trainer, "Trainer", Personal Trainer, or Physiotherapists.

== Certification Candidates ==
A Certification Candidate is a member of the CATA. They are non-voting members, usually students, that are working towards their certification. Certification A certification candidate must attend and graduate from one of the nineaccredited institutions across Canada.

== Certification ==
In order to become a Certified Athletic Therapist, an individual must successfully complete an academic program at one of the accredited post secondary institutions. These schools include: Mount Royal University (Calgary), Concordia University (Montreal), Camosun College, York University, Sheridan College, University of Winnipeg, University of Manitoba, Université du Québec à Trois-Rivières and Acadia University (Nova Scotia). They must then pass The Canadian Board of Certification in Athletic Therapy National Certification Exam, which is held twice a year, in June and November. Certification Candidates must have a valid First Responder Certificate at the time they apply for the National Certification Exam. The national certification exam consists of a comprehensive written exam. The minimum passing level (MPL) required to pass each component of the exam is calculated using MPL Standard Setting techniques (Modified Angoff, Modified Ebel) . The NCE is intended to measure a Certification Candidate's knowledge, skills, and attitudes in all aspects of the profession of Athletic Therapy including: pre-hospital emergency assessment and management, orthopaedic injury assessment, contemporary rehabilitation techniques (therapeutic modalities, manual therapy, therapeutic exercise, strength and conditioning, etc.), supportive taping/bracing, sport equipment fitting and emergency removal, and educational counselling (sport psychology, sport nutrition, etc.).

== Provincial chapters ==
The CATA has several provincial chapters: Athletic Therapists' Association of British Columbia, Alberta Athletic Therapists Association, Ontario Athletic Therapists Association, Saskatchewan Athletic Therapists Association, Atlantic Provinces Athletic Therapists Association, Corporation des Thérapeutes du Sport du Québec/Quebec Corporation of Athletic Therapists, Manitoba Athletic Therapists Association

== Employment opportunities ==
Private Clinics

Athletic Therapists work on a fee for service basis in private Athletic Therapy Clinics, Sports Medicine Clinics and Multi-disciplinary Clinics across Canada.

Public Health Care System

Athletic Therapists work within the public health care system such as hospitals, as orthopaedic specialists and exercise specialists.

Private Ergonomic Companies

Athletic Therapists are hired by different companies to provide ergonomic consultations to employees who perform manual labor, who are required to perform heaving lifting, or who work long hours at a desk.

University/Colleges

Athletic Therapists work as part of the medical staff providing their services to varsity athletes in Universities and Colleges across Canada.

Community sport organizations

Athletic Therapists work as the medical staff for formal sport organizations and informal sport groups at all levels (community/neighbourhood, regional, and or provincial). In some instances where the athletic therapist is the only support staff, some practitioners learn other sport-related skills that broaden their skill set: skate sharpening, equipment maintenance, etc.

Professional Sports Teams

Athletic Therapists can be found as members of the medical team for a variety of different sporting organizations in the National Football League, Canadian Football League, National Basketball Association, Major League Baseball, and Cirque du Soleil.

National Athletes and Teams

Athletic Therapists work as members of the medical team for National teams in sports like hockey, basketball, softball and others; and at events like Canada Games, or Provincial Games. They can be found working on the medical staff for International events like the Olympics, Pan Am Games, and Commonwealth Games

== Mutual recognition agreement ==
In 2005, the National Athletic Trainers' Association Board of Certification and the CATA signed a mutual recognition agreement. This allows certified members of both associations to take each other's exams, and creates opportunities for those who pass the certification exams to work in both countries. In 2019, the CATA stepped out of this agreement.

== See also ==
- Athletic training
- Sports medicine
- Exercise physiology
- Kinesiology
- Sport psychology
- Orthopedics
- Sports injuries
- Massage
- Osteopathy
- Physical therapy
- Motor learning
- Pathology
- Health
- Exercise equipment
- Board of Certification, Inc.
