= Cata =

Cata, CATA or catá may refer to:

== People ==
- Alfonso Catá (1937 – 1990), Cuban ballet dancer
- Larry Catá Backer (born 1955), Cuban-American legal scholar
- Cata Díaz (born 1979), Argentine footballer
- El Cata, Dominican singer

== Places ==
- Cața, a commune in Braşov County, Romania
- Bahía de Cata (Bay of Cata), Venezuela

== Transport ==
- Cape Ann Transportation Authority, public transit system in Gloucester, Massachusetts
- Capital Area Transportation Authority, public transit system in Lansing, Michigan
- Centre Area Transportation Authority, public transit system in State College, Pennsylvania
- CATA Línea Aérea, Argentine airline

== Institutions ==
- Canadian Athletic Therapists Association, Canadian professional body
- Central Academy of Technology and Arts
- Central Asian Treaty Alliance, a fictional alliance in the Project Reality modification for Battlefield 2

== Other ==
- Catá, Cuban percussion instrument
- Mordella cata, species of beetle
- Periploca cata, species of moth

== See also ==
- Catastrophe (disambiguation)
