= David G. Maloney =

American oncologist

David G. Maloney (born 25 November 1954) is an oncologist and researcher at Fred Hutchinson Cancer Research Center and the University of Washington who specializes in developing targeted immunotherapies for the treatment of blood cancers.

He is the medical director for cellular immunotherapy at Fred Hutch and the Bezos Family Immunotherapy Clinic at Seattle Cancer Care Alliance, which is dedicated to providing immunotherapies for cancer patients in clinical trials.

== Education and career ==
Maloney earned his Bachelor of Science in chemistry and biochemistry 1977 from Whitworth University in Spokane, Washington. He earned an M.D. from Stanford University in 1985 and a Ph.D. from Stanford in 1991. As a medical student at Stanford, Maloney was a member of the lab of Ronald Levy. He completed an internship and residency in internal medicine at Brigham and Women's Hospital and a fellowship in oncology at Stanford University Medical Center.

Maloney joined the faculties of Fred Hutchinson Cancer Research Center and the University of Washington, both in Seattle, Washington, in 1994.

In addition to his research, he treats patients with chronic lymphocytic leukemia, non-Hodgkin lymphoma and multiple myeloma at Seattle Cancer Care Alliance. He is board-certified in internal medicine.

== Research ==
Maloney has authored more than 200 peer-reviewed scientific publications over the course of his career, including dozens as first or senior author, as well as numerous expert reviews.

Maloney was part of the team that first demonstrated the potential of monoclonal antibodies as cancer therapeutics. He led the initial clinical trials of the drug that resulted from the team's research, later known as rituximab, which demonstrated its safety and activity against CD20-positive B cells in patients with lymphoma. In 1997, rituximab became the first monoclonal antibody drug for cancer on the market, revolutionizing treatment for B-cell non-Hodgkin lymphoma. Further research by Maloney has continued to develop antibody-based therapeutic strategies for blood cancers.

In the field of hematopoietic stem cell transplantation, Maloney has played a role in the development of lower-toxicity, non-myeloablative techniques for the treatment of blood cancers.

Building on his expertise with antibody-based cancer therapy and reduced-toxicity treatment approaches, Maloney is developing adoptive T cell therapy for cancer using chimeric antigen receptors, or CARs, synthetic versions of T-cell receptors that incorporate cancer-targeting antibodies, which allow the immune cells to specifically target cancer cells. Maloney leads an early-phase clinical trial for patients with certain advanced, treatment-resistant CD19-positive B-cell cancers, in which patients' CD4+ and CD8+ T cells are genetically engineered to express a CD19-specific CAR. Preliminary results point toward high rates of remission after CAR T-cell infusion.

== Personal life ==
Maloney grew up in Yakima, Washington. He and his wife, Susan, have two children.

== Honors ==
Maloney was named Young Investigator Presidential Award from the International Society for Biological Therapy of Cancer (now the Society for Immunotherapy of Cancer) in 1993. He has been included several times in the Castle Connolly Guides, "America's Top Doctors" and "America's Top Doctors for Cancer", and was named the first Leonard and Norma Klorfine Endowed Chair for Clinical Research at Fred Hutch in 2016.

== Selected publications ==
- Miller RA, Maloney DG, Warnke, R, Levy R (1982) Treatment of B-cell lymphoma with monoclonal anti-idiotype antibody, The New England Journal of Medicine, 309, 517-552.
- Maloney, D., Liles, T., Czerwinski, D., Waldichuk, C., Rosenberg, J., Grillo-Lopez, A., & Levy, R. (1994). Phase I clinical trial using escalating single-dose infusion of chimeric anti-CD20 monoclonal antibody (IDEC-C2B8) in patients with recurrent B-cell lymphoma. Blood, 84(8), 2457-2466.
- Maloney, D. G., Grillo-López, A. J., Bodkin, D. J., White, C. A., Liles, T. M., Royston, I., Varns, C., Rosenberg, J., & Levy, R. (1997). Journal of Clinical Oncology, 15(10), 3266-3274.
- Maloney, D. G., Grillo-López, A. J., White, C. A., Bodkin, D., Schilder, R. J., Neidhart, J. A., Janakiraman, N., Foon, K. A., Liles, T., Dallaire, B. K., Wey, K., Royston, I., Davis, T., & Levy, R. (1997). IDEC-C2B8 (Rituximab) Anti-CD20 Monoclonal Antibody Therapy in Patients With Relapsed Low-Grade Non-Hodgkin's Lymphoma. Blood, 90(6), 2188-2195.
- Maloney, D. G., Donovan, K., & Hamblin, T. J. (1999). Antibody therapy for treatment of multiple myeloma. Seminars in Hematology, 36(1 Suppl 3):30-33.
- Maloney, D. G. (1999). Preclinical and phase I and II trials of rituximab. Seminars in Oncology, 26 (5 Suppl 14): 74-78.
- Storek, J., Joseph, A., Espino, G., Dawson, M. A., Douek, D. C., Sullivan, K. M., Flowers, M. E., Martin, P., Mathioudakis, G., Nash, R. A., Storb, R., Appelbaum, F. R., & Maloney, D. G. (2001). Immunity of patients surviving 20 to 30 years after allogeneic or syngeneic bone marrow transplantation. Blood, 98(13), 3505-3512.
- Storek, J., Wells, D., Dawson, M. A., Storer, B., & Maloney, D. G. (2001). Factors influencing B lymphopoiesis after allogeneic hematopoietic cell transplantation. Blood, 98(2), 489-491.
- Maloney, D. G. (2003). Graft-vs.-leukemia effect in various histologies of non-Hodgkin's lymphoma. Leukemia & Lymphoma, 44 (sup 3), S99-S105.
- Maloney, D. G., Molina, A. J., Sahebi, F., Stockerl-Goldstein, K. E., Sandmaier, B. M., Bensinger, W., Storer, B., Hegenbart, U., Somlo, G., Chauncey, T., Bruno, B., Appelbaum, F. R., Blume, K. G., Forman, S. J., McSweeney, P., & Storb, R. (2003).Allografting with nonmyeloablative conditioning following cytoreductive autografts for the treatment of patients with multiple myeloma. Blood, 102(9), 3447-3454.
- Maloney, D. G., Smith, B., & Rose, A. (2005). Rituximab: mechanism of action and resistance. Seminars in Oncology, 29 (1 supp 2), 2-9.
- Maloney, D. G. (2005). Immunotherapy for non-Hodgkin's lymphoma: monoclonal antibodies and vaccines. Journal of Clinical Oncology, 10, 6421-6428.
- Burroughs, L. M., O'Donnell, P. V,. Sandmaier, B. M., Storer, B. E., Luznik, L., Symons, H. J., Jones, R. J., Ambinder, R. F., Maris, M. B., Blume, K. G., Niederwieser, D. W., Bruno, B., Maziarz, R. T., Pulsipher, M. A., Petersen, F. B., Storb, R., Fuchs, E. J., Maloney, D.G. (2008). Comparison of outcomes of HLA-matched related, unrelated, or HLA-haploidentical related hematopoietic cell transplantation following nonmyeloablative conditioning for relapsed or refractory Hodgkin lymphoma. Biology of Blood and Marrow Transplantation, 14(11), 1279-1287.
- Bensinger, W., Rotta, M., Storer, B., Chauncey, T., Holmberg, L., Becker, P., Sandmaier, B. M., Storb, R., & Maloney, D. (2012). Allo-SCT for multiple myeloma: a review of outcomes at a single transplant center. Bone Marrow Transplantation, 47, 1312-1317.
- Vaughn, J. E., Sorror, M. L., Storer, B. E., Chauncey, T. R., Pulsipher, M. A., Maziarz, R. T., Maris, M. B., Hari, P., Laport, G. G., Franke, G. N., Agura, E. D., Langston, A. A., Rezvani, A. R., Storb, R., Sandmaier, B. M. & Maloney, D. G. (2015), Long-term sustained disease control in patients with mantle cell lymphoma with or without active disease after treatment with allogeneic hematopoietic cell transplantation after nonmyeloablative conditioning. Cancer, 121: 3709–3716.
- Turtle, C.J., Hanafi, L. A., Berger, C., Hudecek, M., Pender, B., Robinson, E., Hawkins, R., Chaney, C., Cherian, S., Chen, X., Soma, L., Wood, B., Li, D., Heimfeld, S., Riddell, S. R., & Maloney, D. G. (2016). Immunotherapy of non-Hodgkin's lymphoma with a defined ratio of CD8+ and CD4+ CD19-specific chimeric antigen receptor-modified T cells. Science Translational Medicine, 8(355), 355ra116.
- Turtle, C., Riddell, S. & Maloney, D. (2016). CD19-Targeted chimeric antigen receptor-modified T-cell immunotherapy for B-cell malignancies. Clinical Pharmacology & Therapeutics, 100: 252–258. doi:10.1002/cpt.392
- Turtle, C. J., & Maloney, D. G. (2016). Clinical trials of CD19-targeted CAR-modified T cell therapy; a complex and varied landscape. Expert Review of Hematology, 719-721.
