= Whitworth University =

Presbyterian university in Spokane, Washington, US

- Former names: Whitworth College (1890–2007)
- Motto: Education of Mind and Heart
- Type: Private university
- Established: 1890; 136 years ago
- Religious affiliation: Presbyterian Church (USA)
- Endowment: $215.25 million (2025)
- President: Scott McQuilkin
- Provost: John Pell
- Faculty: 149
- Students: 2,814
- Undergraduates: 2,417
- Postgraduates: 372
- Location: 300 W. Hawthorne Road, Country Homes, Washington, 99251, United States; 47.754°N 117.418°W
- Campus: 200 acres; Suburban 200 acres (0.81 km^{2})
- Colors: Crimson, Black
- Nicknames: Pirates, Bucs
- Sporting affiliations: Northwest Conference
- Website: www.whitworth.edu

Whitworth University is a private Christian university that is affiliated with the Presbyterian Church (USA) and located in Spokane, Washington, United States. Founded in 1890, Whitworth enrolls nearly 2,600 students and offers more than 100 graduate and undergraduate programs.

Whitworth competes athletically at the NCAA Division III level in the Northwest Conference as the Pirates. Its colors are black and crimson.

== History ==
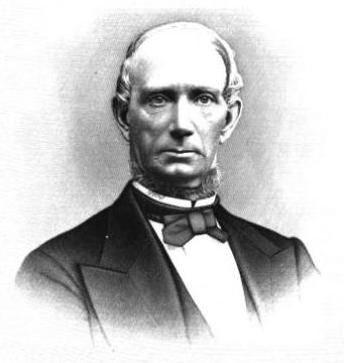
George F. Whitworth around the time he founded the college

In 1883, George F. Whitworth established the "Sumner Academy" in Sumner, a small town in Washington Territory, east of Tacoma. Incorporated as "Whitworth College" in 1890, it relocated to Tacoma in 1899. When a Spokane developer offered land just before World War I, the college moved once more, and classes were held for the first time in Spokane in September 1914. The college relocated due to persistent financial difficulties, local competition from College of Puget Sound and the Pacific Lutheran Academy, and a lack of support from the Washington state Presbyterian Synod or the City of Tacoma. When Whitworth was approached by Spokane boosters, the Spokane Presbytery, and railroad magnate Jay P. Graves with some land on his new Country Homes development outside the city, the trustees agreed to the move provided that the Spokane community donate $70,000 and the Synod of Washington donate $30,000 for facilities. Whitworth merged with Spokane Junior College in 1942, when the latter shut down due to financial difficulties during World War II.

The board of trustees voted to change the institution's name to Whitworth University in 2006, which became effective July 1, 2007.

== Campus ==
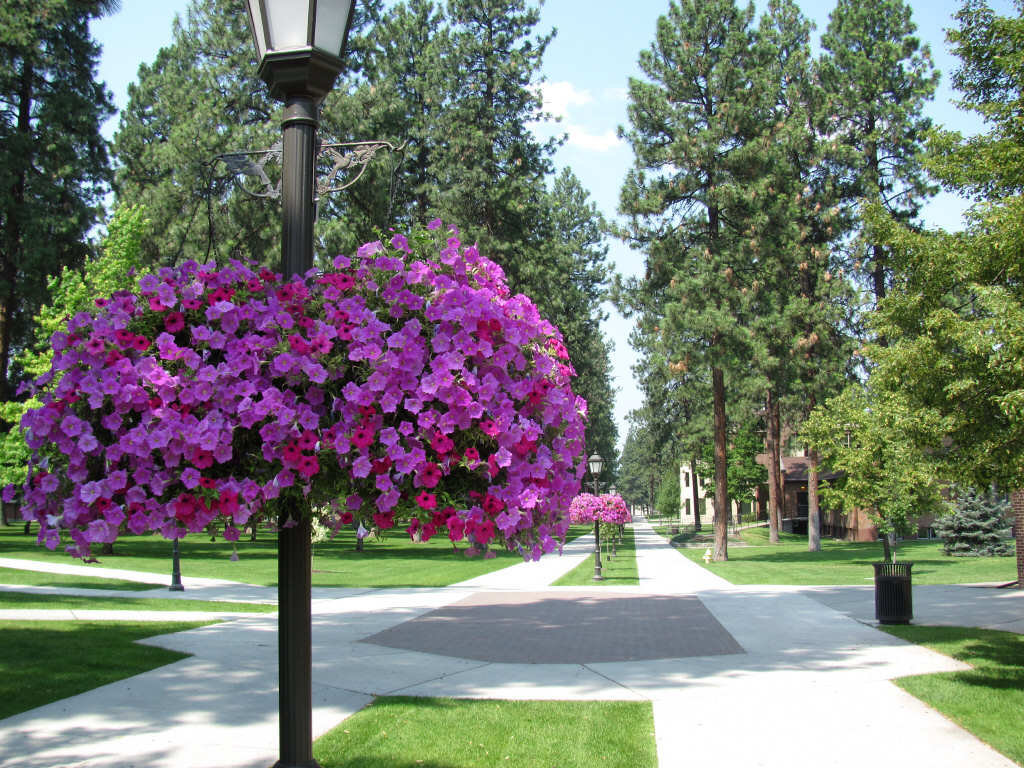
The Loop's Hello Walk

Whitworth's campus in northern Spokane has 200 acres (0.81 km^{2}). In 2009, Whitworth opened a University District (U-District) location near downtown Spokane, expanding program offerings for nontraditional evening students and providing a location with shorter commutes for working professionals.

Due to an expanding student body, the university has invested more than $200 million in campus improvements in recent years. Currently under construction is the new PACCAR Engineering Building, slated to open in January 2026. In 2022, Whitworth completed construction on the new Dana & David Dornsife Health Sciences Building. Additionally, Whitworth completed construction of the Pines Café & Bookstore along Hawthorne Road and the $13 million Whitworth Athletics Leadership Team Center, also known as the WALT.

The university finished renovation on the Megan E. Thompson Aquatic Center in 2019 and completed a renovation of the Beeksma Family Theology Center in 2018, which expanded the Seeley G. Mudd Chapel and provided offices for more than 20 faculty, staff and student employees. In 2015, the university renovated the Cowles Music Center, which remodeled the existing space and added 21,481 square feet (1,996 m^{2}) of new teaching studios, practice rooms, rehearsal rooms, and lobby space.

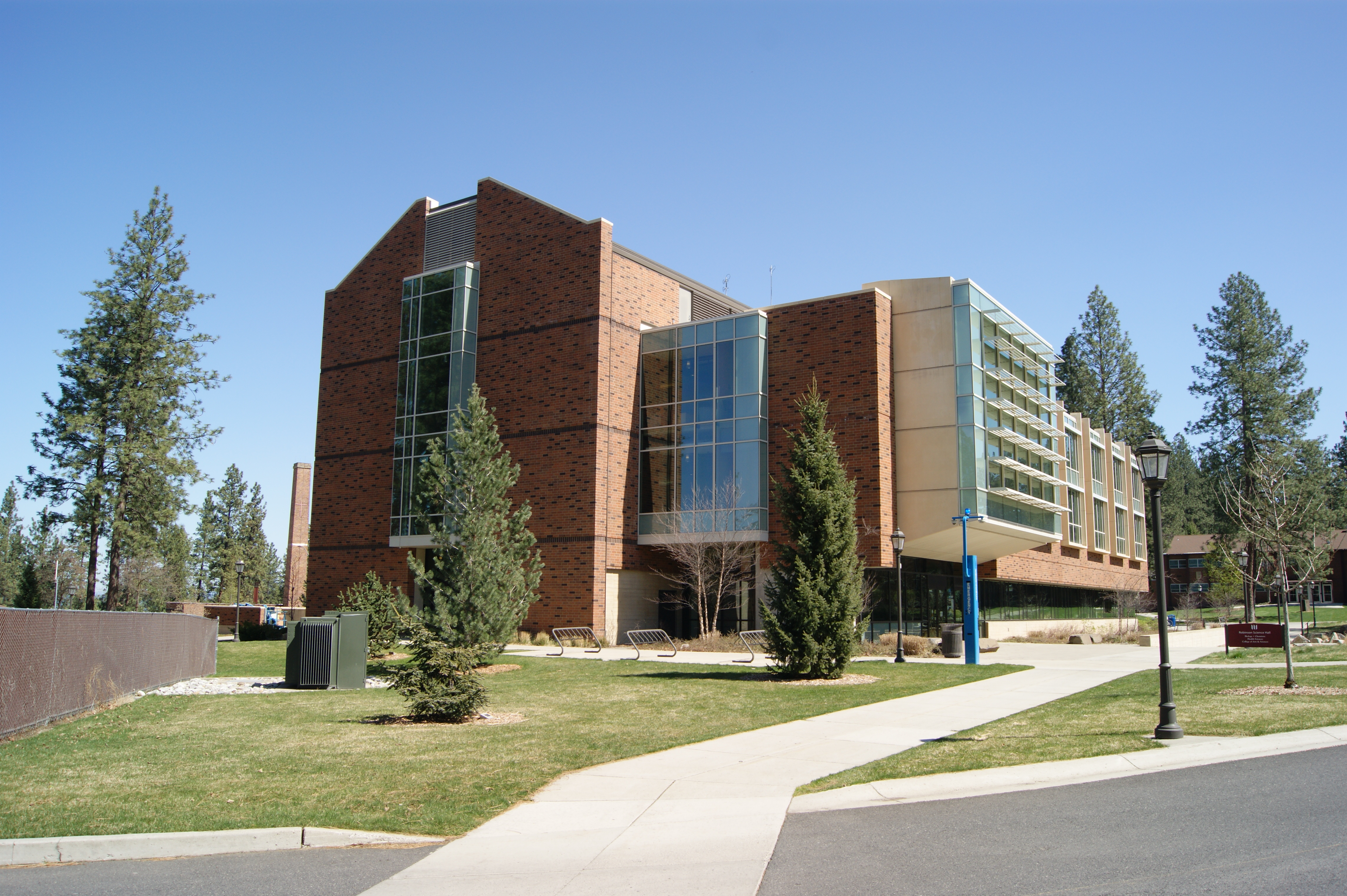
Robinson Science Hall

In 2011, the Robinson Science Hall was dedicated. This 63,000-square-foot (5,900 m^{2}) building was built for biology and chemistry sciences, as well as math courses.

== Academics ==
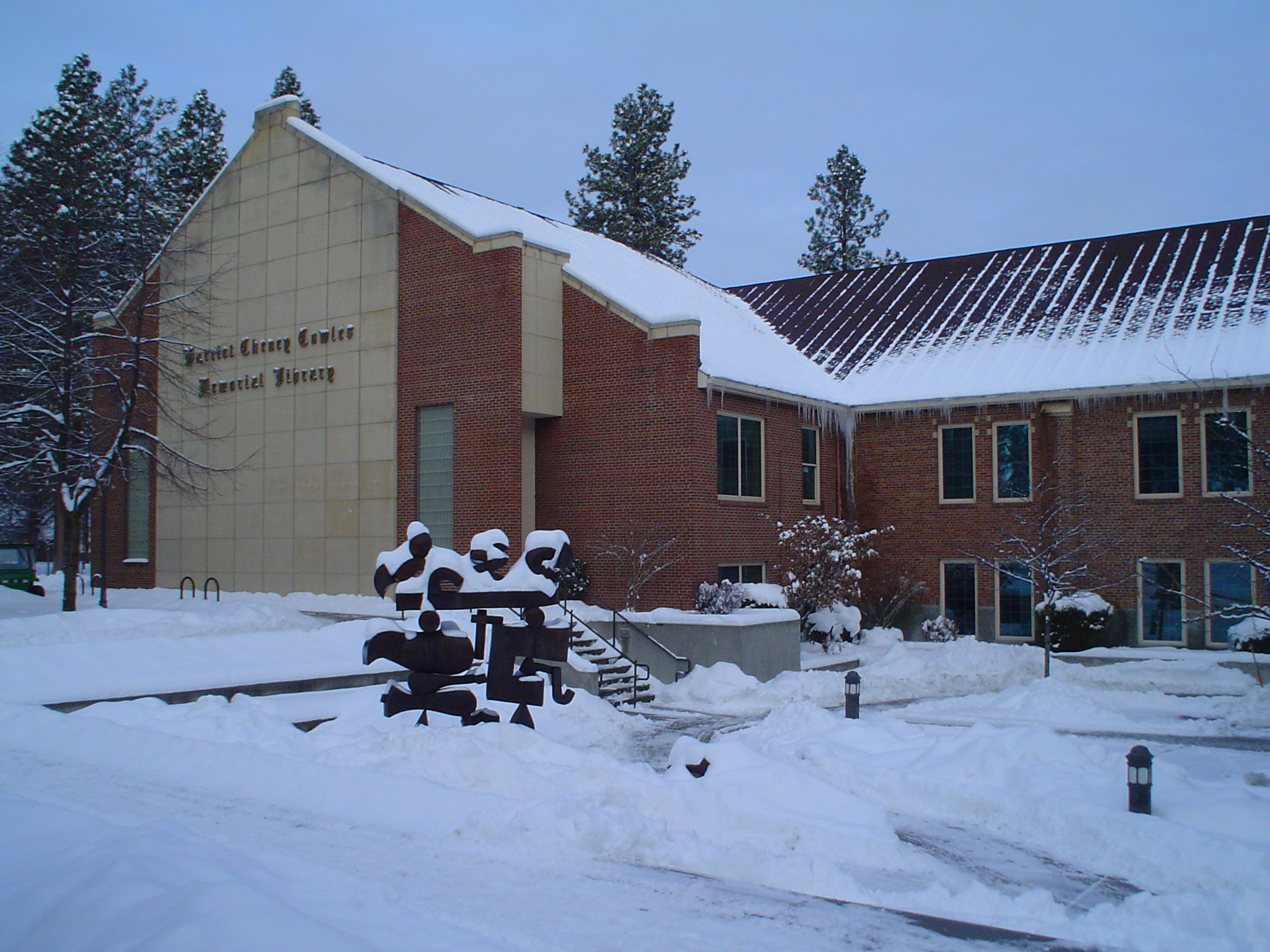
Harriet Cheney Cowles Memorial Library at Whitworth University

Whitworth offers over 100 undergraduate majors and programs, six graduate programs, two doctoral programs and seven adult bachelor's degree completion programs. Academics at Whitworth is organized into five branches:

- The College of Arts and Sciences supports a shared curriculum approach to general education and houses 18 undergraduate arts and science departments. The college offers 47 majors, the M.A in theology and a number of interdisciplinary undergraduate programs, including biology, theology, chemistry, communications, and computer science.
- The School of Business includes undergraduate programs in accounting, business management, economics, finance, and marketing. It also oversees three graduate programs, a Master of Business Administration (MBA), Master of Business Leadership (MBL) and new Master of Science in Financial Planning. The Whitworth School of Business became AACSB accredited in 2020.
- The School of Education includes the Department of Undergraduate Teacher Education; the Department of Graduate Studies in Education; the Master in Teaching (MIT) Program; the Evening Teacher Certification Program; the Center for Gifted Education; and the Special Education Program.
- The School of Continuing Studies provides bachelor's degree programs for non-traditional students through evening degree programs, accelerated-format classes and certificate programs.
- The School of Health Sciences was formed in 2023 to encompass undergraduate degrees in health science (B.S. in health science, B.A. in community health), an M.S. in athletic training and two doctorate degree programs: Doctor of Occupational Therapy (OTD) and Doctor of Physical Therapy (DPT).

The university also offers over 30 study-abroad programs available to students over Jan Term, May Term, or during a full semester. Forty-five percent of Whitworth's 2021 graduates participated in one or more off-campus programs.

=== Rankings and reputation ===
Academic rankings

Master's
- Washington Monthly: 31 of 604

Regional
- U.S. News & World Report: 7 of 105

In 2023, U.S. News & World Report ranked Whitworth 7th of 105 Regional Universities (West). The Princeton Review also named Whitworth one of 79 institutions as "Best in the West" in 2023.

INSIGHT into Diversity Magazine awarded Whitworth the 2020 Higher Education Excellence in Diversity (HEED) Award.

The Arbor Day Foundation recognized Whitworth as a Tree Campus USA from 2018 to 2021.

== Admissions ==
Students on campus represent 29 states and 45 countries. As of 2023, international students make up 4.9 percent of undergraduate enrollment.

== Athletics ==
Whitworth athletics logo

Whitworth's athletics teams are the Pirates. The university offers 21 varsity sports and competes in the Northwest Conference of the National Collegiate Athletic Association (NCAA) Division III. Men's sports include cross country, football, basketball, swimming, track and field (indoor and outdoor), golf, tennis, soccer and baseball; women compete in soccer, volleyball, basketball, swimming, track and field (indoor and outdoor), golf, tennis, lacrosse and softball. Whitworth has played their home football games at the Pine Bowl (an on-campus football stadium) since the 1930s.

Whitworth was in the Washington Intercollegiate Conference and Evergreen Conference before joining the Northwest Conference in 1970.

The field within the Pine Bowl was changed to artificial turf from grass in 2017 and subsequently was dedicated to the parents of the main donors by being named Puryear Field in 2018. Whitworth began playing football in 1904, and has only missed 7 seasons since then, due to World War I (1917–1919) and World War II (1942–1945).

Whitworth has won a total of 13 Northwest Conference McIlroy-Lewis All-Sports Trophies, including the last 12 in a row (2008–2019). Whitworth men's swimming won the Northwest Conference Swimming Championship in 2022.

== Student life ==
The Associated Students of Whitworth University ("ASWU") is in charge of clubs and activities on campus. The ASWU is composed of four executive officers (President, Vice President, Finance Director and Communications Director) who coordinate the student government and lead the student body, several residence hall senators and representatives who represent specific living areas and hold voting power, and coordinators who are responsible for programming in specialized areas.

=== Campus media ===
The Whitworthian is the weekly student newspaper. The paper received the "Best All-Around Non-Daily Student Newspaper" award from the Society of Professional Journalists in 2009.

Natsihi (pronounced "Not-See-Hee) is the Whitworth University yearbook taking its name from the Spokane Native American word meaning "among the pines." Over the years Natsihi has won national awards such as "Best in Show" and "Most Outstanding University Yearbook for 2017" from the Associated Collegiate Press.

== Notable people ==
=== Alumni ===
- Sam Adams, former CFL player for the BC Lions
- Michael Allan (2007), professional football player
- Blaine Bennett, college football head coach at Western Oregon University and Central Washington University
- Richard Carr, Chief of Chaplains of the U.S. Air Force
- Richard Cizik (1973), vice president for governmental affairs for the National Association of Evangelicals, was named one of Time magazine's 100 Most Influential People of 2008
- Paul Dorpat (1963), Washington historian
- Zilfa Estcourt (1904), features writer and women's editor at the Tacoma Ledger, the Tacoma Tribune, and the San Francisco Chronicle
- Leo Ezerins, former CFL player for the Winnipeg Blue Bombers and Hamilton Tiger-Cats
- Brian Fennell, musician who co-founded indie band Barcelona and performs under the name "SYML"
- Sia Figiel, Samoan novelist
- Dave Holmes, college football head coach at Eastern Washington University and University of Hawaiʻi at Mānoa
- Dan Inosanto (1958), Filipino-American martial arts instructor best known as a training partner of Bruce Lee
- Sara Jackson-Holman, singer-songwriter
- Edward Kienholz, American Pop Art installation artist
- Michael K. Le Roy (1989), Former President of Calvin University
- Doug Long, former NFL player for the Seattle Seahawks
- David G. Maloney (1977), physician, scientist and cancer researcher
- Stephen C. Meyer (1981), executive officer and co-founder of the Discovery Institute and former philosophy professor at Whitworth
- Alfred Mutua (1996), cabinet secretary of foreign and diaspora affairs, Kenya; former governor of Machakos County
- David Myers (1964), social psychologist and author
- Jenna Lee Nardella (2004), author and co-founder of Blood: Water Mission
- Kevin C. Parker (1996) owner of Dutch Bros Spokane, adjunct professor at Whitworth University and Gonzaga University. Member of the Washington House of Representatives from 2008 to 2016.
- Ralph Polson (1952), professional basketball player
- Mike Riley (1977, Master's Degree), former University of Nebraska football coach
- B. J. Rosco, composer
- Trevor St. John, American actor on One Life to Live
- Ray Stone (1951), former mayor of Coeur d'Alene, Idaho, bachelor's completed in 1951; master's degree from Whitworth in 1952.
- Ken Sugarman, former CFL player for the BC Lions
- Bob Ward (1955), strength and conditioning coach in the NFL for the Dallas Cowboys. Fullerton College head track coach
- Paul Ward, former NFL player for the Detroit Lions. University of Kentucky head track coach
- Austin Washington, professional soccer player. He transferred to Gonzaga University in 2005
- Ray Washburn (1961), professional baseball player
- Patrice Wilson, record producer
