= Board of Certification, Inc. =

The Board of Certification (BOC) Inc. was originally established in 1970 to set up a program for certifying Athletic Training Students and created qualifications for recertifying current Certified Athletic Trainers. The certification program for entry-level Athletic Trainers was meant to establish standards to meet in order to enter the profession of athletic training.

When the BOC began it was part of the National Athletic Trainers' Association and is now commonly called NATABOC, incorporating both names. In 1989 the BOC became an independent corporation. By 1999 this organization had finished defining the profession of athletic training by completing a role delineation study. Through this study the NATABOC wanted to determine what skills and knowledge should be required in order to perform the daily tasks of a Certified Athletic Trainer (ATC).

== See also ==
- Athletic trainer
