= Nardella =

Nardella is an Italian surname. Notable people with the surname include:

- Bob Nardella (born 1968), Italian-American former professional ice hockey defenseman
- Dario Nardella (born 1975), Italian politician
- Donato Antonio "Don" Nardella (born 1958), Australian politician
- Jena Lee Nardella (born 1982), American author, writer and activist
- Steve Nardella (born 1948), American guitarist
