= Rollande Deslandes =

Canadian university professor

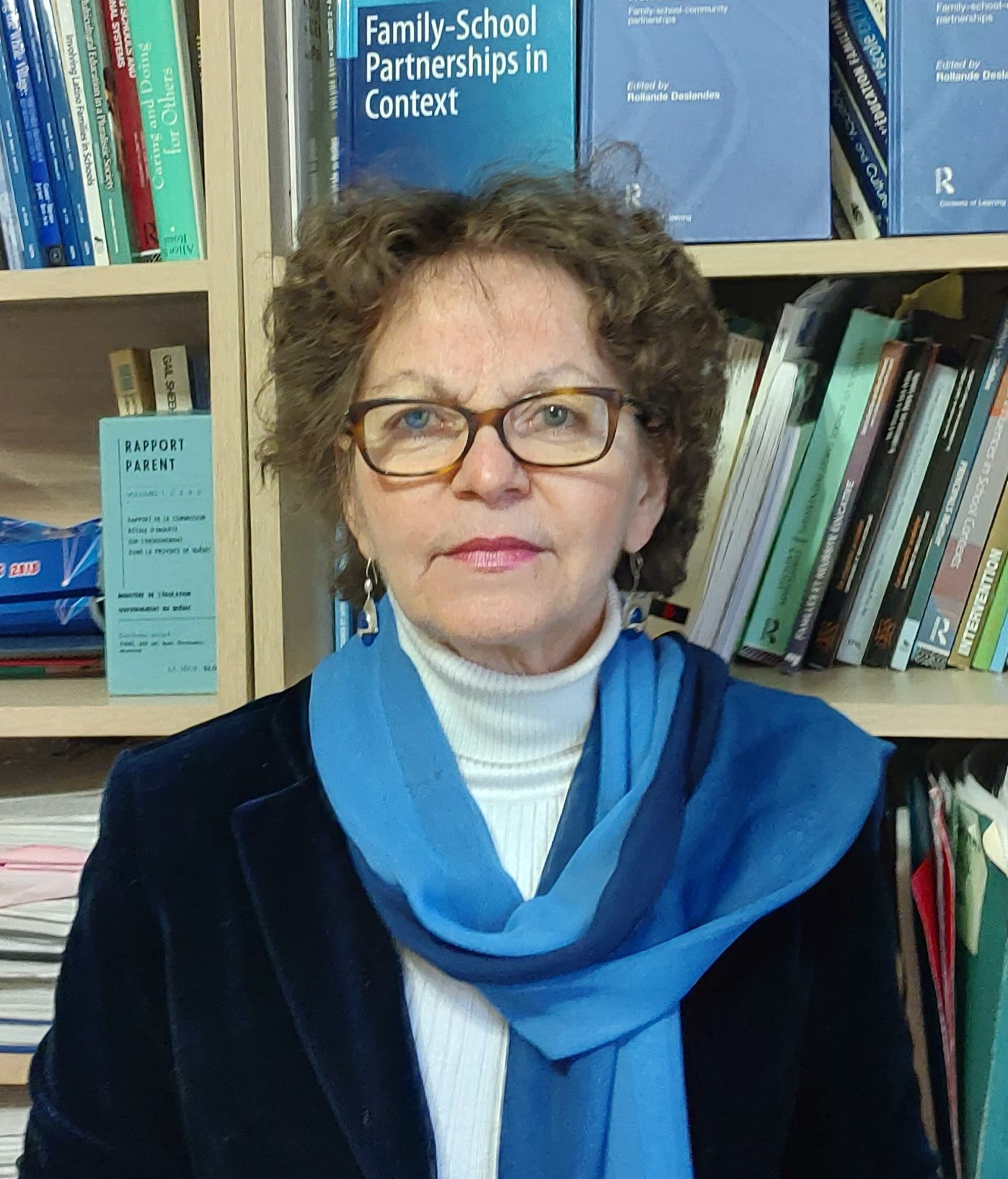
Prof. Rollande Deslandes

Rollande Deslandes is a Canadian university professor of Education Sciences at the University of Quebec in Trois-Rivières. Deslandes is known for her expertise on parenting, parental involvement and relations between schools, families and communities.

== Profession ==
Deslandes obtained a bachelor's degree in education at McGill University in Montreal, then worked as a secondary level and special education teacher for 18 years. She then earned a master's degree in Social Work and a doctorate in Educational Psychology at Laval University in Quebec. She was hired, in 1996, as a professor to pre-service and graduate students and a researcher at the Université du Québec à Trois-Rivières.

Deslandes is the editor of:

- International Perspectives on Contexts, Communities and Evaluated Innovative Practices, published March 28, 2013.
- International Perspectives on Student Outcomes and Homework, published December 12, 2013.

== Career activities ==
Deslandes served as Director of Graduate Studies in Education (2006-2008), and as a commissioner (2012-2015) at the university Research Commission at the university and as commissioner at the provincial Universities Program Evaluation Commission (2012-2015). She acted as the francophone editor of the Canadian Journal of Education (2012-2018). See her last editorial.

More closely linked to research and at the International level, Deslandes was responsible for AIFREF-Canada (Association International de Formation et de Recherche en Éducation Familiale) (2000-2004). She was also elected as an executive board member at Large of the Family-School-Community Partnerships SIG of the American Educational Research Association (AERA) as well as a member of the Dissertation Award Committee (2006-2010). Since 2007, she has been a member of the School Community Journal Advisory Board (USA) and a regular speaker at the European Research Network about Parents in Education (ERNAPE).

== Honors ==
Besides being the recipient of several scholarships at the master's and doctorate levels, Deslandes was the Laureat of the Excellence Award from the Faculty of Social Sciences of Laval University [1992-1993].

In 1996, she was also awarded an Excellence Award for her Doctorat thesis (1997), another one for her research work (2004) and a last one as Emerita for her career as a Researcher.

== Publications ==
Dr. Deslandes is the author and co-author of a great number of publications including, articles, book chapters, reports, etc. She made several presentations in diverse scientific conferences or public forums at the provincial, national and international levels. She was invited in various countries as a professor/ researcher such as France, Uruguay, Brasilia Israel, Australia, Saudi Arabia, and French Polynesia.

Her research interests include mainly family and community involvement in schooling in relation to students’ achievement and other outcomes, like autonomy development, homework completion, and healthy habits.

Some representative publications

- Deslandes, R. (2020). School-Family-Community Collaborations. Retrospective on what has been done and what has been learned. Vol. 1. School-Family Relations.
- Deslandes, R. (2020). School-Family-Community Collaborations. Retrospective on what has been done and what has been learned. Vol.2. School-Community Relations.
- Deslandes, R. (2019). A Framework for school-family collaboration integrating some relevant factors and processes. Aula Abierta 48 (1), 11–18.
- Deslandes, R., & Barma, S. (2018). The Challenge of Improving Homework Processes and Benefits: Insights from Two Intervention Research Sessions with Teachers and Parents of an Elementary School. International Journal about Parents in Education 10(1), 47–58.
- Deslandes, R., & Barma, S. (2016). Revisiting the Challenges Linked to Parenting and Home–School Relationships at the High School Level. Canadian Journal of Education 39(4), 1-32.
- Deslandes, R et Rousseau, M. (2008). Long-term students' management strategies and parental involvement in homework. International Journal of Parents in Education 2(1), 13–24.
- Deslandes, R. (2006). Designing and implementing school, family and community partnerships programs in Quebec, Canada. The School Community Journal 16 (1), 81–105.
- Deslandes, R. & Bertrand, R. (2005). Parent involvement in schooling at the secondary level : Examination of the motivations. The Journal of Educational Research. 98 (3), 164–175.
- Deslandes, R. & Cloutier, R. (2002). Adolescents' perception of parental school involvement. School Psychology International 23 (2), 220–232.
- Deslandes, R., Royer, É., Potvin, P. & Leclerc, D. (1999). Patterns of home-school-community partnership for regular and special education students at the secondary level. The Council for Exceptional Children, 65, 496–506.
- Deslandes, R., Royer, É., Turcotte, D. & Bertrand, R. (1997). School achievement at the secondary level: Influence of parenting style and parent involvement in schooling. McGill Journal of Education, 32(3), 191–208.
