= Anthropomaximology =

Field of study

According to the International Federation of Kinesiology, anthropomaximology is the study of the anatomy, physiology, and mechanics of body movement, especially in humans, and its application to the evaluation and treatment of muscular imbalance or derangement. The concept was developed in the USSR during the 1970s–1980s as a result of numerous Olympic victories. The Soviets utilized anthropomaximology in their athletic training, combining rigorous physical exercise with mental training techniques which allowed the competitors to tap into "hidden reserves" and surpass other athletes' endurance.
