= Nancy Forde =

Canadian biophysicist

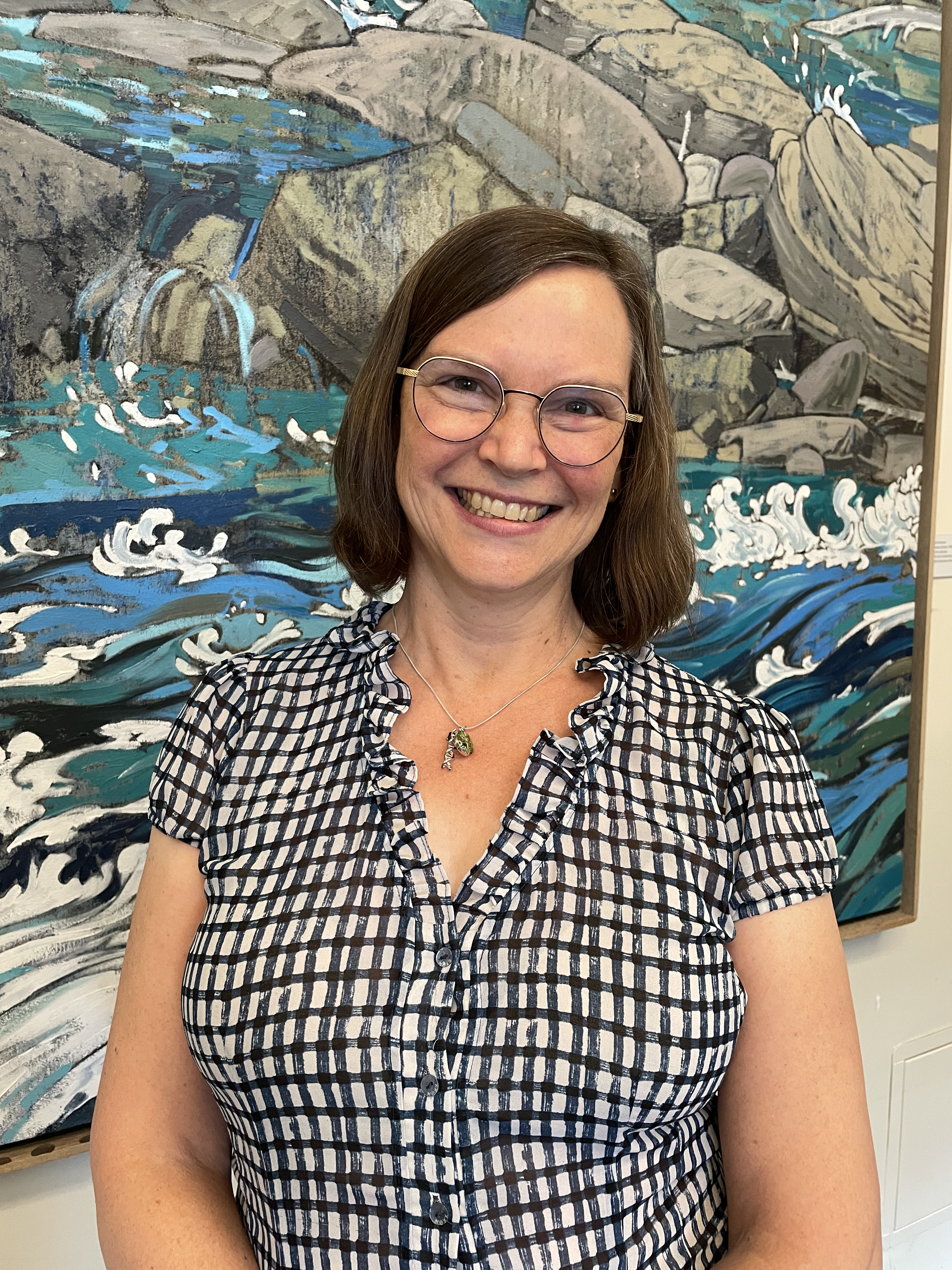
- Scientist Nancy Forde at the 2026 Frontiers in Biophysics Conference
- Education: University of Toronto; University of Chicago
- Known for: Biophysics
- Scientific career
- Workplaces: Simon Fraser University

Nancy Roberta Forde is a Canadian biophysicist whose research involves the use of optical tweezers to probe the mechanical forces operating on biomolecules at the scale of individual molecules, including both natural materials such as collagen and artificial molecular machines. She is a professor and graduate chair in the Department of Physics at Simon Fraser University.

== Education and career ==
Forde majored in chemical physics at the University of Toronto, graduating with honours in 1994. She went to the University of Chicago for graduate study in physical chemistry, where she received a master's degree in 1995 and completed a Ph.D. in 1999 with the dissertation Intramolecular Vibrations and Electronically Nonadiabatic Dynamics in Photodissociation Reactions.

After postdoctoral research at the University of California, Berkeley and Howard Hughes Medical Institute in Berkeley, California, she joined Simon Fraser University as an assistant professor of physics in 2004. She was promoted to associate professor in 2011 and full professor in 2017.

== Recognition ==
Forde was a 2018 recipient of the Michèle Auger Award for Exceptional Service of the Biophysical Society of Canada. She was the 2022 recipient of Simon Fraser University's Excellence in Teaching Award, its "most prestigious award for teaching".

In 2023 Dr. Forde received the Simon Fraser University Award for Excellence in Supervision for embracing the principles of Diversity, Equity, and Inclusion and commitment to her students in ensuring a welcoming and supportive environment for all in graduate school.

Forde was named as a Fellow of the American Physical Society (APS) in 2024, after a nomination from the APS Division of Biological Physics, "for contributions to the understanding of collagen mechanics and the assembly, development, and characterization of synthetic molecular motors; advances in biophysical instrumentation; and scientific leadership in the biophysics community".

In 2025 Canadian Association of Physicists (CAP) recognized Dr. Forde's contributions to "enhancing the learning experience of her students through innovative teaching methods, involvement in curriculum development, and an impressive record of undergraduate research mentorship" with the CAP Medal for Excellence in Teaching Undergraduate Physics.
