= Robert Oristaglio =

American golfer

Robert Oristaglio III (born November 3, 1977) is an American professional golfer (long drive), and the founder of the athletic training company, Ultimate Athletes Inc. His swing speed has been clocked at over 125 mph.

== Early life ==
Oristaglio was born in Philadelphia, Pennsylvania to Dr. Robert P. Oristaglio, a cardiologist, and Susan Sullivan, a dental hygienist. Oristaglio graduated from Malvern Preparatory School in 1995. He would then attend Barry University and graduate at the top of his class with a degree in exercise science in 1999. Oristaglio would then go on to complete the required coursework for degrees in both biology and athletic training. In 2003, he earned his MBA at Lynn University. Upon graduating from Lynn, he briefly attended Medical School at Nova Southeastern University.

== Ultimate Athletes Inc. ==
In November 2003, Oristaglio founded Ultimate Athletes Inc., a biomechanically based sport specific training company. In 2004, Oristaglio was selected by Nike, Inc., to serve as a strength and conditioning consultant to the Nike SPARQ division. In 2011, Ultimate Athletes Inc. purchased BURST Athletics.

== Golf career ==
Since 2006, Oristaglio has participated in over 20 Long Drive Competitions. In 2009, Oristaglio placed in the top ten at the Texas Two Step, earning him a place in the 2009 World Finals in Mesquite, Nevada. Oristaglio has recorded the longest drives of several long drive tournaments.
