= Periploca labes =

Scientific classification
- Domain: Eukaryota
- Kingdom: Animalia
- Phylum: Arthropoda
- Class: Insecta
- Order: Lepidoptera
- Family: Cosmopterigidae
- Genus: Periploca
- Species: P. labes

Binomial name
- Periploca labes Hodges, 1969

Species of moth

Periploca labes is a moth in the family Cosmopterigidae. It was described by Ronald W. Hodges in 1969. It is found in North America, where it has been recorded from Arizona.

The wingspan is about 7 mm. The forewings and hindwings are shining, pale yellowish white, the forewings dusted with light brown scales. Adults have been recorded on wing in July.
