= Periploca (moth) =

Scientific classification
- Domain: Eukaryota
- Kingdom: Animalia
- Phylum: Arthropoda
- Class: Insecta
- Order: Lepidoptera
- Family: Cosmopterigidae
- Subfamily: Chrysopeleiinae
- Genus: Periploca; Braun, 1919

Genus of moths

Periploca is a genus of moths in the family Cosmopterigidae.

== Species ==
- Periploca arsa Hodges, 1978
- Periploca atrata Hodges, 1962
- Periploca cata Hodges, 1962
- Periploca ceanothiella (Cosens, 1908)
- Periploca darwini B. Landry, 2001
- Periploca dentella Hodges, 1978
- Periploca devia Hodges, 1969
- Periploca dipapha Hodges, 1969
- Periploca facula Hodges, 1962
- Periploca fessa Hodges, 1962
- Periploca funebris Hodges, 1962
- Periploca gleditschiaeella (Chambers, 1876) (syn: Periploca gleditschiaeela Hodges, 1962)
- Periploca gulosa Hodges, 1962
- Periploca hortatrix Hodges, 1969
- Periploca hostiata Hodges, 1969
- Periploca intermedia Hodges, 1978
- Periploca juniperi Hodges, 1978
- Periploca labes Hodges, 1969
- Periploca laeta Hodges, 1962
- Periploca longipenis B. Landry, 2001
- Periploca mimula Hodges, 1962
- Periploca nigra Hodges, 1962
- Periploca opinatrix Hodges, 1969
- Periploca orichalcella (Clemens, 1864) (syn: Eriphia concolorella Chambers, 1875, Periploca purpuriella Braun, 1919)
- Periploca otrebla H.A. Vargas, 2003
- Periploca palaearcticella Sinev, 1986
- Periploca repanda Hodges, 1978
- Periploca serrulata Hodges, 1978
- Periploca soror Hodges, 1978
- Periploca teres Hodges, 1978
- Periploca tridens Hodges, 1978
