= Periploca otrebla =

Scientific classification
- Kingdom: Animalia
- Phylum: Arthropoda
- Class: Insecta
- Order: Lepidoptera
- Family: Cosmopterigidae
- Genus: Periploca
- Species: P. otrebla

Binomial name
- Periploca otrebla H.A. Vargas, 2003

Species of moth

Periploca otrebla is a moth in the family Cosmopterigidae. It was described by H.A. Vargas in 2003. It is found in Chile (Azapa Valley, Chaca valley).

The larvae feed on the leaves of Acacia macracantha.
