= Periploca atrata =

Scientific classification
- Domain: Eukaryota
- Kingdom: Animalia
- Phylum: Arthropoda
- Class: Insecta
- Order: Lepidoptera
- Family: Cosmopterigidae
- Genus: Periploca
- Species: P. atrata

Binomial name
- Periploca atrata Hodges, 1962

Species of moth

Periploca atrata, the juniper cone moth, is a moth in the family Cosmopterigidae. It was described by Ronald W. Hodges in 1962. It is found in the United States, where it has been recorded from Arizona and California.

Adults have been recorded on wing from April to May and from July to August.

The larvae feed on the berries of Juniperus californica and Juniperus deppeana.
