= Periploca juniperi =

Scientific classification
- Domain: Eukaryota
- Kingdom: Animalia
- Phylum: Arthropoda
- Class: Insecta
- Order: Lepidoptera
- Family: Cosmopterigidae
- Genus: Periploca
- Species: P. juniperi

Binomial name
- Periploca juniperi Hodges, 1978

Synonyms
- Periploca juniperae

Species of moth

Periploca juniperi is a moth in the family Cosmopterigidae. It was described by Ronald W. Hodges in 1978. It is found in North America, where it has been recorded from Wyoming and California.

Adults have been recorded on wing from June to August and in December.

The larvae feed within Gymnosporangium-galls on Juniperus species.
