= Burbank Unified School District =

School district in California, United States

Address
- 1900 W. Olive Avenue Burbank, California, 91506; United States
- Coordinates: 34°09′55″N 118°19′28″W

District information
- Grades: K through 12
- Established: 1908; 118 years ago
- President: Steve Ferguson
- Vice-president: Dr. Emily Weisberg
- Superintendent: Dr. Thomas McCoy
- NCES District ID: 0606450

Other information
- Website: burbankusd.org/

Burbank Unified School District is a school district headquartered in Burbank, California, United States.

== History ==
=== Founding; 1908 ===
Originally students attended Burbank schools until the high school level, when they moved on to Glendale Union High School District. The Burbank school district established its first high school, Burbank High School, in 1908, and therefore withdrew from the Glendale High School district.

=== 1950-1992 ===
The district passed a general obligation bond in the 1950s.

In 1992 the Brighton Community School, a school for students with disciplinary programs, moved to a site adjacent to the BUSD headquarters, on a 4-acre (1.6 ha) property. In 1998 BUSD sold the property to the city government for $8 million. The city planned to build a park and a library branch on this land. The district planned to move the Burbank school on the same site as Monterey High School, a school for students with academic problems, but by August 1998 the district withdrew these plans due to a negative response from area residents.

=== 1993-2000 ===
In March 1993 the district board voted 5–0 to approve random metal detector searches of middle and high school students.

In April 1994 the district failed to pass a $100-million bond. Superintendent Arthur Pierce resigned in May of that year. The district successfully passed a $112 million bond in 1997, the first-such bond passed since the 1950s.

=== 2010- 2019 ===
In August 2015 Matt Hill, previously a chief strategy officer at the Los Angeles Unified School District, became the district superintendent of BUSD.

In November 2015 the district approved board starting the following school year during the third week of August.

In April 2019, the district board voted unanimously to rename the David Starr Jordan Middle School due to David Starr Jordan's involvement with the eugenics movement. The middle school kept Jordan's name for the next two years while the school district searched for a replacement name that everyone could agree with. In March 2021, the district board finally decided to rename their middle school in honor of labor leader and civil rights activist Dolores Huerta.

=== 2020-present ===
On September 9, 2020, the school district removed Harper Lee's To Kill a Mockingbird, Mark Twain's Adventures of Huckleberry Finn, John Steinbeck's Of Mice and Men, Theodore Taylor's The Cay and Mildred D. Taylor's Roll of Thunder, Hear My Cry from middle school and high school whole class instruction after complaints were received from four parents of students. The decision gained the attention of anti-censorship organizations such as PEN America and the National Coalition Against Censorship who object the banning of these books from the classroom.

== Governing Board ==
Burbank Unified School District's Governing Board is composed of five members, elected to a four-year term. Elections were held at the same time as the Burbank City Council elections during the November General Election of even-numbered years.

In late 2022, a legal demand form letter was sent to the District, noting the Board of Education’s use of At-Large Elections for the Board of Education Members was in violation of the California Voting Rights Act (CVRA) and that the district would either need to pay a $30,000 settlement and transition to trustee area elections (districted elections) or see the individual in court. Understanding that most CVRA Court Cases were not successful fights for school districts the Board of Education agreed unanimously to transition to trustee areas for the 2024 election cycle.

== Schools ==
=== High schools ===
- Burbank High School
- John Burroughs High School
- Monterey High School (Continuation)

=== Middle schools ===
- John Muir Middle School
- Luther Burbank Middle School
- Dolores Huerta Middle School

=== Elementary schools ===
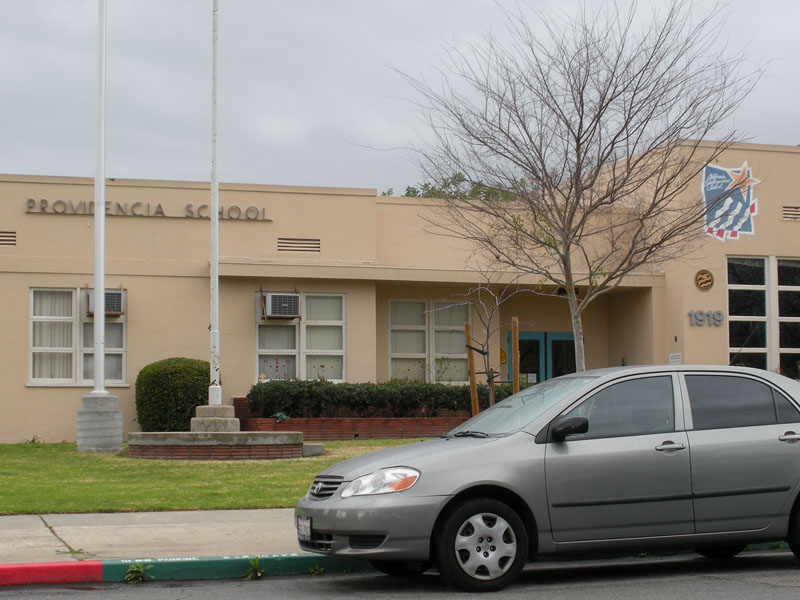
Providencia School

- Walt Disney Elementary School
- Thomas Edison Elementary School
- Ralph Emerson Elementary School
- Bret Harte Elementary School
- Thomas Jefferson Elementary School
- William McKinley Elementary School
- Joaquin Miller Elementary School
- Providencia Elementary School
- Theodore Roosevelt Elementary School
- R.L. Stevenson Elementary School
- George Washington Elementary School

=== Other schools ===
- Burbank Adult School
- Community Day School
- Magnolia Park School
- Horace Mann Children's Center

=== Former schools ===
- Abraham Lincoln Elementary School
- Henry M. Mingay Elementary School (Now Burbank Adult School)
- Monterey Elementary School (Now Monterey Continuation High School)
- Benjamin Franklin Elementary School
- Horace Mann Elementary School (Now Horace Mann Children's Center)
- John Quincy Adams Middle School (Now Thomas Edison Elementary School)
