= Periploca laeta =

Scientific classification
- Domain: Eukaryota
- Kingdom: Animalia
- Phylum: Arthropoda
- Class: Insecta
- Order: Lepidoptera
- Family: Cosmopterigidae
- Genus: Periploca
- Species: P. laeta

Binomial name
- Periploca laeta Hodges, 1962

Species of moth

Periploca laeta is a moth in the family Cosmopterigidae. It was described by Ronald W. Hodges in 1962. It is found in North America, where it has been recorded from Florida, Arizona, Illinois, Ohio, Quebec and West Virginia.

Adults have been recorded on wing in February and from May to July.

The larvae feed on Juniperus species.
