= Periploca palaearcticella =

Scientific classification
- Kingdom: Animalia
- Phylum: Arthropoda
- Clade: Pancrustacea
- Class: Insecta
- Order: Lepidoptera
- Family: Cosmopterigidae
- Genus: Periploca
- Species: P. palaearcticella

Binomial name
- Periploca palaearcticella Sinev, 1986

Species of moth

Periploca palaearcticella is a moth in the family Cosmopterigidae. It was described by Sinev in 1986. It is found in Russia.
