= Periploca mimula =

Scientific classification
- Domain: Eukaryota
- Kingdom: Animalia
- Phylum: Arthropoda
- Class: Insecta
- Order: Lepidoptera
- Family: Cosmopterigidae
- Genus: Periploca
- Species: P. mimula

Binomial name
- Periploca mimula Hodges, 1962

Species of moth

Periploca mimula is a moth in the family Cosmopterigidae. It was described by Ronald W. Hodges in 1962. It is found in North America, where it has been recorded from Arizona, Tennessee, Arkansas, Washington, Texas, and New Mexico.

Adults have been recorded on wing in July.

The larvae feed on the berries of Juniperus chinensis var. keteleeri.
