= Mike Woicik =

American football coach (born 1956)

Profile
- Positions: Strength and conditioning coach

Personal information
- Born: September 26, 1956 (age 70); Baltimore, Maryland, U.S.

Career information
- High school: Westwood (MA)
- College: Boston College

Career history
- Springfield (1978–1980) Weight room coordinator; Syracuse (1981–1989) Strength and conditioning coach; Dallas Cowboys (1990–1996) Strength and conditioning coach; New Orleans Saints (1997–1999) Strength and conditioning coach; New England Patriots (2000–2010) Strength and conditioning coach; Dallas Cowboys (2011–2020) Strength and conditioning coach

Awards and highlights
- 6× Super Bowl champion (XXVII, XXVIII, XXX, XXXVI, XXXVIII, XXXIX)

Mike Woicik (born September 26, 1956) is an American football strength and conditioning coach in the National Football League (NFL). He is tied for the record for third-most Super Bowl rings won (behind Bill Belichick and Tom Brady) with six, winning three with the Dallas Cowboys and three with the New England Patriots.

== Early life ==
Woicik graduated from Westwood High School in Westwood, Massachusetts before attending Boston College where he earned a bachelor's degree in history. He then went to Springfield College to receive his master's degree in physical education.

== Coaching career ==
=== College ===
Woicik began his coaching career as the track coach and weight room coordinator at Springfield from 1978 to 1980. He then was hired as a strength and conditioning coach by Syracuse University, where he stayed through 1989.

=== NFL ===
Woicik earned his first NFL coaching job in 1990 with the Cowboys as their strength and conditioning coach, replacing long-time strength coach Bob Ward. In his seven-year stint, the team won three Super Bowls (Super Bowl XXVII, Super Bowl XXVIII, and Super Bowl XXX). He then served the New Orleans Saints in the same capacity from the 1997 season through the 1999 season. In 2000, he was hired by the Patriots, where he won another three Super Bowls with the team (Super Bowl XXXVI, Super Bowl XXXVIII, and Super Bowl XXXIX).

On February 11, 2011, Woicik finalized a deal to rejoin the Cowboys as their strength conditioning coach. On January 13, 2020, Woicik was informed that he would not be retained for the 2020 season by new head coach Mike McCarthy.

== Awards and honors ==
- NFL Strength Coach of the Year – 1992
- Professional Football Strength and Conditioning Society's Coach of the Year Award – 1992
- Professional Football Strength and Conditioning Society's Coach of the Year Award – 2004

== Personal life ==
Woicik authored the book Total Conditioning for Football: The Syracuse Way (1985).
