= Periploca serrulata =

Scientific classification
- Domain: Eukaryota
- Kingdom: Animalia
- Phylum: Arthropoda
- Class: Insecta
- Order: Lepidoptera
- Family: Cosmopterigidae
- Genus: Periploca
- Species: P. serrulata

Binomial name
- Periploca serrulata Hodges, 1978

Species of moth

Periploca serrulata is a moth in the family Cosmopterigidae. It was described by Ronald W. Hodges in 1978. It is found in North America, where it has been recorded from Utah.
