= Burbank High School (Burbank, California) =

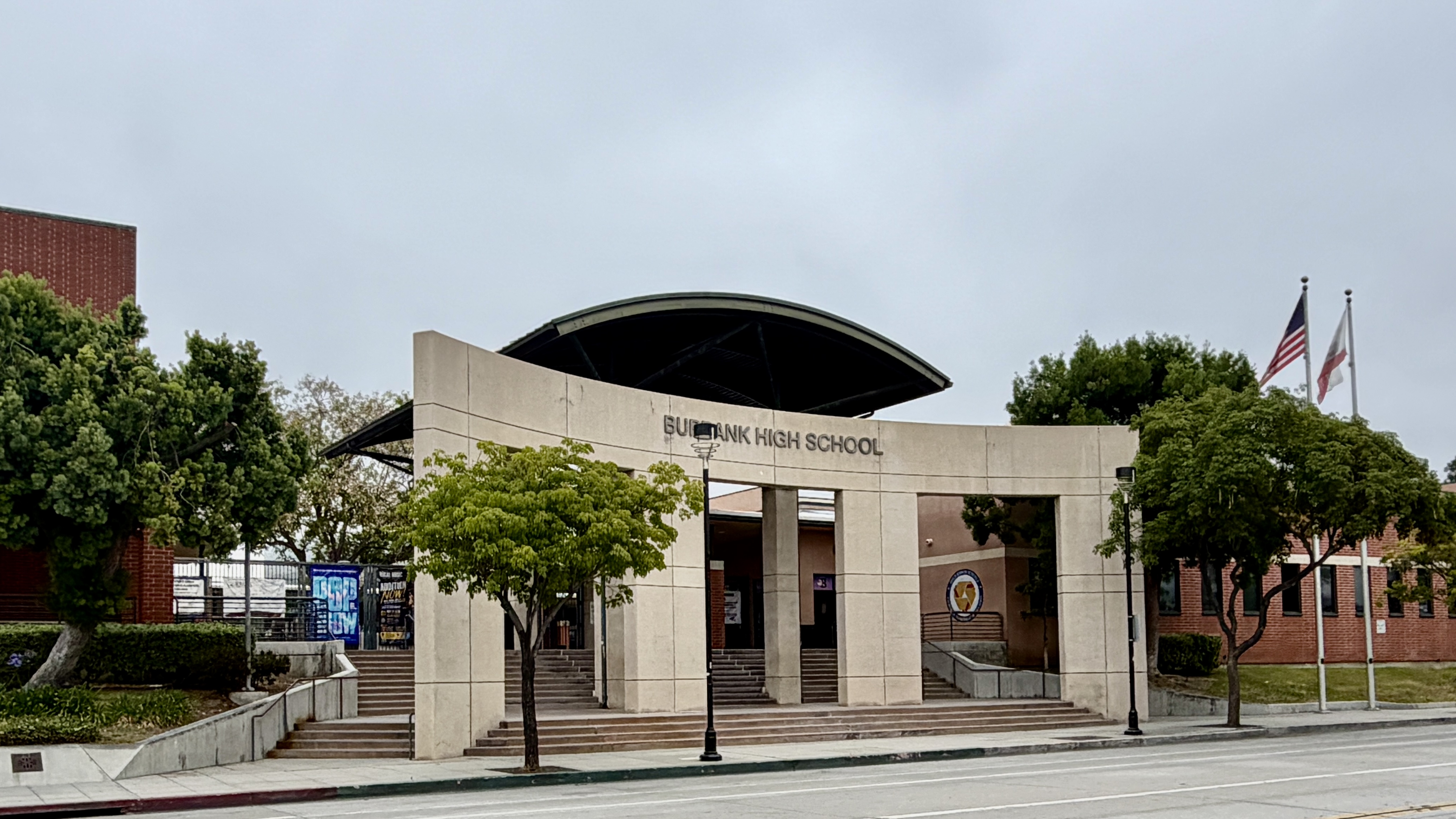

Location
- 902 N. Third Street; Burbank, California 91502; United States; 34.1880°N 118.31326°W

Information
- Type: Public
- Established: 1908
- School district: Burbank Unified School District
- NCES District ID
- NCES School ID: 060645000563
- Principal: Steven Hubbell
- Faculty: 98.72 (FTE)
- Enrollment: 2,471 (2023–2024)
- Student to teacher ratio: 25.03
- Colors: Royal Blue; White
- Athletics conference: CIF Southern Section Pacific League
- Team name: Bulldogs
- Newspaper: The Burbank Bulldog
- Yearbook: Ceralbus
- Website: Burbank High School

Burbank High School is a public high school in Burbank, California. It was established in 1908 and opened on September 14, 1914, with an inaugural class of 334 students. It is a part of the Burbank Unified School District. The area had previously been served by the Glendale Union High School District.

Burbank High began an extensive facility update in 2003, and its first phase of reconstruction was a building housing new classrooms for the entire school. By 2005, the campus also had a new gym, pool, visual and performing arts center, parking structure, athletic field, and tennis courts.

In addition to a core curriculum that satisfies the University of California A-G requirements, Burbank High offers 22 Honors and Advanced Placement classes, a wide variety of visual arts classes, career technical classes and nationally recognized performing arts.

== History ==
Burbank High was first established in 1908. Previously, students attended Burbank schools until the high school level, when they moved onto Glendale Union High School District. After 1908, the Burbank Unified School District withdrew from the Glendale Union High School District. The school is named after David Burbank, the founder and namesake of Burbank, California, not the American botanist Luther Burbank.

== Show Choir ==
Burbank High is known for its nationally ranked advanced mixed show choir called In Sync, directed by Brett Carroll. Also directed by Brett Carroll is the advanced women's group "Impressions." The Burbank High School show choir program was ranked number one in the country for 2009 and 2010. Burbank High School hosts its own non-competitive show choir competition called Burbank Blast, intended to be held annually starting 2008; starting in 2011, Burbank Blast became a full-fledged judged competition, the first Burbank High has ever hosted. Burbank High show choirs finished the 2010 competition season ranked in the top five overall in the nation. This marked the third straight year for this accomplishment.

== Journalism ==
The school newspaper is titled "The Burbank Bulldog."

The students and staff also publish a yearbook, the Ceralbus. "Ceralbus" means "blue and white." In 2010, Burbank High's 2009 yearbook reached the finalist round in the National Pacemaker Award for the first time.

== Speech and Debate ==
Burbank High School's most successful academic extracurricular program is its Speech and Debate team. In 2022 and 2023, Burbank High School's Speech and Debate coach, Brandon Batham, coached back-to-back national champions in World Schools Debate through the West Los Angeles Violet, a hybrid team of five students from five different schools in the Los Angeles area. The 2022 team included Burbank High School student Sungjoo Yoon, and the 2023 team included Burbank High School student Mihika Chechi, who became Burbank High School's first and second national champions, respectively. In doing so, Brandon Batham became the first coach to win two separate national championships in the format, and one of only a handful of coaches in the National Speech and Debate Association's history to win back-to-back national championships in the same event. In 2026, Burbank High School won its first state championship with Gwyneth Glover in Dramatic Interpretation at the California High School Speech Association's State Championship Tournament.

Burbank High School has been ranked one of the top 40 debate teams in the United States by the National Speech & Debate Association for the 2020-2021 school year; and the Harvard Debate Council's Best New School award in the Congressional Debate category. The program is notable for its success given it is one of the few national programs that do not rely on a school-provided curriculum or class, but rather alumni-based support. The program has the final rounds of the National Speech & Debate Tournament and the California High School Speech Association State Championship Tournament, the University of Kentucky's Tournament of Champions, and various other major tournaments several times, had members selected to the United States National Debate Team program, and more. Alumni have gone on to attend Harvard University, Columbia University, Cornell University, the London School of Economics, Carnegie-Mellon University, and many other prestigious colleges and universities.

== Athletics ==
Burbank High School ("The Bulldogs") fields a full range of high school interscholastic athletic teams including both men's and women's basketball teams, tennis, American football, cross country, baseball, softball, golf, track and field, swimming, water-polo, volleyball, soccer, and wrestling. Its football, soccer, and track and field teams practice and compete on Kemp-Kallem Field, named after former Burbank High teachers and coaches Dave Kemp and Frank Kallem. A dedication ceremony was held in 2019 with Kemp and Kallem present. It competes in the California Interscholastic Federation's Southern Section as a member of the Rio-Pacific Conference.

== Notable alumni ==
- Mackenzie Aladjem, actress and dancer
- Tajh Bellow, actor, General Hospital
- Kelly Blatz, actor
- Ralph Botting, baseball player
- Rob Bowman, director, The X-Files, Elektra
- Jack Burditt, TV writer
- Tim Burton, director, The Nightmare Before Christmas, Batman, Beetlejuice, Edward Scissorhands
- Dove Cameron, actress
- Paul Cameron, football player
- Mark Covert, class of 1968, distance runner
- Cathy Ferguson, Olympic swimmer, 2 gold medals at 1964 Tokyo Olympics
- Kim Fields, actress, The Facts of Life
- Jaimee Foxworth, actress
- Seychelle Gabriel, actress
- Don Grady, actor, musician, and film score composer
- Gary Grimes, actor, Summer of '42
- Blake Lively, actress, Gossip Girl, The Shallows
- Masiela Lusha, graduated at age 15, privately tutored on set of George Lopez
- Chris Marquette, actor
- Larry Maxam, Medal of Honor recipient for heroism during Vietnam War
- Jeff Nelson, held national high school record for two mile run 1979-2008
- Evan Peters, actor
- Debbie Reynolds, actress and singer, Singin' in the Rain, The Unsinkable Molly Brown, Mother
- Randy Rhoads, guitarist for Quiet Riot and Ozzy Osbourne
- Theresa Russell, actress, Black Widow, The Razor's Edge, The Last Tycoon
- Freddy Sanchez, baseball player
- Lon Simmons, sportscaster
- Frank Sullivan, baseball player
- Vic Tayback, actor, producer, Alice
- Matthew Timmons, actor
- Mitch Vogel, actor
- Bob Ward, strength and conditioning coach for the Dallas Cowboys. Fullerton College head track coach
- Paul Ward, football player. University of Kentucky head track coach
- Anson Williams, actor, producer, Happy Days
- Laura Ziskin, producer, Pretty Woman, Spider-Man

== In the media ==
The Nickelodeon TV show Victorious used digitally altered images of Burbank High School as a model of the front of Hollywood Arts, the fictional high school in which most of the series took place. The interior of the school, however, was filmed at Nickelodeon on Sunset. Additionally, the Disney Channel TV show A.N.T. Farm used the front of the school as transitions between scenes.

Corvette Summer was filmed at Burbank High School's auto shop building and classrooms.

In 1979, the Montreal Expos, along with other MLB stars, played basketball for charity in the Burbank High gymnasium. The radio DJ Charlie Tuna was the MC.
