= Periploca hostiata =

Scientific classification
- Domain: Eukaryota
- Kingdom: Animalia
- Phylum: Arthropoda
- Class: Insecta
- Order: Lepidoptera
- Family: Cosmopterigidae
- Genus: Periploca
- Species: P. hostiata

Binomial name
- Periploca hostiata Hodges, 1969

Species of moth

Periploca hostiata is a moth in the family Cosmopterigidae. It was described by Ronald W. Hodges in 1969. It is found in North America, where it has been recorded in Washington, California and Arizona.

== Description ==
The wingspan is about 8.3mm. The head, thorax and forewings are shining gray black. The hindwings are yellow white. Adults have been recorded on wing in July.
