= Periploca opinatrix =

Scientific classification
- Domain: Eukaryota
- Kingdom: Animalia
- Phylum: Arthropoda
- Class: Insecta
- Order: Lepidoptera
- Family: Cosmopterigidae
- Genus: Periploca
- Species: P. opinatrix

Binomial name
- Periploca opinatrix Hodges, 1969

Species of moth

Periploca opinatrix is a moth in the family Cosmopterigidae. It was described by Ronald W. Hodges in 1969. It is found in North America, where it has been recorded from Wyoming.

The wingspan is 9–10 mm. Adults have been recorded on wing in July.
