= Periploca dipapha =

Scientific classification
- Domain: Eukaryota
- Kingdom: Animalia
- Phylum: Arthropoda
- Class: Insecta
- Order: Lepidoptera
- Family: Cosmopterigidae
- Genus: Periploca
- Species: P. dipapha

Binomial name
- Periploca dipapha Hodges, 1969

Species of moth

Periploca dipapha is a moth in the family Cosmopterigidae. It was described by Ronald W. Hodges in 1969. It is found in North America, where it has been recorded from Arizona and Texas.

The wingspan is about 8.5 mm. The forewings and hindwings are shining yellow. Adults have been recorded on wing in July.
