= Periploca repanda =

Scientific classification
- Domain: Eukaryota
- Kingdom: Animalia
- Phylum: Arthropoda
- Class: Insecta
- Order: Lepidoptera
- Family: Cosmopterigidae
- Genus: Periploca
- Species: P. repanda

Binomial name
- Periploca repanda Hodges, 1978

Species of moth

Periploca repanda is a moth in the family Cosmopterigidae. It was described by Ronald W. Hodges in 1978. It is found in North America, where it has been recorded from Texas, Arizona and California.

The wingspan is about 13 mm. Adults have been recorded on wing in September.
