= Periploca nigra =

Scientific classification
- Domain: Eukaryota
- Kingdom: Animalia
- Phylum: Arthropoda
- Class: Insecta
- Order: Lepidoptera
- Family: Cosmopterigidae
- Genus: Periploca
- Species: P. nigra

Binomial name
- Periploca nigra Hodges, 1962

Species of moth

Periploca nigra, the juniper twig girdler, is a moth in the family Cosmopterigidae. It was described by Ronald W. Hodges in 1962. It is found in the United States, where it has been recorded from New York to Virginia and from Louisiana to California.
