= Paul Ward (American football) =

American football player (1937–2018)

No. 74, 73
- Positions: Defensive tackle, Guard

Personal information
- Born: January 30, 1937; Santa Fe, New Mexico
- Died: December 19, 2018 (aged 81)
- Listed height: 6 ft 3 in (1.91 m)
- Listed weight: 247 lb (112 kg)

Career information
- High school: Burbank (CA)
- College: Whitworth
- NFL draft: 1961: undrafted

Career history

Playing
- Detroit Lions (1961–1962)

Coaching
- Portland State University (1965–1969) Football assistant coach; University of Kentucky (1973–1974) Head track coach

Career NFL statistics
- Games played: 14
- Stats at Pro Football Reference

Paul Earl Ward (January 30, 1937 – December 19, 2018) was an American professional football defensive tackle in the National Football League for the Detroit Lions. He also was the University of Kentucky head track and field coach. He played college football at Whitworth College.

== Early life ==
Ward attended Burbank High School where he was all-league in football and track.

He accepted a football scholarship from Whitworth College, following his brother Bob footsteps. He also competed in track, in the events of Shot put and Discus throw. He graduated with a degree in Arts in 1958. He earned a physical education master's degree at the University of Washington in 1963.

== Professional career ==
Ward served in the United States Marine Corps from 1958 to 1961 and attained the rank of captain. While in the Marines, he played on their football teams. He then was signed as an undrafted free agent by the Detroit Lions after the 1961 NFL draft on October 18. He became the first Whitworth College graduate to play in the NFL. He was waived on September 4, 1962. He was later re-signed during the season. He was released on September 3, 1963.

== Personal life ==
His brother Bob, was the strength and conditioning coach for the Dallas Cowboys in the National Football League (NFL) and the Fullerton College head track and field coach.

He served in the United States Marine Corps from 1958 to 1961, attaining the rank of Captain. In 1966, he was mentioned in the book Paper Lion written by George Plimpton. He was part of the Portland State University football coaching staff from 1965 to 1969 and also coached the weight lifting team. In 1968, he was the Portland State University track head coach. In 1973, he received his Doctorate in Physical Education from Indiana University Bloomington. He was the head track coach at the University of Kentucky from 1973 to 1974.

He was the Director of Education, Research & Development for the Health and Tennis Corporation of America from 1974 to 1989. He served as an Exercise and Sports Performance Consultant for the Dallas Cowboys in the NFL in 1977.

Ward co-authored the book Encyclopedia of Weight Training: Weight Training for General Conditioning, Sport and Body Building (1997). He also published scientific articles (biomechanics & exercise science) in magazines like Muscle & Fitness.

In addition, he began competing in Masters athletics, winning multiple Masters Olympic lifting championships. Furthermore, he trained and coached elite and US Olympic track & field athletes, among them Lorna Griffin and Bonnie Dasse. He served in the US Olympic Committee as elite athlete coordinator for throws from 1982 to 1984.

Ward died of natural causes on December 19, 2018.
