= Periploca fessa =

Scientific classification
- Domain: Eukaryota
- Kingdom: Animalia
- Phylum: Arthropoda
- Class: Insecta
- Order: Lepidoptera
- Family: Cosmopterigidae
- Genus: Periploca
- Species: P. fessa

Binomial name
- Periploca fessa Hodges, 1962

Species of moth

Periploca fessa is a moth in the family Cosmopterigidae. It was described by Ronald W. Hodges in 1962. It is found in North America, where it has been recorded from Florida, Louisiana, Arkansas, Texas and Wyoming.
