= Periploca dentella =

Scientific classification
- Kingdom: Animalia
- Phylum: Arthropoda
- Clade: Pancrustacea
- Class: Insecta
- Order: Lepidoptera
- Family: Cosmopterigidae
- Genus: Periploca
- Species: P. dentella

Binomial name
- Periploca dentella Hodges, 1978

Species of moth

Periploca dentella is a moth in the family Cosmopterigidae. It was described by Ronald W. Hodges in 1978. It is found in North America, where it has been recorded from California.

Adults have been recorded on wing in May.

The larvae feed on Calocedrus decurrens.
