= Periploca ceanothiella =

Scientific classification
- Domain: Eukaryota
- Kingdom: Animalia
- Phylum: Arthropoda
- Class: Insecta
- Order: Lepidoptera
- Family: Cosmopterigidae
- Genus: Periploca
- Species: P. ceanothiella

Binomial name
- Periploca ceanothiella (Cosens, 1908)

Synonyms
- Cholotis ceanothiella Meyrick, 1915; Ascalenia ceanothiella; Stagmatophora ceanothiella Cosens, 1908

Species of moth

Periploca ceanothiella, the ceanothus stem gall moth, is a moth in the family Cosmopterigidae. It was described by Cosens in 1908. It is found in North America, where it has been recorded from Arizona, California, Florida, Kansas, Indiana, Louisiana, Mississippi, New York, Ontario, Oregon, South Carolina and Texas.

Wingspan 10 mm. The moth flies from March to August and in December.

The larvae feed on Ceanothus species. Young larvae bore into the stem of their host plant. The feeding causes stem galls. The species overwinters in the larval stage within the gall. Pupation takes place in summer.
