= Periploca hortatrix =

Scientific classification
- Domain: Eukaryota
- Kingdom: Animalia
- Phylum: Arthropoda
- Class: Insecta
- Order: Lepidoptera
- Family: Cosmopterigidae
- Genus: Periploca
- Species: P. hortatrix

Binomial name
- Periploca hortatrix Hodges, 1969

Species of moth

Periploca hortatrix is a moth in the family Cosmopterigidae. It was described by Ronald W. Hodges in 1969. It is found in North America, where it has been recorded from Arkansas, Illinois and Indiana.

The wingspan is about 9 mm for males and 6.5-7 for females. The head and forewings are shining gray black. The hindwings are pale yellowish white. Adults have been recorded on wing from May to July and in September.
