= Michèle Auger =

Canadian biophysicist

- Born: 1963; Grand-Mère
- Died: 29 October 2018
- Education: Université du Québec à Trois-Rivières, University of Ottawa
- Occupation: Biophysicist
- Awards: Fellow of the Chemical Institute of Canada
- Scientific career
- Workplaces: Université Laval (1991–)

Michèle Auger was a Canadian biophysicist and science communicator. She served as program director in Chemistry at Université Laval and served on the Council of the International Union of Pure and Applied Biophysics

== Early life and education ==
Auger was born in Grand-Mère and grew up in Trois-Rivières. She got her Bachelor in Chemistry at the Université du Québec à Trois-Rivières after transferring from biophysics. She went on to obtain a B. Sc. in 1985 and enrolled in biophysics at the University of Ottawa under C.P. Smith, where she specialized in the study of biological membranes using solid state nuclear magnetic resonance spectroscopy. After graduating in 1990, she joined the laboratory of Robert G. Griffin at the Massachusetts Institute of Technology.

== Career ==
Auger was hired as assistant professor at the Université Laval in 1991 and received a NSERC Women's Faculty Award. She was appointed as associated professor in 1996 and to full professorship in 2000.

She undertook a series of significant research projects related to membrane interactions with proteins, peptides and drugs. Her other research interests included biopolymers such as spider silk. Her research results were the object of some 125 peer-reviewed publications and 500 presentations at conferences.

Over the years, she served on Natural Sciences and Engineering Research Council of Canada grant committees and chaired the Chemistry Evaluation group. She held several positions at the Biophysical Society of Canada starting in 1994. The Society created the Michèle Auger Award for Exceptional Service in 2016. She served on the council of the International Union for Pure and Applied Biophysics between 2011 and 2017. She organized the 2017 International Society for Magnetic Resonance conference, held in Quebec City; her role in holding the conference was highlighted by the Cercle des ambassadeurs de Québec.

As a teacher, she received several faculty awards at the Université Laval. She mentored over one hundred undergraduates, graduate students and postdoctoral scholars. She served as program director in Chemistry for extended periods, establishing four new B.Sc. specializations, four international exchange programs, as well as an industrial internship. She created the Communication for Chemists course and created an activity aiming at promoting chemistry, Les 24 heures de la chimie.

As a science communicator, she held a activity called The Chemistry of odours at the Science Pavillon of Expo Québec in 2007 and regularly presented an interactive activity on that theme. She co-founded Action chimique in 2011, a series of school activities that ultimately reached 400,00o young people.

Auger died of cancer on 29 October 2018. She was married and had a daughter. In 2020, International Union of Pure and Applied Biophysics established the Michèle Auger Award for Young Scientists' Independent Research to honour her contributions to her field.

== Awards ==
- 2016 Michèle Auger Award for Exceptional Service (inaugural winner) - Biophysical Society of Canada
- 2012 Prix d'excellence en enseignement, catérogie Direction de programme - Université Laval
- 2007 Clara-Benson Award - Canadian Society for Chemistry
- 2002 Barringer Award - Spectroscopy Society of Canada

== Selected publications ==
- Bennett, Andrew E.; Rienstra, Chad M.; Auger, Michèle; Lakshmi, K. V.; Griffin, Robert J. (22 October 1995). "Heteronuclear decoupling in rotating solids". The Journal of Chemical Physics. 103 (16): 6951–6958. doi:10.1063/1.470372.
- Bernard, Geneviève; Auger, Michèle; Soucy, Jacques; Pouliot, Roxane (2007). "Physical characterization of the stratum corneum of an in vitro psoriatic skin model by ATR-FTIR and Raman spectroscopies". Biochimica et Biophysica Acta. 1770 (9): 1317–1323. doi:10.1016/j.bbagen.2007.06.014. PMID 17659842.
- Marcotte, Isabelle; Auger, Michèle (2005). "Bicelles as model membranes for solid-and solution-state NMR studies of membrane peptides and proteins". Concepts in Magnetic Resonance Part A: An Educational Journal. 24 (1): 17–37. doi:10.1002/cmr.a.20025.
