= Periploca gulosa =

Scientific classification
- Domain: Eukaryota
- Kingdom: Animalia
- Phylum: Arthropoda
- Class: Insecta
- Order: Lepidoptera
- Family: Cosmopterigidae
- Genus: Periploca
- Species: P. gulosa

Binomial name
- Periploca gulosa Hodges, 1962

Species of moth

Periploca gulosa is a moth in the family Cosmopterigidae. It was described by Ronald W. Hodges in 1962. It is found in North America, where it has been recorded from Arizona.
