= Periploca orichalcella =

Scientific classification
- Kingdom: Animalia
- Phylum: Arthropoda
- Clade: Pancrustacea
- Class: Insecta
- Order: Lepidoptera
- Family: Cosmopterigidae
- Genus: Periploca
- Species: P. orichalcella

Binomial name
- Periploca orichalcella (Clemens, 1864)

Synonyms
- Elachista orichalcella Clemens, 1864; Elachista concolorella Chambers, 1875; Periploca purpuriella Braun, 1919

Species of moth

Periploca orichalcella is a moth in the family Cosmopterigidae. It was described by James Brackenridge Clemens in 1864. It is found in North America, where it has been recorded from Virginia, Illinois and western Texas to California.
