= Periploca darwini =

Scientific classification
- Kingdom: Animalia
- Phylum: Arthropoda
- Clade: Pancrustacea
- Class: Insecta
- Order: Lepidoptera
- Family: Cosmopterigidae
- Genus: Periploca
- Species: P. darwini

Binomial name
- Periploca darwini Landry, 2001

Species of moth

Periploca darwini is a moth in the family Cosmopterigidae. It was described by Bernard Landry in 2001. It is found on the Galápagos Islands.
