= Periploca funebris =

Scientific classification
- Domain: Eukaryota
- Kingdom: Animalia
- Phylum: Arthropoda
- Class: Insecta
- Order: Lepidoptera
- Family: Cosmopterigidae
- Genus: Periploca
- Species: P. funebris

Binomial name
- Periploca funebris Hodges, 1962

Species of moth

Periploca funebris is a moth in the family Cosmopterigidae. It was first described by Ronald W. Hodges in 1962. It is found in North America, where it has been recorded in Arizona and California.

Adults have been recorded on wing in May.

The larvae feed on Juniperus monosperma.
