= Periploca devia =

Scientific classification
- Domain: Eukaryota
- Kingdom: Animalia
- Phylum: Arthropoda
- Class: Insecta
- Order: Lepidoptera
- Family: Cosmopterigidae
- Genus: Periploca
- Species: P. devia

Binomial name
- Periploca devia Hodges, 1969

Species of moth

Periploca devia is a moth in the family Cosmopterigidae. It was described by Ronald W. Hodges in 1969. It is found in North America, where it has been recorded from Arizona to California.

The wingspan is 8–10 mm. Adults have been recorded on wing in July.
