= Periploca gleditschiaeella =

Scientific classification
- Kingdom: Animalia
- Phylum: Arthropoda
- Clade: Pancrustacea
- Class: Insecta
- Order: Lepidoptera
- Family: Cosmopterigidae
- Genus: Periploca
- Species: P. gleditschiaeella

Binomial name
- Periploca gleditschiaeella (Chambers, 1876)

Synonyms
- Laverna gleditschiaeella Chambers, 1876; Anybia gleditschiaeella; Periploca gleditschiaeela

Species of moth

Periploca gleditschiaeella is a moth in the family Cosmopterigidae. It was described by Vactor Tousey Chambers in 1876. It is found in North America, where it has been recorded from Maryland, Illinois, Ohio and Kentucky.

The larvae feed on Gleditschia triacanthos.
