= CFOU-FM =

Radio station of the Université du Québec à Trois-Rivières in Canada

Coordinates: 46°20′54″N 72°34′38″W

- Trois-Rivières, Quebec; Canada
- Frequency: 89.1 MHz

Programming
- Format: campus radio

Ownership
- Owner: Université du Québec à Trois-Rivières; (Radio campus CFOU 89,1 FM)

History
- First air date: 1997
- Call sign meaning: C'est fou (it's crazy)

Technical information
- Class: A
- ERP: 3,000 watts
- HAAT: 43.1 metres (141 ft)

Links
- Website: cfou.ca

CFOU-FM (89.1 FM) is a French language radio station that broadcasts in Trois-Rivières, Quebec, Canada. It is the campus radio station of the Université du Québec à Trois-Rivières.

== History ==
CFOU-FM was licensed by the Canadian Radio-television and Telecommunications Commission in 1997, and originally operated with a transmitter power of 250 watts.

In 2006, the station received CRTC approval to increase its effective radiated power to 3,000 watts.
