= Blood: Water Mission =

US-based nonprofit organization

Blood:Water Mission is an international nonprofit that partners with African community-driven organizations to end health disparities caused by the HIV/AIDS and water crises. It is based in Nashville, Tennessee, US, and is led by Jake Smith.

Blood:Water Mission's core purpose is to build community through creative social action.

As of 2023, the organization is accredited by the ECFA, Charity Navigator and Give.org.

== History ==
Blood: Water Mission is a grassroots organization founded by musicians Jars of Clay and author Jena Lee Nardella. It began as a call to personalize the HIV/AIDS crisis in Africa by telling the stories of individual Africans.

The organization launched the 1000 Wells Project in 2005 as a nationwide effort to raise enough money to provide clean water and sanitation to 1000 communities in sub-Saharan Africa. This was based on the equation that $1 can provide one person in Africa with clean water for an entire year.

Since its launch, Blood:Water Mission has raised millions of dollars. They have partnered with over 800 communities in Africa, providing life-saving water and health needs for over 500,000 people in 13 different countries.

== Partnerships ==
The organisation has partnered with 33 groups across 12 countries, including Ethiopia, Sierra Leone, Sudan and Zambia

The Leader Collective programme was created to convene, cultivate, and amplify African leadership driving health, development and social change.

== 1000 Wells Project ==
Logo of the 1000 Wells Project

The 1000 Wells Project is Blood:Water Mission's main project. It originally had a goal of providing 1,000 communities in Africa with safe drinking water.

Jars of Clay and other artists (Sara Groves, Christopher Williams, Derek Webb, Forever the Sickest Kids, Sixpence None the Richer, Hanson (band), Brandon Heath, Matthew Perryman Jones, Relient K, and many others) as well as authors (Jena Lee Nardella, Donald Miller and Anne Jackson) have raised funds for the 1000 Wells Project during concerts and events since 2005. The organization completed their goal of 1,000 wells in late 2010.

With the September 2006 release of their album, Good Monsters, Jars of Clay partnered with The Global Water Challenge and the Coca Cola Company For each of the first 10,000 album copies sold, the companies would donate $1.00 toward the provision of clean water in Africa.

The 1000 Wells Project has expanded to include a variety of clean water solutions, sanitation and hygiene training. It also funds health clinics, community health workers and support groups, which help in the prevention, treatment, care, and support of communities affected by HIV/AIDS. One such example is a clinic in Lwala, Kenya, which is now independently operated and community-led.

== Other Campaigns ==
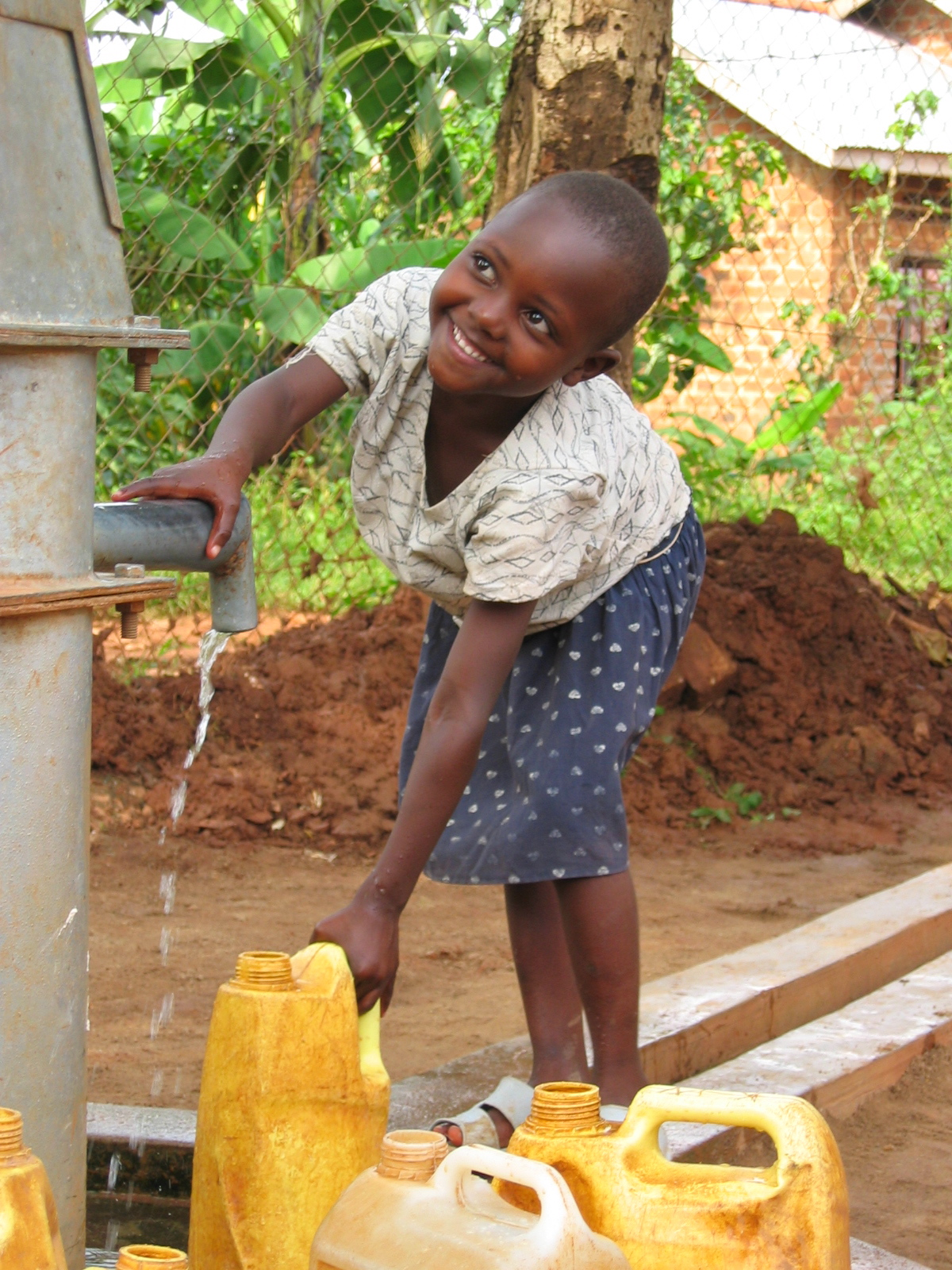
Ugandan girl at a well funded by Blood:Water Mission

=== Back to School ===
The "Back to School Campaign" encourages people to help provide the funds necessary to ensure that a child does not have to walk miles to collect water each day, but can instead spend that time in the classroom.

=== 40 Days of Water ===
Related to the Christian observance of Lent, volunteers raise money while refraining from drinking beverages other than water for 40 Days. Money raised helps build clean water projects for communities in Uganda. Another campaign, Two weeks of Sacrifice takes place over only 2 weeks versus 6.

=== Water Walks ===
A group of volunteers raise money for water and sanitation projects for underdeveloped regions in Africa, where young people must travel to natural water sources every day.

=== Ride Well Tour ===
The Ride:Well Tour was a cross-country cycling campaign to raise money and awareness for clean water and HIV/AIDS support in Africa. In two years, this raised almost $300,000 to provide clean water projects, clinics and educational opportunities for people in Africa while educating people in the US about the water and HIV/AIDS crises in Africa .

== Awards ==
Blood:Water was selected as one of ten Social Innovation Award Winners for 2021 by the Classy Awards Leadership Council.
