= Jena Lee Nardella =

American author and activist (born 1982)

- Born: January 31, 1982 (age 44)
- Education: Political Studies at Whitworth University
- Occupations: Co-Founder and Executive Director of Blood: Water
- Notable work: One Thousand Wells: How an Audacious Goal Taught Me To Love the World Instead of Save It

Jena Lee Nardella (born January 31, 1982) is an American author, writer, activist, co-founder and former executive director of Blood: Water, a nonprofit organization whose mission is to put an end to the HIV/AIDS and water crises in Africa. The organization has brought "clean blood and clean water to more than 62,000 Africans in 11 countries."

She also is the author of One Thousand Wells: How an Audacious Goal Taught Me To Love The World Instead of Save It.

== Biography ==
=== Family ===
Jena Lee Nardella was born in Woodland, California, on January 31, 1982, to Gus and Diane Lee. Her father is a first generation American from a family of Chinese immigrants whereas her mother is from the Midwest. Jena Nardella is the middle child of three, with a younger brother, and an older sister who died at 11 months of age due to a congenital heart defect.

Nardella grew up in the San Francisco Bay area in which she was exposed to diversity among race, gender, and most socioeconomic status. Jena Lee Nardella began her endeavors to helping others after an encounter with a homeless man on San Francisco's streets. This encounter resulted in her becoming a volunteer at a local homeless shelter.

=== Education ===
Nardella moved to Spokane, Washington to attend Whitworth University in fall of 2000 for four years where she originally majored in nursing. Throughout her time as an undergraduate student, she came to realize her focus should not be on nursing, but rather political studies in order to pursue the dreams she hoped to conquer.

With her major change, came her decision to attend educational lectures structured around her passion and major which paralleled her future. At one lecture in particular, she met the speaker named Dr. Steve Garber who later spoke with her on her future aspirations and gave her the chance to reach out and seek further support in making those dreams reality.

=== Career ===
Nardella found, through Dr. Garber, a Grammy Award-winning band whose values and dreams matched her own: Jars of Clay, a Christian rock band. While still in college, Nardella began to meet consistently with this band, especially Dan Haseltine, the band's lead singer. Through these visits and lots of brainstorming came the start of their co-founded non-profit, Blood: Water, and more importantly their main purpose, the project One Thousand Wells.

At age 22, Nardella moved to Nashville, Tennessee in order to continue pursuing the dream of growing and creating Blood: Water with Jars of Clay, who were all from this area. In 2004, she traveled to Kenya for her first Blood: Water-related trip. While in Kenya, she interacted with the people and communities who were suffering from a lack of clean water and health care. Afterwards, Nardella took multiple trips to Africa on behalf of the One Thousand Wells project, and she now splits her time between Nashville and East Africa.

She currently is a venture partner and nonprofit accelerator program lead for Praxis, a non-profit organization "that equips and resources a growing portfolio of entrepreneurs motivated by their faith to build organizations of considerable cultural and societal impact."

== One Thousand Wells ==
The book One Thousand Wells: How an Audacious Goal Taught Me To Love The World Instead of Save It was published in August, 2015. It is a memoir in which Nardella shares her wins and losses, feelings and story about her journey to achieve the goal of building one thousand wells that would provide a thousand communities in Africa with clean water. A part of the proceeds made from the sale of this book go to back to the Blood: Water cause.

== Accomplishments/Awards/Recognition ==
Nardella does public speaking appearances for colleges and universities such as her alma mater, Whitworth University, and Gonzaga University along with churches and conferences such as The Asbury Project and The Telemachus Annual Gathering. Her most noteworthy appearance was in 2012 when President Obama invited her to offer the closing benediction on national television at the National Democratic Convention for 20 million people.

Nardella has won multiple awards, including the Epoch Award, GOOD Magazine's GOOD 100, and named one of Christianity Today’s 33 Under 33 Christian leaders.

On top of writing her own novel, One Thousand Wells: How an Audacious Goal Taught Me to Love the World Instead of Save It, published in August 2012, she has contributed to many other relevant publications. Two of the books she has worked with other authors on are Hope in the Dark (with photojournalist Jeremy Cowart) and The Revolution: A Field Manual for Changing Your World. She has also appeared in films such as Sons of Lwala and Unconditional Love, which tells the story of Blood:Water's founding.
