= Leukemia & Lymphoma =

- Language: English
- Edited by: A. Polliack, K. Van Besien, J. Seymour

Publication details
- History: 1979-present
- Publisher: Informa
- Frequency: Monthly
- Impact factor: 2.891 (2014)

Standard abbreviations
- ISO 4: Leuk. Lymphoma

Indexing
- CODEN: LELYEA
- ISSN: 1042-8194 (print); 1029-2403 (web)
- OCLC no.: 19226345

Links
- Journal homepage; Online access; Online archive

Leukemia & Lymphoma is a peer-reviewed medical journal published by Informa Healthcare. It covers basic and clinical aspects of hematologic malignancies (leukemias and lymphomas). The editors-in-chief are Aaron Polliack (Hadassah University Hospital), Koen Van Besien (Weill Cornell Medical Center), and John Seymour (Peter MacCallum Cancer Centre).

== Abstracting and indexing ==
The journal is abstracted and indexed in:

- Science Citation Index Expanded
- Current Contents/Life Sciences
- Current Contents/Clinical Medicine
- EBSCO databases
- Index Medicus/MEDLINE/PubMed
- Excerpta Medica
- Current Awareness in Biological Sciences
- Chemical Abstracts Service

According to the Journal Citation Reports, the journal has a 2014 impact factor of 2.891.
