= Expert Review of Hematology =

- Discipline: Hematology
- Language: English

Publication details
- History: 2008-present
- Publisher: Taylor and Francis (Britain / United States)
- Frequency: Monthly

Standard abbreviations
- ISO 4: Expert Rev. Hematol.

Indexing
- ISSN: 1747-4086 (print); 1747-4094 (web)

Links
- Journal homepage; Online archive

Expert Review of Hematology is a MEDLINE-indexed, peer-reviewed, international medical journal publishing review articles and original papers on all aspects of hematology. It is part of the Expert Review series, published by Informa.

The journal provides commentary and analysis to elucidate best clinical practice in hematology and to translate advances in research – in areas such as immunology, stem cell research, and cell and gene therapy – into the clinical context. Each review includes an ‘expert commentary’ and a 'five-year view' section, in which authors are asked to provide their personal view on the current status and future direction of the research discussed.

The journal is aided by an international editorial advisory board of experts practicing within the field.

Expert Review of Hematology is currently in its 7th year of publication, has an Impact Factor of 2.07, and is available online or is published in paper format 12 times a year.

== Issue Contents ==
- Reviews
- Original Research Papers
- Perspectives
- Special Reports
- Drug Profiles
- Device Profiles
- Editorials
- Key Paper Evaluations
- Meeting Reports
- Clinical Trial Reports

== Key Areas of Coverage ==
- Acute leukemias
- Anemias
- Bleeding disorders
- Bone marrow and hematopoietic stem cell transplantation
- Cellular disorders
- Chronic leukemias
- Disorders of iron metabolism
- Hodgkins disease
- Infection in hematology
- Immunodeficiency syndromes
- Autoimmune diseases
- Marrow failure syndromes
- Multiple myeloma and amyloidosis
- Neutropenia
- Non-Hodgkin lymphomas
- Pediatric hematology
- Platelet disorders
- Thrombosis and hemostasis
- Transfusion medicine
