= Periploca cata =

Scientific classification
- Domain: Eukaryota
- Kingdom: Animalia
- Phylum: Arthropoda
- Class: Insecta
- Order: Lepidoptera
- Family: Cosmopterigidae
- Genus: Periploca
- Species: P. cata

Binomial name
- Periploca cata Hodges, 1962

Species of moth

Periploca cata is a moth in the family Cosmopterigidae. It was described by Ronald W. Hodges in 1962. It is found in North America, where it has been recorded from Illinois and Arkansas.

Adults have been recorded on wing from May to August.

The larvae feed in Gymnosporangium-galls on Juniperus species.
