= Atep =

Atep or ATEP may refer to:

- Advanced Technology & Education Park, a part of the California Community Colleges system
- Atep, a fictional Egyptian magician in Ace of Wands series 3
- Atep Rizal (born 1985), Indonesian footballer

== See also ==
- Atepa, a genus of moths
