= Athletic trainer =

Licensed provider in sports medicine

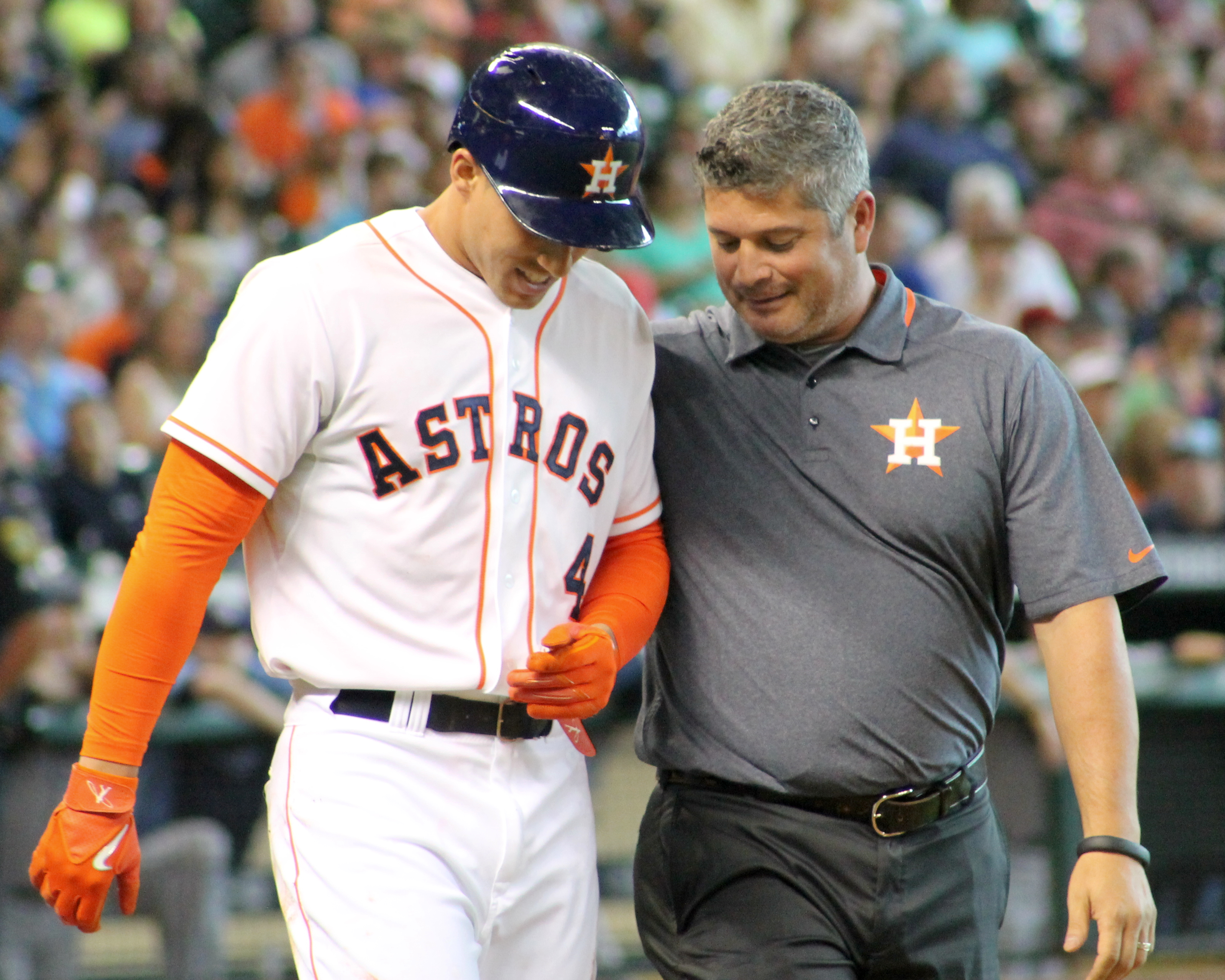
Athletic trainer Nate Lucero (right) evaluates Houston Astros baseball player George Springer after Springer was hit by a pitch in 2014

An athletic trainer is a certified and licensed health care provider who practices in the field of sports medicine. Athletic training has been recognized by the American Medical Association (AMA) as an allied health care profession since 1990.Athletic trainers provide health care of physically active and sedentary patients and work in traditional athletic settings a well as hospitals, physician practices, occupational health, the military and performing arts.

As defined by the Strategic Implementation Team of the National Athletic Trainers' Association (NATA) in August 2007:

"Athletic training is practiced by athletic trainers, health care providers who collaborate with physicians to optimize activity and quality of life for patients both of the physically active and sedentary population. Athletic training encompasses the prevention, diagnosis and intervention of emergency, acute and chronic medical conditions involving impairment, functional limitations and disabilities."

"Athletic training encompasses the prevention, examination, diagnosis, treatment, and rehabilitation of emergent, acute or chronic injuries and medical conditions. Athletic training is recognized by the American Medical Association (AMA), Health Resources Services Administration (HRSA) and the Department of Health and Human Services (HHS) as an allied health care profession."

Athletic trainers may provide care throughout an injury or illness, including prevention, examination, immediate care, therapeutic intervention, rehabilitation, and return to activity. Their role can also include health education, injury-prevention programs, and emergency preparedness.

To become an athletic trainer, one must have a master's degree from an accredited professional level education program and then sit for and pass the Board of Certification (BOC) examination. Since 2023, all accredited professional programs have been required to provide a master's level education. The change to master's-level professional education did not require athletic trainers who were already credentialed to obtain an additional degree. Each state then has its own regulatory agencies that control the practice of athletic training in their state. Most states (43) require an athletic trainer to obtain a license in order to practice in that state, 4 states (Hawaii, Minnesota, Oregon, West Virginia) require registration, 2 states (New York, South Carolina) require certification, while California has no state regulations on the practice of athletic training. Areas of expertise of certified athletic trainers include:

- Apply protective or injury-preventive devices such as tape, bandages, and braces
- Recognize and evaluate injuries
- Provide first aid or emergency care
- Develop and carry out rehabilitation programs for injured athletes
- Plan and implement comprehensive programs to prevent injury and illness among athletes
- Perform administrative tasks such as keeping records and writing reports on injuries and treatment programs
- Recognize potentially life-threatening conditions and provide or coordinate immediate care
- Evaluate functional limitations and determine when referral to another health care provider is appropriate
- Develop and progress therapeutic interventions intended to restore function and support return to activity

Contemporary athletic training practice is organized by the Board of Certification into five domains: risk reduction, wellness and health literacy; assessment, evaluation and diagnosis; critical incident management; therapeutic intervention; and health care administration and professional responsibility.

Services rendered by the athletic trainer take place in a wide variety of settings and venues, including actual athletic training facilities, primary schools, universities, inpatient and outpatient physical rehabilitation clinics, hospitals, physician offices, community centers, workplaces, and even the military. Emerging settings for athletic training include surgical fellowship opportunities.Athletic trainers also practice in occupational and industrial health, public safety, performing arts, and other settings outside organized sport.

== Educational programs ==
The Commission on Accreditation of Athletic Training Education (CAATE) oversees the curriculum standards of all accredited Professional (entry level) and all the institutions. The standards dictate the content of both didactic and clinical practice portions of the educational program. Professional education combines classroom and laboratory instruction with supervised clinical education in which students apply knowledge and skills to patient care. Content areas include:

- Risk Management and Injury Prevention
- Pathology of Injuries and Illnesses
- Orthopedic Clinical Examination and Assessment
- Medical Conditions and Disabilities
- Acute Care of Injuries and Illnesses
- Therapeutic Modalities
- Conditioning and Rehabilitative Exercises
- Psychosocial Intervention and Referral
- Nutritional Aspects of Injuries and Illnesses
- Healthcare Administration
- Professional Development and Responsibility
- Healthcare Professional Development and Responsibility

Clinical education exposes students to different patient populations, health conditions, and practice settings where they can develop skills in examination, emergency care, rehabilitation, prevention, and health care administration.

The professional master's degree is an entry level degree for initial preparation as an athletic trainer and is distinct from post-professional education for individuals who are already credentialed.

== Post-professional programs ==
There are several post-professional masters-level athletic training programs. These programs are for credentialed athletic trainers who desire to become scholars, researchers, and advanced practice professionals. Post-professional programs may emphasize advanced clinical practice, research, education, leadership, or health care administration.

Schools with post-professional athletic training masters programs include: A.T. Still University, University of Hawaii at Manoa, Illinois State University, Indiana State University, Indiana University, University of Kentucky, Michigan State University, Western Michigan University, University of North Carolina Chapel Hill, Ohio University, University of Oregon, California University of Pennsylvania, Thomas Jefferson University, Temple University, Old Dominion University, University of Toledo, University of Virginia, University of Missouri, Weber State University, University of Michigan, University of North Georgia and Winona State University.

There are doctoral programs in athletic training, each with different curricular emphasis. Athletic training program in doctoral education is offered by the University of Idaho, Florida International University, A.T. Still University, Indiana State University, Ohio University, Temple University, and Moravian University.

The Doctor of Athletic Training (DAT) is generally a post-professional clinical doctorate for credentialed athletic trainers. Athletic trainers pursuing research-intensive academic careers may instead complete research doctorates such as a PhD.

== Patient populations and practice settings ==
Athletic trainers treat a broad population, from the amateur and professional athlete to the typical patient in need of orthopedic rehabilitative care. Despite the occupational title, patients receiving athletic training services do not have to be competitive athletes. The NATA describes typical clients groups as:

- Recreational, amateur and professional athletes
- Individuals who have sustained musculoskeletal injuries
- Those seeking strength, conditioning, fitness and performance enhancement
- Others designated by the physician.

Depending on the setting and the applicable state law, athletic trainers may evaluate and manage muskuloskeletal injuries, concussions, and other head injuries, environmental illnesses, exertional conditions, and acute medical emergencies, and may refer patients to physicians or other health care professionals when needed.

In organized sports, athletic trainers commonly provide care during practices and competitions. Their responsibilities may include injury prevention, on-site evaluation, emergency response, rehabilitation, documentation, communication with other health care providers, and management of progression toward return to participation.

Services rendered by the athletic trainer take place in a wide variety of settings and venues. These may include:

- Athletic training clinics
- Schools (K-12, colleges, universities)
- Outpatient Rehabilitation Clinics
- Hospitals
- Physician offices
- Community facilities
- Workplaces (commercial and government)
- Military installations and veteran medical facilities
- Professional sport organizations
- Performing arts
- Industrial and occupational health settings
- Public safety organizations

== Emergency care ==
Emergency care is a component of athletic training practice, particularly in settings involving physical activity. Athletic trainers may be among the first health care professionals to evaluate an injury or medical emergency occurring during a practice, competition, workplace activity, or other event.

Preparation can include development and rehearsal of emergency action plans, recognition of life-threatening conditions, activation of emergency medical services, and immediate care within the athletic trainer's scope of practice. Conditions encountered may include sudden cardiac arrest, exertional heat illness, severe bleeding, cervical spine injuries, and respiratory emergencies.

Professional certification also requires continuing emergency cardiac care qualifications.

== Injury prevention and rehabilitation ==
Injury and illness prevention may include identifying risk factors, monitoring environmental conditions, fitting protective equipment, applying taping or bracing techniques, educating patients, and developing conditioning or injury-prevention programs.

Following injury, athletic trainers may develop and supervise rehabilitation programs intended to restore mobility, strength, neuromuscular control, endurance, and functional ability. Rehabilitation can progress from early management through sport-, occupation-, or activity-specific tasks.

Athletic trainers frequently collaborate with physicians, physical therapists, strength and conditioning professionals, and other health care providers. Return-to-activity decisions may incorporate symptoms, physical examination findings, functional testing, the demands of the patient's activity, and restrictions established by other members of the health care team.

== See also ==
- National Athletic Trainers' Association
- Board of Certification, Inc.
- Athletic training
- Sports medicine
- Sports Injury
- Emergency action plan
- concussion in sport
