= Université du Québec à Trois-Rivières =

University in Québec, Canada

Coordinates: 46°21′2.04″N 72°34′34.67″W

University of Quebec in Trois-Rivières
- Université du Québec à Trois-Rivières
- Type: Public
- Established: March 19, 1969
- Affiliations: UACC; CIS, QSSF, CBIE
- Rector: Christian Blanchette
- Administrative staff: 1,781 employees
- Students: 14,740
- Undergraduates: 11,210
- Postgraduates: 3,530
- Location: 3351, boulevard des Forges; Trois-Rivières, Quebec, Canada; G9A 5H7
- Campus: Trois-Rivières, Victoriaville, Drummondville, Saint-Hyacinthe, Quebec City, Sorel-Tracy, Joliette & Centre Universitaire des Appalaches
- Sports teams: UQTR Patriotes
Colours
Green, Gold and Black
- Website: uqtr.ca

The Université du Québec à Trois-Rivières (French pronunciation: [ynivɛʁsite dy kebɛk a tʁwa ʁivjɛʁ], University of Quebec in Trois-Rivières, UQTR), also known as "l'université du peuple", established in 1969 and mainly located in Trois-Rivières, Quebec, Canada, is a public university within the Université du Québec network. As of April 2016, the university had 14,500 students in 9 different campuses, including the main one in Trois-Rivières. About 788 of them come from overseas, from 50 countries. The university has given more than 88,000 diplomas since its founding. The Trois-Rivières campus also holds a large library with about 400,000 documents.

== History ==
UQTR was created in 1969 with the merger of the "Centre d'Études universitaires de Trois-Rivières" and "L'école normale d'État Maurice Duplessis" (named after Maurice Duplessis). The first major campus, Ringuet, was opened in 1973 and is located in the vicinity of Des Forges and Des Récollets boulevards near downtown Trois-Rivières. Over the following years, UQTR has expanded outside of the city into several towns in the Centre-du-Québec, Montérégie, Lanaudière, Quebec and Chaudière-Appalaches regions. Over the 1973-2009 time period the university has enjoyed a period of long term growth punctuated by several periods of short term fluctuation.

=== 2005 student protests ===
During the 2005 student protests, students narrowly voted in early March for a three-day student strike whose period included March 16, when several hundred UQTR students participated in a general protest in Montreal. Two days later, the students narrowly voted for a return to class. However, due to complaints made by some student groups, the students and some instructors boycotted again about a week later. During the first boycott, some instructors reported to work to teach classes as scheduled. Groups called "commandos" patrolled the Trois-Rivières area in search of these instructors who failed to honour the pickets, enticing them to stay away from UQTR during the boycott.

== Programs ==
University rankings

World rankings
- USNWR World: 1603

Canadian rankings
- USNWR National: 36

=== Medicine ===
Since 2004, the University of Montreal Faculty of Medicine has operated a satellite campus of its medical school at UQTR. The preclinical years are simulcast with the respective classes in Montreal, and the two clinical years are completed in the Centre hospitalier régional de Trois-Rivières (CHRTR) and the Centre hospitalier du centre de la Mauricie (CHCM). The degree is granted by the University of Montreal.

In 2007, the construction of a new medical education pavilion began, which was completed in 2010.

=== Podiatry ===
In fall of 2004, UQTR launched the first podiatry program in Canada. Upon obtaining all 195 university credits, students are awarded with a Doctor of Podiatric Medicine degree; thus, this makes UQTR the first French-language university in the world to offer the DPM degree. The foundation of this program was based on the American definition of podiatric medicine and was developed in association with the New York College of Podiatric Medicine. The program enrols 25 students per year.

=== Chiropractic ===
UQTR is home to the first public and the first university-based chiropractic school in North America. The program is limited to 47 admissions per year.

=== Athletic therapy ===
UQTR is home to the first French-speaking graduate athletic therapy program in North America. This applied Master program is limited to 25 admissions per year. The program is accredited by the Canadian Athletic Therapists Association since 2017.

=== Midwifery ===
UQTR is the only university in Quebec offering a midwifery program. It welcomes up to 24 students per year since its implementation in 1999.

=== Engineering ===
Students can choose to specialize in the following disciplines: chemical engineering, electrical engineering, industrial engineering, and mechanical engineering.

== Hydrogen ==
UQTR hosts the Institute for Hydrogen Research (IHR), established in 1994. The mission of IHR is to advance energy transition through innovation in advanced materials, engineering, and safety. The vision of the IHR is fundamentally multidisciplinary: the research areas encompasses basic Sciences, Engineering, and Social Sciences. The object is to promote the energy transition and train a skilled and versatile workforce capable of innovating in Energy and Materials.

== Sports ==
The university is represented in U Sports by the UQTR Patriotes which has teams in swimming, golf, hockey, soccer, cheerleading, badminton, athleticism, volleyball and flag football

== Notable people ==
=== Faculty ===
- Georges Larivière
- Bruno Georges Pollet

=== Alumni ===
- Robert Aubin
- Pierre-Michel Auger
- Xavier Barsalou-Duval
- Lysane Blanchette-Lamothe
- Gilles Bouchard
- Marc-Yvan Côté
- Jean Damphousse
- Angèle Delaunois
- Sam Hamad
- Donald Martel
- Michel Matte
- Macsuzy Mondon
- Roger Paquin
- Jean-Guy Paré
- Fred Pellerin
- Pierre Pettigrew
- Louis Plamondon
- Hery Rajaonarimampianina
- Jean Rioux
- Michel Seymour
- Judy Streatch
- Luc Tardif
- Rémy Trudel
- Robert J. Vallerand
- Andrée Watters

== See also ==
- Canadian government scientific research organizations
- Canadian industrial research and development organizations
- Canadian Interuniversity Sport
- Canadian university scientific research organizations
- CFOU Radio
- Higher education in Quebec
- List of universities in Quebec
