= National Athletic Trainers' Association =

Professional membership association

- Formation: 1950
- Type: Professional association
- Headquarters: Carrollton, Texas
- Location: United States
- Members: 35,000
- Official language: English
- President: A.J. Duffy III
- Board of directors: Donna Wesley Vice President/District Nine Director Scott Galloway, MBA, LAT, ATC Secretary/Treasurer/District Six Director Vicky Graham, DAT, LAT, ATC District One Director Christina Emrich, MS, LAT, ATC District Two Director Ray Davis Jr., MSS, LAT, ATC District Three Director Scott Lawrance, DHSc, ATC, PT District Four Director Rusty McKune, MS, LAT, ATC, District Five Director Valerie Herzog, EdD, LAT, ATC District Seven Director Cindy Clivio, MEd, ATC District Eight Director Donna Wesley, MS, LAT, ATC District Nine Director Kasee Hildenbrand, PhD, LAT, ATC District Ten Director Ryan Wilkinson, EdD, LAT, ATC District Eleven Director
- Website: http://www.nata.org/

The National Athletic Trainers' Association (NATA) is the professional membership association for certified athletic trainers and others who support the athletic training profession. Founded in 1950, the NATA currently has 35,000 members worldwide.

== History ==
The NATA was founded in 1950 when the first meeting of the NATA took place in Kansas City, Missouri. Recognizing the need for a set of professional standards and appropriate professional recognition, the NATA tried to unify certified athletic trainers across the country by setting a standard for professionalism, education, certification, research, and practice settings. Earlier, it was headquartered in Greenville, North Carolina, but now, the NATA is headquartered in Dallas, Texas.

In 2016 at their national convention in Baltimore, the National Athletic Trainers' Association announced the launch of its first-ever public awareness campaign, At Your Own Risk. The campaign is designed to educate, provide resources and equip the public (non-athletic trainers) to act and advocate for safety in work, life, and sport.

== Code of Ethics ==
The National Athletic Trainers’ Association Code of Ethics states the principles of ethical behavior that should be followed in the practice of athletic training. It is intended to establish and maintain professionalism for the athletic training profession.

== Districts ==
The NATA consists of 11 Districts. For purposes of the election of NATA’s President and Board of Directors, and subject to the provisions of Section 5.2 of the NATA Bylaws, NATA shall be divided into ten Districts. Each voting Member of NATA may only be a Member of one District.

=== Eastern (District 1) ===
- Connecticut, Massachusetts, Rhode Island, Vermont, New Hampshire, and Maine

=== Eastern (District 2) ===
- Delaware, New Jersey, New York, and Pennsylvania

=== Mid-Atlantic (District 3) ===
- Maryland, North Carolina, South Carolina, Virginia, West Virginia, and District of Columbia

=== Great Lakes (District 4) ===
- Indiana, Michigan, Ohio

=== Mid America (District 5) ===
- Iowa, Kansas, Missouri, Nebraska, North Dakota, Oklahoma, and South Dakota

=== Southwest (District 6) ===
- Arkansas and Texas

=== Rocky Mountain (District 7) ===
- Arizona, Colorado, New Mexico, Utah, and Wyoming

=== Far West (District 8) ===
- California, Hawaii, and Nevada

=== Southeast (District 9) ===
- Alabama, Florida, Georgia, Kentucky, Louisiana, Mississippi, and Tennessee

=== Northwest (District 10) ===
- Alaska, Idaho, Montana, Oregon, Washington, Alberta, British Columbia, and Saskatchewan

=== Great Lakes (District 11) ===
- Illinois, Minnesota, Wisconsin

== Awards ==
Each year during the NATA Annual Meeting and Clinical Symposia awards are presented for research and outstanding achievement in sports medicine.
