= Athletic training =

Healthcare profession

Occupation
- Synonyms: Athletic therapy
- Occupation type: Profession
- Activity sectors: Health care

Description
- Competencies: Sports medicine, Primary care, Emergency service, Exercise prescription
- Education required: Master of Science Bachelor of Science
- Fields of employment: Sport, Clinic, Performing arts, Occupational medicine, Public security
- Related jobs: Sports medicine physician, Physiatrist, Physician assistant, Physical therapist, Emergency medical technician

Athletic training is an allied health care profession recognized by the American Medical Association (AMA) that "encompasses the prevention, examination, diagnosis, treatment, and rehabilitation of emergent, acute, or chronic injuries and medical conditions." There are five areas of athletic training listed in the seventh edition (2015) of the Athletic Training Practice Analysis: injury and illness prevention and wellness promotion; examination, assessment, diagnosis; immediate and emergency care; therapeutic intervention; and healthcare administration and professional responsibility.

Athletic trainers (ATs) generally work in places like health clinics, secondary schools, colleges and universities, professional sports programs, and other athletic health care settings, usually operating "under the direction of, or in collaboration with a physician."

== Overview ==
According to the National Athletic Trainers' Association, there are more than 58,000 athletic trainers around the world. The U.S. Bureau of Labor Statistics projects that employment of the athletic trainers is estimated to grow by 19% between 2018 and 2028.

== Working environments ==
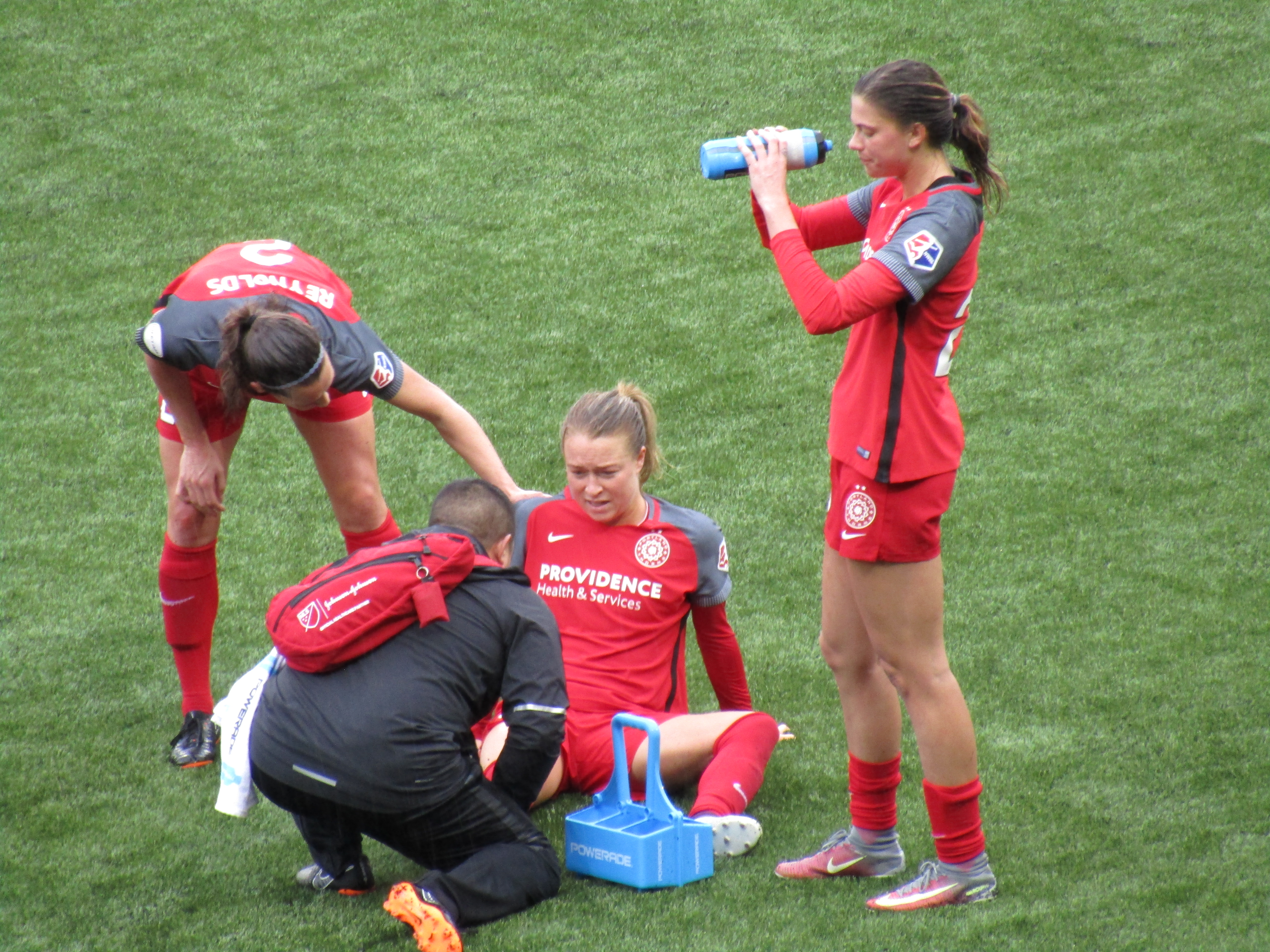
Athletic trainer attending to a Portland Thorns player

The traditional setting for athletic trainers is embedded within a sports team. In the United States, over 40% of athletic trainers work at an educational institution, including universities, secondary schools, and middle schools, providing health care to student athletes. Athletic trainers in this setting are commonly present at practices and competitions to be able to serve as first responders and deliver care as needed. Providing care at practices and competitions commonly leads to long working hours, including nights and weekends.

Also, in the United States, approximately 18% of athletic trainers work in a clinic setting. This includes sports medicine clinics, outpatient ambulatory rehabilitation clinics, emergency departments, physician clinics, and assisting in surgery, among others. Job duties and responsibilities vary in this setting.

In recent decades, athletic trainers have been expanding into additional settings such as the performing arts, occupational medicine, and public security.

== Mental health and burnout ==
Around 72% of collegiate athletic trainers report moderate levels of burnout, driven by long working hours, high workloads, and the emotional weight of patient care.

Athletic trainers frequently work 10 to 14- hour days, including early mornings, late nights, weekends, and year-round travel. Researchers suggest that long working hours, high workloads, limited time for personal activities, and the pressure to provide quality care can contribute to increased stress and emotional exhaustion.

Chronic time pressures make it difficult to balance personal lives, rest and family responsibilities. Athletic trainers manage the intense emotions, pain, and injuries of athletes while absorbing the pressures of coaches, parents, and administration. Inadequate staffing, low salaries, and navigating athletic departments politics contribute heavily to role strain and high attrition (especially for professionals under 30 or leaving the field).

Emotional exhaustion is the core pillar of burnout and it is closely tied to high rates of self- reported anxiety and depression among healthcare and support staff. Chronic stress leads to fatigue, sleep disturbances, diminished performance, and a higher risk of clinical or medical errors. Unmanaged stress drives many qualified athletic trainers to leave the profession or switch career settings entirely.

== Roles and responsibilities ==
=== Scope ===
Athletic trainers work under the direction of a physician to deliver sports medicine services. They are commonly primary care providers for the populations that they serve, managing their day-to-day health care and care coordination needs. As sports medicine professionals, athletic trainers are broadly concerned with the prevention and treatment of sports injuries.

Athletic trainers receive formal training in topics such as:

- Stages:
  - Risk management
  - Health assessment
  - Medical diagnosis
  - Acute care
- Areas:
  - Injury prevention
  - Concussions in sport
  - Pathology of injuries and illnesses
  - Human musculoskeletal system (orthopedics)
  - Human anatomy
  - Exercise physiology
  - Sports biomechanics
  - Therapeutic modalities (e.g. ultrasound, electrotherapy)
  - Physical medicine and rehabilitation
  - Psychosocial intervention
  - Pharmacology
  - Nutrition
- Overarching:
  - Professional responsibility
  - Medical ethics
  - Evidence-based medicine
  - Health administration

=== Referring ===
In certain instances, patients and clients may require treatment or consultation that falls beyond the scope of an athletic trainer's expertise. In such cases, the athletic trainer's responsibility is to make appropriate referrals to other healthcare professionals. Various supporting health services may be utilized, including school health services, nurses, physicians, dentists, podiatrists, physician assistants, physical therapists, strength and conditioning specialists, biomechanists, exercise physiologists, nutritionists, psychologists, massage therapists, occupational therapists, emergency medical technicians, paramedics, chiropractors, orthopedists, prosthesis experts, equipment personnel, referees, or social workers.

=== NATA code of ethics ===
"The National Athletic Trainers' Association Code of Ethics states the principles of ethical behavior that should be followed in the practice of athletic training. It is intended to establish and maintain high standards and professionalism for the athletic training profession."

== Education ==
=== Undergraduate general studies ===
The content of the courses will vary based upon the institute and professor, but there are some general subject matters that any AT is required to study including human and exercise physiology, kinesiology, anatomy, and nutrition. These subjects are commonly studied to increase knowledge regarding athletic training.

Physiology "is the scientific study of functions and mechanisms in a living system". More in-depth studies of physiology is between human and exercise physiology. Human Physiology is more anatomical structures, exercise physiology is physical exercise conditions and treatments. Kinesiology "identifies stress in our muscles and uses relaxation techniques to release tension and improve our mood, health, and overall well-being" Used in athletic training, focuses more on muscle anatomy and sport focused rehabilitation. Human anatomy studies the structures on the body including muscular systems, organs, respiratory, bone anatomy, veins, and arteries. This also includes physical examinations of the extremities. Which will include injury recognition, treatment, taping, bracing, and care. After the examination an AT might have to perform acute care of injury. This is implemented when dealing with trauma and illnesses sustained during sport participation. This includes field evaluation of medical emergencies, such as cessation of breathing or circulation, shock, concussion, and spinal injury. After performing care, somewhere down the road athletic trainers may have to provide rehabilitation strategies to go through with the athlete. ATs need to know about basic nutritional principles and concepts that lead to an athlete's personal health, relationship with food and overall optimal health. How a student eats is influential on their recovery time and overall athletic performance.

=== Accreditation ===
The Commission on Accreditation of Athletic Training Education (CAATE), under the Council for Higher Education Accreditation, is the accrediting body for athletic training education programs in the United States. Only individuals who successfully complete an accredited program are eligible to sit for the certification exam to become an athletic trainer. CAATE lists all the accredited programs in the United States on their website. It provides the college's name, contact information, and a link to the institution's website.

=== Entry-level master's programs ===
An entry-level master's degree is a two-year program that covers the material required for an athletic training degree. Standard prerequisite classes are human anatomy, human physiology, kinesiology, biomechanics, exercise physiology, nutrition, personal health, and a certain number of observation hours completed under a certified athletic trainer (ATC).

=== Graduate school in athletic training and related fields ===
According to the Commission on Accreditation of Athletic Training Education, there are 250 schools in the US with an accredited athletic training master's program for those who want to pursue further education. These programs are typically two years in length. While enrolled in one of these programs, the athletic trainer may gain clinical experience and receive a stipend through a graduate assistant internship.

=== Graduate assistant internships ===
Typical responsibilities for graduate assistant interns include administering daily medical care to selected intercollegiate athletic teams, evaluating and documenting athletic injuries, completing administrative duties, serving as an approved clinical instructor or clinical instructor in a CAATE-accredited ATEP, and assisting the head athletic trainer. Other internships may include working at a high school or clinic, teaching, or researching. Graduate assistant positions are generally around 10-month appointments that may be renewable after the first year and sometimes include additional summer work.

=== Accredited programs ===
CAATE evaluates athletic training programs to ensure that they follow the standards for entry-level athletic training programs. Evaluations may take place every three to seven years. Completing the CAATE accredited education program is a part of the criteria that determines a candidate's eligibility for the Board of Certification (BOC) examination.

== Organizations ==
The National Athletic Trainers Association (NATA) is the professional organization for athletic trainers in the United States. NATA is divided into 10 geographical districts which each appoint their own agendas and board members. Each district consists of about 3-6 states/territories which have a director that serves on the NATA Board of Directors. Every state has its own state athletic training association that acts similar to the district associations with their own board members. The state associations answer to the district associations and NATA.

Before the formation of NATA, athletic trainers occupied a somewhat insecure place in the athletic program. Since then, considerable professional advancement has been made in the field.

As well as the NATA, there is also the World Federation of Athletic Training & Therapy (WFATT) which began in 1998 but was founded in 2000. The WFATT's mission statement includes "Athletic Training & Therapy will be recognized as an essential part of multidisciplinary healthcare teams worldwide". Across 4 continents, 12 countries and in 42 member associations, there's well over 50,000 athletic trainers registered. To start the WFATT, the US and Canada (Canadian Athletic Therapists Association) went and promoted athletic training in various countries through workshops.
