= William Livingstone Memorial Light =

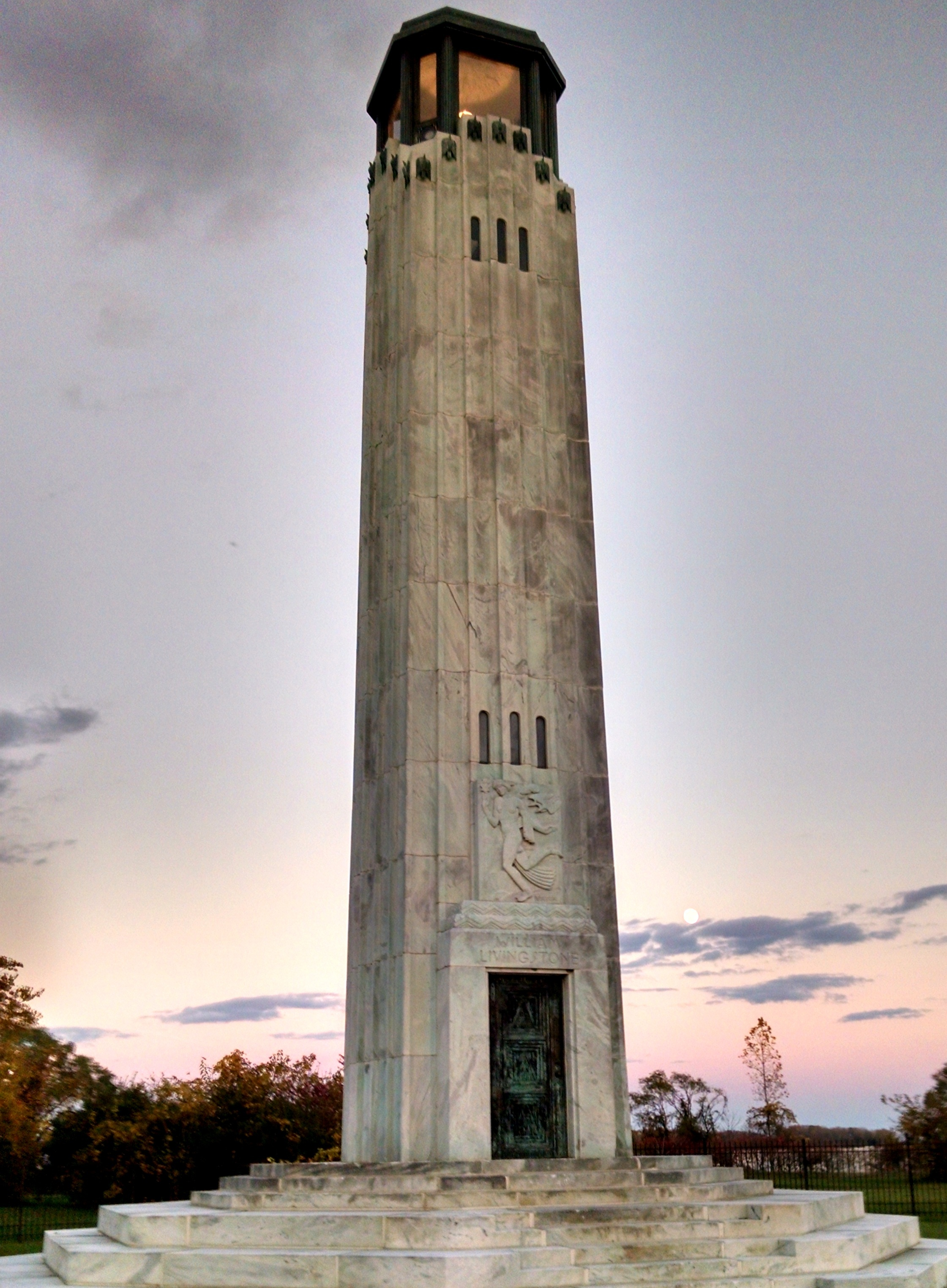
- Location: Belle Isle, Detroit, Michigan
- Coordinates: 42.347°N 82.954°W

Tower
- Constructed: 1930
- Construction: Marble
- Height: 58 feet (18 m)
- Shape: Octagonal

Light
- Focal height: 17.5 m (57 ft)
- Lens: Fourth-order Fresnel lens, sixth-order Fresnel lens
- Intensity: 8,600 candlepower
- Range: 14 miles (23 km)
- Characteristic: Oc W 4s

The William Livingstone Memorial Light is an Art Deco lighthouse located at the northeast end of Belle Isle in Detroit, Michigan, facing Lake St. Clair. It was designed by Géza Maróti and built by Albert Kahn in 1930. It is the only marble lighthouse in the United States, and one of two memorial lighthouses in Michigan, the other one being the Manning Memorial Light.

== History ==
=== Belle Isle Lighthouse ===
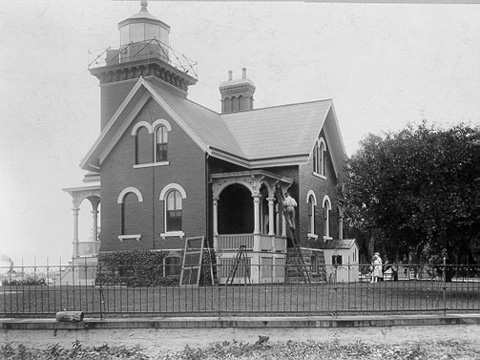
Belle Isle Lighthouse

The Livingstone Memorial Light is not the first lighthouse to have been built on Belle Isle. In 1881, Congress appropriated $10,000 for the construction of a lighthouse on the island, which was constructed on The Strand, less than a mile southwest of the Memorial Light's present location. It was built to prevent ships from running aground on the then-undeveloped Belle Isle. Belle Isle Lighthouse was a square, red-brick tower with an attached two-story lighthouse keeper's house. The light housed a fourth-order Fresnel Lens. This lighthouse was automated in 1930, and the attached house hosted the Detroit superintendent of the United States Lighthouse Service for the next ten years. As park trees had started to obscure the lighthouse, its functions were moved to a nearby combination flagpole and light mast. The first lighthouse was abandoned in 1940 and demolished in fall 1941, and is now the site of the US Coast Guard Station Belle Isle.

=== Livingstone Memorial Light ===
The William Livingstone Memorial Light was dedicated to William Livingstone Jr. (1844-1925), a prominent Canadian-born citizen of Detroit who was president of the Dime Savings Bank, owner of the Detroit Journal, and longtime president of the Lake Carriers Association, an organization representing the US-flag Great Lakes fleet. In the latter capacity, he played an important role in the development of shipping on the Great Lakes, and lent his name to Livingstone Channel, a dredged shipping channel in the Detroit River, and a lake freighter. He lived in the now-demolished William Livingstone House.

When Livingstone died in 1925, the Lake Carriers Association and Detroit citizens raised money to build permanent monument dedicated to him. A plot of land at the east end of Belle Isle Park was donated by the City, and Géza Maróti and Albert Kahn, who were already collaborating on the Fisher Building, were hired to design the structure. Construction on the lighthouse, a tribute to Livingstone as the promoter of shipping, was completed in 1930. It began operation on April 6, 1930, and was dedicated on October 17, 1930, the fifth anniversary of Livingstone's death. H.D. King, who would become Commissioner of the Lighthouse Service in 1935, gave the dedicatory address.

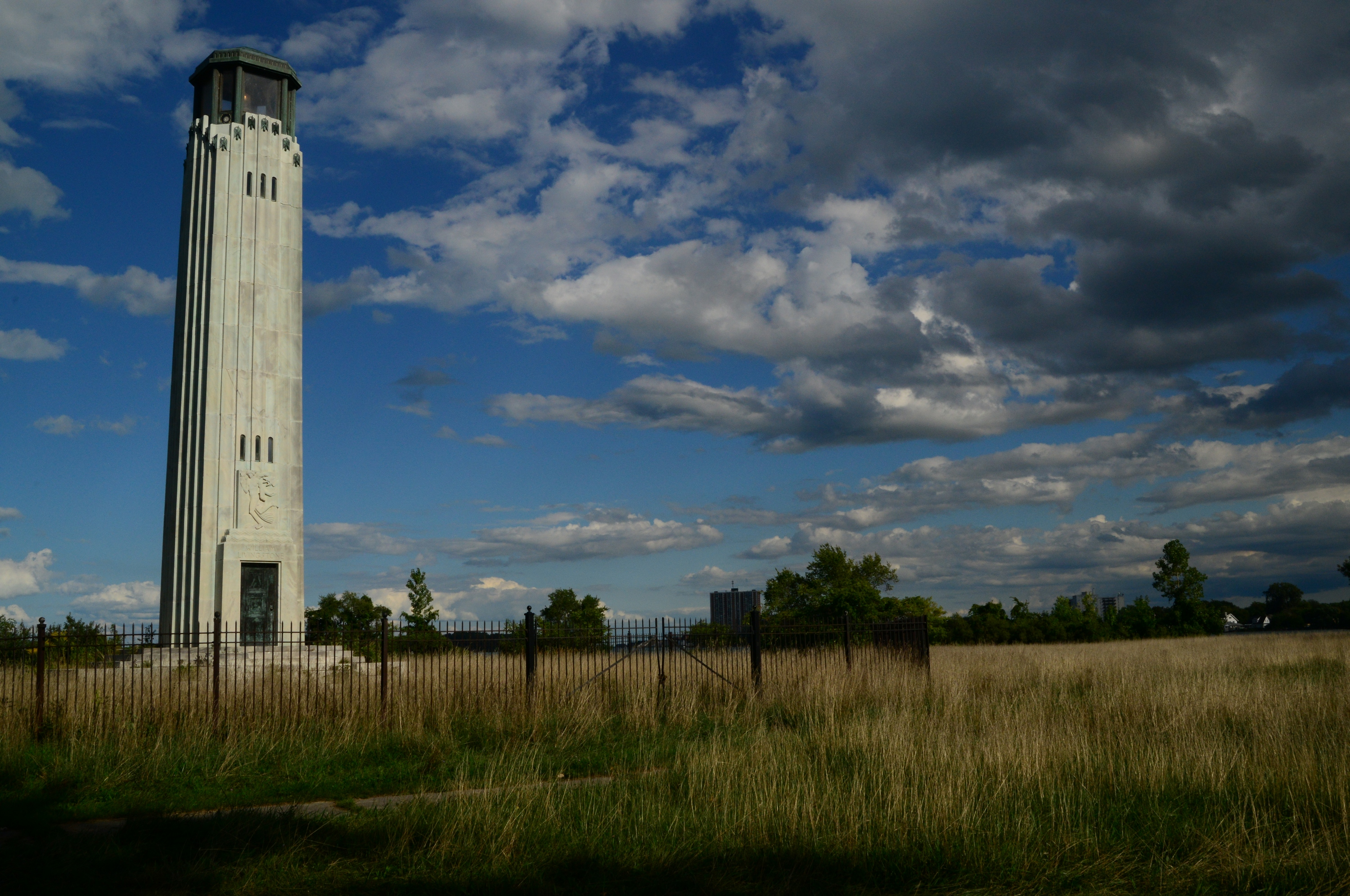
The lighthouse in 2012

The lighthouse cost $100,000 to build, and takes the form of a 58-foot tall, octagonal fluted shaft of Georgia marble. The Detroit Free Press stated that it was designed by Maróti and its construction was supervised by Kahn. The base of the column features two sculptural works by Maróti: a large relief above the door depicting humanity overcoming nature, and a marble dedication plaque held up by putti on the other side of the structure. The grooves of the column are topped by bronze eagles. The bronze and glass lens, taken from the earlier Belle Isle Lighthouse, houses a fourth-order Fresnel Lens and four auxiliary reflector lights which generate 8,600 candlepower, and are visible for up to fourteen miles.

The site of the lighthouse was used by the US Army from 1954 to 1969. After the Army left, the lighthouse fell into disrepair, and was repeatedly vandalized, culminating in the 1980 theft of two of the lighthouse's four lights and several brass fixtures. Following this, the lighthouse was fenced off and the door was barricaded, but the lighthouse again fell victim to vandalism one year later. It was restored in the 1990s and continues to operate, its light shining around the clock.
