= Detroit Towers =

Apartment building in Detroit, Michigan

Coordinates: 42.35221°N 82.99340°W

Detroit Towers is a high-rise residential apartment building located in Detroit, Michigan, on the city's near-east side. The building was constructed in 1922, and stands at 22 floors in height. It is used as an apartment building, and was designed in the neo-Gothic architectural style.

== Description ==
- This is a Detroit landmark highrise along the river, just across from Belle Isle.
- Detroit Towers was added to the National Register of Historic Places in 1985.
