= Manning Memorial Light =

Lighthouse in Michigan, United States

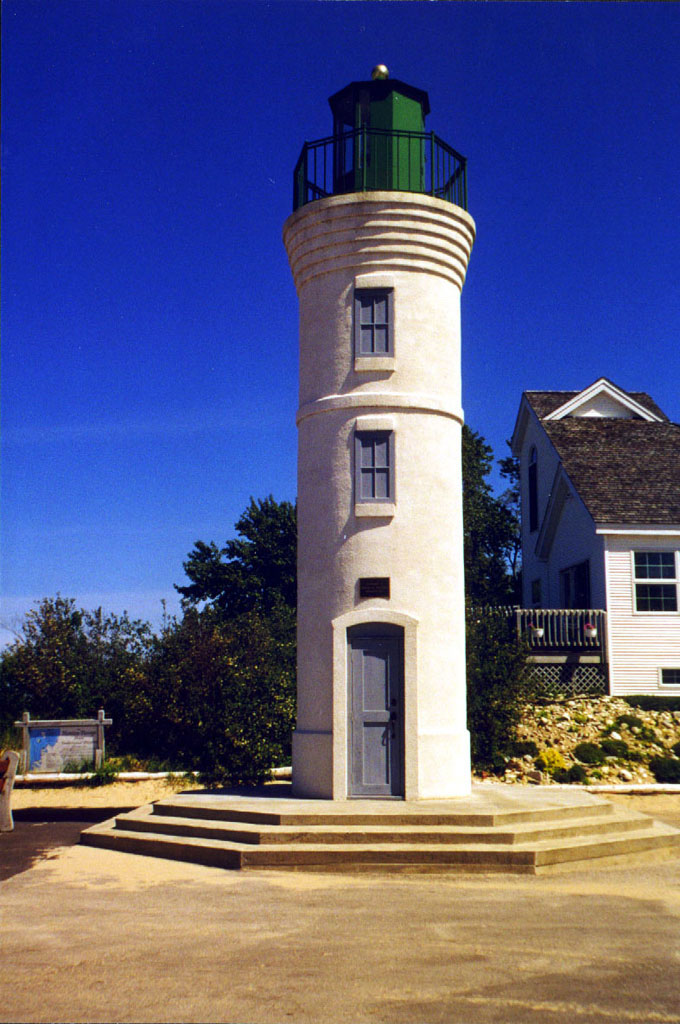
- Location: Near Empire, Michigan
- Coordinates: 44°48′28.531″N 86°15′18.758″W

Tower
- Constructed: 1990
- Height: 38 feet (12 m)

Light
- First lit: 1990
- Focal height: 11.5 m (38 ft)
- Characteristic: Fl W 4s

The Manning Memorial Light, also known as the Robert H. Manning Memorial Lighthouse or Manning Light is a lighthouse located near Empire, Michigan. Mr. Manning was a longtime resident of Empire. Manning enjoyed fishing offshore, and often returned from these boat trips late at night. He often remarked to friends and relatives he wished a lighthouse was in the area to aid that navigation. After his death in 1989, friends and relatives raised funds to build the lighthouse as a memorial. The lighthouse was illuminated in 1990. It is the second newest lighthouse in Michigan—the newest being the Tri-Centennial Light of Detroit -- and one of three memorial lights in Michigan. Another is the William Livingstone Memorial Light.

== Replica ==
A scaled-down replica of this light was built on Lake Havasu at Lake Havasu City, Arizona. The 20-foot (6.1 m) high replica is in Mohave County, Arizona. It was dedicated on February 2, 2003, sponsored by Crazyhorse Campgrounds, and built by members and supporters of the Lake Havasu Lighthouse Club. It is at GPS: 34°28.24′N - 114°21.72′W. The rotating amber beacon flashes at a rate of sixty times a minute. See also List of lighthouses in the United States. Google Maps has a satellite photo of the replica, which is opposite the London Bridge.
