= Coast Guard Station Belle Isle =

US Coast Guard station in Michigan

U.S. Coast Guard Station Belle Isle
- Part of 9th District
- Detroit, Michigan
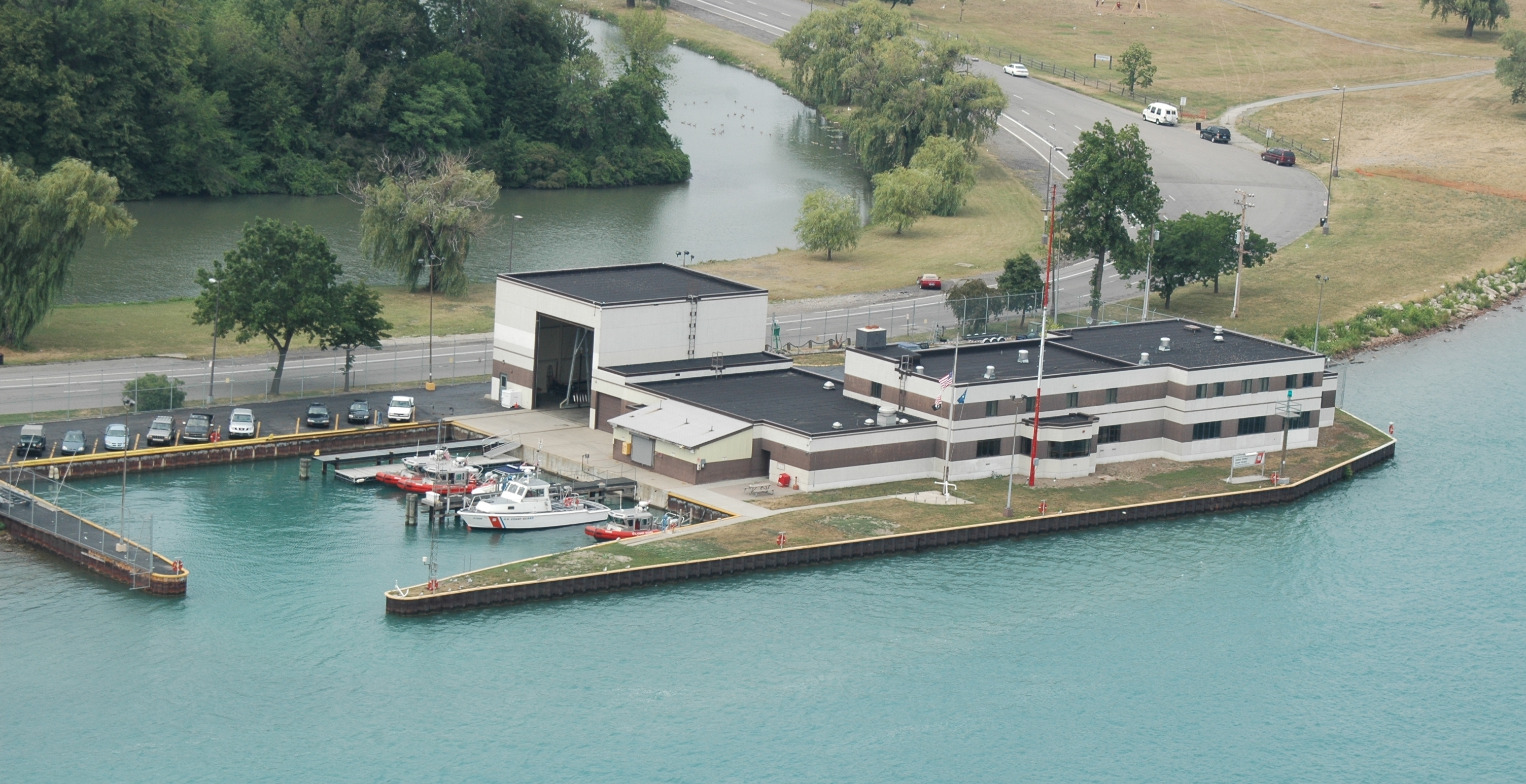

Site information
- Type: Coast Guard Station
- Owner: United States Coast Guard

Location
- Coordinates: 42.34018°N 82.96045°W

Site history
- In use: 1942-present

The United States Coast Guard Station Belle Isle is located on Belle Isle, Michigan, in Detroit and near the mouth of the Detroit River. The property where Station Belle Isle sites was purchased on April 6, 1881, from the city of Detroit for the sum of $1.00. Belle Isle Lighthouse was constructed and a light was first shown on May 15, 1882. That lighthouse occupied the site continuously until construction of the present facilities. During those early years, the land was very swampy and the only way to reach the lighthouse was by boat. The station was completed in 1942 and at the time the station was the most modern on the Great Lakes.
