= Géza Maróti =

Hungarian architect, sculptor, painter, and applied artist

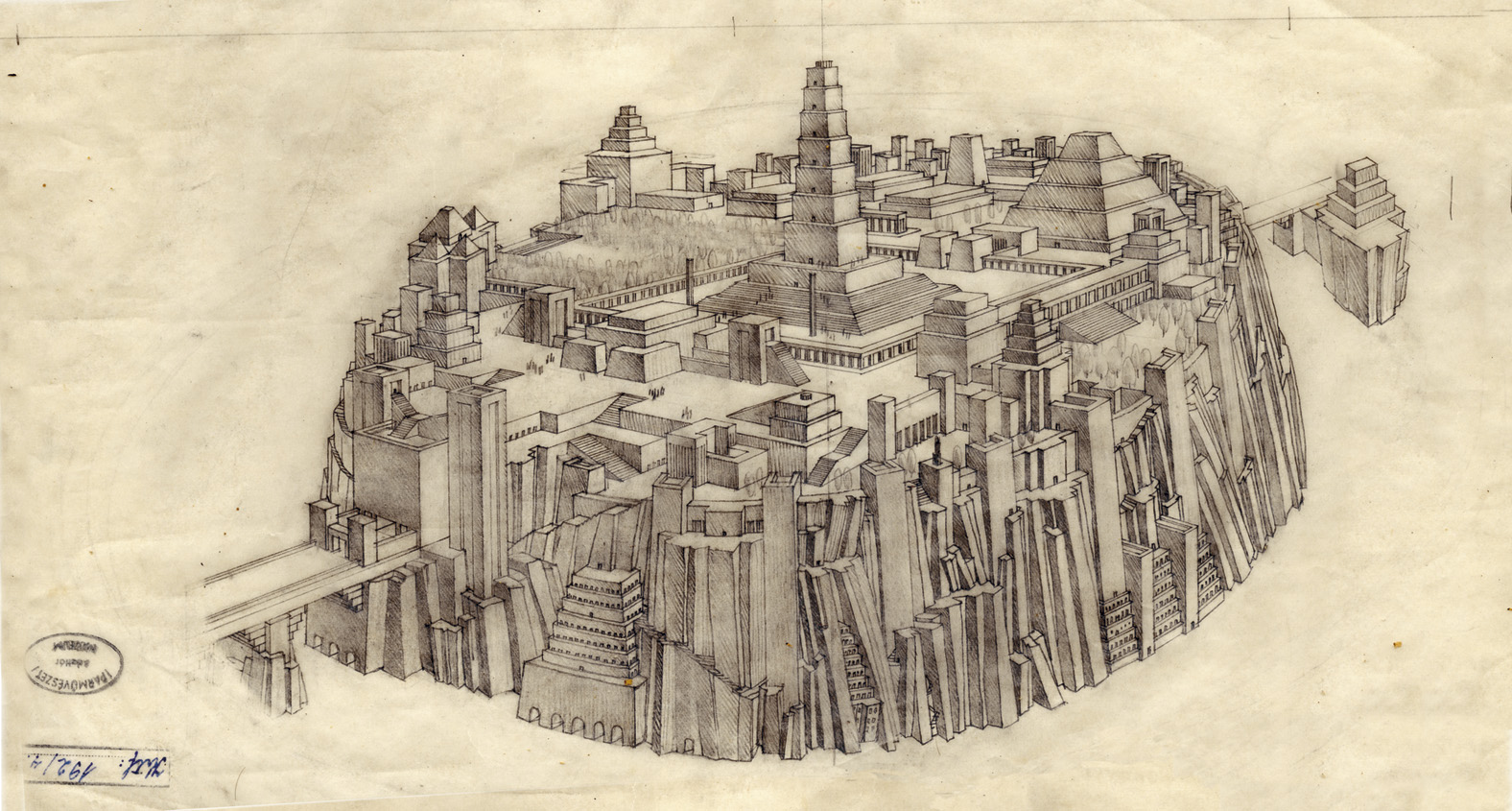
Géza Maróti's plan of Atlantis mock-up

Géza Maróti (1875-1941) was a Hungarian architect, sculptor, painter, and applied artist.

Maróti was from a rural merchant family and began his career as a woodcarver but later went on to complete studies in Budapest and Vienna. He settled in Zebegény before the outbreak of World War I and went on to complete numerous commissions both as an architect and a sculptor for public building projects. His work, a cultural history of Atlantis, is still unpublished.

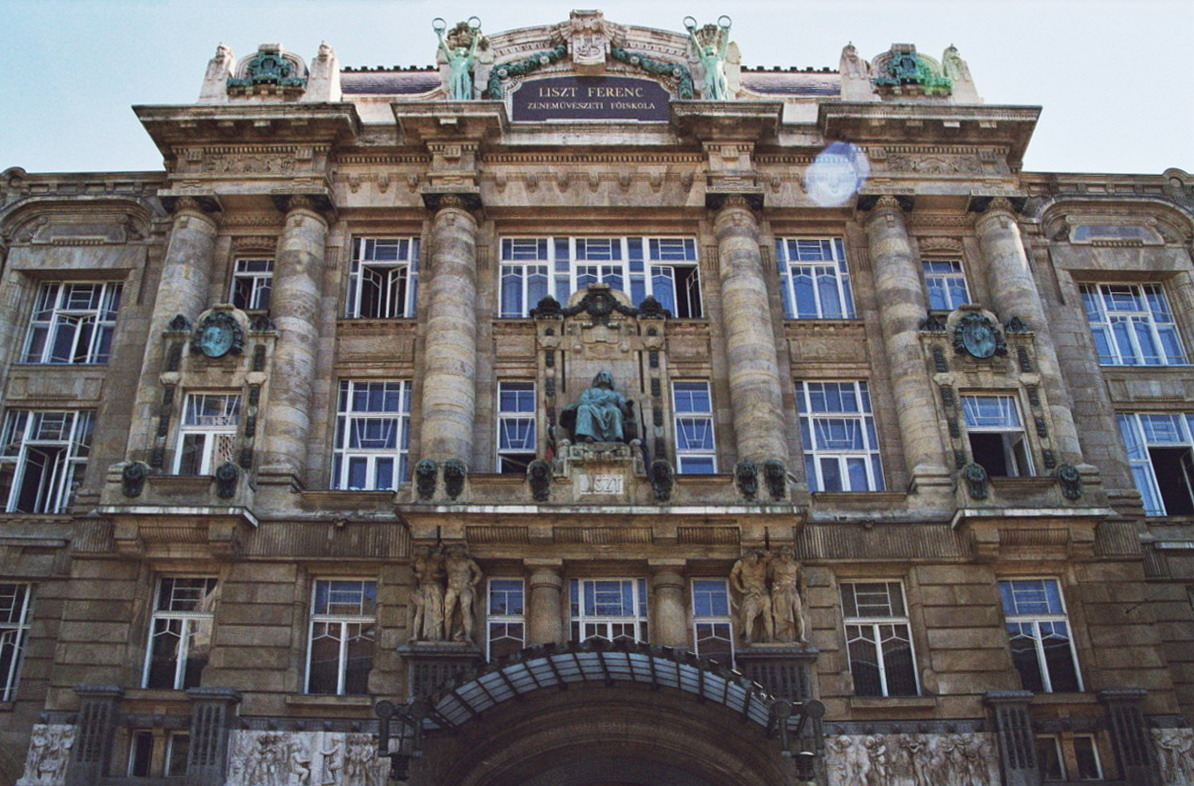
The eclectic building of the Liszt Ferenz Music Academy (1907) in Budapest which is adorned with Maroti's sculptures

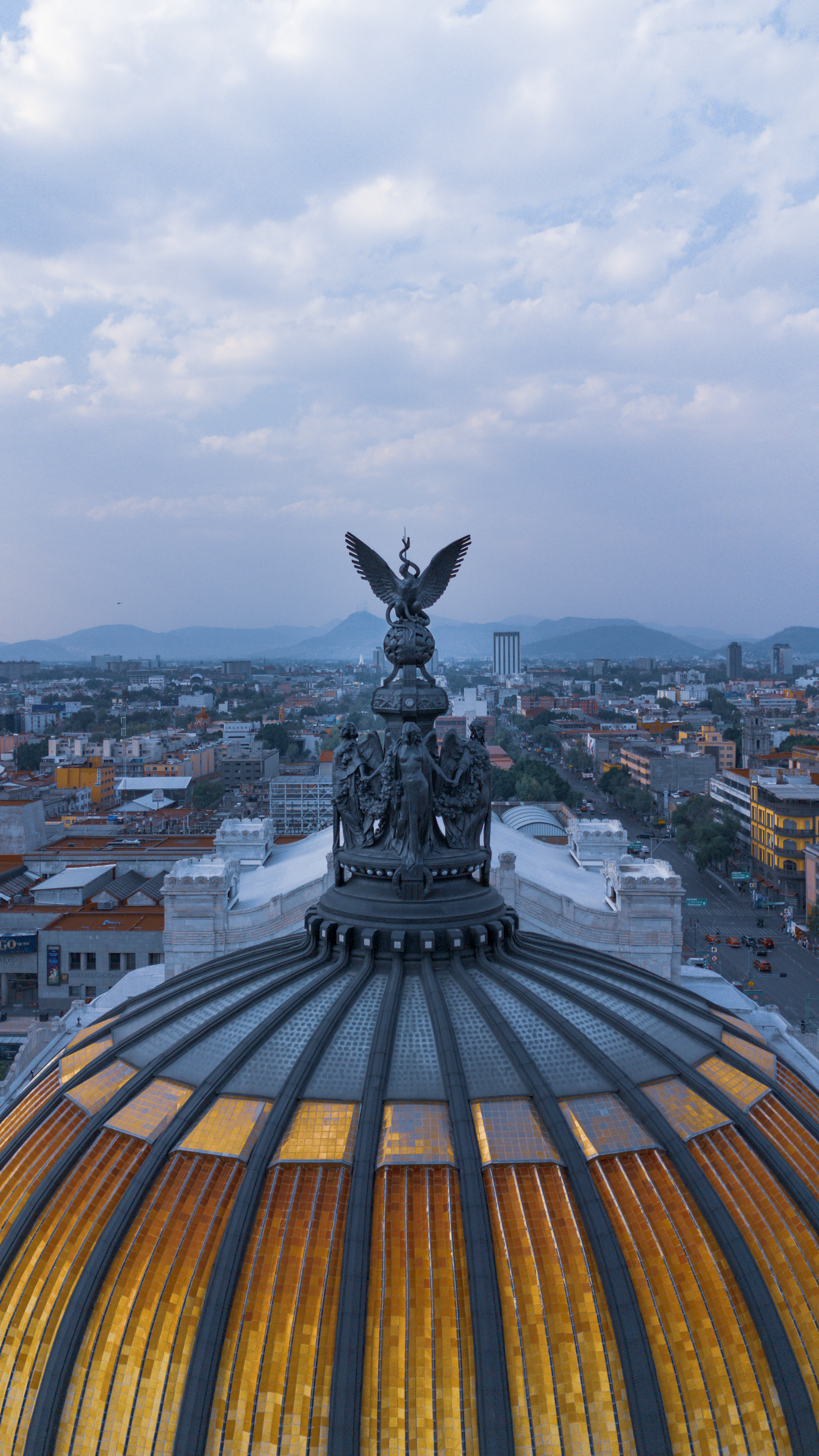
Sculptures on top of the dome of the Palacio de Bellas Artes in Mexico, made in 1909.

== Major works ==
Buildings with sculptures executed by Maróti, unless otherwise indicated.

- 1904–1907. Franz Liszt Academy of Music, Budapest.
- 1905. Gresham Palace, Budapest.
- Lending bank, Budapest.
- Trading Bank, Budapest.
- 1905–1910. Pest National Savings Company, Budapest.
- 1906. International Exhibition Pavilion, Milano. The original burned down, although it won Maróti a number of awards and prizes.
- 1908. Palacio de Bellas Artes, Mexico City, Mexico: dome, sculptures, mosaic work.
- 1911. World Exhibition Pavilion, Turin, Italy.
- 1912–1914. Maróti Villa, Zebegény, Hungary: sculptures and fountains.
- 1927–1932. Detroit, United States. Various bronze and granite sculptures and decorations.
- Detroit: Fisher Building, Livingstone Memorial Lighthouse, Cranbrook Academy of Art Museum, Foreman Bank Building, Hurison Motor Co. Building (likely the Hudson Motor Car Company building), Times Building, S.S. Kresge Building.
- Plans for oval and university sport precinct, Lágymányos, Hungary. (Never built.)
- 1938. Hero's Square with Christ sculpture, Zebegény. Unfinished due to World War II and subsequent Soviet takeover of power.
- 1933–1940. More than 600-page study on the lost city of Atlantis. Finished in German and translated into English, but never published.
