= Belle Isle Park =

River island and public park in Michigan, United States

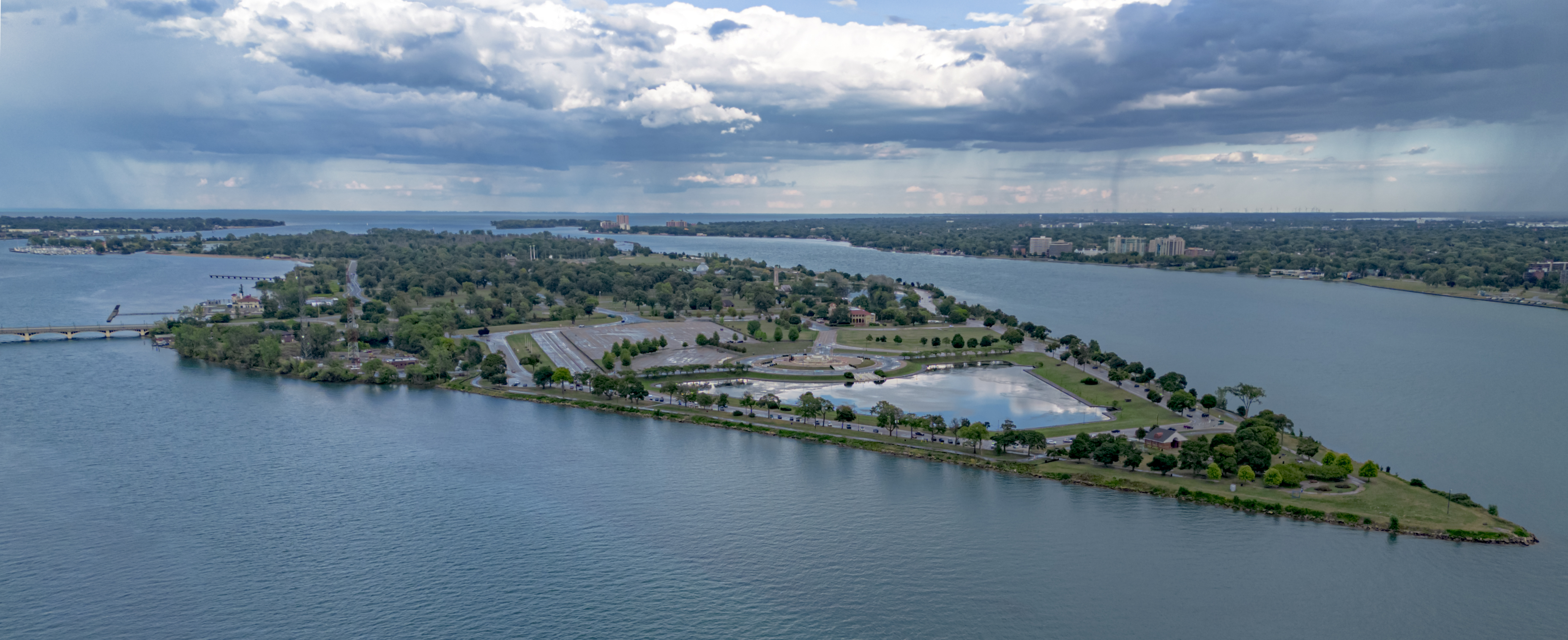
- Aerial view of Belle Isle Park

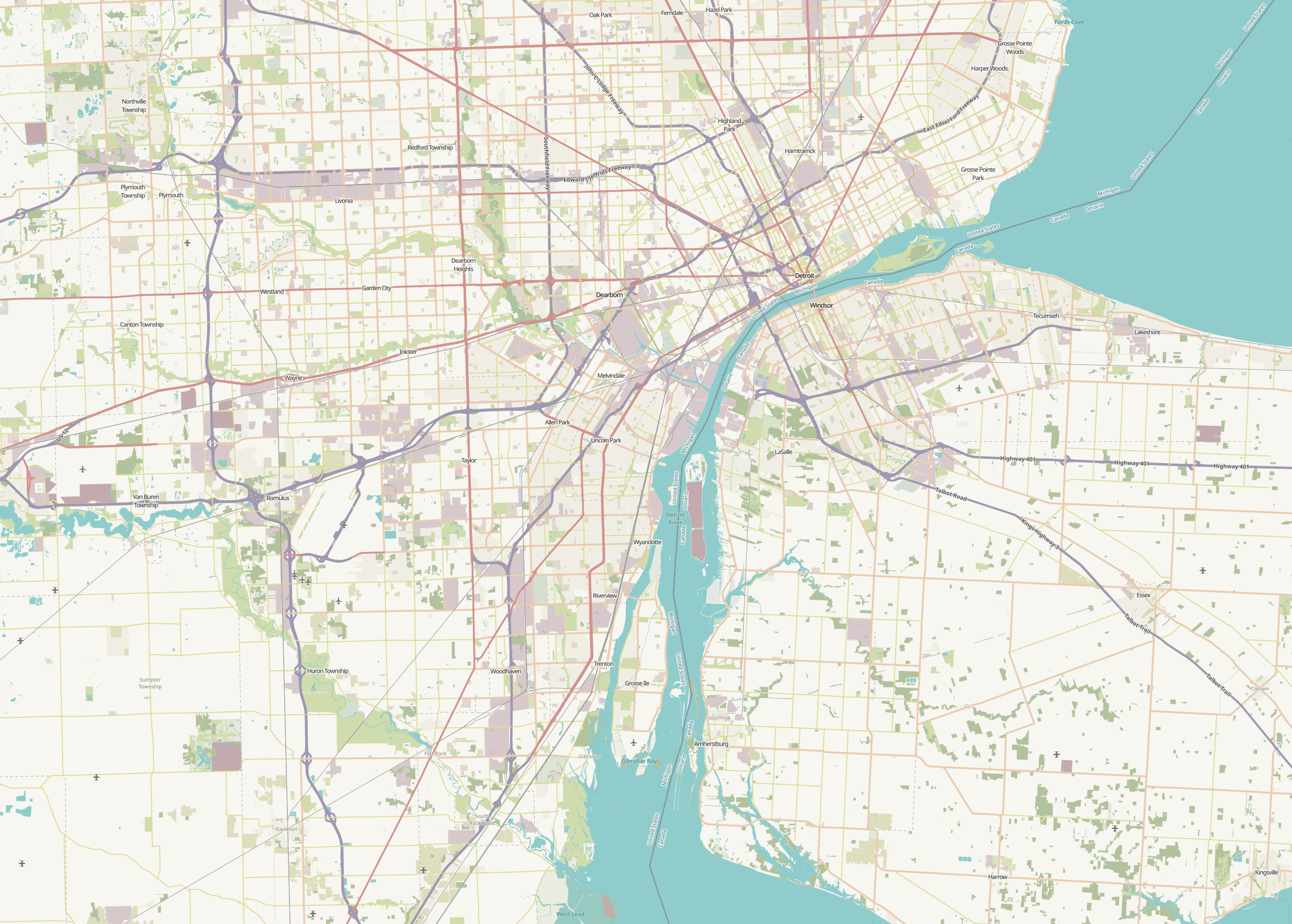
- Location within Wayne County, Michigan Location within Michigan
- Type: State park
- Location: Detroit, Michigan, U.S.
- Coordinates: 42°20′25″N 82°59′12″W
- Area: 982 acres (397 ha)
- Created: 1845 (2014 as a state park)
- Operator: State of Michigan
- Website: www.belleislepark.org
- Belle Isle
- U.S. National Register of Historic Places
- U.S. Historic district
- Michigan State Historic Site
- Location: Detroit River
- Architect: Frederick Law Olmsted
- NRHP reference No.: 74000999
- Added to NRHP: February 25, 1974

Belle Isle Park, known simply as Belle Isle (/ˌbɛl ˈaɪl/), is a 982-acre (1.534 sq mi; 397 ha) island park in Detroit, Michigan, developed in the late 19th century. It consists of Belle Isle, an island in the Detroit River, as well as several surrounding islets. The U.S.-Canada border is in the channel south of Belle Isle.

Owned by the city of Detroit, Belle Isle is managed as a state park by the Michigan Department of Natural Resources through a 30-year lease initiated in 2013; it was previously a city park. Belle Isle Park is the largest city-owned island park in the United States, and Belle Isle is the third largest island in the Detroit River, after Grosse Ile and Fighting Island. Belle Isle is the second most-visited state park in the U.S., after Niagara Falls State Park in New York. It is connected to mainland Detroit by the MacArthur Bridge.

Belle Isle Park is home to the Belle Isle Aquarium, the Belle Isle Conservatory, the Belle Isle Nature Center, the James Scott Memorial Fountain, the Dossin Great Lakes Museum, a municipal golf course, a half-mile (800 m) swimming beach, and numerous other monuments and attractions. It is also the site of a Coast Guard station. The Detroit Yacht Club is located on an adjacent island, connected to Belle Isle by a bridge.

== History ==
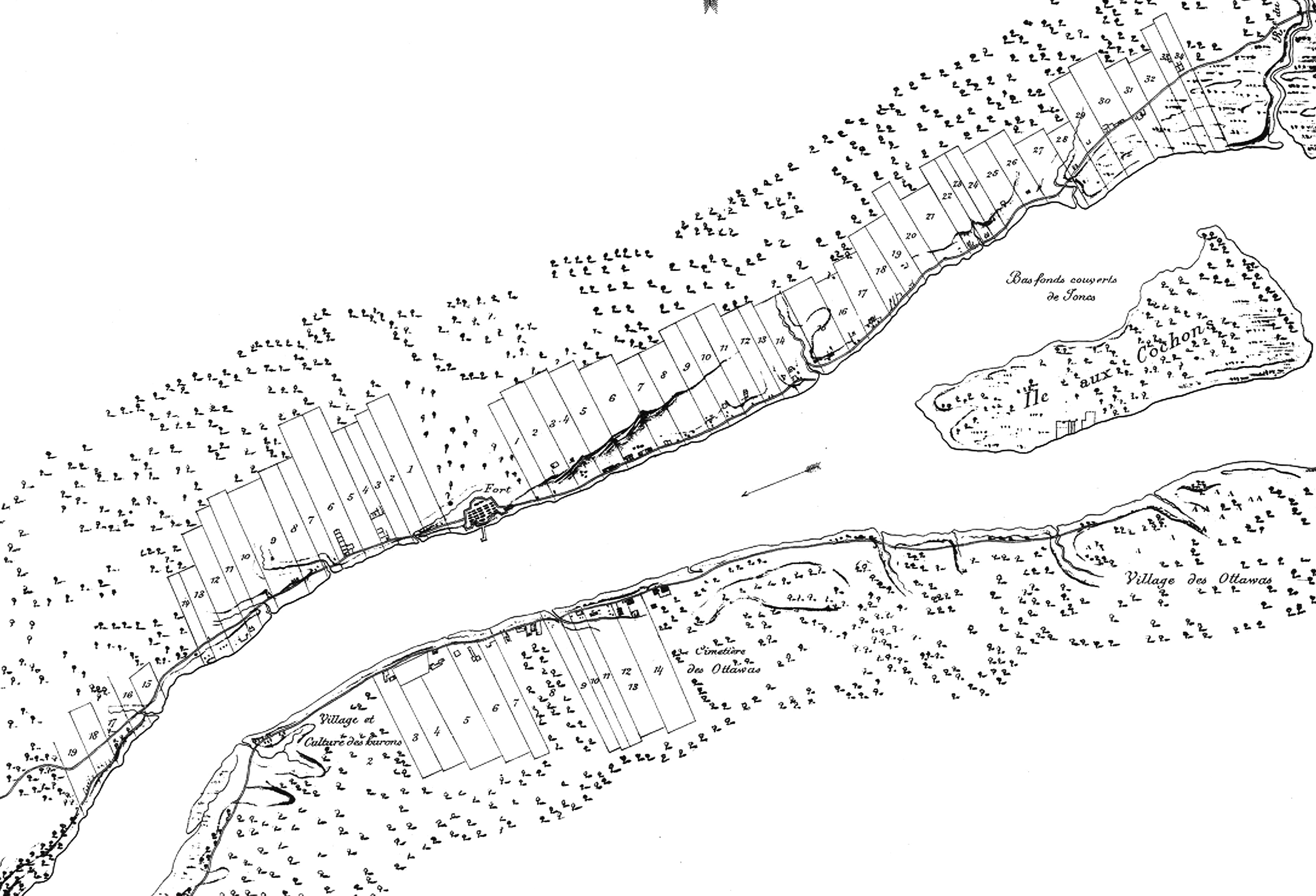
"Pig Island" (Île aux Cochons) on a French map of 1796

The island was settled by French colonists in the 18th century, who named it Île aux Cochons (Hog Island). They allowed their livestock to roam free on the island.

During the Revolutionary War, hundreds of U.S. prisoners of war and their families were held on Hog Island around 1780 to 1782. The prisoners, including Isaac Ruddell, founder of Ruddell's Fort, were taken by the British Army in battles at Ruddell's Fort and Martin's Station in Kentucky on June 26, 1780.

Following his victory in the War of 1812, American General Alexander Macomb, Jr. was assigned to this region and owned the island as his estate. He was later appointed as Commanding General of the US Army. A monument to him was erected in the Washington Boulevard Historic District in downtown Detroit.

On July 4, 1845, a picnic party was held on the island; attendees decided to change its name to "Belle Isle" in honor of Isabelle Cass, daughter of Governor and General Lewis Cass. The name Belle Isle (an archaic spelling of Belle Île) means "beautiful island" in French.

The city planned to develop the island as a park and hired American urban park designer Frederick Law Olmsted in the 1880s to design it. He is known for his design of Central Park in New York City. Only some elements of his design were completed.

The 1908 Belle Isle Casino building is not used as a gambling facility; rather, it serves for occasional public events. Highlights of Belle Isle include a botanical garden and the Belle Isle Conservatory (1904). Both the conservatory and the adjacent aquarium were designed by Detroit architect Albert Kahn, who designed Cadillac Place and the Ford Rouge Factory, now recognized as city and national landmarks.

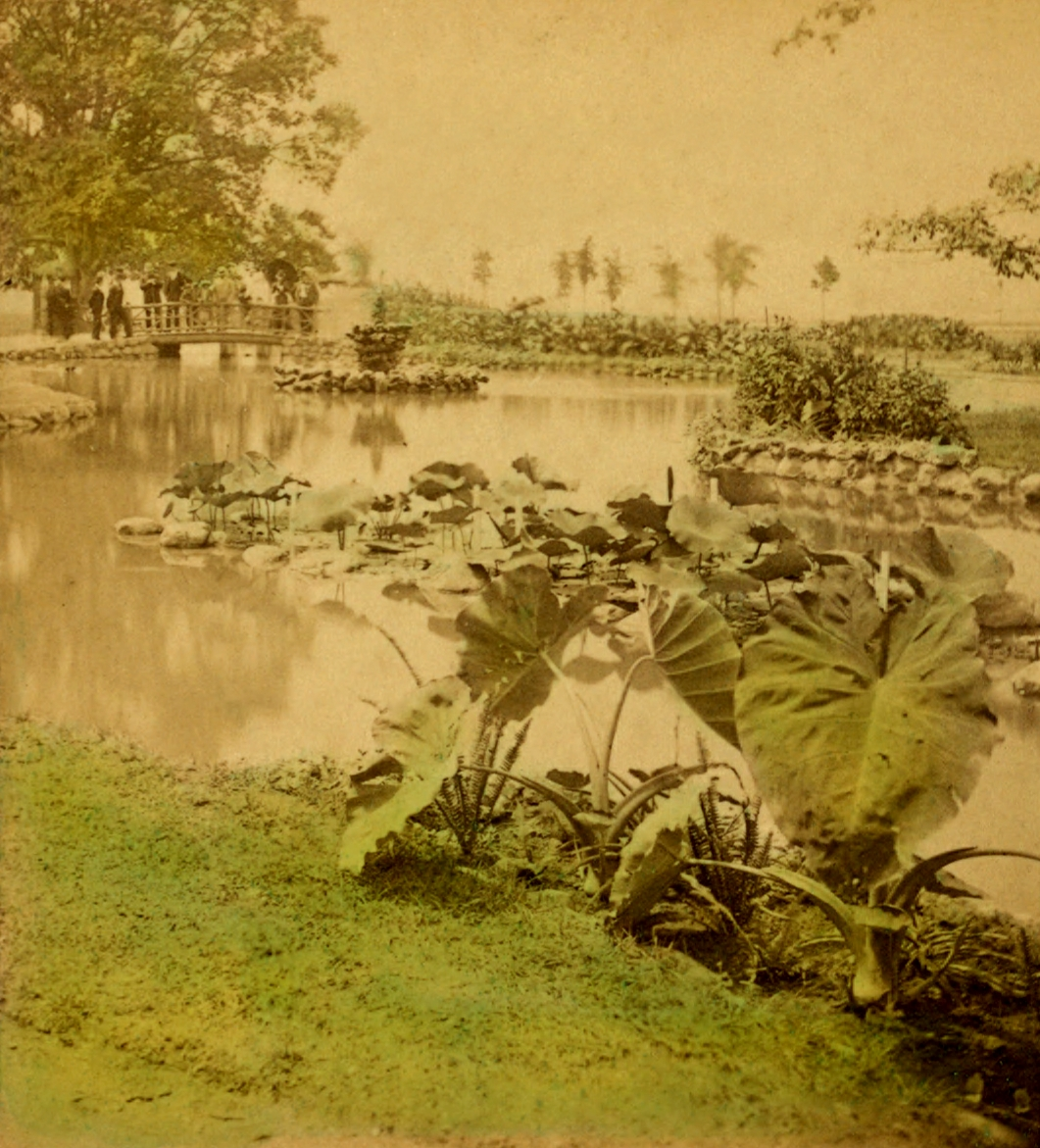
Interior waterways in the park shown in a c. 1880 image, soon after the park's creation

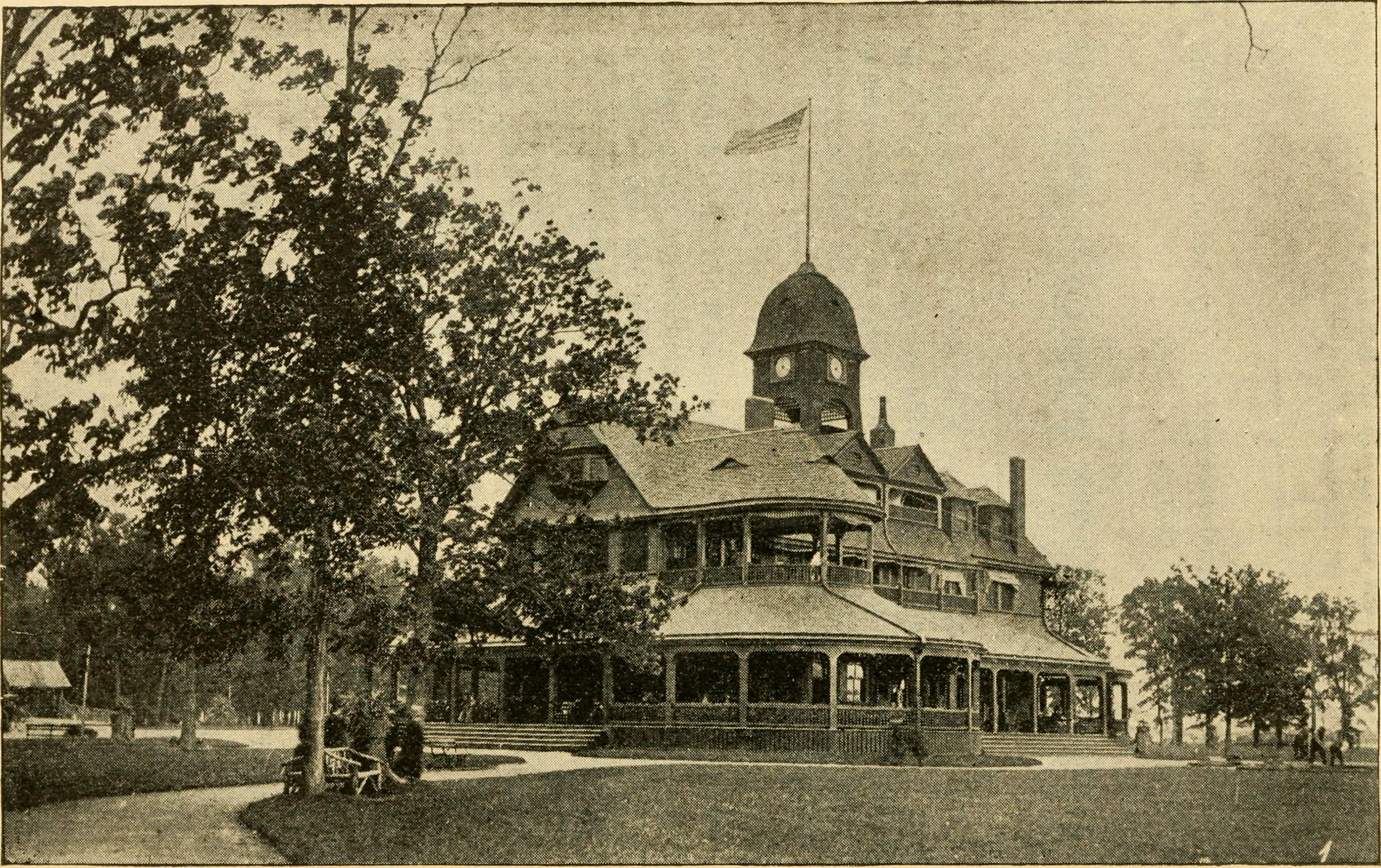
The old Belle Isle Casino, designed by Mason & Rice and built in 1884. It was demolished and replaced in 1908.

One night in 1908, Byron Carter of Cartercar stopped to help a stranded motorist on Belle Isle. When he cranked her Cadillac, it kicked back and broke his jaw. Complications from the injury resulted in his contracting pneumonia, and he died. Henry Leland, founder of Cadillac Motors, said that "The Cadillac car will kill no more men if we can help it". He hired Charles Kettering, who established Delco and developed the electric self-starter. This soon became standard on all automobiles.

Architect Cass Gilbert designed Belle Isle's James Scott Memorial Fountain, completed in 1925. Gilbert's other works include the United States Supreme Court Building in Washington, DC. William Livingstone Memorial Light, the only marble lighthouse in the United States, is located on the east end of the island, and features sumptuous materials and architecture. It was named for the president of the Lakes Carriers Association, who advocated safety and navigational improvements in Great Lakes shipping.

During World War II, the US military used the island park for training. They also staged a re-enactment of a Pacific island invasion by the Navy and Marine Corps. The island was temporarily renamed Bella Jima, and Detroiters witnessed an island invasion without the bloodshed. This event was conducted after the successful US invasion of Iwo Jima.

At one time, the island housed a canoe concession, which provided rental canoes and stored private ones. Canoe riders often stopped at the nearby Remick Band Shell, which hosted regular concerts from 1950 to 1980. The band shell replaced an earlier facility and provided more amenities for performers and audience members. It was constructed at a cost of $150,000 and was named for resident Jerome H. Remick, who owned the world's largest music publishing house at the time.

The Belle Isle Golf Course opened in 1922. The Detroit Yacht Club building dates to 1923 and still houses an active private sailing club; it also offers swimming and other country club amenities. The Activities Building was the site of a restaurant. The Flynn Pavilion (1949) was designed by Eero Saarinen and used for ice skating rental.

A ferry service to the island existed from 1840 to 1957, although the bridge was completed to the island in 1923. Riding stables were housed in an 1863 market building that was relocated from Detroit to the island in the 1890s. The building was disassembled and stored by Greenfield Village in the 2000s. The park headquarters and police station are each located in 1860s-era houses.

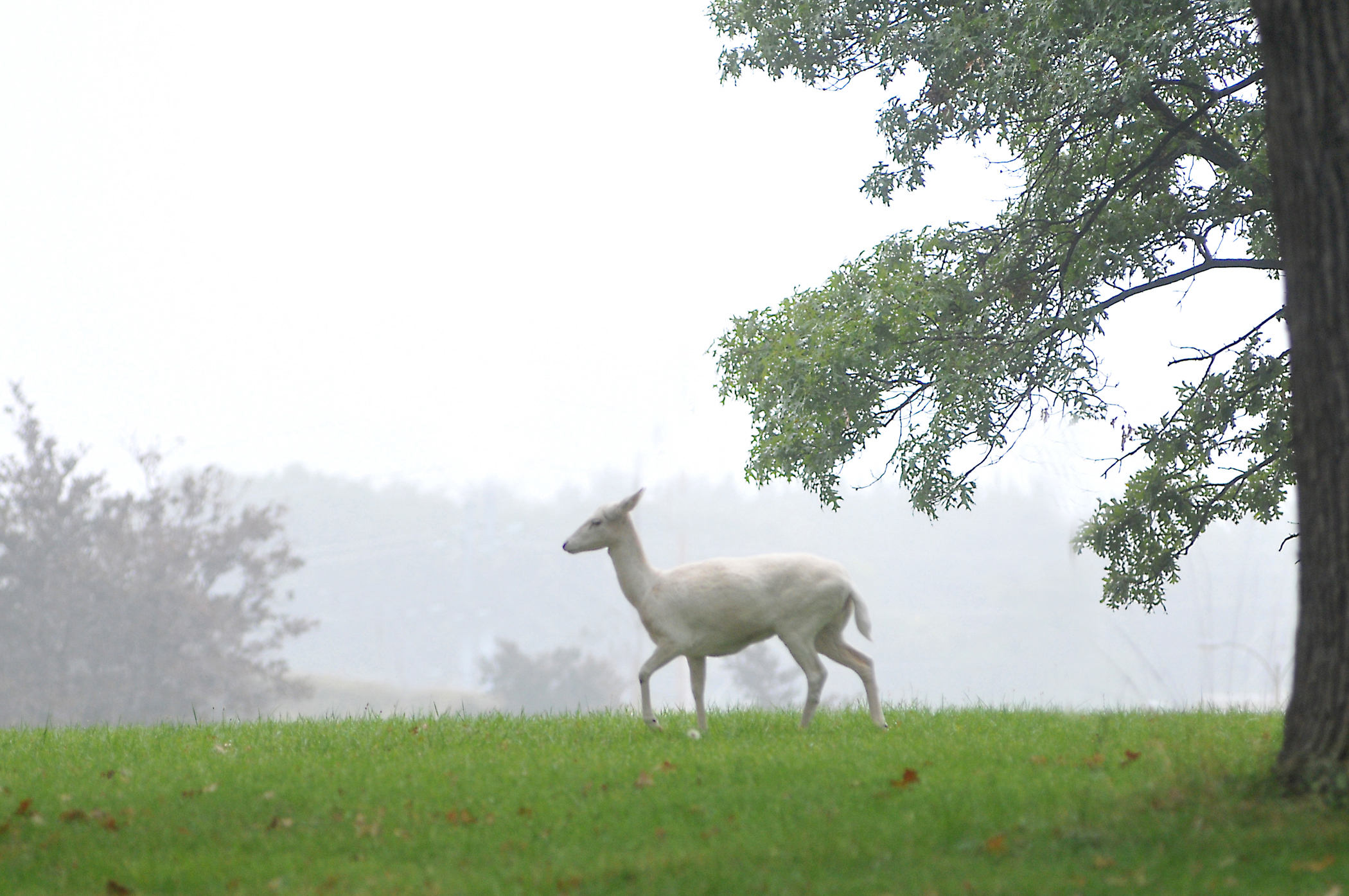
Many fallow deer including the "white" variety were formerly widespread on the island.

From the 1890s, the island was home to a large herd of European fallow deer. But this isolated population fell prey to disease in the late 1990s as a result of cyclic inbreeding. In 2004, the last of the 300 animals were captured and moved to the Detroit Zoo and nature center, located on Belle Isle. The children's zoo on the island and the aquarium closed due to budget constraints.

The Belle Isle Aquarium reopened on August 18, 2012, and is now run by the Belle Isle Conservancy. It originally opened on August 18, 1904, and was the oldest continually operating public aquarium in North America when it closed on April 3, 2005. The aquarium was operated by the Detroit Zoological Society prior to the 2005 closure. It is open to the public from 10:00 am to 4:00 pm from Thursday to Sunday, free of charge. The 10,000 sq ft (930 m^{2}) historic building features a single large gallery with an arched ceiling covered in green glass tile to evoke an underwater feeling. Additional recreational options in the early 21st century include a nature center, wheelchair accessible nature trail, fishing piers, playgrounds, picnic shelters, and handball, tennis and basketball courts, baseball fields, and cricket pitch.

After years of economic problems, in 2013, the city of Detroit declared bankruptcy. A State Emergency Manager was appointed by the state government to oversee the city's finances. As part of the process, the state proposed taking over Belle Isle and converting it into a state park. Michigan Governor Rick Snyder signed a lease on October 1, 2013, to lease the park from the city for 30 years; while the city council rejected that offer in mid-October, the Michigan Emergency Loan Board opted for the state's proposal on November 12, 2013. It set a 90-day transition period beginning on December 1, 2013, to turn the park operations over to the state. As part of the deal, the state promised to make up to $20 million in improvements to the park over the next three years. Belle Isle formally became a state park on February 10, 2014.

Users of the state park entering by car or motorcycle must either pay the standard state park user entrance fee or have a Michigan Recreational Passport sticker on the license plate of their vehicles. There is no charge for those who enter the park on foot or by bicycle.

Belle Isle was the top-visited state park in Michigan in 2016, receiving more than 4 million visitors. Since the state took control in 2014, it has invested $32 million in renovation and improvements in the park.

The park is one of the termini for the cross-state Iron Belle Trail, which consists of separate hiking and biking trails.

On August 31, 2020, Belle Isle hosted a city-wide memorial to commemorate 1,500 victims of the COVID-19 pandemic. Mayor Mike Duggan declared the day as Detroit Memorial Day to honor the victims of the disease.

On October 1, 2025, two men found and captured an apparently abandoned pet baby alligator that had been swimming along the shore of the island. It was turned over to the Great Lakes Serpentarium in Westland, Michigan.

== Events ==
=== Auto racing ===
In 1992, a temporary street race circuit was constructed on the island for CART races. The island hosted ten events at Belle Isle from 1992 to 2001, and racing resumed in 2007 as part of the IndyCar Series and American Le Mans Series.

On December 18, 2008, the scheduled race for 2009 was canceled. The automotive economic crisis, and its impact on the Detroit area, was the primary reason. Roger Penske did not rule out a return in the future.

On September 20, 2011, race organizers gained approval from Detroit City Council to use the updated track and support area on Belle Isle. On October 11, 2011, it was announced that the race would return in 2012. Beginning in 2013 the IndyCar races ran as a doubleheader, with one race on Saturday and another one on Sunday, for the same distance. The starting grid for both races was determined in two separate qualifying sessions held a few hours before each race. The race weekends usually featured IndyCar as well as IMSA SportsCar Championship.

The race continued to be held annually, until June 2022, when it was announced that it would move to Downtown Detroit for 2023 onward.

=== Music and theater ===
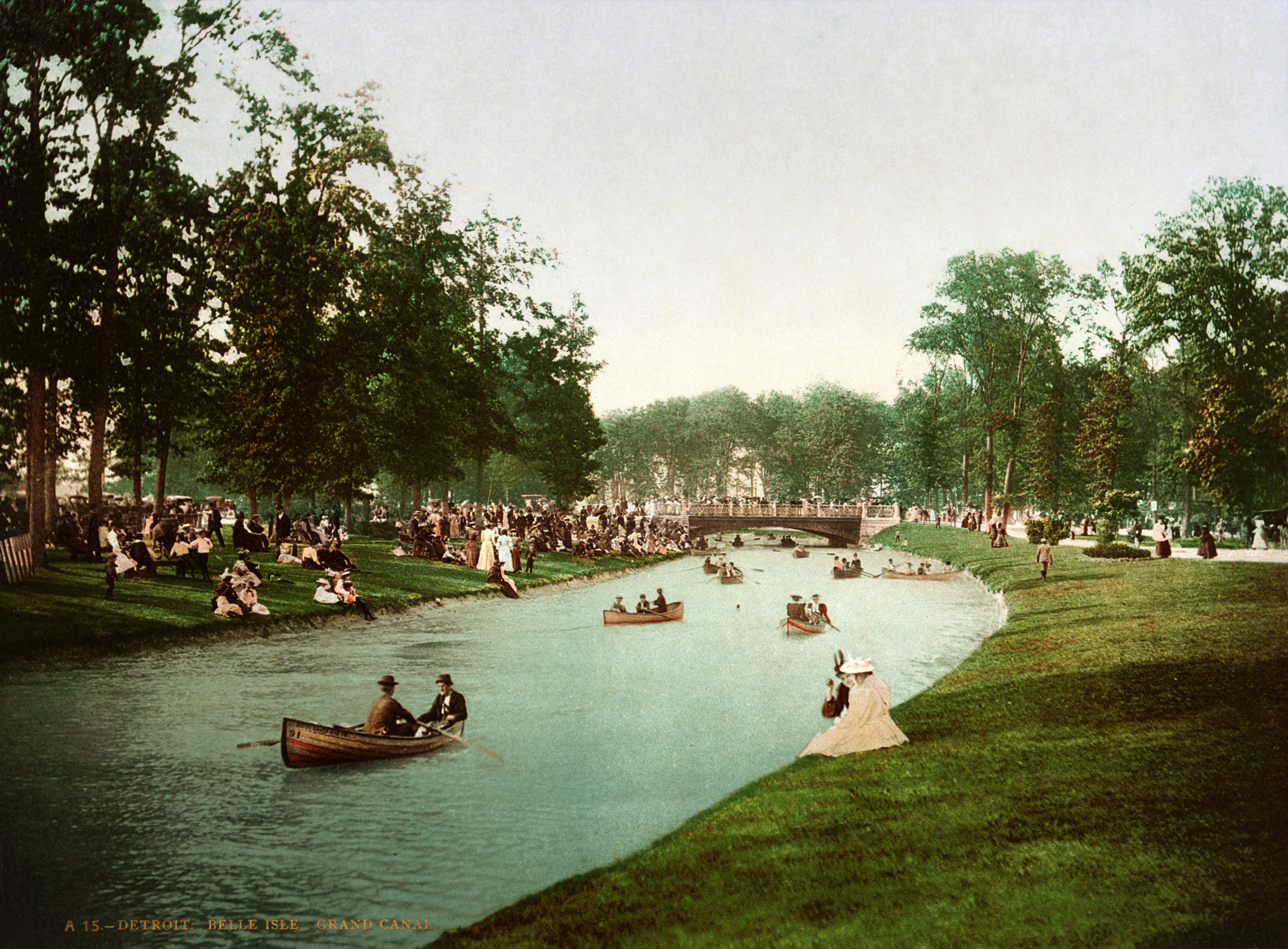
Boating on the Grand Canal in the early 1900s

During the 1950s, the Aqua Follies performed at Belle Isle Park, near the Scott Fountain.

Plans are underway to renew the tradition of Summer concert band performances for 2018 at the Remick Band Shell. Various Detroit-area concert bands are planning on performing on Sunday afternoons at the Band Shell. For instance, the Heritage Concert Band of Troy is scheduled to team with the Belgian American Association Band for a joint performance on July 29, 2018, at 1:30PM (tentative time). Many of the musicians belong to both concert bands.

It was announced that Belle Isle would be the site of heavy metal band Metallica's 2013 Orion Music + More Festival, guaranteeing $100,000 in revenue. On December 26, 2012, Detroit Councilman Ken Cockrel Jr. confirmed rumors that the city was in the process of confirming 2014 and 2015 as well to take place at Belle Isle. However, in 2013 the festival series was canceled permanently due to financial constraints.

== Attractions ==
=== James Scott Memorial Fountain ===
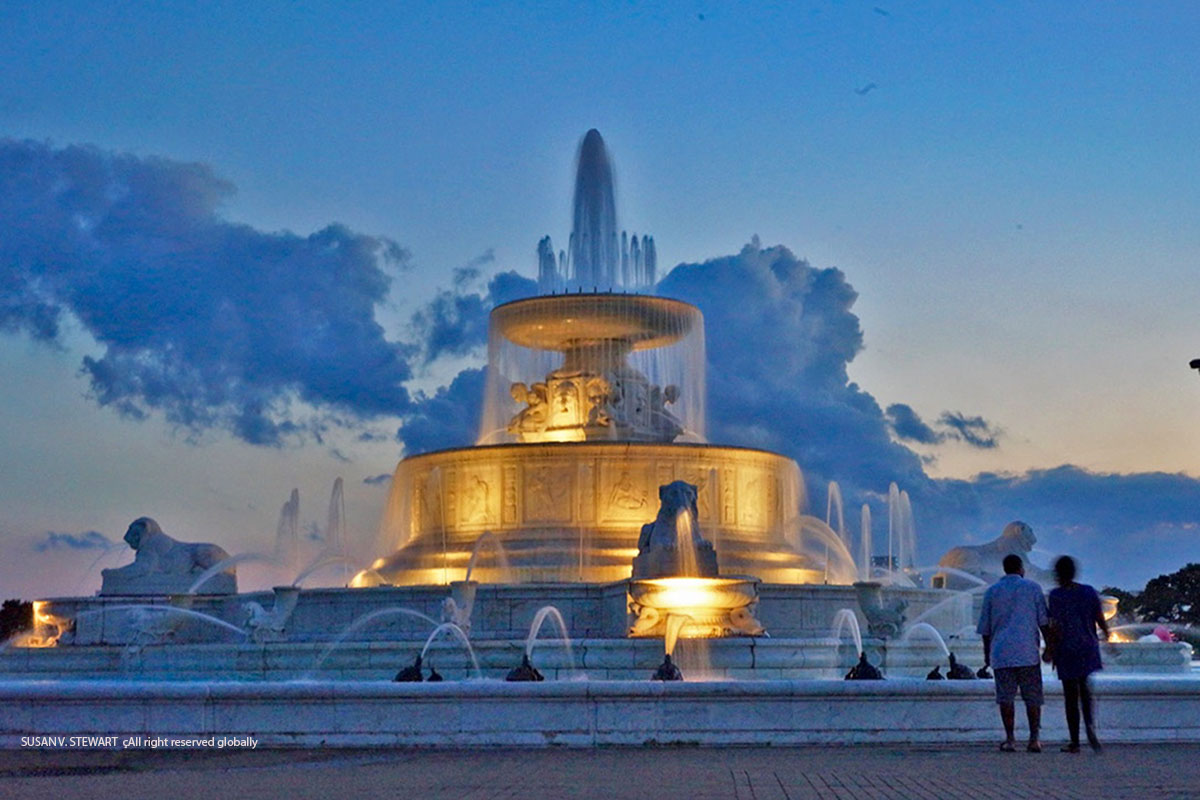
James Scott Memorial Fountain

The James Scott Memorial Fountain is a monument located in Belle Isle Park. Designed by architect Cass Gilbert and sculptor Herbert Adams, the fountain was completed in 1925 at a cost of $500,000. The lower bowl has a diameter of 510 ft (160 m) and the central spray reaches 125 ft (38 m). The fountain honors the controversial James Scott, who left $200,000 to the City of Detroit for a fountain in tribute to himself.

=== Belle Isle Aquarium ===
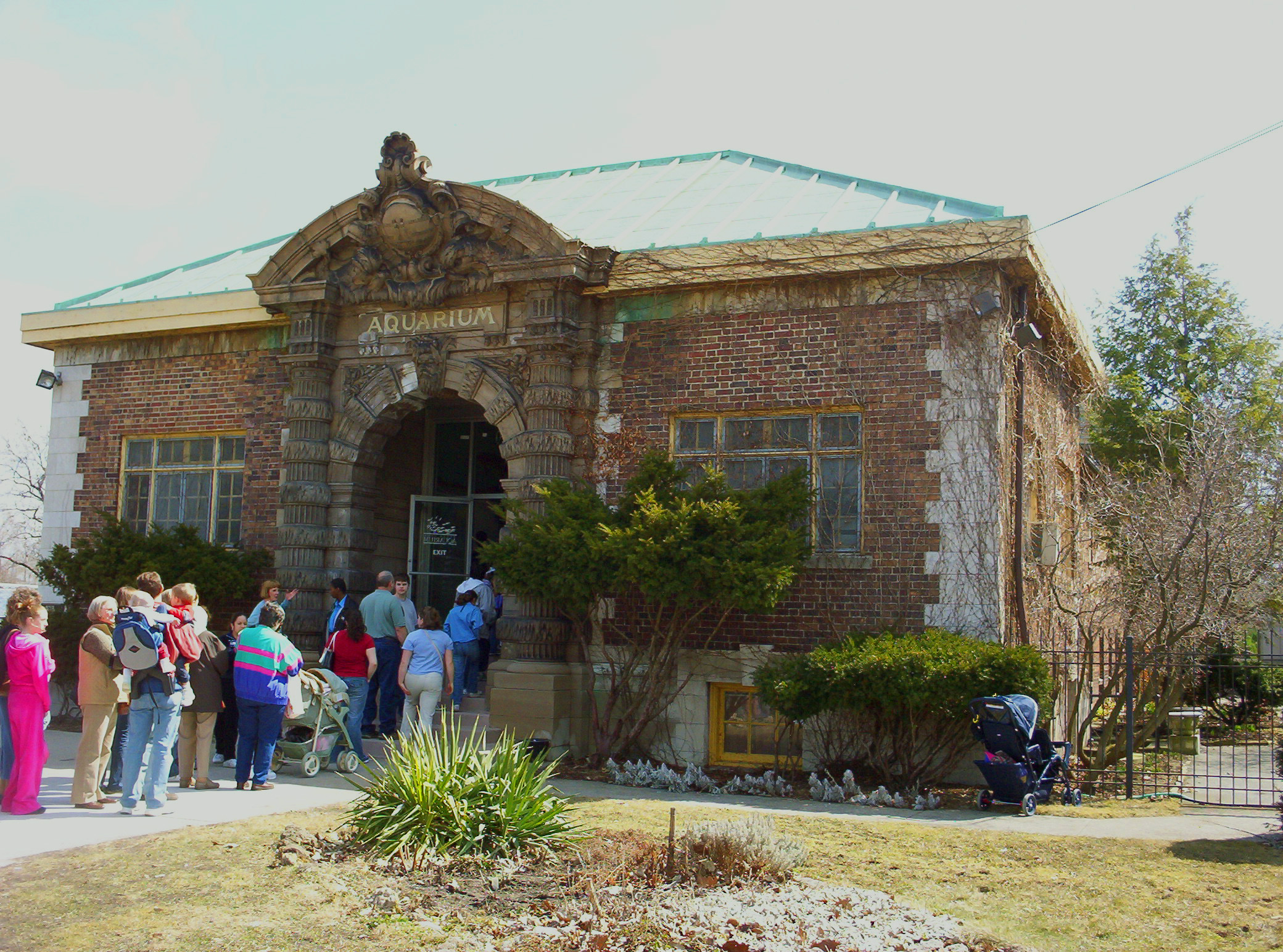
Exterior of the Belle Isle Aquarium

The Belle Isle Aquarium is a public aquarium located in Belle Isle Park. Designed by architect Albert Kahn, it opened on August 18, 1904, and was the oldest continually operating public aquarium in North America when it closed on April 3, 2005. The aquarium reopened to the public on August 18, 2012, and is now run by the Belle Isle Conservancy. The 10,000-square-foot (930 m2) historic building features a single large gallery with an arched ceiling covered in green glass tile to evoke an underwater feeling. The aquarium was operated by the Detroit Zoological Society prior to the 2005 closure.

=== Belle Isle Conservatory ===
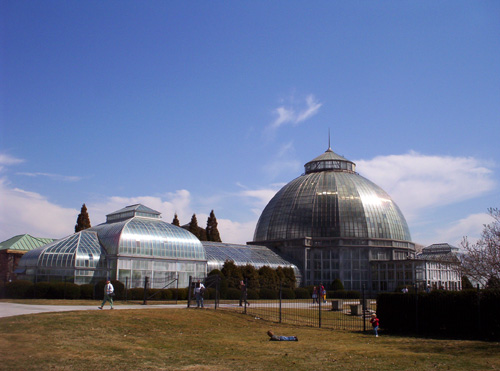
Whitcomb Conservatory on Detroit's Belle Isle

The Anna Scripps Whitcomb Conservatory, commonly and locally known as the Belle Isle Conservatory, is a greenhouse and botanical garden which opened in 1904.

The Belle Isle Conservatory was built in 1904, designed by architect Albert Kahn, and rebuilt 1952–1954 with aluminum replacing its original wooden beams. In 1953, it was named in honor of Anna Scripps Whitcomb, who left her 600-plant orchid collection to the city. Thanks to her gift and subsequent donations, the conservatory is now home to one of the largest municipally owned orchid collections in the United States. Rare orchids were saved from Great Britain during the World War II bombing and transported to the Anna Scripps Whitcomb Conservatory. Due to a lack of maintenance and budget cuts in recent years, the vast majority of orchids have now died.

The conservatory site contains formal perennial gardens, annual flower beds, a rose garden, and a koi lily pond. The conservatory itself covers more than an acre, features an imposing central dome 85 feet (26 m) high (with a total volume of 100,601 cubic feet), and is organized as a palm house in the dome, the north and south wings, and a show house. The south wing contains tropical plants of economic importance such as bananas, oranges, coffee, sugar cane, and orchids. The north wing hosts the extensive collections of ferns, cacti, and succulents. The show house, remodeled 1980–1981, features a continuous display of blooming plants. The conservatory underwent extensive renovations from 2019-2024. Restoration work included repairing and replacing steel trussing, reglazing the upper dome, and updating the conservatory's ventilation system.

=== Belle Isle Nature Center ===
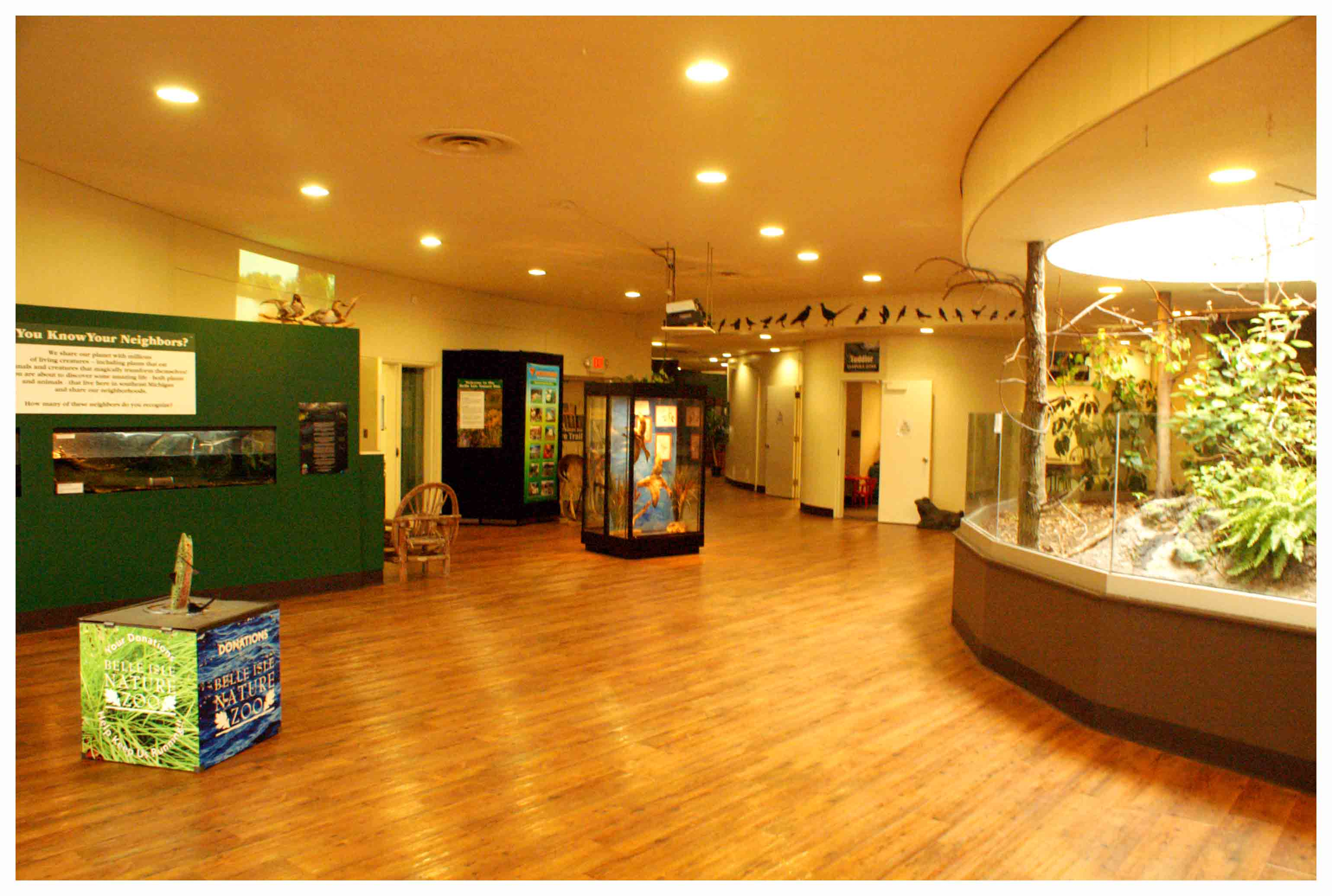
Interior of the Nature Center at Belle Isle

The Belle Isle Nature Center (BINC) is a nature center that encompasses approximately 4 acres (1.6 ha) of undisturbed forested wetland on Belle Isle. The nature center provides year-round educational, recreational and environmental conservation opportunities for the community.

A Deer Encounter, where fallow deer that once roamed the island can be fed by visitors, is part of a multi-phase project to convert the former Belle Isle Zoo into a nature center focusing on Michigan wildlife, flora and fauna. The BINC also includes a renovated auditorium, a turtle exhibit featuring native Michigan turtles, an indoor beehive allowing year-round viewing of bee behavior, a spider exhibit, and a Creation Station for children's educational programming.

=== Dossin Great Lakes Museum ===
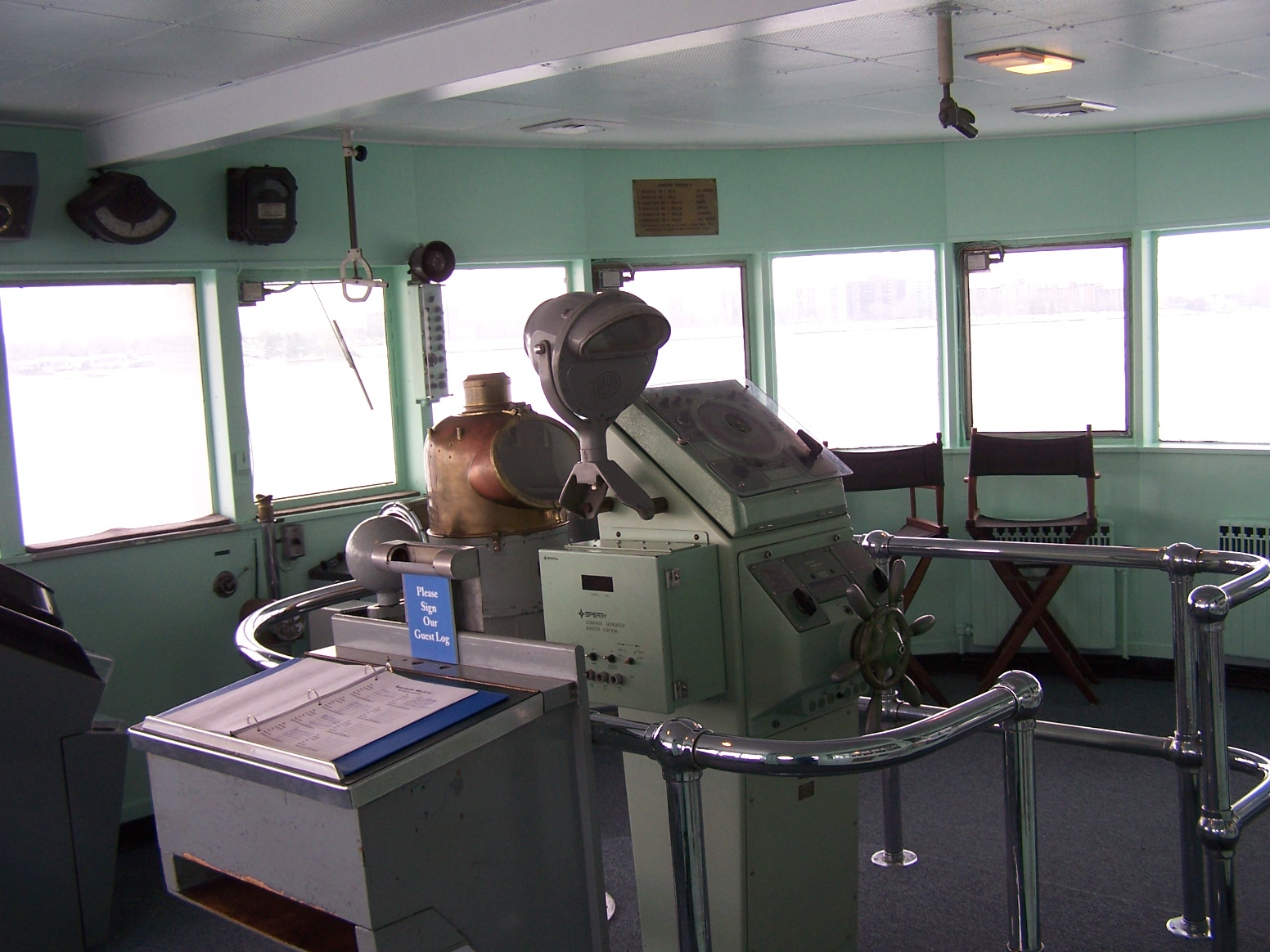
Interior of SS William Clay Ford Pilot House

The Dossin Great Lakes Museum is a maritime museum. Located on The Strand on Belle Isle Park, this museum places special interest on Detroit's role on national and regional maritime history. The 16,000-square-foot (1,500 m^{2}) museum features exhibits such as one of the largest collection of model ships in the world, and the bow anchor of the legendary SS Edmund Fitzgerald.

=== Giant slide ===
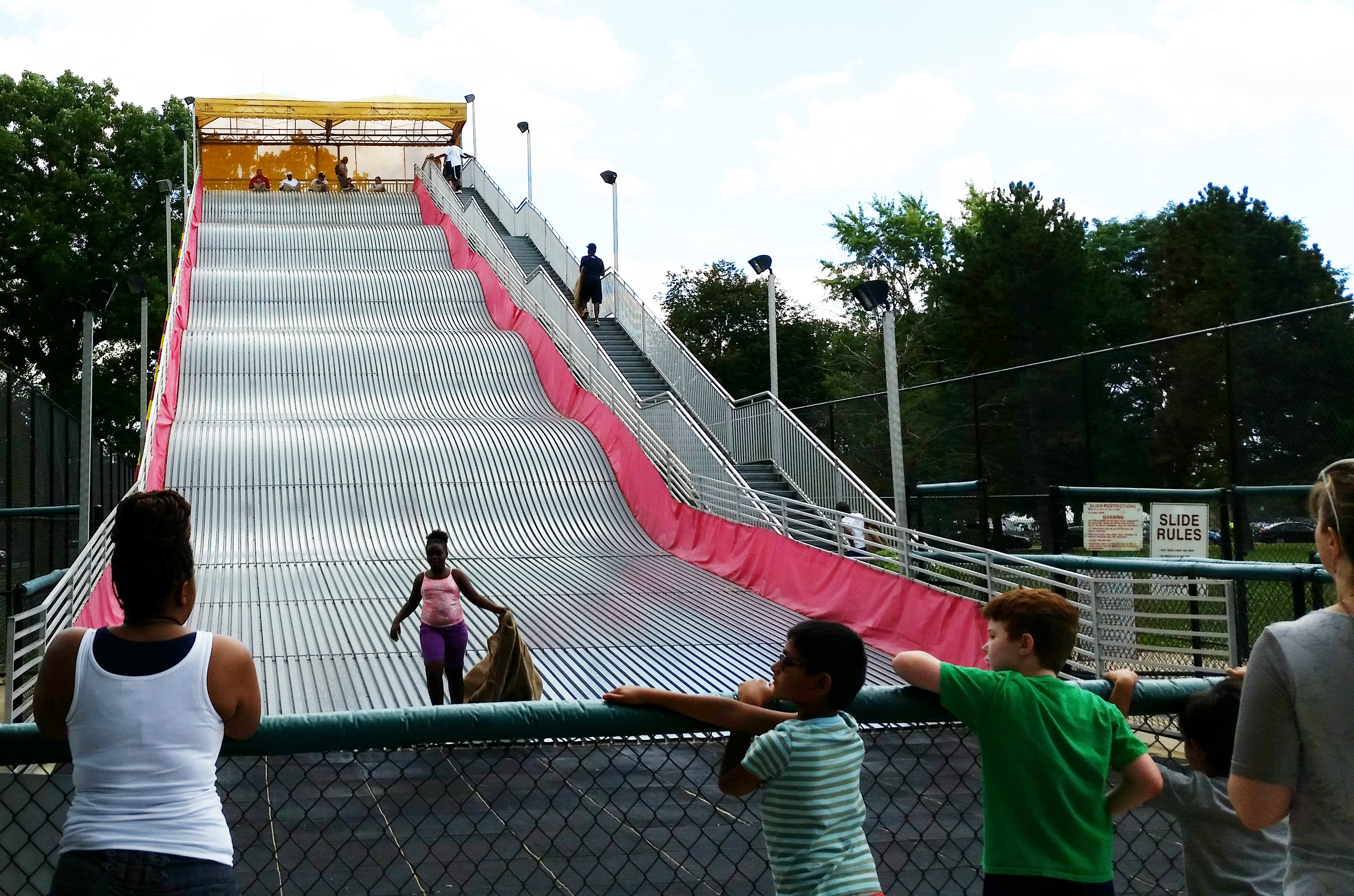
Belle Isle Park slide in 2015

A large playground slide was opened in the park in 1967. The slide was closed for two years during the COVID-19 pandemic, and upon reopening experienced issues with the speed at which riders were descending, which was attributed to the fact it had been freshly waxed. The slide's issues were satirized by Detroit-based comedy rapper Gmac Cash in an August 2022 song titled "Giant Slide."

== Statistics ==
At 982 acres (1.534 sq mi; 397 ha), Belle Isle Park was the largest city island park (prior to its transfer to the State of Michigan as a state park) and is larger than Central Park in New York City, also designed by Olmsted.

Detroit's River Rouge Park is 1,172 acres (1.831 sq mi; 474 ha). Prior to Belle Isle becoming a state park, the city's Parks and Recreation Department managed 6,000 acres (9.4 sq mi; 2,400 ha) of parks (now approximately 5,000 acres (7.8 sq mi; 2,000 ha)). The Huron-Clinton Metroparks authority manages 24,000 acres (38 sq mi; 9,700 ha) of parks and beaches; however, this does not include all parks in the area. There are thousands of additional acres of parks in metropolitan Detroit.

== Gallery ==
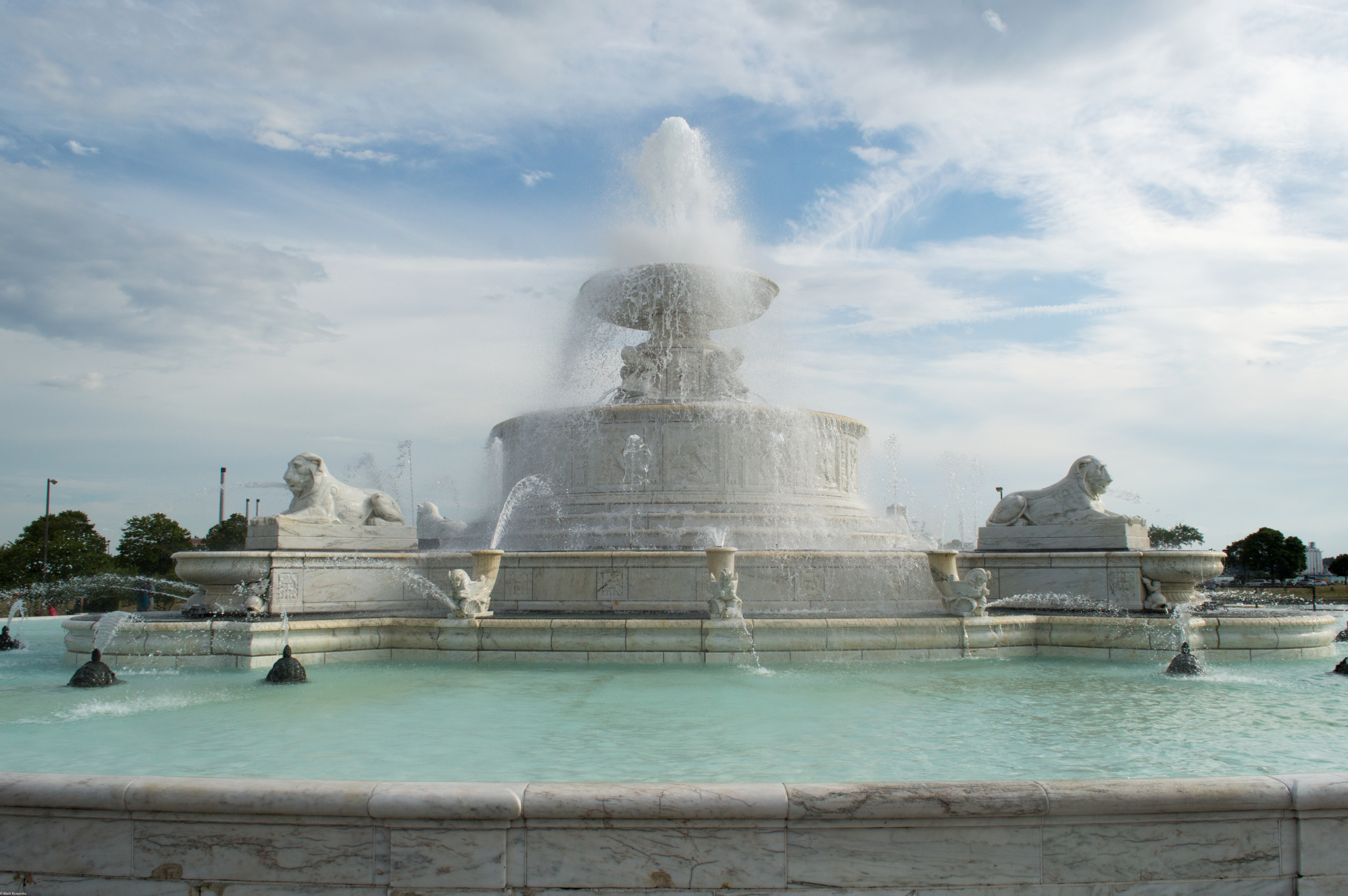
James Scott Memorial Fountain

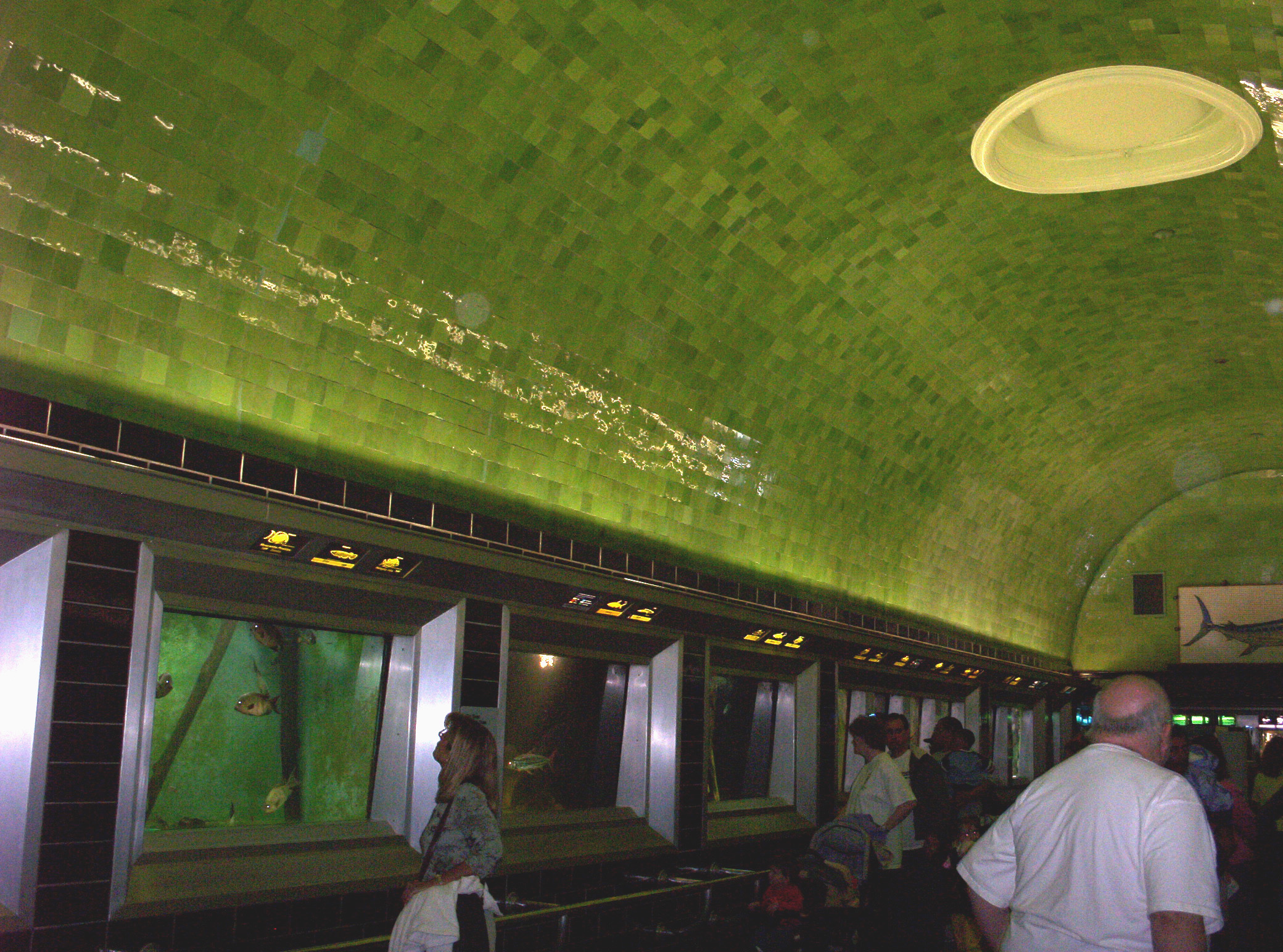
Interior of the Belle Isle Aquarium, with its single green-tile curved ceiling gallery

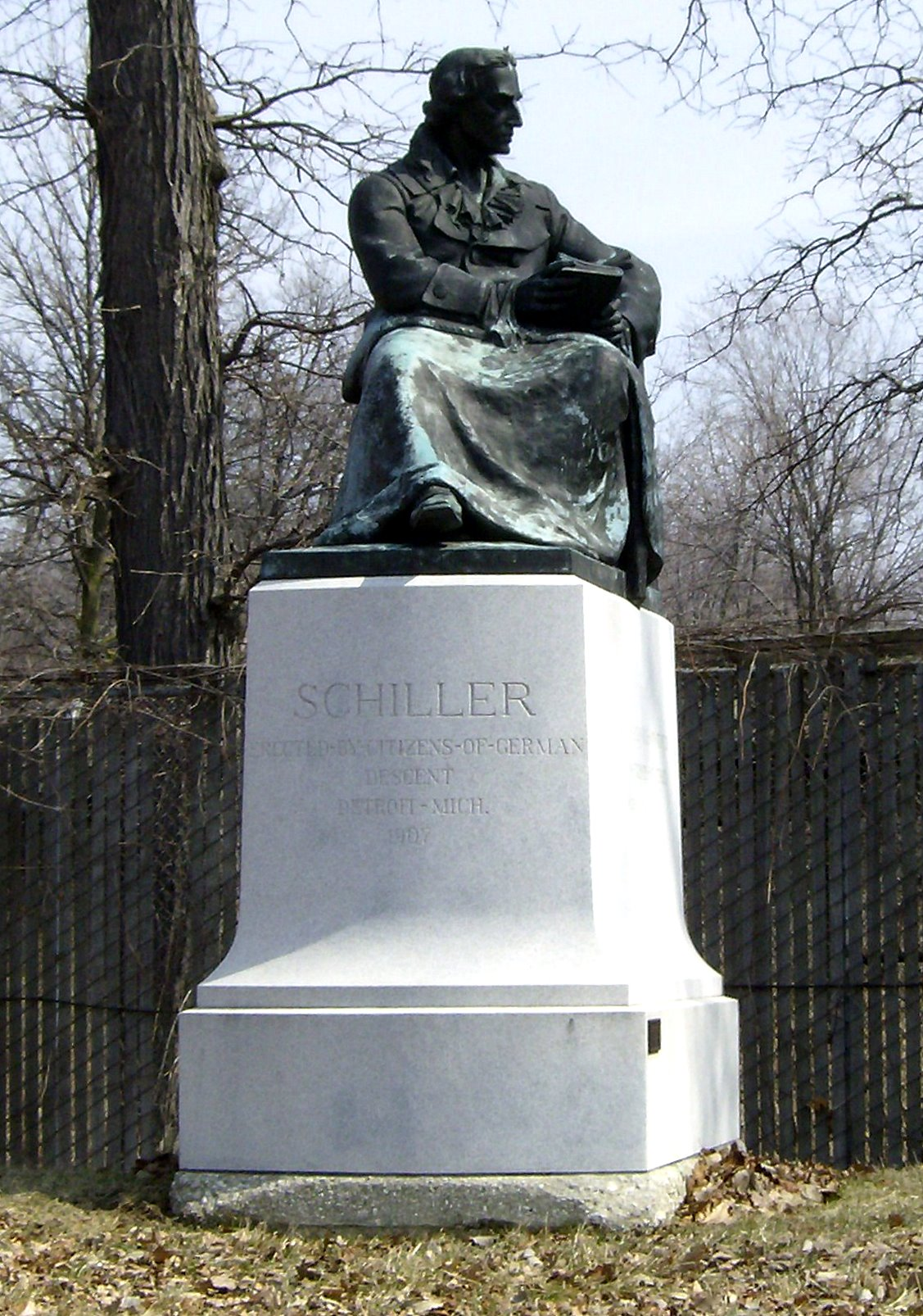
Friedrich Schiller, the German poet, philosopher, historian, and dramatist, statue on Belle Isle

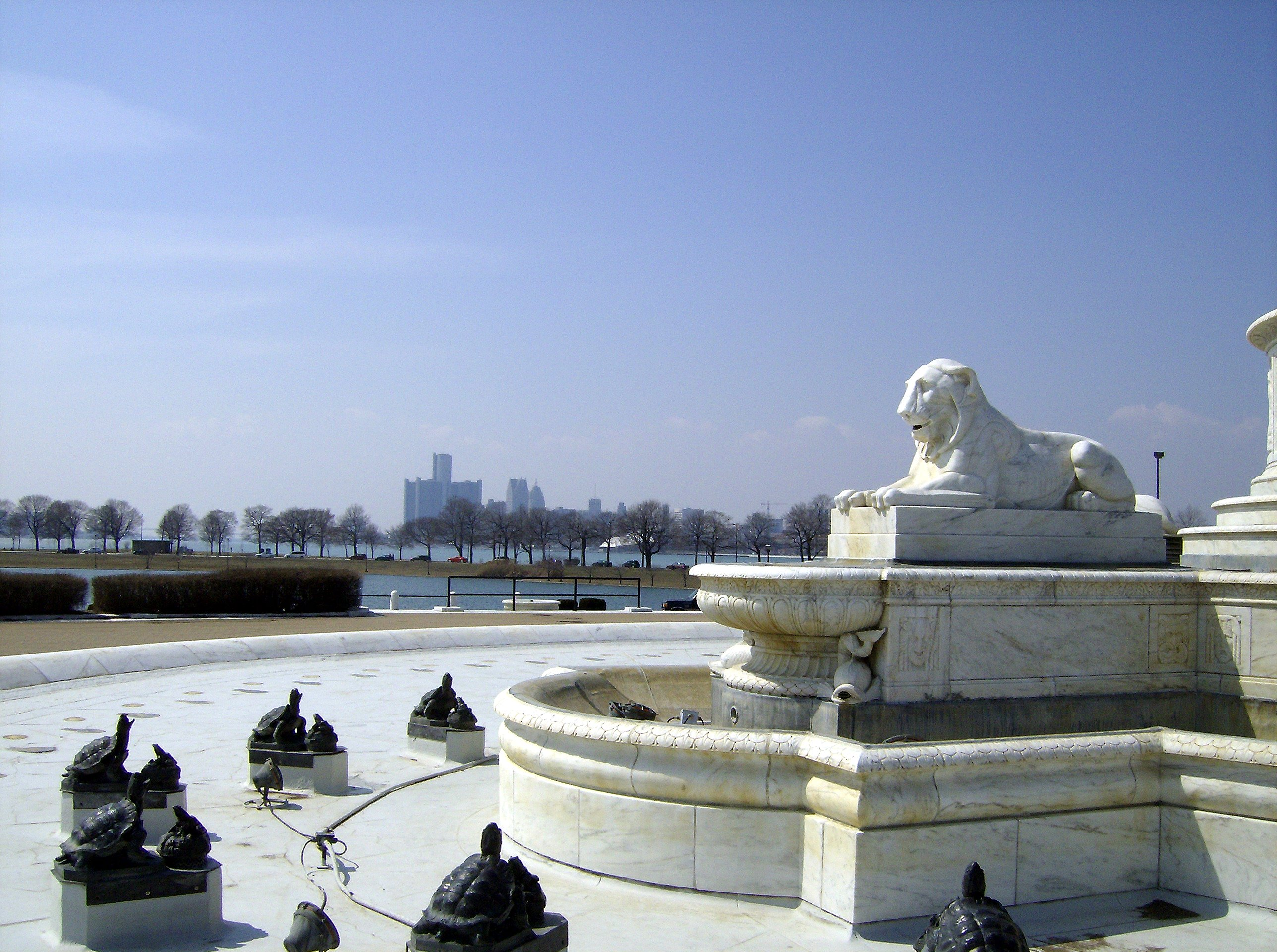
View of Downtown Detroit from Belle Isle

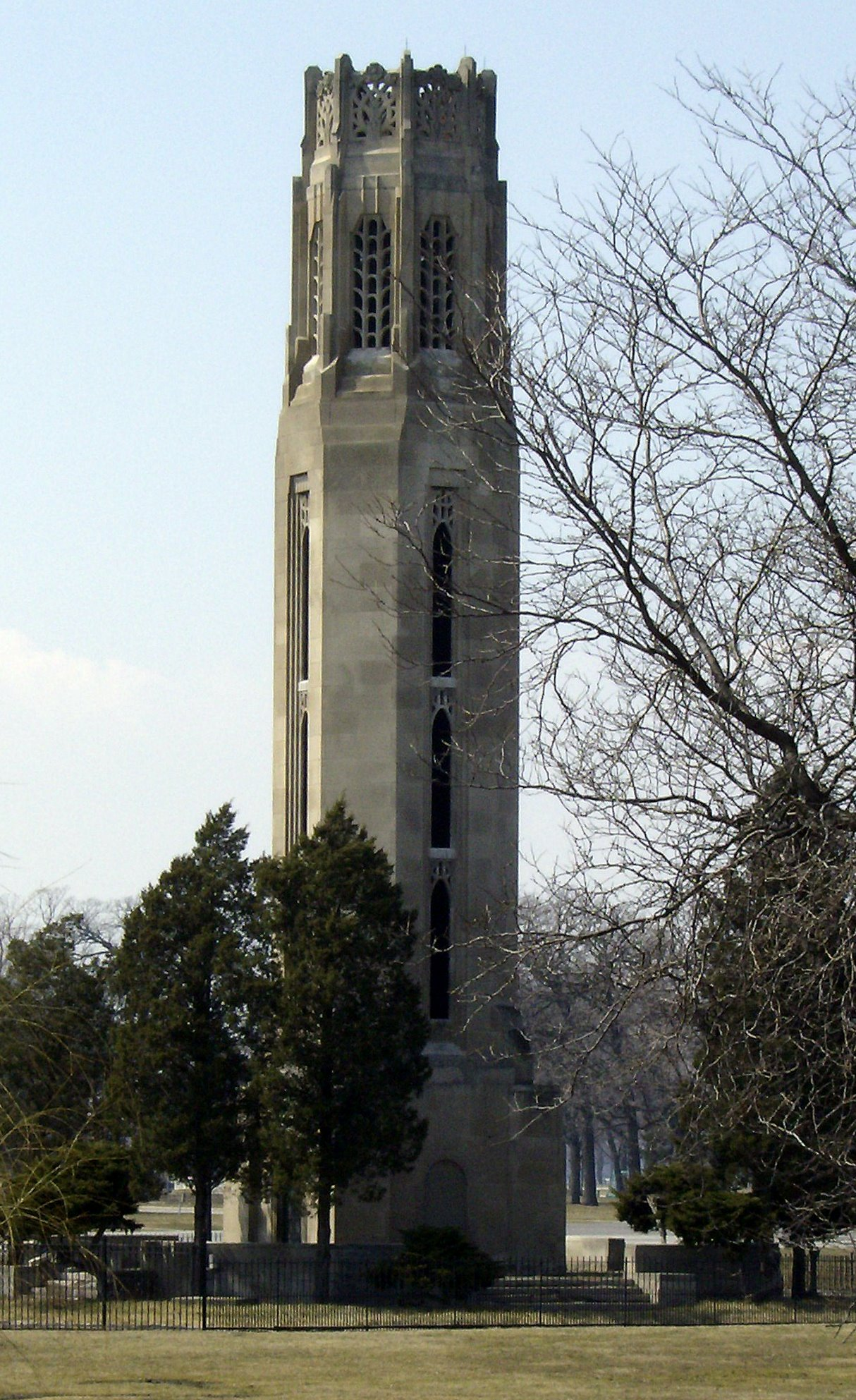
Nancy Brown Peace Carillon Clock on Belle Isle

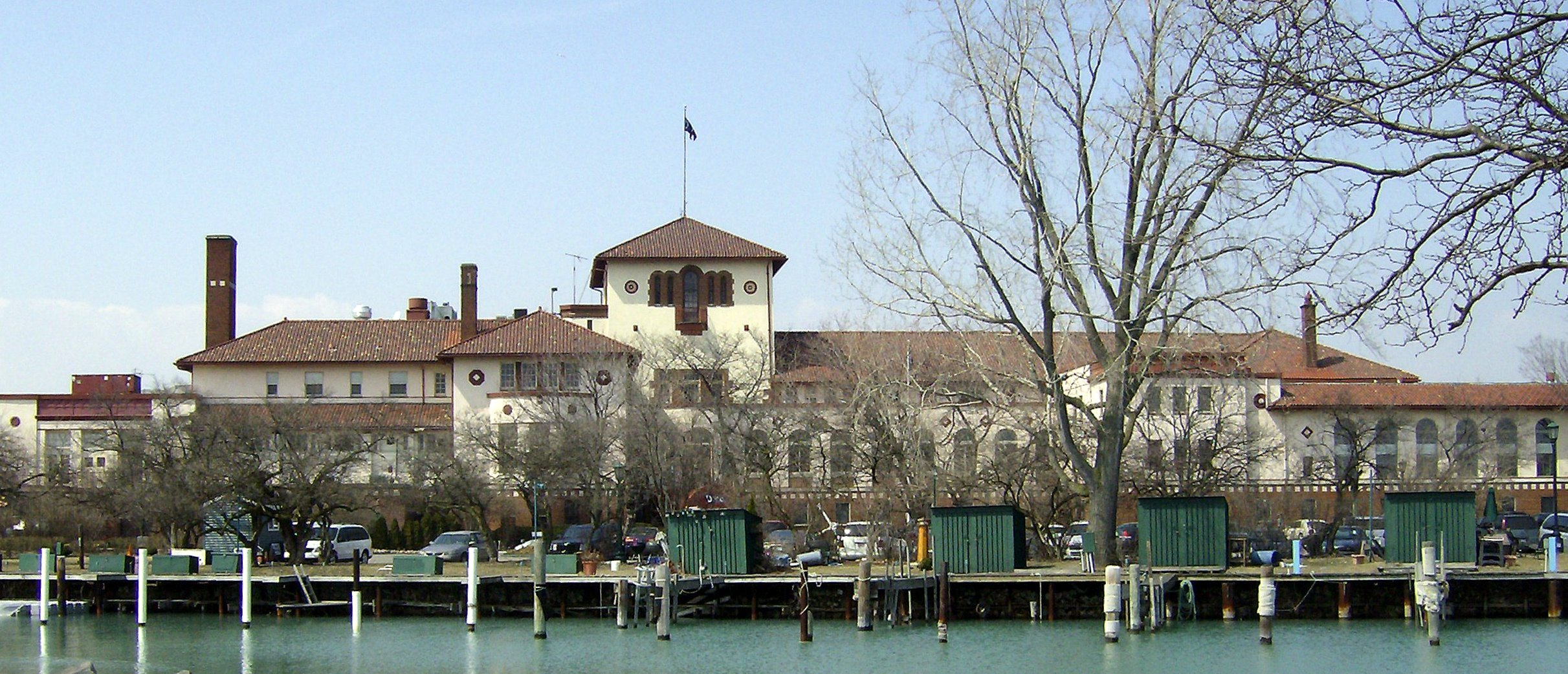
Detroit Yacht Club in Belle Isle Park

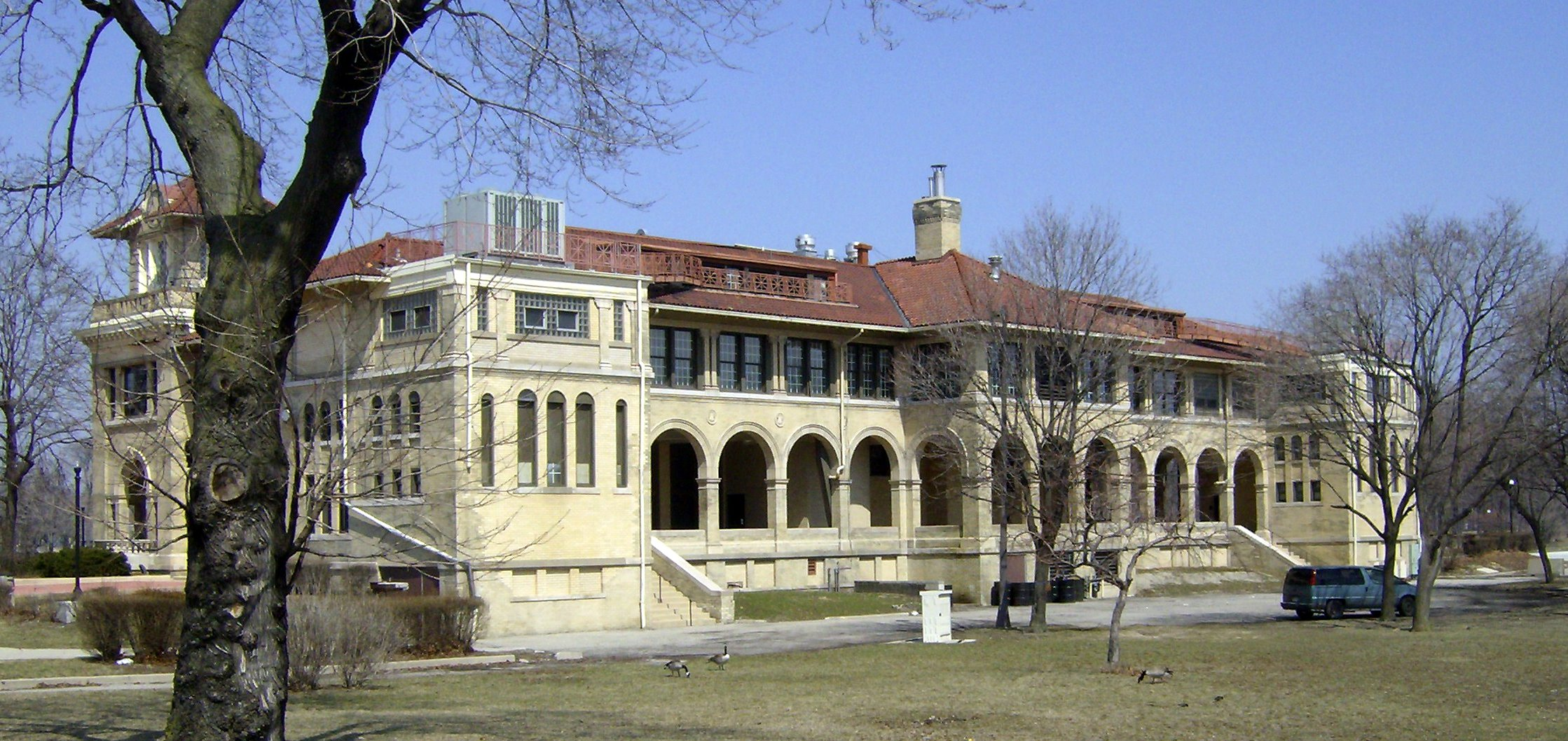
Belle Isle Casino

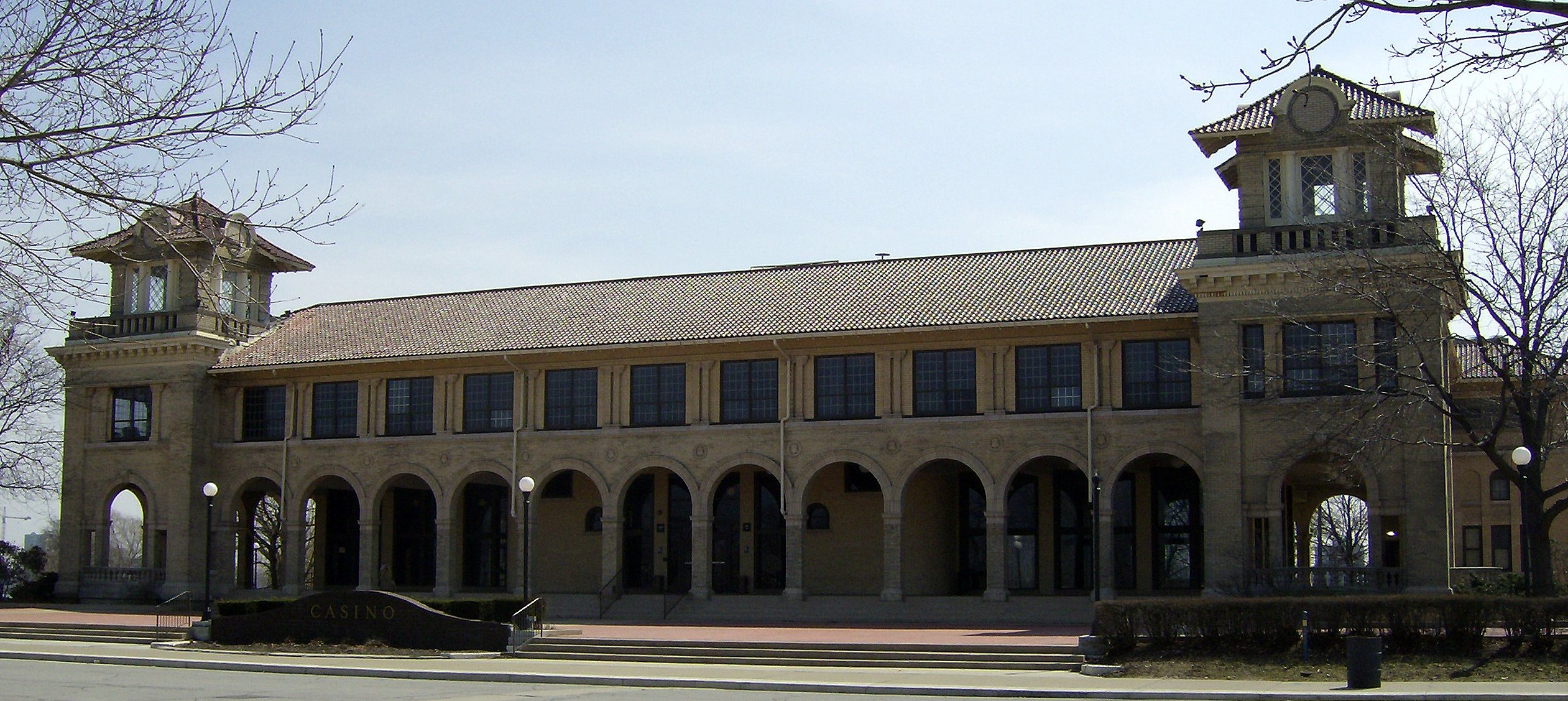
Front of casino off Fountain Circle

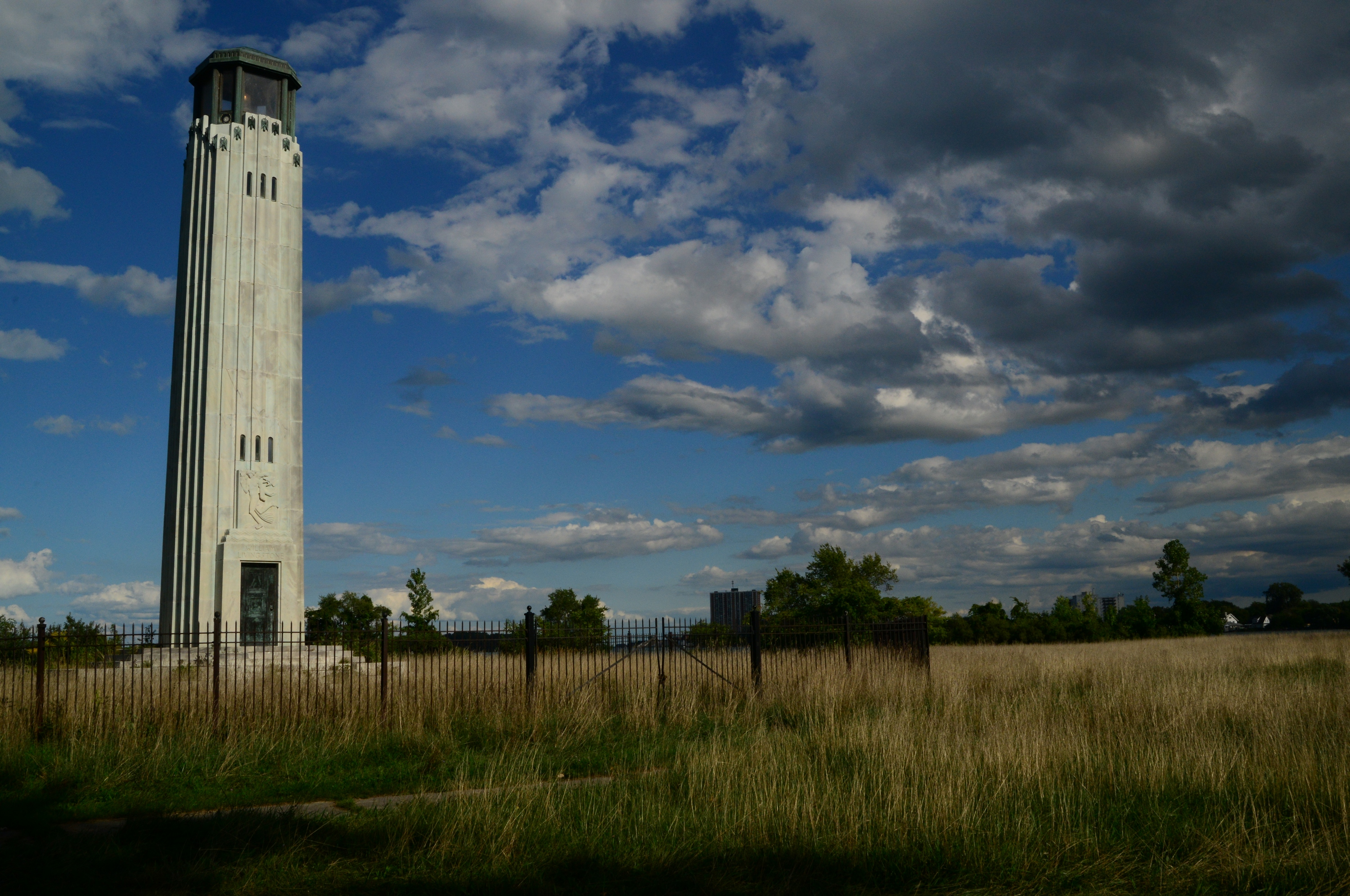
William Livingstone Lighthouse

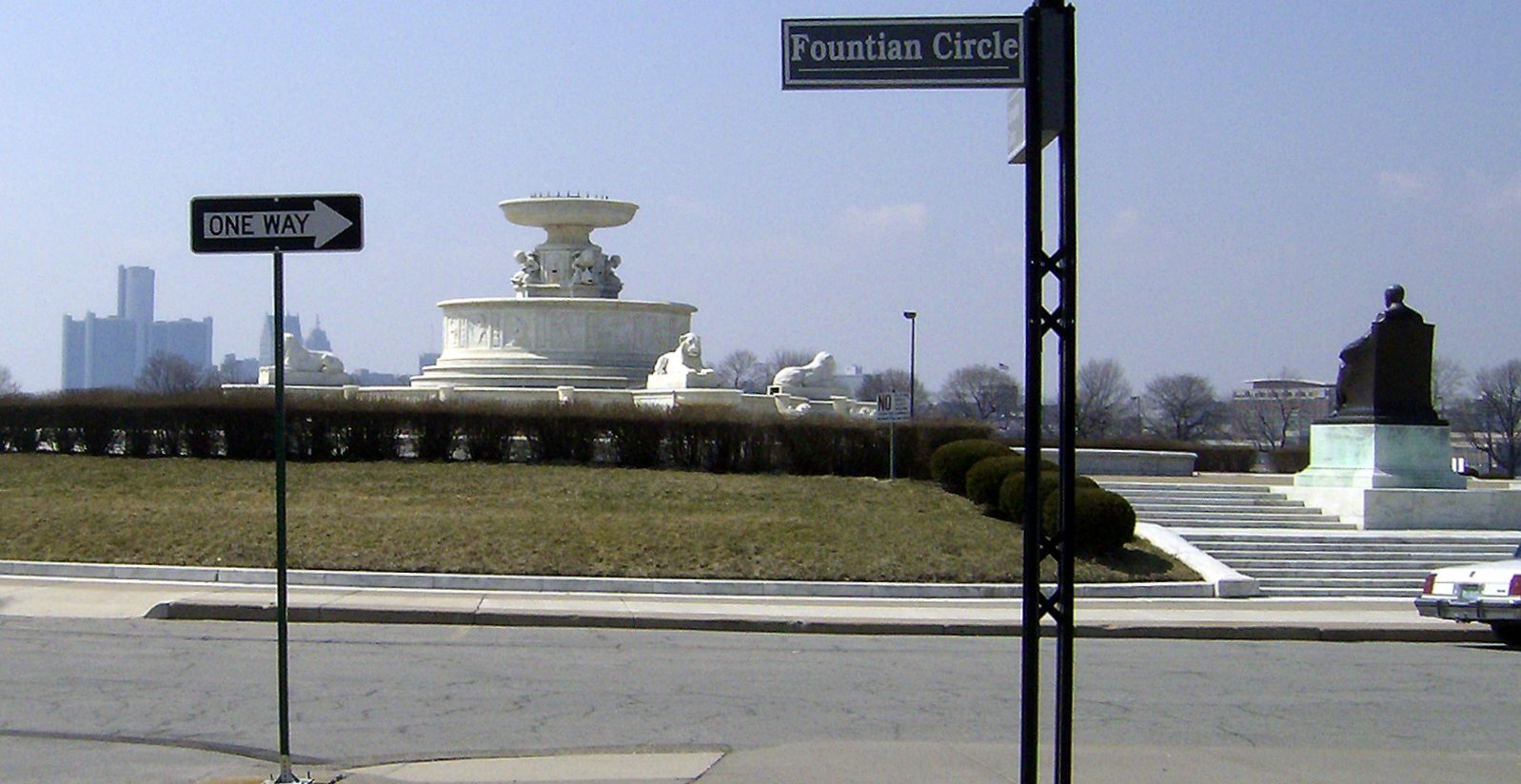
James Scott statue admires the fountain

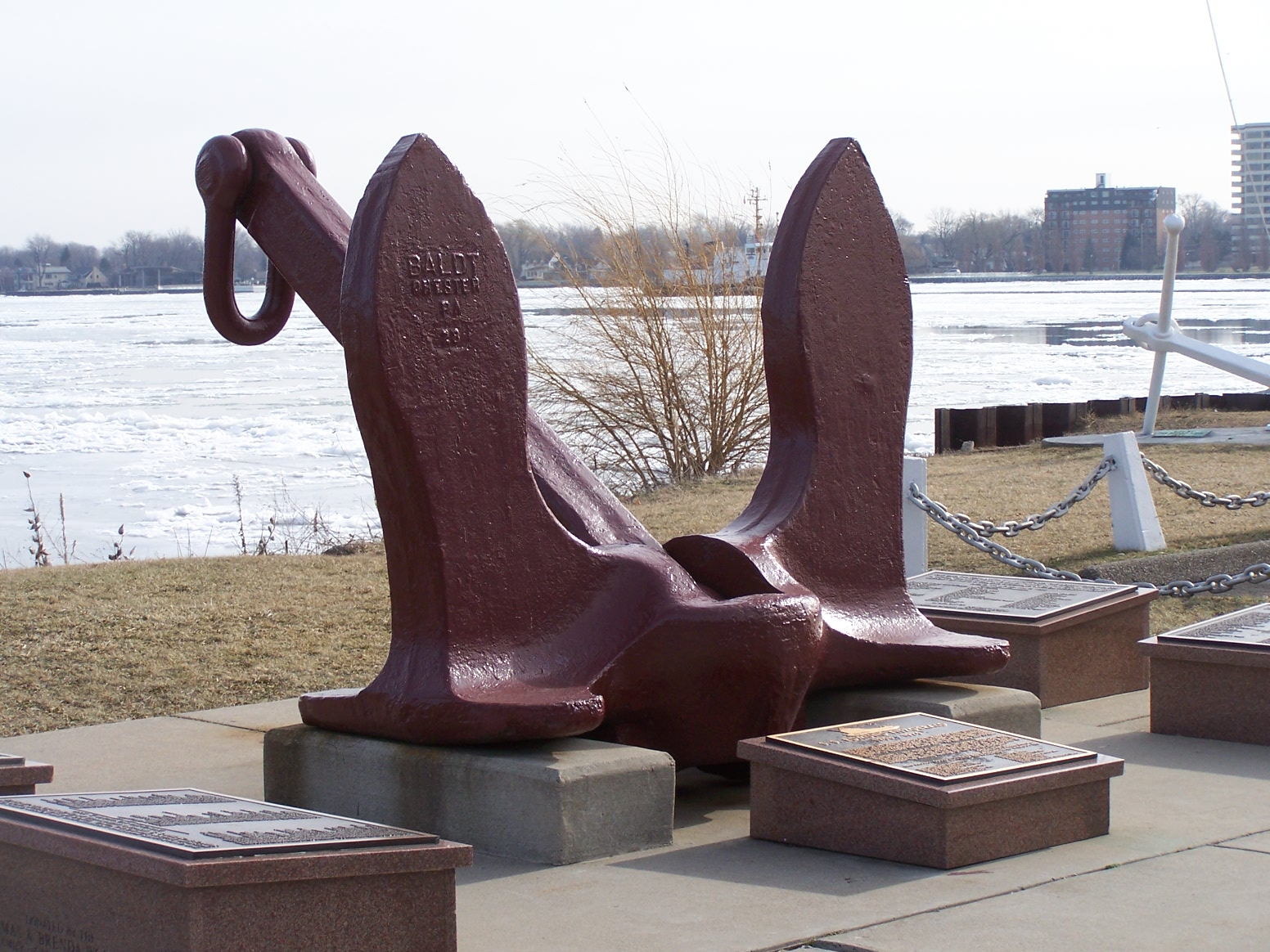
SS Edmund Fitzgerald bow anchor

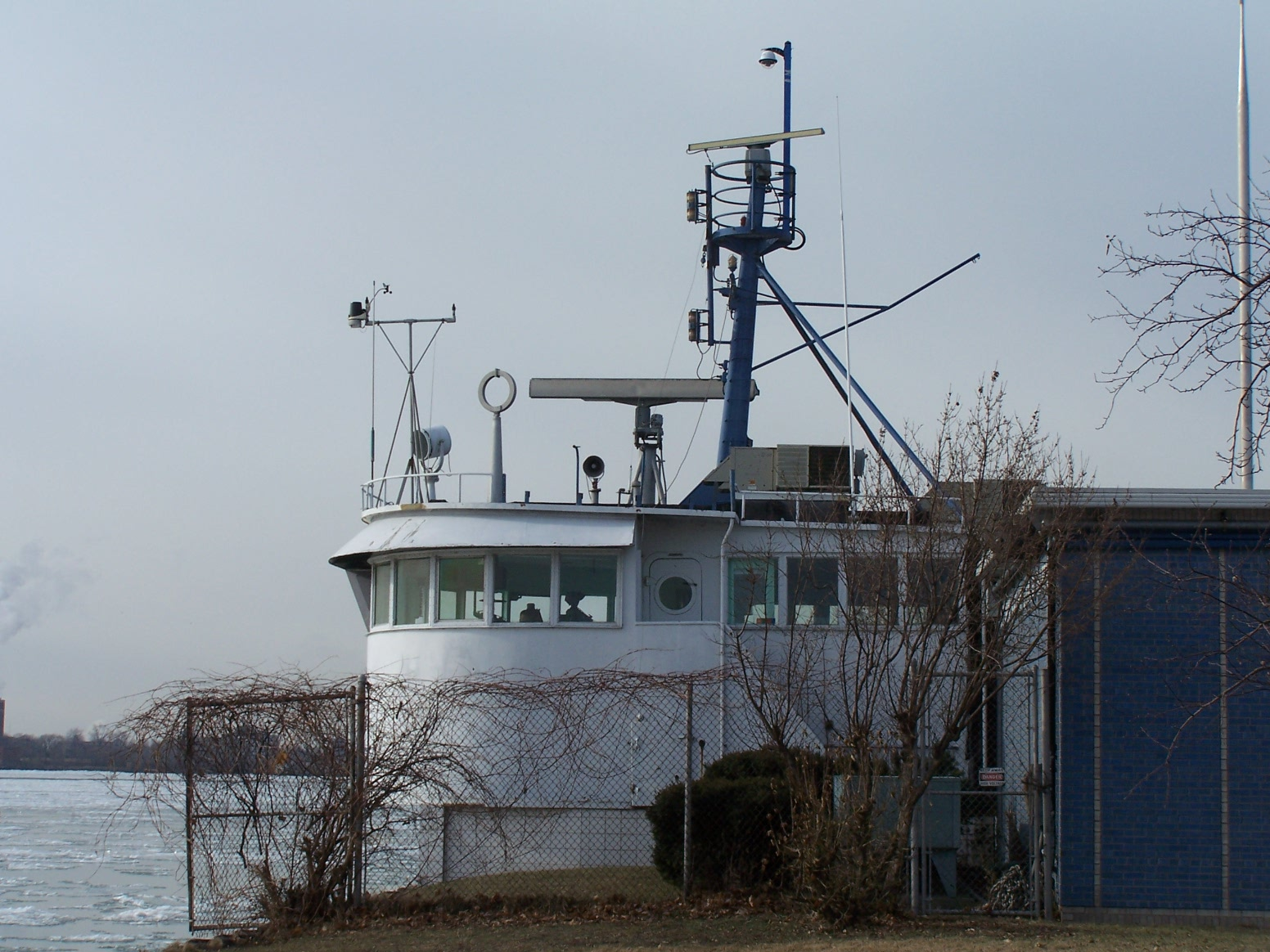
Exterior of SS William Clay Ford Pilot House

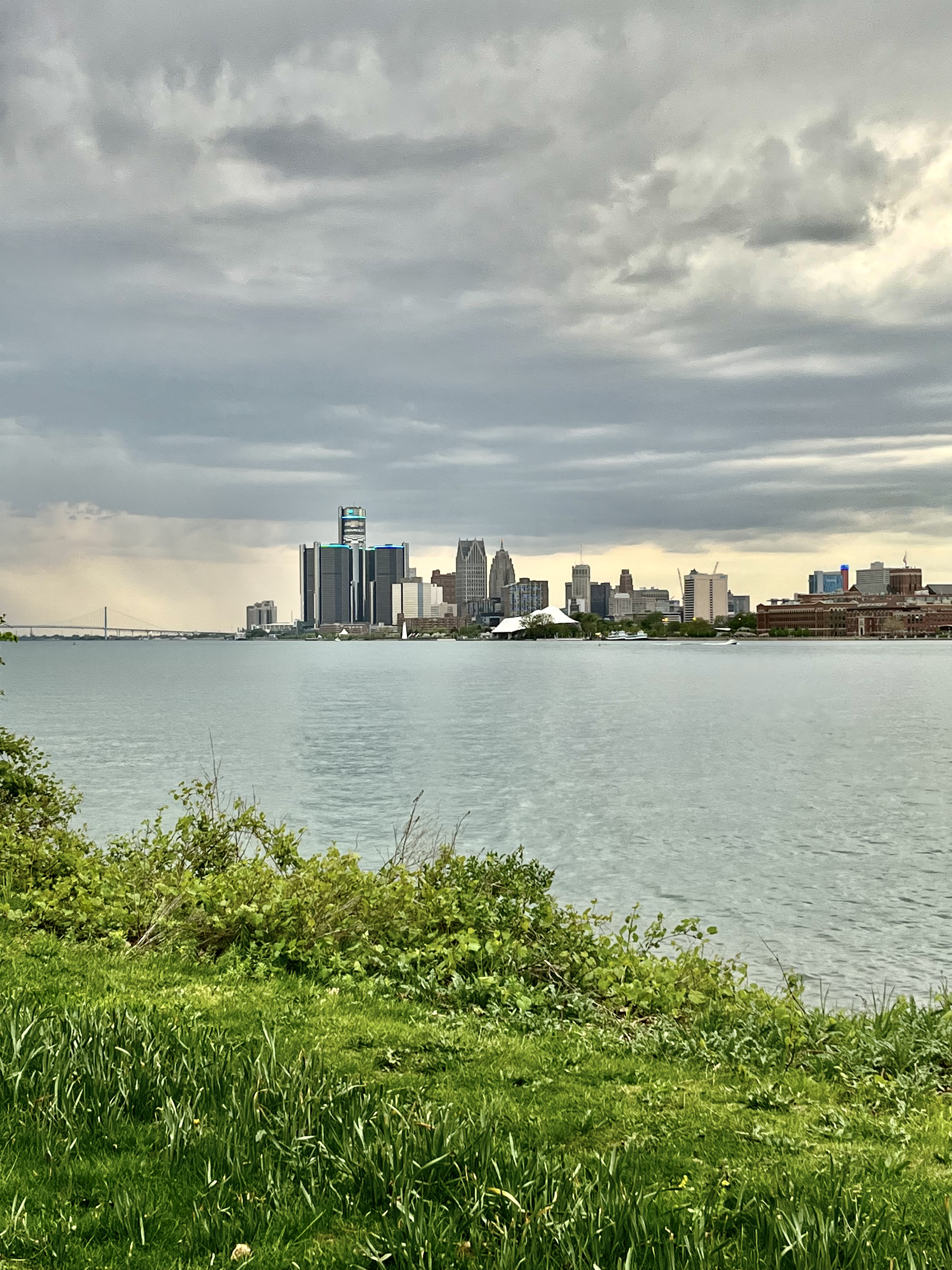
A view of downtown Detroit from Belle Isle in 2022

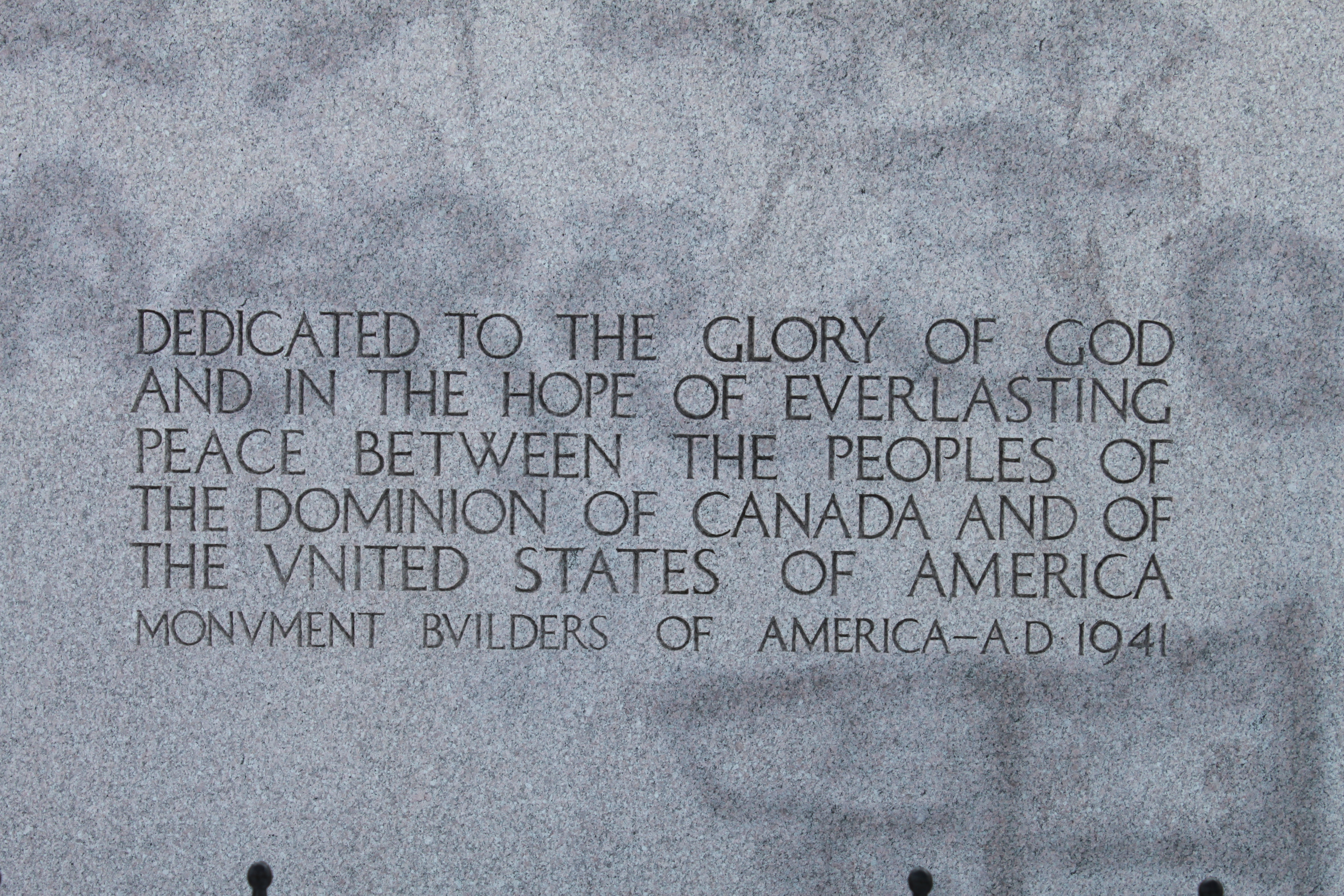
Inscription in front of the Nancy Brown Peace Tower

== See also ==
- Architecture of metropolitan Detroit
- Belle Isle Aquarium – Aquarium in Detroit
- Coast Guard Station Belle Isle – US Coast Guard station in Michigan
- Cycling in Detroit
- Detroit Boat Club – Rowing club in Detroit, USA
- Detroit International Riverfront – Area of Detroit, Michigan that borders the Detroit River
- Detroit Race Riot (1943) – Took place on Belle Isle
- Detroit River – River connecting Lake Huron with Lake Erie
- Detroit Yacht Club
- List of botanical gardens in the United States
- List of maritime museums in the United States
- Tourism in metropolitan Detroit
