= Light mast =

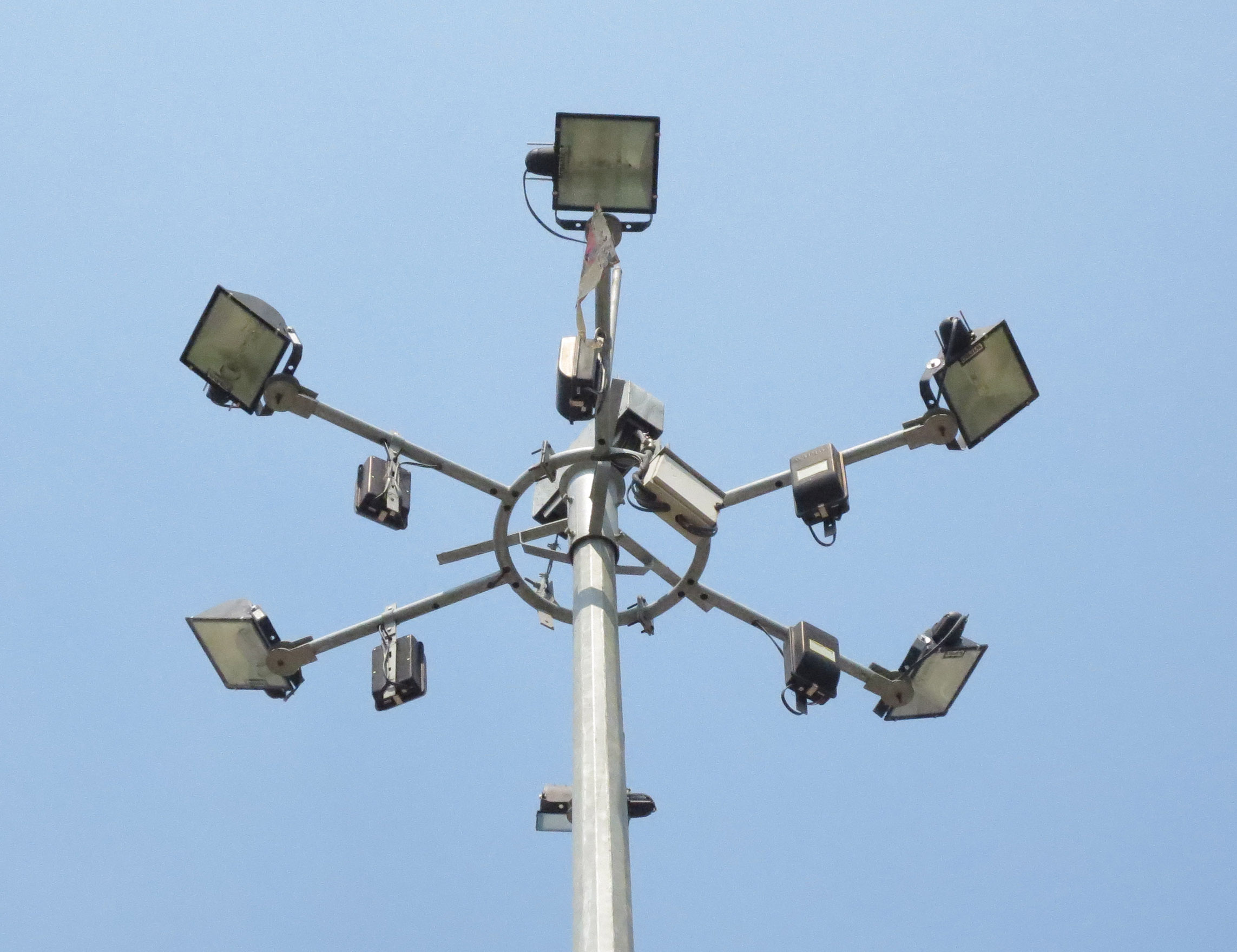
Light mast without lamps

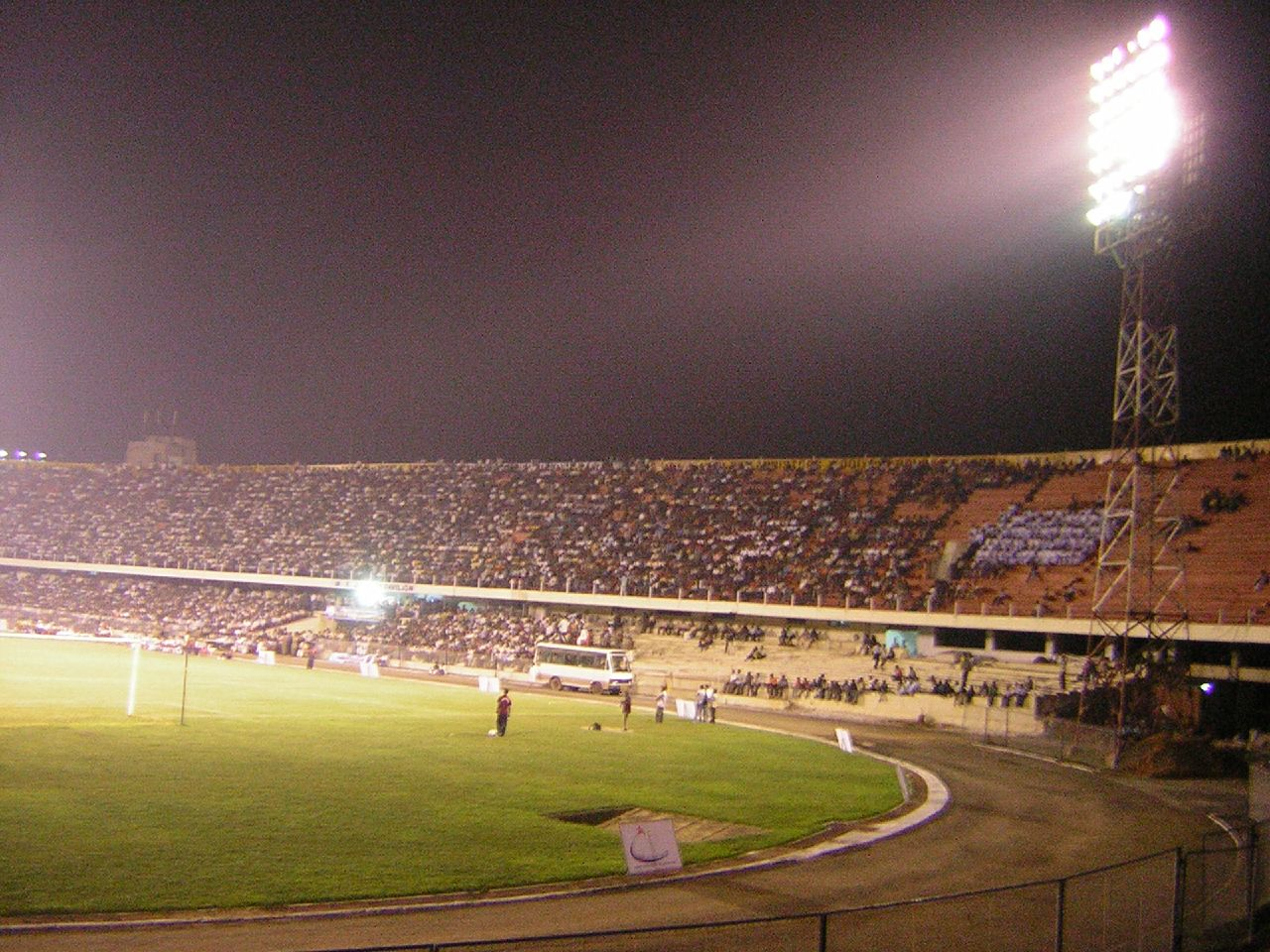
Light mast at stadium

Light mast is a tall lighting specified mast, which has several big searchlights on top of it. Light masts illuminates large areas and are possible to move, which is why they are used (for example) as farming, construction and emergency works implement. The device works with its own electric generator or with external power source.

== See also ==
- Flag mast
- Radio mast
- Cell mast
