= Tourism in metropolitan Detroit =

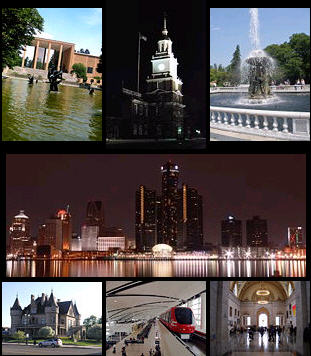
Left to right: Cranbrook Art Museum in Bloomfield Hills, The Henry Ford in Dearborn, the Detroit Zoo in Royal Oak, the International Riverfront, Hecker House in Midtown, Metro Airport, and the Detroit Institute of Arts in Midtown

Tourism in metropolitan Detroit, Michigan is a significant factor for the region's culture and for its economy, comprising nine percent of the area's two million jobs. About 19 million people visit Metro Detroit spending an estimated 6 billion in 2019. In 2009, this number was about 15.9 million people, spending an estimated $4.8 billion. Detroit is one of the largest American cities and metropolitan regions to offer casino resort hotels. Leading multi-day events throughout Metro Detroit draw crowds of hundreds of thousands to over three million people. More than fifteen million people cross the highly traveled nexus of the Ambassador Bridge and the Detroit-Windsor Tunnel annually. Detroit is at the center of an emerging Great Lakes Megalopolis. An estimated 46 million people live within a 300-mile (480 km) radius of Metro Detroit.

Detroit's unique culture, distinctive architecture, and revitalization and urban renewal efforts in the 21st century have given Detroit increased prominence as a tourist destination in recent years. The New York Times listed Detroit in its list of 52 Places to Go in 2017, while travel guide publisher Lonely Planet named Detroit the second-best city in the world to visit in 2018. In 2022, Detroit was featured in Time's The World's Greatest Places list.

Visit Detroit is the region's official destination marketing organization, promoting the Detroit metro region (Oakland, Wayne, and Macomb counties) regionally, nationally and internationally as a convention, business meeting, and tourism destination. The organization, originally called the Detroit Convention and Businessman's League and later changed to the Detroit Metro Convention and Visitors Bureau, was founded on February 19, 1896 by Milton J. Carmichael and is the world's first convention and visitors bureau.

== Market overview ==
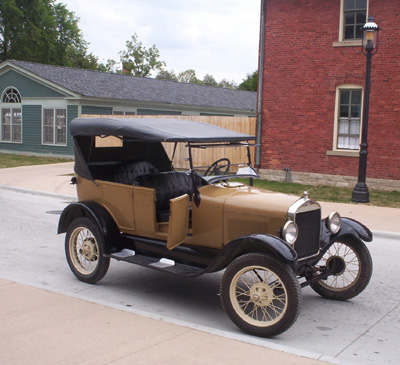
Tourists can ride in a Model T in Greenfield Village at The Henry Ford, a National Historic Landmark.

The metropolitan region's tourism industry depends on drawing large crowds with quality attractions and entertainment in order to positively impact the local economy. As the world's traditional automotive center, the city hosts the annual North American International Auto Show in January, a multi-day event. Other major multi-day events that reflect the region's culture such as the Motown Winter Blast and the Windsor–Detroit International Freedom Festival, typically held the last week of June, can draw super sized-crowds of hundreds of thousands to over three million people. A 2007 poll, conducted by Selzer and Co., reported that about two-thirds of the millions of residents in the suburban area occasionally dine and attend cultural events or take in professional games in the city of Detroit. In 2006, the four-day Motown Winter Blast drew a cold weather crowd of about 1.2 million people to Campus Martius Park area downtown. Metro Detroit is one of thirteen U.S. cities with teams from four major sports. Besides its casino resort hotels, the region's leading attraction is The Henry Ford, America's largest indoor-outdoor museum complex, a National Historic Landmark museum entertainment complex with an IMAX theater next to the Automotive Hall of Fame in Dearborn. The Detroit Institute of Arts in the cultural center downtown is another leading attraction and national historic site. The Detroit Festival of the Arts in Midtown draws about 350,000 people. The Detroit Zoo in Royal Oak has an Arctic Ring of Wildlife exhibit with an underwater viewing tunnel that includes the largest polar bear exhibit in the U.S. Together, The Henry Ford, the Detroit Institute of Arts, and the Zoo attract about 2,500,000 visitors annually. Detroit is also home to the Ford Piquette Avenue Plant. Built in 1904 and now running as a museum, it is the oldest car factory building in the world open to the public and was the birthplace of the Ford Model T.

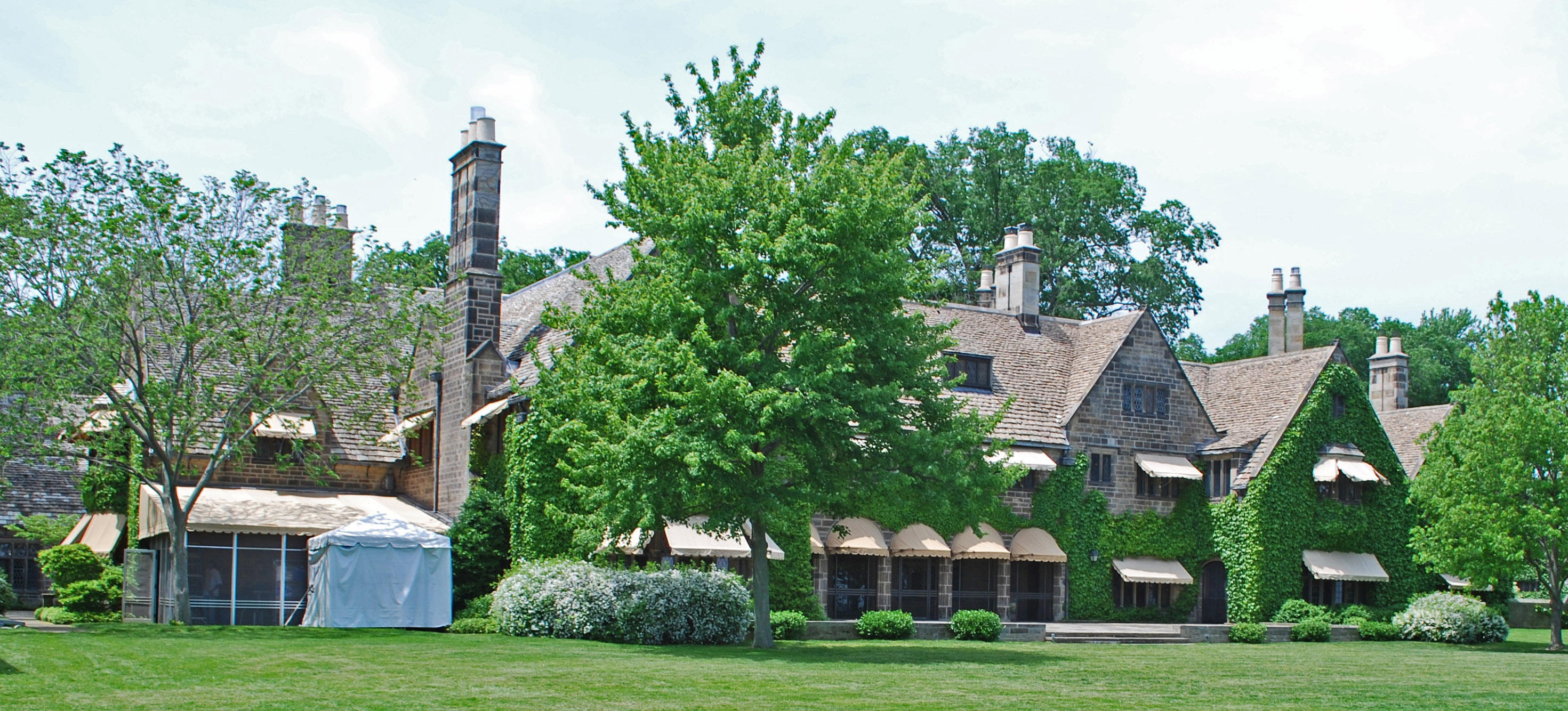
The historic Edsel and Eleanor Ford House on Lake St. Clair in Grosse Pointe is open to the public for guided tours.

An estimated one million spectators attended the 2009 Woodward Dream Cruise held annually in August. Another automotive attraction cataloging the history of the industry is the Chrysler Museum in Auburn Hills. The mansions of the auto barons that are open to the public for guided tours include the Dodge-Wilson estate Meadow Brook Hall in Rochester Hills, Edsel and Eleanor Ford House in Grosse Pointe, Henry Ford's Fair Lane Estate in Dearborn, and the Lawrence Fisher Mansion in Detroit. Cranbrook House and Gardens in Bloomfield Hills, the estate of publisher George Gough Booth, is also open to the public for guided tours. The New York Times listed Detroit among its 53 world travel destinations for 2008 and again in 2017.

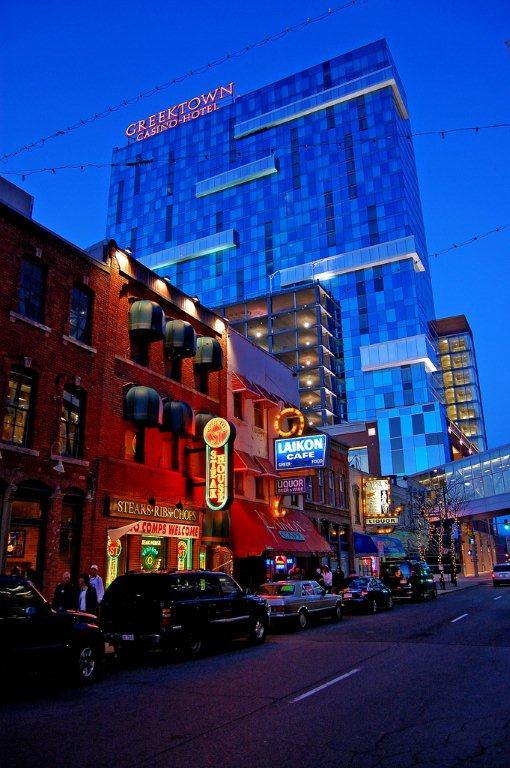
Greektown Casino Hotel overlooks Greektown Historic District in Detroit

Detroit's Greektown is a busy entertainment district. The city is a center for the major casino resort hotels - MGM Grand Detroit, MotorCity Casino, Hollywood Casino, and Caesars Windsor just across the river in Canada - which support an active nightlife. The metropolitan region's potential to attract super-sized crowds should not be underestimated. Just across the river, Caesars Windsor attracts about six million visitors annually. Detroit is one of the largest American cities and metropolitan regions to offer casino resort hotels. The Detroit International Riverfront hosts an events including the Windsor-Detroit International Freedom Festival in late June with one of the nation's largest displays of fireworks and the Electronic Music Festival on Memorial Day weekend. More than fifteen million people cross the Ambassador Bridge and the Detroit-Windsor Tunnel annually. Detroit is at the center of an emerging Great Lakes Megalopolis. An estimated 46 million people live within a 300-mile (480 km) radius of Metro Detroit. High-speed rail proposals between Chicago and Detroit and for the Quebec City – Windsor Corridor would further increase access to Metro Detroit. The U.S. Department of Transportation has awarded $244 M in grants for high-speed rail upgrades between Chicago and Detroit. The 710-mile (1,140 km) Quebec City – Windsor Corridor contains over 18 million people, with 51% of the Canadian population and three out of the four largest metropolitan areas in Canada, according to the 2001 Census. Movie studios in the metro area help establish the state as a legitimate contender in the 12-month-a-year film business. Motown Motion Picture Studios (2009) with 535,000 square feet (49,700 m^{2}) will produce movies at the Pontiac Centerpoint Business Campus for a film industry expected to employ over 4,000 people in the metro area.

=== Cruise ships, hotels, and resorts ===
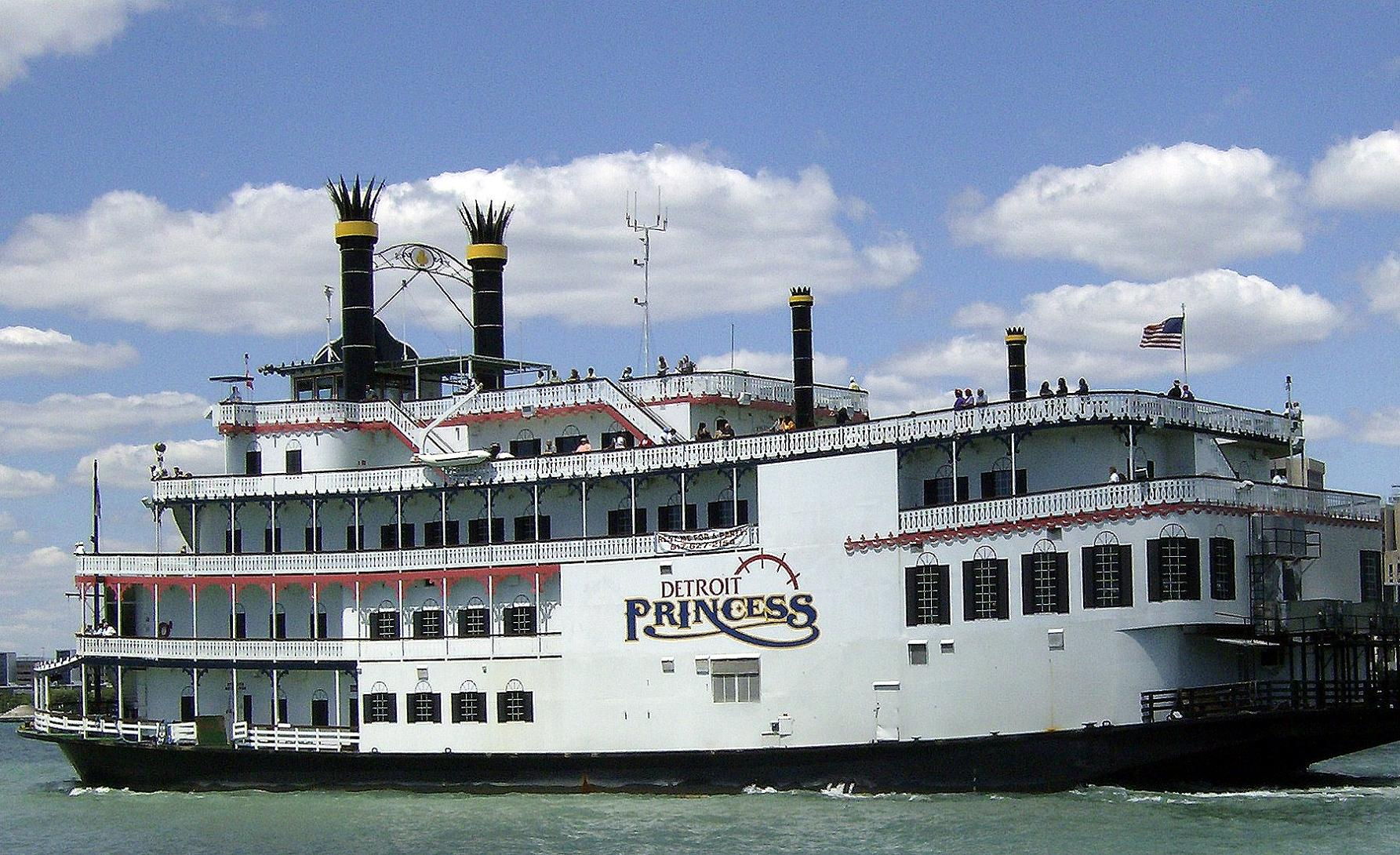
Detroit Princess Riverboat charter hosts regularly scheduled public cruises.

The Passenger Terminal and Dock of Detroit on Hart Plaza near the Renaissance Center receives cruise ships and tall ships. Cruise liners include vessels marketed by the Great Lakes Cruising Company: Yorktown, Grand Mariner, and Grand Caribe and has included Hapag-Lloyd's MS Hamburg operated by Plantours (formerly MS Columbus). The Great Lakes Cruising Coalition has attempted with limited success to support passenger ship cruises through a joint U.S-Canadian venture to Great Lakes ports and the St. Lawrence Seaway. Passenger cruise liners depart from and journey to ports throughout the Great Lakes including Chicago, Detroit, Mackinac Island, Toronto, and Montreal. William G. Milliken State Park and Harbor in downtown Detroit offers public docks for boaters.

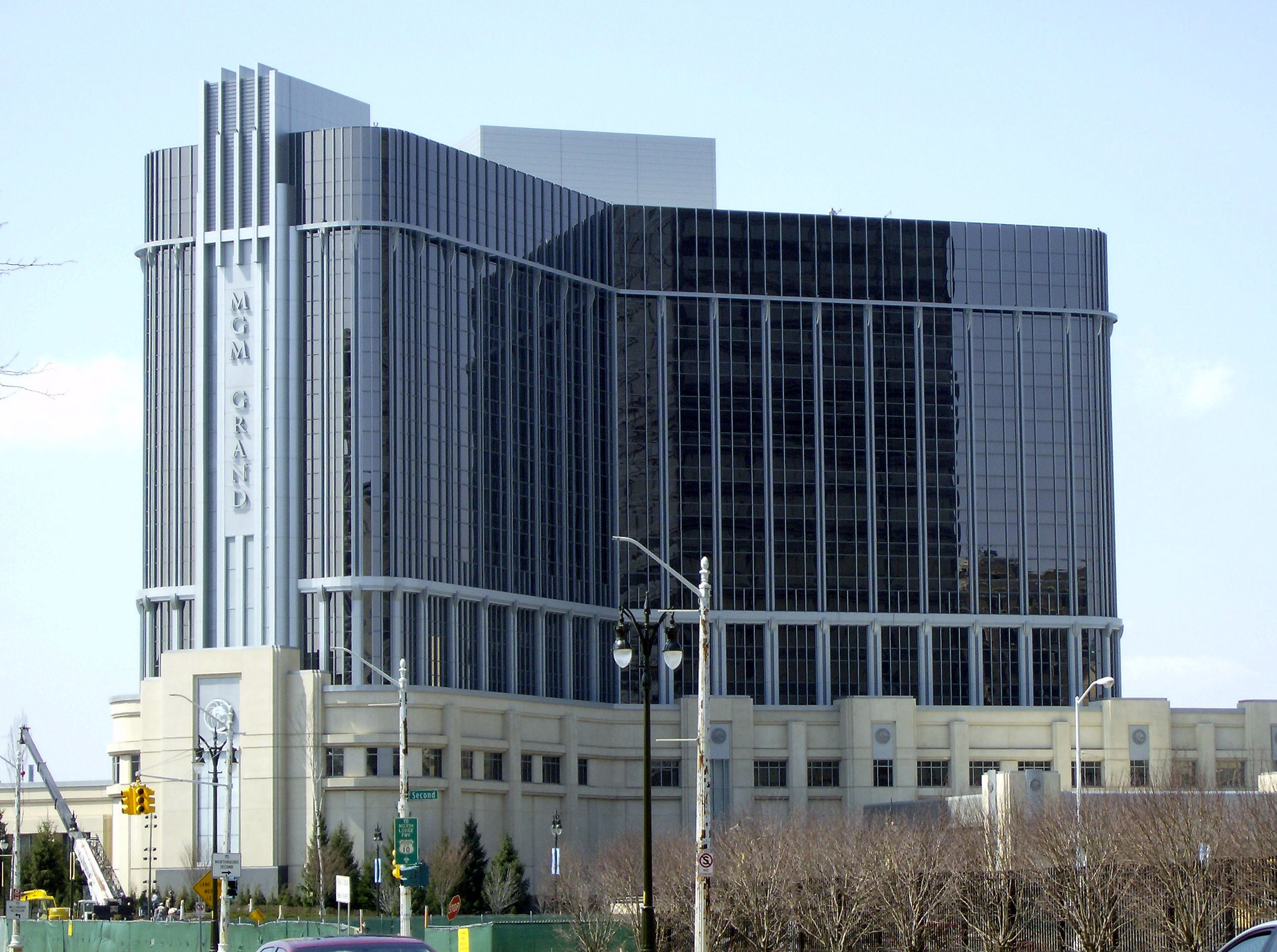
MGM Grand Detroit

The city's hospitality industry, with thousands of hotel rooms, routinely hosts major conventions and sporting events. The Marriott corporation and Starwood Hotels (Westin and Sheraton) have a significant presence in the region. In addition to its casino resort hotels, the area has many full-service hotels and resorts, including the historic flagship Westin Book Cadillac Hotel in Detroit's Washington Boulevard Historic District, restored in 2008, the historic Doubletree Guest Suites Fort Shelby Hotel downtown Detroit, restored in 2009, and the Detroit Marriott at the Renaissance Center on the waterfront which is one of the largest hotel conference facilities in the U.S. The centrally located Westin Southfield Detroit Hotel contains one of the region's major conference centers and Westin operates a hotel and conference center inside the Detroit Metropolitan Airport. Downtown Detroit has about 5,000 hotel rooms, with 4,000 in walking distance of the convention and exhibit facility TCF Center. The suburb of Novi has about 5,300 hotels rooms within a 10-mile (16 km) radius and the suburb of Pontiac has about 5,800 within a 10-mile (16 km) radius.

Historic Inns and boutique hotels represent a popular hospitality investment. The city's Midtown area includes restored Victorian bed and breakfasts such as the Inn on Ferry Street in the East Ferry Avenue Historic District adjacent to the cultural center near the Detroit Institute of Arts and the Inn at 97 Winder in Detroit's Brush Park Historic District near Comerica Park and Ford Field. Some notable historic Inns include The Dearborn Inn, a Marriott Hotel, near The Henry Ford, the Inn at St. John's golf resort in Plymouth, and Roberts Riverwalk Hotel Detroit. The Royal Park Hotel in Rochester, the Townsend Hotel in Birmingham, the Somerset Inn in Troy, the Athenium Suite Hotel in Greektown, and the Hotel St. Regis in the New Center are among the region's notable boutique hotels.

In 2003, General Motors completed a $500 million redevelopment of the Renaissance Center as its world headquarters. The east riverfront promenade development was planned at and additional $559 million, including $135 million from GM and $50 million from the Kresge Foundation. The International Riverfront is linked by the River Walk, a promenade along connecting the cruise ship dock on Hart Plaza to a series of parks, restaurants, retail shops, and other venues from the Marriott at the Renaissance Center to the Roberts Riverwalk Hotel on the historic Stroh's riverplace site. Compuware CEO Peter Karmanos played a role in the financing to reconstruct the city's historic restoration of Campus Martius Park which now hosts events such as the Motown Winter Blast in January attracting large crowds.

A nearly $300 million renovation and expansion project of Cobo Center convention and exhibit facility began July 2011 and is expected to be ready for the 2014 North American International Auto Show in January, with the remainder of the project scheduled to be completed by December 2014. The project will add meeting and exhibit space and glass walls to the exterior in order to provide views of the International Riverfront.

=== Shopping and restaurants ===
Somerset Collection adjacent to the Somerset Inn in Troy

Several traditional street-side shopping districts with clusters of restaurants may be found throughout the region in addition to those surrounding enclosed shopping malls and open-air lifestyle centers. Downtown Detroit contains Greektown, the Lower Woodward Avenue Historic District (Merchant's Row), and the shops and restaurants at the Renaissance Center along the International Riverfront. The Eastern Market, a farmer's distribution center in the central east side neighborhood area of Detroit, is the largest open-air bedding flower market in the United States and has more than 150 foods and specialty businesses. On Saturdays, about 45,000 people shop the city's historic Eastern Market. Other notable street-side shopping districts include The Village on Kercheval Avenue in Grosse Pointe and the downtown areas of Birmingham, Royal Oak, Northville, Rochester, and Plymouth.

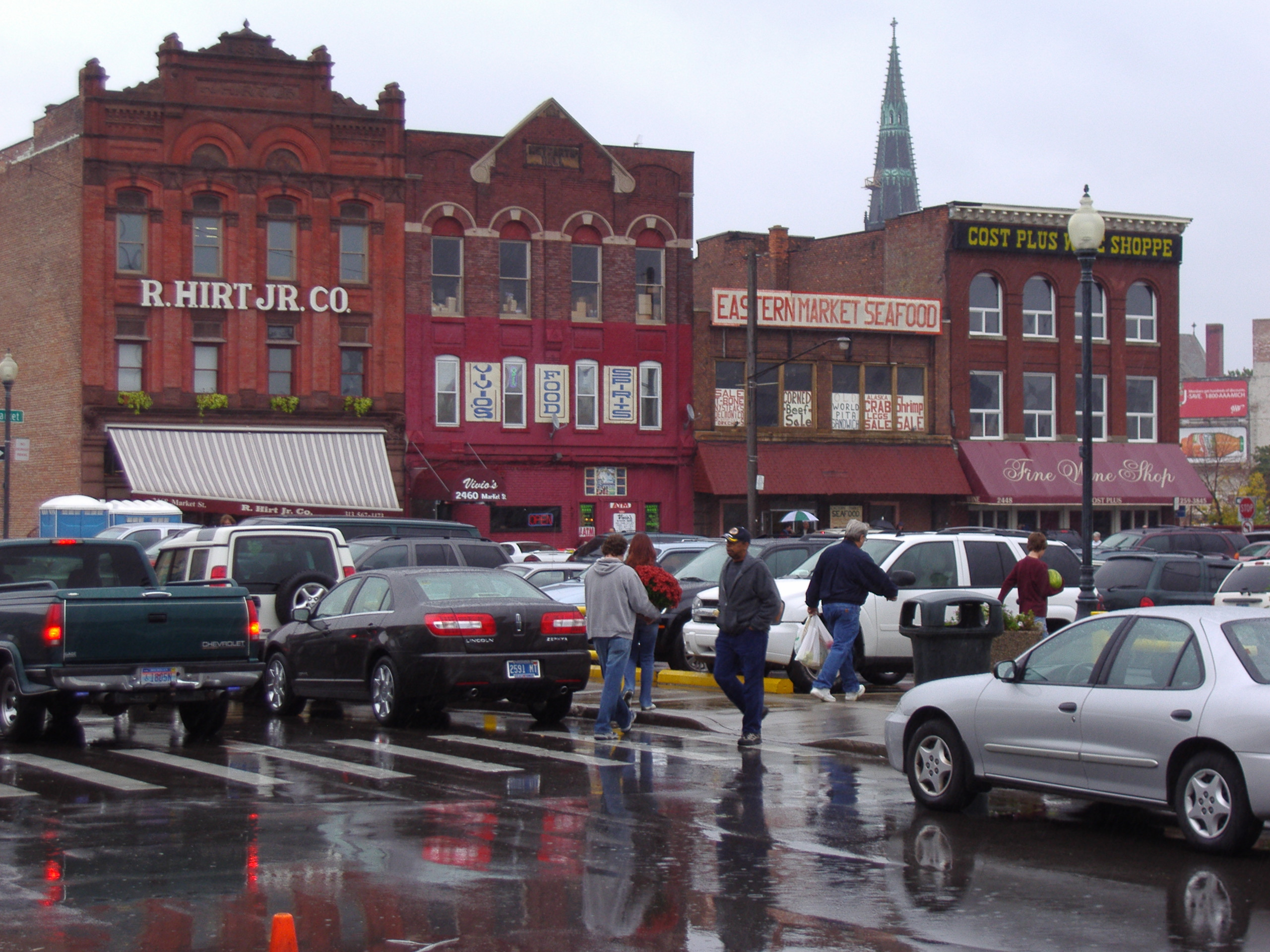
The R. Hirt Jr., Co. (1893) in the Eastern Market

Metro Detroit has many major enclosed shopping malls and open-air lifestyle centers with many restaurants. The upscale Somerset Collection mall in Troy is among the top privately held mall properties in the U.S. with 2004 annual sales of about $600 million and sales per square foot at $620 compared to the national average of $341. The Mall at Partridge Creek is an upscale open-air lifestyle center located in Clinton Township. Another upscale open-air lifestyle center is The Village of Rochester Hills. Other notable enclosed shopping malls in Metro Detroit include Lakeside Mall in Sterling Heights, Laurel Park Place in Livonia, Twelve Oaks Mall in Novi, which was expanded in 2007 to include Nordstrom, and Great Lakes Crossing Outlets in Auburn Hills. Ann Arbor, a college town, contains traditional street-side shopping along with the enclosed Briarwood Mall.

The Fairlane Town Center mall in Dearborn is about 15 minutes from downtown Detroit. A concept, the Pavilions of Troy, is mixed-use development design with an open-air lifestyle center envisioned for the Detroit suburb of Troy to complement the Somerset Collection mall.

=== Political impact ===
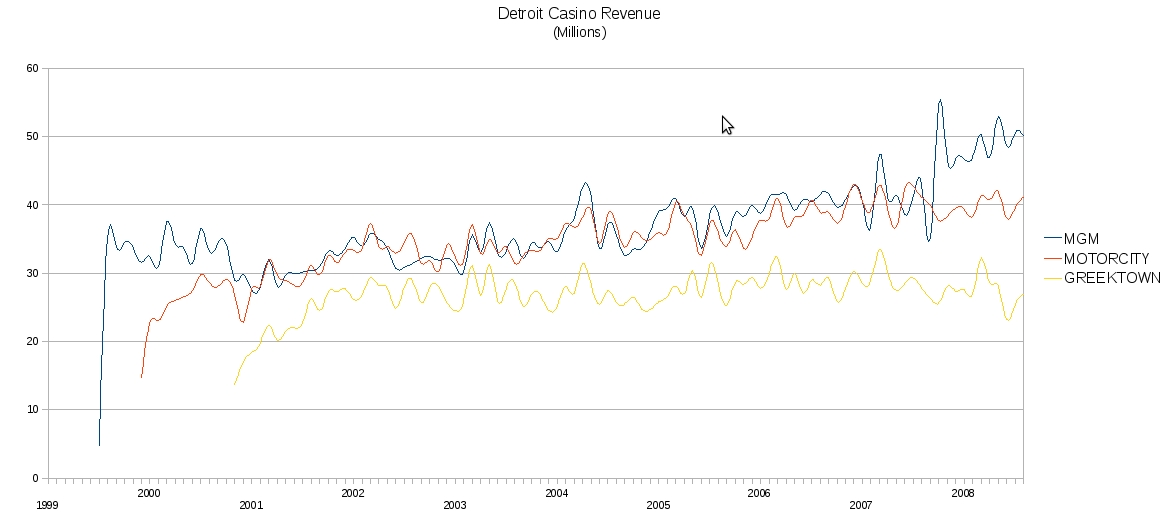
Revenue graph of casino resorts in Detroit

The city's mayor in the 1990s, Dennis Archer, also a former Michigan Supreme Court Justice, supported a plan which resulted in new casino resort hotels as a catalyst for development. Initially, Archer's plan was for a casino cluster along the east riverfront. In April 2005, after an eight-year legal battle over the bidding process, the courts cleared the way for the City of Detroit to permit its temporary casinos to build all new casino resort hotels, to open in late 2007. The settlement was further complicated by MGM's acquisition of Mandalay Bay, then owner of the Motor City Casino. Upon acceptance of the settlement, Detroit entrepreneur Marion Ilitch exercised her option to purchase Motor City Casino, outbidding other partners. The plan for the casino resort locations changed as the city decided instead to have a promenade of parks along the International Riverfront to spur residential development, thus freeing the casino companies to build in other areas of downtown. Upon completion, Detroit became the largest American city and metropolitan region to offer casino resort hotels. Since 2000, the city has seen a general trend of increased tax revenues from the three casinos; in 2009, casino resort hotels in Detroit employed 8,122 people, paid $452.8 M in wages (not including tips and benefits), and contributed $320 M in taxes to the city and state.

In decade leading up to 2006, downtown Detroit gained more than $15 billion in new investment from private and public sectors. In 2007, complementing the MGM Grand Detroit, DTE Energy announced a $50 million transformation of the area around its downtown headquarters into an urban oasis with parks, walkways, and a reflecting pool. Completion of the MGM Grand Detroit resort hotel in 2007 has opened new prospects for future development downtown with the west riverfront area and the area from MGM Grand Detroit to the Michigan Central Station. The question of how to finance a new convention facility to accommodate the expanding needs of the North American International Auto Show generated media attention and speculation with Oakland County Executive L. Brooks Patterson's proposal for a fourth casino resort hotel in Detroit to anchor the convention center following the example of the Las Vegas Sands Expo convention center which would need approval from a statewide referendum. Governor Jennifer Granholm ultimately signed legislation on July 2, 2009 that created a five-member board, appointed by the governor, the City of Detroit, and Wayne, Oakland, and Macomb counties to oversee the operation of the Cobo Center with the city retaining ownership in order to facilitate a major renovation. The nearly $300 million renovation of Cobo Center convention and exhibit facility includes the addition of glass walls to connect the complex with the waterfront.

Detroit's Belle Isle Park has "spectacular views" of the area. Some tourists are attracted to nearby Windsor, Ontario by Ontario's lower (19-and-older) drinking age.

A strategy entitled Pure Michigan resulted in the State's tourism website ranking as the busiest in the nation. Metro Detroit urban destinations such as The Henry Ford, the Detroit Institute of Arts, and the Detroit Zoo were also emphasized in the strategy. This led to support for proposals for increased funding in 2008 for the Travel Michigan budget from Detroit area legislators.

== Cultural centers ==
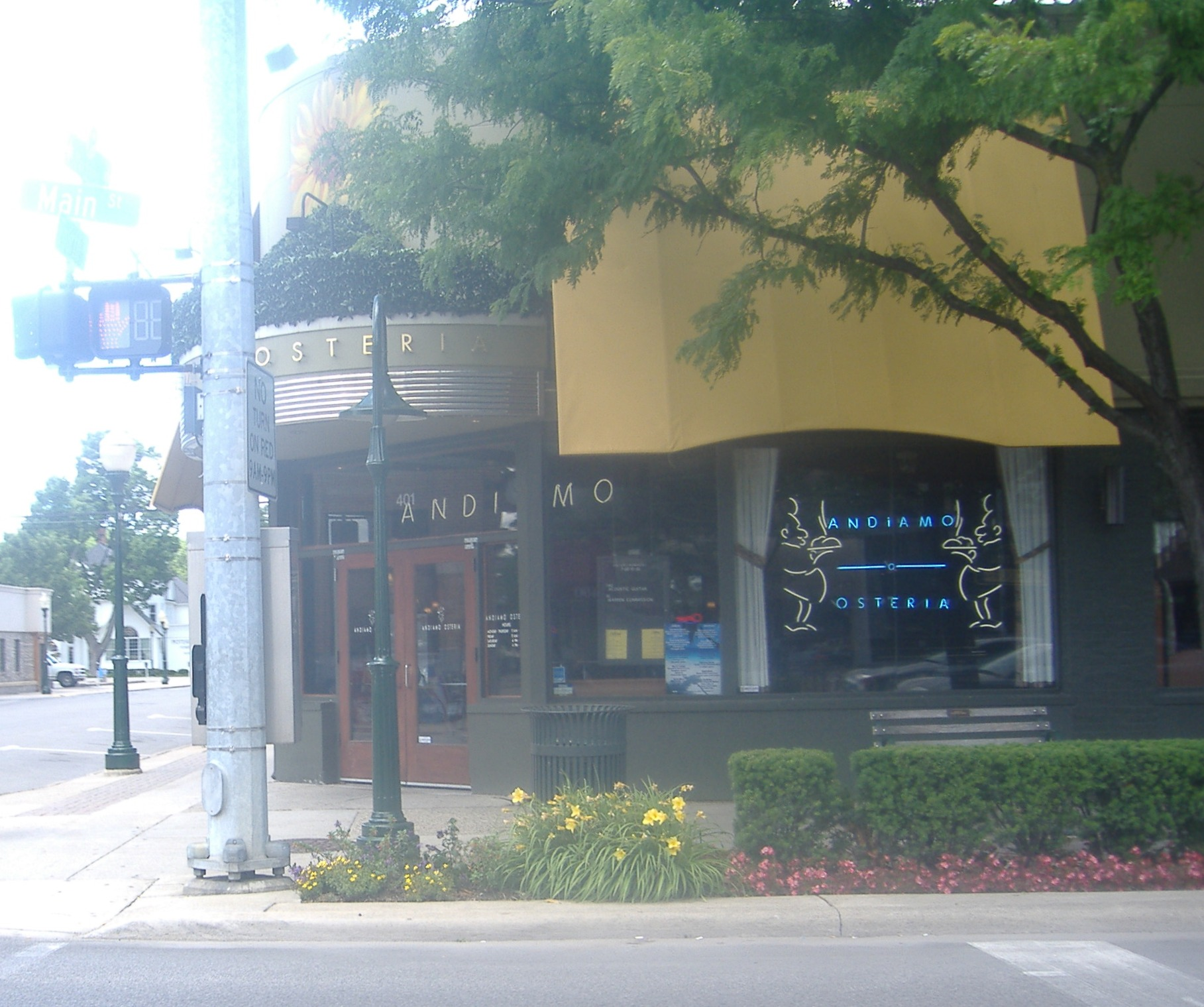
Rochester, settled in 1817

The Midtown Detroit surrounds Wayne State University, while the adjacent New Center area contains the National Historic Landmarks Cadillac Place and the Fisher Building. Midtown attracts millions of visitors each year to its museums and cultural centers. Other significant cultural centers include those in Dearborn, Bloomfield Hills, Birmingham, Grosse Pointe, Rochester, Royal Oak, and Ann Arbor. The fortunes of region's auto barons and business leaders continue to facilitate philanthropy for museums and cultural centers.

The Cultural Center Historic District in Midtown Detroit contains the Detroit Institute of Arts, the Rackham Education Memorial Building, the Detroit Historical Museum, the Detroit Science Center, and the Charles H. Wright Museum of African American History. The Detroit Public Library is part of the Cultural Center Historic District listed in the National Register of Historic Places adjacent to Wayne State University campus and across the street from the Detroit Institute of Arts. Designed by Cass Gilbert, the Detroit Public Library (1921) was constructed with Vermont marble and serpentine Italian marble trim in an Italian Renaissance style. His son, Cass Gilbert, Jr. was a partner with Francis J. Keally in the design of the library's additional wings added in 1963. Cass Gilbert also designed the United States Supreme Court building in Washington, D.C.

=== Detroit Institute of Arts ===
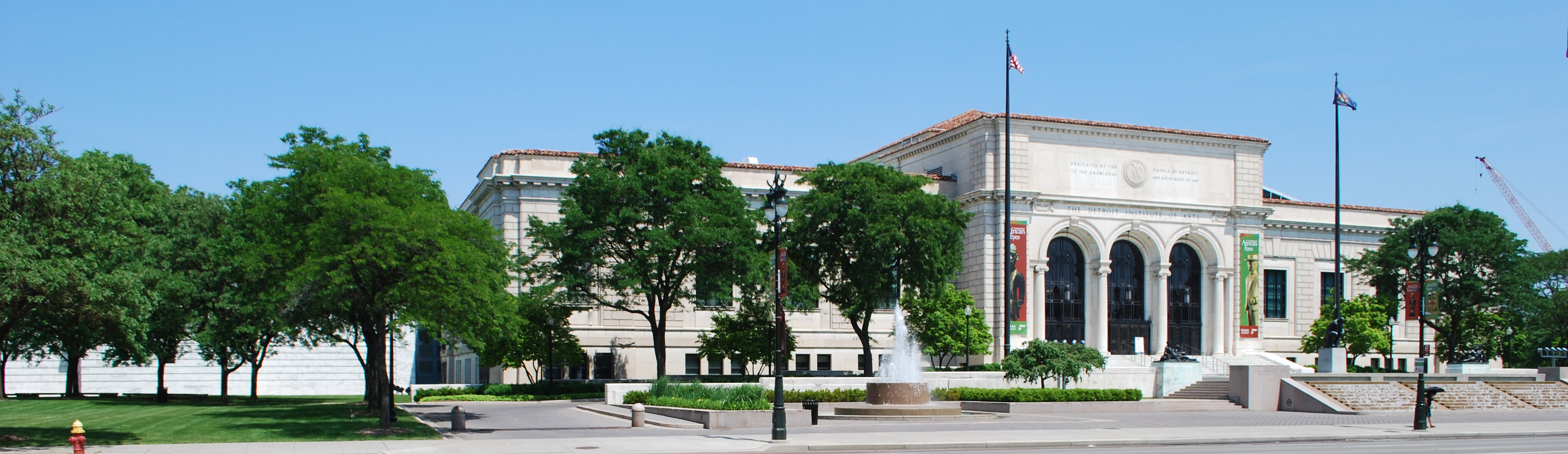
Detroit Institute of Arts

The Detroit Institute of Arts is among the largest art museums in the United States and contains over 100 galleries. The museum houses the 1150-seat Detroit Film Theatre, also used to showcase famous collections. Officials at the DIA have ranked the American paintings collection third among museums in the United States. Works by American artists began to be collected immediately following the museum's founding in 1883.

Entering the Detroit Institute of Arts' hallway, visitors pass the armor collection of William Randolph Hearst. Through the entry way is a grand marble court lined along the upper and lower levels with Diego Rivera's Detroit Industry Murals, commissioned by Edsel Ford. The French-American architect Paul Philippe Cret designed the Beaux Arts, Italian Renaissance building which opened in 1927. Michael Graves served as the architect for a major renovation and expansion in 2007. The original building is flanked by north and south wings with the white marble as the main exterior material for the entire structure. The museum is part of the city's Cultural Center Historic District listed in the National Register of Historic Places.

The collections of the Detroit Institute of Arts include ancient Greek, Roman, Etruscan, Mesopotamian, and Egyptian material, as well as a wide range of Islamic, African and Asian art of all media. Other notable art museums in the metropolitan area include University of Michigan Museum of Art in Ann Arbor and the Cranbrook Art Museum in Bloomfield Hills.

=== Entertainment ===
Theatre in Detroit is part of the Broadway theatre circuit. The Windsor-Detroit casino resorts have nightclubs, restaurants, and large performance centers for shows. Star performances in the city's theatre venue circuit complement major events such as North American International Auto Show. There are a number of popular nightclubs including the Necto in Ann Arbor, the three-level St. Andrews Hall in Detroit, and the nightclubs at the city's casino resort hotels.

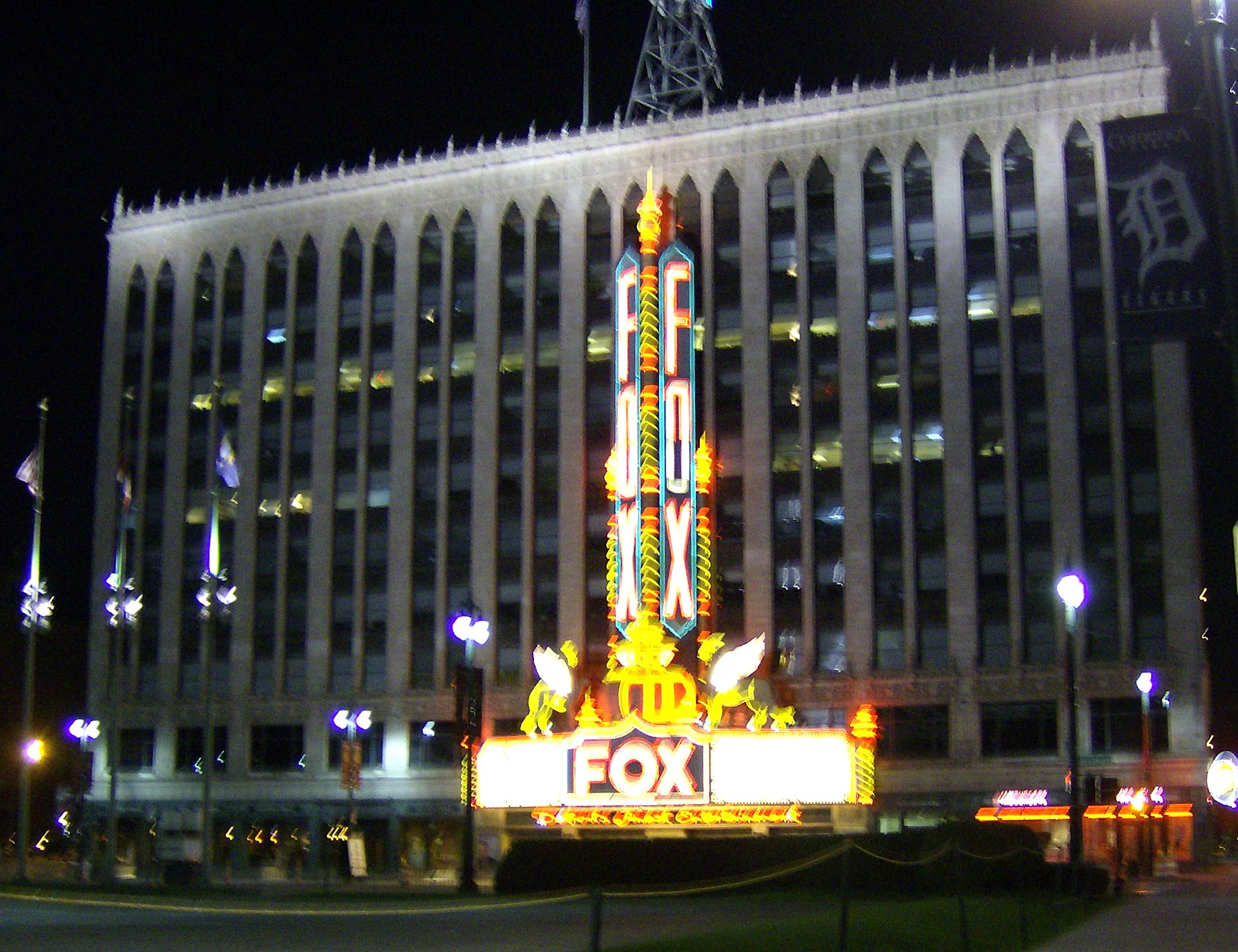
Fox Theatre is a National Historic Landmark near Detroit's Grand Circus.

Live music has been the prominent feature of Detroit's nightlife since the late 1940s bringing the city worldwide attention. The metropolitan area has two of the top live music venues in the United States: DTE Energy Music Theatre and The Palace of Auburn Hills Theatre in Detroit is the U.S.A.'s second largest venue circuit after Manhattan's Broadway. Major performance centers include the Fox Theatre, Masonic Temple Theatre, the Detroit Opera House, and the Fisher Theatre. Detroit's Orchestra Hall at the Max M. Fisher Music Center is the home of the Detroit Symphony Orchestra. The city hosts several annual music events, including the Detroit International Jazz Festival, the Electronic Music Festival, the Motor City Music Conference (MC2), the Urban Organic Music Conference, the Concert of Colors, and the hip-hop Summer Jamz music festival.

=== Events ===
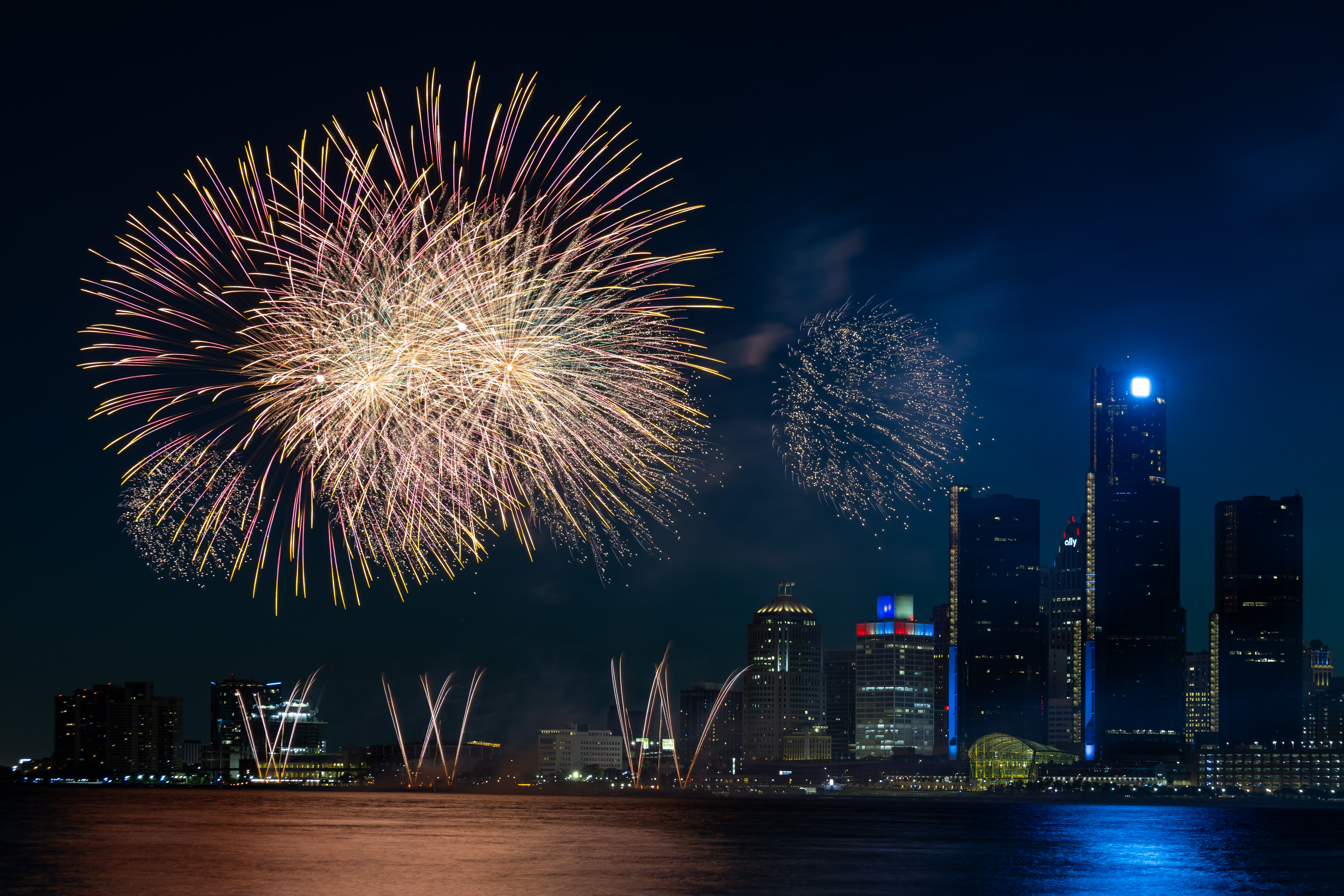
Fireworks at the Windsor–Detroit International Freedom Festival

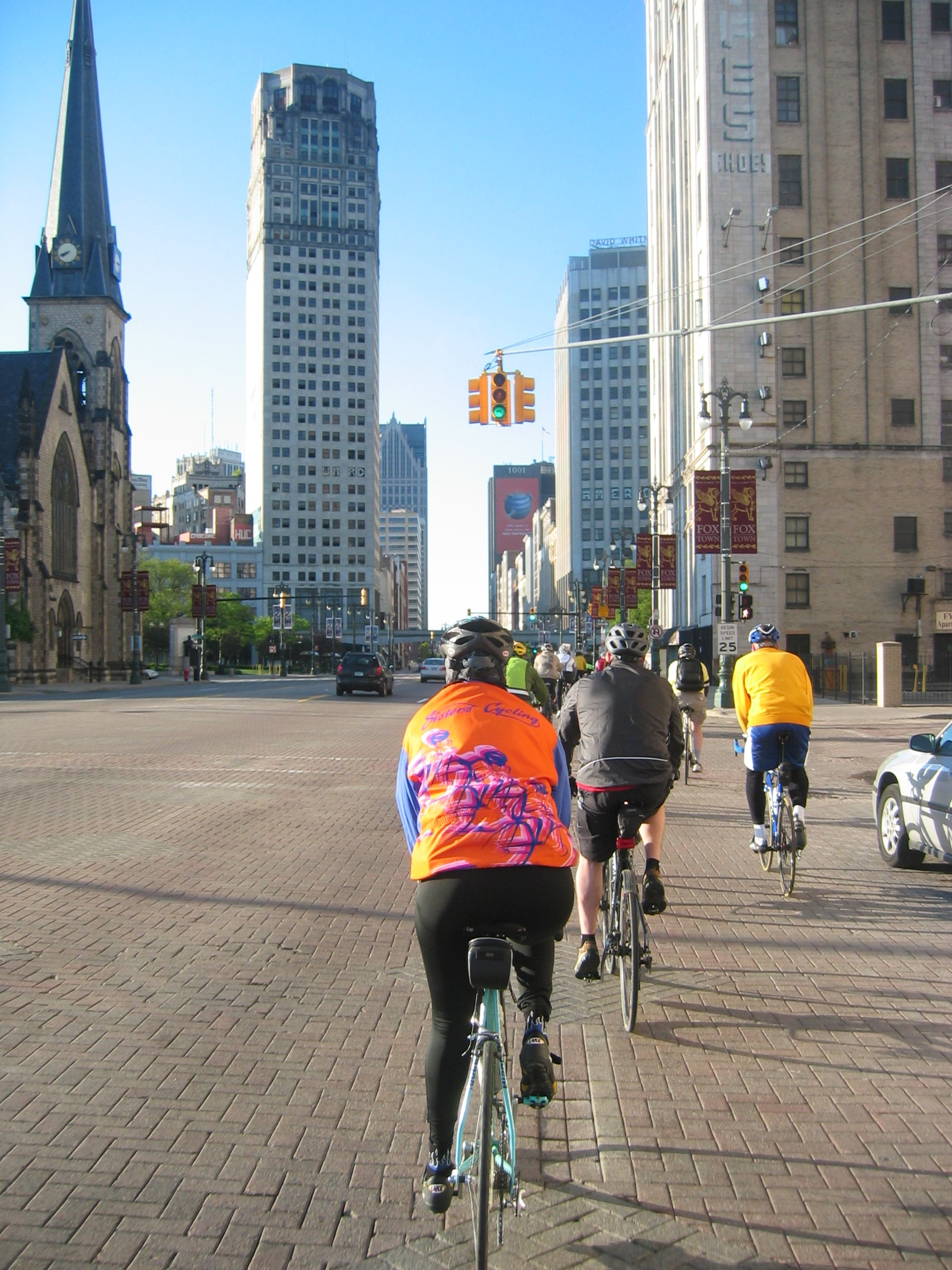
Cycling in Detroit on Woodward Avenue

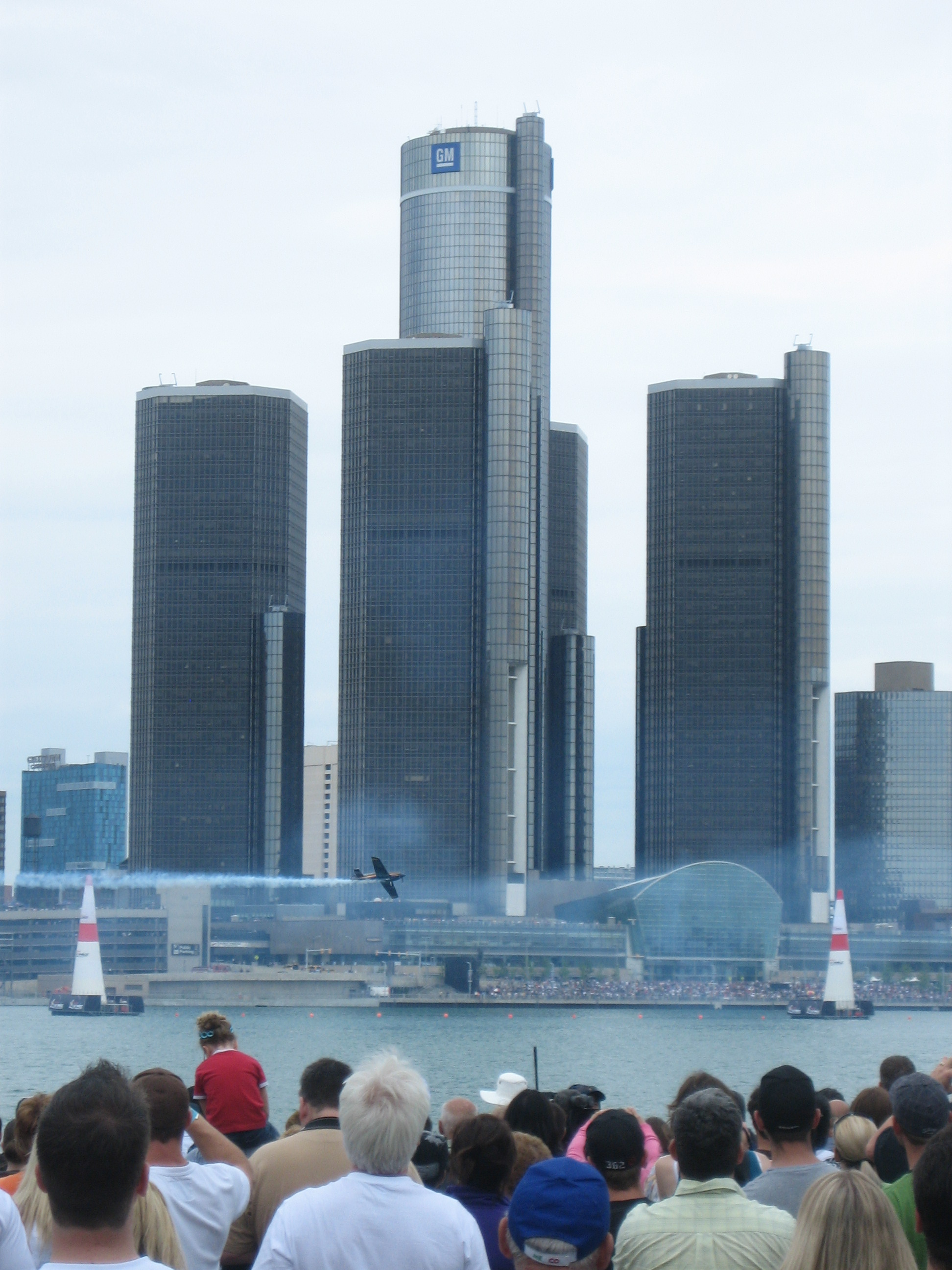
Red Bull Air Race World Championship along the International Riverfront

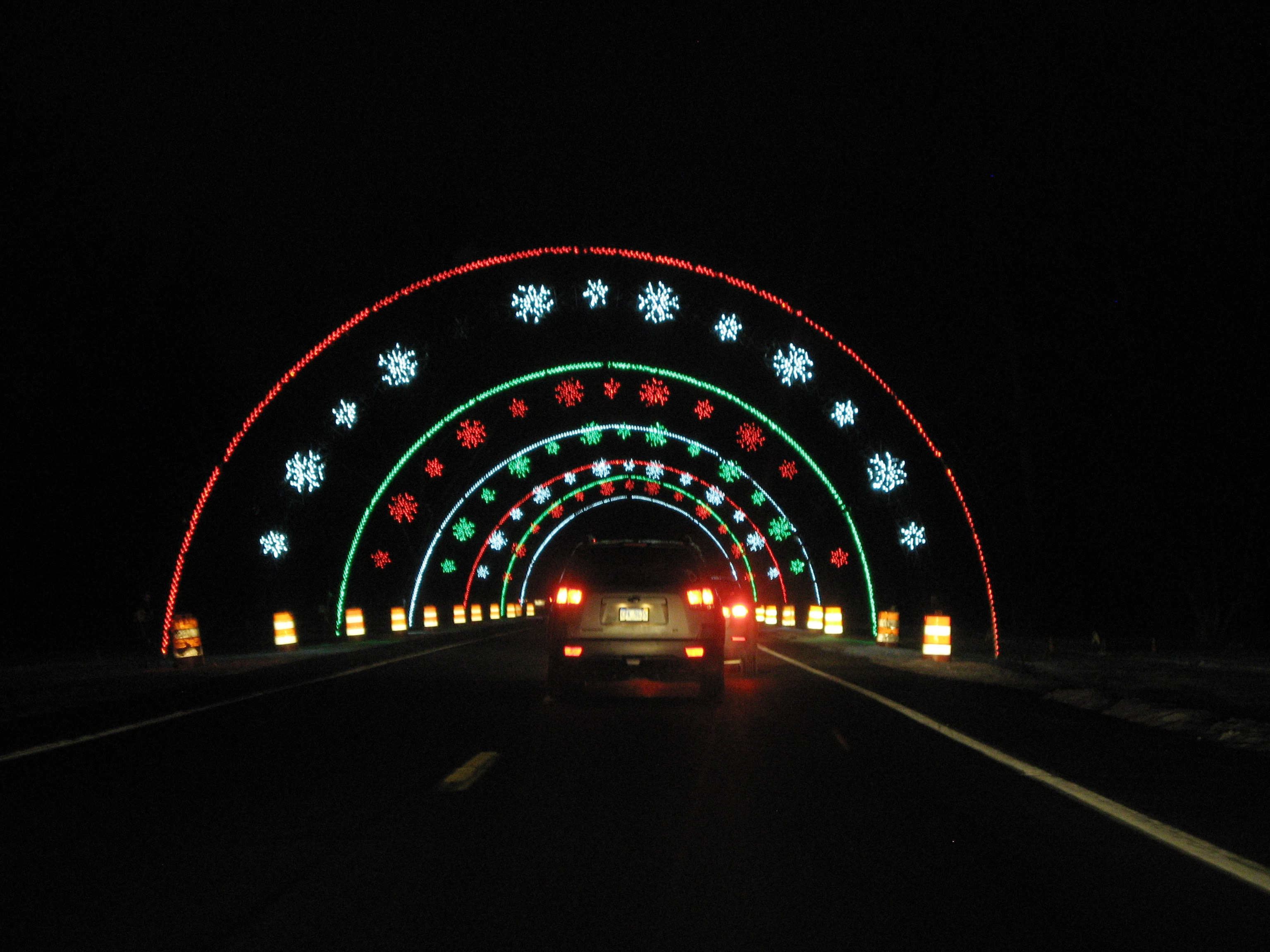
Wayne County Lightfest in December contain giant displays made of more than one million lights.

Major festivals and events	Timeline
North American International Auto Show	Huntington Place - January
Plymouth Ice Festival	Ice sculpture spectacular in January.
Motown Winter Blast	Campus Martius Park - January or February.
Detroit Music Awards	Held at The Fillmore Detroit Theatre in April.
Detroit Electronic Music Festival/Movement/Fuse-In	Memorial Day weekend.
Civil War Remembrance	Held at The Henry Ford on Memorial Day.
Detroit Indy Grand Prix	Downtown Detroit - June
Detroit Festival of the Arts	Midtown - early June
New Center Park summer events.	New Center summer-long series of events and out-door concerts held in coordinated by the New Center Council.
Motor Muster	Held at The Henry Ford on Father's Day weekend in June.
Detroit River Days	Detroit Riverfront- late June.
Windsor–Detroit International Freedom Festival	Last week of June.
Downtown Detroit Days and CityLoft shopping	Lower Woodward, last Thursday to Saturday of the month from June through August
Salute to America	Detroit Symphony Orchestra performs at The Henry Ford leading up to the Fourth of July.
Cruisin' Downriver	Held on the last Saturday of June in Southgate, Lincoln Park, Riverview, and Wyandotte.
Stars & Stripes Festival	Held in Mount Clemens leading up to the Fourth of July.
Wyandotte Street Art Fair	Mid-July.
Tall ships at the Dock of Detroit	Hart Plaza - summer.
Concert of Colors	Max M. Fisher Music Center - mid-July.
APBA Gold Cup	Detroit Thunderfest hydroplane races - August
Meadowbrook Concours d'Elegance	Formal event and classic car show at Meadowbrook Hall in early August.
Fash Bash - a leading fashion show and modeling event complementing Detroit Fashion Week	Coordinated by the Detroit Institute of Arts and held in the fall; venues have included the Renaissance Center, the Fox Theatre, and DIA Theatre.
People's Art Festival link	August
Woodward Dream Cruise	Third Saturday in August.
Meadow Brook Music Festival	Rochester Hills, July–September.
Arts, Beats and Eats	Royal Oak - Labor Day weekend.
Dally in the Alley	Labor Day weekend.
Detroit International Jazz Festival	International Riverfront - Labor Day weekend.
Rochester Art & Apples Festival presented by Paint Creek Center for the Arts	Weekend after Labor Day.
Old Car Festival Selfridge Air Museum	Greenfield Village at The Henry Ford typically the weekend after Labor Day.
Urban Organic Festival link	Every fall.
America's Thanksgiving Parade	November.
Noel Night link	December.
Motor City Comedy Festival	September
Wayne County Lightfest	December.
Theatre in Detroit	Spring, fall, and winter.
Youmacon	Anime convention held at TCF Center and the Renaissance Center in October or November, usually around Halloween.

=== Sports and recreation ===
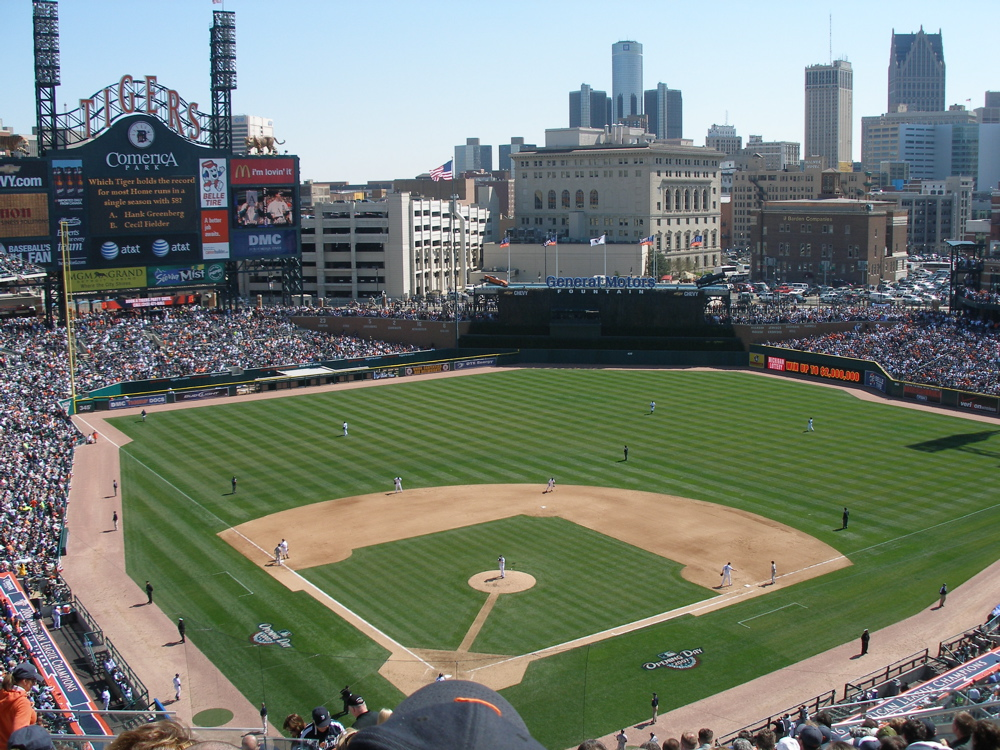
Comerica Park adjacent to Ford Field

The area has hosted several major sporting events in order to attract large crowds such as Super Bowl XL; in fact, Detroit is the only northern city to have hosted two Super Bowls. Ford Field hosted the 2009 NCAA Final Four, where North Carolina defeated Michigan State; in April 2007 it hosted WrestleMania 23. Major League Baseball's 2005 All-Star Game was held at Comerica Park, as were World Series games in 2006 and 2012 due to the Detroit Tigers's run of success in the late 2000s (decade) through the early 2010s. The 2005 All Star Game injected $52 million into the area economy, while Super Bowl XL injected $270 million. In 2008, the Detroit Tigers at Comerica Park reported 3.2 million visitors with a 98.6 percent attendance rate. Comerica Park and Ford Field stadiums are located near the Grand Circus Park Historic District.

The area has a 24,000-acre (97 km^{2}) network of "metroparks" which receives about 9 million visitors annually Outdoor activities in the metro region include downhill and cross-county skiing at Alpine Valley Ski Resort, Mt. Brighton, Mt Holly, and Pine Knob Ski Resort, Huron River kayaking and canoeing available through the Huron-Clinton Metroparks, and fresh water beaches such as Metro Beach, Kensington Beach, and Stony Creek Beach. Golf is an important sporting activity in the metropolitan area with a variety of courses, country clubs, and resorts. The Detroit River International Wildlife Refuge is the only international wildlife preserve in North America, uniquely located in the heart of a major metropolitan area. The refuge includes islands, coastal wetlands, marshes, shoals, and waterfront lands along 48 miles (77 km) of the Detroit River and Western Lake Erie shoreline.

== Sites of interest ==
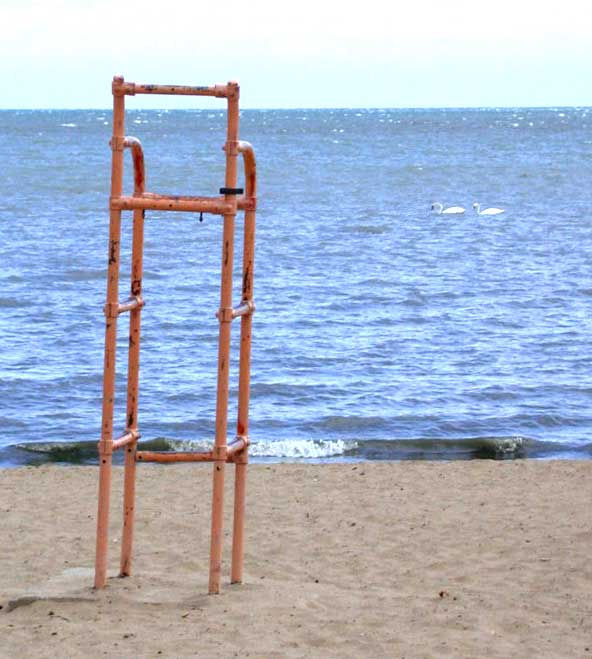
The beach on Lake St. Clair in the Metro Detroit community of St. Clair Shores

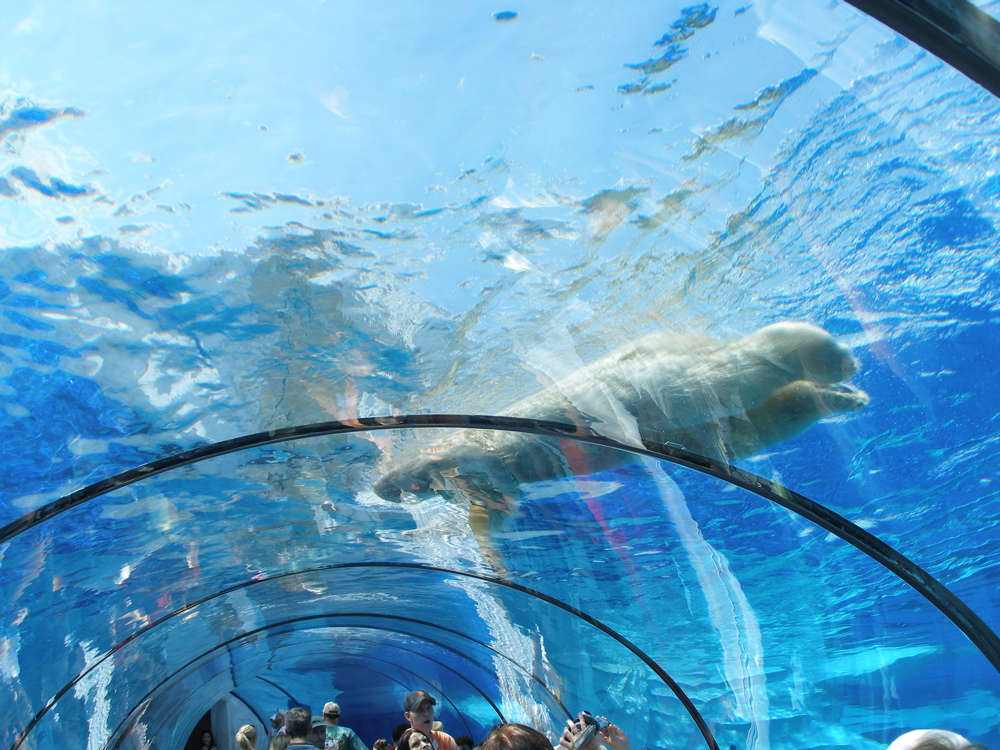
Detroit Zoo's Arctic Ring of Life and Rackham Fountain

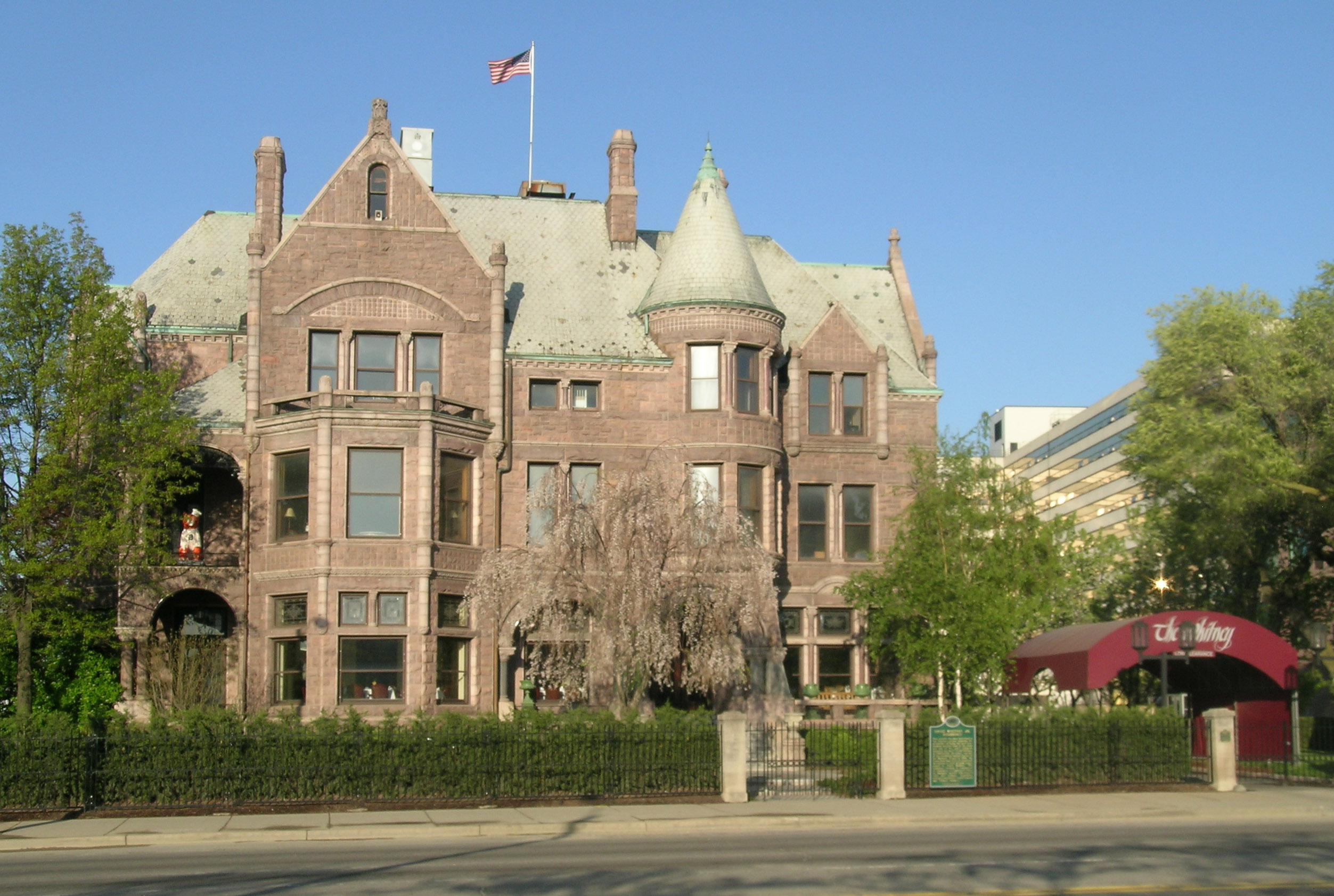
David Whitney House restaurant in Midtown is listed on the National Register of Historic Places.

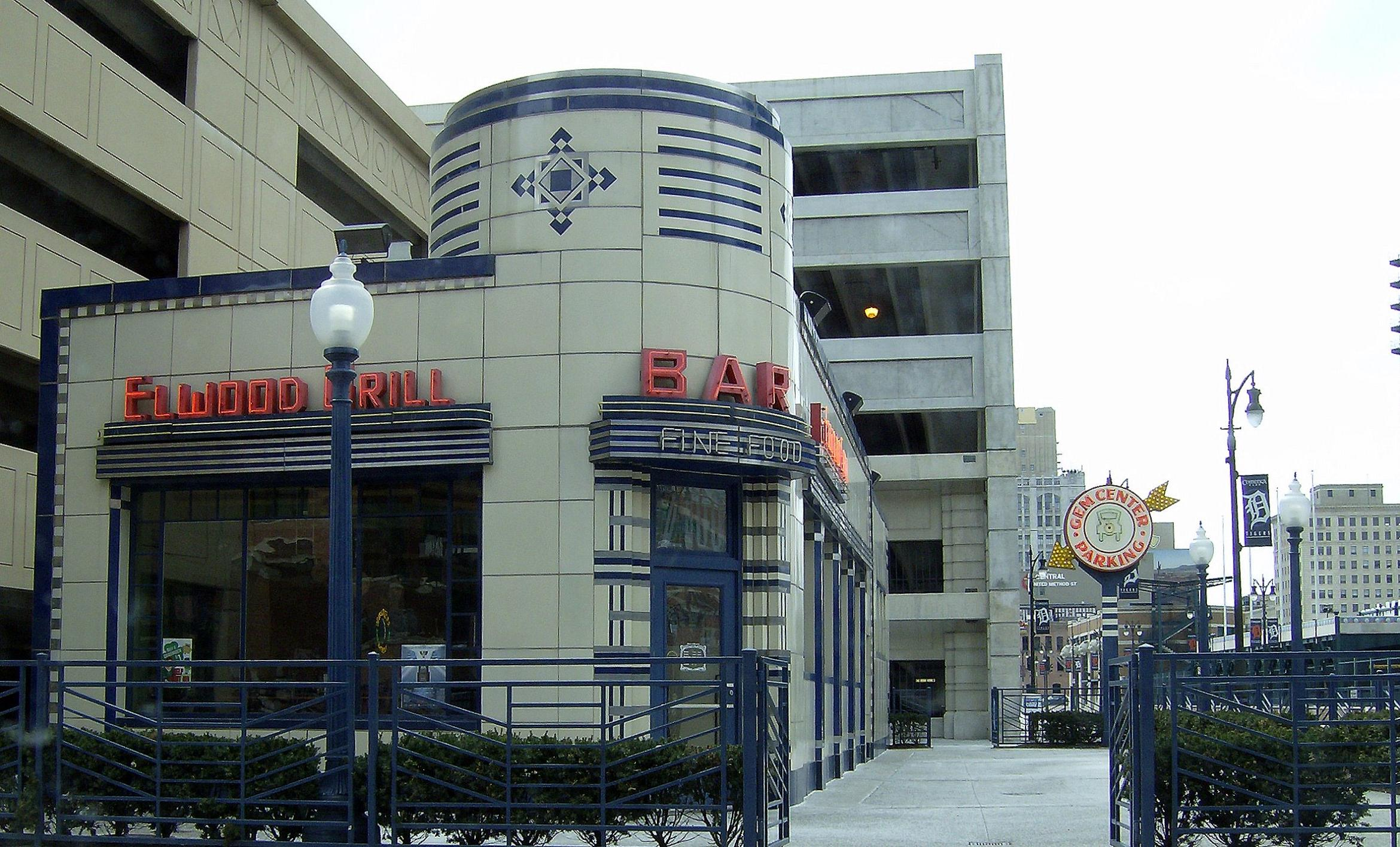
Elwood Bar and Grill, Downtown, is listed on the National Register of Historic Places.

Attractions	Metro location
Anna Scripps Whitcomb Conservatory	Belle Isle Park - Downtown
Architecture of metropolitan Detroit	City and suburbs
Automotive Hall of Fame	The Henry Ford - Dearborn
Charles H. Wright Museum of African American History	Midtown
Cranbrook Art Museum	Bloomfield Hills
Detroit Institute of Arts	Midtown
Detroit Historical Museum	Midtown
Detroit Science Center	Midtown
Theatre in Detroit	Downtown, Midtown, and New Center
Detroit Zoo	Royal Oak
Edsel and Eleanor Ford House tour	Grosse Pointe
Ford Piquette Avenue Plant	Milwaukee Junction
Grosse Pointe War Memorial, Russell A. Alger Jr., House	Grosse Pointe
Henry Ford's Fair Lane Estate tour	Dearborn
Kensington Metropark Beach	Milford
The Henry Ford	Dearborn
Lawrence Fisher House tour	383 Lenox Ave., Detroit
Meadowbrook Hall; Matilda Dodge-Wilson Estate tour	Rochester Hills
Metro Beach Metropark & Nautical Mile	Harrison Township; Lake St. Clair
Motown Historical Museum	New Center
Pewabic Pottery Museum	East Jefferson Avenue, Detroit
Pine Knob ski resort	Clarkston
Renaissance Center	Detroit International Riverfront
Sanders & Morley Candy Makers Chocolate Factory	Clinton Township
SEA LIFE Michigan Aquarium	Auburn Hills
The Russell; Art studios and shops	Midtown
Stony Creek Metropark Beach	Shelby Township

== See also ==
- Detroit celebrities
- Detroit-style pizza
- Images of Metro Detroit
- Michigan History magazine
- List of films set in Detroit
- Media in Detroit
- List of museums in Michigan
- Detroit-Windsor
