= Culture of Detroit =

The culture of Detroit, Michigan, has influenced American and global culture through its commercial enterprises and various forms of popular music throughout the 20th and 21st century. Its automotive heritage plays an important role in the city's culture.

== Entertainment and performing arts ==
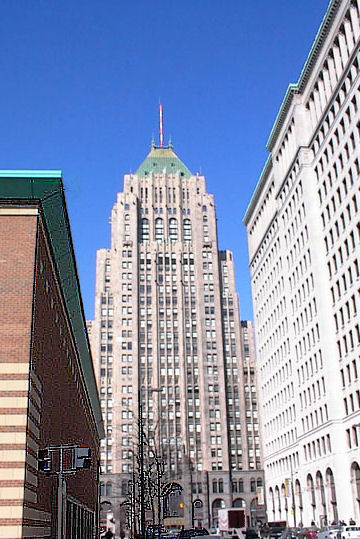
The Fisher Building, located in the city's New Center area, home to the Fisher Theatre.

Music has been the dominant feature of Detroit's nightlife since the late 1940s. The metropolitan area boasts two of the top live music venues in the United States. The Pine Knob Music Theatre (formerly DTE Energy Music Theatre), which was the most attended summer venue in the United States in 2005 for the fifteenth consecutive year, while the closed Palace of Auburn Hills ranked twelfth, according to music industry source Pollstar. Detroit's major performance centers include Orchestra Hall, home of the Detroit Symphony Orchestra, the Detroit Opera House, the Fox Theatre, Masonic Temple Theatre, the Fisher Theatre, and the Detroit Film Theatre at the Detroit Institute of Arts.

Throughout the 1950s, Detroit was centre of jazz genre of music, with stars of the era going to Detroit's Black Bottom neighborhood to perform. One highlight of Detroit's musical history was the success of Motown Records during the 1960s and early 1970s, which was founded in Detroit by Berry Gordy Jr. Popular recording acts including Marvin Gaye, Stevie Wonder, and Diana Ross & the Supremes come from Detroit. During the late 1960s, Aretha Franklin, a singer-songwriter from Detroit, became America's preeminent female soul artist, recording on the competing Atlantic Records label.

In the late 1960s, Metro Detroit was the epicenter for high-energy rock music with MC5 and Iggy and the Stooges, the precursors of the punk rock movement. Rock acts from southeast Michigan that enjoyed success in the 1970s were Bob Seger, Ted Nugent & The Amboy Dukes, Alice Cooper, The Romantics, and Grand Funk Railroad as well as more recent acts like Marshall Crenshaw, Kid Rock, The White Stripes, The Von Bondies, and Madonna. The Detroit area is generally accepted as the birthplace of the Techno movement, which has grown from local radio and clubs to dance venues worldwide. The three musicians most frequently credited with giving birth to Techno are Derrick May, Juan Atkins, and Kevin Saunderson. Hip hop rose to prominence in the late nineties with the emergence of Eminem, the rap artist with the highest cumulative sales. Other Detroit hip-hop artists include Insane Clown Posse, Aaliyah, D12, Royce Da 5'9", Danny Brown, Teairra Mari, Obie Trice, Trick Trick, Rock Bottom, and the late Blade Icewood, Slum Village.

Birth to a new music culture beginning in the 2010s, Trap music has attracted new audiences and seen huge growth in the mainstream market, new hip-hop artists like Babyface Ray, Payroll Giovanni, Teejayx6, Tee Grizzley, Doughboyz Cashout began to gain popularity.

=== Fashion ===
The annual "Fash Bash," a major fashion event, typically held in the Renaissance Center's Winter Garden or the Fox Theatre in August celebrates Detroit Fashion Week. Coordinated by the Detroit Institute of Arts, the event features celebrities and models showcasing the latest fashion trends.

Fashion designers that have enjoyed global success include Anna Sui who was born and raised in the city. The designer draws heavy inspiration from Detroit's music scene of the 1960s and 1970s including local bands such as the MC5.

In 1991, a cultural phenomenon began among hair salons which evolved into the Detroit Hair Wars. Trendsetting salons, like Hair N Shears II, on The Avenue of Fashion, helped usher in this trend. A showcase of fantastical hairpiece creations, often using human hair as the main content, has since become a national trend among African-American hair-styling tours.

== Festivals and events ==
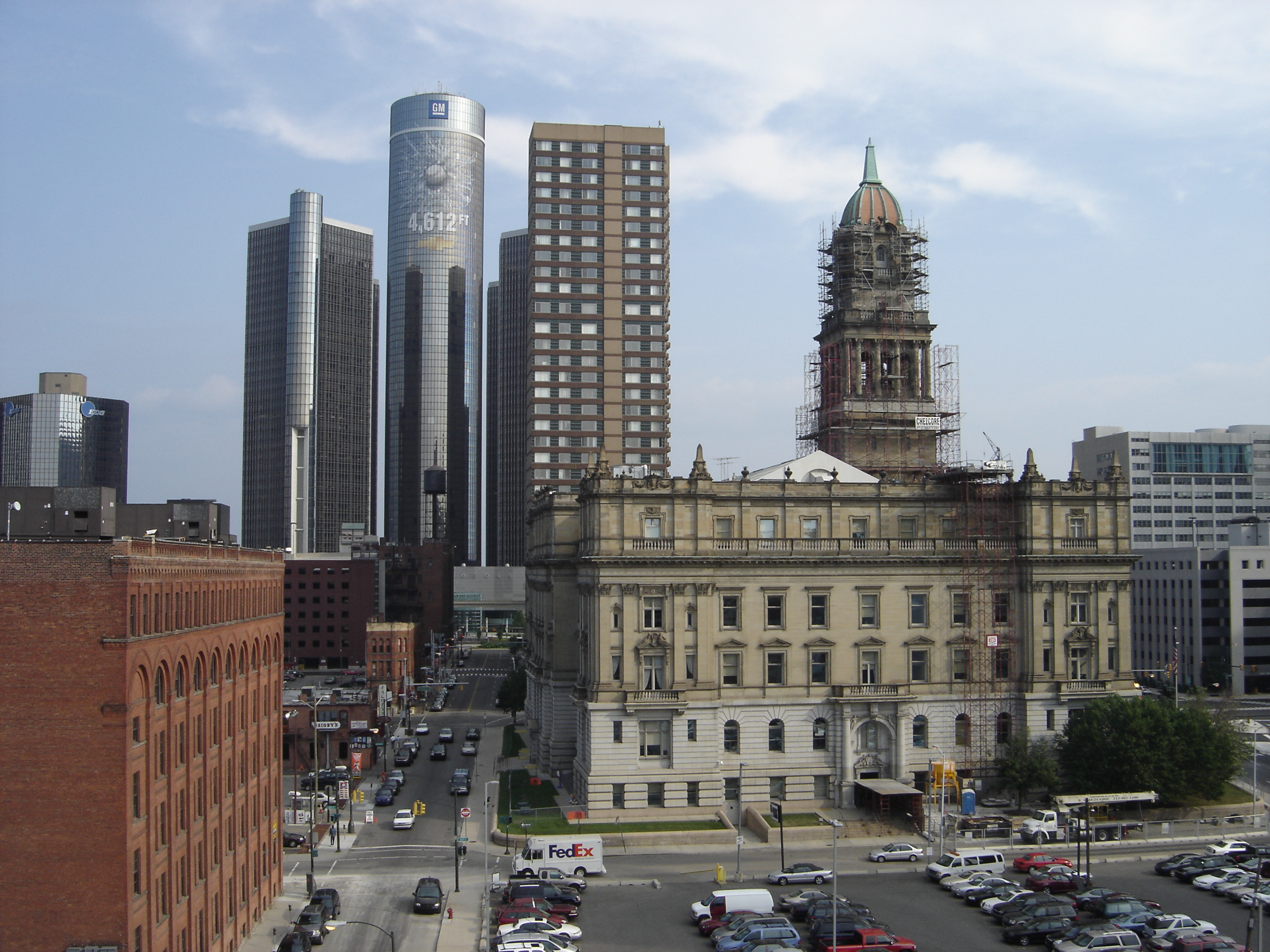
The giant decal on the Renaissance Center, for the 2005 MLB All-Star Game, represents 4,612 feet (1,375 m) to the home plate in Comerica Park.

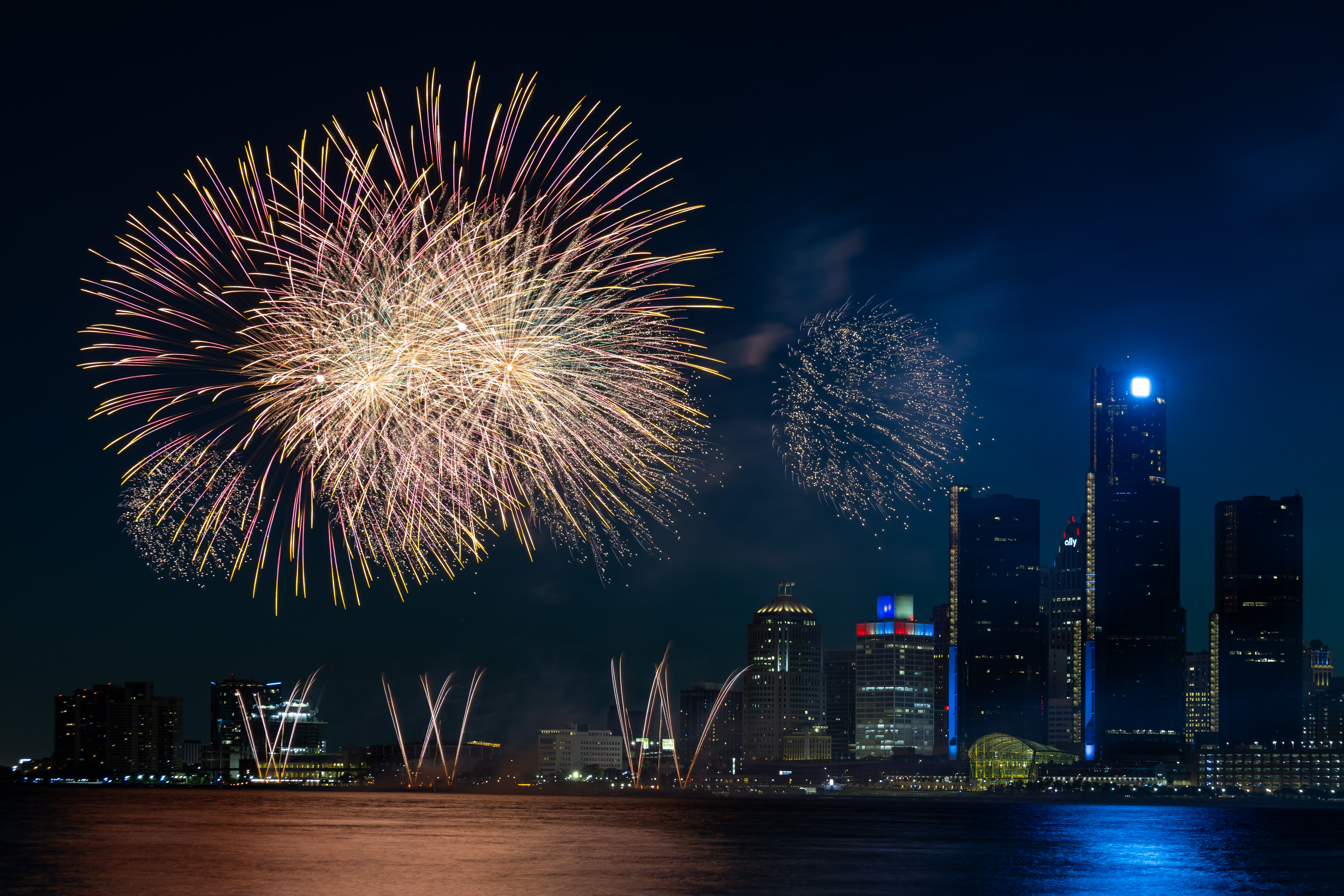
Fireworks at the Windsor-Detroit International Freedom Festival

Detroit has three major events that are associated with the automobile industry: the North American International Auto Show (January until 2019, then June), Society of Automotive Engineers world congress (April) and the Woodward Dream Cruise (August). Annual music events in the city include the DEMF/Movement/Fuse-In electronic music festival (May), Concert of Colors (July), Ford Detroit International Jazz Festival (September), Dally in the Alley (September) and Arts, Beats and Eats (September). Annual art events include the Dirty Show International Erotic Exhibition (February), People's Art Festival (August), the DAMNED Exhibition (October), and Noel Night (December).

The Windsor-Detroit International Freedom Festival features a fireworks display over the Detroit International Riverfront and coincides with U.S. Independence day (July 4) and Canada Day (July 1). The Detroit Windsor International Film Festival is a major film festival also shared with the city of Windsor. The New Center summer events and Detroit Thunderfest hydroplane races which take place in July. African World Festival and Detroit Fashion Week happen in August. The America's Thanksgiving Parade, originally the Hudson's Thanksgiving Day Parade, is one of the nation's largest and has been held continuously since 1924.

Hosted by the United Irish Societies, the Detroit St. Patrick's Parade is one of the largest St. Patrick's parades in North America and is held annually in Corktown.

The day before Ash Wednesday, or the festival of Mardi Gras/Fat Tuesday, is more frequently celebrated locally as "Paczki Day" by the large Polish population. Many Metro Detroiters join in the festivity by indulging in jelly-filled donuts called paczkis.

The Bayview yacht club sponsors the annual Port Huron to Mackinac Boat Race as well as a number of other regional and local regattas.

Two large LGBT Pride events are held annually in Detroit. Motor City Pride, started in 1972 and currently produced by Equality Michigan, is held the second weekend of June in Hart Plaza and is attended by over 40,000 people. Hotter Than July! is a week-long black gay pride celebration held annually since 1996 is attended by over 20,000 people and produced by the Detroit Black Pride Society and KICK.

Events introduced in the 2010s include the Motown Winter Blast in February and the Detroit River Days in June .

== Ethnic culture ==
Greektown Historic District is a popular restaurant and entertainment district established by Greek immigrants and residents, having many restaurants that serve Greek cuisine, as well as one of the city's three casinos, Hollywood Casino. Certain buildings on Monroe Street are themed to resemble the Parthenon, Pegasus, and other forms of Greek architecture. Greek music is played on Monroe Street throughout the day. Well-known restaurants include The Laikon Cafe, Cyprus Taverna, Pegasus Taverna, and Pizza Papalis. St. Mary Roman Catholic Church, founded by German immigrants, is located in the heart of the district. Jacoby's German Biergarten (1904), the city's oldest surviving pub, provides a small performance space for up & coming acts in nearby Bricktown. German immigrants also founded St. Joseph Roman Catholic Church on the city's central east side, near the Eastern Market Historic District. Immigrants contributed to the area's notable architecture, especially during the Gilded Age.

Corktown Historic District is the oldest surviving neighborhood in Detroit, dating to the 1850s. The name comes from the Irish immigrants who settled there; they were predominantly from County Cork. The neighborhood is primarily residential, but the district does include some commercial buildings, mostly along Michigan Avenue.

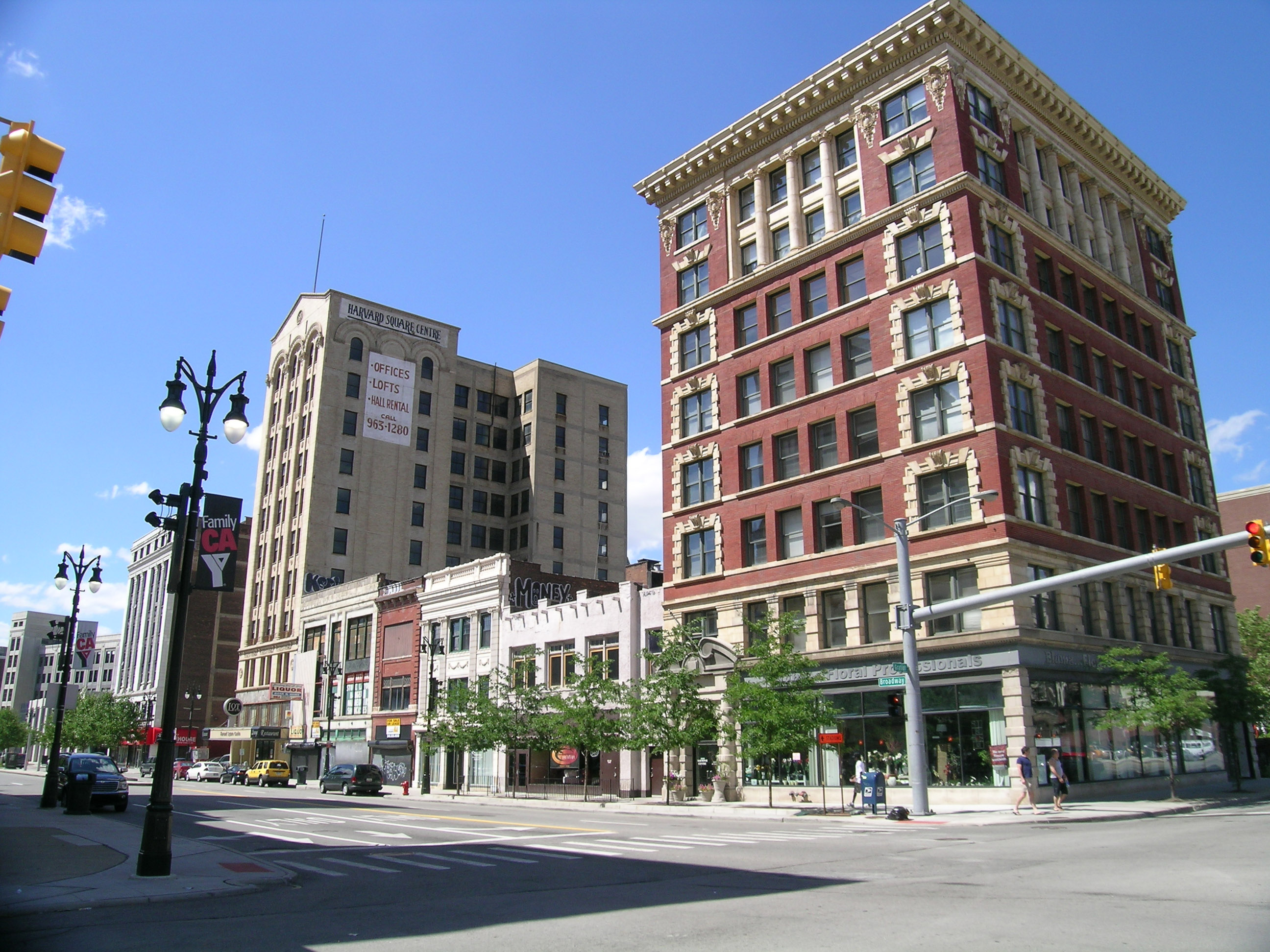
Harmonie Centre in Detroit's Broadway Avenue Historic District.

Mexicantown had a 6.9 percent population rise to 96,000 from 1990 to 2000, the city's revitalized Mexicantown has improved the local economy. About half the residents are Hispanic, 25% are African-American, 20% are White and 5% are Arab-American, according to the Southwest Detroit Business Association. It is known for Mexican cuisine at restaurants such as Mexican Village, Evie's Tamales, El Zocalo and Xochimilco. Restaurants, bakeries, and shops are located on Vernor Highway. Mexicantown has had a thriving economy in the 2000s, as evidenced by new housing and increased business openings. Ste. Anne de Detroit Catholic Church is north of the Ambassador Bridge. West Vernor-Junction Historic District, another largely Hispanic neighborhood, which contains the Most Holy Reedemer Church is adjacent to Mexicantown.

The Detroit area's diverse population includes French, Belgian, German, Hispanic, Polish, Greek, Italian, Middle Eastern, and Black populations, with each adding its rich cultural traditions. Detroit became famous for its music legacies; major blues singers, big bands, and jazz artists—such as Duke Ellington, Billy Eckstine, Pearl Bailey, Ella Fitzgerald, and Count Basie—regularly performed in night clubs.

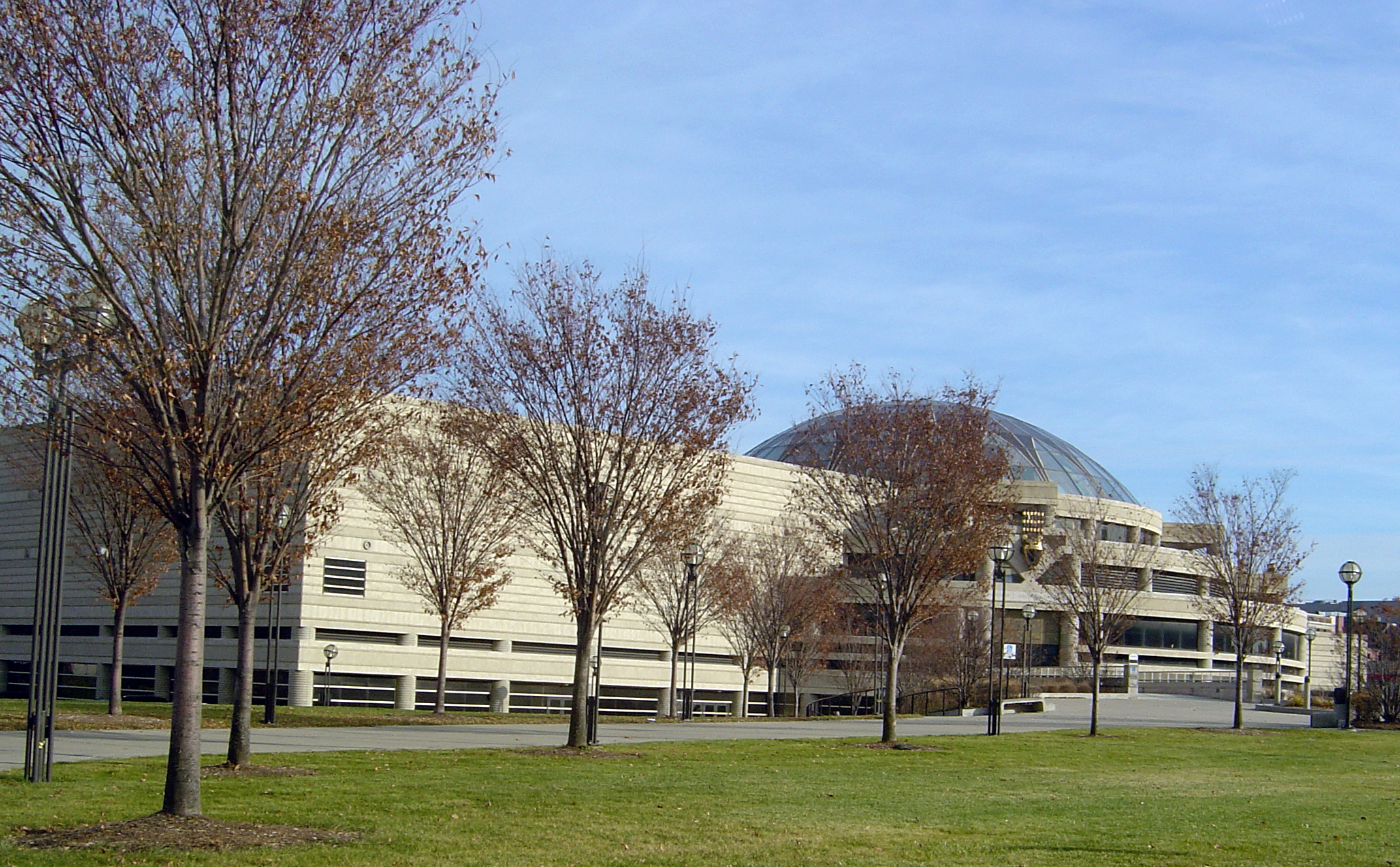
Charles H. Wright Museum of African American History.

The east necklace of downtown links Grand Circus and the stadium area to Greektown along Broadway. The east necklace contains a sub-district sometimes called the Harmonie Park District in the Broadway Avenue Historic District which has preserved part of the renowned legacy of Detroit's music from the 1930s through the 1950s and into the present. The historic Harmonie Club and Harmonie Centre are located along Broadway. The Harmonie Park area ends near Gratiot and Randolph. Near the Detroit Opera House, and emanating from Grand Circus along the east necklace, are other venues including the Music Hall Center for the Performing Arts and the Gem Theatre and Century Club.

In 1959, Berry Gordy founded Motown Records, one of the first black-owned record labels. Over the next decade, a number of top artists, including The Supremes, The Temptations, Stevie Wonder and Marvin Gaye, signed with the label. The Second Baptist Church once served as "station" for the Underground Railroad. A monument to the Underground Railroad was erected in 2001 at Hart Plaza downtown.

The Shrine of the Black Madonna of the Pan-African Orthodox Christian Church was founded in 1953 by the Rev. Albert B. Cleage. One of the churches' institutions is the Shrine of the Black Madonna Cultural Center & Bookstore, one of the nation's oldest black-owned bookstores.

The Graystone International Jazz Museum documents jazz in Detroit.

Perhaps the most legendary is Joe Louis, heavyweight boxing champion from 1937 to 1949. Louis is memorialized with a sculpture of a giant fist at the intersection of Jefferson and Woodward Avenues, as well as in the name of Joe Louis Arena.

== Cultural and social clubs ==
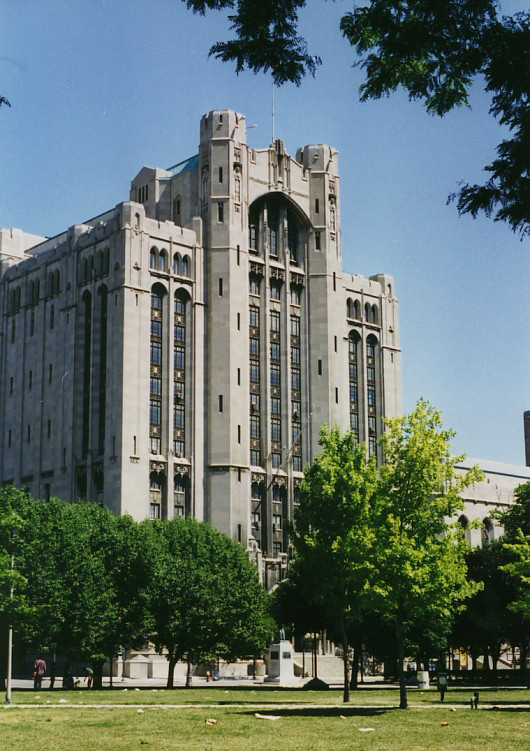
The world's largest Masonic Temple, the Detroit Masonic Temple serves as home to a variety of fraternal and charitable organizations.

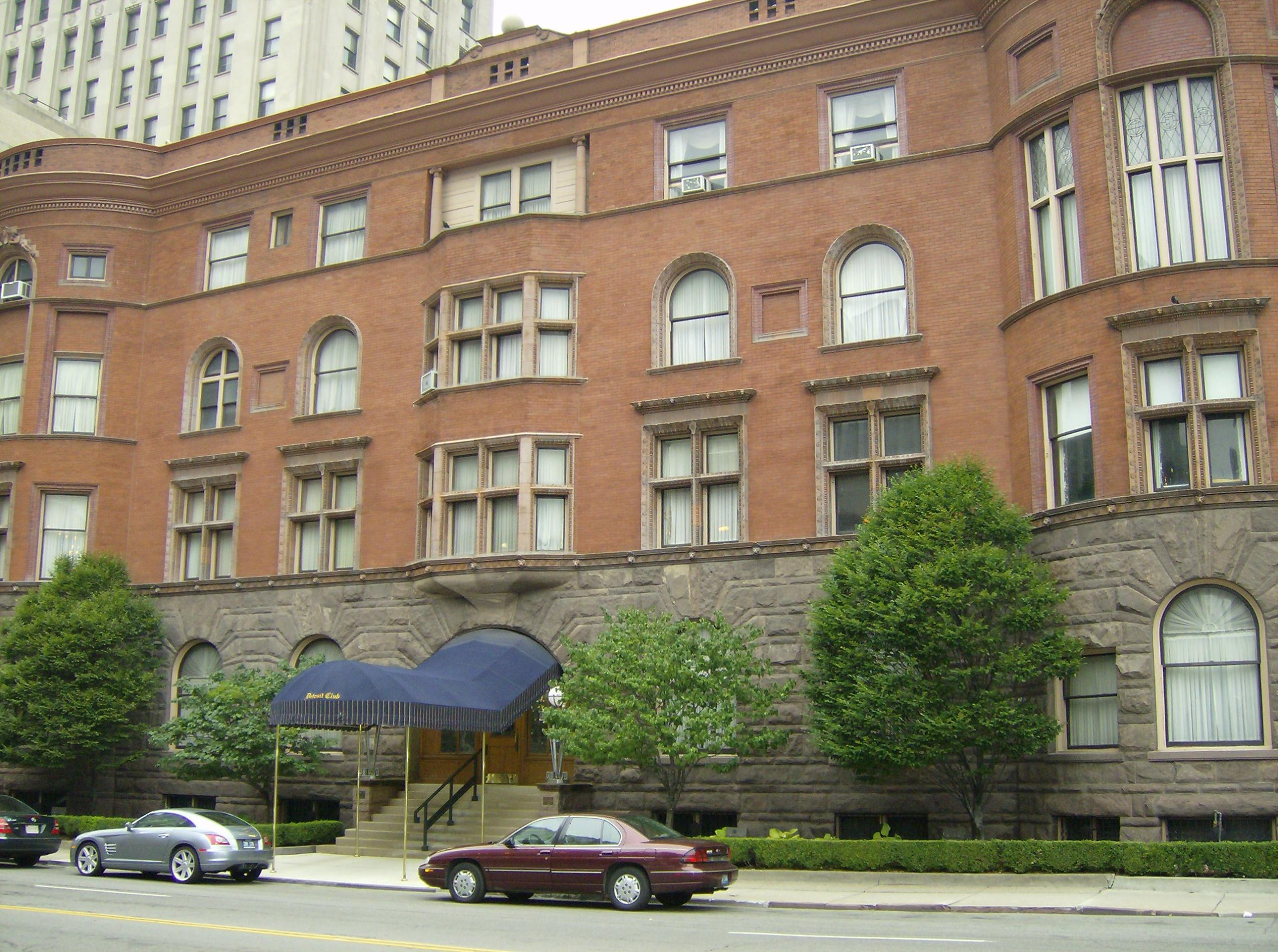
Over a century of Detroit business leaders have belonged to the Detroit Club founded in 1882.

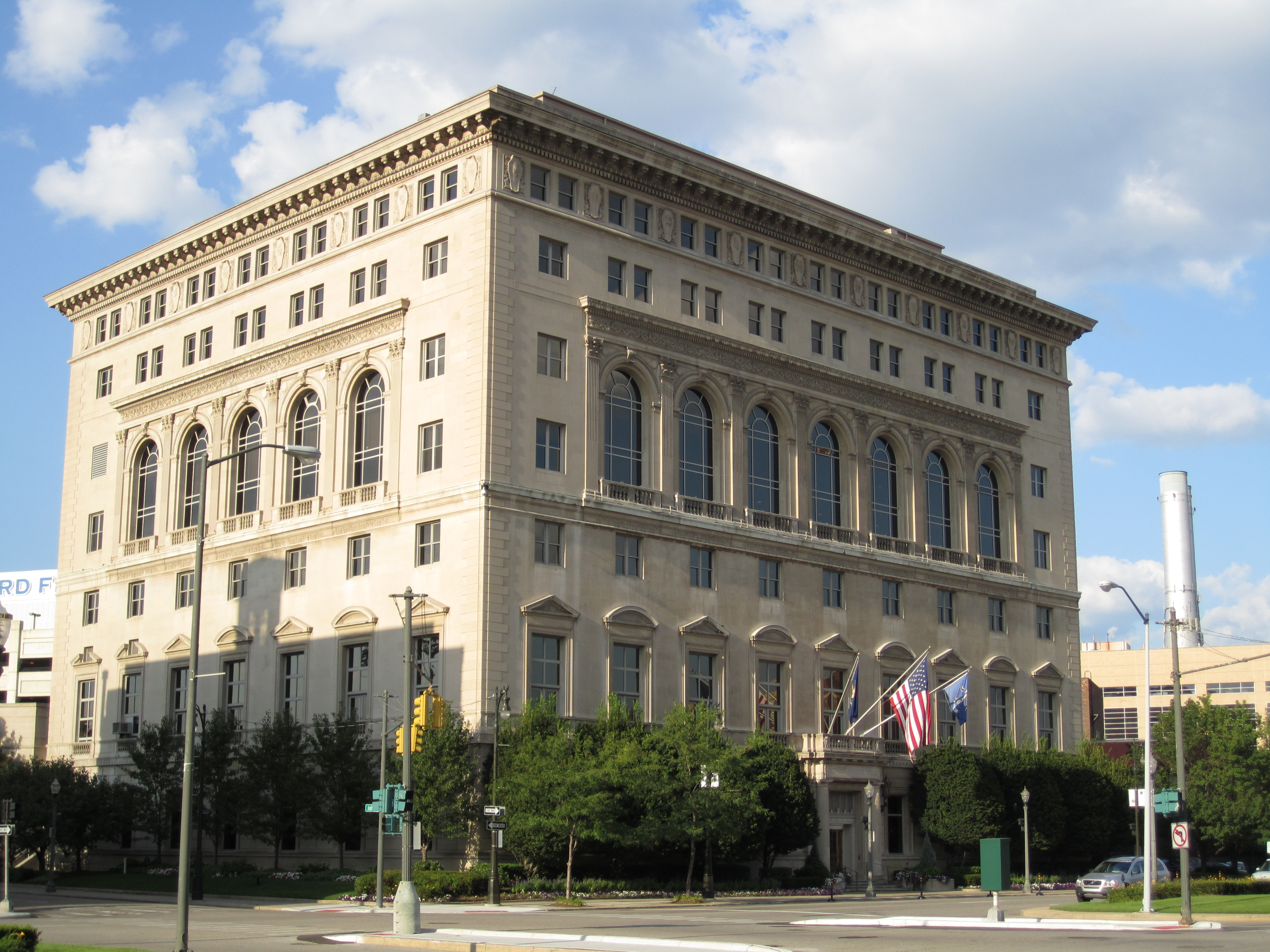
Private sporting clubs include the Detroit Athletic Club, the Detroit Golf Club, and the Detroit Boat Club

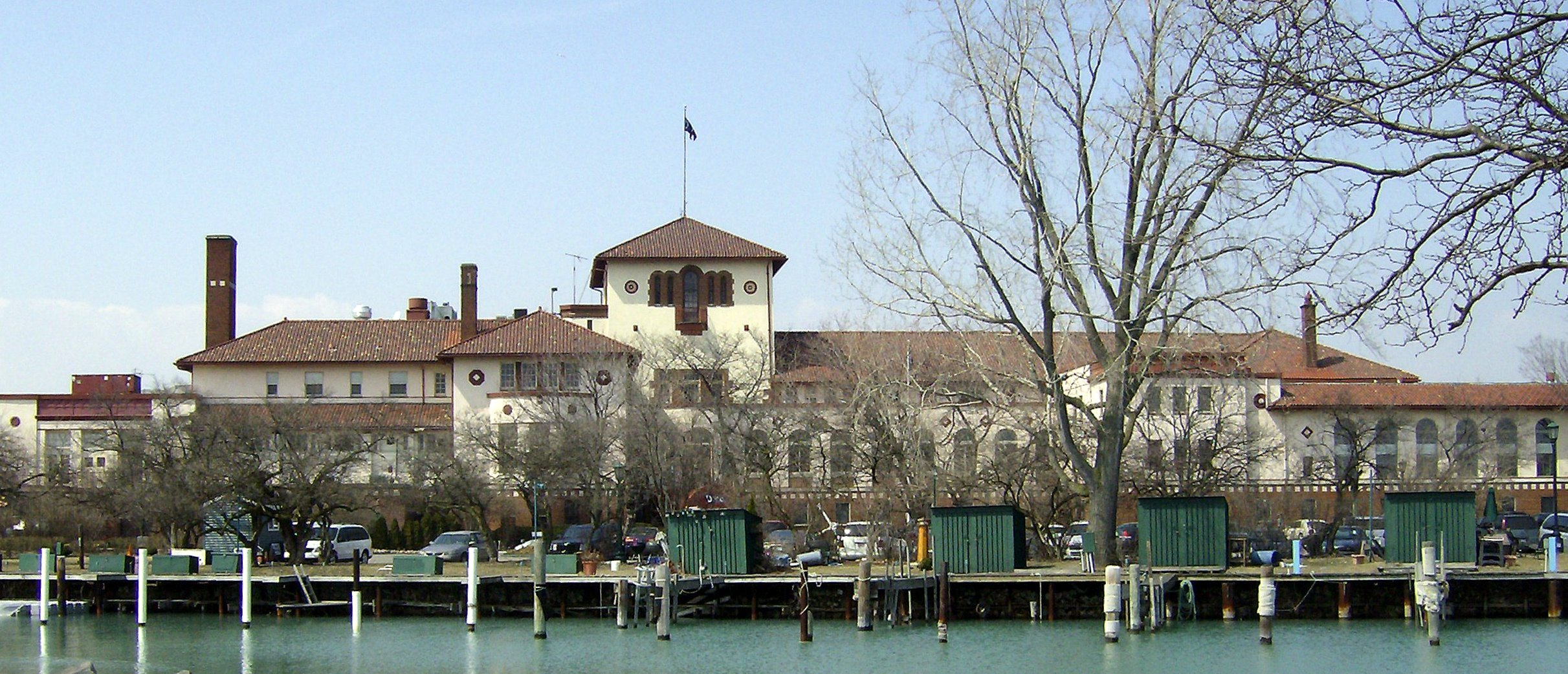
Detroit Yacht Club

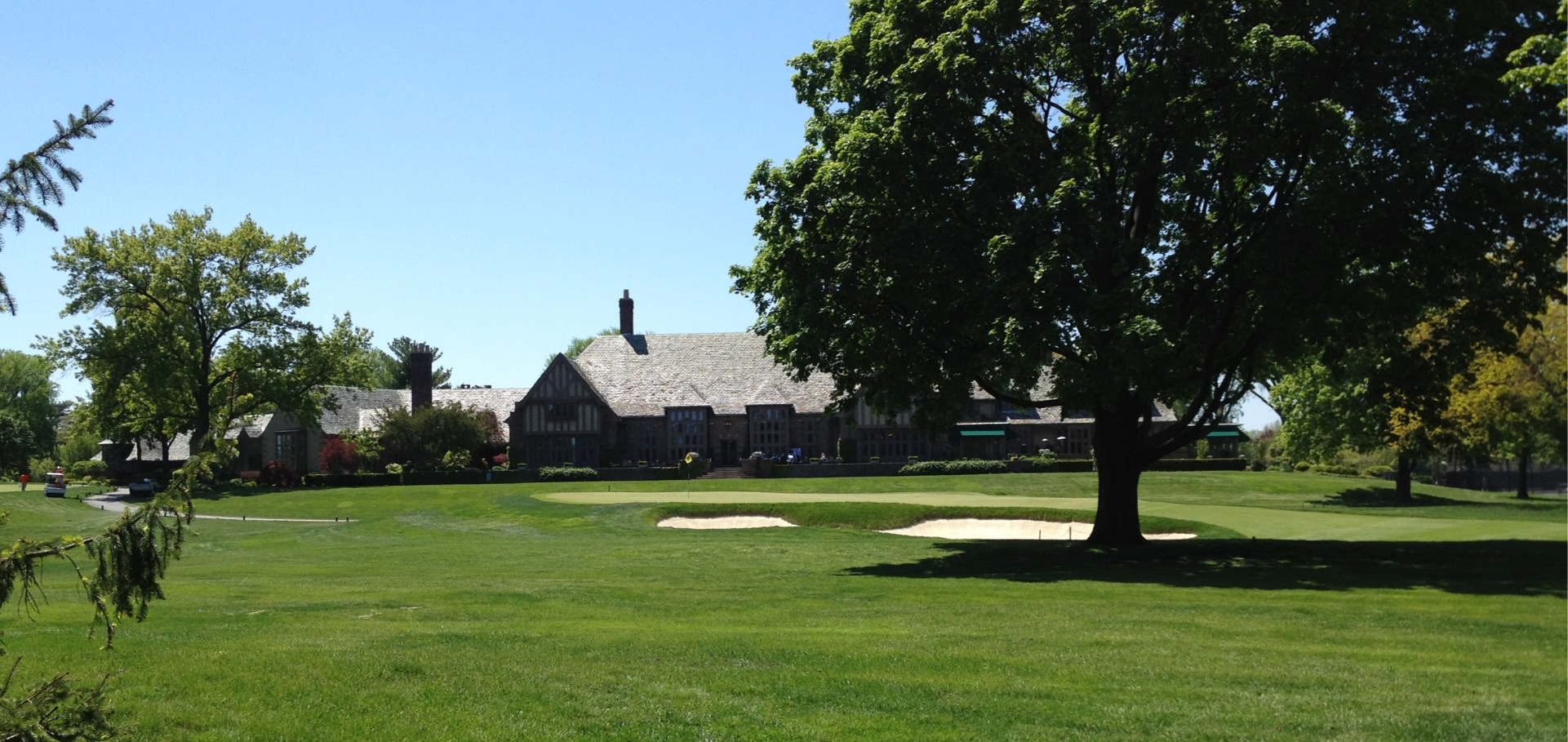
Country Club of Detroit

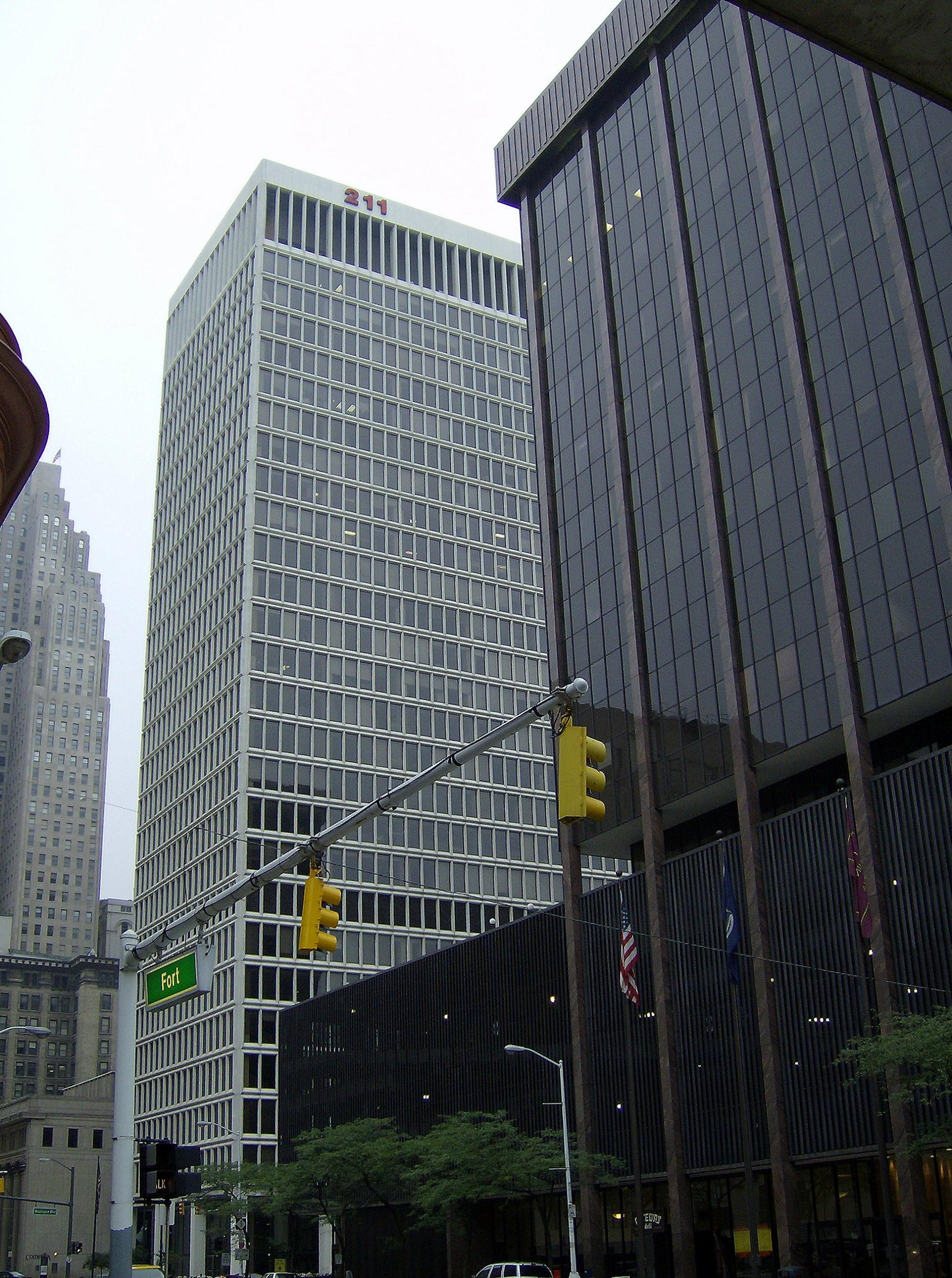
Since 1934, business leaders have belonged to the Detroit Economic Club.

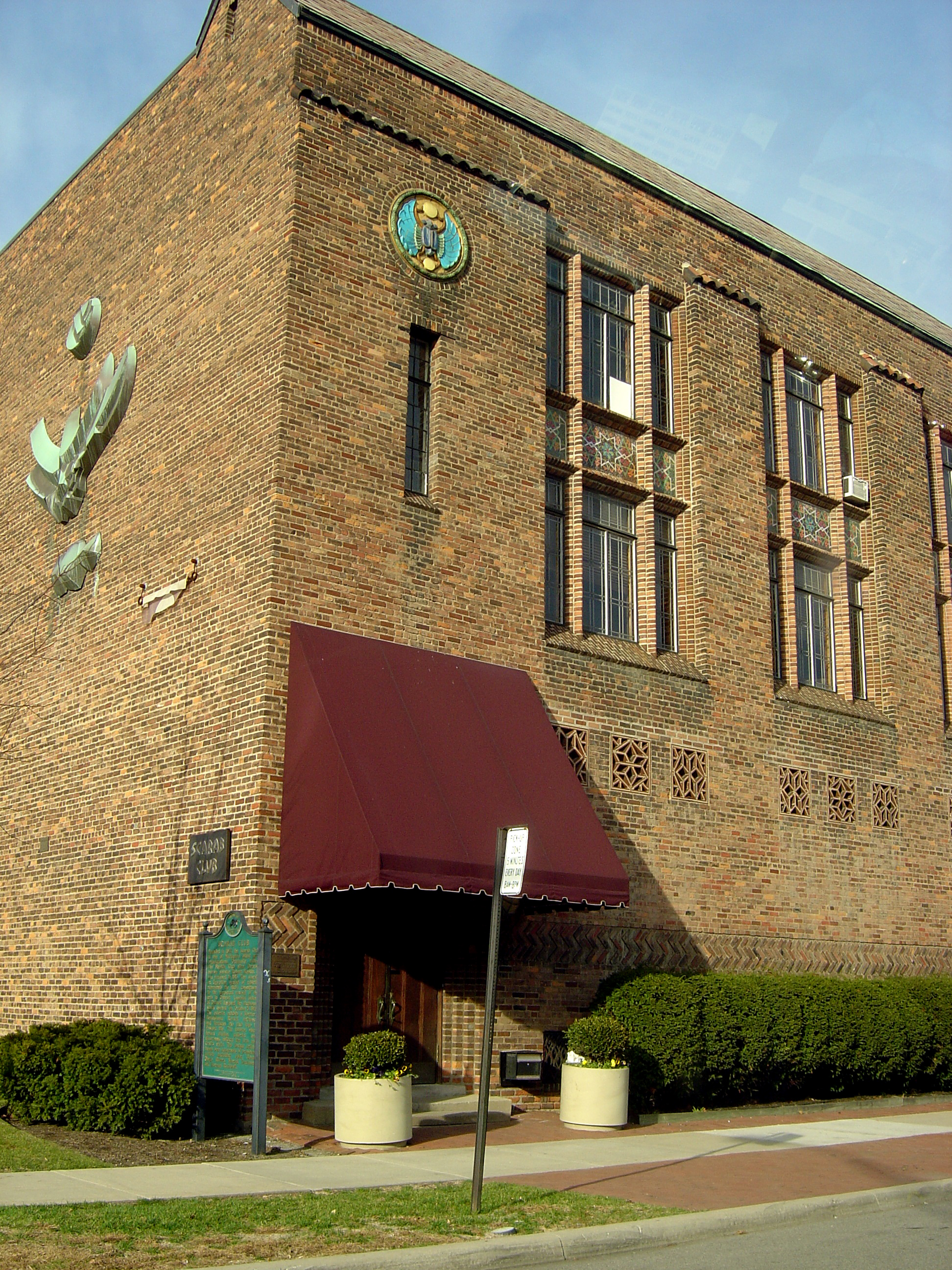
The Scarab Club is an artist's club, gallery, and studio.

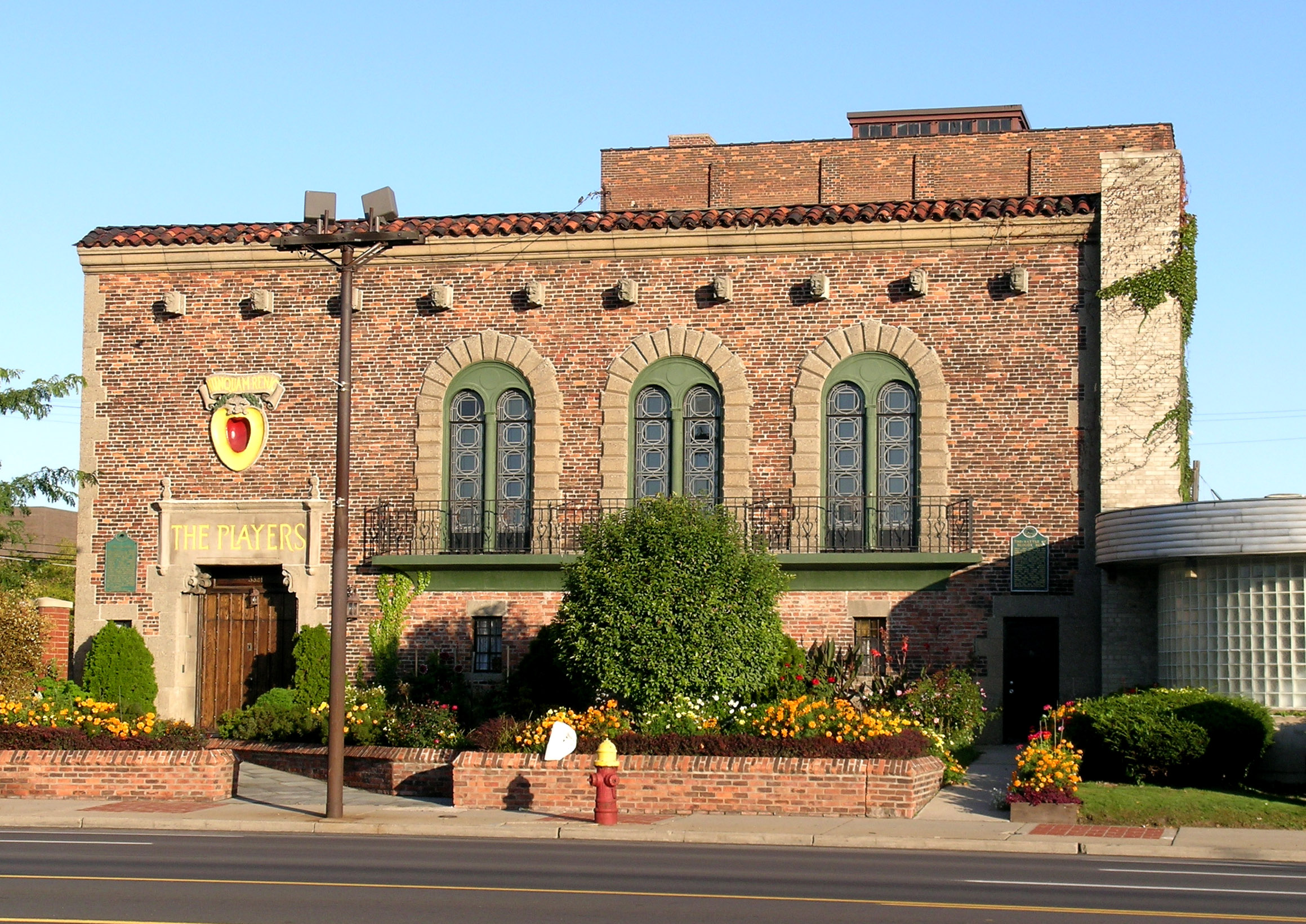
The Players clubhouse and theatre.

== Sister cities ==
Detroit has seven sister cities, as designated by Sister Cities International:

- Toyota, Japan
- Dubai, United Arab Emirates
- Turin, Italy
- Kitwe, Zambia
- Minsk, Belarus
- (The Bahamas) Nassau, Bahamas
- Chongqing, P.R. China

Detroit has a long and very close relationship with nearby (Canada) Windsor, Ontario.

== See also ==
- Detroit Historical Museum
- Detroit in literature
- List of films set in Detroit
- List of people from Detroit
- List of songs about Detroit
- Michigan History (magazine)
