= Stony Creek Metropark =

Park in Macomb County, Michigan, United States

- Location within Michigan Location within the United States
- Type: Regional park
- Location: Macomb County and Oakland County, Michigan, United States of America
- Coordinates: 42.72796°N 83.0844°W
- Area: 4,461 acres (1,805 ha)
- Operator: Huron–Clinton Metroparks
- Status: Open year round
- Website: Official site

Stony Creek Metropark is a Huron-Clinton Metropark located in southeast Michigan in the outskirts of metro Detroit. The park is predominantly in Washington Township and Oakland Township, with a small portion in Shelby Township. The park covers 4,461 acres (18.05 km^{2}) with Stony Creek Lake at its center.

== Geography ==
Stony Creek Lake is a man-made lake built by damming Stony Creek, a tributary of the Clinton River. Stony Creek drains 72 square miles (116 km^{2}) of northern Oakland County and the lake formed from the dams covers 500 acres (2.0 km^{2}).

Stony Creek Metropark is situated on a moraine which makes for varied landscape. The park has forests, hills, prairies, as well as swamps. The park is also relatively high above sea level, 875 feet (267 m) at the park office. Although a visitor can see downtown Detroit (26 miles away) from the park office, it is not the highest point in Macomb County, as many people believe. Trombley Mountain, located in the Ford Proving Grounds (Bruce Township), is 1,150 feet (350 m) above sea level - the highest point in Macomb County.

== Activities ==
Stony Creek has a vast amount of trails in four locations around the park. There are 14 miles (22.5 km) of mountain biking/hiking trails located on the grounds of a former estate, of which the foundations are still visible. There are another 8.5 miles (13.7 km) of hiking trails near the nature center, and over 6 miles (10 km) of foot trails near Inwood lake. Additionally, there is a 6-mile (10 km) paved trail that circles Stony Creek lake which is popular with joggers, and inline-skaters.

Stony Creek Metropark also has:

- A 6,981-yard (6,383 m), 18-hole golf course
- Snowboarding, sledding and tobogganing hills
- Two beaches on Stony Creek lake, Eastwood Beach and Baypoint Beach.
- Picnic areas with basketball courts, baseball fields, playgrounds, and beach volleyball courts
- Nature center
- Ice skating rink
- 15 miles of trails open to mountain biking
- 26-hole disc golf course
- Boat launch
- Rowboats, paddleboats, canoes, and kayaks available for rent
- Cross country skiing trails and ski rentals
- Trippo water slide

== Wildlife ==
The park is reestablishing an osprey population in south-eastern Michigan. There are also wild turkey, deer, bald eagles, and other animals one can expect in south-east Michigan in the park. Birding is encouraged with the nature center maintaining a species list. There have been massasaugas, Michigan's only venomous snake, spotted during the spring and summer months.
