= Detroit in literature =

Aspect of literature

The role of Detroit, Michigan, and in literature has been significantly discussed, including in academic works. The city and its suburbs, is the setting for a number of novels and short story collections, including:

- Louis-Ferdinand Céline, Voyage au bout de la nuit, 1932 (Journey to the End of the Night, 1934)
- Harriette Arnow, The Dollmaker 1954
- Rainelle Burton, The Root Worker, 2001
- Jim Daniels, Detroit Tales 2003
- Jeffrey Eugenides, The Virgin Suicides 1993 and Middlesex 2002
- Arthur Hailey, Wheels 1971
- Gary Hardwick, The Executioner's Game 2005
- William X. Kienzle, The Rosary Murders 1979
- Elmore Leonard, City Primeval: Detroit at High Noon 1980
- Joyce Carol Oates, them 1968
- Harold Robbins, The Betsy 1971
- James O'Barr, The Crow 1981
- Marge Piercy, "Braided Lives"
- Patrick O'Leary, Door Number Three 1995
- Jeffry Scott Hansen Warpath 2003
- Paul Clemens, Made in Detroit 2005
- Alexander C. Irvine, The Narrows 2005
- Joe Borri, Eight Dogs Named Jack 2007
- Frank Anthony Polito, Band Fags! 2008
- Michael Zadoorian, Second Hand 2000, The Lost Tiki Palaces of Detroit 2009, Beautiful Music 2018 and The Narcissism of Small Differences 2020
