= Detroit Fashion Week =

Fashion industry convention

- Status: Inactive
- Inaugurated: 2005
- Most recent: 2019

Detroit Fashion Week is a week-long event that presents Michigan clothing designers and showcases modeling talent in the Metro Detroit region. Founded and produced by Brian Heath in 2005, the garment industry in Detroit observed fashion week from Monday, August 8, 2005 to Saturday, August 13, 2005, with fringe events that were open on Sunday, August 14, 2005, including a trunk show. Almost all events occurred at the 4731 Gallery, named for its street address at 4731 Grand River Avenue. The fourth floor of the 4731 building housed the runway events. Detroit Fashion Week 2007 was held at the Hotel St. Regis. The annual event has been held annually in and around the city of Detroit and has had designers from across the United States as well as models from major agencies and Americas Next Top Model participant Bianca Golden.

Detroit Fashion Week since 2013 is produced by The Main Event20 and under new ownership. Detroit Fashion Week also sponsors two events, one summer and one winter event that involves a fashion show. This fashion show concludes the MAIN( MotorCity Automotive Industry Night) Event awards ceremony for automotive designers. The winter event takes place at Detroit Orchestra Hall and the summer event takes place on the campus of Lawrence Technological Institute. The event has been inactive since 2019.
