= List of films set in Detroit =

Detroit, Michigan in the United States, has been used as a setting and/or filming location for many Hollywood feature films, as well as several television series:

- 17000 Block, Curtis Franklin. 2005. Theo Williamson, Walter Harris, Rebecca Dawn.
- 61*, Billy Crystal. 2001. Barry Pepper, Thomas Jane, Anthony Michael Hall This baseball film was set in New York but largely filmed in Detroit, with a digitally altered Tiger Stadium used to simulate Yankee Stadium.
- 8 Mile, Curtis Hanson. 2002. Eminem, Kim Basinger, Brittany Murphy, Mekhi Phifer.
- 8 Simple Rules for Dating My Teenage Daughter (TV). 2002–2005.
- Action Jackson, Craig R. Baxley. 1988. Carl Weathers, Craig T. Nelson, Sharon Stone.
- Assault on Precinct 13 2005 Set in Detroit but filmed in Toronto.
- Barbarian, Zach Cregger, 2022. Georgina Campbell, Bill Skarsgård, Justin Long.
- Batman v Superman: Dawn of Justice, Zack Snyder, 2016. Ben Affleck, Henry Cavill, Amy Adams.
- The Betsy, Daniel Petrie. 1978. Laurence Olivier, Robert Duvall, Katharine Ross, Tommy Lee Jones.
- Beverly Hills Cop, Martin Brest. 1984. Eddie Murphy, Judge Reinhold, Ronny Cox. (#1 film in U.S)
- Bird on a Wire, 1990.
- Blue Collar, Paul Schrader. 1978. Richard Pryor, Harvey Keitel, Yaphet Kotto.
- Brother Future, 1991.
- The Butterfly Effect 3: Revelations, Seth Grossman. 2009. Chris Carmack, Rachel Miner. Set and filmed mostly in Detroit.
- Chameleon Street, Wendell B. Harris. 1989.
- Collision Course, Lewis Teague. 1989. Jay Leno, Pat Morita.
- CornerStore, Joseph Doughrity. 2011.
- Crossing the Bridge, Mike Binder. 1992. Josh Charles, Jason Gedrick, Stephen Baldwin.
- The Crow, Alex Proyas. 1994. Brandon Lee, Rochelle Davis, Ernie Hudson. Although story is set in Detroit, production took place in North Carolina.
- Darkman, Sam Raimi, 1990.
- Detroit 1-8-7 (TV). Michael Imperioli. 2010. David Zabel, Executive Producer.
- Detroit 9000, Arthur Marks. 1973. Hari Rhodes, Alex Rocco.
- Detroit (film), Kathryn Bigelow. 2017. Although set in Detroit principal photography took place in Boston, Massachusetts with later scenes shot at the Fox Theater (Detroit).
- Detroit Rock City. Shot mostly in Toronto, only part of the movie was shot in Detroit, the Fox Theatre and a few other areas of Woodward Ave were shot in Detroit. The skyline of Detroit was shot from Windsor, Canada. 1999.
- Don't Breathe. 2016 (#1 film in U.S.)
- Dreamgirls, Bill Condon. 2006. Jamie Foxx, Beyoncé Knowles, Jennifer Hudson.
- Eternal Torture, Pete Peter, Pam. 2013.
- Evil Dead, Sam Raimi. 1981. Bruce Campbell, Ellen Sandweiss.
- Exit Wounds. 2001. Although story is set in Detroit, production took place mostly in Canada.
- Flash of Genius, Greg Kinnear, 2008.
- For Love of the Game, Kevin Costner. 1999. Film about Detroit Tigers Pitcher pitching a perfect game in Yankee Stadium.
- Four Brothers, John Singleton. 2005. Mark Wahlberg, André 3000, Tyrese Gibson, Garrett Hedlund/ Although story is set in Detroit, production took place mostly in Toronto.
- Freaks and Geeks (TV). Seth Rogen, Jason Segel, James Franco, Busy Philipps, Linda Cardellini and John Francis Daley. 1999. Judd Apatow, Executive Producer.
- The Giant Mechanical Man: Jenna Fischer, Chris Messina, Malin Akerman, Rich Sommer, Lucy Punch. The two main characters work at the Detroit Zoo.
- Gran Torino, Clint Eastwood. 2008. Brian Haley, John Carroll Lynch. Set in and filmed in the Detroit area including the cities of Center Line, Royal Oak, Highland Park and Grosse Pointe. (#1 film)
- Gridlock'd. 1997.
- Grosse Pointe Blank, George Armitage 1997. John Cusack, Minnie Driver, Alan Arkin, Dan Aykroyd, Joan Cusack, Hank Azaria, K. Todd Freeman, Jeremy Piven. Set in Grosse Pointe.
- Hoffa, Danny DeVito. 1992. Jack Nicholson, Danny DeVito, Armand Assante.
- Home Improvement (TV). 1991–1999. set in Royal Oak, Michigan, a suburb of Detroit.
- Home Run Showdown, Oz Scott. 2015. Matthew Lillard, Dean Cain, Annabeth Gish, Barry Bostwick, Wayne Duvall.
- The Island, Michael Bay. 2005. Ewan McGregor, Scarlett Johansson Scenes shot in Downtown Detroit.
- It Follows, David Robert Mitchell. 2014. Maika Monroe.
- Jimmy B. & Andre (TV). Guy Green. 1980. Alex Karras, Curtis Yates.
- Lost River, Ryan Gosling. 2015. Christina Hendricks, Saoirse Ronan, Iain De Caestecker, Matt Smith, Eva Mendes, Ben Mendelsohn. Filmed in Detroit, and possibly set in a surreal version of the city although this is never explicit.
- Low Winter Sun (TV). 2013. Mark Strong, Lennie James. Originally a British miniseries, the American remake is set, and was filmed, in Detroit.
- The Man, 2005. Samuel L. Jackson, Eugene Levy. Set in Detroit but filmed in Ontario, Canada.
- Martin (TV). 1992–1997.
- Miami Cops, Alfonso Brescia. 1989. Richard Roundtree, Harrison Muller Jr. Despite the title the first part is set/partially filmed in Detroit.
- Mickey One, Arthur Penn. 1965. Warren Beatty.
- Motor City, Potsy Ponciroli. 2025. Alan Ritchson, Ben Foster, Pablo Schreiber, Lionel Boyce, Shailene Woodley.
- Mr. Mom, Stan Dragoti. 1983. Michael Keaton, Teri Garr, Jeffrey Tambor, Ann Jillian, Christopher Lloyd, Martin Mull.
- My Life, Bruce Joel Rubin. 1993 Michael Keaton, Nicole Kidman.
- Naked Angel. Shot in a combination of Ann Arbor, Michigan and Detroit.
- Narc. 2002.
- No Sudden Move, Steven Soderbergh. 2021. Don Cheadle, Benicio del Toro, David Harbour, Jon Hamm.
- Only Lovers Left Alive, Jim Jarmusch. 2013. Tilda Swinton, Tom Hiddleston, Mia Wasikowska, Anton Yelchin.
- Out of Sight, Steven Soderbergh. 1998. George Clooney, Jennifer Lopez, Ving Rhames.
- Paper Lion, Alex March. 1968. Alan Alda, Alex Karras.
- The PJ's (TV). 1999–2001. Set in Detroit's Brewster-Douglass Housing Projects.
- Polish Wedding, Theresa Connelly. 1998. Claire Danes, Lena Olin, Gabriel Byrne.
- Presumed Innocent, Alan J. Pakula. 1990. Harrison Ford, Brian Dennehy, Raul Julia.
- Private Parts, Betty Thomas. 1997. Howard Stern, Robin Quivers, Mary McCormack.
- Project 313, Jay Anthony White. 2006. David Craze, William Bennett, Big Herk.
- Real Steel Shawn Levy. 2011. Hugh Jackman.
- Red Dawn Remake filmed in Detroit and surrounding cities.
- Renaissance Man, Penny Marshall. 1994. Danny DeVito, Gregory Hines.
- RoboCop, Paul Verhoeven. 1987. Peter Weller, Nancy Allen. Though set in Detroit, with fly-overs filmed there, the majority of the movie was filmed in Dallas, Texas with additional filming in Las Colinas and Pittsburgh. (#1 film)

- RoboCop 2 1990. Mostly filmed in Houston. The Harley Davidson scene was shot in Los Angeles.
- RoboCop 3 1993. Mostly filmed in Atlanta.
- RoboCop. 2014. Set in Detroit, but mountains in the trailer background reveal the movie was filmed partially in Vancouver.

- The Rosary Murders, Fred Walton. 1987. Donald Sutherland, Charles Durning.
- Scarecrow, Jerry Schatzberg. 1973. Gene Hackman, Al Pacino.
- Scream 4 2011. Scenes shot in Ann Arbor, Plymouth and Northville; also Woodworth Middle School in Dearborn.
- Semi-Pro 2008. Scenes at the Michigan State Fairgrounds
- Sister, Sister (TV). 1994–1999. Set in the Detroit suburb of Dearborn.
- Star Trek: Enterprise episode "Carpenter Street". Set in Detroit, but mountains and palm tree in background reveal the episode was filmed in L.A.
- SWAT: Firefight (2010). Gabriel Macht, Carly Pope, Robert Patrick, Giancarlo Esposito. An LAPD SWAT commander is assigned to train the Detroit police SWAT team to get the team certified in the latest FBI HRT tactics. The first 10 minutes are set in L.A., but the rest of the movie is set in Detroit.
- Tiger Town (TV), Alan Shapiro. 1983. Roy Scheider, Justin Henry.
- Transformers 2007. Scenes of the monumental Michigan Central Station. (#1 film in U.S.)
- Traveling Husbands. 1931. An American comedy film directed by Paul Sloane and starring Evelyn Brent.
- True Romance, Tony Scott. 1993. Christian Slater, Patricia Arquette, Dennis Hopper. The opening industrial scenes of the Ford Rouge plant and Cass Corridor, the Drexl scenes, the Sicilian Scene (exteriors only) and the wedding scene where Clarence and Alabama walk down the steps of the Courthouse are shot in Detroit. The rest was shot in L.A.
- The Upside of Anger, Mike Binder. 2005. Joan Allen, Kevin Costner, Erika Christensen.
- Vanishing on 7th Street. 2011. Hayden Christensen, Thandie Newton and John Leguizamo Street scenes shot at the Russell Industrial Center. Church interiors shot at St. Albertus Roman Catholic Church
- The Virgin Suicides, 1999.
- Whip It. Scenes feature the Lafayette Coney Island and Ferndale High School.
- Zebrahead, Anthony Drazan. 1992. Michael Rapaport, Kevin Corrigan, N'Bushe Wright.
- Coffee & Kareem *, 2020. Ed Helms, Taraji P. Henson, Terrence Little Gardenhigh
- Brick Mansions, 2014 action film starring Paul Walker, David Belle, RZA
- Transformers: The Last Knight, 2017 Mark Wahlberg; Josh Duhamel; Stanley Tucci; Anthony Hopkins. A scene was filmed in the pool of Waterford Mott Highschool and the Pontiac Silverdome
