= Detroit International Riverfront =

Area of Detroit, Michigan that borders the Detroit River

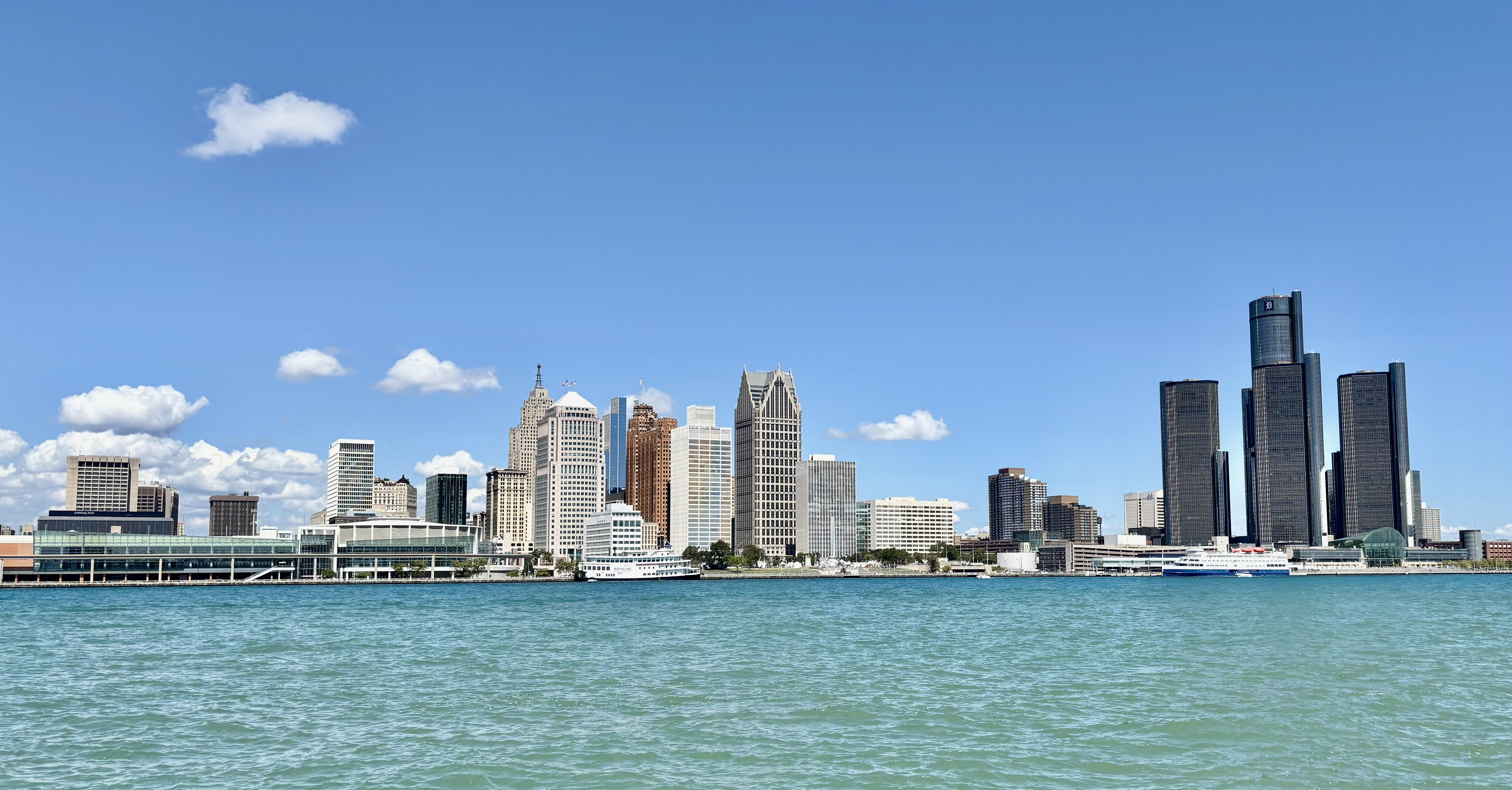
Skyline of Detroit, September 2025

The Detroit International Riverfront is a tourist attraction and landmark of Detroit, Michigan, extending from the Ambassador Bridge in the west to Belle Isle in the east, for a total of 5.5 miles (8.8 kilometers) along the Detroit River. The International Riverfront encompasses a cruise ship passenger terminal and dock, a marina, a multitude of parks, restaurants, retail shops, skyscrapers, and high rise residential areas along with Huntington Place. The Marriott at the Renaissance Center and the Robert's Riverwalk Hotel are also situated along the International Riverfront.

Private companies and foundations together with the city, state, and federal government have contributed several hundred million dollars toward the riverfront development. Key public spaces in the International Riverfront, such as the RiverWalk, Dequindre Cut Greenway and Trail, William G. Milliken State Park and Harbor, and a cruise ship passenger terminal and dock at Hart Plaza complement the architecture of the area. The area provides a venue for a variety of annual events and festivals including the Detroit Electronic Music Festival, Detroit Free Press International Marathon, the Detroit International Jazz Festival, Motor City Pride, the North American International Auto Show, River Days and Detroit China Festival.

In February 2021, the Detroit International Riverfront was voted best riverwalk in the United States by USA Today readers. It was selected for this award again in 2022 and 2023, marking three consecutive years.

== History ==
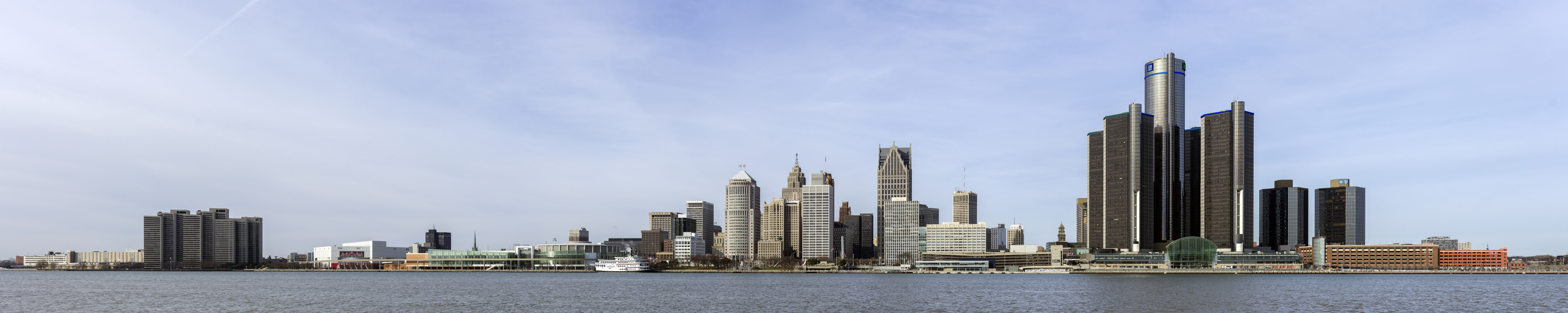
Panorama of the Detroit International Riverfront

In 1981, the City of Detroit purchased the site from Uniroyal for $5 million and then spent another $3.6 million to demolish structures and clear the site.

The Detroit Riverfront Conservancy, incorporated as a 501(c)(3) organization, helped raise funds for the International Riverfront project. Developers planned the initial east riverfront promenade investment at $559 million, which included contributions of $135 million from GM and $50 million from the Kresge foundation.

== Features ==
The area contains the Detroit River International Wildlife Refuge which is the only international wildlife preserve in North America, uniquely located in the heart of a major metropolitan area. The Refuge includes islands, coastal wetlands, marshes, shoals, and waterfront lands along 48 miles (77 km) of the Detroit River and Western Lake Erie shoreline.

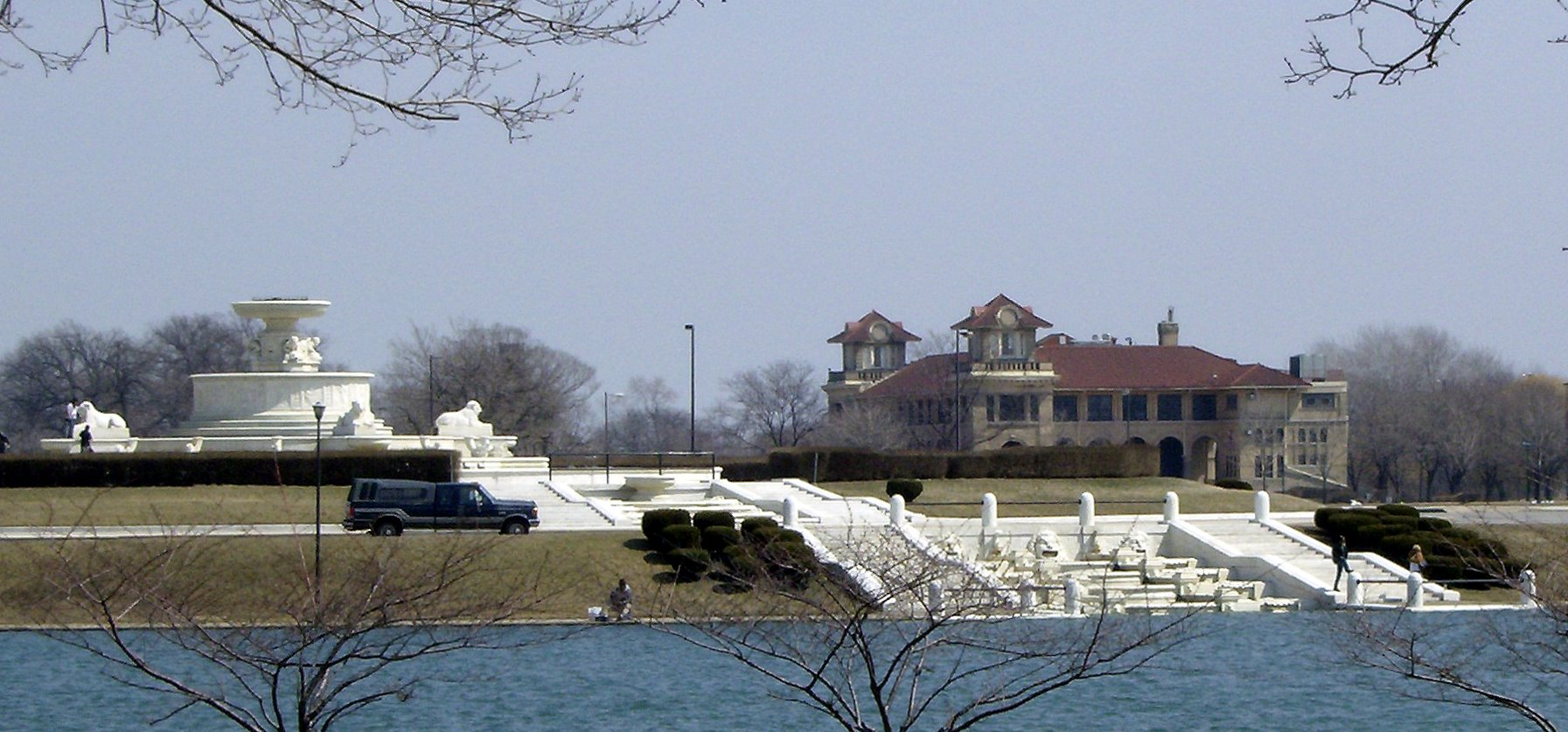
James Scott Fountain and Belle Isle Casino

=== Belle Isle Park ===
Belle Isle Park is a 982 acres (397 ha; 1.534 sq mi) island state park in the Detroit River managed by the State of Michigan. Until November 12, 2013, it was a city-operated park operated by the City of Detroit Recreation Department. It connects to the city by the MacArthur Bridge. It is home to the Anna Scripps Whitcomb Conservatory (1904), the oldest conservatory in the United States, the Detroit Yacht Club, the Detroit Boat Club, the Dossin Great Lakes Museum, a Coast Guard post, and a municipal golf course. The park contains a Nature Center where visitors are able to traverse wooded trails and view wildlife natural habitats. The island includes a half-mile (800 m) swimming beach.

=== Aretha Franklin Amphitheater ===
Aretha Franklin Amphitheater
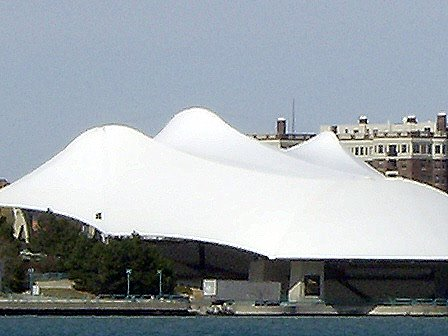
- Aretha Franklin Amphitheater
- Interactive map of Aretha Franklin Amphitheater
- Type: Municipal
- Location: 2600 Atwater St., Detroit
- Coordinates: 42°20′1.89″N 83°1′17.14″W
- Public transit: DDOT 9, 67

The Aretha Franklin Amphitheater, formerly known as Chene Park, is located on the near east side of Detroit, at the foot of Chene Street, along the banks of the Detroit River. Located just east of William G. Milliken State Park and Harbor, it contains a 6,000-seat amphitheater where concerts are regularly scheduled every summer. Jazz, Classic Soul and Rhythm and Blues acts are the staples of the season. The park also includes park trails, the Chene Park Fountain, and the Lake Lounge bar. The Detroit Riverfront Conservancy has connected the park to the Renaissance Center along a riverside promenade.

The park was originally named for Charles Chene, a French immigrant who owned a strip of land along the shores of the Detroit River that extended into what is now just east of downtown. On September 4, 2018, Detroit City Council unanimously voted to rename Chene Park the Aretha Franklin Amphitheater after the famous singer who died on August 16, 2018. The change took place before the 2019 season.

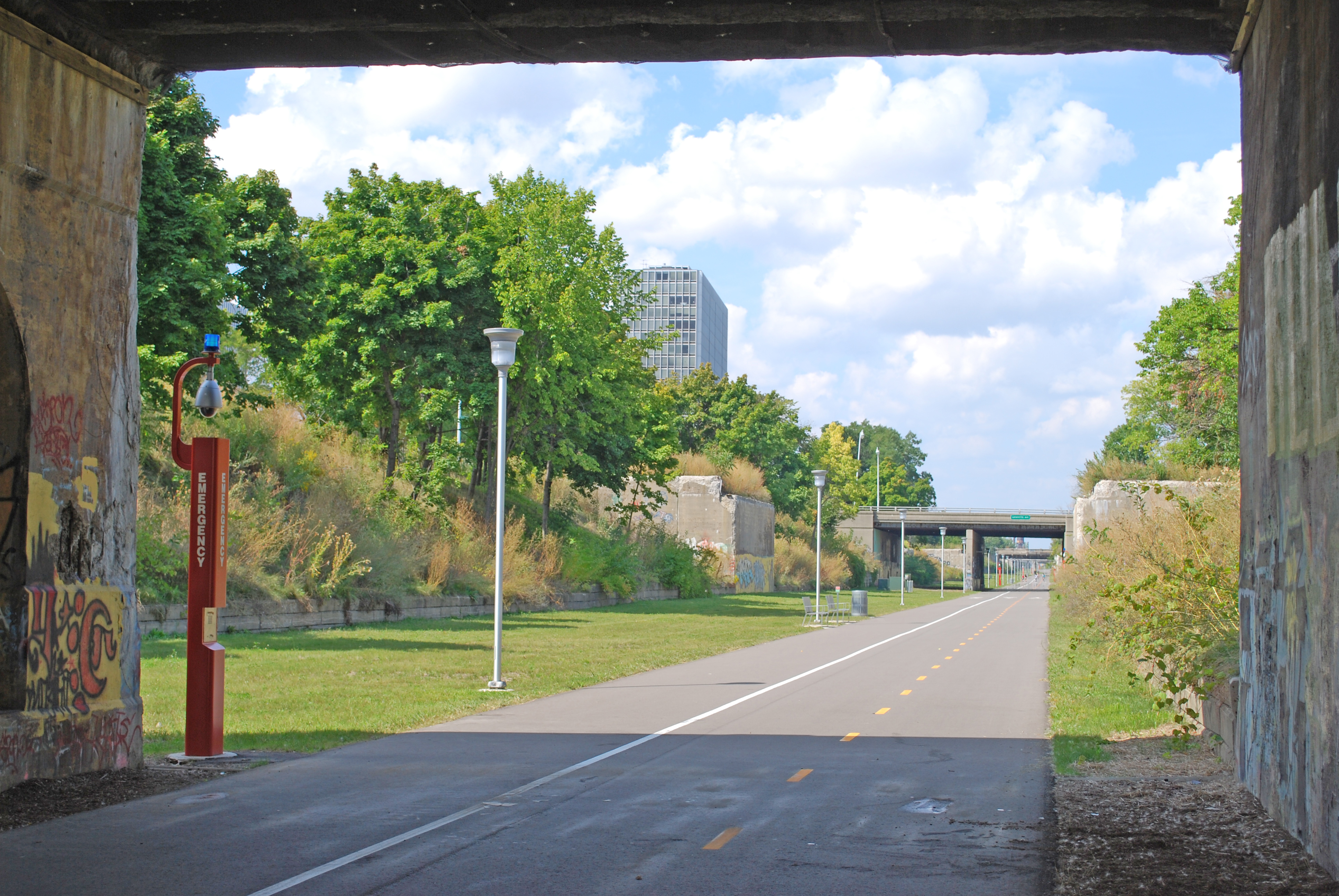
Dequindre Cut Greenway looking north

=== Dequindre Cut Greenway ===
Dequindre Cut Greenway is a non-motorized trail extending from the Detroit River northward, with the future potential to connect to the Ferndale-Birmingham greenway in Oakland County. The mile (1.6 km) long trail primarily connects the Lafayette Park neighborhood and Eastern Market to the Riverwalk. The greenway utilizes half of the corridor, with a 20-foot (6.1 m) wide paved path with separate lanes for biking and walking.

Construction of phase I of the Dequindre Cut Greenway, extending from the River one mile (1.6 km) north to Gratiot Avenue, is complete. Funded by MDOT's Transportation Enhancement Program and the Community Foundation of Southeast Michigan, this portion of the greenway sets the template for future phases and includes a 20-foot (6.1 m) bituminous path; access ramps for bicyclists, pedestrians and emergency vehicles; landscaping; lighting; signage and security cameras. The first phase of the trail officially opened May 14, 2009 with an opening ribbon-cutting ceremony at the Woodbridge Street entrance of the greenway between Orleans Street and St. Aubin Street.

The Dequindre Cut Greenway phase II North project begins at the northern terminus of the phase I at Gratiot Avenue and continues for over one-half mile to Mack Avenue. The strategic plan for phase II provides a design approach and project budget that builds on the lessons learned in phase I construction.

The Dequindre Cut is noted for the high quality graffiti covering the walls of the corridor. The Riverfront Conservancy which operates the greenway will permit current and future painted art work to remain as long as it is not deemed offensive. The trail is one of the city's few public art parks and is a major attraction for urban photographers.

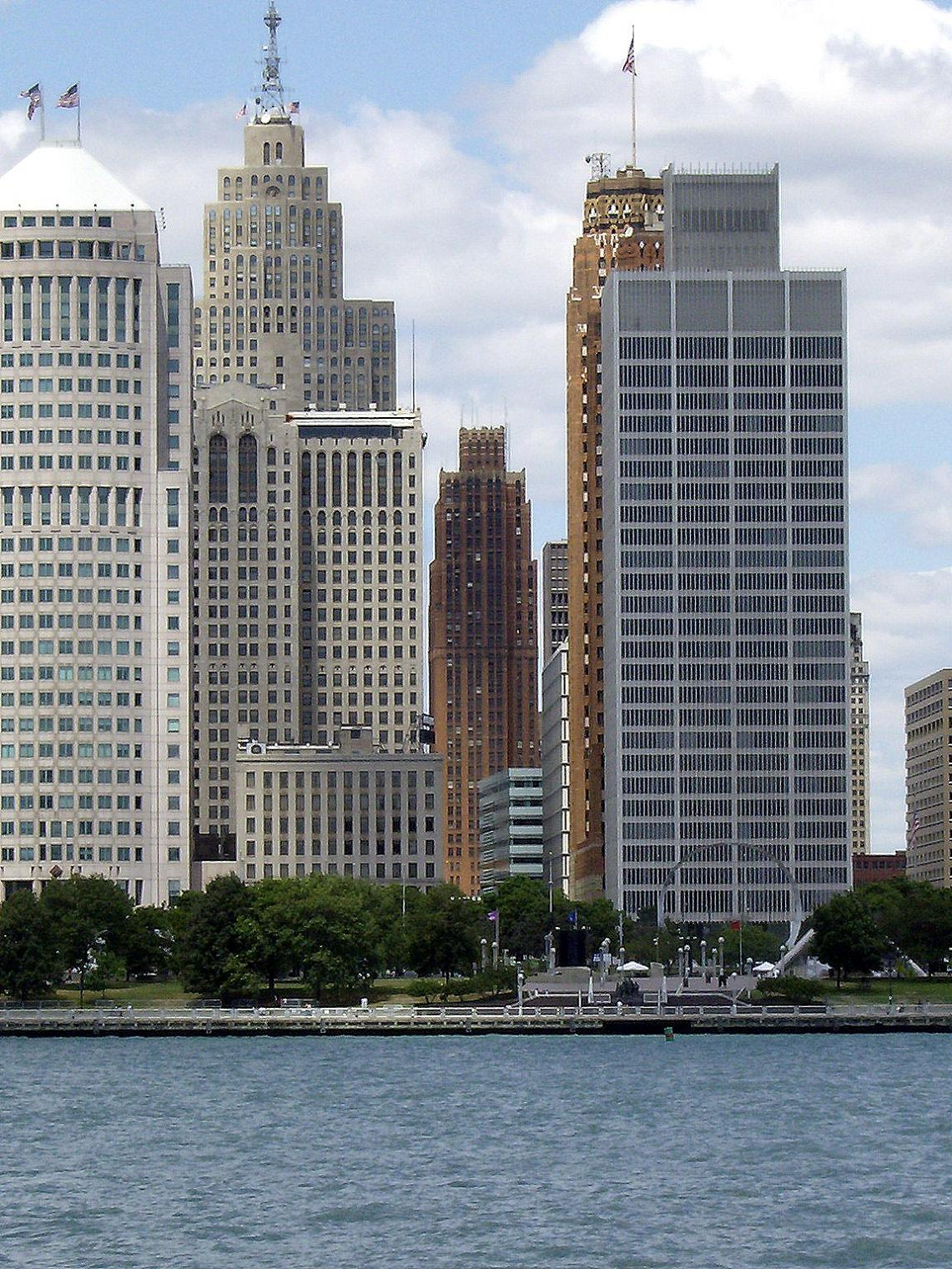
Detroit Financial District skyline at Hart Plaza

=== GM Plaza and Promenade ===
The Renaissance Center, nicknamed the RenCen, is a group of seven interconnected skyscrapers in Detroit, Michigan, and the tallest building in Michigan since 1977. Located on the Detroit International Riverfront, the entire Renaissance Center complex is owned by General Motors. The central tower is occupied by the Detroit Marriott at the Renaissance Center, the tallest all-hotel skyscraper in the Western Hemisphere with the largest rooftop restaurant, called Coach Insignia. The complex contains many restaurants, a variety of shops, and the vehicle display known as GM World. GM donated its portion of the plaza and promenade to the Riverfront Conservancy upon completion. A cruise-ship passenger terminal stands on Hart Plaza, adjacent to the Renaissance Center. In 2003, General Motors completed a $500 million renovation of the Renaissance Center for its world headquarters which it had purchased in 1996. Skidmore, Owings & Merrill, Gensler, the Smith Group, and Ghafari Associates were among the architects for the renovation. The majority of the construction operations were led by Turner Construction Company. The renovation included the addition of a five-story Wintergarden which provides access to the Detroit International Riverfront.

Work continued in and around the complex until 2005. The Renaissance Center totals 5.5 million square feet (511,000 m^{2}), making it one of the world's largest office complexes.

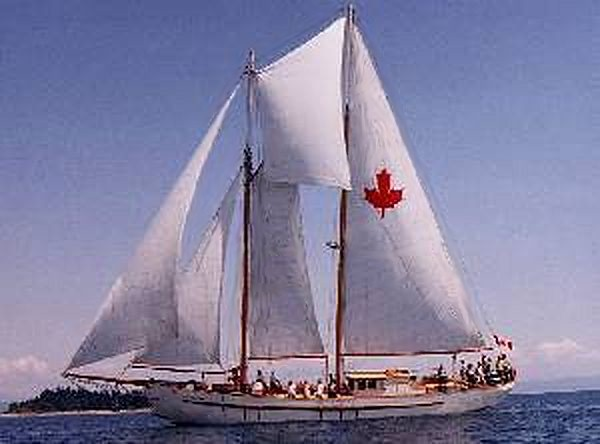
Tall ships occasionally dock in Detroit.

=== Hart Plaza and the Dock of Detroit ===
Philip A. Hart Plaza in downtown Detroit, is a city plaza along the Detroit River. It is located more or less on the site at which Antoine de la Mothe Cadillac landed in 1701 when he founded Fort Pontchartrain du Détroit, the settlement that became Detroit. In 2011, the Detroit-Wayne County Port Authority opened its new cruise ship passenger terminal and dock at Hart Plaza, adjacent to the Renaissance Center, which receives major cruise ships such as the MS Columbus and the Yorktown.

The 14-acre (5.7 ha) plaza, which is named for the late U.S. Senator Philip Hart, opened in 1975 and has a capacity for about 40,000 people. At the center of the plaza is the Horace E. Dodge and Son Memorial Fountain, designed by Isamu Noguchi and Walter Budd in 1978.

=== Ralph C. Wilson, Jr. Centennial Park ===
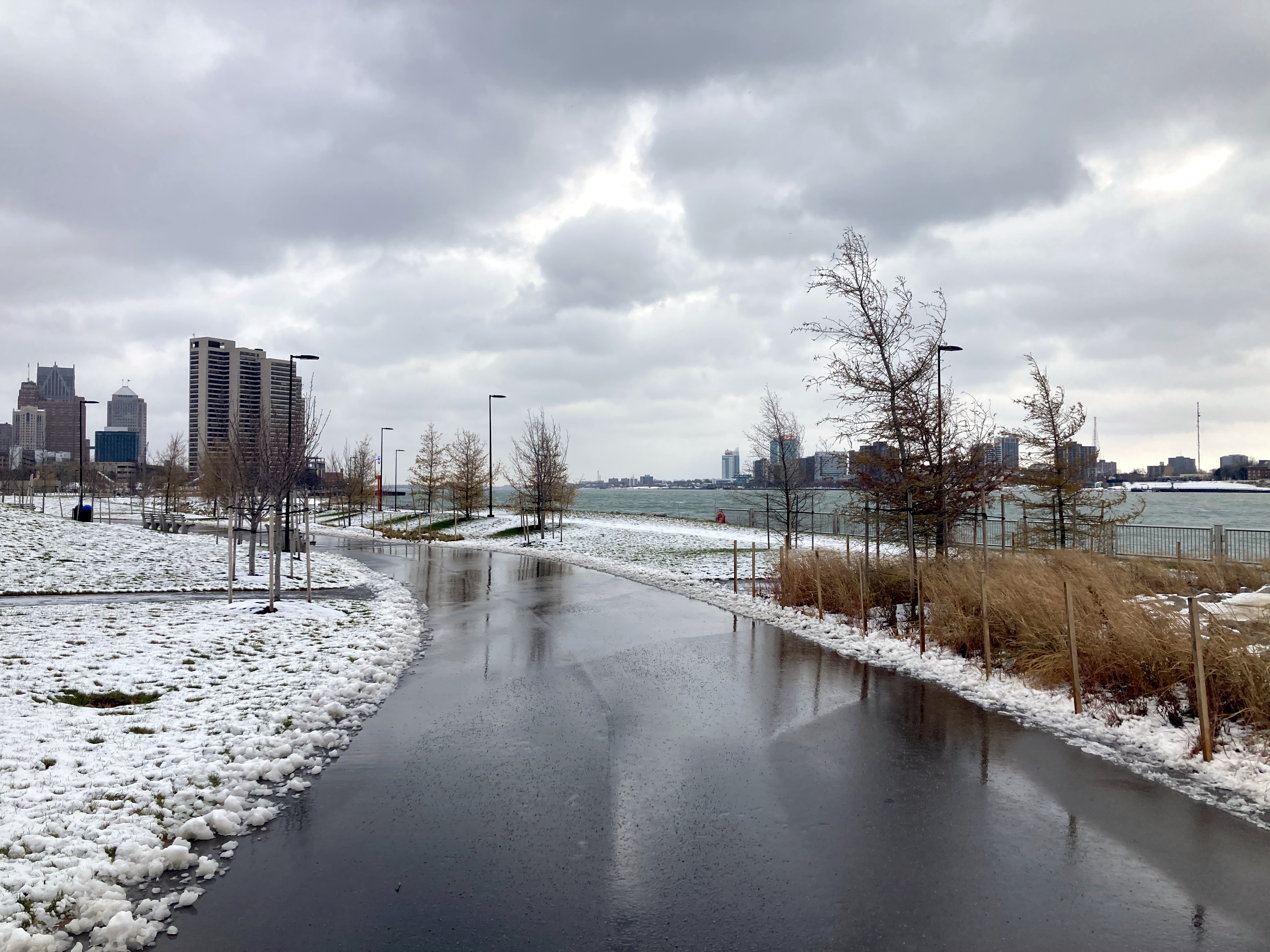
The Ralph C. Wilson, Jr. Centennial Park in Nov. 2025

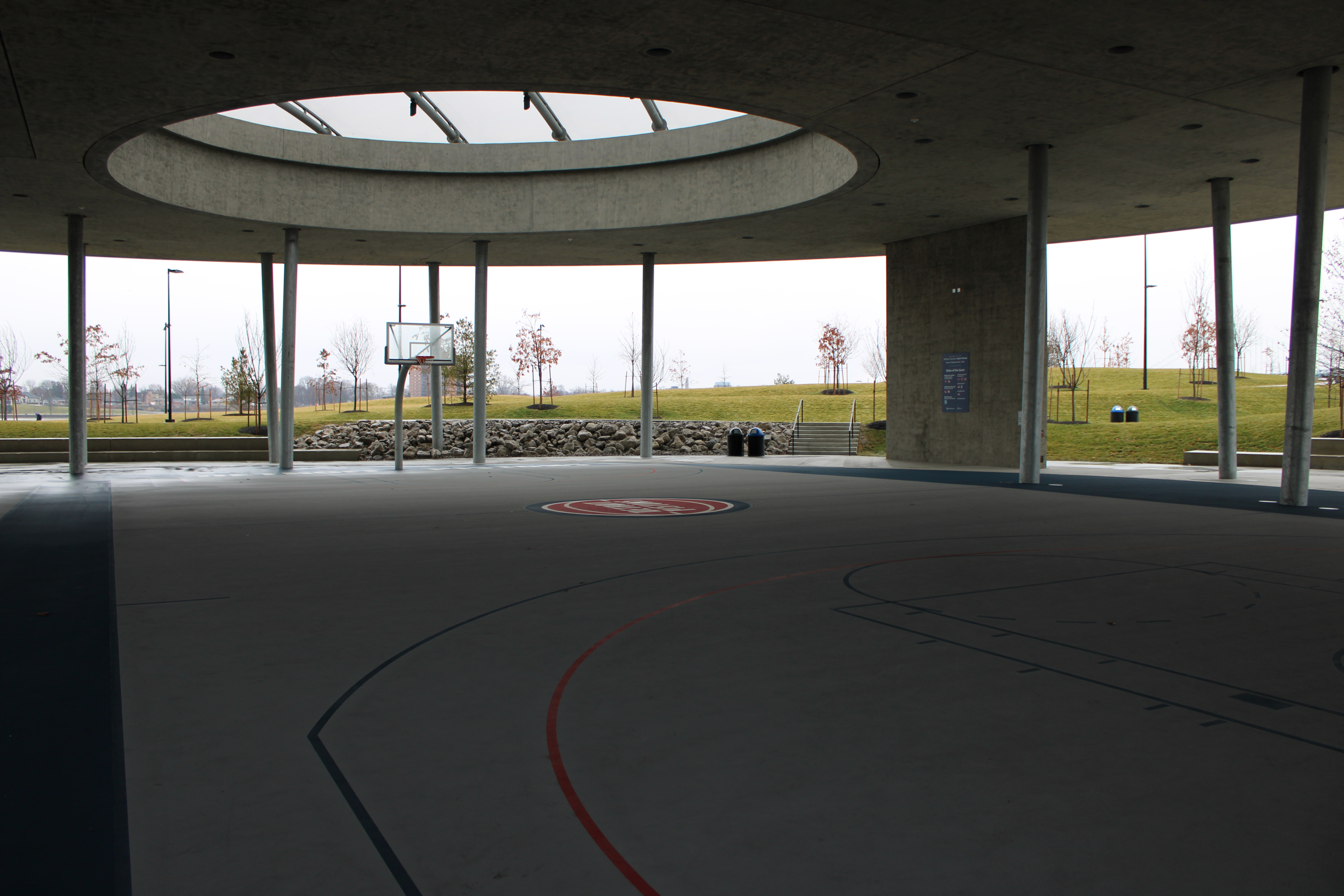
The William Davidson Sport House in December 2025

The Ralph C. Wilson, Jr. Centennial Park is a 22-acre (8.9 ha) regional park located on the former West Riverfront Park grounds at the far western end of the Riverwalk. The park features a 20-foot (6.1 m) bear-shaped slide, large-animal themed play structures, a water garden, public grills, green space, and panoramic views of the Detroit River, Ambassador Bridge, and the Gordie Howe International Bridge. It has a direct non motorized connection with Michigan Central Station via the Southwest Greenway.

The Huron–Clinton Metroparks Water Garden within the park is a 2.5-acre (1.0 ha) water garden providing a pebble beach and walking paths. The water garden is Metropark's first presence within the city of Detroit.

The William Davidson Sport House at the park is a giant covered pavilion over two NBA regulation-sized Detroit Pistons themed basketball courts. The courts plan to be open year-round.

The park opened to the public on October 25, 2025.

=== River Place ===
The historic Stroh River Place complex is a mixed-use residential development adjacent to the Roberts Riverwalk Hotel and Residence, the redeveloped site of the Parke-Davis research laboratory, a National Historic Landmark located along the east riverfront promenade. The historic Dry Dock Complex is an additional redeveloped site along the east riverfront which includes residential units and retail.

=== River Walk ===
River Walk
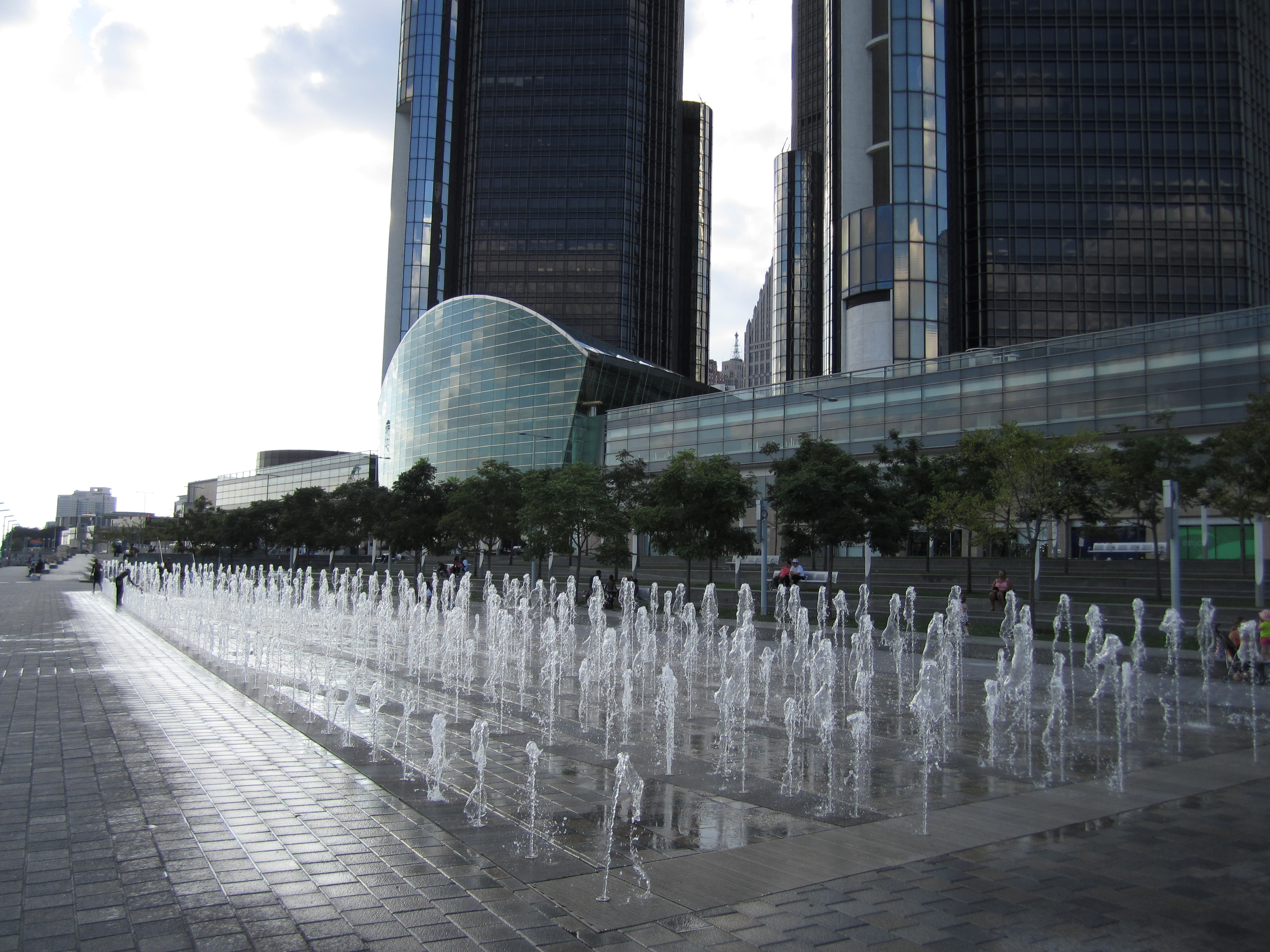
- GM Plaza and Promenade on the riverfront at the Renaissance Center
- Location: Detroit
- Established: 2007; 19 years ago
- Designation: Municipal

The Detroit International Riverfront includes a 5 1/2-mile (8.8 km) promenade called the River Walk which is to extend from the Ambassador Bridge to Belle Isle. The path is located directly on the river, sometimes bridging it. The path is 62 feet (18 3/4 m) wide in most places, with separate lanes for pedestrian and wheeled (such as bicycles or inline skate) traffic. Pavilions, fishing piers and benches are located at intervals along the path.

The east riverfront promenade connects an area known as Rivertown. It extends along the east riverfront area from the Huntington Place convention and exhibit facility to the Belle Isle State Park bridge and includes the Renaissance Center, GM Plaza and Promenade, William G. Milliken State Park and Harbor, Stroh River Place, Chene Park, Mt Elliott Park and Gabriel Richard Park. The river walk is designed to supplement new retail and residential development, and includes the newly renovated historic Alden Park Towers. Architect Eric J. Hill aided in its design.

The first 3.5 miles (5.6 km) of continuous riverfront promenade and two of the four planned pavilions opened to the public on June 6, 2007. Rivard Plaza located at the foot of Rivard Street features a covered seating, a carousel, concessions and bike rentals. Also opening in 2007 was Richard Plaza located in Gabriel Richard Park featuring covered seating, concessions and a butterfly garden. At the time, this meant The River Walk was continuous from Joe Louis Arena to Milliken State Park with unfinished sections between the state park and River Place, and another between Mt Elliot Park and Gabriel Richard Park at the former site of the Uniroyal Tire factory west of Belle Isle Bridge. In 2019, a section was completed between Aretha Franklin Amphitheater and River Place called Robert C. Valade Park.Valade Park Finally, the promenade in front of the Uniroyal site was completed in 2023, connecting the long existing gap between Mt. Elliot Park and Gabriel Richard Park. Most recently, the riverwalk was extended west of its previous ending point at what was Joe Louis Arena, continuing past the high-rise Riverfront Towers and extending into Ralph C. Wilson Centenial Park, which opened in October 2025. The west riverfront promenade will eventually connect to River Rouge in the southwest side.

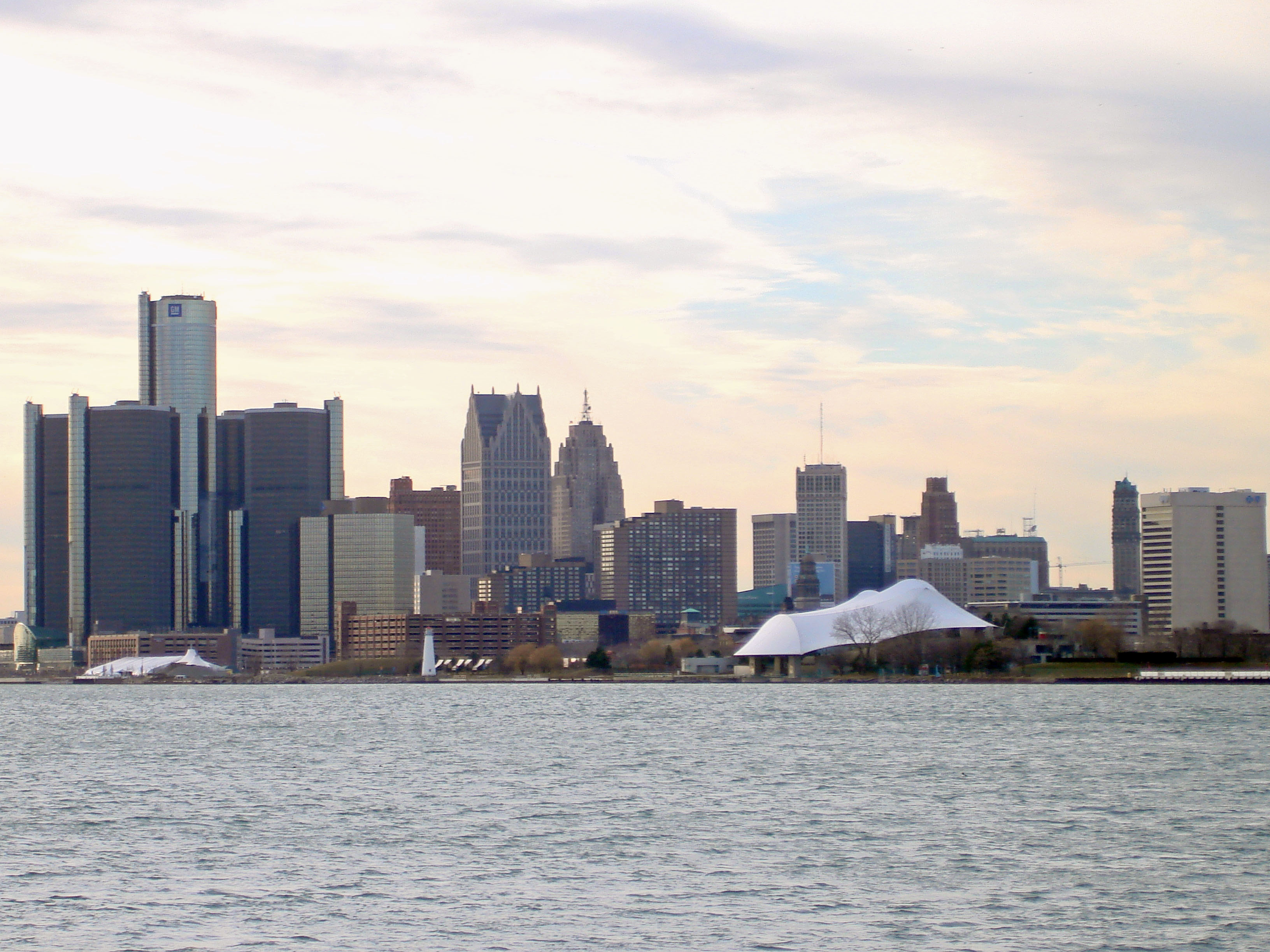
View of the William G. Milliken State Park and Harbor from across the Detroit River

=== William G. Milliken State Park and Harbor ===
William G. Milliken State Park and Harbor (formerly Tri-Centennial State Park and Harbor) is a state park in Michigan, and one of only two state parks located within an urban area. The park consist of the former city-owned St. Aubin Park and Marina. Located just east of downtown Detroit in the Near-East Riverfront, it covers 31 acres (13 ha) on the Detroit River, and includes a 52-slip harbor of refuge. A 63-foot (19 m) conical brick light tower marks the harbor entrance. The park's first phase opened in 2003, included refurbishing of the marina and construction of lighthouse. Construction on the second phase, adjacent to Rivard Plaza, to expand the park started in summer 2008 and was completed in summer 2009. In fall 2009, the state park was renamed in honor of former Michigan Governor William G. Milliken.

== Riverfront activities ==
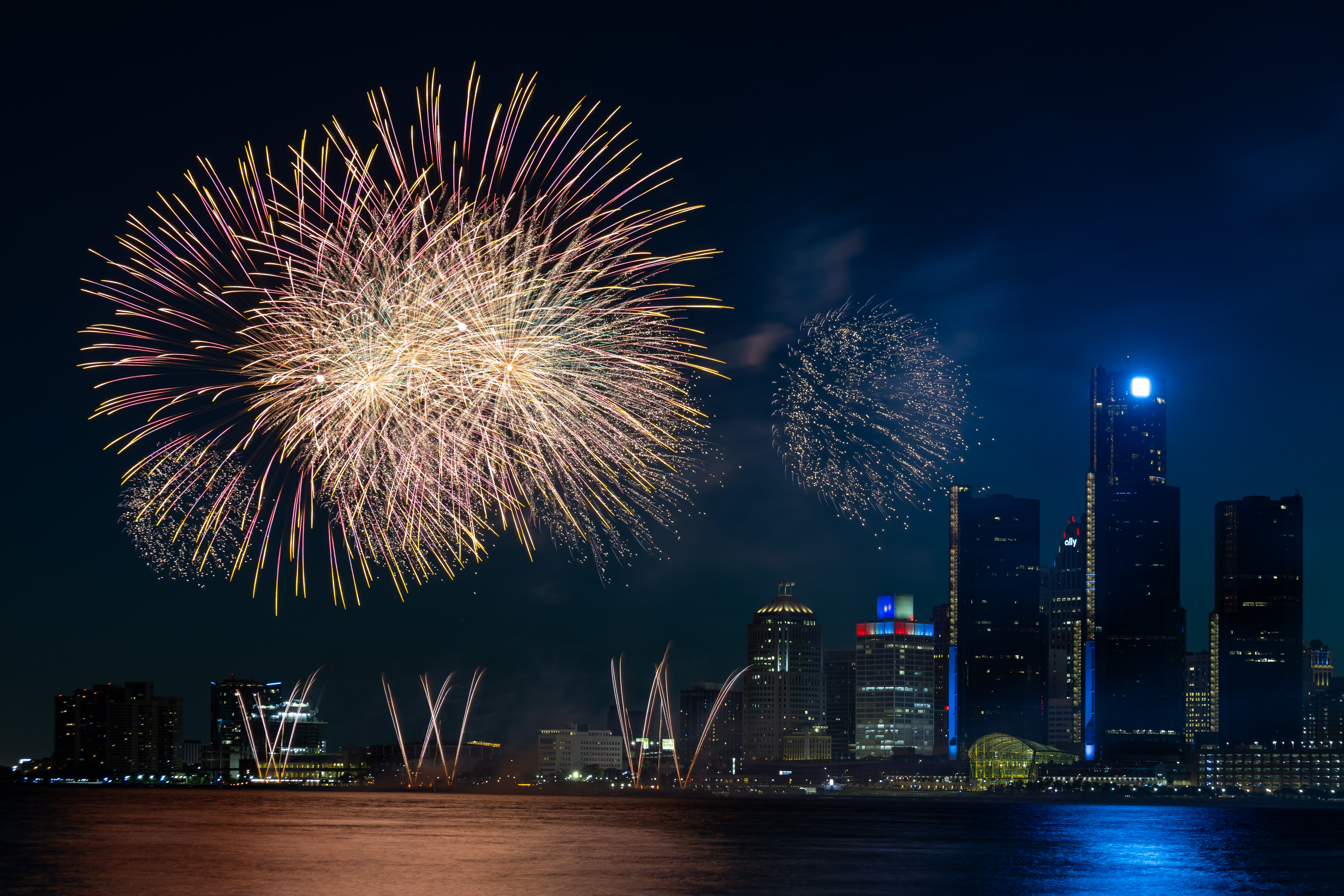
Freedom festival's fireworks

Detroit River Days, a five-day festival on the International Riverfront, marked the 2007 opening of the riverfront promenade along the east river leading up to the Detroit–Windsor International Freedom Festival fireworks. Detroit and Windsor jointly celebrate the multi-day festival the last week of June which draws about 3.5 million visitors during the week in order to commemorate each country's respective National holiday (US Independence Day on July 4 and Canada Day on July 1). The festival began in 1959. It is organized by the Parade Company, a well sponsored not-for-profit organization governed by the Michigan Thanksgiving Parade Foundation. From 2007, the festival split into separate events on each side of the river. The fireworks display on the Detroit side continued to feature a Canadian element, however, with the national anthem of both countries being played and a Canadian flag paraded by helicopter.

Traditionally, several days of events were planned, ending with one of the world's largest fireworks displays, sponsored by Target. In prior years, the fireworks display has been billed as the world's largest. On the Windsor side, there is a midway consisting of carnival rides and concessions during the festival. The Midway operates as stand-alone attraction at the end of June, beginning of July.

The Detroit Electronic Music Festival (DEMF) is an electronic dance music showcase held in Hart Plaza each Memorial Day weekend since 2000. In subsequent years, the similarly themed festivals Movement (2003–2004), Fuse-In (2005) and currently, Movement: Detroit's Electronic Music Festival (2006–present) continue the DEMF's traditions, with each name change reflecting shifts in festival management. All of these festivals featured performances by musicians and DJs, and emphasized the progressive qualities of the culture surrounding electronic music.

The International Riverfront is host to part of the Detroit International Jazz Festival held in Hart Plaza each Labor Day weekend. Hart Plaza is also the traditional location of rallies to celebrate championships won by Detroit's major sports teams. Both Detroit and Windsor have hosted the Red Bull Air Race World Championship on the International Riverfront.

== Photo gallery ==
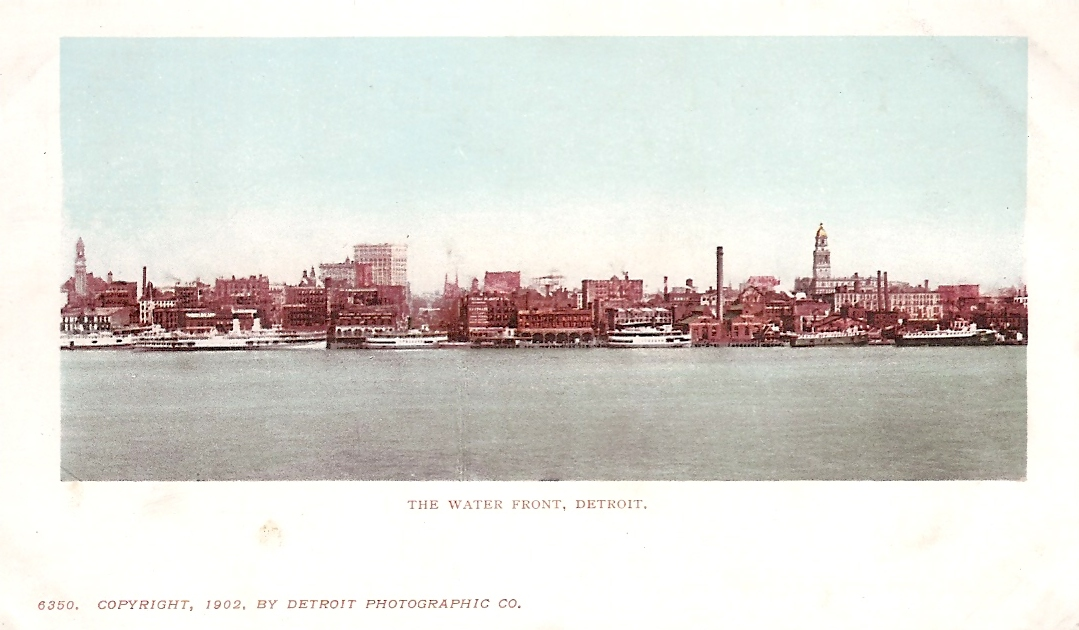
Riverfront circa 1901

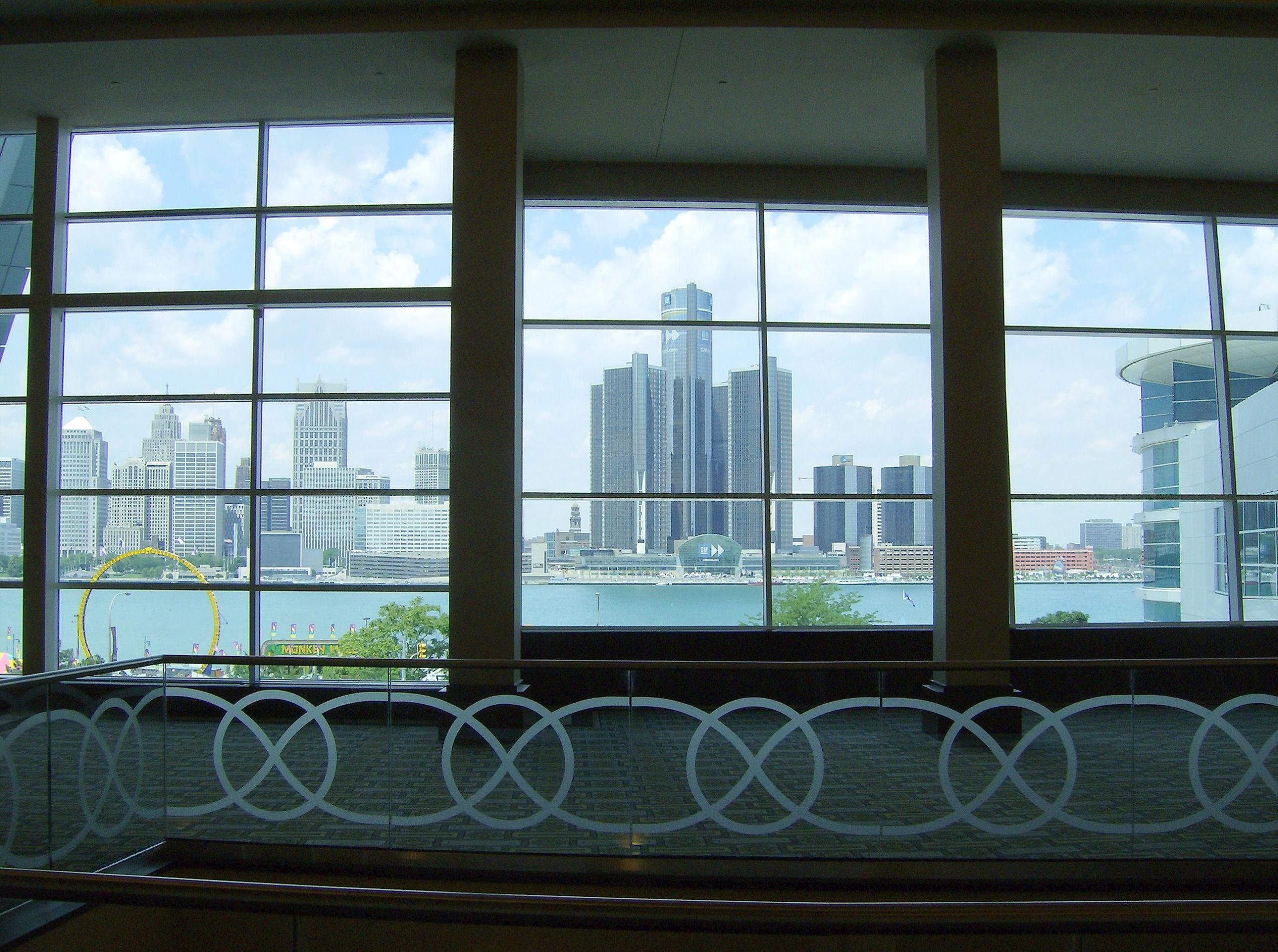
View from Caesars Windsor casino resort overlooking Detroit

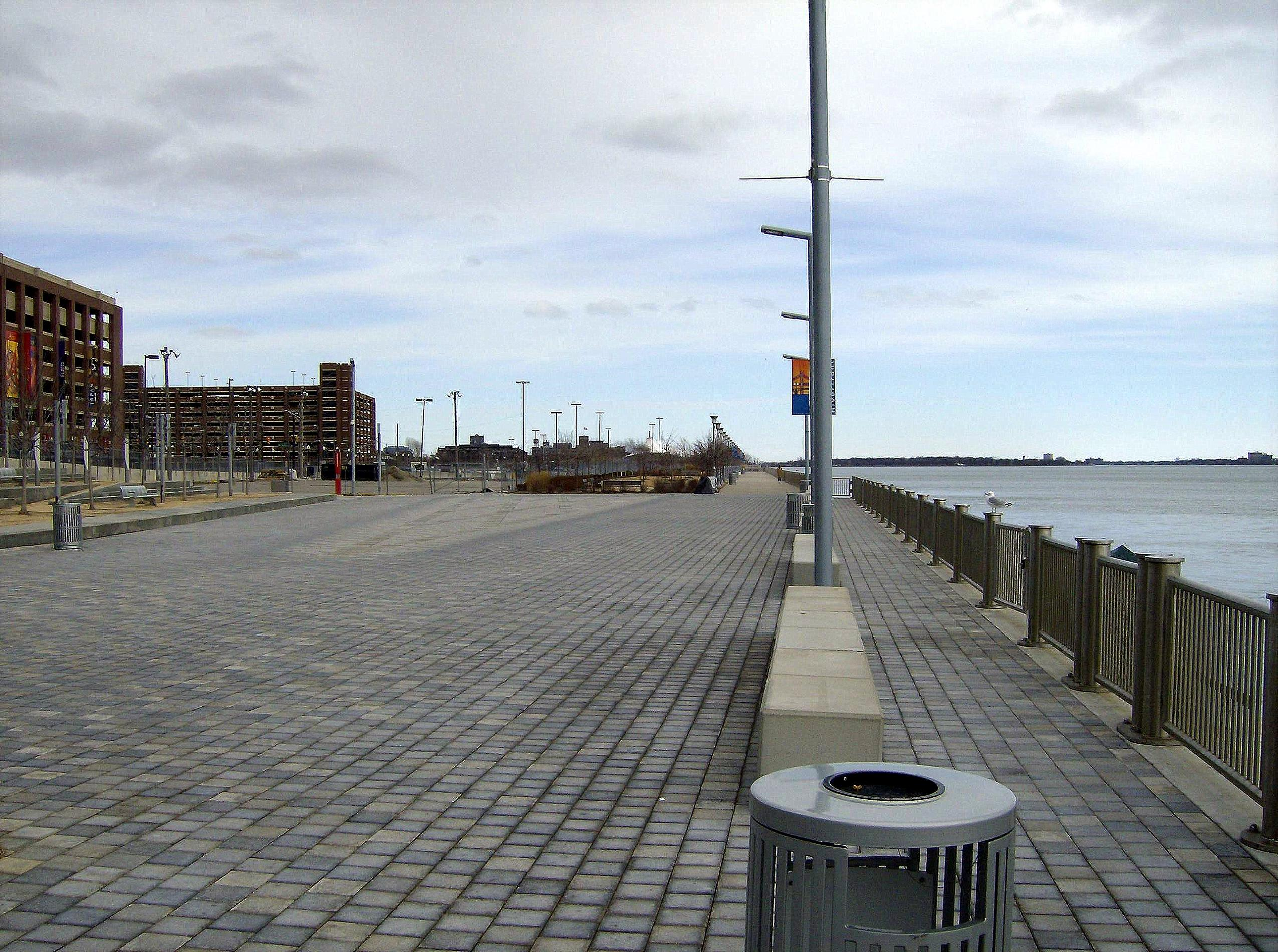
Looking upriver to Belle Isle State Park

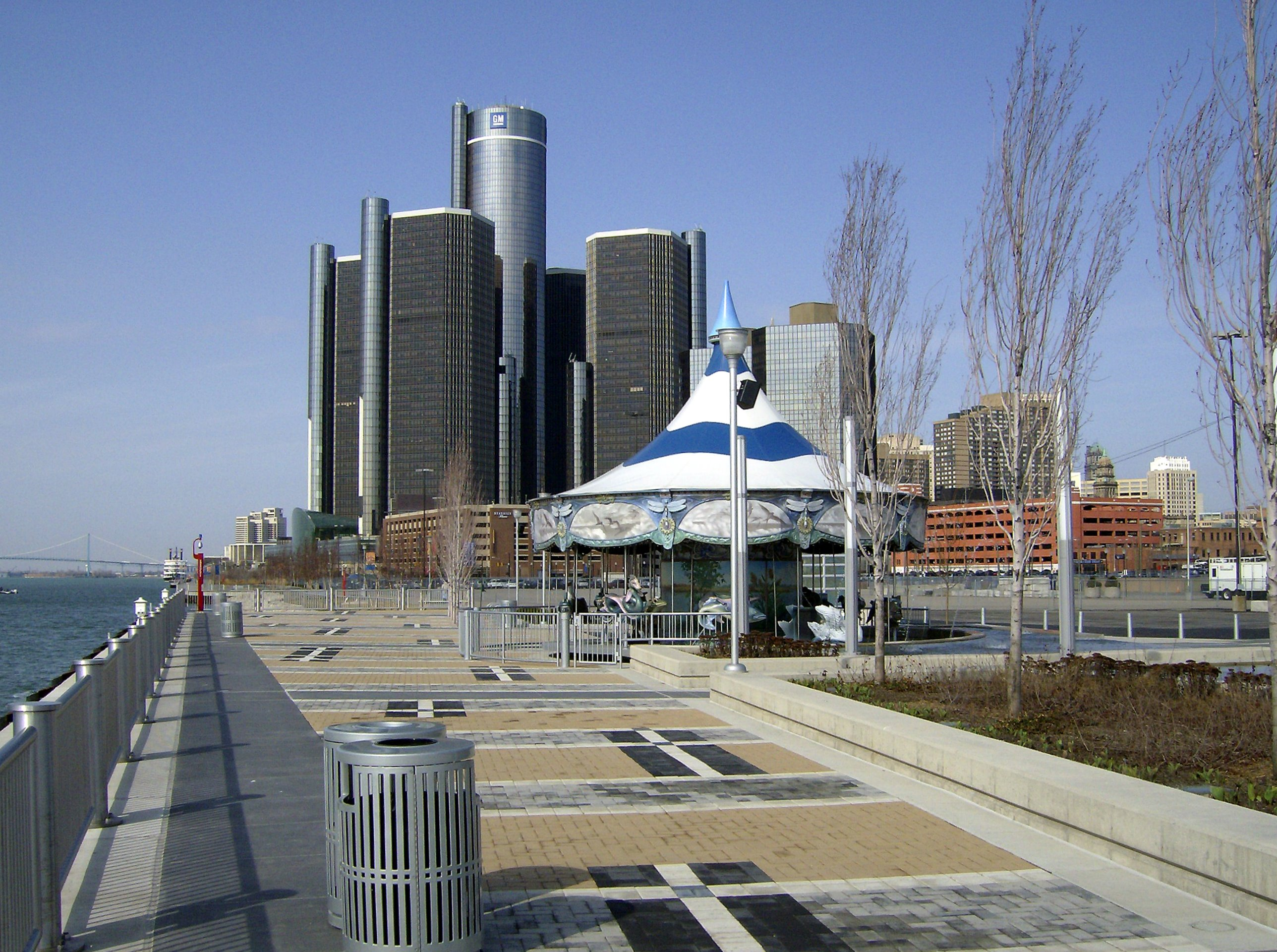
Rivard Plaza includes a Merry-Go-Round.

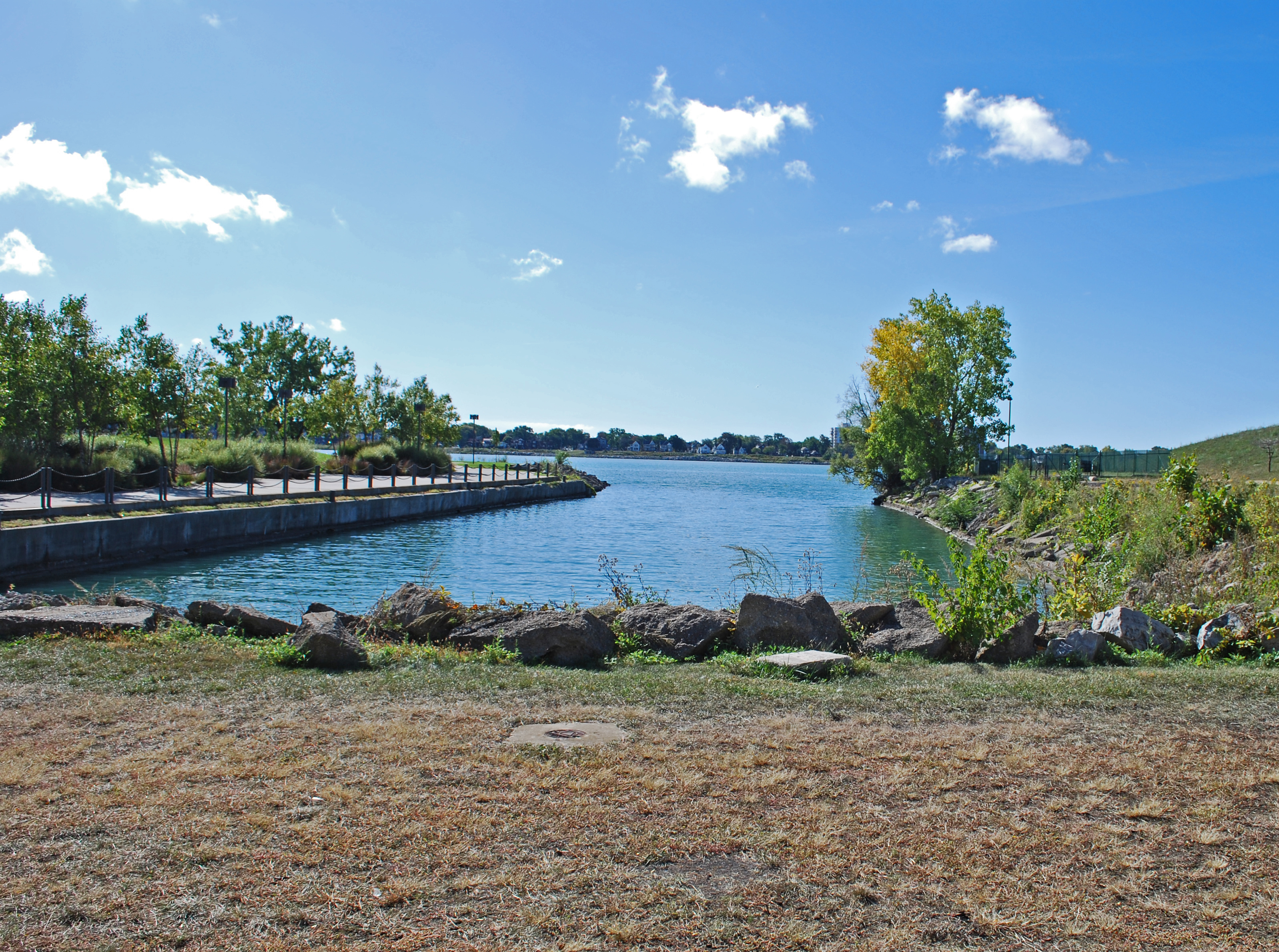
Dry Dock Complex historic redevelopment

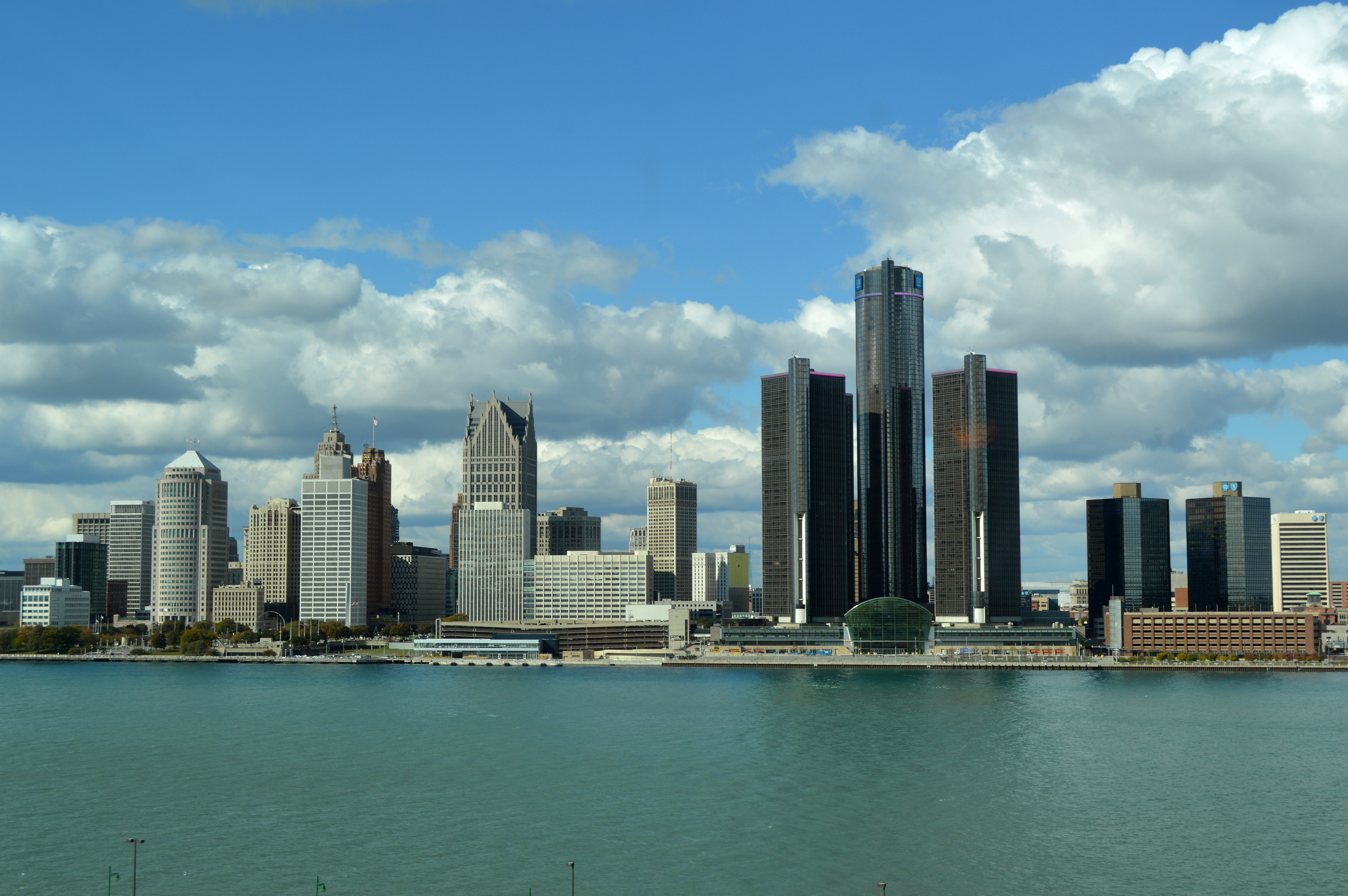
Skyline along the International Riverfront

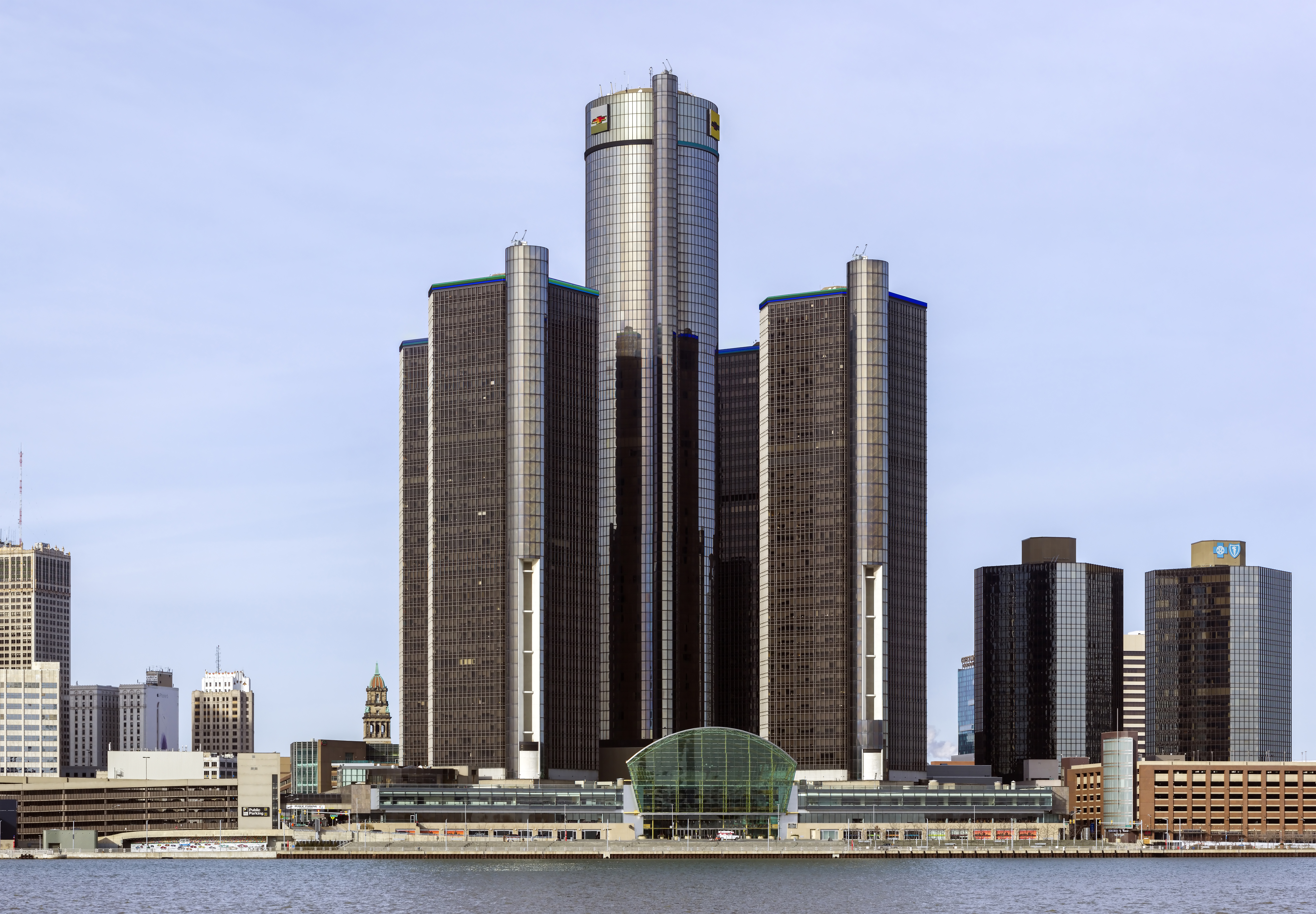
Renaissance Center

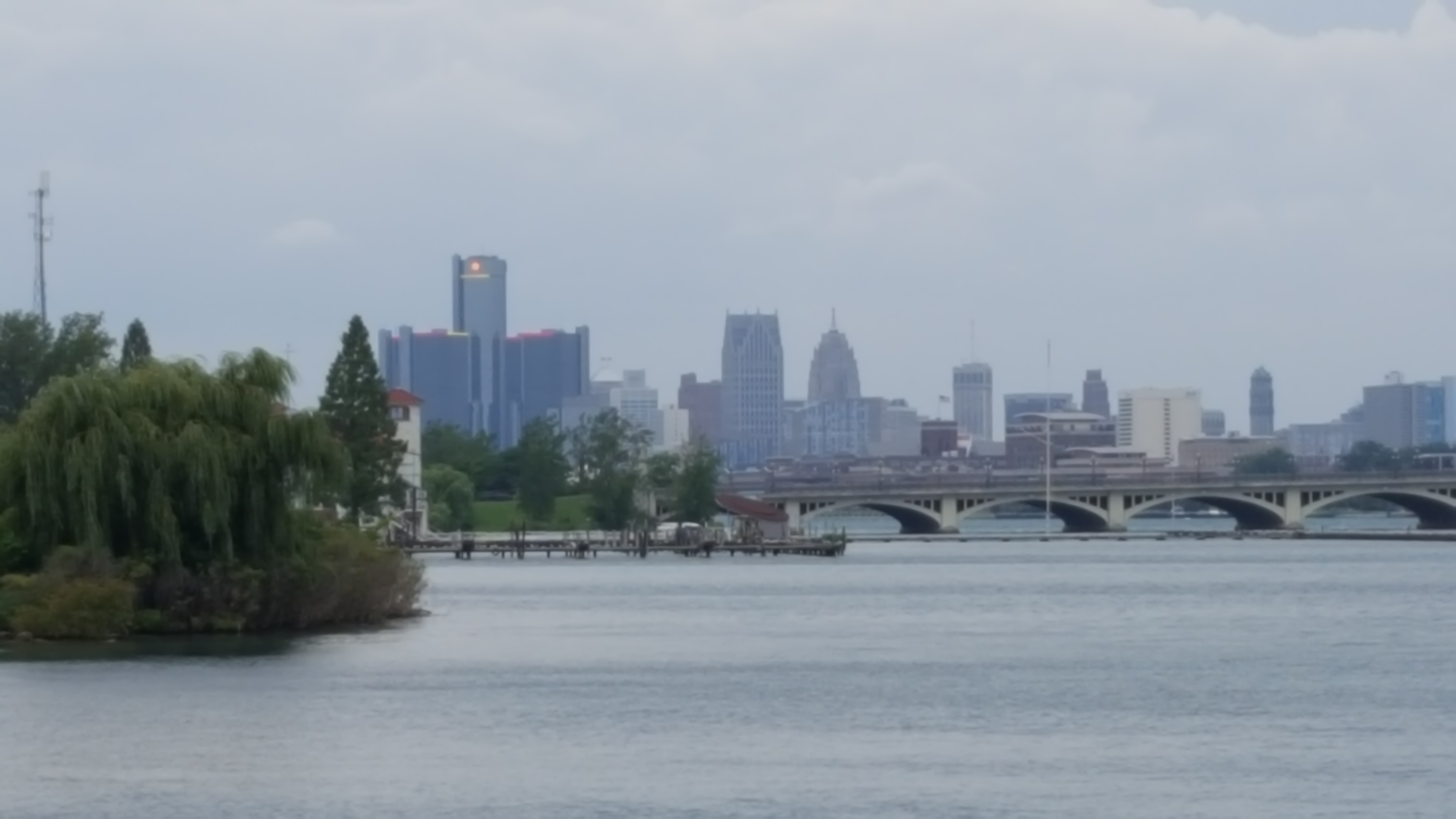
Detroit's skyline as seen from Belle Isle

== See also ==
- List of contemporary amphitheatres

== References and further reading ==
- Cantor, George (2005). Detroit: An Insiders Guide to Michigan. University of Michigan Press. ISBN 0472030922.
- Hill, Eric J. and John Gallagher (2002). AIA Detroit: The American Institute of Architects Guide to Detroit Architecture. Wayne State University Press. ISBN 0-8143-3120-3.
- Rodriguez, Michael and Thomas Featherstone (2003). Detroit's Belle Isle Island Park Gem (Images of America). Arcadia Publishing. ISBN 0-7385-2315-1.
- Sobocinski, Melanie Grunow (2005). Detroit and Rome: building on the past. Regents of the University of Michigan. ISBN 0933691092.
