= Parke Davis =

Parke Davis may refer to:

- Parke-Davis, the pharmaceutical company
- Parke H. Davis, an American football player, coach, and historian
