= Alden Park Towers =

- U.S. National Register of Historic Places
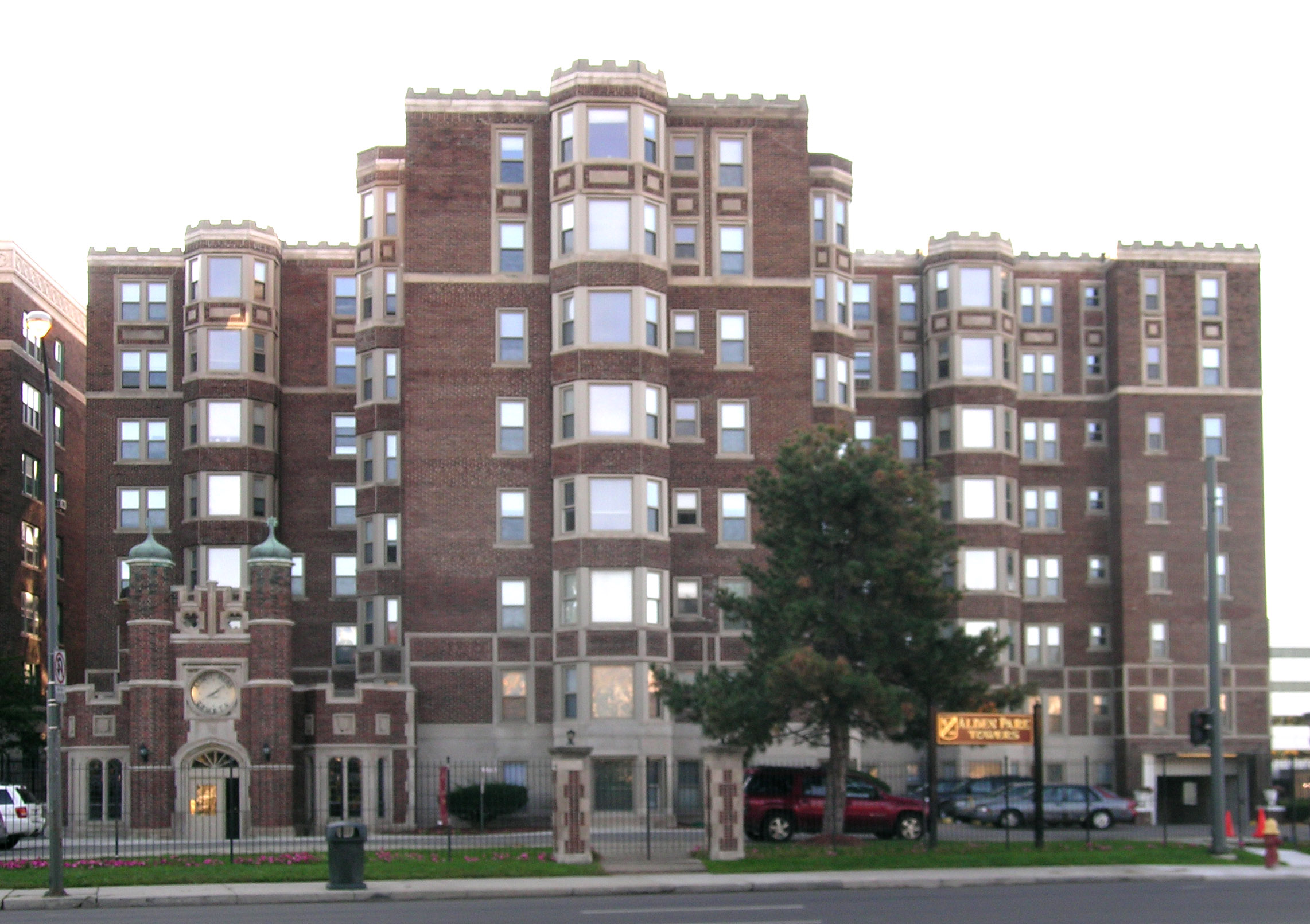

- Location within Michigan Location within the United States
- Interactive map
- Location: 8100 E. Jefferson Ave., Detroit, Michigan
- Coordinates: 42°21′5″N 82°59′40″W
- Built: 1922; 104 years ago
- Architectural style: Tudor Revival
- MPS: East Jefferson Avenue Residential TR
- NRHP reference No.: 85002933
- Added to NRHP: October 9, 1985

The Alden Park Towers consists of a compound of four eight-story luxury apartment buildings located at 8100 East Jefferson Avenue along the Gold Coast in Detroit, Michigan. It is currently known as Alden Towers. The collective of structures was listed on the National Register of Historic Places in 1985.

== Description ==
Alden Park Towers consists of four eight-story buildings built from red brick with stone trim. The buildings are interconnected at the first story; this level formerly housed commercial services such as grocery store and laundry. The exterior is highly ornamented, with projecting bay windows extending from the ground to the roof. The crenellated limestone at the roofline distinguishes these apartments from other similar buildings in Detroit. The buildings originally held 352 apartments; the number is currently 389.

== History ==
The Alden Park Towers were built in 1922 as the Berman Apartments. They were built south of Jefferson to take advantage of the natural beauty of the Detroit River. They were one of the few large apartment buildings built in Detroit.

In 1971, the property was purchased for $6.5 million by Saperstein & Associates on a 40-year HUD-insured mortgage. In 2005, the property was almost sold at auction, but was pulled at the last minute when a $3 million debt on the mortgage was resolved.

In 2012, Triton Properties acquired the historic Alden Park Towers property, located on Detroit's Gold Coast (the East Jefferson riverfront) out of foreclosure for $2 million, and began a $5 million plus renovation of all 382 apartment units in the four towers. The project included renovation of common area, including a brand-new grand lobby with a large fireplace as the focal point, and a new fitness center with all-new equipment and flatscreen TVs. The entire building is outfitted with free Wi-Fi. The grand lobby, designed with assistance from Sharon Carlile of Royal Oak's Italmoda, mimics the lobby of a modern boutique hotel. Additionally, major renovation to the property's riverfront was undertaken. Renovation work was completed in the first quarter 2015.

== See also ==
- Riverfront Towers
- International Riverfront
