= William G. Milliken State Park and Harbor =

State Park in Wayne County, Michigan

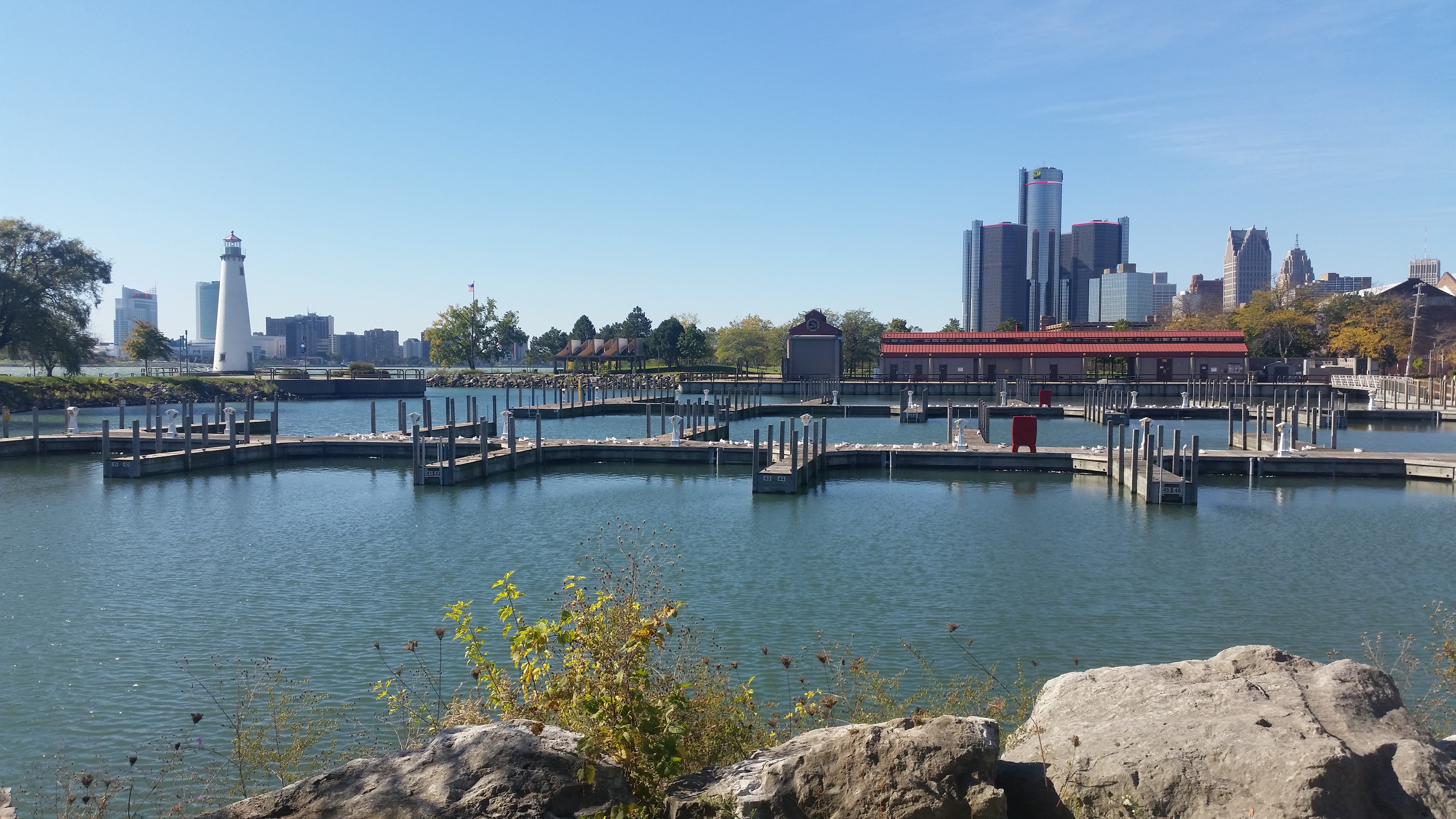
- View of the harbor and lighthouse (October 2017)

- Location within Michigan Location within the United States
- Location: Detroit International Riverfront, Detroit, Michigan
- Coordinates: 42°19′57″N 83°1′30″W
- Area: 31 acres (13 ha)
- Elevation: 584 ft (178 m)
- Established: 2004 (renamed in 2009)
- Administrator: Michigan Department of Natural Resources
- Designation: Michigan state park
- Named for: Governor William Milliken
- Website: Official website

The William G. Milliken State Park and Harbor (formerly named Tri-Centennial State Park and Harbor) is a public recreation area located on the Detroit River just east of downtown Detroit, Michigan, on a portion of the city's International Riverfront. The state park's 31 acres (13 ha) include wetlands, paved trails, and a 52-slip harbor of refuge. A 63-foot (19 m) conical brick lighthouse tower, designed as a scaled-down replica of the Tawas Point Light, marks the harbor entrance.

== History ==
The park consists of the former city-owned St. Aubin Park and Marina and an adjacent reclaimed brownfield. The park area was taken over by the Michigan Department of Natural Resources in 2004 as Tri-Centennial State Park to commemorate the founding of Fort Detroit in 1701. It was Michigan's first state park to be situated in an urban area. Phase I of the park's development, which included refurbishing the marina and construction of the light tower, opened on May 20, 2004. Construction of the 6-acre (2.4 ha) Phase II, or expansion, phase of the project began in summer 2008 and concluded in summer 2009. The Phase II project encompassed a parcel of post-industrial property adjacent to Rivard Plaza. On October 22, 2009, Tri-Centennial State Park was renamed in honor of Governor William G. Milliken. The Lowlands section of the park was officially opened to the public on December 3, 2009.

== Ecology ==
Much of the William G. Milliken State Park has been redeveloped as restoration wetlands, intended to mimic the riverine wetlands that once bordered the Detroit River. The Michigan DNR hopes that these wetlands will be an attractive location for migratory birds. Ninety-seven percent of the former Detroit River wetlands have been lost to development; the de-development of Detroit in the 2000s created an opportunity for wetlands restoration.

== Access ==
The William G. Milliken State Park's official address is 1900 Atwater Street, on the near east side of Detroit and adjacent to the Jefferson Avenue corridor. In 2010, the city completed construction of the "Dequindre Extension" which connects the park to the Dequindre Cut.

== Activities and amenities ==
The park offers shoreline fishing, a picnic area with sail-covered pavilions, and a 52-slip harbor with transient and seasonal tie-ups.
