= Robert Thom (illustrator) =

Robert Alan Thom (March 4, 1915 – December 31, 1979) was an American illustrator who specialized in the portrayal of historical scenes for commercial patrons. He is perhaps best known for his series of 40 paintings depicting the history of pharmacy, and his series of 45 paintings depicting the history of medicine, both commissioned by Parke-Davis.

== Biography ==
Thom was born in Grand Rapids, Michigan. A student of Robert Brackman, he began his career as a commercial illustrator for General Motors and Detroit Edison in 1939, and set off as an independent artist in 1945. In this role, he produced many series of commissioned paintings for clients such as Kimberly-Clark (scenes from the history of "Graphic Communications Through the Ages"), Illinois Bell (scenes from the history of Illinois), Michigan Bell (scenes from the history of Michigan), and Chevrolet (scenes from the history of baseball). He died in Alma, Michigan.

== Legacy ==
Thom's works appear in galleries, museums, and universities worldwide, including the Baseball Hall of Fame and the White House.
