= River Place =

- Parke-Davis and Company Pharmaceutical Plant
- U.S. National Register of Historic Places
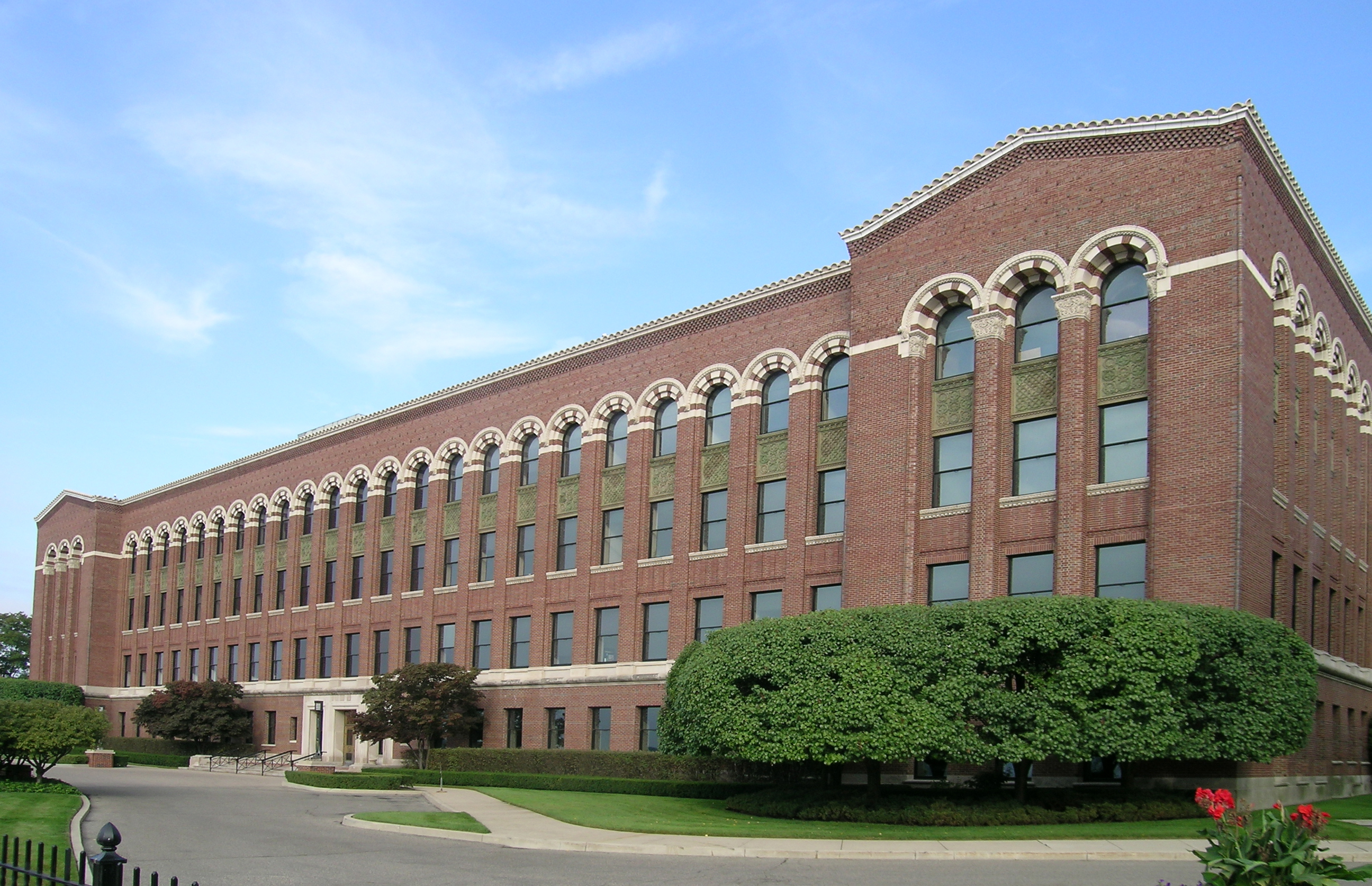
- River Place complex on the Detroit International Riverfront
- Interactive map
- Location: Detroit, Michigan; United States
- Coordinates: 42°20′13″N 83°0′59″W
- Built: 1891
- Architect: Donaldson and Meier, Albert Kahn, and Smith, Hinchman and Grylls
- Architectural style: Romanesque Revival
- NRHP reference No.: 85002445
- Added to NRHP: September 16, 1985

The historic River Place (also known as Stroh River Place) is located in Detroit, Michigan, bounded by Joseph Campau Avenue, Wight Street, McDougall Street, and the Detroit International Riverfront. It was formerly the Parke-Davis and Company Pharmaceutical Plant. The complex was listed on the National Register of Historic Places in 1985.

== History and significance ==
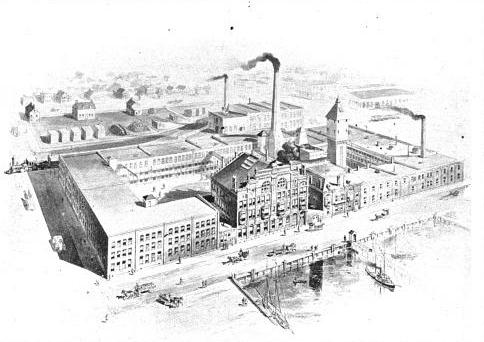
Parke-Davis Laboratories, c. 1891

In the 1870s, Parke-Davis moved to the riverfront property this complex now occupies. Between 1891 and 1955, the company expanded the complex to cover over 14 acres (5.7 ha), building the 26 structures that still stand. These buildings were designed by some of the most prominent Detroit architects, including Donaldson and Meier, Albert Kahn, and Smith, Hinchman and Grylls. As a group, the buildings in the complex are significant as the represent a wide variety of industrial architecture from the early 20th century.

In 1979, Parke-Davis sold its property in Detroit, including the Research Laboratory, to the Stroh family (of Stroh Brewery Company). The complex, now known as River Place, has been converted into offices, retail space, residences, and a hotel.

== Description ==
These buildings range from brick mill buildings built at the turn of the 20th century to reinforced concrete buildings constructed after 1920 and range from one to six stories in height. The central and northern portions of the complex are tightly packed with interconnected buildings. There is more open space at the southern edge along the river.

The most notable single building in this group is the Riverwalk Hotel Detroit, the former Parke-Davis Research Laboratory, built in 1902 along the Detroit River. This building was the first industrial research laboratory in the U.S. established for the specific purpose of conducting pharmacological research, inaugurating the commercial pure science approach which has driven the rapid development of pharmaceutical technology. The research laboratory was declared a National Historic Landmark in 1976.

== Gallery ==
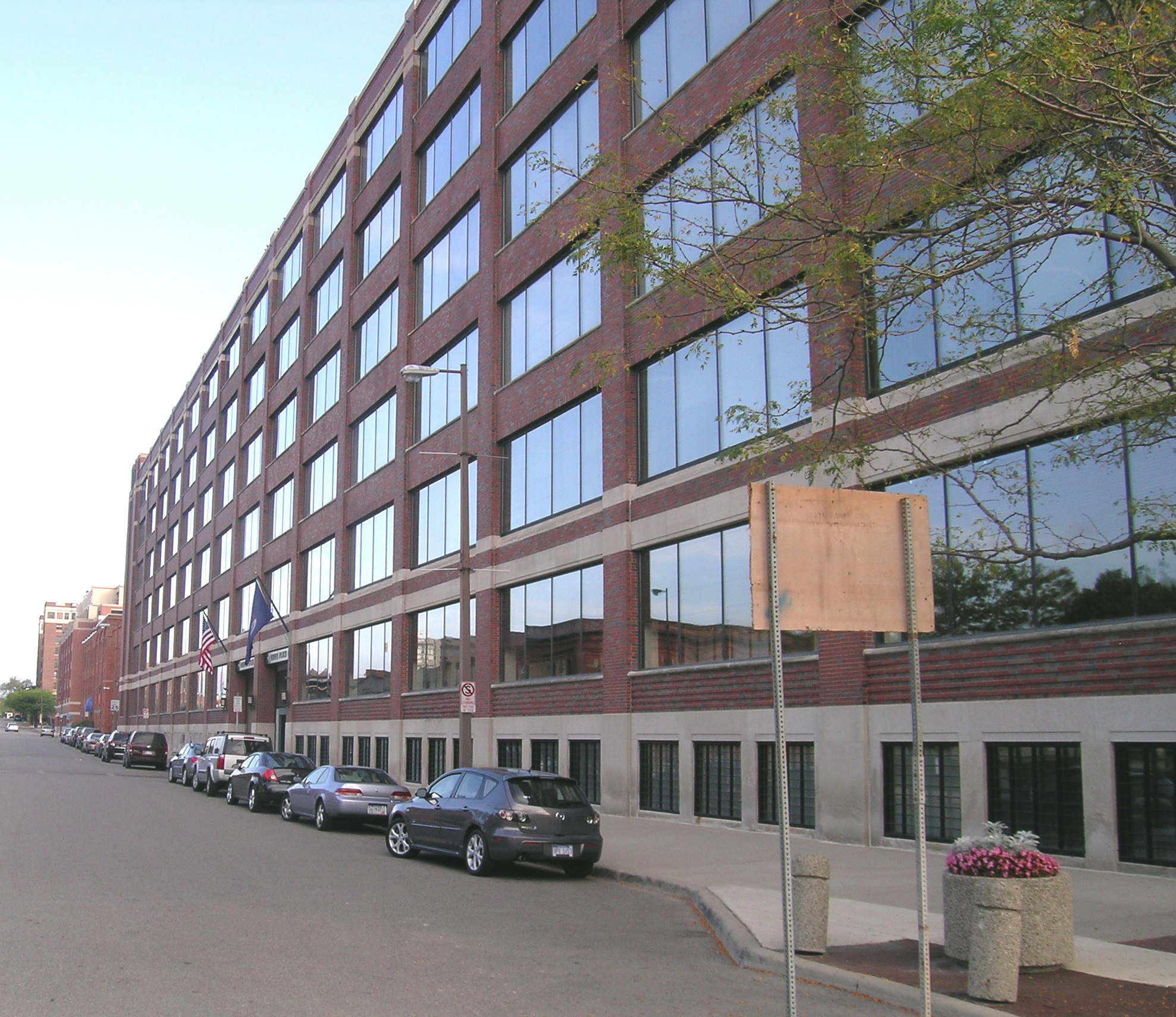
Looking north along Joseph Campau Avenue

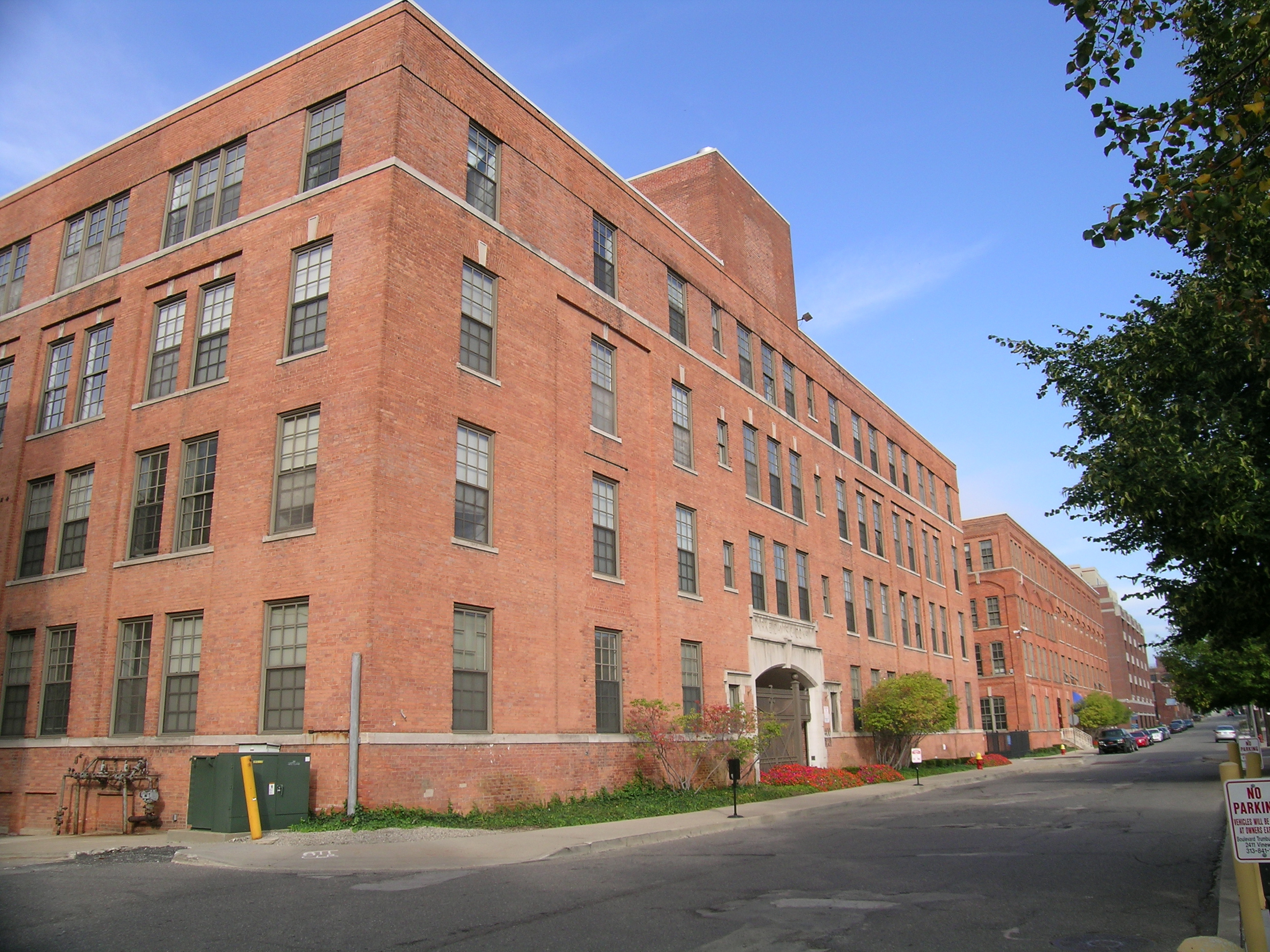
Looking north along McDougall Street

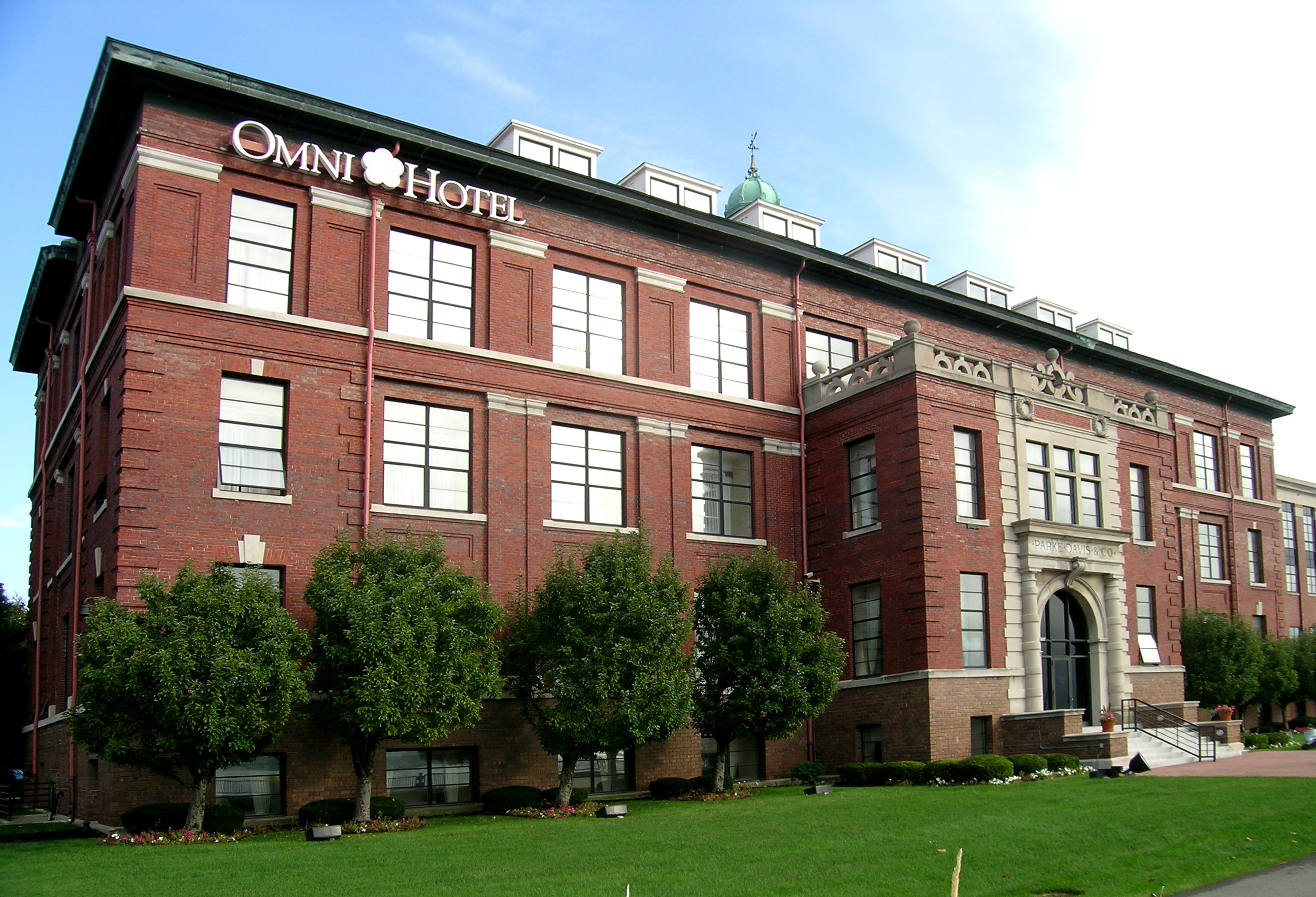
Riverwalk Hotel Detroit, formerly the Parke-Davis Research Laboratory

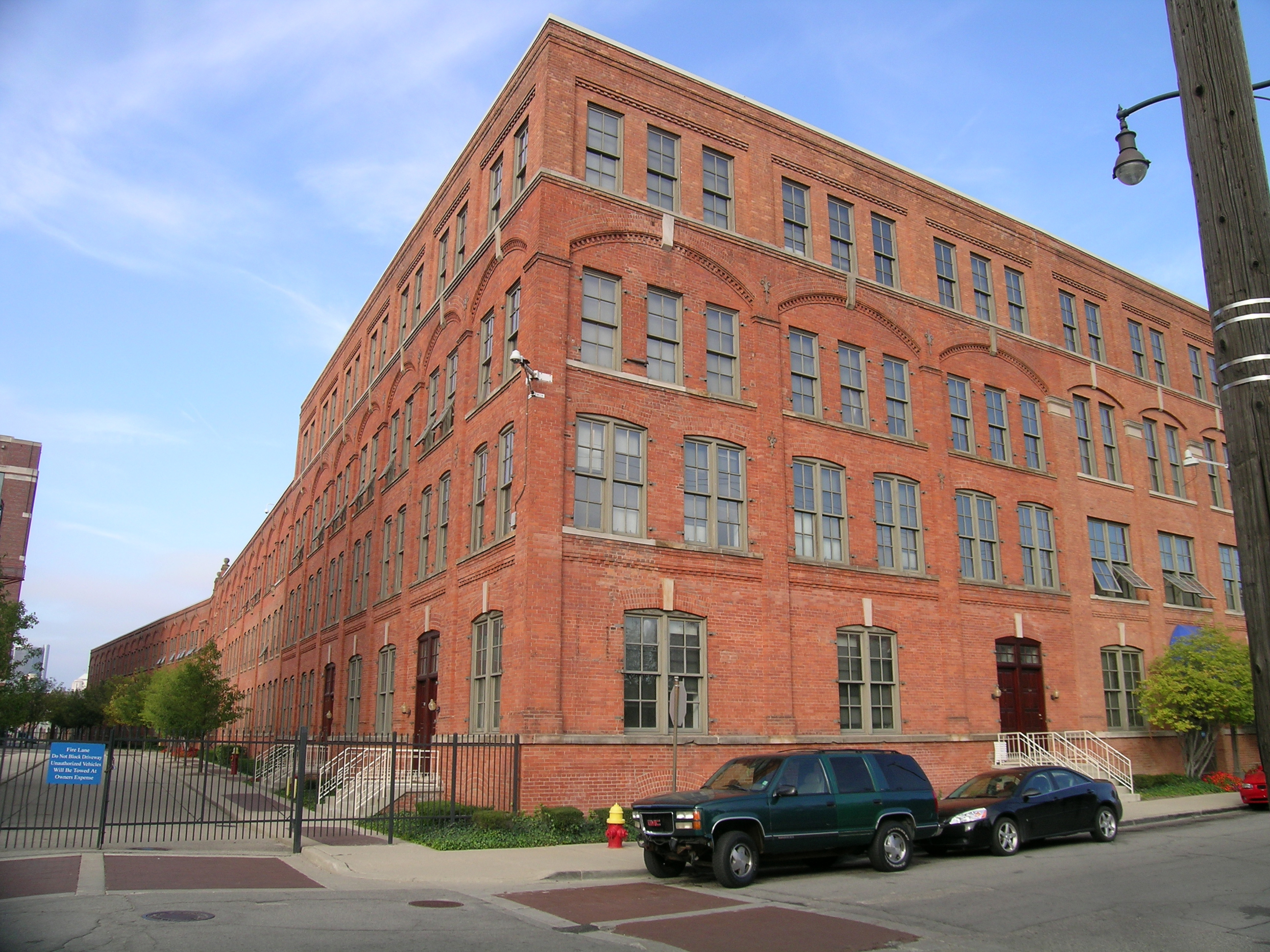
Building in complex
