= Riverwalk Hotel Detroit =

- Parke-Davis Research Laboratory
- U.S. National Register of Historic Places
- U.S. National Historic Landmark
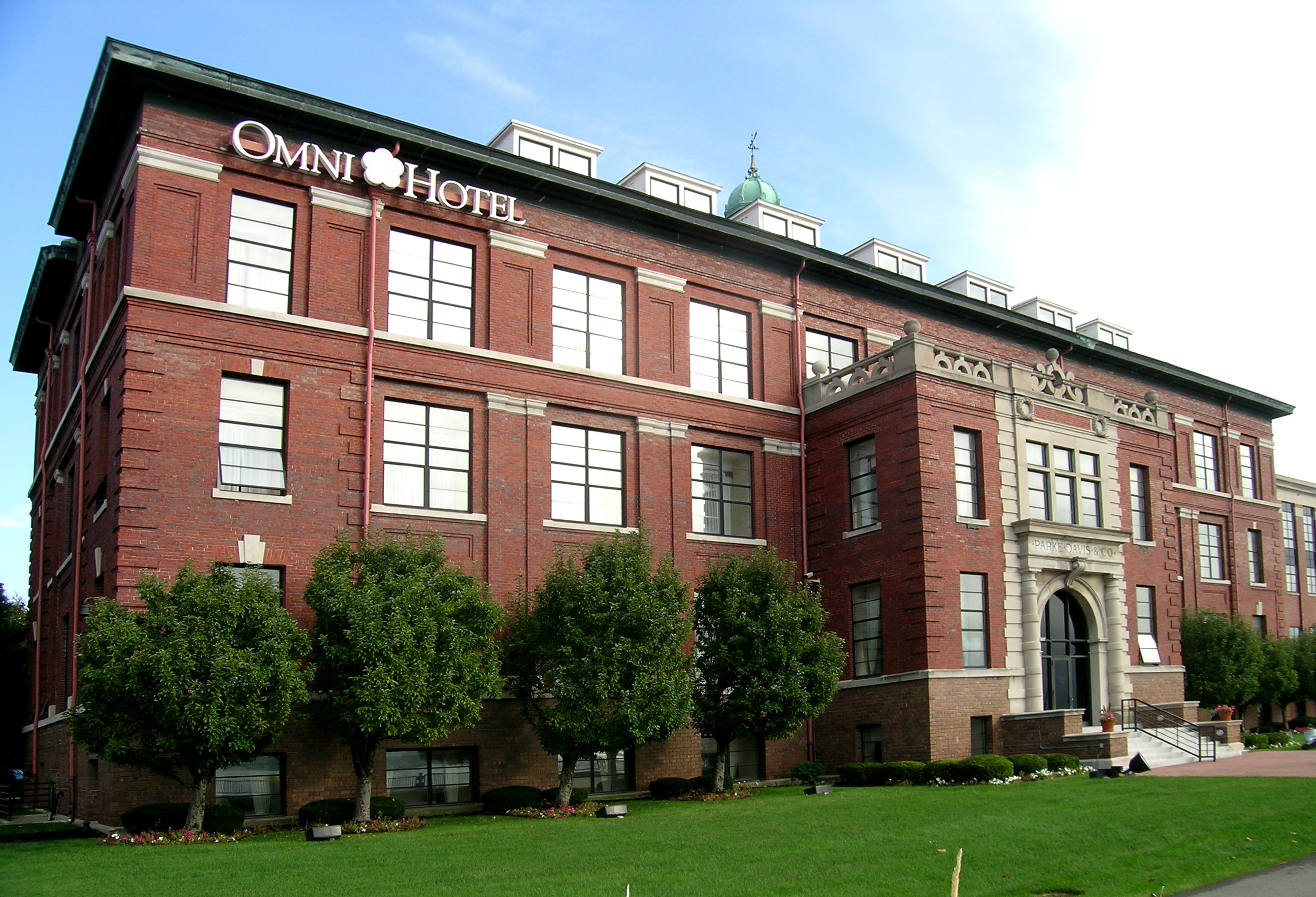
- Omni Hotel Detroit, 2008
- Interactive map
- Location: Detroit, Michigan; United States
- Coordinates: 42°20′13″N 83°0′52″W
- Built: 1873, 1902
- Architect: Donaldson and Meier, Albert Kahn
- Architectural style: Romanesque Revival
- NRHP reference No.: 76001039

Significant dates
- Added to NRHP: May 11, 1976
- Designated NHL: May 11, 1976

The Roberts Riverwalk Urban Resort Hotel, formerly the Parke-Davis Research Laboratory also once known as Building 55-Detroit Research, is a defunct luxury hotel on the Detroit International Riverfront in Detroit, Michigan. The former research facility was redeveloped as a boutique luxury hotel in the 1980s. The building was designated a National Historic Landmark in 1976 for its historic significance as an early research laboratory.

== History ==
Parke-Davis moved its facilities to this location along the Detroit River in the 1870s to take advantage of the transportation provided by the river and nearby rail lines. The company eventually built 26 still-extant buildings in the area; the Parke-Davis campus as a whole, now known as Stroh River Place, is recognized on the National Register of Historic Places. However, the most significant structure in the group, the Parke-Davis Research Laboratory, is individually recognized as a National Historic Landmark.

The Research Laboratory was built in 1902 after Parke-Davis relocated the Detroit Boat Club to Belle Isle. The Detroit architectural firm of Donaldson & Meier designed the original building; later additions were designed by Albert Kahn. The building is a three-story brick building measuring approximately 120 by 40 feet (37 by 12 m), and is typical example of public architecture of the period.

=== Later history and current use ===
In 1979, Parke-Davis sold its Detroit complex, including the Research Laboratory, to the Stroh family (of Stroh Brewery Company). The complex's redevelopment into River Place included the conversion of the Research Laboratory to a hotel, known as the River Place Inn at its opening, designed by firm Sims–Varner. Bruning Development Corp purchased the hotel from the Stroh family in 1993, and signed Grand Heritage Hotels to manage and brand the property.

In 1998, the property was acquired by Omni Hotels & Resorts, and rebranded as the Omni Hotel Detroit at River Place. Omni closed the hotel in 2010, and it was acquired by St. Louis real estate developer Michael V. Roberts. The hotel underwent a $5 million renovation, which included the addition of a new conference center, and reopened in May 2011 as the Roberts Riverwalk Hotel.

In 2002, National Park Service staff recommended withdrawal of the site's landmark status due to loss of the building's historic integrity during the conversion.

The hotel closed in the early 2020s, and was purchased by Bedrock Detroit in 2022.

== Significance ==
This building was the first industrial research laboratory in the U.S. established for the specific purpose of conducting pharmacological research, inaugurating the commercial pure science approach which has driven the rapid development of pharmaceutical technology.

== Gallery ==
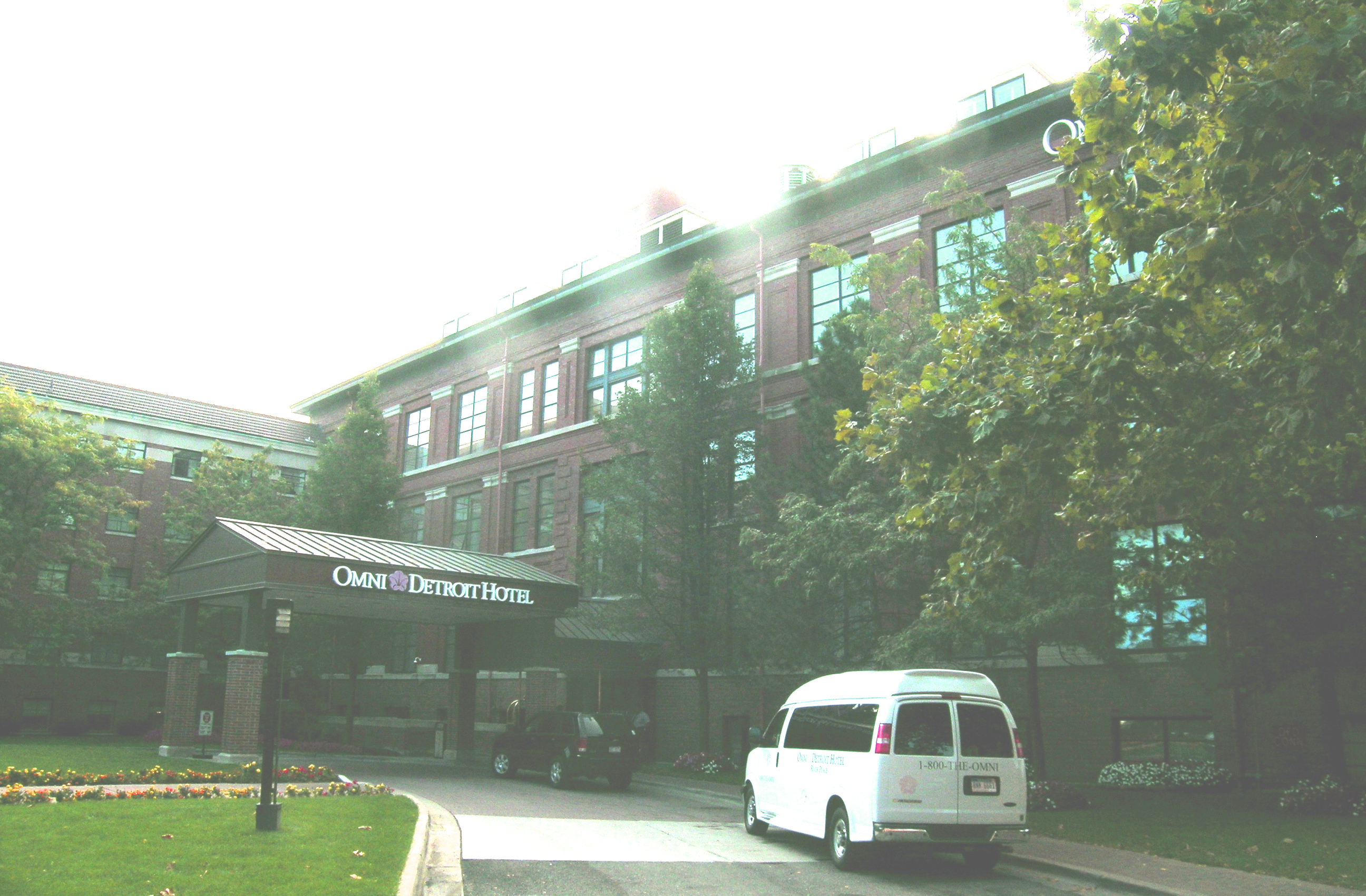
Rear of the Parke-Davis lab, now the entrance.

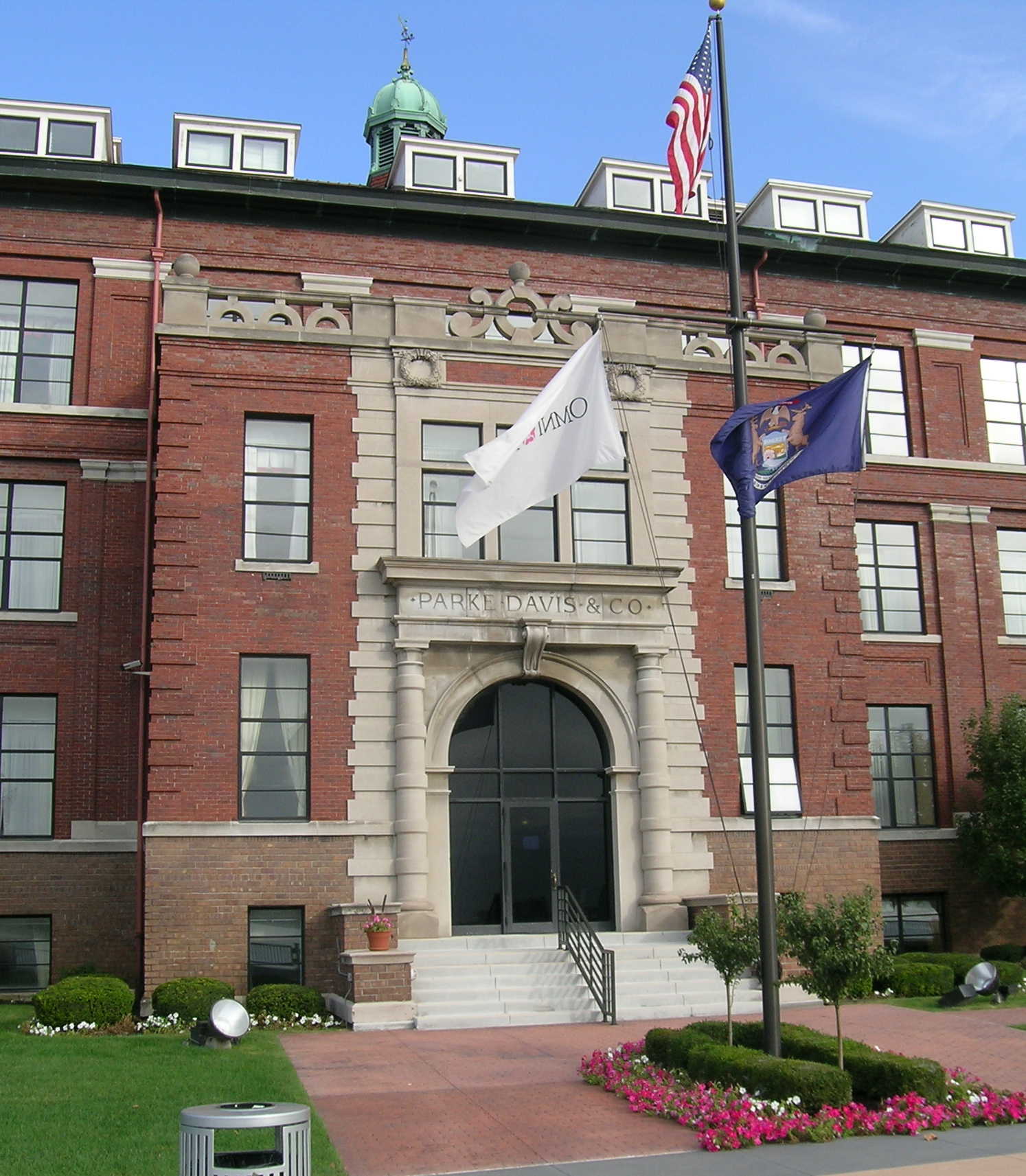
Door facing Detroit River.
