= Parke-Davis =

Pfizer subsidiary

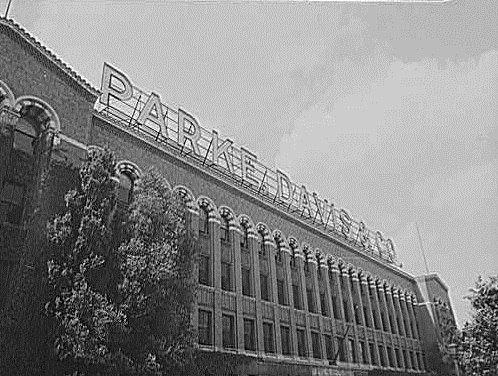
- Parke Davis Administration Building in 1943
- Type: Subsidiary
- Industry: Pharmaceutical
- Founded: 1866; 160 years ago
- Founders: Samuel P. Duffield
- Headquarters: Detroit, Michigan, United States
- Area served: Worldwide
- Parent: Pfizer

Parke-Davis is a subsidiary of the pharmaceutical company Pfizer. Although Parke, Davis & Co. is no longer an independent corporation, it was once America's oldest and largest drug maker, and played an important role in medical history. In 1970 Parke-Davis was acquired by Warner–Lambert, which in turn was acquired by Pfizer in 2000.

== History ==
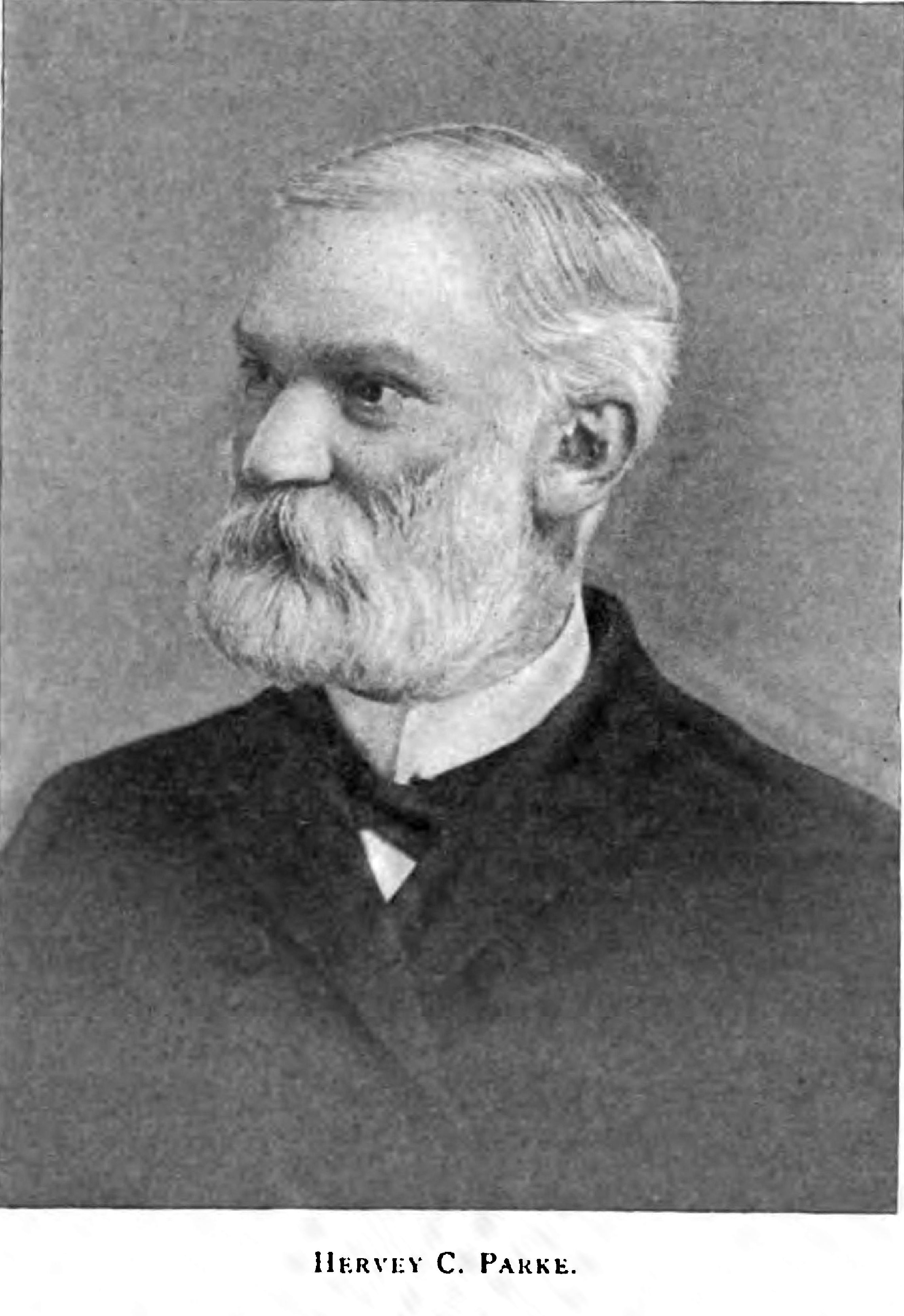
Hervey C. Parke

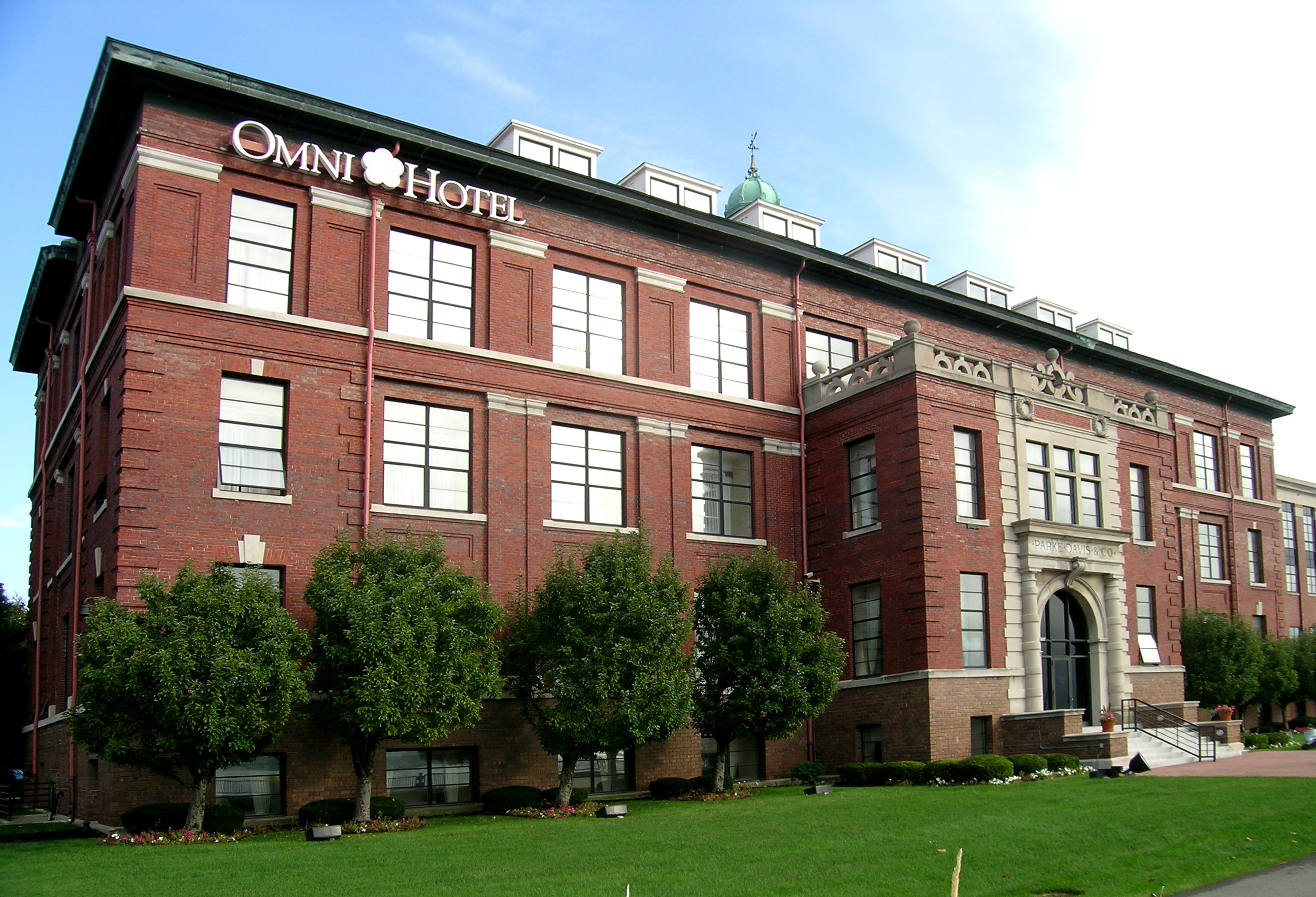
Former Parke-Davis Research Laboratory on the Detroit River (now in use as a hotel), 2008

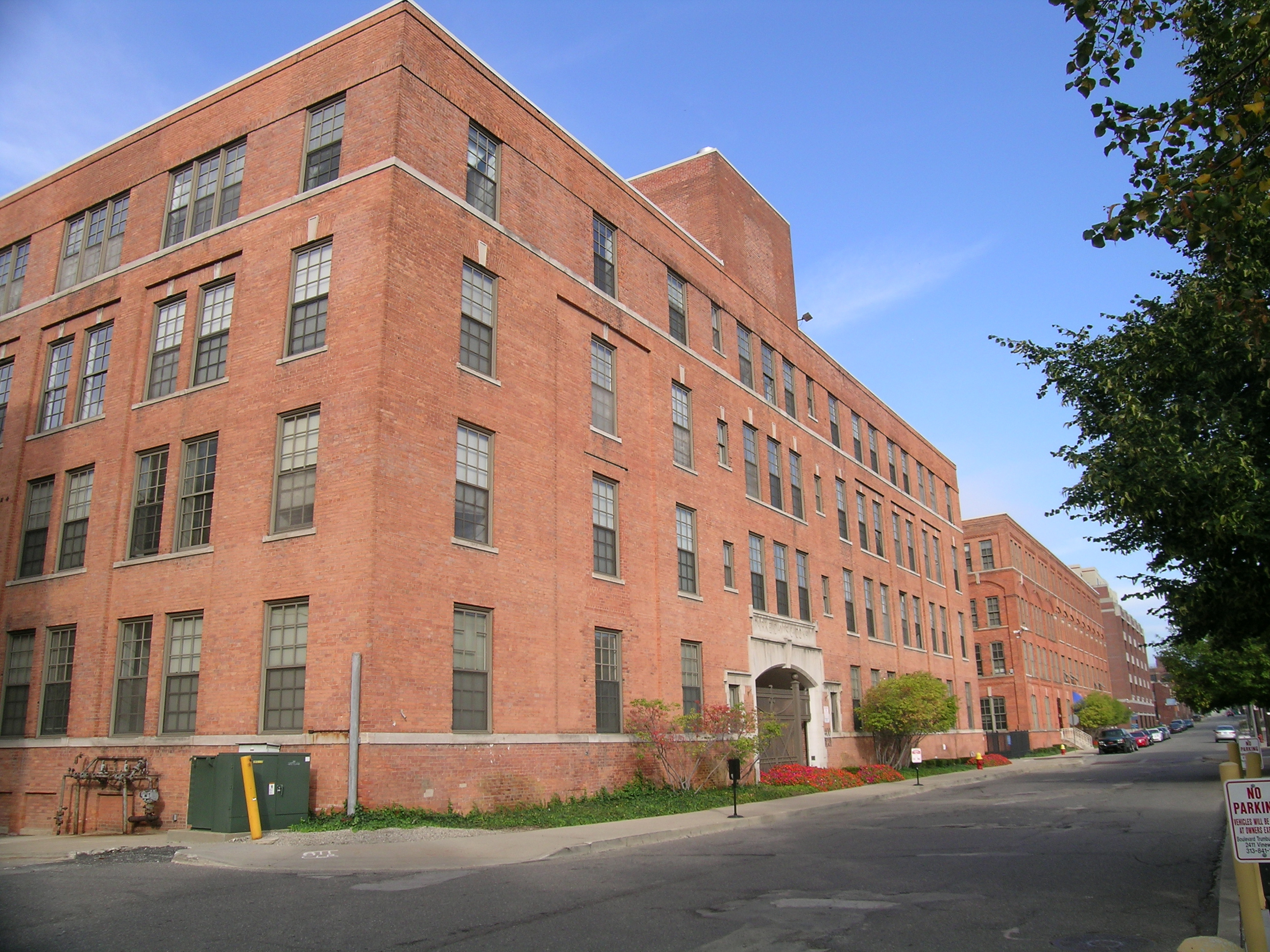
Building on the Parke-Davis Plant campus in Detroit, 2008

Parke, Davis and Company was founded in Detroit, Michigan by Dr. Samuel P. Duffield, a physician and pharmacist. In 1860, Dr. Duffield owned a small drugstore at the corner of Gratiot and Woodward Avenues. Dr. Duffield made a variety of pharmaceutical preparations, including Hoffman’s anodyne and mercurial ointment, but was overwhelmed by the operations of the business.

Dr. Duffield and Hervey Coke Parke formed a partnership in October 1866, with George S. Davis becoming a third partner in 1867. Parke was a businessman looking for business opportunities and Davis, an ambitious man with skills in sales. Duffield withdrew in 1869 because of poor health and an interest in practicing medicine. The partnership adopted the name Parke, Davis or Parke-Davis in 1871, and was formally incorporated as Parke, Davis & Company in 1875.

In 1871, the company sent expeditions to Central and South America and the West Indies in search of medicinal plants. The company produced an herbal laxative drug Cascara found from Native Americans in the Pacific Northwest.

It was once the world's largest pharmaceutical company and is credited with building the first modern pharmaceutical laboratory and developing the first systematic methods of performing clinical trials of new medications. The Parke-Davis Research Laboratory is a National Historic Landmark; the surrounding Parke-Davis and Company Pharmaceutical Company Plant is on the National Register of Historic Places.

In 1912, Parke-Davis pharmacist Wilbur Scoville developed the "Scoville Organoleptic Test" - now standardized as the Scoville scale - to measure the "spiciness" or "heat" of various chili peppers.

The production facility on Parkdale Road in what was then Avon Township, Michigan (now in Rochester, Michigan), was also a landmark in that vicinity and is now used by PAR Pharmaceuticals.

In the 1950s, Parke-Davis employed Jonas Salk as a consultant on vaccine adjuvants. Parke-Davis was also involved in manufacturing the polio vaccine. It took Salk much effort to convince Parke-Davis to follow his production protocols exactly. For about six months, Parke-Davis had the exclusive contract to produce the vaccine for field trials but, in February 1954, the National Foundation for the Prevention of Polio reneged on the contract and opened vaccine production to other companies as well.

Parke-Davis commissioned Detroit illustrator Robert Thom to produce 40 illustrations for the series, “A History of Pharmacy in Pictures.” Each print came with a history article that explained the depicted scene and its place in history. Launched in 1957, the series was developed in cooperation with the Institute for the History of Pharmacy at the University of Wisconsin. Druggists were encouraged to display the artwork in their stores. Thom also did a comparable series on the history of medicine.

In the case of Franklin v. Parke-Davis (2002), the company was accused of illegal marketing practices, including the promotion of off-label uses of its anticonvulsant medication Neurontin. The drug had only been approved for use in patients with epilepsy, but in 2001 over 80% of its $1.8 billion in sales were for indications unapproved by the United States Food and Drug Administration. In 2004, Pfizer "admitted that Parke-Davis aggressively marketed Neurontin by illicit means for unrelated conditions including bipolar disorder, pain, migraine headaches, and drug and alcohol withdrawal", and consented to $430 million in penalties although it claimed the violations originated in 1996, well before Pfizer's acquisition of Warner–Lambert.

On January 22, 2007, Pfizer announced that it would close its research facilities in Ann Arbor, Michigan.

== Products ==
One of Parke-Davis' early products was an amylase isolated from Aspergillus oryzae by Dr. Jōkichi Takamine. The enzyme was originally intended for use in distilleries but was more successfully marketed as "Taka-diastase" for dyspepsia.

Also, Parke-Davis distributed Coley's toxins, the first cancer vaccine, which was developed by William Coley to treat osteosarcoma. Additionally, the company entered into a distribution agreement with the Inoculation Department of St Mary's (London) and distributed a number of vaccines for infectious diseases and even acne and cancer.

Another of the company's products developed by Takamine was a pure form of adrenaline. The compound was patented in 1900 and trademarked as "Adrenalin." Because of the similarity of this name to "Adrenaline," the use of the alternative name "epinephrine" for generics was mandated in the United States and is used to this day. Parke-Davis filed a lawsuit against H. K. Mulford Company alleging infringement of its Adrenalin patents. The ruling in favor of Parke-Davis by Judge Learned Hand is considered crucial to modern patent law.

Parke-Davis was known worldwide for its cannabis products, being even used by Egypt to create a diplomatic incident at the International Office of Public Hygiene, a predecessor of the World Health Organization (WHO).

Like Bayer with heroin; before the criminalization of cocaine, the drug was sold by Parke-Davis in various forms, including cigarettes, powder, and even a cocaine mixture that could be injected directly into the user’s veins with the included needle. The company promised that its cocaine products would "supply the place of food, make the coward brave, the silent eloquent and ... render the sufferer insensitive to pain." In October 1915, Aleister Crowley, author of Diary of a Drug Fiend and The Confessions of Aleister Crowley, stopped by Parke-Davis in Detroit, where, according to Crowley, the cooperation was complete. "[They] were kind enough to interest themselves in my researches in Anhalonium lewinii (peyote) and made me some special preparations on the lines indicated by my experience which proved greatly superior to previous preparations." Parke-Davis also was the original manufacturer and patent holder of phencyclidine (PCP) which is currently listed as a Schedule II drug in the United States. It also developed Ketalar (ketamine hydrochloride), a general anesthetic and dissociative drug, in 1962.

Parke-Davis marketed the first widely available epilepsy treatment, Dilantin, which was approved in 1939, although it discovered neither the compound nor the application on its own.

In partnership with the Japanese firm Daiichi Sankyo Co. and the British firm Glaxo Wellcome, Parke-Davis developed and marketed the anti-diabetic drug Rezulin (troglitazone) in the late 1990s. The drug was withdrawn in the USA in March 2000 because of liver toxicity.

Parke-Davis developed the first bacterial vaccine, and the company was thus known as a pioneer in the field of vaccinology. It was also among the five firms contracted to manufacture the original Salk killed-virus vaccine. A combination of the DPT and polio vaccines, called Quadrigen, was developed in 1954 and approved in 1959. Quadrigen was later removed from the market in 1968 after a series of lawsuits pertaining to adverse effects in vaccinated children. Parke-Davis also produced the broad-spectrum antibiotic chloramphenicol, which was a blockbuster product before the discovery of its association with aplastic anemia.

Other products popularized by the company included anti-infectives and brands of combined oral contraceptive pills.
