= Parks in Windsor, Ontario =

Windsor's Department of Parks and Recreation maintains 3,000 acres (12 km^{2}) of green space, 180 parks, 40 miles (64 km) of trails, 22 miles (35 km) of sidewalk, 60 parking lots, vacant lands, natural areas and forest cover within the City of Windsor, as well as the Bike Trails, Bike Lanes, and Bike-Friendly Streets.

There are 43 individual reserves in Windsor larger than 10 acres (40,000 m^{2}) in size. Seven of these reserves are larger than 100 acres (0.40 km^{2}): Little River Corridor, Malden Park, the Ojibway Prairie Provincial Nature Reserve, Ojibway Park, Spring Garden Prairie, the Roseland Golf and Curling Club and Black Oak Park. Eighteen reserves are larger than 25 and smaller than 100 acres (0.40 km^{2}), including Mic Mac Park, Little River Golf Club, Peche Island, Wilson Park, and the Ford Test Track. A further eighteen reserves are larger than 10 and smaller than 25 acres (100,000 m^{2}).

== Malden Park ==
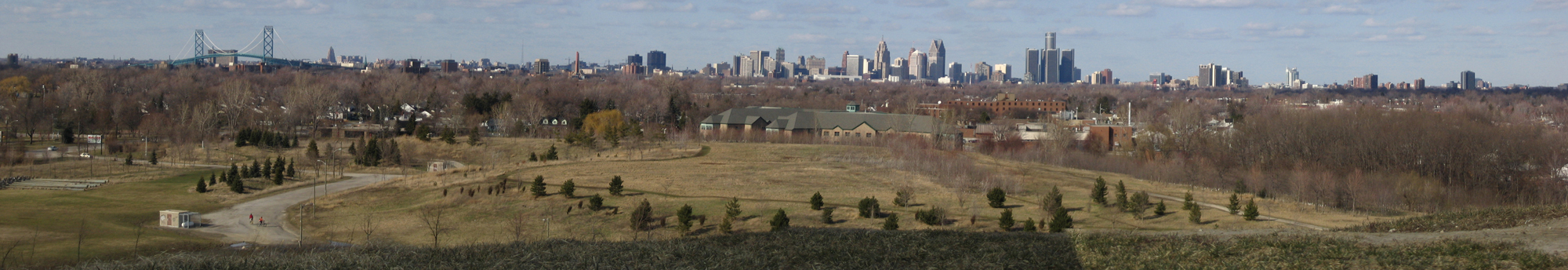
Panorama shot of the Detroit Skyline and the Ambassador Bridge from Malden Park, Windsor

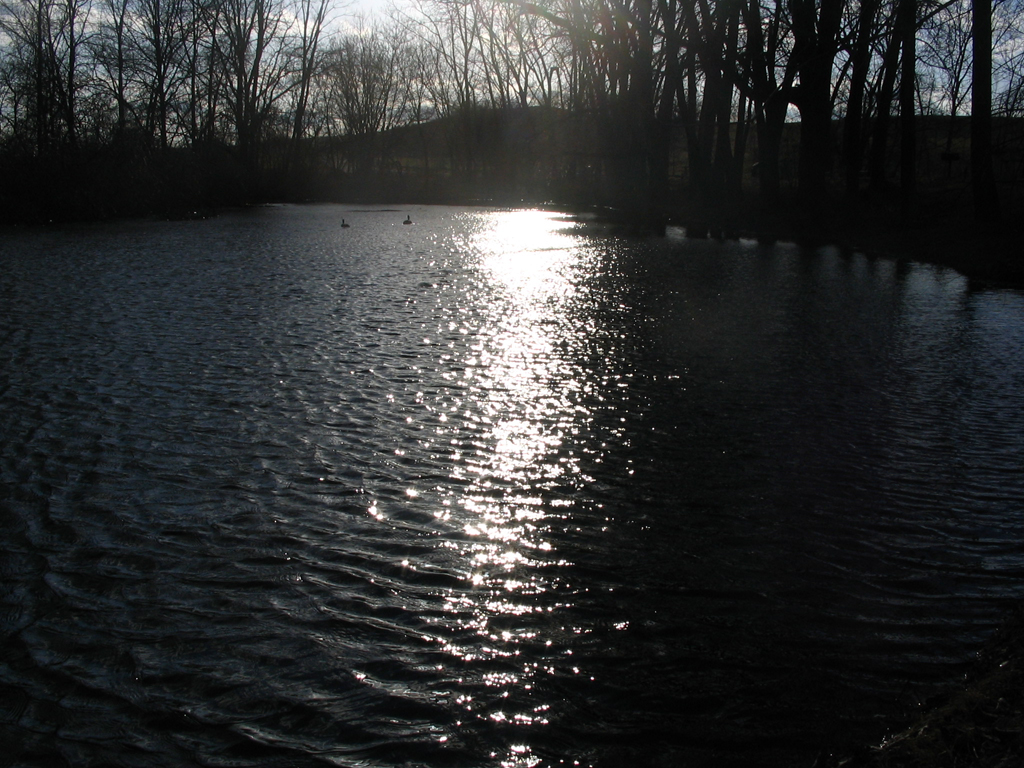
Ducks in lake at Malden Park, Windsor

Across Matchette Road lies Malden Park, a former city dump-turned-park, with a huge 300-foot (90 m) hill, providing views of the Windsor and Detroit skylines, as well as sights of the River Rouge and Zug Island factories. On a clear day, visitors can even see the Enrico Fermi Nuclear Generating Station and the office towers of Southfield, Michigan far off in the distance. Fireworks are also launched from the hill at certain times during the year. Malden Park also contains a number of small artificial lakes, a restroom, woodland trails, and war memorials, tributing Canada's soldiers during both World Wars.

== Ojibway Prairie Complex ==
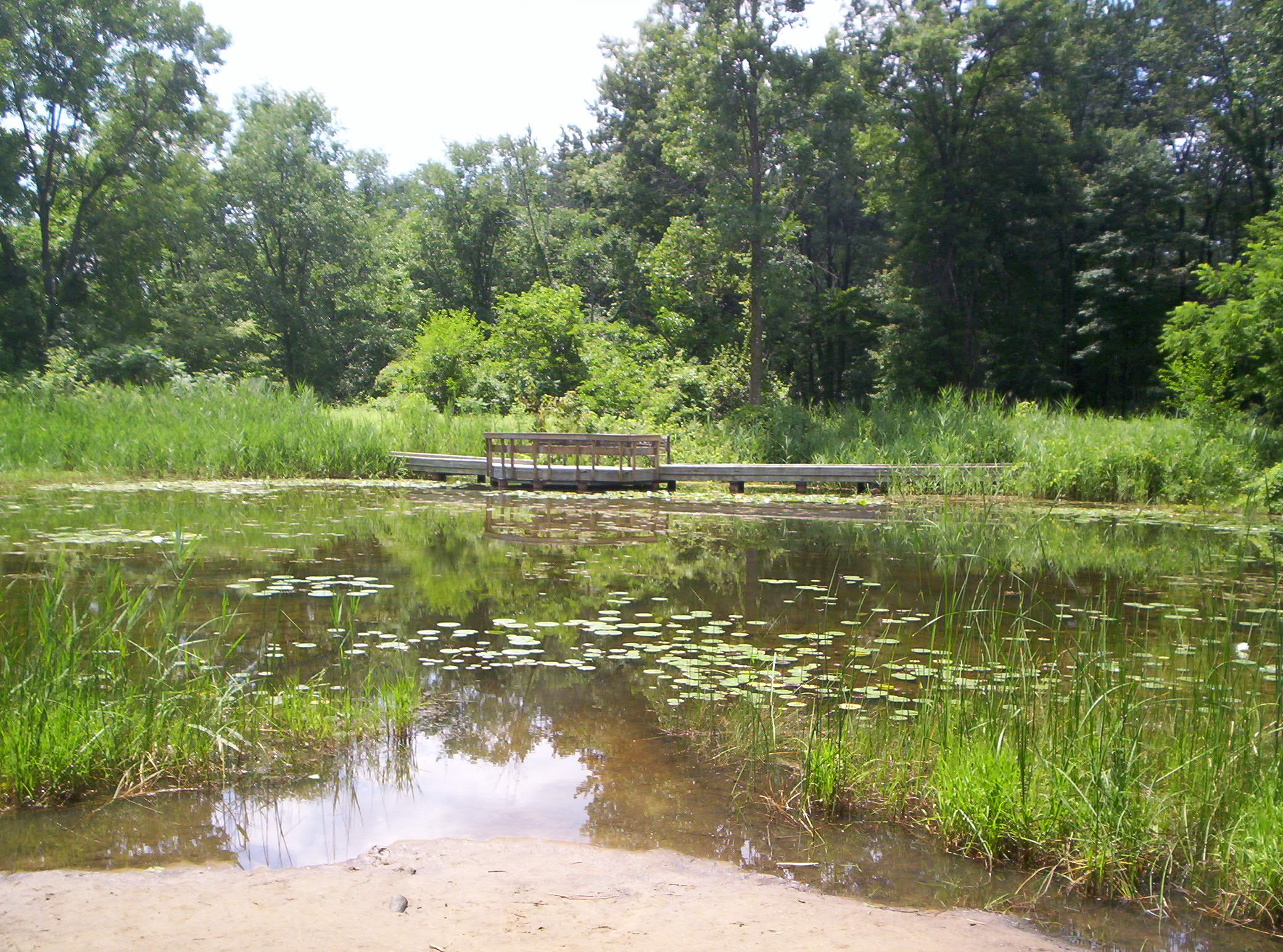
Ojibway

Close to Malden Park, is the large inter-connected park system that is the Ojibway Prairie Complex, popularly known as "Ojibway". The Ojibway Prairie Complex is a collection of six closely situated natural areas in Windsor. The largest of the parks is the Ojibway Prairie Provincial Nature Reserve, which is not a city-maintained park, but a provincially maintained one. It is connected via the bike trails (such as the West Windsor Recreationway) to neighbouring Ojibway Park and Spring Garden Natural Area. Although some city maps display Titcombe Road as a street that goes through, connecting Matchette Road to the west, and Malden Road to the east, it actually was abandoned in the 1960s, and is now a bike trail, ending at two parks and parking lots.

== Sandwich Towne parks ==
In the Sandwich Towne neighbourhood, the Parks and Rec. department maintains two medium-sized parks, the Mill Street Park (complete with windmill and pier), and the Chewett Beach Park (McKee Park), just west of the Ambassador Bridge. The beach at Chewett Beach/McKee Park used to allow swimming until recently, when it was completely redesigned, keeping only the small boardwalk and boat launch. Swimming was strongly recommended against, due to the pollution of the Detroit River and currents caused by passing ships.

== Riverfront parks ==
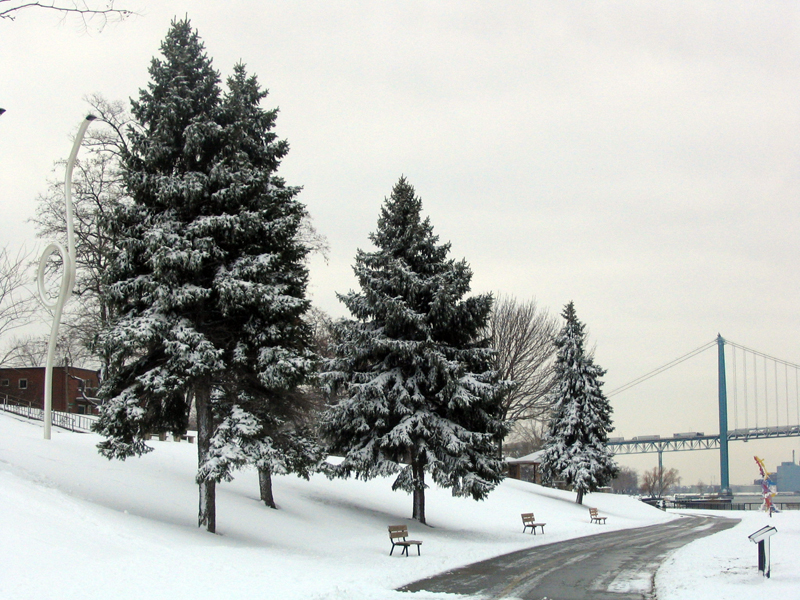
Section of the Riverwalk, Windsor

This collection of parks is now one park, but at one time was several that blended seamlessly together. It goes by many nicknames, such as "Riverwalk", "Riverfront Park" and the "Riverside Park". The parks were gradually converted from numerous rail yards into one long connected park, 3 miles (4.8 km) long, from the foot of the Ambassador Bridge, to Hiram Walker's Canadian Club distillery. The vast majority of the park allows people to fish along its edge. Caution must be taken while riding a bicycle along the Riverwalk trail, due to young children, crowds of people walking, people walking dogs on the bike paths, occasional sharp curves of the bike trail, and the large number of Canada geese and other migratory birds that rest and walk along the parkland and trails. Because of this, a city-posted speed limit of 20 kilometres per hour (12 mph) is in effect on the trail.

=== Assumption Park and the Windsor Sculpture Park ===
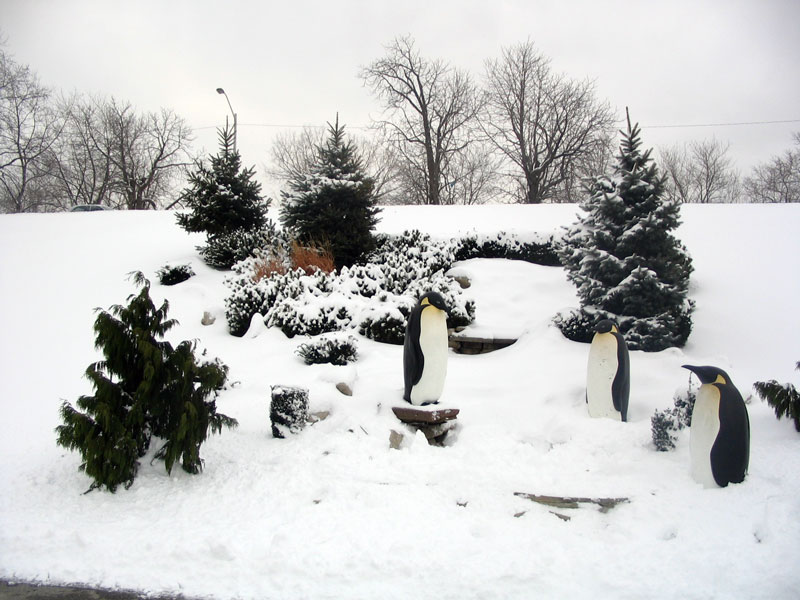
Penguin statues on the Riverfront, Windsor

The first part of the park starts at the foot of the Ambassador Bridge and includes portions of the Windsor Sculpture Par, and a parking lot for people to park their vehicles. The former name of this park was "Ambassador Park", a name now given to the park between the University of Windsor and the Sculpture Park. The park also contains two service centres, a drinking fountain, and a Vietnam War memorial. This park also connects to the Fujisawa Botanical Gardens, a gravel trail and grassed area still under conversion from railway bed, extending south to Wyandotte Street.

=== Dieppe Gardens ===
After the Caron Ave Pumping Station, the park transitions into the Dieppe Gardens, a garden and grassed area between the hotels along Riverside Drive, and the river. Many ships dock along the Gardens, and (Like Mill St. Park, Jackson Park, and the Sculpture Gardens), is a popular destination, especially for news crews. The park also contains several varied war memorials, as well as a monument dedicated towards peace (The UN Peace Memorial).

=== Civic Terrace and Festival Plaza ===
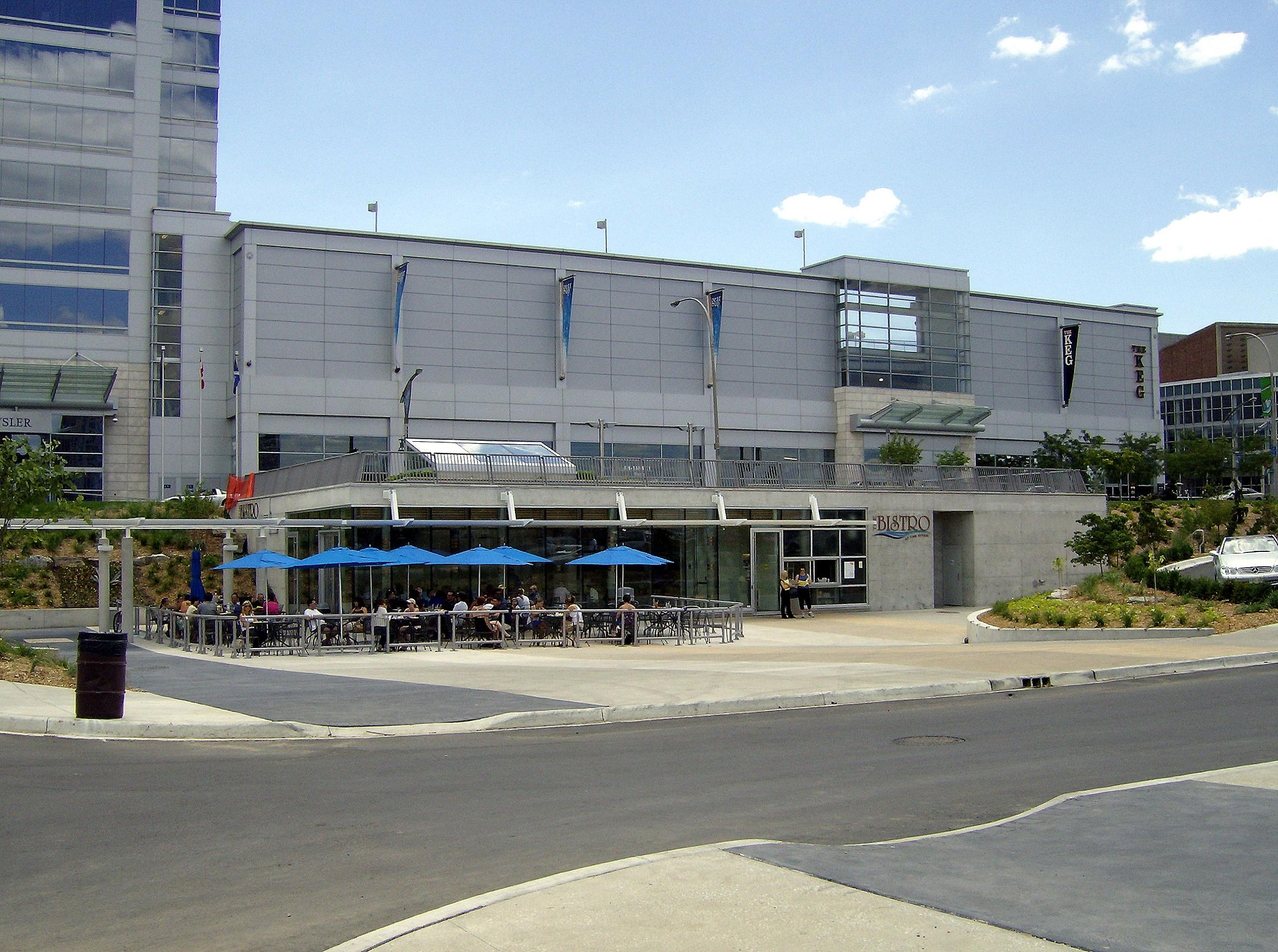
"The Bistro" opened in summer 2007.

Shortly after Dieppe Gardens, the park quickly transitions into a large parking lot for visitors, as well as the large pavilion of Civic Terrace, where small concerts and the annual Busker Festival street performance takes place. It is also the home of the yearly Windsor-Detroit International Freedom Festival. The name of this park is, appropriately "Riverfront Festival Plaza", with the large open paved area named "Civic Terrace".

It also connects to City Hall Square via a smaller plaza and park across the street from Riverside Drive. in front of Festival Plaza are two large ramp structures that are currently being rehabilitated. They are the former decks for loading railroad cars onto ferries, to cross the river to Detroit. They are due to be open to the public by spring of 2007, and are a tribute to our former railroad service along the riverfront. There were similar docks just east of the Sculpture Garden, but they have since been removed, being converted into parkland. The City intends on having plaques about the decks and railroads installed (two are already installed, along with over 30 other plaques along the entire Riverfront Park system), along with benches for people to sit on and enjoy the scenery.

The Festival Plaza also contains The Spirit of Windsor, a Pacific Type 4-6-2 Steam Locomotive. Its Engine number is #5588 and stands where the train station used to be. CN Rail built the engine in Montreal in 1911, and retired it in 1962. The train was donated to the city as a gift for its parkland, and commemorated in 1965. The park also offers coin-operated viewfinders, which allow you 2 minutes of viewing through large binoculars at the Detroit Skyline for just 25 cents. These viewfinders are located along Dieppe Gardens and Festival Plaza.

The Plaza was the site of the former Northern Belle paddleboat casino from New Orleans that the city chose over 3 other boats (one was also a luxury ocean liner from Greece), to house its Casino until Casino Windsor was finished, and the Art Gallery of Windsor was converted back into an art gallery from a temporary casino. The remnants of its docking platform are still visible, as they have been converted into storage rooms and restrooms.

=== Great Western Park ===
After the parking lot at the foot of Aylmer Avenue (Northbound) and Glengarry Avenue (Southbound), the park transitions into Great Western Park. Until as recently as 2000, there was a large turntable, that used to turn locomotives, a relic of Windsor's railroading past.

The Great Western Park contains wide open space for playing many games, along with benches, and completely re-landscaped gardens and bays. The Great Western Park also contains a service centre with murals of railroading-related scenes.

=== Bert Weeks Memorial Gardens ===
The Bert Weeks Memorial Gardens were designed by Windsor architect Michele Di Maio, and are dedicated to former Windsor mayor Bert Weeks. These gardens contain a terraced garden, plaza, font, waterfall, reflecting pool, and a small bridge around a bay, also linking the Detroit-Windsor Tunnel pumping house, via a locked door, with trees and lamps along the trails. A bronze bust of Weeks, created by local sculptor, Christopher Rees, stands on the west side of the garden, with a plaque below the bust describing Weeks's life and contributions to the City of Windsor.

=== Clifford and Joan Hatch Wildflower Garden ===
This wildflower garden is located directly west of the end of the park, along the Hiram Walker Canadian Club distillery, and contains several bays and gardens of wildflowers. A restroom was built into the hill-side below the bike trail, with the roof providing an overhang/lookout to observe the river and Detroit Skyline.

=== Jackson Park, Queen Elizabeth II Gardens, and Windsor Stadium ===
Its walkways are brick-laid, compared to typical concrete, asphalt, tarmac, or even gravel in other parks. The park even used to hold an actual World War II Lancaster bomber. Mounting public pressure caused City Hall to finally take down the bomber, listening to the public's requests to fully restore the bomber and protect it from the elements, and from any further deterioration.

The Queen Elizabeth II Gardens are located in Jackson Park, and are sunken gardens, with flowers, rocks, and a former reflecting pool.

The former Windsor Stadium, used for football, rugby, and soccer, is adjacent to Jackson Park. Former tenants include the Windsor AKO Fratmen and Windsor Stars.

=== Ford Test Track ===
The Ford Test Track in the near-east-end of Windsor was a former proving ground for the Ford Motor Company of Canada. In the late 1980s, the City of Windsor purchased the abandoned test track and converted it into a massive park, with a large pavilion, restroom, and city-operated restaurant, similar to the Queen Elizabeth Service Centre and Restaurant. The park contains a large "race track" where people jog or ride their bikes around the many soccer fields. The path also connects to several streets that formerly went through the park via elegant gates to the trail and street. The Track also has direct connections via Bike-Friendly Streets to Long Park, A.K.O. Park, Milloy Park, and Pykes Park, all within a mile (1.6 km).

=== Coventry Gardens and Pillette Dock ===
Although not a dock per se, Pillette Dock is a spot for many Windsor fishing enthusiasts. Located across from Belle Isle, it provides a view of its largest park. Coventry Gardens is maintained, with hanging gardens, trees, flowerbeds, tarmac and brick paths, and the Peace Fountain, a floating fountain. The fountain is installed from April to October, because exposure to ice and cold would damage it. The park also contains a restaurant and restroom, but bicycles are not allowed in the park, due to its large attendance of pedestrians and tight curves.

=== Roseland Golf Course ===
Although not a park, it is owned by the City of Windsor. It is a popular golf course in South Windsor. The course is a rounded oval in shape. Recently, City Council has been considering selling the Roseland Golf Course and Lakeview Marina in the east end, citing financial difficulties. This confused many residents who read the Windsor Star while this was reported, since both bring in over $C 1.5 million each per year. The Golf Course and Marina remain in city hands, for now, but their future as publicly owned facilities is still unclear.

=== Forest Glade Park ===
This medium-sized park contains the Forest Glade Arena and Community Centre, and the Forest Glade branch of the Windsor Public Library. At one time, it contained a large hill, but it was removed to have a small forest planted, along with baseball diamonds. The City sold off part of the park in 2002, to allow construction of a low-rise apartment building, but the park was not seriously affected, since the City sold off a small portion next to the apartment building back in 1972 to build the local Baptist church.

=== Little River Corridor ===
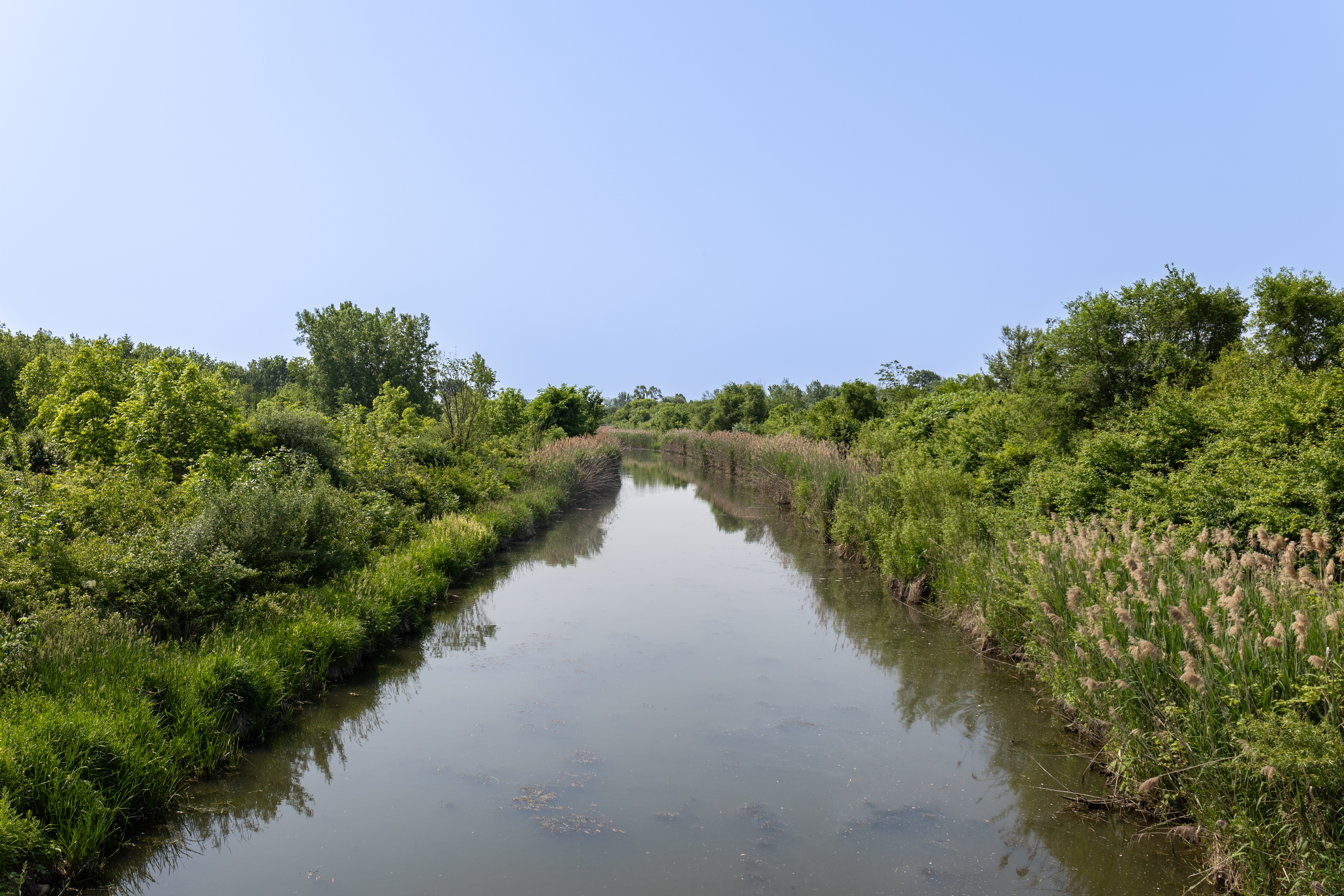
The Little River Corridor follows the Little River

Little River Corridor is one of Windsor's largest and newest parks, coming into being in 1990. It lies along the Little River in the far east end of Windsor, between the villages of Riverside (to the west), Riverside (north, and on both sides), and Forest Glade (to the south). It contains many small streams, a large hill, a few open areas, and many large wooded areas. The park is a popular destination, along with its neighbouring park, Sandpoint Beach.

=== Sandpoint Beach and Stop 26 ===
Sandpoint Beach is Windsor's most popular and family friendly beach destination. It is located in the city's far east side on Riverside Drive East. The beach is officially opened around the Victoria Day weekend in the month of May, through the Labour Day weekend in the month of September. This time frame also sees the beach as being attended by lifeguards between the hours of 1:30 pm and 7:30 pm daily.

There is a newly paved, oversized parking lot that runs alongside the Ganatchio Trail, and both are located directly across the street from the beach itself. The parking lot contains ample parking for hundreds of vehicles, with free overflow lots located very close by.

Beachgoers and sunbathers of all ages attend this community park for some rest and relaxation and leisure time in general. It offers acres of sandy areas, grassy areas, treed areas, BBQ Areas, volleyball courts, a large totem pole, pavilion, restrooms, rinsing shower, drinking fountain, and a snack bar.

The beach portion of Sandpoint lies to the west of the totem pole, and is marked off from the shipping channel by floating markers. Swimming beyond this area is dangerous, as it is located very near a shipping channel and the currents and undertows that lie beyond the buoys are very strong. Stop 26 Beach is a grassier area that lies to the east and is unprotected. While Sandpoint Beach has lifeguards on hand, Stop 26 is generally unmanned, with signs in place cautioning people of the strong currents in the Detroit River and Lake Saint Clair.

Every Winter, Sandpoint Beach is home to the "Polar Bear Dip", a long-running tradition of beach-goers running into the freezing (and often ice-covered) lake and swimming briefly to raise money for charities, or for the local hospitals.

=== Peche Island ===
Only accessible by boat, this island park is fun for picnics and exploration, at the mouth of Detroit River and Lake St. Clair.

=== Lanspeary Park ===
Another of Windsor's Crown Jewel parks, this is the oldest in the city, tied with Mic Mac Park (1917). It features a forest, play ground, open area, plaza, marquee, Outdoor icerink with a roof and even an open-air swimming pool for the public living in the Walkerville and Ottawa Street Village neighbourhoods in Downtown Windsor.

=== Optimist / Memorial Park ===
Optimist / Memorial Park is located in the neighbourhood of Windsor, built in the Interbellum years (1918–1938). It is one of the larger city parks and features a newly restored granite memorial prominently located at the main gates, inscribed with the names of 837 men and women from the Windsor area who died serving in the First World War. It features many pedestrian trails, a soccer field, a baseball field, and a small forest. It is connected via Parent Avenue (and then Shepperd Street) to the rest of the bike trails. The Memorial bike trail connects the park to the intersection of Walker and Grand Marais Roads, where the Windsor - Tecumseh Tornado of 1946 tore through the city.

=== Devonwood Conservation Area ===
While situated in the city limits, this Conservation Area is actually maintained and run by ERCA, the Essex Region Conservation Authority. It is connected to the Devon subdivision (built in the mid-1980s, with expansion going on today) via the Devon Bike Path, linking it to Hall Farms Park and Walker Homesite Park.

=== Remington Booster Park ===
A relatively new park, this park is situated in the centrally located Remington neighbourhood, both of which were built at the end of the 1980s. It contains a large open area, with a small narrow bike trail circling it, with an extension trailing east, through more parks and playgrounds. It is directly connected via bike route to Optimist/Memorial Park. A second bike trail also connects the Remington Booster Park to Langois Court Park, and further east to Southdale Park.

=== Willistead Park ===
Willistead Park is located in the Walkerville neighbourhood, just east of downtown Windsor. The park contains the old Willistead Manor, a mansion built from 1904 to 1906 . Most of the houses that border the park across the streets are stylized in Industrial Revolution-England style, with rounded windows and row-houses with steep roofs. Every year, this park hosts "Art In The Park", in June, a large and very popular arts and crafts show.

=== West-End and Downtown parks ===
The West End of Windsor has a few small to medium-sized parks, such as the Bruce Avenue Park in the middle of Downtown, Wilson Park, with the Adie Knox-Herman Community Centre (built in 1972), which contains a large indoor pool and meeting hall. Another park is the semi-developed South Cameron Woodlot, near a new subdivision in the middle of the West End. Kildare Park is located on Kildare Avenue, near the General Motors Transmission Plant, close to the newly re-built Factoria Park, along Factoria Avenue and includes part of a reclaimed abandoned rail line.

Mitchell Park on Giles Boulevard and Bruce Avenue is relatively large and also sees many residents visiting it. Nearby Wigle Park on Church Avenue is well-used, being in a central location (downtown).

Atkinson Park located on Riverside Dr. West and Bridge Ave. is a 6.2-acre (25,000 m^{2}) park. It contains an outdoor (seasonal) pool, an intermediate size soccer field and a 100 by 150 feet (30 by 46 m) skateboard park. Future additions to the park in the fall of 2006 – summer 2007 includes a 1/4 mile (~400 m) walkway, a boundary free play equipment and easier access into Atkinson pool....

=== Other parks ===
Meadowbrook Park is right across the stream from the Little River Golf Course, and is the largest in the Forest Glade community.

Other large parks in the city include Realtor Park, A.K.O. Park, Milloy Park, Pykes Park and Polonia Park in the Pilette neighbourhood, Cora Greenwood Park, Lakeshore Woods and East Riverside Park in the far east end, and Derwent Park along the Little River (also called "Lauzon Park" on the eastern side of the river), near the Place Concorde centre and the Forest Glade community.

The subdivision of Southwood Lakes has a few medium-sized parks as well. The nearest large parks are the Devonwood Conservation Area, Ojibway Park in southwest Windsor, and Oakwood Park, home of the Pulford/South Windsor Arena. Nearby, Curry Avenue Park and Central Park provide relaxation for residents in South Windsor. Shepherd Park is located on Shepherd Road, next to the Windsor Medical Centre, and across the street from the Alphonsus Cemetery, which (if included with the neighbouring cemeteries) is the largest in the city.

In the Devon neighbourhood, the main parks are the Devonwood Conservation Area, Hall Farms Park, Walker Homesite Park, and Seymour Park (on Seymour Drive, and not connected by bike trail to the others).

== Bike trails ==
=== Introduction ===
Other attractions in Windsor includes its shared-usage trail network, named the "Windsor Loop" (of which, all the trails are a part of) that circumnavigates around the entire city and connects to neighboring communities. The longest of the shared-usage trails in the network is the paved Roy A. Battagello River Walk, (built in the late 1960s, and upgraded/widened several times), stretching from west of the Ambassador Bridge to the historical Hiram Walker Distillery, a distance of around 5 miles (8.0 km). The trail also connects to other trails leading to Ojibway Park and Ojibway Prairie Provincial Nature Reserve, Malden Park, Spring Garden ANSI (Area of Natural Scientific Interest) via signed bike routes, more shared-usage trails and dedicated bike lanes, starting along the riverfront in the Sandwich Towne Neighbourhood (Russell Street Neighbourhood Trail), via Brock, College, and Prince Streets, ending nearby to La Salle's bike trail network (the "LaSalle Trail" network including Brunet Park). The Riverwalk trail currently ends at George Avenue and Wyandotte Street, after splitting at Riverside Drive and Strabane Avenue, with a branch heading into Alexander Park. Another shared-usage section of the trail is the Ganatchio Trail, which is indirectly (and temporarily) linked to the Riverwalk trail by Wyandotte Street. The Ganatchio Trail travels along the east side of town, with a branch heading south towards Forest Glade. It starts at the corner of Lesperance Rd. and Riverside Dr. in Tecumseh and goes all the way to Wyandotte St. The two trails are projected to be linked together through extensions or new trails, as intended by City Council.

Wyandotte Street is not listed as an official Bike Route, but has many signs along it from the Ambassador Bridge to its terminus with Riverdale Street in the Villages of Riverside neighbourhood, saying "Share The Road: Bikes Belong", with a symbol of a car and a bike next to each other, as if it were a bike-lane road. This is supposedly to help City Council eventually lay bike lanes down to connect Ganatchio Trail to Riverwalk trail, and as a reminder for motorists, since Wyandotte Street is very busy with commercial AND residential traffic. Whenever University Street, Riverside Drive, or the Riverwalk trail are closed, Wyandotte is typically used as an alternate, and as a result, it is beyond capacity and it is heavily traveled for basically all of its length being a major east-west artery, despite going through the heart of downtown Windsor, and intersecting the Detroit-Windsor Tunnel Entrance at Goyeau Avenue.

The City of Windsor is slowly working towards connecting the Riverwalk to the Chrysler Canada Greenway with designated routes. The route starts at Parent Avenue, with some dedicated bike lanes and shared-usage trails, with the route signed to Devonwood Conservation Area and the Devonwood Bike Trail. There is a short ride west on Cabana Road to the dedicated southbound bike lanes on Holburn St. or simply ride directly south on 6th Concession. Turn east on North Talbot Road and after crossing Walker Road watch for the entrance to the Chrysler Canada Greenway.

The speed limit for major shared-usage trails is 20 kilometres per hour (12 mph), unless posted otherwise, and 40 kilometres per hour (25 mph) or higher on Bike Lanes, matching the speed limit of the road the lanes are on.

=== Other bike trails ===
The city also maintains numerous other bike trails, such as the Ganatchio Trail (built in 1971), its Little River Extension (connecting Forest Glade to Sandpoint Beach and Stop 26 park, built in 1996), and numerous bike lanes on city roads, and bike-friendly roads (signed with a green sign with a bike symbol, with "ROUTE" below). Another important bike trail is the Devonwood Bike Trail (built in the mid-1980s in stages, final extension completed around 1992), which runs through the Devon subdivision to the forest-covered Devonwood Conservation Area. It has been speculated that this could be a connection from the Riverfront Bike Trail, along the trails and Lanes along Parent Avenue, to the Chrysler Canada Greenway segment of the Trans Canada Trail, which runs to Ruthven, Ontario in Kingsville, Ontario, 3 miles (4.8 km) east of Leamington, Ontario. The Riverwalk trail has also seen TCT signs appear along its western segment from the Ambassador Bridge to Dieppe Gardens, and along the Peter Street Bike Route (where they meet at the University of Windsor), south along Brock Street and the College Avenue Bike Trail, down through Mic Mac and Malden Parks.

=== Further information ===
Windsor City Council has repeatedly expressed its full intentions on completing the bike trail/bike lane network, linking all separate parts, and has started doing so by marking bike lanes on streets and building new trails. One main difficulty is how to link the Riverwalk trail (Ambassador Bridge to Hiram Walker's) to the Ganatchio Trail in the east end. One plan is to add Bike Lanes to Wyandotte Street until a bike trail can be constructed. Many of the trails are currently interconnected by low-traffic "Bike Friendly Routes", which are just quiet residential streets near bike trails and parks, and Bike Lanes, along busier main roads, with signs to denote bike lanes, their beginnings, and ends. The city claims to be preparing to link to the Chrysler Canada Greenway via the West Windsor Recreationway, linking to the La Salle Trail, and through the town of La Salle, Ontario to the Trans-Canada Trail.

Recently, the Windsor Star and a few of the Detroit television stations have reported the City of Detroit wanting to build a bike trail network similar to Windsor's, stretching from Hart Plaza, along the Renaissance Center, to Chene Park and Belle Isle, and even considering a ferry across the river for cyclists and pedestrians. The ferry idea has since stalled, and in light of recent security increases along the border (combined with the introduction of mandatory passports along the border), this probably will not happen for a long time, if ever.

One common sight on the Riverwalk trail is to see many people walking or riding bikes at the same time. The trail serves a dual purpose of exercise/recreation and commuting, since many people have chosen to use their bicycles instead of their cars (which has started to save the City of Windsor money in road repair costs). In the summer, the trail is so busy and so well-used, it can seem "congested" or "backed-up" at times, from all the pedestrians and cyclists.

=== Grand Marais Bike Trail ===
See main article: Grand Marais Trail.

=== Riverfront Trail ===
See main article: Riverfront Bike Trail.

=== Ganatchio Trail ===
See main article: Ganatchio Trail.

== Signs ==
Share The Road Signs, commonly found along busy roads, such as Wyandotte Street

Indicates that the lane is reserved for exclusive use of bicycles. This is designated by a lane marking separating the portion of road used by motor vehicles from the portion of road used by bicycles (Separated by a solid white line)

Older bike route signs, still very common in Windsor, and some are still being erected, albeit at a slower pace than newer ones, as shown above

== See also ==
- Cycling in Detroit
- Trails in Detroit
- Reaume Park
- Riverfront Bike Trail
- Ganatchio Trail
- Little River Extension
- Trans-Canada Trail
- Russell Street Neighbourhood Trail
- Royal eponyms in Canada—locales in Canada named for royalty akin to Queen Elizabeth II Gardens in Windsor
