= Thunder Drome! =

The Thunderdrome! is a group that holds races at the Dorais Velodrome in Detroit, MI
