= Trails in Detroit =

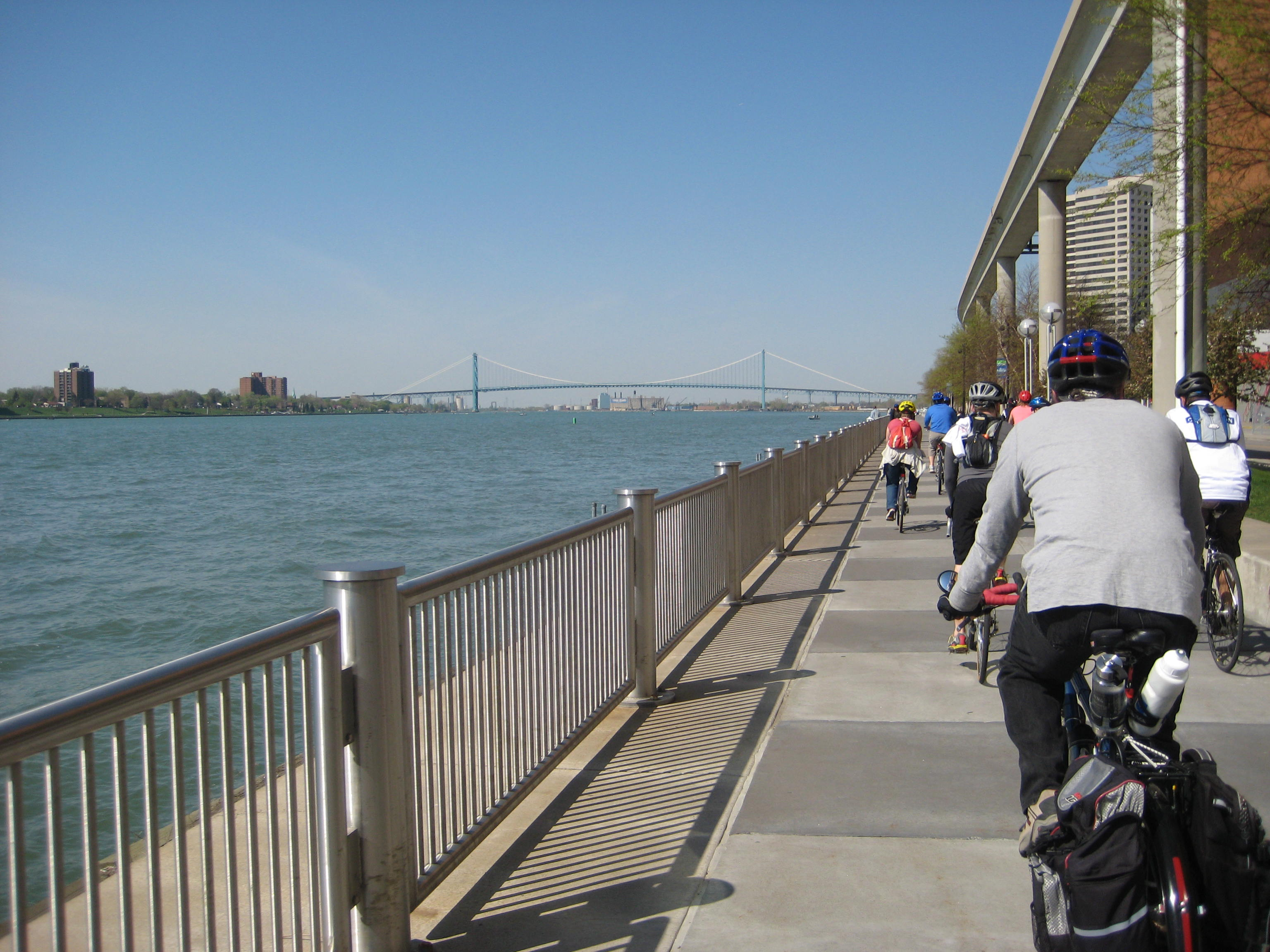
Bicycling on the Detroit RiverWalk

This is a list of trails and greenways in Detroit.

The trail types vary from natural surface singletrack to asphalt shared-use paths. In many cases, trail projects include on-road bike lanes and signed shared road routes.

== Detroit Greenways Vision ==
The Detroit Greenways Coalition is a group of stakeholders and city officials that meets monthly and promotes greenway development within the city. This Coalition has developed a Detroit Greenway Vision which calls for over 70 miles (110 km) of greenways throughout Detroit. That vision also includes bike lanes to bridge gaps between the greenways and to connect with neighborhoods. These bike lanes are a subset of the over 400 miles (640 km) of bike lanes proposed within the Detroit Non-Motorized Transportation Master Plan.

== Major trails ==
=== Conner Creek Greenway ===
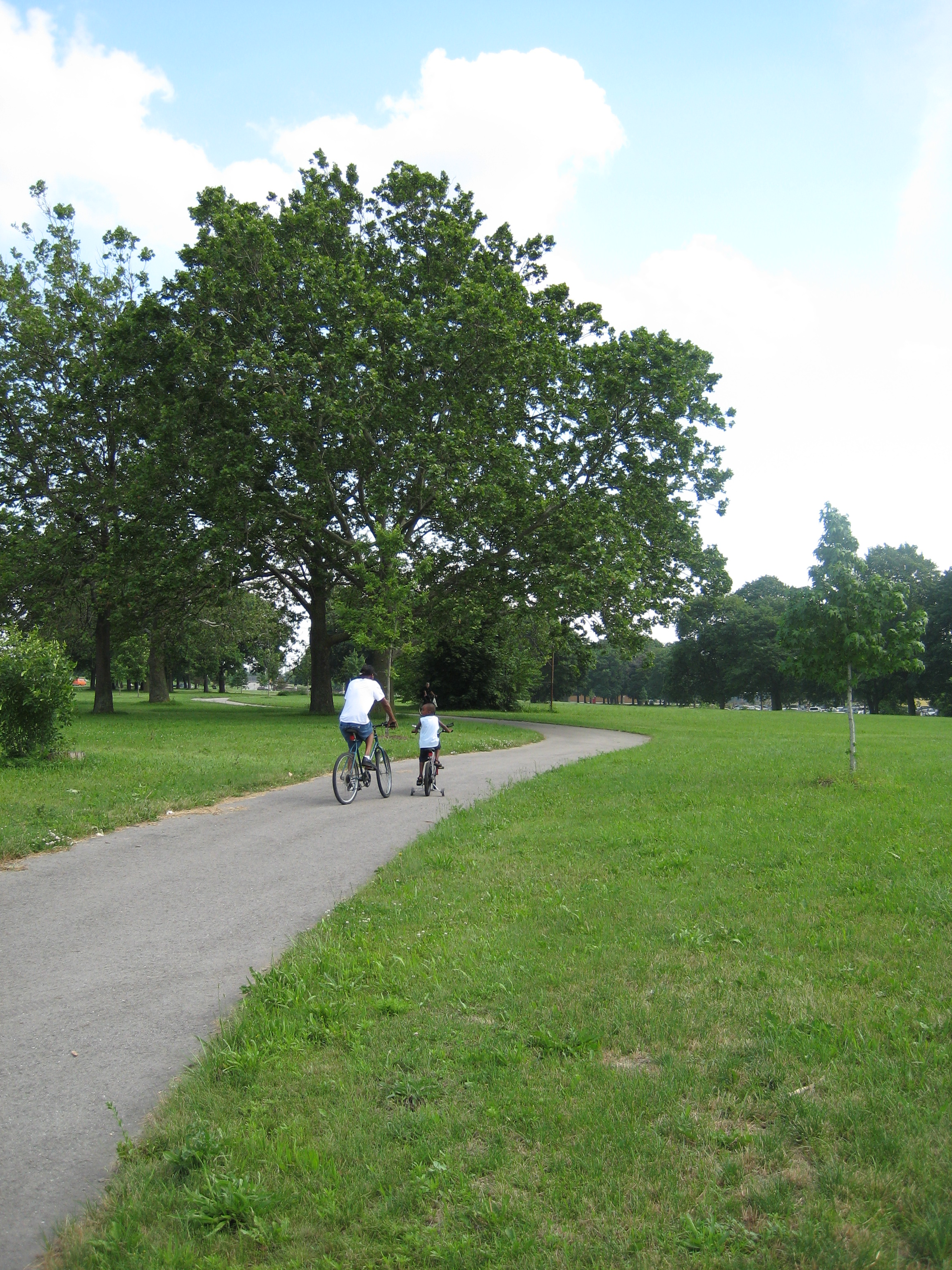
The Conner Creek Greenway through the Conner Playfield

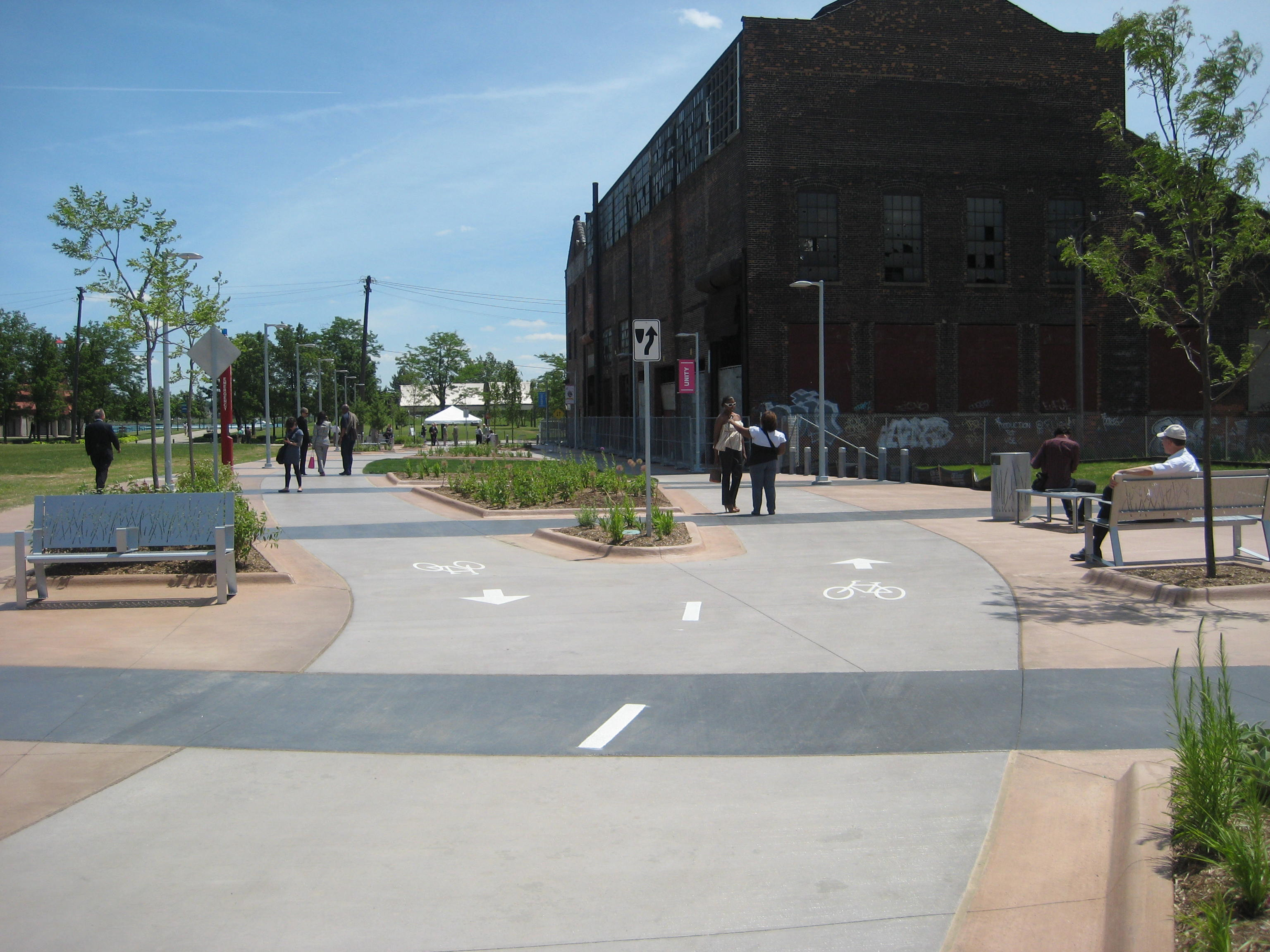
Dequindre Trail and the Globe Building

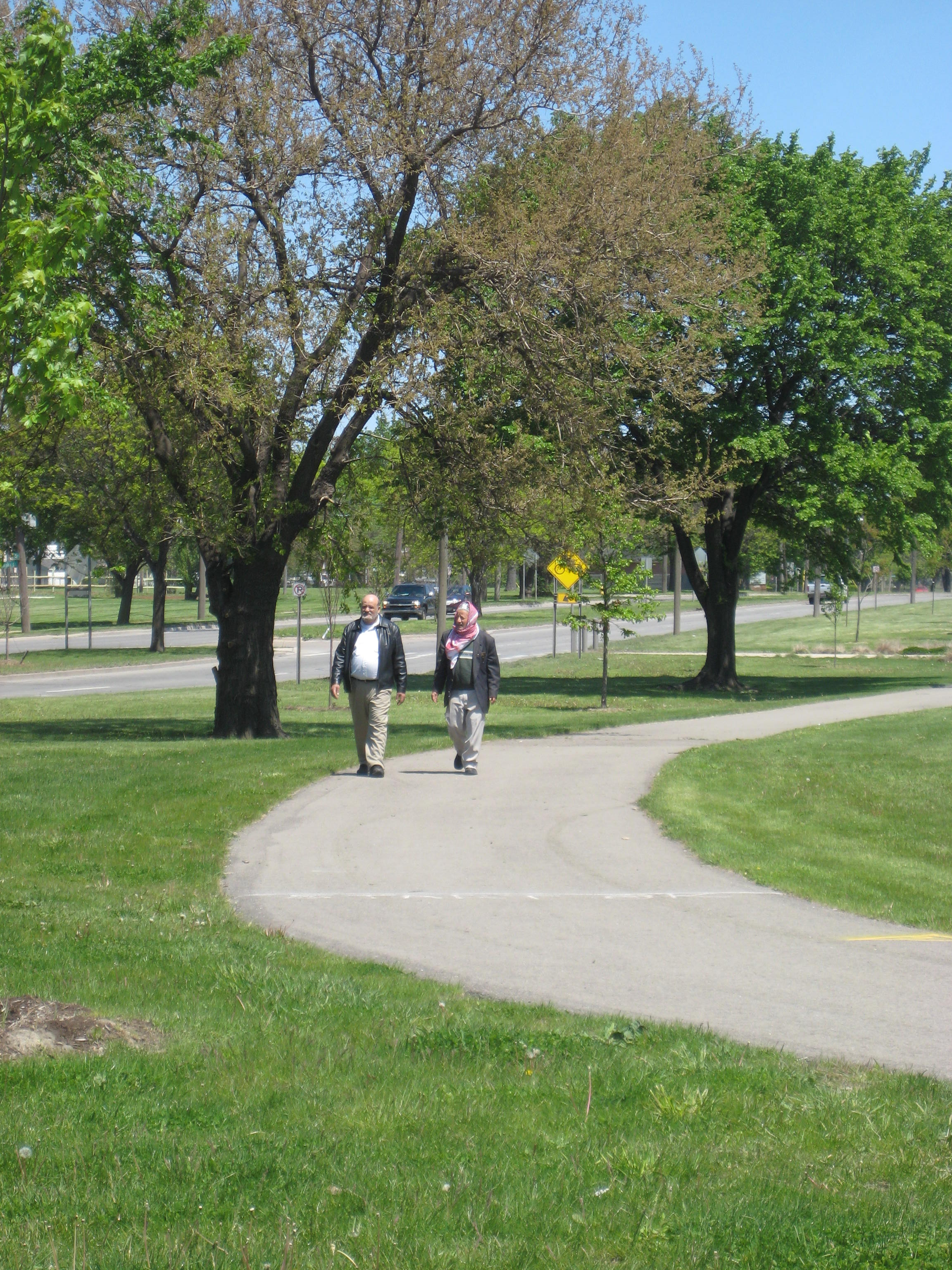
Southwest Detroit Greenway in Patton Park

The Conner Creek Greenway is located on Detroit's east side. When completed, it will stretch nine miles (14 km) from M-102 (8 Mile Road) south to the Detroit River, tracing the original Conner Creek. The greenway makes use of shared-use paths, bike lanes, and bike routes. It begins at Maheras Gentry Park (on the Detroit River), travels north past the Detroit City Airport, and up to Eight Mile Road.

The Milbank Greenway is also considered part of the Conner Creek Greenway. The Milbank Greenway provides a short connection between Van Dyke Avenue and Conner Avenue just north of Outer Drive. The greenway uses an undeveloped road right-of-way and includes many gardens along its length.

The bike lanes along Van Dyke Avenue between East Outer Drive and Eight Mile Road are part of the Conner Creek Greenway. Those bike lanes continue north into the city of Warren.

This bicycling portion of the Iron Belle Trail also uses the Conner Creek Greenway starting on St. Jean north of Kercheval Avenue.

=== Corktown/Mexicantown Greenlink ===
The Corktown/Mexicantown Greenlink is a network of nearly 20 miles (32 km) of bike lanes and 11 miles (18 km) of signed sign roadways. This network is throughout Detroit's Corktown and Mexicantown neighborhoods. The Greenlink connects with the Southwest Detroit Greenway using W. Vernor Highway. While this project was originally conceived and planned through the Greater Corktown Development Corporation, it is now a product of the Southwest Detroit Business Association.

The Michigan Department of Transportation (MDOT) added bike lanes to U.S. Highway 12 (US 12, Michigan Avenue) between Livernois and Rosa Parks Boulevard. Those were upgraded to protected bike lanes and extended to Cass Avenue. MDOT also built a pedestrian bridge over Interstate 75 (I-75) connecting Bagley Street. Though technically not part of the greenlink, the bike lanes and bridge provide additional connections to the greenlink network.

=== Dequindre Cut ===
The Dequindre Cut is a below-grade pathway located on the east side of Detroit just west of St. Aubin Street. The trail is currently completed between the Detroit River Walk/Milliken State Park (at Atwater Street), Eastern Market, and Mack Avenue. One highlight of this greenway is its colorful graffiti.

=== Detroit River Walk ===
The Detroit River Walk is a 5 1/2-mile (8.9 km) promenade along the Detroit International Riverfront running from the Ambassador Bridge to Belle Isle. Three miles (4.8 km) of river walk are now completed. The river walk connects many parks, including Hart Plaza, Chene Park, Mt. Elliot Park, and the William G. Milliken State Park and Harbor. This greenway provides views of Windsor, Ontario, as well as passing freighters. Pavilions, fishing piers and benches are located at intervals along the path.

=== Lyndon Avenue Greenway ===
The Lyndon Avenue Greenway is a 1 1/2-mile (2.4 km) route in Detroit's Brightmoor neighborhood and runs between Eliza Howell Park and Stoepel Park. Besides connecting the two large area parks, the greenway also includes many pocket parks. This segment of Lyndon Avenue will have bike lanes added once the greenway is completed.

=== Midtown Loop Greenway ===
The Midtown Loop will be a two-mile (3.2 km) greenway trail that will follow existing street patterns, specifically following Kirby Street, John R Street, Canfield Street, and Cass Avenue with Warren Avenue serving as the central connector. The loop will be linked to greenway initiatives in surrounding areas, providing a key component of a larger greenway network linking Midtown to Eastern Market and the Dequindre Cut. The Loop will also connect the campuses of Wayne State University and the Detroit Medical Center.

Phase 1 of the project is completed along Kirby and John R. It was funded through ARRA. Phase 2 will be along Canfield and Cass. Additional construction will connect the Midtown Loop to the Dequindre Cut.

Significant public art is planned for the greenway. According to the University Cultural Center Association—the organization responsible for the Loop, "the public art component will elevate this greenway to the level of becoming a tourist attraction."

Note that the Midtown Loop is designed primarily as a wide sidewalk and is therefore best suited for pedestrians or bicycling at modest speeds. Bicyclists traveling at higher speeds will likely prefer riding on the adjacent road.

=== Southwest Detroit Greenway ===
The Southwest Detroit Greenway stretches from the M-85 (Fort Street) bascule bridge (over the Rouge River, through the West Vernor Business District, to Clark Park. The greenway includes a shared-use path through Patton Park and a signed bike route to Dearborn's Lapeer Park, both of which are completed. This greenway connects with the Corktown/Mexicantown Greenlink on the east, the Detroit River Walk on the south, the Claytown-Michigan Avenue Greenway on the north, and the Downriver Delta Greenways on the west.

A major portion of this greenway consists of the bike lanes along West Vernor Avenue. Streetscaping and wayfinding are planned for this West Vernor segment.

== Trails within city parks ==
=== Belle Isle ===
Nature trails are provided through the wet-mesic flatwoods on the island. These are enjoyed throughout the year. There are also bike lanes on the island's outer roads and on the MacArthur Bridge.

=== Lafayette Park and Elmwood trails ===
The Lafayette Park and Elmwood neighborhoods include internal public parks which have paved paths. These paths connect the residential areas with surrounding streets.

=== Palmer Park ===
Palmer Park has a paved shared-use path loop that begins at the pool area, goes through the center of the park, along 7 Mile Road and back along Merrill Plaisance. There are also unpaved foot trails through the forested areas which were recently reopened.

=== Rouge Park Trails ===
There are approximately six miles (9.7 km) of paved pathways through Rouge Park. In addition, the Michigan Mountain Biking Association and Student Conservation Association have developed a hiking/mountain bike singletrack trail.

== Planned trail projects ==
=== Downriver Delta Greenways ===
The Downriver Delta Greenways are conceptual non-motorized links within Detroit's 48217 communities. These links provide a key connection between the Southwest Detroit Greenway, the Rouge Gateway Project, and the Downriver Linked Greenway Initiative.

=== Belt Line Greenway ===
The Gleaners Food Bank is currently studying the feasibility of building a greenway along the abandoned rail corridor just east of Beaufait from the Detroit River to Gratiot Avenue. This greenway would connect the Detroit River Walk, Capuchin Soup Kitchen/Earthworks, and the Gleaners Food Bank. This project has also been called the Gleaners Greenway and Beaufait Greenway.

=== Joe Louis Greenway ===
The Joe Louis Greenway (formerly called the Inner Circle Greenway) is a planned 27.5-mile (44.3 km) loop that circles the city of Detroit while connecting Dearborn, Hamtramck, and Highland Park. The primary segment is a 7.5-mile (12.1 km) abandoned Conrail railroad corridor. The Joe Louis Greenway also uses other existing or planned greenways including the Dequindre Cut, Southwest Detroit Greenway, and Detroit River Walk.

=== Claytown-Michigan Avenue Greenway ===
Bridging Communities is currently leading efforts to develop a Claytown-Michigan Avenue Greenway Plan. This plan will provide the residents and stakeholders of Claytown community (north of Southwest Detroit) with a common design and future goal of improved beautification and non-motorized transportation.

=== New Center Greenway ===
The New Center Council has developed a non-motorized transportation plan for New Center which includes a proposed rail with trail. That trail, called the New Center Greenway would be approximately 1.6 miles (2.6 km) and would be located on unused portions of the railroad right-of-way running through the middle of New Center.

=== Villages GREEN Project ===
The Greater Riverfront Eastside Environmental Network (GREEN) is a non-motorized planning project led by the Villages Community Development Corporation. The GREEN project has identified a number of potential greenways which include shared-use paths and bicycle boulevards. The project also includes a proposed extension of Detroit River Walk. This extension heads upstream from Gabriel Richard Park to Detroit's eastern border at Alter Road.

== Water trails ==
=== Detroit Heritage River Water Trail ===
In September 2006, Metropolitan Affairs Coalition (MAC) released plans for the Detroit Heritage River Water Trail, the first water trail planned for Southeast Michigan and the only one developed along a river designated by both Canada and the United States as a Heritage River. The Detroit Heritage River Water Trail is a river version of a greenway trail (or “blueway”) and will provide opportunities for canoeing, kayaking, and small boat paddling. Note that current city ordinances prohibit the launching of kayaks and canoes from Detroit city parks. The Michigan Trails and Greenways Alliance and Riverside Kayaks are working with the city to remove this restriction.

== See also ==
- Cycling in Detroit
- Bike trails in Windsor, Ontario
