= Dorais =

Dorais may refer to:

- Dorais Park, Detroit, Michigan
- Dorais Velodrome, formerly abandoned, outdoor velodrome part of Dorais Park

== People ==
- Andrew "Andy" Dorais (b. 1982), American ski mountaineer
- Benoit Dorais, city councillor from Montreal, Quebec, Canada
- Charles Emile "Gus" Dorais (1891–1954), American football player
- Jason Dorais (b. 1982), American ski mountaineer
- Louis-Trefflé Dorais (1835–1907), merchant and political figure in Quebec
