= Chestnut Street Bridge =

Chestnut Street Bridge could refer to:

- Chestnut Street Bridge (Philadelphia)
- Chestnut Street Bridge (Detroit)
