= Cycling in Detroit =

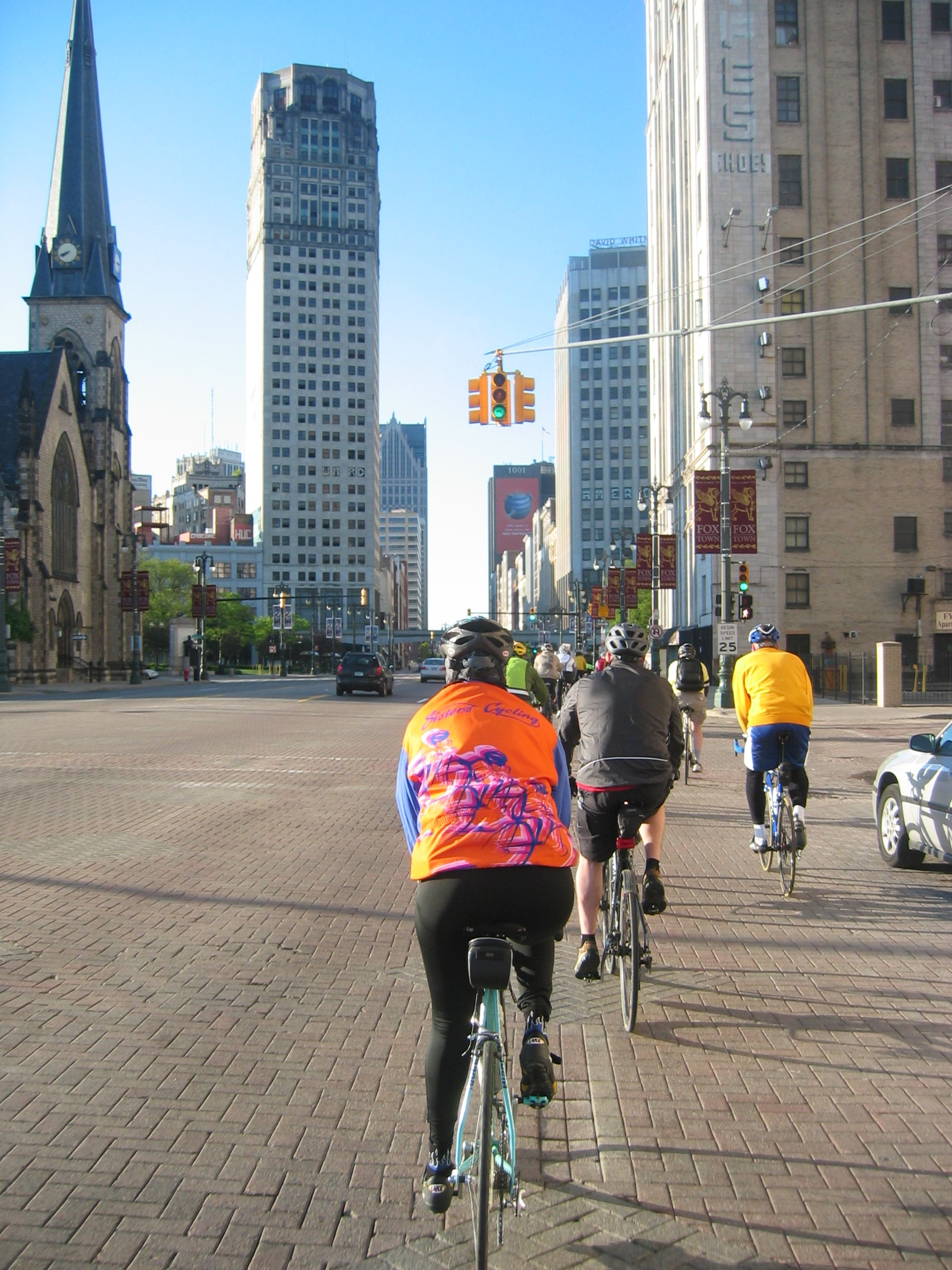
Bike to Work event on Woodward Avenue

Detroit is flat with an extensive road network and a number of recreational and competitive opportunities for cycling. The city has invested in greenways and bike lanes and other bicycle-friendly infrastructure. Bike rental is available from the riverfront and tours of the city's architecture can be booked.

The city has a cycling heritage, and first embraced cycling during the "golden age" of the 1890s.

== Infrastructure ==
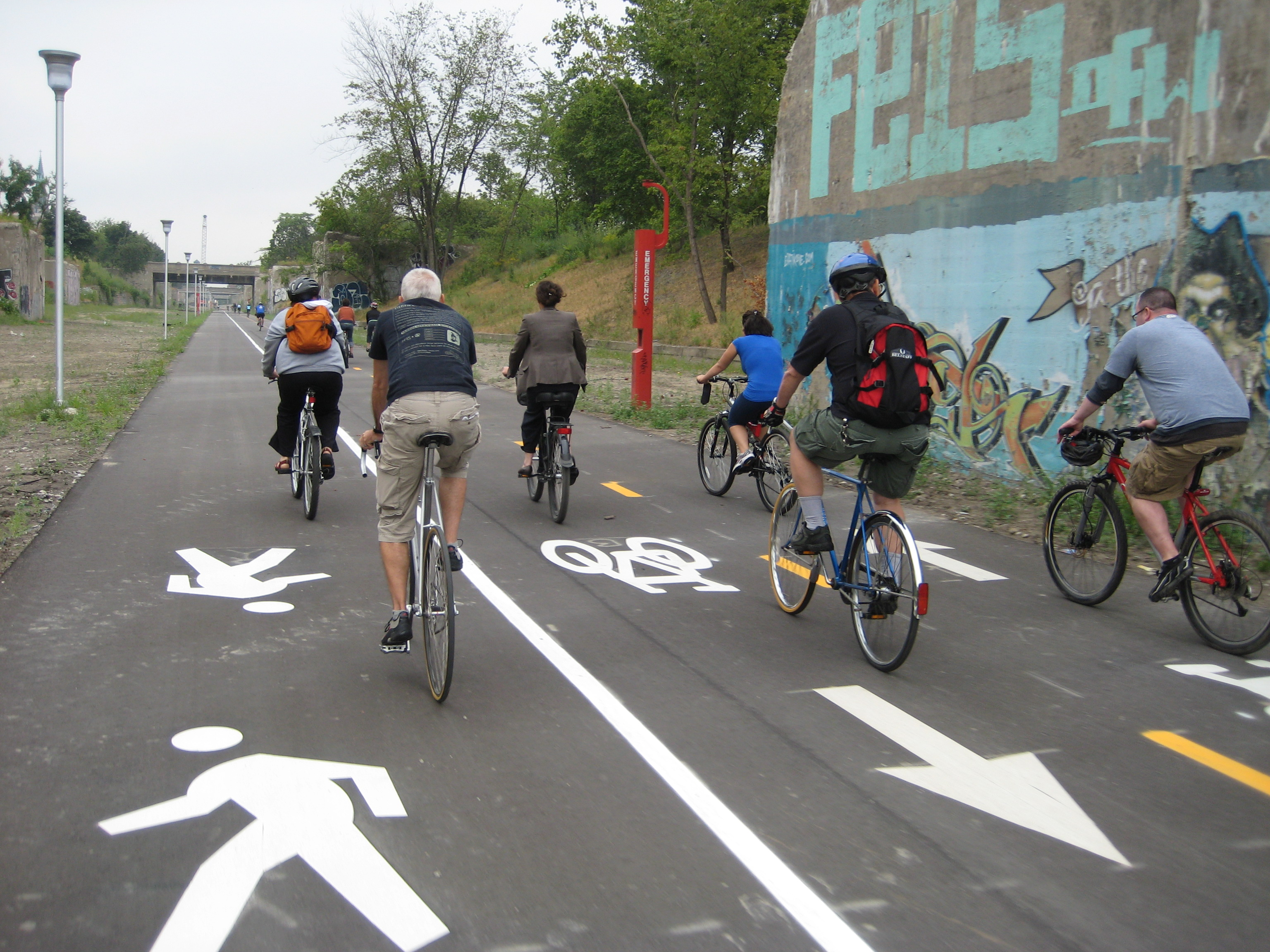
Dequindre Cut

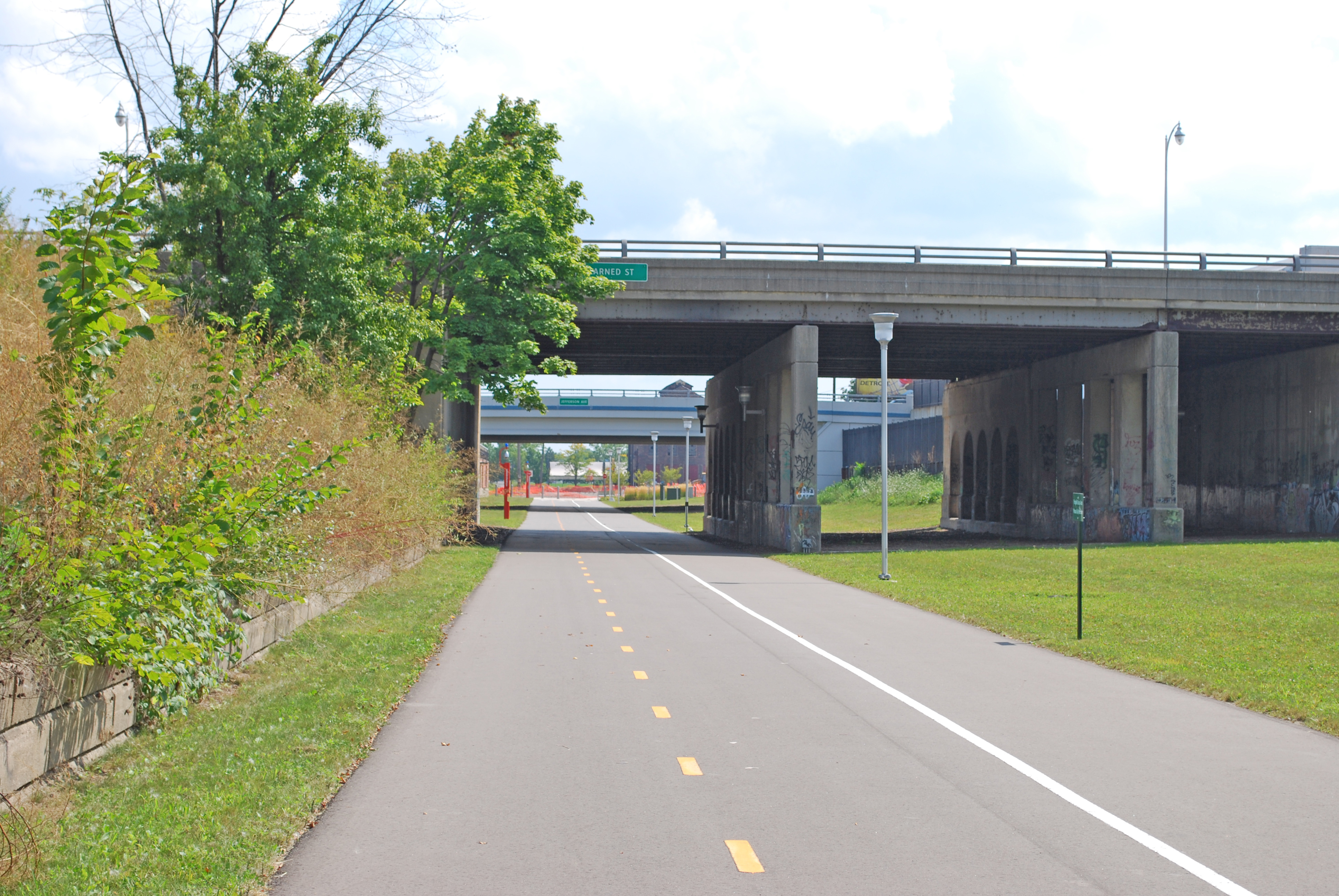
Dequindre Cut, looking south

=== On-road Infrastructure ===
Detroit has a flat terrain and has a number of plans to further develop the cycling infrastructure. It installed its first bike lanes along portions of Atwater Street as part of the Renaissance Center redesign of 2002/2003. The Atwater plans were never fully realized.

As of early 2012, there are over 43 miles of bike lanes in Detroit, including 6 miles on Belle Isle Park and about 20 miles throughout Southwest Detroit; there are also in-park shared-use paths at Rouge Park, Palmer Park, Patton Park and throughout the city parks in the Lafayette-Elmwood neighborhoods. The Dequindre Cut, a major greenway designed for cycling, links to the Detroit International Riverfront which also allows cycling along the waterfront. Portions of the Conner Creek Greenway on Detroit's east side are also completed.

Though still in the early planning stages, United States Bicycle Routes 25, 30, and 36 provide connection through Detroit.

The 'Detroit Non-Motorized Master Plan' calls for 400 miles of bike lanes primarily through road diets. The plan's implementation was started in summer 2009 with initial projects completed in 2010.

The Detroit Health and Wellness Promotion Department (DHWP) is leading the effort to educate the community and elected officials on the value of Complete streets. Groups are working to bring a Complete Streets ordinance before the Detroit City Council by summer 2012.

The Adventure Cycling Association together with Michigan Trails, Greenways Alliance and the Michigan Historic Trails Commission has developed a new 400-mile spur through Detroit to the existing 2,100-mile 'Underground Railroad Bicycle Route' which follows historic Underground Railroad sites from Mobile, Alabama to Owen Sound, Ontario in Canada. The tour map from Oberlin, Ohio to Marine City, Michigan via Detroit is completed. A shorter route just within Detroit has been developed and a brochure is planned.

=== Trails and greenways ===
The 'Detroit Greenway Network' is currently under development and would create a citywide network of greenways encompassing more than 70 miles of greenways and use additional miles of bike lanes (based on the City's non-motorized plan) for on-road connections. This Network would also provide connections to other neighboring and regional efforts.

=== Bikes and transit ===
Buses on the city's main transit systems, DDOT and SMART, are equipped with bike racks capable of holding two bicycles. Maximum tire width is limited to about 2.4 inches, so these racks cannot be used by semi-fat and fat bikes with inflated tires. The Detroit People Mover and QLINE allow bicycles to be brought onto their trains.

=== International crossings ===
Riders may cross between Detroit and Windsor on the Gordie Howe International Bridge, free of charge. The shared pedestrian/bike path may be closed due to inclement weather.

The Ambassador Bridge was open to bicycles and pedestrians from its opening in 1929 but was closed in 2001. The Detroit-Windsor Tunnel does not allow bicycles either, though bicycles can be brought on Transit Windsor's Tunnel Bus.

=== Recreational and competitive facilities ===
The Michigan Mountain Biking Association and Student Conservation Association developed a hiking/mountain bike trail in Rouge Park on Detroit's west side. This 3-mile trail is beginner to intermediate singletrack.

The Detroit Fitness Foundation built the Lexus Velodrome at Detroit's Tolan Park in 2017 which opened to the public in January 2018. The outdoor Dorais Velodrome is no longer suitable for track racing.

== Bike sharing ==
Detroit has a public bicycle sharing system called MoGo, which launched in May 2017. Prior to MoGo, there was Zagster bike sharing within the downtown area that was limited to employees of Quicken Loans and their affiliated companies.

== Events and tours ==
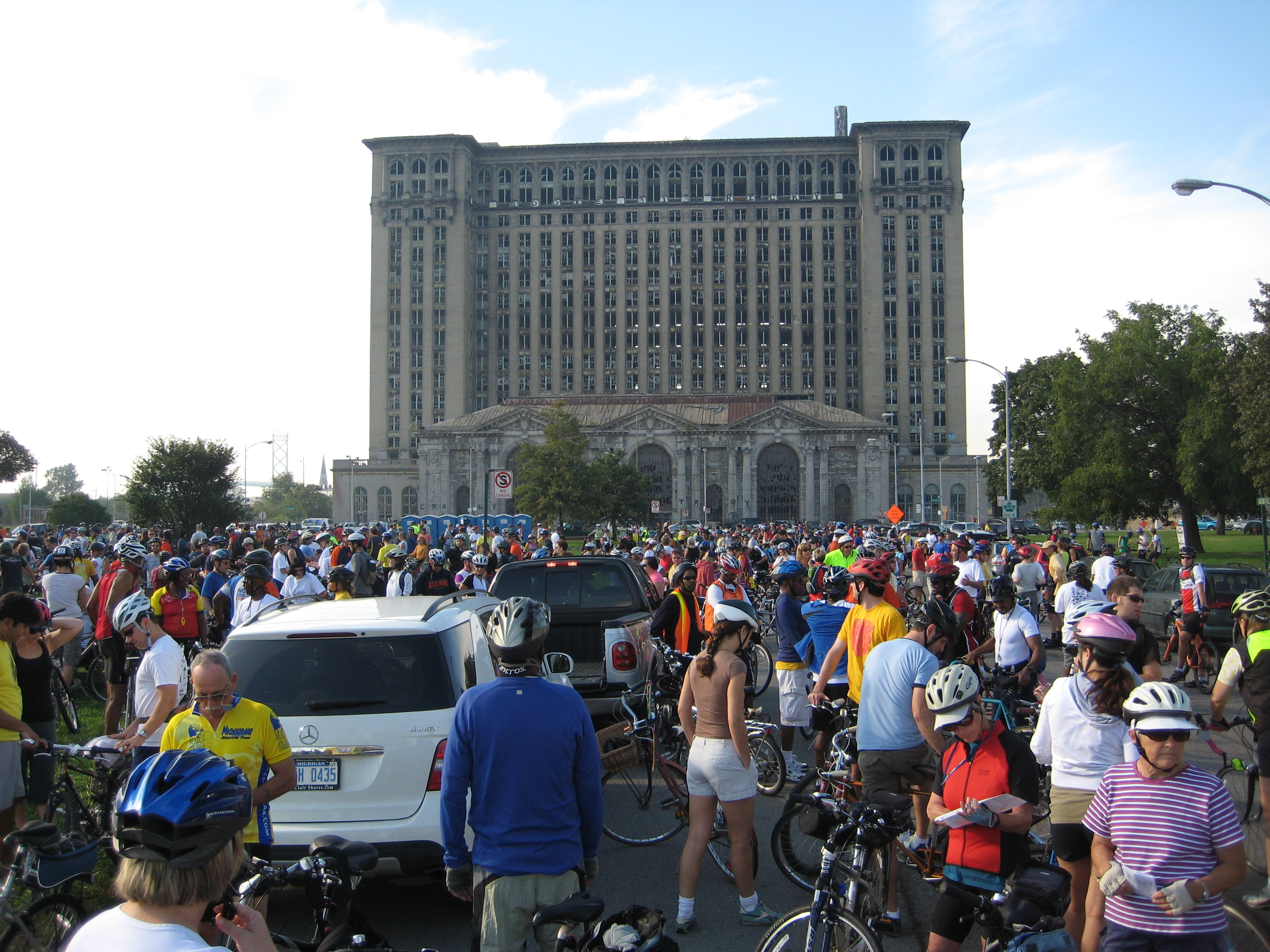
2008 Tour de Troit

- Beat the Train - 6 am Saturdays April through October at Fort Wayne.
- Bike the Blizzard - An annual 24 hour charity bike-a-thon on Sunday before MLK Day
- 'Bike the Bridge' - Cycle rides across the Ambassador Bridge.
- Bike to Work Day - This annual Detroit Greenways Coalition event is part of the national Bike-to-Work Day effort.
- Criterium Detroit City - The inaugural race was July 9, 2010.
- Critical Mass - the last Friday of each month. An estimated 375 people took part in June 2010.
- Detroit Invitational Cyclocross (DICX) - The Inaugural event was December 4, 2010 presented by the Racing Greyhounds cycling club out of Livonia Michigan. The event was intended to thumb its nose at more pretentious races sanctioned by the UCI and includes unusual barriers (felled trees, piles of snow, hay bales, etc..) Heckling and hand-ups are encouraged.
- Detroit Agricultural Network Tour - Guided bike tours that highlight Detroit's urban agriculture.
- Fender Bender - A monthly LGBT bicycle education and training evening.
- The 'Mad Anthony Cyclocross race' is held in the fall at Historic Fort Wayne.
- Ride of Silence A slow-paced bicycle ride on the third Wednesday each May to honor cyclists killed or injured while cycling on public roadways.
- Slow Roll - This is a large slow ride that occurs every Monday and can attract over a thousand cyclists.
- Tour de Ford - A bicycle ride fundraiser for the Henry Ford Health System
- Tour de Troit - One of the largest bicycle tours in Michigan with over 7,000 cyclists participating in 2012.
- Wolverine 200 - An annual endurance event held each spring on Belle Isle. This event has not been held since 2008.

== Proposed developments ==
The following three greenway projects would link the Detroit International Riverfront through Corktown and Mexican Town to connect to the River Rouge and from there up-river to the River Rouge Park and The Henry Ford.

- Corktown-Mexicantown Greenlink
- Southwest Detroit Riverfront Greenway
- Rouge Gateway Greenway

Other proposals include:

- Conner Creek Greenway (and Milbank), a nine-mile pathway along Conner and St. Jean from Eight Mile Road to the Maheras Gentry Park on the Detroit River.
- Detroit Rivewalk
- Fort Street Greenway.
- Hamtramck Greenway, a 1.5-mile link to connect Downtown Hamtramck with the Dequindre Cut.
- Lyndon Avenue Greenway, a 1.5-mile section of Lyndon Avenue.
- Midtown Loop Greenway, a 2-mile greenway trail following Kirby Street, John R Street, Canfield Street, and Cass Avenue.
- Southwest Detroit/Dearborn Greenway, paved pathways through Patton Park and around Lapeer park with an on-road signed bike route to connect the two.

== Organizations and Clubs ==
- Babes on Bikes Detroit - Weekly bike ride for ANY/ALL women and enby [non-binary] folx.
- Cass Tech Bicycle Club
- Center for Creative Studies Cycling club.
- Critical Mass - Critical Mass is a huge bike ride that takes place in Detroit! Anyone and everyone is welcome to come. All ages and all bikes (or skateboards, roller skates, unicycles, etc.) are welcome!
- Cruise: Detroit - LGBTQIA+ group ride in and around Detroit
- Detroit Greenways Coalition
- Detroit Randonneurs
- Downriver Highriders
- Eastside Riders Bike Club
- Fender Bender Detroit - A women, queer, and trans* justice-based bike shop and mechanic training experience in the Cass Corridor
- Grown Men on Bikes (G.M.O.B.)
- The Hub at Back Alley Bikes - Wednesday Rides - Organized ride where cyclists with all kinds of experience can participate. The goal is to grow as a rider, and as a biking community.
- m-bike - Bicycling advocacy site for Metro Detroit.
- League of Michigan Bicyclists
- Metro 313 Cyclones - a Major Taylor club
- Metropolis Cycles - A weekly Monday night ride that starts at Metropolis Cycles.
- Michigan Trails and Greenways Alliance (MTGA)
- Michigan Mountain Biking Association
- Midnight Marauders - We like to ride at night! When the city is ours and we don’t have to worry about asshole drivers as much. We will be bombing through the streets of Detroit.
- Morning Cranks
- People for Palmer Park - Enjoy riding (weather permitting) with a fun group of cyclists around the periphery of the park, through the neighborhoods of Palmer Park Apartment District, the Golf Club neighborhood, Ferndale, New Center, Boston Edison, and more.
- Sisters Cycling (Detroit) - Cycling club for women in the metro-Detroit area.
- Soul Roll - One of the oldest Bike Clubs in Detroit.
- Sunday Flyers - We are promoting female leadership in the Detroit biking community…We peddle hard and party hard.
- Taylor Cycling Association - resident riding club for city of Taylor MI 48180
- Trek Detroit Thursday e-ride - All eTransportation is welcome. eBike, One Wheel, you name it. NO GAS power allowed.
- Wayne State University Cycling Club
- Wolverine Sports Club

== History ==
Velocipedes preceded highwheeler and safety bicycles on Detroit's streets. Ben Fletcher rode the first velocipede in Detroit on December 18, 1868. Velocipedes were "in common use" by 1875.

The Detroit Bicycle Club was formed in 1879 when "only a few persons in Detroit rode." By 1890, the club merged with the Meteor Bicycle Club and the Star Bicycle Club to become the Detroit Wheelmen. The Unique Cycling Club (1894 to 1911) was the women's equivalent to the Wheelmen and often shared their clubhouse.

In 1891, the League of American Wheelmen held their annual meeting on Detroit's Belle Isle.

In 1896, the Detroit Wheelmen boasted 450 members and built a $40,000 clubhouse near Grand Circus Park. Famous Detroit Wheelmen include John F. Dodge, Horace E. Dodge, William E. Metzger, Truman H. Newberry, Horatio Earle, Tom Cooper (driver) and Edward N. Hines.

Also in 1896, Henry Ford bicycled behind as Charles Brady King drove the first gasoline automobile in Detroit. Ford drove his first car, called the Quadricycle, just 3 months later. His vehicle was built using various bicycle components, including four bicycle wheels.

Detroit's bicycle shop owners, manufacturers, racers, and enthusiasts became the city's automobile pioneers.

=== Wolverine Sports Club ===
The Wolverine Sports Club (WSC) originated in 1937 as a touring and racing club. The club's headquarters became Mike Walden's Continental Bike Shop in Detroit, and followed the shop's moves ending up in Hazel Park. In 1949, a board of directors was established to guide the club philosophically. Other sports that were a part of the club at this time were: hockey, boxing, track and field, speedskating, and cross country skiing. In 1950 WSC merged with the Berkley Speedskating Club and grew considerably in size. In 1972, cross-country skiing was added as a major sport and the club assumed its current form and became known as the Wolverine Sports Club. WSC was voted the United States Cycling Federation Club of the Year in 1991. Up to that time 28% of all National medal winners came from WSC. In 1997 the WSC became a non-profit 501(c)(3) corporation.

== See also ==
- Transportation in metropolitan Detroit
- Trails in Detroit
