= The North Wall =

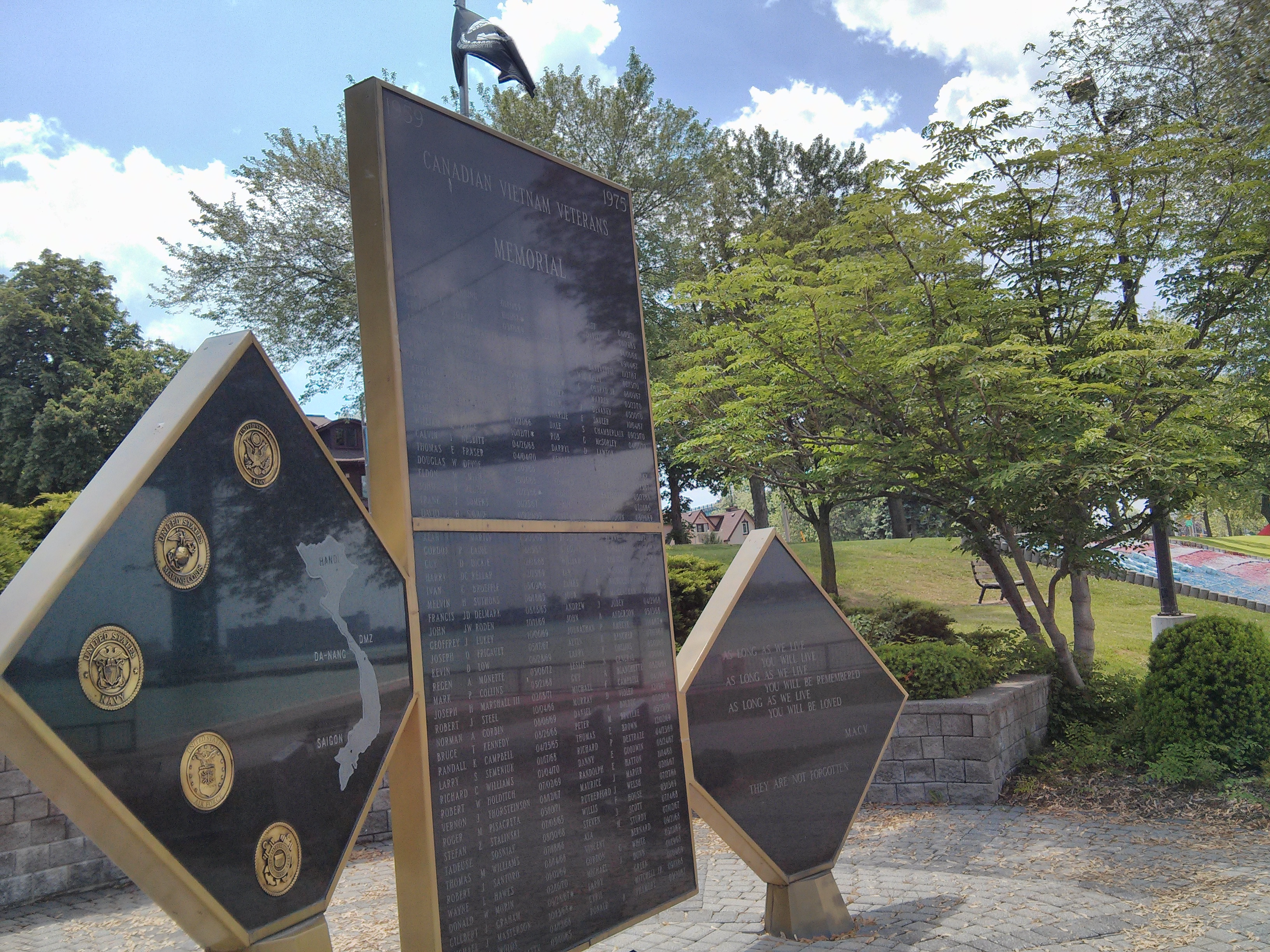
- The North Wall
- Interactive map of The North Wall
- Location: Windsor, Ontario, Canada
- Coordinates: 42°18′37.36″N 083°04′11.06″W
- Type: War memorial
- Opening date: July 2, 1995

The North Wall, also known as the Canadian Vietnam Veterans Memorial, is a war memorial in Windsor, Ontario, Canada. The monument was erected on July 2, 1995 in honour of the Canadian veterans who were killed in action, made prisoners of war, or declared missing in action during the Vietnam War.

== Description ==
There are 173 names currently listed as casualties of known Canadian origin on the North Wall, with 9 listed as POW/MIA. The monument is 14 ft (4.3 m) wide, 11 ft (3.4 m) tall, and weighs 3 tons. The inscription reads:

As long as we live, you shall live.
As long as we live,
You shall be remembered.
As long as we live, you shall be loved.

The monument is in Assumption Park directly across from Detroit, Michigan under the Ambassador Bridge, which spans from Detroit to Windsor.

== Background ==
Canada was officially a non-belligerent during the Vietnam War. However, around 30,000 Canadian citizens enlisted with the United States Armed Forces in order to serve during the Vietnam War. These Canadians had to list a U.S city as their place of birth or residence because the Canadian Foreign Enlistment Act (1937) states: "Any person who being a Canadian national, whether within or residing outside Canada voluntarily accepts or agrees to accept any commission or engagement in the armed forces of any foreign state at war with any friendly state, is guilty of an offence of this act."

== History ==
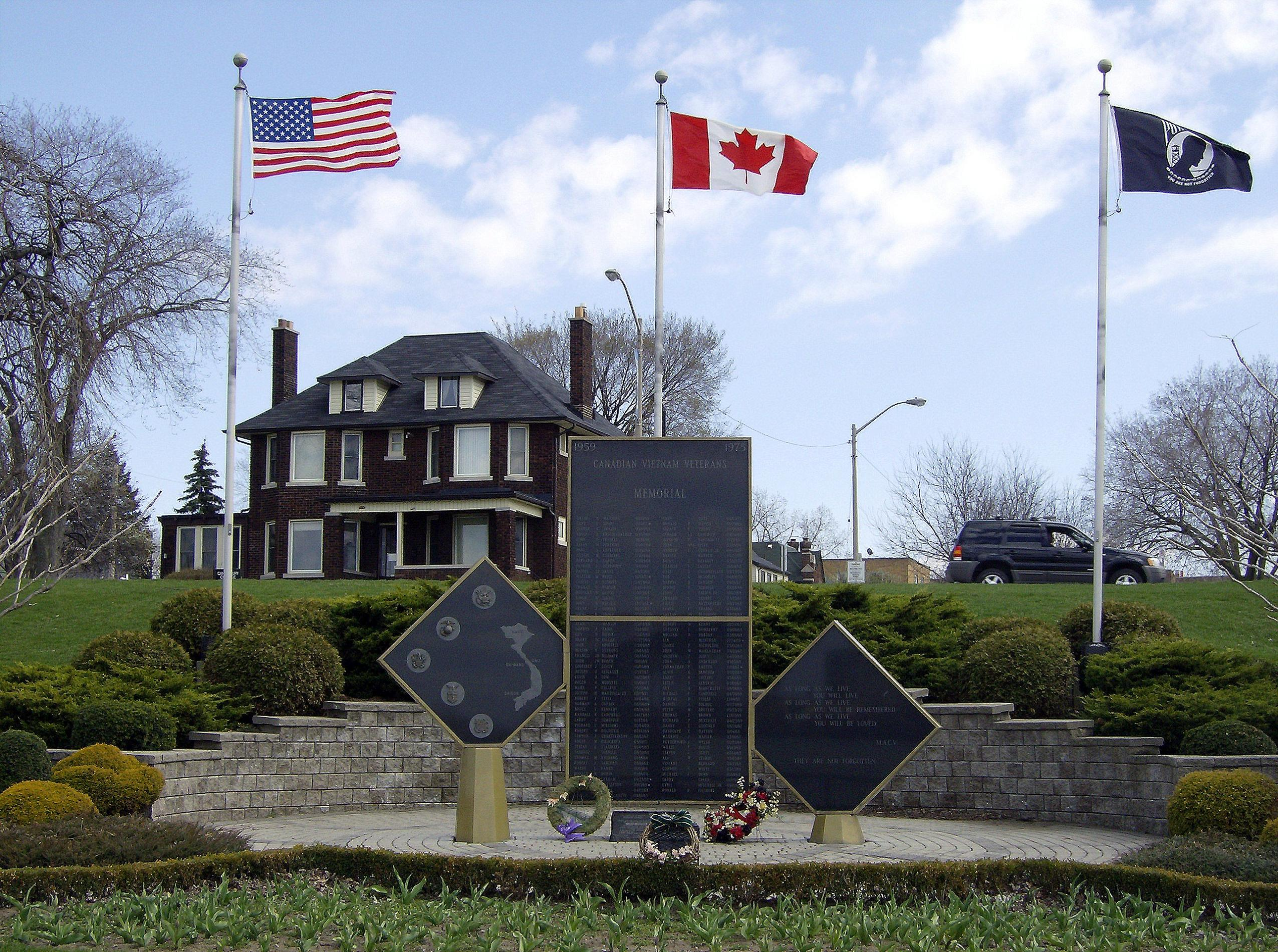
The Canadian Vietnam Veterans Memorial in Windsor, Ontario.

In 1986, the Canadian Vietnam Veterans' Welcome Home Committee was formed by American Vietnam War veterans Ric Gidner and Ed Johnson. Gidner and Johnson were inspired by Canadian Vietnam Veterans that they met during the 1980s, and formed the committee to have a monument created and dedicated to the Canadian veterans. The Committee was later renamed the Michigan Association of Concerned Veterans (MACV). Gidner, Johnson, and Chris Reynolds formed committees with Canadian organizations and campaigned to have the Canadian federal government erect a memorial in the capital, Ottawa, Ontario. In 1994, however, a Bill to erect the memorial failed to pass through Parliament. In the meantime, the members of the MACV used private funds to pay for building a memorial from black granite, the same material used for the United States' Vietnam Veterans Memorial in Washington, D.C. In 1995, the office of the Mayor of Windsor, Michael Hurst, contacted MACV about locating the memorial in Windsor. The City Council of Windsor passed the initiative, and the memorial was dedicated on July 2. Canadian and American veterans' organizations attended the dedication, as did Canadian Senator Jack Marshall and Michael Hurst.

Every year since the opening dedication in 1995, a ceremony and laying of wreaths has been officiated over and attended by prominent Canadian and U.S officials, veterans on both sides of the border, family members of those whose names are on the memorial, and supporters of the project.

== See also ==
- Canada and the Vietnam War
- Canadian war memorials
