= Antietam Avenue Bridge =

- U.S. National Register of Historic Places
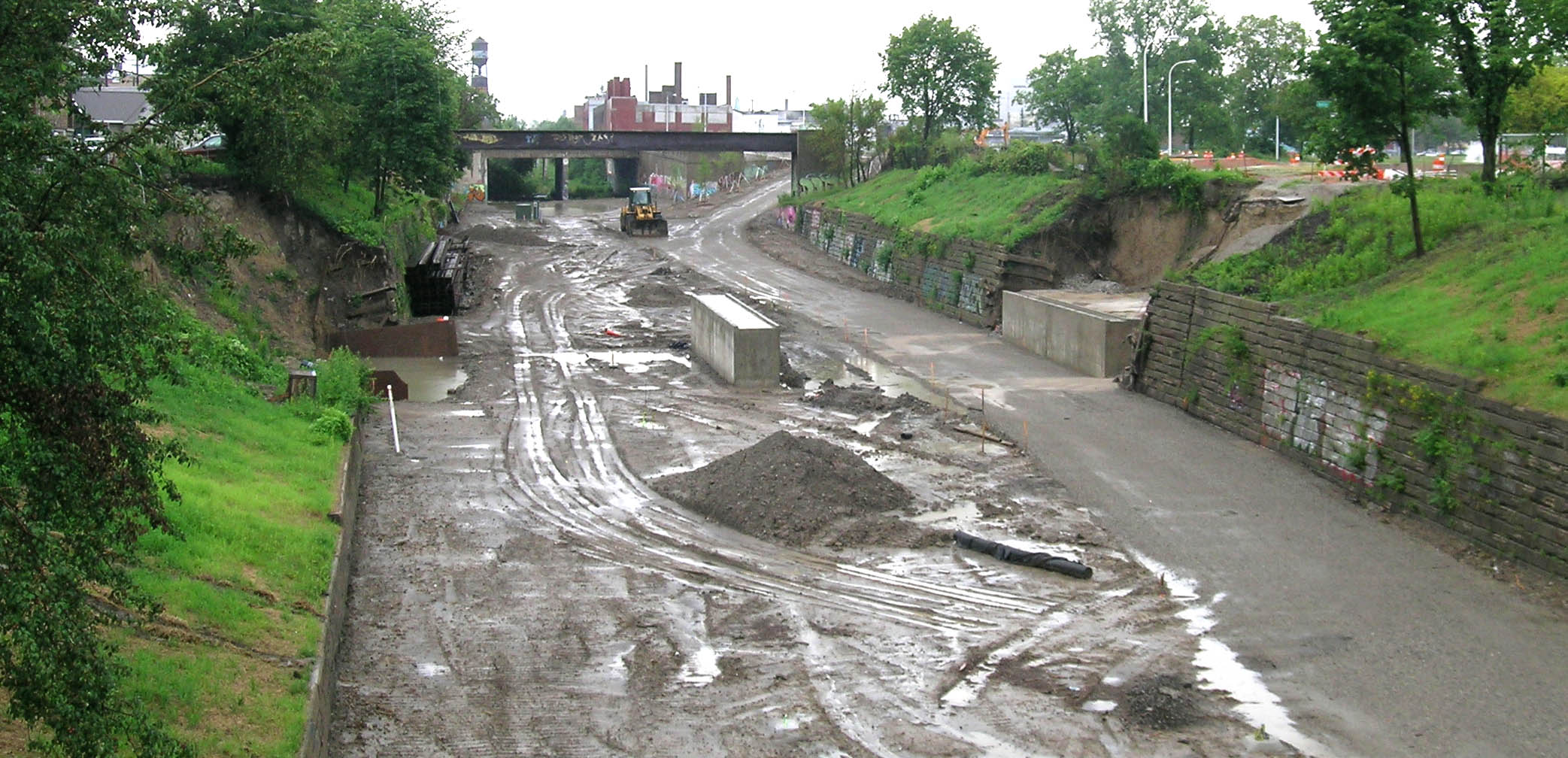
- Site of Antietam Avenue bridge after demolition
- Interactive map
- Location: Detroit, Michigan
- Coordinates: 42°20′43″N 83°2′5″W
- Built: 1930
- Architect: Grand Trunk Western Railroad
- Demolished: c. 2008
- MPS: Highway Highway Bridges of Michigan MPS
- NRHP reference No.: 00000114
- Added to NRHP: February 18, 2000

The Antietam Avenue Bridge was located where Antietam Avenue passed over the Dequindre Cut (formerly owned by the Grand Trunk Western Railroad) in Detroit, Michigan. It has been demolished due to structural deficiencies and will be reconstructed. The original bridge was listed on the National Register of Historic Places in 2000.

== History ==
By the 1920s, there were over 400 industries operating on Detroit's east side. However, the combination of the city's haphazard street plan, the expansion of large factories, and the substantial network of rail tracks conspired to slow traffic within the city, particularly in the east-west direction. In 1923, the city of Detroit and the railroad began a plan to build 22 grade separations; both parties agreed to share the cost.

One of the tracks to be regraded was the line paralleling St. Aubin Street. These tracks ran from the northwest, where they connected with a network of other lines, to the southeast, where the tracks turned to parallel the river and supplied a number of large factories, including the Detroit-Michigan Stove Plant, the United States Rubber Company Plant, and the Parke-Davis Research Laboratory. The tracks terminated at the Brush Street Station in downtown Detroit.

By March 1930, sixteen of the crossings of what now is known as the "Dequindre Cut" were finished, including the nearby Chestnut Street Bridge; the Antietam Avenue Bridge was completed soon thereafter. In 1964, the Antietam Avenue Bridge and the Chestnut Street Bridge were teamed as a one-way pair. In the 1980s, the railway was abandoned, and ownership changed hands.

In 2005, construction started on the conversion of the Dequindre Cut into a rail trail. The first 1.2 miles (1.9 km) were opened to the public in 2009.

== Significance ==
The Dequindre Cut is in good condition, and the course of the Cut and how it relates to the street grid is apparent from the Antietam Avenue bridge. The bridge is good evidence of the grade separation effort early in the twentieth century. However, due to structural deficiencies the bridge was demolished in 2008 and was reconstructed.
