= Dequindre Cut =

Walking path in Detroit, Michigan

Coordinates: 42°20′38″N 83°2′1″W

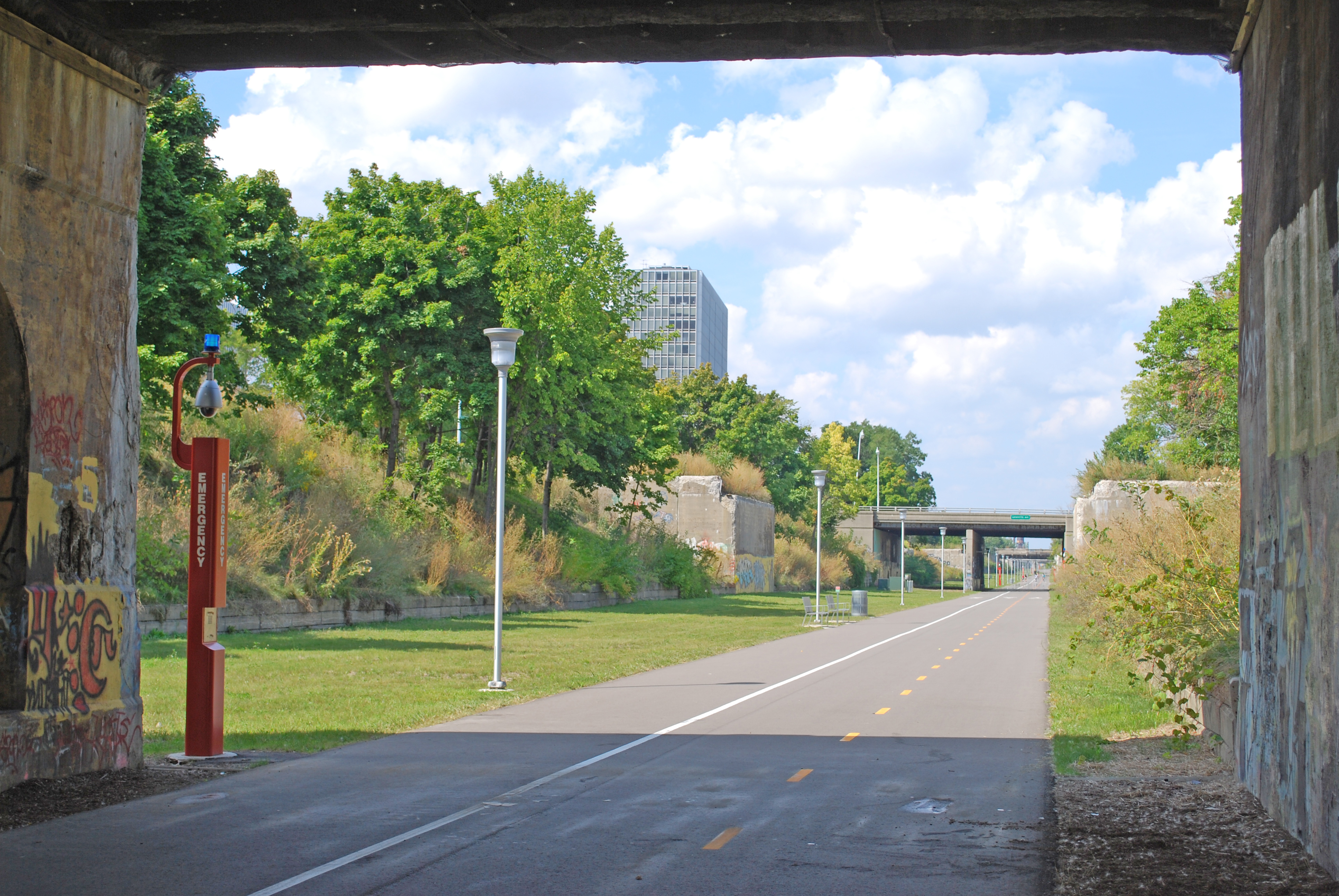
- Dequindre Cut, looking north (2009)
- Length: 2 mi (3.2 km)
- Use: Bicycling, inline skating, walking, cross country skiing
- Difficulty: easy, level, ADA accessible
- Surface: asphalt, crushed stone, concrete

The Dequindre Cut is a below-grade pathway, formerly a Grand Trunk Western Railroad line, located on the east side of Detroit, Michigan, just west of St. Aubin Street. Much of the Cut has been converted to a greenway; the colorful graffiti along the pathway has been left in place.

== Description ==
The railroad line that once ran through the Dequindre Cut runs roughly northwest/southeast at street level through Hamtramck and on to Royal Oak. The Cut begins south of Mack Avenue and runs along the east edge of the Eastern Market. The grade separation gradually increases heading south. It eventually reaches and stays 25 feet beneath grade until it enters the riverfront area south of Jefferson Avenue.

A substantial portion of the Cut has been converted into a greenway. The greenway runs from Mack Avenue south to Woodbridge Street, between Jefferson Avenue and the Detroit River. The Dequindre Trail connects the Cut between Woodbridge Street and the William G. Milliken State Park and Harbor along the International Riverfront.

The greenway currently houses a paved path with separate lanes for both pedestrians and bicycles. Access ramps to the Cut have been constructed at Lafayette Street, Gratiot Avenue, and Wilkins Street. Graffiti on the bridge abutments along the trail were intentionally left in place during the construction of the greenway.

== History ==
The rail line was built in the 1830s by the Detroit and Pontiac Railroad, a predecessor of Canadian National Railway subsidiary Grand Trunk Western Railroad. By the 1920s, there were over 400 industries operating on Detroit's east side. However, the combination of the city's haphazard street plan, the expansion of large factories, and the substantial network of rail tracks conspired to slow traffic within the city, particularly in the east-west direction. In 1923, the city of Detroit and the railroad began a plan to build 22 grade separations; both parties agreed to share the cost.

One of the tracks to be regraded was the line paralleling St. Aubin. These tracks ran from the northwest, where they connected with a network of other lines, to the southeast, where the tracks turned to parallel the river and supplied a number of large factories, including the Detroit-Michigan Stove Plant, the United States Rubber Company Plant, and the Parke-Davis Research Laboratory. The tracks terminated at the Brush Street Station in downtown Detroit.

By March 1930, sixteen of the crossings of the Dequindre Cut were finished, including the Chestnut Street Bridge; the nearby Antietam Avenue Bridge was completed soon thereafter. These two bridges are particularly significant in their illustration of the construction of the time and their relationship to the right-of-way below.

As the century progressed, rail usage declined. Passenger service through the Cut was discontinued in 1982, and freight service continued only a few years beyond that. In 1998-2000, Canadian National sold the 3.5-mile (5.6 km) section of track (including the Cut) south of their main line. During this time of abandonment, the Dequindre Cut was used by graffiti artists, attracted by the concrete bridge abutments and overpasses which protected the art from the weather, as well as the out-of-the-way location. The resulting art included some graffiti masterpieces. These pieces of art have continued since the transformation of the railway, such as a pair of murals created by the Hygienic Dress League Corporation.

In the late 1990s, when casinos were first authorized to be built in Detroit, the Dequindre Cut was considered as a freeway access to their proposed riverfront location. However, the casinos were built elsewhere, leaving the fate of the Dequindre Cut open. In 2003, the GreenWays Initiative granted the Downtown Detroit Partnership $98,750 to put plans in motion to remake the Dequindre Cut as a greenway. The project was later funded by another $3.4 million in grants, and groundbreaking began in 2005. The first stretch of greenway, a 1.2–mile section encompassing most of the Dequindre Cut, opened in 2009.

Construction began in September 2013 to build the remaining greenway half mile section from Mack Avenue to Gratiot. This segment includes a trail entrance into Eastern Market along the northwest side of the Wilkins Street bridge. This extension is part of the Link Detroit project which is funded through various sources including a $10 million TIGER grant. Though the greenway was originally due to be completed in 2014, unexpected underground utilities delayed its opening. The completed extension opened to the public in April 2016.

== Gallery ==
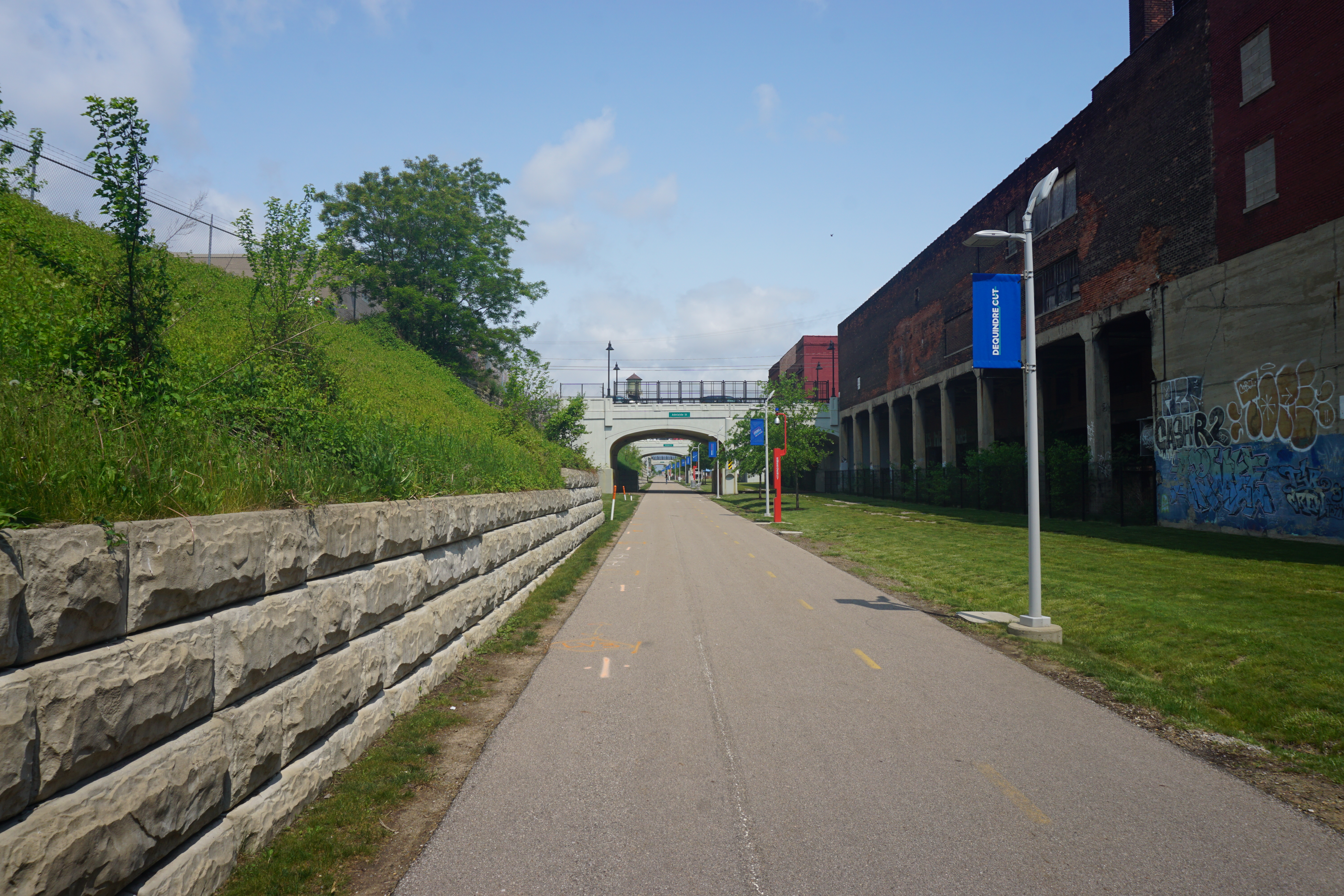
Dequindre Cut, looking north

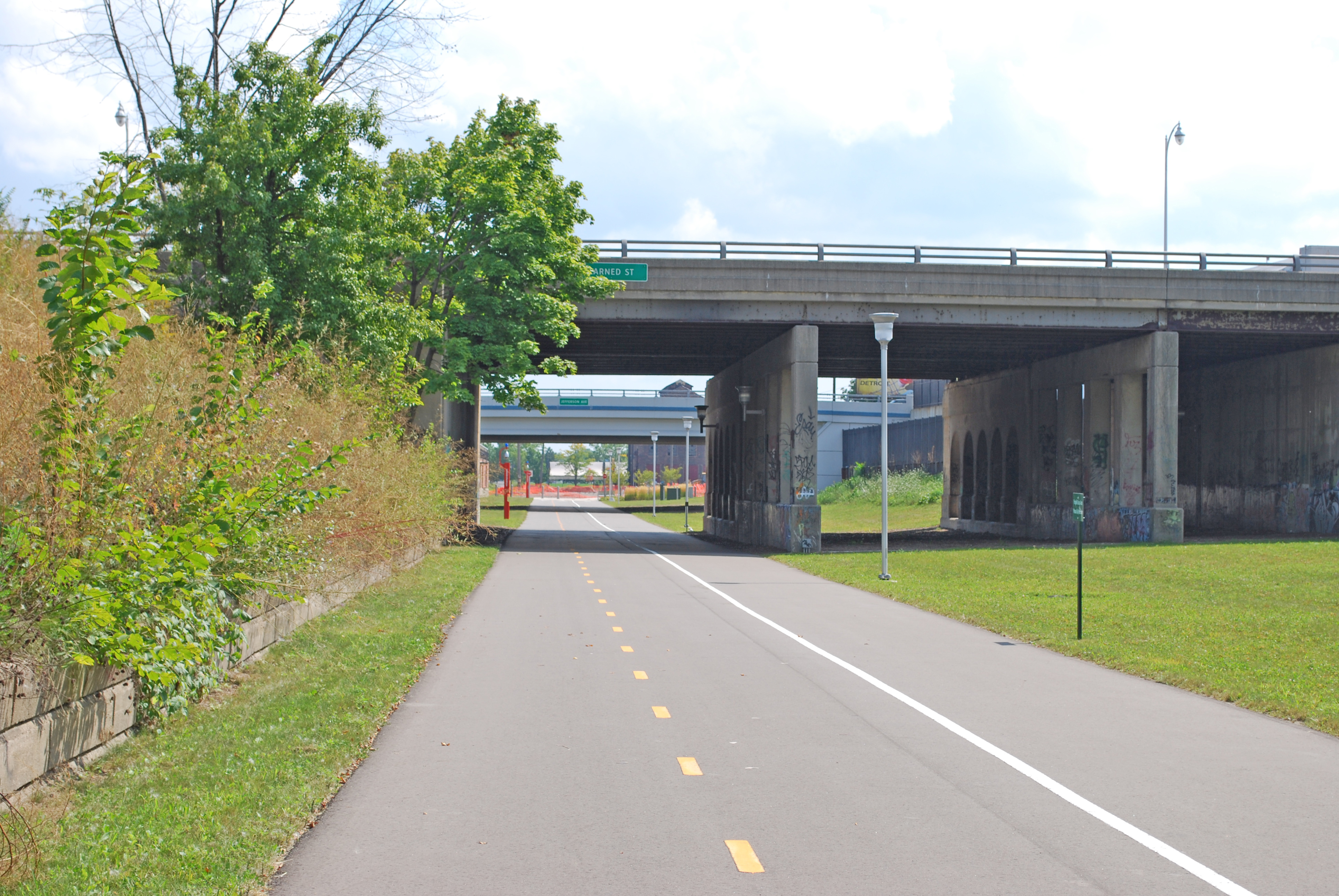
Dequindre Cut, looking south

== See also ==
- Cycling in Detroit
- Antoine Dequindre
