= Chestnut Street Bridge (Detroit) =

Historic bridge in Detroit, Michigan, US

- Chestnut Street Bridge-Grand Trunk Railroad
- U.S. National Register of Historic Places
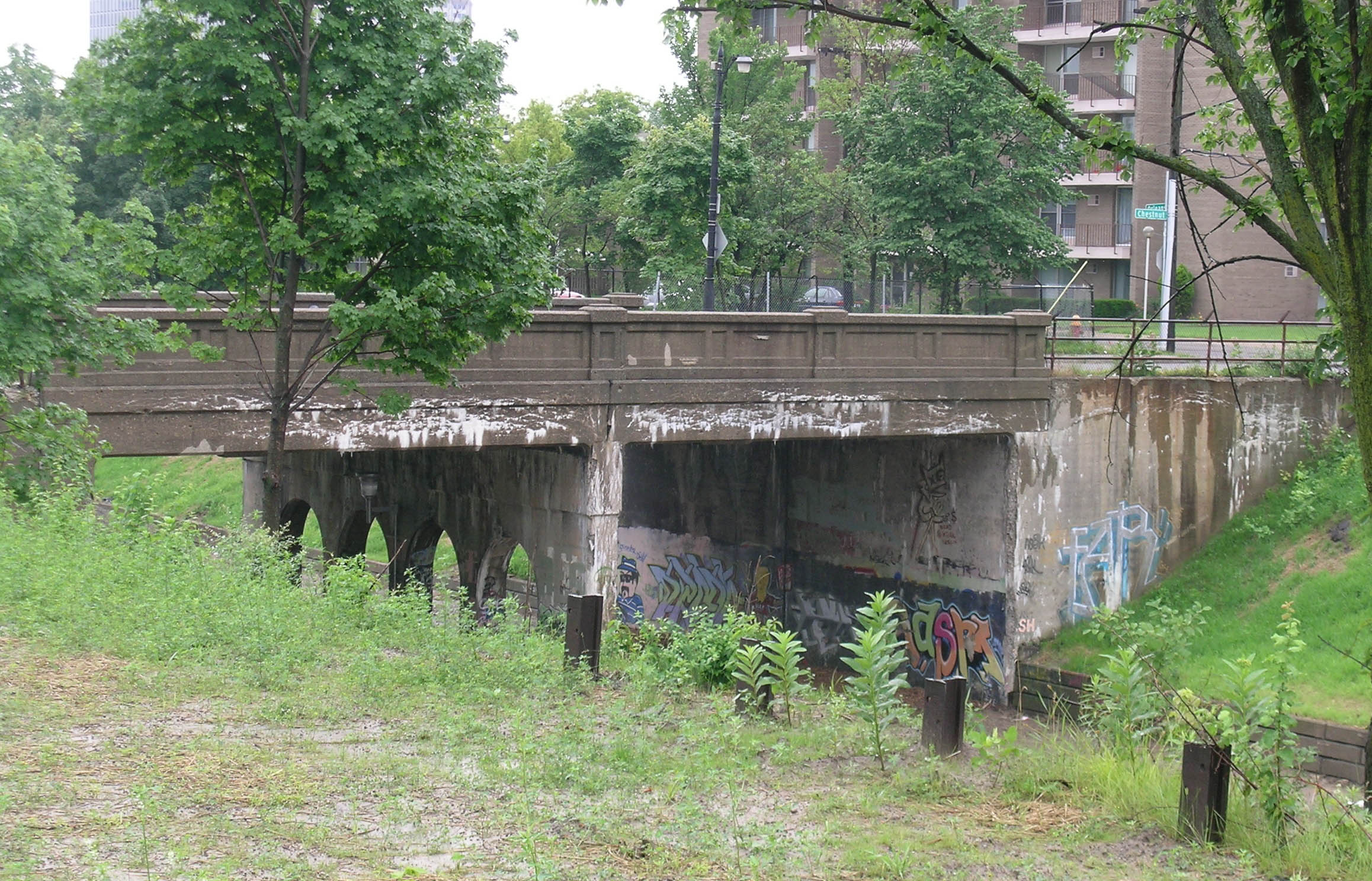
- Chestnut Street bridge from the northeast
- Interactive map
- Location: Detroit, Michigan
- Coordinates: 42°20′41″N 83°2′3″W
- Built: 1929; 97 years ago
- Architect: Grand Trunk Western Railroad
- MPS: Highway Highway Bridges of Michigan MPS
- NRHP reference No.: 00000115
- Added to NRHP: February 18, 2000

The Chestnut Street Bridge is located where Chestnut Street passes over the Dequindre Cut (formerly owned by the Grand Trunk Western Railroad) in Detroit, Michigan. It was listed on the National Register of Historic Places in 2000.

== History ==
By the 1920s, there were over 400 industries operating on Detroit's east side. However, the combination of the city's haphazard street plan, the expansion of large factories, and the substantial network of rail tracks conspired to slow traffic within the city, particularly in the east-west direction. In 1923, the city of Detroit and the railroad began a plan to build 22 grade separations; both parties agreed to share the cost.

One of the tracks to be regraded was the line paralleling St. Aubin Street. These tracks ran from the northwest, where they connected with a network of other lines, to the southeast, where the tracks turned to parallel the river and supplied a number of large factories, including the Detroit-Michigan Stove Plant, the United States Rubber Company Plant, and the Parke-Davis Research Laboratory. The tracks terminated at the Brush Street Station in downtown Detroit.

By March 1930, sixteen of the crossings of what now is known as the "Dequindre Cut" were finished, including the Chestnut Street Bridge; the nearby Antietam Avenue Bridge was completed soon thereafter. In 1964, the Antietam Avenue Bridge and the Chestnut Street Bridge were teamed as a one-way pair. In the 1980s, the railway was abandoned, and ownership changed hands.

In 2005, construction started on the conversion of the Dequindre Cut into a rail trail. The first 1.2 miles (1.9 km), including the portion under the Chestnut Street Bridge, were opened to the public in 2009.

== Description ==
The Chestnut Street Bridge spans the Dequindre Cut, and is constructed of two steel-stringer spans 31 feet in length sitting on concrete abutments and a concrete-post pier. The stringers are encased in concrete and support a 50.3-foot-wide concrete deck covered with asphalt to make a 30 foot wide roadway. The parapets railings are solid concrete with eight recessed panels arranged in pairs between five concrete posts. A wooden pole luminaire is located at each end of the sidewalk.

== Significance ==
The Dequindre Cut is in good condition, and the course of the Cut and how it relates to the street grid is apparent from the Chestnut Street bridge. The bridge is good evidence of the grade separation effort early in the twentieth century.
