= Hygienic Dress League =

American public art duo

The Hygienic Dress League, also known as HDL, is an American art duo founded by Dorota Coy and Steve Coy. Operating as a corporation, the group is known for their public artworks in the Detroit, Michigan area.

== History ==
The duo first met in Hawaii, where they were married. They then moved to Detroit, where the group's first activities involved tagging abandoned buildings with graphics related to the Hygienic Dress League Corporation. In recent years, the group has made a change from these "urban interventions" towards sculptural instillations that they consider to be "surreal augmentations of reality".

Founded in 2007, the group held a public offering of shares in 2014. Using their status as a corporation as their art medium, the group brands themselves with golden gas masks and animals. The pair have stated that the goal of HDL is to critique commercial promotion, by promoting itself.

== Public works ==
- 2013: Barn mural, Soddard road, Port Austin, Michigan.
- 2017: Flight, installation of metallic pigeon sculptures over Detroit's Woodward Esplanade.
- 2018: Diamond II, Limited Edition, Spirit of the Forest, installation at the DTE Energy Conner Creek power plant.
- Profit of Doom, Detroit-based installation and photography series.
- 2019: Future Distortion installation as part of Detroit Art Week.
- 2021: First Contact, NFT release.
- 2022: Employees: 55,554 NFT release.
