= Mad Track Arena =

Indoor velodrome in Detroit, Michigan

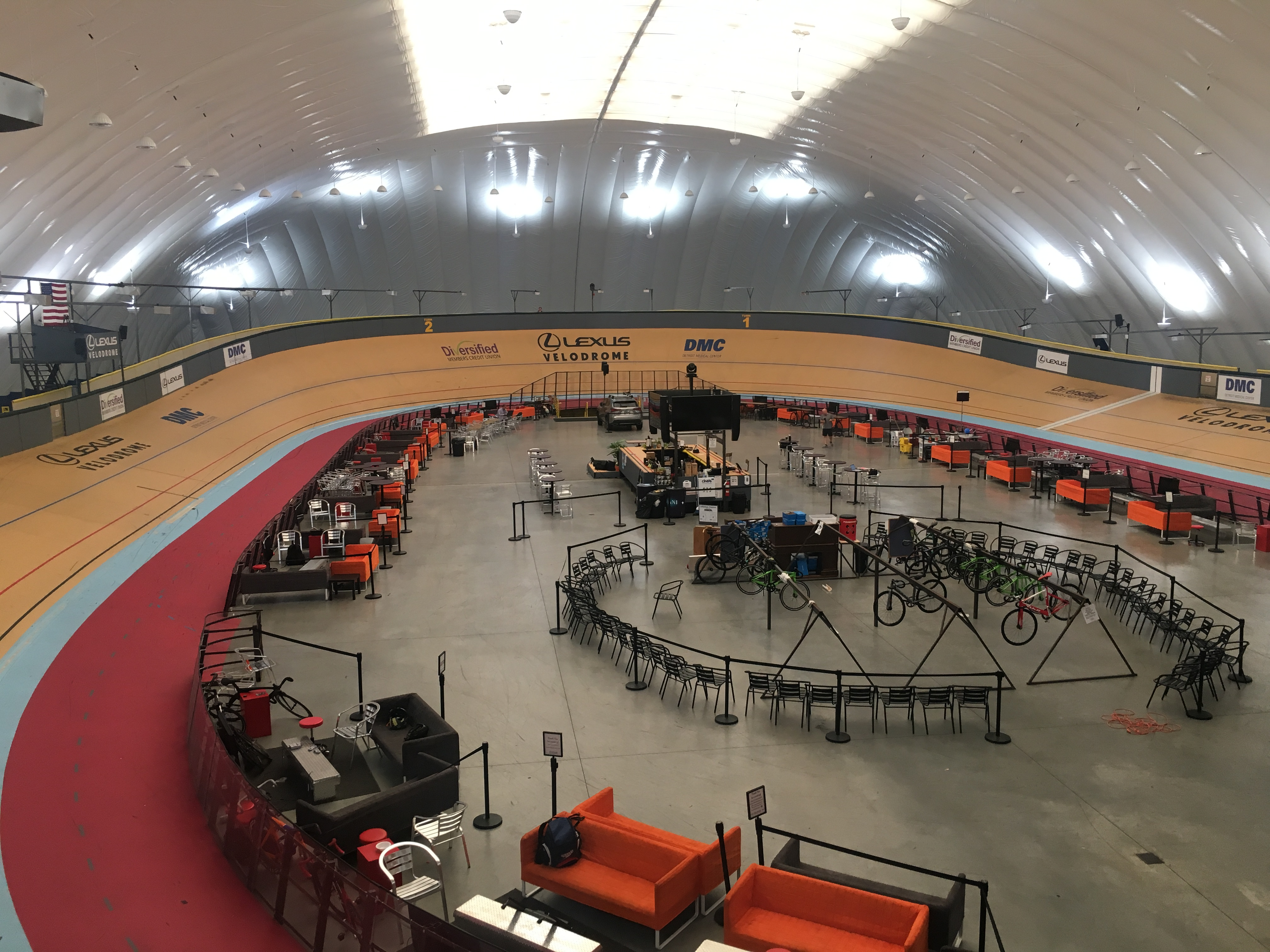
- The interior
- Interactive map of Mad Track Arena
- Former names: Lexus Velodrome
- Location: Detroit, Michigan, U.S.
- Coordinates: 42°21′08.0″N 83°03′01.4″W
- Surface: Wood
- Field size: 166 m (182 yd) track
- Acreage: 1.4 acre

Construction
- Opened: January 2018
- Cost: $4.5 million

Website
- lexusvelodrome.com

The Mad Track Arena is an indoor velodrome located at 601 Mack Avenue in Detroit, Michigan, U.S. It is operated by the Detroit Fitness Foundation, offering indoor roller skating, walking, running and weight lifting in addition to open track cycling, training and racing. Free children’s programs are offered, including free equipment rental. The 166 m (182 yd) track has 50 degree banked turns and 15 degree banked straights. The track opened in January 2018, on the former site of Tolan Playfield (named for Detroit native and double Olympic gold medalist Eddie Tolan). Track cycling competitions are held there regularly, including USA Cycling events. Madison racing is commonly offered. USAC announced that the Madison National Championships will be held at the Lexus Velodrome for 2021 through 2025.

There is a bar located in the center of the track along with ticketed seating as well as general admission viewing. An announcer calls the racing action, which is sometimes broadcast on local PBS station Detroit Public TV.

The velodrome is housed in a 64,000 sq. ft. inflated dome. In December 2021 the dome collapsed and was torn due to a sustained power outage and the failure of the backup generator system that powers the blowers that keep the dome inflated. The dome was repaired and re-inflated, reopening to the public in February 2022.

The ET oval has two sections of track. One red, one green. The innermost red lane measures approximately 214M. While the innermost green lane measures approximately 226.5M. The surface is a smooth polished concrete where the walking, running, skating, and even the learn to ride classes take place.

== See also ==
- List of cycling tracks and velodromes
