= Dorais Velodrome =

Abandoned outdoor velodrome in Detroit, Michigan, U.S.

Coordinates: 42°26′32.6″N 83°02′44.4″W

- Interactive map of Dorais Velodrome
- Location: Detroit, Michigan, United States
- Owner: City of Detroit
- Surface: Concrete
- Field size: 325 m (355 yd) track

Construction
- Built: 1969
- Opened: 1969

The Dorais Velodrome is an abandoned outdoor velodrome in Dorais Park in Detroit, Michigan, USA. It was built in 1969 for $50,000 with mostly volunteer labor by the Michigan Bicycling Federation. The site was donated by the City of Detroit. The track is a one-fifth-mile 45 degree banked concrete track. It officially opened in late July 1969 prior to the National Bicycle Racing Championships.

Numerous races and bicycle training classes were held on the track between 1969 and 1989. These were typically organized by the Wolverine Sports Club and the Detroit Recreation Department.

The track deteriorated over time making it no longer suitable for track racing. In 1993, the City of Detroit held a public hearing for a replacement track. In 1997, the cost to rebuild the track was estimated at $700,000 according to John Jones of the Detroit Recreation Department. By then, plans were underway to build an outdoor velodrome at Bloomer Park in Rochester Hills, Michigan.

== See also ==
- List of cycling tracks and velodromes
