= 1999 CPSL League Cup =

1999 League Cup
Tournament details
- Country: Canada
- Teams: 8

Final positions
- Champions: Toronto Olympians (2nd title)
- Runners-up: Toronto Croatia

Tournament statistics
- Matches played: 29
- Goals scored: 111 (3.83 per match)

The 1999 CPSL League Cup was the 2nd edition of the Canadian Professional Soccer League's league cup tournament running from July through late September. Toronto Olympians successfully defended their league cup title after defeating Toronto Croatia 3–0 at Centennial Park Stadium in Toronto, Ontario, which resulted in the establishment of their league cup dynasty.

== Format ==
The format used in the competition was the traditional group stage with the two top clubs advancing to the semi-finals.

== Group stage ==
=== Group A ===
Team	Pld	W	D	L	GF	GA	GD	Pts	Status
Toronto Olympians	6	6	0	0	30	7	+23	18	Advanced to the semi-final
Oshawa Flames	6	3	1	2	11	12	−1	10	
York Region Shooters	6	1	2	3	14	17	−3	5	
North York Astros	6	0	1	5	9	28	−19	1	

7 July 1999
20:30

York Region Shooters	1–1	North York Astros
John Bottineau 63'	Report	Alex Nardi 73'

Richmond Green, Richmond Hill, Ontario
11 July 1999
19:30

Toronto Olympians	4–1	North York Astros
Gus Kouzmanis 10', 24'; Berdusco 72'; John Matas 75'	Report	Chris Ewers

Birchmount Stadium, Toronto, Ontario

18 July 1999
19:30

North York Astros	2–10	York Region Shooters
Courtney Dennis 31'; Adam Lee 71'	Report	Giummarra 11', 32'; John Bottineau 15', 23', 74'; Mich D'Angelo 35', 48'; Adrian Sciarra 54', 60'; Damian Puranda 86'

Esther Shiner Stadium, Toronto, Ontario
Attendance: 100
Referee: Bill Teeuwen (OSA)
18 July 1999
19:30

Toronto Olympians	2–0	Oshawa Flames
Ron Belfon 27'; Thomas 34'	Report

Birchmount Stadium, Toronto, Ontario

21 July 1999
20:30

Oshawa Flames	3–0	North York Astros
	Report

Oshawa Civic Stadium, Oshawa, Ontario
22 July 1999
20:30

York Region Shooters	1–6	Toronto Olympians
Adrian Sciarra 45'	Report	Berdusco 12', 29'; Gus Kouzmanis 20', 36', 66'; Smith 37'

Richmond Green, Richmond Hill, Ontario
Attendance: 80
Referee: Glenn Sharkey (OSA)

25 July 1999
19:30

York Region Shooters	1–1	Oshawa Flames
	Report

Richmond Green, Richmond Hill, Ontario
28 July 1999
20:30

North York Astros	2–3	Oshawa Flames
Sean O'Connell 58', 66'	Report	Terrance Lazarus 30', 59'; Gomez 80'

Esther Shiner Stadium, Toronto, Ontario
Attendance: 125
Referee: Andrew Jasinski (OSA)

28 July 1999
20:00

Toronto Olympians	4–1	York Region Shooters
John Matas, Thomas,	Report	Suhail Mirza

Birchmount Stadium, Toronto, Ontario
1 August 1999
19:00

Oshawa Flames	1–7	Toronto Olympians
	Report

Oshawa Civic Stadium, Oshawa, Ontario

4 August 1999
20:30

North York Astros	3–7	Toronto Olympians
Seamus O'Connell 49'; Osman Jiminez 53'; Courtney Dennis 84'	Report	Gus Kouzmanis 20'; Tony Marshall 25'; Berdusco 28'; Ron Belfon 63'; Danny Sanna 69'; Thomas 74', 79'

Esther Shiner Stadium, Toronto, Ontario
Attendance: 79
Referee: Lyon Tipovski (OSA)
4 August 1999
20:30

Oshawa Flames	3–0	York Region Shooters
John Lawrence; Jay Bricknell; Pat Dickerson	Report

Oshawa Civic Stadium, Oshawa, Ontario

=== Group B ===
Team	Pld	W	D	L	GF	GA	GD	Pts	Status
Toronto Croatia	6	4	1	1	8	3	+5	13	Advanced to the semi-final
St. Catharines Roma Wolves	6	4	0	2	11	9	+2	12	
London City SC	6	1	3	2	7	8	−1	6	
Glen Shields Sun Devils	6	0	2	4	8	14	−6	2	

7 July 1999
19:30

St. Catharines Roma Wolves	3–1	Glen Shields Sun Devils
Tony Carbonara 26'; Patrick Kelman 62'; Cipriani 77'	Report [ Report]	Eric Ranaldo 68'

Club Roma Stadium, St. Catharines, Ontario
Attendance: 500
7 July 1999
20:30

Toronto Croatia	1–1	London City SC
Ivica Sola 65'	Report	Gebczynski 62'

Centennial Park Stadium, Toronto, Ontario
Attendance: 200
Referee: Gordon Arrowsmith (OSA)

14 July 1999
20:15

St. Catharines Roma Wolves	1–0	Toronto Croatia
Gary McGuchan 9'	Report [ Report]

Club Roma Stadium, St. Catharines, Ontario
Attendance: 1000
18 July 1999
19:00

Glen Shields Sun Devils	0–2	Toronto Croatia
	Report	Andy Madeiros; Robert Mandekic 37'

Dufferin District Field, Vaughan, Ontario

23 July 1999
20:30

London City SC	3–2	St. Catharines Roma Wolves
Patrick Burney 16'; Justin Lawrence 18'; Ludio Bertand 70'	Report [ Report]	Ianiero 28'; Patrick Kelman 60'

Cove Road Stadium, London, Ontario
25 July 1999
19:00

Glen Shields Sun Devils	2–2	London City SC
	Report

Dufferin District Field, Vaughan, Ontario

28 July 1999
20:30

St. Catharines Roma Wolves	1–0	London City SC
Patrick Kelman 35'	Report [ Report]

Club Roma Stadium, St. Catharines, Ontario
Attendance: 400
28 July 1999
20:30

Toronto Croatia	2–1	London City SC
	Report

Centennial Park Stadium, Toronto, Ontario

30 July 1999
20:30

London City SC	0–1	Toronto Croatia
	Report

Cove Road Stadium, London, Ontario
1 August 1999
19:00

Glen Shields Sun Devils	3–4	St. Catharines Roma Wolves
Mike Glasgow; Marco Bonofiglio; David McDonald	Report [ Report]	Cipriani; Gus Marcho; Frank Del Priore,

Dufferin District Field, Vaughan, Ontario

4 August 1999
20:30

Toronto Croatia	2–0	St. Catharines Roma Wolves
Andy Madeiros 75'; Anton Musa 89'	Report [ Report]

Centennial Park Stadium, Toronto, Ontario
6 August 1999
20:30

London City SC	2–2	Glen Shields Sun Devils
Mesanovic,	Report	Jeff Brown; Benning

Cove Road Stadium, London, Ontario

== Semi-finals ==
25 August 1999
20:15

St. Catharines Roma Wolves	0–2	Toronto Olympians
	Report [ Report]	Kouzmanis 4'; Berdusco 65'

Club Roma Stadium, St. Catharines, Ontario
Referee: Glen Starkey
3 September 1999
20:30

Toronto Olympians	4–2	St. Catharines Roma Wolves
Handsor 58'; Berdusco 76'; Arte Alkatov 78'; Ron Belfon 89'	Report [ Report]	Campbell 63'; Frank Delpriore 71'

Birchmount Stadium, Toronto, Ontario
Attendance: 100
Referee: Tony Camacho (OSA)

Toronto won 6–2 on aggregate.

25 August 1999
20:30

Oshawa Flames	0–0	Toronto Croatia
	Report

Oshawa Civic Stadium, Oshawa, Ontario
Attendance: 300
Referee: Neil Schofield (OSA)
1 September 1999
19:00

Toronto Croatia	2–0	Oshawa Flames
Tom Granic 23'; Andy Madeiros 59'	Report

Centennial Park Stadium, Toronto, Ontario

Toronto won 2–0 on aggregate.

== Final ==
September 26
15:00 ET

Toronto Croatia	0–3	Toronto Olympians
	Report	Handsor 40'; Thomas 62', 66'

Centennial Park Stadium, Toronto, Ontario
Attendance: 857
Referee: Silviu Petrescu (Ontario)

GK	1	(Canada) George Azcurra
RB	2	(Canada) Daniel Pilas
CB	4	(Canada) Domagoj Sain
CB	3	(Canada) Ivica Sola
LB	20	(Canada) Anton Granic
RM	7	(Canada) Robert Fran	(substituted off) 67'
CM	16	(Canada) Anton Musa
CM	8	(Poland) Czeslaw Zajac	(substituted off) 58'
LM	10	(Canada) Tomislav Granic	(c)
ST	9	(Canada) Andy Madeiros	(substituted off) 74'
ST	17	(Canada) Denny Draganic
Substitutes:
	18	(Canada) Ivica Jelic	(substituted on) 67'
	21	(Canada) Nikola Marketic
	22	(Canada) Robert Madekic	(substituted on) 74'
	5	(Canada) Frane Sain
	23	(Canada) Alen Majstorovic
	10	(Canada) Franjo Ljubanovic
	19	(Canada) Josip Draganic	(substituted on) 58'
Manager:
(Croatia) Bruno Pilas

GK	1	(Canada) Brian Bowes
RB	8	(Canada) Bayete Smith
CB	6	(Canada) Peyvand Mossavat
CB	4	(Canada) Ian Cardey	(substituted off) 81'
LB	5	(Canada) Tony Marshall	(substituted off) 76'
RM	20	(Canada) Danny Ziannis	(c)
CM	9	(Canada) Elvis Thomas
CM	17	(Canada) Chris Handsor
LM	7	(New Zealand) Daryl Holmes
ST	3	(Canada) Phil Caporella	(substituted off) 63'
ST	23	(Canada) Eddy Berdusco	(substituted off) 76'
Substitutes:
GK	22	(Canada) Tom Bianci
DF	12	(Canada) Louie Ouroutzaglou	(substituted on) 81'
DF	15	(Canada) Louie Katsavrias
MF	16	(Canada) Ron Belfon
MF	13	(Canada) Danny Sanna	(substituted on) 76'
FW	10	(Canada) John Matas	(substituted on) 76'
FW	11	(Canada) Gus Kouzmanis	(substituted on) 63'
Manager:
(England) David Gee

Assistant referees:
Zoran Krisco
Neil Scofield
Fourth official:
Norma Clarke
