= 1998 CPSL League Cup =

1998 League Cup
Tournament details
- Country: Canada
- Teams: 8

Final positions
- Champions: Toronto Olympians (1st title)
- Runners-up: St. Catharines Roma Wolves

Tournament statistics
- Matches played: 30
- Goals scored: 127 (4.23 per match)

The 1998 CPSL League Cup was the inaugural edition of the Canadian Professional Soccer League's league cup tournament running from July through late September. The tournament final was played in a two-game series final at Club Roma Stadium in St. Catharines, Ontario, and at Birchmount Stadium in Toronto, Ontario. The tournament was won by the Toronto Olympians after defeating St. Catharines Roma Wolves 3-0 on goals on aggregate.

== Overview ==
After proposals made in 1996 by the USL A-League to create an open cup competition within Canada failed to materialize the newly formed Canadian Professional Soccer League launched the CPSL League Cup in 1998 as the successor league cup to the Canadian National Soccer League's. Though initially the tournament was restricted to CPSL member clubs plans were formulated for future participation of USL A-League Canadian franchises and the champions of the various top provincial leagues. Eventually the league's objective would be reached in the 2003 Open Canada Cup as the tournament officially became open to all Canadian professional and amateur clubs in order to provide a potential candidate for the CONCACAF Champions' Cup. The original format of the tournament was organized into a group stage with the two top teams advancing to the semifinals.

== Group stage ==
=== Group A ===
Team	Pld	W	D	L	GF	GA	GD	Pts	Status
Glen Shields	6	5	1	0	19	3	+16	16	Advanced to the semi-final
North York Astros	6	3	1	2	7	6	+1	10	
Toronto Croatia	6	3	0	3	16	14	+2	9	
London City SC	6	0	0	6	5	24	−19	0	

3 June 1998
20:00

Toronto Croatia	1–3	Glen Shields
Stephen Warren 89'	Report	Bodo Lazetic 7'; Danny Sankar 50'; Michele D'Angelo 60'

Centennial Park Stadium, Toronto, Ontario
Attendance: 150
Referee: Gord Arrowsmith (OSA)
1 June 1998
20:00

Toronto Croatia	5–1	London City SC
Brandon Trtani 5'; Zajac 23', 91'; Norman Woodrow 83'; Robert Hildenbrand 84' (o.g.)	Report	Junior Emanuel 78'

Centennial Park Stadium, Toronto, Ontario
Attendance: 100
Referee: Steve DiPietro (OSA)

14 June 1998
19:00

Glen Shields	6–0	London City SC
	Report

Dufferin District Field, Vaughan, Ontario
14 June 1998
19:30

North York Astros	0–2	Toronto Croatia
	Report	Norman Woodrow 17'; Zajac 26'

Esther Shiner Stadium, Toronto, Ontario
Attendance: 80
Referee: Manuel Orellano (OSA)

21 June 1998
19:00

Glen Shields	4–1	Toronto Croatia
	Report

Dufferin District Field, Vaughan, Ontario
21 June 1998
19:30

North York Astros	2–0	London City SC
Kerwin Skeete 8'; Boris Lopez 90'	Report

Esther Shiner Stadium, Toronto, Ontario
Attendance: 100
Referee: David Smith (OSA)

24 June 1998
20:00

Toronto Croatia	1–2	North York Astros
Zajac 80'	Report	Ednie Tavares 1'; Kerwin Skeete 5'

Centennial Park Stadium, Toronto, Ontario
Referee: Frank Marcelo (OSA)
26 June 1998
20:30

London City SC	4–6	Toronto Croatia
	Report

Cove Road Stadium, London, Ontario

1 July 1998
19:00

Glen Shields	1–1	North York Astros
Dave McDonald 7'	Report	Alejandro Martinez 45'

Dufferin District Field, Vaughan, Ontario
Attendance: 300
Referee: Gordon Arrowsmith (OSA)
10 July 1998
20:30

London City SC	0–3	Glen Shields
	Report

Cove Road Stadium, London, Ontario

24 July 1998
20:30

London City SC	0–2	North York Astros
	Report

Cove Road Stadium, London, Ontario
9 August 1998
19:30

North York Astros	0–2	Glen Shields
	Report	Donia 49'; Benning 64'

Esther Shiner Stadium, Toronto, Ontario
Attendance: 80
Referee: Gordon Arrowsmith (OSA)

=== Group B ===
Team	Pld	W	D	L	GF	GA	GD	Pts	Status
Toronto Olympians	6	5	1	0	21	7	+14	16	Advanced to the semi-final
St. Catharines Roma Wolves	6	3	2	1	20	10	+10	11	
York Region Shooters	6	1	1	4	9	20	−11	4	
Mississauga Eagles P.S.C.	6	1	0	5	10	23	−13	3	

7 June 1998
19:00

York Region Shooters	1–3	Toronto Olympians
	Report

Highland Park, Aurora, Ontario
14 June 1998
17:00

Mississauga Eagles P.S.C.	5–2	York Region Shooters
	Report

Wildwood Park, Mississauga, Ontario

21 June 1998
19:00

York Region Shooters	2–1	Mississauga Eagles P.S.C.
	Report

Highland Park, Aurora, Ontario
21 June 1998
17:30

Toronto Olympians	3–1	St. Catharines Roma Wolves
Kouzmanis 55', 82'; Danny Ziannis	[ Report]	Cipriani

Birchmount Stadium, Toronto, Ontario

24 June 1998
20:15

St. Catharines Roma Wolves	2–2	York Region Shooters
Gary McGuchan 17'; Borgh 44'	[ Report]	Angelo Covello 23'; Simon Roeleveld 63'

Club Roma Stadium, St. Catharines, Ontario
28 June 1998
17:00

York Region Shooters	1–4	St. Catharines Roma Wolves
Adrian Sciarra	[ Report]	Patrick Dugas, Gary McGuchan,

Highland Park, Aurora, Ontario

22 July 1998
20:30

Mississauga Eagles P.S.C.	1–4	Toronto Olympians
Ramin Kieifar 49'	Report	Berdusco 14'; Gus Kouzmanis 20', 31'; Lei 27'

Wildwood Park, Mississauga, Ontario
Attendance: 60
Referee: Tony Camacho (OSA)
29 July 1998
20:15

St. Catharines Roma Wolves	2–2	Toronto Olympians
	Report

Club Roma Stadium, St. Catharines, Ontario

31 July 1998

Toronto Olympians	4–1	Mississauga Eagles P.S.C.
	Report

Birchmount Stadium, Toronto, Ontario
5 August 1998
19:30

Toronto Olympians	5–1	York Region Shooters
	Report

Birchmount Stadium, Toronto, Ontario

5 August 1998
20:15

St. Catharines Roma Wolves	5–1	Mississauga Eagles P.S.C.
Gary McGuchan 2', 48'; Anwar Ahmed 70'; Ianiero; Patrick Dugas	[ Report]	Mike Fedoruk 88'

Club Roma Stadium, St. Catharines, Ontario
9 August 1998
17:00

Mississauga Eagles P.S.C.	1–6	St. Catharines Roma Wolves
Herman Duque	[ Report]	Anwar Ahmed; Arghittu, Pat Dugas; Gary McGuchan; John Sozio

Wildwood Park, Mississauga, Ontario

== Knockout stage ==
=== Bracket ===
Semi-finals
A2	St. Catharines Roma Wolves	5	1	6
B1	Glen Shields	1	0	1
B2	North York Astros	0	1	1
A1	Toronto Olympians	5	1	9

Finals
St. Catharines Roma Wolves	0	0	0
Toronto Olympians	0	3	3

=== Semi-finals ===
12 August 1998
20:15

St. Catharines Roma Wolves	5–1	Glen Shields
Patrick Dugas 4'; Tony Carbonara 38'; Ianiero 59'; Anwar Ahmed 79'; Gary McGuchan 88'	[ Report]	Angelo Donio 89'

Club Roma Stadium, St. Catharines, Ontario
Referee: Steve DePiero
26 August 1998
20:00

Glen Shields	0–1	St. Catharines Roma Wolves
	[ Report]	Keith Moore 40'

Highland Park, Aurora, Ontario

St. Catharines won 6–1 on aggregate.

14 August 1999
20:15

Toronto Olympians	4–0	North York Astros
Berdusco 20', 78'; Gus Kouzmanis 58'; Ron Belfon 93'	Report

Birchmount Stadium, Toronto, Ontario
Attendance: 250
Referee: Manuel Orellana (OSA)
26 August 1999
20:00

North York Astros	1–5	Toronto Olympians
	Report

Esther Shiner Stadium, Toronto, Ontario

Toronto won 9–1 on aggregate.

=== Finals ===
16 September 1998
20:15

St. Catharines Roma Wolves	0–0	Toronto Olympians
	Report [ Report]

Club Roma Stadium, St. Catharines, Ontario
Attendance: 200
Referee: Gord Arrowsmith (OSA)
25 September 1998
20:00 ET

Toronto Olympians	3–0	St. Catharines Roma Wolves
Kouzmanis 44', 66'; Berdusco 63'	Report [ Report]

Birchmount Stadium, Toronto, Ontario
Attendance: 300
Referee: Frank Marciello (OSA)

GK	1	(Canada) Brian Bowes
RB	20	(Canada) Danny Ziannis
CB	4	(Canada) Ian Cardey
LB	5	(Canada) Tony Marshall
CM	16	(New Zealand) Daryl Holmes	(substituted off) 82'
RM	17	(Canada) John Matas
CM	6	(Canada) Peyvand Mossavat
CM	7	(China) Gong Lei	(substituted off) 72'
LM	10	(Canada) Chris Handsor	(substituted off) 82'
ST	23	(Canada) Eddy Berdusco
ST	11	(Canada) Gus Kouzmanis
Substitutes:
DF	15	(Canada) Louie Katsavrias	(substituted on) 82'
DF	12	(Canada) Louie Ouroutzaglou	(substituted on) 82'
MF	8	(Canada) Bayete Smith	(substituted on) 72'
MF	2	(Canada) Ian Carter
Manager:
(England) David Gee

GK	1	(Canada) Dino Perri	(yellow card) 45' (red card)
RB	3	(Canada) Joe Carbonara	(substituted off) 69'
CB	7	(Canada) John McNeil
CB	6	(Canada) Keith Moore
LB	4	(Canada) Albert Reinhart	(substituted off) 45'
RM	8	(Canada) Pat Dugas
CM	13	(Canada) Lucio Ianiero
CM	22	(Canada) Gary McGuchan
LM	10	(Canada) Tony Carbonara
ST	18	(Canada) Carlo Arghittu
ST	14	(Canada) Anwar Ahmao	(substituted off) 32'
Substitutes:
GK	21	(Canada) Brian MacDonald	(substituted on) 45'
MF	17	(Canada) Marco Antonio Marino	(substituted on) 69'
FW	15	(Canada) Luciano Berarocco
FW	9	(Canada) Jerry Cipriani	(substituted on) 32'
Manager:
(Canada) Dino Perri

Assistant referees:
Silviu Petrescu
Amato DeLuca
Fourth official:
Manuel Orellana

Toronto won 3–0 on aggregate.
