= 2000 Canadian Professional Soccer League season =

Canadian Professional Soccer League
- Season: 2000
- Champions: Toronto Croatia
- Regular Season title: Toronto Olympians
- Matches: 56
- Goals: 186 (3.32 per match)
- Top goalscorer: Gus Kouzmanis (Toronto Olympians)
- Best goalkeeper: Piotr Libicz
- Biggest home win: Toronto Olympians 8-0 London City (September 27, 2000)
- Biggest away win: London City 1-6 Toronto Olympians (June 2, 2000); York Region Shooters 1-6 Toronto Croatia (August 27, 2000)
- Highest scoring: Toronto Olympians 8-0 London City (September 27, 2000)

The 2000 Canadian Professional Soccer League season was the third season under the Canadian Professional Soccer League name. The season began on May 26, 2000 and concluded on October 1, 2000 with Toronto Croatia defeating Toronto Olympians 2-1 to claim their first CPSL Championship (known as the Primus CPSL Cup for sponsorship reasons). The final was hosted at Cove Road Stadium for the first time. Throughout the season, all eight clubs from the previous year returned, while the Olympians secured their third straight regular season title. The league received sponsorship from Primus Canada, which granted Primus naming rights to the CPSL Championship, and Vincent Ursini was appointed the CPSL Chairman.

== Teams ==
Team	City	Stadium	Manager
Glen Shields Sun Devils	Vaughan, Ontario (Thornhill)	Dufferin District Field	Dave Benning
London City	London, Ontario (Westmount)	Cove Road Stadium	Jurek Gebczynski
North York Astros	Toronto, Ontario (North York)	Esther Shiner Stadium	Rafael Carbajal
Oshawa Flames	Oshawa, Ontario (Vanier)	Oshawa Civic Stadium	Stan Bombino
St. Catharines Wolves	St. Catharines, Ontario (Vansickle)	Club Roma Stadium	Lucio Ianiero
Toronto Croatia	Toronto, Ontario (Etobicoke)	Centennial Park Stadium	Velimir Crljen
Toronto Olympians	Toronto, Ontario (Scarborough)	Birchmount Stadium	David Gee
York Region Shooters	Richmond Hill, Ontario	Richmond Green	Bijan Azizi

Location of CPSL teams outside of Toronto for the 2000 CPSL season.

Location of CPSL teams in Toronto for the 2000 CPSL season.

== Final standings ==
Pos	Team	Pld	W	D	L	GF	GA	GD	Pts	Qualification
1	Toronto Olympians	14	12	1	1	45	9	+36	37	Qualification for Playoffs
2	St. Catharines Roma	14	12	1	1	31	19	+12	37	Qualification for Playoffs
3	Toronto Croatia	14	9	1	4	36	17	+19	28	Qualification for Playoffs
4	Glen Shields Sun Devils	14	5	3	6	26	30	−4	18	Qualification for Playoffs
5	York Region Shooters	14	4	2	8	17	30	−13	14	
6	North York Astros	14	3	2	9	17	29	−12	11	
7	Oshawa Flames	14	2	3	9	22	35	−13	9	
8	London City	14	2	1	11	12	45	−33	7	

Updated to match(es) played on September 28, 2000. Source: http://www.rocketrobinsoccerintoronto.com/00cp0059.htm
Rules for classification: 1) points; 2) goal difference; 3) number of goals scored.

== Primus Canada CPSL Championship playoffs ==
The top four teams qualified for a one-game semifinal that led to the championship game played on October 1 at Cove Road Stadium in London, Ontario.

Semifinals
1	Toronto Olympians	1
4	Glen Shields Sun Devils	0
2	St. Catharines Roma	1
3	Toronto Croatia	3

Final
1	Toronto Olympians	1
2	Toronto Croatia	2

=== Wildcard ===
September 29, 2000	London City	1–1 (a.e.t.) (3–4 p)	Glen Shields Sun Devils	London, Ontario
8:30 ET	Michael Kubicki 58'	(Report)	Mike Glasgow 15'	Stadium: Cove Road Stadium; Attendance: 400
	Penalties
	Chris Picanco (penalty scored); Luan Jonuzi (penalty scored); Gebczynski (penalty missed); Michael Kubicki (penalty scored); Jeff Brown (penalty missed)		Courtney Denis (penalty scored); Craig Williams (penalty scored); Sullivan (penalty scored); Chris Steffanazzi (penalty scored)

=== Semifinals ===
September 30, 2000	Toronto Croatia	3–1	St. Catharines Roma	London, Ontario
5:00 ET	Tomislav Granic 13'; Leo Marasovic 47'; Denny Draganic 81'	(Report)	Gary McGutchan 61'	Stadium: Cove Road Stadium; Attendance: 100

September 30, 2000	Toronto Olympians	1–0	Glen Shields Sun Devils	London, Ontario
7:00 ET	Titus 31'	(Report)		Stadium: Cove Road Stadium; Attendance: 100

=== Primus CPSL Championship ===
October 1
3:15 ET

Toronto Olympians	1–2	Toronto Croatia
Kouzmanis 92'	Report	Josip Draganic 68'; Denny Draganic 80'

Cove Road Stadium, London, Ontario
Attendance: 250
Referee: Manuel Orellano (Ontario)

GK	1	(Canada) Brian Bowes
RB	8	(Canada) Bayete Smith
CB	6	(Canada) Peyvand Mossavat	(substituted off) 74'
CB	13	Danny Sanna	(substituted off) 82'
LB	5	Tony Marshall (c)
RM	16	Ron Belfon	(substituted off) 69'
CM	9	(Canada) Elvis Thomas	(substituted off) 45'
CM	23	(Canada) Eddy Berdusco
LM	2	(Trinidad and Tobago) Rick Titus
ST	17	(England) Darren Tilley
ST	11	(Canada) Gus Kouzmanis
Substitutes:
GK	22	Lee Burrows
DF	4	(Canada) Stevie Gill	(substituted on) 82'
DF	7	John McNeil	(substituted on) 45'
FW	10	John Matas	(substituted on) 69'
MF	15	Louie Katsavrias
FW	18	(Canada) Phil Capporella	(substituted on) 74'
Manager:
(England) David Gee

GK	1	(Canada) George Azcurra
RB	22	Robert Fran
CB	19	Josip Draganic
CB	5	(Croatia) Milodrag Akmadzic
LB	3	(Albania) Ervin Ryta
RM	18	(Kosovo) Tony Preci	(substituted off) 65'
CM	6	(Canada) Chris Handsor	(substituted off) 91'
CM	7	Denny Draganic
LM	4	(Croatia) Domagoj Sain
CF	9	Leo Marasovic
CF	10	Tomislav Granic
Substitutes:
DF	15	Robert Mandekic
MF	17	Peter Bedenikovic	(substituted on) 91'
MF	14	(Croatia) Velimir Crljen	(substituted on) 65'
Manager:
(Croatia) Velimir Crljen

Assistant referees:
Steve Cahoon
Justin Pasev
Fourth official:
Ogi Panich

== 2000 scoring leaders ==
Full article: CSL Golden Boot

Position	Player's name	Nationality	Club	Goals
1	Gus Kouzmanis	Canadian	Toronto Olympians	31
2	Leo Marasovic	Canadian	Toronto Croatia	13
3	Eddy Berdusco	Canadian	Toronto Olympians	12
4	Gary McGuchan	Canadian	St. Catharines Wolves	11
5	Carlo Arghittu	Canadian	St. Catharines Wolves	10
6	Jimmy Kuzmanovski	Canadian	Oshawa Flames	9
7	Paul Moore	Canadian	Toronto Croatia	9
8	Elvis Thomas	Canadian	Toronto Olympians	9
9	Frank Zumpano	Canadian	St. Catharines Wolves	8
10	John Matas	Canadian	Toronto Olympians	8

== CPSL Executive Committee ==
The 2000 CPSL Executive Committee.

Position	Name	Nationality
Chairman:	Vincent Ursini	(Canada) Canadian
Director of Operations:	Chris Bellamy	(Canada) Canadian
Director of Discipline:	Clifford Dell	(Canada) Canadian
Director of Officials:	Tony Camacho	(Portugal) Portuguese

== Individual awards ==
The annual CPSL awards ceremony was held on October 1, 2000 after the CPSL Championship final at the German Canadian Club in London, Ontario. Where for the second straight season the Toronto Olympians went home with the most awards with 3 wins. Kouzmanis became the first player to win the Golden Boot more than once and continues to hold that distinction. Olympian veteran Bayete Smith was named the Defender of the Year for his contribution for helping the club achieve the best defensive record. Their final award was their second straight Fair Play award for being the most disciplined team throughout the season.

The league chose former NPSL and USL A-League veteran Willy Giummarra of the York Region Shooters as its MVP. The Goalkeeper of the Year was given to Piotr Libicz, a former NPSL and CNSL veteran. After managing the St. Catharines Roma Wolves to second place finish behind Toronto with only a lower goal differential Lucio Ianiero was chosen as the Coach of the Year. Jimmy Kuzmanovski of the Oshawa Flames broke London City's four year hold on the Rookie of the Year award. For his efforts Steve Cahoon went home with the Referee of the Year award.

Award	Player (Club)
CPSL Most Valuable Player	Willy Giummarra (York Region Shooters)
CPSL Golden Boot	Gus Kouzmanis (Toronto Olympians)
CPSL Goalkeeper of the Year Award	Piotr Libicz (North York Astros)
CPSL Defender of the Year Award	Bayete Smith (Toronto Olympians)
CPSL Rookie of the Year Award	Jimmy Kuzmanovski (Oshawa Flames)
CPSL Coach of the Year Award	Lucio Ianiero (St. Catharines Roma Wolves)
CPSL Referee of the Year Award	Steve Cahoon
CPSL Fair Play Award	Toronto Olympians
