= 2000 CPSL League Cup =

2000 League Cup
Tournament details
- Country: Canada
- Teams: 8

Final positions
- Champions: Toronto Olympians (3rd title)
- Runners-up: St. Catharines Roma Wolves

Tournament statistics
- Matches played: 31
- Goals scored: 95 (3.06 per match)

The 2000 CPSL League Cup was the 3rd edition of the Canadian Professional Soccer League's league cup tournament running from July through late September. Toronto Olympians successfully defended their league cup title after defeating the St. Catharines Roma Wolves 1-0 at Birchmount Stadium in Toronto, Ontario, thus establishing a tournament record of most consecutive title wins. The format used in the competition was the traditional group stage with the winners of each group receiving an automatic bye to the semi-finals.

== Group stage ==
=== Group A ===
Team	Pld	W	D	L	GF	GA	GD	Pts	Status
Glen Shields	6	3	2	1	15	11	+4	11	Advanced to the semi-final
Toronto Olympians	6	3	1	2	15	11	+4	10	
London City SC	6	3	1	2	8	7	+1	10	
Oshawa Flames	6	1	0	5	10	19	−4	3	

9 July 2000
19:00

Oshawa Flames	3–2	Toronto Olympians
Jimmy Kuzmanovski 6'; David Kohek 39'; Omar El-Behairy 40'	Report	Gus Kouzmanis 34'; Danny Sanna 76'

Oshawa Civic Stadium, Oshawa, Ontario
9 July 2000
19:00

Glen Shields	1–1	London City SC
Marco Antonucci	Report	Jurek Gebczynski

Dufferin District Field, Vaughan, Ontario

16 July 2000
19:00

Oshawa Flames	1–2	Glen Shields
Edson Breceda 28'	Report	Courtney Dennis 72', 76'

Oshawa Civic Stadium, Oshawa, Ontario
21 July 2000
20:35

London City SC	2–0	Toronto Olympians
Tonino Commisso 53'; Chris Picanco 73'	Report

Cove Road Stadium, London, Ontario

23 July 2000
19:00

Glen Shields	2–2	Toronto Olympians
	Report

Dufferin District Field, Vaughan, Ontario
23 July 2000
19:00

Oshawa Flames	0–1	London City SC
	Report

Oshawa Civic Stadium, Oshawa, Ontario

28 July 2000
20:35

London City SC	3–1	Oshawa Flames
	Report

Cove Road Stadium, London, Ontario
30 July 2000
20:00

Toronto Olympians	4–2	Oshawa Flames
Gus Kouzmanis,,,	Report	Jimmy Kuzmanovski 6'; John Lawrence 26'

Birchmount Stadium, Toronto, Ontario

4 August 2000
20:35

London City SC	0–2	Glen Shields
	Report	Mike Glasgow 75'; Courtney Dennis 83'

Cove Road Stadium, London, Ontario
6 August 2000
20:00

Toronto Olympians	4–1	Glen Shields
Gus Kouzmanis 35', 58', 67', Danny Ziannis 45'	Report	Canute Mylton 4'

Birchmount Stadium, Toronto, Ontario

9 August 2000
20:00

Glen Shields	7–3	Oshawa Flames
Phil Ionadi,,	Report

Dufferin District Field, Vaughan, Ontario
9 August 2000
20:00

Toronto Olympians	3–1	London City SC
Eddy Berdusco, Gus Kouzmanis	Report

Birchmount Stadium, Toronto, Ontario

=== Group B ===
Team	Pld	W	D	L	GF	GA	GD	Pts	Status
Toronto Croatia	6	3	2	1	8	3	+5	11	Advanced to the semi-final
St. Catharines Roma Wolves	6	3	2	1	6	3	+3	11	
York Region Shooters	6	3	0	3	10	9	+1	9	
North York Astros	6	0	2	4	2	11	−9	2	

9 July 2000
19:30

North York Astros	0–0	Toronto Croatia
	Report

Esther Shiner Stadium, Toronto, Ontario
Attendance: 100
Referee: Steve DePiero (OSA)
12 July 2000
20:00

Toronto Croatia	3–1	York Region Shooters
Paul Moore 22'; Leo Marasovic 46', 90'	Report	Gary Barbara 93'

Centennial Park Stadium, Toronto, Ontario
Attendance: 150
Referee: Steve Mortimer (OSA)

16 July 2000
19:00

York Region Shooters	1–2	St. Catharines Roma Wolves
Mike Mazza 47'	Report	Gary Hughes 73'; Frank Delpriore 91'

Richmond Green, Richmond Hill, Ontario
19 July 2000
20:15

St. Catharines Roma Wolves	0–0	North York Astros
	Report [ Report]

Club Roma Stadium, St. Catharines, Ontario
Attendance: 600

23 July 2000
19:30

North York Astros	0–2	York Region Shooters
	Report	Willy Giummarra 47'; Michael D'Angelo 82'

Esther Shiner Stadium, Toronto, Ontario
Attendance: 80
Referee: Mike Lambert (OSA)
26 July 2000
20:00

Toronto Croatia	0–0	St. Catharines Roma Wolves
	Report

Centennial Park Stadium, Toronto, Ontario
Attendance: 150
Referee: Silviu Petrescu (OSA)

30 July 2000
19:00

York Region Shooters	2–1	Toronto Croatia
	Report

Richmond Green, Richmond Hill, Ontario
30 July 2000
19:30

North York Astros	1–2	St. Catharines Roma Wolves
Gaston Bizera 71'	Report	Gary Hughes 36'; Gary McGuchan 57'

Esther Shiner Stadium, Toronto, Ontario
Attendance: 100
Referee: Isaac Raymond (OSA)

2 August 2000
20:00

York Region Shooters	4–1	North York Astros
John Bottineau 5', 67'; Bing Gao 35'; Joe Montagnese 72'	Report	Gaston Bizera 50'

Richmond Green, Richmond Hill, Ontario
Attendance: 50
Referee: Silviu Petrescu (OSA)
2 August 2000
20:15

St. Catharines Roma Wolves	0–1	Toronto Croatia
	Report [ Report]	Paul Moore 17'

Club Roma Stadium, St. Catharines, Ontario
Attendance: 250

9 August 2000
20:15

St. Catharines Roma Wolves	2–0	York Region Shooters
	Report

Club Roma Stadium, St. Catharines, Ontario
9 August 2000
20:00

Toronto Croatia	3–0	North York Astros
Joe Draganic 24'; Gaston Bizera 32' (o.g.); Paul Moore 58'	Report

Centennial Park Stadium, Toronto, Ontario
Attendance: 200
Referee: Steve DiPiero (OSA)

== Quarter-final ==
August 16, 2000	York Region Shooters	0–4	Toronto Olympians	Richmond Hill, Ontario
19:00 ET		(Report)	Peyvand Mossavat 28'; Eddy Berdusco 32'; Gus Kouzmanis 76'; Ron Belfon 91'	Stadium: Richmond Green; Attendance: 40; Referee: Silviu Petrescu (OSA)

August 25, 2000	London City SC	2–3	St. Catharines Roma Wolves	London, Ontario
20:35 ET	Steve Flatt 4'; Gentan Dervishi 43'	(Report) [ Report]	Frank Zumpano 25'; Pat Dugas 81'; Gary McGuchan 90'	Stadium: Cove Road Stadium

September 6, 2000	St. Catharines Roma Wolves	1–1	London City SC	St. Catharines, Ontario
20:25 ET	Gary Hughes 31'	(Report)	Genijan Dervishi 29'	Stadium: Club Roma Stadium

September 8, 2000	Toronto Olympians	2–0	York Region Shooters	Toronto, Ontario
20:00 ET	John Matas 6'; Eddy Berdusco 82'	(Report)		Stadium: Birchmount Stadium; Attendance: 30; Referee: Frank Marciello (OSA)

== Semi-final ==
September 22, 2000	Toronto Olympians	1–1 (a.e.t.) (3–2 p)	Toronto Croatia	Toronto, Ontario
17:45 ET	Eddy Berdusco 71'	(Report)	Joe Draganic 60'	Stadium: Birchmount Stadium
	Penalties
	Gus Kouzmanis (penalty scored); Eddy Berdusco (penalty missed); Elvis Thomas (penalty scored); Brian Bowes (penalty scored); Rick Titus (penalty missed)		Joe Draganic (penalty scored); Velimir Crljen (penalty missed); Tony Preci (penalty missed); Ervin Ryta (penalty scored); Milodrag Akmadzic (penalty missed)

September 22, 2000	Glen Shields	1–3	St. Catharines Roma Wolves	Toronto, Ontario
21:00 ET		(Report)	Carlo Arghittu 38', 81'; Gary McGuchan 82'	Stadium: Birchmount Stadium

== Final ==
September 24
15:00 ET

Toronto Olympians	1–0	St. Catharines Roma Wolves
Elvis Thomas 4'	Report

Birchmount Stadium, Toronto, Ontario
Attendance: 200
Referee: Steve Mortimer (Ontario)

GK	1	(Canada) Brian Bowes
RB	16	(Canada) Ron Belfon
CB	5	(Canada) Tony Marshall (c)
CB	13	(Canada) Danny Sanna
LB	8	(Canada) Bayete Smith
RM	17	(England) Darren Tilley
CM	9	(Canada) Elvis Thomas	(substituted off) 69'
CM	7	(Canada) John McNeal
LM	14	(Trinidad and Tobago) Rick Titus
ST	11	(Canada) Gus Kouzmanis	(substituted off) 75'
ST	23	(Canada) Eddy Berdusco
Substitutes:
GK	22	(Canada) Lee Burrows
DF	3	(Canada) Simon Black
DF	6	(Canada) Peyvand Mossavat	(substituted on) 69'
DF	15	(Canada) Louis Katsavrias
MF	18	(Canada) Phil Caporella	(substituted on) 75'
FW	10	(Canada) John Matas
Manager:
(England) David Gee

GK	1	(Canada) Dino Perri (c)
RB	2	(Canada) Danny Gallagher
CB	16	(United States) Andrew McKay
CB	19	(Canada) Gary Hughes
LB	10	(Canada) Tony Carbonara	(substituted off) 81'
RM	13	(Canada) Lucio Ianiero
CM	6	(Canada) Keith Moore
CM	17	(Canada) John Sozio
LM	22	(Canada) Gary McGuchan
ST	18	(Canada) Carlo Arghittu
ST	9	(Canada) Frank Zumpano
Substitutes:
DF	21	(Canada) Joe Carbonara
FW	8	(Canada) Pat Dugas
FW	11	(Canada) Frank Delpriore	(substituted on) 81'
Manager:
(Canada) Lucio Ianiero

Assistant referees:
Neal Schofield
Frank Marciello
Fourth official:
Eugene Doulev
