= 1999 Canadian Professional Soccer League season =

Canadian Professional Soccer League
- Season: May 28 – September 26 (regular season); October 1 – October 2 (playoffs)
- Champions: Toronto Olympians
- Regular Season title: Toronto Olympians
- Matches: 56
- Goals: 225 (4.02 per match)
- Top goalscorer: Eddy Berdusco (Toronto Olympians)
- Best goalkeeper: George Azcurra
- Biggest home win: Toronto Olympians 11–1; North York Astros (September 19, 1999)
- Biggest away win: York Region Shooters; 1–7 Toronto Olympians (June 6, 1999)
- Highest scoring: Toronto Olympians 11–1; North York Astros (September 19, 1999)

The 1999 Canadian Professional Soccer League season was the second season under the Canadian Professional Soccer League name. The season began on May 28, 1999, and concluded on October 2, 1999, with Toronto Olympians defeating Toronto Croatia 2-0 to claim their first CPSL Championship. The Olympians made history by becoming the first club in the league's history to achieve a treble. For the second straight season, they went undefeated for the entire season. The league also introduced their first All-Star match where the CPSL All-Stars faced the CSA Development team.

== Changes from 1998 season ==
All founding members of the CPSL returned with the exception of Mississauga Eagles P.S.C. The newest addition to the league were expansion franchise the Oshawa Flames. Other changes were Glen Shields changing their name to Glen Shields Sun Devils, and the York Region Shooters moving to Richmond Hill, Ontario.

=== Teams ===
Team	City	Stadium	Manager
Glen Shields Sun Devils	Vaughan, Ontario (Thornhill)	Dufferin District Field	Dave Benning
London City	London, Ontario (Westmount)	Cove Road Stadium	Tony Laferrara
North York Astros	Toronto, Ontario (North York)	Esther Shiner Stadium	Rafael Carbajal
Oshawa Flames	Oshawa, Ontario (Vanier)	Oshawa Civic Stadium	Jens Kraemer
St. Catharines Wolves	St. Catharines, Ontario (Vansickle)	Club Roma Stadium	Lucio Ianiero
Toronto Croatia	Toronto, Ontario (Etobicoke)	Centennial Park Stadium	Bruno Pilaš
Toronto Olympians	Toronto, Ontario (Scarborough)	Birchmount Stadium	David Gee
York Region Shooters	Richmond Hill, Ontario	Richmond Green	Sam Foti

Location of CPSL teams outside of Toronto for the 1999 CPSL season.

Location of CPSL teams in Toronto for the 1999 CPSL season.

== Final standings ==
Pos	Team	Pld	W	D	L	GF	GA	GD	Pts	Qualification
1	Toronto Olympians	14	13	1	0	56	7	+49	40	Qualification for Playoffs
2	Toronto Croatia	14	8	2	4	31	19	+12	26	Qualification for Playoffs
3	Glen Shields Sun Devils	14	7	4	3	34	18	+16	25	Qualification for Playoffs
4	London City	14	5	5	4	30	36	−6	20	Qualification for Playoffs
5	Oshawa Flames	14	3	6	5	19	26	−7	15	
6	St. Catharines Roma	14	3	4	7	19	30	−11	13	
7	York Region Shooters	14	3	3	8	20	34	−14	12	
8	North York Astros	14	2	1	11	16	55	−39	7	

Updated to match(es) played on September 23, 1999. Source: http://www.rocketrobinsoccerintoronto.com/99cpw17b.htm
Rules for classification: 1) points; 2) goal difference; 3) number of goals scored.

== Playoffs ==
=== Bracket ===
The top four teams qualified for a one-game semifinal that led to the championship game played on October 2 at Oshawa Civic Stadium in Oshawa, Ontario.

Semifinals
1	Toronto Olympians	4
4	London City	1
2	Toronto Croatia	5
3	Glen Shields Sun Devils	2

Final
1	Toronto Olympians	2
2	Toronto Croatia	0

=== Semifinals ===
October 1, 1999	Toronto Croatia	5–2	Glen Shields Sun Devils	Oshawa, Ontario
7:00 ET	Ivica Jelic 6'; Josip Draganic 44', 72'; Zajac 79'; Robert Mandekic 82'	(Report)	Fitzroy Powell 83'; Marco Antonucci 88'	Stadium: Oshawa Civic Stadium; Attendance: 100; Referee: Andrew Drajinsky (Ontario)

October 1, 1999	Toronto Olympians	4–1	London City	Oshawa, Ontario
9:00 ET	Gus Kouzmanis 10', 73', 84'; Capporella 33'	(Report)	Mesanovic 87'	Stadium: Oshawa Civic Stadium; Attendance: 100; Referee: Steve Mortimer (Ontario)

=== CPSL Championship ===
October 2
5:00 ET

Toronto Olympians	2–0	Toronto Croatia
Thomas 55'; Handsor 73'	Report

Oshawa Civic Stadium, Oshawa, Ontario
Attendance: 100
Referee: Tony Camacho (Ontario)

GK	1	(Canada) Brian Bowes
RB	5	Tony Marshall
CB	6	(Canada) Peyvand Mossavat
CB	4	(Canada) Ian Cardey
LB	8	(Canada) Bayete Smith
RM	9	(Canada) Elvis Thomas	(substituted off) 77'
CM	20	Danny Ziannis (c)
CM	17	(Canada) Chris Handsor	(substituted off) 84'
LM	7	(New Zealand) Daryl Holmes
ST	11	(Canada) Gus Kouzmanis	(substituted off) 79'
ST	23	(Canada) Eddy Berdusco	(substituted off) 75'
Substitutes:
GK	22	(Canada) Tom Bianchi
MF	12	Louie Ouroutzaglou
DF	16	Ron Belfon	(substituted on) 75'
DF	14	Arte Alkatov	(substituted on) 79'
MF	15	Louie Katsavrias	(substituted on) 84'
MF	13	Danny Sanna
FW	10	John Matas	(substituted on) 77'
Manager:
(England) David Gee

GK	1	(Canada) George Azcurra
RB	2	(Canada) Daniel Pilas
CB	3	Josip Draganic
CB	4	(Croatia) Domagoj Sain
LB	4	Ivica Sola
RM	6	Ivica Jelic	(substituted off) 71'
CM	20	Robert Fran
CM	9	Ante Musa
LM	10	Tom Granic (c)	(substituted off) 75'
CF	8	(Poland) Czeslaw Zajac	(substituted off) 50'
CF	11	Denny Draganic	(substituted off) 67'
Substitutes:
DF	13	Nikola Marketic	(substituted on) 75'
MF	14	Robert Mandekic	(substituted on) 67'
MF	15	Paul Grguric	(substituted on) 71'
MF	19	Peter Curic	(substituted on) 50'
Manager:
(Croatia) Bruno Pilas

Assistant referees:
Steve Cahoon
Nick Rose
Fourth official:
John Lopes

== All-Star game ==
The league's inaugural all-star match was played on September 26, 1999 at Centennial Park Stadium in Toronto, Ontario. The CPSL All-Star team was selected from the six remaining clubs that didn't compete in the CPSL League Cup final, which excluded players from the Toronto Olympians and Toronto Croatia. The Canada Development team featured players from the CSA National Training Centre which consisted of senior national team players with a mix of young prospects with USL A-League experience.

September 26
1:00 ET

CPSL All-Stars	2–1	Canada Development Team
Giummarra 17'; Giummarra 81'	Report	De Rosario 13'

Centennial Park Stadium, Toronto, Ontario
Attendance: 500
Referee: Nigel Johnson (Ontario)

GK	29	(Canada) Adam Morandini	(substituted off) 85'
RB	5	Dave McDonald
CB	15	Mike Marshall
LB	25	Gerald Gallacher	(substituted off) 35'
RM	8	Mike Kim
CM	10	(Poland) Jurek Gebczynski (c)	(substituted off) 35'
CM	13	(Canada) Lucio Ianiero
CM	7	(Canada) Phil Ionadi	(substituted off) 78'
LM	4	Mike Glasgow	(substituted off) 63'
ST	11	(Canada) Willy Giummarra
ST	17	(Canada) Marco Antonucci
Substitutes:
GK	1	(Uruguay) Rafael Carbajal	(substituted on) 85'
DF	12	JP Rickwood	(substituted on) 78'
FW	18	Dave Kohek	(substituted on) 63'
FW	16	Alex Nardi	(substituted on) 35'
FW	9	(Canada) Adrian Sciarra
DF	6	(United Kingdom) Anthony Whitney	(substituted on) 35'
Manager:
(Canada) Tony La Ferrara (England) Dave Benning

GK	1	Steve Cox
RB	2	(Canada) Carl Fletcher	(substituted off) 70'
CB	3	(Canada) Victor Oppong
CB	5	(Canada) Marco Reda
LB	6	(Canada) Nevio Pizzolitto
RM	4	(Canada) Adrian Serioux
CM	8	(Canada) Miles O'Connor
CM	11	Toll Dasterridis	(substituted off) 62'
LM	12	Jordan Gillespie
CF	9	(Canada) Semir Mesanovic
CF	10	(Canada) Dwayne De Rosario
Substitutes:
GK	22	Alim Hassin
MF	17	(Canada) Matt Smith
MF	14	(Canada) Jamie Dodds	(substituted on) 70'
MF	7	(Canada) Adrian Llewellyn	(substituted on) 62'
FW	16	(Canada) Atiba Hutchinson
Manager:
(Canada) Paul James

Assistant referees:
Steve Cahoon
O.J. Panic
Fourth official:
Stephanie Denhamm

== 1999 scoring leaders ==
Full article: CSL Golden Boot

Position	Player's name	Nationality	Club	Goals
1	Eddy Berdusco	Canada	Toronto Olympians	25
2	Elvis Thomas	Canada	Toronto Olympians	21
3	Gus Kouzmanis	Canada	Toronto Olympians	16
4	Mike Glasgow	Canada	Glen Shields	10
5	Phil Ionadi	Canada	Glen Shields	10
6	Andy Madeiros	Canada	Toronto Croatia	10
7	John Matas	Canada	Toronto Olympians	10
8	Semir Mesanovic	Canada	London City Soccer Club	10

== CPSL Executive Committee ==
The 1999 CPSL Executive Committee.

Position	Name	Nationality
Chairman:	Bill Spiers	(England) English
Director of Operations:	Chris Bellamy	(Canada) Canadian
Director of Finance:	Peter Li Preti	(Canada) Canadian
Director of Officials:	Tony Camacho	(Portugal) Portuguese

== Awards ==
=== Weekly awards ===
Week	CPSL Player of the Week		Reference
Week	Player	Club	Reference
Week 1	Semir Mesanovic	London City	
Week 2	John Matas	Toronto Olympians	
Week 3	Eddy Berdusco	Toronto Olympians	
Week 4	Gus Kouzmanis	Toronto Olympians	
Week 5	Mike Glasgow	Glen Shields Sun Devils	
Week 6	Leo Marasovic	Toronto Croatia	
Week 7	Mich D'Angelo	York Region Shooters	

=== Individual awards ===
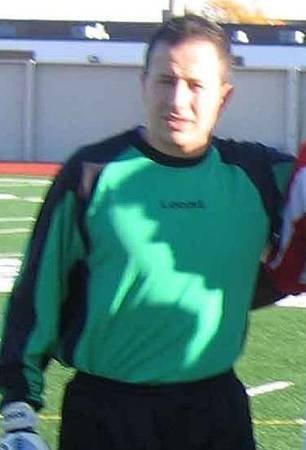
George Azcurra was voted the Goalkeeper of the Year

The CPSL held their second annual awards ceremony on November 21, 1999 at the Hollywood Princess in Concord, Ontario. The Toronto Olympians went home with the majority of the awards with 4 wins. David Gee along with Tony LaFerrara of London City won the Coach of the Year award. Gee became the first manager to win the award consecutively twice. Canadian internationals Elvis Thomas and Eddy Berdusco received the MVP and Golden Boot award. Toronto's final award was the Fair Play award for being the most disciplined team throughout the season. London City produced their fourth straight Rookie of the Year with Semir Mesanovic. While Toronto Croatia received their first CPSL club award with George Azcurra being named the Goalkeeper of the Year. Silviu Petrescu who later went on to officiate matches at the international level and Major League Soccer was recognized with the Referee of the Year award.

Award	Player (Club)
CPSL Most Valuable Player	Elvis Thomas (Toronto Olympians)
CPSL Golden Boot	Eddy Berdusco (Toronto Olympians)
CPSL Goalkeeper of the Year Award	George Azcurra (Toronto Croatia)
CPSL Rookie of the Year Award	Semir Mesanovic (London City)
CPSL Coach of the Year Award	David Gee (Toronto Olympians); Tony LaFerrara (London City)
CPSL Referee of the Year Award	Silviu Petrescu
CPSL Fair Play Award	Toronto Olympians
