= 1998 Canadian Professional Soccer League season =

Canadian Professional Soccer League
- Season: May 31 – September 30 (regular season); October 4 – October 14 (playoffs)
- Champions: St. Catharines Wolves
- Regular Season title: Toronto Olympians
- Matches: 56
- Goals: 270 (4.82 per match)
- Top goalscorer: Gus Kouzmanis (Toronto Olympians)
- Best goalkeeper: Dino Perri
- Biggest home win: Toronto Olympians 12-0 York Region Shooters (September 27, 1998)
- Biggest away win: Toronto Croatia 0-10 Toronto Olympians (August 19, 1998)
- Highest scoring: Toronto Olympians 12-0 York Region Shooters (September 27, 1998)

The 1998 Canadian Professional Soccer League season was the inaugural season under the Canadian Professional Soccer League name. The season began on May 31, 1998, and concluded on October 14, 1998, with the St. Catharines Wolves defeating the Toronto Olympians in 4-2 victory in a penalty shootout to claim the first CPSL Championship held at Centennial Park Stadium in Toronto, Ontario. Though Toronto was denied the treble they still managed to go undefeated the entire regular season, and dominate the league with the best offensive and defensive record.

The CPSL was created by an alliance forged by the Ontario Soccer Association with the Canadian National Soccer League in order to implement the Image of the Game Report to provide a suitable professional soccer structure in Ontario and potentially throughout the country for the development of players and to serve as a preliminary league for the North American top tier leagues. During the initial stages of the formation of the league it faced certain difficulties as the schedule was finalized just two weeks prior kickoff. The scheduling problem revolved mainly around the status of Toronto Italia as it disagreed with the league's policy and territory rights. Though they applied for membership it was challenged by Toronto Croatia over alleged debts being owned to them from the 1995 CNSL season. After refusing to pay the debt Italia withdrew and were refunded of its membership application fee, as a result the CPSL lost one of the country's most prestige clubs. In addition the league received sponsorship from Adidas, Labatt, and Coffee Time.

== Overview ==
=== Origins and foundation (1993–98) ===
After the demise of the Canadian Soccer League in 1992 Canada was without a Division I national professional league. The Canadian soccer landscape was fractured into several different foreign and regional senior leagues. When the CSL ceased operations three of their clubs the Vancouver Whitecaps, Toronto Blizzard, and Montreal Supra joined the American Professional Soccer League, which at the time was constituted as the highest tier league in the Canadian soccer structure. While the remaining clubs with the exception of London Lasers joined the National Soccer League the country's oldest and only exclusively Canadian professional league. After the addition of the Winnipeg Fury it changed its name to the Canadian National Soccer League.

Though the CNSL was primarily based in Ontario it operated as a private league for several years after a heated dispute with the Ontario Soccer Association. While other provinces operated with a top senior amateur league Ontario had its own senior league, but was without a sanctioned professional league for its amateur players as the CNSL was considered an outlaw league by the OSA. As a result the OSA completed a study named the Image of the Game in 1995/1996, which led to the plans of launching the Ontario Professional Soccer League as a Division III league in the Canadian soccer league system. As the OSA failed to bring their project to fruition they settled their differences with the CNSL and formed an alliance to launch the Canadian Professional Soccer League beginning with an Ontario division.

The CPSL would serve as the link between the provincial senior leagues to the USL A-League/USISL clubs, and provide opportunities for the development of youth players and referees. The intention of the league was to form regional divisions under the CPSL banner with each divisional champion competing in a playoff format for the championship. Michael Di Biase the CNSL president would serve as the commissioner, and OSA administrator Bill Spiers was named the league's chairman. The founding members included four CNSL clubs London City, North York Astros, St. Catharines Wolves, Toronto Croatia, and four of the OPSL teams Glen Shields, Mississauga Eagles, Toronto Olympians, and York Region Shooters. While the remaining CNSL teams like Toronto Italia, Toronto Supra, and Kosovo Albanians failed in successfully applying for membership.

=== Organization ===
==== Regulations ====
The Canadian Professional Soccer League was formed as a result of merger between the OSA stillborn Ontario Professional Soccer League with the Canadian National Soccer League. The original purpose of the alliance was to provide young players an opportunity to embark on a professional career. Originally operated in Ontario with the intention of expanding nationally with a similar provincial setup. Some of these regulations included:

- Rosters must have 5 U-20 Canadian players per club.
- Starting 11 must include a minimum of 2 U-20 players.
- Minimum of a Coaching C License

== Teams ==
Team	City	Stadium	Manager
Glen Shields	Vaughan, Ontario (Thornhill)	Dufferin District Field	Ron Harrison
London City	London, Ontario (Westmount)	Cove Road Stadium	Harry Gauss
Mississauga Eagles P.S.C.	Mississauga, Ontario (Malton)	Wildwood Park	Josef Komlodi
North York Astros	Toronto, Ontario (North York)	Esther Shiner Stadium	Jorge Armua
St. Catharines Wolves	St. Catharines, Ontario (Vansickle)	Club Roma Stadium	Dino Perri
Toronto Croatia	Toronto, Ontario (Etobicoke)	Centennial Park Stadium	Rudolf Belin
Toronto Olympians	Toronto, Ontario (Scarborough)	Birchmount Stadium	David Gee
York Region Shooters	Aurora, Ontario (Aurora Village)	Highland Park	Sam Foti

Location of CPSL teams outside of Toronto for the 1998 CPSL season.

Location of CPSL teams in Toronto for the 1998 CPSL season.

== Final standings ==
Pos	Team	Pld	W	D	L	GF	GA	GD	Pts	Qualification
1	Toronto Olympians (C)	14	13	1	0	73	6	+67	40	Playoffs
2	St. Catharines Wolves (O)	14	8	3	3	31	26	+5	27	Playoffs
3	Glen Shields	14	6	3	5	26	27	−1	21	Playoffs
4	North York Astros	14	6	1	7	34	30	+4	19	Playoffs
5	York Region Shooters	14	5	2	7	30	44	−14	17	
6	London City	14	4	3	7	27	42	−15	15	
7	Mississauga Eagles P.S.C.	14	3	1	10	29	44	−15	10	
8	Toronto Croatia	14	2	4	8	20	51	−31	10	

Updated to match(es) played on September 30, 1998. Source: rocketrobinsoccerintoronto.com
Rules for classification: 1) points; 2) goal difference; 3) number of goals scored.
(C) Champions; (O) Play-off winners

== Rogers Cup playoffs ==
=== Bracket ===
Semifinals
1	Toronto Olympians	5	2	7
4	North York Astros	1	0	1
2	St. Catharines Wolves	1	4	5
3	Glen Shields	1	0	1

Final
1	Toronto Olympians	2 (2)
4	St. Catharines Wolves	2 (4)

=== Semifinals ===
October 4, 1998	North York Astros	1–5	Toronto Olympians	Toronto, Ontario
7:30 ET	Alejandro Martinez 86'	(Report)	Holmes 4'; Berdusco 27' 58'; John Matas 41'; Kouzmanis 76'	Stadium: Esther Shiner Stadium; Attendance: 100; Referee: Glenn Sharkey (Ontario)

October 4, 1998	Glen Shields	2–1	St. Catharines Wolves	Thornhill, Ontario
8:00 ET	Ionadi 20'; Angelo Donia (yellow card) 74' (yellow-red card); Peter Firebrace 77'	(Report)	Tony Carbonara 86'	Stadium: Dufferin District Field; Attendance: 80; Referee: Steve Mortimer (Ontario)

Toronto Olympians advanced to the semi-final as a result of a 2-0 forfeit.

October 7, 1998	Toronto Olympians	2–0	North York Astros	Toronto, Ontario
8:00 ET				Stadium: Birchmount Stadium

October 12, 1998	St. Catharines Wolves	4–0	Glen Shields	St. Catharines, Ontario
8:15 ET	Arghittu 8', 24', 36'; Gary McGuchan 89'	[]		Stadium: Club Roma Stadium; Referee: Mike Cvetanovich

=== CPSL Championship ===
October 14
8:15 ET

Toronto Olympians	2–2	St. Catharines Wolves
Berdusco 58', 84'	Report	Keith Moore 2'; Gary McGuchan 88'
Penalties
Kouzmanis (penalty scored); Berdusco (penalty scored); Lopez (penalty missed); Ian Cardey (penalty missed)	2 – 4	Keith Moore (penalty scored); Joe Carbonara (penalty missed); Arghittu (penalty scored); Gary McGutchan (penalty scored); Ianiero (penalty scored)

Centennial Park Stadium, Toronto, Ontario
Attendance: 80
Referee: Gordon Arrowsmith (Ontario)

GK	1	(Canada) Brian Bowes
RB	18	(Canada) Dino Lopez
CB	4	(Canada) Ian Cardey
LB	5	Tony Marshall
RM	6	(Canada) Peyvand Mossavat	(substituted off) 59'
CM	20	Danny Ziannis
CM	7	(China) Gong Lei
LM	16	(New Zealand) Daryl Holmes
ST	23	(Canada) Eddy Berdusco
ST	11	(Canada) Gus Kouzmanis
ST	17	John Matas
Substitutes:
DF	12	Louie Oroutzaglou
DF	15	Louie Katsavrias
MF	2	Ron Belfon	(substituted on) 59'
Manager:
(England) David Gee

GK	1	(Canada) Dino Perri
RB	10	Tony Carbonara
CB	4	Albert Reinhart
CB	7	John McNeil
LB	11	(Canada) John Sozio
RM	19	Joe Carbonara
CM	13	(Canada) Lucio Ianiero
CM	5	Keith Moore
LM	22	Gary McGuchan
CF	9	(Canada) Jerry Cipriani	(substituted off) 69'
CF	18	(Canada) Carlo Arghittu
Substitutes:
DF	5	John Orme	(substituted on) 69'
MF	17	Marco Antonio Marino
FW	15	Luciano Berardocco
FW	14	Anwar Ahmad
Manager:
(Canada) Dino Perri

Assistant referees:
Glenn Sharkey
Zack Kontoulis

== Season statistics ==
=== Goals ===
Full article: CSL Golden Boot

Position	Player	Nationality	Club	Goals
1	Gus Kouzmanis	Canada	Toronto Olympians	33
2	Eddy Berdusco	Canada	Toronto Olympians	19
3	Gong Lei	China	Toronto Olympians	17
4	Gary McGuchan	Canada	St. Catharines Wolves	15
5	Ivan Jurisic	Serbia	North York Astros	12
6	Carlo Arghittu	Canada	St. Catharines Wolves	12

=== Hat-tricks ===
Player	Club	Against	Result	Date
(Federal Republic of Yugoslavia) Ivan Jurisic	North York Astros	London City	7–0 (H)	2 August 1998
Gus Kouzmanis	Toronto Olympians	Toronto Croatia	10–0 (A)	19 August 1998
John Matas	Toronto Olympians	Toronto Croatia	10–0 (A)	19 August 1998
Peter Firebrace	Glen Shields Sun Devils	York Region Shooters	4–3 (H)	20 September 1998
(Canada) Jerry Cipriani	St. Catharines Wolves	Toronto Croatia	4–3 (A)	23 September 1998
Gus Kouzmanis	Toronto Olympians	York Region Shooters	12–0 (H)	27 August 1998

== CPSL Executive Committee ==
The 1998 CPSL Executive Committee.

Position	Name	Nationality
Chairman	Bill Spiers	(England) English
Commissioner	Michael Di Biase	(Canada) Canadian
Committee Member	Peter Li Preti	(Canada) Canadian
Committee Member	Walter Kircher	(Canada) Canadian
Committee Member	Brian Avey	(Canada) Canadian

== Individual awards ==
The CPSL presented their inaugural team awards on December 18, 1998 at the Soccer Centre in Woodbridge, Ontario. The majority of the awards were taken by the former CNSL teams with North York Astros, St. Catharines Wolves, and London City receiving four awards. While the Toronto Olympians with London City won the most awards with two wins. After leading the Olympians to an undefeated regular season David Gee was named the Coach of the Year. The regular season champions had Gus Kouzmanis the 1996 CNSL Rookie of the Year win the Golden Boot. For the third straight season London City managed to produce another Rookie of the Year with Tom Bianchi, and win the Fair Play award for being the most disciplined team..

The remainder of the awards went to North York, and St. Catharines with former CNSL veterans Dino Perri, and Rene Martin taking home the Goalkeeper and MVP awards. The league also gave recognition to the best official by introducing the Referee of the Year award with Bill Teeuwen being its first recipient.

Award	Player (Club)
CPSL Most Valuable Player	Rene Martin (North York Astros)
CPSL Golden Boot	Gus Kouzmanis (Toronto Olympians)
CPSL Goalkeeper of the Year Award	Dino Perri (St. Catharines Wolves)
CPSL Rookie of the Year Award	Tom Bianchi (London City)
CPSL Coach of the Year Award	David Gee (Toronto Olympians)
CPSL Referee of the Year Award	Bill Teeuwen
CPSL Fair Play Award	London City
