= List of Canadian Soccer League seasons =

The Canadian Soccer League is a Canadian professional league for soccer clubs primarily located in the province of Ontario. It is a Non-FIFA league previously sanctioned by the Canadian Soccer Association (CSA) and is now a member of the Soccer Federation of Canada (SFC). As of 2025, it consists of four teams, all located in Ontario. Each year, the league uses a playoff format to determine the overall champion. From 2002 until 2009, the league also operated an Eastern and Western Conference, followed by an International and National Division.

Thirteen clubs have won the CSL Championship: Toronto Croatia (6 times), Scarborough SC (4), FC Continentals (3), York Region Shooters (3), St. Catharines Wolves (2), Serbian White Eagles (2), Brampton Hitmen, Brantford Galaxy, Oakville Blue Devils, Ottawa Wizards, SC Waterloo Region, Toronto Olympians, and Trois-Rivieres Attak. The highest-ranked CSL Golden Boot goalscorer is Gus Kouzmanis with 33 goals during the league's inaugural season. Kouzmanis and Serhiy Ivlyev have won the award the most times (2), with Kouzmanis in the 1998 and 2000 seasons and Ivlyev in the 2016 and 2023 seasons. Trinidadian Kevin Nelson was the first foreigner to win the award in 2001.

== Seasons ==
| * | Winner of the league double |

| Season | Champion | Regular season | Top scorer | Ref |
|---|---|---|---|---|
| 1998 | St. Catharines Wolves | Toronto Olympians | Gus Kouzmanis | |
| 1999 | Toronto Olympians* | Toronto Olympians* | Eddy Berdusco | |
| 2000 | Toronto Croatia | Toronto Olympians | Gus Kouzmanis | |
| 2001 | St. Catharines Wolves | Ottawa Wizards | Kevin Nelson | |
| 2002 | Ottawa Wizards* | Ottawa Wizards (Note: Eastern conference) Toronto Croatia (Note: Western conference) | Darren Tilley | |
| 2003 | Brampton Hitmen | Ottawa Wizards Hamilton Thunder | Carlo Arghittu | |
| 2004 | Toronto Croatia | Toronto Supra Hamilton Thunder | Paul Munster | |
| 2005 | Oakville Blue Devils | Vaughan Shooters Hamilton Thunder | Aaron Byrd | |
| 2006 | Italia Shooters | Serbian White Eagles (Note: International division) Oakville Blue Devils (Note: National division) | Gabriel Pop | |
| 2007 | Toronto Croatia | Serbian White Eagles St. Catharines Wolves | Nicolas Lesage | |
| 2008 | Serbian White Eagles | Italia Shooters Trois-Rivières Attak | Daniel Nascimento | |
| 2009 | Trois-Rivières Attak* | Serbian White Eagles Trois-Rivières Attak | Reda Agourram | |
| 2010 | Brantford Galaxy | York Region Shooters | Tihomir Maletić | |
| 2011 | Toronto Croatia | SC Toronto | Stefan Vukovic | |
| 2012 | Toronto Croatia* | Toronto Croatia* | Dražen Vuković | |
| 2013 | SC Waterloo | Kingston FC | Guillaume Surot | |
| 2014 | York Region Shooters* | York Region Shooters* | Marin Vučemilović-Grgić | |
| 2015 | Toronto Croatia | Serbian White Eagles | Richard West | |
| 2016 | Serbian White Eagles | York Region Shooters | Serhiy Ivlyev | |
| 2017 | York Region Shooters | FC Vorkuta | Aleksandar Stojiljković | |
| 2018 | FC Vorkuta | FC Ukraine United | Sani Dey | |
| 2019 | Scarborough SC | FC Vorkuta | Mykola Temniuk | |
| 2020 | FC Vorkuta | Scarborough SC | Moussa Limane | |
| 2021 | Scarborough SC | FC Vorkuta | Wabila Wallace | |
| 2022 | FC Continentals | Serbian White Eagles | Vladimir Strizović | |
| 2023 | N/A (Note: Scarborough were the regular season champions as the playoffs weren't contested) | Scarborough SC | Serhiy Ivlyev | |
| 2024 | N/A (Note: Serbian White Eagles were the regular season champions as the playoffs weren't contested) | Serbian White Eagles | Nikola Timotijević | |
| 2025 | Scarborough SC* | Scarborough SC* | Devroy Grey; Erick Hernández | |
