= Elvis Thomas (soccer, born 1972) =

Canadian soccer player

Personal information
- Full name: Elvis Thomas
- Date of birth: July 27, 1972 (age 54)
- Place of birth: Scarborough, Ontario, Canada
- Height: 6 ft 0 in (1.83 m)
- Position: Striker

Youth career
- Neil McNeil Maroons

College career
Years	Team	Apps	(Gls)
1990–1994	Hartford Hawks		

Senior career*
Years	Team	Apps	(Gls)
1996	Connecticut Wolves	12	(1)
1997–1998	Toronto Lynx	50	(12)
1998	Montreal Impact	3	(0)
1999–2000	Toronto Olympians	31	(30)
2000–2001	Toronto ThunderHawks (indoor)	33	(11)
2002–2003	Toronto Lynx	37	(4)
2003	Vaughan Sun Devils	6	(0)
Total		139	(47)

International career^{‡}
1999–2000	Canada	3	(0)
Medal record
Representing Canada
Men's soccer
CONCACAF Gold Cup
Winner	2000 United States
- * Club domestic league appearances and goals as of 29 November 2009 ‡ National team caps and goals as of 29 November 2009

Elvis Thomas (born July 27, 1972) is a former Canadian soccer player.

He spent the majority of his soccer career in North America, primarily playing for clubs in Canada. Thomas' greatest achievements were spent with the Toronto Lynx, and the Toronto Olympians, where he won a league title and two Open Canada Cups with the Olympians; he was also awarded the Canadian Professional Soccer League MVP Award.

Internationally, Thomas has represented Canada at the senior level, by being capped a total of three times. He is first CPSL player to be called up for the national team, while playing in the league.

== Club career ==
Thomas began playing soccer during his tenure at the University of Hartford. During his four-year tenure at Hartford Thomas' accomplishments were being named All-New England and First Team All-Conference in 1993 and 1994, and serving captain in both those seasons. Also helped the Hawks earn a spot on the All-Conference Championship postseason team in 1991, 1992, and 1994. He was the Championship MVP in 1992. Upon graduating from Hartford Thomas was drafted by the Connecticut Wolves of the USISL Select League in 1996.

The following season the USISL Select League merged with the A-League, which resulted in Thomas returning to his hometown to sign with the newly expansion franchise Toronto Lynx. The signing of Thomas was announced in a press conference where the Lynx unveiled their roster for their debut season. Thomas made his debut on April 12, 1997 in a match against Jacksonville Cyclones, where he made history by scoring the franchise's first goal; unfortunately the match ended in 3–1 defeat. On May 3 Thomas in a match against the Worcester Wildfire Thomas contributed by scoring the second goal in a 3–1 victory, which marked the first victory for the Toronto side. Thomas would continue his fine form by recording another goal in a 3–0 victory over the Richmond Kickers on May 11. He helped the Lynx to set a franchise and A-league record of ten straight wins; their streak came to an end with a 1–0 defeat to Long Island Rough Riders on June 22. He finished his rookie season with six goals that helped the Lynx clinch a playoff spot. During the club's playoff run Thomas started in the first leg of the semi-final match against the Montreal Impact where the Lynx were defeated 2–1. Unfortunately for the Lynx they were defeated 4–0 in the second leg of the semi-final match, which resulted in a 6–1 victory on aggregate for Montreal. In 1998 Thomas recorded his first goal of the season in a 2–1 defeat to his former club Connecticut. On August 26 the Toronto Lynx traded Thomas to rivals Montreal Impact for future considerations and an undisclosed amount of cash. In Montreal Thomas appeared in only three matches and led the Impact to the Conference Semi-finals. In the post season, Thomas recorded two goals for the Impact in the Eastern Conference semifinals against Rochester Rhinos.

Thomas left Montreal in September 1999, when new ownership opted against fielding an outdoor squad in order to properly prepare for the 1999-2000 indoor season. Resulting in Thomas to sign with the Toronto Olympians of the Canadian Professional Soccer League. He made his debut on June 6, 1999 against York Region Shooters where he even managed to score two goals in a 7–1 victory. During the 1999 season, he was instrumental in leading his club to the Treble, and setting a league record by becoming the first CPSL franchise to finish the season undefeated. The season was a productive one for Thomas, as he scored 25 goals in all competitions. In doing so he led the Olympians to their first Rogers Cup triumph, where he scored the opening goal in a 2–0 victory over Toronto Croatia on October 2 in the CPSL playoff finals match. Thomas was further instrumental during Toronto's quest to claim their second consecutive Open Canada Cup. In the tournament Thomas contributed by registering five goals that led the Scarborough side to the finals, where their opponents were Toronto Croatia. During the finals the Olympians were leading the match with a one-goal lead, until Thomas struck two stunning goals to allow the match to culminate to a 3–0 victory. Once the season came to a conclusion Thomas was named the CPSL MVP Award. Due to a sensational debut season he received his first cap for the national side and was part of the winning team in the 2000 CONCACAF Gold Cup.

During the 2000 season, Thomas was again instrumental in Toronto's exceptionally successful campaign; together with the likes of Gus Kouzmanis, Eddy Berdusco, and Darren Tilley, Thomas led the Olympians to a 10-game undefeated streak, as well as claiming the Open Canada Cup in the process. The victory in claiming the Open Cup marked the first time in league history a club winning the trophy three consecutive years in a row. Thomas was responsible for scoring the lone goal that would clinch the title for the Scarborough-based club, in a 1–0 victory over St. Catharines Roma Wolves. Thomas finished the season with nine goals placing him third in most goals scored for the Olympians. Though he did manage to lead his team to the playoff finals, they were defeated by Toronto Croatia by a score of 2–1.

Shortly after the season Thomas announced a leave of absence in order to pursue a career in teaching. He made his return to soccer a year later when he returned to the A-League to sign with his former club Toronto Lynx. Thomas was signed on April 20, 2002 in a press conference held by the Lynx. He scored his first goal of the season on April 27, 2002 in a 2–1 victory over Hampton Roads Mariners. He nearly helped the Lynx make the playoffs, where the Lynx required a victory in the final game of season against Atlanta Silverbacks, but unfortunately the match resulted in a tie for the Lynx, which allowed Charlotte Eagles to clinch the final playoff berth. On March 18, 2003 the Toronto Lynx re-signed Thomas to a one-year contract. Thomas concluded the season with two goals, but unfortunately the Lynx failed to reach the post season for the third year straight. As his contract expired at the end of season, Thomas played the remainder of the season in the CPSL with Vaughan Sun Devils. He made his debut on September 12, 2003 against Hamilton Thunder. He helped secure a postseason berth by finishing third in the Eastern Conference. In the first round of the playoffs he contributed a goal in a 4–3 victory over Toronto Supra. Vaughan reached the CPSL Championship final against Brampton Hitmen, but Thomas didn't feature in the match. After the 2003 season he retired from professional soccer in order to continue on teaching. In 2006 it was announced that Thomas was inducted into the University of Hartford Hall of Fame.

Thomas had a stint in the National Professional Soccer League with the short lived expansion franchise the Toronto ThunderHawks during the 2000-2001 winter indoor season. He helped the ThunderHawks reach the postseason by finishing second in the National Conference, and reached the Conference finals where they were defeated by the Milwaukee Wave.

== International career ==
He made his debut for Canada in an October 1999 CONCACAF Gold Cup qualification match against Haiti and went on to earn a total of 3 caps, scoring no goals. He was in Canada's title-winning squad at the 2000 CONCACAF Gold Cup, but did not play himself. His final international was a January 2000 friendly match against Bermuda.

== Coaching career ==
He now works for Neil McNeil Catholic Secondary School as a Cooperative Education teacher.

== Honors ==
=== Player ===
Toronto Olympians

- CPSL Championship: 1999
- Open Canada Cup: 1999, 2000
- Canadian Professional Soccer League Regular Season Champions: 1999, 2000

Canada

- CONCACAF Gold Cup: 2000

=== Individual ===
- Canadian Professional Soccer League MVP: 1999
