= Mešanović =

Mešanović (Bosnian pronunciation: [meʃǎːnoʋitɕ]) is a Bosnian surname. Notable people with the surname include:

- Alen Mešanović (born 1975), former Bosnian footballer
- Enes Mešanović (born 1975), Bosnian football manager former player
- Jasmin Mešanović (born 1992), Bosnian footballer
- Muris Mešanović (born 1990), Bosnian footballer
- Semir Mesanovic (born 1981), former Bosnian-Canadian soccer player
