= David Gee (soccer) =

Personal information
- Full name: David Gee
- Place of birth: Liverpool, England

Managerial career
- Years: Team
- 1985–1986: Toronto Emeralds
- 1988–1990: Ryerson Rams
- 1995: Toronto Rockets
- 1995: Toronto Italia
- 1997: Toronto Lynx (assistant coach)
- 1998–2002: Toronto Olympians

David Gee is an English soccer head coach, businessman, and league administrator of the Ontario Soccer League. He also serves as operations manager for League1 Ontario.

== Administrative career ==
Gee was originally trained at the Liverpool F.C. Academy before emigrating to Canada in 1982. Once in Canada, he served as the general manager for Soccerworld II in Mississauga, Ontario, and eventually formed his own management company, DG Sports Inc in 1993. He originally negotiated with the city of Mississauga to promote soccer matches at Hangar 66. In 2001, he purchased the Toronto Olympians from Coffee Time founder Tom Michalopoulos and retained his position as head coach and general manager. Gee also attempted to promote indoor soccer in 1998 by applying for a National Professional Soccer League franchise in Mississauga.

In 2004, Gee sold his club to John O'Neil, the Director of the Durham Region Soccer Association. In 2014, he became operations manager for League1 Ontario as his management company began operating the league along with the Ontario Soccer League and Ontario Academy Soccer League. The Ontario Soccer Association awarded the President's Award to DG Sports Inc.

== Managerial career ==
Gee began his managerial career in 1985 in the Premier Division of the Toronto and District League with Toronto Emeralds, and secured the Ontario Cup. In 1988, he served as the team manager for the North York Rockets in the Canadian Soccer League. He later served as the head coach for the Ryerson Rams at the college level. In early February 1995, he was named the head coach for the Toronto Rockets in the A-League, but the team folded before the commencement of the 1995 season. For the remainder of the 1995 season, he coached Toronto Italia in the Canadian National Soccer League.

In 1997, he was given the position of general manager and assistant coach for the Toronto Lynx of the USL A-League. He was primarily responsible for assembling and organizing the club's first roster. Gee brought in international imports Martin Dugas, Lei Gong, and Darren Tilley, and the local Canadian National Soccer League players. Later in the season, Gee resigned from his position after differences with the team owners. Gee was credited by team officials and players for organizing a capable team to perform in the A-League.

In 1998, Gee was appointed the head coach of the Toronto Olympians in the Canadian Professional Soccer League. He assembled a credible squad primarily due to sponsorship money from Coffee Time and team owner Tom Michalopoulos. During his tenure with the organization, he established Toronto as a powerhouse and a championship dynasty within the league. For his efforts, the league awarded him the league's Coach of the Year award in 1998 and 1999. On June 20, 2001, he purchased the club from Coffee Time Donuts and retained his position as head coach and general manager.

In 2002, Gee relocated his club to Mississauga and relinquished his role as head coach to Darren Tilley and Tony Laferrara in 2003. In 2004, Gee sold his club to John O'Neil, the Director of the Durham Region Soccer Association. In 2015, the Ontario Soccer League awarded Gee the Ted Coombs award.

== Honors ==
=== Manager ===
Toronto Emeralds

- Ontario Cup: 1985

Toronto Olympians

- CPSL Championship: 1999
- CPSL League Cup: 1998, 1999, 2000
- Canadian Professional Soccer League Regular Season: 1998, 1999, 2000

Individual

- CPSL Coach of the Year: 1998, 1999
