= Rick Titus (soccer) =

Trinidadian footballer

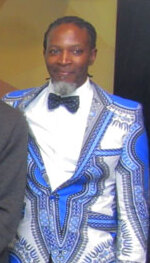
- Titus in 2019

Personal information
- Full name: Rick Wayne Titus
- Date of birth: 10 March 1969 (age 57)
- Place of birth: Mississauga, Ontario, Canada
- Height: 1.85 m (6 ft 1 in)
- Position: Defender

Youth career
- North Mississauga SC

College career
Years	Team	Apps	(Gls)
- Toronto Varsity Blues

Senior career*
Years	Team	Apps	(Gls)
1988–1995	Toronto Italia		
1995	Scarborough Astros	8	(0)
1996	St. Catharines Wolves	9	(0)
1996–1997	Toronto Shooting Stars (indoor)	20	(12)
1996–1997	Edmonton Drillers (indoor)	13	(4)
1997–1998	Toronto Lynx	49	(1)
1997–1998	Montreal Impact (indoor)	17	(2)
1997–1998	Buffalo Blizzard (indoor)	15	(7)
1998	Edmonton Drillers (indoor)	11	(2)
1998–1999	Quan Li		
1999	Philadelphia KiXX (indoor)	14	(3)
1999	Hershey Wildcats	17	(0)
1999	Staten Island Vipers	11	(0)
1999–2000	Edmonton Drillers (indoor)	48	(29)
2000–2001	Buffalo Blizzard (indoor)		
2000–2001	Vancouver 86ers/Whitecaps	44	(1)
2000	→ Toronto Olympians (loan)	1	(0)
2002	Colorado Rapids	25	(0)
2003	Charleston Battery	15	(0)
2004	Edmonton Aviators	6	(0)
2004	Toronto Lynx	1	(0)
2004	Charleston Battery	12	(0)
2005–2008	Toronto Lynx	61	(0)
2008	→ Toronto FC (loan)	1	(0)
2008–2010	Italia/York Region Shooters	45	(1)

International career
2002	Trinidad and Tobago	4	(0)

Managerial career
- 2005–2015: North Mississauga SC
- 2016–2017: UTM Eagles
- 2017–: Master's Futbol
- 2017–2019: Caribbean Stars AC (indoor)
- 2019: Mississauga MetroStars (indoor)
- * Club domestic league appearances and goals

Rick Wayne Titus (born 10 March 1969) is a Canadian-born Trinidadian soccer coach and former professional player. He played as a defender. He is the former head coach of the Masters FA League 1 team after winning a championship in 2019, and the University of Toronto Mississauga Eagles soccer team. Born with Indigenous ancestry, he announced he will be changing his name to Netshetep Ma'at, which is an Ancient Egyptian Order name as well as Songan Ohitekha Tawa El (which means Strong Brave Sun), an Indigenous Appellation name.

Throughout his playing career he competed in all levels of the American and Canadian soccer pyramid system. Originally beginning in his native country in the National Soccer League, soon after to the USL A-League, and eventually reaching the highest level of soccer in North America with the Major League Soccer. After reaching the MLS, he would shift between various United Soccer Leagues clubs, until returning to the MLS on a loan deal and appeared in a single match at the age of 39. He would concluded his outdoor career in the USL Premier Development League and Canadian Soccer League. Titus also competed in indoor soccer with various clubs in the National Professional Soccer League, and played at the international level with the Trinidad and Tobago national football team.

After his retirement from competitive soccer he made the transition to the managerial side. He received his first experience in coaching as a player/assistant coach for the Toronto Lynx in the PDL in 2007. He later joined the TFC Academy managerial staff as the U14 head coach, and subsequently began coaching in League1 Ontario initially with North Mississauga SC.

== Playing career ==
=== Early years: 1986–1996 ===
After playing college soccer with the Toronto Varsity Blues at the University of Toronto he signed with the Toronto Blizzard, but due to shortage of funds he ended up playing his youth soccer after three months; he then signed for the Toronto Italia in 1988 of the National Soccer League playing with Italia until 1995. In 1995, midway through the season he was traded to the Scarborough Astros. During his tenure in Scarborough he helped the club reach the Umbro Cup finals against St. Catharines Wolves, but lost the penalty shootout by a score of 3–0. In 1996, Titus signed with St. Catharines Wolves where he claimed the Umbro cup by finishing first in the cup standings. He featured in the two game finals match against his former club Toronto Italia, but were defeated by a score of 11–0 goals on aggregate.

He began playing indoor soccer in 1996 in the National Professional Soccer League with the Toronto Shooting Stars. During the season he was traded to the Edmonton Drillers, where he would eventually have a noted tenure by playing three separate seasons with the organization. Where he became a league all star in the 1999–2000 season, but later was selected by the Buffalo Blizzard in the dispersal draft after the folding of Edmonton. However the Blizzard would fold at the end of the season and the Milwaukee Wave selected Titus in the August 2001 dispersal draft.

=== USL A-League: 1997–2001 ===
In the spring of 1997 he signed for the newly established Toronto Lynx of the USL A-League. In his two-year stint he was named the 1997 and 1998 Lynx Defensive Player of the Year. In the winter off season he continued to playing the NPSL with the Montreal Impact in 1997, and was later traded to the Buffalo Blizzard.

In 1998, he went overseas to play for Quan Li, a team managed by former Lynx teammate Gong Lei in China. After a brief stint abroad he returned to the NPSL to play with Philadelphia KiXX for the 1998–1999 indoor season. Titus moved to the Hershey Wildcats for the 1999 A-League season, but was traded midway through the season to Staten Island Vipers for cash and a first round draft pick. On 13 June 2000, Titus signed for the Vancouver 86er, where he was named Vancouver's 2000 Defensive Player of the Year and Second Team All A-League. In 2001, he was named the A-League Defender of the Year and First Team All A-League.

When the 2000 A-League season came to a conclusion he was loaned out to the Toronto Olympians in the Canadian Professional Soccer League. He made his debut for the club in the Open Canada Cup semi-final match against the Toronto Croatia, which resulted in 3–2 victory for the club in penalties. He appeared in the Open Cup tournament final against his former club St. Catharines, and won the cup in a 1–0 victory. In the postseason he scored the lone goal in the semi-final match against Glen Shields, which advanced Toronto to the finals. In the finals the Olympians where defeated by Toronto Croatia by a score of 2–1.

=== MLS and USL First Division: 2002–2006 ===
This brought Titus to the attention of Major League Soccer scouts and he signed with the Colorado Rapids as a Discovery Player for the 2002 season. He started all 25 games in which he played, and at the end of the season he was awarded the ADT Defensive Player of the Year award. The Rapids put him on waivers in October 2002. On 12 March 2003, Titus signed a two-year contract with the Charleston Battery, helping them win the 2003 USL A-League Championship. At the end of the season he requested a release from his contract to join the Edmonton Aviators, and signed a three-year contract.

Shortly into the season he was released from his contract, and on 19 June 2004, he returned to the Toronto Lynx. After less than a week with the Lynx, he fell out with the management which led his release from his contract by mutual consent on 7 July. He then rejoined the Charleston Battery for the remainder of the season. The following season he returned to the Lynx for a third playing stint. In 2006, Titus became team vice-captain, and featured in the Open Canada Cup final against Ottawa St. Anthony Italia. At the conclusion of the season he was named the 2006 Toronto Lynx Most Valuable Player, and was a four-time member of the United Soccer League's team of the week.

=== PDL and CSL: 2007–2010 ===
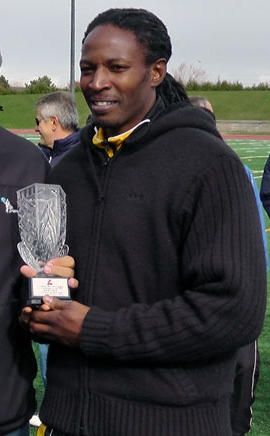
Rick Titus wins CSL Defender of the Year in 2010

When the 2006 season ended the Lynx organization decided for financial reasons to drop two divisions to the Premier Development League. Titus was one of few seniors players to remain with the Lynx for the 2007 season, where he was named player/assistant coach for Toronto. In 2008, Titus helped the Lynx reach the playoffs for the first time since 2000, but unfortunately for the Lynx, the Cleveland Internationals scored a late winner to take the game 2–1, sending the Lynx home early.

In 2008, he went on loan to Toronto FC for one game against Chivas USA in Major League Soccer. This was due to Toronto missing nine first-team players due to international duty, and in order to protect his amateur status he was unpaid for his Toronto FC appearance. After the conclusion of the PDL season he returned to the Canadian Soccer League and signed with the York Region Shooters. During his tenure with York Region he helped clinch the International Division title in 2008, and the regular season title in 2010. He was awarded the CSL Defender of the Year award in 2010.

== International career ==
He made his international debut for the Trinidad and Tobago national team on 15 November 2002, against St. Kitts and Nevis national football team in the 2003 CONCACAF Gold Cup qualification. He later appeared in four Gold Cup qualifier matches in 2002.

== Managerial career ==
In 2012 Rick Titus would coach the 98 boys youth team at North Mississauga Soccer Club. The team would go on to win the Ontario Cup and eventually the Canadian National Championship. Also, the 98 boys would also be named the number one sports team at the Mississauga Sports Council banquet. In 2007, he gained his first experience in managing at a professional club as an assistant coach for the Toronto Lynx in the USL Premier Development League under Duncan Wilde. He later was appointed the head coach for the TFC Academy U14 team, and also a regional scout for the Mississauga/Brampton region. In 2016, he became the head coach for North Mississauga SC in League1 Ontario, and was named the head coach for the UTM Eagles men's team at the University of Toronto Mississauga. In 2017, he was appointed the head coach for Masters FA Saints. In the 2017 winter season he was appointed head coach for Caribbean Stars AC in the Arena Premier League.

In 2019, he replaced Phil Ionadi as head coach for the Mississauga MetroStars in the Major Arena Soccer League. In 2019, he would go on to win the League 1 Ontario Championship with Masters FA In 2021, he would go on to the semi-finals of the League 1 Ontario Championship, losing to the eventual 2021 Champions from Guelph.
