= Lucas Papaconstantinou =

Canadian soccer player

Personal information
- Full name: Loukas Papaconstantinou
- Date of birth: May 10, 1974 (age 52)
- Place of birth: Toronto, Canada
- Position: Goalkeeper

College career
Years	Team	Apps	(Gls)
1993–1996	UAB Blazers	76	(0)

Senior career*
Years	Team	Apps	(Gls)
1997–1998	Darlington	1	(0)
1998	Toronto Olympians	10	(0)
- * Club domestic league appearances and goals as of 05 April 2015

Loukas "Lucas" Papaconstantinou (born May 10, 1974) is a Canadian former soccer player who played in The Football League, and the Canadian Professional Soccer League.

== Playing career ==
Papaconstantinou played for the UAB Blazers in college, making 76 appearances from 1993 to 1996. He began his professional career with Darlington F.C. of the Football League Two in 1997. He made his debut for the club on September 27, 1997 against Mansfield Town F.C. After one season in England he returned to Canada to sign with the Toronto Olympians of the Canadian Professional Soccer League. He made his debut for Toronto on June 7, 1998 in an Open Canada Cup match against the York Region Shooters. He helped the Olympians achieve a 10-game undefeated streak, before his departure from professional soccer in order to pursue a dental career.
