= Chris Handsor =

Canadian former soccer player (born 1972)

Personal information
- Full name: Christian Handsor
- Date of birth: January 14, 1972 (age 54)
- Place of birth: Toronto, Ontario, Canada
- Height: 6 ft 1 in (1.85 m)
- Position: Defender

Senior career*
Years	Team	Apps	(Gls)
1995	St. Catharines Wolves		
1995–1996	Cleveland Crunch (indoor)	25	(19)
1996	Charleston Battery	0	(0)
1996	Philadelphia KiXX (indoor)	7	(2)
1996–1997	Toronto Shooting Stars (indoor)	19	(16)
1997	Toronto Supra		
1998–1999	Toronto Olympians		
1998-2000	Edmonton Drillers Indoor)	73	(41)
1999	Atlanta Silverbacks	17	(1)
2000	Toronto Croatia	5	(0)
2000	Kansas City Attack (indoor)	8	(7)
2000–2001	Buffalo Blizzard (indoor)	19	(18)
2001	Vancouver Whitecaps	1	(0)
2001–2003	Philadelphia KiXX (indoor)	66	(53)
2003–2004	Baltimore Blast (indoor)	34	(15)
2004	Edmonton Aviators	12	(0)
2004	Toronto Lynx	5	(0)
2004–2005	Cleveland Force (indoor)	32	(27)
2006–2007	Chicago Storm (indoor)	23	(13)
2007–2008	California Cougars (indoor)	15	(11)
2008–2010	Denver Dynamite (indoor)	16	(17)
2010–2011	California Cougars (indoor)	5	(7)
- * Club domestic league appearances and goals as of 26 April 2015

Chris Handsor (born January 14, 1972) is a Canadian former soccer player who played outdoor and indoor primarily in the USL A-League, National Professional Soccer League, and the Canadian Professional Soccer League.

== Playing career ==
Handsor began his professional career in the Canadian National Soccer League in 1995 with the St. Catharines Wolves. In his debut season with St. Catharines he would achieve a treble – winning the Umbro Cup, League Championship, and League Playoff Championship. At the conclusion of the season he was awarded the CNSL MVP award. In 1996, he signed with the Charleston Battery of the USISL Pro League. During his tenure with Charleston he failed to feature in a single appearance; resulting in Handsor to return to the CNSL to sign with the Toronto Supra . With Supra he repeated his treble success winning all three trophies throughout the season. The following season, he signed with the Toronto Olympians of the newly formed Canadian Professional Soccer League.

He assisted the Olympians in achieving an undefeated season, and secured a double by winning the Open Canada Cup. The club lost out in the playoffs to his former club St. Catharines, losing in penalties. In 1999, he returned to the USL A-League to sign with the Atlanta Silverbacks, making 17 appearances and scoring 1 goal. When the USL season concluded he returned to the CPSL to re-sign with the Olympians. He won his second Open Canada Cup with the organization by contributing a goal in a 3-0 victory over Toronto Croatia. Toronto once more went undefeated and clinched a postseason berth, in the playoff finals Handsor scored the winning goal in a 2-0 victory over Toronto Croatia. In 2000, Handsor was relegated to the bench for the majority of the season which led to his transfer to Toronto Croatia. He made his debut on August 18, 2000 against Toronto Olympians. He reached the playoff finals where he would face his former club the Toronto Olympians, where Croatia would win the match by a score of 2-1, marking his second CPSL Championship.

On April 24, 2001 the Vancouver Whitecaps announced the signing of Handsor for the 2001 USL A-League season. Unfortuanelty he wouldn't feature much as he suffered a groin injury keeping him out for most of the season. In 2004, he signed with newly expansion franchise the Edmonton Aviators. Midway through the season he was transferred to the Toronto Lynx, and made his debut on July 25, 2004 in a match against Calgary Mustangs.

== Indoor career ==
Handsor had stints in the National Professional Soccer League, and the Major Indoor Soccer League. He played with Cleveland Crunch, Philadelphia KiXX, Toronto Shooting Stars, Edmonton Drillers, Buffalo Blizzard, Kansas City Comets, Baltimore Blast, Cleveland Force, Chicago Storm, and California Cougars.

== Achievements ==
Toronto Olympians

- CPSL Championship (1): 1999
- Open Canada Cup (2): 1998, 1999
- Canadian Professional Soccer League Regular Season Champions (2): 1998, 1999

Toronto Croatia

- CPSL Championship (1): 2000
