= Czesław Zając (footballer) =

Polish footballer

Personal information
- Date of birth: 12 July 1968 (age 58)
- Place of birth: Duszniki-Zdrój, Poland
- Height: 1.78 m (5 ft 10 in)
- Position: Midfielder

Senior career*
Years	Team	Apps	(Gls)
1992–1993	Pogoń Szczecin	2	(0)
1992–1993	Dąb Dębno		
1996	Oakville Western Canadians		
1997	Toronto Lynx	2	(0)
1997	Toronto Supra	6	(2)
1998–1999	Toronto Croatia	20	(4)
- * Club domestic league appearances and goals

Czesław Zając (born 12 July 1968) is a Polish former professional footballer who played as a midfielder.

== Playing career ==
Zając began his professional career in his native Poland in the Ekstraklasa with Pogoń Szczecin in 1992. After appearing in only 2 matches, he signed with Dąb Dębno, a club which mostly featured in the lower leagues. In 1996, he went abroad to Canada and signed with Oakville Canadian Westerns of the Canadian National Soccer League. He reached the playoffs with Oakville by finishing fourth in the league standings. He featured in the semi-final match against Toronto Italia, but unfortunately were eliminated by the eventual playoff champions by a score of 5–4 goals on aggregate.

In April 1997, he signed with the newly expanded franchise Toronto Lynx of the USL A-League. His signing was announced in a press conference which revealed the team roster. Zajac made his debut for the club on April 12, 1997 in the Lynx's first official match against Jacksonville Cyclones; the game would eventually result in a 3–1 defeat for the fledgling side. Unfortunately, after appearing in only 2 matches, he was released from his contract. For the remainder of the year, he returned to the CNSL and signed with Toronto Supra. Zając made his debut on 13 June 1997 against Toronto Croatia in a 0–0 draw. Supra reached the cup finals, but once more Zając failed to win a piece of silverware after losing 4–3 on goals on aggregate to St. Catharines Wolves.

The following year, he signed with Toronto Croatia of the newly formed Canadian Professional Soccer League. He made his debut on 3 June 1998 in an Open Canada Cup match against Glen Shields in a 3–1 defeat. He would score his first two goals in the next match against London City in a 5–1 victory. In 1999, Zając returned to the Croatian side, but missed the majority of the season due to an injury and managed to return late in the season to help Toronto finish second in the league standings, clinching a postseason berth. In the postseason, he contributed a goal in a 5–2 victory over Glen Shields in the semifinals, and advanced to the playoff finals but were defeated by the Toronto Olympians in a 2–0 loss.

== Personal life ==
His son Marcel Zajac also became a footballer.

His daughter Nicole Zajac also became a footballer.
