= Tony Preci =

Canadian soccer player

Personal information
- Full name: Dritan Preci
- Date of birth: June 11, 1975 (age 51)
- Place of birth: Pristina, SFR Yugoslavia
- Position: Midfielder

Senior career*
Years	Team	Apps	(Gls)
1995	London Croatia		
1996	London City SC		
1997–1998	London Croatia		
1999	Toronto Lynx	4	(0)
2000	Toronto Croatia	12	(0)
- * Club domestic league appearances and goals

Dritan Preci (born 11 June 1975), commonly known as Tony Preci is a Kosovan former footballer who played in the Western Ontario Soccer League, Canadian National Soccer League, USL A-League, and the Canadian Professional Soccer League.

== Club career ==
Preci immigrated to Canada in 1995 and signed with London Croatia in the Western Ontario Soccer League. He also played with London City in the Canadian National Soccer League. In 1999, he signed with Toronto Lynx in the USL A-League, and made his debut on May 2, 1999 against Minnesota Thunder. In total he played in 4 matches for Toronto. The following season he signed with Toronto Croatia of the Canadian Professional Soccer League. He made his debut on June 7, 2000 against North York Astros. In his debut season with Croatia he featured in the CPSL Championship against Toronto Olympians, where they won the title by a score of 2-1.
