= Tony Donia =

Canadian former soccer player

Personal information
- Full name: Tony Donia
- Place of birth: Canada
- Position: Defender

Senior career*
Years	Team	Apps	(Gls)
1998	Toronto Lynx	3	(0)
1998–1999	Glen Shields	24	(1)
- * Club domestic league appearances and goals

Tony Donia is a Canadian former soccer player who played in the USL A-League, and the Canadian Professional Soccer League.

== Playing career ==
Donia played in the USL A-League in 1998 with the Toronto Lynx. The remaining halve of the season he signed with Glen Shields in the Canadian Professional Soccer League, and made his debut on June 3, 1998, against Toronto Croatia. In his debut season he assisted in clinching a postseason berth. He recorded his first goal for the club on June 6, 1999, against London City.
