= Peyvand Mossavat =

Iranian-born Canadian soccer player and coach

Personal information
- Full name: Peyvand Mossavat
- Date of birth: August 17, 1970 (age 56)
- Place of birth: Tehran, Iran
- Height: 5 ft 9 in (1.75 m)
- Position: Centre-back

Senior career*
| Years | Team | Apps | (Gls) |
| 1991 | Kitchener Kickers | 4 | (0) |
| 1992 | London Lasers | 6 | (0) |
| 1992 | Winnipeg Fury | 5 | (0) |
| 1993 | North York Rockets | | (0) |
| 1994–1995 | Toronto Italia | 15 | (0) |
| 1996–1997 | St. Catharines Wolves | 17 | (1) |
| 1997 | Toronto Lynx | 9 | (0) |
| 1998–2000 | Toronto Olympians | 39 | (5) |
| 2001–2002 | Toronto Supra | 35 | (1) |
| 2002 | → Toronto Lynx (loan) | 1 | (0) |
| 2006 | Portuguese Supra | 9 | (0) |
| 2007 | North York Astros | 3 | (0) |

Managerial career
- 2004–2010: Ryerson Rams (women)
- 2011: York Lions (women)
- 2012–: Ontario Tech Ridgebacks (women)
- 2018: DeRo United (women)
- 2021: Unionville Milliken SC
- 2022–: North Mississauga SC
- * Club domestic league appearances and goals as of 2015-01-04

Peyvand Mossavat (born August 17, 1970) is an Iranian-born Canadian former soccer player and coach who played in the Canadian Soccer League. Canadian National Soccer League, National Professional Soccer League, USL A-League, and the Canadian Professional Soccer League.

== Playing career ==
Mossavat began his professional career in 1990 being drafted by the Winnipeg Fury of the Canadian Soccer League. He was traded to Kitchener Kickers in 1990, and was transferred to the North York Rockets in 1992. After the demise of the CSL, North York joined the Canadian National Soccer League in 1993, and won the regular season championship. The following year North York joined the American Professional Soccer League, and as result Mossavat remained in the CNSL signing with league giants Toronto Italia. He made his debut for the club on May 29, 1995 in a match against the Hamilton White Eagles. During the season he was selected to the CNSL all-star squad which faced Parma F.C. on August 13, 1995. Mossavat concluded the season with Italia, who finished third in the standings.

The next year he signed with St. Catharines Wolves, and with them he finished second in the standings, and reached the postseason finals where they were defeated by his former club Toronto Italia. He managed to achieve a Umbro Cup with St. Catharines finishing first in the Cup standings.

Midway through the CNSL 1997 season, Mossavat was signed by the new expansion franchise the Toronto Lynxof the USL A-League. He made his debut for the club on July 27, 1997 in a match against division rivals the Montreal Impact. Mossavat assisted the club in qualifying for the post season for the first time in the franchise's history, by finishing 4th in the Northeastern division. The Lynx were eliminated in the first round of the playoffs against the Montreal Impact. The next year he signed with the Toronto Olympians of the newly formed Canadian Professional Soccer League. Throughout the 1998 CPSL season, he achieved an undefeated streak with the Olympians the first club within the league to achieve this milestone. As well as winning the double by winning the regular season and the Open Canada Cup. The club reached the playoff finals but were defeated by the St. Catharines Wolves by 4-2 victory in a penalty shootout. He re-signed with the Olympians the following season where he contributed in the club's second consecutive undefeated season which allowed them to claim the regular season championship; the first club to reach that milestone in the league's history. Within that year he managed to win a Treble with the club by claiming the Open Canada Cup, CPSL Championship, and the League championship.

During the 2000 season, Mossavat was again instrumental in Toronto's exceptionally successful campaign where he led the Olympians to a 10-game undefeated streak, as well as claiming the Open Canada Cup in the process. The victory in claiming the Open Cup marked the first time in the league's history a club winning the trophy three consecutive years in a row. Though he did manage to lead his team to the playoff finals, they were defeated by Toronto Croatia by a score of 2-1. In 2001, he signed with the Toronto Supra where he reached the postseason by finishing third in the standings. After the 2002 season he retired from professional soccer, but he would eventually return to the Supra (then renamed the Toronto Supra Portuguese) in a match on September 4, 2006 against the Italia Shooters. In 2007, Mossavat signed with the North York Astros making his debut on July 15, 2007 against the Italia Shooters.

== Indoor career ==
Mossavat began his indoor career in 1995 with Canton Invaders in the National Professional Soccer League. The following season he signed with the Toronto Shooting Stars and appeared in 28 matches and recorded two goals. His next stint was in 1997 where he spent time with the Montreal Impact, and Milwaukee Wave.

== Coaching career ==
In 2004, he was appointed the Ryerson Rams women`s head coach, and served for one season as the women`s head coach for York Lions On March 13, 2012 he was appointed the women`s head coach for University of Ontario Institute of Technology Ridgebacks, and took over the UOIT Men's Soccer program in 2016.

== Personal life ==
On 10 January 2026, Mossavat sent an exclusive message to Iran International supporting the 2025–2026 Iranian protests along with several other Iranian coaches across football.

== Honours ==
=== Toronto Olympians ===
- CPSL Championship (1): 1999
- Open Canada Cup (2): 1998, 1999, 2000
- Canadian Professional Soccer League Regular Season Champions (2): 1998, 1999, 2000
