= Bayete Smith =

Canadian former soccer player (born 1972)

Personal information
- Full name: Bayete Smith
- Date of birth: April 11, 1972 (age 54)
- Place of birth: Canada
- Position: Defender

Senior career*
Years	Team	Apps	(Gls)
1995–1996	Caribbean Stars		
1998–2001	Toronto Olympians		
2002	Toronto Lynx	2	(1)
2002–2003	Vaughan Sun Devils		
2004	Brampton Hitmen	20	(4)
- * Club domestic league appearances and goals as of April 18, 2015

Bayete Smith (born April 11, 1972) is a Canadian former soccer player who played in the Canadian Professional Soccer League, and the USL A-League.

== Playing career ==
Smith began playing at the college level with Florida International University, and later with Sheridan College in 2000. In 1995, he played in the Canadian International Soccer League with the Caribbean Stars for two seasons.

In 1998, he played in the Canadian Professional Soccer League with the Toronto Olympians. In his debut season with Toronto he contributed in securing the double by winning the regular season and the League Cup. In his sophomore season he assisted Toronto in securing the CPSL Championship. During the 2000 season, Smith was instrumental in Toronto's successful campaign as they secured their second double (regular season and league cup). For his efforts he was awarded the CPSL Defender of the Year, and was selected for the CPSL All-Star team.

In 2002, he signed with the Toronto Lynx in the USL A-League. He made his debut for the Lynx on May 3, 2002 in a 3-2 loss to the Atlanta Silverbacks. The next day Toronto faced Charlotte Eagles and Smith scored his first goal for the club in a 2-1 defeat. Following his short tenure with the Toronto Lynx he returned to the CPSL to sign with Vaughan Sun Devils. In 2004, he signed with Brampton Hitmen and helped the club reach the postseason by finishing fourth in the Western Conference. In 2008, he played with Markham Soccer Club Lightning, and secured the Ontario Cup master’s title.

== Managerial career ==
In 2001, he served as an assistant coach under Vito Colangelo for Seneca Sting. In 2005, he was the assistant coach for the Seneca Sting men's indoor soccer team. After his retirement from soccer he was employed as an athletic therapist and as a personal trainer.

== Honors ==
=== Toronto Olympians ===
- CPSL Championship (1): 1999
- CPSL League Cup (3): 1998, 1999, 2000
- Canadian Professional Soccer League Regular Season Champions (3): 1998, 1999, 2000
