= Semir Mesanovic =

Bosnian-Canadian former soccer player (born 1981)

Personal information
- Full name: Semir Mesanovic
- Date of birth: January 1, 1981 (age 45)
- Place of birth: SR Bosnia and Herzegovina, SFR Yugoslavia
- Position: Forward

Senior career*
Years	Team	Apps	(Gls)
1999	London City SC	14	(10)
2001–2002	Toronto Croatia	16	(7)
2003	Indiana Blast	11	(3)
2003–2006	Milwaukee Wave (indoor)	34	(11)
2004	Minnesota Thunder	0	(0)
2005–2006	Chicago Storm (indoor)	22	(15)
2006–2007	California Cougars (indoor)	17	(5)
2006–2007	Chicago Storm (indoor)	5	(0)
2007–2008	California Cougars (indoor)	29	(19)
2008–2009	Rockford Rampage (indoor)	18	(6)
2009–2010	Philadelphia KiXX (indoor)	6	(7)
2009–2010	Rockford Rampage (indoor)	16	(10)
2010–2011	Chicago Riot (indoor)	19	(8)
2012–2013	Rockford Rampage (indoor)	13	(19)
2012–2013	Chicago Soul FC (indoor)	7	(2)
2014–2015	Chicago Mustangs (indoor)	4	(1)
2015	RWB Adria	8	(3)
2015–2016	Cedar Rapids Rampage (indoor)	10	(0)
2016	Ontario Fury (indoor)	1	(0)

International career
2003	Canada U-23	1	(0)
- * Club domestic league appearances and goals as of 25 January 2019

Semir Mesanovic (born January 1, 1981) is a former soccer player. Born in Yugoslavia, he represented Canada at international youth level. Mesanovic currently coaches at the Chicago Inter Soccer Club.

== Playing career ==
Mesanovic began his career in 1999 with London City in the Canadian Professional Soccer League. In his debut season he finished as the club's top goalscorer with 10 goals, and clinched a postseason berth. He was also selected for the CPSL All-Star match against a CSA Canada Development Team though he played in the league he was selected for the Canada squad. For his impressive debut season he was recognized by the league with the Rookie of the Year award. He had several trials in Europe before returning to the CPSL to sign with Toronto Croatia in 2001.

In 2003, he signed with the Indiana Blast of the USL A-League, where he appeared in 11 matches and recorded 3 goals. The following season he signed with Minnesota Thunder. In 2015, he played with RWB Adria in the Premier League of America. During the winter seasons he played with several indoor clubs. In his debut season in the Major Indoor Soccer League with Milwaukee Wave he won the MISL Championship in 2003. During his time in the MISL he has played with Chicago Storm, California Cougars, Rockford Rampage, Philadelphia KiXX, Chicago Riot, and Chicago Soul FC. In the Major Arena Soccer League he played with Chicago Mustangs, Cedar Rapids Rampage, and Ontario Fury.

== International career ==
In 2003, he made his first appearance for the Canada U-23 national soccer team against US Virgin Islands.
