= George Azcurra =

Canadian former soccer player

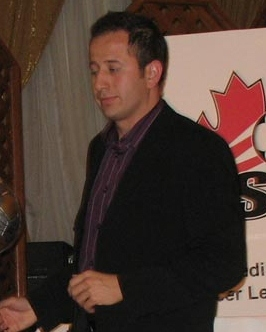
- Azcurra in 2006

Personal information
- Full name: George Azcurra
- Date of birth: 13 March 1974 (age 52)
- Place of birth: Ontario, Canada
- Position: Goalkeeper

Youth career
- 1993: Mercer County Community College
- 1994–1997: Boston University Terriers

Senior career*
Years	Team	Apps	(Gls)
1997–1998	Rhode Island Stingrays	2	(0)
1998–1999	Woodbridge Sora		
1999–2008	Toronto Croatia		
- * Club domestic league appearances and goals as of 10 September 2017

George Azcurra (born March 1, 1974) is a Canadian former soccer player who played in the USISL D-3 Pro League, and the Canadian Professional Soccer League.

== Playing career ==
Azcurra began playing soccer in 1992 at the amateur level with Mississauga United in the Ontario Soccer League. In 1993, he was recruited by Mercer County Community College, where he was named goalie of the year by the National Junior College Athletic Association. He later enrolled with Boston University Terriers in 1994, where he captured two American East Championships. In 1997, he joined the professional ranks by signing with Rhode Island Stingrays in the USISL D-3 Pro League. After two seasons in the United States he returned to the OSL to play with Woodbridge Sora. In 1999, he signed with Toronto Croatia of the Canadian Professional Soccer League. Where in his debut season he was named the CPSL Goalkeeper of the Year.

The following season he contributed by securing the CPSL Championship for Toronto. Throughout his tenure with Toronto he achieved a league record of five Goalkeeper of the Year awards. Other accolades included a total of three CPSL Championships, and a Croatian World Club Championship. He was also named a two time CPSL All-Star. In 2008, he announced his retirement from professional soccer.
