= Gus Kouzmanis =

Canadian former soccer player (born 1975)

Personal information
- Place of birth: East York, Ontario
- Position: Midfielder

Senior career*
Years	Team	Apps	(Gls)
1995–1996	Wichita Wings (indoor)	1	(0)
1996–1997	Toronto Supra		
1996–1997	Toronto Shooting Stars (indoor)	30	(15)
1998–2000	Toronto Olympians	42	(73)
2001–2002	Glen Shields Sun Devils	36	(12)
- * Club domestic league appearances and goals as of 29 April 2015

Gus Kouzmanis (born 1975) is a Canadian former soccer player who played in the National Professional Soccer League, and the Canadian Professional Soccer League.

== Playing career ==
Kouzamanis began his career in the Canadian National Soccer League in 1996 with the Toronto Supra. In his debut season with the Supra he helped the club finish third in both regular and cup standings. In the playoffs the Supra faced St. Catharines Wolves in the semi-finals, but were eliminated by a score 2-1 on goals on aggregate. At the conclusion of the season he was awarded the CNSL Rookie of the Year award. During the winter of 1995, he played with the Wichita Wings of the National Professional Soccer League. He returned to Toronto in 1997, but an injury kept him out the entire outdoor season. During the winter season he signed with the Toronto Shooting Stars, where he appeared in 30 matches and scored 15 goals.

In 1998, he signed with Toronto Olympians of the newly formed Canadian Professional Soccer League. Kouzmanis had a tremendous debut season with the organization he assisted in the club's undefeated season run, and was rewarded with the CSL Golden Boot as finishing as the league's top goalscorer. In the Open Canada Cup final match he scored twice to secure the trophy for Toronto in a 3-0 victory over St. Catharines Wolves. As the Olympians reached the CPSL Championship finals there opponents were once more St. Catharines, but this time history would not repeat itself as the Wolves would go on to win the championship 4-2 on penalties. The following season, he repeated Toronto's undefeated season and achieved a treble - the first CPSL club to record this milestone. He finished third as top goal scorer in the league. In 2000, the Olympians finished once more as regular season, and Open Canada Cup champions, but were defeated by Toronto Croatia in the CPSL Championship final. For the second time in his career he was awarded the CPSL Golden Boot, and thus made history by becoming the only player to have won the award on more than one occasion.

In 2001, Kouzmanis requested his release from Toronto after not being guaranteed a starting position. For the remainder of the season he signed with the Glen Shields Sun Devils and played with the franchise for two seasons. In the 2002 season he played with his brother Tom Kouzmanis.

== Achievements ==
Toronto Olympians

- Rogers Cup (1): 1999
- Open Canada Cup (3): 1998, 1999, 2000
- Canadian Professional Soccer League Regular Season Champions (3): 1998, 1999, 2000
