= Dave Benning =

English footballer (born 1967)

Dave Benning (born 3 November 1967) is an English former footballer, head coach, and Technical Programs Manager for the Canadian Soccer Association.

Benning worked in the Canadian Professional Soccer League with Vaughan Shooters as a player and manager from 1998 to 2003. He was active as a player in 1998 in the club's inaugural season in the CPSL. In their debut season he helped secure a postseason berth by finishing third in the overall standings. He featured in the playoffs against St. Catharines Wolves, but were eliminated by a score of 5–2 on goals on aggregate. The following season, he was appointed assistant coach of the Glen Shields Soccer Club in the club's first season in 1998. In 1999, he succeeded coach Ron Harrison and continued as head coach until he retired in 2003. On 28 November 2003, he was appointed Technical Programs Manager by the Canadian Soccer Association .
