= Dufferin District Field =

- Full name: Dufferin District
- Location: Thornhill, Ontario, Canada
- Owner: Ontario Soccer Association
- Capacity: 550+
- Surface: Grass

Construction
- Groundbreaking: 1995
- Built: 1996
- Opened: 1998
- Closed: 2005
- Demolished: 2008

Tenant
- Vaughan Shooters (CPSL) (1998-2004)

Dufferin District Field was a Canadian exposition soccer facility. It was located in Thornhill, Ontario, Canada.

Dufferin District Field broke ground in 1995, was built 1996, and opened in 1998. The field was built for the Canadian Professional Soccer League team, Glen Shields. The team became the Glen Shields Sun Devils in 1999, then changed their name to the Vaughan Sun Devils in 2002, and then again in 2003 to the Vaughan Shooters. The field closed in 2005 after the Shooters transferred to the St. Joan of Arc Turf Field in Maple, Ontario, 20 km north-west of downtown Toronto. The field was demolished in 2008.

== See also ==
- Vaughan Shooters
- Ontario Soccer Association
