= Toronto Shooting Stars =

- Full name: Toronto Shooting Stars
- Founded: 1996 (Francois Glasman)
- Dissolved: 1997
- Stadium: Maple Leaf Gardens
- Capacity: 15,726
- League: NPSL

Toronto Shooting Stars were an indoor soccer team based in Toronto, Ontario that competed in the defunct NPSL. The team began play in the 1996–1997 season, with home games taking place at Maple Leaf Gardens. However, the ownership of the franchise collapsed just 3 games into its first season, forcing the league to take control of the team's operations for the remainder of the season. After losses of nearly $1 million, the team suspended operations for the 1997–1998 season. It was reported that the owner of the Toronto Maple Leafs held negotiations to purchase the team, but it never returned to play.

== Year-by-year record ==
Year	League	Reg. season	GF	GA	Pct	Finish	Playoffs	Avg. attendance
1996-97	NPSL	6-34	416	685	.150	4th North	Out of playoffs	3,008
