= Eddy Berdusco =

Canadian soccer player (born 1969)

Personal information
- Full name: Eddy Berdusco
- Date of birth: 8 September 1969 (age 57)
- Place of birth: Mississauga, Ontario, Canada
- Height: 6 ft 0 in (1.83 m)
- Position: Striker

Senior career*
Years	Team	Apps	(Gls)
1988–1992	North York Rockets	111	(54)
1993	Toronto Blizzard	11	(5)
1994	Toronto Rockets	2	(2)
1993–1994	FC Wil	?	(8)
1994	VfB Mödling	3	(1)
1995	Foshan		
1996	Montreal Impact	29	(9)
1997	Milwaukee Rampage	10	(4)
1998–2001	Toronto Olympians	61	(67)
2002	Toronto Supra	3	(0)

International career^{‡}
1988	Canada U-20	5	(2)
1992	Canada U-23	4	(1)
1992–1997	Canada	18	(4)
- * Club domestic league appearances and goals as of 14 May 2008 ‡ National team caps and goals as of 14 May 2008

Eddy Berdusco (born 8 September 1969) is a Canadian retired professional soccer player. A former forward, he began his career in the Canadian Soccer League, where he finished as the third all-time highest goalscorer. After the demise of the CSL he spent some time abroad in Europe, China, before returning to North America to play with the Milwaukee Rampage. Berdusco would spend the remainder of his career in the Canadian Professional Soccer League, winning several team championships with the Toronto Olympians, and retiring with the Toronto Supra in 2002.

Berdusco also played internationally for Canada and scored one of its most memorable goals in a friendly against Brazil in 1994.

== Club career ==
The son of Italian immigrants, Berdusco was the original Canadian Soccer League's 3rd all-time highest goal scorer with 54 from 1988 through 1992 as a member of North York Rockets. In 1988, he was the league's 5th leading scorer with 11 goals, in 1990 the 6th leading scorer with 9 goals, in 1991 the league's 2nd leading scorer with 14 goals, and in the league's final season he led in scoring with 14 goals. After the folding of the CSL he signed with the Toronto Blizzard of the American Professional Soccer League in 1993. He made his debut for the club on 23 May 1993 in a match against the Tampa Bay Rowdies. After the Blizzard failed to reach the postseason, he went abroad to Europe to sign with FC Wil in Switzerland, and had a short spell in Austria, playing three matches in November 1994 for VfB Mödling. After his tenure in Europe he came to a conclusion to go to China to play in the Jia League with now defunct Foshan Fosti F.C. (along with fellow Canadian international Ian Carter) in 1994.

In the summer of the 1994 Berdusco returned to the APSL to sign with the Toronto Rockets. He made his debut for the organization on 9 September 1994 in a match against the Colorado Foxes, and managed to score a goal in his debut match. In 1996, he signed with the Montreal Impact, and finished the A-League as the sixth leading scorer with 19 points (on 8 goals and 3 assists), and managed to win the regular season championship In the winter of 1996 he played indoor with the Toronto Shooting Stars of the National Professional Soccer League. The following season, he signed with the Milwaukee Rampage for the 1997 season where unfortunately the organization failed to obtain him a valid work permit which resulted in five-year ban from entering the United States.

In 1998, Berdusco signed with the Toronto Olympians in the newly formed Canadian Professional Soccer League. In his debut season in the CPSL he helped the Olympians achieve an undefeated season, and claim the CPSL League Cup. In the finals against the St. Catharines Wolves he scored a goal in a 3–0 victory. He assisted in the Olympians reaching the playoff finals where the team suffered an upset loss to St. Catharines in a 4–2 loss on a penalty shootout. The following season, he repeated Toronto's undefeated season and achieved a treble – the first CPSL club to record this milestone. At the end of the season he was awarded the CPSL Golden Boot for finishing as the league's top goalscorer. In 2000, the Olympians defended their regular-season championship, and League Cup, but were defeated by Toronto Croatia in the CPSL Championship final. For the 2001 season he featured less throughout the year due to injuries, and the club failed to secure any piece of silverware.

On 7 May 2002, Toronto Supra announced the signing of Berdusco for the 2002 season. Due to injuries, suspensions, and family responsibilities, Berdusco made only occasional appearances for the club and retired at the conclusion of the season.

== International career ==
He made his debut for Canada in a June 1992 Columbus 500 Cup match against Hong Kong in which he immediately scored his first international goal. He went on to earn a total of 18 caps, scoring 4 goals. He represented Canada in only 2 FIFA World Cup qualification matches. He also played at the inaugural 1989 FIFA Futsal World Championship.

Berdusco is famous in Canada for being the player who scored the equalizer against mighty Brazil to secure the Canadians a 1–1 draw in a 1994 World Cup tune-up match played at Commonwealth Stadium. A month later, Brazil became World Champions.

His final international was a November 1997 World Cup qualification match against Costa Rica, a game after which also Alex Bunbury, Frank Yallop, Paul Dolan, Geoff Aunger and Colin Miller all said farewell to the national team.

=== International goals ===
Scores and results list Canada's goal tally first.

#	Date	Venue	Opponent	Score	Result	Competition
1	13 June 1992	Varsity Stadium, Toronto, Canada	Hong Kong	3–0	3–1	Columbus 500 Cup
2	11 March 1993	Royal Athletic Park, Victoria, Canada	South Korea	2–0	2–0	Friendly match
3	5 June 1994	Commonwealth Stadium, Edmonton, Canada	Brazil	1–1	1–1	Friendly match
4	1 June 1997	Commonwealth Stadium, Edmonton, Canada	Costa Rica	1–0	1–0	1998 FIFA World Cup qualification

== Honours ==
=== Club ===
Toronto Olympians

- CPSL Championship (1) 1999
- Open Canada Cup (3): 1998, 1999, 2000
- Canadian Professional Soccer League Regular Season Champions (3): 1998, 1999, 2000

=== Individual ===
- CSL Golden Boot (1): 1999
