= German Canadian Club of London Field =

Multi-purpose stadium in London, Ontario

- Interactive map of German Canadian Club of London Field
- Location: London, Ontario, Canada
- Coordinates: 42.970774°N 81.266595°W
- Owner: German Canadian Club
- Operator: German Canadian FC
- Capacity: 1,000
- Field size: 105 by 65 metres (115 yd × 71 yd)

Construction
- Opened: 1952

Tenant
- German Canadian FC

German Canadian Club of London Field is a multi-purpose stadium in London, Ontario, Canada. It is currently used mostly for football matches and is the home ground of German Canadian FC. It was the previous home of Ontario Premier League club FC London until 2021, when the club moved to Tricar Field. The stadium holds 1,000 spectators. The stadium field meets all FIFA standards and is comparable to size of most fields in the German Bundesliga. The stadium has a daily maintenance program, change rooms, food and beverage services, and a large licensed patio.

The soccer facility can also accommodate 4v4, 7v7, and 9v9 youth soccer pitches.
