= Durham Storm =

Former Canadian soccer team

- Full name: Durham Storm Soccer Club
- Nicknames: The Storm, Durham's Own
- Founded: 1998; 28 years ago (as Toronto Olympians)
- Dissolved: 2005; 21 years ago
- Stadium: Oshawa Civic Stadium, Oshawa, Ontario
- Capacity: 5,000
- Chairman: John O'Neill
- Manager: Rob Shaufler
- Coach: Doug Paterson
- League: CPSL
Home colours	Away colours	Third colours

The Durham Storm were a Canadian soccer team that last played in the Canadian Professional Soccer League (CPSL) in 2005. The club was founded as the Toronto Olympians in 1998 and played in Toronto, Ontario through 2001, before being renamed the Mississauga Olympians for 2002 and 2003. The team relocated to Oshawa, Ontario in Durham Region for the 2004 and 2005 seasons and was renamed Durham Storm.

The team won three consecutive regular season championships from 1998 to 2000 and won the league playoffs, earning the CPSL Championship once in 1999. They also finished as regular season runners-up in 2001, and were two-time Rogers Cup finalists in 1998 and 2000.

Despite the early success, the team's performance went downhill from 2002 onward, and the franchise eventually folded after the 2005 season.

== History ==
=== Founding CPSL member (1998) ===
In 1998, the Canadian Professional Soccer League was formed as a result of a merger between the Canadian National Soccer League and the stillborn Ontario Professional Soccer League with the Toronto Olympians entering the league as a new franchise. The Olympians were owned by Tom Michalopoulos, which as a result allowed the club to receive sponsorship money from Coffee Time which Michalopoulos founded. The organization brought in former Toronto Lynx general manager and assistant coach David Gee to coach the newly franchise. Gee's roster consist of a mixture of CNSL alumni and players with USL A-League experience. He brought in the likes of Eddy Berdusco, Dino Lopez, Loukas Papaconstantinou – former Lynx players Gong Lei, Ian Carter, Peyvand Mossavat, and the Toronto Supra's 1997 championship finalist squad players Paul Moore, Chris Handsor, and Gus Kouzmanis. The newly formed club received territorial rights in Scarborough and would call Birchmount stadium their home venue.

=== League dominance (1998–01) ===
In their debut season in the nascent league the Scarborough side dominated the season going undefeated and posting the best goal scoring record and as well the fewest goals conceded. Kouzmanis, Berdusco, and Gong Lei each finished as the top three goalscorers for the season. Their undefeated season resulted in a double which included the regular season championship and the Open Canada Cup. The Open Canada Cup finals was played out in a two-game final which involved the Olympians and the St. Catharines Wolves. The first match resulted in a goalless draw, while the second match ended in a 3–0 victory for Toronto. In the postseason the Olympians faced the North York Astros in the semi-finals which concluded in a 5–1 victory for Toronto with goals coming from Daryl Holmes, Berdusco, John Matas, and Kouzmanis. The finals consist of battle between the first and second place teams St. Catharines and Toronto – the match finished as a 2–2 draw which led to penalties where the Wolves denied the Olympians the chance of a treble by winning the game 4–2 in a penalty shootout.

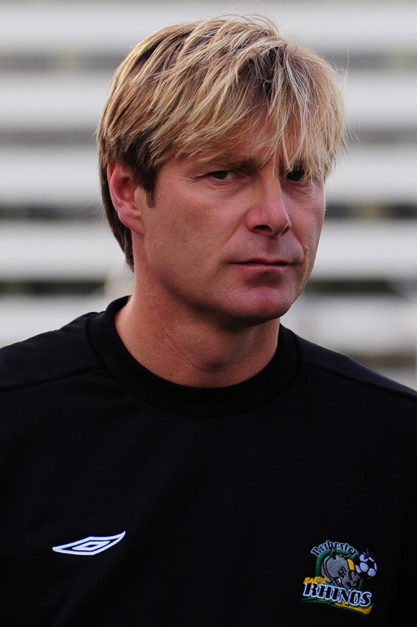
Darren Tilley played and retired with Mississauga Olympians, and received the CPSL Golden Boot and Rookie of the Year award during his tenure with the club.

At the conclusion of the season Gus Kouzmanis was awarded the CSL Golden Boot and David Gee received the Coach of the Year at the CPSL Awards Banquet. For the 1999 season Gee signed Canadian international Elvis Thomas and Phil Caporella from the Montreal Impact. The 1999 season was a repeat of the previous year with Toronto recapturing the regular season championship once more while making history by becoming the first club in the CPSL to go undefeated two consecutive seasons. Four of Toronto's players led the scoring charts with Berdusco leading while Kouzmanis, Thomas, and Matas taking the rest of the top four positions. The club finished once more with the best offensive and defensive record in the league. The Olympians defended their Open Canada Cup title successfully by defeating Toronto Croatia by a score of 3–0. They would face Toronto Croatia again this time in the playoff final where the Olympians would mark another milestone in CPSL history by becoming the first club to win a treble within the league. The match resulted in a 2–0 victory with goals from Thomas and Handsor, the attainment established the Scarborough side as a powerhouse within the league. At the CPSL Awards Banquet the Toronto Olympians received four awards – the organization received the Fair Play Award, David Gee for a consecutive year received the Coach of the Year, Elvis Thomas received the Canadian Soccer League MVP Award and Eddy Berdusco won the CPSL Golden Boot. While Elvis Thomas made history by holding the distinction of being first CPSL player to be called up for the Canadian national soccer team, while playing in the league.

Original Toronto Olympians logo

The 2000 season marked more achievements for the club by successfully defending their three consecutive regular season titles, and still maintaining the best offensive and defensive record. The Olympians would win the double once more by successfully defending the Open Canada Cup for the third consecutive season. In the finals Toronto would face St. Catharines and win the match by a score of 1–0, thus establishing a dynasty for the club. For the postseason Gee strengthen his squad with players like Darren Tilley, and Trinidad and Tobago internationals Densill Theobald and Rick Titus. In the semi-finals the team faced the Glen Shields Sun Devils and won the match 1–0 with a goal coming from Titus. The final was contested between Toronto Olympians and Toronto Croatia, where Croatia upset the Olympians by a score of 2–1. For their efforts Kouzmanis was awarded the Golden Boot for the second time in his career, Bayete Smith was given the Defender of the Year and the team was awarded the Fair Play Award. On June 20, 2001, it was reported that head coach David Gee purchased the club from Coffee Time Donuts meanwhile retaining his position as head coach and general manager. He announced plans to move the franchise to Mississauga after struggling to gain revenue from ticket sales. Throughout the season the Olympians failed to recapture any of the major trophies finishing second behind the Ottawa Wizards in the standings. In the postseason Toronto was eliminated in the semi-finals by Toronto Supra by a score 3–2. They featured in a Consolation Final match against Ottawa and won the match 5–2.

=== Relocation and Durham Storm (2002–05) ===
In 2002, the move to Mississauga was completed and their home venue was relocated to Erin Mills Twin Arenas. Gee made several major changes to the roster replacing the majority of veterans with younger athletes. He would retain the likes of Darren Tilley, Paul Moore and Daryl Holmes, while signing promising players like Marko Bendenikovic, Kevin De Surpa, Aaron Benjamin, and Joevannie Peart. The majority of the season was spent battling for the Western Conference title between Toronto Croatia. Mississauga would receive reinforcements during the later half of the season in player loans from the Toronto Lynx – receiving Barbados international Ryan Lucas, David Diplacido, Adrian Serioux, Shawn Faria, Brian Ashton, and signing Trinidad and Tobago international Hayden Fitzwilliams. The Olympians would eventually finish second in the standings and qualified for a playoff berth. Their postseason came to a quick conclusion by being defeated by the North York Astros by a score of 3–0. At the CPSL Awards Banquet the club received the Fair Play Award, while Darren Tilley was awarded the Golden Boot and the CPSL Rookie of the Year.

The 2003 season brought further troubles for the organization as the club was forced to play all their home matches on the road. As the City of Mississauga prevented the team from using the change rooms at Erin Mills Twin Arenas due to renovations. New additions were added to the club as Gee resigned from his position as head coach and transferred the responsibilities to Darren Tilley and CPSL's 1999 Coach of the Year Tony Laferrara. The Olympians struggled on the field as they finished second last in the Western Conference failing to secure a postseason berth. The club was also eliminated from the Open Canada Cup tournament after losing 2–1 to AEK London, an amateur team; the season would mark an end of era as their status as a powerhouse within the league.

For 2004, the club was sold and relocated to the east end of the Greater Toronto Area, moving to Oshawa, Ontario to play out of the Oshawa Civic Stadium. The club would be re-branded again, taking their name from Durham Region (of which Oshawa is a part), to become Durham Storm. In their first season in Durham, the club would finish last in the Eastern Conference with a record of 2 wins, 1 draw and 17 losses. Followed by a disappointing season in 2005 finishing last place (6th) in the Eastern Conference, with a record of 1 win, 1 draw and 20 losses. On December 12, 2005, the club had its franchise revoked by the CPSL.

== Head coaches ==
Years	Name	Nation
1998–2002	David Gee (soccer)	England
2003	Darren Tilley and Tony Laferrara	England Canada
2004	Derek Bean	Canada
2005	Doug Paterson	Canada

== Achievements ==
- CPSL Championship (1): 1999
- Open Canada Cup (3): 1998, 1999, 2000
- Canadian Professional Soccer League Regular Season Champions (3): 1998, 1999, 2000

== Year-by-year ==
Year	League	Regular season	Playoffs	Notes
1998	CPSL	1st, Eastern	Runner-up	As Toronto Olympians.
1999	CPSL	1st, Eastern	Champions	
2000	CPSL	1st, Eastern	Runner-up	
2001	CPSL	2nd, Eastern	Semi Final	
2002	CPSL	2nd, Western	Semi Final	As Mississauga Olympians.
2003	CPSL	6th, Western	Did not qualify	
2004	CPSL	6th, Eastern	Did not qualify	As Durham Storm.
2005	CPSL	6th, Eastern	Did not qualify	

== Notable players ==
Canada

- Brian Ashton (2002)
- Marko Bedenikovic (2002–03)
- Aaron Benjamin (2002)
- Eddy Berdusco (1998-2001)
- Salvatore Borgh (2003)
- Shayne Campbell (2003)
- Phil Caporella (1999–00)
- Ian Carter (1998)
- Kevin De Serpa (2002)
- David Diplacido (2002)
- Shawn Faria (2002)
- Stevie Gill (2000)
- Willy Giummarra (2001)
- Chris Handsor (1998-99)
- Danley Johnson (2001)
- Gus Kouzmanis (1998-01)
- Tom Kouzmanis (2000-01)
- Jimmy Kuzmanovski (2002-03)
- Dino Lopez (1998)
- Paul Moore (1998), (2001-03)
- Peyvand Mossavat (1998-00)
- Andrew Ornoch (2002)
- Lucas Papaconstantinou (1998)
- Joevannie Peart (2002)
- Adrian Serioux (2002)
- Bayete Smith (1998-01)
- Elvis Thomas (1999-00)

Barbados

- Ryan Lucas (2002)

China

- Gong Lei (1998)

England

- Darren Tilley (2002-03)

New Zealand

- Daryl Holmes (1998-02)

Saint Vincent and the Grenadines

- Caswain Mason (2000)

Trinidad and Tobago

- Hayden Fitzwilliams (2002)
- Densill Theobald (2000)
- Rick Titus (2000)
