= Glen Shields Sun Devils =

Canadian soccer team

- Founded: 1982 (as Glen Shields S.C.)
- Dissolved: 2003 (merged into York Region Shooters)
- Stadium: Dufferin District Field, Thornhill, Ontario, Canada
- Capacity: 550+
- League: Canadian Professional Soccer League

The Glen Shields Sun Devils were a soccer team which played in the Canadian Professional Soccer League from 1998 to 2002. They played their home matches in Thornhill, Ontario. The franchise was one of the original teams of the CPSL. Originally founded as a youth soccer club, the youth club still continues to operate, now known as Glen Shields FC.

The team was founded in 1982 and was originally known as Glen Shields Soccer Club. During its five-year stint in the CPSL the club qualified for the playoffs three times and reached the semi-finals each occasion. After the 2002 season, Glen Shields (then known as Vaughan Sun Devils) merged with the original York Region Shooters to form a new team, also named the York Region Shooters.

== History ==
The club as Glen Shields S.C. was formed in 1982 and participated in amateur leagues throughout the communities of Thornhill, Ontario, and Concord, Ontario. Glen Shields saw the fruits of their labor come to fruition as they would claim two Ontario Cups, an Ontario Indoor Cup, and three Robbie Championships. In 1998, Glen Shields made the transition to the professional level by becoming a founding member in the newly formed Canadian Professional Soccer League. The team received territorial rights to Thornhill, Vaughan and secured a home venue at Dufferin District Field. The head coach responsibilities was granted to Ron Harrison, who signed several up and coming players like Phil Ionadi, Chris Williams, Irvin Studin, and Paul Moore.

Glen Shields made their professional debut in a Canada Cup match against Toronto Croatia, and recorded a 3–1 victory with goals coming from Bodo Lazetic, Danny Sankar, and Michele D'Angelo. The club's debut season came with a degree of success as the team secured a postseason berth by finishing third in the standings, and posted the third best defensive record. In the preliminary round of the Canada cup tournament Glen Shields finished first in their group rankings, and advanced to the semifinals. Their opponents were the St. Catharines Wolves, and were eliminated 6–1 on goals on aggregate. Their encounter with St. Catharines continued in the first round of the postseason. In the first match the Thornhill club managed a 2–1 victory with the Wolves providing the first goal from an own goal to Peter Firebrace scoring the second. The second match proved futile for Glen Shields as they suffered a 4–0 loss to be eliminated from the competition by 5–2 on goals on aggregate.

The following season saw about a name change to the Glen Shields Sun Devils with Dave Benning as the new head coach. The Sun Devils improved upon their debut season by once more finishing third in the standings, and recording the second best offensive and defensive league statistic. Their playoff run was short lived as they were eliminated 5–2 in the first round by Toronto Croatia. The next three seasons saw a decline in the club's performance as the Sun Devils finished fourth to secure the final playoff berth by two points. The opposite was true in the Canada Cup tournament where the Vaughan club reached the semifinals to repeat history as they faced St. Catharines to lose 3–1. In the postseason Glen Shields faced London City in a wildcard match, and advanced to the next round by defeating London 4–3 in a penalty shootout. The Sun Devils faced the regular season champions Toronto Olympians, but suffered a 1–0 defeat.

In preparations for the 2001 season the organization acquired former CPSL Golden Boot winner Gus Kouzmanis along with promising rookies Nikola Budalić, and Matthew O' Connor. The season marked the first time in the club's history to fail to secure a postseason berth by finishing seventh in the standings with 11 points shy of the final berth. In 2002 the league decided to divide the teams into two Conferences with the Sun Devils being transferred to the Eastern Conference. The season also witnessed another name change, this time to the Vaughan Sun Devils. New additions to the club were Canadian international Tom Kouzmanis, Bayete Smith, Damien Pottinger, Jonathan Westmaas, and Willy Giummarra. Despite the increase in talent Vaughan struggled to achieve sufficient results in order to claim a playoff berth as a result for the second straight year failed to reach the postseason.

== Head coaches ==
Years	Name	Nation
1998–1999	Ron Harrison	Canada
1999–2002	Dave Benning	England

== Year-by-year ==
Year	Team name	League	Regular season	Playoffs
1998	Glen Shields	CPSL	3rd	Semi-finals
1999	Glen Shields Sun Devils	CPSL	3rd	Semi-finals
2000	Glen Shields Sun Devils	CPSL	4th	Semi-finals
2001	Glen Shields Sun Devils	CPSL	7th	Did not qualify
2002	Vaughan Sun Devils	CPSL	6th, Eastern	Did not qualify

== Notable players ==
- Marco Antonucci (1998–02)
- Niki Budalić (2001)
- Tony Donia (1998–99)
- Willy Giummarra (2002)
- Phil Ionadi (1998)
- Robert Irvine (1999)
- Tom Kouzmanis (2002)
- Paul Moore (1998–99)
- Matthew O'Connor (2001)
- Damien Pottinger (2002)
- Bayete Smith (2002)
- Irvin Studin (1998)
- Pat Sullivan (1999)
- Chris Williams (1998–02)
- Jonathan Westmaas (2002)
