= Open Canada Cup =

- Founded: 1998
- Abolished: 2008
- Region: Canada
- Most championships: Toronto Olympians (3 titles)

The Open Canada Cup was an annual knock-out cup competition in Canadian Soccer. The competition was first held during the 1998 season as the CPSL League Cup. It was organized by the Canadian Soccer League (formerly the Canadian Professional Soccer League) originally as a league cup for CSL member clubs. After operating the competition for several seasons as an exclusive tournament, the league's ownership decided in 2003 to grant access to all Canadian professional and amateur clubs. The decision was influenced by the lack of initiative by the Canadian Soccer Association in providing a potential candidate for the CONCACAF Champions' Cup.

Further reforms consisted of title sponsorship with the Government of Canada and the inclusion of a financial reward for the overall champion. Subsequently, the tournament attracted several notable amateurs and professional clubs with credentials from the USL First Division, Canadian National Challenge Cup, Ligue de Soccer Elite Quebec, and the Ontario Cup. In 2007, the competition reached its zenith as it expanded westward to include clubs from British Columbia with the inclusion of the champion of the British Columbia Provincial Soccer Championship. In 2008, the prize money was increased, but after the creation of the Canadian Championship, the competition was disbanded. Since the establishment of the Canadian Championship, CSL teams have not participated in the tournament that determines the Canadian entry into the CONCACAF Champions League.

Canadian Soccer League teams dominated the competition throughout its history; the only non-CSL champion was Ottawa St. Anthony Italia in 2006. Toronto Olympians were the most successful club, winning three titles. David Gee is the most successful head coach in the history of the competition, having won three titles as head coach of the Toronto Olympians.

== Competition format ==
Originally, the format of the competition was organized into a group stage with the two top teams advancing to the semifinals and a final match to decide the champion in September. The arrangement of teams for the group stages was determined by the geographical locations of the clubs to accommodate the travel distances. In 2002, the format was revised with the introduction of a qualifying round with a home and away two-game series, followed by a quarterfinal, semifinal, and championship final round. While the hosting club was granted a wildcard privilege. When the tournament transitioned into an open cup competition, the first round consisted of amateur league clubs. CSL and later USL clubs entered play in the second round.

When the competition expanded westward, British Columbia teams held separate qualifying matches through the British Columbia Provincial Soccer Championship, where the champion received a bye into the semifinals. Traditionally, the schedule of the tournament revolved around the summer holiday long weekends. The opening round was played around Victoria Day, the second round during Canada Day, the quarterfinals on Civic Holiday weekend, and the tournament would conclude during the Labour Day long weekend. The matches were generally decided on a one-legged tie that lasted 90 minutes plus any additional stoppage time. Drawn matches went directly to extra time, and if necessary, they went to a penalty shootout.

== History ==
Historically, attempts at organizing a national open cup competition between professional and amateur clubs in Canadian soccer were a concept largely ignored by the national and provincial associations. One such exception is the Challenge Trophy, which continuously operates at a national level but solely for amateur clubs. A tournament was formed by the CSL's predecessor league, the National Soccer League (NSL), in the 1986 season, known as the NSL Canada Cup, which crowned a national league cup champion with the Pacific Rim Soccer League of British Columbia and the Quebec National Soccer League as participants. The NSL also promoted the NSL Canadian Championship to provide a national champion and a Canadian representative to the CONCACAF Champions' Cup. Proposals were suggested in 1996 by the USL A-League by presenting a trophy to its Canadian franchises to establish a Canadian open cup competition, but the idea failed to materialize.

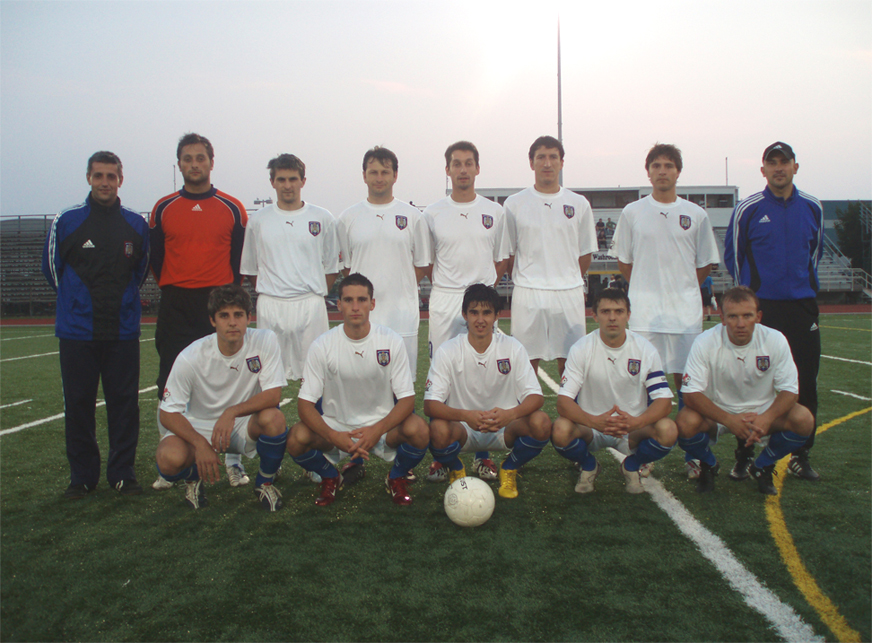
Serbian White Eagles prior to a 2007 Open Canada Cup match

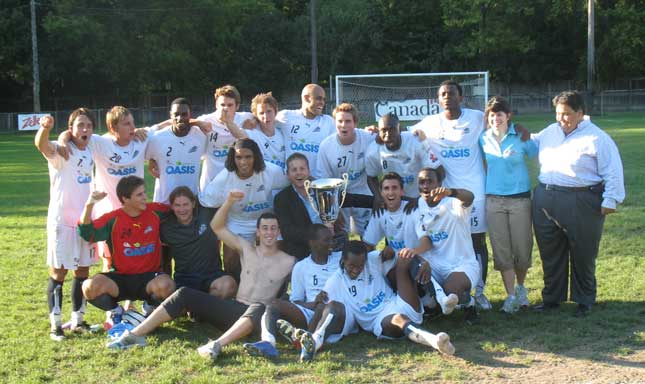
Trois Rivieres Attak celebrating their 2007 Open Canada Cup

In 1998, the Canadian National Soccer League and the Ontario Soccer Association collaborated to form the Canadian Professional Soccer League (CPSL), an attempt to form a national league. Initially, the CPSL ran a league cup known as the CPSL League Cup, but it was restricted to member clubs. Shortly after, the tournament attracted sponsorship deals from Primus Canada, and in 2001 received a title sponsor from Oz Optics Ltd. In the initial years, the league cup was dominated by the Toronto Olympians, which was later assumed by the heavily invested Ottawa Wizards.

In 2002, the competition received financial aid from the Canadian government in the form of a federal grant to promote the tournament across the country. As a result, the league began to take the initiative in providing a potential candidate for the CONCACAF Champions' Cup, as the Canadian Soccer Association and other provincial governing bodies had neglected to organize an open cup tournament. The previous time a Canadian club competed in the Champions' Cup was in the 1976 CONCACAF Champions' Cup, represented by Toronto Italia of the National Soccer League. In 2003, the CPSL opened its league cup to all Canadian professional and amateur clubs with the intent of providing a potential Canadian candidate to the continental tournament. The competition was renamed the Open Canada Cup with the government of Canada as the initial title sponsor, and the inclusion of a $10,000 reward for the champion.

As the restrictions on eligibility were lifted for the 2003 Open Canada Cup, the tournament managed to entice clubs from the Ontario Soccer League, Ottawa Carleton Soccer League, Western Ontario Soccer League, and the Ligue de Soccer Elite Quebec to participate. The competition was won by London City in a penalty shootout against the Metro Lions, played at the Cove Road Stadium, London, Ontario. Despite the CPSL's successful attempt at organizing an open cup tournament, the competition was not without controversy. The controversy stemmed from a dispute involving the Ottawa Wizards and the CPSL's board of directors over the hosting rights for the finals. After failing to confirm their participation in the later rounds of the tournament, the league removed Ottawa from the competition, and in return, Ottawa threatened to obtain an injunction. The dispute eventually reached the Superior Court of Justice, which ruled in favour of the CPSL decision and allowed the tournament to proceed without the participation of Ottawa.

The tournament continued to expand, and in 2004 attracted a record number of 24 participants throughout Ontario. It would grow to include clubs with Challenge Cup and Ontario Cup honors. Meanwhile, the on-field performance was dominated by the Windsor Border Stars with consecutive championships from 2004 to 2005. In 2006, the competition reached a new milestone as it managed to draw the attention of the Toronto Lynx of the USL First Division, the country's top-tier league. The 2006 edition made headlines as Ottawa St. Anthony Italia became the first amateur club to claim the championship after defeating the Toronto Lynx in the finals. The tournament reached its apex in 2007 as it broadened to include professional and amateur teams from British Columbia, Ontario, and Quebec. Trois-Rivières Attak became the first Quebec champion in 2007 after defeating Columbus Clan F.C.

In 2008, the CSL increased the prize money to $25,000, with the top amateur club receiving $10,000, but shortly after the creation of the Canadian Championship, the competition was disbanded.

== Finals ==
Season	Final	Winner	Result	Runner-up	Location
CPSL League Cup
1998	September 27	Toronto Olympians	3–0	St. Catharines Roma Wolves	Toronto, Ontario
1999	September 26	Toronto Olympians	3–0	Toronto Croatia	Toronto, Ontario
2000	September 24	Toronto Olympians	1–0	St. Catharines Roma Wolves	Toronto, Ontario
2001	September 30	Ottawa Wizards	1–0	Toronto Supra	Ottawa, Ontario
2002	September 29	Ottawa Wizards	1–0	Toronto Croatia	London, Ontario
Open Canada Cup
2003	September 1	London City	1–1 (4–2 p)	Metro Lions	London, Ontario
2004	September 6	Windsor Border Stars	1–1 (4–3 p)	Ottawa St. Anthony Italia	London, Ontario
2005	September 5	Windsor Border Stars	3–0	London City	London, Ontario
2006	September 24	Ottawa St. Anthony Italia	2–0	Toronto Lynx	Toronto, Ontario
2007	September 3	Trois-Rivières Attak	3–0	Columbus Clan F.C.	London, Ontario

== Performance by Club ==
Club	Winners	Runner-up	Winning years
Toronto Olympians	3	-	1998, 1999, 2000
Ottawa Wizards	2	-	2001, 2002
Windsor Border Stars	2	-	2004, 2005
London City	1	1	2003
Ottawa St. Anthony Italia	1	1	2006
Trois-Rivières Attak	1	-	2007
St. Catharines Wolves	-	2	-
Toronto Croatia	-	2	-
Toronto Supra	-	1	-
Metro Lions	-	1	-
Toronto Lynx	-	1	-
Columbus Clan FC	-	1	-

== See also ==
- Canadian Championship
- Canada Cup (soccer)
