= Ontario Soccer Association =

Sport organization in Canada

Ontario Soccer
- Founded: 1901; 125 years ago
- Headquarters: Vaughan, Ontario, Canada
- National affiliation: Canadian Soccer Association
- President: Alan O'Brien
- Website: ontariosoccer.net

Ontario Soccer is a Canadian soccer organization. Established in 1901, Ontario Soccer is one of the oldest sports organizations in Canada. Ontario Soccer is composed of over 350,000 players, as well as coaches, referees, and administrators.

Situated at Zanchin Automotive Soccer Centre in Vaughan, Ontario Soccer functions through its 18 member district associations. District association membership includes over 500 youth clubs and senior clubs across Ontario.
