= 1972 National Soccer League season =

National Soccer League
- Season: 1972
- Champions: Toronto Croatia (regular season, 3rd title); Toronto Italia (playoffs, 4th title)
- League cup: Toronto Croatia
- Top goalscorer: Saban Romanovic (23)
- Best goalkeeper: Željko Bilecki

The 1972 National Soccer League season was the forty-ninth season under the National Soccer League (NSL) name. The season began in late April and concluded in October with the Canadian Open Cup final. Toronto Croatia successfully defended its regular-season title for the third consecutive season with an undefeated regular-season streak. Toronto would also defeat the Serbian White Eagles for the NSL Cup. The Croatians would secure a treble by winning the Open Canada Cup against Vancouver Columbus. In the playoffs, Toronto Italia defeated the Serbian White Eagles for the NSL Championship.

== Overview ==
The ownership of the National Soccer League (NSL) was in discussions with the British Columbia Premier League to form a western division, but the project failed to materialize. The membership in the NSL increased to 15 clubs with the return of Toronto Italia and the acceptance of the Hamilton Italo-Canadians, which competed in the Inter-City Soccer League. The return of Toronto Italia further intensified the rivalry between the NSL and the Toronto Metros of the North American Soccer League, as the Italian diaspora played a decisive factor in the potential increase in match attendance. Another point of contention between the Metros and the NSL was a dispute stemming from a potential player raid on the NSL's youth division. The Hamilton club was granted an NSL franchise and had credentials in the Inter-City Soccer League. After a change in ownership, the Kitchener-based club was renamed Maple Leafs.

The league became once more centered in Southern Ontario as it lost its presence in Northern Ontario with the departure of Sudbury City. The NSL began to experience an increase in match attendance since its initial decrease and stagnation in the mid-1960s.

== Teams ==
Team	City	Stadium	Manager
Hamilton Apollos	Hamilton, Ontario	Ivor Wynne Stadium	Otto Negovetic
Hamilton Croatia	Hamilton, Ontario	Ivor Wynne Stadium	Joe Dundovic
Hamilton Italo-Canadians	Hamilton, Ontario	Ivor Wynne Stadium	Fiorigi Pagliuso
London German Canadians	London, Ontario	Cove Road Stadium	
Ottawa Tigers	Ottawa, Ontario	St. Joseph's High School	Manuel Ramalho
Serbian White Eagles	Toronto, Ontario	Stanley Park Stadium	Dragan Popović
Kitchener Maple Leafs	Kitchener, Ontario	Centennial Stadium	Nobert Englisch
St. Catharines Heidelberg	St. Catharines, Ontario	Club Heidelberg Field	Eddie Brown
Toronto Croatia	Toronto, Ontario	Stanley Park Stadium	Vladimir Šimunić
Toronto First Portuguese	Toronto, Ontario	CNE Stadium Stanley Park Stadium	Luis Vilas
Toronto Hellas	Toronto, Ontario	Stanley Park Stadium	
Toronto Hungaria	Toronto, Ontario	Stanley Park Stadium	
Toronto Italia	Toronto, Ontario	CNE Stadium Stanley Park Stadium	Luis Dabo
Toronto Olympia	Toronto, Ontario	Stanley Park Stadium	
Toronto Ukrainians	Toronto, Ontario	Stanley Park Stadium	

=== Coaching changes ===
Team	Outgoing coach	Manner of departure	Date of vacancy	Position in table	Incoming coach	Date of appointment
Toronto Croatia	Alan Harvey	End of caretaker spell	May 1, 1972		Gordan Irović	May 4, 1972
Hamilton Apollos	Andy Pollack	Resigned	May 17, 1972		Otto Negovetic	May 17, 1972
Toronto Croatia	Gordan Irović	Replaced	May, 1972	1st in May	Vladimir Šimunić	May 29, 1972
Kitchener Maple Leafs	Hans Koebli	Replaced	July 15, 1972		Nobert Englisch	July 15, 1972

Location of NSL teams outside of Toronto for the 1972 NSL season.

== Standings ==
Pos	Team	Pld	W	D	L	GF	GA	GD	Pts	Qualification
1	Toronto Croatia (C)	28	21	7	0	83	10	+73	49	Qualification for Playoffs
2	Serbian White Eagles	28	20	3	5	69	20	+49	43	Qualification for Playoffs
3	Toronto Italia (O)	28	17	8	3	76	14	+62	42	Qualification for Playoffs
4	Hamilton Croatia	28	17	8	3	75	30	+45	42	Qualification for Playoffs
5	Toronto First Portuguese	28	16	6	6	72	32	+40	38	Qualification for Playoffs
6	Toronto Ukrainians	28	13	6	9	56	42	+14	32	Qualification for Playoffs
7	Hamilton Italo-Canadians	28	13	6	9	45	52	−7	32	Qualification for Playoffs
8	St. Catharines Heidelberg	28	11	8	9	36	30	+6	30	Qualification for Playoffs
9	London German Canadians	28	12	5	11	49	45	+4	29	
10	Hamilton Apollos	28	10	3	15	39	46	−7	23	
11	Toronto Hungaria	28	7	6	15	45	53	−8	20	
12	Ottawa Tigers	28	7	4	17	36	56	−20	18	
13	Toronto Olympia	28	3	3	22	30	98	−68	9	
14	Kitchener Maple Leafs	28	4	1	23	26	102	−76	9	
15	Toronto Hellas	28	2	2	24	25	122	−97	6	

Updated to match(es) played on October 30, 1972. Source: http://canadiansoccerleague.ca/wp-content/uploads/2014/06/NSL_1921_1992.pdf
Rules for classification: 1) points; 2) goal difference; 3) number of goals scored.
(C) Champions; (O) Play-off winners

== Playoffs ==
=== Finals ===
October 5, 1972	Toronto Italia	0–0 (a.e.t.) (3–2 p)	Serbian White Eagles	Toronto, Ontario
		[ Report]		Stadium: Stanley Park Stadium; Attendance: 4237; Referee: Bill Divorski

== Canadian Open Cup ==
The Canadian Open Cup was a tournament organized by the National Soccer League in 1971, where the NSL champion would face the Challenge Trophy winners to determine the best team throughout the country. Toronto Croatia was the NSL representative for the second consecutive year, while their opponents were the British Columbia Premier League champions, Vancouver Columbus. New Westminster Blues was the 1972 Challenge Trophy winner, but declined the invitation, which allowed Vancouver Columbus to compete for the title.

October 15, 1972	Toronto Croatia	1–0	Vancouver Columbus	Toronto, Ontario
	Pilas 61'	[ Report]		Stadium: Stanley Park Stadium; Attendance: 2300
