= 1974 National Soccer League season =

National Soccer League
- Season: 1974
- Champions: Serbian White Eagles (regular season); Toronto Croatia (playoffs, 2nd title)
- League cup: Toronto Italia
- Top goalscorer: Momčilo Stojanović (54)
- Best goalkeeper: Blagoje Tamindžić

The 1974 National Soccer League season was the fifty-first season under the National Soccer League (NSL) name. The season began in April and concluded in late October, with Toronto Croatia defeating Toronto Homer for the NSL Championship. The regular-season title was clinched by the Serbian White Eagles, and as a result, they faced the Challenge Trophy champions, Calgary Springer Kickers, for the Canadian Open Cup and successfully claimed the title. The NSL Cup was won by Toronto Italia after defeating Toronto First Portuguese.

The league experienced a further increase in match attendance and played an instrumental role in the construction of Lamport Stadium. Toronto Croatia became involved with the Toronto Metros to form Toronto Metros-Croatia to compete in the 1975 North American Soccer League season.

== Overview ==
The membership in the league increased to 19 members with the additions of Toronto Macedonia and the Quebec Selects. The Selects were a developmental team sponsored by the Quebec government, and Macedonia was another ethnic associated club that represented the Macedonian diaspora in Toronto. The previous time the Macedonian community participated in the NSL was in the 1963 season. The increase in teams prompted the league ownership to partition the league into two separate divisions with a promotion and relegation system for the following season.

The average match attendance increased from the previous season, with the Serbian White Eagles and Toronto Homer as the vanguard clubs in match attendance. The match attendance throughout the NSL would range from 10,000 to 400 spectators. The NSL experienced further riots and fan violence, which was primarily fueled by ethnic rivalries amongst the ethnically associated clubs. The frequent hooliganism throughout the season caused several referees to refuse to officiate in several NSL matches. The league responded by issuing heavier fines and suspensions to the responsible parties. On the North American Soccer League front, the Toronto Metros were experiencing financial difficulties, which resulted in Toronto Croatia becoming an equal financial partner to form Toronto Metros-Croatia.

== Teams ==
Team	City	Stadium	Manager
Hamilton City	Hamilton, Ontario	Ivor Wynne Stadium	
Hamilton Croatia	Hamilton, Ontario	Ivor Wynne Stadium	
Hamilton Italo-Canadians	Hamilton, Ontario	Brian Timmis Stadium	
London City	London, Ontario	Cove Road Stadium	
Montreal Cantalia	Montreal, Quebec	CEPSUM Stadium Jarry Park Stadium	Salvatore Italiano
Quebec Selects	Montreal, Quebec	Jarry Park Stadium	Graham Adams
Ottawa Tigers	Ottawa, Ontario	Mooney's Bay Sports Complex	Nick Iulano
Serbian White Eagles	Toronto, Ontario	CNE Stadium	Dragan Popović
Srbija Kitchener	Kitchener, Ontario		
St. Catharines Heidelberg	St. Catharines, Ontario	Club Heidelberg Field	Alex Crawley
Toronto Croatia	Toronto, Ontario	CNE Stadium	Vladimir Šimunić
Toronto First Portuguese	Toronto, Ontario	CNE Stadium	Luis Dabo
Toronto Homer	Toronto, Ontario	CNE Stadium	
Toronto Hungaria	Toronto, Ontario	CNE Stadium	Tom Boljkovac
Toronto Italia	York, Ontario	York Stadium	Franco Gallina
Toronto Macedonia	East York, Ontario	East York Stadium	
Toronto Melita	Toronto, Ontario	CNE Stadium	
Toronto Polonia	Toronto, Ontario	CNE Stadium	
Toronto Ukrainians	Toronto, Ontario	CNE Stadium	Ostap Steckiw

=== Coaching changes ===
Team	Outgoing coach	Manner of departure	Date of vacancy	Position in table	Incoming coach	Date of appointment
Toronto Croatia	Tom Zlodre	replaced	June 1974		Vladimir Šimunić	June, 1974
Montreal Cantalia	Ottavio Cucuraghi	replaced	June 1974		Salvatore Italiano	June, 1974

Location of NSL teams outside of Toronto for the 1974 NSL season.

Locations of teams in Quebec for the 1974 NSL season.

== Standings ==
Pos	Team	Pld	W	D	L	GF	GA	GD	Pts	Qualification
1	Serbian White Eagles (C)	36	28	7	1	118	16	+102	63	Qualification for Playoffs
2	Toronto Homer	36	26	5	5	89	41	+48	57	Qualification for Playoffs
3	Toronto Croatia (O)	36	23	5	8	78	32	+46	51	Qualification for Playoffs
4	Toronto Italia	36	21	9	6	99	36	+63	51	Qualification for Playoffs
5	Toronto Macedonia	36	22	7	7	102	42	+60	51	Qualification for Playoffs
6	Hamilton Croatia	36	20	9	7	84	43	+41	49	Qualification for Playoffs
7	Toronto First Portuguese	36	23	2	11	78	39	+39	48	Qualification for Playoffs
8	London City	36	19	9	8	89	45	+44	47	Qualification for Playoffs
9	Hamilton City	36	17	8	11	67	58	+9	42	
10	Hamilton Italo-Canadians	36	16	8	12	39	38	+1	40	
11	Quebec Selects	36	13	4	19	44	78	−34	30	
12	Toronto Hungaria	36	12	5	19	70	83	−13	29	
13	Montreal Cantalia	36	9	7	20	42	64	−22	25	
14	St. Catharines Heidelberg	36	9	7	20	39	67	−28	25	
15	Toronto Melita	36	7	9	20	41	80	−39	23	
16	Toronto Ukrainians	36	6	5	25	43	94	−51	17	
17	Toronto Polonia	36	4	4	28	27	96	−69	12	
18	Srbija Kitchener	36	4	4	28	49	150	−101	12	
19	Ottawa Tigers	36	4	1	31	31	126	−95	9	

Updated to match(es) played on October 30, 1974. Source: http://canadiansoccerleague.ca/wp-content/uploads/2014/06/NSL_1921_1992.pdf
Rules for classification: 1) points; 2) goal difference; 3) number of goals scored.
(C) Champions; (O) Play-off winners

== Playoffs ==
=== Quarterfinals ===
October 6, 1974	Serbian White Eagles	3–0	Toronto Macedonia	Toronto, Ontario
	Stojanović, Fahy	[ Report]		Stadium: CNE Stadium

October 7, 1974	Toronto Homer	6–0	Hamilton Croatia	Toronto, Ontario
	Gus Hatoypis,,, Steve Averkioy; Salvatore Pisani	[ Report]		Stadium: CNE Stadium

October 8, 1974	Toronto Croatia	1–0	Toronto First Portuguese	Toronto, Ontario
	Bilić	[ Report]		Stadium: CNE Stadium

=== Semifinals ===
October 9, 1974	Serbian White Eagles	0–1	Toronto Croatia	Toronto, Ontario
		[ Report]	Solak 54'	Stadium: CNE Stadium

October 15, 1974	Toronto Homer	2–1	Toronto Italia	Toronto, Ontario
20:30	Peter Testepasi 49'; Steve Vourdami 55'	[ Report]	Barbieri 80'	Stadium: CNE Stadium; Referee: Hugh Morrow

=== Finals ===
October 20, 1974	Toronto Croatia	1–0	Toronto Homer	Toronto, Ontario
	Psaker	[ Report]		Stadium: CNE Stadium; Attendance: 3150

== Cup ==
The cup tournament was a separate contest from the rest of the season in which all nineteen teams took part. The tournament would conclude in a two-legged match final for the Cup.

=== Finals ===
October 4, 1974	Toronto First Portuguese	1–0	Toronto Italia	Toronto, Ontario
	Jorge Félix 44'	[ Report]		Stadium: CNE Stadium

October 6, 1974	Toronto Italia	2–0	Toronto First Portuguese	Toronto, Ontario
	Barbieri; Romanovic	Report		Stadium: CNE Stadium

== Canadian Open Cup ==
The Canadian Open Cup was a tournament organized by the National Soccer League in 1971, where the NSL champion would face the Challenge Trophy winners to determine the best team throughout the country. The 1974 edition served as a qualifier match to determine the Canadian representative for the CONCACAF Champions' Cup. Serbian White Eagles were the NSL representative for the 1974 competition, while their opponents were Calgary Springer Kickers, who were the Alberta Cup and Challenge Trophy titleholders.

October 19, 1974	Serbian White Eagles	3–1	Calgary Springer Kickers	Toronto, Ontario
	Fahy 15'; Stojanović 25'; Mile Skoric 60'	[ Report]	Ray Cannon 62'	Stadium: CNE Stadium; Attendance: 366
