= 1971 National Soccer League season =

National Soccer League
- Season: 1971
- Champions: Toronto Croatia (regular season, 2nd title); Toronto Croatia (playoffs, 1st title)
- League cup: Toronto First Portuguese
- Top goalscorer: Ferruccio Deni (24)
- Best goalkeeper: Željko Bilecki

The 1971 National Soccer League season was the forty-eighth season under the National Soccer League (NSL) name. The season began in early May and concluded in October with the Canadian Open Cup final, where Toronto Croatia defeated Challenge Trophy champions Vancouver Eintracht. The Croatians would secure a treble by successfully defending their regular-season title and defeating Toronto First Portuguese for the NSL Championship. The NSL Cup was successfully defended by Toronto First Portuguese, who defeated Sudbury City.

The Canadian Open Cup was created by the NSL to determine a national champion through an annual knock-out cup competition where all professional and amateur Canadian clubs were invited to participate.

== Overview ==
The National Soccer League became centered once more within the boundaries of Ontario after the departure of Soccer Portugais du Quebec of Montreal. The city of Hamilton also witnessed a reduction in team representation as Hamilton Homer requested a leave of absence. Despite the departures, the region of Northern Ontario was added to the circuit once again as Sudbury Italia returned under the name Sudbury City. The league expanded into the Niagara region for the first time as St. Catharines Heidelberg was granted a franchise. Heidelberg previously competed in the Inter-City Soccer League. Ottawa Sons of Italy began a process of Canadianizing their organization by renaming the team Ottawa Tigers.

The NSL experienced competition from the American-based North American Soccer League as it expanded into Ontario with the creation of the Toronto Metros. The league's match attendance continued to surge and surpassed the previous season's gate earnings at Stanley Park Stadium. The Toronto-based teams averaged around 1100 fans at Stanley Park. The league ownership also approved the creation of an under-23 division.

== Teams ==
| Team | City | Stadium | Manager |
|---|---|---|---|
| Hamilton Apollos | Hamilton, Ontario | Hamilton AAA Grounds | Andy Pollock |
| Hamilton Croatia | Hamilton, Ontario | Hamilton AAA Grounds | Jackie Thoms |
| London German Canadians | London, Ontario | Cove Road Stadium | |
| Ottawa Tigers | Ottawa, Ontario | St. Joseph's High School | |
| Serbian White Eagles | Toronto, Ontario | Stanley Park Stadium | Dragan Popović |
| Kitchener Kickers | Kitchener, Ontario | | |
| St. Catharines Heidelberg | St. Catharines, Ontario | Club Heidelberg Field | Eddie Brown |
| Sudbury City | Sudbury, Ontario | Queen's Athletic Field | |
| Toronto Croatia | Toronto, Ontario | Stanley Park Stadium | Ivan Jazbinšek |
| Toronto First Portuguese | Toronto, Ontario | Stanley Park Stadium | |
| Toronto Hellas | Toronto, Ontario | Stanley Park Stadium | |
| Toronto Hungaria | Toronto, Ontario | Stanley Park Stadium | |
| Toronto Olympia | Toronto, Ontario | Stanley Park Stadium | |
| Toronto Ukrainia | Toronto, Ontario | Stanley Park Stadium | Alan O’Neill |

=== Coaching changes ===
| Team | Outgoing coach | Manner of departure | Date of vacancy | Position in table | Incoming coach | Date of appointment |
|---|---|---|---|---|---|---|
| St. Catharines Heidelberg | Alf Herman | Replaced | July 5, 1971 | | Eddie Brown | July 5, 1971 |

Location of NSL teams outside of Toronto for the 1971 NSL season.

== Standings ==
| Pos | Team | Pld | W | D | L | GF | GA | GD | Pts | Qualification |
|---|---|---|---|---|---|---|---|---|---|---|
| 1 | Toronto Croatia (C, O) | 26 | 22 | 3 | 1 | 58 | 14 | +44 | 47 | Qualification for Playoffs |
| 2 | Toronto First Portuguese | 26 | 17 | 4 | 5 | 45 | 19 | +26 | 38 | Qualification for Playoffs |
| 3 | Hamilton Croatia | 26 | 14 | 5 | 7 | 38 | 31 | +7 | 33 | Qualification for Playoffs |
| 4 | Toronto Ukrainians | 26 | 14 | 3 | 9 | 47 | 28 | +19 | 31 | Qualification for Playoffs |
| 5 | Sudbury City | 26 | 14 | 3 | 9 | 55 | 34 | +21 | 31 | Qualification for Playoffs |
| 6 | Toronto Olympia | 26 | 11 | 5 | 10 | 49 | 40 | +9 | 27 | Qualification for Playoffs |
| 7 | London German Canadians | 26 | 12 | 2 | 12 | 57 | 54 | +3 | 26 | Qualification for Playoffs |
| 8 | St. Catharines Heidelberg | 26 | 11 | 3 | 12 | 42 | 42 | 0 | 25 | Qualification for Playoffs |
| 9 | Serbian White Eagles | 26 | 9 | 5 | 12 | 37 | 39 | −2 | 23 | |
| 10 | Toronto Hellas | 26 | 10 | 3 | 13 | 36 | 41 | −5 | 23 | |
| 11 | Toronto Hungaria | 26 | 11 | 1 | 14 | 40 | 52 | −12 | 23 | |
| 12 | Ottawa Tigers | 25 | 5 | 8 | 12 | 29 | 53 | −24 | 18 | |
| 13 | Hamilton Apollos | 26 | 3 | 5 | 18 | 23 | 69 | −46 | 11 | |
| 14 | Kitchener Kickers | 26 | 2 | 6 | 18 | 31 | 65 | −34 | 10 | |

Updated to match(es) played on October 30, 1971. Source:
Rules for classification: 1) points; 2) goal difference; 3) number of goals scored.
(C) Champions; (O) Play-off winners

== Playoffs ==
=== Quarterfinals ===
| October 3, 1971 | Toronto Croatia | 3–0 | Sudbury City | Toronto, Ontario |
| | Bradvic 18'; Mesik Slatko 27'; Pilaš 37' | [ Report] | | Stadium: Stanley Park Stadium; Attendance: 1837 |

| October 3, 1971 | Hamilton Croatia | 2–0 | London German Canadians | Toronto, Ontario |
| | | [ Report] | | Stadium: Stanley Park Stadium |

| October 4, 1971 | Toronto First Portuguese | 5–2 | Toronto Olympia | Toronto, Ontario |
| | Antonio Rodrigues 16', 22', 43'; Emilio Hernandez 21'; Costa 37' | [ Report] | John McGurk 22'; John Wark 70' | Stadium: Stanley Park Stadium |

| October 5, 1971 | Toronto Ukraina | 2–1 | St. Catharines Heidelberg | Toronto, Ontario |
| | Keith Summers 88', 114' | [ Report] | Douglas 25' | Stadium: Stanley Park Stadium; Attendance: 1000 |

=== Semifinals ===
| October 7, 1971 | Toronto Croatia | 1–0 | Hamilton Croatia | Toronto, Ontario |
| | Pilaš 30' | [ Report] | | Stadium: Stanley Park Stadium |

| October 8, 1971 | Toronto First Portuguese | 3–0 | Toronto Ukraina | Toronto, Ontario |
| 20:30 | Antonio Rodrigues, Paulino Ferrari | [ Report] | | Stadium: Stanley Park Stadium |

=== Finals ===
| October 11, 1971 | Toronto Croatia | 1–0 | Toronto First Portuguese | Toronto, Ontario |
| 15:00 | Pilaš 31' | [ Report] | | Stadium: Stanley Park Stadium; Attendance: 7000; Referee: Alf Roberts |

== Cup ==
The cup tournament was a separate contest from the rest of the season, in which all fourteen teams took part. The tournament would conclude in a final match for the Cup.

=== Semifinals ===
| August 23, 1971 | Toronto First Portuguese | 1–0 | Toronto Hellas | Toronto, Ontario |
| | Correia 56' | [ Report] | | Stadium: Stanley Park Stadium; Attendance: 3457; Referee: Alf Roberts |

| September 26, 1971 | Sudbury City | 1–0 | Ottawa Tigers | Sudbury, Ontario |
| | Ferruccio Deni 10'; George Courtney 49' | [ Report] |

=== Finals ===
| October 3, 1971 | Toronto First Portuguese | 3–0 | Sudbury City | Toronto, Ontario |
| | Piotti 26'; Valdemar Serrano 40'; Paulino Ferrari 65' | [ Report] | | Stadium: Stanley Park Stadium; Attendance: 3518 |

== Canadian Open Cup ==
The Canadian Open Cup was a tournament organized by the National Soccer League in 1971, where the NSL champion would face the Challenge Trophy winners to determine the best team throughout the country. The tournament was intended to form an annual knock-out cup competition open to all Canadian professional and amateur clubs to determine a national champion. The championship was initially sponsored by the Macdonald Tobacco Company and was named the Export Trophy. Toronto Croatia, as the NSL champions, was selected as the league's representative while their opponents were Vancouver Eintracht of the Pacific Coast Soccer League, who were the Challenge Trophy titleholders.

| October 17, 1971 | Toronto Croatia | 3–0 | Vancouver Eintracht | Toronto, Ontario |
| 14:30 | Pilaš 38'; Solak 45'; Bradvic 87' | [ Report] | | Stadium: Stanley Park Stadium; Attendance: 4373; Referee: Emerson Mathurin |

== Individual awards ==
The NSL awards were given to recipients from St. Catharines Heidelberg, Sudbury City, and Toronto Croatia. The most gentlemanly team award was given to St. Catharines, and league official John Parfect received the most dedicated official award. Željko Bilecki of Toronto Croatia, was named the goalkeeper of the year, and would later represent the Canada national team and play in the North American Soccer League. The league's top goal scorer was Sudbury's Ferruccio Deni, and he later returned to the NSL to play with the Sudbury Cyclones. The final award went to Hugh Morrow as the top referee throughout the season.

| Award | Player (Club) |
|---|---|
| NSL Top Goal Scorer | Ferruccio Deni (Sudbury Italia) |
| NSL Goalkeeper of the Year Award | Željko Bilecki (Toronto Croatia) |
| NSL Referee of the Year Award | Hugh Morrow |
| NSL Official of the Year Award | John Parfect |
| NSL Most Gentlemanly Team Award | St. Catharines Heidelberg |
