= Ibrahim Arslanovic =

Croatian footballer

Personal information
- Date of birth: 1952 (age 73–74)
- Place of birth: PR Croatia, FPR Yugoslavia
- Position: Midfielder

Senior career*
Years	Team	Apps	(Gls)
1973–1974	Toronto Croatia		
1975	Toronto Metros-Croatia	3	(0)
1975	Toronto Croatia		
1977	Toronto Croatia		
- * Club domestic league appearances and goals

Ibrahim Arslanovic (born 1952) is a Croatia born-Yugoslav retired footballer who played in the National Soccer League, and North American Soccer League.

== Career ==
Arslanovic played with Toronto Croatia in the National Soccer League in 1973. He re-signed with Croatia for the 1974 season. In 1975, he signed with Toronto Metros-Croatia in the North American Soccer League, where he appeared in three matches. For the remainder of the 1975 season he returned to play with Toronto Croatia in the NSL. He returned to play with Toronto Croatia for the 1977 season.
