= Grubesic =

Grubesic is a Croatian surname. Notable people with the name include:

- Goran Grubesic (born 1982), Croatian footballer
- John Grubesic (born 1965), American politician
