= Lapovo (village) =

Coordinates: 44.188111°N 21.076735°E

Lapovo Лапово
- Village
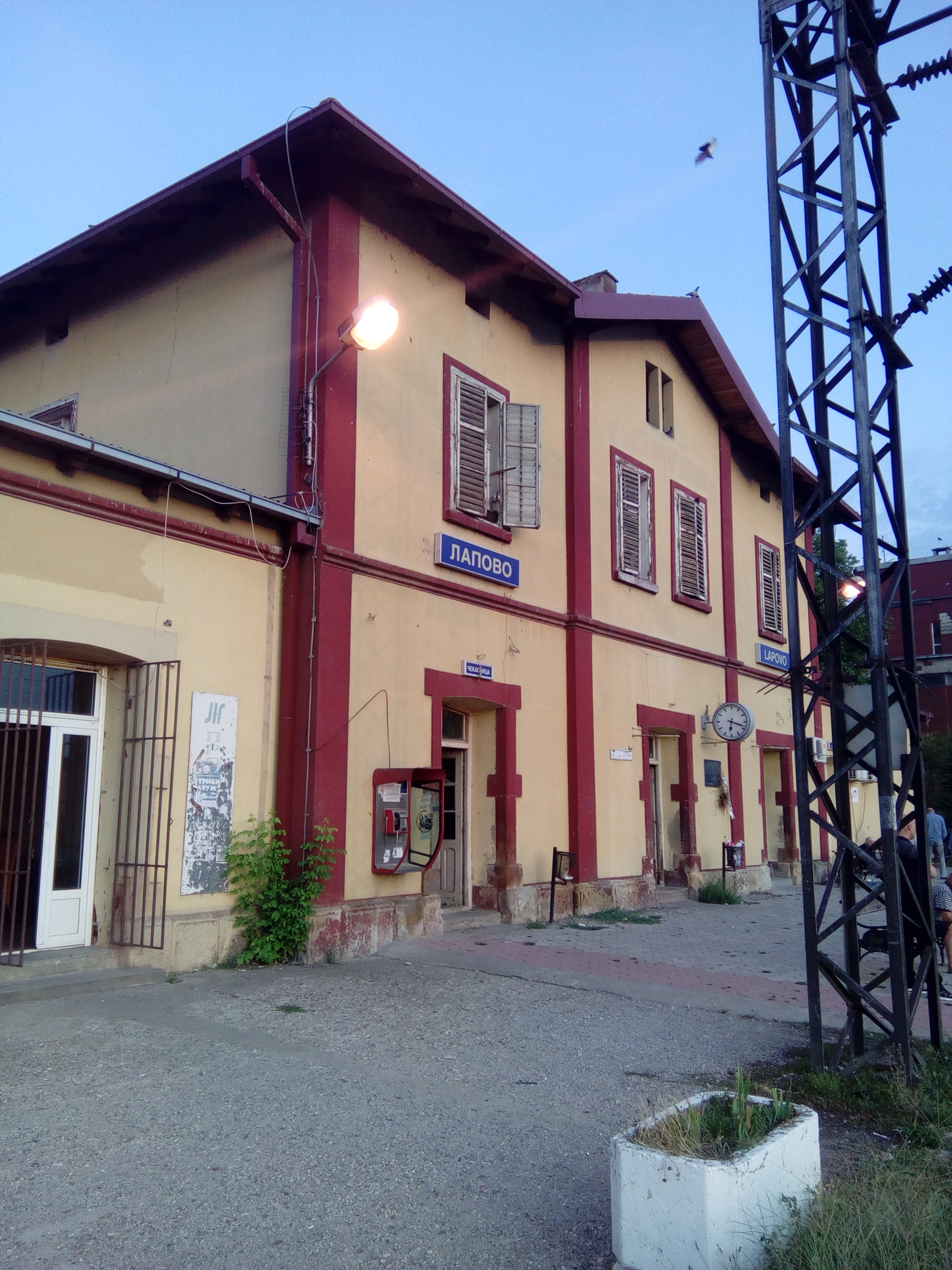
- Lapovo train station
- Interactive map of Lapovo
- Country: Serbia
- District: Šumadija District
- Municipality: Lapovo

Population (2011)
  - Total: 694
- Time zone: UTC+1 (CET)
  - Summer (DST): UTC+2 (CEST)

Lapovo (Serbian Cyrillic: Лапово) is a village situated in Lapovo municipality in Serbia.
