= Pralija =

Pralija is a Croatian surname, traditionally found in the area of Šibenik. Notable people with the surname include:

- Mladen Pralija (born 1959), Croatian footballer
- Nenad Pralija (born 1970), Croatian footballer
