= Mirela Radenković =

Serbian politician

Mirela Radenković (Serbian Cyrillic: Мирела Раденковић; born 24 September 1976) is a politician in Serbia. She has served in the National Assembly of Serbia since October 2020 as a member of the Serbian Progressive Party.

== Private career ==
Radenković is an entrepreneur. She lives in Lapovo.

== Politician ==
=== Municipal politics ===
Radenković received the lead position on the Progressive Party's electoral list for the Lapovo municipal assembly in the 2016 Serbian local elections and was elected when the list won ten out of twenty-nine mandates. The Progressives narrowly lost the popular vote to a local group called Svi za Lapovo but subsequently joined a local coalition government; Radenković was chosen as deputy mayor and served in this role for the next four years. She was given the second position on the party's list for the 2020 Serbian local elections and was re-elected when the list won a majority victory with sixteen mandates. She is now the president (i.e., speaker) of the local assembly.

=== Parliamentarian ===
Radenković was awarded the 193rd position on the Progressive Party's Aleksandar Vučić — For Our Children list for the 2020 Serbian parliamentary election and narrowly missed direct election when the list won a landslide majority with 188 of 250 mandates. She received a mandate on 28 October 2020 as the replacement for another party member. She is a member of the parliamentary friendship groups with Austria, Belgium, China, Germany, Greece, Russia, Slovenia, Switzerland, and the United States of America.
