= Jose Sambu =

Portuguese footballer

Personal information
- Place of birth: Portuguese Guinea
- Position: Defender

Senior career*
Years	Team	Apps	(Gls)
1963–1964	Lusitano Évora	16	(5)
1964–1965	Sanjoanense		
1965–1966	Lusitano Évora	21	(4)
1971–1973	Toronto First Portuguese		
1971	→Toronto Metros (loan)	1	(0)
1973	Toronto Portuguese (indoor)		
- * Club domestic league appearances and goals

Jose Sambu or Coró is a Bissau-Guinean-born Portuguese former footballer who played as a defender.

== Career ==
Sambu played in the Primeira Divisão in 1963 with Lusitano Évora. The following season he played in the Segunda Divisão with A.D. Sanjoanense. He returned to his former club Lusitano Évora in 1965. In 1971, he played abroad in the National Soccer League with Toronto First Portuguese. In July, 1971 he was loaned to the Toronto Metros of the North American Soccer League because of a player shortage due to inquires. He made one appearance for the Metros during his short stint.

He re-signed with Toronto First Portuguese for the 1972 season. In the winter of 1973 he played at the indoor level with Toronto Portuguese in the Toronto Indoor Soccer League.
