= Jorge Félix =

Jorge Félix may refer to:

- Jorge Félix (Brazilian footballer) (born 1940), Brazilian football midfielder
- Jorge Félix (Spanish footballer) (born 1991), Spanish football winger
