= Jimmy Cardno =

Welsh footballer (born 1946)

Personal information
- Date of birth: 23 May 1946
- Place of birth: Scotland
- Date of death: 26 January 2021 (aged 74)
- Place of death: Wales
- Position(s): Striker

Senior career*
Years	Team	Apps	(Gls)
1963–1968	Rhyl		
1969–1971	Toronto Croatia		
1972	Rhyl		
1973	Polonia Sydney		
1973	Haarlem		
1974	Rhyl		
- * Club domestic league appearances and goals

Jimmy Cardno (23 May 1946 - 26 January 2021) was a Welsh footballer who played as a striker.

== Early life ==
Cardno was born to Jim and Margaret Cardno. He had six younger siblings.

== Education ==
Cardno obtained a high school diploma. He studied the French and German languages.

== Career ==
Cardno started his career with Welsh side Rhyl. He was described as "one of the legendary figures in Rhyl football history". In 1969, he signed for Canadian side Toronto Croatia. In 1972, he signed for Welsh side Rhyl. In 1973, he signed for Australian side Polonia Sydney. After that, he signed for Dutch side Haarlem. In 1974, he signed for Welsh side Rhyl.

== Personal life ==
Cardno was married. He had three sons and five grandchildren.
