= Welland Lions Croatia =

Canadian association football team

- Full name: Welland Lions Croatia
- Founded: 1970 (as Hamilton Apollos)
- Dissolved: 1977
- Stadium: Plymouth Park; Welland, Ontario; Ivor Wynne Stadium; Hamilton, Ontario
- League: National Soccer League

Welland Lions Croatia was a soccer club based in Welland, Ontario. The club was founded in 1970 and originally played in Hamilton, Ontario as Hamilton Apollos. It was later renamed Hamilton City in 1973 and ultimately relocated to Welland in 1976. The club played in the National Soccer League (NSL) for seven seasons from 1970 until 1976. In 1977, St. Catharines Roma replaced Welland in the NSL by acquiring their franchise rights.

The club's home venue was originally at Ivor Wynne Stadium, and later when relocated to Welland at Plymouth Park.

== History ==
Hamilton Apollos was granted a franchise in the National Soccer League (NSL) in 1970. In 1971, Andy Pollock served in a dual capacity of general manager and head coach. Hamilton's player recruitment policy was generally geared towards a developmental approach with the average player being 20 years old. In 1973, the club was rebranded as Hamilton City and became associated with the Croatian Canadian community in Hamilton, Ontario. In 1975, the NSL ownership decided to partition the league into two separate divisions with a promotion and relegation system with Hamilton being placed in the First Division.

Andy Pollock returned as head coach for the 1975 season, and the club avoided relegation by finishing in seventh place. The following season the club was relocated to Welland, Ontario, and became known as Welland Lions Croatia. Their home venue was located at Plymouth Park. After the 1976 season, Welland was relegated to the Second Division by finishing at the bottom of the table. In 1977, the club's franchise rights were purchased by St. Catahrines Roma.

== Coaches ==
- Andy Pollock (1971)
- Andy Pollock (1975)

== Seasons ==
| Season | League | Teams | Record | Rank | Playoffs | Ref |
|---|---|---|---|---|---|---|
| 1970 | National Soccer League | 14 | 6–4–16 | 12th | – | |
| 1971 | National Soccer League | 14 | 3–5–18 | 13th | – | |
| 1972 | National Soccer League | 15 | 10–3–15 | 10th | – | |
| 1973 | National Soccer League | 17 | 8–7–15 | 12th | – | |
| 1974 | National Soccer League | 19 | 17–8–11 | 9th | – | |
| 1975 | National Soccer League (First Division) | 10 | 15–6–17 | 7th | – | |
| 1976 | National Soccer League (First Division) | 10 | 3–2–22 | 10th | – | |
