= Flavio Ivanovic =

Argentine footballer (born 1965)

Personal information
- Full name: Flavio Jorge Ivanovic
- Date of birth: 28 January 1965 (age 61)
- Place of birth: Buenos Aires, Argentina
- Position: Forward

Senior career*
Years	Team	Apps	(Gls)
1985–1986	Platense	0	(0)
1985–1986	Acassuso		
1986–1988	Temperley	9	(1)
1988–1989	Platense	6	(0)
1989–1990	Temperley	2	(0)
1990	Toronto Croatia		
1990–1991	Atlanta		
1991	Toronto Internatinol		
- * Club domestic league appearances and goals

Flavio Ivanovic (born 28 January 1965) is an Argentine former footballer who played as a forward.

== Career ==
Ivanovic signed with Platense in the Argentine Primera División, but was loaned in 1985 to play with Acassuso in the Primera D Metropolitana. In 1986, he played with Temperley. He returned to play with Platense in 1988 where he appeared in six matches. He returned to play with Temperley in 1989 in the Primera D Metropolitana. In 1990, he played in the Primera B Nacional with Atlanta.

In the summer of 1990 he played abroad in the National Soccer League with Toronto Croatia, and the following season with Toronto International.
