= Velimir Crljen =

Croatian footballer and manager

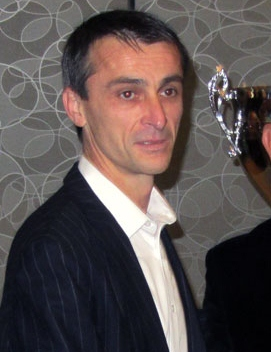
- Crljen in 2011

Personal information
- Full name: Velimir Crljen
- Date of birth: 23 July 1966 (age 60)
- Place of birth: SFR Yugoslavia
- Position: Midfielder

Senior career*
Years	Team	Apps	(Gls)
1992	HNK Šibenik	1	(0)
1993	Toronto Croatia		
1994	Toronto Rockets	5	(1)
1996–1998	Singapore Armed Forces FC		
2000	Toronto Croatia		
2001	Jurong FC		
2002–2006	Toronto Croatia		

Managerial career
- 2000: Toronto Croatia (player/coach)
- 2003: Toronto Croatia (player/coach)
- 2005: Toronto Croatia (player/coach)
- 2009: Toronto Croatia
- 2011–2015: Toronto Croatia
- * Club domestic league appearances and goals

Velimir Crljen (born 23 July 1966) is a Croatian retired footballer and manager who played in the Croatian First Football League, American Professional Soccer League, Canadian Professional Soccer League, and S.League. He also had several notable terms as a manager for Toronto Croatia in the CPSL/CSL.

== Playing career ==
Crljen played with HNK Šibenik of the Croatian First Football League in 1992. In 1993, he played abroad in the Canadian National Soccer League with Toronto Croatia. The following season played in the American Professional Soccer League with the Toronto Rockets. He made his debut on 8 July 1994 against Seattle Sounders. In 1996, he played in the newly formed S.League with the Singapore Armed Forces FC, where he formed an instrumental triumvirate with fellow Croatian imports Ivica Raguz, and Jure Ere. During his tenure with SAFFC he won the three league titles, Singapore Cup, and the Singapore FA Cup.

In 2000, he returned to Canada in the role of player/coach for Toronto Croatia in the Canadian Professional Soccer League. Crljen managed to achieve a CPSL Championship after defeating the Toronto Olympians. After a one-year absence he returned to Singapore to sign with Jurong FC. In 2002, he permanently returned to Toronto Croatia, where he would eventually make the full transition from a player to a manager. He won his second CPSL Championship as a player in 2004.

== Managerial career ==
In 2003, he resumed his dual role of player/coach for Toronto. After a year sabbatical from coaching, he returned to manage in 2005 and was named the head coach for the 2006 CSL All-Star team. In 2009, he fully retired from competitive soccer and returned to managing Toronto Croatia, where he was dismissed at the conclusion of the season. He returned in 2011 to lead Croatia to a championship, and followed by a double in 2012. In 2012, he was recognized by the league with the Coach of the Year award. He added another championship title in 2015, making Crljen one of the most successful managers in CPSL/CSL history.

== Honours ==
=== Player ===
Singapore Armed Forces FC

- S.League (2): 1997, 1998
- Singapore FA Cup (1): 1997
- Singapore Cup (1): 1999

Toronto Croatia

- CPSL Championship (2): 2000, 2004

=== Managerial ===
Toronto Croatia

- CSL Championship (3): 2011, 2012, 2015
- Canadian Soccer League Regular Season Champions (1): 2012
