= Mike Stojanović =

Canadian soccer player (1947–2010)

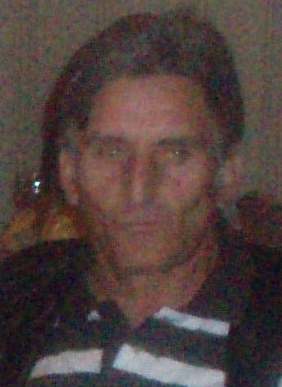
- Stojanović in 2007

Personal information
- Full name: Momčilo Stojanović
- Date of birth: 26 January 1947
- Place of birth: Lapovo, FPR Yugoslavia
- Date of death: 18 November 2010 (aged 63)
- Place of death: Toronto, Ontario, Canada
- Height: 1.85 m (6 ft 1 in)
- Position: Striker

Senior career*
Years	Team	Apps	(Gls)
1966–1969	Morava Velika Plana		
1969–1973	Radnički Kragujevac		
1973	Vardar		
1973–1976	Serbian White Eagles	85	(98)
1976–1980	Rochester Lancers	115	(51)
1979–1980	Hartford Hellions (indoor)	9	(1)
1981–1982	San Diego Sockers	52	(32)
1981–1982	San Diego Sockers (indoor)	5	(2)
1982	San Jose Earthquakes	12	(2)
1983	Hamilton Steelers		

International career
1980–1981	Canada	15	(5)
- * Club domestic league appearances and goals

Momčilo "Mike" Stojanović (Serbian Cyrillic: Момчило Мајк Стојановић, Serbian pronunciation: [mǒmtʃilo mǎjk stojǎːnoʋitɕ]; 26 January 1947 – 18 November 2010) was a professional soccer forward most notably playing in the NASL. Born in Yugoslavia, he represented the Canadian national team.

== Early life ==
Mike Stojanović, nicknamed Stole in Serbian and Stollie in English, was born on 26 January 1947 in Lapovo (PR Serbia, FPR Yugoslavia) to parents Vitomir and Ruža.

== Club career ==
=== Early career ===
Stojanović spent time in the Yugoslav First League in 1969 with Radnički Kragujevac where he assisted the club in successfully avoiding relegation to the second tier. For his part, he contributed seven goals throughout the season. He briefly played in the Yugoslav second tier with Jedinstvo Paraćin in 1971 before returning to the Radnicki. He also had stints with Vardar Skopje and Morava Velika Plana.

The Yugoslavian soccer structure was affected by the monetary reforms imposed by the country's president Josip Tito in the early 1970s which resulted in a decrease in payouts to players. The cutbacks caused Stojanović to seek opportunities outside of Yugoslavia. Before moving to North America, Stojanović was set to join OGC Nice, but there were complications with his documentation upon signing. He also had intentions of playing in West Germany but ultimately landed in Canada.

=== Serbian White Eagles ===
In 1973, he landed in Canada's National Soccer League with Toronto-based club Serbian White Eagles FC. In his debut season with Toronto, he assisted the club in securing a postseason berth where he contributed two goals against Toronto Homer in the opening round. He played in the second round of the playoffs where he recorded a goal against Toronto Hungaria but the Serbs were eliminated from the competition.

Stojanović returned to the Serbs for his sophomore season where he produced a league record by registering 54 goals in 36 matches which ultimately secured him the top goal scorer award. The feat is still a club and National Soccer League record. His contributions helped the Serbs in clinching the regular season title. He also was featured in the Canadian Open Cup where he contributed a goal against Calgary Springer Kickers which secured the title and a berth in the CONCACAF Champions' Cup.

In 1975, he finished the season once more as the league's top goal scorer with 42 goals in 36 matches.

On 7 August 2009 in a pre-game ceremony, the Serbian White Eagles retired the number 9 which was worn by Stojanović while playing for the club from 1974 to 1975. This is the only number the club has retired.

=== Rochester Lancers ===
Momčilo was recruited by former Toronto head coach Dragan Popović to join the Rochester Lancers in the American-based North American Soccer League in 1976. It was his time in Rochester when his name became anglicized to Mike by the media. He had a productive debut season with the Lancers where he scored 17 goals and finished with 41 points, marking him the league's fourth-leading scorer. He also assisted Rochester in securing a playoff berth after a three-year absence. He participated in the preliminary round of the playoffs where the upstate New York club was eliminated from the competition by Toronto Metros-Croatia.

Stojanović's contract was renewed for another season in 1977. In his sophomore season in Rochester, he once more aided the team in securing another playoff berth. For the second consecutive season, he finished as the club's top goal scorer with 14 goals. In the opening round of the postseason, he contributed a goal in a penalty shootout against the St. Louis Stars. In the Conference finals, he recorded a goal against the New York Cosmos in the opening match, but the Lancers were eliminated from the competition after losing both matches. Following the conclusion of the season he was named to the league's All-Star Second Team. The club also selected him to the Rochester Lancers Team of the Decade.

His third season with Rochester was cut short after suffering a leg injury which ruled him out for the majority of the season. Throughout the 1978 season, he would appear in 12 matches and registered 4 goals. For the 1979 season, he transitioned into a midfielder role where he would support striker Branko Šegota with a club record of 13 assists and 4 goals. The 1980 season, marked his final run with the organization where he managed to surpass Carlos Metidieri record as the club's all-time goal scorer with 51 goals. He finished the season as the club's top goal scorer along with Segota with 11 goals.

=== North American Soccer League ===
In 1981, Rochester had their franchise revoked which resulted in the San Diego Sockers signing Stojanović to a multi-year deal.

He was fifth-best the following season with 14 goals and 33 total points. His most productive season was in 1981 when he finished third with 23 goals and 52 total points while playing for the San Diego Sockers (1981–1982) and was named the NASL's North American Player of the Year. Stojanović also played for the San Jose Earthquakes (1982) which was his last season in the NASL. Stojanović is 9th on the All-Time NASL Top Scorers list with 83 goals in 179 appearances and 10th on the all-time points list with 211, ahead of fellow NASL players George Best, Pelé and Franz Beckenbauer. He was a 2nd Team NASL All-Star in 1977 and an Honorable Mention All-Star in 1981.

=== Canada ===
In 1983, he returned to Canada to play with the Hamilton Steelers in the newly formed Canadian Professional Soccer League. Stojanović recorded his first goal for the club in the debut match on 23 May 1983, against the Edmonton Eagles. Shortly after his first match, he received a lengthy suspension as he missed a practice session, but the suspension was later revoked. The Steelers would reach the championship finals in the playoffs where they were defeated by Edmonton.

In 1992, Stojanović, aged 45, played for United Serbs FC based in Oshawa.

== International career ==
Stojanović was 33 years old when he won his first cap with Canada's senior team on 15 September 1980 in Vancouver (a 4–0 win over New Zealand), scoring on his debut. He played in all of Canada's games in 1980 and 1981, a total of 15 times, scoring five goals. His final cap came in a 2–2 draw on 21 November 1981 versus Cuba in a 1982 World Cup qualification match in Tegucigalpa.

Stojanović was inducted into the Canada Soccer Hall of Fame on 6 June 2009.

As part of the Canadian Soccer Association's 2012 centennial celebration, Stojanović was honoured on the list of the top 100 men's footballers.

=== International goals ===
Scores and results list Canada's goal tally first.

#	Date	Venue	Opponent	Score	Result	Competition
1.	15 September 1980	Empire Stadium, Vancouver, Canada	New Zealand	4–0	4–0	Friendly match
2.	18 October 1980	Exhibition Stadium, Toronto, Canada	Mexico	1–0	1–1	1982 FIFA World Cup qualification
3.	12 October 1981	Skinner Park, San Fernando, Trinidad and Tobago	Trinidad and Tobago	3–0	4–2	Friendly match
4.	2 November 1981	Estadio Tiburcio Carías Andino, Tegucigalpa, Honduras	El Salvador	1–0	1–0	1982 FIFA World Cup qualification
5.	6 November 1981	Estadio Tiburcio Carías Andino, Tegucigalpa, Honduras	Haiti	1–1	1–1	1982 FIFA World Cup qualification

== Death ==
On 18 November 2010, Stojanović, aged 63, died in Toronto after a battle with stomach cancer. He is interred at the Serbian Orthodox Holy Transfiguration Monastery in Milton.

== Honours ==
Serbian White Eagles

- National Soccer League Regular Season: 1974
- Canadian Open Cup: 1974

Individual

- National Soccer League Top Scorer: 1974, 1975
- North American Soccer League All-Star Second Team: 1977
- North American Soccer League All-Star Honourable Mention: 1981
- North American Player of the Year: 1981
- Canada Soccer Hall of Fame Honoured Player: 2009
- Canada Soccer Top 100 Men's Footballers: 2012
