= Antonijo Zupan =

Serbian footballer

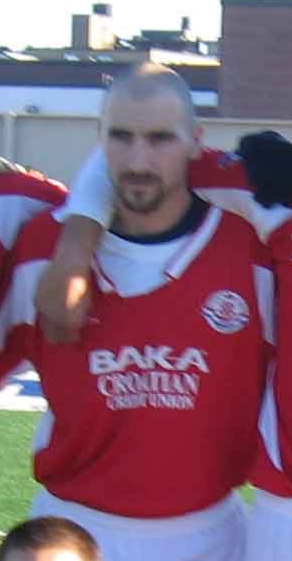
- Zupan in 2005

Personal information
- Full name: Antonijo Zupan
- Date of birth: 10 October 1976 (age 50)
- Place of birth: SR Croatia, SFR Yugoslavia
- Position: Defender

Senior career*
Years	Team	Apps	(Gls)
1995–1999	Zadarkomerc	66	(2)
1999–2002	Istra	10	(1)
2003–2006	Toronto Croatia	67	(16)
2007–2008	Hamilton Croatia		
2009	Toronto Croatia	4	(0)
2010	Hamilton Croatia	17	(1)
2011	SC Toronto	8	(0)
- * Club domestic league appearances and goals

Antonijo Zupan (born October 10, 1976) is a Croatian retired footballer who played in the Croatian First Football League, and the Canadian Soccer League.

== Playing career ==
Zupan began his career with Zadarkomerc in the Croatian First Football League in 1995, where he would spend a total of four seasons appearing in 66 matches and recording one goal. After the relegation of NK Zadar to the Croatian Second Football League, he signed with NK Istra. In 2003, he went abroad to Canada to sign with Toronto Croatia of the Canadian Professional Soccer League. He made his debut for the club on July 11, 2003 in the match against St. Catharines Wolves. Throughout the season he helped Toronto clinch a postseason berth by finishing third in the Western Conference. He featured in the quarterfinal match against the Brampton Hitmen, where Toronto won the match by winning a penalty shootout by a score of 4-3. Unfortunately the result was reversed by the league after Toronto was caught fielding an illegal player. The following season, he helped Toronto finish second in the Western Conference, and featured in all the postseason matches. He featured in the CPSL Championship match against the Vaughan Shooters, he contributed by scoring a goal in a 4-0 victory clinching his first championship with the club.

In the 2006 season he was selected to the CPSL All-Star roster which faced Clyde F.C. in a friendly match. He helped Toronto finish second in the International Division, and featured in the playoff quarterfinal match against the Laval Dynamites. In the next round Toronto was eliminated by a score of 1-0 by the Italia Shooters. In 2007, Zupan signed with rivals Hamilton Croatia of the Ontario Soccer League. In his debut season he helped Hamilton claim the Hamilton Spectator Cup. He returned to Toronto Croatia for the 2009 CSL season, and helped Toronto clinch a playoff berth by finishing second in the International Division. He featured in the quarterfinal match against the Brampton Lions FC, and advanced to the next round. In the semi-finals Croatia faced archrivals the Serbian White Eagles, where in the first match he scored a goal in a 3-1 defeat. Unfortunately Croatia were eliminated from the playoffs in the second match.

On May 12, 2010, Zupan returned to Hamilton Croatia and was appointed the team captain after the team was promoted to the CSL for the 2010 season. Unfortunately he was involved in a controversial match against his former team the Toronto Croatia, where during the derby match Zupan was involved in a confrontation with the match official, and as a result the league banned Zupan for the rest of the season. In 2011, he signed with SC Toronto, and helped the club win the regular season championship by finishing first in the overall standings. He featured in the playoff quarterfinal series against the York Region Shooters, where both clubs tied the series by a score of 4-4 goals on aggregate, and where they went into a penalty shootout where York Region came victorious in a 4-2 victory.

== Match fixing controversy ==
On September 12, 2012 the CBC reported that a CSL match between the Trois-Rivières Attak and Toronto Croatia held in September 2009 was fixed. Zupan being one of the players listed as taking a bribe of €15,000 (C$18,000), who was to share it with others on his team, including players. When asked about the bribe Zupan denied any knowledge or involvement in the incident.

== Honors ==
Toronto Croatia

- CPSL Championship: 2004

Hamilton Croatia

- Hamilton Spectator Cup: 2007

SC Toronto

- Regular- Season Championship: 2011
