= Josip Bonacin =

Croatian footballer

Personal information
- Full name: Josip Bonacin
- Date of birth: 10 February 1984 (age 42)
- Place of birth: SR Croatia, SFR Yugoslavia
- Height: 1.92 m (6 ft 4 in)
- Position: Defender

Youth career
- Jadran (KS)

Senior career*
Years	Team	Apps	(Gls)
- Jadran (KS)
2004	Trnje		
2005–2006	Solin	41	(1)
2006	Međimurje	22	(1)
2007–2009	Šibenik	16	(1)
2009	Unirea Alba Iulia	6	(0)
2010–2011	Zhetysu	17	(0)
2011	Dugopolje	6	(0)
2012	Jadran (KS)	16	(0)
2012	Toronto Croatia	2	(0)
2013–2014	GOŠK Gabela	24	(0)
2015	Zagora Unešić		
2015	Kastel Gomlica		
- * Club domestic league appearances and goals as of 29 May 2013

Josip Bonacin (born 10 February 1984) is a Croatian former footballer who played in the Croatian Second Football League, Croatian First Football League, Liga I, Kazakhstan Premier League, Canadian Soccer League, Premier League of Bosnia and Herzegovina, and First County Football League.

== Club career ==
Josip began his career playing for his home town, NK Solin in the Croatian Second Football League appearing 41 time and scored once for the team. Bonacin has previously played in the Croatian Prva HNL for NK Međimurje and HNK Šibenik. In 2009, he went abroad to Romania to play with FC Unirea Alba Iulia in the Liga I. After one season in Romania he went to Asia to play with FC Zhetysu in the Kazakhstan Premier League.

After being released by FC Zhetysu he left Kazakhstan to attend a trial with the Malaysian Super League champions, Kelantan FA. Josip appeared with Kelantan FA in a friendly match against Indonesian outfit, Pelita Jaya which ended in a 1–1 draw. In 2011, he returned home to play with NK Dugopolje in the 2.HNL. In 2012, he went overseas to Canada to sign with Toronto Croatia in the Canadian Soccer League. He made his debut on 30 September 2012 against Windsor Stars. During his short tenure with Toronto he won the regular season title, and the CSL Championship against Montreal Impact Academy.

He returned to the Balkans in 2013 to play with NK GOŠK Gabela in the Premier League of Bosnia and Herzegovina. In 2015, he returned to Croatia to play with NK Zagora Unešić, and Kastel Gomlica.
