= Jure Pavić =

Croatian former footballer (born 1975)

Personal information
- Date of birth: September 13, 1975 (age 51)
- Place of birth: SR Croatia, SFR Yugoslavia
- Position: Midfielder

Senior career*
| Years | Team | Apps | (Gls) |
| 1995–1996 | Neretva | 29 | (2) |
| 1996–1998 | Šibenik | 1 | (0) |
| 1999 | SC Weismain | 18 | (2) |
| 2003 | Toronto Croatia | 7 | (2) |
| 2004 | Toronto Lynx | 5 | (0) |
| 2006 | Toronto Croatia | 6 | (2) |
- * Club domestic league appearances and goals

Jure Pavić (born September 13, 1975) is a Croatian former footballer who played primarily as a midfielder with notable stints in the Croatian First Football League, Canadian Professional Soccer League, and the USL A-League.

== Playing career ==
Pavic played in the Croatian First Football League in 1995, where he would play with NK Neretva, and HNK Šibenik. In 1999, he went abroad to play in the Bayernliga with SC Weismain. He went overseas in 2003 to play in the Canadian Professional Soccer League with Toronto Croatia. The following season he signed with the Toronto Lynx of the USL A-League. He made his debut on May 28, 2004 against the Montreal Impact. In 2006, he returned to play with Toronto Croatia.
