= London German Canadians =

Canadian soccer team

- Full name: London German Canadians
- Founded: 1935
- Stadium: Cove Road Stadium; London, Ontario
- League: Western Ontario Soccer League

London German Canadians is a Canadian soccer club based in London, Ontario. The club was formed in 1935 and originally competed in the London and District Soccer League. After a successful decade at the amateur level throughout the 1960s, the club joined the National Soccer League (NSL) in 1969. London played in the NSL for four seasons from 1969 until the 1972 season. In 1973, the club departed from the NSL, with London City acquiring its NSL rights.

Since their departure from the NSL circuit, they returned to the London and District Soccer League, and later played in the Western Ontario Soccer League. The club's home venue is located at Cove Road Stadium.

== History ==
London German Canadians were formed in 1935 with Rudi Haehnel and Otto Meyer as the primary driving forces behind the project. Both men were members of the German Canadian Club, a social club for the German Canadian community in London, Ontario. The club competed in the London and District Soccer League as a founding member, and their original home venue was located at C.N.R.A. Park. In 1952, their parent company, the German Canadian Club, constructed a soccer stadium known as the Cove Road Stadium for their soccer program. The club went through an internal dispute in 1956, which caused a schism within the organization, with several members departing to join the St. Thomas German Canadian Club.

London experienced a successful decade in the 1960s as the club added multiple silverware to its trophy cabinet. The club secured the First Division Championship initially in 1961, and successfully defended the title consecutively between 1962 and 1963. The German Canadians would also add to their resume five consecutive International Cups, the City League Cup twice in 1962 and 1965. In 1969, the club transitioned into the professional ranks by joining the National Soccer League and retaining a reserve team in the London and District Soccer League.

In preparation for their professional debut, the organization assigned the general manager title to club vice president Markus Gauss. Julius Kaponya was named the head coach, and primarily recruited players from the local soccer circuits. In their debut season in the NSL, the Germans finished in tenth position. In the following season, the club's player recruitment policy was slightly modified, with London retaining several veterans and the addition of imports. The head coach's responsibilities were assigned to Phil Brooman. The club experienced success as they qualified for the postseason by finishing in fifth place.

In the 1971 season, London secured a playoff berth by finishing seventh and was eliminated in the first round of the playoffs by Hamilton Croatia. To remain competitive with the Toronto-based teams, London began recruiting import players and league veterans and placing less emphasis on local players. London failed to secure a playoff berth in the 1972 season, but the club managed to attract a respectable attendance record throughout the season, with numbers ranging from 500 to 1500. After failing to secure the necessary financial resources to field a competitive team at the professional level, London was forced to sell their NSL franchise rights to London City in 1973, an organization founded by former club vice president Markus Gauss.

In 1973, London returned to the London and District Soccer League. The conclusion of the decade saw German Canadians achieve their best performance at the Ontario Cup wherein in the 1979 tournament they reached the semi-finals but were defeated by Delia SC. London became a charter member of the Western Ontario Soccer League when the London and District Soccer League and Inter-County Soccer Leagues merged in 1988.

== Head coaches ==
- Kurt Teutscher (1961)
- Gerd Czuprina (1962)
- Julius Kaponya (1963)
- Julius Kaponya (1969)
- Phil Brooman (1970)

- Julius Kaponya (1972)
- Ken Turner (1979-1980)
- Jurgen Belle (1986)
- Jurgen Belle (1989)

== Seasons ==
Season	League	Teams	Record	Rank	Playoffs	Ref
1969	National Soccer League	14	8–4–14	10th	–	
1970	National Soccer League	14	13–6–7	5th	–	
1971	National Soccer League	14	12–2–12	7th	Quarterfinals	
1972	National Soccer League	15	12–5–11	9th	–	
