= Jerko Granic =

Croatian footballer

Personal information
- Place of birth: Zagreb, Yugoslavia
- Position: Midfielder

Senior career*
Years	Team	Apps	(Gls)
1959–1961	Hajduk Split	6	(0)
1961–1969	NK Karlovac		
1970–1971	Toronto Croatia		
1975	Toronto Metros-Croatia	0	(0)
- * Club domestic league appearances and goals

Jerko Granic is a Croatian retired footballer who played in the Yugoslav First League, Yugoslav Second League, and the National Soccer League.

== Club career ==
Granic began playing football at the junior level with Hajduk Split, and went professional with Hajduk in 1959. After three seasons with Hajduk he signed with NK Karlovac in the Yugoslav Second League. In 1970, he went abroad to play in the National Soccer League with Toronto Croatia, he won the NSL Championship in 1971. He later was signed by Toronto Metros-Croatia in the North American Soccer League in 1975.
