= George Simcich =

Canadian soccer player

Personal information
- Date of birth: January 1, 1942 (age 84)
- Place of birth: Rijeka, Croatia
- Position: Midfielder

Senior career*
Years	Team	Apps	(Gls)
1962-1963	HNK Rijeka		
1964-1973	Toronto Croatia		
1968-1969	Croatia SC Vancouver		
1970-1970	Los Angeles Croatia		
1971-1973	Toronto Metros		

International career
1972	Canada	70	(0)
- * Club domestic league appearances and goals

George Simcich (born January 1, 1942) was a Croatian-Canadian soccer player who later served as General Manager of Toronto Metros-Croatia of the North American Soccer League. He was also a member of the Canadian national soccer team.

== Club career ==
George Simcich began his soccer journey with Torpedo before moving up to NK Rijeka, which was in the Yugoslav First League, the country’s top division in 1963. He represented NK Rijeka and competed at the world renowned ViaReggio Cup in Italy for three years, notably scoring against Juventus in February 1963. He carried his passion for soccer and his European experience with him when he immigrated to Toronto in 1964 where he joined Toronto Croatia in the National Soccer League and played with them until 1973. He was recruited to play a few games for Croatia SC Vancouver in the Pacific Coast League. He played for a winter season for the Los Angeles Croatia Soccer Club in the Greater Los Angeles Soccer League in 1970. The club was National Challenge Cup runner-up in 1970. While he was with Toronto Croatia, he was selected as a league All-Star in 1968, 1969 and 1971. The Toronto Croatia Soccer Club was the winner of the Canada Cup in 1971 and 1972. He finished his playing career in 1973 with the Toronto Metros of the North American Soccer League.

== National team ==
Simcich was selected and represented Canada in FIFA World Cup Qualifiers in 1972, although he was recovering from a hamstring injury. He made one international appearance on 2 September 1972 in an exhibition match against a Guatemalan which ended in a 2-2 draw.

== General Manager ==
Simcich served as Toronto Metros-Croatia general manager from 1975 through 1977, helping the club win Soccer Bowl '76 to claim their first North American championship. Toronto Metro Croatia won 3-0 over Minnesota in the Final. The 1976 Soccer Bowl was unforgettable as Toronto Metros-Croatia, featuring legendary Eusébio as a key player, won the NASL championship—the first major professional soccer title by a Canadian club in North America. He left Metros-Croatia before the 1978 season.

== Recognition ==
Simcich’s contributions to Canadian soccer have been recognized by several organizations and public officials throughout his life.

In September 2024, Simcich was honoured in front of 35,000 fans by Toronto FC (part of the MLS league) at BMO Field, recognizing his role in the growth of soccer in Toronto and Canada.

In 2025, Simcich received a letter of recognition from the President of the Viareggio Cup, one of the world’s most prestigious international youth football tournaments, recognizing his goal against Juventus while representing NK Rijeka in the 1963 tournament. On 11 July 2026, the tournament featured Simcich on its official website, highlighting his football career and legacy more than six decades after his participation.

On July 2nd, 2026, Simcich was featured in The Globe and Mail, during the 2026 FIFA World Cup in an article highlighting his role as a player, executive, and builder of soccer in Toronto and Canada.

On July 19 2026, Simcich was spotlighted in Novi List, a Croatian national newspaper, for his accomplishments in Croatia and his lasting contributions to Canadian soccer.
