= Roman Harapyn =

Canadian former soccer player

Personal information
- Full name: Roman Harapyn
- Place of birth: Etobicoke, Ontario, Canada
- Positions: Goalkeeper; defender

Senior career*
Years	Team	Apps	(Gls)
1995	Toronto Italia	10	(0)
1997	Toronto Croatia	5	(0)
1997	Toronto Lynx	1	(0)
2005	Toronto Croatia	19	(0)
- * Club domestic league appearances and goals as of 04 April 2015

Roman Harapyn is a Canadian former soccer player who played in the Canadian National Soccer League, Canadian Professional Soccer League, and the USL A-League.

== Playing career ==
Harapyn began his professional with the Toronto Italia of the Canadian National Soccer League in 1995. He made his debut for the club on May 29, 1995 against the Hamilton White Eagles. In 1997, he signed with Toronto Croatia, but was picked up by the Toronto Lynx of the USL A-League midway through the season due to a goalkeeper shortage. He made his debut for the club on August 31, 1997 against the Hershey Wildcats coming on as a substitute for Joe Ciaravino who was ejected from the match. He featured in the 1st round playoff match against the Montreal Impact where the Lynx were defeated by a score of 2-1.

In 2005, Harapyn returned to the Toronto Croatia and made his debut on May 29, 2005 in a 0-0 draw against the Vaughan Shooters. He started off as the starting goalkeeper for Croatia due to a suspension George Azcurra received at the end of the 2004 season. He featured as a defender for the rest of the season after the return of Azcurra from his suspension. He helped Toronto second in the Eastern Conference but failed to feature in the postseason due to a suspension.
