= Corcel Blair =

Jamaican footballer (1950–2008)

Personal information
- Date of birth: 26 September 1950
- Place of birth: Jamaica
- Date of death: 21 August 2008 (aged 57)
- Place of death: Jamaica
- Position: Forward

Youth career
- 1966–1970: Vere Technical

Senior career*
Years	Team	Apps	(Gls)
1971	Sudbury City		
1972–1974	Toronto Croatia		
1975	Toronto Metros-Croatia	8	(0)
1975–1977	Santos F.C.		
1977	Sudbury Cyclones		

International career
1969–1974	Jamaica	6	(2)
- * Club domestic league appearances and goals

Corcel Blair (26 September 1950 – 21 August 2008) was a Jamaican footballer who played in the National Soccer League, North American Soccer League, and National Premier League.

== Career ==
Blair began his career in 1966 at the youth level with Vere Technical, where he won the daCosta Cup four times. In 1971, he went abroad to play in the National Soccer League with Sudbury City. The following season he played with Toronto Croatia, where he assisted in securing the regular season title. Throughout this tenure with Croatia he won the NSL Championship in 1974, and another regular season title in 1973.

In 1975, he was recruited to play in the North American Soccer League, where he appeared in eight matches for the Toronto Metros-Croatia. He returned to Jamaica in 1975 to play with Santos F.C. in the National Premier League, where he won four consecutive Premier League titles. In 1977, he played in the Second Division of the National Soccer League with Sudbury Cyclones. Sudbury released Blair from his contract in July, 1977 due to financial reasons.

He made the transition to managing in 1980 with the Magic Athletic Club in the Toronto & District League.

== International career ==
Blair made his debut for the Jamaica national football team on 2 June 1969 against Haiti. In total he appeared in 6 matches and recorded 2 goals. He featured in the 1969 CONCACAF Championship qualification matches.

== Personal life ==
His son Corcel Blair, Jr. was the technical director for the Caribbean Selects in the Canadian Soccer League. He died on August 21, 2008.
