= Ivan Žgela =

Croatian footballer

Personal information
- Date of birth: 24 January 1982 (age 44)
- Place of birth: Vinkovci, SR Croatia, SFR Yugoslavia
- Height: 1.84 m (6 ft 0 in)
- Position: Midfielder

Youth career
- Cibalia

Senior career*
Years	Team	Apps	(Gls)
2001–2006	Cibalia	85	(12)
2006–2007	Inter Zaprešić	20	(3)
2007	Grindavík	11	(1)
2008	Cibalia	4	(0)
2008–2009	Novalja	21	(5)
2009	Toronto Croatia	4	(0)
2010	Farashganj		
2010	Toronto Croatia		
2011–2017	Bedem Ivankovo		

International career
2002	Croatia U20	1	(0)
2003–2004	Croatia U21	6	(0)
- * Club domestic league appearances and goals

Ivan Žgela (born 24 January 1982) is a Croatian footballer who plays as a midfielder.

== Career ==
Žgela played in the Croatian First Football League with HNK Cibalia in 2001. During his tenure with Cibalia he participated in the 2003 UEFA Intertoto Cup. In 2006, he played in the Croatian Second Football League with NK Inter Zaprešić. He went abroad in 2007 to play with Grindavík in the 1. deild karla. The following season he returned to Croatia to have stints with Cibalia, and NK Novalja. In 2009, he went overseas to sign with Toronto Croatia in the Canadian Soccer League. Following a short stint in the Bangladesh Premier League with Farashganj SC he returned to Toronto for the 2010 season. In 2011, he returned to Europe in order to play in the Treća HNL with NK Bedem Ivankovo.
