= Mirsad Cehaic =

Croatian footballer

Personal information
- Date of birth: June 15, 1951 (age 75)
- Place of birth: PR Croatia, FPR Yugoslavia
- Position: Defender

Senior career*
Years	Team	Apps	(Gls)
1974	Toronto Croatia		
1975	Toronto Metros-Croatia	9	(0)
- * Club domestic league appearances and goals

Mirsad Cehaic (born June 15, 1951) is a Croatian former footballer who played in the National Soccer League, and North American Soccer League.

== Club career ==
Cehaic played with Toronto Croatia in the National Soccer League in 1974. In 1975, he signed with Toronto Metros-Croatia in the North American Soccer League, where he appeared in nine matches.
