= Zlatko Haraminčić =

Croatian footballer and manager

Personal information
- Date of birth: January 8, 1942 (age 84)
- Place of birth: Zagreb, Independent State of Croatia
- Position: Midfielder

Senior career*
| Years | Team | Apps | (Gls) |
| 1960–1964 | Dinamo Zagreb | 21 | (2) |
| 1966–1967 | Kapfenberger SV | | |

Managerial career
- 1993–1996: Windsor Croatia
- 1997: Toronto Croatia
- * Club domestic league appearances and goals

Zlatko Haraminčić (born January 8, 1942) is a Croatian former footballer and manager.

== Club career ==
Haraminčić began his career in 1960 with Dinamo Zagreb in the Yugoslav First League. Throughout his time with Dinamo he secured the 1962–63 Yugoslav Cup and featured in the 1963–64 European Cup Winners' Cup. In 1966, he played with Kapfenberger SV in the Austrian Football Bundesliga.

== Managerial career ==
In 1993, Haraminčić was named the manager for Windsor Croatia. In the 1995 Ontario Cup, he led Windsor to the finals by defeating defending champions Scarborough Azzurri. In the finals, Windsor defeated the Sarnia Bluewater Blaze. Following Windsor's victory in the provincial tournament, he continued to manage the team in the 1995 Canada Soccer National Championship. He re-signed with Windsor for the 1996 season.

In 1997, he managed Toronto Croatia in the Canadian National Soccer League. In his debut season in the CNSL circuit, he secured a playoff berth.
