= Harry de Vlugt =

Indonesian-born Dutch footballer

Personal information
- Date of birth: 27 May 1947
- Place of birth: Bandung, Dutch West Indies
- Date of death: 6 November 2016 (aged 69)
- Place of death: Enschede, Netherlands
- Position: Midfielder

Youth career
- 1960-1961: EVV Phenix
- 1961-1964: SC Enschede

Senior career*
| Years | Team | Apps | (Gls) |
| 1964–1965 | SC Enschede | | |
| 1965–1967 | FC Twente Enschede | | |
| 1967–1969 | GVV Eilermark | | |
| 1969 | German Canadian FC | | |
| 1970 | Toronto Croatia | | |
| 1970–1971 | GVV Eilermark | | |
| 1971–1972 | SV Meppen | | (18) |
| 1972–1975 | Rot-Weiss Essen | 27 | (11) |
- * Club domestic league appearances and goals

Harry de Vlugt (26 May 1947 – 6 November 2016) was an Indonesian-born Dutch footballer who played in the Eredivisie, Regionalliga Nord, National Soccer League, and Bundesliga.

== Playing career ==
De Vlught was born in the Dutch East Indies, and emigrated to Netherlands in his youth. He began playing in 1961 with SC Enschede, and later played in the Eredivisie with FC Twente. He also had a stint with GVV Eilermark at the amateur level. In 1969, he went abroad to play in the National Soccer League with the German Canadians FC, and Toronto Croatia. In 1971, he returned to Europe to play in the Regionalliga Nord with SV Meppen, where he recorded 18 goals. The following season he was signed by Rot-Weiss Essen of the Bundesliga, where in his debut season he scored 11 goals in 22 matches. In 1974, he missed the majority of the season after sustaining an injury, as a result was released at the conclusion of the season. De Vlught died on November 6, 2016.
