= Carmelo Barbieri =

Italian-born Canadian soccer player

Personal information
- Date of birth: 24 February 1956 (age 70)
- Place of birth: Calabria, Italy
- Position: Striker

Senior career*
Years	Team	Apps	(Gls)
1974–1975	Toronto Italia		
1975–1976	Casertana	16	(1)
1977	Lavello	27	(11)
1978–1979	Monopoli	46	(6)
1981	Ariano Irpino	25	(7)
1983	Ariano Irpino	29	(11)
1986	Ariano Irpino	22	(2)

International career
1973–1974	Canada U20	8	(6)
1974	Canada	1	(0)
- * Club domestic league appearances and goals

Carmelo Barbieri (born 24 February 1956) is an Italian-born Canadian soccer player who earned one cap for the national team in 1974.

== Career ==
Barbieri originally played with Toronto Westwood, and in 1974 he played in the National Soccer League with Toronto Italia. In 1975, he played in the Serie C with Casertana. In the summer of 1975 he returned to play with Toronto Italia where he assisted in securing the First Division title. The following season he played in the Serie D with Lavello, and later in the Serie C2 with Monopoli. In 1981, he played in the Campionato Interregionale with Ariano Irpino.

== International career ==
Barbieri made his debut for Canada in an April 1974 friendly match against Bermuda.
