= Mladen Pralija =

Croatian former professional footballer (born 1959)

Personal information
- Date of birth: 28 January 1959 (age 67)
- Place of birth: Šibenik, FPR Yugoslavia
- Position: Goalkeeper

Senior career*
Years	Team	Apps	(Gls)
1977–1978	Hajduk Split		
1978–1979	RNK Split	48	(0)
1979–1982	Hajduk Split	10	
1982–1985	Šibenik	120	(0)
1986–1987	Hajduk Split	31	(0)
1987-1988	Hamburger SV	20	(0)
1988	Čelik Zenica	4	(0)
1988–1992	Hajduk Split	69	(0)
1992	Pazinka	4	(0)
1992–1993	Toronto Croatia	50	(0)

Managerial career
- 1993: Toronto Croatia
- 1993–1999: Hajduk Split (assistant)
- 1999: Singapore Armed Forces
- 2000–2003: Hajduk Split (goalkeeping coach)
- 2004–2006: Hajduk Split (goalkeeping coach)
- 2006: Toronto Croatia
- 2008: Luch-Energiya (assistant)
- 2010: Istra 1961 (assistant)
- 2010–2012: Croatia (goalkeeping coach)
- 2012: Lokomotiv Moscow (goalkeeping coach)
- 2013–2014: Croatia U19 (assistant)
- 2014–2015: RNK Split (assistant)
- 2015–2016: Sheriff Tiraspol (assistant)
- 2017: Apollon Smyrnis (assistant)
- 2017: Atyrau (assistant)
- 2018: Hajduk Split (goalkeeping coach)
- * Club domestic league appearances and goals

Mladen Pralija (born 28 January 1959) is a Croatian former professional footballer who played as a goalkeeper.

== Playing career ==
Pralija began his career in the Yugoslav First League with Hajduk Split in 1977. He made his club debut on 11 November 1981 in a Cup match against Napredak. He also had stints with RNK Split, Šibenik, and Čelik Zenica. In 1987, he played abroad in the Bundesliga with Hamburger SV. After the formation of the Croatian First Football League he played with NK Pazinka. He played abroad once more in 1992 in the National Soccer League with Toronto Croatia.

== Managerial career ==
After his retirement from competitive football he made the transition to a football manager. In 1999, he managed the Singapore Armed Forces FC in the S.League. There he achieved the Singapore Cup for the team. In 2018, he was appointed assistant manager under Zoran Vulić for Hajduk Split in the Croatian First Football League. He also worked as Vulić' assistant at Istra, RNK Split, Luch Energiya, Sheriff Tiraspol, Atyrau and Apollon Smyrnis.
