= Boris Psaker =

Croatian former footballer (born 1955)

Personal information
- Date of birth: 25 January 1955 (age 71)
- Place of birth: FPR Yugoslavia
- Position: Forward

Senior career*
Years	Team	Apps	(Gls)
1970–1974	Toronto Croatia		
1975	Toronto Metros-Croatia	12	(2)
1977	Toronto Croatia		
1979	Windsor Croatia		
1979–1980	Detroit Express	4	(0)
1981	New York Eagles		
- * Club domestic league appearances and goals

Boris Psaker (born January 25, 1955) is a Croatian former footballer who played in the National Soccer League, North American Soccer League, and the American Soccer League.

== Career ==
Psaker was a product of the Dinamo Zagreb academy system. In 1970, he played abroad in the National Soccer League with Toronto Croatia from 1970 till 1974. In 1974, he featured in the NSL Championship final against Toronto Homer, and contributed the winning goal for Croatia. In 1975, he made the transition to the North American Soccer League by signing with Toronto Metros-Croatia. He returned to Toronto Croatia for the 1977 season, and assisted in securing their spot in the NSL First division.

In 1979, he played in the Southwestern Ontario Soccer League with Windsor Croatia. During the off season he played indoor soccer with the Detroit Express, where he appeared in four matches. In 1981, he played in the American Soccer League with New York Eagles.

== Honors ==
Toronto Croatia

- NSL Championship: 1974
