= Marijan Bradvic =

Croatian footballer (1948–2019)

Marijan Bradvić
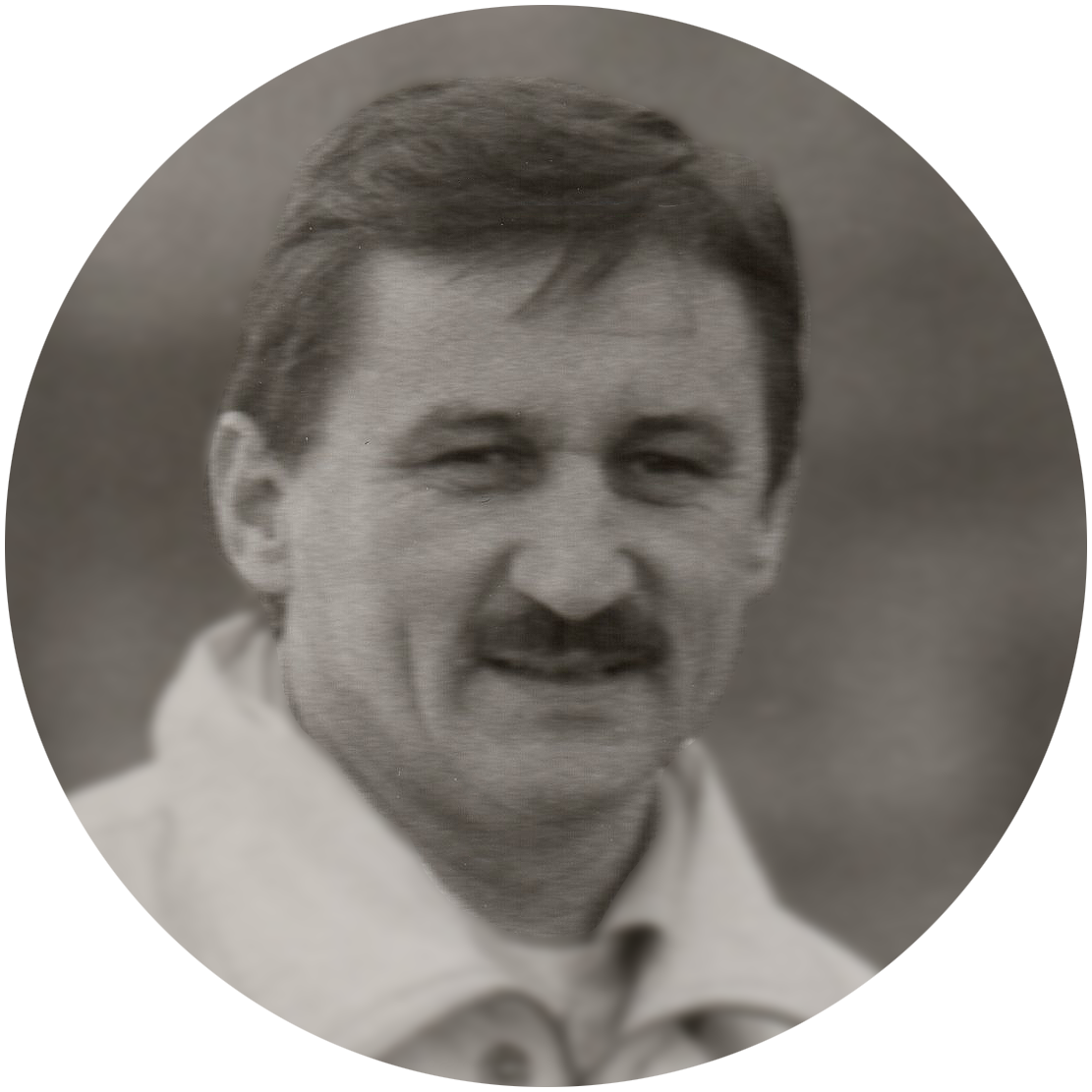

Personal information
- Date of birth: 8 December 1948
- Place of birth: Zagreb, PR Croatia, FPR Yugoslavia
- Date of death: 23 February 2019 (aged 70)
- Place of death: Zagreb, Croatia
- Position: Midfielder

Senior career*
Years	Team	Apps	(Gls)
1968–1971	Dinamo Zagreb	6	(0)
1968	→ Rijeka (loan)		
1971	→ Toronto Croatia (loan)		
1975	Toronto Metros-Croatia	9	(3)
1977	Toronto Metros-Croatia	14	(2)
1977–1978	Jedinstvo Bihać	58	(10)
1978–1979	Dinamo Zagreb	26	(1)
1981–1982	Buffalo Stallions (indoor)		

International career
1978	Yugoslavia Amateur	1	(0)
- * Club domestic league appearances and goals

Marijan Bradvić (8 December 1948 – 23 February 2019) was a Croatian footballer who played primarily in Yugoslavia, and in North America.

== Playing career ==
Bradvić began playing football in 1964 at the youth level with Dinamo Zagreb and subsequently signed a professional in 1968. In his debut season, he was loaned to HNK Rijeka, of the Yugoslav Second League where he won promotion to the Yugoslav First League in 1969. After touring the United States and Canada in 1970 the club decided to loan Bradvic to Toronto Croatia in the National Soccer League, where he won the NSL Championship in 1971. In 1975, he played in the North American Soccer League with the Toronto Metros-Croatia, where he appeared in nine matches and recorded three goals. He had another stint with Toronto in 1977. He returned to Yugoslavia in 1977 to have a stint with NK Jedinstvo Bihać, and with Dinamo in 1978. In 1981, he played indoor soccer with the Buffalo Stallions in the Major Indoor Soccer League.

== International career ==
Bradvić played for the Yugoslavia amateur team against West Germany in the UEFA Amateur Cup on 13 May 1978.

== Personal life ==
Bradvić's sons Mislav and Petar Bradvić also became footballers. Bradvić died on 23 February 2019.
