= Jorge Félix (Brazilian footballer) =

Brazilian footballer (born 1940)

Personal information
- Full name: Jorge Félix Correia
- Date of birth: 21 June 1940 (age 86)
- Place of birth: Brazil
- Position: Midfielder

Senior career*
Years	Team	Apps	(Gls)
1967	Portuguesa F.C.		
1968–1969	Bonsucesso Futebol Clube		
1970	Bangu Atlético Clube		
1970–1971	Boavista F.C.	11	(1)
1971	Toronto Metros	16	(6)
1971–1972	Boavista F.C.	24	(7)
1972–1973	S.C. Farense	9	(0)
1973–1974	Leixões S.C.	22	(7)
1974	First Portuguese		
1974	S.C. Salgueiros		
- * Club domestic league appearances and goals

Jorge Félix Correia, known as Jorge Félix (born June 21, 1940) is a Brazilian former football player.

== Career ==
Correia played in 1967 with Portuguesa F.C., and later with Bonsucesso Futebol Clube and Bangu Atlético Clube. In 1970, he played abroad in the Primeira Divisão with Boavista F.C. In 1971, he played in the North American Soccer League with Toronto Metros. In his debut season with Toronto he was named to the NASL Second team. The following season he returned to Boavista, and ultimately had stints with S.C. Farense, and Leixões S.C.

In 1974, he returned to Canada to play in the National Soccer League with First Portuguese. During his tenure with the club he featured in a friendly match with Toronto Croatia against SV Werder Bremen, where he was loaned to Toronto in order to appear in the match. In 1975, he played in the Portuguese Second Division with S.C. Salgueiros.
