= Saban Romanovic =

Serbian footballer

Saban Ramanovic
Personal information
- Place of birth: Yugoslavia
- Position: Forward

Senior career*
Years	Team	Apps	(Gls)
1972	Serbian White Eagles		
1973–1974	Veracruz		
1974	Serbian White Eagles		
1975–1976	Toronto Italia		
1977–1978	Toronto Panhellenic		
- * Club domestic league appearances and goals

Saban Ramanovic is a Serbian retired footballer and coach, who played as a forward.

== Career ==
Ramanovic went overseas in 1972 to play in the National Soccer League with the Serbian White Eagles along with teammate Mike Bakić. In his debut season with the White Eagles he finished as the league's top goal scorer with 23 goals. The following season he played in the Mexican Primera División with C.D. Veracruz. After a season in Mexico he returned to play with the Serbian White Eagles for the 1974 season.

In 1975, he signed with league rivals Toronto Italia, and assisted in securing the NSL Championship. He also featured in the Canadian Open Cup where he contributed a goal in securing the title against London Boxing Club of Victoria. In 1977, he played with Toronto Panhellenic, and finished as the league's top goal scorer for the second time in his career.
