= Goran Grubesic =

Croatian footballer

Personal information
- Place of birth: Switzerland
- Position: Midfielder

Senior career*
Years	Team	Apps	(Gls)
1996	Singapore Armed Forces FC	12	(0)
2003	Toronto Croatia	8	(0)
- * Club domestic league appearances and goals

Goran Grubesic is a Swiss former footballer who played in the S.League, and the Canadian Professional Soccer League.

== Club career ==
Grubesic played in the S.League in 1996 with Singapore Armed Forces FC. During his tenure with SAFFC he won the 1996 Pioneer Series. In 2003, he went abroad to play in the Canadian Professional Soccer League with Toronto Croatia. During his time with Croatia he assisted in clinching a postseason berth by finishing third in the Western Conference. In the postseason Croatia was eliminated from the competition after a defeat to the Brampton Hitmen.
