= Carlos Correia (footballer) =

Portuguese footballer

Personal information
- Full name: Carlos Alberto Correia
- Place of birth: Portugal
- Position: Forward

Senior career*
| Years | Team | Apps | (Gls) |
| 1968–1969 | CUF | 2 | (0) |
| 1969–1970 | Luso Futebol Clube | | |
| 1970–1971 | Farense | 19 | (1) |
| 1971 | Montreal Olympique | 8 | (2) |
| 1971 | Toronto First Portuguese | | |
| 1973 | Luso Stars Mount Royal | | |
- * Club domestic league appearances and goals

Carlos Alberto Correia is a Portuguese former footballer who played as a forward.

== Career ==
Correia played in the Primeira Divisão in 1968 with Grupo Desportivo da CUF. The following season he played in the Segunda Divisão with Luso Futebol Clube. In 1970, he returned to the top tier to play with Sporting Clube Farense. Correia played abroad in 1971 in the North American Soccer League with Montreal Olympique. He recorded his first goal for Montreal on May 23, 1971, against New York Cosmos.

For the remainder of the 1971 season he played in the National Soccer League with Toronto First Portuguese. In his debut season with Toronto he assisted in securing the NSL Cup by defeating Sudbury City. In 1973, he played in the Quebec National Soccer League with Luso Stars Mount Royal.
