= Alan Harvey =

Soccer player (born 1942)

Personal information
- Date of birth: 11 April 1942 (age 84)
- Place of birth: Barnsley, England
- Height: 5 ft 9 in (1.75 m)
- Position: Defender

Senior career*
Years	Team	Apps	(Gls)
1961	Gainsborough Trinity		
1961–1963	Toronto City		
1963–1964	Denaby United		
1964–1966	Toronto Roma		
1968	Toronto Falcons	28	(3)
1969	Rochester Lancers		
1970	Serbian White Eagles		
1970–1972	Toronto Croatia		

International career
1968	Canada	4	(0)

Managerial career
- 1970: Serbian White Eagles
- 1972: Toronto Croatia
- * Club domestic league appearances and goals

Alan Harvey (born 11 April 1942) is a former professional soccer player. He played club soccer for Toronto Roma, Toronto Falcons, Rochester Lancers, and Toronto Croatia. Born in England, he represented Canada at international level.

== Club career ==
Harvey played in the Midland League in 1961 with Gainsborough Trinity. In 1961, he played in the Eastern Canada Professional Soccer League with Toronto City for three seasons. During the off season he continued playing in the Midland League with Denaby United in the 1963–64 season. In 1963, Toronto City traded Harvey to Toronto Roma for Ray Edwards and George Crook. In 1968, he played in the North American Soccer League with Toronto Falcons.

In 1969, he played in the American Soccer League with Rochester Lancers. The following season he served as a player-coach with the Serbian White Eagles in the National Soccer League. For the remainder of the 1970 season he played with Toronto Croatia. He assisted Croatia in securing the Canadian Open Cup by defeating Vancouver Eintracht in 1971. In 1972, he served as a player-coach on an interim basis for Toronto Croatia until the arrival of Gordan Irović.

== International career ==
Harvey made his debut for the Canada national team on 6 October 1968 against Bermuda in a World Cup qualifier match.
