= Marijan Bilić =

Croatian footballer

Personal information
- Place of birth: Croatia, Yugoslavia
- Height: 1.73 m (5 ft 8 in)
- Position: Defender

Senior career*
Years	Team	Apps	(Gls)
1954–1967	Dinamo Zagreb		
1969–1974	Toronto Croatia		
1977	Toronto Metros-Croatia		

Managerial career
- 1970: Toronto Croatia
- 1975: Toronto Metros-Croatia (interim)
- 1976: Toronto Metros-Croatia (interim)
- * Club domestic league appearances and goals

Marijan Bilić is a Croatian retired footballer who played in the Yugoslav First League, National Soccer League, and North American Soccer League.

== Playing career ==
Bilić played in the Yugoslav First League with Dinamo Zagreb in 1967. In 1969, he played with Toronto Croatia in the National Soccer League, where he was given the captaincy. He assisted in winning the NSL Championship in 1971, and 1974. In 1977, Toronto Metro's signed Bilić to a playing contract.

== Managerial career ==
In July 1970, he was named the player-coach for Toronto Croatia. In 1975, he briefly served as an interim coach for the Toronto Metros-Croatia in the North American Soccer League, where he managed a 13–9 record. After the dismissal of Ivan Markovic as head coach in 1976 he returned to the coaching position, where he appointed Domagoj Kapetanović as his tactician and eventual successor.
