= Željko Bilecki =

Canadian soccer player (1950–2023)

Personal information
- Date of birth: April 28, 1950
- Place of birth: Zagreb, PR Croatia, FPR Yugoslavia
- Date of death: April 26, 2023 (aged 72)
- Place of death: Toronto, Canada
- Position: Goalkeeper

Youth career
- 1969: Toronto Croatia

Senior career*
Years	Team	Apps	(Gls)
1970–1974	Toronto Croatia		
1975–1978	Toronto Metros-Croatia	66	(0)
1979–1980	Tampa Bay Rowdies	18	(0)
1979–1980	Tampa Bay Rowdies (indoor)	12	(0)
1980	Los Angeles Aztecs	1	(0)
1980–1981	Los Angeles Aztecs (indoor)	18	(0)
1980–1983	Tulsa Roughnecks (indoor)	2	(0)
1981–1982	Tulsa Roughnecks	29	(0)

International career
1976–1977	Canada	3	(0)
- * Club domestic league appearances and goals

Željko Bilecki (April 28, 1950 – April 26, 2023) was a Canadian soccer player who played as a goalkeeper.

== Club career ==
Bilecki played at youth level with Toronto Croatia's junior team in 1969. In 1970, he played in the National Soccer League with Toronto Croatia's senior team. He was named the league's top goalkeeper twice in 1971, and 1972. In 1974, he assisted in securing the NSL Championship against Toronto Homer. For the 1975 season he played in the North American Soccer League with Toronto Metros-Croatia.

He later played for three other NASL sides in the United States: Tampa Bay Rowdies, Los Angeles Aztecs and Tulsa Roughnecks. He won a Soccer Bowl with Toronto in 1976 and was a runner-up in 1979 for Tampa Bay. He was the back up goalie for Tulsa when they won Soccer Bowl '83. Bilecki also won the NASL's indoor title in 1979–80 with Tampa Bay.

== International career ==
Bilecki made his debut for Canada on December 22, 1976, in a 3–0 victory against the United States in a World Cup qualification match in Port-au-Prince. He won two more caps the next year, the last of these coming in a 2–1 win over Suriname on October 12, 1977, in Mexico City, where he came on at the start of the second half to replace Tony Chursky.

== Death ==
Bilecki died on April 26, 2023, four days after the death of his mother.
