= Bruno Pilaš =

Yugoslavian footballer (1950–2011)

Personal information
- Date of birth: 21 November 1950
- Place of birth: Zagreb, PR Croatia, FPR Yugoslavia
- Date of death: 11 June 2011 (aged 60)
- Place of death: Oakville, Canada
- Position: Striker

Senior career*
Years	Team	Apps	(Gls)
1969–1970	Dinamo Zagreb	0	(0)
1971–1972	Toronto Croatia		
1973–1977	Toronto Metros-Croatia	78	(19)

Managerial career
- 1987: Toronto Croatia
- 1993: Toronto Italia
- 2001: Toronto Croatia
- * Club domestic league appearances and goals

Bruno Pilaš (21 November 1950 – 11 June 2011) was a Yugoslavian professional footballer who played as a striker in the NASL between 1973 and 1977 for the Toronto Metros-Croatia.

== Club career ==
Before he arrived in North America, he began his career in 1969 with Dinamo Zagreb. In 1971, he went abroad to play in the National Soccer League (NSL) with Toronto Croatia, where he won the NSL Championship.

== Coaching career ==
In 1977, due to chronic injuries, he retired from professional football and embarked upon a coaching career where he managed Toronto Croatia several times in the Canadian Professional Soccer League. In 1987, he served as the head coach for Toronto Croatia in the National Soccer League. In 1993, he managed NSL rivals Toronto Italia.

After a year's absence, Pilaš returned as head coach for the Croats in 2001. Once the season concluded, he was nominated for the league's coach of the year.
