= Alija Solak =

Bosnian footballer

Personal information
- Date of birth: 1942 (age 83–84)
- Place of birth: Bosnia and Herzegovina, Yugoslavia
- Height: 5 ft 8 in (1.73 m)
- Position: Left wing

Senior career*
Years	Team	Apps	(Gls)
1963–1969	Famos Hrasnica		
1970–1974	Toronto Croatia		
1975	Toronto Metros-Croatia	6	(1)
- * Club domestic league appearances and goals

Alija Solak or Aleja Solak (born 1944) is a Bosnian retired footballer who played in the National Soccer League, and the North American Soccer League.

== Playing career ==
Solak began playing football in 1963 with FK Famos Hrasnica in the Yugoslav Second League. In 1969, he arrived to Canada and was recruited by Toronto Croatia to play in the National Soccer League from 1970 till 1974. In his debut season with Toronto he finished as the club's top goal scorer with 23 goals. In 1971, he assisted Croatia in winning the Canadian Open Cup by recording a goal against Vancouver Eintracht. Throughout his tenure with Toronto he won the NSL Championship in 1971, and 1974.

After Croatia joined the North American Soccer League as the Toronto Metros-Croatia in 1975 he appeared in six matches and recorded one goal. He made his debut on May 23, 1975 against Philadelphia Atoms. He also played in the Kitchener and District Soccer League.

== International career ==
Solak was called to the Canada men's national soccer team camp by head coach Frank Pike in 1973. He was selected for the Canadian select team in a match against Arsenal F.C.
