= Vladimir Šimunić =

Croatian footballer and manager

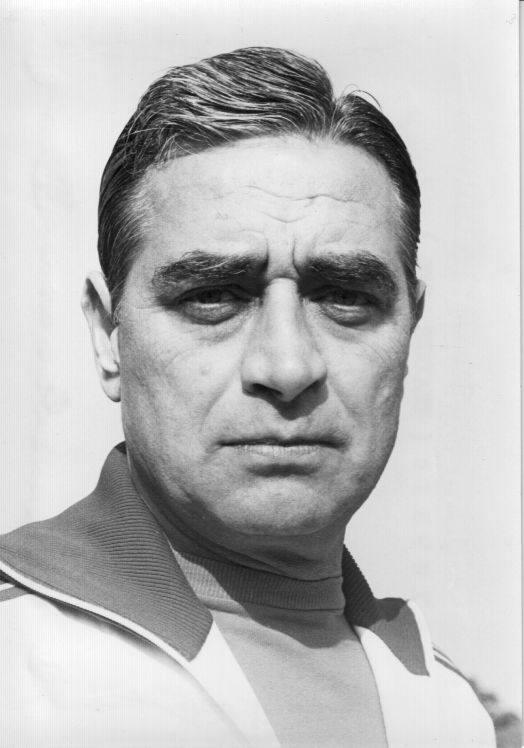

Personal information
- Date of birth: 19 May 1919
- Place of birth: Pula, Kingdom of Italy
- Date of death: 24 December 1993 (aged 74)
- Position: Goalkeeper

Senior career*
Years	Team	Apps	(Gls)
1936–1943	HŠK Građanski Zagreb		

International career
1942	Independent State of Croatia	1	(0)

Managerial career
- 1961–1968: Maribor
- 1969–1970: Grazer AK
- 1973: Borac Banja Luka
- 1972–1973: Toronto Croatia
- 1974: Toronto Croatia
- * Club domestic league appearances and goals

Vladimir Šimunić (19 May 1919 – 24 December 1993) was a Croatian footballer and manager.

== Career ==
Šimunić played with HŠK Građanski Zagreb in the Yugoslav First League as a goalkeeper from 1936 until 1943. He also made an appearance under the flag of the Independent State of Croatia, a World War II-era puppet state of Nazi Germany, on 14 June 1942 against Hungary.

Following his retirement from professional football he was appointed the head coach for NK Maribor in 1961, where he captured the Yugoslav Second League title in the 1966–67 season. In 1969, he went abroad to manage Grazer AK, and returned to Yugoslavia in 1973 to coach FK Borac Banja Luka. In 1972, he went to Canada to manage the National Soccer League side Toronto Croatia. In June 1974, he returned to manage Toronto Croatia and won the NSL Championship.
