= Lapovo =

Lapovo Лапово (Serbian)
- Town and municipality
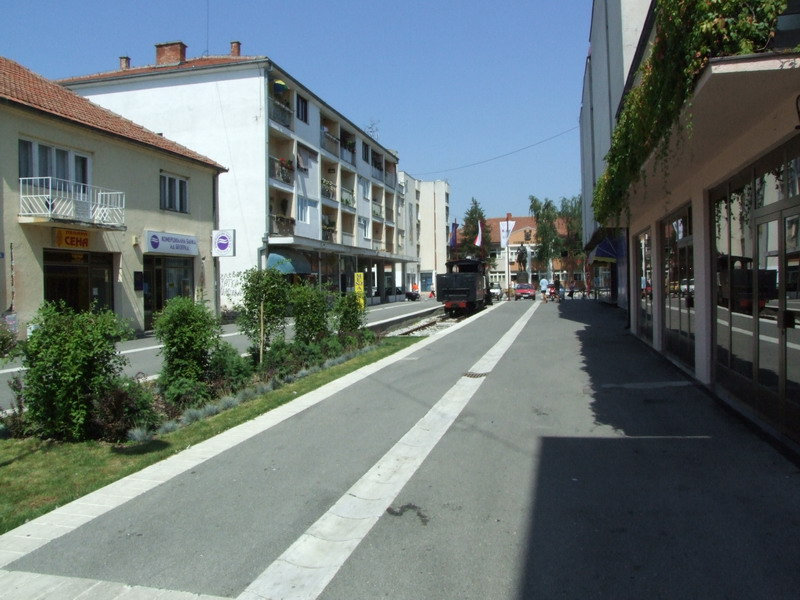
- Town center

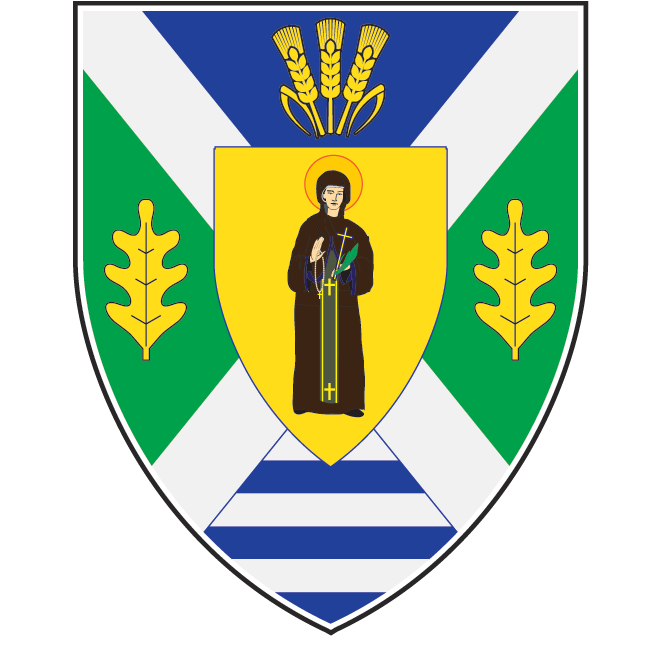
- Coat of arms

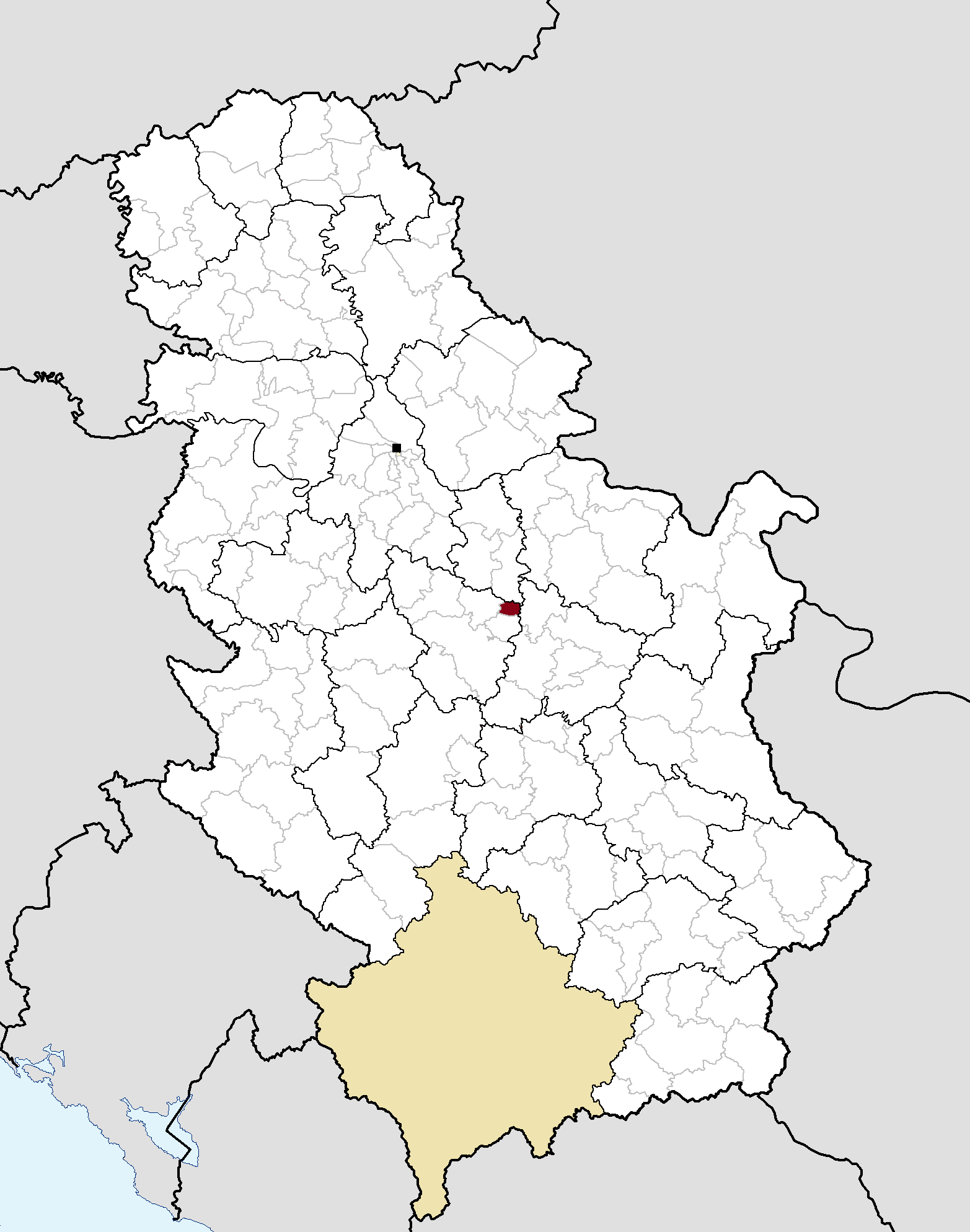
- Location of the municipality of Lapovo within Serbia
- Coordinates: 44°11′N 21°06′E
- Country: Serbia
- Region: Šumadija and Western Serbia
- District: Šumadija
- Settlements: 2

Government
  - Mayor: Boban Miličić (SNS)

Area
  - Municipality: 55 km^{2} (21 sq mi)
- Elevation: 105 m (344 ft)

Population (2022 census)
  - Town: 6,057
  - Municipality: 6,582
- Time zone: UTC+1 (CET)
  - Summer (DST): UTC+2 (CEST)
- Postal code: 34220
- Area code: +381(0)34
- Car plates: KG
- Website: www.lapovo.rs

Lapovo (Serbian Cyrillic: Лапово) is a town and municipality located in the Šumadija District of central Serbia. The population of the town is 6,057 according to the 2022 census.

== History ==
The first mention of Lapovo dates from the 12th century when Stefan Nemanja conquered the region of Lepenica from Bizanthy.

More accurate information about Lapovo's existence came after the Battle of Kosovo in 1389 while duke Mihailo or Mihalj was running the estate in today's region of Lapovo.

The Charter of Princess Milica from 1395 mentions landed property of Duke Mihajlo in Hlapova plain, Lapovo today, on the basis of which it can be concluded that Lapovo is a village which has a medieval origin. After the liberation from the Turks, a rapid development of Lapovo began, primarily thanks to its favourable geostrategic position. In 1896 Lapovo was declared for the town by decree of King Aleksandar Obrenovic. Municipality of Lapovo is located at Corridor 10, at the intersection of highway Belgrade-Nis. Lapovo also represents one of the most important railway hubs, on the railway line Belgrade-Nis-Athens. Lapovo is currently in a phase of economical development, which is accompanied by the appearance of a large number of national and foreign investors.

== Demographics ==
Historical population
Year	Pop.	±% p.a.
1948	7,819	—
1953	8,255	+1.09%
1961	8,850	+0.87%
1971	9,156	+0.34%
1981	9,631	+0.51%
1991	9,480	−0.16%
2002	8,228	−1.28%
2011	7,837	−0.54%
2022	6,582	−1.57%

== Settlements ==
Lapovo consists of two settlements: Lapovo Varoš and Lapovos Selo

== Economy ==
The Lapovo industrial zone has been formed between international highway A1 motorway and railroad tracks, 108 kilometres (67 miles) from Belgrade. Quadrature of the zone is approximately 80 hectares (200 acres) with possibility of further enlargement.

The following table gives a preview of total number of employed people per their core activity (as of 2017):

Activity	Total
Agriculture, forestry and fishing	11
Mining	1
Processing industry	611
Distribution of power, gas and water	14
Distribution of water and water waste management	84
Construction	9
Wholesale and retail, repair	201
Traffic, storage and communication	450
Hotels and restaurants	35
Media and telecommunications	4
Finance and insurance	4
Property stock and charter	-
Professional, scientific, innovative and technical activities	36
Administrative and other services	20
Administration and social assurance	69
Education	83
Healthcare and social work	99
Art, leisure and recreation	12
Other services	22
Total	1,766

== Notable people ==
- Momčilo Stojanović

== Gallery ==
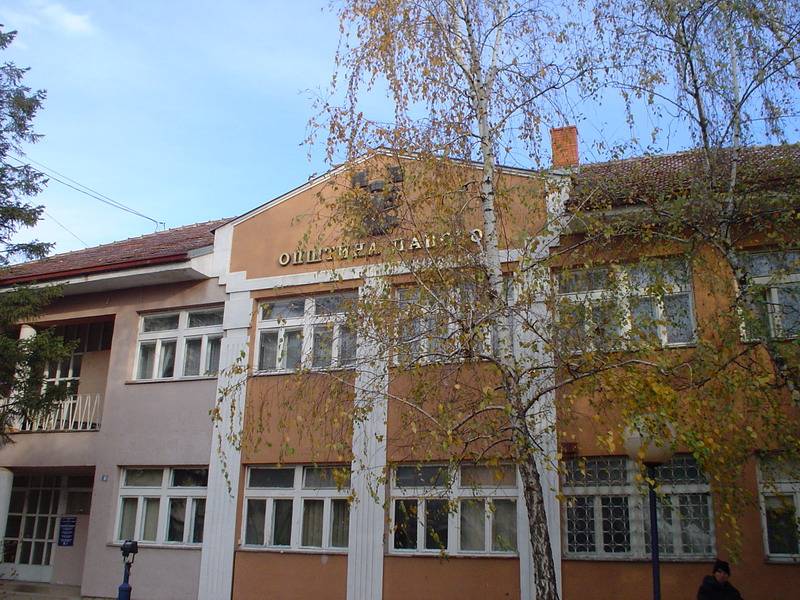
Lapovo City Hall

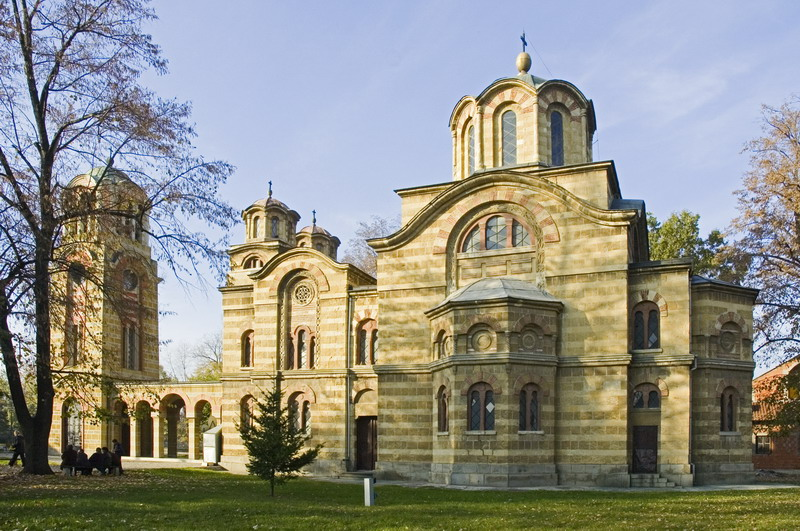
St. Paraskeve church

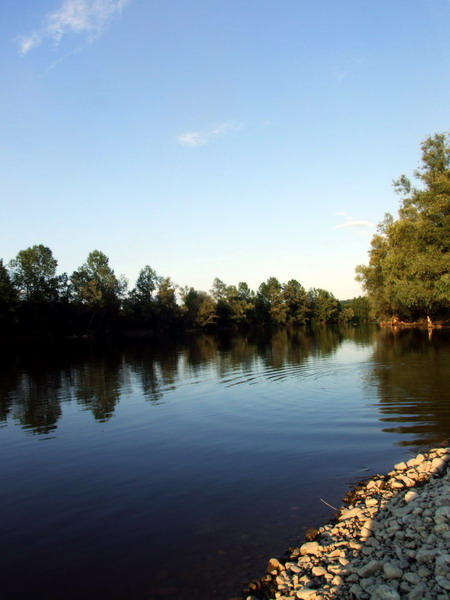
Morava river

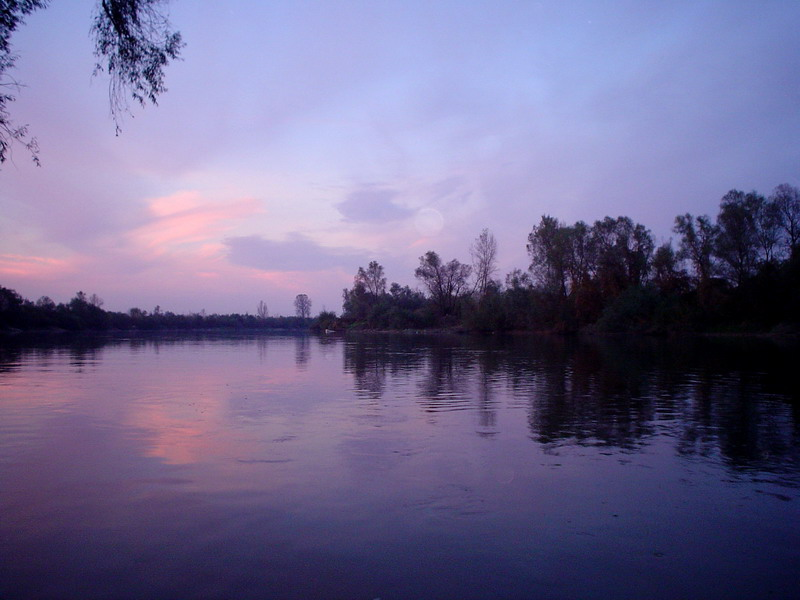
Morava river
