= Toronto Croatia =

Canadian soccer team

- Full name: Croatian National Sports Club Toronto Croatia
- Founded: 1956; 70 years ago
- Stadium: Paramount Fine Foods Centre
- Chairman: Josip Pavicic
- Manager: Milodrag Akmadzic
- Coach: Josip Keran
- League: Arena Soccer
Home colours	Away colours

C.N.S.C. Toronto Croatia (Croatian National Sports Club Toronto Croatia) is a Canadian soccer team based in Toronto, Ontario, that plays in the Supergroup Open Division in the Canadian Academy of Football. The team's colours are red, white and blue, similar to those of the Croatia national team.

The club was founded in 1956 by the Croatian diaspora in Toronto. Initially the team played in various local amateur leagues before making the transition to the professional ranks by joining the Canadian National Soccer League (CNSL) in 1962. In 1975, after a period of dominance in the CNSL, the organization purchased the Toronto Metros of the North American Soccer League and retained their heritage by inserting Croatia into the team's name. Their greatest success occurred in the 1976 season, where Toronto captured the Soccer Bowl. The 1976 team was later inducted into the Canadian Soccer Hall of Fame.

In 1979 the club sold its share to Global Television Network and returned to the CNSL. Toronto Croatia became a founding member of the Canadian International Soccer League in 1994, returned to the CNSL in 1997, and the following year became a charter member of the Canadian Professional Soccer League (later the Canadian Soccer League [CSL]). They established themselves as an elite club with a league record of six championships. The team has been among the most-successful clubs in Canadian soccer history, and one of the most-successful Croatian diaspora clubs. Toronto Croatia has a noted historical rivalry with the Serbian White Eagles.

== History ==
=== Early years (1956–1967) ===
Croatian National Sports Club Toronto Croatia was formed by the Croatian diaspora in Toronto, Ontario on October 5, 1956 in order to foster closer links with the homeland by promoting organized sporting events and competitions. The original founders of the club were Kreso Mance, Franjo Jurisic, and Juraj Boljkovac who served as the club's first president. Vlado Romanov was selected as the inaugural head coach, while Mance was appointed the first team captain. The club originally competed in the Metro Toronto League, and made its debut against Belfast United. During the club's fledgeling years the team saw little on-field success with their biggest achievement occurring in the 1959 season, when Toronto Croatia participated in the Continental Soccer League and claimed the Continental Cup after defeating Germania by a score of 2–1.

In the 1960s the club received support from club president Nikola Baric, the Croatian community, and Rev. Dragutin Kamber's Croatian parishioners, and the club began to develop into a solid team. Toronto Croatia joined the Toronto and District League in 1960, where they played for two seasons, then transitioned to the professional Canadian National Soccer League (CNSL) in 1962. After several mediocre seasons Toronto Croatia reached the championship finals in the 1966 season, finishing second to Windsor Teutonia.

=== National Soccer League success (1970–1975) ===
Having established themselves as a NSL-title contender, Toronto Croatia began attracting talent from the SFR Yugoslavia. They also hired I. Kezman, a professional head coach from Europe. Among the influx of players were Alan Harvey, Rudolf Milicevic, Najrudin Jazic, Jerko Granic, Osvaldo Gonzales, Harry de Vlugt, Lutz Wolansky, Aleja Solak, and Marijan Bilic. Kezman resigned after a lacklustre start to the 1970 season and was replaced by Arthur Rodrigues and Jure Sikic. Under this management the team won the regular season title but was defeated in the championship final by Hamilton Croatia.

Significant additions were brought in for the 1971 season with the arrival of former Dinamo Zagreb head coach Ivan Jazbinšek and Dinamo alumni Bruno Pilaš, Marijan Bradvic, and Zlatko Mesić. Under the leadership of Jazbinšek the team claimed its first treble by winning the regular season title, NSL Championship, and the Croatian-North American Soccer Tournament. At the conclusion of the season the league awarded Željko Bilecki with its Top Goaltender award.

For the 1972 season Vladimir Šimunić replaced Jazbinšek and helped secure another regular-season title and the NSL Cup, while Bilecki received his second Goalkeeper of the Year award. Notable players brought in from abroad included Joško Gluić and Ante Ivković. Šimunić continued with the team for two more seasons, which saw Toronto Croatia win a fourth-consecutive regular-season title in 1973 and a second NSL Championship in 1974.

=== North American Soccer League years (1975–1978) ===
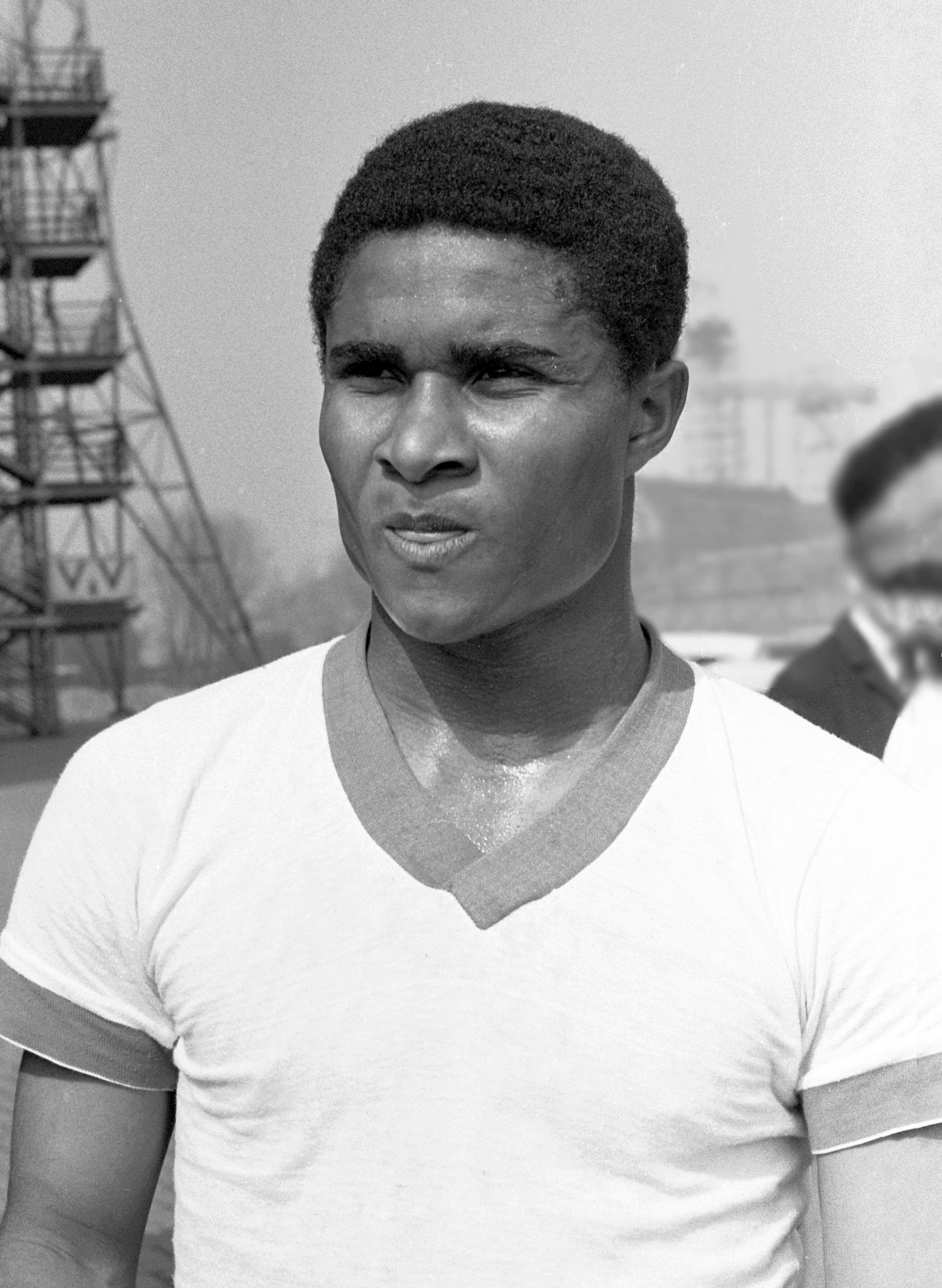
Portuguese international Eusébio was instrumental in winning the Soccer Bowl '76 for Toronto Metros-Croatia

In 1975 the club purchased the Toronto Metros of the North American Soccer League to form Toronto Metros-Croatia, while still retaining a reserve team in the NSL. During this period the team attracted many soccer stars, such as Portuguese superstar Eusébio, and were successful enough that they won Soccer Bowl '76 – in a 3–0 victory over the Minnesota Kicks – at the Kingdome in Seattle. The squad was originally led by Ivan Marković, but after a heated confrontation with Eusébio he decided to resign. His immediate replacement was former-player Marijan Bilić as an interim coach, and a suitable successor was found in Domagoj Kapetanović, an immigrant to Canada who had played for Dinamo Zagreb. The champions' team was: Paolo Cimpiel, Tadeusz Polak, Željko Bilecki, Ivan Lukačević, Robert Iarusci, Eusébio, Mladen Cukon, Carmen Marcantonio, Ivair Ferreira, Wolfgang Sühnholz, Damir Sutevski, Ivica Grnja, Filip Blašković and Chris Horrocks.

However, the NASL was never comfortable with the Croatia link (an obvious ethnic connection). League executives lobbied CBS to ensure they were only referred to as "Toronto" in the televised coverage of Soccer Bowl. In 1978, the team was bought out, leaving the Toronto Blizzard in the NASL, while Toronto Croatia returned to the NSL. The club's successes, despite the instabilities it found in each of the leagues in which it had played, showed what a small ethnic group could accomplish in the North American sport. The 1976 team was inducted into the Canadian Soccer Hall of Fame as its 2010 Team of Distinction.

=== Return to NSL and Puma League (1979–1997) ===
In 1983 the club entered a new national league, the Canadian Professional Soccer League (CPSL). This league comprised six teams from across Canada (Edmonton, Montreal, etc.) and initially got off to a strong start. The team was entered as Mississauga Croatia and played its games at Centennial Park Stadium. Due to spiralling costs and poor attendance across the league, two of the teams folded and the league disbanded following a winner-takes-all final. Toronto Croatia returned to the NSL.

Towards the late 1980s, many players and coaches were brought over from Croatia to help elevate the team and its youth programs. Some of the notable players and managers arriving at that time were Drago Šantić (Sibenik), Velimir Crljen (Zadar), Dubravko Ledić (Mostar), and Mišo Smajlović.

The early 1990s saw the team rise to prominence in the community once again as the Croatian War of Independence had begun in the homeland. This activity culminated in a trip to Croatia sponsored by the Croatian Ministry of Sports and Culture, featuring Toronto against Dinamo Zagreb, Hajduk Split, Osijek, Rijeka, Varazdin, and Tomislavgrad. As in the early 1970s, the team became a symbol for the Croatian diaspora community in coming together and campaigning for official recognition for the homeland. At this time, the NSL was beginning to see an elevated level of play, and the attendance at all league games was beginning to rise. Toronto Croatia consistently had the largest attendance of all teams in the league during this era (1990–1995).

With numerous players brought in from Croatia including Josip Lukacevic, Ivan Simic, Goran Pavlic, Mate Stanic, Robert Rupcic and the local youth system providing young talent (Joe Buntic, Frank Delisimunovic, Rob Milek, Anton Granic), the team won the NSL SuperCup and Croatian North American Soccer tournament. Following these successes were PUMA League Championship wins in 1992 and 1995. During both of those seasons, Toronto Croatia won both the League and Croatian National Tournament for North America. During the PUMA league era, Velimir Crljen, Goran Grubesic, Frank Delisimunovic and Anton Granic were voted to the All Star team).

In 1995, Toronto Croatia departed from the CNSL after a dispute with Toronto Italia over alleged debts owned to the club. As a result Toronto Croatia joined the newly formed Canadian International Soccer League, which had sponsorship from Puma. Though the Puma League was a short-lived experiment Toronto Croatia managed to win the league in two consecutive seasons. After the Puma League folded Toronto Croatia, along with Kosova Albanians and Hamilton White Eagles, rejoined the CNSL in 1997. The club continued its tradition of recruiting high-profile Croatian managers from abroad by assigning coaching duties to Zlatko Haramincic. In their return season to the CNSL they finished as runners up in the regular season, which subsequently secured the team a postseason berth. They were eliminated in the preliminary round of the playoffs after 8–1 defeat on goals on aggregate to Toronto Supra.

=== Founding member of the CPSL and average success (1998–2005) ===
After years of feuding between the Ontario Soccer Association and the CNSL both parties decided to reconcile their differences in 1998 by forming the new Canadian Professional Soccer League. The project was an attempt to form an exclusively Canadian league, beginning with an Ontario Division. Toronto Croatia became a founding member along with Glen Shields, London City, Mississauga Eagles, North York Astros, St. Catharines Wolves, Toronto Olympians, and York Region Shooters. In preparation for their CPSL debut the club brought in former Dinamo Zagreb manager Rudolf Belin and signed new additions due to the retirement of several key players. They made their CPSL debut on June 3, 1998 in a Canada Cup match against Glen Shields, where they were defeated 3–1 with Stephen Warren providing their only goal. The season was a setback as they finished at the bottom of the standings and failed to advance past their group stage in the Canada Cup tournament.

In 1999 changes were made in Toronto Croatia's managerial department with the appointment of Bruno Pilaš as head coach. Pilaš was able to challenge the Toronto Olympians for the league championship, finishing the season as runners up with the third-highest offensive and defensive record. The club also had a solid Canada Cup tournament, losing the finals 3–0 to the Olympians. In the preliminary round of the postseason Toronto defeated Glen Shields 5–2. In the CPSL Championship final they lost again to the Olympians, who achieved a treble that season. At the conclusion of the season George Azcurra was named the Goalkeeper of the Year.

From 2000 season Velimir Crljen became head coach and Milodrag Akmadzic Backo assistant coach and player. After that in next 15 years (with small breaks) they won many trophies. It was the most successful part of the history. Since 2006 president of the club is Josip Pavicic, also having successful entrepreneurial career. Since 2010 manager is Ivan Kulis. With home players they brought some players from Croatian first and second division. Though Toronto failed in repeating their previous season performance they achieved a postseason berth by finishing third in the standings with the league's second-best offensive and defensive records. Toronto Croatia won their Canada Cup tournament group and advanced to the semifinals, where they were defeated by the Olympians in a 3–2 penalty shootout. Their playoff run began with a 3–1 victory over St. Catharines, advancing to the CPSL Championship final where they again faced the Toronto Olympians. This time Croatia avenged their previous defeats with the Draganic brothers producing goals for a 2–1 championship victory which denied the Olympians back-to-back trebles.

Bruno Pilaš returned as head coach for the 2001 season, when the club relocated to Streetsville, Mississauga to play at Memorial Park, where Mayor Hazel McCallion performed the ceremonial kickoff. Toronto Croatia finished three points shy of a postseason berth and was unable to defend the championship. They likewise failed to advance past their group stage at the Canada Cup tournament. Though the season was an overall failure for Toronto, it was the final occasion as a member of the CPSL that the club would fail to qualify for the postseason. On a positive note George Azcurra received his second Goalkeeper of the Year award.

In 2002, as a result of an increase in teams, the CPSL split the league with Croatia placed in the Western Conference. Zarko Brala managed the squad for the majority of the 2002 season, competing with the Mississauga Olympians for the Conference title, but was discharged on September 9. His dismissal came following the team's defeat in the annual Croatian-North American Soccer Tournament, in which he placed his son, back-up goalkeeper Anthony Brala, into the starting line-up instead of George Azcurra. This brought a negative reaction from the Croatian community, which prompted team president Mario Skara to relive him of his duties. Brala's immediate replacement was former head coach Drago Santic, who had helped the team capture the Puma League title in 1996. Under the guidance of Santic the team won the Western Conference title and achieved a six-game undefeated streak. The team also finished second in the Canada Cup tournament, losing 1–0 to the Ottawa Wizards. However they performed poorly in the playoffs, with a defeat to the North York Astros in the preliminary round. Toronto Croatia had the second-best defensive record in the league, with Azcurra recognized as Goalkeeper of the Year and Domagoj Sain as Defender of the Year.

Toronto Croatia began the 2003 season with a devastating streak of five defeats and an early departure from the Open Canada Cup with a 4–2 loss to Toronto Supra. As a result Santic was relieved from his coaching duties and Velemir Crljen returned in his previous capacity as player-coach. To improve the team's situation, Crljen used the club's overseas connections to bring in players including Josip Juric, Antonijo Zupan, Jure Pavic, Ivica Raguz, and Ante Pavlovic. These additions helped the team recover and finish third in their conference, gaining a postseason berth. In the first round of the playoffs they defeated the Brampton Hitmen 4–3 in a penalty shootout. However this result was overturned by the league after Brampton filed a protest that two suspended Croatian officials had overseen the match. At the conclusion of the season Domagoj Sain received his second Defender of the Year award.

Aldo Krajcar served as head coach for the 2004 season in which the club won another CPSL Championship. They achieved a second-place finish in the Western Conference followed by a 5–0 victory over the Windsor Border Stars in the first round of the postseason. The club was required to play a wildcard match against the Brampton Hitmen, avenging their previous playoff encounter with a score of 3–1. Croatia defeated Western Conference champions Hamilton Thunder 2–0, and in the finals beat the Vaughan Shooters 4–0 with Marasovic, Marko Milicevic, and Zupan scoring the goals.

Crljen returned for his third term as head coach in 2005, with the team acquiring Caribbean talent Hayden Fitzwilliams, Caswain Mason, and Halburto Harris. Toronto Croatia was transferred to the Eastern Conference, over which they battled with Vaughan for supremacy, with Vaughan finishing as champions. In the first round of the postseason they beat Laval Dynamites with Leo Laurito scoring the winning goal. Croatia faced North York Astros in a wildcard round, where player-coach Crljen secured the match 1–0 with an overtime goal. In the second round they lost to Vaughan Shooters, 4–0, failing to defend their championship.

=== International Division and rebirth of Croatia–Serbia rivalry (2006–2009) ===
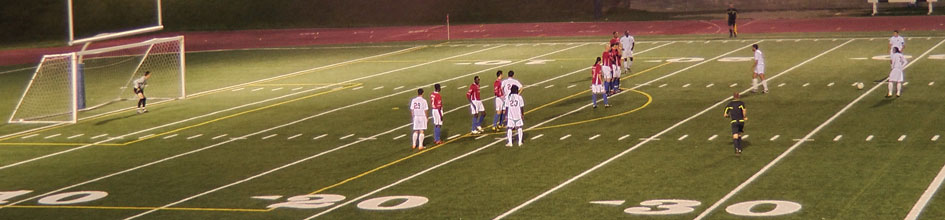
Toronto Croatia playing against Serbian White Eagles at Centennial Park Stadium during the 2010 season.

In 2006 the CPSL re-branded itself as the Canadian Soccer League (CSL), and introduced the International Division which represented the various ethnic communities in the Greater Toronto Area. The launch of the division saw the return of Toronto Croatia's traditional rivals, the Serbian White Eagles, which revived their historical derby match. The club also celebrated its 50th anniversary, and went on a tour of Croatia and Bosnia and Herzegovina where they played the Dinamo Zagreb B team at Maksimir Stadium before the Croatian Supercup, and also played NK Široki Brijeg and NK Primorac Biograd. The organization retained the services of Josip Cvitanovic as club president, and Theo Krajacic as club representative. After gaining coaching experience in Croatia and Asia, former player-coach Mladen Pralija returned to manage the team. The 2006 International Division season was primarily a battle between the two former-Yugoslavian represented teams, which produced the highest attendances throughout the league. The regular season concluded with the White Eagles claiming the division with Croatia finishing as runners up. In the postseason Croatia beat Laval 1–0 but were defeated in the semifinals 1–0 by Italia Shooters. Toronto Croatia's Azcurra was named the Goalkeeper of the Year for a fifth time, which was a league record for an individual player.

2007 season Milodrag Akmadzic Backo became the coach. Prior to the 2007 season the team moved to the Hershey Centre after the league banned the use of Memorial Park. The team won the inaugural Croatian World Club Championship, a tournament for the Croatian diaspora clubs throughout the world, with a 3–1 victory over Canberra Croatia in the final. Team veteran Domagoj Sain was recognized as the tournament's MVP. The team was awarded the championship trophy by Croatian Football Federation president Vlatko Marković.

In the regular season Croatia continued their battle with the White Eagles over the primacy of the International Division, a rivalry which helped increase attendance throughout the CSL. Though Croatia achieved an unbeaten streak with only one defeat they fell short of Serbia by four points in the division. In the postseason Toronto Croatia defeated North York Astros 4–2, and beat National Division titleholders St. Catharines Wolves 3–2 with goals by Fitzwilliams, Tihomir Maletic and an own goal by Wolves. In the CSL championship finals their rivalry with Serbia reached its climax; lacking an adequate stadium available in order to separate the fans the league was forced to change the format to a two-leg game rather than the standard knockout. In the two-game final Croatia defeated the White Eagles by a score of 4–1 goals on aggregate. At the CSL awards banquet team captain Sain became first player to win Defender of the Year a third time, and Maletic was voted Rookie of the Year.

In 2008 Croatia went through a transitional period as many core veterans like Azcurra, Leo Marasovic, Robert Fran, Rudi Spaic, and Robert Grnja retired from competitive soccer. Former Prva HNL manager Miroslav Buljan was hired for the 2008 season and strengthened the roster with the additions of Tonći Pirija and Hugo Herrera. The league introduced the creation of a reserve division to provide a developmental platform for young players to transition to the professional ranks and Toronto Croatia added a reserve squad. Their on-field performance was mediocre as they finished third in the International Division. Their postseason was cut short after losing to 2–1 to Portugal FC in the preliminary round.

As the CSL received sanctioning from the Canadian Soccer Association in 2009, Toronto Croatia formed a partnership with Clarkson Sheridan Soccer Club to jointly develop youth players. Before the start of the season the club moved to Centennial Park Stadium in the Toronto district of Etobicoke, as the Hershey Centre did not meet the standards of a professional facility. During the regular season Toronto continued its annual rivalry with the White Eagles for the division title, where ultimately Serbia claimed the title with Croatia behind by one point. In the opening round of the playoffs they faced the Brampton Lions and won 4–1 points in aggregate, but subsequently lost in the semifinals to Serbia.

=== League powerhouse and departure to CAF (2010–present) ===
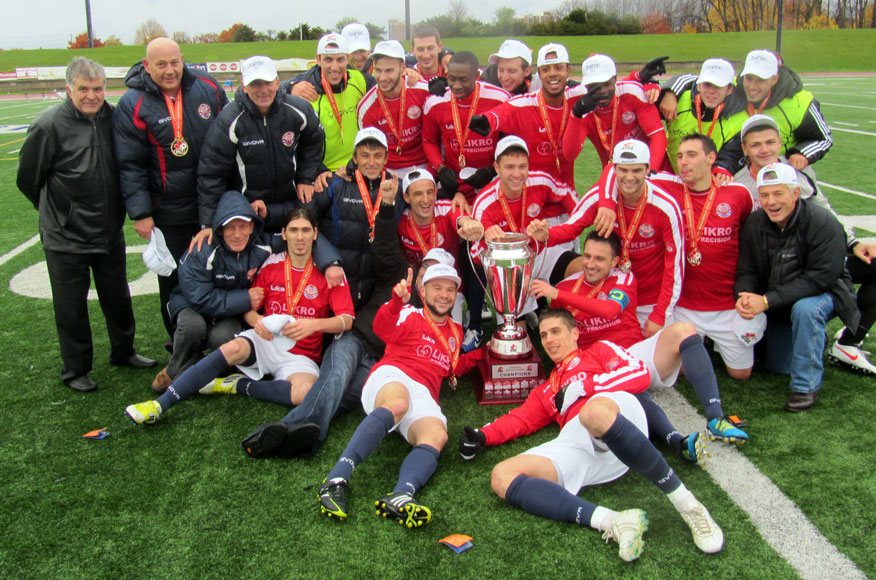
Toronto Croatia celebrating CSL Championship in 2012

Prior to the start of the 2010 season Crljen was relieved as coach and replaced by Kreso Grnjto. The team recruited players from overseas including Ivan Žgela and Ante Zurak. Further changes saw the promotion of club secretary Pino Jazbec to the CSL Executive Committee as League Administrator. The CSL administration also restructured the league by combining both the International and National Divisions to form the CSL First Division with a single-table structure. The regular season was unremarkable for Toronto Croatia as the team barely qualified for the playoffs. In the opening round of the postseason Croatia achieved an upset victory against regular-season champions York Region Shooters, winning 3–1 on goals on aggregate. However Toronto then lost 2–0 in the semifinals against Hamilton Croatia. At the conclusion of the season Tihomir Maletic won both the CSL Golden Boot and MVP.

Veteran head coach Crljen was hired to lead the team for the 2011 season, in which the club saw a return to prominence. Toronto Croatia finished second in the regular season with the best defensive record and the second-best offensive record. At the international level they achieved their second Croatian World Club Championship. In the preliminary round of the playoffs they defeated Mississauga Eagles FC 8–1 on goals on aggregate. In the following round Croatia defeated the York Region Shooters 2–0 with goals by Josip Keran and Fitzwilliams. In the finals a goal by Fitzwilliams secured a 1–0 victory over Capital City F.C., winning Toronto Croatia the CSL Championship. At the conclusion of the season Croatia went home with the majority of the CSL team awards, and Crljen was recognized as Coach of the Year. Maletic received his second-consecutive MVP award and Sven Arapovic was given Defender of the Year. Club president Joe Pavicic received the Harry Paul Gauss award for his allegiance, commitment and support to the league and its member clubs.

In 2012 Croatia produced another solid season with the club investing in foreign talent from Croatia by acquiring former 1. HNL and 2. HNL veterans like Josip Bonacin, Andelo Srzentic, Dino Buljan, and Marin Vucemilovic-Grgic. The club achieved their first regular-season title since 2002 and the best offensive and defensive records, with only one loss throughout the season. In the postseason they defeated Niagara United 2–0 and rival White Eagles 4–0. In the championship finals Croatia successfully defended their title by defeating Montreal Impact Academy 1–0 with Vucemilovic-Grgic sealing the match for Toronto. After attaining a prosperous season the league recognized Vucemilovic-Grgic as MVP and Antonio Ilic as Goalkeeper of the Year.

On September 13, 2012 CBC News released an article with wiretap evidence which revealed a bribe in the order of €15,000 (CA$18,000) was paid to Antonijo Zupan, who was to share it with other players on his team. According to the report, monies were paid to fix at least one CSL match, on September 12, 2009, v Trois-Rivières Attak. Zupan denied any knowledge of receiving any money for fixing a match. In response to the allegations of match fixing the CSL issued a statement stating that the league would continue to conduct the necessary steps in order to prevent any future tampering of matches.

During 2013–2015 Croatia's continued to dominate the CSL, finishing in the top three each year, winning the championship in 2015 and finishing as runners up in 2014. The club returned to the Hershey Centre in 2014, due to renovations of Centennial Park Stadium in preparation for the 2015 Pan American Games. Toronto Croatia began reinvesting in their youth structure in 2013 by relaunching their reserve team, which secured the Second Division regular season title and were runners up in the championship. Due to this immediate success the reserve team formed an affiliation with Ferenc Puskás Football Academy, and HNK Rijeka Academy. In 2014, the club released a documentary which detailed the history of the organization.

In 2016 Toronto Croatia departed from the CSL and became a founding member in the LIKA SUPERGROUP Open Division in the Canadian Academy of Futbol (CAF), an academy player developmental league. Coach was Josip Keran.

Since 2017 Croatia Toronto compete in National Arena Soccer League. Both seasons they were first on the end of the season. President is Josip Pavicic, coach Milodrag Akmadzic Backo, assistant coach Zoran Marijanovic.

== Year-by-year ==
Year	Division	League	Regular season	Play-offs
1962	2	NSL	11th	
1963	2	NSL	7th	
1964	2	NSL	7th	
1965	2	NSL	7th	
1966	2	NSL	5th	Final
1967	2	NSL	10th	
1968	2	NSL	6th	Quarter-Finals
1969	2	NSL	7th	were not played
1970	2	NSL	1st	Final
1971	2	NSL	1st	Champions
1972	2	NSL	1st	
1973	2	NSL	1st	Final
1974	2	NSL	3rd	Champions
1975	1 – Northern Division	NASL	2nd	Quarter-Finals
1976	1 – Atlantic Conference, Northern Division	NASL	2nd	Champions
1977	1 – Atlantic Conference, Northern Division	NASL	1st, Atlantic, Northern	Quarter-Finals
1978	1 – National Conference, Eastern Division	NASL	3rd	1st round
1979	2	NSL	8th	were not played
1980	2	NSL	11th	
1981	2	NSL	5th	
1982	2	NSL	10th	
1983	1	CPSL	4th	Semi-Finals
1984	2	NSL		
1985	2	NSL	6th	Quarter-Finals
1986	2	NSL	8th	
1987	2	NSL	2nd	Semi-Finals
1988	2	NSL	4th	Champions
1989	2	NSL	2nd	were not played
1990	2	NSL	4th	were not played
1991	2	NSL	4th	were not played
1992	2	NSL	Champions	were not played
1993	2 – Western Division	NSL	2nd	Quarter-Finals
1997	2	CNSL	2nd	Quarter-finals
1998	3	CPSL	8th	did not qualify
1999	3	CPSL	2nd	Final
2000	3	CPSL	3rd	Champions
2001	3	CPSL	6th	did not qualify
2002	3 – Western Conference	CPSL	1st, Western	Semi-finals
2003	3 – Western Conference	CPSL	3rd, Western	Quarter-Finals
2004	3 – Western Conference	CPSL	2nd, Western	Champions
2005	3 – Eastern Conference	CPSL	2nd, Eastern	Semi-Finals
2006	3 – International Division	CSL	2nd, International	Semi-Finals
2007	3 – International Division	CSL	2nd, International	Champions
2008	3 – International Division	CSL	3rd, International	Quarter-Finals
2009	3 – International Division	CSL	2nd, International	Semi-Finals
2010	3 – First Division	CSL	8th	Semi-Finals
2011	3 – First Division	CSL	2nd	Champions
2012	3 – First Division	CSL	1st	Champions
2013	3 – First Division	CSL	3rd	Semi-Finals
2014	3 – First Division	CSL	2nd	Final
2015	3 – First Division	CSL	2nd	Champions

== Honours ==
- North American Soccer League: 1

Soccer Bowl '76

- Canadian National Soccer League: 4

1971, 1974, 1988, 1992

- Canadian Soccer League: 6

2000, 2004, 2007, 2011, 2012, 2015

- CNSL Playoff Champions: 3

1971, 1974, 1988

- CNSL Regular Season: 4

1970, 1971, 1972, 1992

- CSL Regular Season: 1

2012

- Canadian Open Cup: 3

1971, 1972, 1973

- NSL/CNSL Cup: 6

1972, 1975, 1988, 1989, 1992, 1993

- NSL Canada Cup: 1

1989

- Canadian International Soccer League: 2

1995, 1996

- Croatian World Club Championship: 2

2007, 2011

== Coaching history ==
- Vlado Romanov (1956)
- I. Kezman (1970)
- Arthur Rodrigues (1970)
- Ivan Jazbinšek (1971–1972)
- Vladimir Šimunić (1973–1974)
- Mišo Smajlović (1988)
- Tonko Vukušić (1989)
- Drago Šantić (1996)
- Zlatko Haramincic (1997)
- Rudolf Belin (1998)
- Bruno Pilaš (1999)
- Velimir Crljen (2000)
- Bruno Pilaš (2001)
- Zarko Brala (2002)
- Drago Šantić (2002–2003)
- Velimir Crljen (2003)
- Aldo Krajcar (2004)
- Velimir Crljen (2005)
- Mladen Pralija (2006)
- Milodrag Akmadzic (2007)
- Miroslav Buljan (2008)
- Velimir Crljen (2009)
- Kreso Grnjto (2010)
- Velimir Crljen (2011–2015)
- Josip Keran (2016–)

== Notable players ==
SFR Yugoslavia and Croatia

- Ibrahim Arslanovic (1973–1974)
- Aljoša Asanović (2001)
- Božo Bakota (1988–1990)
- Marijan Bilić (1970–1974)
- Josip Bonacin (2012)
- Marijan Bradvic (1971)
- Mirsad Cehaic (1974)
- Velimir Crljen (2000, 2002–2006)
- Miralem Fazlić (1974)
- Joško Gluić (1973)
- Jerko Granic (1971–1974)
- Goran Grubesic (2003)
- Ante Ivković (1973)
- Josip Juric (2002)
- Tihomir Maletic (2007)
- Zlatko Mesić (1971)
- Goran Meštrović (1990)
- Ivan Mršić (1982–1983)
- Jure Pavic (2003, 2006)
- Bruno Pilaš (1971–1972)
- Tonći Pirija (2008–2012)
- Mladen Pralija (1992–1993)
- Hrvoje Koščević (1992–1993)
- Krešimir Prgomet (2014)
- Boris Psaker (1970–1974)
- Ivica Raguž (2003)
- George Simcich (1964–1972)
- Aleja Solak (1970–1974)
- Damir Šutevski (1974)
- Ivan Žgela (2009–2010)
- Antonijo Zupan (2003–2006, 2009)

Albania

- Gentian Buzali (1997, 2000)
- Tony Preci (2000)
- Ervin Ryta (2000)

Argentina

- Flavio Ivanovic (1990)

Canada

- Nikola Andrijevic (2001–2003)
- George Azcurra (1999–2008)
- Marko Bedenikovic (2004, 2008)
- Željko Bilecki (1971–1974)
- Orlin Chalmers (2003–2005)
- Oscar Cordon (2015)
- Shawn Faria (1999)
- Andrés Fresenga (2015)
- Stevie Gill (1994–1996)
- Willy Giummarra (2004)
- Chris Handsor (2000)
- Roman Harapyn (1997, 2005)
- Alan Harvey (1970)
- Nicholas Lindsay (2015)
- Semir Mesanovic (2001–2002)
- Paul Moore (2000)
- David Velastegui (2013–2014)

Jamaica

- Corcel Blair (1971–1974)

Netherlands

- Harry de Vlugt (1970)

Poland

- Czesław Zajac (1998–1999)

Portugal

- Eusébio 1975–1976
