= 1995 Canadian National Soccer League season =

Canadian National Soccer League
- Season: 1995
- Champions: Toronto Jets (regular season); St. Catharines Wolves (playoffs, 2nd title)
- League cup: St. Catharines Wolves
- Matches: 30
- Goals: 98 (3.27 per match)
- Top goalscorer: Laszlo Martonfi (12)
- Best goalkeeper: Joe Ciaravino
- Biggest home win: St. Catharines Wolves 7-1 Hamilton White Eagles (September 6, 1995)
- Biggest away win: Hamilton White Eagles 0-5 Toronto Jets (September 17, 1995)
- Highest scoring: St. Catharines Wolves 7-1 Hamilton White Eagles (September 6, 1995)

The 1995 Canadian National Soccer League season was the third season of the league under the Canadian National Soccer League name, and the seventy-third season in the league's history. The season began on May 26, 1995, with London City facing Scarborough Astros at Cove Road Stadium. The season concluded on November 2, 1995, with St. Catharines Wolves claiming their second CNSL Championship after defeating Toronto Jets in a two-game series.

The CNSL lost its presence in Quebec and became solely located in the province of Ontario. The league also received some local competition with the advent of the Canadian International Soccer League (Puma League). The league managed to recruit Parma FC, who were the 1994–95 UEFA Cup champions, for their All-Star match.

== Overview ==
Since the conclusion of the 1993 season, the CNSL went through a tumultuous period throughout the remainder of the 1990s. The territorial boundaries of the league were further reduced from the Montreal-Windsor corridor and became primarily restricted within the Golden Horseshoe area in Ontario. Both of the league's franchises in Montreal departed, with the Montreal Ramblers relocating to the American-based USISL Pro League under the name New Hampshire Ramblers, and Montreal Croatia folding. The CNSL also experienced direct competition from the newly formed Canadian International Soccer League (Puma League), which received sponsorship from Puma. The Puma League was centered around the Toronto area, with ethnically supported teams, and was able to attract Toronto Croatia into defect.

The results of these events caused a decrease in league membership to six teams, with all the clubs being located in the province of Ontario. After a twelve-year absence in the Hamilton region, the league returned with the acceptance of the Hamilton White Eagles. The previous time the city was represented in the CNSL was in the 1983 season, when the Hamilton Steelers competed in the league. Former league commissioner and Toronto Italia owner Rocco Lofranco resigned, and the league took over the Toronto franchise. Various reports claimed that Lofranco had intentions of acquiring the franchise rights of the Toronto Rockets to receive entry into the American Professional Soccer League, but the Rockets ownership refused to relinquish their territorial rights.

=== Teams ===
Team	City	Stadium	Manager
Hamilton White Eagles	Hamilton, Ontario	Brian Timmis Stadium	Lou Nagy Lucio Bravo
London City	London, Ontario	Cove Road Stadium	Ian Mahoney
Scarborough Astros	Scarborough, Ontario	Birchmount Stadium	Jorge Armua
St. Catharines Wolves	St. Catharines, Ontario	Club Roma Stadium	Mark Konert
Toronto Italia	Etobicoke, Ontario	Centennial Park Stadium	David Gee
Toronto Jets	North York, Ontario	Esther Shiner Stadium	Vince Solomita

Location of CNSL teams outside of Toronto for the 1995 CNSL season.

Location of CNSL teams in Toronto for the 1995 CNSL season.

== Final standings ==
Pos	Team	Pld	W	D	L	GF	GA	GD	Pts	Qualification
1	Toronto Jets (C)	10	6	2	2	23	13	+10	20	Qualification for Playoffs
2	St. Catharines Wolves (O)	9	6	1	2	24	12	+12	19	Qualification for Playoffs
3	Toronto Italia	10	4	3	3	19	16	+3	15	Qualification for Playoffs
4	London City	10	4	1	5	10	15	−5	13	Qualification for Playoffs
5	Scarborough Astros	10	2	4	4	12	15	−3	10	
6	Hamilton White Eagles	9	1	1	7	10	27	−17	4	

Updated to match(es) played on October 21, 1995. Source:
Rules for classification: 1) points; 2) goal difference; 3) number of goals scored.
(C) Champions; (O) Play-off winners

== Playoffs ==
=== Finals ===
30 October 1995

St. Catharines Wolves	1–1	Toronto Jets
John Williams 64'	[ Report]	Tony Zanini 54'

Club Roma Stadium, St. Catharines, Ontario
Attendance: 60
Referee: Andrzej Jasinski
2 November 1995
20:00 ET

Toronto Jets	1–2	St. Catharines Wolves
Zomparelli 87'	Report	Moore 51'; Walker 56'

Esther Shiner Stadium, North York, Ontario
Attendance: 30
Referee: Tony Camacho

GK	1	(Canada) Joe Ciaravino
RB	3	John Annisi
CB	5	(Canada) Tom Perks
CB	4	(Canada) Richard Alexander
LB	2	John Vidovich
RM	8	Orlando Rizzo
CM	7	Garvin Houston
CM	13	Vince Cancelliere	(substituted off) 59'
LM	11	(Canada) Marco Antonucci
ST	10	Jack Zomparelli
ST	15	Tony Zanini
Substitutes:
GK	12	Aldo Aiudi
DF	14	Lou Fiaccola
MF	16	Lino Solomita
MF	6	Miguel Ferraira
FW	9	Robert Marcucci	(substituted on) 59'

GK	23	(Canada) Dino Perri
RB	2	Tony Carbonaro	(substituted off) 45'
CB	3	McIver Broomes
CB	12	Adrian Prenc
LB	5	John McNeil
RM	14	Gary McGuchan	(substituted off) 74'
CM	7	(Canada) Chris Handsor
CM	13	(Canada) Lucio Ianiero
LM	10	(Canada) Cameron Walker
ST	11	(Canada) Carlo Arghittu
ST	16	(Canada) John Williams
Substitutes:
GK	1	Lee Burrows
DF	6	Clay Holmes	(substituted on) 74'
MF	8	Mark Konert
FW	9	(Canada) Paul Moore	(substituted on) 45'
Manager:
Mark Konert

St. Catharines won 3–2 on aggregate.

== Cup ==
The cup tournament (known as the Umbro Cup for sponsorship reasons) was a separate contest from the rest of the season, in which all six teams took part. All the matches were separate from the regular season. Teams played each other once home and away in the Cup competition, and the first and second place teams would play a singles match for the Cup.

Pos	Team	Pld	W	D	L	GF	GA	GD	Pts	Qualification
1	Scarborough Astros	10	6	4	0	21	8	+13	22	Qualification for Playoffs
2	St. Catharines Wolves (C)	10	5	2	3	15	10	+5	17	Qualification for Playoffs
3	Toronto Jets	10	4	3	3	12	9	+3	15	
4	Toronto Italia	10	4	2	4	20	21	−1	14	
5	Hamilton White Eagles	10	2	2	6	16	25	−9	8	
6	London City	10	1	3	6	12	23	−11	6	

Updated to match(es) played on October 21, 1995. Source: http://www.rocketrobinsoccerintoronto.com/soccer14.htm
Rules for classification: 1) points; 2) goal difference; 3) number of goals scored.
(C) Champions

=== Matches ===
June 5, 1995	Toronto Italia	1–5	Scarborough Astros	Etobicoke, Ontario
	Jin Rii 79'	Report	Gary DeLeon 11'; Lazlo Martonfi 15', 69'; Michael Marshall 85'	Stadium: Centennial Park Stadium; Attendance: 700; Referee: Julio Chewacco

June 6, 1995	St. Catharines Wolves	2–1	London City	St. Catharines, Ontario
		Report		Stadium: Club Roma Stadium

June 12, 1995	Toronto Italia	2–3	St. Catharines Wolves	Etobicoke, Ontario
	Maradona 20'	Report	Moore 22'; Tony Carbonara 30'	Stadium: Centennial Park Stadium; Attendance: 300

June 16, 1995	London City	0–1	Toronto Jets	London, Ontario
		Report		Stadium: Cove Road Stadium

June 18, 1995	Scarborough Astros	2–2	Hamilton White Eagles	Scarborough, Ontario
		Report		Stadium: Birchmount Stadium

June 21, 1995	St. Catharines Wolves	3–1	Hamilton White Eagles	St. Catharines, Ontario
		Report		Stadium: Club Roma Stadium

June 22, 1995	Toronto Jets	1–3	Scarborough Astros	North York, Ontario
	Gioia 59'	Report	Gary DeLeon 55', 95'; Carvelles 89'	Stadium: Esther Shiner Stadium; Attendance: 400

June 23, 1995	London City	0–2	St. Catharines Wolves	London, Ontario
		Report		Stadium: Cove Road Stadium

June 27, 1995	St. Catharines Wolves	0–2	Toronto Jets	St. Catharines, Ontario
		Report		Stadium: Club Roma Stadium

June 30, 1995	London City	3–3	Hamilton White Eagles	London, Ontario
		Report		Stadium: Cove Road Stadium

July 2, 1995	Hamilton White Eagles	0–3	Toronto Jets	Hamilton, Ontario
		Report		Stadium: Brian Timmis Stadium

July 9, 1995	Hamilton White Eagles	2–1	St. Catharines Wolves	Hamilton, Ontario
		Report		Stadium: Brian Timmis Stadium

July 9, 1995	Scarborough Astros	1–1	Toronto Italia	Scarborough, Ontario
		Report		Stadium: Birchmount Stadium

July 14, 1995	London City	1–3	Toronto Italia	London, Ontario
		Report		Stadium: Cove Road Stadium

July 16, 1995	Scarborough Astros	1–1	St. Catharines Wolves	Scarborough, Ontario
		Report		Stadium: Birchmount Stadium

July 17, 1995	Toronto Italia	1–1	Toronto Jets	Etobicoke, Ontario
	Maradona 82'	Report	Tom Perks 83'	Stadium: Centennial Park Stadium; Attendance: 700; Referee: Tony Camacho

July 18, 1995	St. Catharines Wolves	0–1	Scarborough Astros	St. Catharines, Ontario
		Report		Stadium: Club Roma Stadium

July 23, 1995	Scarborough Astros	1–0	Toronto Jets	Scarborough, Ontario
		Report		Stadium: Birchmount Stadium

July 27, 1995	Toronto Jets	3–1	Hamilton White Eagles	North York, Ontario
20:00	Orlando Rizzo 49'; Jack Zomparelli 81'; Robert Marcucci 87'	Report	Zoran Zubic 42'	Stadium: Esther Shiner Stadium; Referee: Hugh Elliot

August 6, 1995	Hamilton White Eagles	1–2	Scarborough Astros	Hamilton, Ontario
		Report		Stadium: Brian Timmis Stadium

August 7, 1995	Toronto Italia	4–2	London City	Etobicoke, Ontario
20:00	Mike Palmitta 47'; Maradona 75'; Crljen 76'; Nick Maxwell 79'	Report	John Bottineau 55'; Ian Mahoney 72'	Stadium: Centennial Park Stadium; Attendance: 400; Referee: Mike Fretanovich

August 20, 1995	Scarborough Astros	4–0	London City	Scarborough, Ontario
	Laszlo Martonfi 1', 69'; Hanna 53'; Audley Taffe 88'	Report		Stadium: Birchmount Stadium; Referee: Glen Sharkey

August 21, 1995	Toronto Italia	1–3	Hamilton White Eagles	Etobicoke, Ontario
20:00	Nick Maxwell 77'	Report	Sasa Vukovic 21'; Zoran Zubic 51'; Tommy Fiore 83'	Stadium: Centennial Park Stadium; Referee: Frank Marcello

August 24, 1995	Toronto Jets	0–0	Hamilton White Eagles	North York, Ontario
20:00		Report		Stadium: Esther Shiner Stadium; Attendance: 100

August 25, 1995	London City	1–1	Scarborough Astros	London, Ontario
		Report		Stadium: Cove Road Stadium

August 27, 1995	Hamilton White Eagles	2–3	London City	Hamilton, Ontario
		Report		Stadium: Brian Timmis Stadium

August 29, 1995	St. Catharines Wolves	3–1	Toronto Italia	St. Catharines, Ontario
		Report		Stadium: Club Roma Stadium

August 31, 1995	Toronto Jets	1–2	Toronto Italia	North York, Ontario
20:00	Jack Zomparelli 26'	Report	Igor Ciric 21'; Mike Palmitta 36'	Stadium: Esther Shiner Stadium; Attendance: 200; Referee: James Bainbridge

September 10, 1995	Hamilton White Eagles	1–4	Toronto Italia	Hamilton, Ontario
		Report		Stadium: Brian Timmis Stadium

September 28, 1995	Toronto Jets	1–1	London City	North York, Ontario
20:00	Marco Antonucci 76'	Report	John Bottineau 75'	Stadium: Esther Shiner Stadium; Attendance: 40; Referee: Gord Arrowsmith

=== Finals ===
10 October 1995

St. Catharines Wolves	0–0	Scarborough Astros
	Report

Club Roma Stadium, St. Catharines, Ontario
15 October 1995

Scarborough Astros	0–0 (a.e.t.)	St. Catharines Wolves
	Report
Penalties
Hanna (penalty missed); Laszlo Martonfi (penalty missed); Ednie Tavares (penalty missed)	0 – 3	Gary McGuchan (penalty scored); Moore (penalty scored); Campbell (penalty scored)

Birchmount Stadium, Scarborough, Ontario
Attendance: 60
Referee: Gord Arrowsmith

GK	1	(Brazil) Paulo Silva
RB	4	John DiBuono
CB	18	Michael Marshall
CB	3	Rene Martin
LB	7	Alex Nardi	(substituted off) 67'
RM	8	(Canada) Gad Espinosa	(substituted off) 72'
CM	5	Leo Lopez
LM	21	(Trinidad and Tobago) Rick Titus
ST	13	Audley Taffe
ST	9	Laszlo Martonfi
ST	11	Gary DeLeon	(substituted off) 79'
Substitutes:
GK	12	(Romania) Florin Oprea
DF	14	Ednie Tavares	(substituted on) 79'
MF	19	Kerwin Skeete	(substituted on) 67'
MF	10	(Iraq) Basil Hanna	(substituted on) 72'
MF	17	Alim Rajan
Manager:
Jorge Armua

GK	23	(Canada) Dino Perri
RB	5	John McNeil
CB	12	Adrian Prence	(substituted off) 119'
CB	3	McIver Broomes
LB	2	Tony Carbonaro
RM	10	Tom Bernardi	(substituted off) 59'
CM	13	(Canada) Lucio Ianiero
CM	6	(Canada) Shayne Campbell
LM	11	(Canada) Carlo Arghittu
ST	7	Gary Brian	(substituted off) 118'
ST	9	(Canada) Paul Moore
Substitutes:
GK	15	Lee Burrows	(substituted on) 119'
MF	8	Clay Holmes	(substituted on) 118'
MF	14	Gary McGuchan	(substituted on) 59'
Manager:
Mark Konert

Assistant referees:
Glenn Sharkey

St. Catharines won 3–0 on penalties.

== All-Star game ==
The all-star match was held in Toronto, Ontario, at Varsity Stadium, and the league arranged for Parma FC, the 1994–95 UEFA Cup champions, as the opposition for the match.

August 13, 1995
18:00 ET

CNSL All-Stars	0–5	Parma
	Report	Baggio 12'; Sensini 29', 43'; Apolloni 73'; Stoichkov 82'

Varsity Stadium, Toronto, Ontario
Attendance: 18,000
Referee: Les Wilcox

GK	1	(Brazil) Paulo Silva
RB	2	Rene Martin
CB	3	(Canada) Franco Spadafina	(substituted off) 45'
CB	4	(Canada) Richard Alexander	(substituted off) 73'
LB	5	(Canada) Chris Handsor	(substituted off) 80'
RM	6	Jeff Brown
CM	7	Jack Zomparelli	(substituted off) 45'
CM	8	(Canada) Lucio Ianiero	(substituted off) 66'
LM	9	(Canada) Peyvand Mossavat	(substituted off) 73'
ST	10	(Argentina) Lalo Maradona	(substituted off) 73'
ST	11	Gary DeLeon	(substituted off) 73'
Substitutes:
DF	16	(Canada) Shayne Campbell	(substituted on) 45'
DF	21	Sasa Vukovic	(substituted on) 45'
MF	20	Tom Bernardi	(substituted on) 66'
MF	18	Orlando Rizzo	(substituted on) 73'
MF	22	Garvin Houston	(substituted on) 73'
FW	17	Alex Nardi	(substituted on) 73'
FW	14	Andrew Loague	(substituted on) 73'
FW	15	Laszlo Martonfi	(substituted on) 80'

GK	1	(Italy) Luca Bucci	(substituted off) 22'
RB	2	(Italy) Antonio Benarrivo
CB	5	(Italy) Luigi Apolloni
CB	4	(Italy) Lorenzo Minotti	(substituted off) 66'
LB	3	(Italy) Alberto Di Chiara
RM	7	(Argentina) Roberto Sensini	(substituted off) 68'
CM	24	(Italy) Dino Baggio
LM	9	Pripa
ST	8	(Bulgaria) Hristo Stoichkov
ST	10	(Italy) Gianfranco Zola
ST	16	(Italy) Filippo Inzaghi
Substitutes:
GK	22	(Italy) Giovanni Galli	(substituted on) 22'
DF		Marcello Castellini	(substituted on) 66'
MF	25	Gabriele Pin	(substituted on) 68'
Manager:
(Italy) Nevio Scala

== Individual awards ==
The annual Canadian National Soccer League awards ceremony was held at the North York Council Chambers in North York, Ontario, with an attendance of around 200 people. The master of the ceremony was future Hamilton Bulldogs president Cary Kaplan, who was operating as the secretary of the league. London and St. Catharines were tied, each with two awards being given to the clubs. Mark Konert was named the Coach of the Year after leading St. Catharines to a double, which consisted of the CNSL Championship and Umbro Cup. Wolves midfielder Chris Handsor was voted the MVP and would go on to play in the USL A-League and play a prominent role in indoor soccer throughout North America.

London City was given the Most Disciplined Team award for being the most disciplined team throughout the season, and John Bottineau received the Rookie of the Year. The remainder of the awards, such as the Golden Boot, went to Scarborough Astros Laszlo Martonfi, and Joe Ciaravino of the Toronto Jets was named the Goalkeeper of the Year. Les Wilcox was named the Referee of the Year.

Award	Player (Club)
CNSL Most Valuable Player	Chris Handsor (St. Catharines)
CNSL Golden Boot	Laszlo Martonfi (Scarborough Astros)
CNSL Goalkeeper of the Year Award	Joe Ciaravino (Toronto Jets)
CNSL Rookie of the Year Award	John Bottineau (London City)
CNSL Coach of the Year Award	Mark Konert (St. Catharines)
CNSL Referee of the Year Award	Les Wilcox
CNSL Most Disciplined Team Award	London City

First Team All-Stars

Goalkeeper	Defenders	Midfielders	Forwards
Dino Perri (St. Catharines Wolves)	Rene Martin (Scarborough Astros); Jeff Brown (London City); Shawn Taggart (London City); Tom Perks (Toronto Jets)	Chris Handsor (St. Catharines Wolves); Jack Zomparelli (Toronto Jets); Orlando Rizzo (Toronto Jets); Lucio Ianiero (St. Catharines Wolves)	John Bottineau (London City); Gary Deleon (Scarborough Astros)
