= 1996 Canadian National Soccer League season =

Canadian National Soccer League
- Season: 1996
- Champions: Toronto Italia (regular season); Toronto Italia (playoffs, 14th title)
- League cup: St. Catharines Wolves
- Matches: 44
- Goals: 158 (3.59 per match)
- Top goalscorer: Michele Gioia
- Best goalkeeper: Joe Ciaravino
- Biggest home win: Toronto Italia 9-0 North York Talons (August 25); Toronto Italia 9-1 London City (October 6)
- Biggest away win: North York Talons 2-8 Toronto Italia (July 14)
- Highest scoring: North York Talons 2-8 Toronto Italia (July 14); Oakville Western Canadians 8-2 London City (September 7)

The 1996 Canadian National Soccer League season was the seventy-fourth season for the Canadian National Soccer League. The season began on May 31, 1996, and concluded on October 27, 1996, with Toronto Italia defeating St. Catharines Wolves in a two-game series for the CNSL Championship. St. Catharines managed to secure their fourth league cup title after finishing first in the tournament standings.

== Overview ==
The membership in the league increased to seven teams with three new entries. The league expanded to the Oakville territory with the addition of the Oakville Canadian Westerns, and the acceptance of Toronto Supra from the Canadian International Soccer League (Puma League). The North York Talons represented the Caribbean Community in the Greater Toronto Area. The Hamilton White Eagles departed to join the Canadian International Soccer League, and the Toronto Jets merged with Toronto Italia.

Toronto Italia, under new ownership, transferred its home venue to Rainbow Creek Stadium in Woodbridge, Vaughan. Italia also managed to recruit Diego Maradona for the CNSL All-Star match. In the league's executive branch, Peter Li Preti served as president, and Michael Di Biase as commissioner.

=== Teams ===
Team	City	Stadium	Manager
London City	London, Ontario	Cove Road Stadium	Steve Roney
North York Talons	North York, Ontario	Esther Shiner Stadium	Trevor Dennis
Oakville Canadian Westerns	Oakville, Ontario	Sheridan College	Mike Palmiotta
Scarborough Astros	Scarborough, Ontario	Birchmount Stadium	Jorge Armua
St. Catharines Wolves	St. Catharines, Ontario (Vansickle)	Club Roma Stadium	Mark Konert
Toronto Italia	Vaughan, Ontario	Rainbow Creek Stadium	Peter Pinizzotto
Toronto Supra	Toronto, Ontario	Lamport Stadium	

Location of CNSL teams outside of Toronto for the 1996 CNSL season.

Location of CNSL teams in Toronto for the 1996 CNSL season.

== Final standings ==
Pos	Team	Pld	W	D	L	GF	GA	GD	Pts	Qualification
1	Toronto Italia (C, O)	12	10	2	0	51	7	+44	32	Qualification for Playoffs
2	St. Catharines Wolves	11	8	2	1	36	4	+32	26	Qualification for Playoffs
3	Toronto Supra	12	6	4	2	25	12	+13	22	Qualification for Playoffs
4	Oakville Western Canadians	11	5	2	4	26	18	+8	17	Qualification for Playoffs
5	London City	12	3	1	8	10	41	−31	10	
6	Scarborough Astros	10	0	3	7	2	23	−21	3	
7	North York Talons	12	0	2	10	8	53	−45	2	

Updated to match(es) played on October 14, 1996. Source:
Rules for classification: 1) points; 2) goal difference; 3) number of goals scored.
(C) Champions; (O) Play-off winners

== Playoffs ==
=== Semifinals ===
October 16, 1996	St. Catharines Wolves	0–0	Toronto Supra	St. Catharines, Ontario
20:15 ET		[ (Report)]		Stadium: Club Roma Stadium

October 20, 1996	Toronto Supra	1–2 (a.e.t.)	St. Catharines Wolves	Toronto, Ontario
15:00 ET	Mella 20'	[ (Report)]	Arghittu 45'; Gary Bryan 115'	Stadium: Lamport Stadium

St. Catharines won the series 2–1 on aggregate.

October 20, 1996	Toronto Italia	2–3	Oakville Western Canadians	Vaughan, Ontario
16:00 ET	Gamble 34'; Caporella 74'	(Report)	Lui Fotia 11'; Andrew Loague 52', 91'	Stadium: Rainbow Creek Stadium; Attendance: 80; Referee: Tony Camacho

October 21, 1996	Oakville Western Canadians	1–4	Toronto Italia	Oakville, Ontario
20:00 ET		(Report)		Stadium: Bronte Park

Toronto won the series 6–4 on aggregate.

=== Finals ===
24 October 1996
20:15

St. Catharines Wolves	0–5	Toronto Italia
	[ Report]	Maradona 1', 45', Caporella 10'

Club Roma Stadium, St. Catharines, Ontario
27 October 1996
17:00 ET

Toronto Italia	6–0	St. Catharines Wolves
Zomparelli 2', 15'; Zanini 37'; Gamble 57'; Maxwell 72'; Maradona 89'	Report

Rainbow Creek Stadium, Vaughan, Ontario
Attendance: 200
Referee: Andrew Jasinski

GK	1	(Canada) Joe Ciaravino
RB	2	John Annisi
CB	5	(Canada) Tom Perks
CB	4	(Canada) Richard Alexander
LB	3	(Canada) Franco Spadafina
RM	20	Nick Maxwell
CM	6	Jack Zomparelli
LM	7	Miguel Ferreira
ST	12	Anthony Zanini	(substituted off) 72'
ST	10	(Argentina) Lalo Maradona
ST	8	(South Africa) Ryan Gamble	(substituted off) 72'
Substitutes:
DF	18	Lou Fiaccola	(substituted on) 72'
MF	11	(Canada) Marco Antonucci	(substituted on) 72'
MF	16	Garvin Houston
MF	23	(Canada) Phil Caporella
Manager:
(Italy) Peter Pinizzotto

GK	1	(Canada) Dino Perri
RB	3	McIver Broomes
CB	2	John McNeil
CB	9	(Canada) Peyvand Mossavat
LB	15	(Canada) Jerry Cipriani
RM	20	Tom Bernardi
CM	19	(Trinidad and Tobago) Anton Skerritt
LM	8	(Trinidad and Tobago) Rick Titus
ST	9	(Canada) Paul Moore
ST	14	Gary Bryan
ST	25	(Canada) Carlo Arghittu
Manager:
(Canada) Dino Perri

Assistant referees:
Bill Teeuwen
Norma Clark

Toronto won 11–0 on aggregate.

== Cup ==
The cup tournament was a separate contest from the rest of the season, in which all seven teams took part. All the matches were separate from the regular season. Teams played each other once, home and away, in the Cup competition, and the first-place team would win the Cup competition. One match involving Toronto Italia and London City failed to materialize, but was of no consequence as St. Catharines Wolves accumulated enough points to secure the title.

=== Standings ===
Pos	Team	Pld	W	D	L	GF	GA	GD	Pts
1	St. Catharines Wolves (C)	12	10	1	1	33	9	+24	31
2	Toronto Italia	11	8	2	1	31	8	+23	26
3	Toronto Supra	12	8	2	2	32	13	+19	26
4	Oakville Canadian Westerns	12	5	2	5	20	21	−1	17
5	London City	11	3	2	6	14	22	−8	11
6	Scarborough Astros	12	2	1	9	12	31	−19	7
7	North York Talons	12	0	0	12	5	43	−38	0

Updated to match(es) played on October 14, 1996. Source: http://www.rocketrobinsoccerintoronto.com/cnslar20.htm
Rules for classification: 1) points; 2) goal difference; 3) number of goals scored.
(C) Champions

=== Matches ===
June 2, 1996	Toronto Italia	1–0	St. Catharines Wolves	Vaughan, Ontario
18:00	Caporella 77'	Report		Stadium: Rainbow Creek Stadium; Referee: Bridgeman

June 14, 1996	London City	0–4	Toronto Supra	London, Ontario
20:00		Report		Stadium: Cove Road Stadium

June 15, 1996	Oakville Canadian Westerns	0–2	Toronto Italia	Oakville, Ontario
18:00		Report		Stadium: Sheridan College

June 22, 1996	Oakville Canadian Westerns	5–1	North York Talons	Oakville, Ontario
18:00		Report		Stadium: Sheridan College

June 23, 1996	Toronto Italia	1–1	Toronto Supra	Vaughan, Ontario
18:00	Caporella 22'	Report	Gus Kouzmanis 93'	Stadium: Rainbow Creek Stadium; Attendance: 400; Referee: Steve Mortimer

June 26, 1996	St. Catharines Wolves	4–2	Scarborough Astros	St. Catharines, Ontario
20:15		Report		Stadium: Club Roma Stadium

July 7, 1996	North York Talons	0–3	London City	North York, Ontario
15:00		Report	John Bottineau 30'; Wilco Kadters 80'; Luan Jonuzi 85'	Stadium: Esther Shiner Stadium; Attendance: 70; Referee: Gord Arrowsmith

July 12, 1996	London City	2–2	Oakville Canadian Westerns	London, Ontario
20:00		Report		Stadium: Cove Road Stadium

July 13, 1996	Oakville Canadian Westerns	4–2	London City	Oakville, Ontario
18:00		Report		Stadium: Sheridan College

July 19, 1996	Toronto Supra	9–0	North York Talons	Toronto, Ontario
19:35		Report		Stadium: Lamport Stadium

July 20, 1996	Oakville Canadian Westerns	1–2	St. Catharines Wolves	Oakville, Ontario
18:00		Report		Stadium: Sheridan College

July 21, 1996	Scarborough Astros	2–0	North York Talons	Scarborough, Ontario
19:00		Report		Stadium: Birchmount Stadium

July 26, 1996	London City	2–0	Scarborough Astros	London, Ontario
20:00		Report		Stadium: Cove Road Stadium

July 28, 1996	Scarborough Astros	1–8	Toronto Italia	Scarborough, Ontario
19:00	Marco Bonofiglio 72'	Report	Gioia 26', 29'; Caporella 32', 37'; Tony Zanini 61', 70'; Gamble 81'; Richard Alexander 83'	Stadium: Birchmount Stadium; Attendance: 250; Referee: Steve Mortimer

August 2, 1996	London City	1–4	St. Catharines Wolves	London, Ontario
20:00		Report		Stadium: Cove Road Stadium

August 4, 1996	North York Talons	1–2	Scarborough Astros	North York, Ontario
19:00		Report		Stadium: Esther Shiner Stadium

August 4, 1996	Toronto Italia	2–2	Oakville Canadian Westerns	Vaughan, Ontario
18:00	Spadafina 36'; Gioia 90'	Report	Rob Anderson 61'; Bart Ostaszewski 95'	Stadium: Rainbow Creek Stadium; Attendance: 250; Referee: Mike Cvetanovich

August 7, 1996	St. Catharines Wolves	7–0	North York Talons	St. Catharines, Ontario
20:15		Report		Stadium: Club Roma Stadium

August 11, 1996	Scarborough Astros	1–1	London City	Scarborough, Ontario
19:00	Bill Heaney 30'	Report	John Bottineau 26'	Stadium: Birchmount Stadium; Attendance: 40; Referee: Mike Czetanovich

August 11, 1996	Toronto Supra	0–3	Toronto Italia	Toronto, Ontario
19:35		Report		Stadium: Lamport Stadium

August 18, 1996	North York Talons	1–5	Toronto Italia	North York, Ontario
19:00	Caswell Shaw 84'	Report	Maradona 1'; Spadafina 9'; Anthony Zanini 46'; Garvin Houston 56'; Gioia 86'	Stadium: Esther Shiner Stadium; Attendance: 150; Referee: Al Pereira

August 18, 1996	Scarborough Astros	3–4	Toronto Supra	Scarborough, Ontario
19:00		Report		Stadium: Birchmount Stadium

August 23, 1996	London City	0–2	Toronto Italia	London, Ontario
20:00		Report		Stadium: Cove Road Stadium

August 24, 1996	Oakville Canadian Westerns	2–5	Toronto Supra	Oakville, Ontario
18:00		Report		Stadium: Sheridan College

August 25, 1996	Scarborough Astros	0–3	St. Catharines Wolves	Scarborough, Ontario
19:00		Report		Stadium: Birchmount Stadium

August 30, 1996	London City	3–1	North York Talons	London, Ontario
20:00		Report		Stadium: Cove Road Stadium

September 4, 1996	St. Catharines Wolves	3–0	London City	St. Catharines, Ontario
20:15		Report		Stadium: CLub Roma Stadium

September 11, 1996	St. Catharines Wolves	2–0	Oakville Canadian Westerns	St. Catharines, Ontario
20:15		Report		Stadium: CLub Roma Stadium

September 13, 1996	Toronto Supra	2–0	Scarborough Astros	Toronto, Ontario
19:35		Report		Stadium: Lamport Stadium

September 15, 1996	Toronto Supra	1–0	London City	Toronto, Ontario
15:05		Report		Stadium: Lamport Stadium

September 25, 1996	St. Catharines Wolves	2–1	Toronto Italia	St. Catharines, Ontario
20:15		Report		Stadium: Club Roma Stadium

September 27, 1996	North York Talons	0–1	Toronto Supra	North York, Ontario
21:00		Report	Tony Tavares 68'	Stadium: Esther Shiner Stadium; Attendance: 30; Referee: Tony Martins

September 28, 1996	Oakville Canadian Westerns	2–1	Scarborough Astros	Oakville, Ontario
17:00		Report		Stadium: Sheridan College

September 29, 1996	Toronto Supra	1–1	St. Catharines Wolves	Toronto, Ontario
15:05		Report		Stadium: Lamport Stadium

September 29, 1996	Toronto Italia	3–1	North York Talons	Vaughan, Ontario
17:00	Gioia 30', 89'; Maradona 51'	Report	Rohan Thomas 60'	Stadium: Rainbow Creek Stadium; Attendance: 100; Referee: George Kelly

October 2, 1996	St. Catharines Wolves	3–2	Toronto Supra	St. Catharines, Ontario
20:15		Report		Stadium: Club Roma Stadium

October 6, 1996	North York Talons	0–1	Oakville Canadian Westerns	North York, Ontario
15:00		Report	Zajac 64'	Stadium: Esther Shiner Stadium; Attendance: 40; Referee: Isaac Mata

October 13, 1996	Toronto Supra	2–0	Oakville Canadian Westerns	Toronto, Ontario
15:05		Report		Stadium: Lamport Stadium

October 13, 1996	Toronto Italia	3–0	Scarborough Astros	Vaughan, Ontario
16:00		Report		Stadium: Rainbow Creek Stadium

== All-Star game ==
The all-star team assembled by the league was limited in its selection of players due to St. Catharines and Oakville protesting the allowance of their players. As St. Catharines had earlier participated in a European tour and their players required the necessary rest. Toronto Italia were selected as the opposition, and managed to attract Diego Maradona to play alongside his brother, Lalo Maradona. The match was commemorated as the 75th anniversary of the league, and advertised as one of Diego Maradona's final matches. The reported payoff to Maradona was $40,000, with Boca Juniors receiving a share due to ownership of player rights. An additional $15,000 was charged if reporters wished to conduct an interview, and the league insured Maradona for five million dollars.

September 2, 1996
20:00 ET

CNSL All-Stars	1–2	Toronto Italia
Mella 18'	Report	Jack Zomparelli 62'; Maradona 67'

Birchmount Stadium, Scarborough, Ontario
Attendance: 6500
Referee: Walter Kershner

GK	1	(Brazil) Paulo Silva	(substituted off) 65'
RB	2	Leonardo Simon
CB	3	Rene Martin
CB	4	John DiBuono	(substituted off) 64'
LB	17	Paul Hillman
RM	5	Leo Lopez	(substituted off) 64'
CM	7	Tony Tavares	(substituted off) 64'
CM	8	Alex Nardi	(substituted off) 45'
LM	10	(Canada) Adolfo Mella
ST	16	(Canada) John Bottineau	(substituted off) 45'
ST	14	Gus Kouzmanis
Substitutes:
GK	12	Milan Popov	(substituted on) 65'
DF	24	(Canada) Tonino Commisso	(substituted on) 45'
DF	25	Gerald Gallacher	(substituted on) 64'
MF	11	Lincoln Williams	(substituted on) 64'
MF	6	Ian Bryan	(substituted on) 64'
FW	9	Luan Jonuzi
FW	13	(Dominica) Anthony Dominique	(substituted on) 64'

GK	1	(Canada) Joe Ciaravino	(substituted off) 86'
RB	3	(Canada) Franco Spadafina
CB	4	(Canada) Richard Alexander
CB	5	(Canada) Tom Perks
LB	2	John Annisi	(substituted off) 45'
RM	11	(Canada) Marco Antonucci	(substituted off) 57'
CM	9	(Argentina) Lalo Maradona
CM	10	(Argentina) Diego Maradona	(substituted off) 85'
LM	6	Jack Zomparelli
CF	22	(Italy) Michele Gioia	(substituted off) 57'
CF	23	(Canada) Phil Caporella	(substituted off) 78'
Substitutes:
GK	00	Mike Ivancescu	(substituted on) 86'
DF	7	Miguel Ferreira
DF	18	Lou Fiaccola	(substituted on) 85'
MF	16	Garvin Houston	(substituted on) 78'
MF	20	Nick Maxwell	(substituted on) 45'
FW	12	Antony Zanini	(substituted on) 57'
FW	8	(South Africa) Ryan Gamble	(substituted on) 57'
Manager:
(Italy) Peter Pinizotto

== Individual awards ==
The annual Canadian National Soccer League awards ceremony was held at the Hollywood Princess Banquet Hall in Vaughan, Ontario, with an attendance of 400 people. The majority of the awards were received by Toronto Italia, with eight recipients. After leading Toronto to an undefeated streak and a double, head coach Peter Pinizzotto was given the honor of Coach of the Year. Michele Gioia was named both the MVP and Golden Boot winner consequently, the following season, he was signed by the Montreal Impact in the USISL A-League. For the second consecutive season, Joe Ciaravino received the Goalkeeper of the Year, and was also given a contract with the Toronto Lynx. The administrative branch of Toronto Italia was recognized with honors, with Joe Mallozzi winning Manager of the Year, and Pasquale Fioccola being awarded the President of the Year.

Toronto Supra came in second with two awards, with Gus Kouzmanis being named the Rookie of the Year. The Best Public Relations Director award was given to Sergio Giancola, who was later instrumental in acquiring a Major Arena Soccer League franchise in the GTA as the Mississauga MetroStars. The remainder of the awards went to North York Talons as the Most Improved, and London City as the Most Disciplined team. The Referee of the Year went to match official Manuel Orellana.

Award	Player (Club)
CNSL Most Valuable Player	Michele Gioia (Toronto Italia)
CNSL Golden Boot	Michele Gioia (Toronto Italia)
CNSL Goalkeeper of the Year Award	Joe Ciaravino (Toronto Italia)
CNSL Rookie of the Year Award	Gus Kouzmanis (Toronto Supra)
CNSL Coach of the Year Award	Peter Pinizzotto (Toronto Italia)
CNSL Manager of the Year Award	Joe Mallozzi (Toronto Italia)
CNSL President of the Year Award	Pasquale Fioccola (Toronto Italia)
CNSL Best Public Relations Director Award	Sergio Giancola (Toronto Supra)
CNSL Referee of the Year Award	Manuel Orellana
CNSL Most Improved Team Award	North York Talons
CNSL Most Disciplined Team Award	London City
