= 1994 Canadian National Soccer League season =

Canadian National Soccer League
- Season: 1994
- Champions: Toronto Italia (regular season); Toronto Italia (playoffs, 13th title)
- League cup: St. Catharines Roma
- Matches: 42
- Goals: 115 (2.74 per match)
- Top goalscorer: Ryan Gamble
- Best goalkeeper: Paulo Silva

The 1994 Canadian National Soccer League season was the seventy-second season for the Canadian National Soccer League. The season began on May 28, 1994, with Montreal Ramblers facing Toronto Croatia at the Complexe sportif Claude-Robillard. The majority of the season was contested by the reigning champions, St. Catharines Roma, along with Montreal Croatia and Toronto Italia. The title was eventually won by Toronto Italia after defeating St. Catharines in the CNSL Championship final. Toronto would also secure the double, which included the regular-season title. St. Catharines Roma won the league cup.

The league lost its presence in Manitoba and was restricted in Ontario and Quebec. The league continued to operate as the only exclusively Canadian professional league within the country, while the Canadian clubs in the American Professional Soccer League served as the highest-tier league in the country's soccer structure.

== Overview ==
The season saw a reduction in league membership as the boundaries of the league were restricted to Ontario and Quebec. The CNSL lost its presence in Manitoba as the Winnipeg Fury ceased operations due to heavy financial losses. While the Eastern Division of Quebec was disbanded with only Montreal Croatia, and Montreal Ramblers operating in the province. Richmond Hill Kick was suspended midway through the 1993 season after several missed scheduled matches and failure in payment fees. Toronto Rockets were awarded a franchise in the American Professional Soccer League to replace the Toronto Blizzard.

After a dispute over philosophical differences with league commissioner Rocco Lofranco, the Windsor Wheels joined the United States Interregional Soccer League and relocated to Detroit, Michigan. Another notable departure occurred near the conclusion of the season as Toronto Croatia withdrew after a dispute with the front office, and the following season joined the Canadian International Soccer League (Puma League). While at the live gate, the league struggled in drawing consistent crowds, which, according to Lofranco, the 1994 FIFA World Cup played a factor in lowering attendance numbers.

=== Teams ===
Team	City	Stadium	Manager
London City	London, Ontario	Cove Road Stadium	Harry Gauss
Montreal Croatia	Montreal, Quebec	Stade du Parc Hérbert	Simon Demo
Montreal Ramblers	Montreal, Quebec	Complexe sportif Claude-Robillard	
Scarborough Astros	Scarborough, Ontario	Birchmount Stadium	Jorge Armua
St. Catharines Roma	St. Catharines, Ontario	Club Roma Stadium	Mark Konert
Toronto Croatia	Etobicoke, Ontario	Centennial Park Stadium	
Toronto Italia	Etobicoke, Ontario	Centennial Park Stadium	Peter Pinizzotto
Toronto Jets	North York, Ontario	Esther Shiner Stadium	Adam Pagliaroli

Location of CNSL teams outside of Toronto for the 1994 CNSL season.

Locations of teams in Quebec for the 1994 CNSL season.

== Final standings ==
Pos	Team	Pld	W	D	L	GF	GA	GD	Pts	Qualification
1	Toronto Italia (C, O)	12	7	4	1	20	9	+11	18	Qualification for Playoffs
2	St. Catharines Roma	12	6	2	4	17	10	+7	14	Qualification for Playoffs
3	Montreal Croatia	12	6	2	4	26	21	+5	14	Qualification for Playoffs
4	London City	12	4	3	5	17	18	−1	11	Qualification for Playoffs
5	Scarborough Astros	12	2	6	4	11	15	−4	10	Qualification for Playoffs
6	Toronto Jets	12	3	4	5	10	20	−10	10	Qualification for Playoffs
7	Montreal Ramblers	12	3	1	8	14	21	−7	7	

Updated to match(es) played on September 10, 1994. Source: League Standings
Rules for classification: 1) points; 2) goal difference; 3) number of goals scored.
(C) Champions; (O) Play-off winners

== Playoffs ==
=== Quarterfinals ===
September 11, 1994	Montreal Croatia	3–5	Toronto Jets	Montreal, Quebec
		(Report)		Stadium: Stade du Parc Hérbert

September 11, 1994	London City	1–1	Scarborough Astros	London, Ontario
		(Report)		Stadium: Cove Road Stadium

September 17, 1994	Toronto Jets	5–6	Montreal Croatia	North York, Ontario
		(Report)		Stadium: Esther Shiner Stadium

September 16, 1994	Scarborough Astros	0–1	London City	Scarborough, Ontario
		(Report)		Stadium: Birchmount Stadium

=== Semifinals ===
September 1994	Toronto Jets	0–1	Toronto Italia	North York, Ontario
		(Report)		Stadium: Esther Shiner Stadium

September 30, 1994	London City	0–1	St. Catharines Roma	London, Ontario
		[ (Report)]	Mark Konert 20'	Stadium: Cove Road Stadium

October 9, 1994	Toronto Italia	0–0	Toronto Jets	Etobicoke, Ontario
		(Report)		Stadium: Centennial Park Stadium

October 2, 1994	St. Catharines Roma	3–1	London City	St. Catharines, Ontario
19:30	Tom Bernardi 1', 45'; Campbell 16'	[ (Report)]	Louie Fotia 50'	Stadium: Club Roma Stadium; Attendance: 150

=== Final ===
October 12, 1994	St. Catharines Roma	0–1	Toronto Italia	St. Catharines, Ontario
		[ (Report)]	Gamble 28'	Stadium: Club Roma Stadium; Attendance: 300

October 15, 1994	Toronto Italia	3–1	St. Catharines Roma	Etobicoke, Ontario
	Mella 1'; Vito Serafini 16'; Spadafina 21'	[ (Report)]	Gastis 10'	Stadium: Centennial Park Stadium

== Cup ==
The cup tournament was a separate contest from the rest of the season, in which all eight teams took part. All the matches were separate from the regular season, and the teams were grouped into two separate divisions. The two winners in the group stage would advance to a singles match for the Cup. Originally, Toronto Croatia participated in the cup competition, but near the conclusion of the season, withdrew from both the regular season and cup tournament.

=== Group A ===
Pos	Team	Pld	W	D	L	GF	GA	GD	Pts	Qualification
1	St. Catharines Roma (C)	4	3	0	1	5	3	+2	6	Qualification for Playoffs
2	Montreal Ramblers	4	2	1	1	8	5	+3	5	
3	Toronto Jets	4	0	1	3	4	9	−5	1	

Updated to match(es) played on September 10, 1994. Source: Cup Standings
Rules for classification: 1) points; 2) goal difference; 3) number of goals scored.
(C) Champions

=== Group B ===
Pos	Team	Pld	W	D	L	GF	GA	GD	Pts	Qualification
1	Toronto Italia	5	5	0	0	14	0	+14	10	Qualification for Playoffs
2	Montreal Croatia	5	3	1	1	6	5	+1	7	
3	London City	6	1	2	3	4	8	−4	4	
4	Scarborough Astros	6	0	1	5	1	12	−11	1	

Updated to match(es) played on September 10, 1994. Source: Cup Standings
Rules for classification: 1) points; 2) goal difference; 3) number of goals scored.

=== Final ===
14 September 1994

Toronto Italia	1–0	St. Catharines Roma
	Report

Centennial Park Stadium, Etobicoke, Ontario
21 September 1994

St. Catharines Roma	3–0	Toronto Italia
	Report

Centennial Park Stadium, Etobicoke, Ontario

== Individual awards ==
The 1994 CNSL annual awards presented only four, with Toronto Italia receiving the majority of the accolades. The Golden Boot and Rookie of the Year were given to Italia forward Ryan Gamble. Peter Pinizzotto was named the Coach of the Year after achieving a treble with Italia. He would ultimately spend time with the Toronto Lynx, and Montreal Impact. The final recipient was Scarborough Astros Brazilian import Paulo Silva, with his third Goalkeeper of the Year award.

Award	Player (Club)
CNSL Golden Boot	Ryan Gamble (Toronto Italia)
CNSL Goalkeeper of the Year Award	Paulo Silva (Scarborough Astros)
CNSL Rookie of the Year Award	Ryan Gamble (Toronto Italia)
CNSL Coach of the Year Award	Peter Pinizzotto (Toronto Italia)
