= 1990 National Soccer League season =

National Soccer League
- Season: 1990
- Champions: Toronto First Portuguese (4th title)
- League Cup: St. Catharines Roma
- Best goalkeeper: Paulo Silva

The 1990 National Soccer League season was the sixty-seventh season under the National Soccer League (NSL) name. The season concluded on September 12, 1990, with Toronto First Portuguese claiming their third NSL Championship by finishing first in the First Division. First Portuguese would also secure the NSL Canadian Championship by defeating St. Leonard of the Quebec National Soccer League on September 29, 1990, in Toronto, Ontario. The NSL Cup was won by St. Catharines Roma, and North York Strikers secured the Second Division championship.

== Overview ==
The league increased in membership and retained the majority of teams from the previous season. The league was structurally divided into two divisions, the First and Second divisions. Potential plans for a promotion and relegation system were revealed. The First Division increased to nine members while the Second Division had seven clubs. The new entry to the First Division was former NSL franchise London City, which acquired London Marconi's franchise rights. London City previously participated in the league until the 1983 season. Toronto Macedonia Stars was the lone departing club.

In early May, league commissioner Rocco Lofranco announced the league's decision to begin discussions with the Canadian Soccer League (CSL) about a potential merger. The NSL continued to serve as a player conduit for the CSL player draft. Once the season concluded, two new additions North York Strikers and Toronto International to the First Division were announced at the annual general meeting held in Toronto on December 2, 1990. Topics discussed at the general meeting were placing restrictions on any future expansion into the city of Toronto in the top division and continuing negotiations with the CSL.

=== Teams ===
Team	City	Stadium	Manager
America United	Toronto, Ontario		Manuel Bilches
Brazil '87			
Friuli	Toronto, Ontario		
Hamilton White Eagles	Hamilton, Ontario		Kevin Grant
North York Strikers	North York, Ontario	Esther Shiner Stadium	Jorge Monico
London City	London, Ontario	Cove Road Stadium	Harry Gauss
Oshawa Italia	Oshawa, Ontario		Tito Marimpietri
St. Catharines Roma	St. Catharines, Ontario	Club Roma Stadium	
Toronto First Portuguese	Toronto, Ontario	Lamport Stadium	
Toronto Croatia	Etobicoke, Ontario	Centennial Park Stadium	
Toronto Italia	Etobicoke, Ontario	Centennial Park Stadium	Carlos Salguero
Toronto Jets	Toronto, Ontario		
Toronto Panhellenic	Toronto, Ontario	Monarch Park Stadium	Spiros Papathanasakis
Toronto Virtus	Toronto, Ontario		Nino Cioppa
Windsor Wheels	Windsor, Ontario	Windsor Stadium	Nino Berisic
Woodbridge Azzurri	Vaughan, Ontario		

==== Coaching changes ====
Team	Outgoing coach	Manner of departure	Date of vacancy	Position in table	Incoming coach	Date of appointment
Toronto Italia	(Argentina) Ruben Campolo		August 13, 1990	3rd in August	(Argentina) Carlos Salguero	August 13, 1990

Location of NSL teams outside of Toronto for the 1990 NSL season.

Location of NSL teams in Toronto for the 1990 NSL season.

== Final standings ==
Pos	Team	Pld	W	D	L	GF	GA	GD	Pts	Qualification
1	Toronto First Portuguese (C)	16	11	2	3	29	6	+23	24	Qualification for Playoffs
2	Toronto Italia	16	10	2	4	38	19	+19	22	
3	St. Catharines Roma	16	9	3	4	28	16	+12	21	
4	Toronto Croatia	16	7	7	2	23	11	+12	21	
5	Toronto Panhellenic	16	7	3	6	23	25	−2	17	
6	America United	16	5	5	6	18	23	−5	15	
7	Windsor Wheels	15	4	3	8	21	19	+2	11	
8	London City	16	1	4	11	11	36	−25	6	
9	Oshawa Italia	15	1	3	11	13	37	−24	5	

Updated to match(es) played on September 13, 1990. Source:
Rules for classification: 1) points; 2) goal difference; 3) number of goals scored.
(C) Champions

== Cup ==
The cup tournament was a separate contest from the rest of the season, in which all sixteen teams took part. The matches were separate from the regular season, and the teams were grouped into four separate divisions. The NSL Cup was won by St. Catharines Roma.

=== Group A ===
Pos	Team	Pld	W	D	L	GF	GA	GD	Pts	Qualification
1	Toronto Italia	5	5	0	0	18	2	+16	10	Qualification for Playoffs
2	Hamilton	6	4	0	2	8	5	+3	8	
3	Oshawa Italia	6	2	0	4	10	11	−1	4	
4	Friuli	5	0	0	5	0	18	−18	0	

Updated to match(es) played on September 9, 2020. Source: Cup Standings
Rules for classification: 1) points; 2) goal difference; 3) number of goals scored.

=== Group B ===
Pos	Team	Pld	W	D	L	GF	GA	GD	Pts	Qualification
1	Toronto Croatia	6	4	2	0	13	4	+9	10	Qualification for Playoffs
2	St. Catharines Roma	6	4	0	2	11	6	+5	8	
3	Toronto Jets	6	0	3	3	7	12	−5	3	
4	Brazil '87	6	0	3	3	4	13	−9	3	

Updated to match(es) played on September 9, 2020. Source: Cup Standings
Rules for classification: 1) points; 2) goal difference; 3) number of goals scored.

=== Group C ===
Pos	Team	Pld	W	D	L	GF	GA	GD	Pts	Qualification
1	Toronto First Portuguese	6	5	1	0	13	4	+9	11	Qualification for Playoffs
2	Toronto Panhellenic	6	2	2	2	14	7	+7	6	
3	Toronto Virtus	6	1	2	3	8	14	−6	4	
4	Woodbridge Azzurri	6	0	3	3	7	17	−10	3	

Updated to match(es) played on September 9, 2020. Source: Cup Standings
Rules for classification: 1) points; 2) goal difference; 3) number of goals scored.

=== Group D ===
Pos	Team	Pld	W	D	L	GF	GA	GD	Pts	Qualification
1	North York Strikers	5	4	1	0	12	4	+8	9	Qualification for Playoffs
2	America United	6	3	1	2	12	8	+4	7	
3	Windsor Wheels	5	3	0	2	8	6	+2	6	
4	London City	6	0	0	6	2	16	−14	0	

Updated to match(es) played on September 9, 2020. Source: Cup Standings
Rules for classification: 1) points; 2) goal difference; 3) number of goals scored.

== NSL Canadian Championship ==
Since the 1986 season, a joint effort was conducted between the Pacific Rim Soccer League of British Columbia, the National Soccer League, and the Quebec National Soccer League to provide a national champion. Their regional champions would face each other in a singles match for the championship. The Pacific Rim Soccer League participated in the first tournament but ceased operations in 1987. While their league cup champions would compete for the NSL Canada Cup.

=== Finals ===
September 29, 1990	Toronto First Portuguese	4–2	Corfinium St-Leonard	Toronto, Ontario
		Report
