= 1993 Canadian National Soccer League season =

Canadian National Soccer League
- Season: 1993
- Champions: Montreal Croatia (Eastern Division) Toronto Rockets (Western Division); St. Catharines Roma (playoffs, 1st title)
- League cup: Toronto Croatia
- Matches: 112
- Goals: 358 (3.2 per match)
- Top goalscorer: Dwayne Dear; Tomasz Radzinski (15)
- Best goalkeeper: Charlie Mohamed

The 1993 Canadian National Soccer League season was the seventy-first season for the Canadian National Soccer League. The season concluded on October 17, 1993, with St. Catharines Roma claiming their first CNSL Championship after defeating Toronto Rockets in a two-game series. Toronto Croatia secured their fifth CNSL league cup.

The season was significant, as the Canadian Soccer League (CSL) merged with the National Soccer League (NSL), which renamed the league the Canadian National Soccer League (CNSL). As the Canadian Soccer Association suspended the CSL on April 30, 1993, their remaining clubs joined the CNSL. The new additions included the Winnipeg Fury, which marked the league's first entry into Manitoba, and the reintroduction of a Quebec division, making the league operative in three provinces.

== Overview ==
After the defections of the Toronto Blizzard and Vancouver 86ers to the American Professional Soccer League, the main financial sponsor of the Montreal Supra split with the front office to form another APSL franchise. These actions, along with the financial crisis the Canadian Soccer League was experiencing, caused the league to merge its interests with the National Soccer League. The merger resulted in a name change to the Canadian National Soccer League with the additions of the North York Rockets (changed to Toronto Rockets), Winnipeg Fury, and the introduction of a Quebec division to house the former Quebec National Soccer League (LNSQ) clubs. As a result of the changes to the Canadian soccer landscape, the Canadian Soccer Association recognized the APSL as the top tier in the country with the intention of designating the CNSL as a secondary league. After a meeting conducted with representatives from both parties, the CNSL failed to receive sanctioning from the CSA.

On April 30, 1993, the CSA officially suspended the CSL for one season, with the CSL in response sanctioning the CNSL for the 1993 season. Woodbridge Azzuri was suspended after failing to secure a proper facility according to league standards. The executive committee of the league included Laurie McIvor as president, Rocco LoFranco as commissioner, Armando DiFruscio as vice president, and Harry Gauss with Tony Fontana as directors. Winnipeg experienced a tumultuous season in terms of fiscal operations as it struggled to make payments, and even applied to the provincial government for a grant to fulfill its league commitments.

=== Teams ===
Team	City	Stadium	Manager
Corfinium St-Leonard	Saint-Léonard de Port Maurice, Quebec		
Cosmos de LaSalle	LaSalle, Quebec	Riverside Stadium	Angelo Poulos
London City	London, Ontario	Cove Road Stadium	
Luso Stars Mont-Royal	Mount Royal, Quebec		
Montreal Croatia	Montreal, Quebec	Stade du Parc Hérbert	Simon Demo
Montreal Ramblers	Montreal, Quebec	Complexe sportif Claude-Robillard	
Richmond Hill Kick (Note: Richmond Hill withdrew from league midway through the season)	Richmond Hill, Ontario	Richmond Green Sports Centre	Peter Pinizzotto
Scarborough Astros	Scarborough, Ontario	Birchmount Stadium	Jorge Armua
St. Catharines Roma	St. Catharines, Ontario	Club Roma Stadium	Jimmy Douglas
Toronto Croatia	Etobicoke, Ontario	Centennial Park Stadium	
Toronto Italia	Etobicoke, Ontario	Centennial Park Stadium	Carlo Delmonte
Toronto Jets	North York, Ontario	Esther Shiner Stadium	Adam Pagliaroli
Toronto Rockets	North York, Ontario	Esther Shiner Stadium	
Windsor Wheels	Windsor, Ontario	Windsor Stadium	Peter Paglioti
Winnipeg Fury	Winnipeg, Manitoba	Winnipeg Soccer Complex	Phil Wilson

==== Coaching changes ====
Team	Outgoing coach	Manner of departure	Date of vacancy	Position in table	Incoming coach	Date of appointment
St. Catharines Roma	Tony Novacic	Resigned	March, 1993	Presason	Jimmy Douglas	March 10, 1993
Winnipeg Fury	Tom McManus	Resigned	April 10, 1993		(England) Phil Wilson	April 10, 1993
Windsor Wheels	Osvaldo Rizzo	Dismissed	May 26, 1993	2nd in May	(United States) Peter Paglioti	May 27, 1993
Toronto Italia	(Croatia) Bruno Pilaš	Resigned	July 16, 1993	6th in July	Carlo Delmonte	July 16, 1993

Canadian National Soccer League clubs
Location of teams in Toronto for the 1993 CNSL season

== Final standings ==
=== Eastern Division ===
Pos	Team	Pld	W	D	L	GF	GA	GD	Pts	Qualification
1	Montreal Croatia (C)	16	9	4	3	47	20	+27	22	Qualification for Playoffs
2	Cosmos de LaSalle	16	7	3	6	48	25	+23	17	Qualification for Playoffs
3	Montreal Ramblers	16	6	5	5	27	31	−4	17	
4	Corfinium St-Leonard	16	6	3	7	28	41	−13	15	
5	Luso Stars Mont-Royal	16	1	5	10	13	51	−38	7	

Updated to match(es) played on September 25, 1993. Source:
Rules for classification: 1) points; 2) goal difference; 3) number of goals scored.
(C) Champions

=== Western Division ===
Pos	Team	Pld	W	D	L	GF	GA	GD	Pts	Qualification
1	Toronto Rockets (C)	16	9	6	1	40	13	+27	24	Qualification for Playoffs
2	Toronto Croatia	16	7	7	2	19	10	+9	21	Qualification for Playoffs
3	Toronto Italia	16	6	6	4	21	14	+7	18	Qualification for Playoffs
4	St. Catharines Roma (O)	16	7	2	7	17	16	+1	16	Qualification for Playoffs
5	Toronto Jets	16	4	6	6	15	20	−5	14	Qualification for Playoffs
6	London City	16	5	4	7	19	26	−7	14	Qualification for Playoffs
7	Scarborough Astros	16	6	2	8	16	26	−10	14	
8	Windsor Wheels	16	7	0	9	16	31	−15	14	
9	Winnipeg Fury	16	4	1	11	22	28	−6	9	

Updated to match(es) played on September 25, 1993. Source:
Rules for classification: 1) points; 2) goal difference; 3) number of goals scored.
(C) Champions; (O) Play-off winners

== Playoffs ==
=== Quarterfinals ===
September 26, 1993	Toronto Rockets	3–0	London City	North York, Ontario
		[ Report]		Stadium: Esther Shiner Stadium

September 29, 1993	London City	0–2	Toronto Rockets	London, Ontario
		[ Report]		Stadium: Cove Road Stadium

Toronto won the series 5–0 on aggregate.

September 27, 1993	Montreal Croatia	5–1	Cosmos de LaSalle	Montreal, Quebec
		[ Report]		Stadium: Stade du Parc Hérbert

September 30, 1993	Cosmos de LaSalle	1–3	Montreal Croatia	LaSalle, Quebec
		[ Report]		Stadium: Riverside Stadium

Montreal won the series 8–2 on aggregate.

September 27, 1993	Toronto Jets	2–2	Toronto Croatia	North York, Ontario
		[ Report]		Stadium: Esther Shiner Stadium

September 29, 1993	Toronto Croatia	1–2	Toronto Jets	Etobicoke, Ontario
		[ Report]		Stadium: Centennial Park Stadium

Toronto Jets won the series 4–3 on aggregate.

September 29, 1993	St. Catharines Roma	2–2	Toronto Italia	St. Catharines, Ontario
	Zoran Zubic 22'; 52'	[ Report]	Luis Luffi 21'; Titus 47'	Stadium: Club Roma Stadium; Referee: Joe Licandro

October 4, 1993	Toronto Italia	1–2	St. Catharines Roma	Etobicoke, Ontario
		[ Report]		Stadium: Centennial Park Stadium

St. Catharines won the series 4–3 on aggregate.

=== Semifinals ===
October 3, 1993	Montreal Croatia	1–2	Toronto Rockets	Montreal, Quebec
		[ Report]		Stadium: Stade du Parc Hérbert

October 10, 1993	Toronto Rockets	4–0	Montreal Croatia	North York, Ontario
		[ Report]		Stadium: Esther Shiner Stadium

Toronto won the series 6–1 on aggregate.

October 7, 1993	Toronto Jets	0–1	St. Catharines Roma	North York, Ontario
		[ Report]	Zoran Zubic 18'	Stadium: Esther Shiner Stadium

October 13, 1993	St. Catharines Roma	1–0	Toronto Jets	St. Catharines, Ontario
	Mark Konert 94'	[ Report]		Stadium: Club Roma Stadium; Attendance: 600

St. Catharines won the series 2–0 on aggregate.

=== Final ===
October 15, 1993	St. Catharines Roma	0–0	Toronto Rockets	St. Catharines, Ontario
		[ Report]		Stadium: Club Roma Stadium; Attendance: 250

October 17, 1993	Toronto Rockets	0–1	St. Catharines Roma	Etobicoke, Ontario
		[ Report]	Tom Bernardi 19'	Stadium: Centennial Park Stadium

St. Catharines won the series 1–0 on aggregate.

== Cup ==
The cup tournament was a separate contest from the rest of the season, in which all fourteen teams took part. All the matches were separate from the regular season, and the teams were grouped into two separate divisions.

=== Finals ===
September 17, 1993	London City	1–1	Toronto Croatia	London, Ontario
		[ Report]		Stadium: Cove Road Stadium

September 22, 1993	Toronto Croatia	4–0	London City	Etobicoke, Ontario
		[ Report]		Stadium: Centennial Park Stadium

Toronto won the series 5–1 on aggregate.

== Individual awards ==
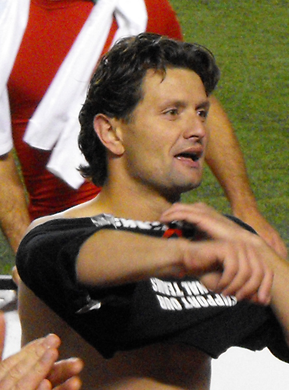
Canadian international Tomasz Radzinski played two seasons in the CNSL

The 1993 annual CNSL awards were held at Auberge Universel in Sherbrooke, Quebec, with the nominations announced on October 22, 1993. The awards were presented on November 3, 1993, with Montreal Croatia receiving the most accolades. The Golden Boot was shared between Dwayne Dear and Tomasz Radzinski, with both finishing with 15 goals in their respective divisions. Radzinski would ultimately play in noted leagues such as the Belgian First Division and Premier League. Montreal Croatia's Zoran Petkovic was named the MVP, and Krunoslav Piperkovic was given the Most Sportsmanlike Award.

After securing the Eastern division title for Croatia, the Coach of the Year award went to Simon Demo, along with the Team of the Year award. The Montreal Ramblers finished second with three awards, with Charlie Mohamed being named the Goalkeeper of the Year, and Paul Daccobert was recognized as the Rookie of the Year and would later play in the USISL Pro League. The Ramblers also received the Most Technical award, while Corfinium St-Leonard received the Most Improved award. The remainder of the awards went to Cosmos de LaSalle as Best Administration, and Manuel Sosa was given the Best Referee award.

Award	Player (Club)
CNSL MVP	Zoran Petkovic (Montreal Croatia)
CNSL Golden Boot	Dwayne Dear (Cosmos de LaSalle); Tomasz Radzinski (Toronto Rockets)
CNSL Goalkeeper of the Year Award	Charlie Mohamed (Montreal Ramblers)
CNSL Rookie of the Year Award	Paul Daccobert (Montreal Ramblers)
CNSL Coach of the Year Award	Simon Demo (Montreal Croatia)
CNSL Most Sportsmanlike Award	Krunoslav Piperkovic (Montreal Croatia)
CNSL Most Technical Award	Montreal Ramblers
CNSL Most Improved Award	Corfinium St-Leonard
CNSL Team of the Year Award	Montreal Croatia
CNSL Best Administration Award	Cosmos de LaSalle
CNSL Referee Award	Manuel Sousa
