= Cameron Walker (soccer) =

Canadian soccer player

Cam Walker
Personal information
- Full name: Cameron Walker
- Place of birth: Canada
- Position: Forward

Senior career*
Years	Team	Apps	(Gls)
1986	Toronto Blizzard		
1988–1992	Montreal Supra	80	(8)
1993	Montreal Impact	10	(2)
1995	St. Catharines Wolves	2	(0)
- * Club domestic league appearances and goals

Cameron Walker is a Canadian former soccer player who played in the Canadian Soccer League, American Professional Soccer League, and the Canadian National Soccer League.

== Playing career ==
In 1986, he played in the National Soccer League with Toronto Blizzard. Walker played in the Canadian Soccer League in 1988 with the Montreal Supra. He would play with the organization for five seasons, and qualified with the club for the postseason for the last three seasons. After CSL ceased operations he signed with the newly formed Montreal Impact of the American Professional Soccer League in 1993. In his debut season with the Impact he featured in 10 matches and recorded two goals.

In 1995, he signed with St. Catharines Wolves of the Canadian National Soccer League. During his tenure with the Wolves he won a treble by winning the regular season championship, Umbro Cup, and CNSL Championship. During the CNSL Championship match he contributed a goal in a 2-1 victory over the Toronto Jets.
