= St. John Henry Newman Catholic Secondary School =

Canadian Catholic secondary school

Location
- 127 Gray Road; Stoney Creek, Ontario, L8G 3V3; Canada; 43°13′19″N 79°44′43″W

Information
- School type: Public, separate secondary school
- Motto: To Grow is to Change
- Religious affiliation: Catholic
- Established: 1975; 51 years ago
- School board: Hamilton-Wentworth Catholic District School Board
- Superintendent: Tracey Ferrie
- Area trustee: Aldo D’Intino; Mary Nardini
- School number: 694134
- Principal: Anthony Macaluso
- Chaplain: Kimberly Pastrak
- Grades: 9–12
- Enrolment: 1,550 (2020)
- Campus type: Suburban
- Colours: Red and blue
- Mascot: Skippy
- Team name: Cardinals
- Website: Official website

St. John Henry Newman Catholic Secondary School is a Catholic secondary school located in the community of Stoney Creek in Hamilton. It is part of the Hamilton-Wentworth Catholic District School Board and is known for its sports teams as well as its various stage performances.

== History ==
Established in 1975 as Cardinal Newman Catholic Secondary School, the school was named after John Henry Newman. According to The Fraser Institute's research of Ontario High Schools in 2010, Cardinal Newman ranked in the top 10th percentile of top rated secondary schools in Ontario, and in 2015, was named one of two highest rated schools in the Greater Hamilton Area.

In October 2019, the school was renamed to St. John Henry Newman Catholic Secondary School following Newman's canonization in the Roman Catholic Church.

== Notable alumni ==
- Andrea Horwath – Mayor of Hamilton, Ontario
- Eric Mezzalira – linebacker for the Calgary Stampeders
- Lou Nagy – North American Soccer League soccer player
- Paul Popowich – actor
- Matthew Schaefer - defenceman for the New York Islanders

== See also ==
- Education in Ontario
- List of secondary schools in Ontario
