= Joe Ciaravino =

Canadian soccer player

Personal information
- Full name: Giuseppe Ciaravino
- Date of birth: October 26, 1976 (age 50)
- Place of birth: Toronto, Ontario, Canada
- Height: 6 ft 2 in (1.88 m)
- Position: Goalkeeper

Senior career*
Years	Team	Apps	(Gls)
1992–1993	North York Azzuri		
1995	Toronto Jets		
1996	Toronto Italia		
1997	Toronto Lynx	10	(0)

International career
1992–1993	Canada U17	8	(0)
- * Club domestic league appearances and goals as of 26 August 2019

Joe Ciaravino (born October 26, 1976) is a Canadian former soccer player who played as goalkeeper who played in the Canadian National Soccer League, USL A-League, and at the international level with the Canada men's national under-17 soccer team.

== Club career ==
Ciaravino played with North York Azzuri in 1992. He later played with the Toronto Jets in the Canadian National Soccer League. His signing was announced on July 2, 1995, along with the rest of the team's roster. In the 1995 season the Jets achieved a regular season championship by placing first in the standings. In the postseason the Jets reached the finals of the playoffs, but were defeated by St. Catharines Wolves by a score of 2–1. On October 5, 1995, he was awarded the Goalkeeper of the Year award.

In 1996, he signed a contract with the Toronto Italia; he made his debut on June 2, 1996, in a match against St. Catharines. He played in the 1996 CNSL All-Star match with Italia, which included Diego Maradona in the roster. He added a treble to his resume by winning the Umbro Cup along with the Playoff Championship. He managed to achieve an undefeated season with Toronto along with their treble victory. For the second time in his career he was awarded the Goalkeeper of the Year award.

In 1997, Ciaravino signed with expansion franchise the Toronto Lynx of the USL A-League, where he was reunited with his old Toronto Italia head coach Peter Pinizzotto. His signing was in April 1997 in a press conference which revealed the club's roster for the 1997 season. He made his debut for the club on April 19, 1997, in a match against the Charleston Battery which resulted in 4–2 defeat. Ciaravino assisted the club in qualifying for the post season for the first time in the franchise's history, by finishing 4th in the Northeastern division. The Lynx were eliminated in the first round of the playoffs against the Montreal Impact.

== International career ==
Ciaravino made his debut for the Canada men's national under-17 soccer team on August 12, 1992, against the Cayman Islands U-17 in the 1992 CONCACAF U-17 Tournament. In the tournament Canada finished third, and qualified for the 1993 FIFA U-17 World Championship. He featured in the tournament against Nigeria, and Australia.
