= Phil Caporella =

Canadian soccer player

Personal information
- Full name: Philip Caporella
- Position: Striker

Senior career*
| Years | Team | Apps | (Gls) |
| 1996 | Toronto Italia | 12 | (10) |
| 1997–1998 | Toronto Lynx | 39 | (6) |
| 1998 | Montreal Impact | 1 | (0) |
| 1999 | Connecticut Wolves | 12 | (1) |
| 1999–2000 | Toronto Olympians | 13 | (5) |
- * Club domestic league appearances and goals as of 28 December 2014

Phil Caporella is a former Canadian soccer player who played the majority of his career in the USL A-League and with several Canadian clubs.

== Playing career ==
Caporella played in the Canadian National Soccer League with the Toronto Rockets in 1993.

In 1996, he played with Toronto Italia of the Canadian National Soccer League. He made his debut for Italia on June 2, 1996, in a CNSL cup match against St. Catharines Wolves, where he scored a goal to tie the game as a 1–1 draw. Throughout the season he appeared in 12 matches and scored ten goals. He added a Treble (association football) to his resume by winning the Regular League Championship, the CNSL domestic, and the Playoff Championship. Caporella featured in the Playoff Championship finals match against St. Catharines, where Italia defeated the Wolves by 11-0 goals on aggregate. In 1997, Caporella signed with an expansion franchise the Toronto Lynx of the USL A-League, where he was reunited with his old Toronto Italia head coach Peter Pinizzotto. His signing was in April 1997 in a press conference which revealed the club's roster for the 1997 season. He made his debut for the club on April 12, 1997, in a 3–1 defeat to the Jacksonville Cyclones. Caporella assisted the club in qualifying for the post season for the first time in the franchise's history, by finishing 4th in the Northeastern division. The Lynx were eliminated in the first round of the playoffs against the Montreal Impact. He returned to the Lynx the following year where he appeared in 25 matches and scored 2 goals, but on August 27, 1998, he was traded to the Montreal Impact for future considerations and an undisclosed amount of cash.

In Montreal Caporella appeared in one match for the club the team managed to secure a playoff berth by finishing second in the Northeastern division. The following season he went abroad to the United States to sign with the Connecticut Wolves. He appeared in 19 matches and scored 1 goal with the Wolves, but the team performed poorly throughout the season finishing lost in their division. When the USL A-League season came to a conclusion, Caporella signed with the Toronto Olympians of the Canadian Professional Soccer League. He made his debut on September 3, 1999, in an Open Canada Cup match against St. Catharines Wolves. Though he joined the Olympians late in the season he contributed in the club's second consecutive undefeated season which allowed them to claim the regular season championship; the first club to reach that milestone in the league's history. Within that year he managed to win a Treble with the club by claiming the Open Canada Cup, CPSL Championship, and the League championship. During the 2000 season, Caporella was again instrumental in Toronto's exceptionally successful campaign where he led the Olympians to a 10-game undefeated streak, as well as claiming the Open Canada Cup in the process. The victory in claiming the Open Cup marked the first time in the league's history a club winning the trophy three consecutive years in a row. Though he did manage to lead his team to the playoff finals, they were defeated by Toronto Croatia by a score of 2–1.

== Honors ==
=== Toronto Olympians ===
- CPSL Championship (1): 1999
- Open Canada Cup (2): 1999, 2000
- Canadian Professional Soccer League Regular Season Champions (2): 1999, 2000
