= Toronto Track and Field Centre =

Athletic training centre in Toronto, Ontario

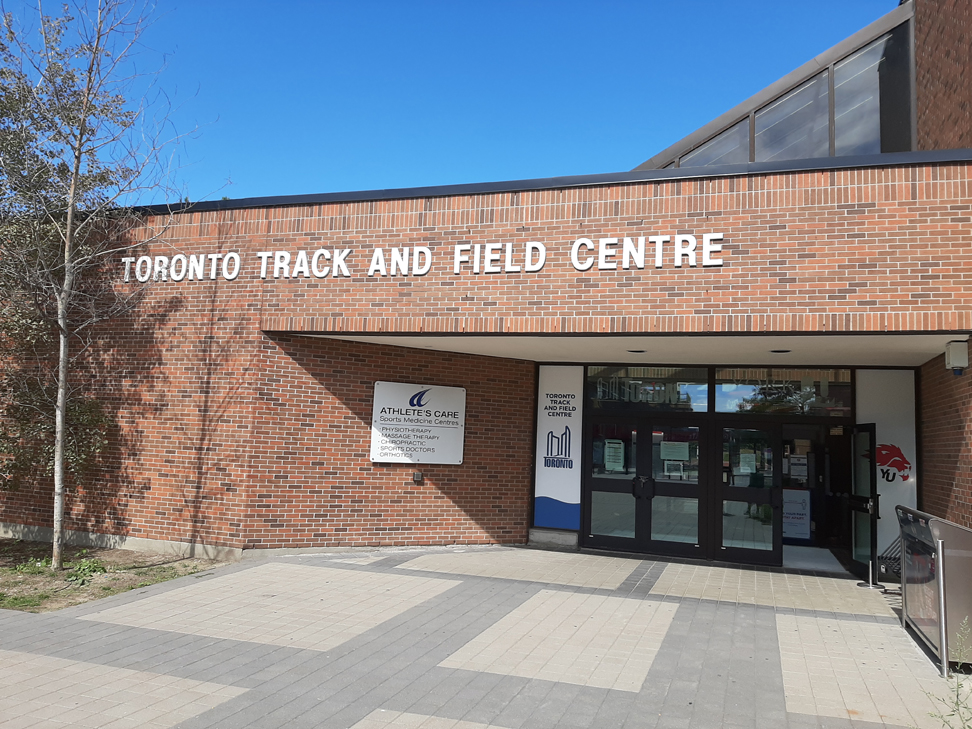
- The training centre pictured in 2021

- Location within Toronto Location within Ontario Location within Canada
- Address: 231 Ian MacDonald Blvd. Canada
- Location: Toronto, Ontario
- Coordinates: 43°46′39″N 79°30′26″W
- Type: multi-facility indoor and outdoor athletic complex
- Acreage: 14
- Public transit: Pioneer Village station

Construction
- Opened: 1979

Website
- www.toronto.ca/data/parks/prd/facilities/complex/460/index.html

The Toronto Track and Field Centre is a city-owned athletic training centre in Toronto, Ontario, Canada. Prior to 1998 it was called Metro Toronto Track and Field Centre. It is located at York University's Keele campus in the north-west section of the city.

== Description ==
The facility, while located at York, is not part of York University. The operation and programming of this facility is co-ordinated by a committee with members representing the City of Toronto, York University and the track and field community. It is home to the York Lions Track and Field Team and the York University Track Club. Opened in 1979, the facility is used by both professional and amateur athletes.

The indoor centre features:

- five-lane 200 metre banked oval track
- eight-lane 100 metre sprint/hurdle runway with photo-timers booth
- pole vaulting area (10 metre clearance)
- two long jump/triple jump runways
- two high jump areas
- discus throwing area with curtain
- shot-put throwing circle
- warm-up area
- three-lane 30 metre warm-up, sprint and hurdle runways
- training facility containing light, heavy, and Olympic free weights
- two universal gyms
- two meeting rooms
- observation gallery
- locker rooms with showers
- first aid area

The outdoor centre features:

- eight-lane rubberized 400 metre Olympic regulation track with two 125-metre sprint/hurdle runways, adjustable steeple chase barriers
- full outdoor facilities for track meets
- outdoor photo-timers booth with public address system
- 16,000-square-metre (170,000 sq ft) practice throwing paddock for javelin, discus, shot-put, and hammer events
- Alan Eagleson Sports Injuries Clinic

== See also ==
- Birchmount Stadium
- Centennial Park Stadium
- Esther Shiner Stadium
- Lamport Stadium
- Monarch Park Stadium
- Rosedale Field
- Varsity Stadium
- York Lions Stadium
