= Lou Nagy =

Canadian retired soccer forward (born 1960)

Personal information
- Full name: Lajos Nagy
- Date of birth: May 9, 1960 (age 66)
- Place of birth: Hamilton, Ontario, Canada
- Position: Forward

Youth career
- 1979: Laurentian University

Senior career*
Years	Team	Apps	(Gls)
1979	Toronto Blizzard	0	(0)
1979	Hamilton Italo-Canadians		
1980	Atlanta Chiefs	3	(0)
1980–1981	Denver Avalanche (indoor)	13	(6)
1981–1985	Baltimore Blast (indoor)	104	(36)
1986	Hamilton Steelers		
1988	Hamilton Steelers	2	(0)
1995	Hamilton White Eagles		

International career
1979	Canada U-20	3	(1)

Managerial career
- 1995: Hamilton White Eagles
- * Club domestic league appearances and goals

Lajos "Lou" Nagy (born May 9, 1960) is a Canadian retired soccer forward who played professionally in the North American Soccer League and Major Indoor Soccer League.

== Career ==
In 1978, Nagy graduated from Cardinal Newman Secondary School. He attended Laurentian University, where he was a 1979 First Team All-Canadian soccer player. In 1979, he signed with the Toronto Blizzard of the North American Soccer League. He never cracked the first team before moving to the Atlanta Chiefs for the 1980 NASL season. He also played in the National Soccer League in 1979 with Hamilton Italo-Canadians. He saw time in a handful of games before moving indoors with the Denver Avalanche of the Major Indoor Soccer League in the fall of 1980.

The Avalanche traded him to the Baltimore Blast during the season. The Blast released him in the spring of 1985. In 1986, he played for the Hamilton Steelers as they won the Canadian National Championship. HE played again in 1988. In 1995, he returned to the Canadian National Soccer League to play with Hamilton White Eagles.

In 2013, he was inducted into the Hamilton Soccer Hall of Fame.

== International career ==
In 1979, Nagy was a member of the Canada men's national under-20 soccer team which went 1-2-0 at the 1979 FIFA World Youth Championship. He played all three Canadian games in the tournament, scoring one goal.

== Managerial career ==
In 1995, Nagy managed in the Canadian National Soccer League with Hamilton White Eagles, where he served as a player-coach. He served as a head coach for Cardinal Newman Cardinals, and with Hamilton Greek Olympics. He is currently the technical director for Ancaster Soccer Club.
