= Shayne Campbell =

Canadian soccer player

Personal information
- Full name: Shayne Campbell
- Date of birth: November 18, 1972 (age 53)
- Place of birth: Guelph, Ontario
- Position: Defender

Senior career*
Years	Team	Apps	(Gls)
1994–1996	St. Catharines Wolves		
1996–2000	Edmonton Drillers (indoor)	154	(12)
1998	Hampton Roads Mariners	25	(0)
1999	St. Catharines Wolves		
2000–2002	Philadelphia KiXX (indoor)	43	(4)
2001–2002	Cleveland Crunch )indoor)	17	(2)
2003	Mississauga Olympians		

Managerial career
- 2014–2017: Guelph Gryphons (assistant coach)
- 2017–: Guelph Gryphons (head coach)
- * Club domestic league appearances and goals

Shayne Campbell (born November 18, 1972) is a former Canadian soccer player who played in Canadian National Soccer League, USL A-League, National Professional Soccer League, Major Indoor Soccer League, and the Canadian Professional Soccer League.

== Playing career ==
Campbell began his career in 1994 with St. Catharines Wolves of the Canadian National Soccer League. In 1995, he helped the club achieve a treble, winning the Umbro Cup by defeating the Scarborough Astros on a penalty shootout. In the playoff finals the Wolves defeated the Toronto Jets by a score of 2–1. In 1996, he signed with the Edmonton Drillers of the National Professional Soccer League. During his tenure with Edmonton he served with the club for four seasons and appeared in 154 matches and recorded 12 goals. Overall he had a successful time with Edmonton finishing runners-up three times in their division, and winning the Conference title in the 1998/1999 season. In 1998, he signed with Hampton Roads Mariners of the USL A-League. He finished third in the Atlantic Division, and qualified for the postseason.

Campbell returned to St. Catharines for the 1999 season, but failed to clinch a postseason by finishing sixth in the standings. In 2000, he signed with Philadelphia KiXX where he appeared in 43 matches, and scored four goals. In the 2001/2002 indoor season, he was transferred to the Cleveland Crunch where he appeared in 17 matches, and recorded two goals. In 2003, he signed with Mississauga Olympians of the Canadian Professional Soccer League. During his time with Mississauga he failed to clinch a playoff berth by finishing sixth in the Western Conference.

After retiring from competitive soccer he was hired assistant coach under Randy Ragan for the Guelph Gryphons women's soccer team. Campbell became the head coach in the spring of 2017, and led the team fto their first-ever OUA championship. He later earned OUA West Coach of the Year honors in 2018 and again in 2022.
