= Adolfo Mella =

Canadian soccer player

Personal information
- Full name: Adolpho Mella
- Place of birth: Montreal, Quebec, Canada
- Position: Midfielder

Senior career*
Years	Team	Apps	(Gls)
1991	Toronto Blizzard	1	(0)
1996–1997	Toronto Supra		
1996–1997	Toronto Shooting Stars (indoor)	40	(37)
1997–1998	Montreal Impact (indoor)	26	(21)
1997–1998	Milwaukee Wave (indoor)	26	(21)
1998	Toronto Lynx	9	(1)
1998–1999	Milwaukee Wave (indoor)	22	(20)
2000–2001	Toronto Thunderhawks (indoor)	19	(27)
2001–2005	Brampton Hitmen		
2006	Toronto Supra Portuguese	20	(1)
2007	Toronto Croatia	2	(0)
2008	Brampton Lions	7	(1)

International career
2008	Canada Futsal	6	(1)
- * Club domestic league appearances and goals

Adolfo Mella is a Canadian former soccer player who played in the USL A-League, Canadian Professional Soccer League, and the National Professional Soccer League.

== Playing career ==
Mella played a match with the Toronto Blizzard in 1991. Mella played with Richmond Hill Kick in 1992 in the National Soccer League. He signed with Toronto Supra for the 1996 season. During the 1996 season he was selected for the CNSL All-Star team against Toronto Italia which featured Diego Maradona. In 1997, he helped Supra reach the playoffs where he scored two goals for Toronto in their 8-1 victory on goals on aggravate over Toronto Croatia. In finals the club faced St. Catharines Wolves, where in the final match Mella scored a goal but Supra failed to bounce back from a 4-3 defeat.

During the 1996 winter season he featured in the National Professional Soccer League with the Toronto Shooting Stars, where he holds the franchise's all-time goalscorer record with 37 goals. In 1997, he had a tenure with Montreal Impact during their 1997-1998 winter indoor season appearing in 26 matches and recording 21 goals. Mella signed with Toronto Lynx of the USL A-League in 1998. He made his debut for the club on July 19, 1998 in a match against Rochester Rhinos. He scored his first for the organization on August 23, 1998 against his former club Montreal Impact in a 2-1 victory.

In the 1998-1999 winter season he signed with Milwaukee Wave, and in 2000 he signed with expansion franchise Toronto ThunderHawks. The following year Mella signed with the Brampton Hitmen in the Canadian Professional Soccer League. During his term with Brampton he won the CPSL Championship after defeating Vaughan Sun Devils in the playoff finals by a score of 1-0. In 2006, Mella returned to his former club the Toronto Supra Portuguese for the 2006 CSL season. He made his debut for the organization in a friendly match S.C. Braga. He helped Supra finish fourth in the International Division and secured a postseason berth. He featured in the quarterfinal match against the Serbian White Eagles FC, but were eliminated from the competition by a score of 3-0. He had a stint with Toronto Croatia for the 2007 CSL season. During his tenure with Toronto he won the Croatian World Club Championship, and concluded his career with the Brampton Lions in 2009.

== International career ==
Mella played for the Canada national futsal team, where he made six appearances and recorded one goal. He made his debut for Canada on May 31, 2008 against Ukraine national futsal team. He was selected to represent the Canada in the 2008 Grand Prix de Futsal.

== Honours ==
Brampton Hitmen

- CPSL Championship: 1

2003
