= Ruben Campolo =

Argentine footballer and manager

Personal information
- Position: Goalkeeper

Senior career*
Years	Team	Apps	(Gls)
- Chacarita Juniors
1979	Memphis Rogues		
- * Club domestic league appearances and goals

Ruben Campolo is an Argentine former footballer and football manager who played as a goalkeeper.

== Career ==
Campolo played Chacarita Juniors and had stints in Belgium and Germany. In 1979, he played in the North American Soccer League with Memphis Rogues. He made his debut for Memphis on April 14, 1979, against Detroit Express. In 1989, he served as an assistant coach for Montreal Supra in the Canadian Soccer League. In 1990, he was named the head coach for Toronto Italia in the National Soccer League.
