= Hamilton White Eagles =

Canadian soccer team

- Full name: Hamilton White Eagles
- Founded: 1990
- Dissolved: 1997
- Stadium: Brian Timmis Stadium; Hamilton, Ontario
- League: Canadian National Soccer League

Hamilton White Eagles was a soccer club based in Hamilton, Ontario. The club was formed in 1990 and competed in the Canadian National Soccer League (CNSL). After a single season in the CNSL, the White Eagles departed and became a member of the Canadian International Soccer League (CISL). Though they returned to the CNSL for the 1997 season, but were suspended and ceased operations at the conclusion of the season.

Hamilton played their home matches at Brian Timmis Stadium in Hamilton, Ontario.

== History ==
The reemergence of professional soccer in Hamilton occurred in 1995 when the Hamilton White Eagles were granted a franchise in the Canadian National Soccer League. The White Eagles represented the Serbian community in the Hamilton–Wentworth region. The Hamilton Steelers previously represented Hamilton originally in the National Soccer League, and later in the Canadian Soccer League (CSL) until the 1991 season. The team was coached by Lucio Bravo, and the roster consisted of a mixture of imports from Yugoslavia, and local young players. Goran Beader was initially appointed the team captain, but later was replaced by Sasa Vukovic. The White Eagles failed to make an impact in their debut season as they struggled in assembling a consistent squad, which resulted in the team finishing at the bottom of the standings.

The following season Hamilton joined the Canadian International Soccer League (CISL). The White Eagles' entry into the CISL reignited the noted Toronto Croatia-Serbia derby as Toronto Croatia was a club member, which in one instance caused a riot in the parking lot of Brian Timmis Stadium between both supporters in one of their derby matches. In response, the league and club officials increased the amount of security in future matches. The club managed to finish first in the league cup standings. In 1997, the CISL merged with the CNSL which resulted in Hamilton returning to play in the 1997 CNSL season.

Their return to the CNSL concluded in a controversial matter as Hamilton was suspended for the last half of the season. The primary reason for their suspension revolved around the failure of club officials to instill disciplinary actions toward the team as the White Eagles continually harassed the match officials. After an emergency league meeting, the owners approved a revised schedule and the suspension of Hamilton for the remainder of the season. The team failed to return to the professional scene the following season.

== Head coaches ==
- Kevin Grant (1990)
- Lucio Bravo (1995)
- Lou Nagy (1995)

== Seasons ==
Season	League	Teams	Record	Rank	Playoffs	Ref
1995	Canadian National Soccer League	6	1–1–7	6th	–	
1996	Canadian International Soccer League	6	5–6–4	4th	–	
1997	Canadian National Soccer League	suspended from competition				
