= Michele Gioia =

Italian footballer

Personal information
- Date of birth: 31 July 1971 (age 55)
- Place of birth: Pisticci, Italy
- Position: Striker

Senior career*
Years	Team	Apps	(Gls)
1987–1988	Reggio Audace F.C.		
1989–1990	Spezia Calcio	8	(0)
1991–1992	Calcio Lecco 1912		
1994	Toronto Jets		
1996	Toronto Italia		
1997	Montreal Impact	6	(0)
1997	Toronto Lynx	10	(4)
1999–2001	A.S. Materasassi	18	(8)
- * Club domestic league appearances and goals

Michele Gioia (born 31 July 1971) is an Italian former footballer.

== Playing career ==
Gioia began in Serie C1 for the 1987–88 season with Reggio Audace F.C. The following season he signed with Spezia Calcio, where he played in the 1989–90 Coppa Italia against Inter Milan in the first round. In 1991, he played in the Lega Pro Seconda Divisione with Calcio Lecco 1912. In 1994, he played abroad in the Canadian National Soccer League with the Toronto Jets. In 1996, he played with Toronto Italia after they merged with the Toronto Jets.

In his debut season with Italia he finished as the league's top goalscorer, and helped produce a perfect season. He featured in the CNSL All-Star match for Italia which included Diego Maradona. He was also given the league's MVP award. In 1997, he signed with the Montreal Impact in the USISL A-League. In the middle of the season he was acquired by the Toronto Lynx, and recorded his first goals on 24 August 1997 against Long Island Rough Riders.

In 1999, he played in the Eccellenza Basilicata with A.S. Materasassi.
