= Ryan Gamble (soccer) =

South African soccer player

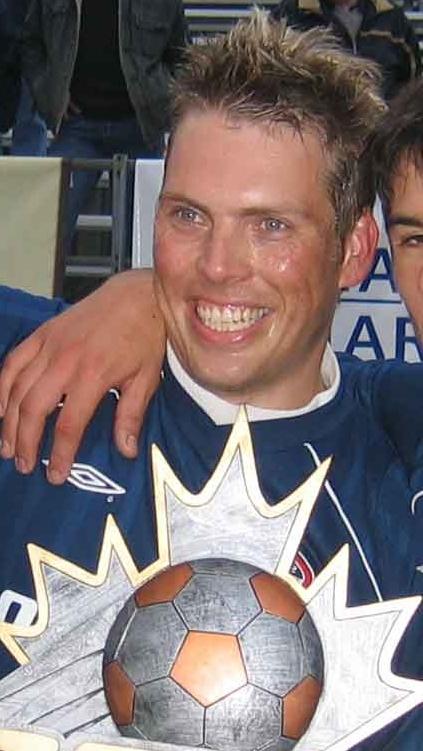
- Ryan Gamble in 2005

Personal information
- Full name: Ryan Gamble
- Date of birth: 22 November 1972 (age 53)
- Place of birth: South Africa
- Position: Forward

Senior career*
Years	Team	Apps	(Gls)
1994–1996	Toronto Italia		
1997	San Francisco Bay Seals	4	(1)
1997	Toronto Lynx	1	(0)
2001–2002	Toronto Supra	25	(13)
2005	Oakville Blue Devils	7	(1)
- * Club domestic league appearances and goals

Ryan Gamble (born 22 November 1972) is a South African former soccer player who played as a forward.

== Playing career ==
Gamble began his career within the Canadian National Soccer League in 1994 with Toronto Italia, where he led the league in scoring and was named the Rookie of the Year. In 1996, he helped Italia claim the double (regular season title, and CNSL Championship). He featured in the CNSL Championship final against St. Catharines Wolves, and contributed a goal. In 1997, he signed with San Francisco Bay Seals of the USISL D-3 Pro League, where he helped San Francisco win the Western Division. At the conclusion of the USISL season, he signed with the Toronto Lynx of the USL A-League.

In 2001, Gamble signed with Toronto Supra of the Canadian Professional Soccer League. During the season he was selected for the CPSL All-Star roster which faced C.S. Marítimo. In 2005, he signed with expansion franchise Oakville Blue Devils, where he helped Oakville finish second in the Western Conference with the best offensive record in the division. Gamble featured in the CPSL Championship match against Vaughan Shooters, where he came off the bench to score the winning goal to claim the club's first championship. After the championship match, Gamble announced his retirement from competitive soccer.

== Administrative career ==
In 2019, he was a staff member for the Mississauga MetroStars in the Major Arena Soccer League and was involved in strategy and platform development. He announced the team's partnership with Marvel Comics, which would host the Marvel Super Hero Weekend sporting experience.

== Honours ==
=== Toronto Italia ===
- Canadian National Soccer League Regular Season Champions: 1996
- CNSL Championship: 1996

=== Oakville Blue Devils ===
- CPSL Championship: 2005
