= Paul Moore (soccer) =

Canadian soccer player

Personal information
- Full name: Paul Moore
- Place of birth: Canada
- Position: Forward

Senior career*
Years	Team	Apps	(Gls)
1995–1996	St. Catharines Wolves		
1997	Toronto Lynx	2	(0)
1997	Toronto Supra		
1998	Toronto Olympians		
1998–1999	Glen Shields		
1999–2000	Edmonton Drillers (indoor)	4	(1)
2000	Toronto Croatia	18	(9)
2001–2003	Toronto/Mississauga Olympians		
- * Club domestic league appearances and goals as of 8 February 2015

Paul Moore is a Canadian former soccer player who played most notably in the USL A-League, National Professional Soccer League, and with various Canadian soccer leagues.

== Club career ==
=== Early career ===
Moore began his professional career in the Canadian National Soccer League with St. Catharines Wolves in 1995 and had a two-year tenure with the club. During his tenure with St. Catharines, he achieved the CNSL Championship and two league cups.

=== Toronto Lynx ===
In April 1997, he signed with the expansion franchise, the Toronto Lynx in the USL A-League, his signing was announced in a press conference which revealed the team roster. Moore made his debut for the club on April 12, 1997, in the Lynx's first official match against Jacksonville Cyclones; the game would eventually result in a 3-1 defeat for the fledgling side. In total, he would appear in 2 matches for Toronto.

For the remainder of the year, he returned to the CNSL with Toronto Supra and featured in the CNSL Championship final against former club St. Catharines Wolves.

=== CPSL ===
In 1998, Moore signed with the Toronto Olympians of the newly formed Canadian Professional Soccer League. Midway through the season, he was transferred to Glen Shields. In 2000, he signed with Toronto Croatia where he finished second in scoring for the club. He also assisted in securing the CPSL Championship after Croatia defeated the Toronto Olympians by a score of 2-1. The following season he returned to the Olympians.

=== Indoor career ===
He played at the indoor level with the Edmonton Drillers in the America-based National Professional Soccer League during the 1999-00 indoor season. He would appear in 4 matches and record a goal.

=== Ontario Cup ===
In 2009, he played with Markham Soccer Club in the Ontario Cup tournament.

== Honors ==
St. Catharines Wolves

- CNSL Championship: 1995
- CNSL League Cup: 1995, 1996

Toronto Croatia

- CPSL Championship: 2000
