= Raúl Maradona =

Argentine footballer

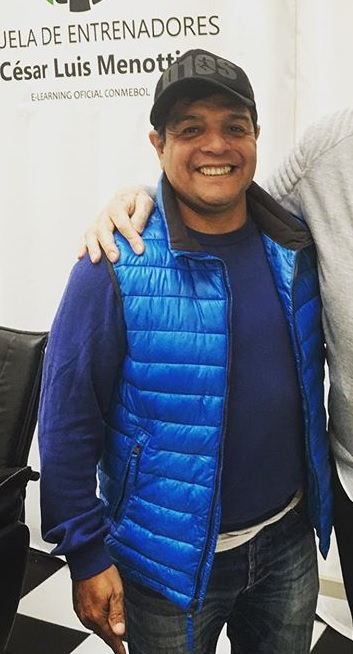

Personal information
- Full name: Raúl Alfredo Maradona
- Date of birth: 29 November 1966 (age 59)
- Place of birth: Lanús, Argentina
- Position: Striker

Youth career
- Boca Juniors

Senior career*
Years	Team	Apps	(Gls)
1986	Boca Juniors	3	(0)
1987–1988	Granada	19	(2)
1989–?	Avispa Fukuoka	?	(?)
1993	Fort Lauderdale Strikers	8	(2)
1995–1996	Toronto Italia	?	(?)
1996–1997	Toronto Shooting Stars (indoor)	27	(12)
1997	North York Talons		
1997–1998	Buffalo Blizzard (indoor)	5	(1)
1998	Deportivo Municipal	1	(0)
1998	Toronto Olympians		
1999	Deportivo Laferrere	?	(?)
1999	Deportivo Italia	?	(?)
- * Club domestic league appearances and goals

Raúl Alfredo Maradona, also known as Lalo Maradona (born 29 November 1966) is an Argentine former professional footballer who played as a striker.

== Career ==
Maradona played in Argentina for Boca Juniors, in Spain for Granada, and in Peru for Deportivo Municipal; he also played in Japan and Canada and Venezuela. In 1993, he went to North America to sign with Fort Lauderdale Strikers of the American Professional Soccer League. In 1995, he signed with Toronto Italia of the Canadian National Soccer League. The following season his team won the regular season championship, and reached the CNSL Championship final where the club faced St. Catharines Wolves, and won the series 11–0 on aggregate. After the conclusion of the CNSL season he signed with the Toronto Shooting Stars of the National Professional Soccer League, where he appeared in 27 matches and recorded 12 goals. Following the conclusion of the indoor season Maradona returned to the CNSL and signed with North York Talons.

In 1998 he joined Peruvian side for Deportivo Municipal, where he was greeted as a star but only played a few games. He subsequently played in the Canadian Professional Soccer League with Toronto Olympians.

== Personal life ==
Maradona is the brother of fellow players Diego (1960–2020) and Hugo (1969–2021). Their father Diego Maradona (known as "Chitoro"; 1927–2015), who worked at a chemicals factory, was of Guaraní (Indigenous) and Galician (Spanish) descent, and their mother Dalma Salvadora Franco (known as "Doña Tota"; 1929–2011), was of Italian descent.

== Sources ==
- El hermano malo, double edition: Lalo y Hugo Maradona
- La historia de "Lalo" Maradona
