= Brian Timmis Stadium =

Soccer stadium in Hamilton, Ontario

- Interactive map of Brian Timmis Stadium
- Former names: Civic Stadium
- Location: 75 Cannon Street North, Hamilton, Ontario
- Coordinates: 43°15′5″N 79°49′49″W
- Capacity: 5,000
- Surface: Grass

Construction
- Renovated: 1968
- Closed: 2012
- Demolished: 2013

Tenants
- Hamilton Croatia (CSL) (2010); Hamilton Thunder (CPSL) (2001–2005)

Brian Timmis Stadium was a soccer stadium in Hamilton, Ontario. The stadium was built in 1968, and seated 5,000 people. The stadium most recently hosted soccer teams Hamilton Croatia, a Canadian Professional Soccer League club, and the Hamilton Avalanche, a club that played in the W-League of the United Soccer Leagues. It was located next to Ivor Wynne Stadium.

Named after CFL player Brian Timmis, the stadium also previously hosted soccer teams the Hamilton Steelers and the Hamilton Thunder before the franchises folded.

Prior to 1968 the site was home to Scott Park baseball field built in 1925. The grandstand was demolished and converted into a soccer pitch.

In 2013, the stadium was demolished along with Ivor Wynne Stadium to make room for Hamilton Stadium which opened in 2014. The public square of the new stadium is located on the site of Brian Timmis Stadium.
