= Gord Arrowsmith =

Canadian soccer referee (born 1944)

Gord Arrowmsith
- Full name: Gordon Charles Arrowsmith
- Born: June 13, 1944 (age 82); London, England
- Other occupation: Metropolitan Toronto Police Force

Domestic
Years	League	Role
1970–1976	NSL	Referee
1980–1984	NASL	Referee
1987–1992	CSL	Referee
1998–2004	CPSL	Referee

International
Years	League	Role
1982–1991	FIFA listed	Referee

Gordon Arrowsmith (born June 13, 1944) is an English-born Canadian former soccer referee.

== Career ==
He was born in London, England, and began refereeing in 1965 in Paisley, Scotland. In 1970, he emigrated to Toronto, Canada, where he continued match officiating and was also employed by the Metropolitan Toronto Police Force. He served on the FIFA International Referees List for 10 years from 1982 till 1991. He officiated in the National Soccer League in the 1970s. In 1980, he began refereeing in the North American Soccer League.

He was selected for the 1987 FIFA U-16 World Championship, and officiated the 1988, and 1991 Canadian Soccer League finals. He later officiated the 1998 CPSL Championship final, and the first match series of the CPSL League Cup final. In 1992, the Canadian Soccer Association selected Arrowsmith as the recipient for the Ray Morgan Memorial Award, and the Canada Soccer International Achievement Award in 1997. In 2012, he was inducted into the Canada Soccer Hall of Fame in the Builder category.

== Honours ==
- Ray Morgan Memorial Award: 1992
