= Monarch Park Stadium =

Stadium in Toronto, Ontario, Canada

Coordinates: 43°40′46″N 79°19′22″W

- Location in Toronto Location in Ontario Location in Canada
- Address: 1 Parkmount Road
- Location: Toronto, Ontario, Canada
- Owner: Toronto District School Board
- Operator: Monarch Park Collegiate / TDSB
- Capacity: 5,000
- Surface: FieldTurf
- Field size: 60m x 120 m (Approx)

Construction
- Built: 1964
- Opened: 1964

Tenants
- Monarch Park Lions; Ryerson Rams Soccer (until 2015); Toronto Rush (AUDL) (2018); Sanjaxx Lions (L1O) (2015–2018)

Monarch Park Stadium is a multi-purpose stadium in Toronto, Ontario, Canada. It is located near the intersection of Hanson Street and Coxwell Avenue next to Monarch Park Collegiate. Monarch Park Stadium is used mostly for amateur soccer, baseball, and athletics principally by the Toronto District School Board. Built in 1964, the stadium replaced baseball fields that existed before the school was built in the 1940s.

Its capacity is 5,000 with a grandstand located on the south side of the field. A track circles around the field. In early 2012, the TDSB entered into a long-term partnership agreement with Razor Management Inc. (RMI) to redevelop Monarch Park Stadium. RMI will be spending $5 million to upgrade the facilities, which will see an inflatable dome cover at the site for use each year from October to April. and surface replaced.

The Ryerson Rams soccer team played its home games at the facility, but lost their permit to use the facility in 2015. The stadium was also used as the location for Broken Social Scene's "I'm Still Your Fag" music video.

In May 2018, Toronto FC's United Soccer League side, Toronto FC II, played one game at Monarch Park. The weekday morning game on May 9 drew the largest attendance in Toronto FC II's history (4,100). Monarch Park was one of three temporary homes for TFC II (along with BMO Field and Rochester's Marina Auto Stadium) during the first half of the 2018 season while the team awaited renovations on their new home at Lamport Stadium. A second game had been tentatively scheduled for Monarch Park - it was later moved twice, first to BMO Field and later to their opponents' home venue (Charlotte's Sportsplex at Matthews).

== See also ==
- Centennial Park Stadium
- Varsity Stadium
- Lamport Stadium
- Birchmount Stadium
- Metro Toronto Track and Field Centre
- Rosedale Field
- York Lions Stadium
