= Paulo Silva (footballer) =

Brazilian footballer and manager

Personal information
- Full name: Paulo Silva
- Date of birth: May 24, 1966 (age 60)
- Place of birth: Ipatinga, Brazil
- Position: Goalkeeper

Senior career*
Years	Team	Apps	(Gls)
1984–1986	Cruzeiro		
1987–1989	Democrata Futebol Clube		
1990–1995	Scarborough Astros		
1996	Toronto Supra	10	(0)
2001	Brampton Hitmen	12	(0)
2003	North York Astros	1	(0)

Managerial career
- 1999–2003: Toronto Lynx (goalkeeper coach/assistant coach)
- 2005: Toronto Lynx (goalkeeper coach)
- * Club domestic league appearances and goals

Paulo Silva (born May 24, 1966) is a former Brazilian footballer and manager who played in Brazil, Canada, and served on the coaching staff with the Toronto Lynx in the USL A-League.

== Club career ==
Silva played in the Campeonato Mineiro with Cruzeiro in 1984, and later signed with Democrata Futebol Clube in 1987. He was awarded the Best Player Award in 1987, and was selected State All-Star Goalkeeper. In 1990, Silva went overseas to Canada to sign with the Scarborough Astros of the Canadian National Soccer League. During his tenure with the Astros he was awarded the CNSL Goalkeeper of the Year within three years from 1990, 1991, and 1993. In 1995, he helped Scarborough finish first in the League Cup standings and reached the cup finals but lost the title to St. Catharines Wolves in a penalty shootout. He was also selected to the CNSL All-Star team that faced Parma in 1995.

He signed with league rivals Toronto Supra for the 1996 season. For the second consecutive season, he was named to the CNSL All-Star team, and played against Toronto Italia, which included Diego Maradona. In 2001, he came out of retirement to play to newly expansion franchise the Brampton Hitmen of the Canadian Professional Soccer League. Silva would also make an appearance in 2003 with the North York Astros on September 10, 2003, in a match against Toronto Croatia. He re-signed with North York for the 2004 season.

== Managerial career ==
In 1998, he was named the goalkeeper coach for Toronto Lynx under head coach Peter Pinizzotto. He also served as an assistant coach, and team scout in the 1999 season. In 2005, he returned to the Toronto Lynx as a goalkeeper coach under Hubert Busby Jr. He was also the technical director for the Toronto Eagles Soccer Academy in 2005. In 2021, he joined the Genesis Football Academy staff as the goalkeeper coach.
