= Franco Spadafina =

Canadian soccer player

Personal information
- Full name: Franco Spadafina
- Date of birth: April 24, 1972 (age 54)
- Position: Defender

Senior career*
Years	Team	Apps	(Gls)
1994–1996	Toronto Italia	34	(0)
1997–1998	Toronto Lynx	46	(4)
- * Club domestic league appearances and goals

Franco Spadafina is a Canadian former soccer player who played the majority of his career within the Canadian soccer system.

== Playing career ==
Spadafina began his career with the Toronto Italia of the Canadian National Soccer League in 1994. In his first season with Italia he won a Double (association football) with the club. The club reached the finals of the Umbro Cup, but were defeated by St. Catharines Wolves. He re-signed with Italia for the 1995 season; his signing was announced with the unveiling of the Italia roster for the 1995 season. The club failed to reach the postseason by finishing third in the standings, and finished fourth in the standings of the Umbro Cup tournament. The following season, he added a Treble (association football) to his resume by winning the Umbro Cup along with Playoff Championship.

In 1997, Spadafina signed with expansion franchise the Toronto Lynx of the USL A-League, where he was reunited with his old Toronto Italia head coach Peter Pinizzotto. His signing was in April 1997 in a press conference which revealed the club's roster for the 1997 season. He made his debut for the club on April 12, 1997 in a match against the Jacksonville Cyclones which resulted in 3-1 defeat. Spadafina assisted the club in qualifying for the post season for the first time in the franchise's history, by finishing 4th in the Northeastern division. The Lynx were eliminated in the first round of the playoffs against the Montreal Impact. In the first round playoff match he was ejected from the game, which was a 2-1 victory for Montreal. He returned to the Lynx the following year where he appeared in 21 matches and scored 3 goals, but failed to make the post season by finishing second last in their division.
