= Birchmount Stadium =

Sports facility in Toronto, Ontario

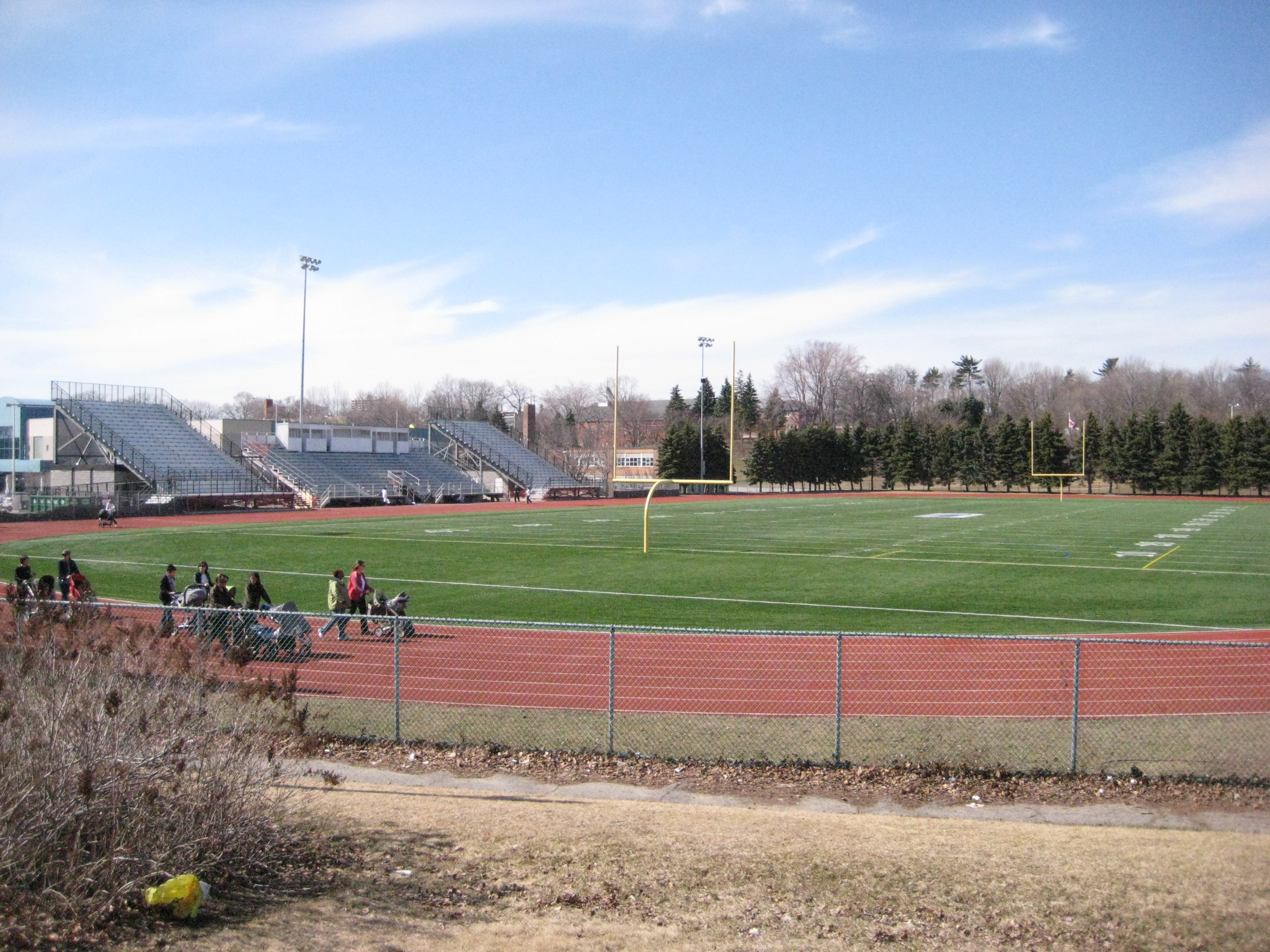
- Birchmount Stadium in 2010

- Location in Toronto Location in Ontario Location in Canada
- Address: 85 Birchmount Road; Toronto, Ontario; M1N 3J7
- Coordinates: 43°41′44″N 79°15′39″W
- Owner: City of Toronto government Toronto District School Board
- Operator: TDSB
- Capacity: 2,000
- Surface: Artificial Turf
- Scoreboard: Yes W/Video Monitor

Construction
- Built: 1960s
- Opened: 1960s
- Renovated: 2006
- Expanded: 2006

Tenants
- Canada Rugby League; Toronto Maddogs (NFC); City of Toronto Private Rentals; University of Toronto 2002-2006; Bichmount CI; Scarborough SC 2014-present Toronto Skillz FC 2016-present

Birchmount Stadium is a multi-purpose outdoor sports facility in Toronto, Ontario, Canada. Situated in Birchmount Park, it is located near Kingston Road and Birchmount Road in the former city of Scarborough. Its original capacity was 6,345, and it was built for what was then the Borough of Scarborough.

The stadium plays host to many amateur sporting events including football, soccer, rugby league and athletics.

It most recently played host to the opening round of Canada Rugby League's Ontario conference.

It played host to the University of Toronto's Varsity Blues Football team in 2002 and 2006 while their Varsity Stadium was being demolished and rebuilt. It also previously played host to the Metro Lions.

It also serves as the primary stadium for the annual Robbie International Soccer Tournament, which bills itself as "the world's largest annual charitable youth soccer tournament." The Canadian band Barenaked Ladies notably name-dropped the stadium and the tournament at the end of their 1998 #1 hit, "One Week", singing "Birchmount Stadium, home of the Robbie" as the song's closing line.

The east grandstand of the stadium was demolished in the spring of 2006, reducing seating capacity to about 2,000. The original grass field and running track were removed. A new track and artificial turf for football/soccer were installed during the summer of 2006. The newly renovated Birchmount Stadium opened up for the first time as a premier facility on September 15, 2006. They hosted the University of Toronto Varsity Blues vs Waterloo. Birchmount Park Collegiate Institute also uses the stadium for its home football, rugby, soccer and field hockey games in the Toronto District Secondary School Athletic Association.

On September 2, 1996, Diego Maradona played for Toronto Italia in one of his last professional appearances.

Since 2014, the Soccer club Scarborough SC of the Canadian Soccer League has played their home games at Birchmount Stadium.

As of 2016, Birchmount Stadium is the home ground of League1 Ontario team, Toronto Skillz FC.

== Gallery ==
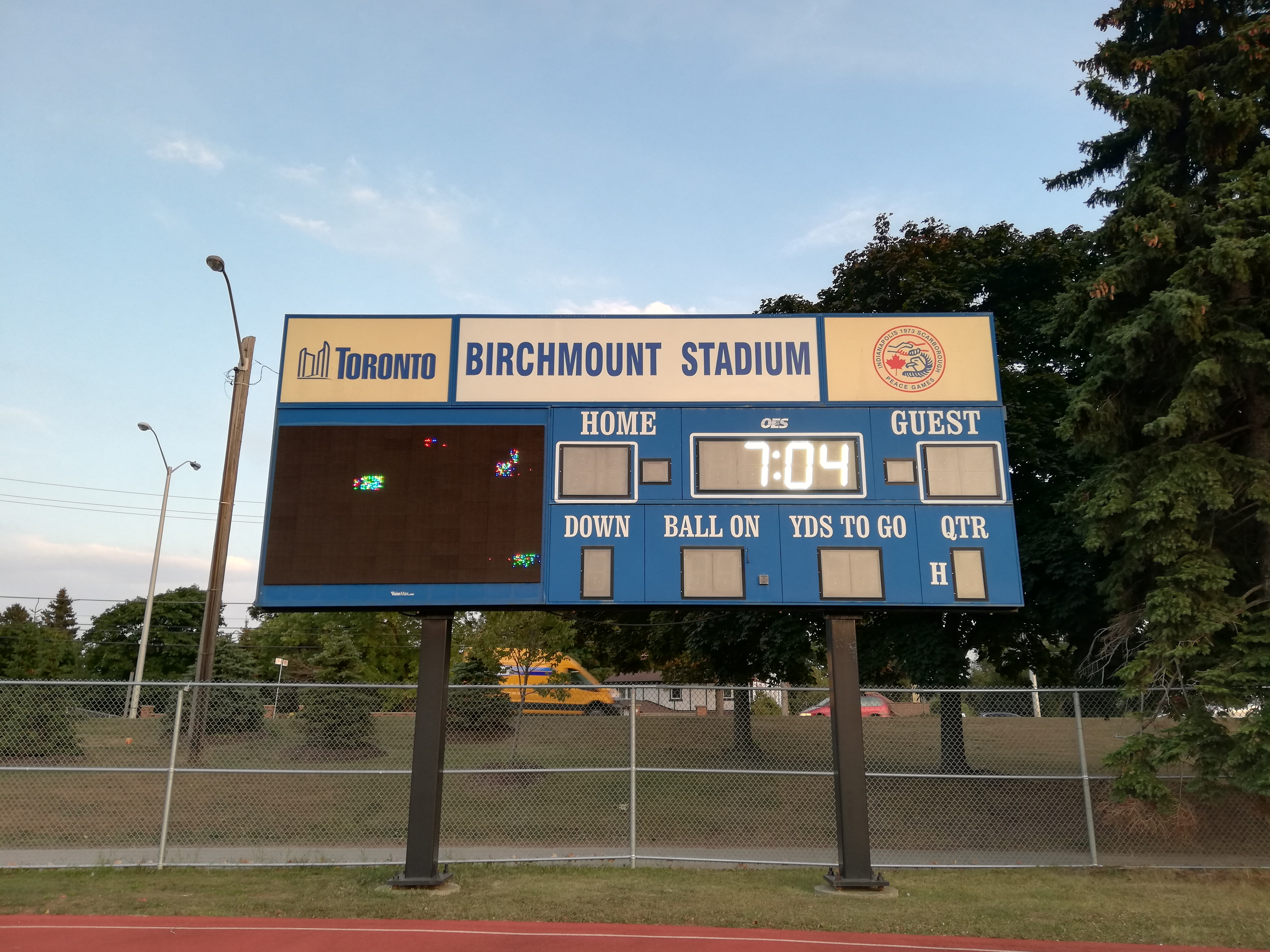
The electronic scoreboard at the Kingston Road side

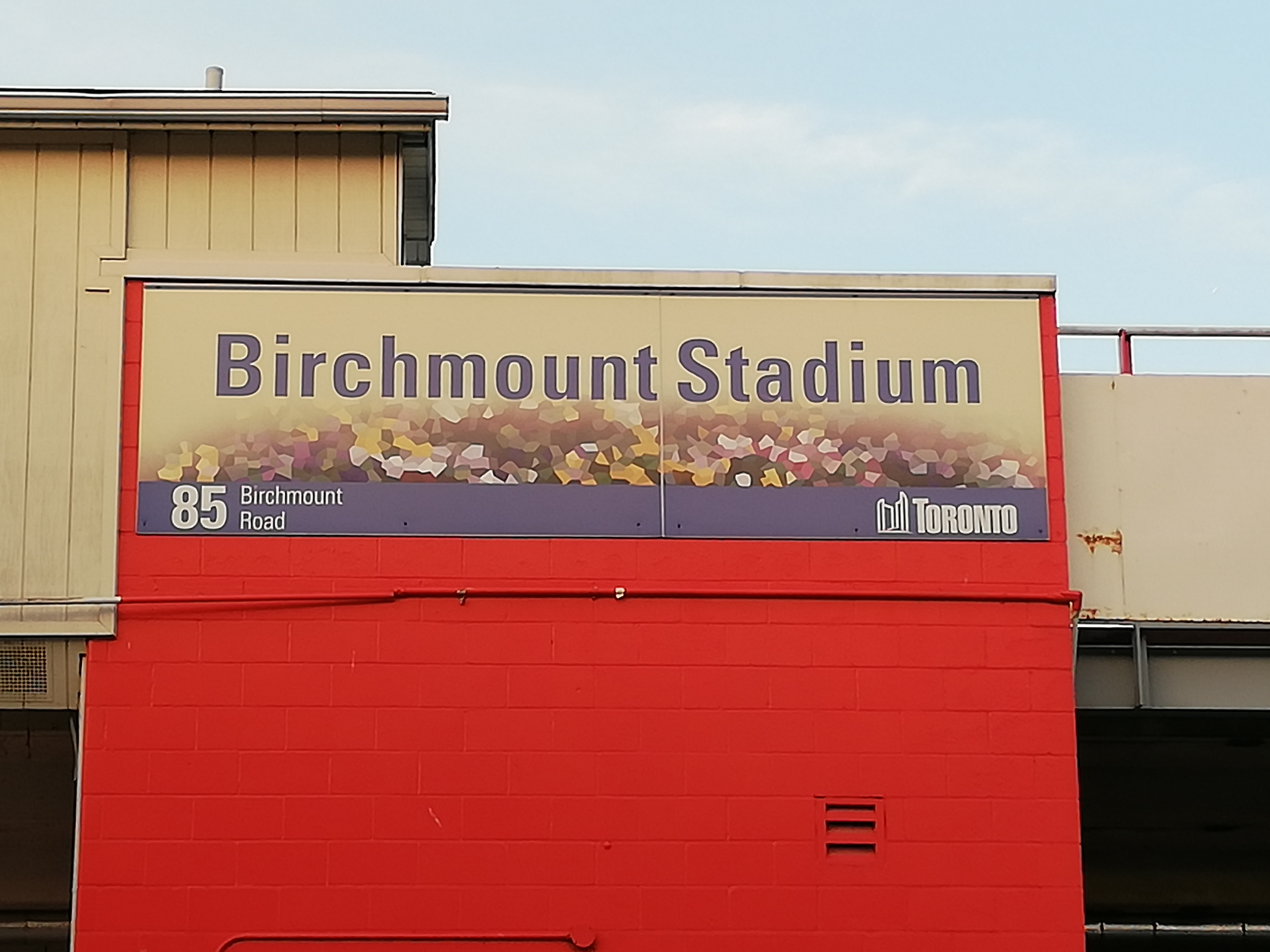
The stadium headboard
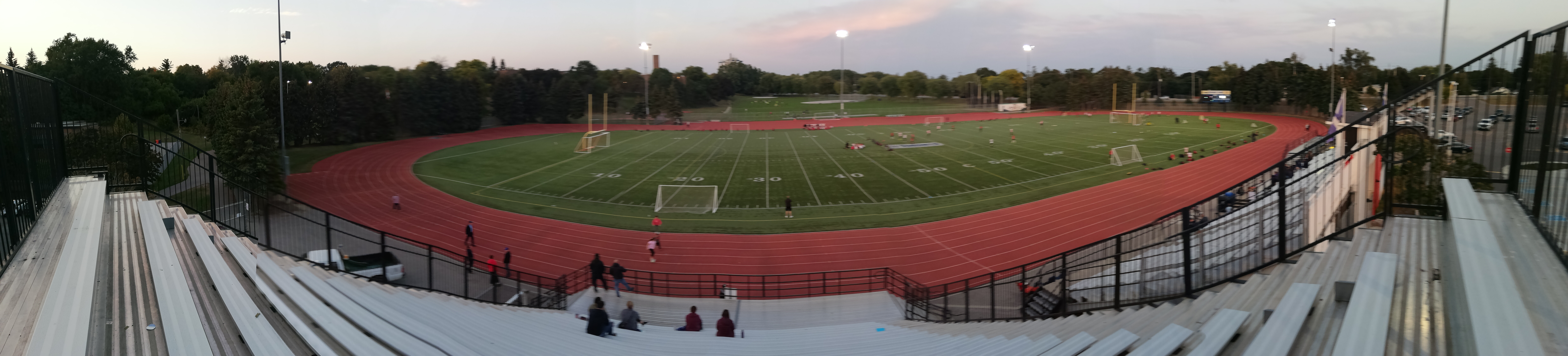
A panoramic view of the field from the west stand

== See also ==
- Rob Ford Stadium - City of Toronto
- Varsity Stadium - University of Toronto
- Lamport Stadium - City of Toronto
- Monarch Park Stadium - Toronto District School Board
- Metro Toronto Track and Field Centre - City of Toronto
- Rosedale Field - City of Toronto
- York Lions Stadium - York University
