= Jorge Armúa =

Uruguayan footballer and coach

Personal information
- Place of birth: Montevideo, Uruguay

Senior career*
Years	Team	Apps	(Gls)
1974–1979	Huracán Buceo		
1987	Nacional Latino		

Managerial career
- 1986–1992: Toronto Blizzard (assistant coach)
- 1993–1998: Scarborough/North York Astros
- 2004–2005: Hamilton Thunder
- 2007: Portuguese Supra
- * Club domestic league appearances and goals

Jorge Armúa is a Uruguayan former footballer and head coach of several Ontario soccer clubs. He is currently the head coach of Clarkson soccer club.

== Playing career ==
Armúa began his professional career in his native Uruguay in the Uruguayan Primera División with Huracán Buceo. His greatest achievement with the club was being awarded the golden ball trophy in 1976 which recognized the best player of the season. In 1987, he played in the National Soccer League with Nacional Latino.

== Managerial career ==
=== Canada ===
Armúa's first managerial job was with the Toronto Blizzard of the original Canadian Soccer League where he served as an assistant coach. His first head coach position was with the Scarborough Astros of the Canadian National Soccer League in 1993. His greatest achievement with Scarborough was reaching the Ontario cup finals, which ended in a 3–0 defeat in penalty shootout to the St. Catharines Wolves. In 1995, he was selected along with Mark Konert as the head coaches for the CNSL All-Star team against Parma. In 1998, The Astros relocated to North York and joined the newly formed Canadian Professional Soccer League. In their first season in the CPSL the club finished fourth overall in the standings and reached the semi-finals, but were defeated by the Toronto Olympians. He coached the Woodbridge Strikers and won the Ontario Soccer League.

Armúa returned to the CPSL in 2004 to coach the Hamilton Thunder. He repeated Hamilton's previous success by once again claiming the Western Conference title and securing a playoff berth. In the postseason the Thunder faced Toronto Croatia in the semi-finals but were defeated by a score of 2–0. Armúa resumed his duties as head coach for Hamilton for the 2005 season. Where he once again added more silverware to Hamilton's cabinet by successfully defending their Western Conference title for the third year in a row. He was also selected as the head coach for the league's all-star team that faced Scottish side Rangers. In the playoffs, Hamilton received a bye to the semi-finals, where the club would face the Oakville Blue Devils. However, Hamilton was deprived of five core players from the starting lineup because the players were affiliated with the Woodbridge Azzuri which consequently discontinued their association with Hamilton resulting in a shortage of players for the club which led to their defeat to Oakville.

In 2007, he was appointed head coach of Portuguese Supra midway through the season. He achieved the club's first victory since 15 July 2007 on a 2–1 win over North York Astros. Unfortunately, Armúa's attempt to revive Supra meet in vain as the club finished last in the International Division, and second last in the overall standings missing out on the postseason.

=== Youth level ===
In 2008, Armúa became involved with Mississauga-based Clarkson Comets where he coached various youth groups in the club's program.

== Honors ==
Hamilton Thunder

- Canadian Professional Soccer League Western Conference: 2004, 2005
