= Rob Ford Stadium =

Stadium in Toronto, Canada

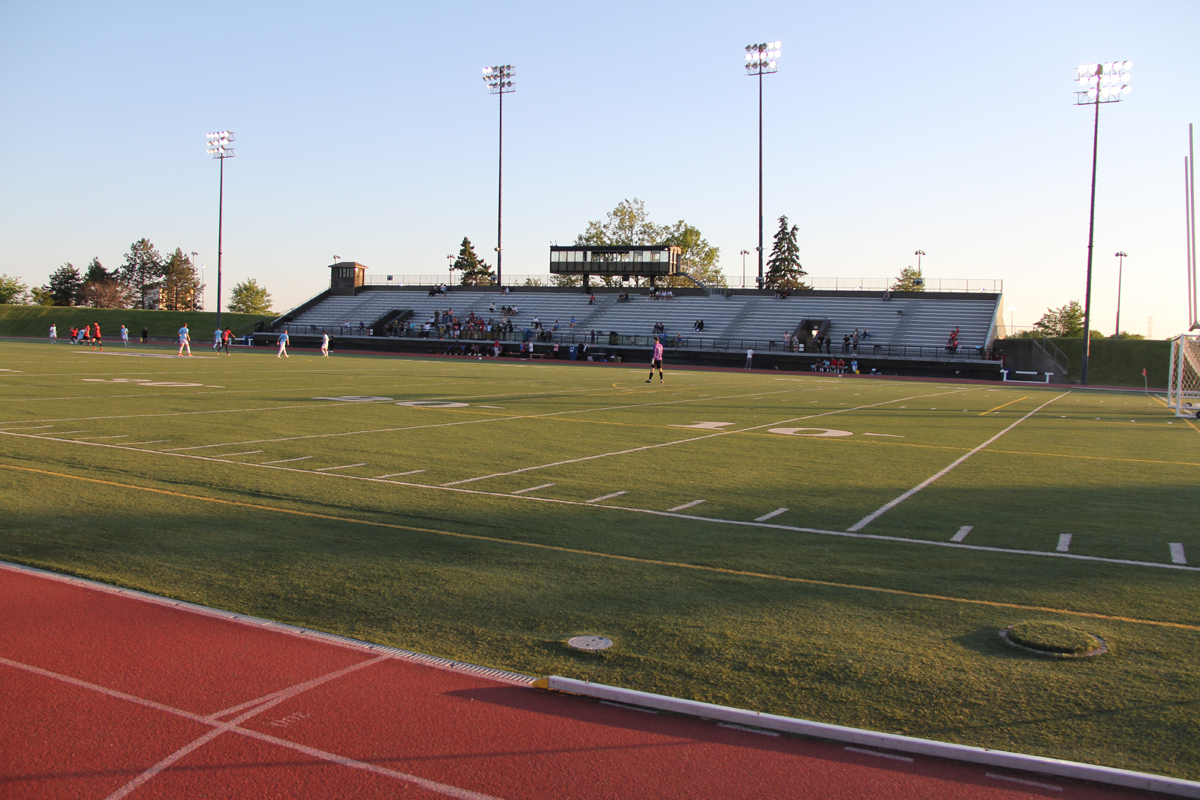
- The stadium pictured in 2024

- Location in Toronto Location in Ontario Location in Canada
- Former names: Centennial Park Stadium (1975–2024)
- Location: Toronto, Ontario, Canada
- Coordinates: 43°39′13″N 79°35′04″W
- Owner: City of Toronto
- Operator: Toronto Parks, Forestry & Recreation
- Capacity: 2,200
- Surface: Artificial turf
- Scoreboard: Yes

Construction
- Built: 1975
- Opened: 1975
- Renovated: 2009

Tenants
- Current Serbian White Eagles (2006–present); FC Ukraine United (2006–present); Etobicoke Eagles (2009–present); GTA Grizzlies (2015–present) Past Toronto Rockets (1994–1995); Toronto Lady Lynx (1997–2015); Toronto Supra Portuguese (2001–2007); Toronto Lynx (2002–2017); Toronto Atomic FC (2015–2017)

Rob Ford Stadium (formerly Centennial Park Stadium) is a 2,200-seat stadium in Toronto, Ontario, Canada. It is primarily used for soccer, track and field and football.

It is located within Centennial Park in Etobicoke, just south of Toronto Pearson International Airport and near the intersection of Rathburn Road and Renforth Drive. It was built in 1975.

The stadium has seating in a grandstand on the west side and a small scoreboard on the north end of the field. The stadium was renovated in 2009 with the installation of new seating and artificial turf.

== Usage ==
- The stadium hosted the first edition of Veteran Athletes Championships in 1975.
- The stadium hosted the closing ceremony of the 1976 Summer Paralympics and some of the sporting events.
- The stadium hosted the CPSL/CSL Championship finals in 1998, 2010, 2011, and 2014.
- The stadium hosts the Relay For Life in Toronto West event each June, a fundraiser for the Canadian Cancer Society.
- The stadium is also used for the ROPSSAA football finals and the PSAA (Private Schools Athletic Association) on the first Monday of May for an annual Track and Field Meet.

== Name ==
The stadium was originally named for Centennial Park, which it is located in and opened during Canada's centennial year of 1967; the stadium was opened in 1975, eight years after the centennial.

In 2017, there were calls and support for the stadium to be renamed after former mayor Rob Ford as Rob Ford Memorial Stadium, but city council voted down the motion 11 to 24 on October 4, 2017. In 2023, amid the re-imagining of the park through the Centennial Park Master Plan that was also approved in 2021, city council again considered a motion to rename the stadium after Ford, this time passing 17 to 6.

The stadium was officially renamed Rob Ford Stadium on May 28, 2024. The first game played on the re-named stadium was a Canadian Soccer League encounter between Serbian White Eagles FC and Spanish Future Stars on May 31, 2024.

== See also ==
- Birchmount Stadium – City of Toronto / Toronto District School Board
- Varsity Stadium – University of Toronto
- Esther Shiner Stadium – City of Toronto
- Lamport Stadium – City of Toronto
- Monarch Park Stadium – Toronto District School Board
- Toronto Track and Field Centre – City of Toronto
- Rosedale Field – City of Toronto
- York Lions Stadium – York University
