= Esther Shiner Stadium =

Sports venue in Toronto, Canada

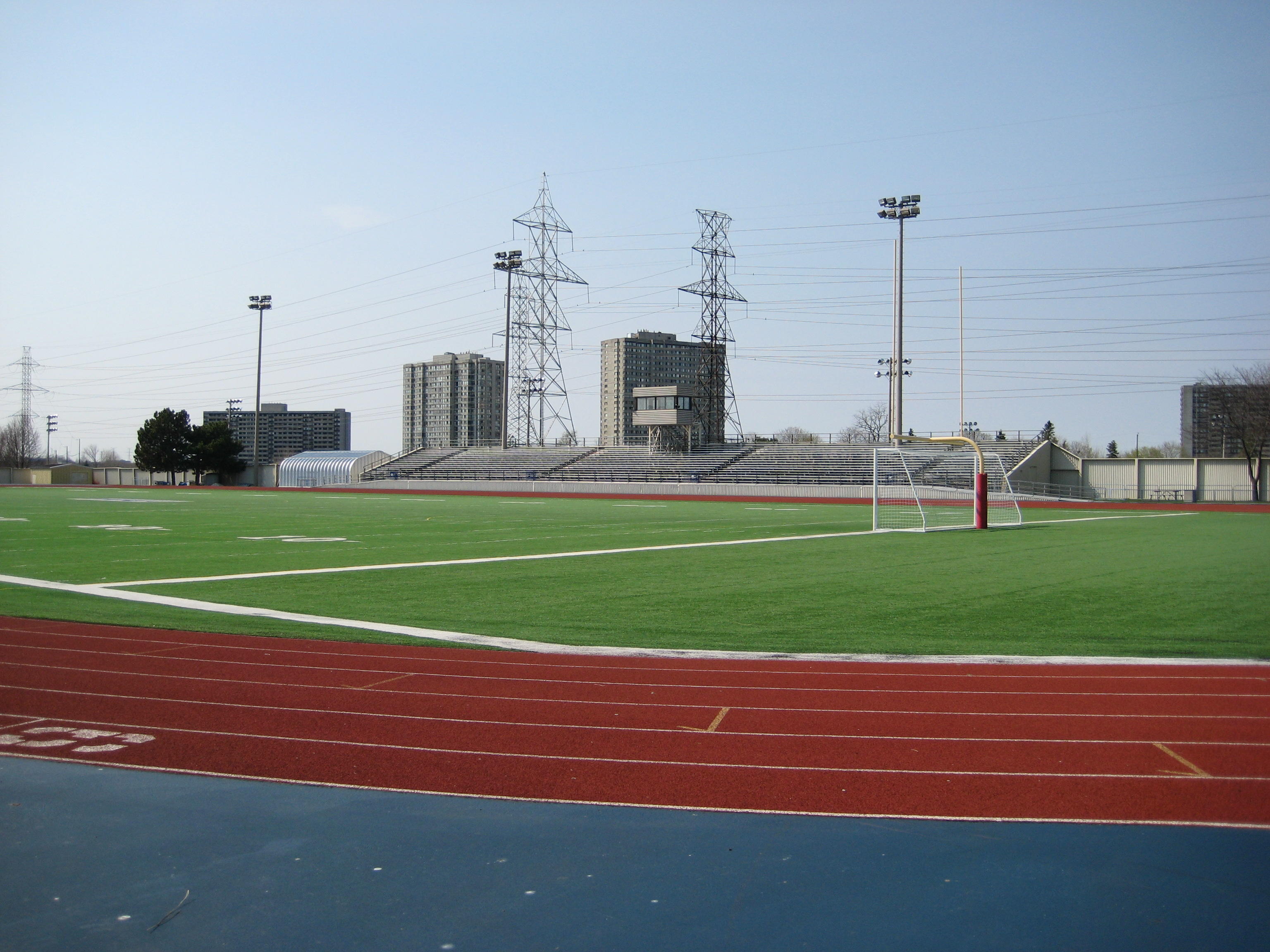
- Esther Shiner Stadium pictured in 2010

- Location in Toronto Location in Ontario Location in Canada
- Full name: Esther Shiner Stadium
- Address: 5720 Bathurst Street
- Location: Toronto, Ontario, Canada
- Coordinates: 43°46′32″N 79°26′48″W
- Owner: City of Toronto government
- Capacity: 3,000
- Surface: Artificial Turf

Construction
- Built: 1984
- Opened: 1984
- Renovated: 2005

Tenants
- North York Astros (CSL) (1996-2003, 2005-2014); Sanjaxx Lions (L1O) (2015); FC Vorkuta (CSL) (2017-present)

Esther Shiner Stadium is a multi-purpose outdoor sports facility in Toronto, Ontario, Canada. It is located in the former city of North York, on the north-west corner of Bathurst Street and Finch Avenue West. Its capacity is 3,000 and is currently the home of North Toronto Nitros of League1 Ontario and FC Vorkuta of the Canadian Soccer League.

York University's football team were former tenants of the stadium from the 1980s to 1995 until a football field was built on campus (see York Stadium).

The stadium plays host to many sporting events including Canadian football, soccer, and athletics. The stadium has hosted the majority of CPSL/CSL Championship finals from 2002, 2005, 2006, 2007, 2008, and 2014.

The stadium was built in June 1984, and was originally named North York Civic Stadium. It was renamed in 1988 in honour of former City of North York Councillor Esther Shiner. In 2004, the stadium was closed for refurbishment, and it reopened on September 15, 2005 with a new artificial playing surface and a running track.

== See also ==
- Rob Ford Stadium - City of Toronto
- Varsity Stadium - University of Toronto
- Lamport Stadium - City of Toronto
- Monarch Park Stadium - Toronto District School Board
- Metro Toronto Track and Field Centre - City of Toronto
- Rosedale Field - City of Toronto
- York Lions Stadium - York University
