= Peter Pinizzotto =

Italian born Canadian soccer coach

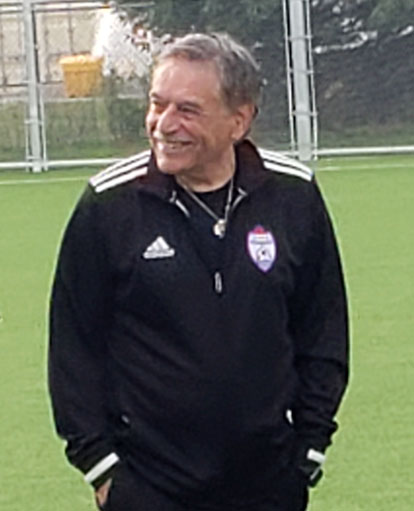
- Pinizzotto in 2024

Personal information
- Place of birth: Italy

Youth career
- US Biel-Bienne

Senior career*
Years	Team	Apps	(Gls)
- US Biel-Bienne
- Hamilton Canadians
- FC Delia
- Pineto
- FC Pratola
- Toronto Italia

Managerial career
- 1991–1992: Woodbridge Azzurri
- 1993: Richmond Hill Kick of York
- 1994: Toronto Italia
- 1995: Italo Canadians
- 1996: Toronto Italia
- 1997–2003: Toronto Lynx
- 2004–2008: Montreal Impact (assistant)
- 2009–: Woodbridge Strikers
- * Club domestic league appearances and goals

Peter Pinizzotto is an Italian born Canadian soccer coach who serves as the head coach for Woodbridge Strikers in League1 Ontario.

Pinizzotto is known for managing the Toronto Lynx, and is the longest-serving manager in the history of Toronto Lynx, having managed from 1997 and 2003. After his tenure with the Lynx, Pinnizzotto was appointed assistant coach to the Montreal Impact under Nick De Santis. He enjoyed success with the Impact winning the 2004 USL First Division league championship, as well as winning the Voyageurs Cup four years in a row. In 2009, he became associated with the Woodbridge Strikers.

== Playing career ==
Pinizzotto was born in Italy, but shortly after moved to Switzerland where he joined the academy of FC Biel-Bienne eventually being called up to the first team. In 1968, he immigrated to Canada where he spent time in the National Soccer League with Hamilton Italo–Canadians, and Toronto Italia. He also played in Italy with FC. Delia, ASD Pineto Calcio, and FC. Patola.

== Managerial career ==
=== Early years ===
In 1991, Pinizzotto began managing in the Second Division of the Toronto and District League with Woodbridge Azzuri. The following season he returned to the renamed Canadian National Soccer League with Richmond Hill Kick of York in 1993. Toronto Italia hired him as head coach for the 1994 season where he secured Toronto the double. As a result of his success he was named the CNSL Coach of the Year. In 1995, he managed Italo Canadians in the Canadian International Soccer League (Puma League), but eventually returned to Toronto Italia in 1996. In his second season with Italia he repeated his previous success, and was named Coach of the Year for the second time. He also managed in the 1996 CNSL All-Star match for Toronto Italia, which featured Diego Maradona against the CNSL All-Stars.

=== Toronto Lynx ===
When the USL A-League granted the Toronto Lynx a franchise Pinizzotto was appointed the inaugural head coach for the 1997 season. He assembled a roster with several noted CNSL veterans along with future Canadian internationals. In his debut season he led Toronto to a USL record of ten consecutive wins for an expansion franchise. As a result the club clinched a postseason berth by finishing fourth in the Northeast division, and were eliminated in the first round of the playoffs to Montreal Impact. In 1999, he was named general manager while maintaining his coaching responsibilities.

Pinizzotto secured another playoff berth for Toronto in the 2000 season after finishing third in the Northeast division. In the preliminary rounds of the postseason Toronto defeated Long Island Rough Riders, and Richmond Kickers. In the Eastern Conference final the Lynx were eliminated by the Rochester Rhinos. Pinizzotto's final notable season occurred in 2002 where Toronto nearly clinched the final berth playoff berth. Where the Lynx had to register a victory in the final match against Atlanta Silverbacks FC, but tied the match which allowed the Charlotte Eagles to secure the final berth in the Eastern Conference.

Meanwhile in the inaugural 2002 Voyageurs Cup the club finished as runner's up to Montreal. After the 2003 season the ownership of Toronto modified their club policy by deciding not to renew Pinizzotto's contract, and hired Duncan Wilde as his successor. Throughout his tenure in Toronto he was known for providing young talent an opportunity to develop their skills, and as result produced several notable players to the Canada national team program. He also served as an assistant coach under Gary Hindley for the Toronto ThunderHawks in the National Professional Soccer League for the 2000-2001 indoor season.

=== Montreal Impact ===
In 2004, Pinizzotto accepted the position of assistant coach for the Montreal Impact under Nick DeSantis. In his first season he helped the team win the league double, and the Voyageurs Cup. The following season he helped the team set a league-record of a 15-game undefeated streak and total of only three losses, as well as a club-record nine-game undefeated stretch on the road. As well as another regular-season title, and Voyageurs Cup. In 2006, he helped the team to its best start ever at home with a ten-game undefeated streak at Claude-Robillard Sports Complex winning another regular season title, and the club's third Voyageurs Cup. In 2007, he signed a new deal to keep him at the club for the 2007 season. After De Santis was promoted to Manager and Director of Soccer for Montreal Impact in 2008 he was dismissed from his coaching duties.

=== Woodbridge Strikers ===
In 2009, Pinizzotto became involved with Woodbridge Strikers SC as a technical director, and managed their reserve team in the Reserve division of the Canadian Soccer League. In 2014, when Woodbridge became a founding member in League1 Ontario he continued to serve as head coach. After the conclusion of the season he was named League1 Coach of the Year. In 2015 and 2017 he secured for the club the league cup. He also led the team to the league championship final in 2017, and 2018. In 2017, he was inducted into the York Region Soccer Association Hall of Fame. In 2025, he was named the league's Coach of the Year.

== Managerial statistics ==
Team	From	To	Record				
Team	From	To	G	W	L	D	Win %
Toronto Lynx	April 16, 1997	August 21, 2003	190	74	95	34	38.94%
