= Toronto Jets =

The Toronto Jets was a S.S. Pauline Soccer Club team that played in the Minor Division (MD) of the Canadian National Soccer League, formerly the National Soccer League (N.S.L.) between 1977–1979, and perhaps as early as 1976. The 1976 and 1979 teams were the boys under 19 Ontario Cup Champions, and Metro Cup Champions. The 1978 team was the N.S.L. - MD Jr. Playoff Champions.

Over the years, the Jets played the role of a farm team for two teams in the Canadian National Soccer League: Toronto Falcons (NSL) (1977 Playoff Finalists, and 1978 Playoff Champions); and Toronto Italia. In 1990, the Jets played in the Second Division of the National Soccer League, and participated in the NSL Cup tournament. The following season the team was promoted to the First Division, and was a charter member when the NSL merged with the Canadian Soccer League during the 1993 season to form the Canadian National Soccer League. In 1995, Toronto secured the regular season title, and featured in the CNSL Championship final but lost against St. Catharines Roma. The Jets were absorbed into Toronto Italia for the 1996 season after team owner Pasquale Fioccola acquired Italia.

== 1978 roster ==
The following known players from the 1978 team were also members of the 1976 Ontario Provincial U16 Soccer Team:

- John Harris
- Lawrence Locke
- Brian Low
- Peter Pakeman
- Walter Scott

Coach: Mario Perruzza (1977–1979)

Trainer: Douglas Innis (1977-?)

Other Players on 1976 Jets

- Charlie Theuma
- Gord McCallum
- Mike Nichols
- Brad Smythe
- Manny Cassola
- Vito Rygiel
- Vinny
- John Nunes
