= 1997 Canadian National Soccer League season =

Canadian National Soccer League
- Season: 1997
- Champions: St. Catharines Roma Wolves (regular season); St. Catharines Roma Wolves (playoffs, 3rd title)
- League cup: Toronto Supra
- Matches: 24
- Goals: 49 (2.04 per match)
- Biggest home win: Toronto Supra 6-0 London City (July 13)
- Biggest away win: London City 0-8 Toronto Supra (June 20)
- Highest scoring: London City 0-8 Toronto Supra (June 20)

The 1997 Canadian National Soccer League season was the seventy-fifth season for the Canadian National Soccer League. The season began on June 4, 1997, and concluded on October 8, 1997, with St. Catharines Roma Wolves defeating Toronto Supra in a two-game series for the CNSL Championship. While the league cup was awarded to Toronto Supra due to several irregularities on behave of Kosova Albanians.

The season was noteworthy with the return of Toronto Croatia and Hamilton White Eagles after the Canadian International Soccer League (Puma League) decided to merge with the CNSL. A notable departure was Toronto Italia, a well-distinguished club that had another opportunity in 1998 to return to the professional scene but failed to settle disputes regarding territory and league policy. The league operated as a private league for the final time, and under the banner of the CNSL as it reconciled its relationship with the Ontario Soccer Association in 1998. The following season, it would operate as the Canadian Professional Soccer League, sanctioned by the Ontario Soccer Association, to implement the Image of the Game report to provide a suitable professional soccer structure in Ontario and potentially throughout the country.

== Overview ==
=== Summary ===
The number of clubs participating in the 1997 season remained at seven with several notable additions and departures. The additions revolved around the merger between the Canadian International Soccer League (Puma League) and the Canadian National Soccer League (CNSL), which enabled the CNSL to replace the departing clubs. The merger marked the return of Toronto Croatia and Hamilton White Eagles, along with the addition of Kosova Albanians. The Caribbean Stars opted against joining the CNSL as it lacked the financial resources to compete in the league. The departing clubs were Oakville Canadian Western, while Scarborough Astros merged with North York Talons and played their home matches in North York and Scarborough.

A notable absentee was Toronto Italia, an entity with historical significance in Canadian soccer. The departure stemmed from a variety of issues, originally with the Ontario Soccer Association's decision to decertify the CNSL, and a feud involving Toronto Croatia over an alleged debt from the 1995 season. As the USISL A-League expanded to include the Toronto Lynx, the CNSL began to automatically serve as an unofficial feeder system, with Italia's head coach Peter Pinizzotto and several CNSL players being recruited to the Lynx's inaugural roster. The league would ultimately receive official recognition in the 2002 season under its successor league, as both parties would form a player exchange program. Throughout the regular season, controversies abounded as a league meeting was convened in the final quarter of the season, which resulted in the suspension of Hamilton and North York for the remainder of the season. The primary reason for their suspension revolved around the harassment of match officials and unpaid league fees and fines. The league meeting also produced a revised schedule where the final five matches were canceled, which allowed the remaining clubs a berth in the postseason.

=== Teams ===
Team	City	Stadium	Manager
Hamilton White Eagles	Hamilton, Ontario	Brian Timmis Stadium	
Kosova Albanians	North York, Ontario	Esther Shiner Stadium	Jose Valencia
London City	London, Ontario	Cove Road Stadium	Steve Roney
North York Talons	North York, Ontario Scarborough, Ontario	Esther Shiner Stadium Birchmount Stadium	Jorge Armua
St. Catharines Roma Wolves	St. Catharines, Ontario (Vansickle)	Club Roma Stadium	Dino Perri
Toronto Croatia	Etobicoke, Ontario	Centennial Park Stadium	Zlatko Haramincic
Toronto Supra	Toronto, Ontario	Lamport Stadium	Cesar Garcia

Location of CNSL teams outside of Toronto for the 1997 CNSL season.

Location of CNSL teams in Toronto for the 1997 CNSL season.

== Final standings ==
Pos	Team	Pld	W	D	L	GF	GA	GD	Pts	Qualification
1	St. Catharines Roma Wolves (C, O)	7	7	0	0	18	4	+14	21	Qualification for semifinals
2	Toronto Croatia	7	2	2	3	6	8	−2	8	Qualification for semifinals
3	Toronto Supra	4	2	1	1	15	2	+13	7	Qualification for semifinals
4	Kosova Albanians	5	1	2	2	6	8	−2	5	Qualification for first round
5	London City	7	0	1	6	4	27	−23	1	Qualification for first round
6	Hamilton White Eagles	0	0	0	0	0	0	0	0 (Note: Record at time of suspension: 2–1–3 (7 points); 7GF; 8GA)	Suspended by the league
7	North York Talons	0	0	0	0	0	0	0	0 (Note: Record at time of suspension: 1–0–3 (3 points); 5GF; 7GA)	Suspended by the league

Updated to match(es) played on September 7, 1997. Source:
Rules for classification: 1) points; 2) goal difference; 3) number of goals scored.
(C) Champions; (O) Play-off winners

== Playoffs ==
=== First round ===
September 14, 1997	Kosova Albanians	0–3	London City	North York, Ontario
18:00 ET		(Report)	Peter Paterson 81'; John Williams 85'; Howard Buchanan 89'	Stadium: Esther Shiner Stadium; Attendance: 30; Referee: Mike Long

September 19, 1997	London City	1–2	Kosova Albanians	London, Ontario
20:00 ET		(Report)		Stadium: Cove Road Stadium

Series tied 1–1. Kosova wins two 15 minute half mini game 1–0 to win tiebreaker.

=== Semifinals ===
September 12, 1997	Toronto Supra	4–0	Toronto Croatia	Toronto, Ontario
20:00 ET	Handsor 3'; Mike Deluca 27'; Mella 32'; Gary Bryant 67'	(Report)		Stadium: Lamport Stadium; Attendance: 80; Referee: Graham Williams

September 17, 1997	Toronto Croatia	1–4	Toronto Supra	Etobicoke, Ontario
20:00 ET	5' (o.g.)	(Report)	Moore 10', 13', 37'; Mella 63'	Stadium: Centennial Park Stadium; Attendance: 50; Referee: Yakov Keimakh

Toronto Supra wins series 2 games to 0.

September 24, 1997	St. Catharines Roma Wolves	2–1	Kosova Albanians	St. Catharines, Ontario
20:00 ET		(Report)		Stadium: Club Roma Stadium

September 29, 1997	Kosova Albanians	3–3	St. Catharines Roma Wolves	North York, Ontario
20:00 ET	Garvin Huston 50'; Sean Carasquero 68'; Jose Pisco 78'	(Report)	Hughes 3'; Bobby Pretto 62'; Gary McGuchan 64'	Stadium: Esther Shiner Stadium; Attendance: 30; Referee: Yakov Keimakh

St. Catharines Roma Wolves wins series 1 game to 0 (with draw).

=== Finals ===
3 October 1997
20:00 ET

Toronto Supra	0–0	St. Catharines Roma Wolves
	Report

Lamport Stadium, Toronto, Ontario
Referee: Madi Tamashi

GK	1	(Canada) Piotr Libicz
RB	18	(Canada) Chris Handsor
CB	3	Leonardo Simon
CB	2	McIver Broomes
LB	5	Carlos Manuel Lebellos
RM	20	Luiz Ganhao	(substituted off) 45'
CM	8	(Poland) Czeslaw Zajac
CM	6	(Canada) Frank Cardona
LM	7	Mike DeLuca	(substituted off) 45'
ST	9	(Canada) Paul Moore
ST	11	(Canada) Adolfo Mella	(substituted off) 80'
Substitutes:
MF	19	(Canada) Kirby Mitchell	(substituted on) 45'
DF	15	Bart Ostawaski
MF	21	Gerry Bryant	(substituted on) 80'
DF	14	(Canada) Jason Faria
MF	17	Miguel Ferreira	(substituted on) 45'
Manager:
Cesar Garcia

GK	1	(Canada) Dino Perri
RB	2	John McNeil	(substituted off) 61'
CB	7	Tony Carbonara
CB	9	(Canada) Gary Hughes
LB	3	(Canada) Salvatore Borgh
RM	13	(Canada) Lucio Ianiero
CM	16	Keith Moore
CM	20	(Canada) Bobby Pretto
LM	22	Gary McGuchan
ST	19	(Canada) Jerry Cipriani
ST	11	Jamie Perfetti
Substitutes:
MF	14	Anwar Ahmed	(substituted on) 61'
FW	15	(Canada) Luciano Berarocco
Manager:
(Canada) Dino Perri

Assistant referees:
Ivan Calic
Yakov Keimakh

8 October 1997
20:15 ET

St. Catharines Roma Wolves	4–3	Toronto Supra
Cipriani 1', 15'; Gary McGuchan 31'; Arghittu 39'	Report	Mella 10'; Handsor 38'; Moore 48'

Club Roma Stadium, St. Catharines, Ontario
Attendance: 400
Referee: Graham Williams

GK	1	(Canada) Dino Perri
RB	2	John McNeil
CB	7	Tony Carbonara
CB	9	(Canada) Gary Hughes
LB	3	(Canada) Salvatore Borgh
RM	20	(Canada) Bobby Pretto
CM	16	Keith Moore
LM	22	Gary McGuchan
ST	18	(Canada) Carlo Arghittu	(substituted off) 88'
ST	13	(Canada) Lucio Ianiero
ST	19	(Canada) Jerry Cipriani	(substituted off) 79'
Substitutes:
GK	1	Lee Burrows
MF	14	Anwar Ahmed
MF	26	Gary Weinhandl
MF	8	Jamie Perfetti	(substituted on) 79'
FW	15	(Canada) Luciano Berarocco	(substituted on) 88'
Manager:
(Canada) Dino Perri

GK	1	(Canada) Piotr Libicz
RB	4	Miguel Ferreira
CB	3	Leonardo Simon
CB	2	McIver Broomes
LB	5	Carlos Manuel Lebellos	(substituted off) 45'
RM	7	Mike DeLuca	(substituted off) 45'
CM	8	(Poland) Czeslaw Zajac
CM	10	(Canada) Chris Handsor
LM	6	(Canada) Frank Cardona
ST	9	(Canada) Paul Moore
ST	11	(Canada) Adolfo Mella
Substitutes:
MF	19	(Canada) Kirby Mitchell
DF	14	Max Valenzuela
MF	21	Gerry Bryant	(substituted on) 45'
DF	14	(Canada) Jason Faria	(substituted on) 45'
MF	16	Luiz Ganhao
Manager:
Cesar Garcia

Assistant referees:
Stuart Kelly
Ken Thomas

St. Catharines won 4–3 on aggregate.

== Cup ==
The cup tournament was a separate contest from the rest of the season, in which all seven teams took part. All the matches were separate from the regular season. Teams played each other once, home and away, in the Cup competition, and the first-place team would win the Cup competition.

Originally Kosova won the tournament after finishing first in the standings as a result of a greater goal differential. Shortly after, league executives ordered a single finals match to determine the champion. The decision was influenced after Kosovo's president was required to provide a performance cheque for a player who was involved in an altercation with a referee in an earlier match. League executive Michael Di Biase reported that the club officials failed to properly address the request. Though Toronto Croatia finished with similar results, they were disqualified after using an ineligible player. As Hamilton and North York were suspended from league play, the suspension also included their participation in the cup tournament.

In the postseason semifinal match against St. Catharines Roma Wolves, the game was delayed when Kosova's president declared his club as cup champions after presenting a trophy to Kosova. Consequently, the league officials canceled the final match and automatically declared Toronto Supra as league cup champions. In response to the decision, Kosova protested the league's actions and subsequently withdrew from the CNSL.

=== Standings ===
Pos	Team	Pld	W	D	L	GF	GA	GD	Pts	Qualification
1	Kosova Albanians	8	4	2	2	21	11	+10	14	Qualification for Playoffs
2	Toronto Supra (C)	8	4	2	2	21	14	+7	14	Qualification for Playoffs
3	Toronto Croatia	8	4	2	2	14	12	+2	14	
4	St. Catharines Roma Wolves	8	3	1	4	13	13	0	10	
5	London City	8	1	1	6	9	28	−19	4	

Updated to match(es) played on September 7, 1997. Source: http://www.rocketrobinsoccerintoronto.com/97cnsl14.htm
Rules for classification: 1) points; 2) goal difference; 3) number of goals scored.
(C) Champions

=== Matches ===
June 13, 1997	London City	0–4	North York Talons	London, Ontario
20:00		Report		Stadium: Cove Road Stadium

June 18, 1997	St. Catharines Roma Wolves	2–1	North York Talons	St. Catharines, Ontario
20:15		Report		Stadium: Club Roma Stadium

June 29, 1997	Toronto Supra	8–1	London City	Toronto, Ontario
19:30	Handsor 14'; Gerald Gallacher 22' (o.g.); Ionadi 28'; Moore 37', 44'; Cardona 80'; Kirby Mitchell 82'; Mella 87'	Report	Gebczynski 40'	Stadium: Lamport Stadium; Attendance: 150; Referee: Gene Bainbridge

July 2, 1997	St. Catharines Roma Wolves	2–0	London City	St. Catharines, Ontario
20:15		Report		Stadium: Club Roma Stadium

July 4, 1997	Toronto Supra	4–2	St. Catharines Roma Wolves	Toronto, Ontario
20:30				Stadium: Lamport Stadium; Attendance: 100; Referee: Angus Black

July 9, 1997	St. Catharines Roma Wolves	3–0	Hamilton White Eagles	St. Catharines, Ontario
20:15		Report		Stadium: Club Roma Stadium

July 9, 1997	Toronto Croatia	2–0	North York Talons	Etobicoke, Ontario
20:00	Darko Pantolon 27'; Ante Musa 30'	Report		Stadium: Centennial Park Stadium; Attendance: 100; Referee: Hugh Elliott

July 11, 1997	London City	2–1	Toronto Croatia	London, Ontario
20:00		Report		Stadium: Cove Road Stadium

July 12, 1997	Kosova Albanians	0–1	North York Talons	North York, Ontario
20:00		Report	Gary DeLeon 46'	Stadium: Esther Shiner Stadium; Referee: Teddy Tanashi

July 16, 1997	St. Catharines Roma Wolves	0–1	Toronto Croatia	St. Catharines, Ontario
20:15		Report		Stadium: Club Roma Stadium

July 18, 1997	Toronto Supra	3–0	North York Talons	Toronto, Ontario
20:30	Handsor 71', 79'; Marcelo Castillo 88'	Report		Stadium: Lamport Stadium; Attendance: 100; Referee: Hugh Grant

July 20, 1997	North York Talons	1–1	Toronto Croatia	North York, Ontario
16:00	Gary DeLeon 54'	Report	Ante Musa 20'	Stadium: Esther Shiner Stadium; Attendance: 60; Referee: Peter Eleftehoglou

July 20, 1997	Hamilton White Eagles	1–1	St. Catharines Roma Wolves	Hamilton, Ontario
19:30		Report		Stadium: Brian Timmis Stadium

July 23, 1997	North York Talons	0–3	Kosova Albanians	Scarborough, Ontario
20:00		Report		Stadium: Birchmount Stadium

July 25, 1997	London City	2–2	Toronto Supra	London, Ontario
20:00		Report		Stadium: Cove Road Stadium

July 26, 1997	Kosova Albanians	1–1	St. Catharines Roma Wolves	North York, Ontario
20:00	Gentian Cara 63'	Report	Gary McCuchan 42'	Stadium: Esther Shiner Stadium; Attendance: 80; Referee: Yakov Keimakh

July 27, 1997	North York Talons	0–2	London City	North York, Ontario
16:00		Report	Dominique 9', 41'	Stadium: Esther Shiner Stadium; Attendance: 30; Referee: Yakov Keimakh

July 27, 1997	Hamilton White Eagles	0–1	Toronto Supra	Hamilton, Ontario
19:30		Report		Stadium: Brian Timmis Stadium

July 30, 1997	Toronto Croatia	3–1	Toronto Supra	Etobicoke, Ontario
20:00	Iglic 4'; Bulku 40'; John Marsonovic 79'	Report	Mella 87'	Stadium: Brian Timmis Stadium; Attendance: 100; Referee: Graham Williams

July 30, 1997	St. Catharines Roma Wolves	1–2	Kosova Albanians	St. Catharines, Ontario
20:15		Report		Stadium: Club Roma Stadium

August 2, 1997	Kosova Albanians	2–4	Toronto Supra	North York, Ontario
20:00	Martin Quiroz 8'; Garvin Huston 41'	Report	Mella 1'; Henrique Ferreira 38'; Jason Faria 82'; Moore 91'	Stadium: Esther Shiner Stadium; Attendance: 80; Referee: Yakov Keimakh

August 6, 1997	Toronto Croatia	1–3	St. Catharines Roma Wolves	Etobicoke, Ontario
20:00		Report		Stadium: Centennial Park Stadium

August 8, 1997	London City	2–3	St. Catharines Roma Wolves	London, Ontario
20:00		Report		Stadium: Cove Road Stadium

August 9, 1997	Kosova Albanians	4–4	Toronto Croatia	North York, Ontario
20:00	Yuri Castillo 15'; Biron Vargas 20', 35'; Marco Ponce 47'	Report	Tomi Milkovic 50'; Ante Musa 62'; Ivica Zelic 64'; Zoran Maryanovic 73'	Stadium: Esther Shiner Stadium; Referee: Yakov Keimakh

August 13, 1997	Toronto Croatia	1–0	Kosova Albanians	Etobicoke, Ontario
20:00	Zoran Marjanovic 34'	Report		Stadium: Centennial Park Stadium; Attendance: 100; Referee: Yakov Keimakh

August 15, 1997	Toronto Supra	0–0	Toronto Croatia	Toronto, Ontario
20:30		Report		Stadium: Lamport Stadium; Attendance: 100

August 22, 1997	Toronto Supra	0–3	Kosova Albanians	Toronto, Ontario
20:30		Report	Garvin Huston 34'; Gentian Cara 79'; Biron Vargas 87'	Stadium: Lamport Stadium; Attendance: 100

August 27, 1997	Toronto Croatia	3–2	London City	Etobicoke, Ontario
20:00	Ante Bralo 5'; Ante Musa 19'; Leo Marasovic 84'	Report	Michael Gauthier 27'; Tonino Commisso 78'	Stadium: Centennial Park Stadium; Attendance: 100; Referee: Ken Thomas

August 27, 1997	St. Catharines Roma Wolves	1–2	Toronto Supra	St. Catharines, Ontario
20:15		Report		Stadium: Club Roma Stadium

August 29, 1997	London City	0–2	Kosova Albanians	London, Ontario
20:00		Report		Stadium: Cove Road Stadium

September 7, 1997	Kosova Albanians	7–0	London City	North York, Ontario
18:00	Biron Vargas 13', 51', 57', 90'; Francis Rigoult 34'; Garvin Huston 55'; Sean Carasquero 91'	Report		Stadium: Esther Shiner Stadium; Attendance: 100; Referee: Valentine Karagine
