= 2001 Canadian Professional Soccer League season =

Canadian Professional Soccer League
- Season: 2001
- Champions: St. Catharines Wolves
- Regular Season title: Ottawa Wizards
- Matches: 132
- Goals: 441 (3.34 per match)
- Top goalscorer: Kevin Nelson (Ottawa Wizards)
- Best goalkeeper: George Azcurra; Luciano Miranda
- Biggest home win: Montreal Dynamites 9-2 Durham Flames (September 2, 2001)
- Biggest away win: Glen Shields Sun Devils 1-8 Toronto Supra (June 3, 2001)
- Highest scoring: Montreal Dynamites 9-2 Durham Flames (September 2, 2001)

The 2001 Canadian Professional Soccer League season was the fourth season for the Canadian Professional Soccer League. The season began on May 25, 2001 and concluded on October 14, 2001 with St. Catharines Wolves defeating Toronto Supra by a score of 1-0 to win their second CPSL Championship (known as the Rogers CPSL Cup for sponsorship reasons) . The final was hosted in St. Catharines with Club Roma Stadium as the venue, while the match received coverage from Rogers TV. The season saw the league expand to a total of 12 teams, and went beyond the GTA and Ontario border to include a Montreal and Ottawa franchise. Throughout the regular season the Ottawa Wizards became the first club to end the Toronto Olympians league title dynasty. The CPSL also launched the CPSL Soccer Show with Rogers TV providing the broadcasting, and granting Rogers naming rights to the CPSL Championship. Other major sponsors included the Government of Canada, which served as the sole sponsor for the CPSL Rookie of the Year Award. The league also announced a working partnership with the Canadian United Soccer League a task force originally started by the Canadian Soccer Association in order forge a unified professional structure with the cooperation of the Canadian franchises in the USL A-League to launch a Canadian first and second division domestic league.

== Changes from 2000 season ==
All 8 clubs from the previous season returned, and the league expanded to include 4 new entries the Brampton Hitmen, Montreal Dynamites, Ottawa Wizards, and Toronto Supra all began play this year. Oshawa Flames changed their name to the Durham Flames in order to represent the entire Durham Region, and received sponsorship from Danone. Toronto Croatia transferred their home venue from Centennial Park Stadium to Memorial Park in Streetsville, Mississauga. Changes to the CPSL executive management committee saw former Director of Media Relations for the Toronto Lynx Stan Adamson appointed to the position of CPSL Director of Media and Public Relations.

== Teams ==
Team	City	Stadium	Manager
Brampton Hitmen	Brampton, Ontario (Bramalea)	Victoria Park Stadium	Paul Kitson
Durham Flames	Oshawa, Ontario (Vanier)	Oshawa Civic Stadium	Danny Stewart
Glen Shields Sun Devils	Vaughan, Ontario (Thornhill)	Dufferin District Field	Dave Benning
London City	London, Ontario (Westmount)	Cove Road Stadium	Jurek Gebczynski
Montreal Dynamites	Laval, Quebec	Centre Sportif Bois-de-Boulogne	Zoran Jankovic
North York Astros	Toronto, Ontario (North York)	Esther Shiner Stadium	Tony LaFerrara
Ottawa Wizards	Ottawa, Ontario (Carp)	OZ Optics Stadium	Rasim Kara
St. Catharines Wolves	St. Catharines, Ontario (Vansickle)	Club Roma Stadium	Lucio Ianiero
Toronto Croatia	Mississauga, Ontario (Streetsville)	Memorial Park	Bruno Pilaš
Toronto Olympians	Toronto, Ontario (Scarborough)	Birchmount Stadium	David Gee
Toronto Supra	Toronto, Ontario (Brockton)	Brockton Stadium	Cesar Garcia
York Region Shooters	Richmond Hill, Ontario (Crosby)	Crosby Field	Adam Pagliaroli

Location of CPSL teams outside of Toronto for the 2001 CPSL season.

Location of CPSL teams in Toronto for the 2001 CPSL season.

== Final standings ==
Pos	Team	Pld	W	D	L	GF	GA	GD	Pts	Qualification
1	Ottawa Wizards	22	16	3	3	51	16	+35	51	Qualification for Playoffs
2	Toronto Olympians	22	15	1	6	50	21	+29	46	Qualification for Playoffs
3	Toronto Supra	22	12	5	5	44	22	+22	41	Qualification for Playoffs
4	Montreal Dynamites	22	12	3	7	46	32	+14	39	Qualification for Playoffs
5	St. Catharines Roma Wolves	22	11	5	6	43	28	+15	38	Qualification for Playoffs
6	Toronto Croatia	22	10	5	7	32	29	+3	35	
7	Glen Shields Sun Devils	22	8	3	11	30	43	−13	27	
8	Brampton Hitmen	22	7	5	10	28	41	−13	26	
9	North York Astros	22	7	3	12	30	32	−2	24	
10	Durham Flames	22	7	3	12	39	53	−14	24	
11	York Region Shooters	22	4	3	15	29	58	−29	15	
12	London City	22	2	3	17	19	66	−47	9	

Updated to match(es) played on October, 2001. Source: http://www.rocketrobinsoccerintoronto.com/01cpwk21.htm
Rules for classification: 1) points; 2) goal difference; 3) number of goals scored.

== Rogers CPSL Championship playoffs ==
=== Wildcard ===
October 12, 2001	St. Catharines Wolves	2–1	Montreal Dynamites	St. Catharines, Ontario
8:15 ET	Frank Zumpano 45'; Gary McGutchan 65'	(Report)	Selaidopoulos 18'	Stadium: Club Roma Stadium

=== Semifinals ===
October 13, 2001	Toronto Olympians	2–3 (a.e.t.)	Toronto Supra	St. Catharines, Ontario
1:00 ET	Courtney Denis 63'; Thomas 70'	(Report)	Michael Diluca 74'; Samuel Afriyie 78' 97'	Stadium: Club Roma Stadium; Attendance: 300; Referee: Mike Lambert (Ontario)

October 13, 2001	Ottawa Wizards	0–1	St. Catharines Wolves	St. Catharines, Ontario
3:00 ET		(Report)	Gary McGutchan 43'	Stadium: Club Roma Stadium; Attendance: 300; Referee: Amato De Luca (Ontario)

=== Consolation final ===
October 14, 2001	Ottawa Wizards	2–5	Toronto Olympians	St. Catharines, Ontario
12:00 ET	Nelson 43'; Gilbert Iloanusi 82'	(Report)	Danny Sanna 62'; Danny Ziannis 70'; John Williams 75'; Dave Mancini 82'; Mario Andrijanic 90' (og)	Stadium: Club Roma Stadium; Attendance: 300; Referee: Gord Arrowsmith (Ontario)

=== Rogers CPSL Championship ===
October 14
2:00 ET

St. Catharines Roma Wolves	1–0	Toronto Supra
John Sozio 116'	Report

Club Roma Stadium, St. Catharines, Ontario
Attendance: 300
Referee: Steve Mortimer (Ontario)

GK	1	(Canada) Dino Perri (c)
RB	13	(Canada) Lucio Ianiero	(substituted off) 27'
CB	2	(Canada) Dan Gallagher
CB	19	(Canada) Gary Hughes
LB	10	Tony Carbonara
RM	4	(Canada) Salvatore Borgh	(substituted off) 58'
CM	16	(United States) Andrew McKay	(substituted off) 72'
CM	14	(Canada) John Sozio
LM	22	Gary McGutchan
ST	9	Frank Zumpano
ST	18	(Canada) Carlo Arghittu	(substituted off) 76'
Substitutes:
GK	20	(Canada) Jay Mason
DF	3	Al Reinhart
DF	7	(Canada) Jerry Cipriani	(substituted on) 76'
DF	21	Joe Carbonara	(substituted on) 27'
MF	11	Andrew Weiring	(substituted on) 72'
MF	6	Keith Moore	(substituted on) 58'
FW	12	(Canada) Simon Gatti
Manager:
(Canada) Lucio Ianiero

GK	1	(Canada) Garrett Caldwell
RB	21	(Canada) Jason Faria (c)
CB	4	Mike Fedoruk	(substituted off) 116'
CB	3	(Canada) Leonardo Simon
LB	14	Amilcar Pascoal
RM	15	Fred Perreira	(substituted off) 45'
CM	6	(Canada) Peyvand Mossavat
CM	8	(Argentina) Christian Lombardo	(substituted off) 57'
LM	10	Pedro Dias
CF	9	Christopher Santos	(substituted off) 24'
CF	13	Samuel Afriyie
Substitutes:
GK	12	Michael Silva
DF	7	(Canada) Paulo Valdez	(substituted on) 45'
DF	5	Alford James
MF	20	Francis Righault	(substituted on) 57'
MF	18	Selmir Sehic
FW	11	(South Africa) Ryan Gamble	(substituted on) 24'
FW	16	Steven Coito	(substituted on) 116'
Manager:
Victor Cameira

Rogers CPSL Championship MVP:

Garrett Caldwell (Toronto Supra)
Danny Gallagher (St. Catharines Roma Wolves)

Assistant referees:
Steve Cahoon
Domenic Rossetto
Fourth official:
Vito Curalli

== All-Star game ==
For the 2001 season the CPSL administration arranged two all-star matches for the league. In order to prepare for the 2001 Jeux de la Francophonie the Morocco national under-23 football team expressed a desire to play a solid Canadian team. Subsequently, the Canadian Soccer Association requested the CPSL to arrange a select team for the match. The second match consisted of a CPSL All-Star team against C.S. Marítimo of the Primeira Liga.

July 6, 2001	CPSL Selects	1 - 1	Morocco U-23	Carp, Ontario
7:30 pm	Willy Giummarra 61'	Report	Omar Share 53'	Stadium: OZ Optics Stadium

July 25, 2001	CPSL All-Stars	0 - 4	C.S. Marítimo	London, Ontario
7:30 pm		Report	Gaúcho 15'; Bruno Fernandes 45'; Richardson 50'; Joaquim Ferraz 74'	Stadium: Cove Road Stadium

CPSL Selects
Pos.	Name	Team
Squad
GK	Dino Perri	St. Catharines Roma Wolves
D	Bayete Smith	Toronto Olympians
D	Danny Sanna	Toronto Olympians
D	Kurt Ramsey	North York Astros
D	Kwame Telamaque	Ottawa Wizards
MF	Lucio Ianiero	St. Catharines Roma Wolves
MF	Dejan Gluscevic (c)	North York Astros
MF	Goran Zankovic	North York Astros
MF	Leo Incollingo	Montreal Dynamites
F	Jerry Pean	Montreal Dynamites
F	Willy Giummarra	Toronto Olympians
Squad
GK	Richard Goddard	Ottawa Wizards
D	Russell Shaw	Ottawa Wizards
D	Andrew Waring	Ottawa Wizards
D	Gary Hughes	St. Catharines Roma Wolves
MF	Orlando Rizzo	York Region Shooters
MF	Dave McDonald	Glen Shields Sun Devils
F	John Matas	Toronto Olympians
F	Jimmy Kuzmanovski	Durham Flames
F	Mario Andrijanic	Ottawa Wizards
F	Marc Enguene	Ottawa Wizards
Head coach
	Tony La Ferrara	North York Astros

CPSL All-Stars
Pos.	Name	Team
Squad
GK	Dino Perri	St. Catharines Roma Wolves
D	Bayete Smith	Toronto Olympians
D	Tony Marshall	Toronto Olympians
D	Danny Sanna	Toronto Olympians
D	Tyler Hemming	London City
MF	Willy Giummarra	Toronto Olympians
MF	Lucio Ianiero (c)	St. Catharines Roma Wolves
MF	O'Neil Brown	Durham Flames
MF	Gentjan Dervishi	London City
F	Eddy Berdusco	Toronto Olympians
F	Carlo Arghittu	St. Catharines Roma Wolves
Squad
GK	Brian Bowes	Toronto Olympians
D	Kurt Ramsey	North York Astros
D	Danny Gallagher	St. Catharines Roma Wolves
D	Dave McDonald	Glen Shields Sun Devils
D	Peyvand Mossavat	Toronto Supra
MF	Marcelo Garcia	North York Astros
MF	Orlando Rizzo	York Region Shooters
MF	Leo Incollingo	Montreal Dynamites
MF	Samir Karaga	Toronto Croatia
MF	Phil Ionadi	Brampton Hitmen
F	John Matas	Toronto Olympians
F	Ryan Gamble	Toronto Supra
F	Semir Mesanovic	London City
F	Sanjeev Parmar	Ottawa Wizards
Head coach
	Tony La Ferrara	North York Astros

== 2001 scoring leaders ==
Full article: CSL Golden Boot

Position	Player's name	Nationality	Club	Goals
1	Kevin Nelson	Trinidad and Tobago	Ottawa Wizards	23
2	Abraham Osman	Uganda	Ottawa Wizards	17
3	Samuel Afriyie	Canada	Toronto Supra	15
4	Frank Zumpano	Canada	St. Catharines Wolves	14
5	Eddy Berdusco	Canada	Toronto Olympians	12
6	Bruno Nue	Canada	Montreal Dynamites	12
7	Ryan Gamble	Canada	Toronto Supra	11
8	Gary Hughes	Canada	St. Catharines Wolves	10
9	Peter Curic	Canada	Toronto Croatia	9
10	Dejan Gluscevic	(Federal Republic of Yugoslavia) FR Yugoslavia	North York Astros	9

== CPSL Executive Committee ==
The 2001 CPSL Executive Committee.

Position	Name	Nationality
Chairman:	Vincent Ursini	(Canada) Canadian
Director of Operations:	Chris Bellamy	(Canada) Canadian
Director of Discipline:	Clifford Dell	(Canada) Canadian
Director of Officials:	Tony Camacho	(Portugal) Portuguese
Treasurer:	Peter Li Preti	(Canada) Canadian
Legal Counsel:	Ira Greenspoon	(Canada) Canadian

== Individual awards ==
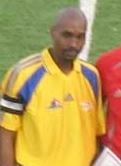
Kurt Ramsey was voted the Defender of the Year

The annual CPSL awards ceremony was held on October 14, 2001 at Club Roma in St. Catharines, Ontario. Expansion franchise Ottawa Wizards received the most awards with 3 wins. Trinidadian journeyman Kevin Nelson went home with both the Golden Boot, and the Rookie of the Year. While his teammate Abraham Osman was given the MVP. George Azcurra shared his second Goalkeeper of the Year award with Luciano Miranda.

Kurt Ramsey of the North York Astros won the Defender of the Year, and former Montreal Impact manager Zoran Jankovic went home with the Coach of the Year. Amato De Luca who later refereed matches at the international level and Major League Soccer was named the Referee of the Year. Durham Flames received the Fair Play award.

Award	Player (Club)
CPSL Most Valuable Player	Abraham Osman (Ottawa Wizards)
CPSL Golden Boot	Kevin Nelson (Ottawa Wizards)
CPSL Goalkeeper of the Year Award	George Azcurra (Toronto Croatia); Luciano Miranda (North York Astros)
CPSL Defender of the Year Award	Kurt Ramsey (North York Astros)
CPSL Rookie of the Year Award	Kevin Nelson (Ottawa Wizards)
CPSL Coach of the Year Award	Zoran Jankovic (Montreal Dynamites)
CPSL Referee of the Year Award	Amato De Luca
CPSL Fair Play Award	Durham Flames
