= José Guerra =

José Guerra may refer to:

- José Francisco Guerra (born 1968), Spanish fencer
- José Guerra (diver) (born 1979), Cuban diver
- José Guerra (footballer, born 1994), Panamanian footballer
- Jose Guerra (Canadian soccer), Canadian soccer player.
- José Guerra (economist) (born 1956), Venezuelan economist, writer and politician
