= Nicolas Pinto =

Canadian soccer player

Personal information
- Place of birth: Quebec, Canada
- Position: Goalkeeper

Senior career*
Years	Team	Apps	(Gls)
2000	Montreal Impact	2	(0)
2001–2005	Montreal/Laval Dynamites	30	(0)
- * Club domestic league appearances and goals

Nicolas Pinto is a former Canadian soccer player who had stints in the USL A-League and the Canadian Professional Soccer League.

== Playing career ==
Pinto began his professional career in 2000, with the Montreal Impact in the USL A-League. He was one of the several new signings conducted by new Montreal head coach Zoran Jankovic. During his tenure with Montreal he mostly served as a backup goalkeeper, and appeared in two matches. On May 16, 2001, he was signed by newly expansion franchise Montreal Dynamites of the Canadian Professional Soccer League. He helped Montreal finish fourth in the overall standings, thus qualifying for the playoffs. In the playoffs the Dynamites faced St. Catharines Wolves, but were defeated by a score of 2–1. Pinto returned to the organization for the 2002 season. Montreal would finish second in the Eastern Conference and secure a postseason berth. The club was eliminated early on in a wildcard match against the Metro Lions in a 3–1 defeat.

In 2004, the Dynamites took a sabbatical for the 2004 season, which resulted in Pinto re-signing with the organization for the 2005 season. The Laval franchise finished third in the Eastern Conference, and reached the quarterfinals.
