= Jawad El Andaloussi =

Moroccan footballer

Personal information
- Full name: Abbad Jawad El Andaloussi
- Date of birth: 15 July 1955 (age 71)
- Place of birth: Casablanca, Morocco

International career
Years	Team	Apps	(Gls)
1976–1981	Morocco		

Managerial career
- 2003: Laval Dynamites
- 2006: Laval Dynamites

Abbad Jawad El Andaloussi (Arabic: جواد الأندلسي) is a Moroccan footballer who played for Morocco in the 1976 and 1978 African Cup of Nations. At club level he played for Wydad, Raja Casablanca, Saudi Arabia's Al-Shabab and Hong Kong's Tung Sing FC.

== International career ==
El Andaloussi played for Morocco in the 1976 and 1978 African Cup of Nations. He also played for the Morocco national football team in the 1982 FIFA World Cup qualification.

== Managerial career ==
El Andaloussi began coaching the Laval Dynamites in the Canadian Professional Soccer League in 2003. In his debut season with Laval the team failed to qualify for the postseason for the first time in the club's history, missing the final playoff spot by one point. He resigned from his position as head coach at the conclusion of the season. He returned to the organization in 2006 and his signing was announced in a press conference. He brought in Arturo Cisneros Salas, Andrew Olivieri, Hicham Aâboubou, Rachid Madkour, and Abraham Francois. El Andaloussi had a successful season, with Laval finishing third in the National Division and making the postseason for the second year in a row for the franchise. Laval faced Toronto Croatia in the quarterfinals and were defeated 1–0.
