= Jean-Robert Toussaint =

Canadian soccer player (born 1966)

Personal information
- Full name: Jean-Robert Toussaint Jr
- Date of birth: 5 April 1966 (age 60)
- Place of birth: Limbé, Haiti
- Height: 1.65 m (5 ft 5 in)
- Position: Midfielder

College career
Years	Team	Apps	(Gls)
1985–1988	Hartford Hawks		

Senior career*
Years	Team	Apps	(Gls)
1988–1992	Montreal Supra	20	(1)
1995	New Hampshire Ramblers	5	(0)

International career
1984	Canada U19		

Managerial career
- 2005: Laval Dynamites
- * Club domestic league appearances and goals

Jean-Robert Toussaint (born 5 April 1966) is a former soccer player who had stints in the USISL Pro League, and the Canadian Soccer League. Born in Haiti, he represented Canada at youth international level.

== Professional career ==
Toussaint began his career in the Canadian Soccer League in 1988 with the Montreal Supra, and had a stint with the New Hampshire Ramblers of the USISL Pro League in 1995. In 2005, he was appointed head coach for the Laval Dynamites of the Canadian Professional Soccer League. He brought in the likes of Nicolas Lesage, Rachid Madkour, and Mohamed Ridouani. He achieved a third-place finish in the Eastern Conference which secured a postseason berth for the club. In the playoffs, he led Laval to the semi-finals where they faced Toronto Croatia, but lost to a score of 1–0.

== Personal life ==
Toussaint's son Cédric is also a soccer player.

He was a coach for the Dragons of the Collège Saint-Jean Vianney.
