= Jocelyn Roy =

Canadian former soccer player (born 1973)

Personal information
- Date of birth: July 15, 1973 (age 53)
- Place of birth: Granby, Quebec
- Height: 1.75 m (5 ft 9 in)
- Position: Striker

Senior career*
Years	Team	Apps	(Gls)
1998–1999	Milwaukee Wave (indoor)	31	(5)
1999–2000	Montreal Impact (indoor)	44	(36)
2000	Montreal Impact	6	(0)
2000–2001	Toronto ThunderHawks (indoor)	40	(30)
2001	Montreal Dynamites	16	(1)

International career
2005-2010	Canada Beach soccer	6	(2)
- * Club domestic league appearances and goals

Jocelyn Roy (born July 15, 1973) is a Canadian former soccer player who played in the National Professional Soccer League, USL A-League, and the Canadian Professional Soccer League.

== Playing career ==
Roy began his professional career in 1998, with Milwaukee Wave in the National Professional Soccer League. In his debut season with Milwaukee he registered five goals in 31 matches and reached the Conference semi-finals, but were eliminated from the playoffs after losing to Philadelphia KiXX. The following indoor season he signed with Montreal Impact, and had a tremendous season with the organization scoring 36 goals in 44 matches. In 2000, he played with Montreal during the outdoor season, but after Zoran Jankovic was dismissed as head coach and replaced with Valero Gazzola he was released from his contract.

Roy returned to the NPSL in the winter of 2000 to sign with the Toronto ThunderHawks, where he would finish with 30 goals in 40 matches. In 2001, he was re-united with former Montreal Impact head coach Jankovic and signed to a contract with Montreal Dynamites in the Canadian Professional Soccer League. Near the conclusion of the season the organization faced financial difficulties, which resulted in the release of Joy from his contract after rejecting a pay cut to his salary.
