= Roldege Arius =

Canadian former soccer player

Personal information
- Date of birth: June 17, 1977 (age 49)
- Place of birth: Port-au-Prince, Haiti
- Position: Midfielder

Senior career*
| Years | Team | Apps | (Gls) |
| 1995–1996 | Chicago Power (indoor) | 30 | (4) |
| 1996–1997 | Toronto Shooting Stars (indoor) | 4 | (0) |
| 1997–1998 | Vermont Voltage | 15 | (1) |
| 1999 | Seacoast United Phantoms | 4 | (0) |
| 2001 | Montreal Dynamites | 5 | (0) |
| 2003 | Ottawa Wizards | 3 | (0) |
- * Club domestic league appearances and goals

Roldege Arius (born June 17, 1977) is a Canadian former soccer player who played in the USISL D-3 Pro League, National Professional Soccer League, and the Canadian Professional Soccer League.

== Playing career ==
Arius began his professional career at the indoor level with Chicago Power of the National Professional Soccer League in 1995. With Chicago he appeared in 30 matches and recorded four goals. The following indoor season he signed with Toronto Shooting Stars, where he appeared in four matches. In 1997, he was drafted by the Montreal Impact of the USL A-League, but was offered a contract with the Vermont Voltage. In 1999, he played with the Seacoast United Phantoms.

On March 25, 2001 Arius was signed by expansion franchise the Montreal Dynamites of the Canadian Professional Soccer League. He appeared in the postseason wildcard match, where Montreal faced St. Catharines Wolves during the match he was ejected and the game concluded in a 2-1 victory for St. Catharines. In 2003, he signed with the Ottawa Wizards, and during his tenure with the organization he helped Ottawa claim the Eastern Conference title by going undefeated the entire season.
