= Leo Incollingo =

Canadian former soccer player (born 1978)

Personal information
- Full name: Leonardo Incollingo
- Date of birth: September 21, 1978 (age 48)
- Place of birth: Montreal, Quebec, Canada
- Position: Midfielder

Senior career*
Years	Team	Apps	(Gls)
1997	Vermont Voltage		
1997–1998	Milwaukee Wave (indoor)	1	(0)
1997–1998	Montreal Impact (indoor)	1	(0)
1998–1999	Milwaukee Wave (indoor)	13	(1)
1999–2000	Montreal Impact (indoor)	16	(2)
1998–2000	Montreal Impact	7	(0)
2001–2006	Montreal/Laval Dynamites		
- * Club domestic league appearances and goals

Leo Incollingo (born September 21, 1978) is a Canadian former soccer player who played in the USISL D-3 Pro League, USL A-League, National Professional Soccer League, and the Canadian Professional Soccer League.

== Playing career ==
Incollingo began his career in 1997, with Vermont Voltage of the USISL D-3 Pro League. In 1998, he signed with the Montreal Impact of the USL A-League. In his debut season with Montreal he helped the club finish second in the Northeast division, and reach the Conference semi-finals in the playoffs. In 2000, he was re-united with former head coach Zoran Jankovic, but soon after Jankovic was dismissed after only four matches, and Incollingo was released from his contract. In 2001, he was re-united for the third time with Jankovic who became the new head coach for the Montreal Dynamites of the Canadian Professional Soccer League and signed him to a contract. With the Dynamites he served as the team captain and helped Montreal finish fourth in the overall standings. In the playoffs the Dynamites faced St. Catharines Wolves, but were defeated by a score of 2-1.

He also played indoor soccer in the National Professional Soccer League having stints with Milwaukee Wave where he appeared in a total of fourteen matches, and also played with Montreal Impact's indoor squad appearing 17 matches.
