= Victor Petkov =

Bulgarian football manager

Viktor Petkov is a former Bulgarian soccer head coach who had stints in the USISL Pro League, and the Canadian Professional Soccer League.

== Managerial career ==
Petkov served as the general manager with the New Hampshire Ramblers of the USISL Pro League in 1995. After his stint at the professional level he coached with various amateur Quebec clubs, most notably with AS Jean-Talon Rosemont where he won the Quebec cup and Montreal Championship. In 2002, he returned to the professional level to work as a general manager for the Laval Dynamites of the Canadian Professional Soccer League. On August 30, 2002 he was appointed head coach for the organization to replace Mohamed Hilen for the remainder of the 2002 season. Petkov led Laval to a second-place finish in the Eastern Conference and secured a postseason berth for the franchise. The club was eliminated early on in a wildcard match against the Metro Lions in a 3-1 defeat.
