= Alexander McEwan (footballer) =

Scottish footballer

Personal information
- Date of birth: 15 May 1970 (age 56)
- Place of birth: Glasgow, Scotland
- Position: Midfielder

Youth career
- Rangers Amateurs

Senior career*
Years	Team	Apps	(Gls)
1986–1989	Rangers	0	(0)
1989–1992	St Mirren	4	(1)
1992–1994	Greenock Morton	20	(8)
1993	→ St. Catharines Roma (loan)		
1994–1996	Albion Rovers	19	(3)
- * Club domestic league appearances and goals

Alexander McEwan (born 15 May 1970) is a Scottish former footballer.

== Career ==
McEwan began playing at youth level with Rangers Amateurs B.C. and in 1986 he signed with Glasgow Rangers. In 1989, he played in the Scottish Premier Division with St Mirren F.C. In 1992, he played in the Scottish Football League First Division with Greenock Morton F.C. in the 1992–93 season. In 1993, he was loaned to play in the Canadian National Soccer League with St. Catharines Roma. He returned for the 1993–94 season where he featured in 18 matches and recorded six goals.

In 1994, he played in the Scottish Football League Third Division with Albion Rovers F.C.
