= Laval Dynamites =

Former Canadian association football team

- Full name: Laval Dynamites
- Nickname: Les Dynamites
- Founded: 1997 (as Montreal Dynamites)
- Dissolved: 2007
- Stadium: Centre Sportif Bois-de-Boulogne at Laval city
- Capacity: 1,000
- Chairman: Tony Iannitto
- Manager: Jawad El Andaloussi
- League: CPSL/CSL
- 2006: 3rd, Playoff Quarter Final
| Home colours | Away colours |

Laval Dynamites (French: Dynamites de Laval) were a Canadian soccer team, founded in 1997. The men's team (founded in 2001) was a member of the Canadian Professional Soccer League/Canadian Soccer League, the highest professional soccer league in Canada, and played in the National Division. The team played as the Montreal Dynamites in 2001 and 2002. The team essentially moved to Trois-Rivières and became the Trois-Rivières Attak for the 2007 season.

The Dynamites played their home games at Centre Sportif Bois-de-Boulogne in the city of Laval, Quebec. The team's colors were red and white.

The men's team was a sister organization of the women's Laval Dynamites team, which played in the United Soccer Leagues W-League, the second tier of women's soccer in the United States and Canada. The women's team played 1997 to 2001.

== History ==
Montreal Dynamites joined the CPSL in 2001 as an expansion franchise along with Ottawa Wizards, Brampton Hitmen, and the Toronto Supra. The club was formed by a collective effort by majority shareholder Pierre Marchand, and a new group of investors which consisted of Tony Incollingo, Pietro Petruccelli and Franco Morina, a group of Montreal businessmen active in the ranks of the Quebec amateur soccer. Marchand served as the president, while Incollingo operated as the general manager. The organization hired the services of former Montreal Impact head coach Zoran Jankovic. He brought in many of his former Montreal Impact players like Nicolas Pinto, Kyriakos Selaidopolous, Leo Incollingo, Jocelyn Roy, Abraham Francois, David Fronimadis, Chris Stathopoulos, and USL veterans Philippe-Andre Moreau, Roldege Arius, and Jose Guerra.

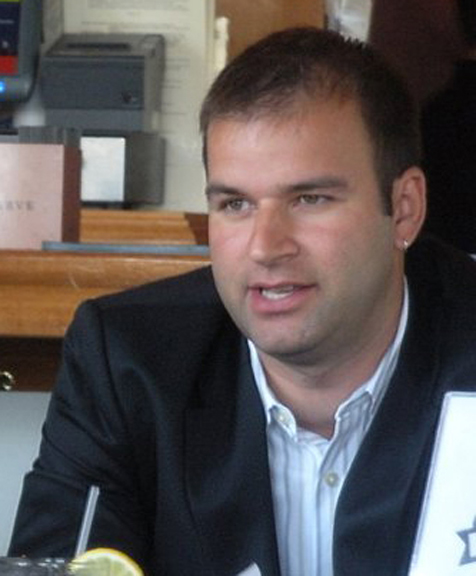
Kyt Selaidopoulos was one of the many former Montreal Impact players brought in to establish the club.

The franchise debut on May 26, 2001, in a home match against league giants Toronto Olympians, witch concluded in a 3–0 loss. The Dynamites recovered from their loss with a seven league game undefeated streak to help sustain a postseason berth. As their season progressed, the team ran into financial difficulties resulting in a decrease in player salaries, and the release of Jocelyn Roy, and Chris Stathopoulos the top two paid players. Despite the cutbacks Montreal managed to finish fourth in the overall standings, thus qualifying for the playoffs along with two of the other expansion clubs. In the playoffs the Dynamites faced St. Catharines Wolves, but were defeated by a score of 2–1 with the lone goal coming from Selaidopolous. At the CPSL Awards banquet Jankovic received the CPSL Coach of the Year award.

For the 2002 season Jankovic resigned from his position to coach ARS Laurentides, and Mohamed Hilen was appointed his successor. Hillen retained the majority of the original roster, but added Vladimir Edouard, and Paul Daccobert. Near the conclusion of the season Hilen announced his resignation as head coach to accept a technical director position for ARS Laval for a three-year term. He was replaced by general manager Victor Petkov, who previously coached the New Hampshire Ramblers.

Montreal would finish second in the Eastern Conference and secure a postseason berth. The club was eliminated early on in a wildcard match against the Metro Lions in a 3–1 defeat. In 2003, the organization moved to Laval, Quebec a suburb of Montreal and had a change of name to Laval Dynamites. The franchise brought in former Moroccan international Jawad El Andaloussi. Overall the season was a disappointment for Laval as they failed to qualify for the postseason for the first time in the club's history; missing the final playoff spot by one point. Laval took a one-year hiatus for the 2004 season as they awaited the completion of their home venue the Centre Sportif Bois-de-Boulogne.

On March 8, 2005, the CPSL announced the return of Laval Dynamites for the 2005 season. The team brought in Jean-Robert Toussaint as head coach, and signed Moroccan import Mohamed Ridouani and Nicolas Lesage. Toussaint led Laval to a playoff berth by finishing third in the Eastern Conference. Their opponents would end up being Toronto Croatia, where they were defeated by a score of 1–0. The following season the Dynamites announced the return of Jawad EL Andaloussi as head coach, and formed an affiliation agreement with Monteuil Soccer Club in order to develop players. He brought in Arturo Cisneros Salas, Andrew Olivieri, Hicham Aâboubou, Rachid Madkour, and brought back Abraham Francois. Jawad had a tremendous season finishing third in the National Division and making the postseason for the second year in a row. Unfortunately Laval would face Toronto Croatia once more in the quarterfinals and were defeated by a score of 1–0.

On November 26, 2006, Tony Ianitto announced a partnership with the Montreal Impact where Laval would serve as a farm team for the Impact, and resulted in the folding of the franchise and relocation to Trois-Rivières and the formation of the Trois-Rivières Attak.

== Final roster ==
Note: Flags indicate national team as defined under FIFA eligibility rules; some limited exceptions apply. Players may hold more than one non-FIFA nationality.

| No. | Pos. | Nation | Player |
|---|---|---|---|
| 0 | GK | CAN | Patrick Geffrard |
| 1 | GK | CAN | Andrew Olivieri |
| 2 | DF | MAR | Rachid Lahbabi |
| 3 | DF | CAN | Nick Rotiroti |
| 4 | DF | CAN | Abraham Francois |
| 5 | DF | MAR | Hicham Aaboubou |
| 6 | MF | SLV | Santos Soriano |
| 7 | MF | CAN | Sandro Addessa |
| 8 | MF | MAR | Mohamed Nafe |
| 9 | FW | CAN | Nasson Theosmy |
| 10 | MF | CAN | Leo Incollingo |
| 11 | MF | MAR | Mourad Bellari |
| 12 | MF | NGA | Gilbert IIoanusi |
| 13 | DF | MEX | Arturo C. Salas |
| 13 | FW | MEX | Josue Martinez Carranza |
| 14 | MF | MAR | Aziz Sirbane |

| No. | Pos. | Nation | Player |
|---|---|---|---|
| 16 | MF | CAN | Ceasar Castro |
| 17 | MF | CAN | Nicholas Knowland |
| 18 | MF | CHA | Lona Ouaidou |
| 19 | DF | CAN | Jean Phillipe Etienne |
| 20 | MF | PER | Daniel Hurtado |
| 21 | FW | CAN | IIias Calaitzidis |
| 22 | FW | CAN | Vladimir Edouard |
| 23 | DF | MAR | Ahmamad Abdelaziz |
| 24 | MF | CAN | Kyt Selaidopoulos |
| 25 | MF | CAN | Ammar Badawiem |
| 26 | DF | MAR | Berra Mohamed |
| 27 | FW | MAR | Rachid Madkour |
| 29 | GK | CAN | Joey Giannini |
| 34 | DF | CAN | Jean-Robert Merisier |
| 81 | GK | IRN | Hamed Mahmoudi |
| 76 | FW | MAR | Mohamed Ridouani |

== Head coaches ==
| Years | Name | Nation |
|---|---|---|
| 2001–2002 | Zoran Jankovic | Yugoslavia |
| 2002 | Mohamed Hilen | Morocco |
| 2002 | Victor Petkov | Canada |
| 2003 | Jawad El Andaloussi | Morocco |
| 2005 | Jean Robert Toussaint | Canada |
| 2006 | Jawad El Andaloussi | Morocco |

== Year-by-year ==
| Year | Division | League | Regular season | Playoffs |
|---|---|---|---|---|
| 2001 | 1 | CPSL | Fourth | Wild Card Round |
| 2002 | 1 - Eastern Conference | CPSL | Second | Semi-Finals |
| 2003 | 1 - Eastern Conference | CPSL | Fourth | Did not qualify |
| 2004 | / | / | on hiatus | / |
| 2005 | 1 - Eastern Conference | CPSL | Third | Semi-Finals |
| 2006 | 1 - National Division | CSL | Third | Quarter-Finals |
