= Russell Hutchison =

American soccer player

Personal information
- Full name: Russell Hutchison
- Date of birth: July 6, 1978 (age 48)
- Place of birth: Lynchburg, Virginia, United States
- Height: 6 ft 2 in (1.88 m)
- Position: Defender

College career
Years	Team	Apps	(Gls)
1996–2000	Maine Black Bears		

Senior career*
Years	Team	Apps	(Gls)
1998	Sioux City Breeze		
1999	Vermont Voltage		
2000	Minnesota Thunder		
2001	Connecticut Wolves	7	(0)
2002–2006	Virginia Beach Mariners	107	(5)
- * Club domestic league appearances and goals

Russell Hutchison (born July 6, 1978) is an American soccer player. He is a defender who played for American USL First Division side Virginia Beach Mariners from 2002 until their demise in 2006.

Hutchison was born in Lynchburg, Virginia and attended the University of Maine, playing on the men's soccer team from 1996 to 2000. In 1998, he played for the Sioux City Breeze during the collegiate off-season. In 1999, he similarly played for the Vermont Voltage. In 2000, he saw limited time with the Minnesota Thunder. In 2001, he played seven games for the Connecticut Wolves of the USL A-League. In 2002, Hutchinson moved to the Virginia Beach Mariners. He made 20 appearances for the Mariners in the 2005 season and scored one goal. The following campaign he played only 12 games before the Mariners were disbanded at the end of the season.

He graduated from the University of Maine in 2000.
