= Bart Farley =

American soccer player and coach

Personal information
- Full name: Stewart Bart Farley
- Place of birth: United States
- Position: Goalkeeper

Youth career
- 1976–1979: Vermont Catamounts

Senior career*
Years	Team	Apps	(Gls)
1979–1980	Detroit Lightning (indoor)	8	(0)
1980	Detroit Express	0	(0)
1980–1981	Detroit Express (indoor)	6	(0)
1981	New England Sharks		
1997	Vermont Voltage		

Managerial career
- Vermont Catamounts (assistant)
- * Club domestic league appearances and goals

Stewart Bart Farley is an American retired soccer goalkeeper who played professionally in the North American Soccer League and Major Indoor Soccer League.

A native of Williston, Vermont, Farley attended Williston Central School, Champlain Valley Union High School, and the University of Vermont where he was a 1978 Honorable Mention (third team) All American soccer player. He is a member of the Vermont Catamounts Hall of Fame. In 1979, he signed with the Detroit Lightning of the Major Indoor Soccer League. In 1980, he moved to the Detroit Express of the North American Soccer League. He also served as an assistant coach with the University of Virginia. He currently works for the Las Vegas Premier Soccer Club.

In December 1999, Sports Illustrated named him as one of the top 50 Vermont athletes.
