= Khalil Azmi =

Moroccan footballer

Personal information
- Date of birth: August 23, 1964 (age 62)
- Place of birth: Casablanca, Morocco
- Height: 6 ft 0 in (1.83 m)
- Position: Goalkeeper

Senior career*
Years	Team	Apps	(Gls)
1984–1992	Wydad Casablanca		
1992–1994	Raja Casablanca		
1995	New Hampshire Ramblers		
1996	New York Fever		
1997	Charleston Battery	27	(0)
1997–1999	Baltimore Spirit/Blast (indoor)	60	(0)
1998	Hershey Wildcats	23	(0)

International career
1987–1994	Morocco	26	(0)
- * Club domestic league appearances and goals

Khalil Azmi (born 23 August 1964) is a Moroccan former footballer who played as a goalkeeper. He played ten seasons in the Moroccan League, two in the USISL, two in the National Professional Soccer League, and one in the A-League.

== Career ==
In 1984, Azmi began his career with Wydad Casablanca in the Moroccan League. In 1992, he moved to Raja Casablanca. In 1995, he moved to the United States where he played for the New Hampshire Ramblers in the USISL. In February 1996, the Colorado Rapids selected him in the 14th round (132nd overall) of the 1996 MLS Inaugural Player Draft. He never played for the Rapids, instead playing with the New York Fever in the A-League in 1996. In 1997, he played for the Charleston Battery in the USISL. That fall, he signed with the Baltimore Spirit of the National Professional Soccer League. He spent two winter indoor seasons with the Spirit. In 1998, he played for the Hershey Wildcats in the USISL.
