= Gavin MacLeod (football) =

Scottish football manager (born 1983)

Personal information
- Full name: Gavin Murray MacLeod
- Date of birth: 8 August 1983 (age 43)
- Place of birth: Kirkcaldy, Scotland
- Position: Defender

Team information
- Current team: Dayton Dutch Lions WFC

Senior career*
Years	Team	Apps	(Gls)
1999-2006	East Kilbride Amateurs		
2007	Vermont Voltage		
2009	Cincinnati Kings		

Managerial career
- 2012: Cincinnati Kings (assistant coach)
- 2013: Cincinnati Saints
- 2014: Dayton Dutch Lions WFC
- 2017–: University of Cincinnati
- * Club domestic league appearances and goals

Gavin Murray MacLeod (born 8 August 1983) is a Scottish football manager who is the assistant coach and director of player performance for the University of Cincinnati women's soccer team, as part of the American Athletic Conference.

== Playing career ==
As a player, MacLeod played four years at Lincoln Memorial University and also played for the Vermont Voltage and Cincinnati Kings in the USL Premier Development League.

== Managerial career ==
After finishing his playing career, he earned his master's degree in Sports Nutrition and Exercise Science from Leeds Beckett University, and earned his UEFA licence and NSCAA Premier Diploma, with over five years of coaching at all levels of the game.

His first coaching position in the USA came as the assistant coach with the Cincinnati Kings during the 2012 USL Premier Development League season. MacLeod helped lead the team to a fourth-place finish in the Great Lakes Division, missing a playoff berth by just two point.

In 2013 after the dissolution of the Kings PDL franchise, he was named as the head coach for the Cincinnati Saints. With MacLeod in charge, the Saints won the 2013 Midwest Regional League and were semi-finalists in the 2013 USASA Regional Tournament. Towards the end of 2013, the Cincinnati Saints announced plans to move into the National Premier Soccer League for the 2014 season.

In February 2014 it was announced that he had accepted the position as head coach of the Dayton Dutch Lions W-League team for the upcoming season. The Dutch Lions announced on 25 February 2015 that MacLeod would be returning for the 2015 W-League.
