= Max Touloute =

Haitian footballer (born 1990)

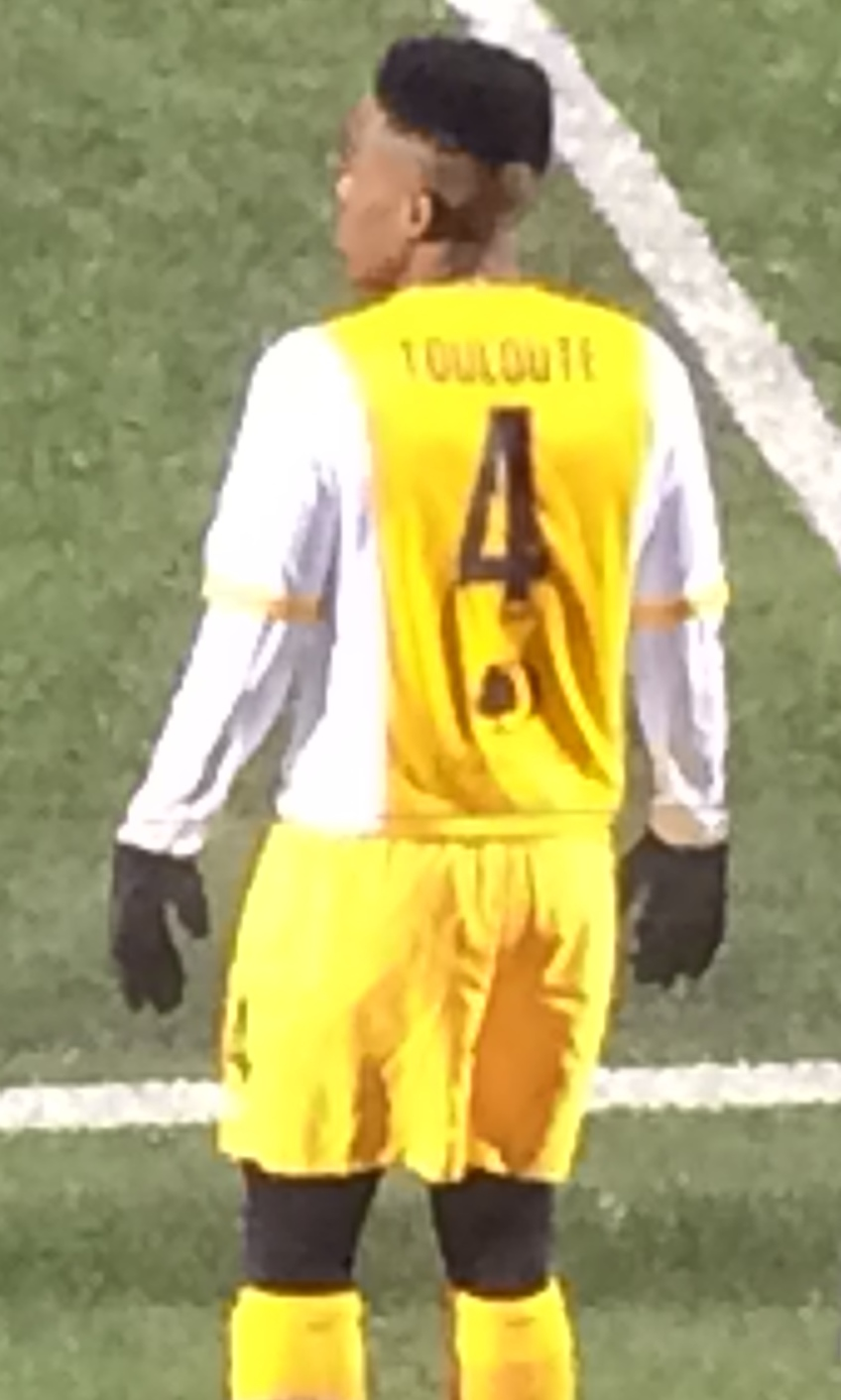
- Touloute coming on for Riverhounds debut

Personal information
- Full name: Max Paul Touloute
- Date of birth: 27 April 1990 (age 36)
- Place of birth: Les Cayes, Haiti
- Height: 1.78 m (5 ft 10 in)
- Position: Forward

College career
Years	Team	Apps	(Gls)
2008–2011	IPFW Mastodons		

Senior career*
Years	Team	Apps	(Gls)
2010	Michigan Bucks	7	(1)
2011	Vermont Voltage	7	(0)
2012	Tindastóll	17	(6)
2013	BÍ/Bolungarvík	15	(5)
2014	Reading United	5	(1)
2014	Pennsylvania Roar (indoor)	5	(7)
2014–2016	Missouri Comets (indoor)	31	(43)
2015	Pittsburgh Riverhounds	11	(1)
2016–2018	San Diego Sockers (indoor)	30	(18)
2018–2019	Florida Tropics (indoor)	16	(5)
- * Club domestic league appearances and goals as of 22 October 2019

Max Touloute (born 27 April 1990) is a Haitian footballer who last played for Florida Tropics SC in the Major Arena Soccer League.

== Career ==
=== College and semi-professional ===
Touloute played college soccer for the Fort Wayne Mastodons of Indiana University – Purdue University Fort Wayne for four seasons between 2008 and 2011. In total, Touloute made 67 appearances, tallying 32 goals and 14 assists for the team. Touloute earned multiple honours throughout his college career, including being named Summit League Offensive Player of the Year in 2011. While in college, Touloute also played semi-professional soccer for Premier Development League clubs Michigan Bucks in 2010 and Vermont Voltage in 2011. He made seven league appearances for both clubs, scoring one goal for Michigan.

=== Professional ===
Following college, Touloute signed for UMF Tindastóll of the 1. deild karla, the second tier of the Icelandic football league system, on 1 May 2012. In his one season with the club, Touloute tallied 6 goals in 17 matches. The player also made two Icelandic Cup appearances for the club, scoring one goal, during the season. Toulouse left the club on 5 September of the same year. The following season, he transferred to BÍ/Bolungarvík, also of the 1. deild karla, signing on 14 March 2013. He remained with this club for one season also, scoring 5 goals in 15 matches.

Touloute returned to the United States in 2014, signing for Reading United and returning to the Premier Development League in the process. Throughout the 2014 season, Touloute made 5 appearances and scored 1 goal. Following his departure from Reading, it was announced on 13 March 2015 that Touloute had signed with the Pittsburgh Riverhounds of the United Soccer League for the 2015 season. He made his league debut for the club on 28 March 2015, coming on as a second-half substitute for Lebogang Moloto in the eventual 5–2 victory over the Harrisburg City Islanders to open the season. Touloute scored his first goal for the club on the next matchday, scoring Pittsburgh's only goal of a 1–2 defeat to the Rochester Rhinos on 4 April 2015.

=== International ===
Touloute was called up by the Haitian national team for a 2012 Caribbean Cup qualification match against Guyana on 14 November 2012. Touloute was on the bench for the match but was an unused substitute. For the other two qualification matches of the round, Touloute was left off of the gameday roster and remained in the stands. Haiti head coach Israel Blake Cantero called Touloute into the squad for the final round of the 2012 Caribbean Cup after the nation qualified but the player had to remain in the United States to finish exams to graduate from his university. He has not yet been capped by Haiti.
