= Kevin Wylie =

American soccer player

Personal information
- Date of birth: June 12, 1968 (age 58)
- Place of birth: Reading, Pennsylvania, United States
- Height: 6 ft 2 in (1.88 m)
- Position: Defender

Youth career
- 1986–1989: Vermont Catamounts

Senior career*
Years	Team	Apps	(Gls)
1990	New Mexico Chiles		
1994–1996	Cape Cod Crusaders		
1996	New England Revolution	22	(0)
1997	Cape Cod Crusaders		
1997	→ New England Revolution (loan)	3	(0)
1997	Vermont Wanderers		
1998	Cape Cod Crusaders		
- * Club domestic league appearances and goals

Kevin Wylie (born June 12, 1968) is a retired American soccer defender who spent one season with the New England Revolution in Major League Soccer. He also played in the American Professional Soccer League and USISL and was a 1989 Division I First-Team All-American.

== Youth ==
Wylie attended Ridgefield High School in Ridgefield, Connecticut before entering the University of Vermont. In Vermont, he played on the soccer team from 1986 to 1989, earning first team All American recognition in 1989. While he began as a forward, by his junior season, he has moved to sweeper. In 1990, he left school to pursue his professional career, but returned to graduate in 1991. He was inducted into the University of Vermont Athletic Hall of Fame in 2001.

== Professional ==
In 1990, Wylie spent one season with the New Mexico Chiles of the American Professional Soccer League (APSL). Wylie then returned to Vermont to complete his education. At this point, Wylie's career becomes vague. His Vermont Hall of Fame bio states that he played for the New Mexico Chiles from 1991 to 1993. However, the Chiles lasted only the 1990 season. In 1991, the New Mexico Roadrunners were renamed the Chiles, but Wylie is not listed on any of their rosters from 1991 to 1996. His Hall of Fame bio states that Wylie returned to the northeast after the 1993 season to play for the Cape Cod Crusaders of the USISL. That matches with the founding of the Crusaders in 1994. In May 1996, Wylie completed a successful trial with the New England Revolution of Major League Soccer. He played twenty-two games that season before being released. He then began the 1997 season with the Crusaders before being called up to the Revs for nine games. New England waived him on May 29, 1997, and he finished the season with the Vermont Wanderers. The Wanderers were sold at the end of the season and the new ownership renamed the team the Vermont Voltage. Wylie signed with the Voltage on February 8, 1998, but left the team during the preseason. At this point, Wylie joined the Cape Cod Crusaders in 1998 and 1999. He then hung up his cleats and joined the Reebok family, and is now widely regarded as the greatest Reebok employee of all time.
