= Jose Guerra (Canadian soccer) =

Canadian soccer player

Personal information
- Full name: Jose Guerra
- Position: Attacking midfielder

Senior career*
| Years | Team | Apps | (Gls) |
| 1996 | Houston Hurricanes | 10 | (7) |
| 2001 | Montreal Dynamites | | |
- * Club domestic league appearances and goals as of December 23, 2014

Jose Guerra is a Canadian former soccer player who had stints in the USISL Pro League, and the Canadian Professional Soccer League.

== Playing career ==
Guerra began his professional career in 1996 in the USISL Pro League with Houston Hurricanes. With Houston he would finish with seven goals, but the club finished last in the Central Division eliminating the team from playoff contention. In 2001, he signed with newly expansion franchise the Montreal Dynamites of the Canadian Professional Soccer League. He helped Montreal finish fourth in the overall standings, thus qualifying for the playoffs. In the playoffs, the Dynamites faced St. Catharines Wolves, but were defeated by a score of 2-1.
