= Piotr Libicz =

Polish-born Canadian soccer player

Personal information
- Full name: Piotr Libicz
- Place of birth: Poland
- Position: Goalkeeper

Senior career*
Years	Team	Apps	(Gls)
1996–1997	Toronto Shooting Stars (indoor)	7	(0)
1997	Toronto Supra	7	(0)
1998	Toronto Croatia	1	(0)
2000	North York Astros	13	(0)
2002	York Region Shooters	18	(0)
- * Club domestic league appearances and goals

Piotr Libicz is a former Canadian soccer player who featured in the National Professional Soccer League, Canadian National Soccer League, and the Canadian Professional Soccer League.

== Playing career ==
Libicz began his career in the Canadian National Soccer League with Toronto Supra in 1997. During the season he helped Supra reach the postseason, and featured in the semi-finals against Toronto Croatia, and won the series by a score of 8-1 on goals on aggregate. He played in the championship finals against St. Catharines Wolves, but Toronto lost the match to a score of 4-3. During the winter of 1996 he signed with the Toronto Shooting Stars of the National Professional Soccer League, he made seven appearances for the club. Libicz was transferred to Toronto Croatia for the inaugural season of the Canadian Professional Soccer League. He made his debut for the club on September 23, 1998 in a match against St. Catharines Wolves.

In 2000, Libicz signed with the North York Astros of the Canadian Professional Soccer League. He made his debut for the club on June 4, 2000 in a match against Toronto Croatia. At the conclusion of the season he was awarded the CPSL Goalkeeper of the Year. In 2002, he signed with York Region Shooters, and made his debut on May 24, 2002 in a match against the Mississauga Olympians. He helped the Shooters finish fourth in the Eastern Conference, but fell short of securing a postseason berth.
