= Paul Daccobert =

Canadian former soccer player

Personal information
- Place of birth: Montreal, Quebec, Canada
- Position: Midfielder

Senior career*
Years	Team	Apps	(Gls)
1995	New Hampshire Ramblers		
1998	Vermont Voltage	10	(2)
2002–2003	Montreal Dynamites	22	(4)
2004	Brampton Hitmen	16	(8)
2005	Oakville Blue Devils	5	(1)
- * Club domestic league appearances and goals

Paul Daccobert is a Canadian former soccer player who had stints in the USISL Pro League, and the Canadian Professional Soccer League.

== Playing career ==
Daccobert began his career in 1995 with the New Hampshire Ramblers in the USISL Pro League. In 1998, he signed with the Vermont Voltage, where he recorded two goals. In 2002, he was signed by the Montreal Dynamites of the Canadian Professional Soccer League. During his time with Montreal he helped the team to qualify for the postseason by finishing second in the Eastern Conference. In 2004, Daccobert signed with the Brampton Hitmen, and made his debut on June 25, 2004 in a match against Durham Storm in a 2-1 victory. He scored his first goal for the organization at the August 2, 2004 match against London City.

He finished as the club's top goalscorer with eight goals, and assisted in clinching a playoff berth by finishing fourth in the Western Conference. The following season he signed with expansion franchise the Oakville Blue Devils . During the 2005 season he helped Oakville finish second in the Western Conference, and win his first CPSL Championship by defeating Vaughan Shooters by a score of 2-1.

== Honors ==
=== Oakville Blue Devils ===
- CPSL Championship (1): 2005
