= Philippe-Andre Moreau =

Canadian former soccer player (born 1970)

Personal information
- Date of birth: July 9, 1970 (age 56)
- Place of birth: Anjou, Quebec
- Position: Midfielder

Senior career*
Years	Team	Apps	(Gls)
1997–1998	Albany Alleycats	20	(0)
1999–2000	Seacoast United Phantoms		
2001	Montreal Dynamites		
- * Club domestic league appearances and goals

Philippe-Andre Moreau (born July 9, 1970) is a Canadian former soccer player who played in the USL D-3 Pro League, and the Canadian Professional Soccer League.

== Playing career ==
Moreau began his professional career in the USL D-3 Pro League in 1997 with Albany Alleycats. His tenure with Albany lasted for two seasons, where in both seasons the club failed to reach a postseason berth. With Aibany he was named the MVP for the 1998 season and was named player of the week on four occasions. In 1999, he signed a contract with the Seacoast United Phantoms. With the Phantoms he helped the organization reach the final of the national championship, and clinch the Northern division title. In 2001, he signed with the Montreal Dynamites in the Canadian Professional Soccer League.
