= Chris Stathopoulos =

Canadian former soccer player (born 1977)

Personal information
- Date of birth: December 29, 1977 (age 48)
- Place of birth: Montreal, Quebec
- Height: 1.75 m (5 ft 9 in)
- Position: Striker

Senior career*
Years	Team	Apps	(Gls)
1997–2000	Montreal Impact	31	(0)
1997–2000	Montreal Impact (indoor)	56	(58)
1997–1998	Milwaukee Wave (indoor)	4	(1)
2000–2001	Toronto ThunderHawks (indoor)	37	(40)
2001	Montreal Dynamites	5	(1)
- * Club domestic league appearances and goals

Chris Stathopoulos (born December 29, 1977) is a Canadian former soccer player who played in the USL A-League, National Professional Soccer League, and the Canadian Professional Soccer League.

== Playing career ==
Stathopoulos began his professional career with Montreal Impact in the USL A-League in 1997. During the 1997 season he helped Montreal clinch the Northeast division title, and reach the Division finals where the Long Island Rough Riders defeated them from playoff contention. He also played with Montreal during the indoor season in the National Professional Soccer League. His best season was during the 1999 indoor season where he recorded 42 goals in 43 matches. He finished as the second highest goalscorer for the club that season. He had a stint with Milwaukee Wave in 1997, and won the NPSL Championship with the organization. Stathopoulos next stint at the indoor level was in 2000 this time with the Toronto ThunderHawks. During his tenure with Toronto he finished as the club's second all-time highest goalscorer.

On May 16, 2001, the Montreal Dynamites of the Canadian Professional Soccer League announced the signing of Stathopoulos to a contract. Near the conclusion of the season the organization faced financial difficulties, which resulted in the release of Stathopoulos from his contract after rejecting a pay cut to his salary.
