= Josie Valeri =

American soccer player (born 2001)

Personal information
- Full name: Josephine Elizabeth Valeri
- Date of birth: June 17, 2001 (age 25)
- Place of birth: Pittsburgh, Pennsylvania, USA
- Height: 1.63 m (5 ft 4 in)
- Positions: Full back; center back

Team information
- Current team: A.P.G.M.S. Kalloni
- Number: 5

Youth career
- 2008–2024: Riverhounds Development Academy
- 2013–2014: PA Crew Soccer Academy
- 2014–2016: Stars United
- 2018–2019: Century United

College career
Years	Team	Apps	(Gls)
2019–2024	Point Park University	50	(1)

Senior career*
Years	Team	Apps	(Gls)
2021–2023	Pittsburgh Hotspurs	17	(0)
2023–2024	St. Catharines Roma Wolves	16	(0)
2024–2025	AE Mykonos	15	(0)
2026	Veria NFC	10	(0)
2026–	A.P.G.M.S. Kalloni		
- * Club domestic league appearances and goals

Josephine Elizabeth Valeri (born June 17, 2001) is an American professional soccer player and critical psychologist who plays as a full back and center back for A.P.G.M.S. Kalloni.

== Early Life and Education ==
At age three, Valeri began playing soccer at the YMCA.

She also joined the Riverhounds Development Academy (RDA) at age seven and played through Seneca Valley School District. She participated in recreational soccer for SV North from ages four to six before playing on the highschool soccer and lacrosse teams as a freshman at age 14.

Alongside indoor, outdoor, and futsal on all-boys and all-girls recreational teams, Valeri played across PA Crew Soccer Club, Stars United SC, the Olympic Development Program, and Elite Clubs National League with the RDA from ages 12 to 16.

Valeri graduated in 2019 through Pennsylvania Cyber Charter School; she simultaneously took community college courses while continuing to play soccer. She committed to Point Park University (PPU) while playing with Century United.

Beginning her studies in 2019, Valeri earned a Bachelor of Arts in Applied psychology in 2022, a Master of Arts in clinical-community psychology in 2023, and a Doctor of Philosophy in Critical psychology in 2025.

== Playing Career ==
=== University ===
Playing college soccer for PPU for five years, she made 50 appearances. She scored one collegiate goal against Carlow University in River States Conference (RSC) play. Valeri earned Defensive Player of the Week in October 2022. She was also named to the RSC Women's Soccer Scholar-Athlete Team from 2021–2023.

During Valeri's time as a student-athlete, the women's soccer team shared the RSC regular-season title in 2021. The program also earned the conference's top tournament seed in three consecutive seasons.

=== Amateur ===
Valeri played across the pro-am leagues of WPSL and UWS for the Pittsburgh Hotspurs from 2021–23.

She also played semi-professionally with the St. Catharines Roma Wolves women's team in League1 Ontario, appearing in 16 matches for the 2023–24 season.

She also competed with the Pittsburgh Riverhounds SC USL Academy in 2024.

=== Professional ===
Valeri began her professional career in the 2^{nd} National Women's Football Division of the Greek Football League system, and signed with A.E. Mykonos in 2024. In 2026, Valeri transferred to the women's team of Veria NFC in Veria, Central Macedonia, Greece. Ahead of the 2026–27 season, Valeri became an official member of A.P.G.M.S. Kalloni in Kalloni, Lesvos. Sto Nisi reported her transfer and noted she earned her PhD from ages 23 to 24. In the 2026–27 Greek Women's Cup, she scored in the 93rd minute of a knockout match.

== Research ==
Her dissertation, “The Potential Value of Humor During Cross-Cultural Adjustment,” was made available by ProQuest in May 2025. She published "The Infrapersonal: Intersubjectivity in the Digital Age" the same year in The Humanistic Psychologist, a journal in APA Division 32.

== Personal Life ==
Valeri is daughter of Kristen and Carlo Valeri, Granddaughter of Kathy and Ken Burr, and sister to Maeve Valeri.
