= José Guerra (footballer, born 1994) =

Panamanian footballer

Personal information
- Full name: José Carlos Guerra
- Date of birth: 12 September 1994 (age 32)
- Place of birth: David, Panama
- Height: 1.84 m (6 ft 0 in)
- Position: Goalkeeper

Team information
- Current team: CAI
- Number: 12

Senior career*
Years	Team	Apps	(Gls)
2014–2016	Atlético Chiriquí	2	(0)
2016–2017	Tauro	0	(0)
2017–2019	Santa Gema	45	(0)
2019–	CAI	44	(0)

International career^{‡}
2020–	Panama	4	(0)
- * Club domestic league appearances and goals as of 12 January 2021 ‡ National team caps and goals as of 23 March 2023

José Carlos Guerra (born 12 September 1994) is a Panamanian football player who plays as goalkeeper for CAI and the Panama national team.

== International career ==
Guerra made his debut for the Panama national team in a 0–0 friendly draw with Nicaragua on 26 February 2020.
