= Vermont Voltage =

- Full name: Vermont Voltage Soccer Club
- Nicknames: The Volts, The Amps, Crno-beli
- Founded: 1997
- Dissolved: 2014
- Ground: Collins-Perley Sports Complex; St. Albans, Vermont
- Capacity: 2,000
- Owner: Bojan Vučković
- Head Coach: Hugh Brown
- League: USL Premier Development League
- 2014: 8th, Northeast; Playoffs: DNQ
- Website: http://voltagesportsclub.com
Home colors	Away colors

Previous Voltage logo until 2008

Vermont Voltage was an American soccer team based in St. Albans, Vermont, United States. Founded in 1997, the team played in the USL Premier Development League (PDL), the fourth tier of the American Soccer Pyramid, in the Northeast Division of the Eastern Conference, having spent the 2009 season on hiatus. The Voltage folded after the 2014 season.

The team played its home games at the Collins-Perley Sports Complex. The team's colors were yellow, blue and black.

== History ==
Founded as the Vermont Wanderers in 1997, the team played in the USL Second Division from 1997 to 1998 before moving to the Premier Development League, where it would compete from 1999 to 2014, with a one-year hiatus in 2009. The club played its first game on April 12, 1997, a 0–3 defeat to the New Hampshire Phantoms. The team would reach the playoffs three times in its history, advancing to the conference finals in 2003.

The club also had a sister organization, Vermont Lady Voltage, who played in the USL W-League. Due to stadium renovations, the Lady Voltage folded in 2009.

The Voltage folded in 2014. In 2022 a new USL League Two side, Vermont Green FC was founded.

== Year-by-year ==
Year	Division	League	Reg. season	Playoffs	Open Cup
1997	3	USISL D-3 Pro League	5th, Northeast	Did not qualify	Did not qualify
1998	3	USISL D-3 Pro League	5th, Northeast	Did not qualify	Did not qualify
1999	4	USL PDL	5th, Northeast	Did not qualify	Did not qualify
2000	4	USL PDL	2nd, Northeast	Conference semifinals	Did not qualify
2001	4	USL PDL	3rd, Northeast	Did not qualify	Did not qualify
2002	4	USL PDL	1st, Northeast	Conference semifinals	Did not qualify
2003	4	USL PDL	1st, Northeast	Conference finals	Did not qualify
2004	4	USL PDL	8th, Northeast	Did not qualify	Did not qualify
2005	4	USL PDL	5th, Northeast	Did not qualify	Did not qualify
2006	4	USL PDL	5th, New England	Did not qualify	Did not qualify
2007	4	USL PDL	6th, Northeast	Did not qualify	Did not qualify
2008	4	USL PDL	3rd, New England	Did not qualify	Did not qualify
2009	On Hiatus				
2010	4	USL PDL	5th, Northeast	Did not qualify	Did not qualify
2011	4	USL PDL	5th, Northeast	Did not qualify	Did not qualify
2012	4	USL PDL	7th, Northeast	Did not qualify	Did not qualify
2013	4	USL PDL	3rd, Northeast	Did not qualify	Did not qualify
2014	4	USL PDL	8th, Northeast	Did not qualify	First Round

== Honors ==
- USL PDL Northeast Division Champions 2002
- USL PDL Northeast Division Champions 2003

== Notable former players ==
This list of notable former players comprises players who went on to play professional soccer after playing for the team in the Premier Development League, or those who previously played professionally before joining the team.

- (Serbia) Stefan Antonijevic
- (Haiti) Roldege Arius
- (Puerto Rico) Terry Boss
- (Serbia) Tomislav Čolić
- (Canada) Paul Daccobert
- (Haiti) Vladimir Edouard
- (United States) Bart Farley
- (United States) Mitch Garcia
- (Trinidad and Tobago) Jonathan Glenn
- (United States) Matheau Hall
- (Croatia) Goran Hunjak
- (United States) Russell Hutchison
- (Canada) Leo Incollingo
- (England) Adam Kay
- (Serbia) Darko Kolić
- (United States) Leonard Krupnik
- (Trinidad and Tobago) Yohance Marshall
- (Scotland) Gavin MacLeod
- (Canada) Olivier Occéan
- (Ivory Coast) Arsène Oka
- (Canada) Andrew Olivieri
- (Brazil) Sullivan Silva
- (Canada) Kyt Selaidopoulos
- (Haiti) Max Touloute
- (United States) Kevin Wylie

== Head coaches ==
- (Serbia) Bo Vučković (2000–2014)
- (Serbia) Bo Simić (2007–2008 and 2010)

== Stadiums ==
- Collins-Perley Sports Complex, St. Albans, Vermont (2003–present)
- Stadium at Essex High School, Essex Junction, Vermont 2 games (2005)
- Stadium at Lyndon State College, Lyndon, Vermont 1 game (2011)

== Average attendance ==
Attendance stats are calculated by averaging each team's self-reported home attendances from the historical match archive at and at Kenn.com https://kenn.com/blog/soccer/all-time-usl-league-two-attendance/, https://kenn.com/blog/soccer/all-time-usl-third-division-attendance/

- 1997: 407 (30th in D3 Pro League)
- 1998: 336 (25th in D3 Pro League)
- 1999: 300 (15th in PDL)
- 2000: 466 (7th in PDL)
- 2001: 485 (8th in PDL)
- 2002: 952 (7th in PDL) Playoffs: 1,674 Overall: 1,024
- 2003: 942 (5th in PDL) Playoffs: 1,567 Overall: 1,055
- 2004: 692 (8th in PDL)
- 2005: 828 (7th in PDL)
- 2006: 495 (13th in PDL)
- 2007: 631 (12th in PDL)
- 2008: 692 (15th in PDL)
- 2009: Did not play
- 2010: 529 (22nd in PDL)
- 2011: 503 (22nd in PDL)
- 2012: 454 (22nd in PDL)
- 2013: 206 (36th in PDL)
- 2014: 301 (30th in PDL)
