= Andrew McKay (soccer) =

Scottish-American soccer player

Personal information
- Full name: Andrew T. McKay
- Place of birth: Scotland
- Positions: Forward; midfielder

Youth career
- 1983, 1985–1986: Catawba College

Senior career*
Years	Team	Apps	(Gls)
1990	Orlando Lions		
1991–1993	Fort Lauderdale Strikers	42	(8)
1994–1998	Buffalo Blizzard (indoor)		
1996–1998	Rochester Rhinos	70	(2)
2000–2001	St. Catharines Wolves		
- * Club domestic league appearances and goals

Andrew "Yogi" McKay is a retired Scottish American association football (soccer) player who played professionally in the United States.

McKay graduated from Arcadia High School in Greece, New York. He attended Catawba College, playing on the school's soccer team in 1983, 1985 and 1986. He holds numerous school records including goals scored in a game, all time season and career assists leader. McKay played for Greece Soccer Club Rangers and Team Lapine, both are amateur teams. In 1990, he turned professional with the Orlando Lions of the American Professional Soccer League. When the Lions merged with the Fort Lauderdale Strikers in 1991, McKay was the only Lions player to remain with the team for the 1991 season. In 1994, McKay moved indoors with the Buffalo Blizzard of the National Professional Soccer League. From 1996 to 1998, he played for the Rochester Rhinos in the USISL A-League. In 2000, he signed with St. Catharines Wolves of the Canadian Professional Soccer League. In the 2001 season he won the CPSL Championship by defeating Toronto Supra by a score of 1–0.
