= Arturo Cisneros =

Mexican footballer (born 1978)

Personal information
- Full name: Arturo Enrique Cisneros Bejar
- Date of birth: 28 November 1978 (age 47)
- Place of birth: Guerreros Acapulco, Mexico
- Height: 1.71 m (5 ft 7 in)

Senior career*
Years	Team	Apps	(Gls)
1997–2001	Guerreros Acapulco		
2002	Montreal Dynamites		
2003	Tien Giang		
2004	Ho Chi Minh City FC		
2005	Atlante		
2006	Laval Dynamites		
- * Club domestic league appearances and goals

Arturo Enrique Cisneros Bejar (born 28 November 1978) is a Mexican former professional footballer who played as a defender or midfielder. He had stints in the V-League, Ascenso MX, and the Canadian Soccer League.

== Career ==
Cisneros began his career in his native city with Guerreros Acapulco, where he played for five years, and served as the team's captain. In 2002, he went abroad to Canada to sign with the Montreal Dynamites of the Canadian Professional Soccer League. During his tenure with Montreal he helped the club finish second in the Eastern Conference, and reached the semi-finals in the playoffs. In 2003, Cisneros went overseas to Asia to sign with Tien Giang, and the following year he signed with Ho Chi Minh City F.C. In 2005, he signed with Atlante of the Ascenso MX. On 26 March 2006, he returned to Canada to sign with the Laval Dynamites for the 2006 CSL season. He helped Laval finish third in the National Division, and featured in the quarterfinal match against Toronto Croatia, which resulted in a 1–0 victory for Toronto.
