= Frank Cardona =

Canadian former soccer player

Personal information
- Full name: Frank Cardona
- Date of birth: June 18, 1971 (age 55)
- Place of birth: Canada
- Position: Midfielder

College career
Years	Team	Apps	(Gls)
1990–1992	Centennial Colts		

Senior career*
Years	Team	Apps	(Gls)
1991–1993	Toronto Blizzard	14	(3)
1994	Toronto Rockets	12	(2)
1996–1997	Toronto Supra		
1996–1997	Toronto Shooting Stars (indoor)	21	(8)
2004–2005	Toronto Supra		
- * Club domestic league appearances and goals

Frank Cardona (born June 18, 1971) is a Canadian former soccer player, and currently a head coach with Hamilton United Elite.

== Playing career ==
Cardona played at the college level with Centennial College, where he was named the Male Athlete of the Year twice in the 1990-1991, and 1991-1992 seasons and All Canadian OCAA Starting 11 In 1991. He began his professional career in 1991 with Toronto Blizzard in the Canadian Soccer League and American Professional Soccer League. In 1994, he signed with the Toronto Rockets of the American Professional Soccer League, and made his debut on July 15, 1994 in a match against Montreal Impact coming on as a substitute for Gino DiFlorio. In 1996, he signed with Toronto Supra in the Canadian National Soccer League. During the 1996 winter season he signed with Toronto Shooting Stars of the National Professional Soccer League.

After a sabbatical he returned to Toronto Supra to compete in the Canadian Professional Soccer League in 2004, and assisted in securing the Eastern Conference title.

== Managerial career ==
In 2009, he served in the marketing and public relations department for Portugal FC in the Canadian Soccer League. In 2011, he was appointed the director of soccer operations for SC Toronto Pro. He later became involved with Hamilton United Elite as a head coach for the U17/U21 girls team.

== Honors ==
Toronto Supra

- Canadian Professional Soccer League Eastern Conference (1): 2004
