= Gary Hughes (soccer) =

Canadian soccer player

Personal information
- Full name: Gary Hughes
- Place of birth: Canada
- Position: Defender

Youth career
- 1995: Brown Bears

Senior career*
Years	Team	Apps	(Gls)
1996	South Carolina Shamrocks	5	(1)
1997	St. Catharines Wolves		
2000–2001	St. Catharines Wolves		
- * Club domestic league appearances and goals

Gary Hughes is a Canadian former soccer player who played in the USISL Select League, and the Canadian Professional Soccer League.

== Playing career ==
Hughes played college soccer with Brown University, and was named the Ivy League Player of the Year in 1995. In 1996, he played professional in the USISL Select League with South Carolina Shamrocks. After a season abroad he signed with St. Catharines Wolves in the Canadian National Soccer League. In his debut season with St. Catharines he won the regular season championship, and the CNSL Championship. In the championship final match the club faced Toronto Supra, and won the series by a score of 4-3.

Hughes returned to St. Catharines in 2000, when the organization competed in the CNSL successor league the Canadian Professional Soccer League. During the 2001 season he was selected for the CPSL All-Star squad against Morocco U-23. For the remainder of the season he assisted the Wolves in capturing the CPSL Championship by defeating Toronto Supra by a score 1-0. The following season, he retired from professional soccer.

== Honors ==
=== St. Catharines Roma Wolves ===
- CNSL Championship (1): 1996
- CPSL Championship (1): 2001
