= Lucio Ianiero =

Canadian soccer player and coach (born 1966)

Personal information
- Date of birth: 13 December 1966 (age 59)
- Place of birth: Toronto, Ontario, Canada
- Position: Midfielder

Team information
- Current team: Niagara 1812 (head coach)

Senior career*
Years	Team	Apps	(Gls)
1987–1991	Hamilton Steelers	115	(14)
1992	London Lasers	16	(1)
1993	Toronto Blizzard	23	(0)
1994	Toronto Rockets	7	(1)
1995–2006	St. Catharines Wolves		
1996–1997	Toronto Shooting Stars (indoor)	17	(5)

International career
1986–1992	Canada	17	(0)

Managerial career
- 1999–2004: St. Catharines Wolves
- 2015–2019: Brock Badgers
- 2024–: Niagara 1812
- * Club domestic league appearances and goals

Lucio Ianiero (born 13 December 1966) is a Canadian soccer coach and former player who is the head coach of Niagara 1812.

He played in the Canadian Soccer League, American Professional Soccer League, Canadian National Soccer League, National Professional Soccer League, and the Canadian Professional Soccer League.

== Club career ==
Ianiero played for the Hamilton Steelers in the original Canadian Soccer League and was the league's 12th best scorer in 1988 with 9 goals. In 1992, he joined the London Lasers. After the demise of the CSL he played in the American Professional Soccer League for the Toronto Blizzard in 1993, and featured in 23 matches. When the Blizzards folded he signed with Toronto Rockets in 1994, and featured in seven matches and recorded one goal.

He also played indoor soccer for the Toronto Shooting Stars of the National Professional Soccer League, where he appeared in 17 matches and recorded five goals.

== International career ==
Ianiero participated in the 1985 FIFA World Youth Championship and the inaugural 1989 Futsal World Cup in the Netherlands. He made his senior debut for Canada in an August 1986 Merlion Cup match against Singapore and went on to earn 17 caps.

== Coaching career ==
Ianiero served as an assistant coach for St. Catharines Roma Wolves in 1997. In 2000, he was named Canadian Professional Soccer League Coach of the Year, as head coach of the St. Catharines Wolves. In 2001, he helped lead the Wolves to the league title. He was the team's player-coach from at least 2000 to 2006. On 12 August 2015 Brock University appointed Ianiero head coach for the men's soccer team.

In 2024, he was named the head coach of Niagara 1812 for both the men's team in the National Premier Soccer League and the women's team in the Women's Premier Soccer League.

== Retirement ==
Ianeiro was a high school teacher at St. Catharines Collegiate Institute and Vocational School.

In 2018, he was inducted into the Hamilton Soccer Hall of Fame.
