= Carlo Arghittu =

Canadian former soccer player and coach

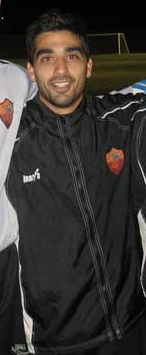
- Arghittu in 2007

Personal information
- Full name: Carlo Alberto Arghittu
- Date of birth: May 27, 1974 (age 52)
- Place of birth: St. Catharines, Ontario
- Height: 5 ft 7 in (1.70 m)
- Position: Forward

Senior career*
Years	Team	Apps	(Gls)
1990–1998	St. Catharines Wolves	50	(30)
1996–1997	Toronto Shooting Stars (indoor)	7	(1)
1999	Toronto Lynx	11	(0)
2000–2010	St. Catharines Wolves	202	(90)

Managerial career
- 2011–2013: St. Catharines Wolves
- 2014–2015: Niagara United (assistant coach)
- * Club domestic league appearances and goals

Carlo Arghittu (born May 27, 1974) is a Canadian former soccer player and coach who played in the Canadian National Soccer League, National Professional Soccer League, USL A-League, and the Canadian Professional Soccer League.

== Playing career ==
Arghittu began his career in 1990 in the Canadian National Soccer League after being spotted by St. Catharines Wolves head coach Jimmy Douglas. In his first stint with his hometown club he captured the CNSL Championship three times in 1993, 1995, 1997, and Umbro Cup in 1995, 1996. He contributed a goal in the 1997 CNSL Championship final against Toronto Supra, and won the match by a score of 4–3. In 1998, St. Catharines joined the newly formed Canadian Professional Soccer League, and once more Arghittu played an instrumental role during the 1998 season. He finished as the club`s second highest goal scorer with 12 goals, and won the inaugural CPSL Championship by defeating regular season champions Toronto Olympians 4-2 on penalties. He featured in the National Professional Soccer League during the 1996/1997 indoor season with the Toronto Shooting Stars, and appeared in seven matches and scored one goal.

In 1999, he was signed by the Toronto Lynx of the USL A-League, and made his debut on May 2, 1999, in a match against Minnesota Thunder. In his debut season in USL A-League he appeared in 11 matches. He returned to St. Catharines for the 2000 season, and captured his second CPSL Championship in 2001 by defeating Toronto Supra by a score of 1–0. His next notable achievement came in 2003 where he received the CSL Golden Boot award for finishing as the league`s highest goal scorer. After experiencing a rebuilding era, Arghittu helped St. Catharines claim a piece of silverware by winning the National Division title in 2007. On August 17, 2007, Arghittu scored a hat-trick as the Wolves pulled a 3-1 upset victory against the Serbian White Eagles. In 2010, he retired as the longest serving, and all-time highest goal scorer for St. Catharines.

== Managerial career ==
In 2009, he was appointed player/assistant coach under head coach James McGillivray. In 2011, he retired from competitive soccer and was chosen as the successor to McGillivray. Arghittu served as head coach for St. Catharines for three seasons. After St. Catharines departed the league in 2014 he served as an assistant coach for Bruno Reis for Niagara United.

== Honors ==
=== St. Catharines Wolves ===
- CNSL Championship (3): 1993, 1995, 1997
- Umbro Cup (3): 1994, 1995, 1996
- Canadian National Soccer League Regular Season Champions (1): 1997
- Canadian Soccer League National Division (1): 2007
- CPSL Championship (2): :: 1998, 2001
