= Zoran Jankovic (football manager) =

Yugoslavian former football manager

Personal information
- Place of birth: Belgrade, SFR Yugoslavia

Managerial career
- Years: Team
- 1989-1990: BSK Batajnica
- 1996: Vanier Cheetahs
- 1997: Vermont Voltage
- 2000: Montreal Impact
- 2001: Montreal Dynamites

Zoran Jankovic is a Yugoslavian former football manager who managed most notably in the USL A-League.

== Managerial career ==
Jankovic was born in Belgrade and emigrated to Montreal, Canada in 1991. Previously in Yugoslavia, he served as the manager for FK BSK Batajnica in the 1989-90 season. Once in Canada, he managed in the Ligue de Soccer Elite Quebec with Jean-Talon Rosemont. In 1996, he was named the men's soccer team head coach for Vanier College.

In 1997, he coached the Vermont Voltage in the USISL D-3 Pro League. In 2000, he was appointed the head coach for the Montreal Impact in the USL A-League. During his tenure with Montreal, he brought in several imports such as Darko Kolić, Dejan Gluščević, and signed several younger players. After four matches, he was dismissed from his position due to a poor start to the season.

On March 26, 2001, Jankovic was signed as the head coach of the newly formed Montreal Dynamites in the Canadian Professional Soccer League. He brought many of his former Montreal Impact signings from the previous year. With the Dynamites, he led his team to a fourth-place finish in the overall standings and secured a playoff berth. For his achievements, he was recognized as the league's coach of the year. In 2002, Jankovic resigned from his position to become the head coach of the ARSL (Association Régionale de Soccer des Laurentides), but remained as the technical director.

== Honours ==
=== Manager ===
Individual

- CPSL Coach of the Year: 2001
