= Garrett Caldwell =

American-born Canadian soccer player

Personal information
- Full name: Garrett Evan James Caldwell
- Date of birth: 6 November 1973 (age 53)
- Place of birth: Princeton, New Jersey, United States
- Height: 1.88 m (6 ft 2 in)
- Position: Goalkeeper

College career
Years	Team	Apps	(Gls)
- Princeton Tigers

Senior career*
Years	Team	Apps	(Gls)
1992	Winnipeg Fury	4	(0)
1995–1998	Colchester United	6	(0)
- Toronto Supra
Total		6	(0)

International career
1992	Canada U20	5	(0)
1994	Canada U23	5	(0)
- * Club domestic league appearances and goals

Garrett Evan James Caldwell (born 6 November 1973) is an American-born Canadian former soccer player who played as a goalkeeper in the Football League for Colchester United. He represented Canada at under-20 and under-23 levels.

== Club career ==
Born in Princeton, New Jersey, Caldwell attended University of British Columbia, playing for the men's soccer team, British Columbian Tigers. He also played for Canadian Soccer League team Winnipeg Fury.

Caldwell moved to England in 1995 to play for Football League club Colchester United. He made six first-team appearances for the U's between 1995 and 1998, making his debut in a Football League Trophy defeat to Swindon Town on 8 November 1995.

Caldwell left Colchester in 1998, returning to Canada to join up with Toronto Supra.

== International career ==
At the age of 18, Caldwell was a member of the Canada under-20 team that finished in third place at the 1992 CONCACAF U-20 Tournament which was held in Canada. He played five games for the under-20s in 1992, also featuring in the Paolo Valenti Trophy held in Italy.

Caldwell was later selected in the Canada under-23 team, featuring in the 1995 Pan American Games qualifying rounds and totalling another five appearances during the year. He was a member of the 1996 Olympic qualifying team, although he failed to make an appearance.
