= Rachid Madkour =

Moroccan footballer

Personal information
- Full name: Rachid Madkour
- Date of birth: April 1, 1977 (age 49)
- Place of birth: Morocco
- Height: 5 ft 8 in (1.73 m)
- Position: Attacking midfielder

Senior career*
| Years | Team | Apps | (Gls) |
| 2005 | Laval Dynamites | 5 | (3) |
| 2005 | Montreal Impact | 1 | (0) |
| 2006 | Laval Dynamites | 16 | (9) |
| 2007 | Trois-Rivières Attak | 1 | (0) |
- * Club domestic league appearances and goals as of January 25, 2015

Rachid Madkour' (born April 1, 1977) is a former Moroccan footballer who had stints in the Canadian Soccer League, and the USL First Division.

== Playing career ==
Madkour began his professional in North America in the Canadian Professional Soccer League with Laval Dynamites. He recorded his first ha-trick and first goals on June 24, 2005 against London City in a 4-1 victory. Midway through the season he was signed by the Montreal Impact of the USL First Division. His signing was announced on July 11, 2005, and was signed to add extra caliber due to injuries plaguing the Impact's strikers. Madkour made his debut for the club on August 7, 2005 in a match against Atlanta Silverbacks. He would only feature in a single match throughout the entire season for Montreal. Subsequently his contract wasn't renewed the following season.

In 2006, he returned to Laval and had a tremendous season with the club finishing as the team's leading goalscorer with 9 goals. He helped Laval clinch a playoff berth by finishing third in the National Division. In the postseason he appeared in the quarterfinal match against Toronto Croatia, but was ejected from the match by receiving his second red card resulting in 1-0 defeat. In 2007, he signed with newly expansion franchise Trois-Rivieres Attak making his debut for the club on September 1, 2007 in a semi-final match of the Open Canada Cup tournament against the Italia Shooters. He assisted the club in earning their first piece of silverware by claiming the Open Canada Cup, and clinching a playoff berth by finishing second in the National Division.
