= New Hampshire Ramblers =

New Hampshire Ramblers were an American soccer club. In 1995, the club was originally called the Montreal Ramblers, but were forced to move by FIFA before playing any games. They are most notable for having Khalil Azmi as their goalkeeper.

The semi-professional soccer club was founded in the late 1980s as Ramblers de Montreal by Noel Okorougo, financier and sports rights agent who succeeded Pascal Cifarelli as President of Ligue National du Soccer Quebec (LNSQ) and was also former Commissioner East of Canadian National Soccer League (CNSL) 1, 2 . During its years in LNSQ and CNSL Ramblers de Montreal played its home games at the Montreal Olympic Stadium annex in a highly competitive semi-professional league that included clubs such as Toronto Italia and Toronto Croatia both with huge ethnic support base.

At the end of the 1994 FIFA World Cup in USA, Ramblers de Montreal fortified its squad by signing Khalil Azmi 3,4, goalkeeper of Morocco National team in USA World Cup 1994 as well as other African and South American players with professional soccer experience. With higher quality players, some with World Cup and professional football experience, Montreal Ramblers quickly outgrew the competition available in its domestic league. In addition, the pool of professional soccer players and fan base in Montreal was not large enough to accommodate a semi-professional club alongside a professional team Impact de Montreal owned and financed by Saputo family and favored by the establishment in Quebec. Ramblers de Montreal made a cross border move to USA in 1995 as a USISL expansion franchise called New Hampshire Ramblers. Soccer authorities in Canada initially refused to grant Ramblers the right to relocate the semi-professional football franchise. 5,6.

The move of Ramblers FC franchise from Canada to US destroyed its progress on the field as many important players could not move to USA either because of work permits or ties to Montreal. The club was dealt a final blow when its original founder and patron Noel Okorougo departed to Europe in 1995 to work on Nike's Football aspirations in Africa. The USISL franchise lasted only one season in USA finishing 5th ahead of Connecticut Wolves and Boston Storm in Division 3 Pro League Capital Conference which also featured New York Fever, North Jersey Imperials, Pennsylvania Freedom and Albany Alleycats. 7 . Subsequently, John Motta converted the residue of the club to form New Hampshire Phantoms 5,6.

== Year-by-year ==
Year	Division	League	Reg. season	Playoffs	Open Cup
1995	3	USISL Pro League	5th, Capital	Did not qualify	Did not qualify

== 1995 Roster ==
Goalkeepers

- (Morocco) Khalil Azmi
- (United States) Scott Marshall

Defenders

- (Nigeria) Joel Ogbunamiri
- (Canada) Jerry Cipriani
- (Ivory Coast) Sinali Coulibaly
- (Romania) Zold Lajos
- (United States) Tom Wicker
- (Romania) Sebastian Nedelcu

Midfielders

- (United States) Torrance Colvin
- (United States) David Trickett
- (Canada) Jean Robert Toussaint
- (Poland) Thomas Kowsz
- (United States) Reggie Drew

Forwards

- (Chile) Marcello Tapia
- (Ghana) Kevin Halid
- (Bosnia and Herzegovina) Edin Dukić
- (United States) James Dedeus
- (Morocco) Mostafa Sahrane
- (Morocco) Khalid Choukr
- (Canada) Paul Daccobert

Head coach

- (Canada) Pierre Mindru
