= Jerry Cipriani =

Canadian former soccer player

Personal information
- Full name: Jerry Cipriani
- Place of birth: Hamilton, Ontario
- Positions: Defender; midfielder

Senior career*
Years	Team	Apps	(Gls)
1995	New Hampshire Ramblers	12	(2)
1996–2001	St. Catharines Wolves		
2002	Hamilton Thunder	8	(5)
- * Club domestic league appearances and goals

Jerry Cipriani is a Canadian former soccer player who played in the USISL Pro League, Canadian National Soccer League, and the Canadian Professional Soccer League.

== Playing career ==
Cipriani began his career in 1995 with the New Hampshire Ramblers of the USISL Pro League. In 1996, he signed with St. Catharines Wolves of the Canadian National Soccer League. He made his debut for the club on June 2, 1996, in a match against Toronto Italia. In his debut season with St. Catharines he captured the Umbro Cup by finishing first in the cup standings. The following season the team won the regular season championship, and the CNSL Championship. He contributed in the clubs playoff run by recording two goals in the finals against Toronto Supra.

He helped the Wolves repeat their success when the club joined the Canadian Professional Soccer League by winning the CPSL Championship in the 1998, and 2001 season. In 2002, Cipriani signed with newly expansion franchise the Hamilton Thunder. He made his debut for the club on May 11, 2002, in a friendly match against Toronto Lynx. He made his official debut for Hamilton on May 23, 2002, against Vaughan Shooters, and recorded two goals in a 5–1 victory. His tenure in Hamilton was short lived due to a dispute with the team owner.
