= St. Catharines Roma Wolves =

Canadian soccer team

- Full name: St. Catharines Club Roma Soccer
- Nicknames: The Wolves, Roma
- Founded: 1967; 59 years ago (as Club Roma Soccer Association)
- Stadium: Club Roma Stadium; St. Catharines, Ontario
- Capacity: 1500
- General Manager: Andrew Mammarella
- Head coach: Federico Turriziani (men); Kevin Trethowan (women)
- League: Ontario Premier League
- 2025: L1O-P, 7th (men); L2O Southwest, 5th (women)
- Website: http://www.romasoccer.com/
Home colours	Away colours

St. Catharines Roma Wolves (also known as St. Catharines Wolves or simply Roma Wolves), are a Canadian soccer team, founded in 1967. The team currently plays in the semi-professional Ontario Premier League in both the men's and women's divisions. The club is a former member of the Canadian Soccer League (CSL), where it fielded a professional team from 1998 to 2013, and now operates youth teams in the Peninsula Soccer League. Teams play out of Club Roma in St. Catharines, Ontario in the Niagara Peninsula. The team's colours are dark red and white, mimicking those of the famous Italian club A.S. Roma.

Formed in 1967 as "Club Roma Soccer Association", the club competed in various local leagues. In 1977 the club renamed itself the St. Catharines Roma, and joined the National Soccer League. The club went through a golden era in the 1990s and early 2000s, winning several trophies in the National Soccer League, and the Canadian Professional Soccer League. After winning the CPSL Championship in 2001, the team went into a decline and briefly rebounded in 2007 with a division title. Shortly after St. Catharines went through another rebuilding period, but failed to see its fruits as the club ceased fielding a professional team in 2014 after the de-sanctioning of the CSL by the Canadian Soccer Association. In 2021, the club reactivated and joined League1 Ontario.

== History ==
=== Formation and National Soccer League days (1978–92) ===
The club was formed in 1967, and went under the name of Club Roma Soccer Association and began operations in the Niagara Peninsula Soccer League. During their tenure in the Niagara League, the club achieved two regular season championships and two playoff championships. In 1972, the organization transferred to the Inter-City League where Roma quickly established itself as a powerhouse claiming a double in 1973, two consecutive playoff championships in 1974, and 1975. Their crowning achievement came in 1976 winning the Triple Crown – the league, cup and play-off championships.

The following year the club was granted a franchise in the National Soccer League (NSL), later renamed the CNSL with the addition of the Winnipeg Fury in 1993, and changed their name to St. Catharines Roma. The club's president Armand Di Fruscio would also serve as the president of the NSL from 1986 to 1995. St. Catharines would experience their first taste of success in the NSL during the early 1990s.

=== The golden era and CPSL founding member (1993–01) ===
The club's golden era began in 1993 winning the NSL championship, and finishing runners-up in 1994 along with an Umbro Cup. Prominent players during that time period were future Canadian internationals Tomasz Radzinski, Davide Xausa, Martin Dugas, and Paul Fenwick.

In the 1995 CNSL season Mark Kormet served as the head coach, and assembled a roster which would in later years play a dominant role within the CNSL, and its successor leagues. The roster consisted of Canadian international Lucio Ianiero, Dino Perri, Carlo Arghittu, Shayne Campbell, Paul Moore, Chris Handsor, and Gary McGuchan. The season marked the organization's first treble, winning the Umbro cup by defeating the Scarborough Astros on a penalty shootout. In the playoff finals the Wolves defeated the Toronto Jets, by a score of 2–1 with goals coming from Cameron Walker and Moore. At the conclusion of the season at the CNSL Awards banquet Kormet was named the CNSL Coach of the Year, while Chris Handsor received the MVP award.

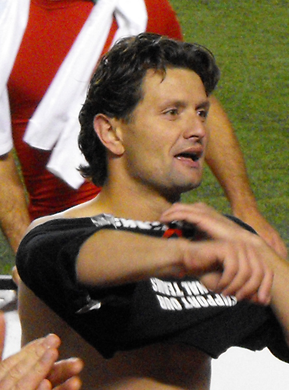
Canadian international Tomasz Radzinski played with St. Catharines Wolves before he went overseas to Europe.

Their success would continue through the following season as Dino Perri was given the dual role of coaching and playing for the team. The team roster was reinforced with the signings of Rick Titus, Peyvand Mossavat, Jerry Cipriani, Peter Sarantopoulos, and Peter Gastis. Perri managed to defend St. Cathraine's Umbro Cup by finishing first in the cup standings. In the regular season the Wolves finished second in the overall standings, and clinched a postseason berth, as well as posting the best defensive record throughout the season. Their opponents in the first round of the playoffs were the Toronto Supra, where St. Catharines advanced to the finals by winning the series on 2–1 on goals on aggregate. In the finals the Wolves faced the regular season champions Toronto Italia, but failed to capture the championship after losing by a score of 11–0 on goals on aggregate.

St. Catharines built on their 1996 season, and added reinforcements to the roster with the signings of Salvatore Borgh, and Gary Hughes. The Wolves continued their dynasty with another double victory for the club, going undefeated the entire league season and posting the best offensive record. In the first round of the postseason the Wolves faced Kosova Albanians, and advanced to the championship finals by winning the series 5–4 on goals on aggregate. St. Catharines faced Toronto Supra in the finals and claimed the championship by a score of 4–3 on goals on aggregate with goals coming from Cipriani, McGuchan, and Arghittu. In 1998, the CNSL merged with the stillborn Ontario Professional Soccer League and formed the Canadian Professional Soccer League. St. Catharines was a founding member along with three other CNSL clubs and four new expansion franchises.

In their debut season in the CPSL, St. Catharines would continue to flourish, and add prestige to its ranks. Where they secured a postseason berth by finishing second in the overall standings, and reached the finals of the Open Canada Cup tournament. In the finals they faced the league powerhouse Toronto Olympians, but lost to a score of 3–0. While in the postseason the Roma Wolves faced Glen Shields Sun Devils in the semi-finals which concluded in a 5–2 victory on goals on aggregate for the Wolves. The finals consisted of a revenge match between the Open Canada Cup finalists St. Catharines and Toronto – the match finished as a 2–2 draw which led to penalties where the Wolves denied the Olympians the chance of a treble by winning the game 4–2 in a penalty shootout, and reached a milestone by capturing the first CPSL Championship. The victory marked the sixth straight year that the club reached the league final and claimed their sixth league title in their 22-year-history. At the CPSL awards banquet Dino Perri received the CPSL Goalkeeper of the Year.

In 1999, St. Catharines experienced several bumps in the road throughout the season as losing their top striker Carlo Arghittu to the Toronto Lynx of the USL A-League. Lucio Ianiero took over the mantle of head coach, and failed to defend their championship title by failing to secure a postseason berth by finishing sixth in the overall standings. Though the team played poorly during the season they still managed to reach the semi-finals of the Open Canada Cup tournament where they faced the Olympians their rivals the previous season. The Wolves fell short in reaching the finals by losing the series to a score of 6–2 on goals on aggregate.

Roma Wolves recovered from their mediocre season with head coach Ianiero re-signing the core members of the team, by bringing back Arghittu, Hughes, and recruiting the services of Andrew McKay, and Danny Gallagher. St. Catharines began with a high note winning their first three matches, after losing a match to Toronto Olympians they bounced back with a seven-game undefeated streak. The team's momentum continued throughout the Open Canada Cup tournament where history repeated itself with St. Catharines reaching the finals, and facing their rivals the Toronto Olympians. Unfortunately the Wolves fell victim once more to Toronto losing by a score of 1–0. Overall the 2000 season was a success for the organization as they finished runners-up in the overall standings, and were tied with Toronto Olympians with the best defensive record. Their opponents in the postseason were Toronto Croatia, but were eliminated from the competition by losing the match by a score of 3–1. For his efforts Ianiero received the CPSL Coach of the Year award.

In 2001 the Wolves maintained their previous season roster with the addition of Simon Gatti, and Matt Albrecht. Throughout the season, St. Catharines experienced a roller coaster season by barely qualifying for the postseason as they managed to clinch the final playoff berth by three points. In the Open Canada Cup tournament they faced controversy in the semi-finals match against the Ottawa Wizards by using two ineligible players which resulted in their 1–0 victory to be reversed and given to Ottawa. Nonetheless, Roma Wolves first opponents in the playoffs were the Montreal Dynamites, where St. Catharines came out victorious with a 2–1 victory with goals coming from Frank Zumpano, and McGutchan. In the next round they faced regular season champions Ottawa Wizards, and avenged their Open Canada Cup loss with McGutchan providing once more the goal which resulted in a 1–0 victory for the club, and a trip to the CPSL Championship finals match. The finals consisted of St. Catharines facing Toronto Supra, a repeat of the 1997 CNSL Championship match. After a scoreless 90' min match the game went into overtime with John Sozio scoring the winning goal at 116' min, and thus claiming the Wolves second CPSL Championship title. Danny Gallagher, along with Garrett Caldwell were voted the CPSL Cup finals MVP.

=== Rebuilding period (2002–06) ===
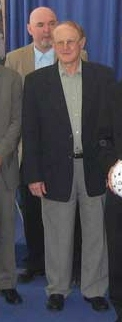
Armand Di Fruscio (right) played a prominent role in the building of St. Catharines.

The 2002 season brought significant changes within the structure as the club went through a rebuilding stage. St. Catharines transferred five core veterans to expansion franchise Hamilton Thunder, while others retired. One notable addition to the changes were the hiring of former Roma Wolves head coach Jimmy Douglas as the General Manager For the majority of the season the club was plagued with injuries, suspensions, and a poor team chemistry which resulted in a struggle to clinch the final playoff berth, and ended in a failure by falling short by four points. The Wolves didn't feature better in the Open Canada Cup where they were eliminated in the first round of the tournament by Hamilton. The season marked an end to the club's golden era which began in the final years of the CNSL, and concluded in the infant stages of the CPSL. The Wolves would go through a rebuilding period that would drag out for about five seasons.

During their rebuilding period Ianiero retired in 2004 after failing to qualify for the playoffs in two straight seasons, but managed a respectable run in the 2003 Open Canada Cup tournament by reaching the semi-finals before losing out to the Metro Lions by a score of 2–1. Another notable achievement was accomplished by prolific striker Carlo Arghittu by finishing as the league's top scorer in 2003. Tom Bernardi a former Roma Wolves player was chosen as Ianiero successor for the 2005 season. After a bold attempt to secure a playoff berth he fell short by two points. In 2006, Miro Marjanovic was brought in to coach the Wolves, but also fell short in securing the final postseason berth by three points.

=== Return to prominence and departure (2007–14) ===
After five straight seasons of failing to secure a postseason berth, St. Catharines appointed the services of James McGillivray as head coach. McGillivray was instrumental in improving the performance of St. Catharines during the 2007 season. The Wolves returned to prosperity by achieving a nine-game undefeated streak, and clinching the National Division title their first piece of silverware since 2001. Their opponents in the quarterfinals of the playoffs were the Canadian Lions, and advanced to the next round by winning the match 10–9 in a penalty shootout. St. Catharines faced Toronto Croatia in the semi-finals, but fell short by a score of 3–2. McGillivary, and Claudio Perri were rewarded with the CSL Coach of the Year, and CSL Goalkeeper of the Year awards for their contributions. McGillivary tenure with St. Catharines would last for another two seasons, where in both seasons he led them to the playoffs, and each season was eliminated in the preliminary round of the playoffs. In 2009, long time general manager and team builder Armand Di Fruscio was awarded the Harry Paul Gauss Award by the league.

In 2011, McGillivary signed with expansion rivals Niagara United, and his replacement was Carlo Arghittu. The Wolves went through another period of rebuilding under Arghittu, failing to qualify for the postseason during his three-year tenure. In 2012–13, following the controversy faced by the CSL over the Canadian Soccer Association decision to adopt the recommendations from the Rethink Management Report the CSA de-sanctioned the league putting the future of many of its clubs and operations in doubt. In May 2014 the Roma Wolves ceased operations of the professional team due to the de-sanctioning of the CSL, including financial, volunteer issues and combined with competition from Niagara United for players in the Niagara Peninsula.

St. Catharines Club Roma Soccer still operates as a soccer club providing a place to play for children, both boys and girls ages 3 to 19, and women in house leagues, local travel leagues (Niagara Soccer League and the Hamilton MJ Soccer League). There are still competitive men's teams in the Peninsula Soccer League.

=== Return to semi-pro ===
In 2021, the team was re-launched, joining League1 Ontario. In 2022 the Italian Federico Turriziani was hired as Head Coach to lead the Men's team after his experience with the Azerbaijan National Men's Team. After 8 games won in a row he guide the team to win the Play Off match to be promoted in the Premier Division against Guelph United. In 2022, they added a women's team in the League1 Ontario women's division.

== Year-by-year ==
=== Men ===
Year	League	Regular season	Playoffs	NSL Cup
1977	National Soccer League 2nd Division	5th	did not qualify	n/a
1978	National Soccer League 2nd Division	1st	Champion	n/a
1979	National Soccer League	2nd	Were not played	n/a
1980	National Soccer League	6th	Runners-up	n/a
1981	National Soccer League	6th	did not qualify	n/a
1982	National Soccer League	3rd	n/a	Runners-up
1983	National Soccer League	5th	n/a	n/a
1984	National Soccer League	n/a	n/a	n/a
1985	National Soccer League	5th	Quarter-Finals	n/a
1986	National Soccer League	7th	did not qualify	n/a
1987	National Soccer League	9th	did not qualify	n/a
1988	National Soccer League	5th	n/a	n/a
1989	National Soccer League	8th	Were not played	n/a
1990	National Soccer League	3rd	Were not played	Champions
1991	National Soccer League	3rd	Were not played	n/a
1992	National Soccer League	2nd	Were not played	n/a
Year	League	Regular season	Playoffs	CNSL Cup
1993	Canadian National Soccer League	4th	Champion	Semi-Finals
1994	Canadian National Soccer League	2nd	Runners-up	Champion
1995	Canadian National Soccer League	2nd	Champion	Champion
1996	Canadian National Soccer League	2nd	Runners-up	Champion
1997	Canadian National Soccer League	1st	Champion	4th
Year	League	Regular season	Playoffs	Open Canada Cup
1998	Canadian Professional Soccer League	2nd	Champions	Runner-up
1999	Canadian Professional Soccer League	6th	did not qualify	Semi-Finals
2000	Canadian Professional Soccer League	2nd	Semi-Finals	Runner-up
2001	Canadian Professional Soccer League	5th	Champions	Semi-Finals
2002	Canadian Professional Soccer League	4th, Western	did not qualify	First Round
2003	Canadian Professional Soccer League	4th, Western	did not qualify	Semi-Finals
2004	Canadian Professional Soccer League	6th, Western	did not qualify	Second Round
2005	Canadian Professional Soccer League	4th, Western	did not qualify	Second Round
2006	Canadian Soccer League	5th, National	did not qualify	Second Round
2007	Canadian Soccer League	1st, National	Semi-Finals	Second Round
2008	Canadian Soccer League	4th, National	Quarter-Finals	n/a
2009	Canadian Soccer League	2nd, National	Quarter-Finals	n/a
2010	Canadian Soccer League	13th	did not qualify	n/a
2011	Canadian Soccer League	12th	did not qualify	n/a
2012	Canadian Soccer League	15th	did not qualify	n/a
2013	Canadian Soccer League	11th	did not qualify	n/a
Year	League	Regular season	Playoffs	L1 Cup
2021	League1 Ontario Summer Championship	6th	Not held	Not held
2022	League1 Ontario	16th	did not qualify	Not held
2023	League1 Ontario	16th	did not qualify	Not held
2024	League1 Ontario Championship	3rd ↑	Not held	Round of 16
2025	League1 Ontario Premier	7th	Not held	Round of 16

=== Women ===
Season	League	Teams	Record	Rank	Playoffs	League Cup	Ref
2022	League1 Ontario	20	8–1–10	11th	Did not qualify	–	
2023	League1 Ontario	19	6–3–9	14th	Did not qualify	–	
2024	League2 Ontario Southwest	10	6–0–8	6th	–	Round of 16	
2025	League2 Ontario Southwest	10	6–3–5	5th	–	Round of 16	

== Notable players ==
Canada

- Carlo Arghittu (1990–98), (2000-10)
- Salvatore Borgh (1997–01)
- Shayne Campbell (1994–95), (1999)
- Jimmy Douglas (1980s)
- Martin Dugas (1994)
- Paul Fenwick (1986-87)
- Simon Gatti (2002)
- Chris Handsor (1995)
- Lucio Ianiero (1995-04)
- Paul Moore (1995-96)
- Peyvand Mossavat (1996-97)
- Tomasz Radzinski (1994)
- Peter Sarantopoulos (1996)
- Josh Wagenaar (2002)
- Cameron Walker (1995)
- Davide Xausa (1996-97)

United States

- Andrew McKay (2000-01)
- Kofi Opare (2007-08)
- Randy Pikuzinski (1987)
- Rudy Pikuzinski (1987)
- Josie Valeri (2023-24) (women's team)

Trinidad and Tobago

- Malcolm Shaw (2026-)
- Anton Skerritt (1994), (1996)
- Rick Titus (1996)

San Marino

- Eleonora Cecchini (2023) (women's team)

== Head coaches ==
Years	Name	Nation
1994-1995	Mark Kormet	Canada
1996-1998	Dino Perri	Canada
1999-2004	Lucio Ianiero	Canada
2005	Tom Bernadi	Canada
2006	Miro Marjanovic	Serbia
2007-2010	James McGillivray	Canada
2011-2013	Carlo Arghittu	Canada
2021	Federico Turriziani	Italy

== Honours ==
- League1 Ontario Play Off Champions (1): 2024
- CNSL Championship (3): 1993, 1995, 1997
- Canadian National Soccer League Regular Season Champions (1): 1997
- NSL Cup (1): 1990
- CNSL Umbro Cup (3): 1994, 1995, 1996
- CPSL Championship (2): 1998, 2001
- Canadian Soccer League National Division (1): 2007
- NSL Second Division Champions (1): 1978
- Inter-City Soccer League - Hiram Walker Cup (4): 1973, 1974, 1975, 1976
- Inter-City Soccer League - McGuiness Trophy (2): 1973, 1976
