= 1975 Canadian Soccer League season =

National Soccer League
- Season: 1975
- Champions: Toronto Italia (5th title)
- League cup: Toronto Croatia
- Top goalscorer: Momčilo Stojanović (42)
- Best goalkeeper: Vangelis Syrigos

The 1975 Canadian Soccer League season was the fifty-second season for the National Soccer League (NSL) which operated under the Canadian Soccer League (CSL) name for the season. The season began in April and concluded in late October with Toronto Italia securing a double (NSL Championship, and First Division title). Italia would also win the Canadian Open Cup by defeating the Challenge Trophy champions London Boxing and Athletic Club of Victoria from British Columbia. The Serbian White Eagles were the NSL Cup winners and the Canadian representative for the 1975 CONCACAF Champions' Cup.

In the Second Division, the Windsor Stars were the divisional champions by finishing first in the standings, which secured automatic promotion to the First Division. A postseason tournament was utilized in the Second Division, where St. Catherines Heidelberg won the NSL II Championship after defeating Windsor. As the membership in the league increased, the NSL was divided into two separate divisions (First and Second Division) with a promotion and relegation system. Toronto Croatia would purchase 50% of the Toronto Metros to form Toronto Metros-Croatia in the North American Soccer League, while still retaining a reserve team in the NSL.

== Overview ==
The National Soccer League (NSL) went through a series of reforms beginning with the partitioning of the league into two separate divisions (First and Second divisions) with a promotion and relegation system. The top ten teams from the previous year were placed in the First Division, while the remainder and expansion clubs were relegated to the Second Division. How the promotion and relegation system was operated in the NSL was that the last-placed team in the First Division was automatically relegated, while the Second Division champion would receive an automatic promotion to the First Division. The second-last team in the First Division would play in a series of matches against the runner-ups in the Second Division to determine which team would be relegated or promoted. A name change was included in the reforms, with the league operating under the Canadian Soccer League (CSL) name to distinguish itself from other regional leagues using a similar name. The CSL also provided additional incentives for match competitiveness by issuing prize money to the divisional champions and runner-ups.

The Toronto-based CSL teams began using Lamport Stadium in 1975, but were forced to split their home matches between CNE Stadium. and Varsity Stadium as Lamport required further repairs throughout the season. The repairs had an economic effect on the Toronto clubs at the live gate, with only Toronto Italia generating a profit as their home matches were played at York Stadium. The Serbian White Eagles were embroiled in a dispute with the league executive committee, as the White Eagles were banned from league competition after a fan invasion during their 1975 CONCACAF Champions' Cup match against C.F. Monterrey. The decision was appealed and taken to the Canadian Soccer Association (CSA), where the ban was lifted, with Serbia required to play in a closed venue without spectators. The league ownership began a policy to limit the usage of import players in an attempt to ultimately Canadianize the league, and placed a limit of six import players per team.

The boundaries of the league were once more located around the Montreal–Windsor corridor, with the CSL returning to Windsor, Ontario, with the Windsor Stars being granted a franchise. Oakville United was granted a franchise, and a developmental team sponsored by the Ontario government called the Ontario Selects was placed in the Second Division. The league continued to have a presence in Montreal, Quebec, with the Montreal Castors acquiring Montreal Cantalia's franchise rights. Two noted franchise applications were rejected at the annual league membership meeting held on December 15, 1974. The applications were submitted by London Marconi and St. Catharines Roma. St. Catharines failed to secure the necessary league votes, while London's bid was rejected by club member London City as they held the territorial rights to the region.

The rivalry between the NSL and Toronto Metros of the North American Soccer League was further intensified with the Metros' ownership attempting to lobby the Ontario Soccer Association (OSA) to place further restrictions on the allowance of imports, and with Toronto Croatia becoming part-owners with the Metros. On several occasions, some NSL teams outdrew the NASL club in attendance numbers.

== Teams ==
Team	City	Stadium	Manager
Hamilton City	Hamilton, Ontario		Andy Pollock
Hamilton Croatia	Hamilton, Ontario	Ivor Wynne Stadium	
Hamilton Italo-Canadians	Hamilton, Ontario	Brian Timmis Stadium	Ken McDonald
London City	London, Ontario	Cove Road Stadium	
Montreal Castors	Montreal, Quebec	Marquette Park	Jarbas Faustinho
Oakville United	Oakville, Ontario	Blakelock High School	
Ontario Selects			Arthur Rodrigues
Ottawa Tigers	Ottawa, Ontario	Mooney's Bay Park	Anselmo Suarez
Serbian White Eagles	Toronto, Ontario	Lamport Stadium	Dragoslav Šekularac
Srbija Kitchener	Kitchener, Ontario		
St. Catharines Heidelberg	St. Catharines, Ontario		Alex Crawley
Toronto Croatia	Toronto, Ontario	Lamport Stadium	Dave Jones
Toronto First Portuguese	Toronto, Ontario	Lamport Stadium	Neff Santos
Toronto Homer	Toronto, Ontario	Lamport Stadium	Gus Mesologitis
Toronto Hungaria	Toronto, Ontario	CNE Stadium	
Toronto Italia	York, Ontario	York Stadium	Fiorigi Pagliuso
Toronto Macedonia	Toronto, Ontario	Lamport Stadium	
Toronto Melita	Toronto, Ontario	Lamport Stadium	
Toronto Polonia	Toronto, Ontario	Lamport Stadium	
Toronto Ukrainians	Toronto, Ontario	Lamport Stadium	
Windsor Stars	Windsor, Ontario	Windsor Stadium	Roy Cheetham

Location of NSL teams outside of Toronto for the 1975 NSL season.

Locations of teams in Quebec for the 1975 NSL season.

== Standings ==
=== First Division ===
Pos	Team	Pld	W	D	L	GF	GA	GD	Pts	Qualification
1	Toronto Italia (C)	38	25	11	2	98	33	+65	61	Qualification for Playoffs
2	Toronto First Portuguese	38	26	5	7	79	35	+44	57	
3	Toronto Homer	38	24	6	8	95	36	+59	54	
4	Serbian White Eagles	38	23	7	8	105	30	+75	53	
5	Toronto Macedonia	38	22	6	10	74	29	+45	50	
6	Hamilton Croatia	38	17	9	12	60	57	+3	43	
7	Hamilton City	38	15	6	17	63	57	+6	36	
8	London City	38	13	9	16	68	72	−4	35	
9	Toronto Croatia (R)	38	11	6	21	40	57	−17	28	
10	Hamilton Italo-Canadians (R)	38	8	3	27	46	109	−63	19	

Updated to match(es) played on October 30, 1975. Source: http://canadiansoccerleague.ca/wp-content/uploads/2014/06/NSL_1921_1992.pdf
Rules for classification: 1) points; 2) goal difference; 3) number of goals scored.
(C) Champions; (R) Relegated

=== Second Division ===
Pos	Team	Pld	W	D	L	GF	GA	GD	Pts	Qualification
1	Windsor Stars (C, P)	30	21	4	5	81	23	+58	46	Qualification for Playoffs
2	Montreal Castors (P)	30	21	1	8	65	30	+35	43	
3	Oakville United	30	18	4	8	51	29	+22	40	
4	St. Catharines Heidelberg (O)	30	13	5	12	42	44	−2	31	
5	Srbija Kitchener	30	9	7	14	44	56	−12	25	
6	Ottawa Tigers	30	8	4	18	42	45	−3	20	
7	Ontario Selects	30	8	4	18	24	49	−25	20	
8	Toronto Hungaria	30	7	5	18	37	64	−27	19	
9	Toronto Ukrainians	30	3	6	21	18	79	−61	12	
10	Toronto Polonia	30	4	3	23	13	88	−75	11	
11	Toronto Melita	30	2	3	25	17	117	−100	7	

Updated to match(es) played on October 30, 1975. Source: http://canadiansoccerleague.ca/wp-content/uploads/2014/06/NSL_1921_1992.pdf
Rules for classification: 1) points; 2) goal difference; 3) number of goals scored.
(C) Champions; (O) Play-off winners; (P) Promoted

== Second division playoffs ==
Windsor Stars, Montreal Castors, Oakville United, and St. Catharines Heidelberg were the top four clubs that qualified for the postseason. Though Montreal secured a playoff berth, they opted out of the tournament because of a shortage of players due to injuries and the departure of their imports. The decision resulted in St. Catharines receiving a bye to the finals.

=== Semifinals ===
October 12, 1975	Windsor Stars	7–1	Oakville United	Windsor, Ontario
15:00	Pedro Da Silva, Julian Stoja, Jair da Costa; Billy Lee; Syrigos	[ Report]	Rick Lowther	Stadium: Windsor Stadium; Attendance: 1800

=== Finals ===
October 18, 1975	St. Catharines Heidelberg	2–1	Windsor Stars	St. Catharines, Ontario
		[ Report]

October 19, 1975	Windsor Stars	2–2	St. Catharines Heidelberg	Windsor, Ontario
15:00	Manfred Michael; Billy Lee	[ Report]	Billy Watton; Charlie Carey	Stadium: Windsor Stadium; Attendance: 1000

== Canadian Open Cup ==
The Canadian Open Cup was a tournament organized by the National Soccer League in 1971, where the NSL champion would face the Challenge Trophy winners to determine the best team throughout the country. The 1974 edition served as a qualifier match to determine the Canadian representative to the CONCACAF Champions' Cup. Toronto Italia was the NSL representative for the 1975 competition, while their opponents were the London Boxing Club of Victoria, who were the British Columbia Provincial Soccer Championship and Challenge Trophy titleholders.

October 26, 1975	Toronto Italia	2–0	London Boxing Club of Victoria	York, Ontario
	Fahy 24'; Romanovic 46'	[ Report]		Stadium: York Stadium; Attendance: 3500
