= 1976 National Soccer League season =

National Soccer League
- Season: 1976
- Champions: Toronto Italia (regular season); Toronto First Portuguese (playoffs, 2nd title)
- League cup: Toronto Panhellenic
- Top goalscorer: Emmanuel Kulu - Second Division- (21)

The 1976 National Soccer League season was the fifty-third season under the National Soccer League (NSL) name. The season began in late April and concluded in early October, with Toronto Panhellenic securing the league double (NSL Championship and NSL Cup) by defeating Toronto First Portuguese in a two-match series for the NSL Championship. In the NSL Cup final, Panhellenic defeated Toronto Italia, while Italia successfully defended the First Division title by finishing first in the standings. In the Second Division, Hamilton Italo-Canadians defeated Toronto Croatia for the division title and NSL II Championship.

Toronto Italia and Serbian White Eagles were scheduled to participate in the 1976 CONCACAF Champions' Cup, and the NSL was sanctioned by the Canadian Soccer Association (CSA) for the season. The NSL was operative in Northern Ontario and Quebec and expanded into the United States with a franchise in Buffalo, New York.

== Overview ==
The National Soccer League (NSL) expanded its boundaries outside of Canada with a franchise based in Buffalo, New York, known as the Buffalo Blazers. The NSL made further territorial gains with a return to Northern Ontario with the acceptance of the Sudbury Cyclones. The previous time the NSL was active in the northern region was in the 1971 season. Both Buffalo and Sudbury were placed in the Second Division.

Though the league expanded beyond the Montreal–Windsor Corridor, the membership decreased from 21 teams to 18. The slight decrease resulted from Srbija Kitchener and Toronto Melita taking a leave of absence when both clubs were suspended by the Ontario Soccer Association (OSA) for payments to amateur players. The two other departing clubs were the Ontario Selects, and Toronto Ukraina took a two-year sabbatical and returned for the 1978 season. Further changes included the relocation of Oakville United to Toronto and the addition of another team in the Niagara region, as Hamilton City became known as Welland Lions Croatia. Another notable change occurred with the renaming of Toronto Homer to Toronto Panhellenic.

Several changes were implemented to the league's structure with the approval of a new constitution, which transferred more voting power from the league's executive committee to the league ownership. Reports were also circulating of the creation of a league commissioner to replace Joe Piccininni as league president, but Piccininni resumed his duties throughout the season. The regular-season schedule was revised to prevent interlocking play between the First and Second Division teams, but both divisions were permitted to play one another in the NSL Cup. Restrictions were also placed on the allowance of five imported players to each team.

== Teams ==
Team	City	Stadium	Manager
Buffalo Blazers	Buffalo, New York	Lackwanna Stadium	Alex Perolli
Hamilton Croatia	Hamilton, Ontario	Brian Timmis Stadium	
Hamilton Italo-Canadians	Hamilton, Ontario	Ivor Wynne Stadium	
London City	London, Ontario	Cove Road Stadium	Graham Sawyer
Montreal Castors	Montreal, Quebec	Marquette Park	Jarbas Faustinho
Ottawa Tigers	Ottawa, Ontario	Mooney's Bay Park	Sandro Rausa
Serbian White Eagles	Toronto, Ontario	Lamport Stadium	John Dempsey
Sudbury Cyclones	Sudbury, Ontario		Fulvio Stepancich
St. Catharines Heidelberg	St. Catharines, Ontario	Heidelberg Stadium	Alex Crawley
Toronto Croatia	Toronto, Ontario	Lamport Stadium	
Toronto Falcons	Toronto, Ontario	Lamport Stadium	
Toronto First Portuguese	Toronto, Ontario	Lamport Stadium	
Toronto Italia	York, Ontario	York Stadium	Fiorigi Pagliuso
Toronto Macedonia	Toronto, Ontario	Lamport Stadium	
Toronto Panhellenic	Toronto, Ontario	Lamport Stadium	Luiz Villa
Toronto Polonia	Toronto, Ontario	Lamport Stadium	
Welland Lions Croatia	Welland, Ontario	Plymouth Park	Ivica Tanković
Windsor Stars	Windsor, Ontario	Wigle Park Windsor Stadium	Ivan Marković

=== Coaching changes ===
Team	Outgoing coach	Manner of departure	Date of vacancy	Position in table	Incoming coach	Date of appointment
Sudbury Cyclones	Peter Gallo	replaced	May 1976		Fulvio Stepancich	May, 1976
Buffalo Blazers	Al Block	replaced	June 1, 1976		Vincent Lauricella	June 1, 1976
Toronto Italia	(Portugal) Arthur Rodrigues	replaced	July 9, 1976	1st in July	Fiorigi Pagliuso	July 9, 1976
Windsor Stars	(England) Roy Cheetham	fired	August 5, 1976	8th in August	(Croatia) Ivan Marković	August 5, 1976

Location of NSL teams outside of Toronto for the 1976 NSL season.

Locations of teams in Quebec for the 1976 NSL season.

== Standings ==
=== First Division ===
Pos	Team	Pld	W	D	L	GF	GA	GD	Pts	Qualification
1	Toronto Italia (C)	27	17	7	3	53	13	+40	41	Qualification for Playoffs
2	Montreal Castors	27	16	5	6	47	18	+29	37	
3	Toronto Panhellenic (O)	27	15	7	5	46	19	+27	37	
4	Toronto First Portuguese	27	14	5	8	51	27	+24	33	
5	Windsor Stars	27	11	6	10	47	31	+16	28	
6	London City	27	10	8	9	44	40	+4	28	
7	Serbian White Eagles	27	10	6	11	38	48	−10	26	
8	Toronto Macedonia	27	8	5	14	33	49	−16	21	
9	Hamilton Croatia (R)	27	4	3	20	26	68	−42	11	
10	Welland Lions Croatia (R)	27	3	2	22	18	88	−70	8	

Updated to match(es) played on September 30, 1976. Source: http://canadiansoccerleague.ca/wp-content/uploads/2014/06/NSL_1921_1992.pdf
Rules for classification: 1) points; 2) goal difference; 3) number of goals scored.
(C) Champions; (O) Play-off winners; (R) Relegated

=== Second Division ===
Pos	Team	Pld	W	D	L	GF	GA	GD	Pts	Qualification
1	Hamilton Italo-Canadians (C, O, P)	21	19	1	1	50	11	+39	39	Qualification for Playoffs
2	Toronto Croatia (P)	21	14	3	4	48	27	+21	31	
3	Toronto Polonia	21	11	2	8	38	21	+17	24	
4	Buffalo Blazers	21	9	2	10	37	50	−13	20	
5	Ottawa Tigers	21	9	1	11	36	40	−4	19	
6	Sudbury Cyclones	21	7	4	10	27	32	−5	18	
7	Toronto Falcons	21	4	2	15	18	47	−29	10	
8	St. Catharines Heidelberg	21	2	3	16	16	42	−26	7	

Updated to match(es) played on September 30, 1976. Source: http://canadiansoccerleague.ca/wp-content/uploads/2014/06/NSL_1921_1992.pdf
Rules for classification: 1) points; 2) goal difference; 3) number of goals scored.
(C) Champions; (O) Play-off winners; (P) Promoted

== Playoffs ==
=== Finals ===
October 7, 1976	Toronto Panhellenic	0–1	Toronto First Portuguese	Toronto, Ontario
		[ Report]	Barros	Stadium: Lamport Stadium; Attendance: 3000

October 10, 1976	Toronto First Portuguese	0–1 (2–4 p)	Toronto Panhellenic	Toronto, Ontario
15:00		[ Report]	Alberto Gerez	Stadium: Lamport Stadium; Attendance: 5000
	Penalties
	Mike Boorman		Alberto Gerez; Araquem de Melo; Kozak

== Cup ==
The cup tournament was a separate contest from the rest of the season, in which all eighteen teams took part. The tournament would conclude in a final match for the Cup.

=== Finals ===
September 20, 1976	Toronto Italia	2–3	Toronto Panhellenic	Toronto, Ontario
	Di Pede; Loparić	[ Report]	Fernando Barbosa; Araquem de Melo,	Stadium: Lamport Stadium; Attendance: 4000; Referee: Bill Devorski

== Promotion and relegation matches ==
The promotion and relegation system utilized by the National Soccer League operated with the last-placed team in the First Division being automatically relegated, while the Second Division champion would receive an automatic promotion to the First Division. The second last team in the First Division would play in a series of matches against the runner-ups in the Second Division to determine which team would be relegated or promoted.

=== Matches ===
October 6, 1976	Hamilton Croatia	2–2	Toronto Croatia	Hamilton, Ontario
		[ Report]		Stadium: Brian Timmis Stadium

October 10, 1976	Toronto Croatia	1–0	Hamilton Croatia	Toronto, Ontario
	Harvey	[ Report]		Stadium: Lamport Stadium
