= 1979 National Soccer League (Canada) season =

Canadian soccer season

National Soccer League
- Season: 1979
- Champions: Toronto First Portuguese (3rd title)
- League cup: Toronto First Portuguese

The 1979 National Soccer League season was the fifty-sixth season under the National Soccer League (NSL) name. The season began in May 1979 and concluded in September 1979, with Toronto First Portuguese producing a perfect season, which granted them the NSL Championship. First Portuguese would also secure the double by defeating Toronto Panhellenic for the NSL Cup. Toronto's undefeated streak lasted until the 1980 season and amounted to 52 games, with Toronto Panhellenic breaking the streak.

The NSL was operating a franchise in Northern Ontario and Quebec, and expanded its boundaries into the United States with two franchises in Detroit, Michigan.

== Overview ==
The membership in the league experienced a sharp decline as a mass exodus of clubs departed from the league, which caused the NSL to dissolve its Second Division. The primary reason for the mass departures revolved around a league bylaw that required all clubs to successfully pay all membership dues on the required deadline to avoid suspensions. Members such as Mississauga Hungaria, Ottawa Tigers, St. Catharines Heidelberg, Toronto Polonia, and Windsor Stars disbanded their teams, while Montreal Castors had intentions of acquiring a franchise in the North American Soccer League. Toronto Italia and Buffalo Blazers were inactive for the season but returned for the 1980 campaign. Though the league experienced a decline in membership, it still expanded further into the United States with the acceptance of Detroit Besa and Detroit Vardar.

The NSL also retained its presence in Quebec with the return of the Montreal Stars and an additional team in the Greater Toronto Area known as the Toronto Canadians. Throughout the regular season, the standings had to be revised as Detroit Vardar withdrew from the competition. There were also reports circulating about preliminary plans for a potential national soccer league throughout the country.

=== Teams ===
Team	City	Stadium	Manager
Bradford Marshlanders	Bradford, Ontario	Bradford District High School	Dave Reid
Detroit Besa	Hamtramck, Michigan	Keyworth Stadium	Nino Berisic
Detroit Vardar (Note: Detroit withdrew from league throughout the season)	Detroit, Michigan		
Hamilton Italo-Canadians	Hamilton, Ontario	Ivor Wynne Stadium	Carlo Del Monte
Montreal Stars	Montreal, Quebec	Jarry Park	
London City	London, Ontario	Cove Road Stadium	
Toronto Serbians	Toronto, Ontario	Lamport Stadium	Nikola Ivetić
Sudbury Cyclones	Sudbury, Ontario	Queen's Athletic Field	Peter Severinac
St. Catharines Roma	St. Catharines, Ontario	Club Roma Stadium	
Toronto Canadians	Scarborough, Ontario	Birchmount Stadium	
Toronto Croatia	Etobicoke, Ontario	Centennial Park Stadium	
Toronto Falcons	Toronto, Ontario	Lamport Stadium	
Toronto First Portuguese	Toronto, Ontario	Lamport Stadium	
Toronto Italia	Etobicoke, Ontario	Centennial Park Stadium	
Toronto Panhellenic	Toronto, Ontario	Lamport Stadium	
Toronto Ukrainians	Scarborough, Ontario	Birchmount Stadium	

Location of NSL teams outside of Toronto for the 1979 NSL season.

Locations of teams in Quebec for the 1979 NSL season.

== Final standings ==
Pos	Team	Pld	W	D	L	GF	GA	GD	Pts	Qualification
1	Toronto First Portuguese (C, O)	25	23	2	0	93	9	+84	48	Qualification for Playoffs
2	St. Catharines Roma	26	16	5	5	57	21	+36	37	
3	Toronto Falcons	23	16	3	4	60	22	+38	35	
4	Hamilton Italo-Canadians	20	15	3	2	44	9	+35	33	
5	Montreal Stars	23	10	4	9	45	36	+9	24	
6	Sudbury Cyclones	23	10	3	10	40	32	+8	23	
7	Detroit Besa	24	7	6	11	27	41	−14	20	
8	Toronto Panhellenic	22	8	4	10	31	26	+5	20	
9	London City	23	6	4	13	25	41	−16	16	
10	Toronto Canadians	24	4	8	12	23	42	−19	16	
11	Toronto Croatia	21	6	4	11	17	46	−29	16	
12	Toronto Ukrainians	21	3	7	11	16	35	−19	13	
13	Bradford Marshlanders	25	5	3	17	19	77	−58	13	
14	Toronto Serbians	20	0	6	14	13	65	−52	6	

Updated to match(es) played on September 30, 1979. Source: http://canadiansoccerleague.ca/wp-content/uploads/2014/06/NSL_1921_1992.pdf
Rules for classification: 1) points; 2) goal difference; 3) number of goals scored.
(C) Champions; (O) Play-off winners

== Cup ==
The cup tournament was a separate contest from the rest of the season, in which all fifteen teams took part. The tournament would conclude in a final match for the Cup.

=== Finals ===
September 3, 1979	Toronto First Portuguese	1–0	Toronto Panhellenic	Toronto, Ontario
	Tito 30'	[ Report]		Stadium: Lamport Stadium
