= 1980 National Soccer League (Canada) season =

National Soccer League
- Season: 1980
- Champions: Toronto Falcons (regular season); Toronto Panhellenic (playoffs, 1st title)
- League cup: Toronto Italia
- Top goalscorer: Mike Burke (24)
- Best goalkeeper: Robert Judd

The 1980 National Soccer League season was the fifty-seventh season under the National Soccer League (NSL) name. The season began in May 1980 and concluded in October 1980 with the NSL Championship final, where Toronto Panhellenic defeated St. Catharines Roma. The Toronto Falcons won the regular-season title but were defeated by Toronto Italia for the NSL Cup.

The NSL was operative in the United States and Northern Ontario for the final time in the league's history.

== Overview ==
The decade ushered in a unique era in Canadian soccer as many attempts and proposals at forming a national major soccer league were executed throughout the 1980s. The first notable example occurred in 1980 when several investors presented a nationwide soccer league known as the Canadian Soccer League (CSL) to debut in 1981. Before the commencement of any season, the project initially debuted in a tournament known as the Red Leaf Cup, which featured teams from Europe and Brazil. The planned Canadian Soccer League failed to materialize, and the next attempt at creating a domestic national league successfully occurred in 1983.

Meanwhile, the Ontario-centered National Soccer League (NSL) continued having a presence in Northern Ontario with Sudbury Cyclones representing the city of Sudbury, and an American representative from Upstate New York known as the Buffalo Blazers. The membership in the league decreased to twelve clubs as the NSL lost its presence in Quebec and Detroit, Michigan, as the Montreal Stars, Detroit Besa, and Detroit Vardar departed. The Hamilton Italo-Canadians requested a sabbatical and returned for the 1981 season. Buffalo was denied participation in the playoffs because of financial and player issues.

A friendly tournament known as the Toronto International Soccer Cup was organized with Toronto First Portuguese and Toronto Panhellenic representing the NSL against S.L. Benfica and Partizan Belgrade. Benfica would win the tournament after defeating Partizan in the final.

=== Teams ===
Team	City	Stadium	Manager
Buffalo Blazers	Buffalo, New York	Lackwanna Stadium	Carlo Del Monte
Bradford Marshlanders	Bradford, Ontario	Bradford Community Centre	Dave Reid
London City	London, Ontario	Cove Road Stadium	
Serbian White Eagles	Toronto, Ontario	Lamport Stadium	Nikola Ivetić
Sudbury Cyclones	Sudbury, Ontario	Queen's Athletic Field	Gino Pacitto
St. Catharines Roma	St. Catharines, Ontario	Club Roma Stadium	
Toronto Croatia	Toronto, Ontario	Lamport Stadium	
Toronto Falcons	Toronto, Ontario	Lamport Stadium	
Toronto First Portuguese	Toronto, Ontario	Lamport Stadium	José Testas
Toronto Italia	Toronto, Ontario	Lamport Stadium	Fiorigi Pagliuso
Toronto Panhellenic	Toronto, Ontario	Lamport Stadium	Arthur Rodrigues
Toronto Ukrainians	Etobicoke, Ontario	Centennial Park Stadium	

Location of NSL teams outside of Toronto for the 1980 NSL season.

Location of NSL teams in Toronto for the 1980 NSL season.

== Final standings ==
Pos	Team	Pld	W	D	L	GF	GA	GD	Pts	Qualification
1	Toronto Falcons (C)	22	18	3	1	45	14	+31	39	Qualification for Playoffs
2	Toronto First Portuguese	22	16	5	1	71	15	+56	37	Qualification for Playoffs
3	Toronto Italia	22	14	6	2	63	16	+47	34	Qualification for Playoffs
4	Toronto Panhellenic (O)	22	11	9	2	38	14	+24	31	Qualification for Playoffs
5	London City	22	11	3	8	49	25	+24	25	Qualification for Playoffs
6	St. Catharines Roma	22	8	4	10	29	26	+3	20	Qualification for Playoffs
7	Bradford Marshlanders	22	7	5	10	31	58	−27	19	Qualification for Playoffs
8	Buffalo Blazers	22	8	2	12	33	49	−16	18	Ineligible for Playoffs (Note: Buffalo Blazers failed to meet the necessary requirements to compete in the playoffs)
9	Toronto Ukrainians	22	5	3	14	22	56	−34	13	Qualification for Playoffs
10	Sudbury Cyclones	22	3	6	13	27	40	−13	12	
11	Toronto Croatia	22	4	3	15	21	55	−34	11	
12	Serbian White Eagles	22	1	3	18	14	75	−61	5	

Updated to match(es) played on September 30, 1980. Source:
Rules for classification: 1) points; 2) goal difference; 3) number of goals scored.
(C) Champions; (O) Play-off winners

== Playoffs ==
=== Finals ===
October 6, 1980	Toronto Panhellenic	1–0	St. Catharines Roma	Toronto, Ontario
	John Stravropoulos	[ Report]		Stadium: Lamport Stadium

== Cup ==
The cup tournament was a separate contest from the rest of the season, in which all twelve teams took part. All the matches were separate from the regular season, and the teams were grouped into two separate divisions. The two winners in the group stage would advance to a two-legged match final for the Cup.

=== Finals ===
September 3, 1980	Toronto Italia	2–0	Toronto Falcons	Toronto, Ontario
		[ Report]		Stadium: Lamport Stadium

September 7, 1980	Toronto Falcons	0–2	Toronto Italia	Toronto, Ontario
		[ Report]	Mike Burke 37', 60'	Stadium: Lamport Stadium
