= 1977 National Soccer League (Canada) season =

National Soccer League
- Season: 1977
- Champions: Montreal Castors (1st title)
- League cup: Toronto Panhellenic
- Top goalscorer: Saban Romanovic
- Best goalkeeper: Paolo Cimpiel

The 1977 National Soccer League season was the fifty-fourth season under the National Soccer League (NSL) name. The season began in late April and concluded in early October, with the Montreal Castors securing the double (First Division title and NSL Championship) by finishing first in the First Division. The NSL Cup was claimed by Toronto Panhellenic. The Second Division title was won by Toronto Falcons by finishing first in the standings, which allowed promotion to the First Division. The NSL was operative in Northern Ontario and Quebec and had a franchise in Upstate New York in the United States.

== Overview ==
The National Soccer League (NSL) had intentions of expanding westward with the idea of forming a division in British Columbia. Though the idea never materialized, the NSL would ultimately establish an affiliated league in British Columbia with the Pacific Rim Soccer League in the 1986 season. Several changes were approved by the league owners to limit the usage of imports by placing a further restriction on foreign players from five to four. As the league attempted to curb the usage of imports, it approved the requirement of every First Division club to field a feeder team in the NSL's youth division. The season produced several controversies as multiple riots and fan violence erupted throughout matches, which were primarily fueled by ethnic rivalries amongst the ethnically associated clubs. One particular match that produced a riot occurred between Toronto Italia and Toronto Panhellenic supporters, which caused Italia to contemplate leaving the league before reconsidering.

The membership in the league increased to 20 teams with 10 members in both divisions. Hamilton Italo-Canadians and Toronto Croatia were promoted to the First Division, while Hamilton Croatia and Welland Lions departed from the league. St. Catharines Roma, with experience in the Inter-City Soccer League, purchased Welland's franchise rights, and Toronto Hungaria returned and became based in Mississauga, Ontario. The NSL expanded further into Montreal with the acceptance of the Montreal Stars and the addition of the Bradford Marshlanders, with both clubs operating in the Second Division. Reports were also circulating about the league employing a potential commissioner with Toronto attorney Joe Kane as the primary candidate. Kane served as the league's legal advisor and assisted in drafting the league's new constitution the previous year.

== Teams ==
Team	City	Stadium	Manager
Bradford Marshlanders	Bradford, Ontario	Bradford District High School	Elio Radocchia
Buffalo Blazers	Buffalo, New York	War Memorial Stadium	Alex Crawley
Hamilton Italo-Canadians	Hamilton, Ontario	Ivor Wynne Stadium	
London City	London, Ontario	Cove Road Stadium	Ron Clayton
Mississauga Hungaria	Mississauga, Ontario	Corn Starch Stadium	Andy Birk
Montreal Castors	Montreal, Quebec	Complexe sportif Claude-Robillard	Hugo Nicolini
Montreal Stars	Montreal, Quebec	Jarry Park	
Ottawa Tigers	Ottawa, Ontario	Lansdowne Park	Mario Carilli
Serbian White Eagles	Toronto, Ontario	Lamport Stadium	Luis Dabo
Sudbury Cyclones	Sudbury, Ontario	Queen's Athletic Field	Peter Severinac
St. Catharines Heidelberg	St. Catharines, Ontario	Heidelberg Stadium	Frank McArdia
St. Catharines Roma	St. Catharines, Ontario	Club Roma Stadium	
Toronto Croatia	Etobicoke, Ontario	Lamport Stadium	
Toronto Falcons	Toronto, Ontario	Lamport Stadium	Kazimierz Drugalski
Toronto First Portuguese	Toronto, Ontario	Lamport Stadium	
Toronto Italia	York, Ontario	York Stadium	Fiorigi Pagliuso
Toronto Macedonia	Toronto, Ontario	Lamport Stadium	Carlo Del Monte
Toronto Panhellenic	Toronto, Ontario	Lamport Stadium	
Toronto Polonia	Toronto, Ontario	Lamport Stadium	
Windsor Stars	Windsor, Ontario	Mic Mac Park Windsor Stadium	Jim Townsend

=== Coaching changes ===
Team	Outgoing coach	Manner of departure	Date of vacancy	Position in table	Incoming coach	Date of appointment
Windsor Stars	(Socialist Federal Republic of Yugoslavia) Ivan Marković	resigned	April 12, 1977	preseason	(Scotland) Jim Townsend	April 14, 1977
Sudbury Cyclones	Fulvio Stepancich	resigned	May 26, 1977	8th in May	(Socialist Federal Republic of Yugoslavia) Branko Knezevich	May 28, 1977
Sudbury Cyclones	(Socialist Federal Republic of Yugoslavia) Branko Knezevich	replaced	June 11, 1977	8th in May	Fulvio Stepancich	June 11, 1977
Bradford Marshlanders	Derek Nash John Rowley	replaced	July 13, 1977	4th in July	Elio Radocchia	July 13, 1977
Sudbury Cyclones	Fulvio Stepancich	fired	August 8, 1977	7th in August	Peter Severinac	August 8, 1977

Location of NSL teams outside of Toronto for the 1977 NSL season.

Locations of teams in Quebec for the 1977 NSL season.

== Standings ==
=== First Division ===
Pos	Team	Pld	W	D	L	GF	GA	GD	Pts	Qualification
1	Montreal Castors (C, O)	36	24	8	4	93	56	+37	56	Qualification for Playoffs
2	Toronto Italia	36	22	10	4	74	22	+52	54	
3	Toronto Panhellenic	36	21	7	8	74	47	+27	49	
4	Windsor Stars	36	20	6	10	87	38	+49	46	
5	Toronto First Portuguese	36	17	9	10	72	43	+29	43	
6	London City	36	9	13	14	41	62	−21	31	
7	Toronto Macedonia	36	12	6	18	40	56	−16	30	
8	Hamilton Italo-Canadians	36	7	10	19	40	60	−20	24	
9	Toronto Croatia	36	7	6	23	34	78	−44	20	
10	Serbian White Eagles (R)	36	0	7	29	24	137	−113	7	

Updated to match(es) played on September 30, 1977. Source: http://canadiansoccerleague.ca/wp-content/uploads/2014/06/NSL_1921_1992.pdf
Rules for classification: 1) points; 2) goal difference; 3) number of goals scored.
(C) Champions; (O) Play-off winners; (R) Relegated

=== Second Division ===
Pos	Team	Pld	W	D	L	GF	GA	GD	Pts	Qualification
1	Toronto Falcons (C, O, P)	18	15	2	1	48	10	+38	32	Qualification for Playoffs
2	Ottawa Tigers	18	14	1	3	66	17	+49	29	
3	Buffalo Blazers	18	12	3	3	50	13	+37	27	
4	Montreal Stars	18	11	2	5	53	23	+30	24	
5	St. Catharines Roma	18	8	4	6	38	25	+13	20	
6	Sudbury Cyclones	18	6	4	8	28	35	−7	16	
7	St. Catharines Heidelberg	18	4	4	10	22	35	−13	12	
8	Mississauga Hungaria	18	3	3	12	33	71	−38	9	
9	Toronto Polonia	18	2	3	13	25	65	−40	7	
10	Bradford Marshlanders	18	1	2	15	13	82	−69	4	

Updated to match(es) played on September 30, 1977. Source: http://canadiansoccerleague.ca/wp-content/uploads/2014/06/NSL_1921_1992.pdf
Rules for classification: 1) points; 2) goal difference; 3) number of goals scored.
(C) Champions; (O) Play-off winners; (P) Promoted

== Promotion and relegation matches ==
The promotion and relegation system utilized by the National Soccer League operated with the last-placed team in the First Division being automatically relegated, while the Second Division champion would receive an automatic promotion to the First Division. The second last team in the First Division would play in a series of matches against the runner-ups in the Second Division to determine which team would be relegated or promoted.

=== Matches ===
October 2, 1977	Toronto Croatia	3–1	Ottawa Tigers	Toronto, Ontario
	Dennis D'Hugo, Loparić	[ Report]	Henderson	Stadium: Lamport Stadium

October 10, 1977	Ottawa Tigers	1–1	Toronto Croatia	Ottawa, Ontario
15:00	Mick Wharton	[ Report]	Bill McGill	Stadium: Mooney's Bay
