= 1973 National Soccer League season =

National Soccer League
- Season: 1973
- Champions: Toronto Croatia (regular season, 4th title); Toronto Hungaria (playoffs, 1st title)
- League cup: Toronto Hungaria
- Top goalscorer: John Fahy (24); Keith Summers (24)
- Best goalkeeper: Blagoje Tamindžić

The 1973 National Soccer League season was the fiftieth season under the National Soccer League (NSL) name. The season began in May and concluded in late October with Toronto Hungaria defeating Toronto Croatia for the NSL Championship. Toronto Hungaria repeated their success by defeating Croatia for the NSL Cup, which marked the organization's first league double. Although Toronto Croatia was defeated in the postseason, they still managed to secure the regular-season title and qualified for the Canadian Open Cup. In the Canadian Open Cup final, Toronto successfully defended the title for the third consecutive season by defeating Challenge Trophy finalists Toronto West Indies United.

Toronto Croatia was scheduled to participate in the 1973 CONCACAF Champions' Cup against Club América, but the series of matches failed to materialize. Stanley Park Stadium was employed for the final time as the Toronto clubs transferred their home venue to the CNE Stadium in 1974. The league experienced a further increase in match attendance.

== Overview ==
The National Soccer League (NSL) was embroiled in a dispute with the Toronto Indoor Soccer League over the usage of players during the offseason. The NSL teams forbade their contracted players from participating in the indoor league without the consent of their clubs. Despite the ban, many NSL players ignored the decision and continued playing in the indoor league. The league increased in membership to 17 teams with the approval of additional teams in Toronto and Montreal. The NSL expanded into Quebec with the return of Montreal Cantalia, and the Toronto representatives were Toronto Melita and Toronto Polonia. Melita previously competed in the Toronto & District Soccer League.

Several teams were rebranded, with Hamilton Apollos becoming Hamilton City, and Toronto Olympia was renamed Toronto Homer. London City acquired the NSL franchise rights from London German Canadians, and Toronto Hellas had its franchise revoked. The league had an increase in match attendance, with Serbian White Eagles and Toronto Croatia averaging the most. The season also marked the final time the Toronto-based clubs would utilize Stanley Park Stadium as their home venue, as the municipal government decided to convert the field into a park. The league administration addressed the continuing fan violence throughout the NSL with league president Joe Piccininni committing to placing stiffer fines the following season. The league table was modified after the Ottawa Tigers were suspended in late August after incurring financial problems.

== Teams ==
| Team | City | Stadium | Manager |
|---|---|---|---|
| Hamilton City | Hamilton, Ontario | Brian Timmis Stadium | Jackie Thoms |
| Hamilton Croatia | Hamilton, Ontario | Brian Timmis Stadium Ivor Wynne Stadium | Sid Sokles |
| Hamilton Italo-Canadians | Hamilton, Ontario | Brain Timmis Stadium | John Paolis |
| London City | London, Ontario | Cove Road Stadium | |
| Montreal Cantalia | Montreal, Quebec | Verdun Stadium | Franco Gallina |
| Ottawa Tigers (Note: Ottawa withdrew from league midway through the season) | Ottawa, Ontario | Mooney's Bay Sports Complex | Sandro Rausa |
| Serbian White Eagles | Toronto, Ontario | CNE Stadium Stanley Park Stadium | Mladen Sarić |
| Srbija Kitchener | Kitchener, Ontario | | |
| St. Catharines Heidelberg | St. Catharines, Ontario | Club Heidelberg Field | Alex Crawley |
| Toronto Croatia | Toronto, Ontario | CNE Stadium Stanley Park Stadium | Vladimir Šimunić |
| Toronto First Portuguese | Toronto, Ontario | CNE Stadium Stanley Park Stadium | Enidio Graca |
| Toronto Homer | Toronto, Ontario | CNE Stadium Stanley Park Stadium | |
| Toronto Hungaria | Toronto, Ontario | CNE Stadium Stanley Park Stadium | |
| Toronto Italia | York, Ontario | York Stadium | Giovanni Fanello |
| Toronto Melita | Toronto, Ontario | CNE Stadium Stanley Park Stadium | |
| Toronto Polonia | Toronto, Ontario | CNE Stadium Stanley Park Stadium | |
| Toronto Ukrainians | Toronto, Ontario | CNE Stadium Stanley Park Stadium | |

=== Coaching changes ===
| Team | Outgoing coach | Manner of departure | Date of vacancy | Position in table | Incoming coach | Date of appointment |
|---|---|---|---|---|---|---|
| Montreal Cantalia | Ricardo Musci | replaced | July, 1973 | | Franco Gallina | July, 1973 |
| Toronto Italia | Hector Marinaro, Sr. | replaced | July, 1973 | | Giovanni Fanello | July, 1973 |
| St. Catharines Heidelberg | John Santesso | replaced | August 25, 1973 | 1st | Alex Crawley | August 25, 1973 |
| Hamilton Croatia | Kruno Gjuric | replaced | September, 1973 | | Sid Sokles | September, 1973 |

Location of NSL teams outside of Toronto for the 1973 NSL season.

Locations of teams in Quebec for the 1973 NSL season.

== Standings ==
| Pos | Team | Pld | W | D | L | GF | GA | GD | Pts | Qualification |
|---|---|---|---|---|---|---|---|---|---|---|
| 1 | Toronto Croatia (C) | 30 | 22 | 4 | 4 | 71 | 23 | +48 | 48 | Qualification for Playoffs |
| 2 | Serbian White Eagles | 30 | 22 | 1 | 7 | 66 | 21 | +45 | 45 | Qualification for Playoffs |
| 3 | Toronto First Portuguese | 30 | 17 | 8 | 5 | 52 | 33 | +19 | 42 | Qualification for Playoffs |
| 4 | Toronto Hungaria (O) | 30 | 17 | 7 | 6 | 68 | 35 | +33 | 41 | Qualification for Playoffs |
| 5 | Toronto Italia | 30 | 16 | 5 | 9 | 55 | 37 | +18 | 37 | Qualification for Playoffs |
| 6 | Toronto Homer | 30 | 14 | 8 | 8 | 58 | 35 | +23 | 36 | Qualification for Playoffs |
| 7 | London City | 30 | 12 | 9 | 9 | 47 | 43 | +4 | 33 | Qualification for Playoffs |
| 8 | St. Catharines Heidelberg | 30 | 12 | 7 | 11 | 37 | 39 | −2 | 31 | Qualification for Playoffs |
| 9 | Hamilton Croatia | 30 | 10 | 9 | 11 | 55 | 53 | +2 | 29 | |
| 10 | Toronto Melita | 30 | 8 | 10 | 12 | 37 | 45 | −8 | 26 | |
| 11 | Toronto Ukrainians | 30 | 9 | 5 | 16 | 45 | 48 | −3 | 23 | |
| 12 | Hamilton City | 30 | 8 | 7 | 15 | 39 | 58 | −19 | 23 | |
| 13 | Montreal Cantalia | 30 | 8 | 7 | 15 | 39 | 58 | −19 | 23 | |
| 14 | Hamilton Italo-Canadians | 30 | 4 | 9 | 17 | 20 | 64 | −44 | 17 | |
| 15 | Srbija Kitchener | 30 | 4 | 5 | 21 | 29 | 77 | −48 | 13 | |
| 16 | Toronto Polonia | 30 | 5 | 3 | 22 | 30 | 83 | −53 | 13 | |

Updated to match(es) played on October 30, 1973. Source: http://canadiansoccerleague.ca/wp-content/uploads/2014/06/NSL_1921_1992.pdf
Rules for classification: 1) points; 2) goal difference; 3) number of goals scored.
(C) Champions; (O) Play-off winners

== Playoffs ==
=== Quarterfinals ===
| October 13, 1973 | Toronto Croatia | 2–1 | Toronto Italia | Toronto, Ontario |
| | Mirko Basic, | [ Report] | Carlos Jorge | Stadium: Stanley Park Stadium; Attendance: 871 |

| October 14, 1973 | Serbian White Eagles | 2–1 | Toronto Homer | Toronto, Ontario |
| | Stojanovic, | [ Report] | Peter Testepasis | Stadium: Stanley Park Stadium; Attendance: 1112; Referee: John Highet |

| October 14, 1973 | Toronto First Portuguese | 4–1 | London City | Toronto, Ontario |
| | | [ Report] | | Stadium: Stanley Park Stadium |

| October 15, 1973 | Toronto Hungaria | 2–1 | St. Catharines Heidelberg | Toronto, Ontario |
| | Fahy; Allan Callender | [ Report] | Daniel McIntosh | Stadium: Stanley Park Stadium |

=== Semifinals ===
| October 16, 1973 | Toronto Croatia | 2–1 | Toronto First Portuguese | Toronto, Ontario |
| 20:30 | Branko Trtanj; Solak | [ Report] | Emilio Hernandez | Stadium: Stanley Park Stadium; Attendance: 1500; Referee: Bob Hughes |

| October 17, 1973 | Toronto Hungaria | 2–1 | Serbian White Eagles | Toronto, Ontario |
| | Fahy, | [ Report] | Stojanovic | Stadium: Stanley Park Stadium |

=== Finals ===
| October 19, 1973 | Toronto Croatia | 1–2 | Toronto Hungaria | Toronto, Ontario |
| | Solak 93' | [ Report] | Allan Callender 2'; Molnar 7' | Stadium: Stanley Park Stadium; Attendance: 2313 |

== Cup ==
The cup tournament was a separate contest from the rest of the season in which all seventeen teams took part. The finals for the cup were to consist of a two-legged match, but were scrapped after the first match was abandoned due to fan violence. The league decided to award the cup to Toronto Hungaria as they were leading the match before it was abandoned.

=== Finals ===
| October 21, 1973 | Toronto Croatia | 1–3 | Toronto Hungaria | Toronto, Ontario |
| | Arslanovic | [ Report] | Mario Garcia, Polyviou | Stadium: Stanley Park Stadium; Attendance: 3341; Referee: Bill Divorski |

== Canadian Open Cup ==
The Canadian Open Cup was a tournament organized by the National Soccer League in 1971, where the NSL champion would face the Challenge Trophy winners to determine the best team throughout the country. The 1974 edition served as a qualifier match to determine the Canadian representative to the CONCACAF Champions' Cup. Toronto Croatia was the NSL representative for the third consecutive year, while their opponents were the Toronto & District League champions, Toronto West Indies United. The Vancouver Firefighters were the 1973 Challenge Trophy winners and originally were invited to participate, but declined, which allowed the Challenge Trophy runner-ups, Toronto West Indies United, to compete for the title.

| October 28, 1973 | Toronto Croatia | 3–1 | Toronto West Indies United | Toronto, Ontario |
| | Peric 5', 12', 70' | [ Report] | Clarence Prendes 25' | Stadium: Stanley Park Stadium; Attendance: 1103 |
