= 1978 National Soccer League (Canada) season =

National Soccer League
- Season: 1978
- Champions: Montreal Castors (regular season); Toronto Falcons (playoffs, 1st title)
- League cup: Toronto Falcons
- Top goalscorer: Sergio Clerici
- Best goalkeeper: Tony Dallas

The 1978 National Soccer League season was the fifty-fifth season under the National Soccer League (NSL) name. The season began in May 1978 and concluded in late September 1978 with the Toronto Falcons defeating Hamilton Italo-Canadians for the NSL Cup. The regular-season title and NSL Championship were successfully defended by the Montreal Castors by finishing first in the First Division. The Second Division title was won by St. Catharines Roma by finishing first in the standings.

The NSL was operative in Northern Ontario and Quebec and had a franchise in Upstate New York in the United States. The season also marked the final time the league employed the promotion and relegation system, as the Second Division was dissolved the following year.

== Overview ==
The membership in the First Division increased to 11 teams with Buffalo Blazers, Ottawa Tigers, and Toronto Falcons receiving promotions. Ottawa was defeated in the previous season's promotion and relegation match series by Toronto Croatia, but was still granted promotion to the First Division. The departing clubs were Toronto Macedonia, and the Serbian White Eagles were inactive for the season. Toronto Macedonia attempted to sell their franchise rights to Montreal Stars, but the move was declined by the league ownership.

A league meeting occurred in early September where the league ownership decided to eliminate the playoff format and conclude the season early after the completion of the NSL Cup tournament. The league champions, Montreal Castors, decided to withdraw from the competition, while the Windsor Stars forfeited after protesting the league's decision to change their opponent. The Second Division consisted of 7 teams with the Toronto Ukrainians returning to the NSL after a two-year absence. The Montreal Stars were absent for the season but returned for the 1979 season. Further changes occurred at the administrative level with John Fischer succeeding Joe Piccininni as the league's president.

== Teams ==
Team	City	Stadium	Manager
Bradford Marshlanders	Bradford, Ontario	Bradford High School	Dave Reid
Buffalo Blazers	Buffalo, New York Niagara Falls, New York	War Memorial Stadium; Hyde Park Stadium	Roberto Lonardo
Hamilton Italo-Canadians	Hamilton, Ontario	Ivor Wynne Stadium	Frank Donlavey
London City	London, Ontario	Cove Road Stadium	Graham Sawyer
Mississauga Hungaria	Mississauga, Ontario		
Montreal Castors	Montreal, Quebec	Complexe sportif Claude-Robillard	Tony Iammatteo
Ottawa Tigers	Ottawa, Ontario	Lansdowne Park	Tommy Henderson
Sudbury Cyclones	Sudbury, Ontario	Queen's Athletic Field	Jim Thomson
St. Catharines Heidelberg	St. Catharines, Ontario		
St. Catharines Roma	St. Catharines, Ontario	Club Roma Stadium	
Toronto Croatia	Etobicoke, Ontario	Centennial Park Stadium	Bruno Pilaš
Toronto Falcons	Toronto, Ontario	Lamport Stadium	Wacław Sąsiadek
Toronto First Portuguese	Toronto, Ontario	Lamport Stadium	Assis Viola
Toronto Italia	York, Ontario	York Stadium	Fiorigi Pagliuso
Toronto Panhellenic	Toronto, Ontario	Lamport Stadium	
Toronto Polonia	Toronto, Ontario	Lamport Stadium	
Toronto Ukrainians	Etobicoke, Ontario	Centennial Park Stadium	
Windsor Stars	Windsor, Ontario	Windsor Stadium	Pedro Da Silva

=== Coaching changes ===
Team	Outgoing coach	Manner of departure	Date of vacancy	Position in table	Incoming coach	Date of appointment
Buffalo Blazers	Sam Buscarino	resigned	April 23, 1978	11th in June	Roberto Lonardo	June, 1978

Location of NSL teams outside of Toronto for the 1978 NSL season.

Locations of teams in Quebec for the 1978 NSL season.

== Standings ==
=== First Division ===
Pos	Team	Pld	W	D	L	GF	GA	GD	Pts	Qualification
1	Montreal Castors (C, O)	20	15	3	2	55	22	+33	33	Qualification for Playoffs
2	Toronto First Portuguese	20	10	9	1	34	15	+19	29	
3	Toronto Falcons	20	10	5	5	26	23	+3	25	
4	Toronto Panhellenic	20	9	6	5	37	28	+9	24	
5	Toronto Italia	20	9	5	6	31	19	+12	23	
6	Windsor Stars	20	7	9	4	34	26	+8	23	
7	Ottawa Tigers	20	6	6	8	40	38	+2	18	
8	Hamilton Italo-Canadians	19	5	4	10	31	32	−1	14	
9	Toronto Croatia	19	5	1	13	15	47	−32	11	
10	London City	20	3	3	14	16	39	−23	9	
11	Buffalo Blazers	20	3	3	14	26	56	−30	9	

Updated to match(es) played on September 30, 1978. Source: http://canadiansoccerleague.ca/wp-content/uploads/2014/06/NSL_1921_1992.pdf
Rules for classification: 1) points; 2) goal difference; 3) number of goals scored.
(C) Champions; (O) Play-off winners

=== Second Division ===
Pos	Team	Pld	W	D	L	GF	GA	GD	Pts	Qualification
1	St. Catharines Roma (C, O)	12	10	2	0	35	7	+28	22	Qualification for Playoffs
2	St. Catharines Heidelberg	12	9	0	3	37	12	+25	18	
3	Sudbury Cyclones	12	6	2	4	20	11	+9	14	
4	Toronto Polonia	12	5	3	4	25	18	+7	13	
5	Toronto Ukrainians	12	4	2	6	19	26	−7	10	
6	Mississauga Hungaria	12	3	0	9	13	33	−20	6	
7	Bradford Marshlanders	12	0	1	11	8	50	−42	1	

Updated to match(es) played on September 30, 1978. Source: http://canadiansoccerleague.ca/wp-content/uploads/2014/06/NSL_1921_1992.pdf
Rules for classification: 1) points; 2) goal difference; 3) number of goals scored.
(C) Champions; (O) Play-off winners
