= 1981 National Soccer League (Canada) season =

National Soccer League
- Season: 1981
- Champions: Hamilton Steelers (regular season); Hamilton Steelers (playoffs, 1st title)
- League cup: Hamilton Steelers
- Top goalscorer: Rennie Phillips (18)

The 1981 National Soccer League season was the fifty-eighth season under the National Soccer League (NSL) name. The season began in May 1981 and concluded in October 1981 with the NSL Championship final, where Hamilton Steelers defeated Toronto Italia in a two-legged series final. Hamilton would achieve a treble by also securing the regular-season title and defeating Toronto Ukrainians for the NSL Cup.

== Overview ==
News of a potential Canadian national soccer league was confirmed when the Canadian Soccer Association (CSA) officially sanctioned a proposal from a group known as Sports Professionals International Inc. Meanwhile, on the National Soccer League (NSL) front, the office of the league commissioner was established with league secretary Job Jones serving as the inaugural officeholder. A Canadianization policy was adopted by the league owners in an attempt to limit the ethnically associated clubs. The membership in the league remained identical to the previous season with the Serbian White Eagles, and Sudbury Cyclones departing. The league retained its American representative with Detroit Besa returning and replacing the Buffalo Blazers.

The Hamilton Italo-Canadians returned under the name Hamilton Steelers. Toronto Italia participated in the Toronto International Soccer Tournament against Barcelona S.C., S.L. Benfica, and Leeds United F.C.

=== Teams ===
Team	City	Stadium	Manager
Bradford Marshlanders	Bradford, Ontario	Bradford Community Centre	Tommy Henderson
Detroit Besa	Detroit, Michigan	Keyworth Stadium	Nino Berisic
Hamilton Steelers	Hamilton, Ontario	Brian Timmis Stadium	Carlo Del Monte
London City	London, Ontario	Cove Road Stadium	
St. Catharines Roma	St. Catharines, Ontario	Club Roma Stadium	
Toronto Croatia	Etobicoke, Ontario	Centennial Park Stadium	
Toronto Falcons	Toronto, Ontario	Lamport Stadium	
Toronto First Portuguese	Toronto, Ontario	Lamport Stadium	Bernardo da Velha
Toronto Italia	Etobicoke, Ontario	Centennial Park Stadium	Fiorigi Pagliuso
Toronto Panhellenic	Toronto, Ontario	Lamport Stadium	Germán Sánchez
Toronto Ukrainians	Etobicoke, Ontario	Centennial Park Stadium	

==== Coaching changes ====
Team	Outgoing coach	Manner of departure	Date of vacancy	Position in table	Incoming coach	Date of appointment
Bradford Marshlanders	Dave Reid	replaced	may 20, 1981	preseason	Tommy Henderson	May 20, 1981
Toronto First Portuguese	Ralph Pisani	replaced	July 18, 1981	10th in July	(Portugal) Bernardo da Velha	July 18, 1981

Location of NSL teams outside of Toronto for the 1981 NSL season.

Location of NSL teams in Toronto for the 1981 NSL season.

== Final standings ==
Pos	Team	Pld	W	D	L	GF	GA	GD	Pts	Qualification
1	Hamilton Steelers (C, O)	20	16	1	3	55	14	+41	33	Qualification for Playoffs
2	Toronto Panhellenic	20	12	3	5	38	21	+17	27	Qualification for Playoffs
3	Toronto Italia	20	11	5	4	43	25	+18	27	Qualification for Playoffs
4	Toronto Falcons	20	7	10	3	32	28	+4	24	Qualification for Playoffs
5	Toronto Croatia	20	8	7	5	30	22	+8	23	Qualification for Playoffs
6	St. Catharines Roma	20	8	6	6	30	27	+3	22	Qualification for Playoffs
7	London City	20	4	8	8	25	28	−3	16	Qualification for Playoffs
8	Detroit Besa	20	7	2	11	25	39	−14	16	Qualification for Playoffs
9	Toronto First Portuguese	20	4	7	9	22	28	−6	15	
10	Bradford Marshlanders	20	1	7	12	20	49	−29	9	
11	Toronto Ukrainians	20	2	4	14	15	30	−15	8	

Updated to match(es) played on September 30, 1981. Source:
Rules for classification: 1) points; 2) goal difference; 3) number of goals scored.
(C) Champions; (O) Play-off winners
