= Jimmy Douglas (Canadian soccer) =

Scottish-Canadian soccer player

Personal information
- Full name: James Douglas
- Date of birth: 6 October 1948 (age 78)
- Place of birth: Falkirk, Scotland
- Position: Midfielder

Youth career
- 1966–: St. Catharines Heidelberg

Senior career*
Years	Team	Apps	(Gls)
1972–1973	St. Catharines Heidelberg		
1974	Toronto Metros	11	(0)
1975	St. Catharines Heidelberg		
1976	Hamilton Croatia		
1977	Toronto First Portuguese		
1978	St. Catharines Roma Wolves		

International career
1972–1976	Canada	13	(1)

Managerial career
- St. Catharines Roma Wolves
- * Club domestic league appearances and goals

Jimmy Douglas (born 6 October 1948 in Falkirk, Scotland) is a former Scottish-Canadian soccer midfielder and head coach. He played professionally in the North American Soccer League and earned fourteen caps for the Canadian national soccer team.

== Club career ==
Born in Scotland, Douglas moved to Canada in 1964 when he was sixteen. He almost immediately began playing for St. Catharines Heidelberg in the National Soccer League and by 1972 was in the first team. In 1974, he played in the North American Soccer League with the Toronto Metros before returning to St. Catharines Heidelberg for one season and Hamilton Croatia also for one season. In 1977, he played with league rivals Toronto First Portuguese.

He signed with St. Catharines Roma for the 1978 season, and was named the team's captain. He later became coach of St. Catharines Roma Wolves, serving as general manager in at least 2002 and 2003.

In 2002, he was inducted into the St. Catharines Sports Hall of Fame.

== International career ==
Douglas was one of Canada's most talented midfield players. He played 13 'A' internationals including with the World Cup teams of 1972 and 1976 which failed to qualify for their respective finals. Douglas played another ten games with the Canadian Olympic soccer team. He was captain of the Canadian team during the final rounds of the 1976 Olympics, attracting international attention when he scored Canada's goal in the dying minutes of the game against the Soviet Union. He also scored Canada's goal in a 1–3 loss to North Korea, which eliminated the Canadians. Douglas also was a member of the Canadian squad at the 1975 Pan American Games.

=== International goals ===
Scores and results list Canada's goal tally first.

#	Date	Venue	Opponent	Score	Result	Competition
1	29 August 1972	Memorial Stadium, Baltimore, United States	United States	2–2	2–2	1974 FIFA World Cup qualification

In April 2001 Douglas was inducted into the Canadian Soccer Hall of Fame.
