= Micmac =

Micmac, Micmacs, or Mic Mac can refer to:

== Mi'kmaq people ==
- Mi'kmaq people, Native people of the Southeastern Woodlands of Canada, formerly spelt Micmac
  - Mi'kmaq language
  - Mi'kmaq hieroglyphic writing

== Places in Canada ==
- Lake Micmac near Halifax, Nova Scotia
  - Micmac ParClo, partial cloverleaf at Lake Micmac, formerly Micmac Rotary
- Mic Mac Mall in Dartmouth, Nova Scotia
- Mic Mac AAC, Amateur Aquatic Club in Dartmouth, Nova Scotia
- Mic Mac Park in Windsor, Ontario

== Other uses ==
- Chatham MicMacs, former name of the Chatham Maroons Canadian junior ice hockey team
- HMCS Micmac (R10), former Canadian destroyer
- Micmac, a now defunct series of fashion shops founded by playboy Gunter Sachs
- Mic Mac (brand), a defunct Finnish brand of jeans
- MicMac (software), an open-source photogrammetry suite
- Micmac Air Services, operating company of Conne River Water Aerodrome in Newfoundland, Canada
- MicMac Online, former name of MMPORG Asda Story
- Micmac War (or Anglo-Micmac War), more obscurely referred to as "Father Le Loutre's War"
- Micmacs (film), a 2009 French film
- Neoseiulus micmac, a species of mite

== See also ==
- Mi'kmaq (disambiguation), relating to a Canadian First Nations people
