= Francesco Curatoli =

Italian footballer

Personal information
- Date of birth: 22 January 1946 (age 80)
- Place of birth: Naples, Kingdom of Italy
- Position: Midfielder

Senior career*
Years	Team	Apps	(Gls)
1965–1966	Salernitana	5	(0)
1967–1968	Monza	12	(0)
1968–1970	Bari	5	(1)
1970	Derthona	32	(0)
1971	Savoia	28	(0)
1973	Montreal Cantalia		
- * Club domestic league appearances and goals

Francesco Curatoli (born 22 January 1946) is an Italian former footballer who played as a midfielder.

== Career ==
Curatoli played in the Serie C in 1965 with U.S. Salernitana 1919. In 1967, he played in Serie B with A.C. Monza, and the following season he signed with S.S.C. Bari. In 1969, he played in the Serie A when Bari secured promotion to the top flight. He returned to Serie C to play with A.S.D. HSL Derthona in 1970, and the next season he played with U.S. Savoia 1908. In 1973, he played in the National Soccer League with Montreal Cantalia.
