= Hugo Nicolini =

Argentine footballer

Personal information
- Date of birth: 15 November 1949 (age 76)
- Place of birth: Buenos Aires, Argentina
- Position: Defender

Senior career*
| Years | Team | Apps | (Gls) |
| 1972–1975 | Toronto Italia | | |
| 1976–1977 | Montreal Castors | | |
| 1978 | Ottawa Tigers | | |
| 1978 | Rochester Lancers | 24 | (1) |
| 1981 | Toronto Panhellenic | | |
| 1982 | Toronto Italia | | |
| 1983 | Hamilton Steelers | | |

Managerial career
- 1977: Montreal Castors
- * Club domestic league appearances and goals

Hugo Nicolini (born November 15, 1949) is an Argentinian former footballer who played as a defender most notably in the North American Soccer League.

== Career ==
Nicolini played professional football in his native Argentina, and in 1972 played abroad in the National Soccer League with Toronto Italia. In 1976, he played with league rivals the Montreal Castors. Throughout his two-year tenure with Montreal, he was named to the NSL All-Star team. In late 1977, Nicolini, along with six Montreal players were traded to the Ottawa Tigers in order to assist in their playoff match against Toronto Croatia to gain promotion to the NSL First Division. The transaction provided Montreal with the bargaining rights to Mick Jones.

In 1978, he signed with the Rochester Lancers of the North American Soccer League. He recorded his first goal for Rochester on July 15, 1978, against the New England Tea Men. In his debut season with Rochester, he appeared in 24 matches and recorded 1 goal. The following season, Rochester didn't re-sign Nicolini for the 1979 season. In 1981, he returned to the National Soccer League to play with Toronto Panhellenic. In 1982, he returned to his former club, Toronto Italia. In 1983, he played in the Canadian Professional Soccer League with the Hamilton Steelers.

== Managerial career ==
Nicolini served as the player-coach for the Montreal Castors in the National Soccer League for the 1977 season.
