= Toronto Falcons =

Toronto Falcons may refer to:

- Toronto Falcons (1967–1968), a former Canadian soccer team that played in the National Professional Soccer League and the North American Soccer League
- Toronto Falcons (1975–1982), a former Canadian soccer team that played in the National Soccer League
- Toronto Falcons (2022–present), a Canadian soccer team that plays in the Canadian Soccer League
- Toronto Ravinas, a former minor league ice hockey team, which was previously named Toronto Falcons
