= Alexander Band =

The term Alexander Band or Alexander band might refer to:

- Alex Band, American musician (born 1981)
- Alexander's band, a phenomenon related to rainbows
- Alexander's Ragtime Band, a 1911 march song by Tin Pan Alley

== See also ==
- Alexander Bandl
