= Wacław Sąsiadek =

Polish footballer

Personal information
- Date of birth: 4 March 1931
- Place of birth: Lwów, Poland
- Date of death: 2 October 2017 (aged 86)
- Place of death: Bytom, Poland
- Height: 1.63 m (5 ft 4 in)
- Position: Forward

Youth career
- Pogoń Katowice

Senior career*
Years	Team	Apps	(Gls)
1946–1949	Pogoń Katowice		
1949–1953	Legia Warsaw	86	(34)
1954–1959	Polonia Bytom	102	(27)
1960–1961	Silesia Miechowice		

International career
1948–1950	Poland U18	3	(0)
1948–1954	Poland	3	(0)

Managerial career
- 1968–1969: Urania Ruda Śląska
- 1969–1973: CKS Czeladź
- 1973–1976: Urania Ruda Śląska
- 1977: GKS Tychy
- 1978: Toronto Falcons
- 1978: Wisłoka Dębica
- 1979–1980: Wisłoka Dębica
- 1980–1981: Polonia Bytom
- 1981–1985: Urania Ruda Śląska
- * Club domestic league appearances and goals

Wacław Sąsiadek (4 March 1931 – 2 October 2017) was a Polish footballer who played as a forward. He also played for the Poland national team, and was a manager.

== Club career ==
Sąsiadek began playing at the youth level with Pogoń Katowice, and ultimately joined the senior team in 1946. In 1949, he played in Liga Polska with Legia Warsaw where he played for five seasons. In 1954, he signed with Polonia Bytom where in his debut season he assisted in securing the Polish championship. He concluded his career in the 1960-61 season with Silesia Miechowice after sustaining a knee injury.

== International career ==
He made his debut for the Poland national football team on October 17, 1948, in a friendly match against Finland. In the match he made history as he became the youngest player to represent Poland at the age of 17 until broken by Włodzimierz Lubański. He later made two additional appearances for the senior national team against Albania, and East Germany. He also played for the Poland national under-18 football team.

== Managerial career ==
Sąsiadek became the football manager for Urania Ruda Śląska originally in 1968, he would return for another two stints with the club in 1973–76, and in 1981–85. He also managed CKS Czeladź, GKS Tychy, Wisłoka Dębica, and former club Polonia Bytom. In 1978, he managed abroad in the National Soccer League with the Toronto Falcons where he secured the NSL Cup against Hamilton Italo-Canadians.

== Personal life ==
He died on 2 October 2017.

== Honours ==
=== Player ===
Polonia Bytom

- Ekstraklasa: 1954

=== Manager ===
Toronto Falcons

- NSL Cup: 1978
