= Kenneth MacDonald =

Kenneth, Kenny, or Ken MacDonald (or McDonald) or Ken Macdonald may refer to:

== Arts ==
- Kenneth MacDonald (English actor) (1950–2001), "Mike" in "Only Fools And Horses" and "It Ain't Half Hot Mum"
- Kenneth MacDonald (American actor) (1901–1972), American film and TV actor
- Kenneth MacDonald (dancer) (1948–1995), dancer, Associate Artistic Director of the Des Moines Ballet

== Government ==
- K. C. MacDonald (Kenneth Cattanach MacDonald, 1872–1945), Canadian politician
- Ken Macdonald (born 1953), Baron Macdonald, British lawyer and politician
- Ken McDonald (politician) (born 1959), Liberal member of parliament, Newfoundland and Labrador
- Sir Kenneth Macdonald (civil servant) (1930–2025), British civil servant and businessman

== Sports ==
- Kenny MacDonald (shinty player) (born 1965), shinty goalkeeper for Kyles Athletic
- Kenny MacDonald (footballer) (born 1961), Scottish footballer
- Ken MacDonald (cricketer) (1934–1999), Australian cricketer
- Ken MacDonald (footballer) (1898–?), Welsh footballer
- Ken McDonald (basketball) (born 1970), former basketball coach at Western Kentucky University
- Ken McDonald (soccer) (born 1957), American soccer player
- Ken McDonald (footballer) (born 1945), Scottish footballer
- Ken McDonald (weightlifter) (1928–2015), Australian and English weightlifter
- Kenneth R. MacDonald (1935–2022), Canadian judge and curler

== Others ==
- Kenneth C. Macdonald (born 1947), American oceanographer
- Ken W. MacDonald (born 1959), Scottish businessman
- Kenneth A. MacDonald Jr. (1880–1937), American architect in San Francisco
- Kenny MacDonald (Survival of the Dead), fictional character
- Kenneth McDonald, Louisville architect, see McDonald Brothers
