= Żmijewski =

Żmijewski is a surname. Notable people with the surname include:

- Artur Żmijewski (actor) (born 1966), Polish actor
- Artur Żmijewski (filmmaker) (born 1966), Polish movie maker, visual artist, photographer
- Janusz Żmijewski (born 1943), Polish footballer
