= Tadeusz Polak =

Austrian-born Polish footballer

Personal information
- Full name: Tadeusz Polak
- Date of birth: 17 November 1944 (age 81)
- Place of birth: Kleinreifling, Austria
- Height: 1.79 m (5 ft 10 in)
- Position: Midfielder

Youth career
- 1958–1964: Wisła Kraków

Senior career*
Years	Team	Apps	(Gls)
1964–1973	Wisła Kraków	185	(15)
1974–1978	Toronto Metros-Croatia	108	(6)
1979–1981	Toronto Falcons		
1988	Polonia Hamilton		

International career
1972	Poland	2	(0)
- * Club domestic league appearances and goals

Tadeusz Polak (born 17 November 1944) is a Polish former professional footballer who played as a midfielder. He played in the Ekstraklasa, North American Soccer League, and the National Soccer League.

Polak began his career with Wisła Kraków of the Ekstraklasa in 1958. He recorded his first goal for the club on 14 October 1964 against Karpaty Krosno. In total, he played in 185 matches, recorded fifteen goals, and won the Polish Cup in 1967. In 1974, he went overseas to Canada to sign with Toronto Metros-Croatia of the North American Soccer League. He featured in the Soccer Bowl '76 against Minnesota Kicks and won the championship by a score of 3–0. In 1979, he signed with the Toronto Falcons of the National Soccer League. He retired with Polonia Hamilton in a local amateur league.

He made two appearances for the Poland national team. He made his debut on 7 May 1972 in a match against Bulgaria. His final appearance for Poland came in a friendly match on 10 May 1972 against Switzerland.

== Honours ==
Wisła Kraków

- Polish Cup: 1966–67

Toronto Metros-Croatia

- Soccer Bowl: 1976
