= Bill Millar =

Scottish-born Canadian soccer player and coach

Personal information
- Date of birth: 20 May 1950 (age 76)
- Place of birth: Lennoxtown, Scotland
- Height: 1.83 m (6 ft 0 in)
- Position: Defender

Senior career*
Years	Team	Apps	(Gls)
1971	Toronto City		
1972	Hamilton Italo-Canadians		
1973	London City		
1974	Hamilton City		
1976	Welland Lions Croatia		
1977	St. Catharines Roma		

International career
1971	Canada U23	9	(0)
1973	Canada	1	(0)

Managerial career
- 1986–2016: Brock Badgers
- * Club domestic league appearances and goals

Bill Millar (born 20 May 1950) is a Canadian former international soccer player.

== Club career ==
A defender, Millar played with Toronto City in 1971, and the following season played in the National Soccer League with Hamilton Italo-Canadians. In 1973, he played with league rivals London City. He played with Hamilton City in 1974, and later with Welland Lions Croatia and St. Catharines Roma.

In 2012, he was inducted into the Hamilton Soccer Hall of Fame. In 2014, the Ontario Soccer Association awarded Millar with the Ontario Soccer Meritorious Service Award.

== International career ==
Millar made his debut for the Canada men's national under-23 soccer team on 8 June 1971 against Mexico. He represented Canada in the 1971 Pan American Games. He made his senior debut on 5 August 1973 against the United States in a friendly match.

== Managerial career ==
After playing college soccer with the McMaster Marauders, he became a teacher. He was head coach of the Brock Badgers for 31 seasons until retiring in 2016. In 2019, he was named the head coach for Hamilton United Elite's U15 girl's Ontario Player Development League (OPDL) program.
