= Alexander Bandl =

Austrian footballer

Personal information
- Date of birth: 4 January 1944 (age 82)
- Place of birth: Vienna, Nazi Germany
- Position: Midfielder

Senior career*
Years	Team	Apps	(Gls)
1963	Montreal Cantalia		
1964–1966	Montreal Italia		
1967	New York Generals	4	(0)
1968	Dallas Tornado	10	(0)
1968–1969	Atlante		
1969–1971	SK VOEST Linz		
1972	Montreal Cantalia		
1972	Toronto Italia		
1976	Montreal Castors		
- * Club domestic league appearances and goals

Alexander Bandl (born 4 January 1944) is an Austrian former footballer who played as a midfielder.

== Career ==
Bandl played in the Eastern Canada Professional Soccer League in 1963 with Montreal Cantalia. The following season, he signed with league rivals Montreal Italia. He played with Montreal in the 1965 and 1966 seasons. In 1965, he also played in the German-American Soccer League, where he was named to the All-Star team.

In 1967, he played in the North American Soccer League with the New York Generals. The following season, he was traded to the Dallas Tornado. In 1968, he played in the Mexican Primera División with Atlante F.C. He returned to Austria in 1969 to play with SK VOEST Linz in the Austrian Nationalliga. In 1973, he returned to his former club, Montreal Cantalia, to play in the National Soccer League. He was later traded to Toronto Italia in late 1973. In 1976, he was traded to league rivals Montreal Castors.
