= Vangelis Syrigos =

Greek footballer

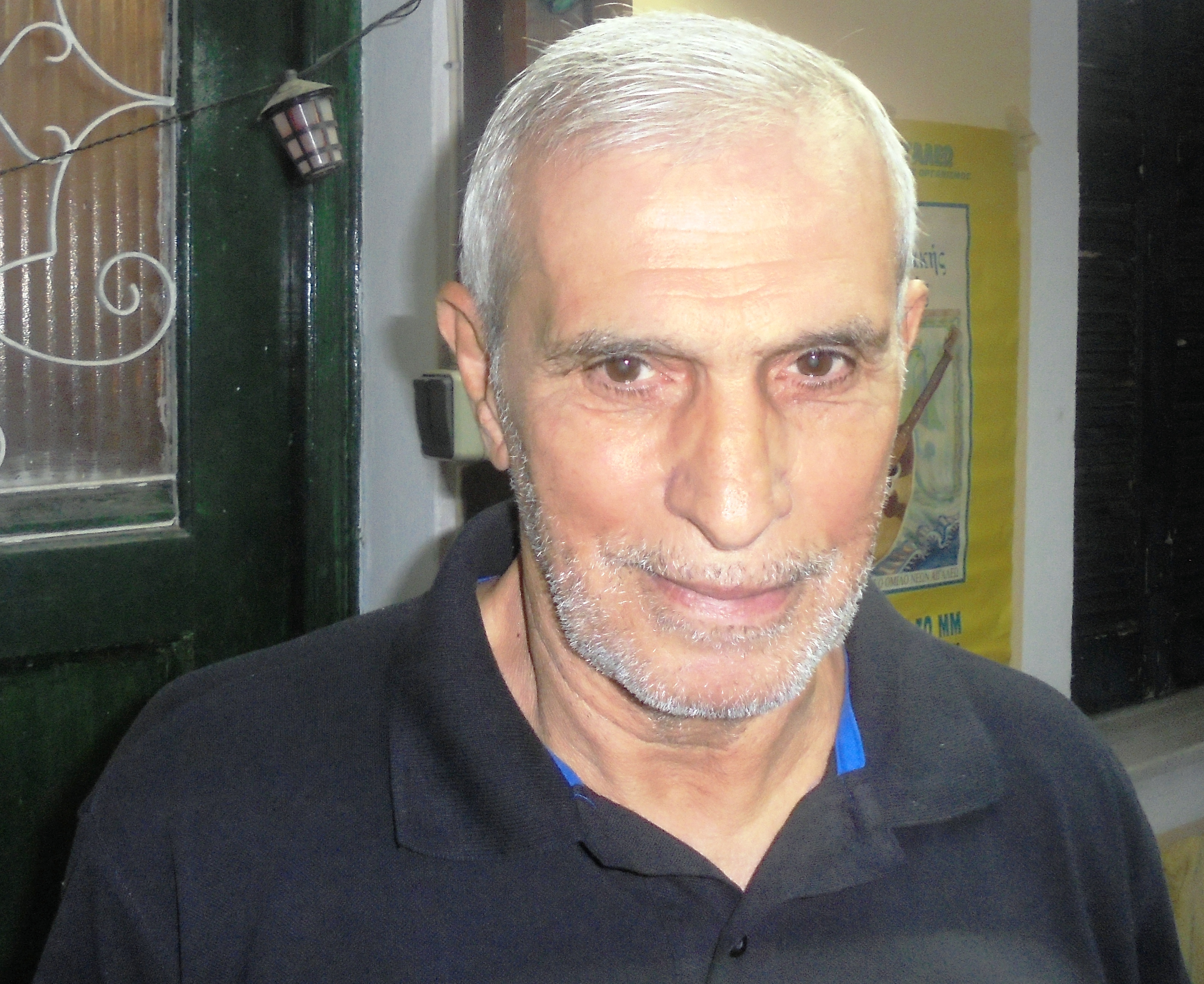
- Syrigos in 2017

Personal information
- Date of birth: 2 March 1949 (age 77)
- Place of birth: Greece
- Height: 1.80 m (5 ft 11 in)
- Position: Goalkeeper

Youth career
- 1969: Olympiacos

Senior career*
Years	Team	Apps	(Gls)
1969–1973	DAO Argonautis Piraeus		
1973–1979	Egaleo		
1975	→ Windsor Stars (loan)		
1977	→ Windsor Stars (loan)		
1979–1982	Panionios	61	(0)
1982–1983	Rodos	18	(0)
1983–1985	PAO Thriamvos Athens		
1985–1987	Apollon Athens	29	(0)
1987–1988	Kallithea		
1988–1989	Mandraikos		
- * Club domestic league appearances and goals

Vangelis Syrigos (born March 2, 1949) is a Greek former footballer who played as a goalkeeper.

== Career ==
Syrigos began playing at the youth level with Olympiacos around 1969. In 1969, he was loaned to play in the Beta Ethniki with DAO Argonautis Piraeus. In 1973, he played in the Alpha Ethniki with Egaleo When Egaleo were relegated in 1975 he assisted in securing promotion back to the top flight by winning the league title in 1976. In the summer of 1975 he played abroad in the National Soccer League with Windsor Stars. In his debut season with Windsor he was named the league's top goalkeeper. He returned to play with Windsor for the 1977 summer season.

In 1979, he signed with league rivals Panionios, and later signed with Rodos in 1982. In 1983, he played in the Gamma Ethniki with PAO Thriamvos Athens. He returned to the Alpha Ethniki in 1985 with Apollon Athens for two seasons. He had another stint in the Beta Ethniki in 1987 with Kallithea He would later conclude his career at the amateur levels with Profitis Elias, Pomegranate, and Rodopolis.
