= Eraldo Barros =

Portuguese footballer (1942-2016)

Personal information
- Full name: Eraldo Alexandre Barros
- Date of birth: 13 August 1942
- Place of birth: Campinas, Brazil
- Date of death: 19 June 2016 (aged 73)
- Position: Forward

Youth career
- 1960–1961: Paulistano Soledade

Senior career*
Years	Team	Apps	(Gls)
1962	Santa Cruz		
1963	America		
1964–1965	EC Bahia		
1966–1967	Vitória	10	(7)
1967–1968	Varzim S.C.	12	(5)
1968–1970	Peniche		
1970–1971	Esperança de Lagos		
1971–1972	Peniche		
1972–1973	Gil Vicente		
1973–1974	SC Vianense		
1974–1976	Toronto First Portuguese		
- * Club domestic league appearances and goals

Eraldo Alexandre Barros (13 August 1942 – 19 June 2016) was a Brazilian footballer who played as a forward.

== Career ==
Barros began his career in Brazil with Paulistano Soledade in 1960. He later played with Santa Cruz Futebol Clube, America Football Club, and EC Bahia. In 1966, he played abroad in the Primeira Divisão with Vitória de Guimarães. The following season he played with Varzim Sport Club for one season. In 1968, he played in the Segunda Divisão with G.D. Peniche.

The following season he played in the Terceira Divisão with C.F. Esperança de Lagos, and later returned to Peniche in 1971. He had a stint with Gil Vicente F.C., and played with SC Vianense in 1973. In 1974, he played in the National Soccer League with Toronto First Portuguese. He featured in the first match of the NSL Cup final in 1976 against Toronto Panhellenic where he contributed a goal.
