= Tibor Magyar (footballer) =

Hungarian footballer (born 1941)

Personal information
- Date of birth: 27 February 1941 (age 85)
- Place of birth: Budapest, Hungary
- Position: Midfielder

Senior career*
Years	Team	Apps	(Gls)
1968	Houston Stars	25	(1)
1969	Phoenix Club		
1969	Toronto Hungaria		
1970	Hakoah A.C		
1971	London German Canadians		
1972–1973	Oakland Rams		

Managerial career
- 1973: Oakland Rams
- * Club domestic league appearances and goals

Tibor Magyar (born February 27, 1941) is a Hungarian former footballer who played as a midfielder.

== Career ==
Magyar played in the North American Soccer League with Houston Stars in 1968. In his debut season with Houston he appeared in 25 matches and recorded one goal. In early 1969, he played in the Greater Los Angeles Soccer League with Phoenix Club. For the remainder of the 1969 season he played in Canada with Toronto Hungaria in the National Soccer League. In 1970, he played in the San Francisco Soccer Football League with Hakoah A.C.

In 1971, he returned to the NSL to play with London German Canadians. He later settled in the San Francisco Bay Area, and played in the Northern California Soccer League with the Oakland Rams in 1972. In his debut season with Oakland he assisted in securing the championship. The following season he served as a player-coach for Oakland.
