= Chris Horrocks (soccer) =

Canadian soccer player

Personal information
- Date of birth: November 15, 1954 (age 71)
- Place of birth: Montreal, Quebec, Canada
- Height: 5 ft 8 in (1.73 m)
- Position: Defender

Senior career*
Years	Team	Apps	(Gls)
1972–1973	Montreal Olympique	13	(0)
1974	Quebec Selects		
1976	Toronto Metros-Croatia	2	(0)
1977	Las Vegas Quicksilvers	19	(1)
1978	Montreal Castors		
1978	San Diego Sockers (Indoor)	0	

International career
1972–1977	Canada	18	(0)
- * Club domestic league appearances and goals

Chris Horrocks (born November 15, 1954) is a former Canadian international and North American Soccer League defender.

Horrocks played in Canada's back for 18 times between 1972 and 1977, including starting all 8 internationals Canada played in 1973 through 1975. He was on the Canadian team at the 1975 Pan American Games. He played in the NASL for the Montreal Olympique in 1972 and 1973, the Toronto Metros-Croatia in 1976 when they won the Soccer Bowl, and the Las Vegas Quicksilvers in 1977. In 1974, he played in the National Soccer League with Quebec Selects. In 1978, he returned to play in the NSL with Montreal Castors.
