= Jim Berry (soccer) =

Canadian soccer player (1945–2020)

Personal information
- Full name: Jim Walter Berry
- Date of birth: 30 May 1945
- Place of birth: Vancouver, British Columbia, Canada
- Date of death: 14 December 2020 (aged 75)
- Place of death: Brampton, Canada
- Height: 1.75 m (5 ft 9 in)
- Position: Defender

College career
Years	Team	Apps	(Gls)
- UBC Thunderbirds

Senior career*
Years	Team	Apps	(Gls)
1972	London German Canadians		

International career
1968	Canada	4	(0)
- * Club domestic league appearances and goals

Jim Walter Berry (30 May 1945 – 14 December 2020) was a Canadian international soccer player. He represented Canada at the 1967 Pan American Games and appeared in four full internationals for Canada, all of them qualification matches for the 1970 World Cup. In 1972, he played in the National Soccer League with London German Canadians.

Berry died on 14 December 2020 at a hospice in Missiauga after battling for 5 years with Parkinson's and heart disease, at the age of 75.
