= Miꞌkmaq (disambiguation) =

The Miꞌkmaq are a First Nations people living in parts of Canada's Atlantic Provinces, Quebec, and New England.

Miꞌkmaq may also refer to:

- The Miꞌkmaq language, an Eastern Algonquian language
- Miꞌkmaq hieroglyphic writing, a memory aid used by the Miꞌkmaq

== See also ==
- Micmac (disambiguation)
