= Jerzy Patoła =

Polish footballer

Personal information
- Full name: Jerzy Patoła
- Date of birth: 19 April 1946
- Place of birth: Sosnowiec, Poland
- Date of death: 1 July 2016 (aged 70)
- Place of death: Mississauga, Ontario, Canada
- Position: Goalkeeper

Youth career
- 1963: Polonia Sosnowiec

Senior career*
Years	Team	Apps	(Gls)
1964–1975	Zagłębie Sosnowiec	105	(0)
1976–1981	Toronto Falcons		

International career
1966	Poland U-23	1	(0)
- * Club domestic league appearances and goals

Jerzy Patoła (April 19, 1946 - July 1, 2016) was a Polish footballer who played in the Ekstraklasa, and the National Soccer League.

== Career ==
Patoła began his football career in 1964 with Zagłębie Sosnowiec of the Ekstraklasa where he played for 13 seasons. During his tenure with Sosnowiec his achievements were reaching the Polish Cup finals in 1970/1971, finishing runners up three times, and featuring in several Intertoto Cup tournaments. He made his debut for the club on May 24, 1964, in a match against Ruch Chorzów, and made his final appearance on November 30, 1975, against Lech Poznań. In 1976, he went overseas to Canada to sign with Toronto Falcons of the National Soccer League. He played with the club until the 1981 season.

== International career ==
He played with the Poland Olympic football team in a match against Sweden on May 19, 1966. He eventually retired from competitive soccer and settled in Canada as machinist. He died on July 1, 2016, in Mississauga, Ontario.
