= Igor Bachner =

Canadian soccer player

Personal information
- Date of birth: 16 September 1946 (age 80)
- Place of birth: Czechoslovakia
- Position: Midfielder

Senior career*
Years	Team	Apps	(Gls)
–1972	Škoda Plzeň		
1973	Montreal Olympique	19	(5)
1974–1975	Boston Minutemen	14	(0)
1975–1977	Montreal Castors		
1977	Ottawa Tigers		
1978–1979	San Diego Sockers	28	(0)
1979	Rochester Lancers	2	(0)
1979–1980	Hartford Hellions (indoor)	6	(0)
- * Club domestic league appearances and goals

Igor Bachner (born 16 September 1946) is a Canadian retired soccer player.

== Career ==
Bachner began his career with TJ Škoda Plzeň, and would appear in the 1971–72 European Cup Winners' Cup as Škoda lost to FC Bayern Munich.

He played in the NASL between 1973 and 1979 for the Montreal Olympique, Boston Minutemen, San Diego Sockers and Rochester Lancers. In 1975, he played in the National Soccer League with Montreal Castors.for three seasons. In late 1977, Bachner along with six Montreal players were traded to the Ottawa Tigers in order to assist in their playoff match against Toronto Croatia to gain promotion to the NSL First Division. The transaction provided Montreal the bargaining rights to Mick Jones.

He spent one season with the Hartford Hellions of the Major Indoor Soccer League.
