= Janusz Żmijewski =

Polish footballer (born 1943)

Personal information
- Full name: Janusz Henryk Żmijewski
- Date of birth: 4 March 1943 (age 83)
- Place of birth: Radzymin, Poland
- Position: Striker

Senior career*
Years	Team	Apps	(Gls)
1961–1972	Legia Warsaw	236	(60)
1972–1973	Ruch Chorzów	9	(0)
1973–1975	Avia Świdnik	43	(2)
1974	A.A.C. Eagles		
1975–1977	Polonia Warsaw		
1977–1978	Pogoń Siedlce		
1978	KS Piaseczno		
1978–1981	Toronto Falcons		
1981–1991	Toronto Polonia		
1991–1992	Hamilton Legion		
1992–1993	Mississauga Polonia		

International career
- Poland U18
1965–1969	Poland	15	(7)
Medal record
Men's football
Representing Poland
UEFA European Under-18 Championship
Runner-up	1961 Portugal
- * Club domestic league appearances and goals

Janusz Henryk Żmijewski (born 4 March 1943) is a Polish former professional footballer who played as a forward.

== Playing career ==
Born in Radzymin in the Masovian Voivodeship, he spent most of his career with Legia Warsaw. After his tenure with Legia he had stints with Ruch Chorzów, Avia Świdnik, A.A.C. Eagles, Polonia Warsaw, MKP Pogoń Siedlce, and KS Piaseczno.

When he finished off his career in Poland he went overseas to Canada to sign with the Toronto Falcons of the National Soccer League. During his tenure with Toronto he won the NSL Championship in 1980. He concluded his career with local amateur clubs like Toronto Polonia, Hamilton Legion, and Mississauga Polonia. After his retirement from competitive football he settled in Canada.

== International career ==
He earned 15 caps for Poland, scoring 7 goals. He made his debut on 1 November 1965 in a 6–1 loss to Italy at the Stadio Olimpico in Rome in qualification for the 1966 FIFA World Cup. In his next game, on 8 October 1967 at the Heysel Stadium in Brussels, he scored a hat-trick in a 4–2 win over Belgium in qualification for the 1968 European Nations Cup.

== Honours ==
Legia Warsaw

- Ekstraklasa: 1968–69, 1969–70
- Polish Cup: 1963–64, 1965–66

Poland U18

- UEFA European Under-18 Championship runner-up: 1961
