= Roberto Lonardo =

Uruguayan footballer

Personal information
- Place of birth: Uruguay
- Date of death: 2025 (aged 82)
- Position: Defender

Senior career*
Years	Team	Apps	(Gls)
1967–1968	Dallas Tornado		
1969–1970	Kansas City Spurs	23	(0)
1969–1970	San Pedro Yugoslavs		
1971–1974	Rochester Lancers	68	(0)
1971	Rochester Lancers (indoor)	2	(0)
1978	Buffalo Blazers		

Managerial career
- 1978: Buffalo Blazers
- * Club domestic league appearances and goals

Roberto Lonardo (died 2025) was a Uruguayan footballer who played as a defender and midfielder.

== Playing career ==
Lonardo came to the United States in 1965 after playing with Racing Club de Montevideo. In 1967, he played in the United Soccer Association with Dallas Tornado. In 1969, he played in the North American Soccer League with Kansas City Spurs. In his debut season with Kansas he assisted in securing the division title. During the NASL offseason in 1969 he played in the Greater Los Angeles Soccer League with San Pedro Yugoslavs.

In 1970, he returned to play with San Pedro Yugoslavs. In 1971, he signed with league rivals Rochester Lancers after the folding of Kansas. In his debut season with Rochester he was selected for the Third NASL All-Star team. He played with Rochester for four seasons, and played with the indoor team in 1971.

== Managerial career ==
In 1978, he was the assistant coach for the Buffalo Blazers in the National Soccer League. In June 1978, he succeeded Sam Buscarino as a player-coach for Buffalo.

== Death ==
He died on 10 September 2025, at the age of 82.
