= Franco Gallina =

Italian footballer (1945–2021)

Personal information
- Date of birth: 1 January 1945
- Place of birth: Naples, Kingdom of Italy
- Date of death: 29 June 2021 (aged 76)
- Position: Forward

Senior career*
Years	Team	Apps	(Gls)
1962–1963	Casertana	1	(0)
1963–1964	Genoa	0	(0)
1964–1965	Virtus Entella	23	(7)
1965–1966	Cesena	30	(10)
1966–1968	Genoa	42	(4)
1968–1969	Lanerossi Vicenza	12	(4)
1969–1971	Internapoli	34	(1)
1971	Montreal Olympique	20	(10)
1971–1973	Atlante		
1973	Montreal Cantalia		
1974	Toronto Italia		
1975–1976	Montreal Castors		

Managerial career
- 1973: Montreal Cantalia (player-manager)
- 1974: Toronto Italia (player-manager)
- * Club domestic league appearances and goals

Franco Gallina (1 January 1945 – 5 July 2021) was an Italian footballer who played as a forward, most notably in the Serie A and the North American Soccer League.

== Career ==
Gallina played in the Serie D in 1962 with Casertana F.C. where he assisted in securing promotion after winning the Serie D title. The following season he was signed by Genoa C.F.C. of the Serie A, but failed to make an appearance. In 1964, he played in the Serie C with Virtus Entella, and later with Cesena F.C. He returned to his former club Genoa where he played in the Serie B. After two seasons with Genoa he played in the Serie A with Lanerossi Vicenza, and made his debut on 17 November 1968 against A.C. Milan.

In 1969, he returned to Serie C to play with Internapoli Football Club. He played abroad in 1971 with Montreal Olympique in the North American Soccer League. In his debut season with Montreal he was named to the NASL Second Team. The next season he played in the Mexican Primera División with Atlante F.C. In 1973, he played in the National Soccer League with Montreal Cantalia where he served as a player-coach. In 1974, he played with league rivals Toronto Italia once more in a capacity of a player-coach. The following season he played with Montreal Castors.

He died on 5 July 2021.
