= Ken McDonald (footballer) =

Scottish footballer

Personal information
- Date of birth: 16 September 1945 (age 81)
- Place of birth: Kilwinning, Scotland
- Position: Defender

Senior career*
Years	Team	Apps	(Gls)
1966–1967	Hamilton Primos		
1968	Detroit Cougars	25	(0)
1975	Hamilton Italo-Canadians		

Managerial career
- 1975: Hamilton Italo-Canadians
- * Club domestic league appearances and goals

Ken McDonald (born 16 September 1945) is a Scottish former footballer who played as a defender.

== Career ==
McDonald played in the Eastern Canada Professional Soccer League in 1966 with Hamilton Primos. He was selected to the league's all-star team in his debut season. In 1967, Hamilton joined the National Soccer League, and he featured in the O' Keefe Trophy final against Windsor Teutonia, but Hamilton lost the series. The following season he played in the North American Soccer League with Detroit Cougars. He appeared in 25 matches for Detroit. In 1975, he returned to the NSL to serve as a player-coach for Hamilton Italo-Canadians.

== Managerial career ==
McDonald was the player-coach for Hamilton Italo-Canadians in the National Soccer League for the 1975 season.
