= Goran Peric =

Croatian footballer

Personal information
- Place of birth: SFR Yugoslavia
- Height: 1.82 m (6 ft 0 in)
- Position: Forward

Senior career*
Years	Team	Apps	(Gls)
1972–1974	Toronto Croatia		
1975	Toronto Metros-Croatia	10	(1)
- * Club domestic league appearances and goals

Goran Peric is a Croatian retired footballer who played as a forward.

== Career ==
Peric played in the National Soccer League in 1972 with Toronto Croatia. In his debut season with Croatia he assisted in securing the Canadian Open Cup by defeating Vancouver Columbus. He re-signed with Croatia for the 1973 season, and assisted Toronto by defending their Canadian Open Cup by defeating West Indies United with a hattrick. He returned for a third stint with Croatia for the 1974 season. In 1975, he played in the North American Soccer League with Toronto Metros-Croatia. In his debut season in the NASL he made ten appearances and scored one goal.
