= Jim Townsend (footballer) =

Scottish footballer (1945–2020)

Personal information
- Full name: James Clabby Townsend
- Date of birth: 2 February 1945
- Place of birth: Greenock, Scotland
- Date of death: 19 October 2020 (aged 75)
- Place of death: Canada
- Height: 5 ft 8 in (1.73 m)
- Position: Midfielder

Youth career
- Port Glasgow Athletic

Senior career*
Years	Team	Apps	(Gls)
1961–1964	St Johnstone	57	(8)
1964–1966	Middlesbrough	67	(6)
1966–1967	St Johnstone	31	(4)
1967–1972	Heart of Midlothian	107	(11)
1972–1977	Morton	89	(1)
1976	London City		
1976	Toronto Italia		
Total		351	(30)

International career
1967	Scotland	4	(1)

Managerial career
- 1977: Windsor Stars
- * Club domestic league appearances and goals

James Clabby Townsend (2 February 1945 – 19 October 2020) was a Scottish professional footballer who played for St Johnstone, Middlesbrough, Heart of Midlothian, and Morton. He made four appearances for the Scotland national team during a 1967 overseas tour that the Scottish Football Association decided in October 2021 to reclassify as full internationals. In 1976, he played in the National Soccer League with London City and Toronto Italia.

In 1977, he served as the head coach for Windsor Stars in the National Soccer League. In early 1978, the Windsor Stars dismissed him from his post.

Townsend died on 19 October 2020, at the age of 75.
