= Toronto Falcons (1975–1982) =

- Full name: Toronto Falcons Soccer Club
- Nickname: Toronto Sokoły
- Founded: 1975 (as Oakville United)
- Dissolved: 1982
- Stadium: Lamport Stadium
- Capacity: 9,600
- Owner(s): Jan & Zdzisław Rygiel
- League: National Soccer League

Toronto Falcons Soccer Club (Polish: Toronto Sokoły) was a Canadian soccer club founded in 1975 that operated in the National Soccer League (NSL). The team initially operated in Oakville, Ontario under the name Oakville United, then moved to Toronto as the Toronto Falcons. The club's fledgling years were spent in the Second Division of the NSL, and ultimately secured promotion in 1977. Toronto achieved success in the First Division by winning the NSL Cup in 1978, and the regular-season championship in 1980. The Falcons competed in the NSL for eight seasons from 1975 till 1982.

The club originally played their home matches at Blakelock High School in Oakville, and following their relocation to Toronto played in Lamport Stadium.

== History ==
The club was created in 1975 under the name Oakville United and relocated to Toronto in 1976 under the name Falcons (Sokoły for the Polish diaspora). The team operated as a professional club in the National Soccer League and was formed by brothers Jan and Zdzisław Rygiel. Jan Rygiel previously served as the manager for league rivals Toronto Polonia in the 1974 season. In their debut season, the Falcons began to play in the second division in 1976 finishing second last in the standings.

In 1977, the club recruited several imports from Poland which enabled the team to compete for the title. The acquisitions proved successful as Toronto clinched the divisional title and the second division championship. The Falcons also reached the finals of the NSL Cup but were defeated by Toronto Panhellenic.

In the 1978 season, the Falcons were promoted to the First Division where they finished third in the standings. The Toronto side would defeat the Hamilton Italo-Canadians for the NSL Cup. Their next piece of silverware was in the 1980 season where they clinched the regular-season title. They also featured in the NSL Cup final but were defeated by Toronto Italia. The club faced financial difficulties which forced the club to withdraw from the league after the 1982 season.

In 1983, the Falcons played at the amateur level at the Liga Hispanoamerica de Football Amateur (LHFA). Notable players which featured with the club were Janusz Zmijewski, Zygfryd Szołtysik, Janusz Wójcik, Tadeusz Polak, and Jerzy Patoła.

== Seasons ==
Season	League	Teams	Record	Rank	Playoffs	Ref
1975	National Soccer League (Second Division)	11	18–4–8	3rd	–	
1976	National Soccer League (Second Division)	8	4–2–15	7th	–	
1977	National Soccer League (Second Division)	10	15–2–1	1st	–	
1978	National Soccer League (First Division)	11	10–5–5	3rd	–	
1979	National Soccer League (First Division)	15	16–3–4	3rd	–	
1980	National Soccer League (First Division)	12	18–3–1	1st	–	
1981	National Soccer League (First Division)	11	7–10–3	4th	–	
1982	National Soccer League (First Division)	10	4–10–4	9th	–	

== Honours ==
- National Soccer League First Division: 1978
- National Soccer League Regular Season: 1980
- National Soccer League Second Division: 1977
- National Soccer League League Cup: 1978
