= Sudbury Cyclones (1976–1980) =

- Founded: 1976
- Dissolved: 1981
- Stadium: Queen's Athletic Field
- Owner: Wolf Mildenberger
- League: National Soccer League

Sudbury Cyclones was a soccer club based in Sudbury, Ontario. The club was formed in 1976 and originally competed in the Second Division of the National Soccer League (NSL). Sudbury played in the National Soccer League for five seasons from 1976 until the 1980 season. The club became the last representative from Northern Ontario to compete in the National Soccer League.

== History ==
Professional soccer in Northern Ontario and in the city of Sudbury can be traced back to the mining boom of the 1930s where a procession of workers settled in the area, which led to the creation of a Northern Division in the National Soccer League (NSL). The Northern Division would ultimately cease operating, but Sudbury managed to enter another franchise in the NSL in 1965 known as Sudbury Italia, which played for four seasons. Further attempts were made in 1973 to organize another franchise in Sudbury, but the bid was rejected by the NSL ownership. After a five-year absence, professional soccer returned to Northern Ontario with Sudbury Cyclones receiving an NSL franchise. In the initial years, Sudbury competed in the Second Division of the National Soccer League. The Cyclones secured a playoff berth in the 1978 season by finishing third but were eliminated in the semifinals to St. Catharines Roma.

In 1979, the club was promoted to the First Division, and finished in the sixth position. In the 1980 season, early reports of financial instability were becoming apparent with Sudbury, but the club managed to complete the season. In early 1981, the club announced its departure from the league which marked the final time that a representative from Sudbury competed in the NSL. A variety of factors such as travel expenses and failure to attract skilled players to the region contributed to the folding of Sudbury along with dwindling attendance numbers.

In the club's fledgling years Sudbury occasionally imported players from Southern Ontario and abroad. Later their roster recruitment policy shifted towards solely acquiring players from the local circuits. The club ultimately adopted a developmental philosophy by recruiting local younger players due to economical reasons and issues stemming from player commitments and travel expenses.

== Head coach history ==
- Peter Gallo (1976)
- Fulvio Stepancich (1976–1977)
- Branko Knezevich (1977)
- Fulvio Stepancich (1977)
- Peter Severinac (1977–1978)
- Jim Thomson (1978)
- Peter Severinac (1979)
- Gino Pacitto (1980)

== Seasons ==
Season	League	Teams	Record	Rank	Playoffs	Ref
1976	National Soccer League (Second Division)	8	7–4–10	6th	–	
1977	National Soccer League (Second Division)	10	6–4–8	6th	–	
1978	National Soccer League (Second Division)	7	6–2–4	3rd	Semi-finals	
1979	National Soccer League	15	10–3–10	6th	–	
1980	National Soccer League	12	3–6–13	10th	–	
