= Buffalo Blazers =

American soccer team

- Full name: Buffalo Blazers
- Founded: 1976
- Stadium: War Memorial Stadium; Buffalo, New York; Lackwanna Stadium; Lackawanna, New York
- League: National Soccer League

The Buffalo Blazers were a soccer team in Buffalo, New York. They competed in the National Soccer League in 1976–1978 and 1980. They were one of only four American teams (Detroit Besa, Detroit Canadians, and Detroit Vardar) to have competed in the National Soccer League, which was based in Canada.

== History ==
The Blazers joined the NSL for the 1976 season and became the first representative from Buffalo to compete in the league. The team ownership initially applied for a franchise in the North American Soccer League, but the Upstate New York territorial rights were held by the Rochester Lancers. Buffalo's first home venue was at Lackwanna Stadium in the suburb of Lackawanna, New York, where the club averaged an attendance of around 700 to 1,500 spectators.

The club experienced growing pains in their initial run in the Canadian circuit as they struggled to find a suitable head coach throughout the campaign. Originally, Al Block served at the helm before being replaced by Vincent Lauricella as interim coach. Ultimately, the Blazers secured the services of Alex Perolli, who had previous experience in the NASL. Perolli led Buffalo to a fourth-place finish in the division, and club striker Emmanuel Kulu finished the campaign as the leading scorer in the division.

The following season, the ownership switched their home venue to War Memorial Stadium to avoid scheduling conflicts and to adhere to the league's stadium standards. Buffalo also secured a television deal to broadcast some of their home matches. Alex Crawley, who previously managed the St. Catharines Heidelberg, was named the head coach for the season. The Blazers secured promotion to the league's First Division by finishing third.

Buffalo struggled to achieve significant results during their run in the league's top division as they finished at the bottom of the standings. The Blazers originally had Sam Buscarino as their head coach but was later replaced by Roberto Lonardo in the capacity of player-coach. Midway through the 1978 season, the club owners decided to play out in the suburbs once more as their attendance numbers sharply declined since their move to War Memorial. Since their initial move to Buffalo attendance dropped to an average of 300 to 150 in 1978. The organization ultimately transferred its home venue to Hyde Park Stadium in Niagara Falls, New York.

In 1979, the league went through a period of reorganization which resulted in Buffalo taking a hiatus and operating at the amateur level. Stephen Mechtler would serve as head coach and the team would play in a series of friendly matches against NSL clubs..

In 1980, after a one-year hiatus, the Blazers continued operations in the National Soccer League and returned to play at Lackwanna Stadium. The Blazers hired Carlo Del Monte as their head coach who previously managed Hamilton Italo-Canadians. Del Monte assembled a roster that consisted of many former Hamilton players. The acquisitions proved initially successful as Buffalo produced an undefeated streak of eight matches. Their on-field performance would later produce mediocre results due to internal strife within the organization. One notable departure was head coach Del Monte who resigned in mid-July over disputes with the front office. Following his departure, Del Monte became director of scouting in Canada for the Buffalo Stallions. The club managed to secure the final postseason berth, but the league executive denied participation in the playoffs due to financial and player issues.

In 1981, the club ceased operations and was replaced by Detroit Besa.

== Head coach history ==
- Al Block (1976)
- Vincent Lauricella (1976) as interim coach
- Alex Perolli (1976)
- Alex Crawley (1977)
- Sam Buscarino (1978)
- Roberto Lonardo (1978)
- Stephen Mechtler (1979)
- Carlo Del Monte (1980)

== Seasons ==
Season	League	Teams	Record	Rank	Playoffs	Ref
1976	National Soccer League (Second Division)	8	9–2–10	4th	–	
1977	National Soccer League (Second Division)	10	12–3–3	3rd	–	
1978	National Soccer League (First Division)	11	3–3–14	11th	–	
1980	National Soccer League	12	8–2–12	8th	–	
