= John Fahy (footballer) =

Scottish footballer (1943–2023)

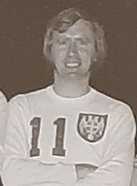
- Fahy with Serbian White Eagles in 1974

Personal information
- Full name: John Joseph Fahy
- Date of birth: 13 May 1943
- Place of birth: Paisley, Scotland
- Date of death: 6 November 2023 (aged 80)
- Place of death: Toronto, Ontario, Canada
- Position: Forward

Senior career*
Years	Team	Apps	(Gls)
1964–1966	Oxford United	23	(14)
1967	Margate		
1968–1972	Germiston Callies		
1972	Toronto Metros		
1973–1974	Toronto Hungaria		
1974	Serbian White Eagles		
1975	Toronto Italia		
- * Club domestic league appearances and goals

John Joseph Fahy (13 May 1943 – 6 November 2023) was a Scottish footballer. A forward, he played professionally for Oxford United between 1964 and 1966, making a total of 23 Football League appearances and scoring 14 goals. He and his team became the first Fourth Division club to reach the quarter-final of the FA Cup, being knocked out at this stage by Preston North End. In 1967, he played in the Southern Football League with Margate. The following season he played in South Africa's National Football League with Germiston Callies F.C. for four seasons.

Fahy also played for Toronto Metros in the NASL. In 1973, he played in Canada's National Soccer League with Toronto Hungaria where he finished as the league's top goalscorer. In 1974, midway through the season he was traded to the Serbian White Eagles FC. In 1975, he played with Toronto Italia.

Fahy died in Toronto, Ontario on 6 November 2023, at the age of 80.

== Honours ==
Serbian White Eagles

- National Soccer League Regular Season: 1974
- Canadian Open Cup: 1974

Individual

- National Soccer League Top Scorer: 1973
