= Ivica Tanković =

Croatian former footballer

Ivica Tanković is a Croatian former footballer who played as a midfielder.

== Club career ==
Tanković played in the Yugoslav First League with NK Zagreb in 1969. Throughout his tenure with Zagreb, he played in the 1969–70 Inter-Cities Fairs Cup. In 1974, he played in the National Soccer League with Hamilton Croatia.

== Managerial career ==
In 1976, he was named the head coach for Welland Lions Croatia in the National Soccer League. After several months with the club, he resigned from his position over disagreements with club management.
