= Stjepan Loparić =

Croatian footballer

Personal information
- Date of birth: 24 April 1951 (age 75)
- Place of birth: Zagreb, PR Croatia, FPR Yugoslavia
- Position: Defender

Senior career*
Years	Team	Apps	(Gls)
1974–1975	Hamilton Croatia		
1975–1976	Toronto Italia		
1977	Toronto Croatia		
1978	Toronto Metros-Croatia	28	(0)
- * Club domestic league appearances and goals

Stjepan Loparić (born 24 April 1951) is a Croatian former footballer who played as a defender.

== Club career ==
Loparić played in the National Soccer League in 1974 with Hamilton Croatia. The following season he re-signed with Hamilton, but signed with league rivals Toronto Italia late in the season. During his tenure with Toronto he featured in the NSL Cup final against Toronto Panhellenic where he recorded a goal in a 3–2 defeat. He continued playing in the National Soccer League for the 1977 season for Toronto Croatia. He featured in the promotion/relegation match against Ottawa Tigers where he contributed a goal which helped Croatia remain in the NSL First Division.

In 1978, he played in the North American Soccer League with Toronto Metros-Croatia. In his debut season he played in 28 matches with Toronto.
