= Mic Mac (brand) =

Finnish clothing brand

Mic Mac was a youth clothing store in Helsinki, Finland from the 1970s to the 2010s, which became famous for its visually shocking and erotic advertising. Mic Mac also had its own jeans brand, which was sold all over Finland. Mic Mac was famous from the late 1970s to the 1980s.

The Finnish Mic Mac brand should not be confused with the continental European luxury clothing brand MicMac in the early 1970s, owned by Brigitte Bardot's third husband Gunter Sachs.

== History ==
Mic Mac was founded by Eila Salovaara in 1972, first in Puotila and then in Kluuvi on the street Vuorikatu near Kaisaniemenkatu, which had many clothing stores at the time. Salovaara had previously worked in a private kindergarten in Puotila and had become interested in children's clothes. Before Mic Mac, she had owned a chain of children's clothing stores called "Papukaija" in various shopping centres in Helsinki. The Mic Mac store in Puotila originally sold its own products manufactured in Järvenpää as well as products by Mary Quant and Jap. As well as its own brand, Mic Mac sold products by Levi's, Lee, and Wrangler.

One of the employees in Mic Mac was Anne Murto, who had been chosen as Miss Farkku-Suomi by the Suosikki magazine in 1978 and had the "Primadonna" line of clothes which sold thousands of items modelled after her.

In the 1980s, Mic Mac's surrealist-erotic advertising was designed by Herbie Kastemaa, who even designed a new typeface for the brand. It was awarded a first prize at the 1985 Vuoden Huiput award, and Kastemaa was awarded a first prize also in the following year. Kastemaa was awarded a second prize at least four times, and the advertisements also received prizes at the Kultajyvä awards. The texts in the advertisements were designed by Alpertti Skyttä, and photographers included Ismo Hölttö and Markku Lähdesmäki.

The Finnish jeans entrepreneur Matti Majava has said that Mic Mac was the only jeans brand in Finland to enter the favour of the "baggy pants" hip hop generation in the 1990s.

The Mic Mac Boys store at the Forum shopping centre closed down in 2013. The Internet domain www.micmac.fi owned by K & N Tukku Oy disappeared in the middle 2010s.
