= Mic Mac Park =

Park in Windsor, Ontario, Canada

Coordinates: 42.28611°N 83.07239°W

Mic Mac Park is a park in Windsor, Ontario, Canada, in the west end area of the city located on Prince Road. It is perhaps the largest park complex in Windsor, and it contained two water slides, soccer fields, four baseball diamonds, a swimming pool, tennis courts and more. It is mainly popular with children during the summer seasons. Occasionally the park hosts events such as the annual Firefighters Field Day.

== History ==
On July 19, 1930, the park first opened to the public. The water slides were added only a few years ago. The water slides have since been removed due to injuries.

== See also ==
- Parks in the city of Windsor, Ontario
