= Cané =

Brazilian footballer (born 1939)

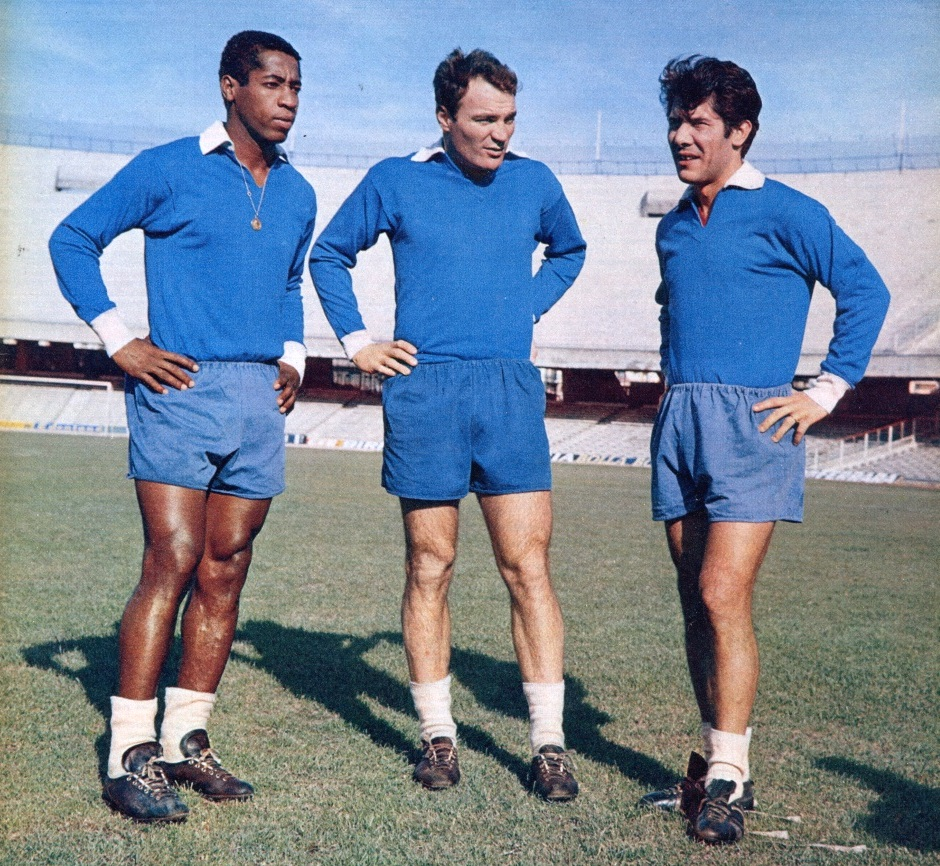

Personal information
- Full name: Jarbas Faustinho
- Date of birth: 21 September 1939 (age 87)
- Place of birth: Rio de Janeiro, Brazil
- Height: 1.72 m (5 ft 8 in)
- Position: Winger

Youth career
- Olaria

Senior career*
| Years | Team | Apps | (Gls) |
| 1961–1962 | Olaria | ? | (?) |
| 1962–1969 | Napoli | 166 | (49) |
| 1969–1972 | Bari | 66 | (6) |
| 1972–1975 | Napoli | 51 | (7) |
| 1975–1976 | Montreal Castors | | |

Managerial career
- 1975–1976: Montreal Castors
- 1976–1977: S.S.C. Napoli (youths)
- 1978–1979: Frattese Frattamaggiore
- 1979–1981: Turris
- 1981–1984: Afragolese
- 1984–1987: Sorrento
- 1987–1988: Afragolese
- 1988–1989: Campania
- 1990–1991: Juve Stabia
- 1993–1994: Ischia Isolaverde
- 1994–1995: S.S.C. Napoli
- * Club domestic league appearances and goals

Jarbas Faustinho (born 21 September 1939) commonly known as just Cané ([kaˈne]) is a Brazilian former professional footballer and coach. Although born in Brazil, Cané played the majority of his football career in Italy.

At club level he played as a winger for S.S.C. Napoli and Bari amongst many other teams. As a coach, he managed several clubs in the Province of Naples area. In 1975, he played in the National Soccer League with Montreal Castors where he served as a player-coach. He returned to Montreal for the 1976 NSL season in the same capacity.

After taking over as head coach of Napoli in 1994, Cané became the first black coach in Serie A history.

== Honours ==
=== Club ===
Napoli

- Coppa delle Alpi (1): 1966

=== Individual ===
- Coppa Italia – Top scorer: 1964–65 (3 goals)
