= St. Catharines Heidelberg =

Canadian soccer team

- Full name: St. Catharines Heidelberg
- Founded: 1960
- Dissolved: 1979
- Stadium: Club Heidelberg Field
- League: National Soccer League

St. Catharines Heidelberg was a Canadian soccer club based in St. Catharines, Ontario. The club was founded in 1960 and originally competed in the International Soccer League (later renamed Inter-City Soccer League). In 1971, the club joined the professional ranks in the National Soccer League (NSL) and played for eight seasons from 1971 until the 1978 season. In 1979, Heidelberg departed from the NSL which left St. Catharines Roma as the sole representative for the city of St. Catharines in the National Soccer League.

== History ==
St. Catharines Heidelberg was formed in 1960 and represented the German Canadian community in the Niagara region, with club president Connie Kolbow playing an instrumental role in the establishment of the organization. St. Catharines initially played in the International Soccer League (later renamed Inter-City Soccer League) in 1960 and secured the Hiram Walker Cup in 1961 which was the playoff championship title. In 1964, Heidelberg clinched the regular-season title (McGuiness Trophy) but lost the Hiram Walker Cup to Hamilton Hungarians. The club secured their first double (McGuiness & Hiram Walker Cups) in the 1968 season. Their final notable season in the Inter-City Soccer League was in 1969 when they claimed their third playoff title.

In 1971, the Niagara region received a representative in the National Soccer League as Heidelberg managed to acquire a franchise in the professional circuit. The club would compete under the name Heidelberg Nationals to appeal to a wider audience while Club Heidelberg could continue to be the primary financial backer. In the club's home opener against Toronto First Portuguese, the organization drew 1200 spectators in a 3–0 defeat on May 16, 1971. Throughout the 1971 campaign, Heidelberg would average an attendance ranging between 300 and 500 during their initial run in the provincial circuit. Initially, Alf Herman coached the team, he would recruit players from the previous roster and local regions such as Hamilton and Niagara. Herman would ultimately be replaced by Eddie Brown midway through the season. Brown would lead St. Catharines to the playoffs by securing the final berth in the postseason. Their run in the playoff tournament concluded in the opening round after a defeat by Toronto Ukraina. Following the season's conclusion, the club received the Most Gentlemanly Team award as the league's most disciplined team.

Eddie Brown would renew his coaching duties for the 1972 season and continued the club's player recruitment philosophy by relying on club veterans and youth from the local circuits. A change occurred in the club's structure as the ownership disbanded the secondary squad that competed in the Inter-City League. St. Catharines would repeat their success from their inaugural run by securing another playoff berth with an eighth-place finish. Once more their championship journey was halted in the preliminary round after a defeat by Hamilton Croatia.

Before the commencement of the 1973 season, Heidelberg encountered an issue that potentially jeopardized their participation in the upcoming season, as league bylaws required their home venue to install additional lighting to host nightly matches. Originally, the club failed to secure the necessary funds required for the addition which caused the ownership to request a leave of absence for one year. However, the club managed to raise the funds needed for the lighting and received the approval of the parent company to continue fielding a team for the 1973 season. John Santesso was brought in to manage only later to be replaced by Alex Crawley, and both men managed to field a competitive team. Throughout the early stages of the regular season, St. Catharines would become a contender for the title, as they held the top position twice and also produced an 11-game undefeated streak. Ultimately, their position dropped down to the eighth spot which meant they secured the final playoff berth. They would be eliminated in the first round of the postseason competition by Toronto Hungaria. Though St. Catharines experienced another early exit from the playoffs the attendance figures did see a 30% increase with several of their matches averaging 1000 spectators.

The structure of the NSL was reformatted in 1975 as the ownership decided to partition the league into two separate divisions with a promotion and relegation system. St. Catharines' fate was decided in the 1974 season where they finished the campaign outside the playoff realm and were relegated to the second division. Though Heidelberg failed in securing a promotion in the First Division the club still managed to secure the division's playoff championship by defeating Windsor Stars.

St. Catharines' final notable performance occurred in the 1978 season when Heidelberg finished as runners-up in the Second Division, and qualified for the promotion/relegation playoff match. Unfortunately in the following season, the Second Division was dissolved due to several clubs departing from the NSL because of failure to successfully pay all membership dues on the required deadline. St. Catharines violated the bylaw and as a result, was suspended for the season, but ultimately failed to return to the professional level.

== Honours ==
- National Soccer League Second Division Playoff Championship: 1975
- Inter-City Soccer League Hiram Walker Cup: 1961, 1968, 1969
- Inter-City Soccer League McGuiness Cup: 1964, 1965, 1968

== Seasons ==
Season	League	Teams	Record	Rank	Playoffs	Ref
1971	National Soccer League	14	11–3–12	8th	Quarterfinal	
1972	National Soccer League	15	11–8–9	8th	Quarterfinal	
1973	National Soccer League	17	12–7–11	8th	Quarterfinal	
1974	National Soccer League	19	9–7–20	14th	–	
1975	National Soccer League (Second Division)	11	13–5–12	4th	Champions	
1976	National Soccer League (Second Division)	8	2–3–16	8th	–	
1977	National Soccer League (Second Division)	10	4–4–10	7th	–	
1978	National Soccer League (Second Division)	7	9–0–3	2nd	–	
