= Arthur Rodrigues =

Portuguese football manager

Personal information
- Date of birth: 4 May 1928
- Place of birth: Lisbon, Portugal
- Date of death: 19 June 2015 (aged 87)
- Place of death: Toronto, Canada
- Position: Goalkeeper

Senior career*
Years	Team	Apps	(Gls)
1956–1957	Sportivo Montijo		
1958–1959	Toronto White Eagles		

Managerial career
- 1968–1970: Toronto First Portuguese
- 1970: Toronto Croatia
- 1972–1974: Toronto Metros
- 1975: Ontario Selects
- 1976: Toronto Italia
- 1980: Toronto Panhellenic
- * Club domestic league appearances and goals

Arthur Rodrigues (May 4, 1928 – June 19, 2015) was a Portuguese football manager who primarily coached in the National Soccer League, and North American Soccer League.

== Career ==
Rodrigues played football as a goalkeeper in Portugal for Benfica, and also was employed by Fonsecas Burnay Bank. In 1956, he played with Sportivo Montijo, and later moved to Canada where he originally was employed as a painter. In 1958, he played in the National Soccer League with Toronto White Eagles, and spent time in the Toronto and District League.

== Managerial career ==
He managed Hellenic in the National Soccer League, and also Lusitano SC in Vancouver, British Columbia. He was one of the founders and later president of the First Portuguese Cultural Centre. After the formation of Toronto First Portuguese SC he managed the club in the National Soccer League. In 1970, he initially managed First Portuguese, but later signed with Toronto Croatia. In his debut season with Croatia he secured the regular season title for the club. The following year he was appointed the director for player personal for the Toronto Metros in the North American Soccer League.

The Metros later named him the head coach in 1972. In 1973, he clinched the team's first piece of silverware by securing the division title. In 1975, he was the head coach for the Ontario Selects in the Second Division of the National Soccer League. For the 1976 season he briefly coached Toronto Italia. In 1976, he resumed his duties as head coach for the Ontario Selects. In 1980, he served as the head coach for Toronto Panhellenic, and secured the NSL Championship. He was later elected as the Provincial Senior Coach of the Ontario Soccer Association.

He died in Toronto on June 19, 2015.
