= Detroit Besa =

American soccer team

- Full name: Detroit Besa SC
- Founded: 1974
- Stadium: Keyworth Stadium; Hamtramck, Michigan

Detroit Besa is an American soccer club based in Hamtramck, Michigan, an enclave of Detroit. The club was founded in 1974 and originally competed in the Second Division of the Detroit Soccer League (DSL). In 1979, the club made the transition to the professional level by becoming the fourth American franchise (Buffalo Blazers, Detroit Canadians, and Detroit Vardar) to compete in Canada's National Soccer League (NSL). After competing in the NSL for three seasons, they returned to the amateur level by rejoining the Detroit Soccer League.

Detroit originally played their home matches at Keyworth Stadium in Hamtramck, Michigan. The club was later renamed Drita S.C. and played in the Michigan Premier Soccer League in 2018.

== History ==
Detroit Besa was formed in 1974 as a soccer club that represented the Albanian American community in Metro Detroit and played in the Second Division of the Detroit Soccer League (DSL). Detroit would debut in the National Amateur Cup tournament during its inaugural year. In 1976, Detroit defeated Carpathia Kickers by a score of 2-0 for the DSL second division title. In 1977, the club was promoted to the First Division and was fined by the league after a brawl erupted between fans during a match. The remainder of the season, Besa competed in the 1977 National Amateur Cup, but were eliminated in the state semifinal by Detroit Sport Club.

For the second consecutive season, Detroit reached the state semifinal of the 1978 National Amateur Cup. Throughout the regular season, Besa clinched the National Conference title and faced Detroit Vardar for the DSL Championship but were defeated by a score of 6-1. In 1979, the club entered the professional ranks by securing a franchise in the National Soccer League (NSL), and became one of the few American representatives in the history of the Canadian league. The following season Detroit briefly played in the Detroit Soccer League, but returned to the NSL for the 1981 season. The 1981 team was managed by former Yugoslav player Nino Berisic with an assembled roster of players with experience in the American Soccer League. Detroit returned to the NSL for the 1982 season, but withdrew from the competition near the conclusion of the season.

In 1985, the team competed in the Budweiser Indoor League The club was later renamed Drita S.C. and played in the Michigan Premier Soccer League in 2018.

== Honors ==
- Detroit Soccer League National Conference: 1978
- Detroit Soccer League Second Division Championship: 1976

== Seasons ==
Season	League	Teams	Record	Rank	Playoffs	Ref
1979	National Soccer League	15	7–6–11	7th	–	
1981	National Soccer League	11	7–2–11	8th	–	
1982	withdrew from competition					
