= Detroit Vardar =

American soccer team

- Full name: Detroit Vardar Soccer Club
- Founded: 1972
- Stadium: Detroit, Michigan
- League: Michigan Soccer League

Detroit Vardar is an American soccer team based in Detroit, Michigan. The club was founded in 1972, and originally competed in the Second Division of the Detroit Soccer League (DSL). After several notable achievements at the amateur level the organization made the transition to the professional level by becoming the fourth American franchise (Buffalo Blazers, Detroit Besa, and Detroit Canadians) to compete in Canada's National Soccer League (NSL). Though their tenure in the NSL lasted for only a season, and returned to the amateur level in 1980 by joining the Michigan Soccer League.

== History ==
Detroit Vardar was formed in 1972 and represented the Macedonian American community in the Detroit metropolitan area, and competed in the Second Division of the Detroit Soccer League (DSL). In 1974, Vardar secured promotion to the First Division by defeating Macedonian SC. In 1976, Detroit claimed their first DSL Championship, and secured a berth to the National Amateur Cup. The club would also compete in the 1977 National Challenge Cup, but were eliminated in the semifinal round to the Cleveland Serbians. During the regular season Vardar secured their second consecutive DSL Championship, and added the Michigan Cup by defeating Ann Arbor Heidelberg of the Michigan Soccer League. Detroit Vardar would conclude the season by defeating Detroit Sport Club to win the Michigan state title in the 1977 National Amateur Cup tournament.

Vardar produced another fruitful season in 1978 as the club secured their third consecutive DSL Championship by defeating Detroit Besa. Detroit would also secure the double by defeating Iraqi SC for the Challenge Cup. In the 1978 National Amateur Cup the club faced Pennsylvania state champion Upper Santa Clare in the first round of the tournament. In 1979, the club entered the professional ranks by securing a franchise in the National Soccer League (NSL), and became one of the few American representatives in the history of the Canadian league. Unfortunately Vardar's tenure in the NSL was short lived as the team withdrew from the competition near the conclusion of the season.

For the remainder of the 1979 season Detroit joined the Michigan Soccer League, and featured in the Maxwell Cup final, but were defeated by Mt. Clemens Inter Booters. The following season in the Michigan League Detroit reached the Michigan Soccer Association championship final, but were defeated by Hamtramck White Eagles. In 1984, Vardar once more made the Maxwell Cup final, but were defeated by Hamtramck White Eagles.

== Honors ==
- Detroit Soccer League Championship: 1976, 1977, 1978
- Michigan Cup: 1977
- Michigan Challenge Cup: 1978
