= Tommy Henderson (footballer, born 1943) =

Scottish footballer

Personal information
- Full name: Thomas Wedlock Henderson
- Date of birth: 25 July 1943 (age 83)
- Place of birth: Larkhall, Scotland
- Position: Right winger

Senior career*
Years	Team	Apps	(Gls)
1958–1959	Leeds United	0	(0)
1959–1960	Celtic	0	(0)
1960–1961	Hearts	7	(1)
1961–1962	St Mirren	20	(3)
1962–1965	Leeds United	24	(2)
1965–1966	Bury	7	(1)
1965–1966	Swindon Town	11	(3)
1966–1967	Stockport County	19	(4)
1967–1969	Altrincham		
1969–1970	Cork Hibs	19	(5)
1970–1971	Highlands Park		
1972–1973	Hellenic		
1974–1975	Jewish Guild		
1976–1977	Highlands Park		
1977–1978	Ottawa Tigers		
1979–1980	Bradford Marshlanders		

Managerial career
- 1978: Ottawa Tigers
- 1981: Bradford Marshlanders
- * Club domestic league appearances and goals

Tommy Henderson (born 25 July 1943) is a Scottish former professional footballer, who played as a right winger for Leeds United, Bury, Swindon Town, Stockport County in the 1960s.

== Club career ==
Henderson joined Leeds United as a schoolboy in 1959, together with his friend Billy Bremner, but Henderson soon returned to Scotland due to being homesick. Manager Don Revie brought him back to Leeds in November 1962 and he made 20 league appearances in the 1962–63 season. His place in the first team was taken by Johnny Giles in the following season and he made just four more appearances for Leeds before joining Bury in June 1965. He moved to Swindon Town during the 1965–66 season and then joined Stockport County for the 1966–67 season.

In 1977, he played in Canada's National Soccer League with Ottawa Tigers. The following season, he transitioned into a managerial role as the player-coach for Ottawa. In 1979, he played as an active player and assistant coach for league rivals Bradford Marshlanders. He re-signed with Bradford for the 1980 season.

== Managerial career ==
In 1978, he was named the head coach for the Ottawa Tigers. After the folding of Ottawa, he remained in the Canadian circuit and became an assistant coach for the Bradford Marshlanders. In 1981, he was assigned as the head coach for Bradford.

=== Playing statistics ===
Club	League	FA Cup	League Cup	Total
	Apps (goals)	Apps (goals)	Apps (goals)	Apps (goals)
Leeds United	24 (2)	6 (0)	4 (0)	34 (2)
Bury				7 (1)
Swinton Town				11 (3)
Stockport County				19 (4)
