= Lamport Stadium =

Multi-purpose stadium in Toronto, Ontario, Canada

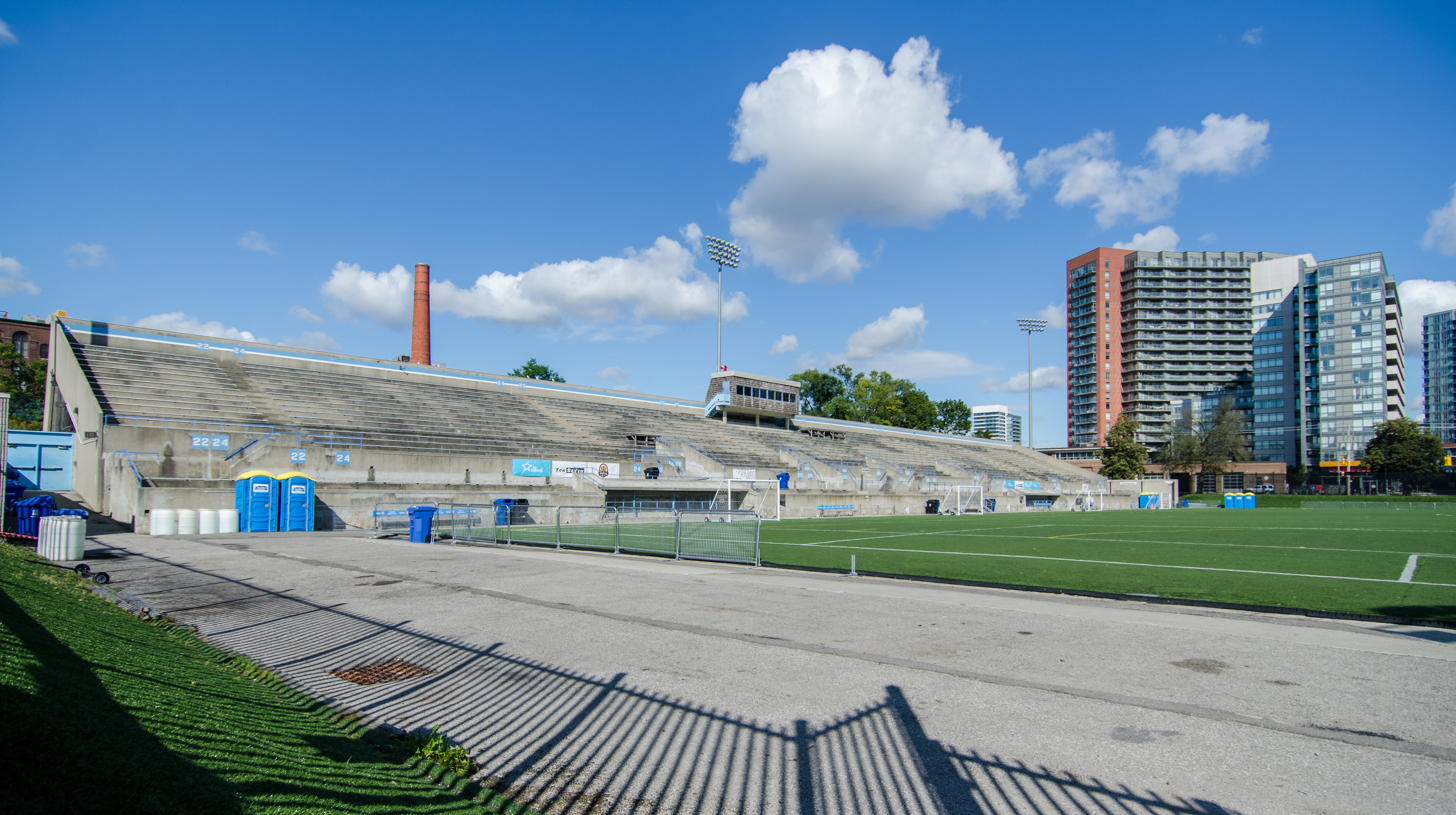
- Lamport Stadium pictured in September 2017

- Location in Toronto Location in Ontario Location in Canada
- Full name: Allan A. Lamport Stadium
- Location: 1151 King Street West; Toronto, Ontario; M6K 1E9
- Coordinates: 43°38′20″N 79°25′23″W
- Owner: City of Toronto
- Operator: Toronto Parks, Forestry & Recreation
- Capacity: 9,600
- Surface: Artificial turf
- Field size: 110 x 75 m
- Public transit: 504 King

Construction
- Built: 1974–1975
- Opened: September 19, 1976; 50 years ago
- Renovated: 2007–2008, 2018

Tenants
- Rugby League; Canada national rugby league team (2013–present); Toronto Wolfpack (TWCC) (2017–2023); Rugby Union; Toronto Arrows (MLR) (2019); Soccer; TFC Academy (CSL) (2008–2012); SC Toronto (CSL) (2008–2012); Toronto FC II (USL) (2018); Internacional de Toronto (L1O) (2014); Serbian White Eagles FC (CSL) (1975–79, 2014); Lacrosse; Toronto Nationals (MLL) (2010); Athletics; Ryerson Rams (U Sports) (2012); Toronto Rush (Ultimate Frisbee Association) (2024)

Allan A. Lamport Stadium is a multi-purpose stadium on King Street West in the Liberty Village neighbourhood of Toronto, Ontario, Canada. It is the practice facility for the Toronto Argonauts of the Canadian Football League. It is also a part-time home for the Canada national rugby league team. The playing surface of the 9,600 seating capacity stadium is also dually marked for soccer and field hockey. The stadium was named for long-time Toronto politician Allan Lamport, who was associated with sporting activities in the city.

== History ==
Lamport Stadium began construction during the winter of 1974 on the site of the Andrew Mercer Reformatory for Women. Construction was completed on July 1, 1975. The stadium was originally set to open in April 1976 but was officially opened on September 19, 1976.

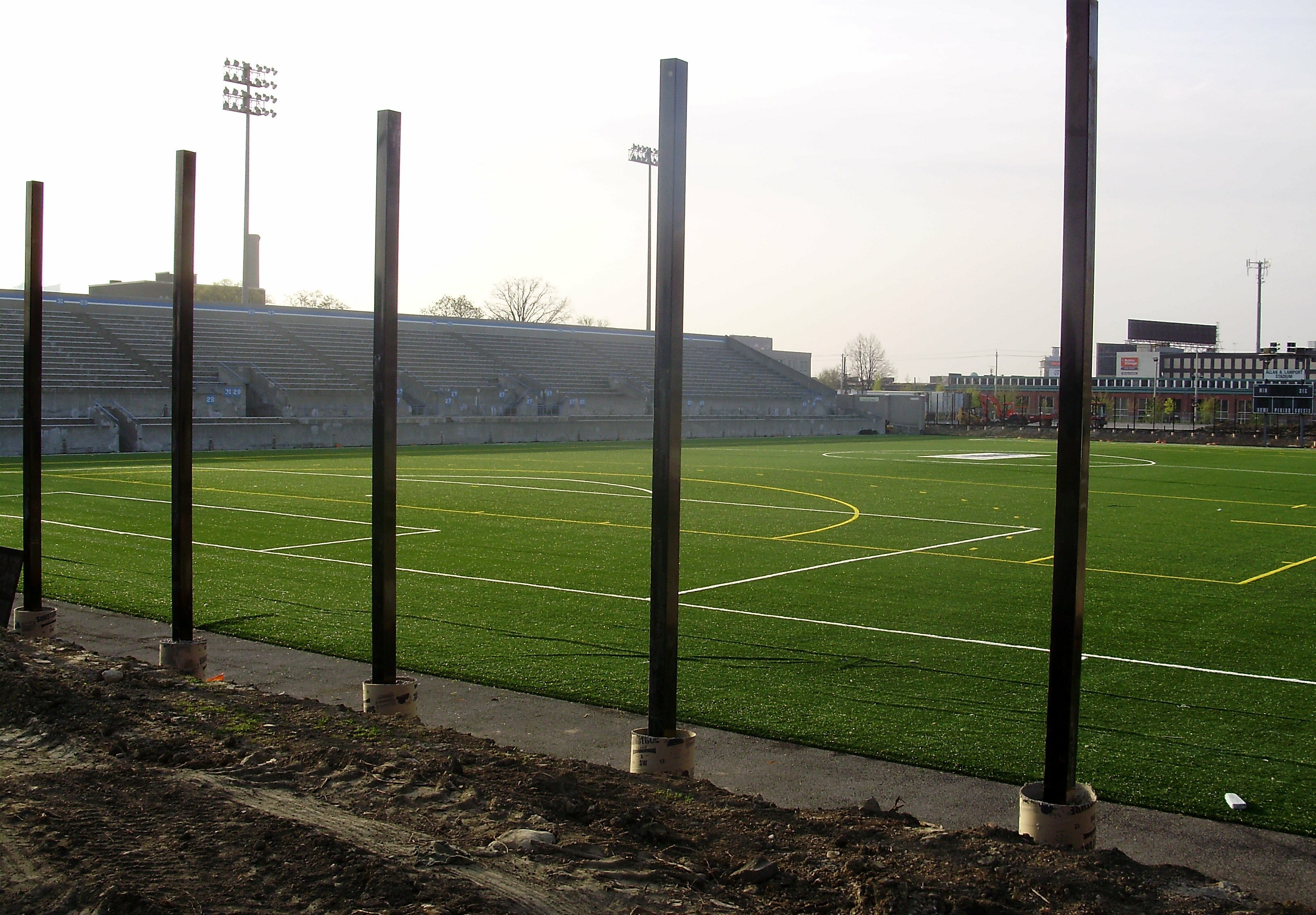
Renovation works at Lamport Stadium in April 2008.

As part of a deal with the city to convert BMO Field to natural grass, Maple Leaf Sports & Entertainment spent CA$1.2 million adding a winter bubble to Lamport Stadium in the winter of 2009–2010. MLSE manages the operations of the facility during the winter season, when the field is covered by the dome and community soccer programs are held.

In 2024, City Council requested proposals for an operator to manage Lamport Stadium, however none of the bids were accepted.

== Facilities ==
Since opening in 1976, the playing surface has been artificial turf. Lamport Stadium's indoor field measures 68 metres by 105 metres, allowing a full eleven-a-side game.

== Sports usage ==
=== Canadian football ===
In 2018, the professional Canadian football team, the CFL's Toronto Argonauts, announced that they would use the stadium as their practice facility.

=== Lacrosse ===
The Toronto Nationals played their 2010 season at Lamport Stadium before moving to Hamilton.

=== Soccer ===
Since the opening of Lamport Stadium, the National Soccer League used the stadium as a home venue for many of its clubs based in Toronto.

In 1980, Lamport was one of the hosts of a friendly tournament known as the Toronto International Soccer Cup which featured Benfica and Partizan Belgrade.

Both SC Toronto and Major League Soccer team Toronto FC's Academy side played their Canadian Soccer League home games at Lamport Stadium. The OUA's Ryerson Rams soccer teams also call the stadium home. In 2014, the Serbian White Eagles of the Canadian Soccer League and Internacional de Toronto of League1 Ontario also played their home games at the stadium. Toronto FC II announced in August 2017 that it would move its home games from the Ontario Soccer Centre to BMO Field and Lamport Stadium beginning with the 2018 season. However, with their drop to the division 3 USL League One for the 2019 season, the team moved their home games to BMO Training Ground. The University of Toronto Schools high school team also uses Lamport Stadium as a practice field and for home games.

In November 2025, as part of the rebranding of Inter Toronto FC, the club ownership is looking at upgrading Lamport through investments and renovations in order to make the stadium its new home sometime in the future.

=== Rugby league ===
On 21 May 2012, it was announced that Lamport Stadium would be the new home of the Canada national rugby league team, the Wolverines. The 2013 Colonial Cup opener against the United States national rugby league team saw a crowd of 7,168 turn out to witness a comeback victory for the Wolverines.

The stadium also hosted a professional rugby league club, the Toronto Wolfpack which played there between 2017 and 2023.

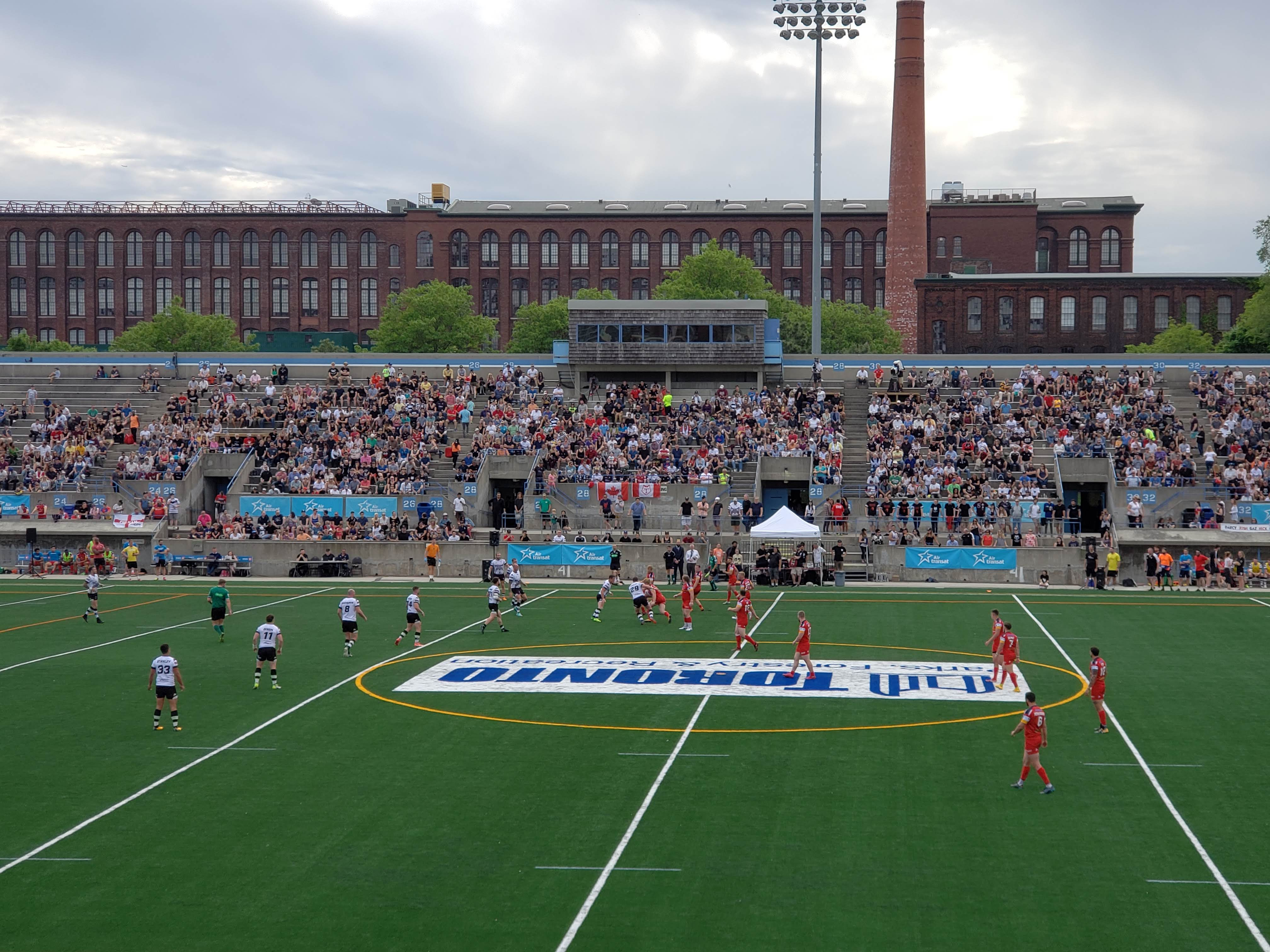
The Toronto Wolfpack playing against the London Broncos at Lamport Stadium in 2018

On May 18, 2019, Lamport hosted the inaugural Americas 9s tournament.

==== International matches ====
Date	Home	Score	Away	Competition	Attendance	Ref.
July 21, 2012	Canada	18–12	Jamaica	Caribbean Carnival Cup	4,630	
August 11, 2012	Canada	36–18	Lebanon	International Friendly	2,300	
September 8, 2012	Canada	24–28	United States	Colonial Cup	4,675	
October 6, 2012	Canada	4–68	England Lions	International Friendly	5,000	
July 6, 2013	Canada	36–20	United States	Colonial Cup	7,168	
July 20, 2013	Canada	38–14	Jamaica	Caribbean Carnival Cup	5,700	
September 7, 2013	Canada	20–28	United States	Colonial Cup	3,128	
September 24, 2013	Canada	22–30	United States	Colonial Cup	5,176	
June 21, 2014	Canada	18–40	Royal Air Force	Friendly		
July 5, 2014	Canada	12–36	England Lions	International Friendly		
July 19, 2014	Canada	24–20	Jamaica	Caribbean Carnival Cup	3,129	
August 9, 2014	Canada	52–14	United States	Colonial Cup	7,356	
August 20, 2016	Ontario State	6–38	(England) North West English Lionhearts	International Friendly		
September 3, 2016	East Canada	18–22	England Young Lions	International Friendly		
September 24, 2016	Canada	8–14	United States	2016 Americas Rugby League Championship; Colonial Cup		
October 15, 2016	Canada	10–22	South Wales Ironmen	Club vs. Country		
September 16, 2017	Canada	18–38	United States	2017 Americas Rugby League Championship; Colonial Cup	8,456	
October 19, 2024	Canada	28–6	Jamaica	International Friendly		

Canada's International Record at Lamport
Competition	Played	Won	Drawn	Lost	% Won
Caribbean Carnival Cup	3	3	0	0	100%
Colonial Cup	7	2	0	5	28.57%
International Friendly	4	2	0	2	50%
Total	14	7	0	7	50%

Updated 22 October 2024

==== Toronto Wolfpack Attendance ====
Toronto Wolfpack
League	Fixtures	Average Attendance	Highest	Lowest
2017 League 1	10	7,656	7,972	5,646
2018 RFL Championship	7	7,604	8,217	5,287
2018 Rugby League Qualifiers	5	8,133	9,266	7,540
2019 RFL Championship	12	7,882	9,974	6,735

=== Rugby union ===
In January 2019, Major League Rugby expansion team, the Toronto Arrows announced that they would split home games between Lamport Stadium and Alumni Field at York University for their inaugural season. They were scheduled to play games at the stadium in 2020, but the season was canceled due to the COVID-19 pandemic. The team moved their home games to York Lions Stadium for the 2022 season.

=== Ultimate Frisbee ===
The Toronto Rush of the Ultimate Frisbee Association played the 1st half of their 2024 home schedule at Lamport Stadium while their regular home stadium Varsity Stadium was undergoing renovations.

== Non-sports usage ==
Besides sporting events, the stadium also hosts a major Caribana event each summer: the crowning ceremony for the King and Queen of Caribana.

=== Homeless encampment ===
The area around the stadium became a homeless encampment for a period of time, but was cleared by police and city staff on July 21, 2021, resulting in arrests of both homeless people who had been staying there and protestors standing in solidarity with them. Images of police brutality from the incident were heavily circulated on various social media platforms as well as getting coverage from a variety of news outlets.

== See also ==
- List of rugby league stadiums by capacity
- Rugby league in Canada
