= Montreal Castors =

- Full name: Les Castors de Montreal
- Founded: 1975
- Dissolved: 1979
- Stadium: Claude-Robillard Stadium
- Chairman: Tony Iammatteo
- League: National Soccer League

Montreal Castors was a Canadian soccer team, founded in 1975. The team played in the National Soccer League, winning the championship in 1978 and 1979 before withdrawing from the league in 1979.

The Castors played their home games at the Claude-Robillard Stadium in Montreal, which was built for the 1976 Summer Olympics.

== History ==
Italian-born businessman, Tony Iammatteo, founded the club in 1975. The Castors featured several star soccer players from Europe and South America, including Brito, Cané, Aguinaldo Moreira, Lima, Toninho Guerreiro, Franco Gallina and Igor Bachner, and Canada men's national soccer team regulars such as Tino Lettieri and Gordon Wallace. In 1978, the team compiled a 15-1-4 record as they won the National Soccer League for the first time. The following season, the team had a 16-1-3 record as it won the league a second consecutive time.

=== Year-by-year ===
Year	Division	League	Regular season	Playoffs
1976	"2"	NSL, 2nd Division	2nd	
1977	"1"	NSL	2nd	
1978	"1"	NSL	1st	
1979	"1"	NSL	1st	

== Honours ==
- National Soccer League: 2

1978, 1979

== Notable players ==
- (Canada) Chris Horrocks (1978)
