= 1969 National Soccer League season =

National Soccer League
- Season: 1969
- Champions: Toronto First Portuguese (1st title)
- League cup: Toronto Italia
- Top goalscorer: Luis Alves (18)

The 1969 National Soccer League season was the forty-sixth season under the National Soccer League (NSL) name. The season began on May 4, 1969, with Toronto Italia facing Toronto Hellas at Stanley Park Stadium, where the match drew 6000 supporters. The match signaled an increase in attendance, as the previous time the NSL drew a similar amount was three seasons ago. The championship was contested throughout the regular season as the league canceled the playoff format. Toronto First Portuguese would claim the NSL Championship by finishing first in the standings in October. The NSL Cup was won by Toronto Italia after defeating Toronto Hungaria.

The NSL became interprovincial once again with a franchise in Montreal, Quebec. The league served as one of the country's top major leagues as both the Toronto Falcons and Vancouver Royals of the North American Soccer League folded in late 1968.

== Overview ==
The conclusion of the decade sparked a revival that would restore the National Soccer League (NSL) to a level of prominence once more in Canadian soccer. The membership increased to 14 teams, the highest since the 1950s, with the league returning to the province of Quebec. The previous time the NSL operated in Quebec was in the 1964 season, when Montreal Cantalia and Montreal Ukrainians represented the province. Montreal Inter-Italia was granted an NSL franchise. After an eight-year absence, Toronto Italia returned since their initial departure in 1961 to play in the Eastern Canada Professional Soccer League (ECPSL).

The league expanded into the London and Oakville regions with the acceptance of Arsenal Portuguese Oakville and London German Canadians. London previously competed in the London and District Soccer League, and the sole departure from the league was Windsor Teutonia. The season produced a surge in match attendance as the league began to recover from its initial decrease in the mid-1960s due to competition from the ECPSL and the North American Soccer League. Changes also occurred at the executive level with Joe Piccininni succeeding Bill Boytchuk as league president.

The NSL was involved in a dispute with the Ontario Soccer Football Association (OSFA) over refusing to issue bond payments to the OSFA. The governing body, in response, suspended the league, but the NSL continued operations and ultimately consented to paying the bond. Though the OSFA received its payment, the suspension remained in effect as another point of contention revolved around player registration and the lack of disciplinary actions regarding players. The NSL, in response, canceled its payments and continued operating as an outlaw league. Shortly after, both parties settled their dispute over a meeting.

== Teams ==
Team	City	Stadium	Manager
Arsenal Portuguese Oakville	Oakville, Ontario	Bronte Athletic Field	
Hamilton Homer	Hamilton, Ontario	Hamilton AAA Grounds	
Kitchener-Waterloo Kickers	Kitchener, Ontario	Woodside Park	Nobert Englisch
London German Canadians	London, Ontario	Cove Road Stadium	Julius Kaponya
Montreal Inter-Italia	Montreal, Quebec	Jarry Stadium	Mike Campo
Serbian White Eagles	Toronto, Ontario	Stanley Park Stadium	Ray Dobrijevic
Sudbury Italia	Sudbury, Ontario		
Toronto Croatia	Toronto, Ontario	Stanley Park Stadium	Alberto De Rosa
Toronto First Portuguese	Toronto, Ontario	Stanley Park Stadium	Arthur Rodrigues
Toronto Hellas	Toronto, Ontario	Stanley Park Stadium	Skender Perolli
Toronto Hungaria	Toronto, Ontario	Stanley Park Stadium	
Toronto Italia	Toronto, Ontario; York, Ontario	Stanley Park Stadium York Stadium	Anders Yrfeldt
Toronto Olympia	Toronto, Ontario	Stanley Park Stadium	
Toronto Ukrainia	Toronto, Ontario	Stanley Park Stadium	

=== Coaching changes ===
Team	Outgoing coach	Manner of departure	Date of vacancy	Position in table	Incoming coach	Date of appointment
Toronto Hellas	Bob Kelly	replaced			Skender Perolli	

Location of NSL teams outside of Toronto for the 1969 NSL season.

Locations of teams in Quebec for the 1969 NSL season.

== Standings ==
Pos	Team	Pld	W	D	L	GF	GA	GD	Pts
1	Toronto First Portuguese	23	14	4	5	51	25	+26	32
2	Toronto Hellas	23	12	7	4	48	34	+14	31
3	Serbian White Eagles	22	12	6	4	44	29	+15	30
4	Toronto Hungaria	22	11	7	4	52	26	+26	29
5	Sudbury Italia	22	12	4	6	47	27	+20	28
6	Toronto Ukrainians	21	11	4	6	38	23	+15	26
7	Toronto Croatia	20	10	4	6	40	25	+15	24
8	Toronto Italia	20	9	6	5	41	34	+7	24
9	Montreal Inter-Italia	21	7	5	9	31	42	−11	19
10	London German Canadians	23	7	4	12	43	43	0	18
11	Hamilton Homer	23	6	5	12	25	42	−17	17
12	Kitchener Kickers	23	5	3	15	35	51	−16	13
13	Toronto Olympia	24	5	1	18	39	71	−32	11
14	Arsenal Portuguese Oakville	21	2	2	17	23	86	−63	6

Updated to match(es) played on September 30, 1969. Source: (Note: Standings are incomplete)
Rules for classification: 1) points; 2) goal difference; 3) number of goals scored.

== Cup ==
The cup tournament was a separate contest from the rest of the season, in which all fourteen teams took part. The tournament would conclude in a final match for the Cup.

=== Finals ===
October 26, 1969	Toronto Italia	2–1	Toronto Hungaria	Toronto, Ontario
	Fortunato Raso 41',	[ Report]	Hugh Suttie 89'	Stadium: Stanley Park Stadium; Referee: John Davies
