= 1967 National Soccer League season =

National Soccer League
- Season: 1967
- Champions: Hamilton Primos (regular season); Windsor Teutonia (playoffs, 2nd title)
- Top goalscorer: Anders Yrfeldt

The 1967 National Soccer League season was the forty-fourth season under the National Soccer League (NSL) name. The season began in early May and concluded in early November, with Windsor Teutonia successfully defending the O’Keefe Trophy (NSL Championship) against Hamilton Primos. The regular-season title was clinched by Hamilton Primos by finishing first throughout the regular season.

The NSL merged with its competitor, the Eastern Canada Professional Soccer League (ECPSL), in December 1966, which elevated the status of the NSL in the Canadian soccer landscape to a secondary league behind the American-based National Professional Soccer League and the United Soccer Association.

== Overview ==
The financial instability of the Eastern Canada Professional Soccer League was becoming more apparent as key club members, Toronto City, and Toronto Italia-Falcons departed for soccer leagues based in the United States (National Professional Soccer League and United Soccer Association). In late December 1966, the ECPSL merged with the National Soccer League, with their remaining active clubs, Hamilton Primos, and Toronto Inter-Roma joining the Ontario-based circuit. The acquisition of the ECPSL clubs, along with the return of Toronto Olympia, and an expansion club, increased the membership to 12 clubs. The twelfth member, known as the Serbian White Eagles, was the expansion club that represented the Serbian community in Toronto. Several reforms were presented at the annual owners meeting, with the proposal of a promotion and relegation system and a partitioning of the league into two separate divisions. The league also received an inquiry from American interests in an attempt to acquire an NSL franchise.

Throughout the season, a dispute emerged over Toronto Roma's usage of illegal players. The dispute centered around the usage of Carlos Metidieri and Jorge Piotti, as both were signed to Boston Rovers of the United Soccer Association, and failed to receive permission from the Canadian Soccer Football Association for the usage of these contracted players. The league, in response, issued a fine and suspension to both players, and an additional fine to the Toronto Roma. Roma's defense was that the club received permission from Boston for the usage of both players. Toronto challenged the ruling and threatened to withdraw from the league. The league had a slight increase in match attendance since its initial decrease in the early 1960s.

== Teams ==
Team	City	Stadium	Manager
Hamilton Primos	Hamilton, Ontario	Hamilton Civic Stadium	Bill Paterson
Kitchener Kickers	Kitchener, Ontario	Woodside Park	Eric Boeme
Serbian White Eagles	Toronto, Ontario	Stanley Park Stadium	
Sudbury Italia	Sudbury, Ontario		
Toronto Croatia	Toronto, Ontario	Stanley Park Stadium	
Toronto Hellas	Toronto, Ontario	Stanley Park Stadium	
Toronto Hungaria	Toronto, Ontario	Stanley Park Stadium	Julius Schmidt
Toronto Olympia	Toronto, Ontario	Stanley Park Stadium	
Toronto Portuguese	Toronto, Ontario	Stanley Park Stadium	
Toronto Roma	Toronto, Ontario	Stanley Park Stadium	
Toronto Ukrainia	Toronto, Ontario	Stanley Park Stadium	
Windsor Teutonia	Windsor, Ontario	Wigle Park	Pete Laudenbach

=== Coaching changes ===
Team	Outgoing coach	Manner of departure	Date of vacancy	Position in table	Incoming coach	Date of appointment
Windsor Teutonia	Henry Wolf	replaced			Pete Laudenbach	

Location of NSL teams outside of Toronto for the 1967 NSL season.

== Standings ==
Pos	Team	Pld	W	D	L	GF	GA	GD	Pts	Qualification
1	Hamilton Primos (C)	22	18	1	3	74	15	+59	37	Qualification for Playoffs
2	Toronto Roma	22	17	1	4	67	19	+48	35	Qualification for Playoffs
3	Toronto Hellas	22	14	1	7	50	37	+13	29	Qualification for Playoffs
4	Windsor Teutonia (O)	22	13	2	7	52	39	+13	28	Qualification for Playoffs
5	Toronto Hungaria	22	11	4	7	61	50	+11	26	Qualification for Playoffs
6	Sudbury Italia	22	11	3	8	38	39	−1	25	Qualification for Playoffs
7	Toronto Portuguese	22	5	8	9	36	44	−8	18	
8	Toronto Ukrainians	22	4	6	12	21	49	−28	14	
9	Toronto Olympia	22	5	4	13	27	55	−28	14	
10	Toronto Croatia	22	4	5	13	40	66	−26	13	
11	Serbian White Eagles	22	6	1	15	35	71	−36	13	
12	Kitchener Kickers	22	4	4	14	27	61	−34	12	

Updated to match(es) played on October 30, 1967. Source: CSL standings
Standings
Rules for classification: 1) points; 2) goal difference; 3) number of goals scored.
(C) Champions; (O) Play-off winners

== Playoffs ==
The preliminary round of the playoffs was contested in a round-robin style with two separate groups, where the two group winners would qualify for the final. Sudbury Italia, Toronto Roma, and Windsor Teutonia were placed in the first group, while Hamilton Primos, Toronto Hellas, and Toronto Hungaria were placed in the second group. Toronto Roma would withdraw from the playoffs after refusing to travel to Sudbury. Windsor and Hamilton finished as their respective group champions and, as a result, qualified for the O’Keefe Trophy final. The championship final was contested in a best-of-three series.

=== Semifinals ===
October 9, 1967	Windsor Teutonia	6–0	Sudbury Italia	Windsor, Ontario
	Jurisevic,, Bob Cain, Ilia Pavljsevic	[ Report]		Stadium: Wigle Park; Attendance: 200

October 15, 1967	Sudbury Italia	2–2	Windsor Teutonia	Sudbury, Ontario
		[ Report]		Stadium: Queen's Athletic Field

Windsor won the series on goals on aggregate, 8–2.

October 7, 1967	Hamilton Primos	4–0	Toronto Hellas	Hamilton, Ontario
15:00	Duncan Henry 23', Kerr 57'; Jackie Thoms 74'	[ Report]		Stadium: Hamilton Civic Stadium

October 12, 1967	Toronto Hungaria	2–5	Toronto Hellas	Toronto, Ontario
		[ Report]		Stadium: Stanley Park Stadium

October 15, 1967	Toronto Hellas	1–1	Hamilton Primos	Toronto, Ontario
		[ Report]		Stadium: Stanley Park Stadium

October 22, 1967	Hamilton Primos	4–1	Toronto Hungaria	Hamilton, Ontario
	Duncan Henry 10', 14'; Jackie Thomas 26'; John Campostella	[ Report]	Lutz Wolonsky	Stadium: Hamilton Civic Stadium; Attendance: 200

October 24, 1967	Toronto Hellas	6–4	Toronto Hungaria	Toronto, Ontario
		[ Report]		Stadium: Stanley Park Stadium

October 29, 1967	Toronto Hungaria	0–4	Hamilton Primos	Toronto, Ontario
		[ Report]	Jackie Thomas 15', 70'; Duncan Henry 75', 83'	Stadium: Stanley Park Stadium

=== Finals ===
November 5, 1967	Hamilton Primos	1–3	Windsor Teutonia	Hamilton, Ontario
	Jack Thomas 53'	[ Report] [ Report]	Bob Cain; Jovan Urukala; Jurisevic 68'	Attendance: 150

November 12, 1967	Windsor Teutonia	1–0	Hamilton Primos	Windsor, Ontario
15:00	Gaetano Feregotto 22'	[ Report]		Stadium: Wigle Park
