= Ostap Steckiw =

Association football player (1924–2002)

Personal information
- Date of birth: March 14, 1924
- Place of birth: Lwów, Poland
- Date of death: April 13, 2001 (aged 77)
- Place of death: Toronto, Ontario, Canada
- Position: Midfielder

Senior career*
Years	Team	Apps	(Gls)
1939, 1941–1943	Ukraina Lviv		
1946	Ukraina Salzburg		
1946	Ukraina Ulm		
1946–1947	Phönix Karlsruhe	24	(2)
1948	Charleroi	0	(0)
1948–1950	Nice	8	(0)
1950	Valenciennes	15	(5)
1950–1951	Lyon	25	(4)
1951–1955	Toronto Ukrainians		
1955–1956	Rochester Ukrainians		
1955–1959	Montreal Ukrainians		
1956	Toronto Tridents		
1959	Philadelphia Ukrainians		
1959–1960	Toronto Ukrainians		
1961–1963	Toronto Inter–Roma		

International career
1957	Canada	1	(1)

Managerial career
- 1961–1963: Toronto Inter–Roma
- 1968: Toronto Ukrainians
- 1974: Toronto Ukrainians
- * Club domestic league appearances and goals

Ostap Steckiw (Ukrainian: Остап Стецьків) (March 14, 1924 – April 13, 2001) was a Canadian soccer player who earned one cap for the Canada national side against the United States in 1957, scoring one goal. During World War II he was a member of the Ukrainian Insurgent Army. He was awarded the UPA Golden Cross.

== Career ==
Steckiw played club football for ST Ukraina Lviv, Phönix Karlsruhe, Charleroi, Nice, Valenciennes, Lyon, Toronto Ukrainians, and Rochester Ukrainians.

In 1942 Steckiw became the champion of Halychyna playing for ST Ukraina Lwów. In 1957 he was the Canadian Challenger's Cup holder playing for Montreal Ukrainians.

== International career ==
Steckiw played a single game for Canada in Saint Louis against the United States along with two other Ukrainian Canadians: Mike Bereza and Walt Zakaluznyj. He scored his only goal for Canada in this match, helping to lead his team to a 3–2 victory over the United States.

== Managerial career ==
After retiring Steckiw in 1961 served as a player-coach with Toronto's Inter-Roma originally in the National Soccer League (NSL) then later in the Eastern Canada Professional Soccer League. On June 27, 1963, he resigned as head coach and was replaced by Renato Seghini. In 1968, he returned to manage in the NSL with Toronto Ukraina. He was named the head coach for Toronto Ukraina once more for the 1974 season.

He created a soccer museum in Toronto. In 1946 in city of Ulm, West Germany Steckiw created a football team "Ukraina".
