= 1968 National Soccer League season =

National Soccer League
- Season: 1968
- Champions: Sudbury Italia (regular season); Sudbury Italia (playoffs, 1st title)

The 1968 National Soccer League season was the forty-fifth season under the National Soccer League (NSL) name. The season began in late May and concluded in early October, with Sudbury Italia securing the double (regular-season title and NSL Championship). Sudbury finished first in the standings with 29 points, with a single-point difference between Toronto Hellas. Italia would face Toronto Hellas once more in the NSL Championship final. The league would serve as a secondary league in the Canadian soccer landscape as the American-based North American Soccer League expanded into British Columbia and Ontario.

== Overview ==
The membership in the league decreased to ten teams, with Hamilton Primos and Toronto Roma disbanding their teams. Stanley Park Stadium, the league's primary stadium for its Toronto members, received the necessary funds from the city to renovate the facility.

== Teams ==
Team	City	Stadium	Manager
Kitchener-Waterloo Kickers	Kitchener, Ontario	Woodside Park	Nobert Englisch
Serbian White Eagles	Toronto, Ontario	Stanley Park Stadium	Ray Dobrijevic
Sudbury Italia	Sudbury, Ontario		
Toronto Croatia	Toronto, Ontario	Stanley Park Stadium	
Toronto Hellas	Toronto, Ontario	Stanley Park Stadium	Alex Marshall
Toronto Hungaria	Toronto, Ontario	Stanley Park Stadium	
Toronto Olympia	Toronto, Ontario	Stanley Park Stadium	
Toronto Portuguese	Toronto, Ontario	Stanley Park Stadium	
Toronto Ukrainia	Toronto, Ontario	Stanley Park Stadium	Ostap Steckiw
Windsor Teutonia	Windsor, Ontario	Wigle Park	

Location of NSL teams outside of Toronto for the 1968 NSL season.
