= 1965 National Soccer League season =

National Soccer League
- Season: 1965
- Champions: Toronto Ukrainia (regular season); Toronto Hakoah (playoffs, 1st title)

The 1965 National Soccer League season was the forty-second season under the National Soccer League (NSL) name. The season began in early May and concluded in late October, with Toronto Hakoah claiming their first NSL Championship by defeating reigning champions Toronto Ukrainia. Ukrainia successfully defended its regular-season title by finishing first in the standings.

The league became once more restricted in the province of Ontario as both Montreal Cantalia and Montreal Ukrainians departed. Despite the loss of the Montreal franchises, the league expanded beyond the Greater Toronto Area, and into the Northern Ontario, Kitchener-Waterloo, and Windsor markets.

== Overview ==
The creation of the Eastern Canada Professional Soccer League (ECPSL) in 1961 had a direct financial effect on the National Soccer League (NSL). The competition, including the defection of the top NSL clubs to the ECPSL, caused a major decrease in their match attendance throughout the early 1960s. Their drop in gate earnings at Stanley Park Stadium contributed to their failure to fully pay their tax and loan payments. As their debt accumulated, the city of Toronto threatened the league with seizure and foreclosure of Stanley Park Stadium. Fortunately, the NSL was given another year's extension by the Toronto Board of Control and managed to pay a portion of their debt off after the season.

The average attendance in Toronto remained low, with the numbers ranging from 500 to 700 spectators. The league drew larger attendance outside the Toronto area, with Sudbury averaging the most with 1500, followed by Kitchener and Windsor, averaging about 1000. The league ceased being inter-provincial as Montreal Ukrainians joined the Quebec National Soccer League, and Montreal Cantalia attempted to rejoin the ECPSL. Though once more centered in Ontario, the league expanded beyond the Greater Toronto Area and added Kitchener, Sudbury, and Windsor to the circuit.

Toronto received further representation from the ethnic communities with the return of Toronto Hakoah, and the additions of Portuguese United, Toronto Azzurri, and Toronto Hellas. The Northern Ontario representative was the 1964 Ontario Cup champion Sudbury Italia, and the acceptance of Windsor Teutonia marked the return of professional soccer to the city of Windsor since the 1920s. The franchise rights to the Kitchener-Waterloo area were given to Kitchener Kickers, and Toronto Polonia ceased competing in the NSL.

== Teams ==
Team	City	Stadium	Manager
Kitchener Kickers	Kitchener, Ontario		
Portuguese United	Toronto, Ontario	Stanley Park Stadium	
Sudbury Italia	Sudbury, Ontario		
Toronto Abruzzi	Toronto, Ontario	Stanley Park Stadium	Alberto De Rosa
Toronto Azzurri	Toronto, Ontario	Stanley Park Stadium	
Toronto Croatia	Toronto, Ontario	Stanley Park Stadium	
Toronto Hakoah	Toronto, Ontario	Stanley Park Stadium	
Toronto Hellas	Toronto, Ontario	Stanley Park Stadium	
Toronto Hungaria	Toronto, Ontario	Stanley Park Stadium	
Toronto Olympia	Toronto, Ontario	Stanley Park Stadium	
Toronto Ukrainia	Toronto, Ontario	Stanley Park Stadium	
Windsor Teutonia	Windsor, Ontario	Wigle Park	Henry Wolf

Location of NSL teams outside of Toronto for the 1965 NSL season.

== Standings ==
Pos	Team	Pld	W	D	L	GF	GA	GD	Pts	Qualification
1	Toronto Ukrainians (C)	22	15	4	3	46	18	+28	34	Qualification for Playoffs
2	Toronto Hakoah (O)	22	12	8	2	65	22	+43	32	Qualification for Playoffs
3	Sudbury Italia	22	11	9	2	46	19	+27	31	Qualification for Playoffs
4	Toronto Hungaria	22	12	6	4	51	28	+23	30	Qualification for Playoffs
5	Windsor Teutonia	22	9	6	7	53	45	+8	24	Qualification for Playoffs
6	Kitchener-Waterloo Kickers	22	8	5	9	38	37	+1	21	Qualification for Playoffs
7	Toronto Croatia	22	9	3	10	40	36	+4	21	
8	Toronto Olympia	22	7	6	9	28	43	−15	20	
9	Toronto Hellas	22	7	4	11	39	64	−25	18	
10	Toronto Abruzzi	22	5	5	12	19	42	−23	15	
11	Portuguese United	21	4	3	14	28	59	−31	11	
12	Toronto Azzurri	22	2	7	13	21	57	−36	11	

Updated to match(es) played on October 1, 1965. Source:
Rules for classification: 1) points; 2) goal difference; 3) number of goals scored.
(C) Champions; (O) Play-off winners

== Playoffs ==
The preliminary round of the playoffs was contested in a round-robin style with two separate groups, where the two group winners would qualify for the final. The championship final was contested in a best-of-three series.

=== Group A ===
Team	Pld	W	D	L	GF	GA	GD	Pts	Status
Toronto Ukrainia	2	2	0	0	6	2	+4	4	Advanced to the NSL Championship final
Sudbury Italia	2	1	0	1	1	2	–1	2	
Windsor Teutonia	2	0	0	2	2	5	–3	0	

October 2, 1965	Toronto Ukrainia	4–2	Windsor Teutonia	Stanley Park Stadium, Toronto, Ontario
	Walter Skocen, Ken Beattie; Fred Patterson	[ Report]	Vigh,

October 10, 1965	Sudbury Italia	1–0	Windsor Teutonia	Sudbury, Ontario
	Frank Rosati	[ Report]

October 17, 1965	Toronto Ukrainia	2–0	Sudbury Italia	Stanley Park Stadium, Toronto, Ontario
	Frank Patterson 17'; Leo Dowhaluk 48'	[ Report]

Toronto Ukrainia advances to the final.

=== Group B ===
Team	Pld	W	D	L	GF	GA	GD	Pts	Status
Toronto Hakoah	2	1	1	0	7	1	+6	3	Advanced to the NSL Championship final
Toronto Hungaria	2	1	1	0	6	1	+5	3	
Kitchener-Waterloo Kickers	2	0	0	2	0	11	-11	0	

October 3, 1965	Toronto Hakoah	1–1	Toronto Hungaria	Stanley Park Stadium, Toronto, Ontario
	Tommy Adams	[ Report]	Tibor Ivonyj

October 8, 1965	Toronto Hungaria	5–0	Kitchener-Waterloo Kickers	Stanley Park Stadium, Toronto, Ontario
	Vic Ivonyi 5'; Kinloch 35', 64'; Tommy McLeod; John Wilson	[ Report]

October 11, 1965	Toronto Hakoah	6–0	Kitchener-Waterloo Kickers	Stanley Park Stadium, Toronto, Ontario
	Bruce Smith,, Lefkos, Kurt Dvorka	[ Report]

Toronto Hakoah advances to the final.

=== Finals ===
October 24, 1965	Toronto Ukrainia	2–3	Toronto Hakoah	Toronto, Ontario
		[ Report]		Stadium: Stanley Park Stadium

October 26, 1965	Toronto Hakoah	3–1	Toronto Ukrainia	Toronto, Ontario
20:00	Lefkos 17', 53', 74'	[ Report]	Leo Dowhaluk 5'	Stadium: Stanley Park Stadium; Attendance: 983
