= 1966 National Soccer League season =

National Soccer League
- Season: 1966
- Champions: Sudbury Italia (regular season); Windsor Teutonia (playoffs, 1st title)

The 1966 National Soccer League season was the forty-third season under the National Soccer League (NSL) name. The season began in late May and concluded in late October, with Windsor Teutonia claiming its first NSL Championship against Toronto Croatia. The regular-season title was secured by Sudbury Italia by finishing first throughout the regular season.

The ownership of Stanley Park Stadium was transferred back to the city of Toronto as the league accumulated a heavy debt and failed to make the necessary payments to retain the ownership. After the conclusion of the 1966 season, the Eastern Canada Professional Soccer League (ECPSL) merged with the National Soccer League.

== Overview ==
The league's ownership of Stanley Park Stadium was put further in jeopardy as the league officials were summoned to the Toronto Board of Control to address the outstanding debt owed to the city and other financial institutions. Originally, the board members voted to repossess the stadium and place it under the control of the Toronto Department of Parks and Recreation. The decision was later rescinded, and an agreement was reached that required the league to pay only its taxes owed from the 1963 season within eight weeks. If the league failed to pay the installment within the time frame, then the city would take possession of the stadium. The league ownership, unfortunately, failed to honor the agreement, and the stadium was transferred back to the ownership of the city. The city assumed the league's debts, and in return charged the league for the usage of the faculty in hopes of repaying the debt.

The membership in the National Soccer League decreased from twelve to eight clubs. The departing clubs were Toronto Abruzzi, Toronto Azzurri, and Toronto Hakoah, while Toronto Olympia took a sabbatical. The attendance at Stanley Park Stadium saw a 25% increase since its initial decrease in the early 1960s. Signs of financial difficulties were becoming apparent with the NSL's competitor, the Eastern Canada Professional Soccer League, as some teams were expressing intentions of defecting to American-based leagues. The reports proved to be factual as the ECPSL decided to merge with the NSL after the conclusion of both seasons. The initial intentions of the merger consisted of plans to transform the NSL into a feeder league for the ECPSL, with further expansion throughout the country and into the United States. Ultimately, the result of the merger saw the remaining ECPSL clubs join the NSL and elevate the status of the NSL to a secondary league behind the American-based National Professional Soccer League and the United Soccer Association.

== Teams ==
Team	City	Stadium	Manager
Kitchener Kickers	Kitchener, Ontario		
Portuguese United	Toronto, Ontario	Stanley Park Stadium	Joe Gonsalves
Sudbury Italia	Sudbury, Ontario	Queen's Athletic Field	
Toronto Croatia	Toronto, Ontario	Stanley Park Stadium	
Toronto Hellas	Toronto, Ontario	Stanley Park Stadium	
Toronto Hungaria	Toronto, Ontario	Stanley Park Stadium	
Toronto Ukrainia	Toronto, Ontario	Stanley Park Stadium	
Windsor Teutonia	Windsor, Ontario	Wigle Park	Henry Wolf

Location of NSL teams outside of Toronto for the 1966 NSL season.

== Standings ==
Pos	Team	Pld	W	D	L	GF	GA	GD	Pts	Qualification
1	Sudbury Italia (C)	28	18	6	4	30	12	+18	42	Qualification for Playoffs
2	Toronto Hellas	28	18	6	4	60	26	+34	42	Qualification for Playoffs
3	Toronto Ukrainians	28	17	5	6	51	28	+23	39	Qualification for Playoffs
4	Toronto Hungaria	28	14	2	12	50	36	+14	30	Qualification for Playoffs
5	Toronto Croatia	28	12	5	11	33	29	+4	29	Qualification for Playoffs
6	Windsor Teutonia (O)	26	10	4	12	22	27	−5	24	Qualification for Playoffs
7	Kitchener Kickers	28	4	4	20	23	42	−19	12	
8	Portuguese United	26	0	2	24	21	95	−74	2	

Updated to match(es) played on October 1, 1966. Source: CNSL Standings
Rules for classification: 1) points; 2) goal difference; 3) number of goals scored.
(C) Champions; (O) Play-off winners

== Playoffs ==
The preliminary round of the playoffs was contested in a round-robin style with two separate groups, where the two group winners would qualify for the final. Sudbury Italia, Toronto Croatia, and Toronto Ukrainia were placed in the first group, while Toronto Hellas, Toronto Hungaria, and Windsor Teutonia were placed in the second group. Croatia and Windsor finished as their respective group champions and, as a result, qualified for the NSL Championship final. The championship final was originally scheduled in a best-of-three series but was later changed to a two-game series.

=== Finals ===
October 23, 1966	Toronto Croatia	1–1	Windsor Teutonia	Toronto, Ontario
15:00	Mike Horvath 12'	[ Report]	Charlie Szabo 18'	Stadium: Stanley Park Stadium

October 30, 1966	Windsor Teutonia	1–0	Toronto Croatia	Windsor, Ontario
15:00	Carl Gaier	[ Report]		Stadium: Wigle Park; Attendance: 1000
