= Mike Campo =

Spanish footballer and coach

Personal information
- Full name: Michel Campo
- Place of birth: Lerida, Spain
- Position: Defender

Senior career*
Years	Team	Apps	(Gls)
1957–1958	Toronto Tridents		
1958	Toronto Italia		
1959–1960	Toronto Tridents		
1960–1961	Montreal Cantalia		
1960–1961	Philadelphia Ukrainian Nationals		
1962	Toronto Roma		
1962	Toronto City		
1963–1965	Montreal Italica		
1967	Montreal Hungaria		
1969	Montreal Inter-Italia		
1971	Montreal Olympique	2	(0)

Managerial career
- 1969: Montreal Inter-Italia
- 1970: Montreal Superga
- 1971: Montreal Olympique
- * Club domestic league appearances and goals

Mike Campo is a Spanish former footballer who played as a defender and as a football manager.

== Career ==
Campo was born in Lerida, Spain, and played football with various teams in Spain, and France. He played in the National Soccer League in 1957 with the Toronto Tridents. He re-signed with the Tridents for the 1958 season but was traded to Toronto Italia later in the season. He returned to his former club Tridents in 1959 and re-signed for the 1960 season. In the middle of the season, he was traded to league rivals Montreal Cantalia. In late 1960 he played in the American Soccer League with the Philadelphia Ukrainian Nationals, where he assisted in winning the league championship.

In 1961, he played in the Eastern Canada Professional Soccer League as Montreal Cantalia was a charter club. After the departure of Montreal in 1962, he signed with league rivals Toronto Roma. In late 1962, he was traded to Toronto City and he returned to play with Montreal Cantalia for the 1963 season. He signed with Montréal Italica in 1964 and re-signed for the 1965 season. He played his final season with Montreal Italica in 1966.

The following season he played in the Quebec Major Soccer League with Montreal Hungaria. In 1969, he returned to play in the National Soccer League with Montreal Inter-Italia. In 1971, he played in the North American Soccer League with Montreal Olympique and served as an assistant coach.

== Managerial career ==
Campo transitioned into managing in the National Soccer League with Montreal Inter-Italia for the 1969 season. The following season, he became a player-coach with Montreal Superga in the Quebec Major Soccer League.

He served as the assistant coach under Renato Tofani for the Montreal Olympique in 1971. After the resignation of Tofani in early May he became the head coach for Montreal on an interim basis. He was succeeded by Sebastiano Buzzin on June 15, 1971.
