= Bobby Kinloch =

Scottish footballer

Personal information
- Full name: Robert Kinloch
- Date of birth: 1935
- Place of birth: Glasgow, Scotland
- Date of death: 27 August 2014 (aged 79)
- Positions: Inside forward; wing half

Youth career
- Forres Mechanics
- Edinburgh Waverley

Senior career*
| Years | Team | Apps | (Gls) |
| 1959–1962 | Hibernian | 17 | (12) |
| 1962–1963 | Greenock Morton | 13 | (2) |
| 1963–1964 | Berwick Rangers | 16 | (1) |
| 1964–196x | Toronto City | | |
| 1965 | Toronto Hungaria | | |
| 1966–1967 | Hamilton Steelers | | |
| 1967–1968 | Raith Rovers | 12 | (0) |
| 1968 | Dunfermline Athletic | 3 | (0) |
- * Club domestic league appearances and goals

Robert "Bobby" Kinloch (1935 – 27 August 2014) was a Scottish footballer who played for Forres Mechanics F.C. in the Scottish Highland Football League, Hibernian (Hibs), Greenock Morton, Berwick Rangers, Toronto City, Hamilton Steelers, Raith Rovers and Dunfermline Athletic.

Kinloch started his senior career with Forres Mechanics FC, having previously served his National Service in the Royal Air Force (RAF). Kinloch was stationed in Malaya while serving in the RAF and he played for the Malaya national football team. During his time with Hibs, Kinloch scored the winning goal in a European tie against Barcelona. After spells with Morton and Berwick, Kinloch emigrated to Canada and played in the ECPSL for Toronto and with Hamilton in 1966. In 1965, he played in the National Soccer League with Toronto Hungaria. He returned to Scotland and played for Fife clubs Raith Rovers and Dunfermline during the 1967–68 season, after which he retired from playing football.

He had a business career and attended many events organised by the Hibs former players' association after retiring from football. Kinloch died in 2014, aged 79.
