= Yanko Daucik =

Czechoslovak footballer

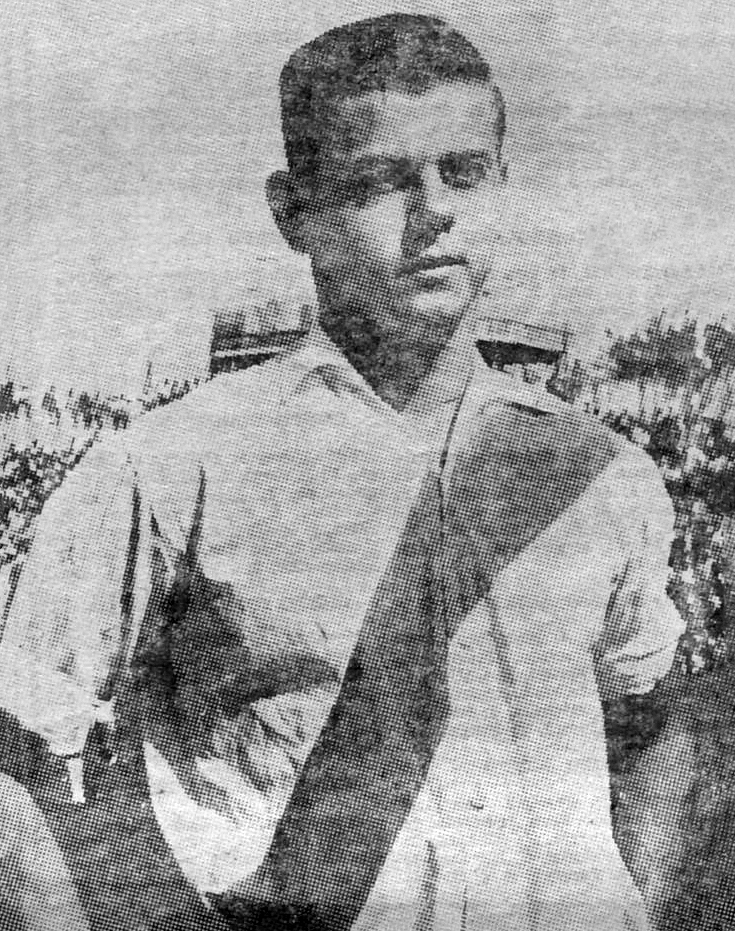
- Daucik in 1959

Personal information
- Full name: Yanko Daucik Ciboch
- Date of birth: 22 March 1941
- Place of birth: Prague, Czechoslovakia
- Date of death: 13 May 2017 (aged 76)
- Place of death: Madrid, Spain
- Position: Forward

Youth career
- 1958–1959: Indauchu

Senior career*
| Years | Team | Apps | (Gls) |
| 1959–1960 | Atlético Madrid aficionados | – | (–) |
| 1960 | Salamanca | | |
| 1960–1962 | Real Betis | 38 | (14) |
| 1962–1964 | Real Madrid | 10 | (3) |
| 1964–1965 | Atlético Madrid | 0 | (0) |
| 1965–1966 | Melilla | 20 | (3) |
| 1966–1967 | Mallorca | 20 | (6) |
| 1966 | Toronto Italia Falcons | | |
| 1967–1968 | Toronto Falcons | 21 | (25) |
| 1968 | Universidad de Chile | 2 | (0) |
| 1968–1969 | Rayo Vallecano | 14 | (7) |
| 1969–1970 | Sant Andreu | 17 | (9) |
| 1970–1971 | Español | 13 | (1) |
| 1971–1972 | Xerez | 8 | (1) |
- * Club domestic league appearances and goals

Yanko Daucik Ciboch (22 March 1941 – 13 May 2017) was a Czechoslovak professional footballer during the 1960s and 1970s. Yanko played for Real Betis, Real Madrid, the Toronto Falcons and RCD Español. Daucik is the son of Ferdinand Daučík, the veteran La Liga manager who moved with his family to Spain in 1950.

Daucik made his La Liga debut for Real Betis on 11 September 1960 in a game against RCD Mallorca. His father was the Betis manager at the time. Yanko scored 14 goals in 38 La Liga appearances for Betis, attracting the interest of Real Madrid who signed him in 1962. However he faced stiff competition from the likes of Alfredo Di Stéfano, Francisco Gento, Ferenc Puskás and Amancio Amaro and during two seasons at Real he only played 10 La Liga games and scored just 3 goals. In the summer of 1966 he played in the Eastern Canada Professional Soccer League with Toronto Italia Falcons. He subsequently became one of the first Spanish footballers to play in North America when he played for Toronto Falcons of the National Professional Soccer League. This proved to something of a family reunion as Yanko was joined at the club by his father Ferdinand, brother-in-law Ladislao Kubala and nephew Branko Kubala. During the 1967 season Yanko played 17 games, scored 20 goals and made 8 assists for the Falcons and finished as the top scorer in the league.

In 1968, Daucik moved to Chile and played for Universidad de Chile.

Daucik died on 13 May 2017 in Madrid at the age of 76.
