= 1964 National Soccer League season =

National Soccer League
- Season: 1964
- Champions: Toronto Ukrainia (regular season); Toronto Ukrainia (playoffs, 5th title)

The 1964 National Soccer League season was the forty-first season under the National Soccer League (NSL) name. The season began in early May and concluded in October, with Toronto Ukrainia successfully defending their NSL Championship by defeating Toronto Abruzzi. Ukrainia also won the league double by finishing first in the standings.

The league returned once more into the province of Quebec with the return of both Montreal Cantalia and Montreal Ukrainians. As the league was entangled in a fierce rivalry with the Eastern Canada Professional Soccer League (ECPSL), it also faced further competition in the Greater Toronto Area, where several of its former clubs formed a breakaway league known as the Ontario Soccer League (OSL).

== Overview ==
The creation of the Eastern Canada Professional Soccer League (ECPSL) in 1961 had a direct financial effect on the National Soccer League (NSL). The competition, including the defection of the top NSL clubs to the ECPSL, caused a major decrease in their match attendance throughout the early 1960s. Their drop in gate earnings at Stanley Park Stadium contributed to their failure to fully pay their tax and loan payments. Fortunately, the Toronto Board of Control granted the NSL a grace period by extending the deadline another year.

The membership in the league increased to eight teams, with the league expanding out of Ontario and into Quebec. Two new editions were based in Toronto, with Toronto Abruzzi and Toronto Polonia being granted franchises. The Quebec representatives were returnees Montreal Cantalia and Montreal Ukraina, where both clubs previously departed to compete in the ECPSL. Montreal's return to the NSL circuit caused further tension with the ECPSL, as both Montreal clubs had scheduled their home matches on the same night as their ECPSL counterpart, Montreal Italica. In response, Italica appealed to the Quebec Soccer Federation, with the governing body ordering the schedule to be remodified. The situation was settled with Montreal Ukraina transferring their home venue to Jarry Park Stadium and scheduling their matches on a different date.

The league also faced opposition on the home front when Italian Virtus, Toronto Estonia, and Toronto Hakoah splintered from the NSL to form the Ontario Soccer League. Throughout the season, relations between the NSL and ECPSL improved, with both parties entering into negotiations about a potential merger. Ultimately, in early October, the ECPSL ownership rejected the proposal and continued the rivalry for another two seasons.

The regular season finished with a controversial ending, with Montreal Cantalia originally clinching the title but having several points revoked due to Montreal fielding an ineligible player. After their deduction in points, Cantalia finished as runners-up to Toronto Ukraina, with Montreal protesting the reversal by opting out of the playoffs.

== Teams ==
Team	City	Stadium	Manager
Montreal Cantalia	Montreal, Quebec	Delorimier Stadium	Sebastiano Buzzin
Montreal Ukraina	Montreal, Quebec	Jarry Park Stadium	
Toronto Abruzzi	Toronto, Ontario	Stanley Park Stadium	Alberto De Rosa
Toronto Croatia	Toronto, Ontario	Stanley Park Stadium	Tony Ercegovic
Toronto Hungaria	Toronto, Ontario	Stanley Park Stadium	
Toronto Olympia	Toronto, Ontario	Stanley Park Stadium	Jimmy Lauder
Toronto Polonia	Toronto, Ontario	Stanley Park Stadium	
Toronto Ukrainia	Toronto, Ontario	Stanley Park Stadium	Oleksandr Skotsen

== Standings ==
Pos	Team	Pld	W	D	L	GF	GA	GD	Pts	Qualification
1	Toronto Ukrainians (C, O)	21	12	7	2	58	28	+30	31	Qualification for Playoffs
2	Montreal Cantalia (Note: Montreal withdrew from playoffs)	21	12	3	6	56	33	+23	27	
3	Toronto Olympia	21	8	7	6	46	25	+21	23	Qualification for Playoffs
4	Toronto Abruzzi	21	9	5	7	23	21	+2	23	Qualification for Playoffs
5	Toronto Hungaria	21	9	5	7	42	40	+2	23	Qualification for Playoffs
6	Toronto Polonia	21	7	3	11	49	56	−7	17	
7	Toronto Croatia	21	4	3	14	21	46	−25	11	
8	Montreal Ukrainians	21	4	3	14	21	49	−28	11	

Updated to match(es) played on September 20, 1964. Source: NSL Standings
Rules for classification: 1) points; 2) goal difference; 3) number of goals scored.
(C) Champions; (O) Play-off winners

== Playoffs ==
=== Finals ===
October 4, 1964	Toronto Ukrainia	1–0	Toronto Abruzzi	Toronto, Ontario
		[ Report]		Stadium: Stanley Park Stadium

October 12, 1964	Toronto Abruzzi	1–4	Toronto Ukrainia	Toronto, Ontario
		[ Report]		Stadium: Stanley Park Stadium
