= Leafs (disambiguation) =

The Leafs, or Toronto Maple Leafs, are a Canadian ice hockey team.

Leafs may also refer to:

- plural of leaf; correctly spelled as "leaves"

== Ice hockey ==
- Des Moines Oak Leafs, a minor league professional ice hockey team
- Lethbridge Maple Leafs, a men's senior ice hockey team
- Nelson Leafs, a Canadian 'B' Junior ice hockey team
- St. John's Maple Leafs, an American Hockey League team, later relocated and renamed the Toronto Marlies
- Verdun Maple Leafs, a defunct Quebec Major Junior Hockey League team
- Victoria Maple Leafs, a Western Hockey League team

== Baseball ==
- Danville Leafs, a professional minor league baseball team
- Toronto Maple Leafs (semi-pro baseball), an Intercounty Baseball League team
- Toronto Maple Leafs (International League), a former AAA minor league baseball team

== Other sports ==
- Notre-Dame-de-Grace Maple Leafs, a defunct Canadian junior football team
- Toronto Maple Leafs (soccer club), a Canadian National Soccer League club from the 1930s

== See also ==
- Leaf (disambiguation)
- Leafing
