= Victor Jurisevic =

Yugoslav footballer

Personal information
- Date of birth: 9 November 1941
- Place of birth: Tuzla, Kingdom of Yugoslavia
- Date of death: 9 February 2023 (aged 81)
- Place of death: Oak Brook, Illinois, United States
- Position: Forward

Senior career*
Years	Team	Apps	(Gls)
1967	Windsor Teutonia		
1968	Detroit Cougars	0	(0)
1968	Toronto Falcons	20	(6)
1969	Greek American AA		
1969–1971	Toronto Croatia		
1974	Chicago Croatian		
- * Club domestic league appearances and goals

Victor Jurisevic (born September 9, 1941 – 9 February 2023) was a Yugoslavian former footballer who played as a forward.

== Career ==
Jurisevic played in the Yugoslav First League in 1966 with Sloboda Tuzla, and later with NK Istra 1961. The following season, he played abroad in the National Soccer League with Windsor Teutonia, where he recorded 29 goals. He featured in the O' Keefe Trophy final against Hamilton Primos and scored the winning goal to secure the title for Windsor. In 1968, he signed with the Detroit Cougars of the North American Soccer League. He failed to make an appearance for Detroit as he was released during training camp.

In May 1968, he signed with league rivals Toronto Falcons and made his debut against New York Generals. In his debut season in the North American Soccer League, he recorded six goals. He was also selected as a guest player for the NSL All-Star team in 1968 against the Canada national team in a friendly match. In early 1969, he played in the German-American Soccer League with Greek American AA. For the remainder of the 1969 season, he returned to the National Soccer League with Toronto Croatia and played three seasons with the club. In 1974, he played in the National Soccer League of Chicago with Chicago Croatian and featured in the 1974 National Challenge Cup.

He died on February 9, 2023.
