= Frank Pike (soccer) =

Canadian soccer coach (1930–2010)

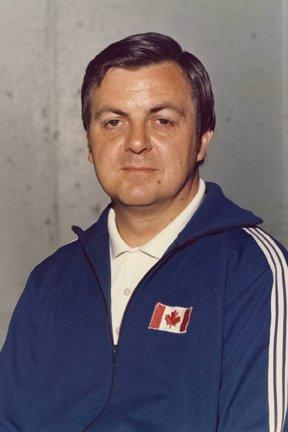
- Pike in 1970

Personal information
- Date of birth: 26 March 1930
- Place of birth: Plymouth, England
- Date of death: 1 June 2010 (aged 80)
- Place of death: Qualicum Beach, British Columbia, Canada
- Position: Midfielder

Senior career*
Years	Team	Apps	(Gls)
1946–1950	Plymouth Argyle	34	(3)

Managerial career
- 1955–1956: Toronto Azzurri
- 1957–1963: Toronto Olympians
- 1964: Toronto Tridents
- 1964: Toronto Roma
- 1964–1969: Toronto Falcons
- 1970: Toronto Roma
- 1972: Canada
- 1970–1974: Canada U-23
- 1974–1978: Ontario Minor Soccer Association
- 1979: Club Jalisco
- 1979–1980: Ontario Provincial
- 1981–1982: Toronto Metros
- 1983: Toronto Nationals
- * Club domestic league appearances and goals

Frank Pike (26 March 1930 – 1 June 2010) was a Canadian soccer player and coach.

== Career ==
Pike was born in Plymouth, England, and played in midfield as an amateur for hometown club Plymouth Argyle.

== Coaching career ==
Pike, as a Canadian citizen, began his coaching career in 1955. Coaching professional teams in the late 1950s and early 1960s. In 1964, he coached in the National Soccer League with Toronto Tridents, and Toronto Roma in the Eastern Canada Professional Soccer League. Pike became involved at the national level with the Canadian World Cup Team in 1968. In 1970, Pike was appointed as the National Team Coach for all Canadian teams, participating in International competitions at the Pan American and Olympic Games, World Cup and Youth games. Pike was responsible for the original development of Canadian National teams in international competition, his contributions resulting in vast improvements in the performance and credibility of Canadian soccer teams. In 1974, he took on the position of Provincial coach for the Province of Ontario, being responsible for the development of many players who moved forward to the national team. As Ontario Provincial Coach, he was also responsible for teaching and mentoring other coaches to grow professionalism for the sport in Canada. He also had a brief spell managing Mexican Primera División side Club Jalisco during 1979.

Pike is a recipient of the Achievement Award from the Province of Ontario. His work running coaching clinics in Guadalajara and coaching a team in the Mexican Primera División, as well as during International tournaments in BC, gained him respect amongst his peers.

== Personal life ==
Frank lived comfortably in British Columbia following his retirement from the sport.
