= 1962 National Soccer League season =

National Soccer League
- Season: 1962
- Champions: FC Olympia-Harmonie Toronto (regular season); Toronto Italian Virtus (playoffs, 1st title)
- Top goalscorer: Dave Hutchinson (22)

The 1962 National Soccer League season was the thirty-ninth season under the National Soccer League (NSL) name. The season began in late April and concluded in early November, with Toronto Italian Virtus defeating reigning champions Toronto Ukrainia for the NSL Championship. The regular-season title was clinched by FC Olympia-Harmonie Toronto.

== Overview ==
There was a major reshuffle in the league's membership due to competition from the Eastern Canada Professional Soccer League (ECPSL). Two of the National Soccer League's (NSL) major clubs, the Polish White Eagles and Toronto Roma, were accepted into the ECPSL. The league also lost its final representative from Quebec with the departure of Montreal Concordia. The rivalry between the two leagues began to have a financial strain on the NSL, which caused a major decrease in gate earnings at Stanley Park Stadium. Since the creation of the ECPSL in 1961, the NSL's annual average attendance record dropped from 231,000 in 1960 to 35,000 in 1962. The average attendance at Stanley Park was around 1000 throughout the 1962 season.

Despite the departure of some of the league's top clubs, the membership increased to 12 members. The new entries were primarily former members of the Toronto and District Soccer League. The additions were Hellenic, Toronto Italian Virtus, Queen City, Toronto Croatia, Toronto Estonia, and Toronto Macedonians. The city of Oshawa was added to the circuit with the acceptance of Oshawa Hungarians and Oshawa Italia. Toronto Italian Virtus was granted a franchise with the hopes of attracting the Italian diaspora, whose fan support the league had lost due to the departure of Toronto Italia and Toronto Roma to the ECPSL.

Several league members capitalized on the usage of ECPSL players as the ECPSL season concluded earlier around August. The procession of ECPSL players to the NSL caused issues with the Canadian Soccer Football Association and Ontario Soccer Association over the control of player registrations. In an attempt to curb the free movement of players, the governing bodies issued fines to clubs and barred players who failed to obtain permission from their parent clubs.

== Teams ==
Team	City	Stadium	Manager
Hellenic	Toronto, Ontario	Stanley Park Stadium	
Italian Virtus	Toronto, Ontario	Stanley Park Stadium	George Stellyn
Oshawa Hungarians	Oshawa, Ontario		
Oshawa Italia	Oshawa, Ontario		
Queen City	Toronto, Ontario	Stanley Park Stadium	
Toronto Croatia	Toronto, Ontario	Stanley Park Stadium	
Toronto Estonia	Toronto, Ontario	Stanley Park Stadium	
Toronto Hungaria	Toronto, Ontario	Stanley Park Stadium	
Toronto Macedonians	Toronto, Ontario	Stanley Park Stadium	Imre Dora
FC Olympia-Harmonie Toronto	Toronto, Ontario	Stanley Park Stadium	Jimmy Lauder
Toronto Ukrainia	Toronto, Ontario	Stanley Park Stadium	
Toronto Ulster United FC	Toronto, Ontario	Stanley Park Stadium	Steve Koltati

=== Coaching changes ===
Team	Outgoing coach	Manner of departure	Date of vacancy	Position in table	Incoming coach	Date of appointment
Toronto Macedonians	Alex Skorek	replaced			Imre Dora	

== Playoffs ==
The preliminary round of the playoffs was contested in a round-robin style with two separate groups, where the two group winners would qualify for the final. The championship final was contested in a two-game series. Toronto Ulster United FC later withdrew from the playoffs due to financial issues. The top six teams qualified for the playoffs.

=== Group A ===
October 9, 1962	FC Olympia-Harmonie Toronto	0–2	Toronto Italian Virtus	Stanley Park Stadium, Toronto, Ontario
		[ Report]	Egidio Papais; Frank Rosati

October 12, 1962	FC Olympia-Harmonie Toronto	1–0	Oshawa Italia	Stanley Park Stadium, Toronto, Ontario
	Klaus Woitschatzke 46'	[ Report]		Referee: Derek Gardner

October 14, 1962	Oshawa Italia	0–4	Toronto Italian Virtus	Oshawa, Ontario
		[ Report]	Frank Rosati 10', 50'; Giuseppe Tonani; Angelo

October 18, 1962	Toronto Italian Virtus	1–0	FC Olympia-Harmonie Toronto	Stanley Park Stadium, Toronto, Ontario
	Giuseppe Tonani 35'	[ Report]

October 21, 1962	Toronto Italian Virtus	3–0	Oshawa Italia	Stanley Park Stadium, Toronto, Ontario
	Emilio Daddato; Sebastin Fronte; Gus Tonani	[ Report]

Toronto Italian Virtus advances to the final.

=== Group B ===
October 8, 1962	Toronto Ukraina	4–0	Toronto Ulster United	Stanley Park Stadium, Toronto, Ontario
	Paul Dowhaluk,, Leo Dowhaluk	[ Report]		Attendance: 700

October 11, 1962	Toronto Ukraina	4–0	Toronto Estonia	Stanley Park Stadium, Toronto, Ontario
		[ Report]

October 19, 1962	Toronto Estonia	0–1	Toronto Ukraina	Stanley Park Stadium, Toronto, Ontario
		[ Report]	Paul Dowhaluk 3'	Referee: Bobby Reid

Toronto Ukrainia advances to the final.

=== Finals ===
October 28, 1962	Toronto Ukrainia	0–2	Toronto Italian Virtus	Toronto, Ontario
		[ Report]	Gus Tonani 38'; Frank Rosati 62'	Stadium: Stanley Park Stadium

November 4, 1962	Toronto Italian Virtus	2–3 (a.e.t.)	Toronto Ukrainia	Toronto, Ontario
	Frank Rosati 67'; Joe Tonani 102'	[ Report]	George Crook 10'; Leo Dowhaluk 17'; Paul Dowhaluk 83'	Stadium: Stanley Park Stadium; Referee: Phil McKay

Toronto Italian Virtus won the series 4-3 on goals on aggregate.
