= 1970 National Soccer League season =

National Soccer League
- Season: 1970
- Champions: Toronto Croatia (regular season, 1st title); Hamilton Croatia (playoffs, 1st title)
- League cup: Toronto First Portuguese
- Top goalscorer: Nino Flamini (25)

The 1970 National Soccer League season was the forty-seventh season under the National Soccer League (NSL) name. The season began in late April and concluded in early November with the NSL Championship final. The regular-season title was clinched by Toronto Croatia by finishing first throughout the regular season. In the playoffs, the championship title was won by Hamilton Croatia after defeating Toronto Croatia. The NSL Cup was secured by Toronto First Portuguese after defeating Toronto Hellas.

== Overview ==
Before the commencement of the season, a dispute emerged between the National Soccer League (NSL) and the Ontario Soccer Association (OSA) over a variety of issues during the OSA's annual meeting. At the meeting, the NSL's delegation requested that the league receive more representatives in future OSA meetings and a percentage of the gate earnings from friendly matches involving touring European teams. All of the NSL's requests were denied, and in addition, the league was required to recruit match officials from the local Referees Society. The league's circuit became centered around a Montreal–London corridor with the league expanding to the Ottawa region for the first time in its history.

The Ottawa franchise was given to Ottawa Sons of Italy, who were the 1969 champions of the Ottawa-Rideau Soccer League. Hamilton received further representation with the acceptance of Hamilton Apollos and Hamilton Croatia. Hamilton Croatia previously competed in the Inter-City Soccer League. The NSL retained its presence in Quebec with the Portuguese de Quebec of Montreal replacing Montreal Inter-Italia. Two notable absentees were Toronto Italia and Sudbury Italia, as both were given a leave of absence to settle their financial troubles. Another departing club was Arsenal Portuguese Oakville.

Reports were also circulating of a potential national Canadian championship featuring champions from the NSL and the Western Canada Soccer League. The NSL began to experience an increase in match attendance since its initial decrease and stagnation in the mid-1960s. The Toronto-based teams at Stanley Park averaged the highest amount, with an average of 1000 per match, followed by London, which averaged around 680 spectators.

== Teams ==
Team	City	Stadium	Manager
Hamilton Apollos	Hamilton, Ontario	Hamilton AAA Grounds	Andy Pollack
Hamilton Croatia	Hamilton, Ontario	Hamilton AAA Grounds	Joe Dundovic
Hamilton Homer	Hamilton, Ontario	Hamilton AAA Grounds	
Kitchener Concordia	Kitchener, Ontario		
London German Canadians	London, Ontario	Cove Road Stadium	Phil Brooman
Ottawa Sons of Italy	Ottawa, Ontario	St. Joseph's High School	Sandro Rausa
Portuguese de Quebec of Montreal	Montreal, Quebec	Jarry Stadium	
Serbian White Eagles	Toronto, Ontario	Stanley Park Stadium	Alan Harvey
Toronto Croatia	Toronto, Ontario	Stanley Park Stadium	Arthur Rodrigues
Toronto First Portuguese	Toronto, Ontario	Stanley Park Stadium	Arthur Rodrigues (Note: Rodrigues was First Portugal's head coach at the start of the season then later joined Toronto Croatia)
Toronto Hellas	Toronto, Ontario	Stanley Park Stadium	
Toronto Hungaria	Toronto, Ontario	Stanley Park Stadium	
Toronto Olympia	Toronto, Ontario	Stanley Park Stadium	
Toronto Ukrainia	Toronto, Ontario	Stanley Park Stadium	Leo Dowhaluk

=== Coaching changes ===
Team	Outgoing coach	Manner of departure	Date of vacancy	Position in table	Incoming coach	Date of appointment
Toronto Croatia	Marijan Bilić	End of caretaker spell			Arthur Rodrigues	

Location of NSL teams outside of Toronto for the 1970 NSL season.

Locations of teams in Quebec for the 1970 NSL season.

== Standings ==
Pos	Team	Pld	W	D	L	GF	GA	GD	Pts	Qualification
1	Toronto Croatia (C)	26	20	3	3	75	19	+56	43	Qualification for Playoffs
2	Hamilton Croatia (O)	26	16	8	2	67	24	+43	40	Qualification for Playoffs
3	Serbian White Eagles	26	17	5	4	60	26	+34	39	Qualification for Playoffs
4	Toronto First Portuguese	26	15	4	7	56	37	+19	34	Qualification for Playoffs
5	London German Canadians	26	13	6	7	55	29	+26	32	Qualification for Playoffs
6	Toronto Hellas	26	13	5	8	49	36	+13	31	Qualification for Playoffs
7	Hamilton Homer	26	12	7	7	48	36	+12	31	Qualification for Playoffs
8	Ottawa Sons of Italy	26	9	6	11	39	49	−10	24	Qualification for Playoffs
9	Toronto Hungaria	26	7	8	11	42	43	−1	22	
10	Soccer Portugais du Quebec of Montreal	26	6	7	13	23	45	−22	19	
11	Toronto Ukrainians	26	7	3	16	34	51	−17	17	
12	Hamilton Apollos	26	6	4	16	25	57	−32	16	
13	Kitchener Kickers	26	5	3	18	31	84	−53	13	
14	Toronto Olympia	26	1	1	24	23	91	−68	3	

Updated to match(es) played on October 30, 1970. Source: http://canadiansoccerleague.ca/wp-content/uploads/2014/06/NSL_1921_1992.pdf
Rules for classification: 1) points; 2) goal difference; 3) number of goals scored.
(C) Champions; (O) Play-off winners

== Playoffs ==
=== Quarterfinals ===
October 22, 1970	Toronto Croatia	2–1	London German Canadians	Toronto, Ontario
20:30		[ Report]		Stadium: Stanley Park Stadium

October 24, 1970	Toronto First Portuguese	5–0	Ottawa Sons of Italy	Toronto, Ontario
20:30		[ Report]		Stadium: Stanley Park Stadium

October 25, 1970	Hamilton Croatia	5–1	Toronto Hellas	Toronto, Ontario
14:00	Karol Martisek,, Malcolm Sinclair	[ Report]	John Stambolidis	Stadium: Stanley Park Stadium; Referee: Terry Bell

October 25, 1970	Serbian White Eagles	0–0 (Note: Serbia advanced to the semi-final as Hamilton was suspended)	Hamilton Homer	Toronto, Ontario
16:00		[ Report]		Stadium: Stanley Park Stadium

=== Semifinals ===
October 24, 1970	Toronto Croatia	4–1	Serbian White Eagles	Toronto, Ontario
20:00		[ Report]		Stadium: Stanley Park Stadium

October 29, 1970	Toronto First Portuguese	0–0 (a.e.t.) (3–5 p)	Hamilton Croatia	Toronto, Ontario
20:30		[ Report]		Stadium: Stanley Park Stadium

=== Finals ===
November 1, 1970	Toronto Croatia	0–3	Hamilton Croatia	Toronto, Ontario
		[ Report]	Arpad Hoffman; Karol Martisek,	Stadium: Stanley Park Stadium

== Cup ==
The cup tournament was a separate contest from the rest of the season, in which all fourteen teams took part. The tournament would conclude in a final match for the Cup.

=== Finals ===
September 27, 1970	Toronto First Portuguese	2–1 (a.e.t.)	Toronto Hellas	Toronto, Ontario
	Alves 57'; Yaúca 120'	[ Report]	John Stampoulidis 62'	Stadium: Stanley Park Stadium; Attendance: 7205; Referee: Terry Bell
