= Zakaluzny =

Zakaluzny (Ukrainian: Закалюжний) is a Ukrainian masculine surname. Its feminine counterpart is Zakalyuzhnaya. It may refer to:

- Oksana Zakalyuzhnaya (born 1977), Russian basketball player
- Polina Zakaluzny (born 1992), Israeli rhythmic gymnast
- Walt Zakaluznyj, Canadian association football player
