= Stetskiv =

Stetskiv, also transliterated Steckiw, is a Ukrainian surname. Notable people with the surname include:

- Olena Stetskiv (born 1994), Ukrainian luger
- Ostap Steckiw (1924–2001), Canadian soccer player
