= 1992 National Soccer League season =

National Soccer League
- Season: 1992
- Champions: Toronto Croatia (regular season, 5th title); Woodbridge Azzurri (playoffs, 1st title)
- League cup: Toronto Croatia
- Top goalscorer: Enver Sej
- Best goalkeeper: Tony Camacho

The 1992 National Soccer League season was the sixty-ninth and final season under the National Soccer League (NSL) name. The season began May 8, 1992, with Richmond Hill Kick facing North York Atletico Argentina at Centennial Park Stadium. The season concluded with Toronto Croatia securing the league double (NSL Championship and league cup). Croatia would defeat the North York Atletico Argentina SC for the NSL Ontario Cup by a score of 2-1 at Centennial Park Stadium in Etobicoke, Ontario.

The season marked the final usage of the National Soccer League banner and was changed to Canadian National Soccer League in 1993. The change occurred due to the financial collapse of the Canadian Soccer League (CSL) and its merger with the National Soccer League.

== Overview ==
The majority of the teams returned for the season with the addition of Richmond Hill Kick. The departing clubs were North York Strikers and Scarborough International. The playoff format was reinstated, with the top four teams qualifying for the tournament.

Toronto Italia played in several friendly matches with notable Italian clubs such as Inter Milan and S.S. Lazio. Toronto initially faced Lazio on May 30, 1992, and later played Inter Milan on June 5, 1992, both of which ended in a losing effort.

In late 1992, reports of financial instability regarding the Canadian Soccer League were becoming apparent as several of the league's Ontario clubs were expressing a desire to join the National Soccer League. The following season, the Canadian Soccer League was suspended by the Canadian Soccer Association and was amalgamated into the National Soccer League and became known as the Canadian National Soccer League.

=== Teams ===
Team	City	Stadium	Manager
London City	London, Ontario	Cove Road Stadium	Harry Gauss
Richmond Hill Kick	Richmond Hill, Ontario	Richmond Green Sports Centre	
North York Atletico Argentina	Toronto, Ontario	Lamport Stadium	Elio Garro
St. Catharines Roma	St. Catharines, Ontario	Club Roma Stadium	Tony Novacic
Toronto Croatia	Etobicoke, Ontario	Centennial Park Stadium	Vid Horvath
Toronto Italia	Etobicoke, Ontario	Centennial Park Stadium	Ivan Marković
Toronto Jets	North York, Ontario	Esther Shiner Stadium	
Windsor Wheels	Windsor, Ontario	Windsor Stadium	Waldir de Souza
Woodbridge Azzuri	Vaughan, Ontario	Rainbow Park Stadium	Peter Pinizzotto

Location of NSL teams outside of Toronto for the 1992 NSL season.

Location of NSL teams in Toronto for the 1992 NSL season.

== Final standings ==
Pos	Team	Pld	W	D	L	GF	GA	GD	Pts	Qualification
1	Toronto Croatia (C)	16	11	4	1	38	10	+28	26	Qualification for Playoffs
2	Toronto Jets	16	9	4	3	28	22	+6	22	Qualification for Playoffs
3	St. Catharines Roma	16	6	7	3	22	13	+9	19	Qualification for Playoffs
4	Woodbridge Azzuri (O)	16	7	5	4	35	20	+15	19	Qualification for Playoffs
5	Richmond Hill Kick	16	7	5	4	31	24	+7	19	
6	Toronto Italia	16	3	9	4	17	21	−4	15	
7	London City	16	3	5	8	10	21	−11	11	
8	North York Atletico Argentina	16	2	4	10	20	34	−14	8	
9	Windsor Wheels	16	0	7	9	17	53	−36	7	

Updated to match(es) played on September 15, 1992. Source:
Rules for classification: 1) points; 2) goal difference; 3) number of goals scored.
(C) Champions; (O) Play-off winners

== Playoffs ==
=== Semifinals ===
September 16, 1992	St. Catharines Roma	0–0	Toronto Croatia	St. Catharines
20:15		[ Report]		Stadium: Club Roma Stadium; Attendance: 300

September 21, 1992	Toronto Croatia	2–2	St. Catharines Roma	Etobicoke
20:00	John Coyle 9'; Hrvote Kanisek 42'	[ Report]	Devere Hurley 21'; Roman Kezman 32'	Stadium: Centennial Park Stadium

St. Catharines won the series on away goals.

September 16, 1992	Toronto Jets	1–1	Woodbridge Azzurri	North York
		[ Report]		Stadium: Esther Shiner Stadium

September 24, 1992	Woodbridge Azzurri	1–0	Toronto Jets	Vaughan
		[ Report]		Stadium: Rainbow Creek Stadium

Woodbridge won the series 2–1 on aggregate.

=== Final ===
September 27, 1992	St. Catharines Roma	0–1	Woodbridge Azzurri	St. Catharines
14:30		[ Report]		Stadium: Club Roma Stadium

October 4, 1992	Woodbridge Azzurri	0–1 (a.e.t.) (5–4 p)	St. Catharines Roma	Vaughan
14:30		[ Report]	Rudy Pikuzinski	Stadium: Rainbow Creek Stadium; Attendance: 800

Woodbridge won the series on a penalty shootout.

== Individual awards ==
The recipients of the annual NSL awards were announced on October 5, 1990. The Greater Toronto Area-based clubs would receive the majority of the accolades, with Toronto Croatia winning the most. London City was the only club outside the Greater Toronto Area to receive any awards and was given two awards.

Award	Player (Club)
NSL MVP	Velimir Crljen (Toronto Croatia)
NSL Golden Boot	Enver Sej (Richmond Hill Kick)
NSL Rookie of the Year	Tony Mazzoli (Toronto Jets)
NSL Goalkeeper of the Year	Tony Camacho (London City)
NSL Coach of the Year	Vid Horvath (Toronto Croatia)
NSL Manager of the Year	Zarko Brala (Toronto Croatia)
NSL Most Disciplined Team	London City
