= Walter Zakaluzny =

Canadian international soccer player

Personal information
- Full name: Wolodymyr Zakaluzny
- Date of birth: 2 May 1925
- Place of birth: Przemyśl, Poland
- Date of death: 1 September 2013 (aged 88)
- Place of death: Toronto, Canada
- Height: 1.78 m (5 ft 10 in)

Senior career*
Years	Team	Apps	(Gls)
–1944	Sian Przemyśl		
1946–1947	Ukraina Ulm		
1946–1947	Phönix Karlsruhe	5	(0)
1947	Dnister Zuffenhausen		
1948	Sitch Regensburg		
1949–1950	Jahn Regensburg	15	(5)
1950–1951	Schwaben Augsburg	20	(1)
1951–1955	Toronto Ukrainians		
1955–1956	Rochester Ukrainians		
1956–1957	Toronto Tridents		
1957–1960	Toronto Ukrainians		
1960–1961	Montreal Ukrainians		

International career
1957	Canada	2	(0)
- * Club domestic league appearances and goals

Wolodymyr "Walter" Zakaluzny (2 May 1925 – 1 September 2013) was a Canadian international soccer player who earned two caps for the national team in 1957.

He made his professional debut for Sian Przemyśl. After World War II, Zakaluzny moved to West Germany where he lived in a displaced persons camp from 1945 to 1950. He played soccer for a number of teams in Germany such as Ukraina Ulm, Phönix Karlsruhe, Dnister Zuffenhausen, Sitch Regensburg, Jahn Regensburg and Schwaben Augsburg.

As a Ukrainian immigrant to Canada, Zakaluzny played for a number of soccer teams in North America, including the Toronto Ukrainians, the Rochester Ukrainians, the Toronto Tridents, and the Montreal Ukrainians.

Zakaluzny died on 1 September 2013, from natural causes.
