= Hamilton Steelers =

Hamilton Steelers may refer to:

- Hamilton Steelers (1958–67), a soccer club that belonged to the Eastern Canada Professional Soccer League and Canadian National Soccer League
- Hamilton Steelers (1981–92), a charter member of the Canadian Professional Soccer League and Canadian Soccer League
- Hamilton Steelers (ice hockey), a senior team competing in Allan Cup Hockey
