= 1989 National Soccer League (Canada) season =

National Soccer League
- Season: 1989
- Champions: Toronto Italia (11th title)
- League Cup: Toronto Croatia

The 1989 National Soccer League season was the sixty-sixth season under the National Soccer League (NSL) name. The season concluded on September 18, 1989, with Toronto Italia defending their seventh consecutive NSL Championship by finishing first in the First Division. Toronto Italia also claimed the NSL Canadian Championship by defeating Montreal Ramblers of the Quebec National Soccer League (LNSQ) on September 20, 1989, at the Claude Robilliard Stadium in Montreal, Quebec. The NSL Cup was also successfully defended by Toronto Croatia. Croatia would also defeat LNSQ Cup champions St. Leonard to win the Canada Cup.

== Overview ==
Changes were announced during the offseason to the league structure, with the league's youth division reformed as the Second Division. The restructuring of the division marked the return of the NSL's Second Division since the 1978 season, but the promotion and relegation system wasn't reactivated between the two divisions. The reforms also permitted the second division clubs to participate in the NSL Cup. The membership of the First Division was reduced to eight teams, with London Marconi requesting a leave of absence. Chile Lindo's NSL franchise was revoked for continuous problems regarding fan violence, and the Mississauga Lakers disbanded their team. The league had another presence in the Niagara territory in the Second Division with a team named Niagara City, and a notable returnee was Oshawa Italia, which previously played in the 1962 NSL season.

The lone expansion franchise was the Toronto Macedonia Stars, which provided a Macedonian presence in the league since the 1977 season.Toronto Italia was involved in a friendly match against noted Portuguese side S.L. Benfica. The match was played on June 7, 1989, with Benfica defeating Toronto by a score of 3-1 at Varsity Stadium.

=== Teams ===
Team	City	Stadium	Manager
America United	Toronto, Ontario		
North York Strikers	North York, Ontario	Esther Shiner Stadium	Rinato Gobbato
Oshawa Italia	Oshawa, Ontario		
St. Catharines Roma	St. Catharines, Ontario	Club Roma Stadium	
Toronto First Portuguese	Toronto, Ontario	Lamport Stadium	
Toronto Croatia	Etobicoke, Ontario	Centennial Park Stadium	Tonko Vukušić
Toronto Italia	Etobicoke, Ontario	Centennial Park Stadium	Ivan Marković
Toronto Macedonia Stars	Toronto, Ontario		Keith Pandovski
Toronto Panhellenic	Toronto, Ontario		
Windsor Wheels	Windsor, Ontario	Windsor Stadium	Ian Parratt

Location of NSL teams outside of Toronto for the 1989 NSL season.

Location of NSL teams in Toronto for the 1989 NSL season.

== Final standings ==
Pos	Team	Pld	W	D	L	GF	GA	GD	Pts	Qualification
1	Toronto Italia (C)	14	11	2	1	36	11	+25	24	Qualification for Playoffs
2	Toronto Croatia	13	9	0	4	27	13	+14	18	
3	Toronto First Portuguese	14	6	4	4	24	16	+8	16	
4	Toronto Macedonia Stars	14	6	3	5	25	20	+5	15	
5	America United	14	4	5	5	16	20	−4	13	
6	Windsor Wheels	14	3	3	8	23	33	−10	9	
7	Toronto Panhellenic	13	3	2	8	14	28	−14	8	
8	St. Catharines Roma	14	2	3	9	17	37	−20	7	

Updated to match(es) played on September 18, 1989. Source:
Rules for classification: 1) points; 2) goal difference; 3) number of goals scored.
(C) Champions
