= Tony Lecce =

Italian-born Canadian soccer player

Personal information
- Full name: Anthony Lecce
- Date of birth: January 1, 1945 (age 81)
- Place of birth: Rome, Italy
- Position: Defender

Senior career*
Years	Team	Apps	(Gls)
1964–1966	Toronto Italia		
1967	Boston Tigers		
1968	Toronto Falcons	28	(1)
1969	Rochester Lancers		
1969	Toronto Italia		
1970	Toronto Hungaria		
1971–1973	Toronto Metros	39	(0)

International career
1968–1972	Canada	8	(0)
- * Club domestic league appearances and goals

Anthony Lecce (born January 1, 1945) is an Italian-born Canadian former soccer defender. He earned nine caps with the Canadian national soccer team, and played four seasons in the North American Soccer League.

== Career ==
Lecce played in 1964 with Toronto Italia in the Eastern Canada Professional Soccer League for three seasons. Throughout his tenure with Italia he received the league's MVP award in 1965. In 1967, he played in the American Soccer League with Boston Tigers. He played in the North American Soccer League (NASL) in 1968 with Toronto Falcons. In early 1969, he played with Rochester Lancers in the American Soccer League. The remainder of the season he played in the National Soccer League with former club Toronto Italia. The following season he played with league rivals Toronto Hungaria. In 1971, he returned to the NASL to sign with Toronto Metros from 1971 through 1973.

== International career ==
He played for Canada where he made his debut on October 6, 1968 against Bermuda in a FIFA World Cup qualifying match. He would make eight appearances for the national team.
