= UAST =

UAST may stand for:

- Universal adaptive strategy theory
- University of Applied Science and Technology, in Iran
- UAST Rochester, an American soccer club in Rochester, New York
