= Lecce (surname) =

Lecce is a surname. Notable people with the surname include:

- Elisa Lecce (born 1993), Italian footballer
- Stephen Lecce (born 1986), Canadian politician
- Tony Lecce (born 1945), Italian–born Canadian soccer player
