= Toronto Maple Leafs (disambiguation) =

The Toronto Maple Leafs are a National Hockey League team, based in Toronto, Ontario, Canada.

Toronto Maple Leafs may also refer to:

- Toronto Maple Leafs (Canadian Baseball League)
- Toronto Maple Leafs (International League), a defunct baseball club (1896–1967)
- Toronto Maple Leafs (NLA), a defunct box lacrosse club (1966–1969)
- Toronto Maple Leafs (soccer club), a defunct soccer club
