= 1963 National Soccer League season =

National Soccer League
- Season: 1963
- Champions: Italian Virtus (regular season); Toronto Ukrainia (playoffs, 4th title)

The 1963 National Soccer League season was the fortieth season under the National Soccer League (NSL) name. The season began in late April and concluded in late October with Toronto Ukrainia defeating Toronto Hakoah for the O’Keefe Trophy (NSL Championship). The regular-season title was won by Italian Virtus by finishing first throughout the regular season.

== Overview ==
The creation of the Eastern Canada Professional Soccer League (ECPSL) in 1961 directly affected the National Soccer League (NSL) financially. The competition, including the defection of the top NSL clubs to the ECPSL, caused a major decrease in their match attendance throughout the early 1960s. Their drop in gate earnings at Stanley Park Stadium contributed to their failure to fully pay their tax and loan payments. The club members successfully managed to pay off their taxes from the 1961 season and received an extension from the Toronto Board of Control for the remainder of their debt. The Board of Control further intervened by volunteering to serve as a mediator between the ECPSL and NSL, with the intention of merging both leagues as a solution to the NSL's financial issues. The NSL had hoped to create a two-tiered league with a promotion and relegation format, but the proposal was rejected by the ECPSL ownership.

League membership decreased from twelve to eight members, with several notable clubs departing. A keynoted departure was charter member Toronto Ulster United, which decided to join the amateur ranks in the Toronto and District Soccer League due to financial difficulties. Oshawa Italia and Oshawa Hungaria also returned to the amateur level, and Queen City disbanded its team. Toronto Hakoah, a Jewish-sponsored team, was the sole addition to the circuit. Though the season began with eight members, Toronto Macedonians withdrew from the competition due to financial difficulties and the inability to afford quality players to remain competitive. Several of the top players in the NSL were reported to have been earning $100 a week, while in the ECPSL, top players were earning about $200 per week.

Changes occurred on the administrative side midway through the season as Walter Freer resigned as league president and was succeeded by vice-president Bill Boytchuk. A league scoring record was also set by Toronto Ukrainia after defeating Toronto Macedonians by a score of 16-1.

== Teams ==
Team	City	Stadium	Manager
Italian Virtus	Toronto, Ontario	Stanley Park Stadium	
Toronto Croatia	Toronto, Ontario	Stanley Park Stadium	
Toronto Estonia	Toronto, Ontario	Stanley Park Stadium	Bruno Gerzeli
Toronto Hakoah	Toronto, Ontario	Stanley Park Stadium	
Toronto Hungaria	Toronto, Ontario	Stanley Park Stadium	
Toronto Macedonians (Note: Toronto Macedonians withdrew from league)	Toronto, Ontario	Stanley Park Stadium	
Toronto Olympia	Toronto, Ontario	Stanley Park Stadium	Harry Bogdanow Wally Mrusic
Toronto Ukrainia	Toronto, Ontario	Stanley Park Stadium	

== Standings ==
Pos	Team	Pld	W	D	L	GF	GA	GD	Pts	Qualification
1	Italian Virtus (C)	18	12	3	3	53	13	+40	27	Qualification for Playoffs
2	Toronto Hakoah	18	11	4	3	50	17	+33	26	Qualification for Playoffs
3	Toronto Ukrainians (O)	18	11	2	5	46	27	+19	24	Qualification for Playoffs
4	Toronto Hungaria	18	10	1	7	42	32	+10	21	Qualification for Playoffs
5	Toronto Olympia	18	7	3	8	32	40	−8	17	
6	Toronto Estonia	18	3	4	11	23	47	−24	10	
7	Toronto Croatia	18	0	1	17	17	87	−70	1	

Updated to match(es) played on October 1, 1963. Source: NSL Standings
Rules for classification: 1) points; 2) goal difference; 3) number of goals scored.
(C) Champions; (O) Play-off winners

== Playoffs ==
=== Semifinals ===
October 1, 1963	Toronto Hakoah	3–2	Toronto Hungaria	Toronto, Ontario
	Lefkos 4', 70'; Lou Wolanski 65'	[ Report]	Frank Kili 27'; Vic Ivonyi 77'	Stadium: Stanley Park Stadium; Referee: Bobby Reid

October 4, 1963	Toronto Hungaria	0–5	Toronto Hakoah	Toronto, Ontario
		[ Report]	Lefkos,, Noel Di Castro,	Stadium: Stanley Park Stadium

Toronto Hakoah won the series 2-0.

October 3, 1963	Italian Virtus	0–1	Toronto Ukrainia	Toronto, Ontario
		[ Report]	Leo Dowhaluk 10'	Stadium: Stanley Park Stadium; Referee: Hugh Morrow

October 6, 1963	Toronto Ukrainia	1–0	Italian Virtus	Toronto, Ontario
	Jackie O'Neill 82'	[ Report]		Stadium: Stanley Park Stadium; Referee: Kelly Haupt

Toronto Ukrainia won the series 2-0.

=== Finals ===
October 13, 1963	Toronto Hakoah	0–2	Toronto Ukrainia	Toronto, Ontario
		[ Report]	Jackie O'Neill; John Ihnatowych	Stadium: Stanley Park Stadium

October 20, 1963	Toronto Ukrainia	3–2	Toronto Hakoah	Toronto, Ontario
	Fred Patterson; Leo Dowhaluk; John Ihnatowych	[ Report]	Lefkos; Noel Di Castro	Stadium: Stanley Park Stadium; Attendance: 1200; Referee: Hugh Morrow
