= Sian Przemyśl =

Sports club

Sian Przemyśl (full name: Ukrainian Sports Club Sian Przemyśl) was an ethnic Ukrainian sports club, located in the city of Przemyśl, which in the interbellum period belonged to the Second Polish Republic.

The club was founded in 1929. The team played in the Lwów District League, which was equivalent of today's second level of football games (see: Lower Level Football Leagues in Interwar Poland). Overall, Sian Przemyśl got 24 points in 26 games (with two points for a victory and one for a tie), with goal difference 36:50.

In September 1939, when World War II begun, the club ceased to exist.

In 1942 the club was reactivated. In 1944, after the arrival of Soviet troops in Przemyśl, the club was closed again.

Two of the club's better-known players were Myroslav Turko and Walt Zakaluznyj.
