= Myron Bereza =

Canadian soccer player

Personal information
- Date of birth: August 24, 1936
- Date of death: November 24, 2012 (aged 76)
- Place of death: Toronto, Canada
- Position: Forward

Senior career*
Years	Team	Apps	(Gls)
1950–1955	Toronto Ukrainians		
1955–1956	Rochester Ukrainians		
1956–1966	Toronto Ukrainians		

International career
1957	Canada	2	(0)
- * Club domestic league appearances and goals

Myron Bereza (Ukrainian: Мирон Береза; August 24, 1936 – November 24, 2012) was a Canadian international soccer player who earned two caps for the national team in 1957.

Bereza played club soccer for the Toronto Ukrainians and the Rochester Ukrainians.

Bereza was a Ukrainian immigrant to Canada.
