= 1984 National Soccer League (Canada) season =

National Soccer League
- Season: 1984
- Champions: Toronto Italia (regular season); Toronto Italia (playoffs, 7th title)
- League cup: Toronto Italia

The 1984 National Soccer League season was the sixty-first season under the National Soccer League (NSL) name. The season began in late May, 1984 and concluded in September 1984 with the NSL Championship final where Toronto Italia defeated London Marconi. Toronto Italia would also secure a treble by winning the regular-season title, and the NSL Cup.

== Overview ==
Since the collapse of the short-lived Canadian Professional Soccer League (CPSL) in 1983, the country was without a domestic national league as the Canadian soccer landscape was fractured into several different foreign and regional leagues. The Ontario-centered National Soccer League (NSL) attempted to resurrect the CPSL concept with NSL president Joe Vaccari lobbying the Canadian Soccer Association (CSA) and other groups in support of the idea. The NSL intended to form an eastern conference or function as a minor league to the national league. In response to the national league question, the CSA presented its concept and attempted to recruit the NSL and other parties for input. After reviewing the CSA's blueprint for a national model, the NSL withdrew its support as it was deemed an unstable model by the league owners.

The NSL was also embroiled in a dispute with the Ontario Soccer Association (OSA) over sanctioning issues involving the NSL's under-21 division. The OSA had intentions of forming their youth league and refused to sanction the NSL's version. The NSL, in response, appealed to the CSA for a decision. The membership in the league decreased to six clubs as Toronto First Portuguese were inactive for a season, and London Marconi secured London City's franchise rights. The Hamilton Steelers joined the Inter-City Soccer League and later became a charter member of the Canadian Soccer League in 1987.

=== Teams ===
Team	City	Stadium	Manager
Dinamo Latino	Toronto, Ontario	Lamport Stadium	
London Marconi	London, Ontario	Cove Road Stadium	
St. Catharines Roma	St. Catharines, Ontario	Club Roma Stadium	Ernesto Borges
Toronto Croatia	Etobicoke, Ontario	Centennial Park Stadium	
Toronto Italia	Etobicoke, Ontario	Centennial Park Stadium	Carlo Del Monte
Toronto Panhellenic	Toronto, Ontario	Lamport Stadium	

Location of NSL teams outside of Toronto for the 1984 NSL season.

Location of NSL teams in Toronto for the 1984 NSL season.
