= Burelli =

Burelli is an Italian surname. Notable people with the surname include:

- Guglielmo Burelli (born 1936), Italian footballer
- Miguel Ángel Burelli Rivas (1922–2003), Venezuelan lawyer, diplomat, and politician
