= Mirosław Turko =

Polish-Ukrainian footballer and coach

Mirosław Turko (Ukrainian: Мирослав Пилипович Турко, 2 October 1918 – 29 September 1981) was a Polish - Ukrainian football striker and coach.

He was born in Mostyska, then Austro-Hungary. He played for Ukrainian Sports Club Sian Przemyśl from 1934 to 1939, Rapid Vienna from c. 1940 to 1945 and then Spartak Lviv from 1945 to 1949 and finally OBO Lviv from 1949, where ended his playing career and became a coach for them for many years. He also managed FC Avanhard Ternopil. He died on September 29, 1981, in Lviv.
