= Ivan Marković (footballer, born 1928) =

Croatian football manager (1928–2006)

Personal information
- Date of birth: 6 November 1928
- Place of birth: Senj, Kingdom of Serbs, Croats, and Slovenes
- Date of death: 15 November 2006 (aged 78)
- Place of death: Zagreb, Croatia

Senior career*
Years	Team	Apps	(Gls)
1946–1947	Nehaj Senj		
1948–1958	Poštar Zagreb		
1959–1960	Sava Zagreb		

Managerial career
- 1960: Torpedo Rijeka
- 1961: Kustošija
- 1962: Orijent
- 1967: Zagreb
- 1968–1969: Orijent
- 1973: Maribor
- 1973–1974: Zagreb
- 1975–1976: Toronto Metros-Croatia
- 1976: Yugoslavia Olympic
- 1976–1977: Toronto Italia
- 1977–1978: Marseille
- 1979–1980: Maribor
- 1980: Dinamo Zagreb
- 1982: GOŠK Jug
- 1982–1984: Orijent
- 1985: Sturm Graz
- 1988–1989: Toronto Italia
- 1990–1991: Radnik Velika Gorica
- 1991: Vorwärts Steyr
- 1992: Toronto Italia
- 1993: Potrošnik Beltinci
- 1994: Celje
- 1994–1995: Karlovac
- 1996–1997: Inker
- 1997: Varteks
- 1998–1999: Samobor
- 2000–2001: Radnik Velika Gorica
- 2003: Hamilton Thunder
- * Club domestic league appearances and goals

Ivan "Ðalma" Marković (6 November 1928 – 15 November 2006) was a Croatian footballer and manager.

== Playing career ==
Marković played for lower leagues' clubs Nehaj Senj, Poštar Zagreb and Sava Zagreb.

== Managerial career ==
During his 43-year career as manager, he worked with over 20 teams in Europe and Canada.

== Selected managerial statistics ==
Team	From	To	Record				
Team	From	To	G	W	D	L	Win %
Orijent Rijeka	July 1968	June 1969	30	23	3	4	76.67
Toronto Metros-Croatia	1976	1976	47	28	0	19	59.57
Yugoslavia Olympic	June 1976	June 1976	2	0	1	1	0.00
Toronto Italia	1976	1977	63	39	17	7	61.90
Marseille	July 1977	11 December 1978	67	28	17	22	41.79
Dinamo Zagreb	1 July 1980	25 November 1980	19	5	7	7	26.32
Orijent Rijeka	July 1982	June 1984	59	34	16	9	57.63
Sturm Graz	1 July 1985	12 October 1985	15	5	8	2	33.33
Vorwärts Steyr	20 October 1991	31 December 1991	6	3	0	3	50.00
Inker Zaprešić	19 October 1996	15 March 1997	10	3	1	6	30.00
Varteks	19 April 1997	24 August 1997	13	7	3	3	53.85
Radnik Velika Gorica	1 July 2000	1 June 2001	30	17	4	9	56.67
Total			361	192	77	92	53.19

Note: Statistics from other teams are unavailable.

== Honours ==
Orijent Rijeka

- Yugoslav Second League: 1968–69
- Croatian Republic Football League: 1983–84

Toronto Italia

- Canadian National Soccer League: 1976, 1988, 1989, 1992

Individual

- CFF Youth Trophy: 1994
