= Anders Yrfeldt =

Danish footballer and manager (born 1938)

Personal information
- Date of birth: 11 April 1938 (age 88)
- Place of birth: Copenhagen, Denmark
- Position: Forward

Senior career*
Years	Team	Apps	(Gls)
1956–1961	Boldklubben af 1893	76	(12)
1961–1962	FC Lugano	15	(1)
1963–1966	Toronto Italia		
1967	Rochester Lancers		
1967	Toronto Inter–Roma		
1968	Sudbury Italia		
1969	Toronto Italia		
1970	Serbian White Eagles		
1971	Toronto First Portuguese		
1972–1973	Toronto San Fili		

Managerial career
- 1969: Toronto Italia
- 1969: Toronto Italia (indoor)
- 1972–1973: Toronto San Fili
- * Club domestic league appearances and goals

Anders Yrfeldt (born 11 April 1938) is a Danish former footballer and football manager.

== Career ==
Yrfeldt played in the Danish 1st Division in 1956 with Boldklubben af 1893. In 1961, he played abroad in Switzerland in the Nationalliga A with FC Lugano. In 1963, he played in the Eastern Canada Professional Soccer League with Toronto Italia. He was selected to the Toronto All-Star team that faced a Greek All-Star team, which consisted of players from various Greek clubs. In his debut season he assisted in securing the double (regular and playoff championship) for Toronto. The following season he extended his contract for another three seasons. He would contribute to another playoff championship in 1965, and an additional regular season title in 1966.

In 1967, he played in the American Soccer League with the Rochester Lancers. For the remainder of the 1967 season he played in the National Soccer League with Toronto Inter-Roma. The following season he was transferred to Sudbury Italia, where he assisted in securing the NSL Championship. In 1969, he returned to Toronto Italia, where he served as a player-coach. In 1970, he saw action with the Serbian White Eagles FC, and in 1971 with the Toronto First Portuguese. In 1972, he played in the Toronto and District League with Toronto San Fili.

== Managerial career ==
In 1969, he served as a player-coach for Toronto Italia in the National Soccer League, where he secured the National League Cup after defeating Toronto Hungaria. In the indoor season he managed the Toronto Italians in the International Indoor Soccer League in 1969. In 1972, he served once more in the capacity of a player-coach with Toronto San Fili in the Toronto and District League, where he reached the finals of the Challenge Trophy. The following season he led San Fili to the Ontario Cup finals, but were defeated by Toronto West Indies United.

In 1973, he was named the general manager for the Toronto Indoor Soccer League. In 1981, he was the general manager for Toronto Italia, and in 1984 served as the sports director for Toronto.

== Honours ==
=== Player ===
Sudbury Italia

- NSL Championship: 1968

=== Manager ===
Toronto Italia

- National League Cup: 1969

Toronto San Fili

- Ontario Cup: 1972
