= Richmond Green (Richmond Hill, Ontario) =

Public sports facility in Richmond Hill, Ontario, Canada

Coordinates: 43.90018°N 79.40125°W

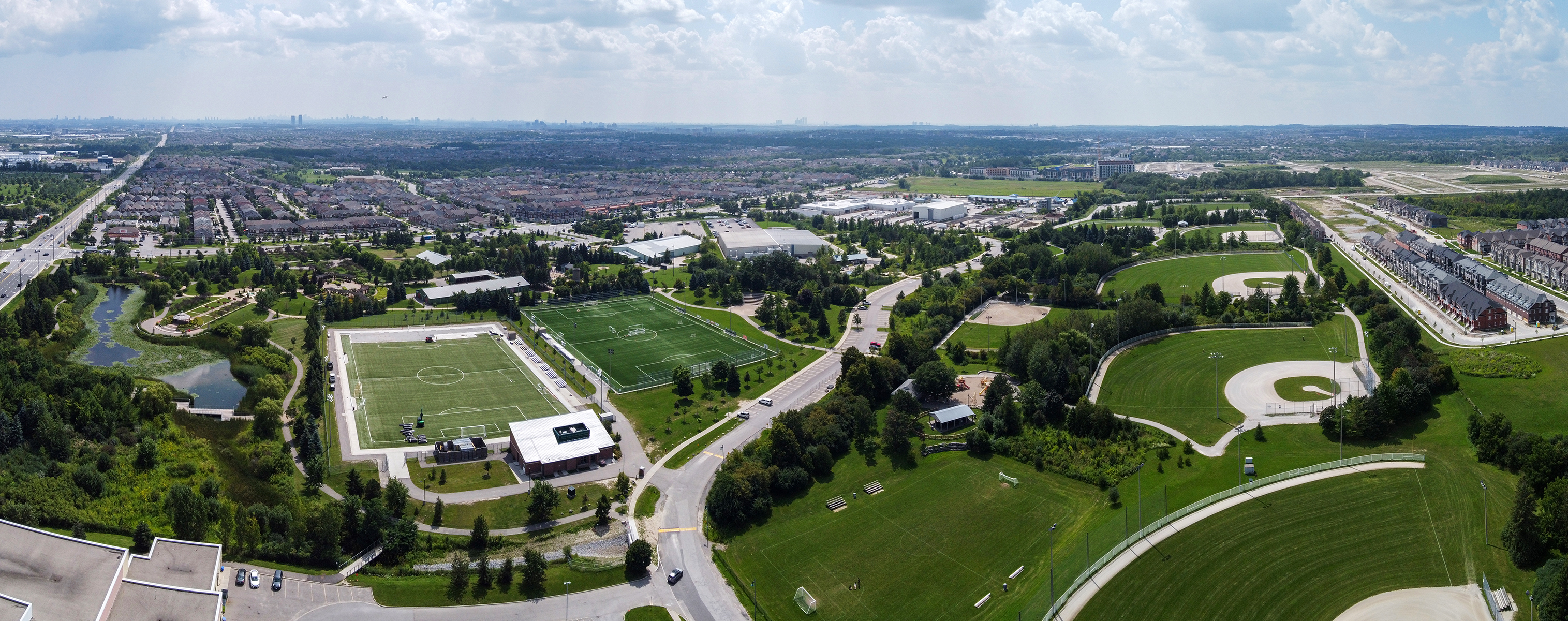
Aerial view of Richmond Green in 2023

Richmond Green, also known as the Richmond Green Sports Centre and Park, is a city-owned and operated facility in Richmond Hill, Ontario, Canada. It is located on 102 acres (0.41 km^{2}) of land on the northwest corner of Leslie Street and Elgin Mills Road. Next to Richmond Green to its north is Richmond Green Secondary School and Richmond Green Public Library.

== Amenities ==
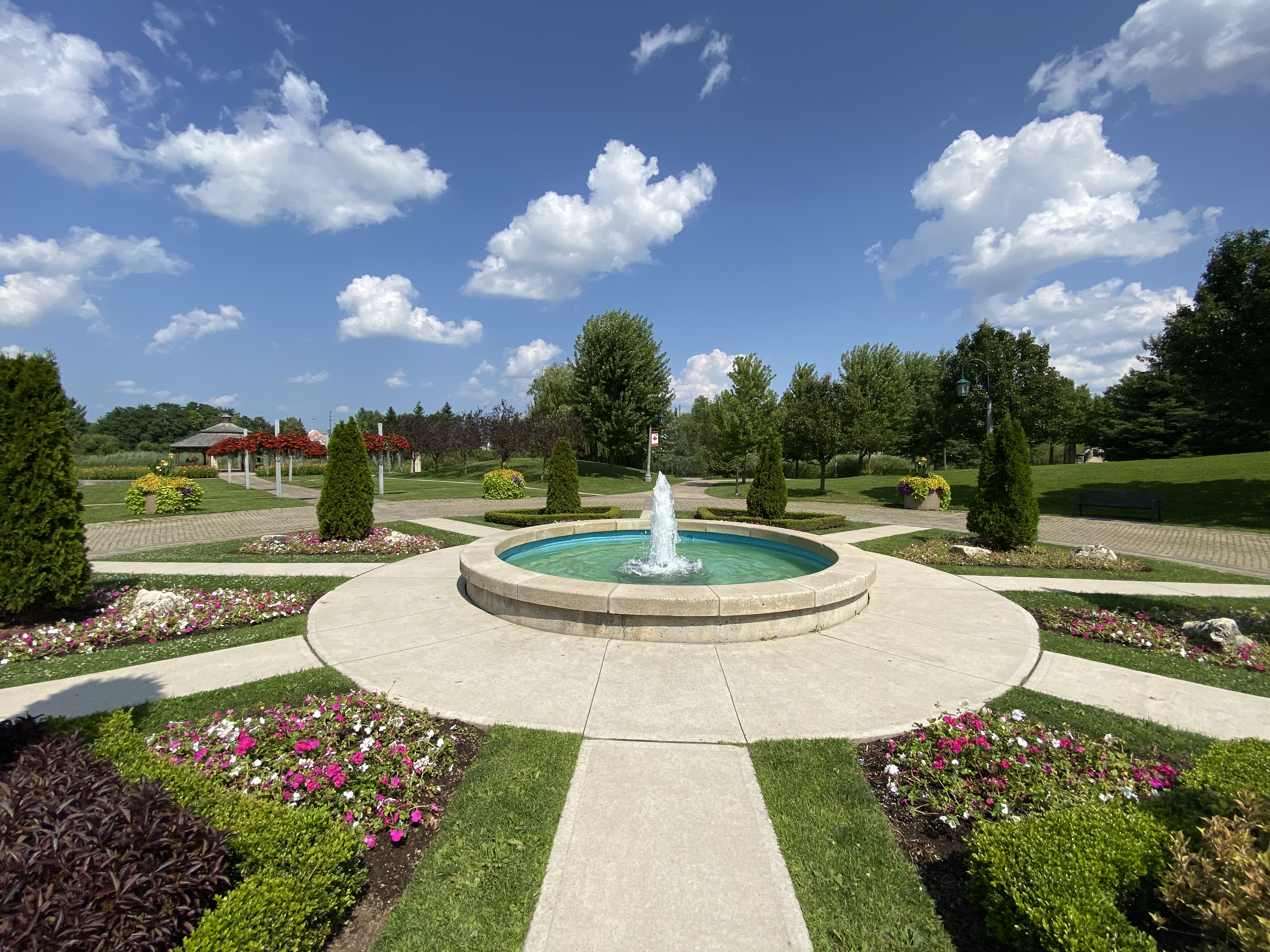
Village Walk

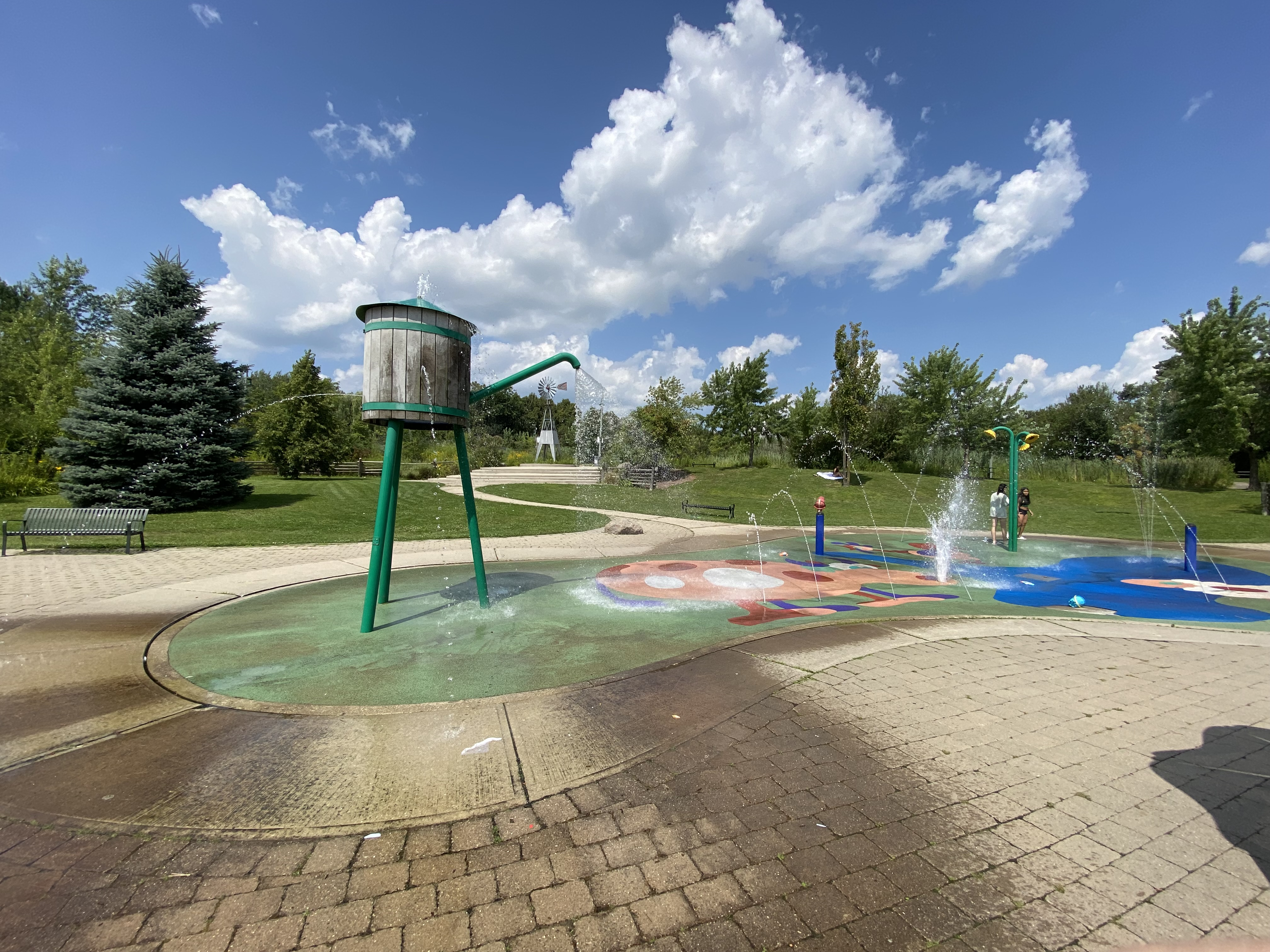
Splash Pad

Some of the facilities and activities offered at the Centre include:

- Tom Graham Arena (2 ice pads)
- Sports Hall of Fame
- 4 softball diamonds
- 3 baseball diamonds
- 2 soccer turf pitches. One pitch is to FIFA regulation. The same pitch is able to accommodate two 9v9 games. This pitch is also covered with an air-supported_structure for the winter. Install usually takes place in October and the Sport Dome is removed in April.
- soccer leagues
- open picnic areas with shelters
- 2 agricultural barns and paddocks
- indoor lawn bowling league
- skatepark
- waterplay park
