= Jose Luis Alves =

Portuguese footballer

José Luís
Personal information
- Full name: José Luís Alves
- Place of birth: Portugal
- Position: Forward

Senior career*
Years	Team	Apps	(Gls)
1968–1969	Atlético Clube de Portugal	4	(0)
1969–1971	Toronto First Portuguese		
1971	→Toronto Metros (loan)		
- * Club domestic league appearances and goals

Jose Luis Alves is a Portuguese former footballer who played as a forward.

== Career ==
Alves played in the Primeira Divisão in 1968 with Atlético Clube de Portugal. In 1969, he played abroad in the National Soccer League with Toronto First Portuguese. In his debut season with Toronto, he assisted in securing the NSL Championship. He also finished as the league's top goalscorer with 18 goals.

In 1970, he assisted Toronto in securing the NSL Cup by scoring a goal against Toronto Hellas. He returned to play with First Portuguese for the 1971 season.

In July 1971, he was loaned to the Toronto Metros of the North American Soccer League because of a player shortage due to injuries. He played in a friendly match with the Metros against Apollon Smyrnis F.C. on July 28, 1971.
