= Toronto Tridents =

Toronto USC Tridents
- Full name: Ukrainian Sports Club Toronto Tridents
- Nickname: The Tridents

Toronto USC Tridents (Ukrainian Sports Club Tridents, Ukrainian: УСК (Український Спортовий Клуб) «Тризуб» (Торонто), romanized: USK (Ukrainskyi Sportovyi Klub) "Tryzub" (Toronto)) is a Canadian soccer team based in Toronto. The club was founded by Ukrainians that had been settled in Toronto after the second world war.

== History ==
The club has had a very storied history, considering it was formed by the Ukrainian diaspora group. The team played in the National Soccer League until 1960, at which time it ceased playing in the league.

== Year-by-year ==
Year	Division	League	Regular season	Playoffs
1953	"1"	NSL	4th	
1954	"1"	NSL	6th	
1955	"1"	NSL	7th	
1956	"1"	NSL	4th	
1957	"1"	NSL	6th	
1958	"1"	NSL	9th	
1959	"1"	NSL	11th	
1960	"1"	NSL	13th	

== Notable players ==
- Aleksandar Arangelovic
- Walter Bobinec
- Michel Campo
- Jack McKinnon
- Frank Pike
- Ted Virba
- Juan Warecki
- Ostap Steckiw
- Oleksandr Skotsen (Skocen)
