= Toronto Maple Leafs (soccer club) =

Canadian soccer club

Toronto Maple Leafs were a Canadian soccer club based in Toronto, Ontario. They won multiple league titles and reached the National League Championship for the Atholstan Trophy in 1940.

Over the course of their soccer history, they played in several leagues and competitions in Ontario. They played in the National League up until 1941 before the league suspended operations during the Second World War. The Maple Leafs officially suspended their operations in May 1942. They returned to action in 1951, first in the Toronto & District League and afterwards in the Toronto Metropolitan League. Their last major season was 1959.

== Season-by-season records ==
Toronto Maple Leafs season-by-season record in the National League before the league suspended operations during the Second World War.

Note: MP = Matches played, W = Wins, D = Draws, L = Losses, Pts = Points, GF = Goals for, GA = Goals against

Season	MP	W	D	L	Pts	League	NSL Playoffs	City (Consols)	Ontario Cup	Canada playoffs
1928 NSL	18	6	6	6	18	8th in NSL-ON	-	-	-	-
1929 NSL	17	5	3	9	13	8th in NSL-ON	-	-	-	-
1930 NSL	14	3	1	10	7	8th in NSL-ON	-	-	-	-
1931 NSL	13	6	2	5	14	4th in NSL-ON	-	-	-	-
1932 NSL	13	5	3	5	13	4th in NSL-ON	-	-	-	-
1933 NSL	28	11	10	7	32	4th in NSL-ON	-	-	-	-
1934 NSL	26	7	4	15	18	8th in NSL-ON	-	-	-	-
1935 NSL	21	10	2	9	22	4th in NSL-ON	-	-	-	-
1936 NSL	23	10	4	9	24	4th in NSL-ON	-	-	-	-
1937 NSL	18	10	4	4	24	3rd in NSL-ON	-	-	-	-
1938 NSL	24	9	8	7	26	2nd in NSL-ON	-	-	-	-
1939 NSL	24	5	3	16	13	7th in NSL-ON	-	-	-	-
1940 NSL	10	6	3	1	15	1st in NSL-ON	Won Ontario playoff, Lost Atholstan Cup	-	District Semifinals	-
1940 City	8	2	3	3	7	3rd City League	-	-	-	-
1941 NSL	20	13	4	3	30	1st in NSL-ON	Lost Ontario playoff	-	-	-

After the second World War, the Toronto Maple Leafs played in the Toronto & District League and afterwards the Toronto Metropolitan League.

Note: MP = Matches played, W = Wins, D = Draws, L = Losses, Pts = Points

Season	MP	W	D	L	Pts	TDFA	Playoffs	City (Consols)	Canada playoffs
1951 TDFA	?	?	?	?	?	1st in TDFA	Semifinals	?	Ontario 4th Round
Season	MP	W	D	L	Pts	Metro League	Playoff or Innes Cup	City (Consols)	Canada playoffs
1952 TML	?	?	?	?	?	?	Missed playoffs, Innes Runners up	3rd Round	-
1953 TML	21	14	4	3	32	1st in TML	Playoff runners up	Quarterfinals	-
1954 TML	18	11	3	4	25	2nd	Playoff Semifinals	1st Round	Ontario 1st Round
1955 TML	?	?	?	?	?	8th	Missed playoffs	2nd Round	-
1956 TML	?	?	?	?	?	?	??	-	-
1957 TML	?	?	?	?	?	3rd	Innes Semifinals	1st Round	-
1958 TML	14	2	3	9	7	7th	Innes Group stage	2nd Round	-
1959 TML	?	?	?	?	?	?	-	3rd Round	-

== Honours ==
National
Competitions	Titles	Seasons
Canadian National Soccer League Ontario Section	2	1940, 1941
Toronto & District League, Major Division	1	1951
Toronto Metropolitan League	1	1953

== Notable former players ==
Two former Toronto Maple Leafs have been inducted into the Canada Soccer Hall of Fame as honoured players.

- (Canada) Dick Arends
- (Canada) Harry Phillips
