= Toronto City =

Defunct soccer club in Canada

- Full name: Toronto City Soccer Club
- Founded: 1961
- Dissolved: 1967
- Stadium: Varsity Stadium
- Owners: Larry Myslivec, Ed Fitken and Steve Stavro

Toronto City was a Canadian soccer team based in Toronto, Ontario. Between 1961 and 1967, teams using this name competed in both the Eastern Canada Professional Soccer League and the United Soccer Association.

== History ==
=== ECPSL ===
In 1961, along with industrialist Larry Myslivec and journalist Ed Fitken, Steve Stavro, a Macedonian Canadian businessman who would go on to own Maple Leaf Sports & Entertainment, formed the Toronto City Soccer Club which played in the newly created Eastern Canada Professional Soccer League. During its inaugural season the team featured several prominent soccer players including Northern Ireland international Danny Blanchflower, England internationals Stanley Matthews and Johnny Haynes and Scottish internationals Jackie Mudie and Tommy Younger, notable as the last time the England, Scotland and Northern Ireland captains played on the same side. Younger also coached the team. City won the league in 1964, and in November of that year they offered the role of "manager-coach" to Stan Cullis. In January 1966 Stavro fell out with the league administrators and withdrew the team from the league.

=== United States ===
In 1966 Stavro helped form the United Soccer Association and entered a team called Toronto City in the new league. The USA originally intended to launch its league in the spring of 1968. However a rival league, the National Professional Soccer League, announced it was ready to launch in 1967. Not wanting to lose ground to its rival, the USA decided to fast track its launch. Without any players of its own, it opted to import whole teams from Europe and South America. It was intended that these teams would represent the franchises during the inaugural season, giving them time to build their own squads for the following season. Toronto City was subsequently represented by Hibernian of the Scottish Football League.

Together with Cleveland Stokers, Detroit Cougars, New York Skyliners, Boston Rovers and Washington Whips, City competed in the Eastern Division. These teams were actually Stoke City, Glentoran, C.A. Cerro, Shamrock Rovers and Aberdeen respectively. City eventually finished third, behind the Stokers and the Whips. In December 1967 the US and the NPSL merged to form the North American Soccer League. As a result of this merger some of the USA franchises, including Toronto City folded. This was partly to avoid cities having more than one club in the new NASL, and City lost out to its NPSL rival Toronto Falcons. Stavro sold his team back to the league for $160,000.

== Season-by-season record ==
Note: MP = Matches played, W = Wins, D = Draws, L = Losses, Pts = Points

Toronto City FC in the Eastern Canada Professional Soccer League.

Season	Division	MP	W	D	L	Pts	League	Playoff Record	Playoffs
1961	ECPSL	24	11	3	10	25	1st in ECPSL	1W-1D-1L	Lost Semifinals
1962	ECPSL	24	8	7	9	23	2nd in ECPSL	1W-0D-1L	Lost Final
1963	ECPSL	24	2	6	16	10	6th in ECPSL	-	Missed playoffs
1964	ECPSL	24	14	6	4	34	1st in ECPSL	4W-0D-0L	Won President's Cup
1965	ECPSL	24	5	6	13	16	5th in ECPSL	-	Missed playoffs

- In 1967, Hibernian SC played as Toronto City SC in the United Soccer Association (4W-3D-3L in 12 matches).

== Head coaches ==
- (Scotland) Tommy Younger
- (England) Malcolm Allison
- (Scotland) Bob Shankly (1967)
