= Rochester Ukrainians =

Defunct association football club

- Full name: Ukrainian American Sports Association Rochester
- Nickname: The Ukrainians

Rochester Ukrainians (Ukrainian American Sports Association Rochester, Ukrainian: УАСТ (Українсько-Американське Спортове Товариство) (Рочестер), romanized: UAST (Ukrainsko-Amerykanske Sportove Tovarystvo) (Rochester)) is an American soccer club based in Rochester, New York. The club was founded by Ukrainians that had been settled in the Rochester after World War II.

== Honours ==
- National Amateur Cup Runner-Up: 1

1957
