= Hamilton Steelers (1958–1967) =

Canadian soccer team

The Hamilton Steelers were a soccer team in Hamilton, Ontario, Canada. The team was known as Hamilton Italo-Canadian Soccer Club from 1958 to 1960 when they played in the National Soccer League, then switched their name to the Steelers in 1961 when they joined the Eastern Canada Professional Soccer League. According to the Hamilton Spectator, the club was "incorporated in 1959 and capitalized at $200,000 with common shares bearing a par value of $1." In 1961, major shareholders were John Agro and Arnold Martini.

In November 1964, Primo Polianato took over as the club's major shareholder and subsequently renamed the club Primo Hamilton Soccer Club. The club remained in the Eastern Canada Professional Soccer League through 1966, then rejoined the National Soccer League in 1967 after the amalgamation of the two leagues.

== Year-by-year ==
Year	Division	League	Regular season	Playoffs
1958	1	NSL	13th / 15 teams	–
1959	1	NSL	5 / 14	– (Note: Challenge Trophy semifinalist.)
1960	1	NSL	6 / 13	–
1961	1	ECPSL	3 / 4	Semifinals
1962	1	ECPSL	4 / 5	Semifinals
1963	1	ECPSL	2 / 6	Semifinals
1964	1	ECPSL	4 / 5	Semifinals
1965	1	ECPSL	4 / 5	Runner-Up
1966	1	ECPSL	3 / 4	Semifinals
1967	1	NSL	1 / 12	Runner-Up

== Coaches ==
- Hugh McLean

== See also ==
- Hamilton Steelers (1986–1992)
