= Montreal Ukrainians =

- Full name: Sports Association Montreal Ukrainians
- Nickname: The Ukrainians
- Founded: 1949

Montreal Ukrainians (Sports Association Montreal Ukrainians, Ukrainian: СТ (Спортове Товариство) «Україна» (Монреаль), romanized: ST (Sportove Tovarystvo) "Ukraina" (Monreal)) is a Canadian soccer team based in Montreal. The club was founded by Ukrainians that had settled in Montreal after the Second World War.

== History ==
The club has had a very storied history, considering it was formed by such the Ukrainian diaspora group in 20 November 1949. The team primarily played in the National Soccer League until 1964, although it spent the 1963 season in the Eastern Canada Professional Soccer League.

== Year-by-year ==
Year	Division	League	Regular season	Playoffs
1959	"1"	NSL	10th	
1960	"1"	NSL	11th	
1961	?	?	?	
1962	?	?	?	
1964	"1"	NSL	8th	

== Honours ==
- Canada Soccer Football Championship
  - Winners (1): 1957 Carling’s Red Cap Trophy / Challenge Trophy
  - Runners up (2): 1955, 1969
- Amateur Montreal League Champions: 7

1950, 1956, 1958, 1961, 1965, 1969

- Amateur Quebec Championship League Champions: 7

1955, 1957, 1969, 1972, 1978, 1979, 1980

== See also ==
- Toronto Ukrainians
