= Toronto Falcons (1967–1968) =

- Full name: Toronto Falcons
- Nickname: The Falcons
- Founded: 1967
- Dissolved: 1968
- Stadium: Varsity Stadium, Toronto, Ontario, Canada
- Capacity: 22,000
- Chairman: Joseph Peters
- Head coach: László Kubala
- League: NPSL (1967); NASL (1968)
- 1967/68: NASL Western Division, 4th
colours	Away colours

The Toronto Falcons were a soccer team based in Toronto, Ontario, Canada. They played only two years, 1967 in the National Professional Soccer League (NPSL) and 1968 in the North American Soccer League (NASL). Their home field was Varsity Stadium.

During the 1967 season, while still in the NPSL, the Falcons drew an average of 3,792 people per game. Toronto's record for the 1967 season was a bearable 10–5–17. The following season, the NPSL merged with the United Soccer Association to form the NASL. Their intercity rival, Toronto City, of USL folded in the process after only one year.

In the NASL, with the legendary László Kubala as their coach, the Falcons played well collecting a 13–6–13 record, but financial troubles caused the club (along with 11 others) to fold. Their average attendance for the 1968 season was 5,336 people per game. The NASL would return to Toronto in 1971 in the form of the Toronto Metros.

== Year-by-year ==
Year	League	W	L	T	Pts	Reg. season	Playoffs
1967	NPSL	10	17	5	127	4th, Western Division	Did not qualify
1968	NASL	13	13	6	144	3rd, Lakes Division	Did not qualify

== Players ==
During the 1967 season, the Falcons were able to sign Bill Brown a Scottish goalkeeper who received 28 international caps in his career. Tony Lecce was a defender and Canadian international. Defender Guglielmo Burelli played over 150 games in the Serie A, including one season for Juventus FC Other players worth noting are Iris DeBrito and Yanko Daucik both prolific goal scorers, and John Lima from the first Spanish league. The team became something of a family affair with the addition of Daucik's brother in law László Kubala (player/coach) and nephew Branko Kubala to the squad, not to mention Yanko's father Ferdinand Daučík served as the head coach. In 1968, Salvadoran international Raúl Magaña appeared for the club.

== Coaches ==
- (Slovakia) Fernando Daucik
- (Argentina) Hector Marinaro, Sr.
- (Hungary) (Spain) (Slovakia) László Kubala
