= Toronto Ukrainians =

- Full name: Sports Association Toronto Ukrainians
- Nicknames: The Ukrainians, red-black
- Founded: 1948
Home colours	Away colours

Toronto Ukrainians (Sports Association Toronto Ukrainians, Ukrainian: СТ (Спортове Товариство) «Україна» (Торонто), romanized: ST (Sportove Tovarystvo) "Ukraina" (Toronto)) is a Canadian soccer team. The club was founded on June 30, 1948 by Ukrainians that had been settled in the Toronto after World War II.

The team's colours are red and black, similar to those of the flag of the UPA and yellow, similar to those of the Ukraine national team.

== History ==
The team has had a very storied history, considering it was formed by a small diaspora group in spring 1948. In beginning was calling Skala. The club was founded on 30 June 1948. The team played in the National Soccer League until 1981. During this period the team attracted many soccer stars, such as Ostap Steckiw, Walt Zakaluznyj and Myron Bereza who played for the Canada national team.

Throughout its history Toronto Ukrainians has hosted international friendly matches with a teams such as Heart of Midlothian F.C., Rangers F.C., Tottenham Hotspur F.C., West Bromwich Albion F.C., Admira Wien, Rapid Wien and Wacker Wien.

== Year-by-year ==
Year	Division	League	Regular season	Playoffs
1950	"1"	NSL	5th	
1951	"1"	NSL	3rd	Winner
1952	"1"	NSL	4th	
1953	"1"	NSL	1st	Winner
1954	"1"	NSL	1st	
1955	"1"	NSL	1st	
1956	"1"	NSL	6th	
1957	"1"	NSL	8th	
1958	"1"	NSL	5th	
1959	"1"	NSL	3rd	
1960	"1"	NSL	7th	
1961	"1"	NSL	5th	Winner
1962	"1"	NSL	2nd	
1963	"1"	NSL	3rd	Winner
1964	"1"	NSL	1st	Winner
1965	"1"	NSL	1st	Runner-Up
1966	"1"	NSL	1st	
1967	"1"	NSL	11th	
1968	?	?	?	
1969	?	?	?	
1970	"1"	NSL	11th	
1971	"1"	NSL	4th	
1972	"1"	NSL	6th	
1973	"1"	NSL	11th	
1974	"1"	NSL	16th	
1975	"2"	NSL	9th	
1976	"?"	NSL	?	
1977	"?"	NSL	?	
1978	"2"	NSL	5th	
1979	"1"	NSL	12th	
1980	"1"	NSL	9th	
1981	"1"	NSL	11th	

== Honours ==
- National Soccer League
  - NSL Playoff Champions: 5

1951, 1953, 1961, 1963, 1964

  - NSL Playoff Runner-Up: 1

1965

  - NSL Champions: 6

1953, 1954, 1955, 1964, 1965, 1966

  - NSL Runner-Up: 1

1962

== See also ==
- Ukraina Lwów
- Montreal Ukrainians
