= Canadian National Soccer League =

Canadian soccer league (1926–1997)

- Founded: 1926; 100 years ago
- Folded: 1997; 29 years ago
- Country: Canada
- Confederation: CONCACAF
- Promotion to: None
- Relegation to: None
- Most championships: Play-off: Toronto Italia & Toronto Ulster United FC (8 titles); Regular Season: Montréal Carsteel FC (11 titles)

The National Soccer League was a soccer league in Canada that existed from 1926 to 1997. Teams were primarily based in the provinces of Ontario and Quebec. The league was renamed to Canadian National Soccer League in 1993 following the folding of the Canadian Soccer League, and the accepting of the Winnipeg Fury, making the league more national. In the 1960s, the National Soccer League was one of four major leagues in Canadian soccer alongside the Pacific Coast League, the Eastern Canada Professional Soccer League and the Western Canada Soccer League.

It was replaced by the Canadian Professional Soccer League in 1998, after an agreement between the CNSL and the Ontario Soccer Association.

== NSL/CNSL champions ==
Season	Playoff champions	Score	Playoff runners-up	Regular season champions	Runners-up	Cup
1926	Toronto Ulster United FC	5–1 /1-0	Montréal Maroons	Toronto Ulster United FC	Montréal Maroons	NSL Cup: Toronto Ulster United FC
1927	Not completed					
1928	Montréal CNR	1–2 / 4–0	Toronto Ulster United FC	Eastern: National Breweries; Western: Hamilton Thistles	Eastern: Montreal CNR; Western: Toronto Scottish FC	
1929	Montréal CNR	1–0 / 3–2	Toronto Ulster United FC	Eastern: Montréal CNR; Western: Toronto Ulster United FC	Eastern: Montréal Carsteel FC; Western: Hamilton Thistles	
1930	Toronto Scottish FC	1–1 / 4–3	Montréal CNR	Eastern: Montréal CNR; Western: Toronto Scottish FC	Eastern: Montréal Carsteel FC; Western: Toronto CNR	
1931	Toronto Scottish FC	2–1 / 2–2	Montréal Carsteel FC	Eastern: Montréal Carsteel FC; Western: Toronto Scottish FC	Eastern: Montreal CPR; Western: Toronto Ulster United FC	
1932	Toronto Ulster United FC	4–3 / 3–1	Montréal Carsteel FC	Eastern: Montréal Carsteel FC; Western: Toronto Ulster United FC	Eastern: Montréal CNR; Western: Hamilton City	
1933	Toronto Ulster United FC	5–0 / 3–2	Montréal Carsteel FC	Eastern: Montréal Carsteel FC; Western: Toronto Scottish FC	Eastern: Emard St. Paul; Western: Toronto Ulster United FC	
1934	Toronto Ulster United FC	2–0 / 3–2	Montréal Carsteel FC	Eastern: Montréal Carsteel FC; Western: Toronto Ulster United FC	Eastern: Hamilton United; Western: Toronto British Consols	
1935	Frood Mines	3–1	Toronto Ulster United FC	Eastern: Montréal Aldred; Northern:Frood Mines; Western: Toronto Ulster United FC	Eastern: Emard St. Paul; Northern: Western: Toronto Scottish FC	
1936	Montréal Carsteel FC	5–3 / 1–0	Toronto Ulster United FC	Eastern: Montréal Carsteel FC; Northern:Falconbridge FC; Western: Hamilton Thistles	Eastern: Notre Dame de Grace; Northern:Frood Mines; Western: Toronto British Consols	
1937	Toronto British Consols	1–3 / 5–1	Falconbridge FC	Eastern: CNR Scottish; Northern:Falconbridge FC; Western: Toronto British Consols	Eastern: Montréal Carsteel FC; Northern:Frood Mines; Western: Toronto Ulster United FC	
1938	Montréal Royal Victoria Hospital	w/o	Toronto Ulster United FC	Eastern: Montréal Carsteel FC; Western: Toronto Ulster United FC	Eastern: Montréal Royal Victoria Hospital; Western: Toronto Maple Leafs	
1939	Montréal Royal Victoria Hospital	w/o	Toronto British Consols	Eastern: Montréal Carsteel FC; Western: Toronto Ulster United FC	Eastern: Montréal Royal Victoria Hospital; Western: Toronto British Consols	
1940	Montréal Carsteel FC	3–2 / 2–2	Toronto Maple Leafs	Eastern: Montréal Carsteel FC; Western: Toronto Maple Leafs	Eastern: Maisonneuve Rovers; Western: England United	
1941	Toronto Ulster United FC	0–1 / 2–0	Montréal Carsteel FC	Eastern: Montréal Carsteel FC; Western: Toronto Maple Leafs	Eastern: Montréal Wings; Western: Toronto Ulster United FC	
1942–46	Not played during World War II.					
1947	Toronto Greenbacks			Montréal Stelco	Toronto Ulster United FC	
1948	Montréal Carsteel FC	3–1 / 3–3	Hamilton Westinghouse	Eastern: Montréal Carsteel FC; Western: Hamilton Westinghouse	Eastern: Canadair Falcons; Western:	
1949	Toronto East End Canadians	7–1 / 4–1	Montréal Carsteel FC	Eastern: Montréal Carsteel FC; Western: Toronto East End Canadians	Eastern: Montréal Stelco; Western: Hamilton Westinghouse	
1950	Hamilton Westinghouse	3–2 / 1–1	Montréal Canadian Falcons	Eastern: Montréal Canadian Falcons; Western: Hamilton Westinghouse	Eastern: Westmount; Western: Toronto St. Andrews	
1951	Toronto Ukraina	1–0	Toronto East End Canadians	Toronto St. Andrews	Toronto Ulster United FC	Dominion Cup: Toronto Ulster United FC
1952	Toronto Ulster United FC		Toronto St. Andrews	Toronto East End Canadians	Toronto Hungaria	Arnold Cup: Toronto Ukraina
1953	Toronto Ukraina			Toronto Ukraina	Toronto Ulster United FC	
1954	Toronto Ulster United FC	2–1 / 0–1 / 6–0	Polish White Eagles	Toronto Ukraina	Toronto Ulster United FC	
1955	Toronto Ulster United FC		Polish White Eagles	Toronto Ukraina	Toronto Ulster United FC	
1956	Polish White Eagles	2–1 / 2–2	Toronto Italia FC	Polish White Eagles	Toronto Italia FC	
1957	Toronto Italia FC	1–0 / 1–1 / 1–2 / 2–0	Toronto Hungaria	Toronto Italia FC	Polish White Eagles	
1958	Montréal Hungaria	2–2 / 2–2	Toronto Italia FC	Montréal Hungaria	Toronto Italia FC	
1959	Toronto Italia FC	1–0 / 1–1	Montréal Cantalia FC	Montréal Cantalia FC	Toronto Italia FC	
1960	Toronto Italia FC	2–2 / 0–0 / 4–2	Montréal Cantalia FC	Toronto Italia FC	Toronto Sparta	
1961	Toronto Ukraina	1–0 / 1–0	Toronto Hungaria	Toronto Roma FC	Montréal Concordia	
1962	Italian Virtus	2–0 / 2–3	Toronto Ukraina	Olympia-Harmonie	Toronto Ukraina	
1963	Toronto Ukraina	2–0 / 3–2	Toronto Hakoah	Italian Virtus	Toronto Hakoah	
1964	Toronto Ukraina	1–0 / 4–1	Toronto Abruzzi	Toronto Ukraina	Montréal Cantalia FC	
1965	Toronto Hakoah	2–3 / 3–1	Toronto Ukraina	Toronto Ukraina	Toronto Hakoah	
1966	Windsor Teutonia	1–1 / 1–0	Toronto Croatia	Sudbury Italia	Toronto Hellas	
1967	Windsor Teutonia	3–1 / 1–0	Hamilton Primos	Hamilton Primos	Toronto Roma FC	
1968	Sudbury Italia		Toronto Hellas	Sudbury Italia	Toronto Hellas	
1969		no play-off		Toronto First Portuguese	Toronto Hellas	NSL Cup: Toronto Italia
1970	Hamilton Croatia	3–0	Toronto Croatia	Toronto Croatia	Hamilton Croatia	NSL Cup: Toronto First Portuguese
1971	Toronto Croatia	1–0	Toronto First Portuguese	Toronto Croatia	Toronto First Portuguese	Canadian Open Cup: Toronto Croatia; NSL Cup: Toronto First Portuguese
1972	Toronto Italia		Serbian White Eagles	Toronto Croatia	Serbian White Eagles	Canadian Open Cup: Toronto Croatia; NSL Cup: Toronto Croatia
1973	Toronto Hungaria	2–1	Toronto Croatia	Toronto Croatia	Serbian White Eagles	Canadian Open Cup: Toronto Croatia; NSL Cup: Toronto Hungaria
1974	Toronto Croatia	1–0	Toronto Homer	Serbian White Eagles	Toronto Homer	Canadian Open Cup: Serbian White Eagles; NSL Cup: Toronto Italia
1975		no play-off		Toronto Italia	Toronto First Portuguese	Canadian Open Cup: Toronto Italia; NSL Cup: Toronto Croatia
1976	Toronto First Portuguese	2–0 / 2–1	Toronto Italia	Toronto Italia	Montréal Castors	NSL Cup: Toronto Panhellenic
1977		no play-off		Montréal Castors	Toronto Italia	NSL Cup: Toronto Panhellenic
1978	Toronto Falcons		Hamilton Italo-Canadians	Montréal Castors	Toronto First Portuguese	NSL Cup: Toronto Falcons
1979		no play-off		Toronto First Portuguese	Toronto Falcons	NSL Cup: Toronto First Portuguese
1980	Toronto Panhellenic	1–0	St. Catharines Roma	Toronto Falcons	Toronto First Portuguese	NSL Cup: Toronto Italia
1981	Hamilton Steelers		Toronto Italia	Hamilton Steelers	Toronto Panhellenic	NSL Cup: Hamilton Steelers
1982	Hamilton Steelers	2–1 / 1–1	Toronto Italia	Toronto Italia	Hamilton Steelers	NSL Cup: Toronto Italia
1983	Toronto Italia	0–2 / 2–0 (4–3 p.)	Dinamo Latino	Toronto Panhellenic	Toronto Italia	NSL Cup: Toronto Italia
1984	Toronto Italia		London Marconi	Toronto Italia		NSL Cup: Toronto Italia
1985	Toronto Italia	1–1 / 1–0	Windsor Roma	London Marconi	Dinamo Latino	NSL Cup: Dinamo Latino
1986	Toronto Italia	1–0	Toronto Blizzard	Toronto Blizzard	Toronto Italia	NSL Cup: Toronto Blizzard; NSL Canadian Championship: Toronto Blizzard; NSL Canada Cup: Toronto Blizzard
1987	Toronto Italia	2–0	London Marconi	Windsor Wheels	Toronto Croatia	NSL Cup: Toronto Italia; NSL Canadian Championship: Windsor Wheels; NSL Canada Cup: Toronto Italia
1988	Toronto Croatia		Toronto Italia	Toronto Italia	Toronto Panhellenic	NSL Cup: Toronto Croatia; NSL Canadian Championship: Toronto Italia; NSL Canada Cup: Corfinium de St-Léonard
1989		no play-off		Toronto Italia	Toronto Croatia	NSL Cup: Toronto Croatia; NSL Canadian Championship: Toronto Italia; NSL Canada Cup: Toronto Croatia
1990		no play-off		Toronto First Portuguese	Toronto Italia	NSL Cup: St. Catharines Roma; NSL Canadian Championship: Toronto First Portuguese
1991		no play-off		Toronto Italia	Scarbourough International	NSL Cup: Toronto Argentina; NSL Canada Cup: Toronto Argentina
1992		no play-off		Toronto Croatia	St. Catharines Roma	NSL Cup: Toronto Croatia
1993	St. Catharines Roma	0–0 / 1–0	Toronto Rockets	Toronto Rockets	Croatia de Montréal	CNSL Cup: Toronto Croatia
1994	Toronto Italia	0–1 / 3–1	St. Catharines Roma	Toronto Italia	St. Catharines Roma	CNSL Cup: St. Catharines Roma
1995	St. Catharines Wolves	1–1 / 2–1	Toronto Jets	Toronto Jets	St. Catharines Wolves	CNSL Cup: St. Catharines Wolves
1996	Toronto Italia	5–0 / 6–0	St. Catharines Wolves	Toronto Italia	St. Catharines Wolves	CNSL Cup: St. Catharines Wolves
1997	St. Catharines Wolves	0–0 / 4–3	Toronto Supra	St. Catharines Wolves	Toronto Croatia	CNSL Cup: Toronto Supra

thecnsl.com – Canadian National Soccer League / Update: 6 June 2022
RSSSF – Canadian National Soccer League / Update: 6 June 2022

=== Titles ===
Team	Playoff championships		Regular season championships		Total championships
Team	Titles	Years	Titles	Years	Total championships
Toronto Italia (1972–96)	8	1972, 1983, 1984, 1985, 1986, 1987, 1994, 1996	9	1975, 1976, 1982, 1984, 1988, 1989, 1991, 1994, 1996	17
Toronto Ulster United FC	8	1926, 1932, 1933, 1934, 1941, 1952, 1954, 1955	7	1926, 1929w, 1932w, 1934w, 1935w, 1938w, 1939w	15
Montréal Carsteel FC	3	1936, 1940, 1948	11	1931e, 1932e, 1933e, 1934e, 1936e, 1938e, 1939e, 1940e, 1941e, 1948e, 1949e	14
Toronto Ukrainia	5	1951, 1953, 1961, 1963, 1964	5	1953, 1954, 1955, 1964, 1965	10
Toronto Croatia	3	1971, 1974, 1988	5	1970, 1971, 1972, 1973, 1992	8
Toronto Italia FC (1953–68)	3	1957, 1959, 1960	2	1957, 1960	5
Toronto Scottish FC	2	1930, 1931	3	1930w, 1931w, 1933w	5
St. Catharines Roma / St. Catharines Wolves	3	1993, 1995, 1997	1	1997	4
Montréal CNR	2	1928, 1929	2	1929e, 1930e	4
Toronto First Portuguese	1	1976	3	1969, 1979, 1990	4
Hamilton Steelers	2	1981, 1982	1	1981	3
Hamilton Westinghouse (1948–55)	1	1950	2	1948w, 1950w	3
Toronto East End Canadians	1	1949	2	1949w, 1952	3
Sudbury Italia	1	1968	2	1966, 1968	3
Montréal Royal Victoria Hospital	2	1938, 1939	0		2
Windsor Teutonia	2	1966, 1967	0		2
Frood Mines	1	1935	1	1935n	2
Toronto British Consols	1	1937	1	1937w	2
Polish White Eagles	1	1956	1	1956	2
Montréal Hungaria	1	1958	1	1958	2
Italian Virtus	1	1962	1	1963	2
Toronto Falcons	1	1978	1	1980	2
Toronto Panhellenic	1	1980	1	1983	2
Hamilton Thistles	0		2	1928w, 1936w	2
Falconbridge FC	0		2	1936n, 1937n	2
Toronto Maple Leafs	0		2	1940w, 1941w	2
Montréal Castors	0		2	1977, 1978	2
Toronto Greenbacks	1	1947	0		1
Toronto Hakoah	1	1965	0		1
Hamilton Croatia	1	1970	0		1
Toronto Hungaria	1	1973	0		1
National Breweries	0		1	1928e	1
Montréal Aldred	0		1	1935e	1
CNR Scottish	0		1	1937e	1
Montréal Stelco	0		1	1947	1
Montréal Canadian Falcons	0		1	1950e	1
Toronto St. Andrews	0		1	1951	1
Montréal Cantalia FC	0		1	1959	1
Toronto Roma FC	0		1	1961	1
Olympia-Harmonie	0		1	1962	1
Hamilton Primos	0		1	1967	1
Serbian White Eagles	0		1	1974	1
London Marconi	0		1	1985	1
Toronto Blizzard	0		1	1986	1
Windsor Wheels	0		1	1987	1
Toronto Rockets	0		1	1993	1
Toronto Jets	0		1	1995	1

== NSL/CNSL clubs ==
Clubs are listed by name and year that a club by that name participated. Whether clubs by the same name were indeed the same club or not has not been made clear by the source used for compiling this list. Note as well that the same source does not include information for the Eastern Division of the league from the 1930s through to the 1950s, nor any information at all for the following seasons: 1968, 1969, from 1983 through 1992, and 1994. Moreover, the source provides only an incomplete list of teams for 1947 through 1949, and, for a few other seasons, not all team names in full.

- America United (1988?-1990)
- Bradford Marshlanders (1977–1982 – ?)
- Brampton Kicks (? – 1993, ?1994)
- Brantford City (1931–1934)
- Brantford Cockshutts (1928–1930; 1948)
- Buffalo Blazers (1976–1978, 1980)
- Canadian National Railway (1929–1932)
- Corinthians (1928, 1929)
- Detroit Besa (1981)
- Dynamo Latino (?–1985)
- Fergus (1948)
- General Motors (1928)
- Guelph Taylor-Forbes (1928)
- Hamilton Apollos (?1968, ?1969, 1970–1972)
- Hamilton Austins (1951)
- Hamilton British Imperials (1948)
- Hamilton City (1927–1940; 1950; 1973–1975)
- Hamilton Cougars (1959)
- Hamilton Croatia (?1968, ?1969, 1970–1976)
- Hamilton Homer (?1968, ?1969, 1970; 1973–1975)
- Hamilton Hungaria (1958)
- Hamilton Italo-Canadians (1958–1960; 1972–1979)
- Hamilton Primos (1967, ?1968, ?1969)
- Hamilton Steelers (1981, 1982)
- Hamilton Stelcos (1939, 1940; 1947)
- Hamilton Thistles (1927–1938)
- Hamilton Westinghouse (1948–1955)
- Hamilton White Eagles (1993, 1995)
- Kenwoods (1941)
- Kitchener Concordia (?1968, ?1969, 1970, ?1971)
- Kitchener Kickers (1965, 1966, ?1967, ?1968, ?1969)
- Kitchener Maple Leafs (?1971, 1972)
- Kosova Albanians (1997)
- Liptons (1941)
- London City (1973–1997)
- London Marconi (1984–1989)
- London CNR (1928)
- London German Canadians (?1968, ?1969, 1970–1972)
- McKinnons (1929)
- Montreal Alouettes (1959)
- Montreal Cantalia (1958–1960; 1964)
- Montreal Carsteel (1927–1948 –?)
- Montreal Castors (1975–1978)
- Montreal CNR (1928–?)
- Montreal Concordia (1960, 1961)
- Montreal Hungaria (1959, 1960)
- Montreal Maroons (1927)
- Montreal Sparta (1958)
- Montreal Stars (1979)
- Montreal Ukrainians (1959, 1960; 1964)
- North York Rockets (1993)
- North York Talons (1996, 1997)
- Oakville CW (1996)
- Oshawa Italia (1962)
- Ottawa Sons of Italy (?1968, ?1969, 1970, ?1971)
- Ottawa Tigers (?1971, 1972–1978)
- Quebec Selects (1974)
- Queen City (1962)
- Richmond Hill Kick (?–1993, ?1994)
- Scarborough Astros (1994?, 1995, 1996)
- Serbian White Eagles (1970–1980)
- Soccer Portugais du Quebec (1970)
- St. Andrews/Earlscourt (1955)
- St. Catharines Heidelberg (1971–1978)
- St. Catharines (Roma) Wolves (1978–1997) – (St. Catharines Roma 1978–1994; St. Catharines Wolves 1995; St. Catharines Roma Wolves 1996, 1997)
- Sudbury (1971)
- Sudbury Cyclones (1976–1980)
- Sudbury Italia (1965–1967)
- Toronto Abruzzi (1964, 1965)
- Toronto Azurri (1965)
- Toronto Blizzard (1986)
- Toronto British Consols (1934–1939)
- Toronto Canadian Scots (1957, 1958)
- Toronto Canadians (1979)
- Toronto City (1948)
- Toronto CNR (1928)
- Toronto Congasco (1933)
- Toronto Croatia (1963–1982 –?–1993; 1997)
- Toronto Dinamo (1982–?)
- Toronto East End Canadians (1949–1956)
- Toronto England United (1935–1941)
- Toronto Estonia (1962, 1963)
- Toronto Falcons (1976–1982 –?)
- Toronto First Portuguese (1965–1981)
- Toronto Greenbacks (1947)
- Toronto Hakoah (1954; 1964, 1965)
- Toronto Hellas (1965–1967, ?1968, ?1969, 1970)
- Toronto Hungaria (1952–1975)
- Toronto Inter-Roma (1967, ?1968, ?1969)
- Toronto Italia (1953–1960)
- Toronto Italian Virtus (1962, 1963)
- Toronto Jets (1995)
- Toronto Macedonia (1974–1977)
- Toronto Macedonians (1962)
- Toronto Malta United (1957, 1958)
- Toronto Maple Leafs (1928–1941)
- Toronto Maroons (1934)
- Toronto Melita (1973–1975)
- Toronto Mississauga Hungaria (1977, 1978)
- Toronto Oakwoods (1950)
- Toronto Olympia (1952–1965)
- Toronto Panhellenic (1976–1982 –?)
- Toronto Polish White Eagles (1952–1961)
- Toronto Polonia (1964; 1973)
- Toronto Scottish (1927–1941; 1950–1952)
- Toronto Serbians (1979)
- Toronto Sparta (1956–1960)
- Toronto Supra (1996, 1997)
- Toronto St. Andrews (1950)
- Toronto Transit Commission (1928–1934)
- Toronto Tridents (1954–1960)
- Toronto Ukrainia (1977–1981)
- Toronto Ukrainians (1950–1967, ?1968, ?1969)
- Toronto Ulster United (1927–1941; 1947–1961)
- Toronto White Eagles (1967, ?1968, ?1969)
- Le Tricolore de Montréal (1955?)
- Welland (1948)
- Willy Overland (1928)
- Windsor Rovers (1927)
- Windsor Stars (1975–1978)
- Windsor Teutonia (?1965, 1966, 1967–?1968, ?1969)
- Windsor Wheels (?–1993, ?1994)
- Winnipeg Fury (1993)
- Woodbridge (?–1993, ?1994)

== See also ==
- Canadian Soccer League (1987–1992)
