= Eastern Canada Professional Soccer League =

- Founded: 1961
- Country: Canada
- Confederation: NAFC
- Number of clubs: High of 6, Low of 4

The Eastern Canada Professional Soccer League was a soccer league in Canada. The league operated for six seasons from 1961 to 1966 across four cities in two Canadian provinces and one American state. In the 1960s, the Eastern Canada Professional Soccer League was one of four major leagues in Canadian soccer alongside the Pacific Coast League, the Western Canada Soccer League, and the National Soccer League of Ontario/Quebec.

The league was founded in 1961 by George Gross and Peter Bosa. According to Gross, the genesis for the league was formed from a conversation the two men had during the Christmas 1960 holidays. Bosa promised the inclusion of his club Toronto Italia (champions of the National Soccer League) and arranged for the inclusion of the Hamilton Steelers (backed by John Agro and Arnold Martini); Gross helped form Toronto City FC (with Ed Fitkin, Steve Stavro and Laddie Myslivec) and arranged for the inclusion of Montréal Cantalia FC (run by Dr. Ernest Stastny).

The league was officially launched on 30 March 1961 at a press conference in Toronto with Sarto Marchand the league's first president and William Simpson as the league's secretary. Harold Ballard, initially the league's executive vice-president, succeeded Marchand as league president and held the position until March 1964. Simpson thereafter served as league president (1964) and then Chairman (1965 and 1966). After six seasons, the Eastern Canada Professional Soccer League amalgamated with the National Soccer League on 20 December 1966.

The league typically operated from May to September, which initially allowed Canadian clubs to sign European-based players for the summer season. In the first year, stars like Danny Blanchflower, Stanley Matthews and Johnny Haynes all joined the new league for part of the 1961 summer season, then returned to England for the 1961-62 Football League season. The practice proved unpopular with European clubs, prompting British clubs to ban their players from traveling to Canada to join the rival league. On 19 April 1962, FIFA ruled that players could not switch clubs without a proper transfer.

== Champions ==
In each season, there was both a regular-season champion and playoff champion. The regular-season champions managed to win the playoff championship only twice in six years (1963 and 1964).

=== Champions ===
Year	President's Cup Playoff Champions	Playoff Runners-up	Regular season league winners
1961	Montréal Cantalia FC	Toronto Italia FC	Toronto City SC
1962	Toronto Italia FC	Toronto City FC	Toronto Roma FC
1963	Toronto Italia FC	Montréal Cantalia FC	Toronto Italia FC
1964	Toronto City FC	Toronto Italia FC	Toronto City FC
1965	Toronto Italia Falcons	Primo Hamilton FC	Montréal Italica
1966	Toronto Inter Roma	Toronto Italia FC	Toronto Italia FC

=== Titles ===
Team	Playoff championships		Regular season championships		Total championships
Team	Titles	Years	Titles	Years	Total championships
Toronto Italia FC / Italia Falcons	3	1962, 1963, 1965	2	1963, 1966	5
Toronto City FC	1	1964	2	1961, 1964	3
Toronto Roma FC / Inter-Roma	1	1966	1	1962	2
Montréal Cantalia FC	1	1961	0		1
Montréal Italica	0		1	1965	1

== 1961 season ==
The 1961 season featured a 48-match schedule from 14 May to 20 September, with all four teams playing 24 matches each. Matches were played at Varsity Stadium in Toronto, Civic Centre in Hamilton, and Stade Delorimier in Montréal. Hamilton Steelers won the league's opening match 2–1, although it was Montréal Cantalia's Ismael Ferreyra who scored the league's first goal in the 14 May opener. An all-star match was played on 4 September featuring stars from Toronto's two teams against stars from Hamilton-Montréal. The regular season was then followed by two rounds of playoffs from 21 September to 9 October.

== 1962 season ==
The 1962 season featured a 60-match schedule from 5 May to 9 August, with five teams playing 24 matches each. Montréal Cantalia, the 1961 playoff champions, withdrew from the league, as did proposed entries Ukraina and Hungária SC from the same city. Toronto Roma FC and Buffalo White Eagles were both added. With Buffalo in the league, this was the first and only season in which matches were played outside of Canada. The regular season was followed by two rounds of playoffs from 12 to 18 August (one match per series).

== 1963 season ==
The 1963 season featured a 74-match schedule from 5 May to 1 September, with six teams playing up to 25 matches each. Montréal Cantalia rejoined the league, Ukraina Montréal were added, while Buffalo dropped out. The regular season was followed by two rounds of playoffs from 4 to 18 September.

== 1964 season ==
The 1964 season featured a 60-match schedule from 3 May to 26 August, with five teams playing up to 24 matches each. Ukraina Montréal dropped out while Cantalia were replaced by Montréal Italica. A league all-star team played touring Heart of Midlothian F.C. on 5 June in Toronto. The regular season was followed by two rounds of playoffs from 29 August to 13 September.

== 1965 season ==
The 1965 season featured a 60-match schedule from 5 May to 5 September, with five teams playing 24 matches each. In the second half of the season, Wednesday night matches at Varsity Stadium were broadcast live through a television deal with O'Keefe beer. The regular season was followed by two rounds of playoffs from 8 to 22 September.

== 1966 season ==
The 1966 season featured a 48-match schedule from 8 May to 28 August, with four teams playing 24 matches each. Toronto City, one of the league's original teams, withdrew from the league in January. The regular season was followed by two rounds of playoffs from 31 August to 7 September (one match per series).

== Teams from 1961 to 1966 ==
- Buffalo White Eagles (1962)
- Hamilton Steelers (1961–1964) / Primo Hamilton FC (1965–1966)
- Montréal Cantalia FC (1961, 1963)
- Montréal Italica (1964–1965) / Inter Italica (1966)
- Ukraina Montréal (1963)
- Toronto City FC (1961–1965)
- Toronto Roma FC (1962-1964 / Inter-Roma (1965–1966)
- Toronto Italia FC (1961–1964) / Italia Falcons (1965–66)
