= Hakoah Stanisławów =

Defunct Jewish football club (1908 to 1939)

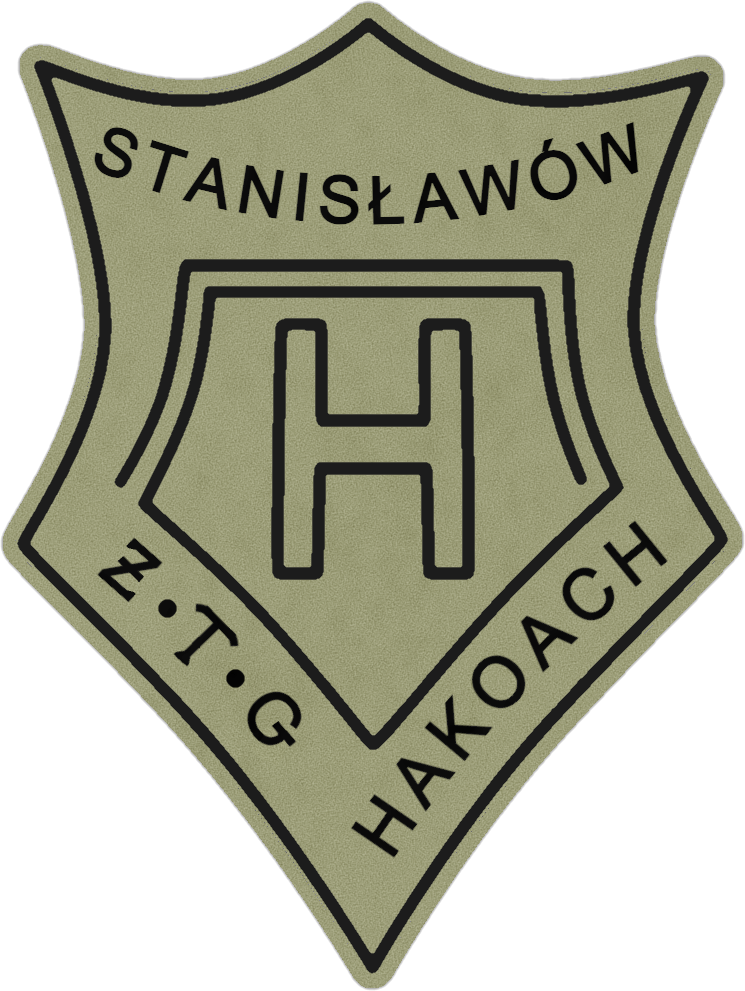
- Full name: מועדון ספורט יהודי הכח סטאַניסלעװ (Jewish Sports Club Hakoah Stanisławów)
- Founded: 1908
- Dissolved: 1939
- Ground: Municipal Savings Bank Stadium
- League: Stanisławów District League (Class B)
- 1938: 4th
Home colours

Hakoah Stanisławów (Note: Alternatively spelled Hakoach Stanisławów) (officially: Żydowski Klub Sportowy Hakoah Stanisławów) was a Jewish sports club based in Stanisławów (present-day Ivano-Frankivsk, Ukraine), active between the years 1908–1939. It was among the first sports organizations founded in Stanisławów. During the interbellum, it competed in the lower tiers of the Polish district league—initially under the Lwów OZPN, and from 1934 onward, under the Stanisławów OZPN.

== History ==
=== Establishment and early history ===
Founded in 1908, the Hakoah Stanisławów sports club emerged within the framework of the Jewish Gymnastic Society "Hakoah" in Stanisławów, cultivating, among other disciplines, football. Alongside the Polish club Rewera Stanisławów, it was one of the first football teams founded in the city, reflecting the broader trend at the time of establishing clubs primarily along national lines.

Schatzberger served as the club's first captain; its key members included Juljusz Kirschenblatt, Maks Wortmann, G. Reich, S. Arnold, and I. Falk. Initially, the club held its training sessions in Dąbrowa. As a result of both world wars, much of the archival material pertaining to the club's first two years of operation has been lost. Until 1911, Hakoah Stanisławów likely received grants from the municipal government to support its development in addition to being granted use of the Municipal Savings Bank Stadium. After the stadium was transferred to Sokół Stanisławów, the club acquired its own grounds by renting a plot of land on Matejko Street in Stanisławów, beside an orphanage, with the Kirschenblatt family's apartment serving as the team's changing room.

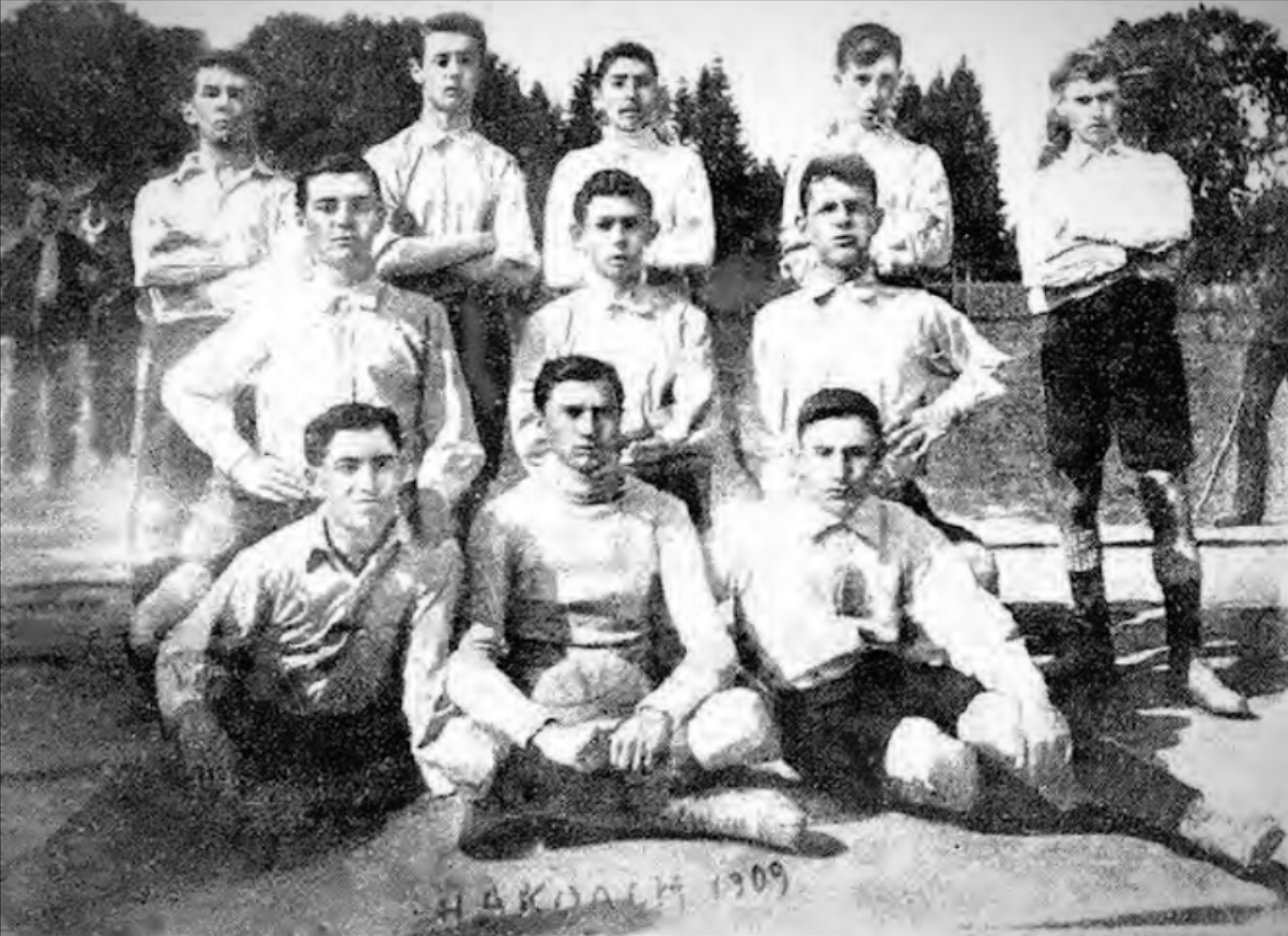
The first team of Hakoah Stanisławów in 1909

The club's first matches were held against local teams, but as its organization and finances strengthened over time, it began participating in annual competitions with neighbouring Jewish clubs based in Lwów and Czernowitz. These games served to commemorate Theodor Herzl—Austrian statesman and founder of the World Zionist Organization. In mid-July 1911, Hakoah Stanisławów recorded a 3:2 win in a home match against a Czernowitz-based team, as recorded in Bukovinian press. In October of that year, the club played and defeated the Lwów-based Hasmonea Lwów 1:0. Later that month, on October 15, the team travelled to Czernowitz, where they suffered a 1:4 defeat to the local side—Hakoah Czernowitz.

=== Within the Polish league ===
By the early 1920s, Hakoah Stanisławów was among a handful clubs in Poland's Stanisławów Voivodeship with an established football section. In 1919, concurrent with the founding of the Polish Football Association (PZPN), the Lwów District League was established—encompassing much of southeastern Poland, including the Stanisławów Voivodeship. Hakoah Stanisławów entered league competition in 1921, making its debut in the Stanisławów–Stryj subdistrict of the Lwów OZPN's Class C. That season, the club faced just two other teams: Hakoah Stryj and Pogoń Stryj, and managed to secure promotion into Class B.

Hakoah Stanisławów continued its strong performance in the following season, in 1922, once again topping its subdistrict. However, the club failed to qualify for Lwów OZPN's Class A, scoring last place among four other clubs in the Class B finals, notably losing to Czarni Lwów 0:3 and 0:4. During this season, Hakoah's reserve team competed in the district league's Class C. Hakoah Stanisławów continued competing in the district league's Class B between 1922 and 1928. During this period, the club appears to still have played at Municipal Savings Bank Stadium. In 1922, Hakoah Stanisławów hosted Austrian silver medalists Hakoah Vienna during their tour of Poland, ending the match with a 0:13 defeat. The following year, the Viennese club returned to Stanisławów, securing another victory, this time 10:0.

In 1928 and 1930, Hakoah Stanisławów emerged as the leading football team in the Stanisławów Subdistrict; in the 1928 season, the club secured promotion to the Lwów OZPN's Class A. The club's time in the Lwów District League's top tier was brief; placed in Group II of Class A, they finished fifth in a six-team group, resulting in relegation. Although the club again led the Stanisławów Subdistrict in the 1930 season, it did not manage to return to Class A, finishing third among four teams in the Class B finals. In 1931, Hakoah Stanisławów once again met Hakoah Vienna in a friendly match, this time conceding 2:6.

In 1933, the Stanisławów District League was established, although the first district league playoffs were not held until the following year. From 1934 onward, Hakoah Stanisławów competed within the framework of the Stanisławów OZPN. In 1935, Hakoah Stanisławów played friendly matches against the Cernăuți-based clubs Hakoah and Dragoș Vodă.

=== Disestablishment ===
In September 1939, the Second World War broke out; the Soviet invasion derailed the ambitions of many Kresovian clubs. As a result, Hakoah Stanisławów was dissolved. Throughout its history, the club competed in Class C (1921) and Class B (1922–1928; 1930–1933) of the Lwów District League, and in Class B (1934–1939) of the Stanisławów District League. It made a single appearance in Lwów's top tier, Class A, in 1929, scoring 5 points with a total goal difference of –7 (12 goals scored, 19 conceded). Overall, the club failed to record any significant achievements.

== Season standings ==
Season	League Playoffs			Notes
Season	League		Place	Notes
1921	IV	Class C Lwów OZPN (Stanisławów–Stryj Subdistrict)	▲1/3	Club enters league playoffs; Promotion to Class B
1922	III	Class B Lwów OZPN (Tarnopol–Stanisławów Subdistrict)	1/3	4/4 place in Class B finals; Promotion to Class A not secured
1923	III	Class B Lwów OZPN (Tarnopol–Stanisławów Subdistrict)	4/4	
1924	III	Class B Lwów OZPN (Tarnopol–Stanisławów Subdistrict)	2/4	
1925	III	Class B Lwów OZPN (Stanisławów Subdistrict)	4/5	
1926	III	Class B Lwów OZPN (Stanisławów Subdistrict)	3/5	
1927	III	Class B Lwów OZPN (Stanisławów Subdistrict)	4/5	
1928	III	Class B Lwów OZPN (Stanisławów Subdistrict)	▲1/5	Promotion to Class A
1929	II	Class A Lwów OZPN (Group II)	▼5/6	Relegation to Class B
1930	III	Class B Lwów OZPN (Stanisławów Subdistrict)	1/9	3/4 place in Class B finals; Promotion to Class A not secured
1931	III	Class B Lwów OZPN (Stanisławów Subdistrict)	4/7	
1932	–	N/A		Club does not appear in records of upper league playoffs
1933	III	Class B Lwów OZPN (Stanisławów Subdistrict)	4/8	
1934	III	Class B Stanisławów OZPN	5/8	Commencement of the Stanisławów District League
1935	III	Class B Stanisławów OZPN	3/6	
1936	III	Class B Stanisławów OZPN	N/A	
1936/1937	III	Class B Stanisławów OZPN	4/7	
1937/1938	III	Class B Stanisławów OZPN	2/8	
1938/1939	III	Class B Stanisławów OZPN (Group I)	4/6	
1939/1940	III	Class B Stanisławów OZPN	–	Playoffs could not take place due to the outbreak of World War II
