= 1920 Polish Football Championship =

1st season of top-tier football league in Poland

Polish Football Championship
- Season: 1920
- Dates: 29 August 1920 – 31 October 1920

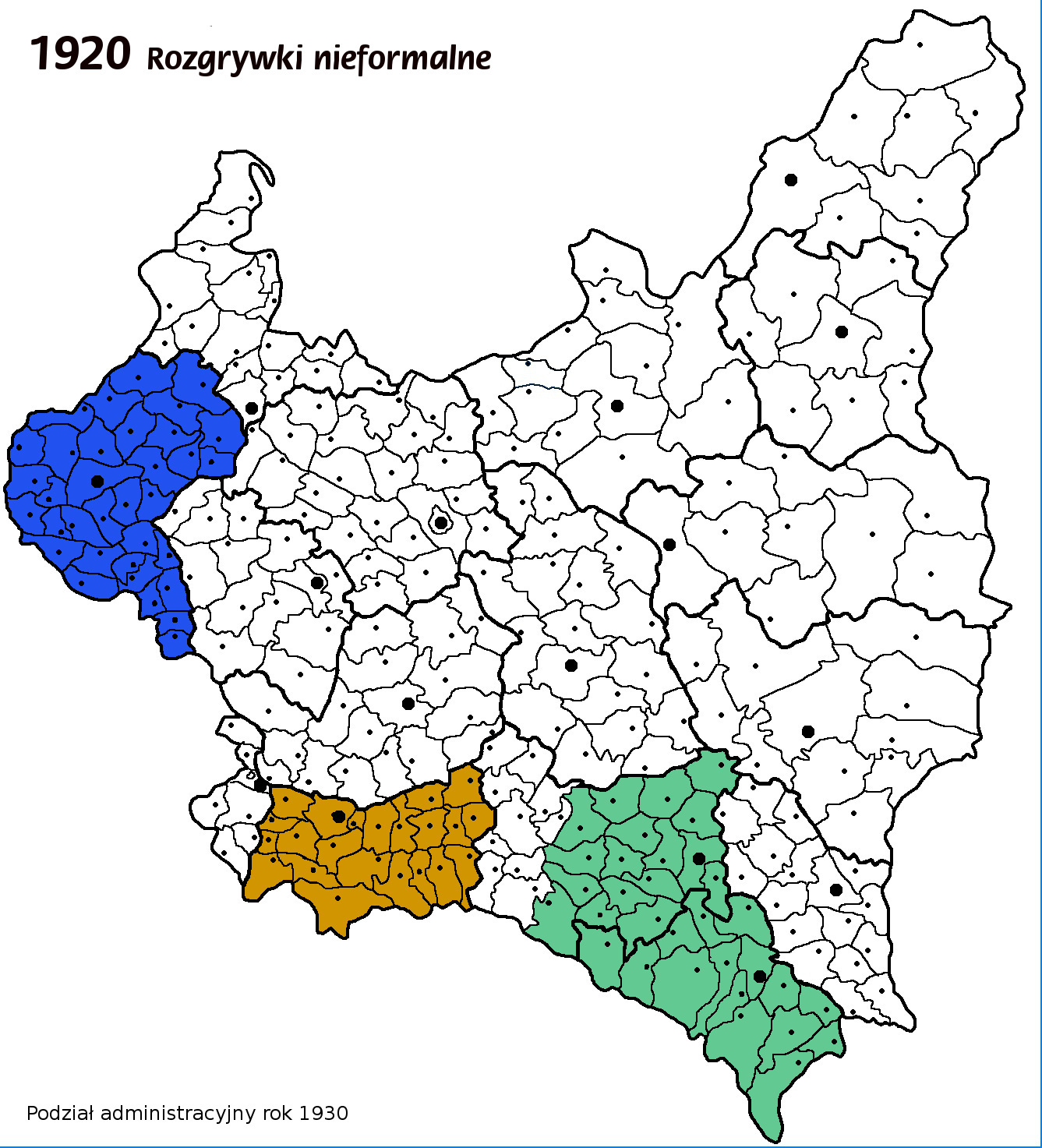
Three regional A-Classes in which the games actually started.

1920 Polish Football Championship was the 1st edition of the Polish Football Championship (Non-League). It was abandoned due to the Polish–Soviet War. Winners of five regional groups were to meet in the final tournament.

== Regional A-Classes tournaments ==
=== Cracovian Group ===
==== Final table ====
Pos	Team	Pld	W	D	L	GF	GA	GD	Pts
1	Cracovia	6	5	0	1	28	2	+26	20
2	Wisła Kraków	6	3	1	2	13	5	+8	14
3	Makkabi Kraków	6	2	2	2	5	8	−3	12
4	Jutrzenka Kraków	6	0	1	5	1	32	−31	2

Source: rsssf.com

=== Lvovian Group ===
Only two matches played: Pogoń Lwów vs. Czarni Lwów 3–1 and Czarni Lwów vs. Polonia Przemyśl 6–0. Rewera Stanisławów played no match. Games not finished.

Pos	Team	Pld	W	D	L	GF	GA	GD	Pts
1	Czarni Lwów	2	1	0	1	7	3	+4	2
2	Pogoń Lwów	1	1	0	0	3	1	+2	2
3	Polonia Przemyśl	1	0	0	1	0	6	−6	0
4	Rewera Stanisławów	0	0	0	0	0	0	0	0

Source: rsssf.com

=== Lodzian Group ===
No matches played. Teams entered: ŁKS, Klub Turystów, ŁTSG and (ŁTG) Szturm, all from Łódź.

=== Posnanian Group ===
Games not finished.

Pos	Team	Pld	W	D	L	GF	GA	GD	Pts
1	Warta Poznań	6	–	–	–	30	4	+26	10
2	Unia Poznań	7	–	–	–	10	17	−7	9
3	Posnania Poznań	7	–	–	–	13	8	+5	8
4	Pogoń Poznań	6	–	–	–	13	22	−9	3
5	Ostrovia Ostrów Wlkp.	6	–	–	–	0	15	−15	2

Source: rsssf.com

=== Varsovian Group ===
No matches played. Teams entered: Polonia Warsaw and Korona Warsaw.

== Final tournament table ==
Games not started.

Pos	Team	Pld	W	D	L	GF	GA	GD	Pts
–	Cracovia	0	–	–	–	0	0	0	0
–	–	0	–	–	–	0	0	0	0
–	–	0	–	–	–	0	0	0	0
–	–	0	–	–	–	0	0	0	0
–	–	0	–	–	–	0	0	0	0

Source: rsssf.com
