= Lwów District League =

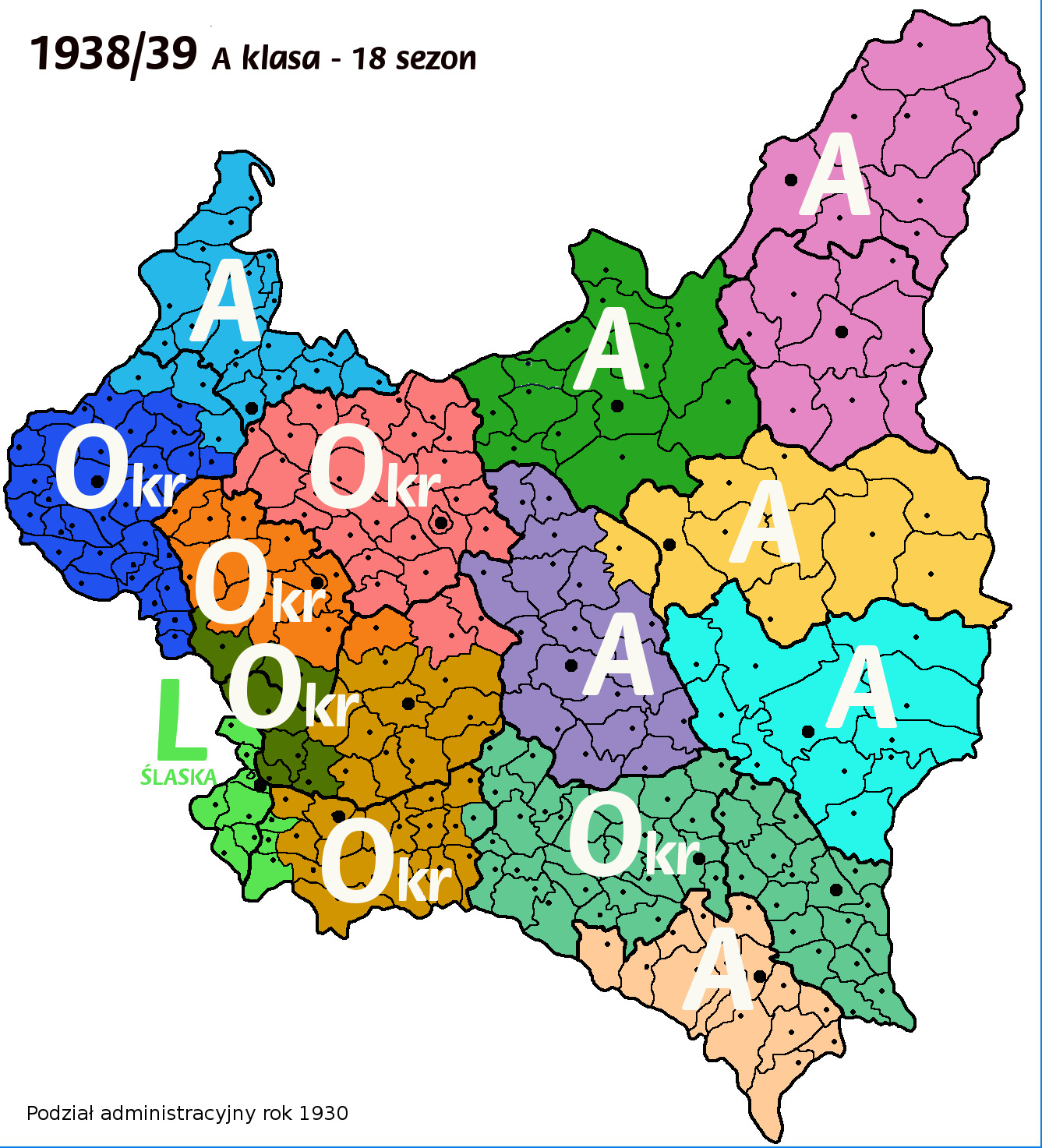
On the map identified in a light green at the lower right corner

Lwów district football competitions (Polish: Lwówskie okręgowe rozgrywki w piłce nożnej) were a regional association football competitions on territory of Lwów Voivodeship, Tarnopol Voivodeship, and Stanisławów Voivodeship (1920-1934), Poland (then Second Polish Republic) in 1920–1939. The competitions were organized by the Lwówskie Okręgowych Związków Piłki Nożnej, Lwówskie OZPN.

The league was created in 1920, as the original four district leagues of the Polish Football Union and is considered a continuation of the Austrian Football Championship of Galicia in 1913–1914.

The competitions were conducted on territory of modern West Ukraine which during the World War II was annexed by the Soviet Union and added to the Soviet Ukraine (Ukrainian Soviet Socialist Republic). The Lwów District League is considered to be a football precursor of the Lviv Oblast Football Federation championship in the modern Ukraine and the Subcarpathia Regional Division of the Polish Fifth League.

Winners of the league qualified to all-Polish championship among winners of all district leagues in Poland. In 1927, number of better Polish clubs organized all-Polish National League which was a predecessor of the today's Ekstraklasa. At the same time winners of the district league since then qualified to regional play-offs, a winner of which was advancing to the newly formed National League.

In 1928 and 1929, the Lwów District League temporarily administered the regional football competitions in Wołyń Voivodeship as Wołyń subgroup, which in 1930 officially formed the Wołyń District League.

== Champions ==
List of the top tier's winners of the district league

Season	Champions	Runners-up	Third place	# teams	Notes
1920	Czarni Lwów	Pogoń Lwów	Polonia Przemyśl	4	not finished
1921	Pogoń Lwów	Czarni Lwów		2	only two teams
1922	Pogoń Lwów	Czarni Lwów	Lechia Lwów	5	
1923	Pogoń Lwów	Czarni Lwów	Polonia Przemyśl	6	
1924	Pogoń Lwów	Czarni Lwów	Hasmonea Lwów	6	relegation/promotion
1925	no competitions				
1926	Pogoń Lwów	Czarni Lwów	Hasmonea Lwów	6	relegation/promotion
1927	6th Aviation Regiment	Lechia Lwów	Janina Złoczów	5	conflict with Przemyśl clubs
1928	Polonia Przemyśl	Rewera Stanisławów	AZS Lwów/Pogoń Stryj	10	relegation/promotion, two groups
1929	Lechia Lwów	Polonia Przemyśl	Janina Złoczów/Pogoń Stryj	10	relegation/promotion, two groups
1930	Lechia Lwów	Polonia Przemyśl	Ukraina Lwów	9	relegation/promotion
1931	Rewera Stanisławów	Pogoń Stryj	Polonia Przemyśl	8	
1932	Polonia Przemyśl	Rewera Stanisławów	Drugi Sokół Lwów	13	relegation/promotion, two groups, two stages
1933	Polonia Przemyśl	Lechia Lwów	Resovia Rzeszów	13	relegation/promotion, two groups, two stages
1934	Czarni Lwów	Resovia Rzeszów	Polonia Przemyśl	10	relegation/promotion (renamed)
1935	Czarni Lwów	Pogoń Stryj	Hasmonea Lwów	11	relegation/promotion
1936 (sp)	Polonia Przemyśl	Czuwaj Przemyśl	Czarni Lwów/Lechia Lwów	10	two groups
1936–37	Resovia	Ukraina Lwów	Ognisko Jarosław	12	
1937–38	Czarni Lwów	Ukraina Lwów	Polonia Przemyśl	14	relegation/promotion
1938–39	Junak Drohobycz	Ukraina Lwów	Czarni Lwów	13	relegation/promotion
1939–40	Ukraina Lwów	Hasmonea Lwów	Czarni Lwów	11	not finished (only 2 rounds played)

== Winners ==
- 5 – Pogoń Lwów
- 4 – Polonia Przemyśl
- 3 – Czarni Lwów
- 2 – Lechia Lwów
- 1 – 4 clubs 6th Aviation Regiment, Rewera Stanisławów, Resovia, Junak Drohobycz

== Wołyń subgroup ==
Separate football competitions were established in 1928 in Wołyń Voivodeship under administration of the Lwów District Football Union (OZPN) as a separate subgroup out teams that previously competed in the Lublin District League. Winners of the newly established competitions were not allowed to the promotional play-offs.

Season	Champions	Runners-up	Third place	# teams	Notes
1928	Hallerczyki Równe	Sokół Równe	WKS Kowel	4	
1929	WKS Kowel	Hasmonea Równe	Hallerczyki Równe	5	

== See also ==
- Lviv Oblast Football Federation
