= 1932 unrest in Lviv =

1932 Polish riot

- Location: 49°50′31.20″N 24°01′55.19″E; Lviv, Second Polish Republic
- Date: November–December 1932
- Attack type: riots

The 1932 unrest in Lviv refers to antisemitic disturbances that took place in Lviv in November and December 1932.

From the late 1920s, the All-Polish Youth and other nationalist organizations vigorously campaigned for the introduction of ghetto benches and official restrictions on the number of Jewish students. Their actions were often accompanied by acts of violence. In the fall of 1932, the National Democratic Youth provoked two large-scale riots in Lviv (12–13 November and 27 November–1 December). In the first case, the pretext was the anniversary of the death of a Polish student who was killed in a clash with Jewish students in Vilnius; in the second, it was the death of a Lviv student who was killed by Jewish hooligans in a drunken brawl. The riots resulted in numerous injuries and arrests, as well as significant property damage.

== Background ==
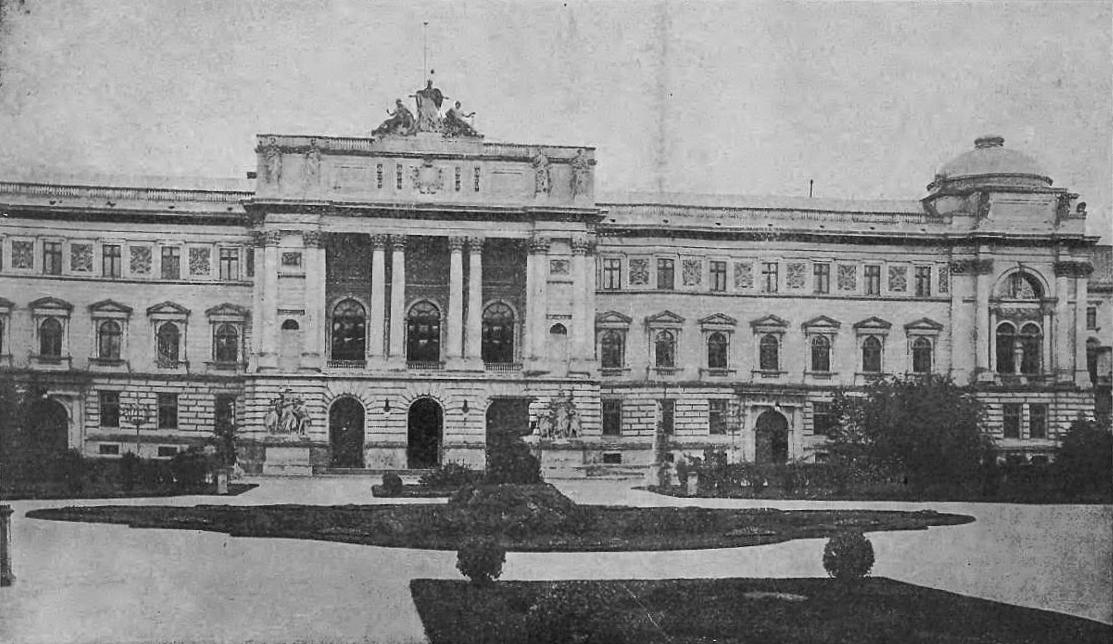
Main building of John Casimir University

In the interwar period, the Polish student community in Lviv was strongly influenced by the nationalist organizations. This was especially evident at the John Casimir University, where, at the turn of the 1920s and 1930s, the position of the All-Polish Youth remained, in the words of Grzegorz Mazur, "incredibly strong".

In June 1929, female students of a private Jewish secondary school in Lviv were unjustly accused of deliberately disrupting the Corpus Christi procession. Under the pretext of defending religious feelings, nationalist groups sparked antisemitic riots in the city. The decisive reaction of the Sanation authorities meant that the unrest also took on an anti-government character. These events, dubbed the "klocjada" after the name of the city administrator, Aleksander Klotz, reverberated throughout Poland.

Since the "klocjada" incident, the process of radicalization among National Democratic youth had been progressing. At universities, including those in Lviv, the All-Polish Youth and related organizations regularly initiated antisemitic actions. First, they demanded the introduction of the numerus clausus principle, and later the numerus nullus. Jews were subjected to economic and social boycotts. From December 1931, the Lviv Academic Committee, dominated by the All-Polish Youth, also demanded the introduction of ghetto benches. Excesses and acts of violence were not uncommon at universities. In May 1932, even the former prime minister and professor at the Lviv Polytechnic, Kazimierz Bartel, was a victim of an assault.

== Riots of 12–13 November ==
10 November 1932 marked the first anniversary of the death of Stanisław Wacławski, a student at Stephen Báthory University in Vilnius, who was killed by a stone during clashes with students of Jewish origin. The nationalist camp decided to use this as a pretext to organize antisemitic demonstrations.

On 11 November, authorities confiscated a stone plaque commemorating Wacławski from L. Tyrowicz's stonemasonry workshop. The National Democratic youth had planned to embed it in the wall of the Second House of Technicians. Leaflets printed at the Academic House were also confiscated. On that day, students appeared on the streets of the city wearing green ribbons, which symbolized the boycott of Jews.

On 12 November, supporters of the nationalist camp began disrupting classes at universities. At John Casimir University, Jewish students were forcibly removed from lecture halls. At 11:00 AM, over a thousand students attended Mass at Saints Peter and Paul Garrison Church. After the service, despite a clear ban by the police, the students marched to the Second House of Technicians, where they hung a makeshift plaque in honor of Wacławski and held a rally. Meanwhile, a group of about 100 people broke away from the crowd and began smashing the windows of Jewish shops in the vicinity of the polytechnic. Several students also vandalized the Louvre Café on the corner of Kościuszko and Trzeciego Maja streets (now Kościuszko and Striltsi Sichovi streets). The students were soon joined by members of the social fringe, who vandalized and looted shops. The police intervened and dispersed the gathering in front of the Second House of Technicians.

In the evening, members of the All-Polish Youth attempted twice to organize a demonstration on Akademicka Street and St. Mary's Square. The police, who had already heavily patrolled the streets of Lviv, dispersed the demonstrators. Nevertheless, in various parts of the city, small groups of nationalists attacked Jewish shops, smashing windows and demolishing shop fronts. 56 shops and businesses were damaged that day, including several belonging to Poles, and several dozen Jews were beaten. The police intervened. Eight students were injured during clashes with officers, and another 33 people were arrested. The riots lasted until 9:30 PM.

On 13 November, the atmosphere in Lviv calmed down somewhat, but this did not mean the end of the riots. On that day, the police dispersed groups of students gathering at various points in the city, including in front of the university building. On Żuliński Street (now Vladimir Filatov dormitory), students fleeing from the police broke the windows of a dairy. Windows were also smashed in shops and businesses in other parts of the city, including a photo studio on Legionów Street (now Svobody Avenue), which had a portrait of Marshal Józef Piłsudski on display. The police detained 23 students.

That day, Voivode Józef Rożniecki received the rectors of the university and the polytechnic, Adam Gerstmann and Kazimierz Zipser. The rectors expressed their regret over the riots, but at the same time intervened to secure the release of the arrested students.

On 14 November, 19 students who had participated in the riots were punished under administrative law. By 19 November, all students arrested during the unrest had been released from custody.

== Riots of 27 November – 1 December ==
=== Death of Jan Grodkowski ===
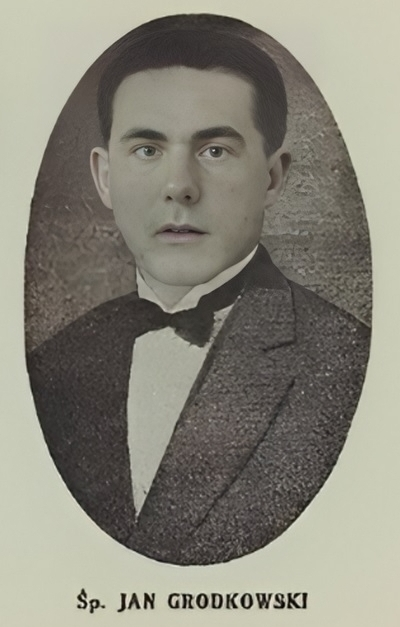
Jan Grodkowski

On the Saturday night of 26–27 November, a group of male students from the Lutyko-Venedya Studentenverbindung were partying at the notorious Adria bar on the corner of Sykstus and Szajnocha streets (now Doroshenko and Bankivska streets). (Note: Some sources claim that Adria was, in fact, a brothel (Mazur (2007, p. 233)). The whole incident was made even more interesting by the fact that it was considered a "Jewish establishment," which is why the students hid their Studentenverbindung insignia before entering (Biedrzycka (2012, p. 638)).) The young men got into a fight with four Jewish batiars: Moshe Katz, Nuchim Schmer, Szulim Keller, and Israel Tune. The situation escalated when Jan Grodkowski, a fourth-year veterinary student, (Note: Some sources give the surname as Grotkowski (Mazur (2007, p. 232)).) hurled insults at Stefania Surówka, a Polish prostitute accompanying the batiars. The dispute soon moved from the bar to the street. At one point, Grodkowski slapped the prostitute, for which Katz stabbed him with a knife. Students Stanisław Pietruszko and Jerzy Szczepanowski were also slightly injured. The police, who arrived at the scene immediately, arrested the knife-wielders and Surówka. Grodkowski died in hospital.

The news of Grodkowski's death spread quickly throughout the city. Leaflets appeared calling for the punishment of "Jews and Sanation men"; according to police findings, at least some of them were prepared by the Communist Party of Western Ukraine hoping to provoke social unrest. The president of Lutyko-Venedya, Tadeusz Winiecki, and the president of the Mutual Aid Society of Students of the Lviv University of Veterinary Medicine, Władysław Borowiak, appealed to students to remain calm. Despite this, riots broke out on the streets of the city on the evening of 27 November. Students attacked Jews and tried to smash Jewish shops. About 50 people were beaten. The escalation was temporarily prevented by the intervention of the police, who suppressed the riots and arrested several people.

=== Escalation of the disturbances ===
The following day brought no calm. In the morning, stones were thrown at the Jewish Academic House on St. Teresa Street (now Metropolitan Andrei Street). Windows of Jewish homes and shops were also smashed. The riots spread to Lviv's universities; Jewish students were attacked at the Lviv Polytechnic and the Academy of Foreign Trade. A dozen or so attackers also broke into the headquarters of the Jewish Mutual Aid Society, where Jewish students were beaten. As a result, the rectors of the university, the polytechnic, and the Academy of Foreign Trade decided to suspend classes.

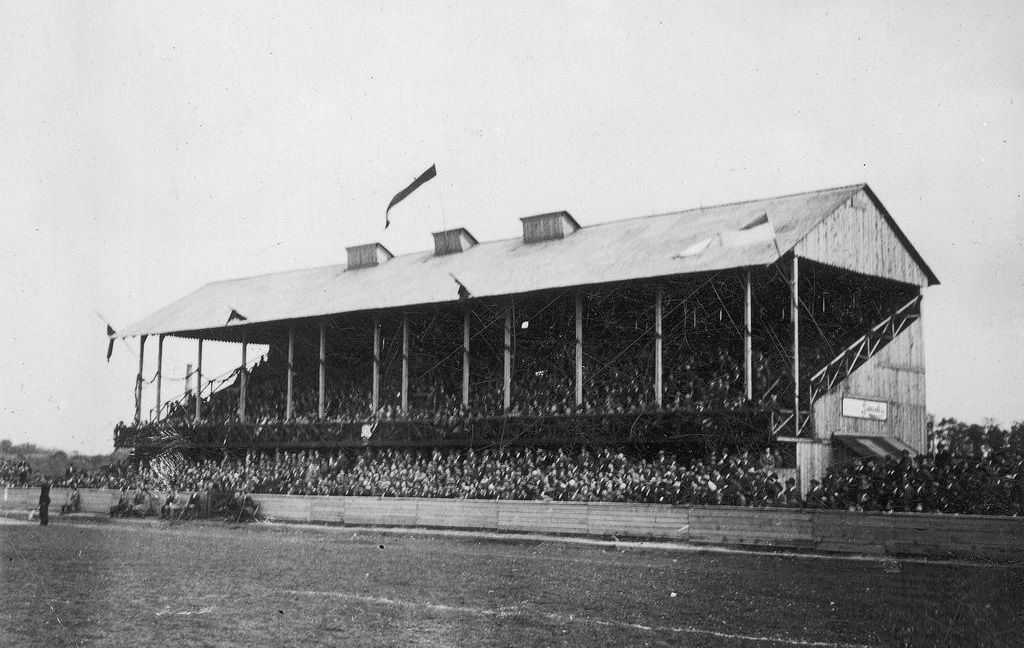
Hasmonea Lviv stadium, which was set on fire during the riots of 28 November 1932

At the request of Mayor Wacław Drojanowski, the Lviv city council issued a proclamation condemning the riots. (Note: Only one councilor, Prof. Marceli Chlamtacz, opposed its adoption and ostentatiously left the room while the proclamation was being read (Piasecki (2015, p. 139)).) Shortly afterwards, a crowd of students went to the tenement where Drojanowski lived and smashed the windows of his apartment. They were joined by representatives of Lviv's marginalized communities, as well as communist agitators who incited them to "loot the rich". On Akademicka Street (now Shevchenko Avenue), a crowd of several thousand people was dispersed by a charge of mounted police. In the afternoon, the police brought in three fire trucks with water tanks and, when they encountered crowds, doused them with streams of water. At least 80 people were injured that day. At around 8:00 PM, the stadium of the Jewish Hasmonea Lwów sports club was set on fire. The riots continued until late at night.

A solemn funeral for Grodkowski took place on 29 November. According to official data, over 15,000 people attended it, (Note: The National Democratic press estimated the number of funeral participants at 40,000 or even 60,000 (Biedrzycka (2012, p. 639)).) including rectors and professors from Lviv universities, local leaders of the nationalist camp, and numerous Catholic clergymen. There was a strong police presence on the streets, with officers attempting to identify and detain potential instigators. After the ceremony, crowds of Lviv residents moved from the Lychakiv Cemetery to the city center, where, despite earlier appeals from scholars and veterans' organizations, riots and attacks on Jews began. During a disturbance on Kopernik Street, student Zygmunt Zamorski was injured. A rumor spread throughout the city that he had been shot by Jews, which led to an escalation of the riots. (Note: Zamorski testified under oath that two Jews, Jonasz Schönfeld and Leon Blaustein, shot him with a revolver. Other witnesses made similar claims. However, a police investigation determined that Zamorski was injured by the premature explosion of a firecracker he was holding. On 15 December, Zamorski was arrested on charges of throwing firecrackers during the riots and giving false testimony (Biedrzycka (2012, pp. 642, 644)).) Jewish shops were attacked, windows in Jewish apartments were smashed, and people of "Semitic appearance" were hunted down in the streets. The latter practice was aided by Lviv tram drivers, who deliberately stopped their vehicles outside stops, allowing attackers to rush inside and beat Jewish passengers. The police were forced to move the tram stop near the polytechnic to prevent gatherings and attacks on Jewish passengers. Gangs also attacked passengers getting off the train at the Łyczaków Station. The police intervened repeatedly, arresting about 80 participants in the riots in the act. In addition, about 40 communists and leftists were detained on charges of inciting the crowd to loot shops and market stalls.

On 30 November, the situation in Lviv remained tense. National Democratic gangs roamed the streets, trying to prevent Jewish shops from reopening. Attacks on Jews continued on the streets and in trams, with gang members mistakenly beating up several Christians as well. Attacks on Jewish passengers also took place on trains to Stanisławów and Tarnopol.

That day, the Lviv bishops of the Latin (Archbishop Bolesław Twardowski and Bishop Franciszek Lisowski) and Armenian (Archbishop Józef Teodorowicz) rites issued a proclamation to university students, calling on them to remain calm. A similar appeal was made by the rector and senate of the John Casimir University, warning that further disturbances could force the university authorities to suspend the matriculation of new students. In practice, the arrival of significant police forces in Lviv, including cadets from the police academy in Velyki Mosty, had a much greater effect. Although nationalist students attempted to provoke riots again, the situation gradually began to calm down.

On the morning of 1 December, a rally attended by approximately 2,000 people was held at the John Casimir University, during which demands were made for the resignation of Mayor Drojanowski, the introduction of a numerus clausus system at universities, an economic boycott of Jews and restrictions on their access to the liberal professions, and the immediate trial of Grodkowski's murderers. After the rally, contrary to the police ban, the participants went to St. Mary's Square with the intention of holding another demonstration. When the police dispersed the crowd using a motor pump, smaller groups of students scattered around the city and began attacking Jewish passers-by. Several dozen people were beaten. Fights and brawls also broke out in the afternoon. The police intervened several times, arresting over 40 people. On the night of 1–2 December, searches were carried out in the apartments of local nationalist leaders. Several people were arrested at that time.

In the following days, only sporadic incidents were reported. Among others, a student was arrested for sticking pieces of paper with a drawing of a pig on the backs of people entering Jewish shops. On 2 December, classes resumed at the Academy of Foreign Trade, on 3 December at John Casimir University, and on 5 December at the Lviv Polytechnic. On 4 December, the police confiscated 10,000 leaflets calling for an economic boycott of Jews from one of Lviv's printing houses. During those days, several more nationalist activists were arrested, including Klaudiusz Hrabyk, Adam Maria Macieliński, and Jan Ostoja Matłachowski.

=== Aftermath ===
As a result of the riots, 234 people, mostly Jews, reported to the emergency room. (Note: In 40 cases, doctors found that injuries or illnesses not resulting from the riots had been feigned (Mazur (2007, p. 235)).) The number of people who were injured but did not seek medical help is unknown. 97 people reported property damage as a result of theft or destruction. 50% of Jewish shops in Lviv were affected, as well as a number of shops belonging to Poles.

The police detained 90 students, 13 of whom were arrested and 43 were punished under administrative law. The city authorities imposed penalties on 185 people, half of whom were students. Most were fined, and some were also given custodial sentences. In April 1933, some of those who had taken part in the riots were tried and given suspended prison sentences.

The local leaders of the All-Polish Youth – Klaudiusz Hrabyk, Adam Maria Macieliński, and Jan Ostoja Matłachowski – were released from custody as early as 16 December. A few days later, they were received in audience by Bishops Franciszek Lisowski and Józef Teodorowicz, who during the meeting expressed their joy that "the youth leaders had not been broken in spirit".

== Epilogue ==
News of the riots in Lviv spread throughout Poland. Demonstrations and antisemitic excesses took place in Warsaw, Kraków, Poznań, Częstochowa, and Vilnus.

The Sejm discussed the riots on 6 December 1932. Three different motions were submitted by parliamentary groups. The Jewish group demanded an explanation of the causes of the riots and punishment for those responsible, while accusing the police of being too passive. In turn, the National Party accused the police of provoking young people and excessive brutality. The motion of the Polish Socialist Party assessed that the actions of nationalist youth were "highly disruptive," and accused the authorities of hindering the socialists' counteraction to the actions of the National Democracy by banning the Union of Independent Socialist Youth rally on 4 December. The riots were discussed at length during Sejm committee meetings.

On 7 December 1932, the Minister of Internal Affairs, Bronisław Pieracki, met with members of the Jewish Parliamentary Club and Jewish deputies of the Nonpartisan Bloc for Cooperation with the Government. He assured them that the authorities would take all measures to prevent similar incidents from happening again in the future. On the same day, Pieracki also received a delegation of Jews from Lviv, who presented, among other things, photographic documentation of the damage caused by the riots, appealed for help for the victims, and demanded that those responsible be punished.

The European and American press reported on the riots in Lviv. German newspapers devoted particular attention to them, describing the riots as a "pogrom".

Grodkowski's killer, Moshe Katz, was tried and sentenced to four years in prison.

In the following years, the anniversaries of Wacławski and Grodkowski's deaths were used by the All-Polish Youth to provoke anti-Jewish excesses, both in Lviv and in other cities.

== Bibliography ==
- Biedrzycka, Agnieszka (2012). Kalendarium historii Lwowa 1918–1939 [A Chronicle of the History of Lviv 1918–1939] (in Polish). Kraków: Universitas. ISBN 978-83-242-1678-9.
- Mazur, Grzegorz (2004). "Szkic do dziejów stosunków polsko-żydowskich we Lwowie w okresie międzywojennym" [An Outline of the History of Polish-Jewish Relations in Lviv in the Interwar Period]. In Alexandrowicz, Stanisław; Jasiewicz, Krzysztof (eds.). Świat NIEpożegnany. Żydzi na dawnych ziemiach wschodnich Rzeczypospolitej w XVIII–XX wieku [A World Not Yet Farewell. Jews on the Former Eastern Lands of the Polish-Lithuanian Commonwealth in the 18th–20th Centuries] (in Polish). Warsaw: Rytm. ISBN 83-7399-083-6.
- Mazur, Grzegorz (2007). Życie polityczne polskiego Lwowa 1918–1939 [The Political Life of Polish Lviv 1918–1939] (in Polish). Kraków: Księgarnia Akademicka. ISBN 978-83-7188-947-9.
- Piasecki, Waldemar (2015). Jan Karski. Jedno życie. Kompletna opowieść [Jan Karski: One Life, the Complete Story] (in Polish). Vol. I. Kraków: Insignis. ISBN 978-83-63944-68-1.
- Rędziński, Kazimierz (2016). "Studenci żydowscy we Lwowie w latach 1918–1939" [Jewish Students in Lviv in the Years 1918–1939]. Prace Naukowe Akademii im. Jana Długosza w Częstochowie. Pedagogika (in Polish). XXV. ISSN 1734-185X.
