= FC Pokuttia Kolomyia =

FC Pokuttia Kolomyia is a Ukrainian football club from Kolomyia.

== Football clubs in Kolomyia ==
It should be mentioned that before the World War II, in Kolomyia was an association football team with the same name based on the 49th Hutsul Rifle Regiment and played in the Stanislawow District League.

After World War II, in Kolomyia city existed different club Silmash owned by a local agrarian equipment factory and with the dissolution of the Soviet Union in 1994 the club was dissolved.

=== Pokuttia ===
The original FC Pokuttia was established in 1982 as Budivelnyk and represented a village Kornych and the Kolomyia Construction Company (Ukrainian: Коломийське будівельно-монтажне управління № 82). Its president and head coach became its player Mykhailo Uhorskyi. In 1985-1989 the club was known as Elektroosnastka. Since 1989 Pokuttia received its current name. In 1996 it debuted at professional level for the 1996-97 Ukrainian Second League. Following the 1997-98 Ukrainian Second League, the club was relegated back to amateurs and competed at regional level. In 2007 Pokuttia went bankrupt and was dissolved.

In 2011 Kolomyia was represented by another club FC Karpaty Kolomyia that originally represented a town of Pechenizhyn.

In summer of 2017 Pokuttia was revived and entered the amateur competitions.

== League and cup history ==
Season	Div.	Pos.	Pl.	W	D	L	GS	GA	P	Domestic Cup	Europe	Notes

== Notable players ==
- Roman Hryhorchuk

== See also ==
- FC Karpaty Kolomyia, originally represented Pechenizhyn, Kolomyia Raion
