= Mariusz Sawa =

Polish footballer

Personal information
- Date of birth: 7 September 1975 (age 51)
- Place of birth: Chełm, Poland
- Height: 1.72 m (5 ft 8 in)
- Position: Forward

Senior career*
Years	Team	Apps	(Gls)
1988–1989	Gwardia Chełm		
1989–1994	Polonia Warsaw		
1995	Górnik Łęczna		
1995–1996	Motor Lublin		
1996–1999	Avia Świdnik		
1999–2001	Lublinianka		
2001	Rovaniemen Palloseura	10	(2)
2001	Górnik Łęczna		
2002	Polonia Przemyśl		
2003	Lewart Lubartów		
2003–2004	MG MZKS Kozienice		
2005	POM Iskra Piotrowice		
2005–2006	Motor Lublin		
2006	Polonia Przemyśl		
2013–2015	KS Lublin		

Managerial career
- 2010–2012: Wisła Puławy
- 2012: Motor Lublin
- 2013–2014: KS Dąbrowica
- 2014–2015: Motor Lublin
- 2016–2017: JKS 1909 Jarosław
- 2018: Polonia Przemyśl
- 2018: Motor Lublin
- 2021: KS Wiązownica
- 2021: Tygrys Huta Mińska
- 2022: Pilica Białobrzegi
- * Club domestic league appearances and goals

Mariusz Sawa (born 7 September 1975) is a Polish professional football manager and former player.

== Playing career ==
Sawa began his career at Gwardia Chełm. In the 1992–93 season, he achieved promotion to Ekstraklasa with Polonia Warsaw. Next season, he played 23 Ekstraklasa games and scored one goal, in a match against Siarka Tarnobrzeg in May 1994. He later played for Górnik Łęczna, Motor Lublin, Avia Świdnik, KS Lublinianka, Rovaniemen Palloseura, Polonia Przemyśl, Lewart Lubartów, and MG MZKS Kozienice.

== Coaching career ==
In June 2010, Sawa was named manager of Wisła Puławy, winning promotion from the III liga in his first season, but in January 2012 his contract was terminated by mutual agreement. In May 2012, Sawa became manager of Motor Lublin, but he was sacked after six games of the 2012–13 season after a poor run of results. In 2013, he was hired to manage V liga club KS Dąbrowica.

In April 2014, he was appointed manager of Motor Lublin for the second time, and remained with the club until the end of the 2014–15 season. In January 2016, Sawa became head coach of III liga side JKS 1909 Jarosław. In the spring of 2018, he worked as coach for IV liga club Polonia Przemyśl.

On 29 June 2018, Sawa was appointed manager of Motor Lublin for the third time in his coaching career. He was sacked as coach on 17 September 2018 after the team suffered a 5–3 away defeat to Hutnik Kraków two days earlier. His contract was terminated on 28 September 2018.

== Managerial statistics ==
Team	From	To	Record					Ref
Team	From	To	G	W	D	L	Win %	Ref
Wisła Puławy	22 June 2010	17 January 2012	47	23	11	13	48.94	
Motor Lublin	6 May 2012	12 September 2012	10	4	4	2	40.00	
Motor Lublin	29 April 2014	30 July 2015	41	23	8	10	56.10	
JKS 1909 Jarosław	15 January 2016	30 June 2017	47	19	11	17	40.43	
Polonia Przemyśl	27 April 2018	30 June 2018	7	5	0	2	71.43	
Motor Lublin	1 July 2018	17 September 2018	8	4	3	1	50.00	

== Honours ==
=== Managerial ===
Motor Lublin

- Polish Cup (Lublin subdistrict regionals): 2014–15

JKS 1909 Jarosław

- Polish Cup (Jarosław regionals): 2016–17
