= KSZN Rypne =

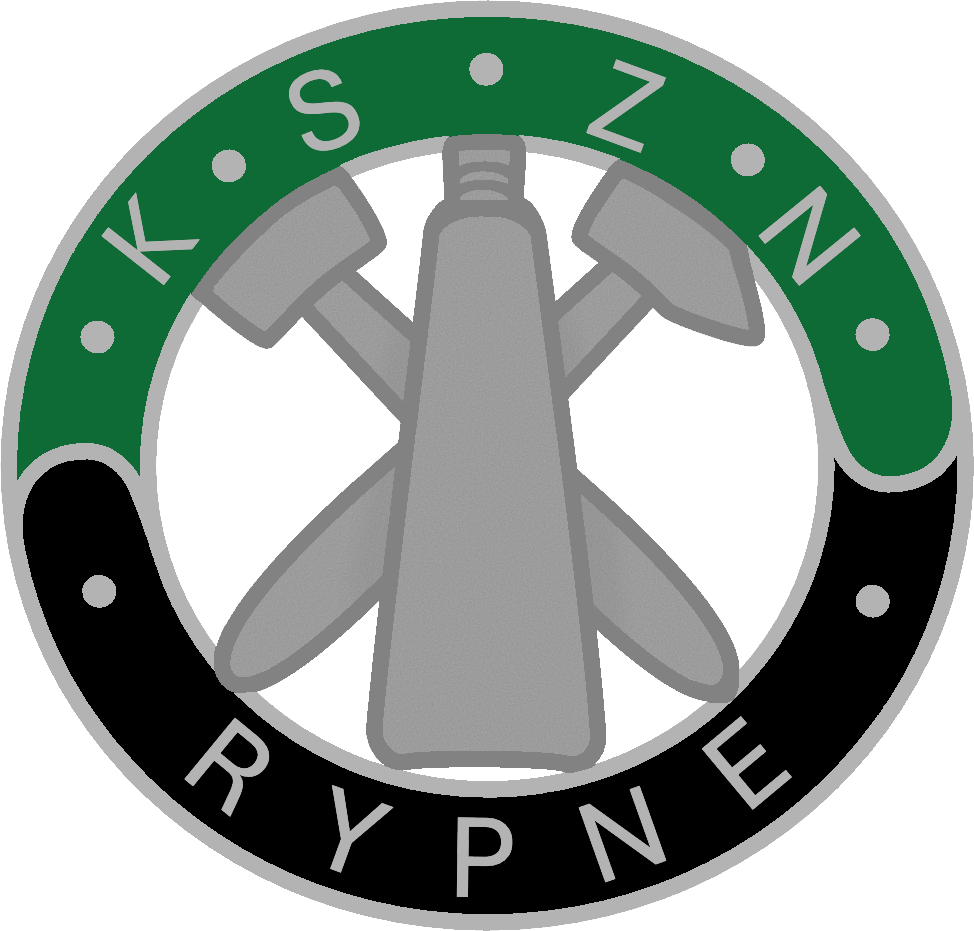
- Full name: Klub Sportowy Zakładów Naftowych Rypne (Rypne Oilworks Sports Club)
- Founded: 1932
- Dissolved: 1939
- Ground: Rypne Stadium
- President: Eng. J. Adamek
- League: Stanisławów District League
- 1938/1939: 3rd

KSZN Rypne (officially: Klub Sportowy Zakładów Naftowych Rypne) was an interwar Polish sports club based in the village of Rypne, in the Stanisławów Voivodeship (in present-day Ukraine). The club was disbanded during the Second World War.

== History ==
=== Foundation ===
In the 1930s, new oil and gas fields were discovered in Nadwórna County, Stanisławów Voivodeship. Oil wells in the region (at Borysław, Drohobycz as well at Rypne by Nadwórna) belonged to the state owned company Polmin. The director of the company, Eng. Kazimierz Sołtyński, was an active enthusiast of football and a pioneer of the sport in Galicia. As the head of the Polmin company, he set out to establish his own football club; at his initiative, a stunningly situated stadium amidst Carpathian pastures was erected in Rypne. Inaugurated on 14 August 1932, the hosts faced off against the renowned Lwów-based club Czarni Lwów (Note: Kazimierz Sołtyński was among the founders of Czarni Lwów and served as the club's chairman of between 1903 and 1907.) on the opening day.

=== Growth and expansion ===
The Stanisławów District League was established in 1934; already by 1935 KSZN Rypne entered playoffs, competing in the district league's Class B. That same season, the club was promoted to Class A.

As later recounted by locals, the club played well, was a solid mid-tier contender in the Polish league and often competed with clubs from Kraków and Lwów. Talented football players were invited to play for KSZN Rypne not only from the Stanisławów region, but also from other regions of the country—predominantly Greater Poland and Silesia. The athletes enjoyed good financial support in Rypne, as they were simultaneously employed in highly paid positions in the Polmin company. Amongst the club's ranks, players hailing from Ostrów Wielkopolski particularly distinguished themselves—striker Bronisław Młynarek and goalkeeper Jaskuła.

In 1938, KSZN Rypne secured second place in Class A of the district league and defeated the local powerhouse Rewera Stanisławów 3:2. Fielding a squad of young players, the club from Rypne was considered a promising team. Aside from its football section, the club also fielded a tennis team.

=== Scandal and disestablishment ===
The club found itself at the center of the last football scandal of the Second Polish Republic, which unfolded in the Stanisławów district and involved officials as well as players from KSZN Rypne and Pokucie Kołomyja. The affair was reported as follows in the Polish Sports newspaper Przegląd Sportowy, issue no. 59, dated 24 July 1939:

Word from Stanisławów has it that the last A-Class championship match, which sealed the relegation of Bystrzyca Nadwórna to Class B, has turned into a major sports affair. The authorities of the Stanisławów OZPN have revealed that the match between KS Rypne and Pokucie, which concluded with the extraordinary score of 18:1 in Pokucie's favor, had been fixed. Rypne is a very strong team, a contender for the championship title, and it is unthinkable that it could lose by such a wide margin to a club positioned at the bottom of the table.

The investigation conducted into the matter revealed that Pokucie's sports referee, Mr. Gold, arranged with the head of Rypne's football section, Mr. Zając, that Pokucie would win by a score of 17:0, that is, with a score needed for the club to remain within Class A. Zając reached an agreement by phone with Rypne's president, Eng. Adamek, who gave his consent to losing the match 3:0, or possibly 4:0.

This case was presented for discussion on the last meeting of the Games and Discipline Department of the StOZPN [Stanisławów District League], which resolved it accordingly: KS Rypne was fined 150 złoty and handed a one-month disqualification. Eng. Adamek was disqualified for two years, Zając for life, Gold was suspended, the captain of the Rypne team and the goalkeeper were both punished with one-year disqualification, all players of Rypne with 3-month disqualification. Moreover, the match was invalidated, scheduling a new match for July 30. The entire affair and its resolution by the StOZPN authorities caused a great stir in the sports circles of Stanisławów.

In September 1939, the Second World War broke out; the Soviet invasion derailed the ambitions of many Kresovian clubs. As a result, KSZN Rypne was dissolved. All in all, the club played a total of 52 matches in the StOZPN, earning 65 points with a total goal difference of +65 (138 scored; 73 conceded).

== Season standings ==
Season	League Playoffs			Notes
Season	League		Place	Notes
1935	III	Class B Stanisławów OZPN	▲1/6	Club enters Class B playoffs; promotion to Class A
1936	II	Class A Stanisławów OZPN	3/7	
1936/1937	II	Class A Stanisławów OZPN	3/7 (Note: Initially 8 clubs, however, Pogoń Stryj withdrew after just one match.)	
1937/1938	II	Class A Stanisławów OZPN	2/8	
1938/1939	II	Class A Stanisławów OZPN	3/8	
1939/1940	II	Class A Stanisławów OZPN	–	Playoffs could not take place due to the outbreak of World War II

== Honours ==
(Second Polish Republic) Stanisławów District League

- (silver) Runner-ups (1): 1937/38
- (bronze) Bronze medalists (3): 1936, 1936/37, 1938/39

== Famous players ==
- (Second Polish Republic) Bronisław Młynarek
