= Oleksandr Skotsen =

Ukrainian footballer

Oleksandr Skotsen'
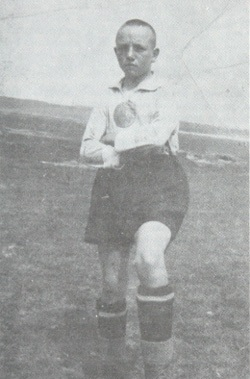
- Skotsen in 1930, age 12

Personal information
- Full name: Oleksandr-Bohdan Antonovych Skotsen
- Date of birth: 28 July 1918
- Place of birth: Lemberg, Austria-Hungary
- Date of death: 1 September 2003 (aged 85)
- Place of death: Toronto, Ontario, Canada
- Height: 1.72 m (5 ft 8 in)
- Position: Forward

Youth career
- ?–1931: Bohun Lwów
- 1931–1934: Tryzub Lwów

Senior career*
Years	Team	Apps	(Gls)
1934–1935	Tryzub Lwów		
1935–1939	Ukraina Lwów		
1940–1941	Dynamo Kyiv	13	(4)
1941–1943	Ukraina Lwów		
1944	Žilina	4	(5)
1945–1946	Ukraina Saltsburg		
1946	Ukraina Ulm		
1946–1947	Phönix-Alemannia Karlsruhe	25	(16)
1948	Olympique Charleroi		
1948–1950	Nice	48	(23)
1950–1951	Ukraina Edmonton		
1951	Toronto Ukrainians		
1951–1955	Toronto Tryzub	48	

Managerial career
- 1941–1942: Lviv opera
- 1943: Dovbush Kolomyia (playing)
- 1943: Lemko Sanok (playing)
- 1950–1951: Ukraina Edomonton (playing)
- 1950s: Canada (playing)
- 1964: Toronto Ukrainians
- * Club domestic league appearances and goals

Oleksandr Skotsen' (Ukrainian: Олександр-Богдан Антонович Скоцень, Polish: Aleksandr Bogdan Skoceń; 28 July 1918 – 1 September 2003) was a Ukrainian footballer, he played for Tryzub Lviv, Ukraina Lviv, Dynamo Kyiv, Olympique Charleroi and OGC Nice. In 1950 he arrived in Canada, where he played for Ukrainian teams Toronto Ukrainians and Toronto Tryzub.

== Biography ==
Skotsen started out in junior team of Bohun Lwów, but after it was closed down by the Polish authorities in 1931, he continued to play at Tryzub Lwów. In 1934 Skotsen debuted for the Tryzub's senior team. In 1935-1939 he played Ukraina Lwów in the district league of Lwów Voivodeship.

During the World War II and Soviet occupation in 1939 Skotsen was added to FC Dynamo Lviv. In January–April 1940 he was listed as a player of FC Dynamo Moscow. Later Skotsen was called on to army and was sent to organize army team in Lviv, DKA Lviv. From September 1940 to June 1941 he was on a roster of FC Dynamo Kyiv. After the Nazi invasion of the Soviet Union, Skotsen returned to Lviv where he coached a local team of the city opera and played for the revived Ukraina Lwów in 1941–1943. In 1943 Skotsen was a playing coach for Dovbush Kolomyia and Lemko Sanok. In 1944 he moved to Slovakia where he joined MŠK Žilina playing at the 1943–44 Slovenská liga. The next season Skotsen spent in Ukraina Saltzburg. In 1946-47 he played for Ukraina Ulm and Phönix-Alemannia Karlsruhe (a predecessor of Karlsruher SC).

In 1948 Skotsen played for Olympique Charleroi in the 1947–48 Belgian First Division. Couple of seasons between 1948 and 1950 he spent playing for OGC Nice. After that, he emigrated to Canada where he played for several Ukrainian teams.

== Managerial career ==
Skotsen was the head coach for the Toronto Ukrainians in the National Soccer League in 1964.

== Honours ==
- Lviv region (Polish regional A-Class)
  - Runners-up: 1936–37, 1937–38, 1938–39
- President of Poland's Football Cup
  - Winner: 1938
- Championship of Galicia Distrikt
  - Winner: 1942

== Publication ==
- "З футболом у світ. Спомини" (With football to the World. Recollections). Toronto, 1985
- "Львівський "батяр" у київському "Динамо" (Lviv "batiar" in Kievan "Dynamo"). Kiev, 1992 (republished)
