= Ripne =

Rural locality in Ivano-Frankivsk Oblast, Ukraine

Ripne Ріпне
- Village
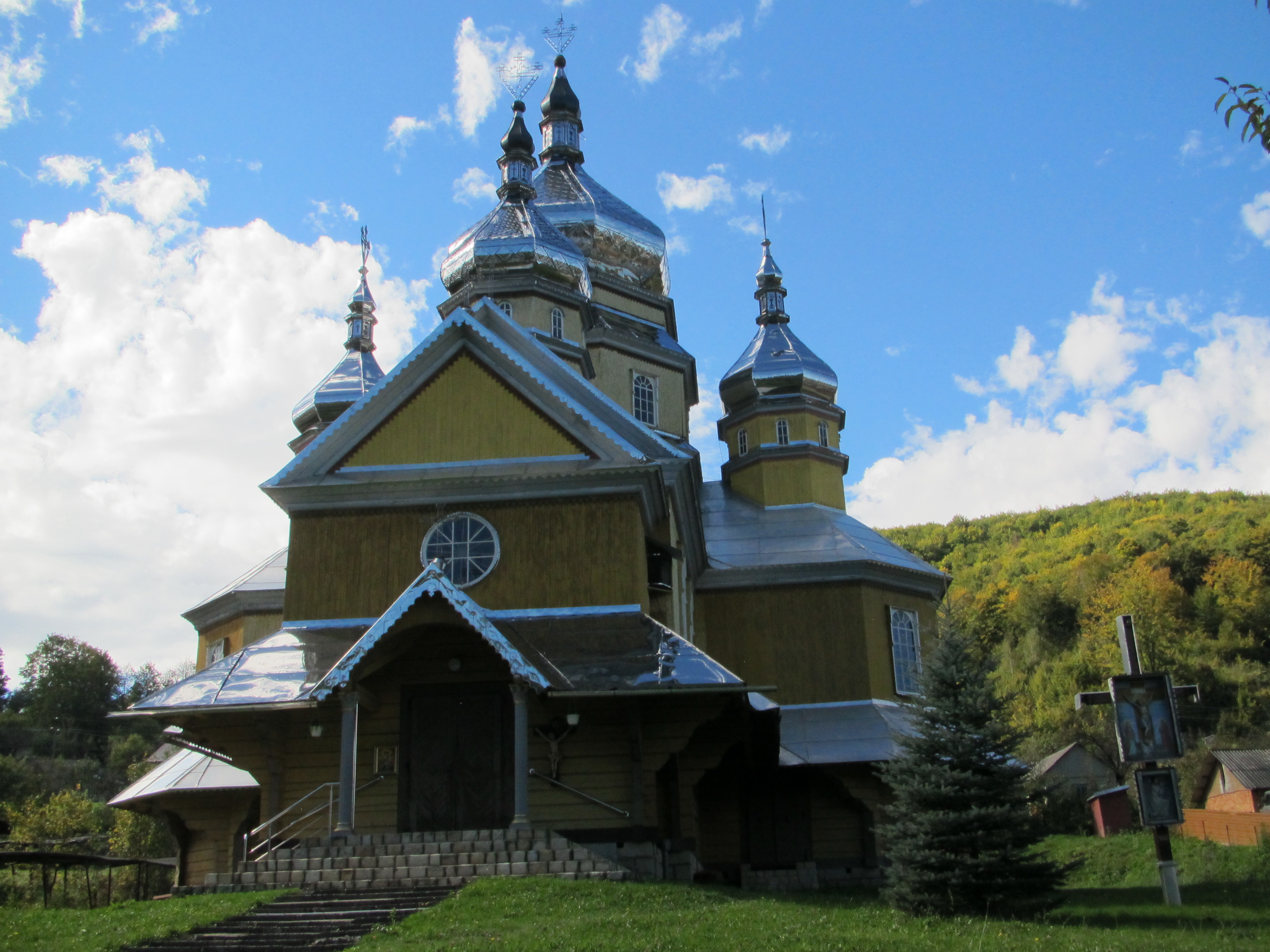
- Assumption Church in Ripne

- Location in Ukraine Ripne (Ukraine)
- Coordinates: 48°49′N 24°08′E
- Country: Ukraine
- Oblast: Ivano-Frankivsk Oblast
- Raion: Kalush Raion
- Village founded: 1766

Area
  - Total: 12.78 km^{2} (4.93 sq mi)
- Elevation: 523 m (1,716 ft)

Population (2001)
  - Total: 964
  - Density: 75.43/km^{2} (195.4/sq mi)
- Time zone: UTC+2 (EET)
  - Summer (DST): UTC+3 (EEST)
- Postal code: 77661
- Area code: +380 03474

Ripne (Ukrainian: Ріпне, Polish: Rypne) is a village in Kalush Raion, Ivano-Frankivsk Oblast, Ukraine. It belongs to Duba rural hromada, one of the hromadas of Ukraine. The village has a population of 964.

During the interwar period, the village was home to KSZN Rypne—a successful mid-tier sports club playing in the Polish league.

Until 18 July 2020, Ripne belonged to Rozhniativ Raion. It was the biggest settlement in the raion. The raion was abolished in July 2020 as part of the administrative reform of Ukraine, which reduced the number of raions of Ivano-Frankivsk Oblast to six. The area of Rozhniativ Raion was merged into Kalush Raion.
