= Ukraine (sports society) =

Ukraine (sports society) is a physical culture and sports association of Ukraine.

== History ==
At the end of the eighties (1987) the former sports associations of trade unions "Avanhard", "Burevestnik", "Vodnik", "Zenit", "Kolos", "Lokomotiv", and "Spartak" were united into the All-Union volunteer physical culture and sports association of trade unions (VDFSTP). After several years "Kolos" has separated from it and in 1991 VDFSTP was reorganized into the sports association of trade unions "Ukraine".

== Sports clubs ==
- SC Zirka 2002

== Olympic centers ==
=== Trade Union Federation of Ukraine ===
- Olympic sports training center "Spartak", Alushta
- Olympic sports training base "Avanhard", Yalta
- Sports training base of Olympic preparation "Sviatoshyn", Kyiv
- Rowing youth sports school "Slavutych", Kyiv
- Sports training base "Avanhard", Vorokhta

== See also ==
- Ukraina Lwów
