= Lower-level football leagues in Poland in the interwar period =

In the Second Polish Republic, there was not a national, Second Division, as we know it today, although the creation of the second division was proposed on several occasions. On Sunday, 26 September 1937 in Częstochowa, a conference of regional teams from across the nation took place, to discuss the creation of the league. Officials of several clubs arrived, such as Brygada Częstochowa, Gryf Toruń, Śmigły Wilno, Rewera Stanisławów, Dąb Katowice, Unia Sosnowiec, Strzelec Janowa Dolina, and WKS Grodno. Also, invited were officials of HCP Poznań, Podgorze Kraków, Naprzód Lipiny and Union Touring Łódź, but for unknown reasons they did not show up. The officials talked about creation of a National B-League, but nothing came out of this project. Instead, in the years 1921-1939, several Voivodeships held their own games and those leagues were known as A-Classes. In 1927, the elite Polish Football League was created, which by the late 1930s consisted of 10 teams. The teams that did not make it to the Ekstraklasa, played in the A-Classes.

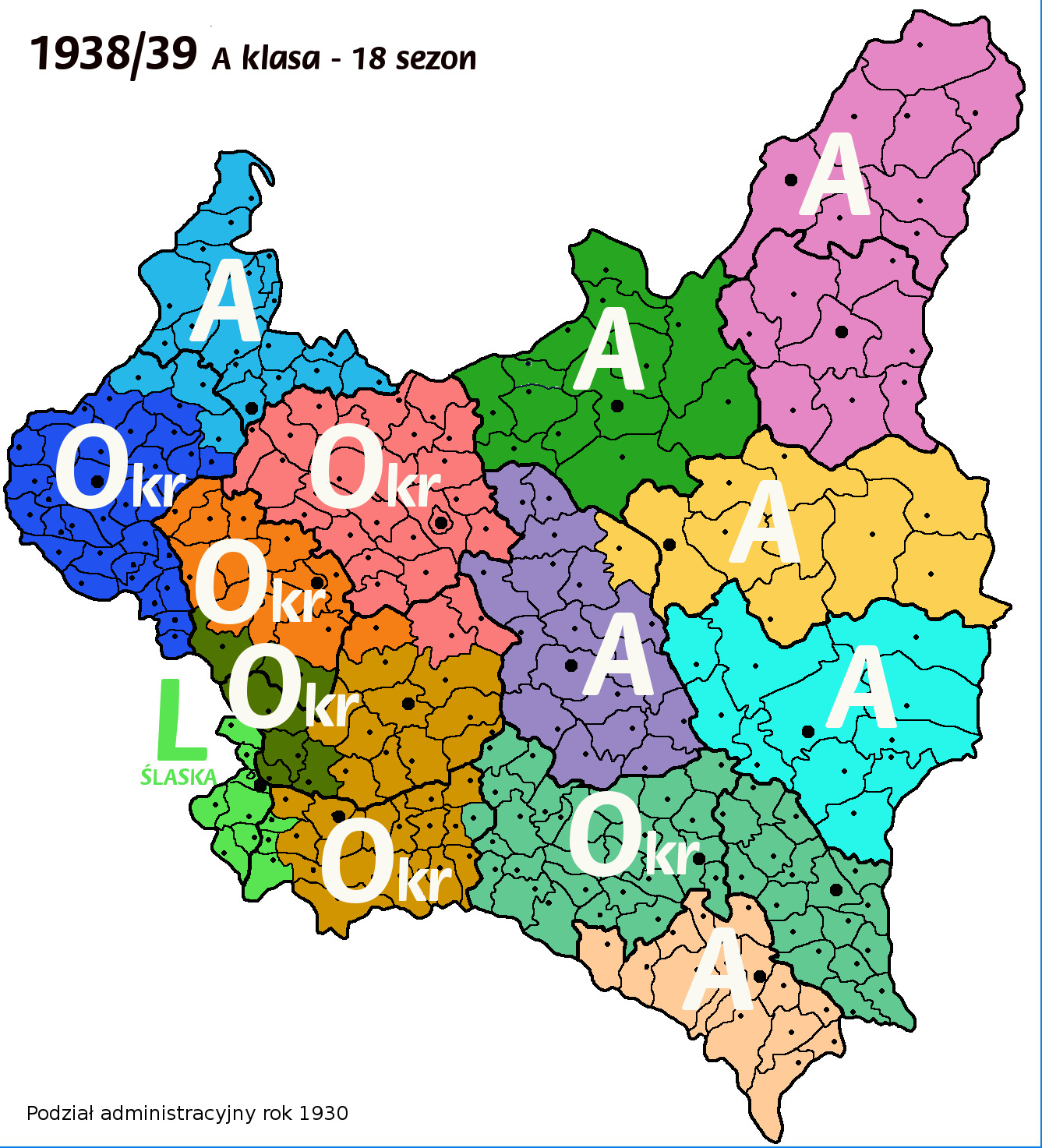
The system of Polish A-Classes in 1939

== A-Classes ==
In the year of the 1921 Polish Football Championship only five A-Classes managed to conclude the full seasons, namely: Poznań, Lwów, Kraków, Warsaw and Łódź. The next year they were joined by Wilno, Lublin (Volhynia) and Silesia.

Between 1927 and 1939 there were several A-Classes, such as:

- Kielce A-Class, from which in mid-1930s the separate, Zagłębie Dąbrowskie A-Class emerged, with teams from such cities as Sosnowiec, Będzin, Zawiercie or Częstochowa. After this, Kielce A-Class ceased to exist, and some of its teams, such as Star Starachowice, moved to Warsaw A-Class,
- Białystok - Grodno A-Class
- Kraków A-Class, also called Kraków League
- Łódź A-Class
- Lwów A-Class, also called Lwów League
- Polesie A-Class
- Pomerania A-Class
- Poznań A-Class
- Silesian A-Class, also called Silesia League (it was regarded as the strongest of all, with several top-quality teams and players)
- Stanisławów A-Class
- Volhynia A-Class
- Warsaw A-Class
- Wilno A-Class
- Zagłębie Dąbrowskie A-Class (since mid-1930s)

It must be mentioned that not all Voivodeships had their own A-Classes. Football system in some areas located mainly in the Eastern Provinces (Kresy Wschodnie) was not developed enough (or did not have enough teams) to keep their own A-Class Leagues. So, there was no Nowogródek Voivodeship A-Class, or Tarnopol Voivodeship A-Class. Instead, the existing teams from those regions played each other in knock-out stage games, thus establishing a regional Champion.

Interesting is the fact that in several cases, teams from one Voivodeship played in the A-Class of another region - e.g. Koszarawa Żywiec from Kraków Voivodeship, played in mid-1930s in the Silesian A-Class, SKS (Star) Starachowice, played in late-1930s in Warsaw A-Class, even though the city of Starachowice was located in Kielce Voivodeship, or Pogon Stryj, which played in Lwów A-Class, but the town of Stryj was located in the Stanisławów Voivodeship.

== B and C Classes ==
Also, there were third and fourth tier Leagues in Poland - B-Classes (usually covering the areas of 4-5 counties) and C-Classes. Champions of these divisions were automatically promoted to upper levels.

== The promotion to the Ekstraklasa ==
To get promoted to the elite, 10-team Ekstraklasa, it was not enough to win the A-Class games. The promotion was a long and arduous process, which can be best described by recollecting the games of Śląsk Świętochłowice, which was the winner of the 1938-1939 Silesian A-Class. In the early summer 1939, Śląsk started its way to the Ekstraklasa. In the first stage, it competed against champions of the neighboring A-Classes - Fablok Chrzanów (Kraków A-Class) and Unia Sosnowiec (Zagłębie Dąbrowskie A-Class). Śląsk, with such renowned players as Hubert Gad and Ewald Cebula, at home beat both Fablok and Unia 4-0. Away, it tied 1-1 with Fablok and won 3-2 with Unia, becoming the Champion of southwest Poland A-Classes. In August 1939, the second, national stage started. In it, Śląsk played champions of northwest Poland A-Classes (Legia Poznań), northeast Poland A-Classes (Śmigły Wilno) and southeast Poland A-Classes (Junak Drohobycz). Out of the four teams, three were going to be promoted. Śląsk managed to play only two games - 0-0 in Drohobycz and 2-1 at home with Śmigły Wilno. Then, on September 1, 1939, Germany attacked Poland and all matches were suspended.

== List of A-Class Teams in Poland, Spring 1939 ==
=== Białystok - Grodno A-Class Teams ===
In the fall of 1938 in this League played the following teams:

- WKS Grodno
- Makabi Białystok
- Strzelec Białystok
- Cresovia Grodno
- Makabi Grodno
- Ognisko Białystok
- Makabi Łomża

=== Kraków A-Class Teams ===
In the spring of 1939 in this League played the following teams:

- KS Chełmek
- Cracovia II Kraków
- Fablok Chrzanów
- Garbarnia II Kraków
- Grzegorzecki Kraków
- Korona Kraków
- Krowodrza Kraków
- Makabi Kraków
- KS Tarnów-Moscice
- Olsza Kraków
- Podgorze Kraków
- Tarnovia Tarnów
- Wisla II Kraków
- Zwierzyniecki Kraków

=== Łódź A-Class Teams ===
In the spring of 1939 in this League played the following teams:

- Burza Pabianice
- ŁKS Łódź
- ŁTSG Łódź
- PTC Pabianice
- SKS Łódź
- Sokol Pabianice
- Sokol Zgierz
- Strzelecki KS Łódź
- Union-Touring II Łódź
- WIMA Łódź
- WKS Łódź
- Zjednoczeni Łódź

=== Lwów A-Class Teams ===
In the spring of 1939 there were following teams in the Lwów A-Class:

- Czarni Lwów
- Hasmonea Lwów
- Junak Drohobycz
- Korona Sambor
- Lechia Lwów
- Pogon II Lwów
- Pogoń Stryj
- Polonia Przemyśl
- Resovia Rzeszów
- Sian Przemyśl
- RKS Lwów
- Ukraina Lwów
- WKS Jarosław

=== Pomerania A-Class Teams ===
In the spring of 1939 in this League played the following teams:

- Bałtyk Gdynia
- Ciszewski Bydgoszcz
- AKS Grudziądz
- Gryf Toruń
- Kotwica Gdynia
- Pomorzanin Toruń
- Polonia Bydgoszcz
- Unia Tczew

=== Poznań A-Class Teams ===
In the spring of 1939 there were following teams in the Poznań A-Class:

- HCP Poznań
- KPW Poznań
- Legia Poznań
- Pentatlon Poznań
- Polonia Leszno
- Polonia Poznań
- Stella Gniezno
- Warta II Poznań

=== Silesian A-Class Teams ===
In the spring of 1939, Silesian A-Class consisted of 12 teams. These were:

- BBTS Bielsko
- Concordia Knurów
- KS Chorzów Stary
- Czarni Chropaczow
- Dąb Katowice
- Ligocianka Ligota
- Naprzód Lipiny
- KKS Pogon Katowice
- Policyjny KS Katowice
- Polonia Karwina (this team was added in March 1939, after the annexation of Trans-Olza into Poland)
- Śląsk Świętochłowice
- Wawel Wirek

=== Stanisławów Liga okręgowa (1933-1939) ===
All time table

In italic are names of the clubs that did not participate in the last season.

#	Club	Seasons	Games	Points	Goals	St.Br.	Title(s)
1	WCKS (SKS) Rewera Stanisławów	6	65	96	214-83	2.578	4
2	KS Strzelec "Gorka" Stanisławów	6	66	91	133-81	1.642	1
3	KSZN Rypne	4	52	65	138-73	1.890
4	KS Strzelec "Raz, Dwa, Trzy" Stanisławów	5	60	49	91-138	0.659
5	KS Pokucie Kolomyja (WKS 49 pp)	5	60	37	73-168	0.435
6	KS Strzelec Broszniow,	3	40	31	61-102	0.598
7	WCKS (SKS) Pogon Stryj	1	13	21	38-8	4.750	1
8	KS Bystrzyca Nadworna	2	28	19	33-61	0.541
9	TESP Kalusz	1	14	14	25-20	1.250
10	KS Stanislawowia Stanislawow	3	24	13	30-61	0.492
11	ST Prolom Stanislawow	2	26	12	26-67	0.388

Notes:

- Pogon Stryj played here only for a single season and returned to the Lviv Liga okręgowa.
- Game Rypne - Pokucie Kolomyja 1:18 was canceled, due to suspected fraud.
- KS stands for Sport Club (Klub Sportowy)
- ST stands for Sport Association (Sportowe Towarzystwo)
- WCKS stands for Military-Civilian Sport Club (Wojskowe-Civilny Klub Sportowy)
- SKS stands for Sport Club Stanislawow (or Stryi)
- pp stands for Infantry Regiment

=== Volhynia A-Class Teams ===
In the spring of 1939 in this League played the following teams:

- Hasmonea Łuck
- Hasmonea Rowne
- Policyjny Klub Sportowy Łuck
- Pogon Rowne
- Strzelec Janowa Dolina
- Strzelec Kowel
- Strzelec Rowne
- Wojskowy Klub Sportowy Dubno
- WKS Luck

=== Warsaw A-Class Teams ===
In the spring of 1939 the following teams played in Warsaw A-Class:

- CWS Warszawa
- Fort Bema Warszawa
- Granat Skarzysko
- Okecie Warszawa
- Orkan Sochaczew
- PWATT Warszawa
- PZL Warszawa
- SK Starachowice
- Skra Warszawa
- Znicz Pruszków

=== Zagłębie Dąbrowskie-Częstochowa A-Class Teams ===
In the spring of 1939 in this League played the following teams:

- Brygada Częstochowa
- Brynica Czeladź
- CKS Czeladź
- Sarmacja Będzin
- RKS Skra Częstochowa
- Unia Sosnowiec
- Warta Częstochowa
- Warta Zawiercie
- Zaglebianka Będzin
- Zaglebie Dąbrowa Górnicza

== Schematic division of Class A in regional districts and selected sub-districts ==
Seasons >>>>	est. year	1920	1921	1922	1923	1924	1925	1926	1927	1928	1929	1930	1931	1932	1933	1934	1935	1936	36/37	37/38	38/39
		All-Polish championship							Regional leagues												
Poznań DFA	1921	(5)	6	6	6	6	X	6	5	11	10	10	10	10	10	10	10	10	8	7	7
Lwów DFA	1921	(4)	2	5	6	6	X	6	5	5/5	5/5	9	8	6/7	6/7	10	11	5/5	12	14	13
Kraków DFA	1921	(4)	4	6	6	6	X	6	9	11	10	12	8/6	5/6	9	9	10/8	11	12	12	11
Warszawa DFA	1921	(2)	3	5	4	6	X	6	8	11	6/5	10	10	11	10/{6}	12/{9}	12/{10}/6/4	6/6/{8}/5	8/8/{8}/5	12	10
Łódz DFA	1921	X	4	4	5	5	X	6	[8] 5	12	11	12	11	10	9	10	10	10	10	10	11
Śląsk DFA	1922	X	(14)	6	6	8	X	7	11	9/9/8	9/9/9	11/8/7	12	11***	12	12	11	10	9	10	11
Wilno DFA	1922	X	(4)	3	3	3	X	6	6	6	8	7	7	6	5	7	6	4	4	5	4
Lublin DFA	1922	X	X	4	4	5	X	6	7	9	6	6	6	4/4	4/3	6	7	7	6	6	5
Pomorski DFA**	1923	X	POZ	POZ	(4)	3	X	6	5	5	5	5	6	6	7	7	7	8	8	8	8
Kielce DFA*	1928	X	X	X	X	ŁÓD	X	LUB	WAW	8	5/6/4	8/5/6	6/5/4/7/5	10/7/6/5	5/5/7/4/6	10/7/4/5	10/6/6/5	10/7/5	10/7/3	KRA	KRA
Białostock DFA	1929	X	X	X	X	WIL	X	WIL	WAR	WAR	6	8	8	8	4/4	4/4	5/4	3/3/3	8	8	8
Polesie DFA	1929	X	X	LUB	LUB	LUB	X	WIL	LUB	LUB	4	6	5	5	4	3/3	3/3	3/3	3/3	3/3	4/4
Wołyń DFA	1930	X	X	LUB	LUB	LUB	X	LUB	LUB	LUB	LUB	6	7	8	8	8	10	5/5	8	8	8
Stanisławow DFA	1934	X	LWÓ	LWÓ	LWÓ	LWÓ	X	LWÓ	LWÓ	LWÓ	LWÓ	LWÓ	LWÓ	LWÓ	LWÓ	3	5	7	7	8	8
po.Nowogród		X	X	WIL	WIL	WIL	X	WIL	WIL	WIL	WIL	WIL	WIL	WIL	WIL	WIL	WIL	WIL	WIL	WIL	WIL
po.Tarnopol		X	LWÓ	LWÓ	LWÓ	LWÓ	X	LWÓ	LWÓ	LWÓ	LWÓ	LWÓ	LWÓ	LWÓ	LWÓ	LWÓ	LWÓ	LWÓ	LWÓ	LWÓ	LWÓ
po./Zagłębie DFA	1937	X	X	KRA	KRA	KRA	X	KRA	KAT	KIE	KIE	KIE	KIE	KIE	KIE	KIE	KIE	KIE	KIE	10	10
po.Częstochow		X	KRA	KRA	KRA	KRA	X	KRA	KAT	KIE	KIE	KIE	KIE	KIE	KIE	KIE	KIE	KIE	KIE	ZAG	ZAG
po.Radom		X	X	WAW	WAW	WAW	X	WAW	WAW	KIE	KIE	KIE	KIE	KIE	KIE	KIE	KIE	WAW	WAW	WAW	WAW

(*) - Kielce DFA został rozwiązany w 1937, w jego miejsce powołany Zagłębie DFA. Kielce jako podokręg przeniosły się do Krakow DFA
(**) - do października 1927 as Toruń DFA
(***) - from 1932 Class A of Śląsk District was called Śląsk League
(7) - w nawiasach rozgrywki nieoficjalne
po. - sub-district (Podokręgi)
7 - ilość drużyn występujących w A klasie
7/7 - ilość grup
{7} - tzw. grupa robotnicza (skupiająca kluby fabrykanckie i robotnicze)
7 - pogrubienie oznacza Ligę Okręgową
