= 49th Infantry Regiment (Poland) =

Unit of the Polish Army

The 49th Hutsul Rifle Regiment was a unit of the Polish Army, which belonged to the 11th Carpathian Infantry Division (Army Kraków). Stationed in the interbellum in the garrison in Kolomyja, it participated in the Polish September Campaign, fighting in southern Poland. It became famous after its night attack on parts of the German Independent Regiment SS-Standarte Germania.

== History ==
The Regiment was created in early 1919, and was based on the 15th Infantry Rifle Regiment of General Haller's Blue Army. In September 1919 it was renamed to 40th Kresy Infantry Rifle Regiment – and in March 1920 – to 49th Kresy Infantry Regiment. Most of its soldiers were Hutsuls (firstly volunteers, then conscripts), and this was recognized by the headquarters of the Polish Army, which on April 12, 1937, decided to name its 1st Battalion as the Hutsul Battalion of the Polish Legions, in appreciation of the outstanding World War I service of the Hutsul Company of the Polish Legions. Then, on March 4, 1938, the adjective Hutsul was attributed to the whole Regiment. Also, soldiers of the Regiment were ordered that during special events they should wear hats and coats based on traditional Hutsul folk clothes.

== Polish September Campaign ==
In early September 1939, the Regiment, commanded by Colonel Karol Hodala was moved west and ordered to defend the lines of the Wisłok, Wisłoka and San rivers, together with other units of the Army Karpaty. On Sunday, September 10, in the town of Błażowa, 30 soldiers of the Regiment under Lieutenant Edmund Szczot organized a trap on a German column, which belonged to the 4th Light Division. Eleven German soldiers were killed, and the Poles captured several documents, including maps and orders. Polish losses were limited to two wounded. However, German superiority was crushing and Polish units did not take advantage of the success. During the following days, the Regiment was forced to retreat, fighting several skirmishes with advancing Wehrmacht. Finally, on September 14, it found itself in the area of Sadowa Wisznia and Jaworów.

=== Night attack ===
On the night of September 15/16, 1939, the 49th Hutsul Rifle Regiment and the 98th Infantry Regiment (38. Reserve ID) attacked parts of the SS-Standarte Germania, which was stationed in the villages of Przelbice, Muzylowice, Mogiła and Czarnokonce. The SS had been ordered to close the roads leading east and prevent Polish troops from reaching Lwów. It has been established that in Muzylowice, where the main Polish attack took place, the following German units were stationed: the regiment's HQ, 3rd. battalion and support subunits. To catch the SS by surprise, Colonel Hodala and Colonel Bronisław Prugar-Ketling (commandant of the 11th Carpathian Infantry Division) ordered their soldiers to unload their rifles and use bayonets.

After 30-minutes of fierce hand-to-hand combat, which started at 9 pm, the Germans suffered heavy casualties, with at least 205 KIA and WIA. The commander of the III battalion SS-Obersturmbannführer Willy Koeppen and the regiment's aide-de-camp SS-Obersturmführer Schomburg were among those killed by bayonets. The regiment's HQ fled to Jaworów and German soldiers scattered in panic across the area. Several prisoners were taken and the SS lost almost all of its heavy equipment, including 16 75mm artillery pieces, 8 105mm artillery pieces, 15 AT guns, the majority of mortars, plus all vehicles (20 armored vehicles and transporters, 70 motorcycles, 50 trucks and cars). The battleground was witnessed on September 16 by General Kazimierz Sosnkowski, who later described these events in his book "Cieniom września". Colonel Prugar-Ketling also described the night attack in his memoirs "Aby dochować wierności". He wrote that the 30-minute attack was carried out in complete silence and the panic was visible the next day on the terrified faces of the dead German soldiers. Prugar-Ketling, who died in 1948, was shocked to see how much equipment was captured.

=== Aftermath ===
Even though Polish success was complete, the Germans quickly re-organized their defence, and called for aerial support. The Poles, on the other hand, did not have men experienced enough to utilise the captured equipment, and decided to destroy most of it with grenades. The 49th Hutsul Regiment managed to reach Lwów on September 19, and there it capitulated to the Red Army, together with Lwów's garrison.

== See also ==
- Ukrainian People's Army, several Hutsul units (such as Hutsul Marines) participated in the Soviet-Ukrainian War
- FC Pokuttia Kolomyia

== Sources ==
- Bronisław Prugar-Ketling "Aby dochowac wiernosci", Wydawnictwo Odpowiedzialnosc i Czyn 1990, (in Polish)
- Aleksander Smolinski. Ciekawe dzieje barwy 49 Huculskiego Pułku Strzelcow z lat 1937–1939, Pro memoria, styczen 2004, (in Polish)
- Kazimierz Sosnkowski, "Cieniom wrzesnia", Warszawa 1988, (in Polish)
- St. Komornicki, Z. Bielecki, W. Bigoszewska, A. Jonca, "Barwa i bron Wojska Polskiego 1939–1945", Warszawa 1990. (in Polish)
- Zaloga, Steven. "The Polish Campaign 1939", New York 1985, Pg 52.

== See also ==
- Polish army order of battle in 1939
- Polish contribution to World War II
- Stanisławów District League
