= Polmin =

Polish petroleum company

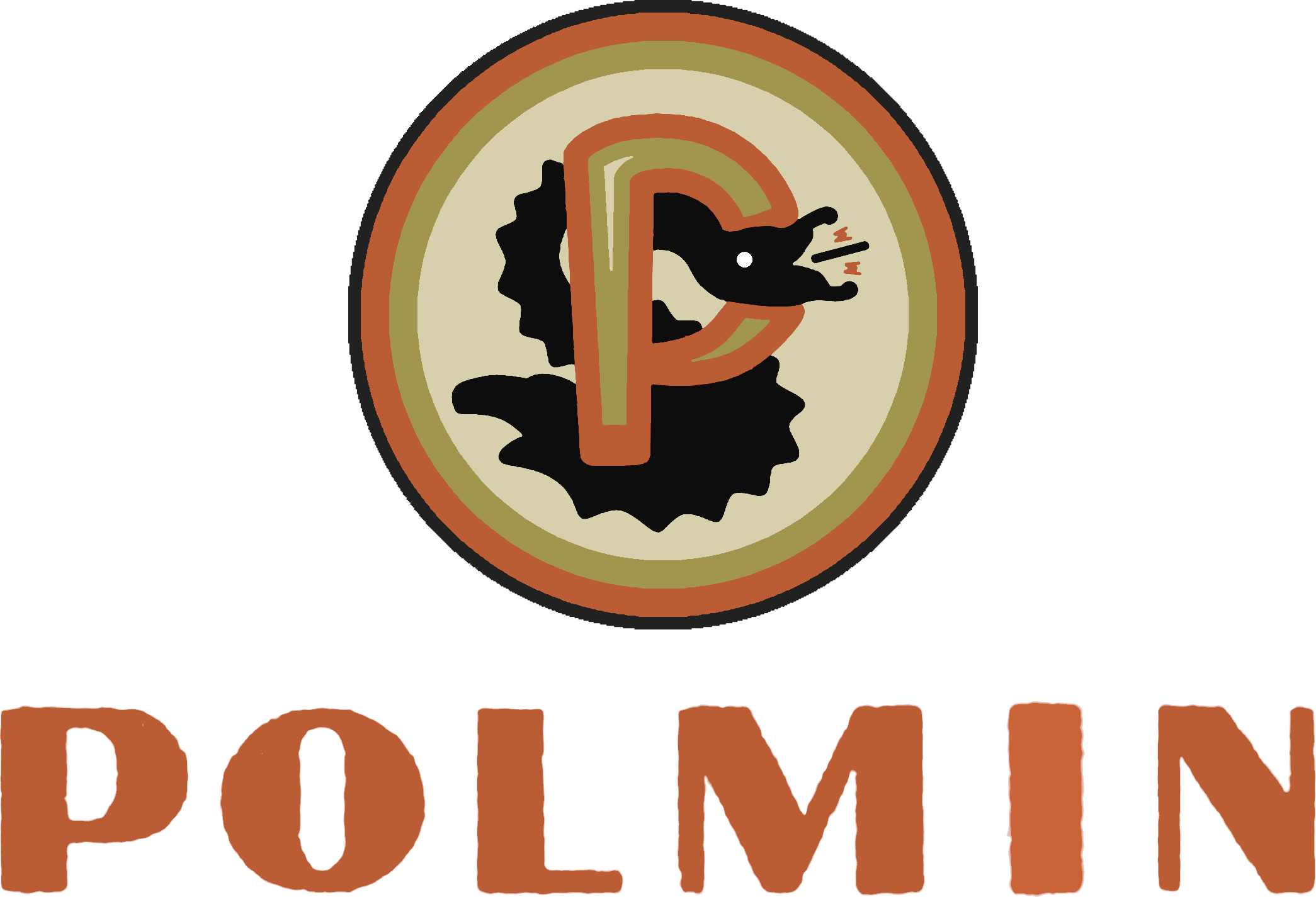

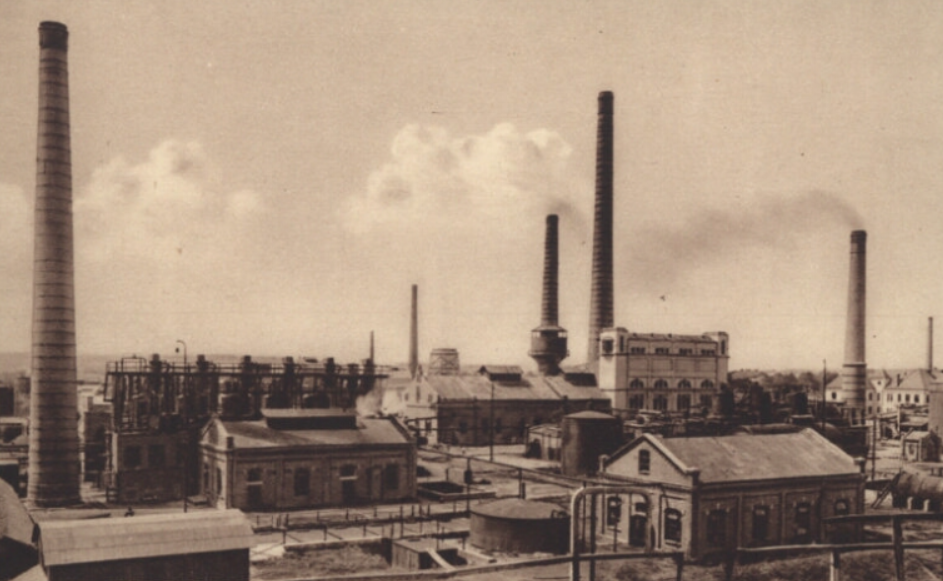
- The Polmin refinery in Drohobycz.
- Industry: Oil and Gas
- Founded: Austrian Galicia; 1909
- Headquarters: Lwów, Second Polish Republic
- Number of employees: ≈ 3000 (late 1930's).

Polmin (English: State Factory of Mineral Oils, Polish: Państwowa Fabryka Olejów Mineralnych) was an interwar Polish petroleum company. The company was founded in 1909 and nationalized in 1927. Crude run in 1930 reached over 731 thousand barrels, making Polmin the largest petroleum company in all of Interwar Poland with its annual capacity of 2.1 million barrels.

Polmin produced gasoline, kerosine, various oils including lubricating oils, cylinder oils and special oils, solid lubricants, vaseline, paraffin, candles and asphalt.

The company operated a large oil refinery in Drohobycz, which in late 1930s employed around 3000 people. The refinery in Drohobycz was one of the largest in all of Europe.

== History ==
The refinery in Drohobycz was built in 1909 and quickly surpassed all local rivals in capacity and production. Soon after its construction, the refinery transformed into the "C.K. Państwowa Fabryka Olejów Mineralnych". During the First World War, the refinery went through an almost year-long Russian occupation following their offensive into Galicia, during which the factory halted operations. During the rest of the war, the refinery produced petroleum products for the Austrian war effort.

Poland, serving as Austria-Hungary's successor in Galicia, inherited the "C.K. Państwowa Fabryka Olejów Mineralnych" and transformed it into the ""Polmin" Państwowa Fabryka Olejów Mineralnych w Drohobyczu". Polmin was nationalized shortly after Piłsudski's coup, in 1927.

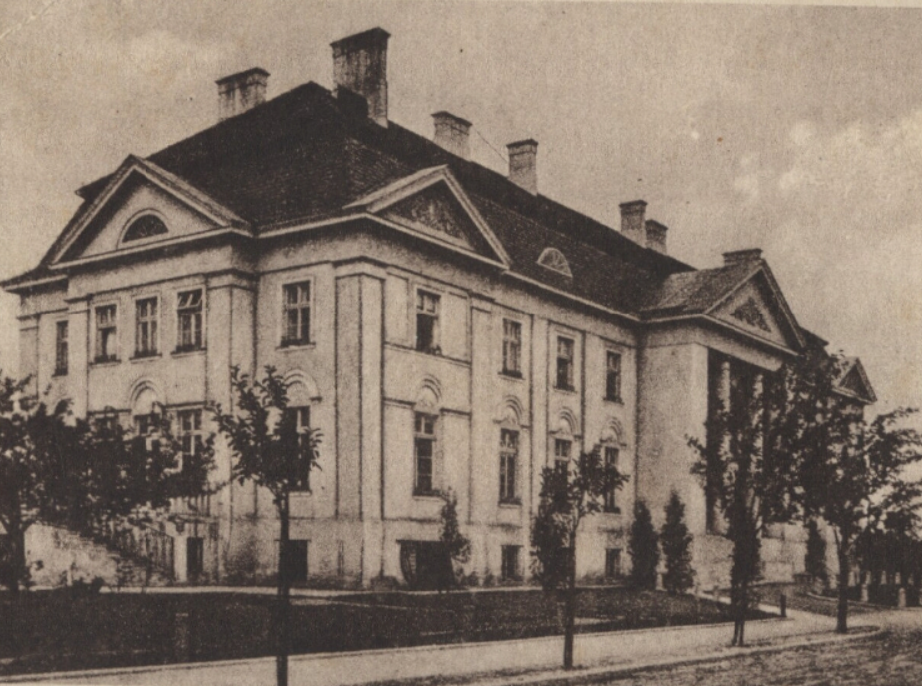
"Polmin" Casino in Drohobycz

During the interwar, Polmin's employees enjoyed a great deal of privileges: high wages, free transport within Drohobycz and other social programs, access to the "Polmin" Casino and the possibility of living in the Polmin workers' colony in Drohobycz. The Polmin Colony was built by the company, and was situated close to the refinery as well as the Drohobycz city centre. To satisfy its inhabitants, the colony possessed a school located at its centre, a football field and a swimming pool, and a various range of shops.

During the Second World War, the Polmin refinery was bombed by German Luftwaffe in 1939 during the joint German-Russian Invasion of Poland and later by the Americans in 1944 as a part of the Oil Campaign, in which the allies sought to cripple Germany's petroleum industry. Wartime bombing of Polmin sealed the company's fate as it became defunct.

== Sources ==
- Drohobycki Polmin. Fenomen największej polskiej rafinerii. Prezentacja Tomasza Kuby Kozłowskiego. (2021). Retrieved from: https://stayhappening.com/e/drohobycki-polmin-fenomen-najwi%C4%99kszej-polskiej-rafinerii-prezentacja-tomasza-kuby-koz%C5%82owskiego-E2ISTYM4B5Y
- Kolonia Polmin. (n.d.). Retrieved from: https://www.kawiarniany.pl/2019/07/30/kolonia-polmin-w-drohobyczu/
- McCabe, Richard. (1932). Petroleum Refineries in Foreign Countries, 1931. U.S. Government Printing Office.
- "Polmin": Państwowa Fabryka Olejów Mineralnych w Drohobyczu. (1927). Warsaw: Pomorska Druk. Rolnicza.
