= Stanisławów District League =

Former regional football championship in Poland

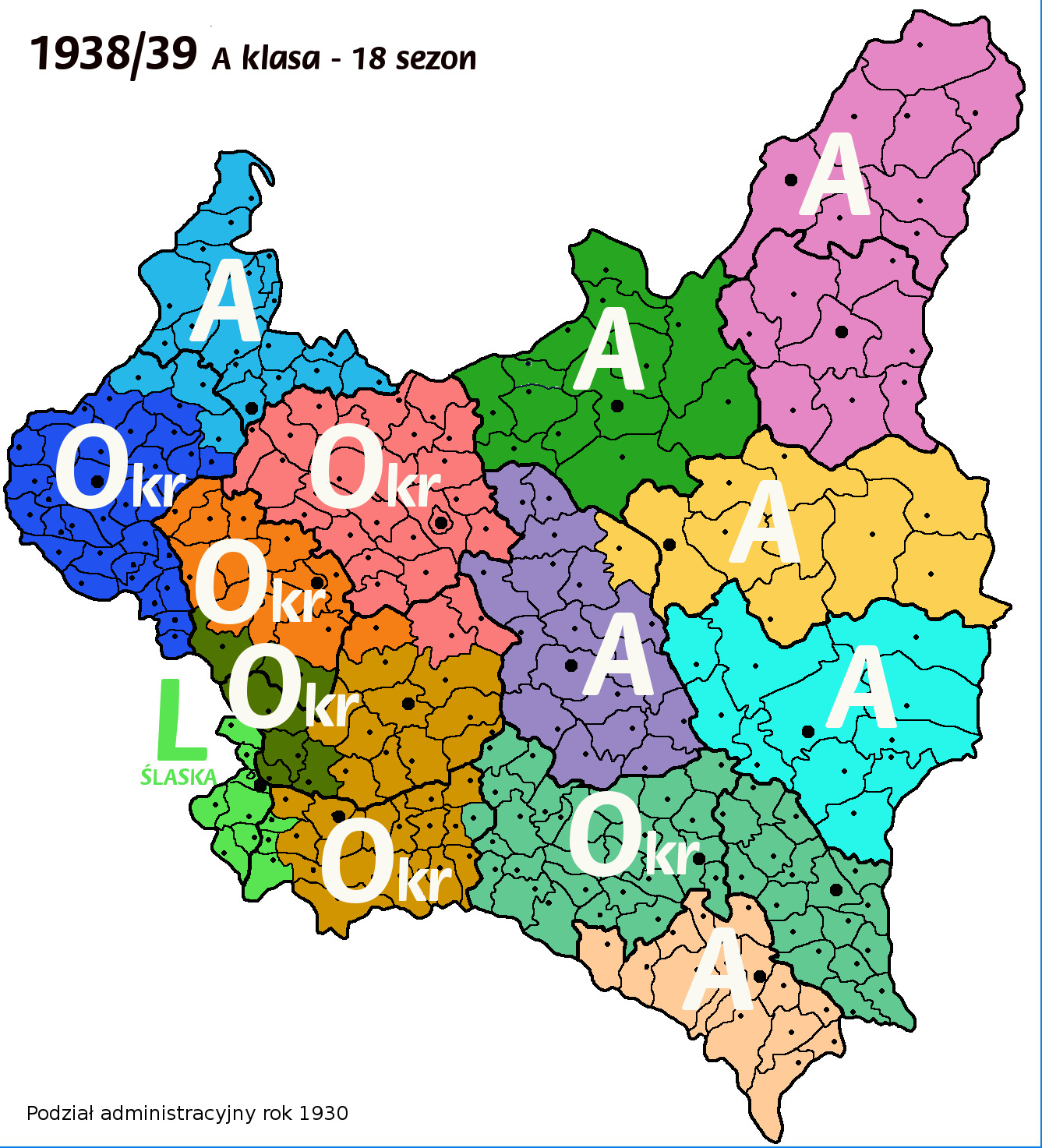
On the map identified in a light pink at the lower right corner

Stanisławów District League was a regional association football championship in the Stanisławów Voivodeship, Poland (then Second Polish Republic) in 1934–1939.

The league was created out of the Lwów District League on 15 April 1934 after receiving approval from the Polish Football Union on 21 March 1934. The Stanisławów District League is also considered to be a precursor of the Ivano-Frankivsk Oblast Football Federation championship in the modern Ukraine. Practically all of the clubs of the league represented various detachment of the Polish Armed Forces due to the Polish colonization policies in the Eastern Galicia (see Polonisation#Polonization in Eastern Borderlands (Kresy)).

== Champions ==
| Season | Champions | Runners-up | Third place |
|---|---|---|---|
| 1934 | Rewera Stanisławów | | |
| 1935 | Rewera Stanisławów | | |
| 1936 | Pogon Stryj | Strzelec "Gorka" Stanisławów | |
| 1936-37 | Rewera Stanisławów | Strzelec "Gorka" Stanisławów | |
| 1937-38 | Rewera Stanisławów | | |
| 1938-39 | Strzelec "Gorka" Stanisławów | Rewera Stanisławów | KSZN Rypne |
| 1939-40 | not finished | | |

== Cup finals ==
| Season | Champions | Runners-up | Third place |
|---|---|---|---|
| 1937 | Strzelec "Raz, Dwa, Trzy" Stanisławów | Bystrzyca Nadworna | 3:2 |
| 1938 | KSZN Rypne | Rewera Stanisławów | 3:2 |
| 1939 | no competition | | |

== All time table ==
In italic are names of the clubs that did not participate in the last season.

| # | Club | Seasons | Games | Points | Goals | St.Br. (Note: Ratio of goals scored to goals conceded, which used to be a tie breaker in several football competitions before the World War II.) | Title(s) |
| 1 | WCKS (SKS) Rewera Stanisławów | 6 | 65 | 96 | 214-83 | 2.578 | 4 |
| 2 | KS Strzelec "Gorka" Stanisławów | 6 | 66 | 91 | 133-81 | 1.642 | 1 |
| 3 | KSZN Rypne | 4 | 52 | 65 | 138-73 | 1.890 |
| 4 | KS Strzelec "Raz, Dwa, Trzy" Stanisławów | 5 | 60 | 49 | 91-138 | 0.659 |
| 5 | KS Pokucie Kolomyja (WKS 49 pp) | 5 | 60 | 37 | 73-168 | 0.435 |
| 6 | KS Strzelec Broszniow | 3 | 40 | 31 | 61-102 | 0.598 |
| 7 | WCKS (SKS) Pogon Stryj | 1 | 13 | 21 | 38-8 | 4.750 | 1 |
| 8 | KS Bystrzyca Nadworna | 2 | 28 | 19 | 33-61 | 0.541 |
| 9 | TESP Kalusz | 1 | 14 | 14 | 25-20 | 1.250 |
| 10 | KS Stanislawowia Stanislawow | 3 | 24 | 13 | 30-61 | 0.492 |
| 11 | ST Prolom Stanislawow | 2 | 26 | 12 | 26-67 | 0.388 |

Notes:

- Pogon Stryj played here only for a single season and returned to the Lwów District League.
- Game Rypne - Pokucie Kolomyja 1:18 was canceled, due to suspected fraud.
- KS stands for Sport Club (Klub Sportowy)
- ST stands for Sport Association (Sportowe Towarzystwo)
- WCKS stands for Military-Civilian Sport Club (Wojskowe-Civilny Klub Sportowy)
- SKS stands for Sport Club Stanislawow (or Stryi)
- pp stands for Infantry Regiment (49th Hutsul Rifle Regiment)
- TESP Kalusz was sponsored by TESP (Lwów)

== See also ==
- Ivano-Frankivsk Oblast Football Federation
