= Ukraina Lwów =

Interwar football club

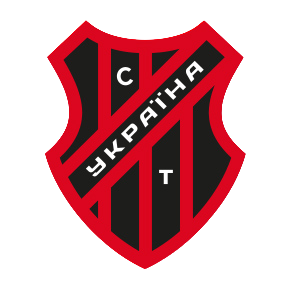
- Full name: Sports Society Ukraina Lviv
- Nickname: The Ukrainians
- Founded: 1911, 1921 and 1942
- Dissolved: 1914, 1939 and 1944
| Home colours colors | Away colours colors |

Ukraina Lviv (full name: Sports Society Ukraina Lviv, Ukrainian: Спортове Товариство «Україна» Львів, Polish: Ukraina Lwów) was a Galician and then Polish association football team of the ST Ukraina (Sports Society), located in the city of Lviv.

At that time the ST Ukraina was a sports society of ethnic Ukrainians in Poland and earlier Austria-Hungary. The football team existed in 1911–14, 1921–39 and 1942–44. The club was liquidated twice by the Soviet regime.

The society had an alternate name of Tryzub (Trident) which after World War II was used by Ukrainian emigrants to Canada such as the Toronto Tridents.

== History ==
The club was founded in 1911 based on the Ukrainian Sports Club (USK, which existed since 1904) on the initiative of professor Ivan Bobersky, who had previously been a teacher of physical education in a Ukrainian junior high school in Przemyśl. During their first three years of existence, Ukraina mostly played against other ethnic Ukrainian sides from Galicia, but in 1914, with the outbreak of World War I, the club ceased its activities.

Ukraina returned in 1921 and in 1928 became a member of the Polish Football Association. The team played in Lwów A-Class, which was equivalent of today's second level of football games (see: Lower Level Football Leagues in Interwar Poland). In the 1930s, Ukraina was one of the strongest football teams in southeastern Poland, its top player, Oleksandr Skotsen' went to France after World War II to play for OGC Nice (see: List of foreign Ligue 1 players). Altogether, Ukraina played twelve seasons in the Lwów A-Class, three times achieving second position (1937, 1938 and 1939). Overall, Ukraina gained 199 points over 182 games (with two points for a victory and one for a tie), with goal difference 433:351.

Ukraina played its last known game on August 27, 1939. On that day, using the field of the friendly side of Pogoń Lwów, the Ukrainians beat Kazimierz Gorski's team, Worker's Lwow 4–0.

Ukraina Lwów also had an ice hockey department, which in February 1938 became a sensational vice-champion of the Lwów region.

After World War II ST Ukraine was dissolved by the Soviet authorities. Former members reestablished the society in Montreal, Canada.

== See also ==
- Toronto Ukrainians
- Karpaty Lviv
- Ukraine (sports society)
