= MCS Rukh =

Stadium in Ivano-Frankivsk, Ukraine

Municipal Central Stadium (MSC) "Rukh"
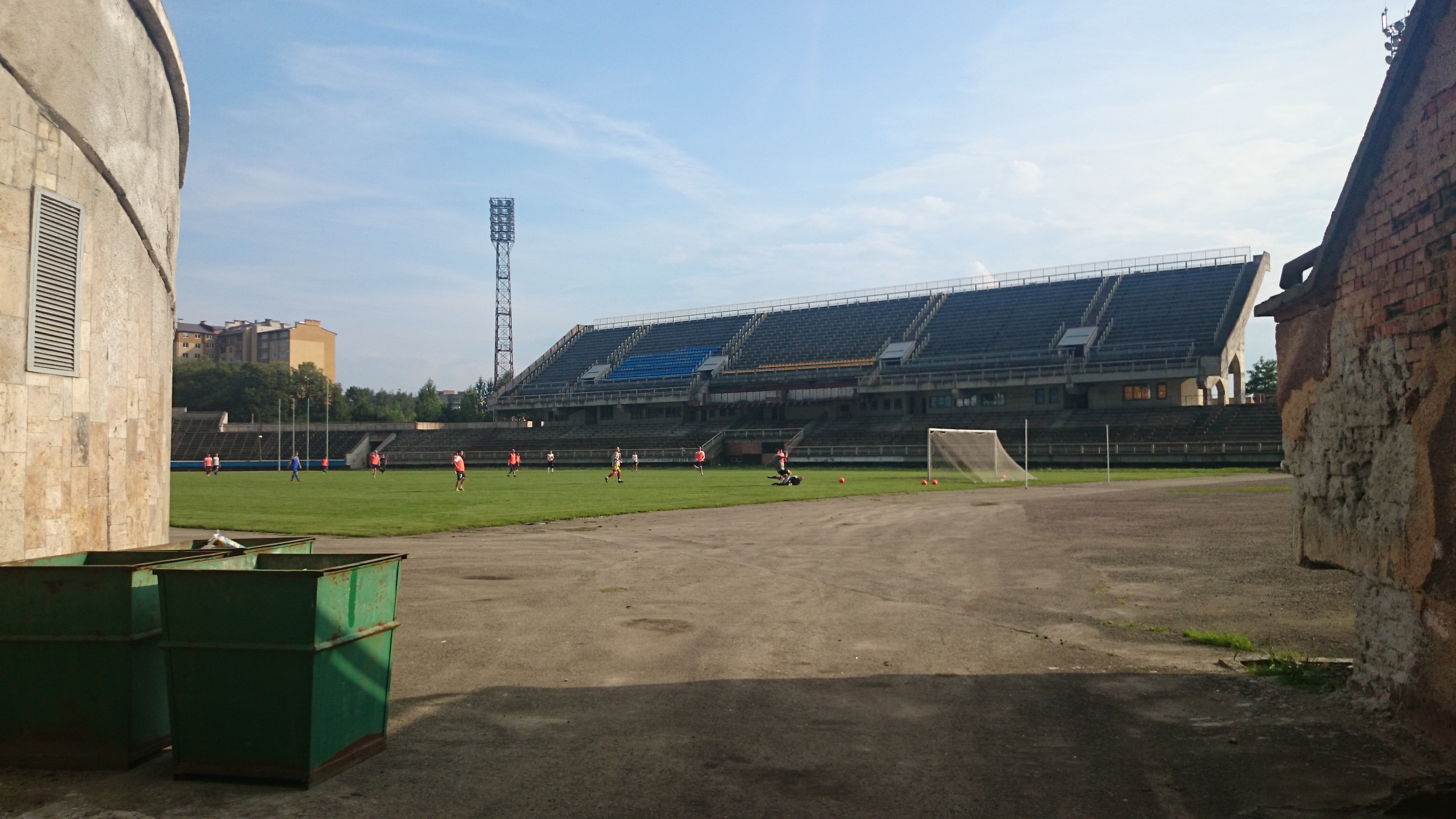
- Interactive map of Municipal Central Stadium (MSC) "Rukh"
- Former names: Municipal Central Stadium (until 1981); MCS Krystal (1981-1991)
- Location: Ivano-Frankivsk, Ukraine
- Coordinates: 48°54′29″N 24°41′46.50″E
- Owner: City Administration
- Capacity: 15,000 (football)
- Surface: Grass

Construction
- Opened: July 4, 1909
- Renovated: 1956 - 1957; 1969; 1987 - 1989; 1993 - 1996
- Expanded: 1927; 1957
- Closed: 1993 - 1994 (renovations)

Tenants
- Prykarpattia Ivano-Frankivsk; FSC Prykarpattya Ivano-Frankivsk (former); FC Spartak Ivano-Frankivsk (former); Rewera Stanisławów (former)

Municipal Central Stadium "Rukh" (Ukrainian: Міський Центральний Стадіон "Рух") is the multi-purpose central stadium of the Ivano-Frankivsk Oblast. The stadium is located at 128 Vyacheslav Chernovol Street, the city of Ivano-Frankivsk 750447. It has a capacity of 15,000 spectators and 6,200 individual plastic seats. By the end of its renovations the capacity of Rukh should be over 20,000 at the end of renovations.

== Overview ==
The stadium is being built in sectors, with only one remaining to be finished. The turf and the stadium in whole are useful for many sporting events. The stadium has two big stands located across one another and gather the majority of spectators. The stadium is located in the city park named after Taras Shevchenko. Nevertheless, according to stadion.lviv.ua of April 20, 2010 that is referencing to the head of the Capital Construction Directorate of Ivano-Frankivsk city administration V.Kovalchuk Rukh requires nearly four million hryvnia to bring Rukh to the initially pre-designed form.

Among the mentioned issues there were:

- a system of artesian aquifer and sprinklers,
- pavilions for the substitution players and coaches,
- a stand cover for at least 500 seats,
- dressing rooms for players and coaches,
- a press-media room,
- parking for buses and cars.

The stadium reconstruction has already stretched now for a record of over 20 years and became a joke in local folklore. In general the stadium is finished and meets the requirements of the Ukrainian First League, however still additional funds are needed to resume renovations. In 2008 the city mayor Viktor Anushkevichus informed that city is actively seeking new investors for the stadium and has intentions finally finish the overall reconstruction prior to the 2012 European finals. According to Galician Correspondent on July 15, 2010 the Ivano-Frankivsk Oblast parliamentarians petitioned to the Cabinet of Ministers to provide them with finds to improve the condition of the stadium.

== History ==
According to the local newspaper Match the first game took place on July 4, 1909 when the local sport club Rewera played against the Czarni-2 Lwow, losing 1:3. The match took place in the Jordan Park of the youth games and festivities in the city of Stanislau, the owner of which was Miejska Kasa Oszczednosci. The first stand was built in 1927 out of wood, which was in service until long after the establishment of FC Spartak Ivano-Frankivsk (1950s). Around the time the stadium was given the name Spartak (previous name is not known - presumably City Stadium of Potocki Park). In 1956-57 the first known reconstruction took place when the other 4,000-seat stand was erected totaling the stadium's capacity at 10,400. In 1969 there were built the floodlights towers and the wooden scoreboard was replaced with the electronic containing a clock as well.

In 1981 the stadium was renamed as Krystal (Ukrainian: Кристал). At the end of 1986 a new reconstruction of the stadium has started which was halted in 1989 due to lack of the funds. Some works were renewed in 1996 that eventually were once again brought to the halt. Until the 2006 season, the stadium was the home ground of FC Spartak Ivano-Frankivsk, the main soccer club/team in the oblast. Since 2007, the stadium is home to FSC Prykarpattya Ivano-Frankivsk, which used to play its games on the local university field (University of Nafty and Gazu). Rukh is located in the Shevchenko Memorial Municipal Park in the city of Ivano-Frankivsk. Not far from Rukh Stadium is a reserve stadium, Electron, which is also located in Shevchenko Park. That stadium was a temporary home for Ivano-Frankivsk clubs while major renovations occurred at Rukh Stadium.

Recently the reconstruction was renewed by a new design which was represented by the architect company Atelye Arkhitektury Plus (author Ya.Doroshenko). After the reconstruction as it was planned before the stadium's capacity should increase over 20,000 mark. The pictures of the proposed design were posted at the forum on the Ivano-Frankivsk Oblast football website on May 23, 2010 (the link provided below).

== Name ==
The stadium was renamed in 1989 in honor of the Civil movement Rukh led by Vyacheslav Chornovil (today political party Rukh).

== Other stadiums in Ivano-Frankivsk ==
Interesting is the fact that the issue with stadiums even stretches far into history according to the local sport newspaper "Match". Apparently in 1938 in the city of Stanislawow there was an issue of lack of fields for the local football teams, which was mentioned in some press-media "Podkapatckie echo sportowe" on October 2, 1938.

- Hirka (occupied by "Teplovyk"), the stadium is located by the City's Railroad Station. During the Soviet Union it carried the name of Lokomotyv. Hirka is one of the three oldest stadiums in the city along with already mentioned Rukh.
- Nauka, the stadium is located in the same city park as Rukh by a big city lake. Nauka Stadium is the property of the Prykarpattia National University of Stefanyk. That stadium carried the name of Elektron until 2000. The stadium was used by Spartak and also former Elektron Ivano-Frankivsk that in the Soviet times competed in the Cup of Ukrainian SSR. Nauka is the third of the oldest stadiums in Ivano-Frankivsk.
- Stadium of the University of Nafty and Hazu is located on campus of the mentioned university. It used to house Fakel Ivano-Frnkivsk.
- Stadium of Karpatpresmash was built in 1987 by the company of the same name is the "youngest" stadium of the city. Later the company carried the name of Avtolyvmash and eventually closed down. Currently the stadium is being unexploited and lacks maintenance.
- Stadium Yunist is located on Shkhevychi Street, not too far from the Ivano-Franko Drama Theater.

== See also ==
- FC Spartak Ivano-Frankivsk
- FSC Prykarpattya Ivano-Frankivsk
- Rewera Stanisławów, an army club since 1919
- Czarni Lwów
