= Krzysztof Jasiewicz =

Polish historian and politologist (born 1952)

Krzysztof Jasiewicz (born 1952) is a Polish historian specializing in the Polish–Soviet Union relations. He is a professor at the Political Studies Institute of the Polish Academy of Sciences.

== Biography and career ==
Jasiewicz is associated with the Political Studies Institute of the Polish Academy of Sciences. "Once a well respected scholar" on Polish–Jewish relations, in 2013 he was dismissed from his position as a research department chair after stating in an interview that "the Jews worked for centuries to bring the Holocaust about ... the scale of the German crime was only possible because the Jews themselves participated in the murder of their own people." This statement has been described by a number of sources as antisemitic. As of 2020 he is employed at the Institute in the Department of Eastern Problems Analysis.

== Research interests ==
Jasiewicz's earlier work, such as Pierwsi po diable. Elity sowieckie w okupowaney Polsce, 1939-1941 (First after the Devile: Soviet Elites in Occupied Poland, 1939-1941) published in 2002, demonstrated that collaboration with Soviets was cross-ethnic and included Poles as well as national minorities of Slavs and Jews. Jasiewicz's analysis of testimony by Anders' Army personnel affirmed Jan T. Gross's findings of prejudicial attitudes towards Jews and the Żydokomuna stereotype. Jasiewicz furthermore criticized those who treated Żydokomuna as historical fact rather than an antisemitic canard. However, Jasiewicz's subsequent work is within the "monumental" school of historiography represented by Marek Jan Chodakiewicz and Piotr Gontarczyk. In 2009, he published a review of Defiance in which he treated Żydokomuna as fact and accused Western historians of being preoccupied with the Holocaust.
