= Hasmonea Lwów =

- Full name: Żydowski Klub Sportowy Hasmonea Lwów
- Founded: 1908
- Dissolved: 1939
- League: Polish Football League 1927–1928

Hasmonea Lwów was a Polish-Jewish sports club based in the city of Lwów (now Lviv, Ukraine). Created in 1908 in Austria-Hungary, it was the first sports club exclusively for Jewish members. It was named after the Hasmonean royal dynasty. The full Polish name was Żydowski Klub Sportowy Hasmonea Lwów (Jewish Sports Club Hasmonea Club).

In the interbellum the Hasmonea was one of four Lwów-based clubs playing in the Polish First League and arguably the most popular Jewish football club in Poland. In 1928 it was ranked 13th in the league and relegated. There was a conflict between the club and PZPN officially due to failing to pay its dues. In 1929 the club paid its owed dues and next year revived its football team which competed in regional competition of Lwow Voivodeship. In 1932 the original stadium of the club was deliberately burnt down. The most popular football player primarily associated with the club was Zygmunt Steuermann.

Hasmonea was also famous for its excellent table tennis players. In 1933 they were team champions of Poland, and its top player, Alojzy Ehrlich, was three times winner of silver medals in the World Championships (1936, 1937, 1939). Another of the championship players during those years was Leopold Weiss, one of the few members of the club who like Ehrlich also survived the Nazi occupation of Lwów.

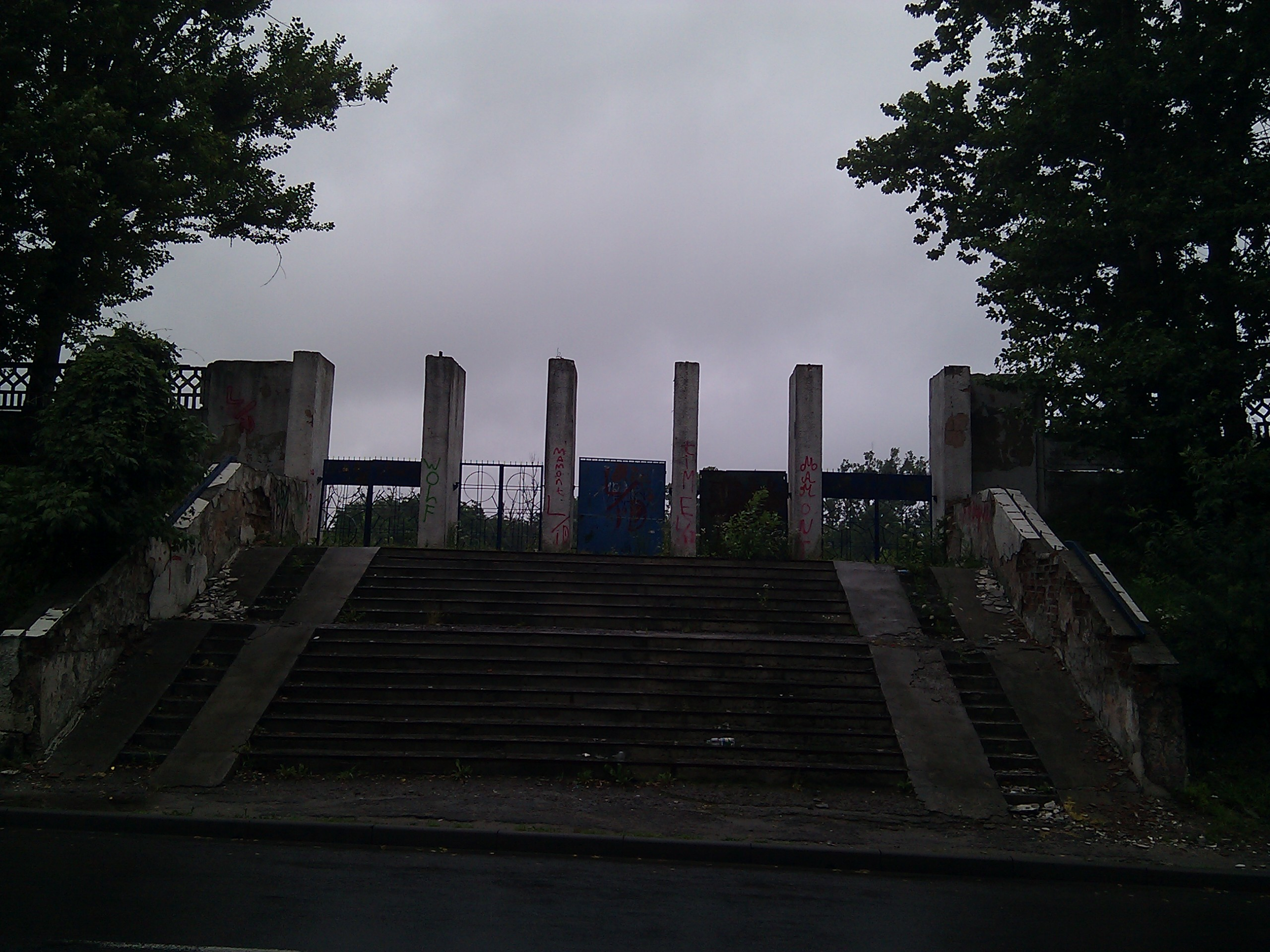
Torpedo Stadium (former Hasmonea) near Jewish Cemetery

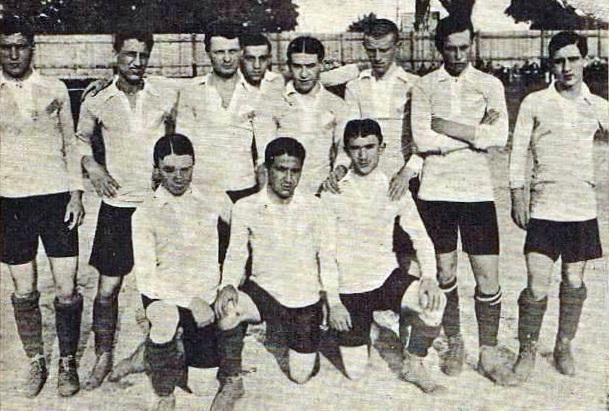
Hasmonea Lwów football team, circa 1915

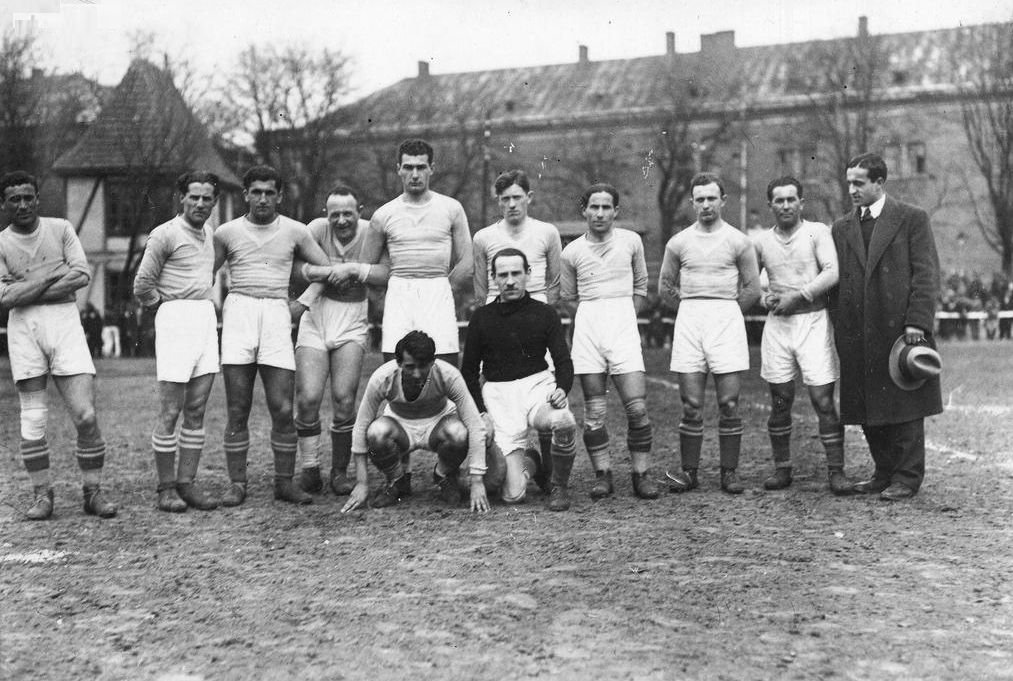
Hasmonea Lwow, 1935

== See also ==
- Maccabi (sports)
