= Polonia Przemyśl =

Polish football club

- Full name: Miejski Klub Sportowy; Polonia Przemyśl
- Nickname: Lonia
- Founded: 1909; 117 years ago (as San Przemyśl)
- Ground: Sanocka 7 Street Stadium
- Capacity: 1,600
- Chairman: Paweł Żurawski
- Manager: Paweł Młynarczyk
- League: IV liga Subcarpathia
- 2025–26: IV liga Subcarpathia, 9th of 18
- Website: https://www.mkspolonia.pl
| Home colours | Away colours |

Polonia Przemyśl is a Polish sports club, located in the south-eastern city of Przemyśl. Founded in 1909, it is one of the oldest sports associations in Poland.

== History ==
The club, whose hues are white-red-blue, supports two departments - football and men's basketball. The football team plays in the regional league, while the basketball side plays in the second division. Polonia's basketball team was a powerhouse in Poland in the mid-1990s, when it was second in Poland (1995) and third (1996).

The idea of creating a football club came from Lviv, which at the time was under Polish control. The team itself was created by Z. Ritterschild and J. Theobald. The new organization was formed in the fall of 1909, and adopted the name "San" - Przemyśl was still under Austrian rule, the name "Polonia" could not therefore be accepted. The first official meeting of the team 'San' took place in 1910, against the team's rival "Slavia", composed of Czech and Slovak military members in the garrison of Przemyśl. The team "San" lost their inaugural match 2–3.

In the years 1910–1914, the team played a total of 26 games, including a 2–1 victory in 1914 against Resovia.

Polonia finished the 2012–13 season seventh out of 16 teams in III liga. They collected 43 points from a total of 12 wins, 7 draws and 11 losses. They managed to score 52 goals overall, 33 home and 19 away, and conceded a total of 41, 15 home and 26 away, with an overall goal difference of 11.

== International matches ==
- 1924: against Turkey olympic football team: 3–3 (2–1)

== Achievements ==
- 6th place in I liga - 1951 (in one of the four groups)

== Fans ==
Fans of Polonia sympathise with Wisła Kraków. Their fiercest rivals are fellow locals Czuwaj Przemyśl with whom they contest a heated derby.
