= Rewera Stanisławów =

Polish football club

WCKS Rewera Stanisławów
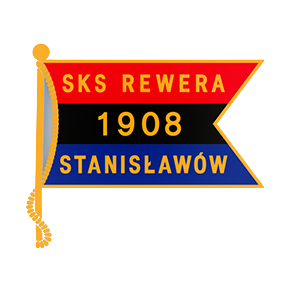
- Full name: Wojskowo-Cywilny Klub Sportowy Rewera Stanisławów
- Founded: 1908
- Dissolved: 1939
- Ground: Municipal Stadium in Stanisławów, Stanisławów, Poland (currently Ukraine)
- League: Stanisławów District League (II tier)

WCKS Rewera Stanisławów was a Polish football team, located in Stanisławów (now Ivano-Frankivsk), in the historic territory of Galicia.

== History ==
The club's hues were red and blue, same as the hues of one of the most popular Polish teams, Pogoń Lwów. Apart from football, Rewera, a member of the WCKS society, had other departments as well – volleyball, boxing, ice hockey, cycling, and track and field. All home games were held at a municipal stadium in Potocki Park, funded by the local savings bank. Among the activists of Rewera, was the father of Maryla Rodowicz, one of the most popular Polish singers.

The club was founded in 1908, when the city of Stanisławów (Stanyslaviv) belonged to the Austrian province of the Kingdom of Galicia and Lodomeria. The name of the city comes from the nickname of Polish magnate Stanisław Potocki, whose son, Andrzej Potocki, founded the city of Stanisławów. "Rewera" is a variation of a Latin proverb "re vera", which means "in fact".

The football team of Rewera never managed to qualify to the elite Polish Football League, however, it was a regular champion of the Stanisławów regional A-Class (see: Lower Level Football Leagues in Interwar Poland). In 1934 Rewera reached the second level semifinals of the qualifying games to the League, losing 0–5, 1–0 to Śląsk Świętochłowice. In 1938, Stanisławów's side lost qualifiers to Dąb Katowice (2–2, 1–6), Garbarnia Kraków (1–7, 1–4), and Czarni Lwów (1–0, 0–2).

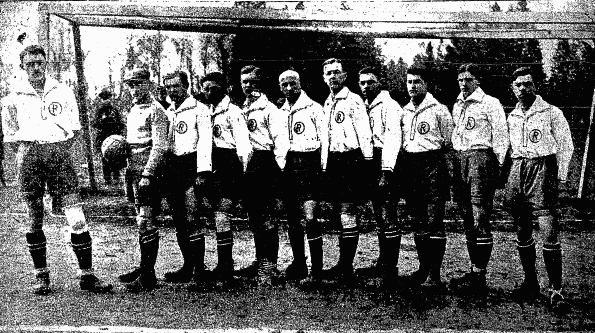
The team of Rewera Stanisławów in 1922.

On June 5, 1938, the club organized a tournament to commemorate its 30th anniversary, with four teams participating – Rewera, a Romanian side Dragos Voda from Cernăuți (champion of Bucovina), Cracovia, and a collective team of the Stanisławów Voivodeship. The event was organized by the 48th Infantry Regiment stationed in the city and led by Voivode of Stanisławów, Stefan Pasławski. The Cup was taken by the Cernăuți team with Rewera finishing second. The results of the tournament were as follows:

- Stanisławów Voivodeship – Dragos Voda 2:7,
- Rewera – Cracovia 5–4,
- Stanisławów Voivodeship – Cracovia 2–1,
- Rewera – Dragos Voda 0:4.

Following the German and Soviet aggression on Poland, Rewera ceased to exist in September 1939.

== See also ==
- Strzelec Górka Stanisławów

== Sources ==
- History of sports in Stanisławów 1908–1939,
