= Carlos Rivas (footballer, born 1953) =

Chilean footballer

Personal information
- Full name: Carlos Humberto Rivas Torres
- Date of birth: 24 May 1953 (age 73)
- Place of birth: Chimbarongo, Chile
- Height: 1.72 m (5 ft 7 1/2 in)
- Position: Midfielder

Youth career
- Audax Italiano

Senior career*
Years	Team	Apps	(Gls)
1970–1972	Audax Italiano	25+	(1+)
1973	Antofagasta Portuario	26	(3)
1974–1975	Regional Antofagasta	65	(24)
1976	Deportes Concepción	25	(5)
1977	Santiago Morning	37	(8)
1978–1982	Colo-Colo	122	(38)
1983	Santiago Wanderers	–	(–)
1983	Edmonton Eagles	?	(4)
1983	Unión Española	19	(12)
1983	Dinamo Latino		
1985	Dinamo Latino		
1986	Toronto Blizzard		
1986	Toronto Italia		
1987	Chile Lindo		

International career
1975–1982	Chile	24	(4)

Managerial career
- 1987: Chile Lindo
Medal record
Men's football
Representing Chile
Copa América
Runner-up	1979
- * Club domestic league appearances and goals

Carlos Humberto Rivas Torres (born 24 May 1953) is a Chilean former professional footballer who played as a midfielder.

== Career ==
Rivas was a midfielder for Colo-Colo in 136 official games over five seasons, and he scored 40 goals during that time. While he was on the team, the team won two national championships (1979 and 1981) and two Polla Gol championships (1981 and 1982). In 1983, he played in the Canadian Professional Soccer League with Edmonton Eagles. The remainder of the 1983 season he played in the National Soccer League with Dinamo Latino, and played once more with the club during the 1985 season. Rivas served as an assistant under Dave Turner in 1986, but still performed as a player for the Toronto Blizzard in the National Soccer League.

In late 1986, he signed with league rivals Toronto Italia. In 1987, he served as a player-coach in the National Soccer League with Chile Lindo. On 26 August 1987, he was suspended from the league for four years for his participation in a brawl between Chile and Windsor Wheels.

== International career ==
Carlos Rivas played for Colo-Colo, a Chilean football team, from 1978 to 1982.

Rivas also represented the Chile national team at the 1982 FIFA World Cup.

Rivas was a key figure in the development of a style of football involving prejugadas and creative offensive strategies.

== Managerial career ==
Rivas served as an assistant coach for the Toronto Blizzard in the National Soccer League in 1986 under head coach Dave Turner. In 1987, he served as a player-coach in the National Soccer League with Chile Lindo. In 2015, he joined the technical staff of the York Region Shooters in the Canadian Soccer League. He founded the CR Soccer Academy in Southern Ontario.

== Personal life ==
Rivas moved to Canada in 1984. He is the father of one son and one daughter. His son is Canadian soccer player Carlos Rivas Godoy.

He is the son-in-law of Adán Godoy, a Chilean former international goalkeeper, with whom he coincided in Santiago Morning in 1977.

== Honours ==
=== Player ===
Colo-Colo

- Chilean Primera División (2): 1979, 1981
- Copa Polla Gol (2): 1981, 1982
- Liguilla Pre-Copa Libertadores (1): 1982

Edmonton Eagles

- Canadian Professional Soccer League (1): 1983
