= 1986 National Soccer League (Canada) season =

National Soccer League
- Season: 1986
- Champions: Toronto Blizzard (regular season); Toronto Italia (playoffs, 9th title)
- League cup: Toronto Blizzard

The 1986 National Soccer League season was the sixty-third season under the National Soccer League (NSL) name. The season began in late May 1986 and concluded in early October 1986 with the NSL Championship final where Toronto Italia defeated Toronto Blizzard. Though the Blizzard would still manage to secure a treble after finishing first in the standings to claim the regular-season title, and defeating London Marconi for the NSL Ontario Cup. Toronto would earn the treble by defeating Vancouver Columbus Italia for the NSL Canadian Championship. The fourth piece of silverware was claimed by the Blizzard after defeating Luso Stars of the Quebec National Soccer League (LNSQ) for the NSL Canada Cup.

== Overview ==
As the formation of the Canadian Soccer Association's (CSA) sanctioned national professional league was becoming more apparent, and with its policy of no ethnic associated clubs, the National Soccer League (NSL) began organizing an alternative model to the CSA's version of a nationwide league. The newly appointed NSL commissioner and Toronto Italia owner Rocco Lofranco began the process of formalizing affiliated agreements with professional leagues throughout the country to implement a national model with a regional format. The regional format would consist of separate regional leagues with independent schedules with the regional champions qualifying for a postseason tournament, which would ultimately determine the national champion. The primary purpose of the regional format was to reduce the costly travel expenses associated with a national league employing an interlocking schedule. The NSL's presence was successfully established in British Columbia through an affiliated agreement with the Pacific Rim Soccer League and in Quebec with the creation of the Quebec National Soccer League (LNSQ) in 1986.

As the NSL expanded into British Columbia, and Quebec each league supplied their regional champions in a tournament for the NSL Canadian Championship intending to provide a Canadian representative to the CONCACAF Champions' Cup. The previous time a Canadian club competed in the Champions' Cup was in the 1976 CONCACAF Champions' Cup, represented by Toronto Italia. Several proposals and changes to the league's infrastructure were approved at the annual general meeting with the acceptance of the Petro Canada Soccer League as the NSL's developmental league, and the renaming of Toronto Dinamo to the Toronto Blizzard. All teams from the previous season returned with Windsor AC Roma renaming themselves as Windsor Wheels in an attempt to appeal to a wider audience.

=== Teams ===
Team	City	Stadium	Manager
London Marconi	London, Ontario	Cove Road Stadium	
St. Catharines Roma	St. Catharines, Ontario	Club Roma Stadium	Jimmy Douglas
Toronto Blizzard	Toronto, Ontario	Varsity Stadium	Dave Turner
Toronto Croatia	Etobicoke, Ontario	Centennial Park Stadium	Bruno Pilaš
Toronto First Portuguese	Toronto, Ontario	Lamport Stadium	
Toronto Italia	Etobicoke, Ontario	Centennial Park Stadium	Carlo Del Monte
Toronto Panhellenic	Scarborough, Ontario	Birchmount Stadium	Colin Byron
Windsor Wheels	Windsor, Ontario	Windsor Stadium	Vern Mittermeier

==== Coaching changes ====
Team	Outgoing coach	Manner of departure	Date of vacancy	Position in table	Incoming coach	Date of appointment
Windsor Wheels	(Scotland) Gus Moffat	dismissed	August 1, 1986	7th in August	Vern Mittermeier	August 1, 1986

Location of NSL teams outside of Toronto for the 1986 NSL season.

Location of NSL teams in Toronto for the 1986 NSL season.

== Final standings ==
Pos	Team	Pld	W	D	L	GF	GA	GD	Pts	Qualification
1	Toronto Blizzard (C)	14	10	1	3	34	12	+22	21	Qualification for Playoffs
2	Toronto Italia (O)	13	7	3	3	25	12	+13	17	Qualification for Playoffs
3	Toronto Panhellenic	14	6	4	4	23	23	0	16	Qualification for Playoffs
4	London Marconi	14	7	1	6	27	24	+3	15	Qualification for Playoffs
5	Toronto First Portuguese	14	6	3	5	17	18	−1	15	
6	Windsor Wheels	14	6	3	5	24	29	−5	15	
7	St. Catharines Roma	14	3	2	9	19	36	−17	8	
8	Toronto Croatia	13	0	3	10	9	30	−21	3	

Updated to match(es) played on September 18, 1986. Source:
Rules for classification: 1) points; 2) goal difference; 3) number of goals scored.
(C) Champions; (O) Play-off winners

== Playoffs ==
=== Semifinals ===
September 21, 1986	Toronto Blizzard	1–0	Toronto Panhellenic	Toronto, Ontario
	Abascal 90'	[ Report]		Stadium: Varsity Stadium

September 21, 1986	Toronto Italia	2–1	London Marconi	Etobicoke, Ontario
		[ Report]		Stadium: Centennial Park Stadium

=== Finals ===
September 24, 1986	Toronto Blizzard	0–1	Toronto Italia	Toronto, Ontario
20:00		[ Report]	Commisso	Stadium: Varsity Stadium; Attendance: 2,127; Referee: Tony Evangelista

== Cup ==
The cup tournament was a separate contest from the rest of the season, in which all eight teams took part. All the matches were separate from the regular season, and the teams were grouped into two separate divisions. The two winners in the group stage would advance to a singles match for the Cup. The winner of the league cup would face the Quebec National Soccer League (LNSQ), and the Pacific Rim Soccer League cup titleholders for the NSL Canada Cup.

=== Finals ===
September 19, 1986	Toronto Blizzard	4–3	London Marconi	Toronto, Ontario
	Marinaro; Ntsoelengoe,,	[ Report]	Phil Murphy, Louie Fotia	Stadium: Varsity Stadium

== NSL Canadian Championship ==
Since the 1986 season, a joint effort was conducted between the Pacific Rim Soccer League of British Columbia, National Soccer League, and the Quebec National Soccer League to provide a national champion. The original intention of the national tournament was to provide a potential Canadian representative for the CONCACAF Champions' Cup. The previous time a Canadian club competed in the Champions' Cup was in the 1976 CONCACAF Champions' Cup represented by Toronto Italia. Their regional champions would face each other in a single-elimination tournament with a single match for the championship.

=== Semifinals ===
September 26, 1986	Laval Lavallois	0–1	Vancouver Columbus Italia	Toronto, Ontario
		[ Report]	Frank Ciaccia	Stadium: Lamport Stadium; Attendance: 75

=== Finals ===
September 28, 1986	Toronto Blizzard	2–1	Vancouver Columbus Italia	Etobicoke, Ontario
	Marinaro 58'; Hooper 88'	[ Report]	John Guzzo 67'	Stadium: Centennial Park Stadium; Attendance: 1500

== NSL Canada Cup ==
The NSL Canada Cup was a separate tournament intended to crown a national league cup champion. The participating teams were the league cup titleholders from the Pacific Rim Soccer League of British Columbia, the National Soccer League, and the Quebec National Soccer League. The format of the competition was a single-elimination tournament with a single match for the national cup.

=== Semifinal ===
October 3, 1986	Toronto Blizzard	3–0	Vancouver Columbus Italia	Montreal, Quebec
		Report		Stadium: Université de Montreal Stadium

=== Final ===
October 5, 1986	Luso Stars Mount Royal	0–2	Toronto Blizzard	Montreal, Quebec
		[ Report]	Hooper 17'; Ntsoelengoe 58'	Stadium: Université de Montreal Stadium; Attendance: 532
