= 1988 National Soccer League (Canada) season =

National Soccer League
- Season: 1988
- Champions: Toronto Italia (regular season); Toronto Croatia (playoffs, 3rd title)
- League Cup: Toronto Croatia
- Top goalscorer: Carlos Salguero (18)

The 1988 National Soccer League season was the sixty-fifth season under the National Soccer League (NSL) name. The season began on May 10, 1988, and concluded on September 14, 1988, with Toronto Italia winning the NSL Championship by finishing first in the First Division. Toronto would also secure a double by defeating Montreal Superga of the Quebec National Soccer League (LNSQ) for the NSL Canadian Championship. The NSL Ontario Cup was won by Toronto Croatia on September 17, 1988. Croatia would face St. Leonard-Corfinium of the LNSQ for the NSL Canada Cup but was defeated by a score of 3-1. St. Catharines Roma II was the reserve division champions.

== Overview ==
Significant reforms were unanimously approved by the board of directors at the annual general meeting on January 23, 1988. Changes included an increase in club membership due to the return of a reserve division, which required each member to field a reserve team. The newly formed division would serve as a developmental platform for younger players and provide the senior teams with a larger pool of talent. The league's playing format was revised with the elimination of the postseason system, with the winner of the regular season determining the overall champion. The First Division retained the majority of members from the previous season, except for Nacional Latino and Toronto International.

The league organized a friendly tournament named the Friendship Cup, which involved Toronto Croatia, Toronto Italia, and Windsor Wheels in a series of matches against Cosenza and Palermo F.C. of Italy. Toronto Italia would defeat Cosenza in the finals to win the tournament title. The league continued its collaboration with the Quebec National Soccer League (LNSQ) to form a national championship by providing their league and league cup winners to crown a national champion.

=== Teams ===
Team	City	Stadium	Manager
America United	Toronto, Ontario		
Chile Lindo	Toronto, Ontario		
Mississauga Lakers	Mississauga, Ontario		
London Marconi	London, Ontario	Cove Road Stadium	Bill Gillis
St. Catharines Roma	St. Catharines, Ontario	Club Roma Stadium	
Toronto First Portuguese	Toronto, Ontario	Lamport Stadium	
Toronto Croatia	Etobicoke, Ontario	Centennial Park Stadium	Mišo Smajlović
Toronto Italia	Etobicoke, Ontario	Centennial Park Stadium	Ivan Marković
Toronto Panhellenic	Toronto, Ontario		
Windsor Wheels	Windsor, Ontario	Windsor Stadium	Mirko Bazic

Location of NSL teams outside of Toronto for the 1988 NSL season.

Location of NSL teams in Toronto for the 1988 NSL season.

== Final standings ==
Pos	Team	Pld	W	D	L	GF	GA	GD	Pts	Qualification
1	Toronto Italia (C)	18	14	2	2	59	10	+49	30	Qualification for Playoffs
2	Toronto Panhellenic	18	11	5	2	35	22	+13	27	
3	Windsor Wheels	18	12	2	4	52	26	+26	26	
4	Toronto Croatia (O)	18	11	3	4	49	18	+31	25	
5	St. Catharines Roma	18	6	3	9	34	40	−6	15	
6	Toronto First Portuguese	17	6	2	9	29	49	−20	14	
7	Chile Lindo	17	4	3	10	17	36	−19	11	
8	America United	18	4	3	11	20	37	−17	11	
9	Mississauga Lakers	18	4	3	11	17	48	−31	11	
10	London Marconi	18	3	2	13	19	46	−27	8	

Updated to match(es) played on September 17, 1988. Source:
Rules for classification: 1) points; 2) goal difference; 3) number of goals scored.
(C) Champions; (O) Play-off winners

== Cup ==
The cup tournament was a separate contest from the rest of the season, in which all ten teams took part. All the matches were separate from the regular season, and the teams were grouped into two separate divisions. The two winners in the group stage would advance to a singles match for the Cup. The winner of the league cup would face the Quebec National Soccer League (LNSQ) cup titleholder for the NSL Canada Cup.

=== Finals ===
September 15, 1988	Toronto Croatia	2–1	Windsor Wheels	Etobicoke, Ontario
	Mike Lupenec 10' (o.g.); Drago Šantić 20'	Report	Victor Quni	Stadium: Centennial Park Stadium

September 17, 1988	Windsor Wheels	1–1	Toronto Croatia	Windsor, Ontario
	Mike Lupenec 55'	Report	Bakota 70'	Stadium: Windsor Stadium; Referee: Mladen Moric

== NSL Canadian Championship ==
Since the 1986 season, a joint effort was conducted between the Pacific Rim Soccer League of British Columbia, the National Soccer League, and the Quebec National Soccer League to provide a national champion. Their regional champions would face each other in a singles match for the championship. The Pacific Rim Soccer League participated in the first tournament but ceased operations in 1987. While their league cup champions would compete for the NSL Canada Cup. Toronto Italia would win the championship by defeating Montreal Superga of the Quebec National Soccer League (LNSQ).

September 25, 1988	St-Leonard Corfinium	2–1	Toronto Croatia	Saint-Leonard, Quebec
	Windsor Vertus; Paul David	Report	Zoran Narjanovic
