= 1985 National Soccer League (Canada) season =

National Soccer League
- Season: 1985
- Champions: London Marconi (regular season); Toronto Italia (playoffs, 8th title)
- League cup: Dinamo Latino

The 1985 National Soccer League season was the sixty-second season under the National Soccer League (NSL) name. The season began on May 12, 1985, and concluded in early October 1985 with the NSL Championship final, where Toronto Italia successfully defended their title against Windsor AC Roma. London Marconi secured the regular-season title by finishing first in the standings, and Dinamo Latino won the NSL Cup.

After the conclusion of the 1984 season, the North American Soccer League (NASL) ceased operations, with former NASL member Toronto Blizzard joining the National Soccer League, as the league remained one of the few professional soccer leagues operating throughout the country.

== Overview ==
The demise of the American-based North American Soccer League (NASL) in late 1984 brought about a significant change to the Canadian soccer landscape, as the NASL contained several Canadian teams throughout its existence. Once the NASL ceased operations, Canada was without a national major soccer league, as its previous attempt at organizing a domestic national league in 1983 failed after a single season. In relation to the void of a national top-tier league, the Ontario-based National Soccer League (NSL) announced its intentions of expanding nationally and received corporate sponsorship from Molson Brewery. The NSL was aided by the addition of the former NASL club Toronto Blizzard, as the club's owners purchased the NSL franchise rights of Dinamo Latino in June 1985. According to league bylaws, the Blizzards operated under the name Toronto Dinamo as the name change required the approval of the league's board of directors. The NSL managed to expand into Quebec through an affiliated league known as the Quebec National Soccer League (LNSQ), which officially debuted the following season.

Simultaneously, the Canadian Soccer Association (CSA) also began making preliminary plans for a potential domestic national soccer league to address the void. Though the NSL ownership was attempting national expansion, several of their noted clubs (Toronto Croatia, Toronto Dinamo, Toronto Italia, and Toronto Panhellenic) submitted applications to the CSA-supported league. The plan was officially sanctioned by the CSA with the league expected to debut for the 1987 season, but unfortunately, the majority of the NSL clubs were rejected as the CSA adopted a policy to Canadianize the league with no ethnic affiliated clubs. Only Toronto Dinamo, under its previous name as the Toronto Blizzard, was granted a franchise. The membership in the NSL increased to eight teams with Windsor AC Roma being granted an NSL franchise, which marked the return of professional soccer to Windsor, Ontario, since the 1978 season when the Windsor Stars competed in the league.

=== Teams ===
Team	City	Stadium	Manager
London Marconi	London, Ontario	Cove Road Stadium	Charlie Spence
St. Catharines Roma	St. Catharines, Ontario	Club Roma Stadium	Jimmy Douglas
Toronto Croatia	Etobicoke, Ontario	Centennial Park Stadium	Branko Mileunic
Toronto Dinamo	Toronto, Ontario	Lamport Stadium	Dave Turner
Toronto First Portuguese	Toronto, Ontario	Lamport Stadium	
Toronto Italia	Etobicoke, Ontario	Centennial Park Stadium	
Toronto Panhellenic	Toronto, Ontario	Lamport Stadium	Mike Ristich
Windsor AC Roma	Windsor, Ontario	Windsor Stadium	Gus Moffat

==== Coaching changes ====
Team	Outgoing coach	Manner of departure	Date of vacancy	Position in table	Incoming coach	Date of appointment
Windsor AC Roma	Ilario Bontorin	resigned	April 24, 1985	preseason	(Scotland) Gus Moffat	April 30, 1985
Toronto Dinamo	Louis Caruso	replaced	July 1985	3rd in July	(England) Dave Turner	July, 1985

Location of NSL teams outside of Toronto for the 1985 NSL season.

Location of NSL teams in Toronto for the 1985 NSL season.

== Playoffs ==
=== Finals ===
October 12, 1985	Windsor AC Roma	1–1	Toronto Italia	Windsor, Ontario
17:00	Ian Parratt	Report	Herberth Gallo	Stadium: Windsor Stadium

October 14, 1985	Toronto Italia	1–0	Windsor AC Roma	Etobicoke, Ontario
	Risnita 69'	Report		Stadium: Centennial Park Stadium
