= 1983 National Soccer League (Canada) season =

National Soccer League
- Season: 1983
- Champions: Toronto Panhellenic (regular season); Toronto Italia (playoffs, 6th title)
- League cup: Toronto Italia
- Top goalscorer: Cesar Figueredo (14)

The 1983 National Soccer League season was the sixth season under the National Soccer League (NSL) name. The season began in May 1983 and concluded in early October 1983 with the NSL Championship final, where Toronto Italia secured the title against Dinamo Latino in a penalty shootout. Toronto would also secure the double by defeating Toronto Panhellenic for the NSL Cup. Toronto Panhellenic achieved a milestone in league history as it won its first regular-season title.

== Overview ==
Before the commencement of the regular outdoor season, the National Soccer League (NSL) operated an indoor season for the winter months. When the regular season debuted, the league faced competition from the newly formed Canadian Professional Soccer League (CPSL) as it became the country's first truly national professional soccer league. The CPSL had an NSL presence as both Hamilton Steelers and Toronto Croatia (operated as Mississauga Croatia) were participating members in the league while still retaining reserve teams in the NSL. The national experiment ended disappointingly as Inter-Montreal FC and Toronto Nationals departed from the league midway through the season, which forced an early postseason and ultimately collapsed after one season. On the other hand, the NSL strengthened its ties with the North American Soccer League (NASL) as the Toronto Blizzard and Toronto Italia secured a talent exchange deal.

The membership in the league decreased to eight teams as the Bradford Marshlanders requested a sabbatical, and the Toronto Falcons joined the Liga Hispanoamerica de Football Amateur (LHFA).

=== Teams ===
Team	City	Stadium	Manager
Dinamo Latino	Toronto, Ontario	Lamport Stadium	Jorge Piotti
Hamilton Steelers B	Hamilton, Ontario	Brian Timmis Stadium	
London City	London, Ontario	Cove Road Stadium	
St. Catharines Roma	St. Catharines, Ontario	Club Roma Stadium	
Toronto Croatia B	Etobicoke, Ontario	Centennial Park Stadium	
Toronto First Portuguese	Toronto, Ontario	Lamport Stadium	Jorge Testas
Toronto Italia	Etobicoke, Ontario	Centennial Park Stadium	Omar Sívori; Néstor Rossi
Toronto Panhellenic	Toronto, Ontario	Lamport Stadium	Germán Sánchez

Location of NSL teams outside of Toronto for the 1983 NSL season.

Location of NSL teams in Toronto for the 1983 NSL season.

== Final standings ==
Pos	Team	Pld	W	D	L	GF	GA	GD	Pts	Qualification
1	Toronto Panhellenic (C)	28	17	8	3	51	21	+30	42	Qualification for Playoffs
2	Toronto Italia (O)	28	15	8	5	51	30	+21	38	Qualification for Playoffs
3	Dinamo Latino	28	14	6	8	36	26	+10	34	Qualification for Playoffs
4	Toronto First Portuguese	27	12	5	10	40	43	−3	29	Qualification for Playoffs
5	St. Catharines Roma	28	11	5	12	36	33	+3	27	Qualification for Playoffs
6	Toronto Croatia B	28	8	5	15	28	40	−12	21	Qualification for Playoffs
7	London City	28	8	1	19	30	47	−17	17	
8	Hamilton Steelers B	27	5	4	18	30	62	−32	14	

Updated to match(es) played on September 28, 1983. Source:
Rules for classification: 1) points; 2) goal difference; 3) number of goals scored.
(C) Champions; (O) Play-off winners

== Playoffs ==
=== Finals ===
September 30, 1983	Dinamo Latino	2–0	Toronto Italia	Toronto, Ontario
20:00		[ Report]		Stadium: Lamport Stadium

October 2, 1983	Toronto Italia	2–0 (4–3 p)	Dinamo Latino	Etobicoke, Ontario
	Quiroga; Moniz	[ Report]		Stadium: Centennial Park Stadium

== Cup ==
The cup tournament was a separate contest from the rest of the season, in which all eight teams took part. All the matches were separate from the regular season, and the teams were grouped into two separate divisions. The two winners in the group stage would advance to a two-legged match final for the Cup.

=== Finals ===
August 28, 1983	Toronto Italia	3–1	Toronto Panhellenic	Toronto, Ontario
	Risnita 44'; DiFlorio 72', 81'	[ Report]	Joe Pellegrino (o.g.)	Stadium: Varsity Stadium
