= Chile Lindo =

Canadian soccer team

- Full name: Toronto Chile Lindo
- Founded: 1975
- Dissolved: 1989
- Stadium: Lamport Stadium; Toronto, Ontario
- League: National Soccer League

Chile Lindo was a soccer club based in Toronto, Ontario. The club was founded in 1975 and originally played in the Liga Hispanoamerica de Football Amateur (LHFA). After several successes' at the amateur level, the club was granted a franchise in the National Soccer League (NSL) in 1987. Lindo played in the NSL for two seasons from 1987 till 1988. The club's franchise was revoked in 1988 after a series of on-field incidents.

The club played their home matches at Lamport Stadium in Toronto, Ontario.

== History ==
Toronto Chile Lindo was formed in 1975 and represented the Chilean Canadian community in the Greater Toronto Area. The club competed in the Liga Hispanoamerica de Football Amateur (LHFA). In 1985, Chile secured the league title and repeated its success the following season. Lindo along with two other Latin American-based clubs Nacional Latino and Toronto International were given franchises in the National Soccer League (NSL) in 1987. The club recruited former Chilean international Carlos Rivas as their head coach.

Chile's debut season in the NSL was unfortunately plagued with many controversies as many of their matches were disrupted because of fan violence, and disruptive behavior from the players. One notable incident occurred during an NSL Cup match against Windsor Wheels where the match was abandoned after a fan invasion which resulted in a brawl. It was later reported that Chile Lindo received a league record fine of $5000 for previous on-field incidents, and their league representative was fined and suspended for two years for enticing their supporters to riot. In regards to the match against Windsor harsh measures were placed on Chile with four players receiving lengthy suspensions. The suspensions caused a change in the team management as head coach Rivas was suspended from the league for four years. Rivas replacement was former head coach Modesto Juárez.

Despite Chile's problems from the previous season, they returned for the 1988 season. In their second season in the NSL the club finished in seventh place. The following season Chile's franchise was revoked due to continuing behavioral problems.

== Head coach history ==
- Luis Montenegro (1981)
- Modesto Juárez (1985–1986)
- Carlos Rivas (1987)
- Modesto Juárez (1987)

== Seasons ==
Season	League	Teams	Record	Rank	Playoffs	Ref
1987	National Soccer League	11	3–9–8	8th	–	
1988	National Soccer League	10	4–3–10	7th	–	
