= 1982 National Soccer League (Canada) season =

National Soccer League
- Season: 1982
- Champions: Toronto Italia (regular season); Hamilton Steelers (playoffs, 2nd title)
- League cup: Toronto Italia
- Top goalscorer: Carlos Salguero (16)

The 1982 National Soccer League season was the fifty-ninth season under the National Soccer League (NSL) name. The season began in May 1982 and concluded in late October 1982 with the NSL Championship final, where Hamilton Steelers successfully defended their title against Toronto Italia in a two-legged series final. Toronto Italia would still achieve a double by producing an undefeated streak to claim the regular-season title and the NSL Cup by defeating St. Catharines Roma.

The season also marked the final time when the NSL would operate a franchise in the United States.

== Overview ==
As reports of a potential Canadian national soccer league were becoming more imminent as an alternative to the American-based North American Soccer League (NASL), two rival parties, the Canadian Major Soccer League (CMSL) and the Canadian Professional Soccer League (CPSL), were attempting to receive sanctioning from the Canadian Soccer Association (CSA) and were competing for national sponsorship. The CMSL attempted to recruit the Ontario-based National Soccer League (NSL) to the discussions to deploy the NSL as the league's eastern affiliate. In December, the CPSL was officially announced and set to debut for the following season with two NSL clubs, Hamilton Steelers and Toronto Croatia, under the name Mississauga Croatia, being granted franchises. The CMSL, on the other hand, received provisional sanctioning from the CSA in January 1983. After failing to secure any national sponsorship, the CMSL failed to make its debut.

The number of teams within the NSL remained the same as the previous season, except for the departure of Toronto Ukrainia. The number of teams remained as ten teams, as a new entry that represented the Latin American community in the Greater Toronto Area, known as Dinamo Latino, was granted an NSL franchise. Near the conclusion of the season, the league lost its presence in the United States when Detroit Besa withdrew from the competition. A notable friendly tournament sponsored by the Labatt Brewing Company featured European teams such as Celtic F.C. and Dinamo Zagreb against Toronto Italia and Toronto Panhellenic. Toronto Italia managed to upset Celtic with a defeat, but ultimately was defeated by Zagreb in the finals. Former league president Joe Piccininni returned to his former post, and attempts at a television deal with MTV were announced in hopes of broadcasting league matches.

=== Teams ===
Team	City	Stadium	Manager
Bradford Marshlanders	Bradford, Ontario		
Detroit Besa (Note: Detroit withdrew from league midway through the season)	Detroit, Michigan	Keyworth Stadium	
Dinamo Latino	Toronto, Ontario	Lamport Stadium	Pedro Kozak
Hamilton Steelers	Hamilton, Ontario	Brian Timmis Stadium	Kevin Grant
London City	London, Ontario	Cove Road Stadium	
St. Catharines Roma	St. Catharines, Ontario	Club Roma Stadium	
Toronto Croatia	Etobicoke, Ontario	Centennial Park Stadium	
Toronto Falcons	Toronto, Ontario	Lamport Stadium	
Toronto First Portuguese	Toronto, Ontario	Lamport Stadium	
Toronto Italia	Etobicoke, Ontario	Centennial Park Stadium	Carlo Del Monte
Toronto Panhellenic	Toronto, Ontario	Lamport Stadium	

==== Coaching changes ====
Team	Outgoing coach	Manner of departure	Date of vacancy	Position in table	Incoming coach	Date of appointment
Dinamo Latino	Artigas Cruz	resigned	July 21, 1982		(Argentina) Pedro Kozak	July 21, 1982

Location of NSL teams outside of Toronto for the 1982 NSL season.

Location of NSL teams in Toronto for the 1982 NSL season.

== Final standings ==
Pos	Team	Pld	W	D	L	GF	GA	GD	Pts	Qualification
1	Toronto Italia (C)	18	14	4	0	43	10	+33	32	Qualification for Playoffs
2	Hamilton Steelers (O)	18	9	5	4	31	21	+10	23	Qualification for Playoffs
3	St. Catharines Roma	18	9	1	8	33	33	0	19	Qualification for Playoffs
4	Toronto Panhellenic	18	8	3	7	20	22	−2	19	Qualification for Playoffs
5	London City	18	7	4	7	33	29	+4	18	Qualification for Playoffs
6	Toronto First Portuguese	18	6	5	7	28	27	+1	17	Qualification for Playoffs
7	Bradford Marshlanders	18	5	6	7	24	29	−5	16	
8	Dinamo Latino	18	4	6	8	20	23	−3	14	
9	Toronto Falcons	18	4	4	10	19	39	−20	12	
10	Toronto Croatia	18	3	4	11	15	29	−14	10	

Updated to match(es) played on September 30, 1982. Source:
Rules for classification: 1) points; 2) goal difference; 3) number of goals scored.
(C) Champions; (O) Play-off winners

== Playoffs ==
=== Finals ===
October 20, 1982	Hamilton Steelers	2–1	Toronto Italia	Hamilton, Ontario
		[ Report]		Stadium: Ivor Wynne Stadium

October 24, 1982	Toronto Italia	1–1	Hamilton Steelers	Etobicoke, Ontario
	Moniz 22'	[ Report]	Emil Rehak 58'	Stadium: Centennial Park Stadium
