= Detroit Wheels (disambiguation) =

Detroit Wheels may refer to

- Detroit Wheels, football team
- Detroit Wheels (ABA), basketball team
- Detroit Wheels (soccer), soccer team
- The Detroit Wheels, Mitch Ryder's backup band
