= 1987 National Soccer League (Canada) season =

National Soccer League
- Season: 1987
- Champions: Windsor Wheels (regular season); Toronto Italia (playoffs, 10th title)
- League cup: Toronto Italia
- Top goalscorer: Marc Tirikian (17)

The 1987 National Soccer League season was the sixty-fourth season under the National Soccer League (NSL) name. The season began in early May 1987 and concluded in early October 1987 with the NSL Championship final, where Toronto Italia defeated London Marconi. Toronto would secure a league treble by winning the NSL Ontario Cup against Windsor Wheels and claiming the NSL Canada Cup from St. Léonard-Corfinium of the Quebec National Soccer League (LNSQ). On the other hand, Windsor became the regular-season champions by finishing first in the standings. As a result, Windsor would travel to Montreal, Quebec, to face the LNSQ league champions Sherbrooke Univestrie, and would win the NSL Canadian Championship.

== Overview ==
The 1987 season marked another major change in the Canadian soccer landscape as the Canadian Soccer Association's (CSA) nationally sanctioned Canadian Soccer League (CSL) made its debut with a consequential effect on the National Soccer League (NSL). The formation of the CSL caused tension between both leagues and the national governing body. The original cause of divisiveness was based on the CSA's policy of no ethnically affiliated teams, which caused several rejections of noted NSL clubs in acquiring a franchise in the CSL. In response, the Ontario-centered NSL began competing with the nascent national league by utilizing their affiliated agreements with the Pacific Rim Soccer League of British Columbia and the Quebec National Soccer League (LNSQ) for national recognition. The agreements were based on an alternative method to the CSL's method of employing an interlocking national schedule. The NSL's approach was to reduce travel expenses by providing a regionalized format where regionalized leagues with separate schedules would provide contenders to a postseason tournament, which determined the national champion.

Before the commencement of both CSL and NSL seasons, various negotiations took place with proposals to integrate or establish a promotion and relegation system within both leagues and a reasonable compromise to the ethnically supported clubs. The discussions failed to produce any results and both leagues continued working in opposition to one another with different philosophical approaches to a national league system. Internally, several changes were approved at the NSL annual general meeting, with plans of reestablishing a reserve division and intentions of creating a promotion and relegation system within the league. League commissioner Rocco Lofranco continued negotiating with various organizations in hopes of establishing further affiliated agreements in the Maritimes and the Canadian Prairies.

The membership in the league increased to eleven members, with all clubs returning except the Toronto Blizzard, which had defected to the CSL. The new entries were centered in Toronto, which included Chile Lindo, Nacional Latino, Toronto International, and the Mississauga Lakers of the Petro Canada League, receiving an NSL franchise.

=== Teams ===
Team	City	Stadium	Manager
Chile Lindo	Toronto, Ontario	Lamport Stadium	Modesto Juárez
London Marconi	London, Ontario	Cove Road Stadium	
Mississauga Lakers	Mississauga, Ontario		
Nacional Latino	Etobicoke, Ontario	Centennial Park Stadium	Luis Ridoutt
St. Catharines Roma	St. Catharines, Ontario	Club Roma Stadium	Jimmy Douglas
Toronto First Portuguese	Toronto, Ontario	Lamport Stadium	
Toronto Croatia	Etobicoke, Ontario	Centennial Park Stadium	Vid Horvat
Toronto International	Etobicoke, Ontario	Centennial Park Stadium	Ted Pope
Toronto Italia	Etobicoke, Ontario	Centennial Park Stadium	Germán Sánchez
Toronto Panhellenic	Scarborough, Ontario	Birchmount Stadium	
Windsor Wheels	Windsor, Ontario	Windsor Stadium	Mirko Bazic

==== Coaching changes ====
Team	Outgoing coach	Manner of departure	Date of vacancy	Position in table	Incoming coach	Date of appointment
Chile Lindo	(Chile) Carlos Rivas	suspended	August 26, 1987	7th in August	Modesto Juárez	August 28, 1987
Nacional Latino	Luis Caruso	dismissed	July 20, 1987	11th in July	(Peru) Luis Ridoutt	July 22, 1987
Toronto Italia	(Peru) Luis Ridoutt	resigned	May 20, 1987	3rd in May	Germán Sánchez	
Toronto Croatia	(Croatia) Bruno Pilaš		August 24, 1987	2nd in August	(Croatia) Vid Horvat	

Location of NSL teams outside of Toronto for the 1987 NSL season.

Location of NSL teams in Toronto for the 1987 NSL season.

== Final standings ==
Pos	Team	Pld	W	D	L	GF	GA	GD	Pts	Qualification
1	Windsor Wheels (C)	20	13	4	3	54	18	+36	30	Qualification for Playoffs
2	Toronto Croatia	20	12	3	5	46	19	+27	27	Qualification for Playoffs
3	Toronto Panhellenic	20	12	3	5	34	24	+10	27	Qualification for Playoffs
4	London Marconi	20	9	6	5	34	23	+11	24	Qualification for Playoffs
5	Toronto Italia (O)	20	8	6	6	30	28	+2	22	Qualification for Playoffs
6	Toronto International	20	7	5	8	29	21	+8	19	
7	Mississauga Lakers	20	4	7	9	23	25	−2	15	
8	Chile Lindo	20	3	9	8	18	44	−26	15	
9	St. Catharines Roma	20	3	9	8	18	30	−12	15	
10	Toronto First Portuguese	20	5	5	10	21	39	−18	15	
11	Nacional Latino	20	4	4	12	44	12	+32	12	

Updated to match(es) played on September 17, 1987. Source:
Rules for classification: 1) points; 2) goal difference; 3) number of goals scored.
(C) Champions; (O) Play-off winners

== Cup ==
The cup tournament was a separate contest from the rest of the season, in which all eleven teams took part. All the matches were separate from the regular season, and the teams were grouped into two separate divisions. The two winners in the group stage would advance to a singles match for the Cup. The winner of the league cup would face the Quebec National Soccer League (LNSQ) cup titleholder for the NSL Canada Cup.

=== Finals ===
September 20, 1987	Toronto Italia	1–0	Windsor Wheels	Etobicoke, Ontario
20:00	Hardley Scott 81'	[ Report]		Stadium: Centennial Park Stadium

September 24, 1987	Windsor Wheels	3–4	Toronto Italia	Windsor, Ontario
20:00	Franjo Domic, Paul Pecoraro	[ Report]	Hardley Scott, Carmine Groe; Salguero	Stadium: Windsor Stadium; Attendance: 750

== NSL Canadian Championship ==
Since the 1986 season, a joint effort was conducted between the Pacific Rim Soccer League of British Columbia, the National Soccer League, and the Quebec National Soccer League to provide a national champion. Their regional champions would face each other in a singles match for the championship. The Pacific Rim Soccer League participated in the first tournament but ceased operations in 1987. While their league cup champions would compete for the NSL Canada Cup.

=== NSL Canadian Championship ===
October 5, 1987	Université de Sherbrooke	0–1	Windsor Wheels	Sherbrooke, Quebec
15:00		Report	Marc Tirikian 47'	Stadium: Université de Sherbrooke Stadium

=== NSL Canada Cup ===
September 26, 1987	Toronto Italia	3–0	St. Leonard-Corfinium	Etobicoke, Ontario
	Salguero 4', 85'; Hardley Scott 82'	Report		Stadium: Centennial Park Stadium
