= Liotti =

Liotti is a surname. Notable people with the surname include:

- Daniele Liotti (born 1971), Italian actor
- Daniele Liotti (born 1994), Italian footballer
- Louis Liotti (born 1985), American ice hockey player

== See also ==
- Piotti
