= Marco Abascal =

Chilean footballer (born 1960)

Personal information
- Full name: Marco Antonio Abascal Barria
- Date of birth: 15 February 1960 (age 66)
- Place of birth: Santiago, Chile
- Height: 5 ft 6 in (1.68 m)
- Position: Forward

Youth career
- Everton de Viña del Mar
- Club Uruguay Toronto

Senior career*
| Years | Team | Apps | (Gls) |
| 1980 | Toronto Panhellenic | | |
- Cruz Azul
- Morelia
| 1981–1982 | Kansas City Comets (indoor) | 6 | (1) |
| 1982 | Nacional Latino | | |
| 1983 | Hamilton Steelers | | |
| 1984–1985 | Nacional Latino | | |
| 1986 | Toronto Blizzard | | |
| 1987 | Toronto Blizzard | 11 | (1) |
| 1988–1989 | Everton de Viña del Mar | | |
| 1990 | Coquimbo Unido | | |
| 1991–1992 | Toronto Blizzard | 29 | (9) |
| 1993 | Unión San Felipe | | |
- * Club domestic league appearances and goals

Marco Antonio Abascal Barria (born 15 February 1960) is a Chilean former professional footballer who played as a forward.

== Early life ==
Abascal began playing football in Viña del Mar in Chile, eventually joining the youth side of Chilean club Everton de Viña del Mar. He later moved to Canada and began playing for Club Uruguay Toronto, winning the Toronto & District Soccer League championship in 1979.

== Career ==
In 1980, Abascal began his professional career with Toronto Panhellenic in the Canadian National Soccer League, where they won the league playoff championship that season. He then had short spells in Mexico with Cruz Azul and Morelia.

In 1981, he joined the Kansas City Comets of the Major Indoor Soccer League, initially being cut in preseason, before rejoining the team that season. He scored his first and only goal for the Comets on November 29 against the Wichita Wings, scoring the winning goal in overtime.

In 1982, he returned to the NSL with Nacional Latino. In 1983, he joined the Hamilton Steelers of the Canadian Professional Soccer League. Afterwards, he returned to Dinamo Latino, finishing as leading goalscorer in the 1985 season. In 1985, he attended preseason with MISL club Chicago Sting. In 1986, Dinamo was purchased and became the Toronto Blizzard, with whom he won the 1986 NSL title. In 1987, the Blizzard moved to the Canadian Soccer League, where he played the 1987 season, scoring once in 11 appearances.

He then returned to Chile, spending time with Everton de Viña del Mar and Coquimbo Unido, before returning to the Blizzard in 1991. In 1993, he again returned to Chile and joined Unión San Felipe.
