= 2014 Challenge Trophy =

2014 Canada Soccer National Championships
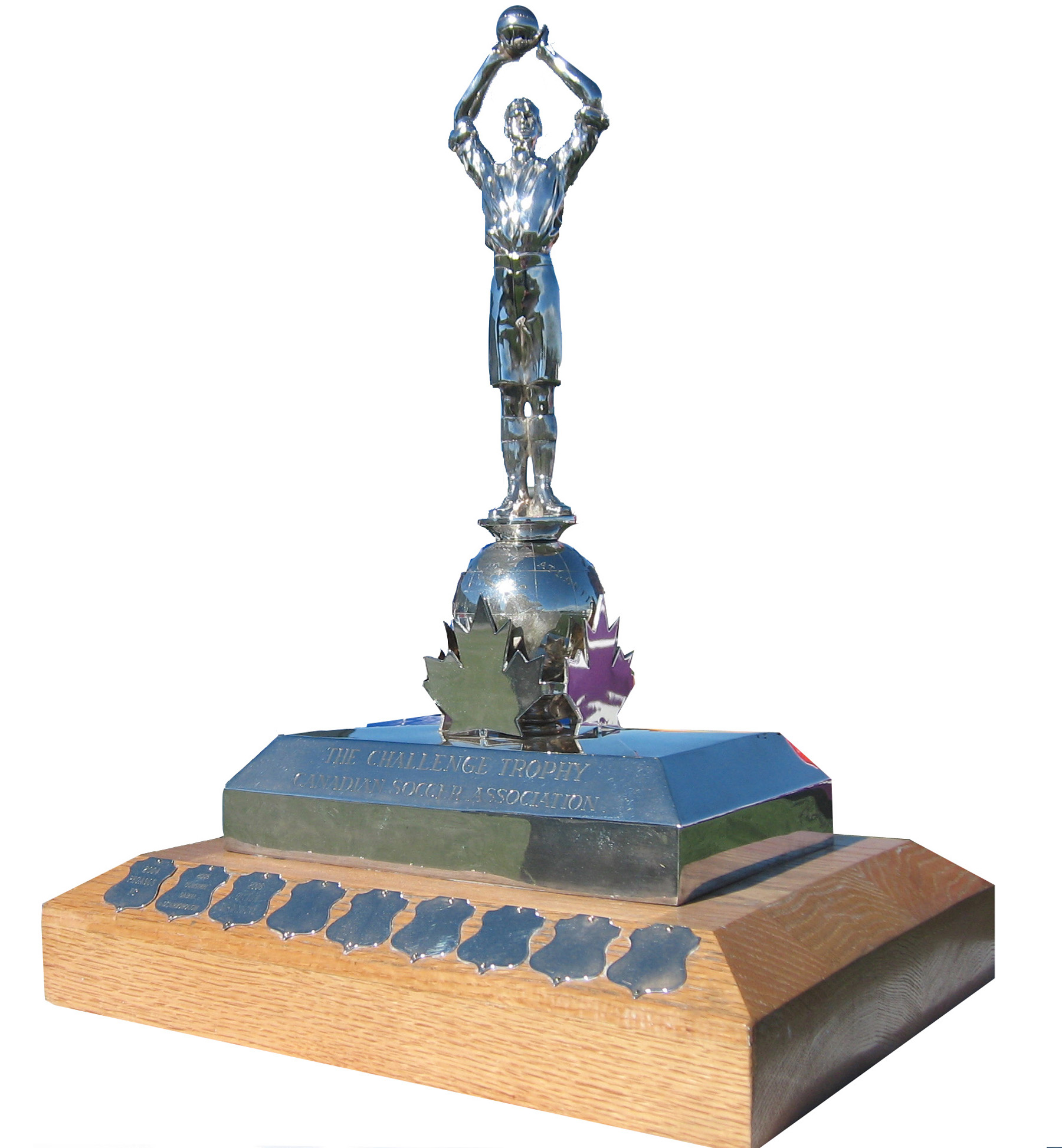
- The Challenge Trophy

Tournament details
- Country: Canada

Final positions
- Champions: London Marconi (1st title)
- Runners-up: Calgary Callies

Awards
- Best player: MVP Denver Spearman

The 2014 Canada Soccer National Championships (officially the Sport Chek National Championships for sponsorship reasons) was the 92nd staging of Canada Soccer's amateur football club competition. London Marconi won the Challenge Trophy after they beat Calgary Callies in the Canadian Final at the Ontario Soccer Centre in Vaughan on 13 October 2014.

Twelve teams qualified to the final week of the 2014 National Championships in Vaughan. In the Semifinals, London Marconi beat FC Winnipeg Lions while Calgary Callies beat Saskatoon HUSA Alumni.

On the road to the National Championships, London Marconi beat Vaughan Azzurri in the 2014 Ontario Cup Final.

== Teams ==
- (British Columbia) Croatia SC
- (Alberta) Calgary Callies
- (Saskatchewan) Saskatoon HUSA Alumni
- (Manitoba) FC Winnipeg Lions
- (Ontario) London Marconi
- (Ontario) Vaughan Azzurri
- (Quebec) Royal Sélect de Beauport
- (New Brunswick) Fredericton Picaroons
- (Nova Scotia) Dartmouth United Golden Goal
- (Prince Edward Island) P.E.I. FC
- (Newfoundland and Labrador) Holy Cross
- (Northwest Territories) Yellowknife FC

== Group stage ==
=== Group A ===
Pos	Team	Pld	W	D	L	GF	GA	GD	Pts
1	London Marconi	2	1	1	0	3	1	+2	4
2	Vaughan Azzurri	2	0	2	0	1	1	0	2
3	P.E.I. FC	2	0	1	1	2	4	−2	1

Standings source:

=== Group B ===
Pos	Team	Pld	W	D	L	GF	GA	GD	Pts
1	Croatia SC	2	1	0	1	4	1	+3	3
2	Fredericton Picaroons	2	1	0	1	1	1	0	3
3	Dartmouth United Golden Goal	2	1	0	1	1	4	−3	3

=== Group C ===
Pos	Team	Pld	W	D	L	GF	GA	GD	Pts
1	Calgary Callies	2	1	1	0	8	1	+7	4
2	FC Winnipeg Lions	2	1	1	0	2	1	+1	4
3	Yellowknife FC	2	0	0	2	2	10	−8	0

=== Group D ===
Pos	Team	Pld	W	D	L	GF	GA	GD	Pts
1	Saskatoon HUSA Alumni	2	2	0	0	3	0	+3	6
2	Holy Cross	2	1	0	1	1	2	−1	3
3	Royal Sélect de Beauport	2	0	0	2	0	2	−2	0

== Relegation tournament ==
Last placed teams from the group stage were entered into a relegation round-robin tournament to determine overall classifications for 9th through 12th place.

Pos	Team	Pld	W	D	L	GF	GA	GD	Pts
9	P.E.I. FC	3	3	0	0	13	2	+11	9
10	Royal Sélect de Beauport	3	2	0	1	14	6	+8	6
11	Dartmouth United Golden Goal	3	1	0	2	7	6	+1	3
12	Yellowknife FC	3	0	0	3	3	23	−20	0

== Knockout round ==
The top two teams from each group in the group stage advanced to the knockout round. All teams played three matches, as teams that lost in the knockout round still advanced to face other losing teams to determine final classifications for 3rd through 8th place.

=== Quarter finals ===
October 11, 2014
10:30am

Croatia SC	0 - 3	Calgary Callies

Soccer Centre
October 11, 2014
11:00am

FC Winnipeg Lions	2 - 1	Fredericton Picaroons

Sonoma
October 11, 2014
3:00pm

London Marconi	2 - 2	Holy Cross
Penalties
	6 - 5

Soccer Centre
October 11, 2014
3:30pm

Saskatoon HUSA Alumni	3 - 3	Vaughan Azzurri
Penalties
	5 - 4

Sonoma

=== Semifinals ===
October 12, 2014
10:00am
Winner to 1st place match

London Marconi	1 - 0	FC Winnipeg Lions

Soccer Centre
October 12, 2014
12:30pm
Winner to 1st place match

Saskatoon HUSA Alumni	0 - 0	Calgary Callies
Penalties
	2 - 4

Soccer Centre

October 12, 2014
1:00pm
Winner to 5th place match

Holy Cross	2 - 0	Fredericton Picaroons

Vaughan Grove
October 12, 2014
1:30pm
Winner to 5th place match

Vaughan Azzurri	0 - 4	Croatia SC

Sonoma

=== Finals ===
October 13, 2014
12:00pm
1st place match

London Marconi	0 - 0	Calgary Callies
Penalties
	4 - 2

Soccer Centre

October 13, 2014
11:00am
3rd place match

FC Winnipeg Lions	0 - 0	Saskatoon HUSA Alumni
Penalties
	0 - 3

Vaughan Grove

October 13, 2014
10:30am
5th place match

Holy Cross	4 - 4	Croatia SC
Penalties
	4 - 3

Hershey 1

October 13, 2014
8:00am
7th place match

Fredericton Picaroons	3 - 0	Vaughan Azzurri

Hershey 2

== Winning team roster ==
=== London Marconi ===
Note: Flags indicate national team as defined under FIFA eligibility rules; some limited exceptions apply. Players may hold more than one non-FIFA nationality.

No.	Pos.	Nation	Player
6			Aaron Schneebeli
12			Ahmad Birani
4			Alex Lewis
3			Brandon Mendes
17			Brian Pistor
4			Connor McFall
13			Denver Spearman
18			Geert Remjin
15			Jovan Ivanovich
1	GK		Mark Haynes

No.	Pos.	Nation	Player
22			Matt Catalano
23			Matt Cuthbert
10			Mike Marcoccia
16			Parker Seymour
11			Paul Aronold
2			Ryan Avola
7			Steven Hepton
9			Taso Bujouves
5			Tyler Hemming

== Final standings ==
Rank	Team
1st place, gold medalist(s)	(Ontario) London Marconi
2nd place, silver medalist(s)	(Alberta) Calgary Callies
3rd place, bronze medalist(s)	(Saskatchewan) Saskatoon HUSA Alumni
4	(Manitoba) FC Winnipeg Lions
5	(Newfoundland and Labrador) Holy Cross
6	(British Columbia) Croatia SC
7	(New Brunswick) Fredericton Picaroons
8	(Ontario) Vaughan Azzurri
9	(Prince Edward Island) P.E.I. FC
10	(Quebec) Royal Sélect de Beauport
11	(Nova Scotia) Dartmouth United Golden Goal
12	(Northwest Territories) Yellowknife FC
