= Gus Moffat =

Scottish footballer

Personal information
- Full name: Thomas Angus Moffat
- Date of birth: 15 May 1948
- Place of birth: Lanarkshire, Scotland
- Date of death: 11 February 2015 (aged 66)
- Place of death: Windsor, Ontario, Canada
- Height: 5 ft 7 in (1.70 m)
- Position: Right winger

Senior career*
Years	Team	Apps	(Gls)
1964–1965	Southampton	0	(0)
1965–1968	Motherwell	41	(6)
1968	Detroit Cougars	10	(0)
1968–1969	Falkirk	1	(0)
1969–1970	Dumbarton	4	(2)
1971–1972	Toronto Metros	38	(2)
1976–1977	Windsor Stars		
1978–1980	Detroit Express	69	(3)
1979–1980	→ Detroit Express (indoor)	9	(2)
1981	Washington Diplomats	3	(0)
1982–1983	Detroit Express		
Total		175	(15)

Managerial career
- 1985–1986: Windsor Wheels
- * Club domestic league appearances and goals

Thomas Angus Moffat (15 May 1948 – 11 February 2015) was a Scottish professional footballer who played as a right winger. Active in England, Scotland, the United States and Canada between 1964 and 1983, Moffat made nearly 200 career league appearances.

== Playing career ==
Born in Lanarkshire, Scotland, Moffat played in the United Kingdom for Southampton, Motherwell, Falkirk and Dumbarton.

He joined Southampton as an amateur in May 1964. While playing for Motherwell he was the first player in Scottish football to score a goal after coming on as a substitute.

He also played in the North American Soccer League for the Detroit Cougars, the Toronto Metros, the Detroit Express and the Washington Diplomats, and in the American Soccer League for the Detroit Express. In 1976, he played in Canada in the National Soccer League with Windsor Stars for two seasons.

== Later career ==
After retiring as a player, Moffatt settled in Windsor, Ontario with his family.

In the 1980s, Moffatt coached AC Roma, an amateur team in Windsor, Ontario. In 1985, he was the head coach for the Windsor Wheels in the National Soccer League. In his debut season he led Windsor to the NSL Championship final, but were defeated by Toronto Italia. He returned to coach Windsor for the 1986 season. In August 1986, Windsor dismissed him from his position. In 1989, Moffatt, along with Brian Tinnion, founded the Detroit Rockers. He died in Canada on 11 February 2015.
