= 2015 Challenge Trophy =

2015 Canada Soccer National Championships
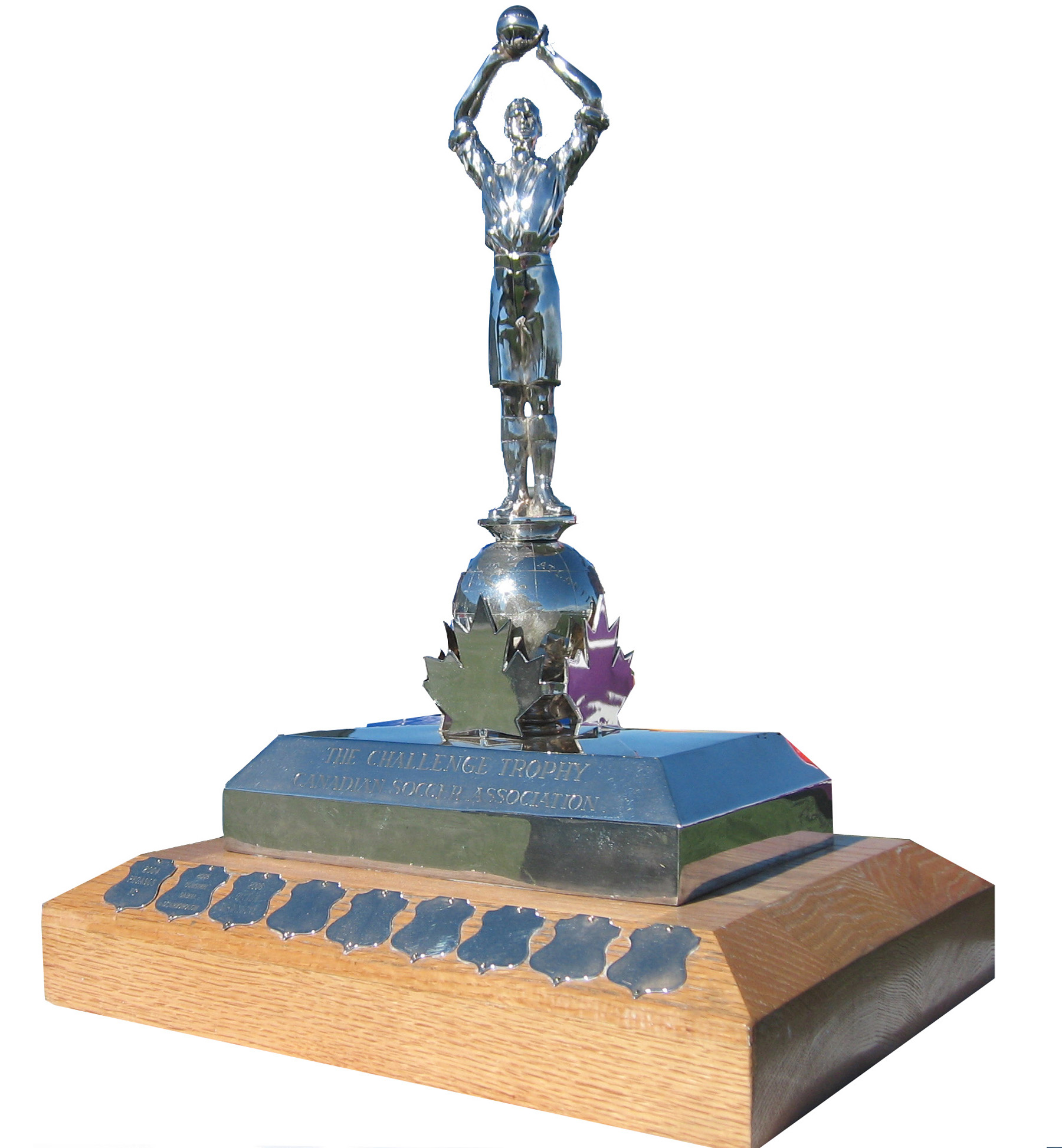
- The Challenge Trophy

Tournament details
- Country: Canada

Final positions
- Champions: London Marconi (2nd title)
- Runners-up: Edmonton Scottish

Awards
- Best player: MVP Jovan Ivanovich

The 2015 Canada Soccer National Championships (officially the Sport Chek National Championships for sponsorship reasons) was the 93rd staging of Canada Soccer's amateur football club competition. London Marconi won the Challenge Trophy after they beat Edmonton Scottish in the Canadian Final at the Calgary Soccer Centre in Calgary on 12 October 2015.

Twelve teams qualified to the final week of the 2015 National Championships in Calgary. In the Semifinals, London Marconi beat EDC FC Burnaby while Edmonton Scottish beat Edmonton Green & Gold.

On the road to the National Championships, London Marconi beat Mississauga Portofino in the 2015 Ontario Cup Final.

== Teams ==
Twelve teams were granted entry into the competition; one from each Canadian province, as well as one from the Northwest Territories. In addition, as the host province, Alberta is granted a second entry into the competition.

Teams are selected by their provincial soccer associations; most often qualifying by winning provincial leagues or cup championships such as the Ontario Cup.

Province	Team	Qualification
British Columbia	Estrella de Chile Burnaby	British Columbia Men's Provincial Cup
Alberta	Edmonton Scottish	Alberta Major Soccer League
Alberta	Edmonton Green & Gold	Alberta Major Soccer League
Saskatchewan	HUSA Alumni Saskatoon	Saskatchewan Open Cup
Manitoba	Winnipeg Juventus	Manitoba Soccer Association Cup
Ontario	London Marconi	Ontario Cup
Quebec	Rapides de Chaudière-Ouest	Ligue de soccer élite du Québec Champion
New Brunswick	Fredericton Picaroons	New Brunswick Premier Soccer League
Nova Scotia	Dartmouth United Soccer Club	Nova Scotia Soccer League
Prince Edward Island	P.E.I. FC	Acclaimed
Newfoundland and Labrador	Holy Cross	Newfoundland and Labrador Challenge Cup
Northwest Territories	Yellowknife FC	Acclaimed

== Group stage ==
The twelve teams in the competition are divided into four groups of three teams each, which then play a single-game round-robin format. The top two teams from each group advance to the knockout round, while the third-placed team enters a relegation tournament.

=== Group A ===
Pos	Team	Pld	W	D	L	GF	GA	GD	Pts	Qualification	Ontario	Quebec	Prince Edward Island
1	(Ontario) London Marconi	2	2	0	0	3	0	+3	6	Advance to knockout round	—	1–0	2–0
2	(Quebec) Rapides de Chaudière-Ouest	2	1	0	1	5	1	+4	3	Advance to knockout round	—	—	—
3	(Prince Edward Island) P.E.I. FC	2	0	0	2	0	7	−7	0	Classification tournament	—	0–5	—

Source: canadasoccer.com

=== Group B ===
Pos	Team	Pld	W	D	L	GF	GA	GD	Pts	Qualification	Alberta	New Brunswick	Nova Scotia
1	(Alberta) Edmonton Scottish	2	1	1	0	3	1	+2	4	Advance to knockout round	—	2–0	1–1
2	(New Brunswick) Fredericton Picaroons	2	1	0	1	2	3	−1	3	Advance to knockout round	—	—	2–1
3	(Nova Scotia) Dartmouth United SC	2	0	1	1	2	3	−1	1	Classification tournament	—	—	—

Source: canadasoccer.com

=== Group C ===
Pos	Team	Pld	W	D	L	GF	GA	GD	Pts	Qualification	British Columbia	Saskatchewan	Northwest Territories
1	(British Columbia) EDC Burnaby	2	2	0	0	7	3	+4	6	Advance to knockout round	—	—	4–1
2	(Saskatchewan) HUSA Alumni Saskatoon	2	1	0	1	7	3	+4	3	Advance to knockout round	2–3	—	5–0
3	(Northwest Territories) Yellowknife FC	2	0	0	2	1	9	−8	0	Classification tournament	—	—	—

Source: canadasoccer.com

=== Group D ===
Pos	Team	Pld	W	D	L	GF	GA	GD	Pts	Qualification	Alberta	Newfoundland and Labrador	Manitoba
1	(Alberta) Edmonton Green & Gold	2	2	0	0	5	0	+5	6	Advance to knockout round	—	—	—
2	(Newfoundland and Labrador) Holy Cross	2	0	1	1	1	2	−1	1	Advance to knockout round	0–1	—	—
3	(Manitoba) Winnipeg Juventus	2	0	1	1	1	5	−4	1	Classification tournament	0–4	1–1	—

Source: canadasoccer.com

== Classification tournament ==
Third-placed teams from the group stage are entered into the classification tournament to determine overall rankings at the end of the tournament.

Pos	Team	Pld	W	D	L	GF	GA	GD	Pts	Prince Edward Island	Manitoba	Nova Scotia	Northwest Territories
1	(Prince Edward Island) P.E.I. FC	3	3	0	0	17	2	+15	9	—	6–0	6–2	5–0
2	(Manitoba) Winnipeg Juventus	3	2	0	1	5	7	−2	6		—		
3	(Nova Scotia) Dartmouth United SC	3	1	0	2	11	9	+2	3		1–2	—	8–1
4	(Northwest Territories) Yellowknife FC	3	0	0	3	1	16	−15	0		0–3		—

Source: canadasoccer.com

== Knockout Round ==
Teams placed first and second from each group in the group stage advance to the knockout round. All teams play three matches, as teams that lose in the knockout round still advance to face other losing teams to determine final classifications for 3rd through 8th place.

Fifth place
2D	Holy Cross	1
2C	HUSA Alumni Saskatoon	2
Seventh place
2B	Fredericton Picaroons	0
2A	Rapides de Chaudière-Ouest	1

Consolation playoffs
2D	Holy Cross	4
2B	Fredericton Picaroons	2
2A	Rapides de Chaudière-Ouest	0
2C	HUSA Alumni Saskatoon	3

Quarterfinals
1A	London Marconi	2
2D	Holy Cross	0
1C	EDC Burnaby	2
2B	Fredericton Picaroons	1
1D	Edmonton Green & Gold	4
2A	Rapides de Chaudière-Ouest	0
1B	Edmonton Scottish (pen.)	1 (3)
2C	HUSA Alumni Saskatoon	1 (2)

Semifinals
1A	London Marconi	2
1C	EDC Burnaby	0
1D	Edmonton Green & Gold	1
1B	Edmonton Scottish	2

Final
1A	London Marconi (aet)	2
1D	Edmonton Scottish	1
Third place
1C	EDC Burnaby	2
1B	Edmonton Green & Gold	1

=== Quarterfinals ===
October 10, 2015 Quarterfinal	London Marconi (Ontario)	2 - 0	(Newfoundland and Labrador) Holy Cross	Calgary, Alberta
11:00 am	Perez; Ramjin	Report		Stadium: Calgary Soccer Centre AT2

October 10, 2015 Quarterfinal	EDC Burnaby (British Columbia)	2 - 1	(New Brunswick) Fredericton Picaroons	Calgary, Alberta
3:00 pm	Tchoumi; Ellis	Report	Law	Stadium: Calgary Soccer Centre AT2

October 10, 2015 Quarterfinal	Edmonton Green & Gold (Alberta)	4 - 0	(Quebec) Rapides de Chaudière-Ouest	Calgary, Alberta
1:00 pm	Teliani; Broda; Cabrera	Report		Stadium: Calgary Soccer Centre AT2

October 10, 2015 Quarterfinal	Edmonton Scottish (Alberta)	1 - 1 (3 - 2 p)	(Saskatchewan) HUSA Alumni Saskatoon	Calgary, Alberta
3:00 pm	Johnstone	Report	Friesen	Stadium: Calgary Soccer Centre AT2

=== Semifinals ===
October 11, 2015 Semifinal	London Marconi (Ontario)	2 - 0	(British Columbia) EDC Burnaby	Calgary, Alberta
12:00 pm	Spearman; Lewis	Report		Stadium: Calgary Soccer Centre AT2

October 11, 2015 Semifinal	Edmonton Green & Gold (Alberta)	1 - 2	(Alberta) Edmonton Scottish	Calgary, Alberta
2:00 pm	Gilroy	Report	Ongaro; Johnstone	Stadium: Calgary Soccer Centre AT2

October 11, 2015 Consolation playoff	Holy Cross (Newfoundland and Labrador)	4 - 2	(New Brunswick) Fredericton Picaroons	Calgary, Alberta
11:00 am	Pope; Williams; Kirby	Report	Karosan; Crossland	Stadium: Calgary Soccer Centre AT3

October 11, 2015 Consolation playoff	Rapides de Chaudière-Ouest (Quebec)	0 - 3	(Saskatchewan) HUSA Alumni Saskatoon	Calgary, Alberta
1:00 pm		Report	Tomchuk; Reis; Myrah	Stadium: Calgary Soccer Centre AT3

=== Final ===
October 12, 2015 (gold) 1st place match	London Marconi (Ontario)	2 - 1 (a.e.t.)	(Alberta) Edmonton Scottish	Calgary, Alberta
1:00 pm	Ivanovich 18', 115' (pen.)		Lam 82' (pen.)	Stadium: Calgary Soccer Centre AT2

October 12, 2015 (bronze) 3rd place match	EDC Burnaby (British Columbia)	2 - 1	(Alberta) Edmonton Green & Gold	Calgary, Alberta
12:00 pm	Hardy; Yassin	Report	Cabrera	Stadium: Calgary Soccer Centre AT4

October 12, 2015 5th place match	Holy Cross (Newfoundland and Labrador)	1 - 2	(Saskatchewan) HUSA Alumni Saskatoon	Calgary, Alberta
10:00 am		Report		Stadium: Calgary Soccer Centre AT3

October 12, 2015 7th place match	Fredericton Picaroons (New Brunswick)	0 - 1	(Quebec) Rapides de Chaudière-Ouest	Calgary, Alberta
10:00 am		Report	Tremblay	Stadium: Calgary Soccer Centre AT4

== Tournament ranking ==
Rank	Team
1st place, gold medalist(s)	(Ontario) London Marconi
2nd place, silver medalist(s)	(Alberta) Edmonton Scottish
3rd place, bronze medalist(s)	(British Columbia) EDC Burnaby
4	(Alberta) Edmonton Green & Gold
5	(Saskatchewan) HUSA Alumni Saskatoon
6	(Newfoundland and Labrador) Holy Cross
7	(Quebec) Rapides de Chaudière-Ouest
8	(New Brunswick) Fredericton Picaroons
9	(Prince Edward Island) P.E.I. FC
10	(Manitoba) Winnipeg Juventus
11	(Nova Scotia) Dartmouth United SC
12	(Northwest Territories) Yellowknife FC
