= Piotti =

Piotti is an Italian surname. Notable people with the surname include:

- Jorge Piotti (born 1940), Argentine footballer and manager
- Luigi Piotti (1913–1971), Italian racing driver
- Ottorino Piotti (born 1954), Italian footballer
