= Mark Christensen (soccer) =

American soccer player

Personal information
- Date of birth: 12 August 1957 (age 69)
- Place of birth: Detroit, United States
- Position: Defender

Senior career*
| Years | Team | Apps | (Gls) |
| 1981–1982 | Chicago Sting | 9 | (0) |
| 1983 | Detroit Express | 28 | (0) |
| 1983–1984 | Buffalo Stallions (indoor) | 45 | (1) |
| 1984–1985 | Fort Lauderdale Sun | 30 | (12) |
| 1985–1986 | Kalamazoo Kangaroos (indoor) | 30 | (6) |
| 1986–1987 | Toledo Pride (indoor) | 41 | (4) |
| 1988–1989 | Windsor Wheels | | |
| 1988–1989 | Dayton Dynamo (indoor) | 39 | (5) |
| 1988–1989 | Memphis Rogues (indoor) | 29 | (4) |
| 1989–1990 | Dayton Dynamo (indoor) | 4 | (0) |
| 1991–1992 | Illinois Thunder (indoor) | 15 | (2) |

Managerial career
- 1994: Detroit Wheels
- * Club domestic league appearances and goals

Mark Christensen (born August 12, 1957) is an American former soccer player who played as a defender.

== Career ==
Christensen played college soccer with Oakland University, and was drafted by Carolina Lightnin' in the American Soccer League. He played in the North American Soccer League in 1981 with Chicago Sting. In 1983, he played in the American Soccer League with Detroit Express. In the winter of 1983 he indoor soccer in the Major Indoor Soccer League with the Buffalo Stallions. In 1984, he played in the United Soccer League with Fort Lauderdale Sun for two seasons.

He returned to indoor soccer format in 1985 with the Kalamazoo Kangaroos in the American Indoor Soccer Association. The following season he played with Toledo Pride, and served as the team captain. In the summer of 1988 he played abroad in the National Soccer League with Windsor Wheels. He resumed his indoor soccer career in the winter of 1988 as he signed with Dayton Dynamo. In 1989, he was traded to Memphis Rogues in a four player trade deal. In 1991, he played in the National Professional Soccer League with Illinois Thunder.

== Managerial career ==
Christensen was named the head coach for the Detroit Wheels in the United States Interregional Soccer League in 1994.
