= João Moniz =

Portuguese footballer (born 1953)

Personal information
- Full name: João Manuel Soares Moniz
- Date of birth: 7 April 1953 (age 73)
- Place of birth: Portugal
- Position: Striker

Youth career
- 1969–1970: Lusitânia
- 1970–1972: Sporting

Senior career*
Years	Team	Apps	(Gls)
1972–1973	Sporting	2	(0)
1974–1975	Atlético CP	19	(7)
1975–1976	Pombal		
1976–1980	Toronto First Portuguese		
1981–1984	Toronto Italia		
1987	Toronto First Portuguese		
- * Club domestic league appearances and goals

João Manuel Soares Moniz (born 7 April 1953) is a Portuguese former professional footballer who played as a forward.

== Career ==
Moniz began playing at the youth level in 1969 with S.C. Lusitânia, and the following season he joined Sporting CP. In 1972, he played with Lisboa's senior team in the Primeira Divisão. After two seasons with Sporting Lisboa he signed with Atlético CP. In 1975, he played in the Terceira Divisão with Sporting Clube Pombal for a season.

In 1976, he played abroad in the National Soccer League with Toronto First Portuguese. In 1979, he assisted First Portuguese in producing a perfect season. He played his final year with Toronto First Portuguese for the 1980 season. He played in the 1980 CNSL All-Star match where he recorded a goal.

Moniz would sign with league rivals Toronto Italia for the 1981 season. In 1982 he featured in the NSL Championship final against Hamilton Steelers. The following season he assisted Italia in securing the NSL Championship by contributing a goal against Dinamo Latino. He returned to Toronto First Portuguese for the 1987 season.

Moniz began volunteering with the Grand Bank-Fortune Soccer Association's club, Grand Bank Gee Bees F.C. in 2022. He serves as committee member and technical director for the Grand Bank, NL club.
