= London Marconi =

Canadian soccer team

- Full name: London Marconi Soccer Club
- Founded: 1962 (as London Italia Marconi)
- Stadium: London Marconi Soccer Field; London, Ontario
- League: Western Ontario Soccer League

London Marconi Soccer Club is a Canadian soccer club based in London, Ontario, that plays in the Western Ontario Soccer League. The club was founded in 1962 and originally competed in the London and District League. After several notable achievements at the amateur level, the organization joined the National Soccer League (NSL) in 1984. After competing in the NSL for five seasons they returned to the amateur level by joining the Western Ontario Soccer League.

The club has won the national Challenge Trophy twice in 2014, and 2015, and the Ontario Cup four times in 1966, 1978, 2014, and 2015. In 1985, the club was the National Soccer League's regular season champion.

== History ==
The club was formed in 1962 between a merger with Italo Canadian and Juventus and became known as London Italia Marconi. The parent company of London Marconi was the Marconi Club of London which originally was formed as a social club for the Italian Canadian community in London, Ontario. The club would ordinally play in the London and District League, and in 1965 reached the finals of the Ontario Cup, but were defeated by Oshawa Italia. The following season the western Ontario club was once more finalists in the Ontario Cup tournament as the Oshawa Thistles originally defeated Marconi in a series of matches, but Oshawa was revoked of the title for using several illegal players and as a result, the title was given to London. In 1978, London secured their second Ontario Cup by defeating Thorold City.

Throughout the 1980s the parent company constructed a soccer field known as the London Marconi Soccer Field for its soccer programs. In 1984, the club entered the professional ranks by becoming a member of the National Soccer League (NSL). London's most notable season in the NSL was in the 1985 season when the club secured the regular season championship. In the postseason for the NSL Championship London was eliminated in the second round to Windsor Roma. The following season Marconi reached the NSL league cup final but was defeated in a series of matches by Toronto Blizzard. In the 1987 season, London faced Toronto Italia for the NSL Championship but failed in defeating the Toronto side. As a result of the early success the club experienced in the NSL, the club ownership contemplated the idea of potentially securing a franchise in the Canadian Soccer League. Though the proposal was ultimately fruitless, London took a sabbatical for the 1989 season, eventually selling their franchise rights to former NSL member London City in 1990.

London Marconi returned to the amateur level and after 36 years Marconi secured their third Ontario Cup in 2014 after defeating Vaughan Azzurri. The Ontario Cup victory qualified London for the 2014 Challenge Trophy, and under head coach Tyler Hemming the club secured their first national title after defeating Calgary Callies. The club repeated their success the following season by successfully defending both titles against Mississauga Portofino and Edmonton Scottish. Since they departed from the NSL the club has primarily competed in the Western Ontario Soccer League where they have won several titles throughout their tenure in the league.

== Head coach history ==
- Charlie Spence (1985)
- Bill Gillis (1988)
- Tyler Hemming (2014–2015)

== Honours ==
- Challenge Trophy: 2014, 2015
- Ontario Cup: 1966, 1978, 2014, 2015
- National Soccer League Regular Season Championship: 1985
- Western Ontario Soccer League: 2015, 2016, 2017
