= Pedro Kozak =

Argentine footballer (1949–2020)

Personal information
- Date of birth: 11 January 1949
- Place of birth: Argentina
- Date of death: 31 May 2020 (aged 71)
- Place of death: Hixson, Tennessee, United States
- Position: Midfielder

Senior career*
| Years | Team | Apps | (Gls) |
| 1972–1973 | Club Atlético Lanús | 7 | (2) |
| 1973 | Toronto Italia | | |
| 1974 | Toronto Hungaria | | |
| 1975 | Serbian White Eagles | | |
| 1976–1981 | Toronto Panhellenic | | |
| 1982 | Dinamo Latino | | |

Managerial career
- 1982: Dinamo Latino
- 1987: North York Rockets
- 1992–1993: Toronto Blizzard
- 1994–1996: Chattanooga Express
- * Club domestic league appearances and goals

Pedro Kozak (11 January 1949 – 31 May 2020) was an Argentine football player and manager who played in the Argentine Primera División and the National Soccer League.

== Club career ==
Kozak played in the Argentine Primera División with Club Atlético Lanús. In 1973, he played abroad in the National Soccer League with Toronto Italia. In 1974, he played with league rivals Toronto Hungaria, and in 1975 he signed with the Serbian White Eagles where he assisted in securing the NSL Cup. In 1976, he played with Toronto Panhellenic. In 1982, he played with NSL expansion franchise Dinamo Latino.

He died on 31 May 2020.

== Managerial career ==
In 1982, he later served as the head coach for Dinamo Latino in the National Soccer League. The following season he was the head coach for the Toronto Italia youth team. In 1985, he was the technical director for Toronto Dinamo. In 1987, he served as the head coach for the North York Rockets in the Canadian Soccer League. In November 1987, he was named the technical director for the Ontario under-14 team.

In 1990, he served as an assistant coach under Tony Taylor for the Toronto Blizzard. In 1992, he was promoted to the head coach position for the Toronto Blizzard. The following season he managed the Blizzard in the American Professional Soccer League. In 1994, he was named the head coach for Chattanooga Express in the United States Interregional Soccer League.

In 1997, he formed the Premier Soccer Academy in Chattanooga, Tennessee.
