= Jorge Piotti =

Argentine footballer and manager

Personal information
- Date of birth: 25 April 1938 (age 88)
- Place of birth: Buenos Aires, Argentina
- Position: Midfielder

Senior career*
Years	Team	Apps	(Gls)
1956–1959	Club Atlético Platense	79	(25)
1964–1966	Toronto Italia		
1966–1967	Boston Tigers		
1967	Toronto Roma		
1968	Los Angeles Wolves	22	(3)
1969	Rochester Lancers		
1970	Hellas		
1971	Toronto First Portuguese		
1972–1973	Toronto Italia		

Managerial career
- 1983: Dinamo Latino
- * Club domestic league appearances and goals

Jorge Piotti or Georgio Piotti (born 1940) is an Argentine football manager and former footballer who played as a midfielder.

== Career ==
Piotti played with Club Atlético Platense, and with Calcio Catania. In 1964, he played in the Eastern Canada Professional Soccer League with Toronto Italia. In his debut season with Italia he was selected for the ECPSL All-Star team. He assisted Italia by reaching the ECPSL Championship finals match, but were defeated by Toronto City. He re-signed with Toronto Italia for the 1965 season. He assisted in securing the ECPSL Championship title against Primo Hamilton FC.

After three seasons with Toronto Italia he played in the American Soccer League in 1967 with Boston Tigers. For the remainder of the 1967 season he played in the National Soccer League with Toronto Roma. In 1968, he played in the North American Soccer League with Los Angeles Wolves. In 1969, he returned to the American Soccer League to play with the Rochester Lancers.

In 1970, he returned to play in the NSL with Hellas. The Ontario Football Association suspend Piotti and former Italia teammate Carlos Metidieri in 1970 for appearing in a match with Hellas while under contract to the Rochester Lancers. For the 1971 NSL season he played with Toronto First Portuguese. He returned to former team Toronto Italia for the 1972 NSL season. He also played with Italia during the 1973 indoor season in the Toronto Indoor Soccer League. He re-signed with Italia for the 1973 season.

== Managerial ==
In 1983, he was named the technical director and head coach for Dinamo Latino in the National Soccer League. Piotti was the head coach for Pineto United in 1989.
