= Marinel Risnita =

Romanian footballer

Personal information
- Date of birth: 16 January 1955 (age 71)
- Place of birth: Romania
- Position: Midfielder

Senior career*
Years	Team	Apps	(Gls)
1973–1980	FC Rapid București		
1982–1986	Toronto Italia		

International career
1973–1975	Romania U21	3	(0)
- * Club domestic league appearances and goals

Marinel Risnita (born 16 January 1955) is a Romanian former footballer who played as a midfielder.

== Career ==
Risnita played in Divizia A in 1973 with FC Rapid București and would play with the team for seven seasons. In his debut season he played in 18 matches and recorded 5 goals. Throughout his tenure with Rapid București he played in the 1975–76 European Cup Winners' Cup against R.S.C. Anderlecht. In 1982, he played abroad in the National Soccer League with Toronto Italia. In his debut season in Toronto he featured in the Labatt's International tournament where he recorded a goal for Italia in a 4-1 victory over Celtic F.C. In 1985, he assisted Toronto by securing the NSL Championship title where he contributed a goal.

== International career ==
Risnita played with the Romania national under-21 football team and made his debut on 25 September 1973 against East Germany.
