= Tyler Hemming =

Canadian former soccer player (born 1985)

Personal information
- Date of birth: May 9, 1985 (age 41)
- Place of birth: London, Ontario, Canada
- Height: 6 ft 0 in (1.83 m)
- Positions: Defender; defensive midfielder

Youth career
- 2003–2006: Hartwick Hawks

Senior career*
Years	Team	Apps	(Gls)
2001–2002	London City		
2005–2006	Ottawa Fury	29	(1)
2007–2008	Toronto FC	7	(0)
2008	Tampere United	4	(0)
2009	Charleston Battery	26	(0)
2010	Montreal Impact	5	(0)
2010	Austin Aztex	8	(0)
2011–2015	Forest City London	43	(2)

International career^{‡}
2004	Canada U-20	1	(0)
2008	Canada U-23	5	(0)
2009–2010	Canada	2	(0)
- * Club domestic league appearances and goals as of April 15, 2014 ‡ National team caps and goals as of January 3, 2010

Tyler Hemming (born May 9, 1985) is a Canadian former soccer player who played in the Canadian Professional Soccer League, USL Premier Development League, Major League Soccer, Veikkausliiga, USL First Division, and the USSF Division 2.

== Career ==
=== College and amateur ===
Hemming played college soccer at Hartwick College from 2003 until 2006, where he was named the Atlantic Soccer Conference Player of the Year in two consecutive years (2005 and 2006. In 2001, he signed with London City of the Canadian Professional Soccer League becoming the youngest player ever to compete in the league. During his tenure with London he was selected for the CPSL All-Star team for two straight seasons. He also played for two years with Ottawa Fury in the USL Premier Development League.

=== Professional ===
Hemming was drafted by Toronto FC as the 40th overall pick of the 2007 MLS Supplemental Draft. He played four games for Toronto in his debut season. The team's injury crisis late in the season allowed Hemming to start two matches. Hemming started at right midfield in Toronto FC's opening match of the 2008 season against Columbus, impressing in a losing effort. Although he started in the Columbus match, he did not play in the following three matches.

He was waived by Toronto FC on April 25, 2008, but rejoined the team in June due to a few unsuccessful spells trialing in Europe.

In September 2008 Hemming was offered a trial by Finnish Veikkausliiga side Tampere United. He made his first appearance for the Tampere-based club on September 13, 2008, in an away match against FC KooTeePee. After featuring in 4 matches, he suffered an injury which ruled him out for the rest of the season and the club decided not to offer him an extension to his contract.

On March 18, 2009, he signed with the Charleston Battery of the USL First Division.

On January 13, 2010, he was traded to the Montreal Impact of the USSF Division 2. In 2011, he returned to the PDL to sign with his hometown FC London. In 2012, he won the PDL Champrionship after defeating Carolina Dynamo by a score of 2–1.

=== International ===
He made his debut for the Canada men's national under-23 soccer team on March 12, 2008, against Mexico in an Olympic qualifier match. On May 30, 2009, he made his Senior team debut against Cyprus, replacing Issey Nakajima-Farran in the 68th minute.
