= Nacional Latino =

Canadian soccer team

- Full name: Nacional Latino
- Founded: 1981 (as Dinamo Latino by Enrique Artigas Cruz)
- Dissolved: 1988
- Stadium: Lamport Stadium; Toronto, Ontario
- League: National Soccer League

Nacional Latino was a soccer club based in Toronto, Ontario. The club played in the National Soccer League (NSL) in 1982, originally under the name Dinamo Latino. In 1985, the ownership of the Toronto Blizzard purchased Dinamo's franchise rights, and competed in the NSL until the 1986 season. In 1987, the Blizzard joined the Canadian Soccer League, and the previous ownership retained control of the club under the name Nacional Latino. The club's final season at the professional level lasted until the 1987 season.

The club originally played at Lamport Stadium, and later at Varsity Stadium when under the Toronto Blizzard/Dinamo name.

== History ==
In 1981, Dinamo Latino was granted a franchise in the National Soccer League and represented the Latin American community in the Greater Toronto Area. Artigas Cruz, a former professional soccer player from Uruguay, served as the inaugural head coach and was later replaced by Pedro Kozak. The club's first successful season occurred in the 1983 season, where they faced Toronto Italia for the NSL Championship, but were defeated in a series of matches. The club ownership also secured an affiliation agreement with the Toronto Nationals of the Canadian Professional Soccer League during the off-season. After the demise of the North American Soccer League (NASL) in 1984, the Toronto Blizzard joined the NSL by purchasing Dinamo Latino's franchise rights. As the transference of ownership occurred midway through the season, the team competed under the name of Toronto Dinamo as the name change required the approval of the league's board of directors.

The change in ownership caused a reshuffling in management and in talent as Toronto recruited former Blizzard head coach Dave Turner. Turner managed to sign several of the Blizzard's veterans with NASL experience, and made an immediate impact in the NSL as Dinamo secured their first piece of silverware by winning the NSL Cup. The following season, the team name was officially changed to the Toronto Blizzard, and the club became an immediate powerhouse as Toronto managed to retain many of its NASL veterans. The 1986 season produced a treble for the organization as the club clinched the regular season title and the NSL Cup. Toronto also faced Toronto Italia for the NSL Championship, but were defeated in the finals. On the national level, the Blizzard defeated Vancouver Columbus Italia for the NSL Canadian Championship, and Luso Stars Mount Royal of the Quebec National Soccer League (LNSQ) for the NSL Canada Cup.

Though the Blizzard's time in the NSL produced a successful stint, it served as a transitory period as Toronto awaited the creation of the Canadian Soccer League (CSL). The Blizzard was the only club accepted from the NSL to receive a franchise in the CSL in 1985. The club officially joined the CSL in 1987 as a charter member. After the departure of the Toronto Blizzard to the CSL the previous ownership of Dinamo Latino were granted a franchise in the NSL and operated under the name of Nacional Latino for the 1987 season. The team was originally managed by Luis Caruso, but later was replaced with Luis Ridoutt. Nacional's performance throughout the season proved to be a disappointment, and finished at the bottom of the standings. The team representatives failed to appear at a league meeting around December, 1987, and were disbanded the following year.

== Head coach history ==
- Artigas Cruz (1982)
- Pedro Kozak (1982)
- Jorge Piotti (1983)
- Luis Caruso (1985)
- Dave Turner (1985–1986)
- Luis Caruso (1987)
- Luis Riduott (1987)

== Seasons ==
Season	League	Teams	Record	Rank	Playoffs	Ref
1982	National Soccer League	10	4–6–8	8th	–	
1983	National Soccer League	8	14–6–8	3rd	Finals	
1984	National Soccer League	6	–	–	–	
1985	National Soccer League	8	–	–	–	
1986	National Soccer League	8	10–1–3	1st	Finals	
1987	National Soccer League	11	4–4–12	11th	–	
