= Dave Turner (footballer, born 1943) =

English footballer

Personal information
- Full name: David John Turner
- Date of birth: 7 September 1943 (age 83)
- Place of birth: Retford, England
- Height: 5 ft 10 in (1.78 m)
- Positions: Wing half; midfielder

Youth career
- 195?–1960: Newcastle United

Senior career*
Years	Team	Apps	(Gls)
1960–1963	Newcastle United	2	(0)
1963–1972	Brighton & Hove Albion	300	(30)
1971–1972	→ Portsmouth (loan)	0	(0)
1972–1974	Blackburn Rovers	25	(0)
Total		327	(30)

Managerial career
- 1981–1982: Toronto Blizzard
- 1985: Toronto Dinamo
- 1986–1987: Toronto Blizzard
- * Club domestic league appearances and goals

David John Turner (born 7 September 1943) is an English former professional footballer who made more than 300 appearances in the Football League playing as a wing half or midfielder for Newcastle United, Brighton & Hove Albion and Blackburn Rovers.

== Life and career ==
Turner was born in Retford, Nottinghamshire. He played schools football for his county, and joined Newcastle United straight from school. He turned professional in 1960, and was a member of the team that won the 1961–62 FA Youth Cup. He made his first-team debut on the last day of the 1961–62 Football League season, a 3–0 defeat at home to Leeds United in the Second Division, and appeared twice more before moving on to Brighton & Hove Albion in December 1963 for a £4,500 fee.

He soon established himself in the team, and settled so well that he was appointed captain during the 1966–67 season. Despite knee injuries that affected his last couple of seasons with the club, and a loan spell at Portsmouth while Brian Bromley was on loan the other way, he took his totals to 30 goals from exactly 300 appearances in the Football League, 34 from 338 in all first-team competitions. He was given a free transfer at the end of the 1971–72 season, and spent two years at Blackburn Rovers before the knee problems forced his retirement.

== Managerial career ==
Turner spent time on the coaching staff of Sheffield United and Aldershot before moving to Canada in 1979 where he coached at the Toronto Blizzard, assisting both Keith Eddy and Bobby Houghton. In 1981, he replaced Keith Eddy as the interim head coach for Toronto Blizzard. In 1985, he managed in the National Soccer League with Toronto Dinamo, and secured the NSL Cup. In 1986, he served as the head coach for Toronto Blizzard in the National Soccer League, and the following season in the Canadian Soccer League. In his debut season in the National Soccer League he achieved the double for Toronto.

In 1988, Toronto appointed him as the coaching advisor for scouting operations, and Hector Marinaro, Sr. succeed him as head coach. He returned to England 1990 and rejoined Aldershot's staff.
