= Detroit Wheels (soccer) =

American soccer team

- Founded: 1994
- Dissolved: 1996
- Ground: Wisner Stadium
- Capacity: 6,600
- Coordinates: 42.6483°N 83.3068°W
- Owner: Antonio Soave; Greg Reynolds
- Coach: Mike Francis
- League: USISL
- 1995: Midwest East - 5th

Detroit Wheels were a United States soccer team based in Detroit, Michigan, that played in the USISL for two seasons. Owned by Antonio Soave and Greg Reynolds, the team was established in 1994. At the time the ownership intended to move up to the American Professional Soccer League for the 1995 season. However, mounting debts and a smaller than expected fan base saw them remain in the USISL. Wheels played the 1994 season in Wisner Stadium and were coached first by Mark Christenson and then by Mike Francis. The team was captained by Steve Burns, the former Michigan Wolverines men's soccer team head coach. The team was replaced in the USISL in 1996 by Detroit Dynamite.

== Year-by-year ==
Year	Division	League	Reg. season	Playoffs	Open Cup
1994	3	USISL	5th, Midwest	Midweek Challenge	Did not enter
1995	3	USISL Premier League	5th, Midwest East	Did not qualify	Did not qualify
