= 2018 FC Ukraine United season =

FC Ukraine United
2018 season
- Owner: Vladimir Koval
- Head Coach: Andrei Malychenkov
- Canadian Soccer League: 1st place (First Division)
- CSL Championship: Semifinal
- Top goalscorer: Pavlo Lukyanets (12 goals)
Home colours	Away colours

The 2018 season was FC Ukraine United's third season in the Canadian Soccer League, and twelfth season since their founding in the Ontario Soccer League. The season marked United's return to the First Division after participating in the Second Division the previous year. After a competitive season with FC Vorkuta the club won their first division title on September 23, 2018. In the postseason United won their preliminary match against Brantford Galaxy, but were defeated in the second round to Scarborough SC. Pavlo Lukyanets, a veteran striker from Ukraine, was United's top goalscorer with twelve goals.

== Summary ==
After spending the 2017 season in the Second Division with a perfect season the club was promoted back into the First Division.Andrei Malychenkov resumed his coaching duties, and maintained the majority of his previous roster with additional imports from Ukraine. From the onset of the season the club remained highly competitive, and battled with rivals FC Vorkuta for supremacy of the division. Throughout the season Malychenkov achieved the necessary results in clinching the First Division title, and managed an undefeated streak of ten matches with the best offensive record. In the opening round of the playoff tournament FC Ukraine faced Brantford Galaxy, and defeated Brantford 8-7 in a penalty shootout. Their postseason campaign came to a conclusion in the second round after a 2-1 defeat to Scarborough SC.

== Team ==
=== Roster ===
As of August 18, 2018

Note: Flags indicate national team as defined under FIFA eligibility rules; some limited exceptions apply. Players may hold more than one non-FIFA nationality.

No.	Pos.	Nation	Player
1	FW		Oleksandr Popravka
2	GK	UKR	Andriy Bandrivskyy
3	DF	UKR	Ivan Kucherenko
4	DF	UKR	Maksym Rohovskyi
5	DF	UKR	Mykhailo Hurka
6	MF	UKR	Taras Hromyak
7	MF	UKR	Yuri Sokolovsky
8	MF	UKR	Sergiy Sergeyev
9	DF		Igor Bortnyk
10	FW	UKR	Pavlo Lukyanets
11	FW	UKR	Serhiy Savchenko
10	FW	UKR	Ihor Kozovyk
13	FW	UKR	Nazar Milishchuk

No.	Pos.	Nation	Player
14	FW	UKR	Ihor Shyshka
15	MF	UKR	Andriy Savchenko
16	FW	UKR	Vasyl Chornyi
17	FW		Dmytro Mykhalchuk
18	DF	UKR	Lubomir Ivansky
19	DF	UKR	Mykola Hreshta
20	FW	UKR	Vitaliy Bohdanov
21	MF	UKR	Volodymyr Romaniv
22	FW	UKR	Vadym Hetman
23	FW	UKR	Yevhen Falkovskyi
24	FW	UKR	Ihor Malysh
25	FW	UKR	Roman Datsiuk
—	MF		Amir Hosic

=== Management ===
Position	Staff
Head coach	Andrei Malychenkov
Assistant coach	Mykhailo Hurka
Goalkeeper coach	Arthur Zaslavski
Manager	Vladimir Koval
Chairman	Vladimir Koval

Last updated: August 10, 2018
Source: fcukraineunited.ca

== Canadian Soccer League ==
=== First Division ===
Pos	Team	Pld	W	D	L	GF	GA	GD	Pts	Qualification
1	FC Ukraine United (A, C)	16	12	2	2	60	16	+44	38	Qualification for Playoffs
2	FC Vorkuta (A, O)	16	12	2	2	55	16	+39	38	Qualification for Playoffs
3	SC Waterloo Region (A)	16	9	2	5	34	33	+1	29	Qualification for Playoffs
4	Scarborough SC (A)	16	8	5	3	34	20	+14	29	Qualification for Playoffs
5	Hamilton City SC (A)	16	8	1	7	41	38	+3	25	Qualification for Playoffs
6	Serbian White Eagles (A)	16	5	4	7	20	20	0	19	Qualification for Playoffs
7	SC Real Mississauga (A)	16	3	2	11	14	42	−28	11	Qualification for Playoffs
8	Brantford Galaxy (A)	16	3	2	11	9	37	−28	11	Qualification for Playoffs
9	CSC Mississauga	16	1	2	13	9	37	−28	5	

Updated to match(es) played on September 27, 2018. Source: http://canadiansoccerleague.ca/2018-csl-first-division-standings/
Rules for classification: 1) points; 2) goal difference; 3) number of goals scored.
(A) Advance to a further round; (C) Champions; (O) Play-off winners

=== Results summary ===
Overall								Home						Away					
Pld	W	D	L	GF	GA	GD	Pts	W	D	L	GF	GA	GD	W	D	L	GF	GA	GD
16	12	2	2	60	16	+44	38	5	2	1	29	8	+21	7	0	1	31	8	+23

Last updated: September 20, 2018.
Source: 2018 Canadian Soccer League season

=== Results by round ===
Round	1	2	3	4	5	6	7	8	9	10	11	12	13	14	15	16
Ground	H	H	A	A	H	A	A	A	A	H	A	H	H	A	H	H
Result	L	W	W	W	D	L	W	W	W	D	W	W	W	W	W	W

Updated to match(es) played on September 25, 2018. Source: CSL
A = Away; H = Home; W = Win; D = Draw; L = Loss

=== Matches ===
May 13	FC Ukraine United	1–2	FC Vorkuta	Toronto, Ontario
19:00	Chornyl 30'	Report	Lakusta 43'; Kerchu 77'	Stadium: Centennial Park Stadium; Referee: Milomir Tomic

May 19	FC Ukraine United	2–0	Scarborough SC	Toronto, Ontario
21:00	Amir Hosic 74'; Milishchuk 83'	Report		Stadium: Centennial Park Stadium

June 3	Scarborough SC	0–3	FC Ukraine United	Toronto, Ontario
20:00		Report	Lukyanets 64'; Malysh 74'; Amir Hosic 80'	Stadium: Birchmount Stadium

June 9	Hamilton City SC	1–3	FC Ukraine United	Hamilton, Ontario
18:30	Vukasin Kovacevic 75'	Report	Kucherenko 41'; Malysh 81'; Milishchuk 91'	Stadium: Heritage Field

June 17	FC Ukraine United	1–1	Serbian White Eagles	Toronto, Ontario
21:00	Malysh 37'	Report	Luka Bojic 1'	Stadium: Centennial Stadium

June 22	Serbian White Eagles	1–0	FC Ukraine United	Toronto, Ontario
19:00	Vukomanović 46'	Report		Stadium: Centennial Park Stadium; Attendance: 150; Referee: Marco Jaramillo

June 30	SC Waterloo Region	0–9	FC Ukraine United	Waterloo, Ontario
18:30		Report	Falkovskyi,, Lukyanets,, Milishchuk, Bohdanov	Stadium: RIM Park

July 6	CSC Mississauga	2–4	FC Ukraine United	Mississauga, Ontario
	Remi Oshin 29'; Priestley 30'	Report	Milishchuk 34'; Datsiuk 45', 74'; Lukyanets 47'	Stadium: Iceland Field

July 14	Brantford Galaxy	1–7	FC Ukraine United	Hamilton, Ontario
	Slavko Knezevic	Report	Bohdanov; Datsiuk, Falkovskyi; Milishchuk; Hromyak; Lukyanets	Stadium: Heritage Field Turf

July 21	FC Ukraine United	1–1	SC Waterloo Region	Toronto, Ontario
14:00	Hromyak 51'	Report	Dzenan Karic 53'	Stadium: Esther Shiner Stadium

August 3	SC Real Mississauga	1–2	FC Ukraine United	Mississauga, Ontario
20:30	Brennan McNicol 75'	Report	Hromyak 7'; Malysh 82'	Stadium: Paramount Fine Foods Centre

August 18	FC Ukraine United	8–1	SC Real Mississauga	Toronto, Ontario
21:00	Hromyak 15', 27', 28'; Malysh 18'; Falkovskyi 70'; Datsiuk 71'; Lukyanets 81'	Report	Jpan Syla 59'	Stadium: Centennial Park Stadium

August 25	FC Ukraine United	3–0	Brantford Galaxy	Toronto, Ontario
21:00	Malysh; Milishchuk; Lukyanets 76'	Report		Stadium: Centennial Park Stadium; Referee: Afsar Khan

September 1	FC Vorkuta	2–3	FC Ukraine United	Toronto, Ontario
19:00	Riabets 27'; Volchkov 74'	Report	Amir Hosic; Savchenko 48'; Bohdanov	Stadium: Esther Shiner Stadium

September 9	FC Ukraine United	3–1	Hamilton City SC	Toronto, Ontario
19:00	Hromyak 9'; Falkovskyi 69', 80'	Report	Filip Seculik 85'	Stadium: Centennial Park Stadium

September 23	FC Ukraine United	10–2	CSC Mississauga	Toronto, Ontario
19:00	Bohdanov; Datsiuk, Hromyak, Lukyanets,, Malysh; Milishchuk	Report	Mauricio Konjic; Pero Menalo	Stadium: Centennial Park Stadium

==== Postseason ====
September 30 Quarterfinal	FC Ukraine United	0–0 (a.e.t.) (8–7 p)	Brantford Galaxy	Toronto, Ontario
16:00		Report		Stadium: Centennial Park Stadium

October 7 Semifinal	FC Ukraine United	1–2	Scarborough SC	Toronto, Ontario
14:00	Malysh 89'	Report	Bryan 68'; Stojiljkovic 91'	Stadium: Centennial Park Stadium

== Statistics ==
=== Goals ===
Correct as of September 30, 2018

First Division Goals
Pos.	Playing Pos.	Nation	Name	Appearances	Goals
1	FW	(Ukraine)	Pavlo Lukyanets	15	12
2	MF	(Ukraine)	Taras Hromyak	15	8
2	FW	(Ukraine)	Nazar Milishchuk	16	8
3	FW	(Ukraine)	Roman Datsiuk	15	7
3	MF	(Ukraine)	Yevhen Falkovskyi	13	7
3	FW	(Ukraine)	Ihor Malysh	16	7
4	FW	(Ukraine)	Vitaliy Bohdanov	12	4
5	FW		Amir Hosic	-	3
6	MF	(Ukraine)	Vasyl Chornyi	-	1
6	MF	(Ukraine)	Ivan Kucherenko	-	1
6	DF	(Ukraine)	Andriy Savchenko	-	1
Total				102	60
