= 2018 Brantford Galaxy season =

Brantford Galaxy
2018 season
- President: Bosko Borjan
- Head Coach: Milan Prpa
- Canadian Soccer League: 8th place (First Division)
- CSL Championship: Quarterfinal
- Top goalscorer: Slavko Knezevic (3 goals)
| Home colours | Away colours |

The 2018 season was Brantford Galaxy's seventh season in the Canadian Soccer League. Their season began on May 25, 2018, in an away match against CSC Mississauga. Despite the team's mediocre season they still clinched the final playoff berth. Their participation in the postseason was short lived as they were eliminated by FC Ukraine United in the first round. While their reserve squad faced a similar fate in the Second Division after losing to FC Vorkuta B in the opening round. The club's top goalscorer was Slavko Knezevic with three goals.

== Summary ==
After the departure of Sasa Vukovic to Hamilton City SC, the club brought in Milan Prpa as head coach. The roster assembled by Prpa remained primarily the same as the previous seasons with many notable veterans returning. Overall the changes in management achieved little difference in the performance of the club. As the club produced a mediocre season by finishing eighth in the First Division, but still managed to secure the final playoff berth. In the opening round of the postseason Brantford faced FC Ukraine United, but were eliminated in a penalty shootout.

Meanwhile, in the Second Division their reserve team managed to secure a postseason berth. In the playoffs they faced division champions FC Vorkuta B, and were defeated by a score of 3–1.

== Players ==
=== First Division roster ===
As of August 10, 2018

Note: Flags indicate national team as defined under FIFA eligibility rules; some limited exceptions apply. Players may hold more than one non-FIFA nationality.

| No. | Pos. | Nation | Player |
|---|---|---|---|
| 1 | GK | CRO | Giorgi Jovicic |
| 4 | DF | BIH | Zeljko Dokic |
| 5 | DF | MNE | Miljan Milovic |
| 6 | DF | CAN | Donart Beqiri |
| 7 | FW | BIH | Haris Redžepi |
| 8 | DF | SRB | Boris Milicic |
| 9 | MF | BIH | Saša Vidović |
| 10 | MF | CRO | Dragan Milovic |
| 11 | MF | | Zoran Cvijetic |
| 12 | MF | SRB | Adrian Tismenar |
| 14 | MF | | Filip Cvetic |
| 15 | DF | SRB | Nenad Nikolić |
| 16 | MF | | Adolfo Alvarado |

| No. | Pos. | Nation | Player |
|---|---|---|---|
| 17 | DF | BIH | Marko Djukic |
| 18 | MF | | Camilo Veloza |
| 19 | DF | BIH | Bojan Samardzija |
| 21 | DF | | Dalibor Josic |
| 22 | MF | | Slavko Knezevic |
| 24 | MF | CAN | Adam Villela |
| - | MF | | Mladen Gardovic |
| - | MF | SRB | Sasa Jelovac |
| - | MF | CAN | Andrej Prpa |
| - | DF | SRB | Dejan Ristić |
| - | MF | | Ilic Marko |
| - | MF | SRB | Uroš Vidović |

=== Second Division roster ===
As of September 19, 2018

Note: Flags indicate national team as defined under FIFA eligibility rules; some limited exceptions apply. Players may hold more than one non-FIFA nationality.

| No. | Pos. | Nation | Player |
|---|---|---|---|
| 2 | DF | CAN | Arsenije Japalak |
| 3 | DF | CAN | Michael Dhliwayo |
| 6 | MF | | Roberto Hogeveen |
| 7 | FW | | Aleksa Japalak |
| 11 | MF | | Brandon De Serpa |
| 15 | MF | | Brandon Beal |
| 16 | MF | | Dexter Hamilton |
| 18 | DF | | Rade Parenta |
| 19 | MF | | John Cordeiro |
| 20 | DF | | Nemanja Sudar |
| 27 | FW | | Harold Ranveau |
| - | DF | CAN | |
| – | MF | CAN | Ebenezer Adeniran |
| – | MF | | Mohamed Ali |
| – | GK | CAN | Alexander Borsos |
| – | MF | | Nikola Cekic |
| – | MF | | Paul Chakhov |
| – | DF | | Matteo Decosimi |

| No. | Pos. | Nation | Player |
|---|---|---|---|
| – | DF | | Milan Dvokic |
| – | DF | | Tyler Froates |
| – | DF | | Mark Fronda |
| – | FW | | Kareem Hassanein |
| – | MF | | Martyn Hookes |
| – | MF | | Ernest Jones-Hughes |
| – | MF | CAN | Zach Kingma |
| – | MF | | Josh Lachini |
| – | DF | | Charles Lanipekun |
| – | FW | | Alfonso Loto |
| – | GK | | Jeff Martins |
| – | FW | | Joaquim Martins |
| – | MF | | Andrew Misner |
| – | MF | | Aleksa Visekruna |
| – | MF | | Kyle Purcell |
| – | DF | | Bojan Spajic |
| – | MF | CAN | Pat Wilson |

=== Management ===
| Position | Staff |
|---|---|
| Head coach | Milan Prpa |
| Assistant coach | Aleksandar Pesic |
| Reserve head coach | Nikola Ilic |
| Team trainer | Dusan Dujic |
| Director | Bosko Borjan |
| President | Bosko Borjan |
| Game day manager | John Volpe |
| Media relations | Andrew Pilkington |

Last updated: August 10, 2018
Source: canadiansoccerleague.ca

=== In ===
| No. | Pos. | Player | Transferred from | Fee/notes | Source |
|---|---|---|---|---|---|
| 4 | DF | (Bosnia and Herzegovina) Željko Đokić | (Serbia) FK Zemun | Free Agent | |

=== Out ===
| No. | Pos. | Player | Transferred to | Fee/notes | Source |
|---|---|---|---|---|---|
| | MF | (Canada) Miroslav Čabrilo | (Canada) Hamilton City SC | Free Transfer | |

== Canadian Soccer League ==
=== First Division ===
| Pos | Team | Pld | W | D | L | GF | GA | GD | Pts | Qualification |
|---|---|---|---|---|---|---|---|---|---|---|
| 5 | Hamilton City | 16 | 8 | 1 | 7 | 41 | 38 | +3 | 25 | Playoffs |
| 6 | Serbian White Eagles | 16 | 5 | 4 | 7 | 20 | 20 | 0 | 19 | Playoffs |
| 7 | SC Real Mississauga | 16 | 3 | 2 | 11 | 14 | 42 | −28 | 11 | Playoffs |
| 8 | Brantford Galaxy | 16 | 3 | 2 | 11 | 9 | 37 | −28 | 11 | Playoffs |
| 9 | CSC Mississauga | 16 | 1 | 2 | 13 | 9 | 37 | −28 | 5 | |

Source: []
Rules for classification: 1) points; 2) goal difference; 3) number of goals scored.

=== Results summary ===
| Overall | | | | | | | | Home | | | | | | Away | | | | | |
| Pld | W | D | L | GF | GA | GD | Pts | W | D | L | GF | GA | GD | W | D | L | GF | GA | GD |
|---|---|---|---|---|---|---|---|---|---|---|---|---|---|---|---|---|---|---|---|
| 16 | 3 | 2 | 11 | 9 | 37 | −28 | 11 | 2 | 1 | 5 | 7 | 21 | −14 | 1 | 1 | 6 | 2 | 16 | −14 |

Last updated: September 20, 2018.
Source: 2018 Canadian Soccer League season

=== Results by round ===
| Round | 1 | 2 | 3 | 4 | 5 | 6 | 7 | 8 | 9 | 10 | 11 | 12 | 13 | 14 | 15 | 16 |
|---|---|---|---|---|---|---|---|---|---|---|---|---|---|---|---|---|
| Ground | A | H | H | A | H | H | H | H | H | A | A | A | H | A | A | A |
| Result | D | L | W | L | L | L | L | L | D | L | W | L | W | L | L | L |

Updated to match(es) played on September 27, 2018. Source: CSL
A = Away; H = Home; W = Win; D = Draw; L = Loss

=== Matches ===
| May 25 | CSC Mississauga | 0–0 | Brantford Galaxy | Mississauga, Ontario |
| 20:00 | | Report | | Stadium: Iceland Field |

| June 2 | Brantford Galaxy | 0–4 | Hamilton City SC | Hamilton, Ontario |
| 20:30 | | Report | Arsen Platis 8'; Sani Dey 18', 39'; Vukasin Kovacevic 50' | Stadium: Heritage Field |

| June 9 | Brantford Galaxy | 3–0 | CSC Mississauga | Hamilton, Ontario |
| 20:30 | Slavko Knezevic 63'; Adam Villella 68'; Jelovac 82' | Report | | Stadium: Heritage Field |

| June 17 | Scarborough SC | 3–0 | Brantford Galaxy | Toronto, Ontario |
| 20:00 | Bryan 15'; Stojiljkovic 55', 75' | Report | | Stadium: Birchmount Stadium |

| June 23 | Brantford Galaxy | 0–2 | FC Vorkuta | Hamilton, Ontario |
| 20:30 | | Report | Solonynko 25'; Haidarzhi 90' | Stadium: Heritage Field |

| July 14 | Brantford Galaxy | 1–7 | FC Ukraine United | Hamilton, Ontario |
| | Slavko Knezevic | Report | Bohdanov; Datsiuk, Falkovskyi; Milishchuk; Hromyak; Lukyanets | Stadium: Heritage Field Turf |

| July 21 | Brantford Galaxy | 1–4 | Scarborough SC | Hamilton, Ontario |
| 20:30 | Dragan Milovic 36' | Report | Hammud Ali Atif 1'; Stojiljković 8', 80'; Alen Kucalovic 45' | Stadium: Heritage Field |

| August 12 | Brantford Galaxy | 0–3 | Serbian White Eagles | Hamilton, Ontario |
| 20:30 | | Report | Andrej Marinkovic 8'; Milan Mitrovic 39'; Luka Bojic 51' | Stadium: Heritage Field |

| August 18 | Brantford Galaxy | 1–1 | SC Waterloo Region | Hamilton, Ontario |
| 20:30 | Vidovic 90' | Report | Jordan Aivaliotis 11' | Stadium: Heritage Field |

| August 25 | FC Ukraine United | 3–0 | Brantford Galaxy | Toronto, Ontario |
| 21:00 | Malysh; Milishchuk; Lukyanets 76' | Report | | Stadium: Centennial Park Stadium; Referee: Afsar Khan |

| August 31 | Serbian White Eagles | 0–1 | Brantford Galaxy | Toronto, Ontario |
| 19:00 | | Report | Filip Cvetic 59' | Stadium: Centennial Park Stadium |

| September 7 | SC Real Mississauga | 2–0 | Brantford Galaxy | Mississauga, Ontario |
| 20:30 | Senad Poracanin | Report | | Stadium: Paramount Fine Foods Centre |

| September 16 | Brantford Galaxy | 1–0 | SC Real Mississauga | Hamilton, Ontario |
| 20:30 | Donart Beqiri 14' | Report | | Stadium: Heritage Field |

| September 20 | FC Vorkuta | 5–0 | Brantford Galaxy | Toronto, Ontario |
| 21:00 | Gostiev 30', 32', 45'; Ivliev 50'; Kristijan Kezic 82' | Report | | Stadium: Esther Shiner Stadium |

| September 23 | Hamilton City SC | 2–1 | Brantford Galaxy | Hamilton, Ontario |
| 19:00 | Vukasin Kovacevic; Stefan Blazic | Report | Dokic | Stadium: Heritage Field |

| September 26 | SC Waterloo Region | 1–0 | Brantford Galaxy | Waterloo, Ontario |
| 20:30 | Miodrag Kovacevic | Report | | Stadium: RIM Park |

=== Postseason ===
| September 30 Quarterfinal | FC Ukraine United | 0–0 (a.e.t.) (8–7 p) | Brantford Galaxy | Toronto, Ontario |
| 16:00 | | Report | | Stadium: Centennial Park Stadium |

==== Second Division ====
| Pos | Team | Pld | W | D | L | GF | GA | GD | Pts | Qualification |
|---|---|---|---|---|---|---|---|---|---|---|
| 2 | Halton United | 15 | 10 | 0 | 5 | 48 | 20 | +28 | 30 | Playoffs |
| 3 | Scarborough SC B | 15 | 8 | 0 | 7 | 48 | 40 | +8 | 24 | Playoffs |
| 4 | Milton SC | 15 | 7 | 0 | 8 | 37 | 50 | −13 | 21 | Playoffs |
| 5 | Brantford Galaxy B | 15 | 5 | 1 | 9 | 25 | 32 | −7 | 16 | |
| 6 | Serbian White Eagles B | 15 | 2 | 0 | 13 | 13 | 80 | −67 | 6 | |

Source: http://canadiansoccerleague.ca/2018-second-division-standings/
Rules for classification: 1) points; 2) goal difference; 3) number of goals scored.

==== Results summary ====
| Overall | | | | | | | | Home | | | | | | Away | | | | | |
| Pld | W | D | L | GF | GA | GD | Pts | W | D | L | GF | GA | GD | W | D | L | GF | GA | GD |
|---|---|---|---|---|---|---|---|---|---|---|---|---|---|---|---|---|---|---|---|
| 15 | 5 | 1 | 9 | 25 | 32 | −7 | 16 | 3 | 0 | 4 | 15 | 15 | 0 | 2 | 1 | 5 | 10 | 17 | −7 |

Last updated: September 20, 2018.
Source: 2018 Canadian Soccer League season

==== Results by round ====
| Round | 1 | 2 | 3 | 4 | 5 | 6 | 7 | 8 | 9 | 10 | 11 | 12 | 13 | 14 | 15 |
|---|---|---|---|---|---|---|---|---|---|---|---|---|---|---|---|
| Ground | A | A | A | A | H | H | H | H | A | H | A | A | H | H | A |
| Result | L | L | W | W | L | W | L | W | L | W | D | L | L | L | L |

Updated to match(es) played on September 26, 2018. Source: CSL
A = Away; H = Home; W = Win; D = Draw; L = Loss

==== Matches ====
| June 2 | Halton United | 2–1 | Brantford Galaxy B | Burlington, Ontario |
| | | Report | | Stadium: Norton Park |

| June 10 | Scarborough SC B | 4–2 | Brantford Galaxy B | Vaughan, Ontario |
| | | Report | | Stadium: Joan of Arc Turf Field |

| June 17 | Milton SC | 2–3 | Brantford Galaxy B | Brantford, Ontario |
| | | Report | | Stadium: Steve Brown Sports Complex |

| June 22 | Serbian White Eagles B | 1–4 | Brantford Galaxy B | Toronto, Ontario |
| | | Report | | Stadium: Centennial Park Stadium |

| July 22 | Brantford Galaxy B | 2–4 | Halton United | Brantford, Ontario |
| | | Report | | Stadium: Steve Brown Sports Complex |

| July 29 | Brantford Galaxy B | 3–1 | Scarborough SC B | Brantford, Ontario |
| | | Report | | Stadium: Steve Brown Sports Complex |

| August 5 | Brantford Galaxy B | 3–4 | Milton SC | Brantford, Ontario |
| | | Report | | Stadium: Steve Brown Sports Complex |

| August 11 | Brantford Galaxy B | 3–0 | Serbian White Eagles B | Brantford, Ontario |
| | | Report | | Stadium: Steve Brown Sports Complex |

| August 12 | FC Vorkuta B | 3–0 | Brantford Galaxy B | Vaughan, Ontario |
| | | Report | | Stadium: St. Roberts S.S Field |

| August 15 | Brantford Galaxy B | 3–0 | Serbian White Eagles B | Brantford, Ontario |
| | | Report | | Stadium: Steve Brown Sports Complex |

| August 22 | FC Vorkuta B | 0–0 | Brantford Galaxy B | Vaughan, Ontario |
| 18:00 | | Report | | Stadium: St. Roberts S.S Field |

| August 25 | Halton United | 3–0 | Brantford Galaxy B | Burlington, Ontario |
| | | Report | | Stadium: Norton Park |

| September 5 | Brantford Galaxy B | 0–3 | Scarborough SC | Brantford, Ontario |
| | | Report | | Stadium: Steve Brown Sports Complex |

| September 9 | Brantford Galaxy B | 1–3 | FC Vorkuta B | Brantford, Ontario |
| | | Report | | Stadium: Steve Brown Sports Complex |

| September 14 | Milton SC | 2–0 | Brantford Galaxy B | Milton, Ontario |
| | | Report | | Stadium: Milton Sports Centre |

=== Postseason ===
| October 6 Semifinal | FC Vorkuta B | 3–1 | Brantford Galaxy B | Vaughan, Ontario |
| 15:00 | Kristijan Kezic 8', 45'; Antonenko 90' | Report | Donare Beqere 17' | Stadium: St. Roberts S.S Field |

== Statistics ==
=== Goals ===
Correct as of October 13, 2018

First Division Goals
| Pos. | Playing Pos. | Nation | Name | Appearances | Goals |
|---|---|---|---|---|---|
| 1 | MF | | Slavko Knezevic | 15 | 3 |
| 2 | DF | (Canada) | Donart Beqiri | - | 1 |
| 2 | MF | | Filip Cvetic | - | 1 |
| 2 | DF | (Bosnia and Herzegovina) | Željko Đokić | - | 1 |
| 2 | MF | (Serbia) | Sasa Jelovac | - | 1 |
| 2 | DF | (Serbia) | Uroš Vidović | - | 1 |
| 2 | MF | (Canada) | Adam Villela | - | 1 |
| Total | | | | 15 | 9 |

Second Division Goals
| Pos. | Playing Pos. | Nation | Name | Appearances | Goals |
|---|---|---|---|---|---|
| 1 | MF | (Canada) | Adam Villela | 10 | 4 |
| 1 | MF | | Pat Wilson | 10 | 4 |
| 2 | MF | | Dexter Hamilton | 10 | 3 |
| 3 | MF | (Canada) | Michael Dhliwayo | 7 | 2 |
| 3 | MF | (Canada) | Joaquim Martins | 9 | 2 |
| Total | | | | 46 | 15 |
