= 2018 SC Waterloo Region season =

SC Waterloo Region
2018 season
- Owner: Tony Kocis
- Head Coach: Radivoj Panic
- Canadian Soccer League: 3rd place (First Division)
- CSL Championship: Semifinal
- Top goalscorer: Miodrag Kovacevic (6 goals)
Home colours	Away colours

The 2018 season was SC Waterloo Region's eighth season in the Canadian Soccer League. Their season official commenced on June 2, 2018 in a home match against SC Real Mississauga. Overall the season was a successful one for the club as they finished in the top four by finishing third in the First Division. The previous time Waterloo finished in the top four was in 2015. In the postseason Waterloo defeated the Serbian White Eagles FC, but were eliminated in the semifinals to FC Vorkuta.The club's top goalscorer was Miodrag Kovacevic, a former player in the Serbian First League with six goals.

== Summary ==
In preparation for the 2018 season Waterloo appointed Radivoj Panić as the new head coach. The roster consisted of notable veterans such as Vladimir Zelenbaba, Adis Hasecic, Mohammad-Ali Heydarpour, and Sven Arapovic. After a slow start to the season the club rebounded to a seven match undefeated streak, and secured a postseason by finishing third in the standings. In the first round of the postseason Waterloo defeated Serbian White Eagles FC. In the semifinals they faced FC Vorkuta, but were eliminated in a penalty shootout.

== Team ==
=== Roster ===
As of August 10, 2018

Note: Flags indicate national team as defined under FIFA eligibility rules; some limited exceptions apply. Players may hold more than one non-FIFA nationality.

No.	Pos.	Nation	Player
1	MF		Dzenan Karic
3	DF	CAN	Sven Arapovic
8	MF	MNE	Miodrag Kovacevic
9	MF		Stevan Vasic
12	GK		Marko Jelic
14	FW	BIH	Adis Hasecic
15	DF		Milan Vujcic
16	DF		Thomas Sackor
18	MF	SRB	Radivoj Panic
22	MF		Augustin Gayflor
23	MF		Slobodan Ristic
24	MF		Edgard Alfaro

No.	Pos.	Nation	Player
25	DF		Milan Milanovski
31	MF		Vladimir Stankovic
34	MF		Daniel Corbo
35	FW		Milos Traskovic
36	FW	CAN	Ivan Cutura
38	MF		Gregor Jugelj
41	DF	SRB	Vladimir Zelenbaba
42	DF	LBA	Mohamed Aborig
-	MF		Jordan Aivaliotis
-	MF	CAN	Emilio Estevez
-	MF	USA	Mohammad-Ali Heydarpour
-	FW		Aleksander Mitic

=== Management ===
Position	Staff
Head coach	Radivoj Panic
Assistant coach	Jovan Duric
President	Tony Kocis
Manager	Vojislav Brisevac

Last updated: August 10, 2018
Source: canadiansoccerleague.ca

=== In ===
No.	Pos.	Player	Transferred from	Fee/notes	Source
3	DF	(Canada) Sven Arapovic	(Canada) Croatia AC	Free Transfer	
42	MF	(Canada) Mohamed Aborig	(Canada) K-W United FC	Free Transfer	
8	MF	(Montenegro) Miodrag Kovacevic	(Montenegro) OSK Igalo	Free Transfer	

== Competitions ==
=== Canadian Soccer League ===
==== First Division ====
Pos	Team	Pld	W	D	L	GF	GA	GD	Pts	Qualification
1	FC Ukraine United (A, C)	16	12	2	2	60	16	+44	38	Qualification for Playoffs
2	FC Vorkuta (A, O)	16	12	2	2	55	16	+39	38	Qualification for Playoffs
3	SC Waterloo Region (A)	16	9	2	5	34	33	+1	29	Qualification for Playoffs
4	Scarborough SC (A)	16	8	5	3	34	20	+14	29	Qualification for Playoffs
5	Hamilton City SC (A)	16	8	1	7	41	38	+3	25	Qualification for Playoffs
6	Serbian White Eagles (A)	16	5	4	7	20	20	0	19	Qualification for Playoffs
7	SC Real Mississauga (A)	16	3	2	11	14	42	−28	11	Qualification for Playoffs
8	Brantford Galaxy (A)	16	3	2	11	9	37	−28	11	Qualification for Playoffs
9	CSC Mississauga	16	1	2	13	9	37	−28	5	

Updated to match(es) played on September 27, 2018. Source: http://canadiansoccerleague.ca/2018-csl-first-division-standings/
Rules for classification: 1) points; 2) goal difference; 3) number of goals scored.
(A) Advance to a further round; (C) Champions; (O) Play-off winners

==== Results summary ====
Overall								Home						Away					
Pld	W	D	L	GF	GA	GD	Pts	W	D	L	GF	GA	GD	W	D	L	GF	GA	GD
16	9	2	5	34	33	+1	29	5	0	3	13	15	−2	4	2	2	21	18	+3

Last updated: September 20, 2018.
Source: 2018 Canadian Soccer League season

==== Results by round ====
Round	1	2	3	4	5	6	7	8	9	10	11	12	13	14	15	16
Ground	H	A	H	A	H	A	H	A	A	A	H	A	H	A	H	H
Result	W	L	L	L	L	D	W	W	D	W	W	W	L	W	W	W

Updated to match(es) played on September 27, 2018. Source: CSL
A = Away; H = Home; W = Win; D = Draw; L = Loss

==== Matches ====
June 2	SC Waterloo Region	3–0	SC Real Mississauga	Waterloo, Ontario
	Adis Hasecic 31', 33'; Zelenbaba 40'	Report		Stadium: RIM Park

June 9	FC Vorkuta	6–1	SC Waterloo Region	Vaughan, Ontario
20:00	Ivliev 13', 30', 68'; Melnyk 37'; Riabyi 41'; Ursulenko 58'	Report	Ivan Cutura 60'	Stadium: Ontario Soccer Centre

June 16	SC Waterloo Region	1–3	FC Vorkuta	Waterloo, Ontario
	Volchkov 60' (o.g.)	Report	Solonynko 23', 37'; Ivliev 48'	Stadium: RIM Park

June 23	Hamilton City SC	4–2	SC Waterloo Region	Hamilton, Ontario
18:30	Lucas Raposo 4'; Sani Dey 65'; Arsen Platis 74'; Cabrilo 80'	Report	Vladimir Stankovic 15'; Aleksander Mitic 67'	Stadium: Heritage Field

June 30	SC Waterloo Region	0–9	FC Ukraine United	Waterloo, Ontario
18:30		Report	Falkovskyi,, Lukyanets,, Milishchuk, Bohdanov	Stadium: RIM Park

July 21	FC Ukraine United	1–1	SC Waterloo Region	Toronto, Ontario
14:00	Hromyak 51'	Report	Dzenan Karic 53'	Stadium: Esther Shiner Stadium

August 4	SC Waterloo Region	1–0	CSC Mississauga	Waterloo, Ontario
18:30	Zelenbaba 72'	Report		Stadium: RIM Park

August 12	Scarborough SC	1–3	SC Waterloo Region	Toronto, Ontario
20:00	Dimitrov 57'	Report	Vladimir Stankovic; Mohamed Aborig; Zelenbaba 80'	Stadium: Birchmount Stadium

August 18	Brantford Galaxy	1–1	SC Waterloo Region	Hamilton, Ontario
20:30	Vidovic 90'	Report	Jordan Aivaliotis 11'	Stadium: Heritage Field

August 24	CSC Mississauga	3–4	SC Waterloo Region	Mississauga, Ontario
21:00	Toni Trograncic 48'; Carlos Hoffmann 75', 85'	Report	Zelenbaba 33'; Mohammad Ali Heydarpour 54'; Adis Hasecic 57'; Stevan Vasic 70'	Stadium: Iceland Field

August 31	SC Waterloo Region	3–0	Hamilton City SC	Waterloo, Ontario
20:30	Miodrag Kovacevic 45', 70'; Adis Hasecic 50'	Report		Stadium: RIM Park

September 9	SC Real Mississauga	1–6	SC Waterloo Region	Oakville, Ontario
17:00	Edmond Badal 80'	Report	Stevan Vasic 6'; Sven Arapovic 24', 28'; Ivan Cutura 35'; Slobodan Ristic 79'; Miodrag Kovasevic 83'	Stadium: Bronte Field

September 15	SC Waterloo Region	1–3	Scarborough SC	Waterloo, Ontario
18:30	Miodrag Kovacevic 3'	Report	Stojiljković 42'; Atif Hammud Ali 86', 89'	Stadium: RIM Park

September 21	Serbian White Eagles	1–3	SC Waterloo Region	Toronto, Ontario
19:00	Goran Kamber 55'	Report	Estevez; Sven Arapovic 45'; Adis Hasecic 89'	Stadium: Centennial Park Stadium; Referee: Marcos Jaramillo

September 23	SC Waterloo Region	3–0	Serbian White Eagles	Waterloo, Ontario
19:00	Miodrag Kovacevic; Ivan Cutura; Adis Hasecic	Report		Stadium: RIM Park

September 26	SC Waterloo Region	1–0	Brantford Galaxy	Waterloo, Ontario
20:30	Miodrag Kovacevic	Report		Stadium: RIM Park

==== Postseason ====
September 29 Quarterfinal	SC Waterloo Region	2–1 (a.e.t.)	Serbian White Eagles	Waterloo, Ontario
19:30	Miodrag Kovacevic 19'; Zelenbaba 115' (pen.)	Report	Pešić 90'	Stadium: RIM Park

October 6 Semifinal	FC Vorkuta	2–2 (a.e.t.) (4–3 p)	SC Waterloo Region	Vaughan, Ontario
19:00	Gostiev 45'; Ursulenko 117'	Report	Miodrag Kovacevic 42'; Sven Arapovic	Stadium: Ontario Soccer Centre

== Statistics ==
=== Goals ===
Correct as of September 30, 2018

First Division Goals
Pos.	Playing Pos.	Nation	Name	Appearances	Goals
1	MF	(Montenegro)	Miodrag Kovacevic	15	6
2	FW	(Bosnia and Herzegovina)	Adis Hasecic	12	5
2	FW	(Serbia)	Vladimir Zelenbaba	13	5
3	DF	(Canada)	Sven Arapovic	-	3
3	FW	(Canada)	Ivan Cutura	9	3
4	MF		Vladimir Stankovic	-	2
4	MF		Stevan Vasic	-	2
5	DF	(Libya)	Mohamed Aborig	-	1
5	MF		Jordan Aivaliotis	-	1
5	MF	(Canada)	Emilio Estevez	-	1
5	MF	(United States)	Mohammad-Ali Heydarpour	-	1
5	MF		Dzenan Karic	-	1
5	FW		Aleksander Mitic	-	1
5	MF		Slobodan Ristic	-	1
Total				48	33
