= 2017 SC Waterloo Region season =

SC Waterloo Region
2017 season
- Owner: Tony Kocis
- Head Coach: Stefan Ristic
- CSL: Quarter-finals
- Top goalscorer: IIija Bajcetic; Jure Glavina; Vladimir Zelenbaba (3 goals)
Home colours	Away colours

The 2017 SC Waterloo Region season was the seventh season in the club's participation in the Canadian Soccer League. They began the season on May 26, 2017 in an away match against Serbian White Eagles FC. The season concluded with Waterloo securing a postseason berth by finishing seventh in the standings. In the preliminary rounds of the playoffs they were defeated in a penalty shootout against Serbian White Eagles.

== Summary ==
After competing in the CSL Second Division for the 2016 season they returned to the First Division with former player Stefan Ristic managing the team. The organization still maintained a reserve team in the Second Division. Former veterans like Vladimir Zelenbaba, Drazen Vukovic, and Adis Hasecic returned for the 2017 season. Throughout the season Waterloo struggled to achieve sufficient results, but to managed to qualify for the postseason. Their playoff run came to quick conclusion in the first round after a defeat in a penalty shootout to the Serbian White Eagles. Their reserve squad also secured a postseason berth, but were eliminated in the playoff quarterfinals by FC Vorkuta B.

== Competitions ==
=== Canadian Soccer League ===
==== League table ====
===== First Division =====
Pos	Team	Pld	W	D	L	GF	GA	GD	Pts	Qualification
1	FC Vorkuta (C)	14	10	2	2	43	13	+30	32	Playoffs
2	Serbian White Eagles	14	9	4	1	38	14	+24	31	Playoffs
3	York Region Shooters (O)	14	9	3	2	34	7	+27	30	Playoffs
4	Scarborough SC	14	7	3	4	37	17	+20	24	Playoffs
5	Brantford Galaxy	14	6	0	8	26	37	−11	18	Playoffs
6	Milton SC	14	2	2	10	24	75	−51	8	Playoffs
7	SC Waterloo Region	14	1	5	8	19	33	−14	8	Playoffs
8	Royal Toronto FC	14	1	3	10	20	45	−25	6	Playoffs

Updated to match(es) played on September 11, 2017. Source: []
Rules for classification: 1) points; 2) goal difference; 3) number of goals scored.
(C) Champions; (O) Play-off winners

==== Results summary ====
Overall								Home						Away					
Pld	W	D	L	GF	GA	GD	Pts	W	D	L	GF	GA	GD	W	D	L	GF	GA	GD
14	1	5	8	19	33	−14	8	1	2	4	8	16	−8	0	3	4	11	17	−6

Last updated: September 10, 2017.
Source: CSL

==== Results by round ====
Round	1	2	3	4	5	6	7	8	9	10	11	12	13	14
Ground	A	H	A	H	H	A	H	A	H	A	A	A	H	H
Result	D	D	D	L	L	D	D	L	W	L	L	L	L	L

Updated to match(es) played on September 10, 2017. Source: CSL
A = Away; H = Home; W = Win; D = Draw; L = Loss

==== Matches ====
May 26	Serbian White Eagles	1–1	SC Waterloo	Toronto, Ontario
	Jočić 65'	Report	Adis Hasecic 50'	Stadium: Centennial Park Stadium; Attendance: 150; Referee: Vee Venne

June 4	SC Waterloo	2–2	FC Vorkuta	Waterloo, Ontario
	Drazen Vukovic; Zelenbaba	Report	Pidvirnyi,	Stadium: RIM Park

June 11	Royal Toronto FC	2–2	SC Waterloo	Toronto, Ontario
	Chris Simm,	Report	Drazen Vukovic; Zelenbaba	Stadium: Centennial Park Stadium

June 18	SC Waterloo	0–2	York Region Shooters	Vaughan, Ontario
		Report	Bryan; Darren Chambers	Stadium: RIM Park

July 2	SC Waterloo	0–4	Brantford Galaxy	Waterloo, Ontario
		Report	Maksim Boksic; Simeunovic; Vukovic; Bojan Samardzija	Stadium: RIM Park

July 7	York Region Shooters	2–2	SC Waterloo	Vaughan, Ontario
	Evan Beutler 23', 90'	Report	Jure Glavina 44', 71'	Stadium: St. Joan Of Arc Turf Field

July 14	SC Waterloo	1–1	Serbian White Eagles	Waterloo, Ontario
	Jure Glavina 37'	Report	Dusan Kovačević 30'	Stadium: RIM Park; Attendance: 100; Referee: Tony Amaral

July 22	FC Vorkuta	2–1	SC Waterloo	Toronto, Ontario
	Kerchu; Solonynko	Report	Jure Glavina	Stadium: Esther Shiner Stadium

July 30	SC Waterloo	3–0	Royal Toronto FC	Waterloo, Ontario
	Elia Basicic 70'; John Wojcik 83'; Adis Hasecic 90'	Report		Stadium: RIM Park

August 6	Milton SC	4–3	SC Waterloo Region	Milton, Ontario
	Scott Damion Tristan,,	Report		Stadium: Milton Community Park

August 12	Scarborough SC	4–1	SC Waterloo	Toronto, Ontario
	Angel Angelov 5'; Alen Kucalovic; Stojiljković,	Report	Zelenbaba 61'	Stadium: Birchmount Stadium

August 19	Brantford Galaxy	2–1	SC Waterloo	Brantford, Ontario
		Report		Stadium: Steve Brown Sports Complex

August 27	SC Waterloo	2–4	Milton SC	Waterloo, Ontario
	Mato Mrkonjic; Ilija Bajcetic	Report	Adnan Smajic, Leandro Aguilar,	Stadium: RIM Park

September 10	SC Waterloo	0–3	Scarborough SC	Waterloo, Ontario
		Report	Dimitrov 23', 70'; Stojiljković 35'	Stadium: RIM Park

==== League table ====
===== Second Division =====
Pos	Team	Pld	W	D	L	GF	GA	GD	Pts	Qualification
1	FC Ukraine United (C, O)	14	13	1	0	75	10	+65	40	Playoffs
2	Burlington SC	14	10	1	3	44	18	+26	31	Playoffs
3	FC Vorkuta B	14	8	0	6	41	25	+16	24	Playoffs
4	Brantford Galaxy B	14	7	1	6	29	35	−6	22	Playoffs
5	Serbian White Eagles B	14	6	0	8	32	59	−27	18	Playoffs
6	SC Waterloo B	14	5	1	8	26	39	−13	16	Playoffs
7	Royal Toronto B	14	5	0	9	32	58	−26	15	Playoffs
8	London City SC	14	0	0	14	11	46	−35	0	

Updated to match(es) played on September 7, 2017. Source: canadiansoccerleague.ca
Rules for classification: 1) points; 2) goal difference; 3) number of goals scored.
(C) Champions; (O) Play-off winners

==== Results summary ====
Overall								Home						Away					
Pld	W	D	L	GF	GA	GD	Pts	W	D	L	GF	GA	GD	W	D	L	GF	GA	GD
14	5	1	8	26	39	−13	16	3	1	3	14	21	−7	2	0	5	12	18	−6

Last updated: September 10, 2017.
Source: CSL

==== Results by round ====
Round	1	2	3	4	5	6	7	8	9	10	11	12	13	14
Ground	A	H	A	H	A	H	A	H	A	A	H	H	H	A
Result	W	L	L	L	W	W	L	W	L	L	L	W	D	L

Updated to match(es) played on September 10, 2017. Source: CSL
A = Away; H = Home; W = Win; D = Draw; L = Loss

=== Goals and assists ===
Correct as of November 30, 2017

First Division Goals
Pos.	Playing Pos.	Nation	Name	Appearances	Goals
1	FW	(Serbia)	IIija Bajcetic	10	3
1	FW	(Bosnia and Herzegovina)	Jure Glavina	3	3
1	MD	(Serbia)	Vladimir Zelenbaba	14	3
4	MD	(Bosnia and Herzegovina)	Adis Hasecic	13	2
4	FW	(Croatia)	Drazen Vukovic	4	2
6	MF	(Canada)	Wesley Cain	2	1
6	DF	(Canada)	Mato Mrkonjic	11	1
6	MD	(Canada)	Nekesh Nair	3	1
6	MD	(Canada)	Mussa Ngendo	7	1
6	MD	(Canada)	John Wojcik	5	1
Total				72	18

Second Division Goals
Pos.	Playing Pos.	Nation	Name	Appearances	Goals
1	MF	(Canada)	Aleksander Mitic	9	5
2	FW	(Canada)	Filip Zivkovic	11	3
3	FW	(Canada)	Dzenan Karic	3	2
3	MF	(Serbia)	Vladimir Zelenbaba	7	2
5	MF	(Canada)	Mohamed El-Naggar	10	1
5	DF	(Canada)	Mato Mrkonjic	7	1
5	MF	(Canada)	Mussa Ngendo	8	1
5	MF	(Canada)	Aidan Porter	4	1
5	MF	(Serbia)	Milan Vujcic	5	1
Total				64	17
