= Mykola Hreshta =

Ukrainian footballer (born 1984)

Personal information
- Full name: Mykola Petrovych Hreshta
- Date of birth: 25 February 1984 (age 42)
- Place of birth: Lviv, Ukrainian SSR
- Position: Defender

Senior career*
Years	Team	Apps	(Gls)
2001–2004	Karpaty Lviv	0	(0)
2001–2004	Karpaty-2 Lviv	51	(6)
2001–2004	Karpaty-3 Lviv	38	(3)
2005–2006	Enerhetyk Burshtyn	12	(0)
2005–2006	Skala Stryi	13	(0)
2006–2008	Nyva Ternopil	39	(3)
2008	Halychyna Lviv		
2008	Rava Rava-Ruska		
2009	Spartakus Szarowola	14	(1)
2009	Shakhtar Chervonohrad		
2011	Karpaty Kolomyia	14	(7)
2012	Rukh Vynnyky	19	(3)
2013	Karpaty Kamianka-Buzka	8	(1)
2013–2014	SCC Demnya	15	(2)
2014	Standard Artasiv		
2014–2015	Wkra Żuromin		
2016–2018	Ukraine United		
- * Club domestic league appearances and goals

Mykola Hreshta (Ukrainian: Микола Петрович Грешта; born 25 February 1984) is a former footballer from Ukraine who played as a defender.

== Club career ==
=== Early career ===
Hreshta began his professional career in 2001 by signing with Karpaty Lviv. He made his professional debut in the Ukrainian First League with Karpaty-2 Lviv. He also played with the club's second reserve team Karpaty-3 Lviv in the Ukrainian Second League.

After four seasons with Karpaty Lviv, he signed with Enerhetyk Burshtyn, but played the remainder of the season with league rivals Skala Stryi. In 2006, he returned to the Ukrainian third-tier league with Nyva Ternopil. In his second season with Nyva, he debuted in the Ukrainian Cup, where the club was eliminated in the round of 16 by Premier League side Tavriya Simferopol. Throughout the season, he received a trial with Oleksandriya.

After he departed from Nyva Ternopil, he played in the Lviv regional league with Halychyna Lviv. He played the remainder of the 2008 season with Rava Rava-Ruska and won the league title.

=== Spartakus Szarowola ===
In 2008, he played in the Polish III liga with Spartakus Szarowola. After a season with Spartakus Szarowola, he played several friendly matches for Stal Stalowa Wola. Ultimately, he signed a contract with Stal Stalowa Wola, but never made an appearance for the club.

=== Local circuits ===
After his stint in Poland, he returned to the Ukrainian regional circuits, where he played for Shakhtar Chervonograd and Karpaty Kolomyia. Hresta helped Karpaty Kolomyia secure a double by winning both the Ivano-Frankivsk regional league title and cup. The following season, he returned to the Lviv region and signed with Rukh Vynnyky. In his debut season with Rukh, he won his second Lviv regional league double.

He also played with Karpaty Kamenka-Bug and CCM Demnya.

=== Poland ===
In 2014, he joined the Polish side Wkra Żuromin and competed in the IV liga for two seasons.

=== Canada ===
In the summer of 2016, he played in the Canadian Soccer League with FC Ukraine United. In his debut season in the Canadian circuit, he helped the club secure a playoff berth by finishing second in the league's first division. Their playoff campaign would conclude in the semi-finals after a defeat by the Serbian White Eagles.

The following season, the club competed in the league's second division, where they defeated Burlington SC for the championship. Hreshta re-signed with FC Ukraine United in 2018, when the club rejoined the league's first division. He helped the club secure the divisional title. However, the Toronto side was eliminated from the postseason in the second round by Scarborough SC.

== Honors ==
FC Karpaty Kolomyia

- Ivano-Frankivsk Oblast Championship: 2011
- Ivano-Frankivsk Oblast Cup: 2011

FC Rava Rava-Ruska

- Lviv Oblast Championship: 2008
- Lviv Oblast Cup: 2008

FC Rukh Vynnyky

- Lviv Oblast Championship: 2012
- Lviv Oblast Cup: 2012

FC Ukraine United

- CSL II Championship: 2017
- Canadian Soccer League First Division: 2018
- Canadian Soccer League Second Division: 2017
