= Lyubomyr Ivanskyi =

Ukrainian footballer

Lubomyr Ivanskyi
Personal information
- Full name: Lubomyr Mykhailovych Ivanskyi
- Date of birth: 11 January 1983 (age 43)
- Place of birth: Lviv, Ukraine SSR, Soviet Union
- Position: Left-back

Youth career
- Karpaty Lviv

Senior career*
Years	Team	Apps	(Gls)
1998–2005	Karpaty Lviv	16	(0)
1998–2005	→ Karpaty-2 Lviv	84	(0)
2001–2002	→ Karpaty-3 Lviv	9	(0)
2005–2007	Obolon Kyiv	28	(0)
2005–2007	→ Obolon-2 Kyiv	8	(0)
2007	Wisła Płock	7	(0)
2007–2008	Stal Alchevsk	8	(1)
2007–2008	Stal-2 Alchevsk	1	(0)
2008–2010	Arsenal-Kyivshchyna Bila Tserkva	33	(3)
2008–2009	→ Komunalnyk Luhansk (loan)	6	(0)
2010–2011	Resovia	4	(0)
2011	Karpaty Kamianka-Buzka	11	(1)
2011–2012	Desna Chernihiv	3	(0)
2012–2014	Rukh Vynnyky	35	(1)
2015–2016	Karyer Torchynovitse	20	(0)
2016–2018	Ukraine United		

International career
2002–2004	Ukraine U21	6	(0)
- * Club domestic league appearances and goals

Lubomyr Ivanskyi (Ukrainian: Любомир Михайлович Іванський; born 11 January 1983) is a Ukrainian former professional footballer who played as a left-back.

== Club career ==
=== Europe ===
Ivanskyi was a pupil of Karpaty Lviv and made his professional debut in the Ukrainian Second League with their reserve team Karpaty-2 Lviv in 1999. He played in the Ukrainian Premier League in 2000 with the senior team against CSKA Kyiv. During his time with the senior club, he made his debut in the Ukrainian Cup against Shakhtar Donetsk on November 26, 2001.

He played for the Karpaty organization for seven seasons and also for the club's second reserve team Karpaty-3 Lviv. After Karpaty's relegation, he signed with Obolon Kyiv in the Ukrainian First League. In 2007, he went abroad to Poland to sign with Ekstraklasa club Wisła Płock.

Following his run in Poland, he returned to the Ukrainian second tier to join Stal Alchevsk. In 2008, he played in the third tier with Arsenal Bila Tserkva. In his debut season, Ivanskyi helped Bila Tserkva secure promotion. He re-signed with the club the following season. He had a loan spell for Komunalnyk Luhansk during his second season with Bila Tserkva.

In 2010, he returned to Poland to sign with II liga club Resovia. After his second stint in Poland, he played in the Lviv region for Karpaty Kamenka-Buzka. In 2011, he returned to the professional ranks by signing with Desna Chernihiv.

After he left Chernihiv, he signed with Rukh Vynnyky and helped them win the Lviv regional league double. The following season, he played in the Ukrainian Football Amateur League and helped Vynnyky finish as runners-up. In 2014, he helped Vynnyky win the national amateur title by defeating AF-Pyatykhatska Volodymyrivka.

=== Canada ===
In the summer of 2016, he played abroad in the Canadian Soccer League with Ukraine United. In his debut season in the Canadian circuit, he helped the club secure a playoff berth by finishing second in the league's first division. In the preliminary round of the postseason, the team defeated the Brantford Galaxy. Their playoff campaign would conclude in the next round after a defeat to the Serbian White Eagles.

The following season, the club competed in the league's second division, where he helped win the league double. In the championship final, they defeated Burlington SC. The following season, the club returned to the league's first division, where Ivanskyi was re-signed. He helped the club secure the divisional title and, as a result, clinched a playoff berth. However, the Toronto side was eliminated in the second round of the postseason by Scarborough SC.

== International career ==
Ivanskyi made his debut for the Ukraine national under-21 football team on February 3, 2004, against Greece. In total, he represented Ukraine in 6 matches.

== Honors ==
Rukh Vynnyky

- Ukrainian Amateur Football Championship: 2014
- Lviv Oblast Championship: 2012
- Lviv Oblast Cup: 2012

FC Ukraine United

- CSL II Championship: 2017
- Canadian Soccer League First Division: 2018
- Canadian Soccer League Second Division: 2017
