= Saša Jelovac =

Serbian footballer

Personal information
- Date of birth: January 14, 1981 (age 45)
- Place of birth: Yugoslavia
- Height: 1.74 m (5 ft 9 in)
- Position: Forward

Senior career*
Years	Team	Apps	(Gls)
1999–2002	Zemun	16+	(2)
2002	Sileks	16	(1)
2003	Belasica	20	(3)
2004–2005	Shkendija	26	(4)
2005–2006	Paniliakos	28	(1)
2006–2007	Trikala	30	(8)
2007–2008	Olympiacos Volos	28	(6)
2008	Pyrsos Grevena	16	(1)
2009	Panetolikos	6	(1)
2009	Makedonikos		
2010–2011	Fokikos		
2012	Brantford Galaxy		
2018	Brantford Galaxy		
- * Club domestic league appearances and goals

Saša Jelovac (Serbian Cyrillic: Caшa Jeлoвaц; born 14 January 1981) is a Serbian retired football forward.

== Club career ==
Jelovac previously played for FK Zemun in the First League of FR Yugoslavia Then he moved to Macedonia where he played in the First League sides FK Sileks in 2002–03, and FK Belasica in 2003–04 and FK Shkendija in 2004–05.

Jelovac moved to Greece in 2005, and has played for several second and third division clubs, including Paniliakos F.C., Trikala F.C., Olympiacos Volos, Panetolikos F.C. and Makedonikos F.C. He was released by Makedonikos in 2009, and joined third division rivals Fokikos F.C. in February 2010.

In 2012, he played with Brantford Galaxy in the Canadian Soccer League, and returned for the 2018 season.
