= Volodymyr Romaniv =

Association football player

Personal information
- Full name: Volodymyr Bohdanvych Romaniv
- Date of birth: June 16, 1985 (age 41)
- Place of birth: Ukraine SSR, Soviet Union
- Position: Midfielder

Senior career*
Years	Team	Apps	(Gls)
2005–2006	FSC Bukovyna Chernivtsi	10	(0)
2011–2013	FC Rukh Vynnyky	31	(3)
2016–2019	FC Ukraine United		
- * Club domestic league appearances and goals

Volodymyr Romaniv (born June 16, 1985) is a Ukrainian footballer who played as a midfielder.

== Playing career ==
Romaniv began his career in 2005 with FSC Bukovyna Chernivtsi in the Ukrainian Second League, where he appeared in 10 matches. In 2011, he signed with FC Rukh Vynnyky in the Lviv Oblast League where he won the Lviv Oblast title, Lviv Oblast Super Cup, and Lviv Oblast Cup. In 2016, he went overseas to Canada to play with FC Ukraine United of the Canadian Soccer League. In his second season he assisted FC Ukraine in achieving a perfect season, and winning the Second Division Championship. While in his third year he assisted in securing the First Division title.
