= Ivan Kucherenko (footballer) =

Ukrainian footballer

Personal information
- Full name: Ivan Vasilyevych Kucherenko
- Date of birth: June 1, 1987 (age 39)
- Place of birth: Ukrainian SSR, Soviet Union
- Position: Defender

Senior career*
| Years | Team | Apps | (Gls) |
| 2004–2008 | FC Kryvbas Kryvyi Rih | 4 | (0) |
| 2004–2006 | →FC Kryvbas-3 Kryvyi Rih (loan) | 5 | (1) |
| 2005–2006 | →FC Kryvbas-2 Kryvyi Rih (loan) | 6 | (1) |
| 2008 | FC Astana | 11 | (0) |
| 2009 | Lokomotiv Tashkent FK | 10 | (0) |
| 2009–2011 | FC Hirnyk Kryvyi Rih | 21 | (4) |
| 2011 | Olmaliq FK | 18 | (1) |
| 2011–2013 | FC Poltava | 23 | (3) |
| 2013 | FC Astana-1964 | 10 | (2) |
| 2013–2014 | FC Tytan Armyansk | 9 | (0) |
| 2015–2016 | FC Inhulets-2 Petrove | 13 | (1) |
| 2016 | Druzhba Novomykolayivka | | |
| 2017– | FC Ukraine United | | |
- * Club domestic league appearances and goals as of December 9, 2018

Ivan Kucherenko (born June 1, 1987) is a Ukrainian footballer playing with FC Ukraine United in the Ontario Soccer League.

== Playing career ==
=== Ukraine and Central Asia ===
Kucherenko began his career in 2004 with FC Kryvbas Kryvyi Rih in the Ukrainian Premier League. Throughout his tenure with Kryvbas Kryvyi Rih he spent time in the Ukrainian Second League with FC Kryvbas-2 Kryvyi Rih. In 2008, he played abroad in the Kazakhstan Premier League with FC Astana, and the following season in the Uzbekistan Super League with Lokomotiv Tashkent FK. After two seasons abroad he returned to the Ukrainian Second League to play with FC Hirnyk Kryvyi Rih, and in 2011 returned to the Uzbekistan Super League to sign with Olmaliq FK. In 2013, he returned to Kazakhstan for another stint with FC Astana-1964.

In late 2011, he assisted FC Poltava in securing promotion to the Ukrainian First League by finishing first in the standings. Afterwards in 2013-14 he played with FC Tytan Armyansk in the Ukrainian First League, and later in the Ukrainian Football Amateur League with FC Inhulets-2 Petrove, and Druzhba Novomykolayivka.

=== Canada ===
In 2017, he traveled abroad for the third time in order to play in the Canadian Soccer League with FC Ukraine United. In his debut season he assisted FC Ukraine in achieving a perfect season, and winning the Second Division Championship. In his sophomore year in Toronto he assisted in securing the First Division title. In 2019, he featured in the CSL Championship final against Scarborough SC, but in a losing effort. He played in the Ontario Soccer League in 2021 with Ukraine United.

In 2023, he returned to the CSL circuit, to sign with expansion side Dynamo Toronto.

== Honors ==
FC Ukraine United

- CSL II Championship: 2017
- Canadian Soccer League First Division: 2018
- Canadian Soccer League Second Division: 2017
- CSL Championship runner-up: 2019
