= Roman Kukharskyi =

Ukrainian footballer (born 1995)

Personal information
- Full name: Roman Stepanovych Kukharskyi
- Date of birth: 5 March 1995 (age 31)
- Place of birth: Ternopil, Ukraine
- Position: Midfielder

Team information
- Current team: SV 90 Altengottern

Senior career*
Years	Team	Apps	(Gls)
2012–2014	FC Sevastopol	0	(0)
2012–2013	→ FC Sevastopol-2 (loan)	7	(0)
2014–2016	Nyva Ternopil	22	(0)
2016	FC Sambir	10	(2)
2016–2017	ASKÖ Bruck-Peuerbach		
2016–2017	Nyva Ternopil	33	(2)
2016–2018	FC Ternopil	14	(0)
2017–2018	FC TSK Simferopol	11	(3)
2017–2019	SV 90 Altengottern	2	(3)
2019	FC Ukraine United		
2020–	SV 90 Altengottern		
- * Club domestic league appearances and goals as of 23 November 2020

Roman Kukharskyi (born 5 March 1995) is a Ukrainian footballer who plays as a midfielder for Landesliga club SV 90 Altengottern.

== Career ==
Kukharskyi signed with FC Sevastopol in 2012, but primarily played with the FC Sevastopol-2 reserve team in the Ukrainian Second League. In 2015, he played in the Ukrainian First League with FC Nyva Ternopil. He later played in the Ukrainian Amateur Football Championship with FC Sambir, and played abroad in Austria in 2016 with ASKÖ Bruck-Peuerbach. He returned to play in the Ukrainian First League in 2017 with FC Ternopil. In late 2017, he played in the Crimean Premier League with FC TSK Simferopol.

The following season he played abroad once more in the Landesliga with SV 90 Altengottern. In 2020, he played in the Canadian Soccer League with FC Ukraine United. In his debut season with Ukraine United he featured in the CSL Championship final against Scarborough SC. In 2020, he returned to play with SV 90 Altengottern.
