= Andriy Savchenko (footballer) =

Ukrainian footballer

Personal information
- Full name: Andriy Volodymyrovych Savchenko
- Date of birth: 29 September 1994 (age 32)
- Place of birth: Drohobych, Lviv Oblast, Ukraine
- Height: 1.74 m (5 ft 8 1/2 in)
- Position: Defender

Youth career
- 2007: Hart-Ros' Irpin
- 2007–2011: UFK Lviv

Senior career*
Years	Team	Apps	(Gls)
2011–2014	FC Karpaty Lviv	1	(0)
2017–	FC Ukraine United		(0)

International career^{‡}
2010	Ukraine-16	7	(0)
2010–2011	Ukraine-17	11	(0)
2011–2012	Ukraine-18	8	(0)
- * Club domestic league appearances and goals as of 7 December 2017 ‡ National team caps and goals as of 12 May 2015

Andriy Savchenko (Ukrainian: Андрій Володимирович Савченко; born 29 September 1994) is a professional Ukrainian football defender who plays with FC Ukraine United in the Canadian Soccer League.

== Career ==
Savchenko is a product of the UFK Lviv School System. He made his debut for FC Karpaty playing full-time in the match against FC Vorskla Poltava on 14 July 2013 in the Ukrainian Premier League. In 2017, he played abroad in the Canadian Soccer League with FC Ukraine United. In his debut season he assisted FC Ukraine in achieving a perfect season, and claimed the CSL Second Division Championship. While in his second year he assisted in securing the First Division title.

== International career ==
He also played for the Ukrainian under-17 national football team and was called up for other age level representations.
