= Vitaliy Bohdanov =

Ukrainian footballer

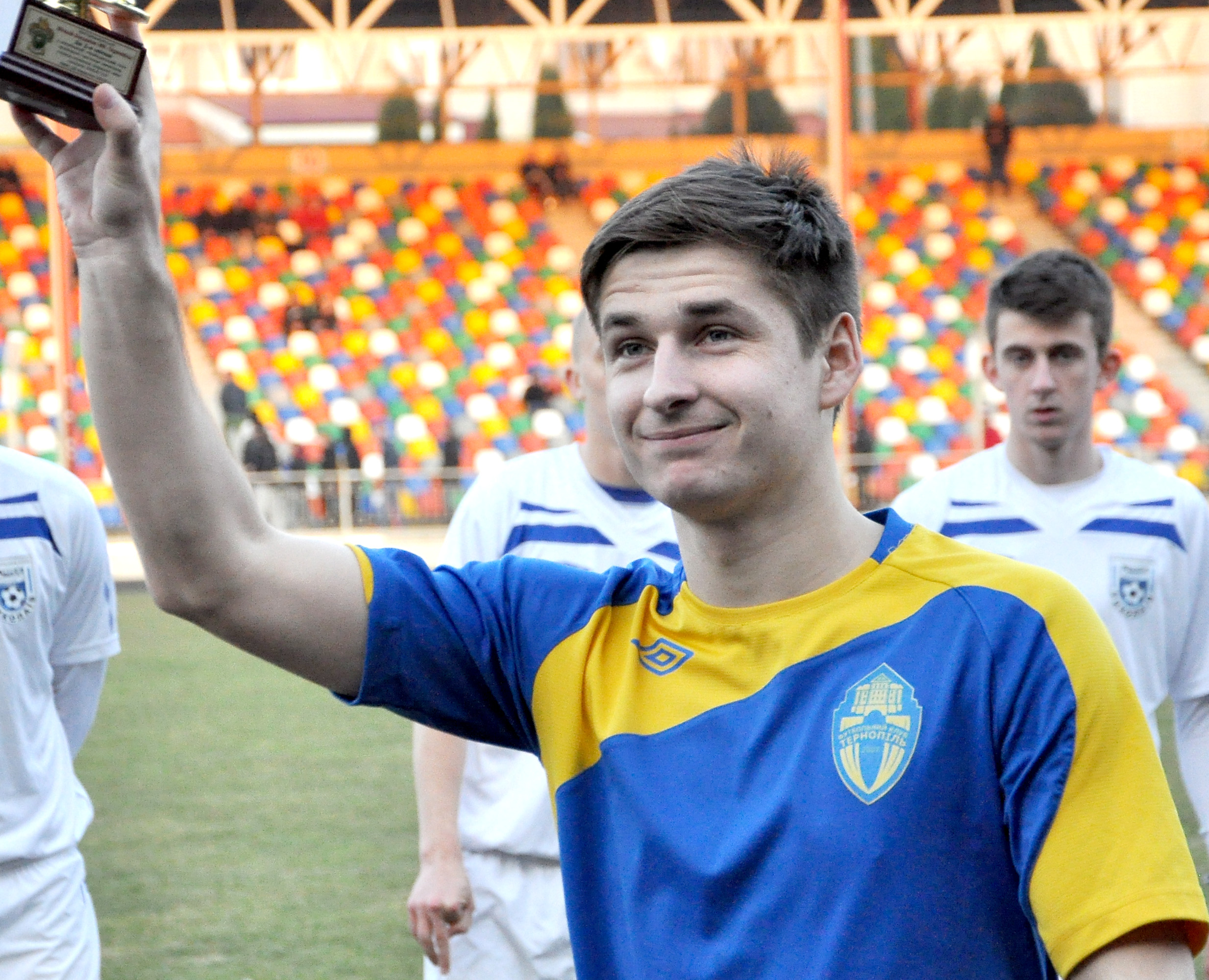
- Bohdanov in 2015

Personal information
- Full name: Vitaliy Hennadyevych Bohdanov
- Date of birth: 22 February 1990 (age 36)
- Place of birth: Hoshcha, Soviet Union
- Position: Midfielder

Senior career*
Years	Team	Apps	(Gls)
2012–2017	Ternopil	124	(21)
2017–2018	ODEK Orzhiv	18	(2)
2018	Ukraine United	12	(4)
2018–2022	ODEK Orzhiv		
2022	Slavia Velyka Omelyana		
2022–2023	Kolos Polonne		
2024	Slavia Velyka Omelyana		
2025	FC Kostopil		
2025–2026	Kolos Polonne		
- * Club domestic league appearances and goals

Vitaliy Bohdanov (Ukrainian: Віталій Геннадійович Богданов; born February 22, 1990) is a Ukrainian footballer.

== Club career ==
=== Early career ===
Bohdanov began playing at the local level in 2006 with FC Hoscha-AMAKO.

In 2012, Bohdanov joined the professional ranks by signing with Ternopil of the Ukrainian Second League. In his debut season with Ternopil, he debuted in the Ukrainian Cup against Krystal Kherson. Ternopil re-signed him for the following season. He also helped the club secure promotion to the Ukrainian First League. In the 2013–14 Ukrainian Cup, he scored a goal against Ukrainian Premier League side Vorskla Poltava, which advanced the club to the quarterfinals.

After the club secured a promotion, he was re-signed for the following campaign. In his debut season in the second-tier league, he won the best goal of the competition. After the 2014-15 season, he was rumored to leave, but he re-signed with the club. In the 2015–16 Ukrainian Cup, the team reached the round of 16, where Shakhtar Donetsk eliminated them. In 2016, he re-signed with Ternopil for his final season with the club. He participated in the 2017 Oleg Makarov Memorial, where he was nominated as the tournament's best player.

After Ternopil's relegation in 2017, he competed in the Ukrainian Football Amateur League with ODEK Orzhiv. He played with Orzhiv for two seasons and won the Rivne regional league in 2017.

=== Canada ===
In the summer of 2018, he played in the Canadian Soccer League with FC Ukraine United. In his debut season in Toronto, he helped the club win the league's first division title. In the first round of the playoffs, they advanced by defeating the Brantford Galaxy. In the following round, they were eliminated by Scarborough SC.

=== Ukraine ===
After his stint in Canada, he returned to ODEK Orzhiv to compete in the national amateur league. In 2020, the club also competed in the Rivne regional league, where he helped Orzhiv win the championship. After four seasons with Orzhiv, he played at the regional level with Slavia Velyka Omelyana in 2022.

In 2022, he returned to compete in the national amateur league by signing with Kolos Polonne. In his debut season, he helped Kolos secure the divisional title. Bohdanov signed with FC Kostopil to play in the 2025–26 Ukrainian Football Amateur League season. Midway through the season, he joined his former team Kolos Polonne.

== International career ==
Bohdanov represented the Ukrainian national student football team at the 2015 Summer Universiade.

== Personal life ==
In 2016, his wife, Tatyana, gave birth to a son.

== Honors ==
FC Kolos Polonne

- Ukrainian Amateur Football Championship Group 1: 2022–23

FC ODEK Orzhiv

- Rivne Oblast Championship: 2017, 2020

FC Ukraine United

- Canadian Soccer League First Division: 2018
