= Ihor Malysh =

Ukrainian footballer

Ihor Malysh Ігор Малиш
Personal information
- Full name: Ihor Anatoliyovych Malysh
- Date of birth: 15 July 1983 (age 43)
- Place of birth: Kovel, Volyn Oblast, Ukrainian SSR
- Height: 1.90 m (6 ft 3 in)
- Position: Midfielder

Youth career
- 1998–1999: Kovel-Volyn Kovel

Senior career*
Years	Team	Apps	(Gls)
2000	Podillya Khmelnytskyi	6	(0)
2001–2003	Volyn Lutsk	2	(0)
2001–2003	→ Kovel-Volyn Kovel	49	(2)
2004–2005	Neman Grodno	41	(1)
2006–2009	Obolon Kyiv	72	(0)
2008	→ Obolon-2 Kyiv	8	(2)
2010–2011	Zakarpattia Uzhhorod	23	(0)
2011	Krymteplytsia Molodizhne	19	(8)
2012	Maccabi Petah Tikva	7	(0)
2012–2013	Avanhard Kramatorsk	27	(4)
2013–2014	Nyva Ternopil	24	(4)
2014	Naftovyk-Ukrnafta Okhtyrka	8	(1)
2015	Mykolaiv	1	(0)
2016	Veres Rivne	7	(0)
2016–2018	Avanhard Kramatorsk	52	(1)
2018	FC Ukraine United	16	(7)
- * Club domestic league appearances and goals as of 8 December 2018

Ihor Malysh (Ukrainian: Ігор Анатолійович Малиш; born 15 July 1983) is a professional Ukrainian former football midfielder.

== Club career ==
=== Early career ===
Malysh is a product of the Kovel-Volyn Sportive School System and began his professional career in 2000 in the Ukrainian Second League with Podillya Khmelnytskyi. In 2001, he played in the Ukrainian First League with Volyn Lutsk and featured with the reserve team Kovel-Volyn Kovel in the Ukrainian Second League.

=== Belarus ===
In 2004, he played abroad in the Belarusian Premier League with Neman Grodno. During his time with Grodno, he participated in the 2005 UEFA Intertoto Cup against Tescoma Zlín.

=== Premier League ===
After a season abroad, he returned to the Ukrainian First League and played with Obolon Kyiv. In 2009, he helped the Kyiv-based club secure promotion to the Ukrainian Premier League and he appeared in 4 matches and recorded 1 goal in the top flight.

He resumed playing in the first division the following season by signing with Zakarpattia Uzhgorod.

After two seasons with Zakarpattia, he played in the Crimean region with Krymteplytsia Molodizhne. Before his loan move to Israel, he was the club's top goal scorer with 8 goals.

=== Israel ===
In the winter of 2012, he went abroad for the second time to play in the Israeli Premier League with Maccabi Petah Tikva F.C. He would appear in 17 matches for the club. During his time in the Middle East, he was linked to a possible move to Belarusian side Shakhtar Soligorsk.

=== Ukraine ===
Malysh returned to the Ukrainian second division for the 2012-13 season after securing a one-year contract with Avanhard Kramatorsk. He continued playing in the second tier as he was signed by Nyva Ternopil in the 2013 summer transfer market. His tenure with the Western Ukrainian club lasted only a single season as he experienced financial difficulties with the organization.

For the 2014-15 campaign, he secured a deal with Naftovyk-Ukrnafta Okhtyrka. His stint with Okhtyrka was short-lived as he signed with Mykolaiv in 2015. In the winter of 2016, he played in the third division with Veres Rivne. In his debut season with Veres, he helped the club secure promotion to the second division. Once the season came to a conclusion, he departed from the club.

Malysh would return to the second division by signing with his former club Avanhard Kramatorsk in the summer of 2016. His contract with Avanhard was terminated in the winter of 2018.

=== Canada ===
After his release from Avanhard, he began another spell abroad in the southern Ontario-based Canadian Soccer League with FC Ukraine United. In his debut season in Toronto, he would assist the club in securing the divisional title and as a result in clinching a playoff berth. However, the Toronto side was eliminated from the postseason competition in the second round by Scarborough SC where he did manage to contribute a goal in a losing effort. In total, he appeared in 16 matches and scored 7 goals in the Canadian circuit.

=== Amateur level ===
Following his stint in Canada, he returned to Ukraine to play in the amateur Volyn regional league with Votrans Lutsk. Malysh would help the club in securing the league title during the 2019-20 season. In 2020, he played with FC Kovel-Volyn.

== Honors ==
FC Ukraine United

- Canadian Soccer League First Division: 2018
