= Roman Datsiuk =

Ukrainian footballer

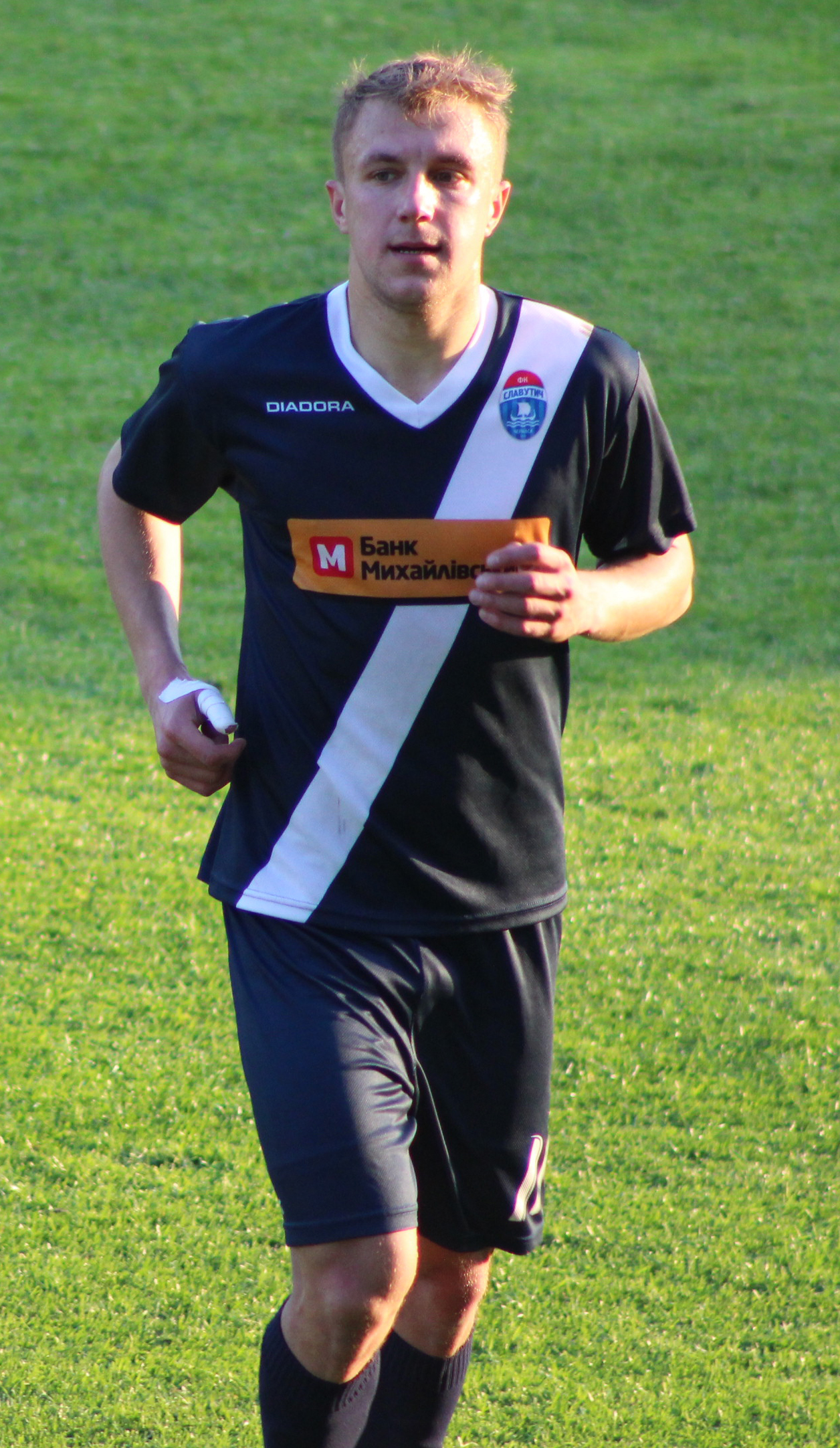
- Datsiuk in 2014

Personal information
- Full name: Roman Mikhailovich Datsiuk
- Date of birth: 7 September 1988 (age 38)
- Place of birth: Kostopil, Soviet Union
- Position: Midfielder

Youth career
- Ізотоп-РАЕС (Вараш)

Senior career*
Years	Team	Apps	(Gls)
2007–2010	Horizon Kostopil		
2011–2014	Slavutych Cherkasy	80	(21)
2014–2015	Stal Dniprodzerzhynsk	11	(0)
2015–2016	Hirnyk Kryvyi Rih	16	(2)
2016–2017	Bukovyna Chernivtsi	11	(3)
2016–2017	Ternopil	14	(1)
2018	Ukraine United	15	(7)
2019	Malynsk		
2019–2020	Svitanok-Agrosvit		
2020–2021	Nyva Terebovlya		
2021	Votrans Lutsk		
2021–2022	Nyva Terebovlya		
- * Club domestic league appearances and goals as of 11 August 2019

Roman Datsiuk (born September 7, 1988) is a Ukrainian footballer.

== Club career ==
=== Ukraine ===
Datsiuk played at the futsal level initially in 2008 with Ukrainian side Rivne Cardinal and later abroad in Poland with TPG Polkowice.

He began playing at the outdoor level in 2007 in the Ukrainian Football Amateur League with FC Horizon Kostopil. In 2012, he joined the professional ranks by signing with Slavutych Cherkasy of the Ukrainian Second League. He would re-sign with Cherkasy the following season. During the 2013-14 season, he helped the club reach the semi-finals of the 2013–14 Ukrainian Cup where they faced Shakhtar Donetsk. He would conclude the season with 13 goals in 30 appearances. The 2014-15 season marked his third year with Slavutych. His final stint with the club ended during the winter transfer market where his contract with the organization was terminated.

After three seasons in the Ukrainian third tier, he made his debut in the Ukrainian First League with Stal Dniprodzerzhynsk in the winter of 2015. In his debut season with Stal, he helped the club in securing promotion to the Ukrainian top division. He would remain in the second division the following season by signing with Hirnyk Kryvyi Rih. His tenure with Hirnyk would last only a single season as he was released during the summer transfer market.

His final season in the Ukrainian second division was during the 2016-17 campaign, where he secured a deal with Bukovyna Chernivtsi. Datsiuk tenure with the western Ukrainian side was short-lived as he departed during the winter transfer market. He appeared in 11 matches and scored 3 goals for Bukovyna. In the winter of 2017, he played the remainder of the season with FC Ternopil. At the conclusion of the season, Ternopil was relegated to the third division. In total, he played in 14 matches and scored 1 goal.

=== Canada ===
In the summer of 2018, he went abroad to play in the Canadian Soccer League with FC Ukraine United. He would help the club in securing the divisional title and a playoff berth. In the preliminary round of the postseason, the western Toronto side defeated Brantford Galaxy in a penalty shootout. The club would be eliminated from the competition in the next round by Scarborough SC. He would finish with 7 goals throughout the 2018 campaign.

=== Return to Ukraine ===
After a season abroad he returned to the Ukrainian Football Amateur League to play with FC Malynsk. Later in 2019, Datsiuk played for Svitanok-Agrosvit Shlyakhova. In 2020, he played for Nyva Terebovlya. He left in April 2021. He then had a spell at Votrans Lutsk before returning to Nyva Terebovlya later in 2021.

== Honors ==
FC Ukraine United

- Canadian Soccer League First Division: 2018
