= Andriy Bandrivskyi =

Ukrainian footballer (born 1985)

Personal information
- Full name: Andriy Ihorovych Bandrivskyi
- Date of birth: 9 March 1985 (age 41)
- Place of birth: Mykolaiv, Ukrainian SSR, Soviet Union
- Position: Goalkeeper

Senior career*
Years	Team	Apps	(Gls)
2002–2004	FC Karpaty-3 Lviv	5	(0)
2004–2005	FC Karpaty-2 Lviv	10	(0)
2005–2006	FC Zhytychi Zhytomyr	12	(0)
2007	FC Hirnyk Kryvyi Rih	16	(0)
2008	FC Lviv	7	(0)
2008	FC Arsenal Bila Tserkva	0	(0)
2009–2010	FC Enerhetyk Burshtyn	21	(0)
2011	FC Sambir	22	(0)
2012	FC Rukh Vynnyky	7	(0)
2013	SCC Demnya	12	(0)
2018–	FC Ukraine United		
- * Club domestic league appearances and goals as of 9 December 2018

Andriy Bandrivskyi (Ukrainian: Андрій Бандрівський; born 9 March 1985) is a professional Ukrainian football goalkeeper who plays for FC Ukraine United in the Canadian Soccer League.

== Playing career ==
=== Ukraine ===
Bandrivskyi played in the Ukrainian Second League with FC Karpaty-3 Lviv in 2002, and later with FC Karpaty-2 Lviv in 2004. In 2005, he had stints with FC Zhytychi Zhytomyr, and later with FC Hirnyk Kryvyi Rih . After several seasons in the Ukrainian Second League he ultimately in 2008 played in the Ukrainian Premier League with FC Lviv. The following season he played with FC Arsenal Bila Tserkva, and later in the Ukrainian First League with FC Enerhetyk Burshtyn in 2009. He later played in the Ukrainian Football Amateur League with FC Sambir, FC Rukh Vynnyky, and SCC Demnya.

=== Canada ===
In 2018, he played abroad in the Canadian Soccer League with FC Ukraine United. In his debut season in Toronto he assisted in securing the First Division title. In his sophomore season he participated in the CSL Championship final against Scarborough SC, but in a losing effort.
