= Vladimir Koval =

Ukrainian footballer (born 1975)

Personal information
- Full name: Vladimir Romanovich Koval
- Date of birth: February 28, 1975 (age 51)
- Place of birth: Lviv, Ukraine SSR, Soviet Union
- Position: Midfielder

Senior career*
Years	Team	Apps	(Gls)
1992–1993	FC Hazovyk Komarno	6	(0)
1995	Toronto Italia		
1996–1997	Toronto Croatia		
1998	Mississauga Eagles P.S.C.		
1999	Toronto Croatia		
2000	North York Astros		
2001	Toronto Croatia		
2007–2014	FC Ukraine United		

Managerial career
- 2013–: FC Ukraine United (director)
- * Club domestic league appearances and goals

Vladimir Romanovich Koval (Ukrainian: Володимир Романович Коваль or Владимир Романович Коваль; born February 28, 1975) is a Ukrainian former footballer, and co-founder of FC Ukraine United of the Canadian Soccer League.

As a player Koval initially began his professional career in Ukraine, where he later emigrated to Canada in the 1990s. Abroad he played in the Canadian National Soccer League (CNSL) notably with Toronto Italia, and Toronto Croatia. He continued playing in the CNSL's successor league the Canadian Professional Soccer League until 2001 with Toronto Croatia. In 2007, he co-founded FC Ukraine United, and fielded the team in the Ontario Soccer League. After securing the necessary capital in 2016 the club was granted a franchise in the Canadian Soccer League.

In 2023, Koval was selected to represent Team Canada at the 2023 FIFG Footgolf World Cup.

== Playing career ==
Koval attended Karpaty Lviv Soccer Academy and began his professional career with FC Hazovyk Komarno in the Ukrainian Second League. In 1995, he went abroad to Canada to play with Toronto Italia in the Canadian National Soccer League. In 1996, he signed with Toronto Croatia and played in the Canadian International Soccer League (Puma League). In 1998, he played with the Mississauga Eagles P.S.C. of the Canadian Professional Soccer League. He made his debut for the club on May 31, 1998 against York Region Shooters.

In 1999, he returned to Toronto Croatia and made his return on June 7, 1999 against St. Catharines Wolves. The following season he signed with North York Astros. He returned to play with Croatia for the 2001 season. In 2007, he played in the Ontario Soccer League for FC Ukraine United.

== Administrative career ==
In 2007, Koval along with Evgen Ishchak, and Andrei Malychenkov formed FC Ukraine United in order to accommodate and combine talent from the former Soviet Union located in Canada. The club originally played at the indoor level at the Soccer City, and ultimately entered the Ontario Soccer League. Originally he primarily served as the general manager, vice president, and occasionally as a footballer. The organization managed to win several accolades, and secure promotion to the Premier Central Division.

In 2016, the club acquired the necessary funds in order to apply for a franchise in the Canadian Soccer League. The club successfully made the transition to the professional level after receiving approval from the league ownership at the annual general meeting of team owners. In 2018, he served in the capacity of an assistant coach to Malychenkov. Since the club's entry into the professional realm the team has secured the First Division title in 2018, and the Second Division championship in 2017.

== Honors ==
Toronto Croatia

- CISL Championship (1): 1996
