= Taras Hromyak =

Ukrainian footballer (born 1993)

Personal information
- Full name: Taras Olehovych Hromyak
- Date of birth: 19 March 1993 (age 33)
- Place of birth: Ternopil Oblast, Ukraine
- Height: 1.91 m (6 ft 3 in)
- Position: Midfielder

Senior career*
Years	Team	Apps	(Gls)
2013–2015	Ternopil	23	(0)
2015	Kalush	14	(4)
2015–2017	Ternopil	31	(3)
2017–2018	FC Ukraine United	25	(23)
2019–2020	Nyva Terebovlia	29	(6)
2021–	Ahron Velyki Hayi		
- * Club domestic league appearances and goals

Taras Hromyak (Ukrainian: Тарас Олегович Гром'як; born March 19, 1993) is a Ukrainian footballer who plays as a midfielder for FC Ahron Velyki Hayi.

== Club career ==
=== Early career ===
Hromyak initially played with FC Ternopil's reserve squad in the Ternopil local circuit. He would join the professional ranks by signing with the senior team that competed in the Ukrainian Second League during the 2013-14 season. In his debut season, he helped the club secure a promotion to the Ukrainian First League. He was re-signed by Ternopil the following season, where he made his debut in the country's second-tier league. Throughout the season, he also debuted in the 2014–15 Ukrainian Cup against Oleksandriya.

Following his stint at the professional level, he returned to the amateur ranks by playing in the Ivano-Frankivsk Oblast Football Federation region with Kalush in 2013.

He returned to Ternopil in the summer of 2015 to play in the second-tier league. In the 2015-16 national cup tournament, Hromyak helped the club reach the third round, where Premier League side Shakhtar Donetsk eliminated them.

=== Canada ===
In the summer of 2017, he played abroad in the southern Ontario-based Canadian Soccer League with FC Ukraine United. In his debut season with the Western Toronto side, he helped the team win the league's second division title. He also finished as the division's top goal scorer with 15 goals. In the second round of the playoffs, the club faced Brantford Galaxy II, where Ukraine United successfully advanced to the championship finals. Hromyak was featured in the championship final match, where he contributed two goals against Burlington SC to secure the title for the club.

In 2018, he re-signed with Ukraine United and played in the league's first division. He helped the club secure the divisional title and, as a result, clinched a playoff berth. However, the Toronto side was eliminated from the postseason competition in the second round by Scarborough SC. He would also finish as the club's second-highest goal scorer with 8 goals.

=== Ukraine ===
In 2019, he returned to the Ukrainian Amateur Football League to play for Nyva Terebovlia. In 2021, he began playing in the Ternopil regional league for Ahron-Velyki Hayi and was named the region's best player. The following season, Hromyak received an injury that ruled him out for the majority of the campaign. Throughout his time with Ahron-Velyki Hayi, he helped the club win the regional title for four consecutive seasons. In 2023, while winning the Ternopil title, he was named the region's best player for the second time in his career. Ahron-Velyki Hayi also competed in the national amateur league, where Hromyak finished as the league's top scorer. The following season, he finished second in the goal-scoring charts.

== Honors ==
FC Ahron-Velyki Hayi

- Ternopil Football Championship: 2023, 2024

FC Ukraine United

- CSL II Championship: 2017
- Canadian Soccer League First Division: 2018
- Canadian Soccer League Second Division: 2017

Individual

- Canadian Soccer League Second Division top scorer: 2017
- Ukrainian Football Amateur League top scorer: 2023–24
