= Radivoj Panić =

Serbian footballer and coach

Personal information
- Date of birth: January 8, 1975 (age 51)
- Place of birth: Gornje Košlje, SFR Yugoslavia
- Position: Midfielder

Senior career*
Years	Team	Apps	(Gls)
1998–2000	Beograd		
2000–2003	Sartid Smederevo	56	(3)
2005–2007	INON		
2007	PKB Padinska Skela		
2007–2008	Kolubara		
2008–2010	Srem Jakovo		
2018–2019	Waterloo Region		

Managerial career
- 2018–2019: SC Waterloo Region
- * Club domestic league appearances and goals

Radivoj Panić (born January 8, 1975) is a Serbian former footballer who played as a midfielder, and is a football manager.

== Playing career ==
Panic played with FK Beograd, FK Zemun, and FK Obilić. In 2001, he played in the First League of FR Yugoslavia with Sartid Smederevo, where he featured in the 2001 UEFA Intertoto Cup against Dundee F.C., and TSV 1860 Munich. In 2018, he was assigned the player-coach for SC Waterloo Region in the Canadian Soccer League.
