= Vladimir Zelenbaba =

Serbian footballer (born 1982)

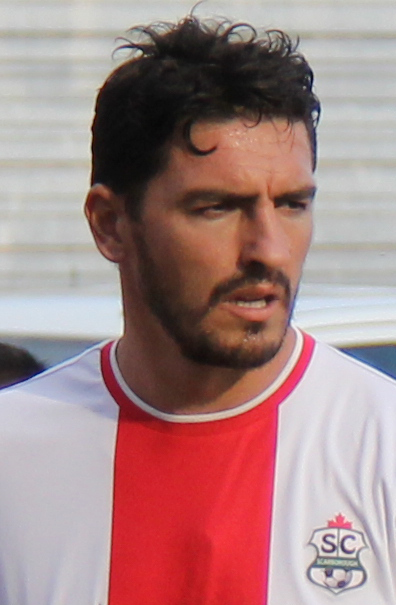
- Zelenbaba in 2022

Personal information
- Date of birth: February 6, 1982 (age 44)
- Place of birth: Knin, SR Croatia, SFR Yugoslavia
- Height: 1.92 m (6 ft 4 in)
- Positions: Midfielder; forward

Senior career*
Years	Team	Apps	(Gls)
2001–2002	Železničar Beograd		
2003–2005	Hajduk Lemic		
2006	Radnički Pirot		
2006	Inđija		
2007–2008	Zorya Luhansk	6	(0)
2008	Kaisar Kyzylorda	12	(2)
2009	Ordabasy Shymkent	22	(0)
2010	Zemun	3	(0)
2011	Kapaz	10	(0)
2012–2015	Waterloo	74	(10)
2014–2015	→ Travnik (loan)	3	(0)
2015–2016	Bangkok		
2016–2017	Balkan Mirijevo	9	(5)
2017–2019	Waterloo		
2020–2024	Scarborough		
- * Club domestic league appearances and goals

Vladimir Zelenbaba (Serbian Cyrillic: Владимир Зеленбаба, pronounced [ʋlǎdimiːr zelêɱbaba]; born February 6, 1982) is a Serbian retired footballer who played as a midfielder.

== Career ==
=== Serbia ===
Zelenbaba began his career in the Second League of FR Yugoslavia with Železničar Beograd. In 2003, he moved to league rivals Hajduk Beograd, where the club won their division, which secured promotion to the First League of Serbia and Montenegro. Following his stint with Hajduk, he signed with Radnički Pirot for the 2006 season. He would further resume his career in the second tier by signing with Inđija.

=== Ukraine ===
In 2007, he went abroad to play with Zorya Luhansk in the 2006–07 Ukrainian Premier League. He made his debut for the club on March 11, 2007, against Karpaty Lviv. Throughout his debut season in Luhansk, he appeared in six matches. In the winter of 2007, he was placed on the transfer list. Before he departed from the club, he made an appearance in the 2007–08 Ukrainian Cup.

=== Central Asia ===
After his brief stint in Ukraine, he went to Kazakhstan to play for Kaisar in the Kazakhstan Premier League. He remained in the first division the following season by signing with rivals Ordabasy. Following his two-year stint in Central Asia, he returned to the Serbian second division to sign with Zemun in 2010. He would appear in 3 matches with Zemun. In 2011, he went to the southern Caucasus region to play for Kapaz PFK in the Azerbaijan Premier League. In total, he played in 10 matches and departed from the club after one season.

=== Waterloo ===
In 2012, he went overseas to North America to sign with SC Waterloo Region in the Canadian Soccer League. He re-signed with Waterloo for the 2013 season. He managed to reach the CSL Championship final with Waterloo, where they defeated Kingston FC, with Zelenbaba contributing two goals.

After the conclusion of the CSL season, he played the winter months in Europe with Travnik of the Premier League of Bosnia and Herzegovina. Throughout his stint with Travnik, he featured in 3 matches. He departed from Travnik after a single season to return to Waterloo. In 2015, he made his second championship final appearance, where Waterloo was defeated by Toronto Croatia.

Following a short absence from Waterloo, he returned for the 2017 season. He re-signed with Waterloo for the 2018 season and featured in the opening round of the playoffs, where he recorded a goal against the Serbian White Eagles, which advanced the club to the next round. The club was eliminated in the second round by FC Vorkuta.

The 2019 season marked his final year with the club, where he helped the team secure a postseason berth by finishing third in the First Division. In the preliminary round of the 2019 playoffs, Waterloo would defeat the Serbs in a penalty shootout. Their playoff journey ended in the next round after a defeat by FC Ukraine United.

=== Asia ===
For the 2016 season, Waterloo was temporarily relegated to the league's second division, and as a result, Zelenbaba returned to Asia to play with Bangkok F.C. of the Thai Division 1 League. After a brief stint in Thailand, he returned to Serbia to join Balkan Mirijevo.

=== Scarborough ===
In 2020, he signed with Scarborough SC. In his debut season with Scarborough, he assisted in securing the league's first division title and featured in the championship final against FC Vorkuta, but they were defeated by a score of 2–1. He featured in the ProSound Cup final in 2021 against Vorkuta but was defeated in a penalty shootout. He won his second championship title by assisting Scarborough in defeating Vorkuta in the 2021 playoffs.

Zelenbaba re-signed with the eastern Toronto side for this third season. He helped the club secure a postseason berth by finishing third throughout the regular season. In the opening round of the playoffs, he contributed a goal against BGH City FC, which helped advance the club to the next round. He played in Scarborough's run to the championship final, which the eastern Toronto side lost to FC Continentals (formerly FC Vorkuta).

The 2023 campaign marked his fourth season with the organization. He would go on to win his second regular-season title with Scarborough. In 2024, he participated in the Royal CSL Cup final, where the Serbian White Eagles defeated them. Throughout the regular season, the club finished as runners-up to the Serbs.

== Managerial career ==
In 2016, he was the head coach for the FK Voždovac U-13 team. He was a player-coach in 2017 for SC Waterloo Region and became associated with ProStars FC as an academy coach.

== Honors ==
SC Waterloo Region

- CSL Championship: 2013
- CSL Championship runner-up: 2015

Scarborough SC

- CSL Championship: 2021
- Canadian Soccer League First Division/Regular Season: 2020, 2023
- Canadian Soccer League Royal CSL Cup runner-up: 2024
