= Pavlo Lukyanets =

Ukrainian footballer

Personal information
- Full name: Pavlo Yuryovych Lukyanets
- Date of birth: 8 February 1988 (age 38)
- Place of birth: Kyiv, Ukraine SSR, Soviet Union
- Position: Forward

Senior career*
| Years | Team | Apps | (Gls) |
| 2005–2006 | FC Volyn Lutsk | 25 | (9) |
| 2005–2009 | FC Obolon' Kyiv | 22 | (0) |
| 2005–2009 | FC Obolon-2 Kyiv | 58 | (4) |
| 2008–2009 | FC Nafkom Brovary | 10 | (0) |
| 2009–2011 | FC Nyva-V Vinnytsia | 59 | (3) |
| 2011–2012 | FC Avanhard Kramatorsk | 9 | (1) |
| 2012–2013 | FC Helios Kharkiv | 0 | (0) |
| 2013–2015 | FC Obolon' Kyiv | 29 | (2) |
| 2015–2016 | FC Enerhiya Nova Kakhovka | 13 | (1) |
| 2016 | FC Sudnobudivnyk Mykolaiv | 2 | (0) |
| 2017–2019 | FC Ukraine United | 25 | (18) |
- * Club domestic league appearances and goals as of 28 September 2019

Pavlo Lukyanets (born February 8, 1988) is a Ukrainian former footballer who played as a forward.

== Club career ==
=== Ukraine ===
Lukyanets began playing at the youth level with Dynamo Kyiv and Volyn Lutsk. He would join the professional ranks by signing with Obolon' Kyiv in the Ukrainian First League in 2006. In his debut season at the professional level, he played in 18 matches. During his tenure in Kyiv, he also played in the Ukrainian Second League with Obolon's reserve squad. After five seasons in Kyiv, he returned to the country's third tier to play with FC Nafkom Brovary. Following a brief stint with Nafkom, he signed with Nyva-V Vinnytsia, where he won the 2009–10 Ukrainian League Cup.

Within the same season, the club achieved promotion to the First League but was relegated in the 2011-12 season. After the relegation of Vinnytsia, he played in the third division with Avanhard Kramatorsk. His stint with Avanhard was rather brief as he departed from the club after the conclusion of the season. Lukyanets returned to the second division the following year by securing a deal with Helios Kharkiv.

He returned to his former club Obolon Kyiv in 2013. In his second stint with Obolon, he helped the club secure the Shchanov Memorial Cup. After a season in Kyiv, he became a free agent following his release from the club. He later had stints with Enerhiya Nova Kakhovka and FC Sudnobudivnyk Mykolaiv.

=== Canada ===
In the summer of 2017, he went abroad to play in the southern Ontario-based Canadian Soccer League with FC Ukraine United in the league's second division. In his debut season with the western Toronto side, he assisted the team in securing the divisional title. Lukyanets finished second in the scoring charts with 6 goals. In the second round of the playoffs, the club faced Brantford Galaxy II, where he contributed a hat-trick to advance Ukraine United to the championship finals. Lukyanets would appear in the championship final, where Toronto would defeat Burlington SC.

In 2018, he re-signed with Ukraine United and played in the league's first division. He would help the club secure the divisional title and, as a result, clinch a playoff berth. However, the Toronto side was eliminated from the postseason in the second round by Scarborough SC.

Lukyanets returned for his third season in 2019. He would aid the club in securing another playoff berth by finishing third in the top division. The club successfully defeated Hamilton City in the opening round of the postseason. Ukraine United found further success in the semifinals as they defeated SC Waterloo Region to reach the championship final. Lukyanets would participate in the CSL Championship final against Scarborough, where the western Toronto side was defeated by a score of 2-0.

== Honors ==
FC Nyva-V Vinnytsia

- Ukrainian League Cup: 2009-2010

FC Ukraine United

- CSL II Championship: 2017
- Canadian Soccer League First Division: 2018
- CSL Championship runner-up: 2019
