= Yevhen Falkovskyi =

Ukrainian footballer

Personal information
- Full name: Yevhen Mykhaylovych Falkovskyi
- Date of birth: 5 February 1982 (age 44)
- Place of birth: Ukrainian SSR, Soviet Union
- Position: Forward

Senior career*
Years	Team	Apps	(Gls)
2001	Inter Boyarka	5	(0)
2002	Systema-KKhP Cherniakhiv	14	(0)
2003	Elektrometalurh-NZF Nikopol	4	(0)
2005	Mykolaiv	9	(0)
2005	FC Zhitichi	3	(0)
2006–2007	Enerhiya Yuzhnoukrainsk	26	(3)
2010–2011	Enerhiya Nova Kakhovka	21	(9)
2011	Krymteplytsia Molodizhne	16	(2)
2012–2014	UkrAhroKom Holovkivka	63	(14)
2015–2016	Myr Hornostayivka	27	(5)
2016–2017	Krystal Kherson	18	(7)
2017–2018	FC Ukraine United	13	(7)
2019	FC Khleborob Nyzhni Torhai	6	(4)
- * Club domestic league appearances and goals as of June 24 2019

Yevhen Falkovskyi (born 5 February 1982) is a former Ukrainian footballer who played as a forward.

== Club career ==
=== Ukraine ===
Falkovskyi began his career in 2001 with Inter Boyarka in the Ukrainian Second League. Throughout his time in the Second League, he played with Systema-KKhP Cherniakhiv, Elektrometalurh-NZF Nikopol, Mykolaiv, FC Zhitichi, Enerhiya Yuzhnoukrainsk.

He had another stint at the amateur level in 2008, where he won the Kherson regional title with Sigma Kherson.

For the 2010-11 season, he spent the season in the Kherson region with Enerhiya Nova Kakhovka, where he finished as the club's top goal scorer with 9 goals. The following season, he played in the Ukrainian First League with Krymteplytsia Molodizhne. In his debut season in the second division, he appeared in 17 matches and scored 2 goals.

After a season in the second tier, Falkovskyi returned to the country's third-tier league by securing a contract with UkrAhroKom Holovkivka. In his debut season with Holovkivka, he helped the club secure promotion by winning their group. He was re-signed by Holovkivka the next season, which marked his second run in the second division. In total, he played 22 matches and recorded 2 goals throughout the season.

He returned to the third division for the 2015-16 season to sign with Myr Hornostayivka. In his debut season with Myr, he appeared in 26 matches and scored 5 goals. The next season, he remained in the southern Ukraine region and played for Krystal Kherson.

=== Canada ===
In the summer of 2017, he played abroad in the Canadian Soccer League's second division with FC Ukraine United. In his debut season with the Western Toronto side, he assisted the team in securing the divisional title. In the second round of the playoffs, the club faced Brantford Galaxy II, where he contributed two goals that helped advance the team to the championship finals. He would appear in the championship final match against Burlington SC, where he also recorded a goal that secured the title for the club.

Falkovskyi re-signed with Ukraine United the following season in the league's first division. He would help the club secure the divisional title and, as a result, clinching a playoff berth. The club would be eliminated in the second round of the playoffs by Scarborough SC. He would finish the season with 7 goals.

=== Return to Ukraine ===
In 2019, he returned to Ukraine to play in the Ukrainian Football Amateur League with FC Khleborob Nyzhni Torhai. He played in the Mykolaiv amateur regional level with Hliborob, where he was named the tournament's best player.

== Honors ==
FC UkrAhroKom Holovkivka

- Ukrainian Second League: 2012-2013

FC Ukraine United

- CSL II Championship: 2017
- Canadian Soccer League First Division: 2018
