= Uroš Vidović =

Serbian footballer

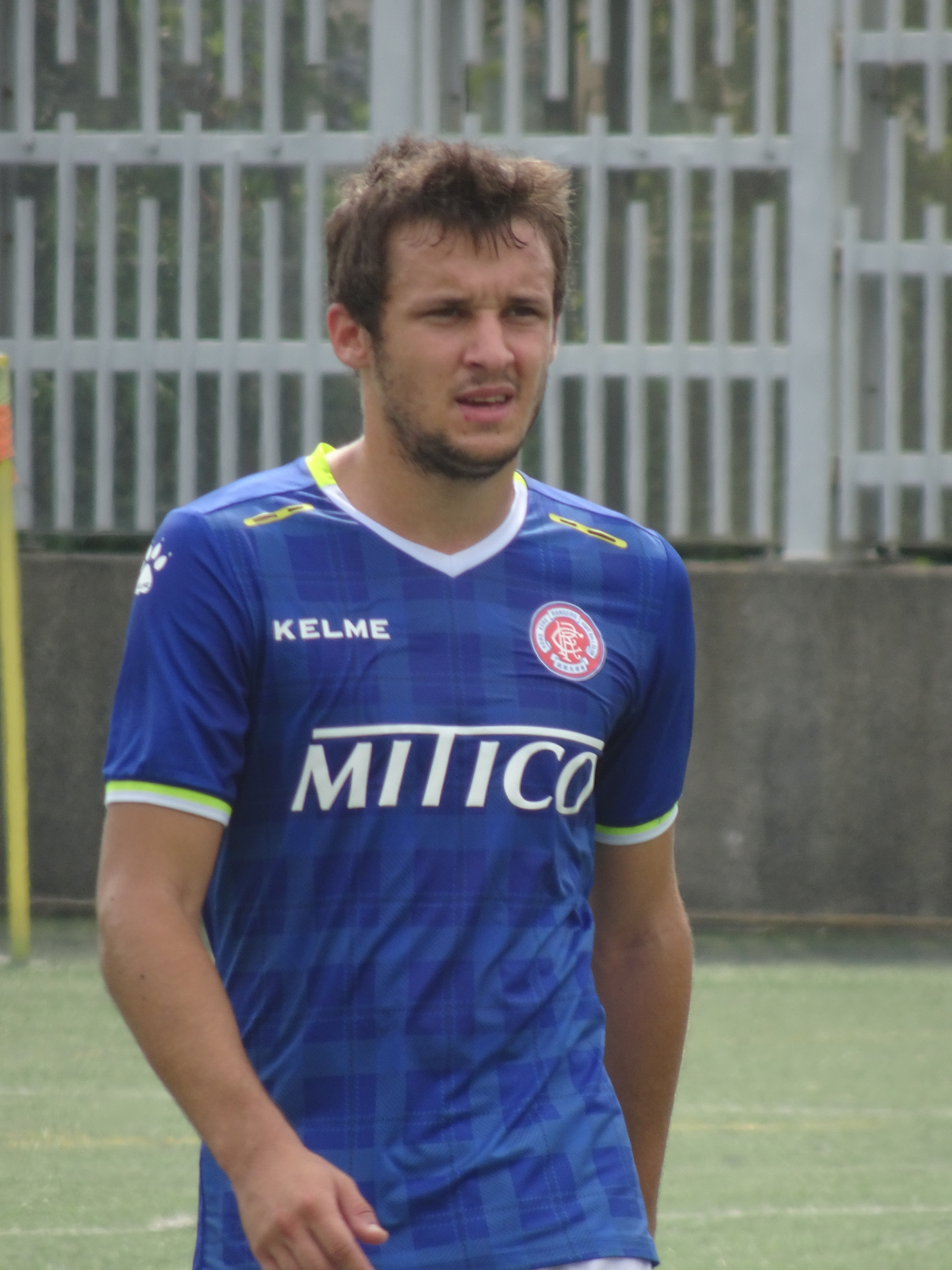
- Vidović with Hong Kong Rangers in 2018

Personal information
- Full name: Uroš Vidović
- Date of birth: 9 June 1994 (age 32)
- Place of birth: Kragujevac, FR Yugoslavia
- Height: 1.76 m (5 ft 9 in)
- Position: Midfielder

Team information
- Current team: OFK Napredak Markovac

Youth career
- Radnički Kragujevac

Senior career*
Years	Team	Apps	(Gls)
2013–2018	Radnički Kragujevac	110	(2)
2013–2015	→ Pobeda Beloševac (loan)	17	(0)
2018–2019	Hong Kong Rangers	25	(7)
2019–2024	Radnički Kragujevac	72	(0)
2024	Takovo		
2025-	OFK Napredak Markovac		
- * Club domestic league appearances and goals as of 2 September 2024

Uroš Vidović (Serbian Cyrillic: Урош Видовић; born 9 June 1994) is a Serbian professional footballer.

== Honours ==
Radnički Kragujevac

- Serbian League West: 2016–17
