= Steve Brown Sports Complex =

Sports facility in Brantford, Ontario

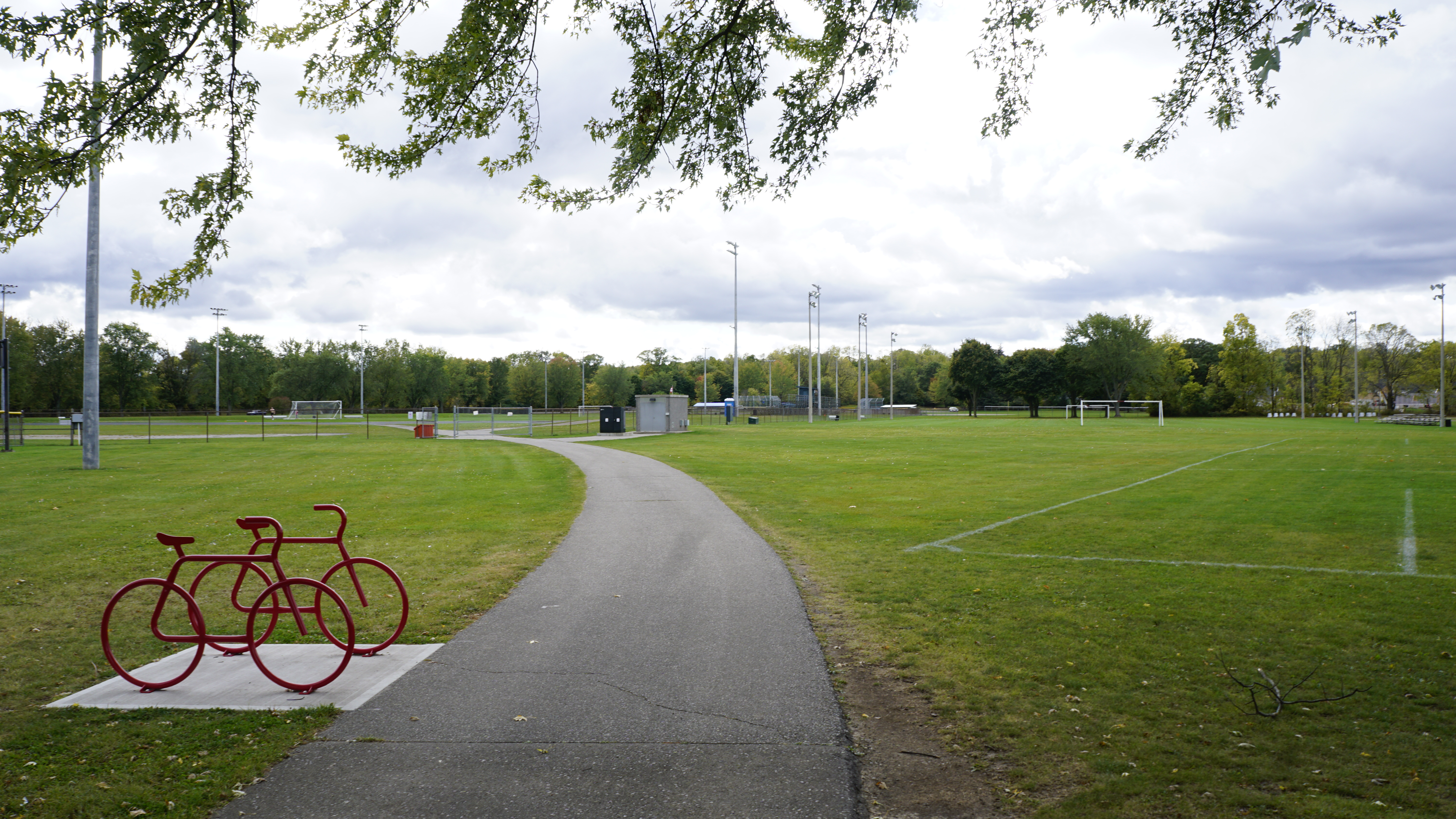
- Interactive map of Steve Brown Sports Complex
- Full name: Steve Brown Sports Complex at Lions Park
- Location: Brantford, Ontario
- Coordinates: 43°7′17.7″N 80°16′12.7″W
- Owner: City of Brantford
- Capacity: 2000
- Surface: Grass

Construction
- Built: 1972

Tenant
- Brantford Galaxy (CSL) (2010-present)

Steve Brown Sports Complex is a multi-purpose outdoor sports facility in Brantford, Ontario and located at Lions Park on 20 Edge Street. Built original in 1972 as Lions Park arena, which included a banquet hall for community purposes. Later expanded to include a track field with several baseball and soccer fields with a seating capacity of 2000. In 2002, the exterior part of the facility was renamed in honor of community leader and organizer Steve Brown. In 2010, the facility was upgraded in order to serve as the home venue to the Canadian Soccer League's newest franchise the Brantford Galaxy.
