= Nazar Milishchuk =

Ukrainian footballer

Personal information
- Full name: Nazar Hennayovych Milishchuk
- Date of birth: 5 June 1986 (age 40)
- Place of birth: Dubliany, Ukrainian SSR, Soviet Union
- Height: 1.84 m (6 ft 0 in)
- Position: Forward

Senior career*
Years	Team	Apps	(Gls)
2009–2011	Enerhetyk Burshtyn	34	(1)
2011	Sambir	29	(8)
2012	Mykolaiv	25	(9)
2012–2013	Stal Dniprodzerzhynsk	0	(0)
2014	Mykolaiv	19	(4)
2014–2015	Sawa Sonina	3	(0)
2015	Mykolaiv	3	(2)
2015	Veres Rivne	4	(0)
2015	Cresovia Krzeczowice	2	(2)
2016	Wólczanka Wólka Pełkińska	13	(1)
2016–2017	Mykolaiv	8	(2)
2018–2019	Ukraine United	33	(13)
2021	Ukraine United		
- * Club domestic league appearances and goals

Nazar Milishchuk (born June 5, 1986) is a Ukrainian former footballer who played as a midfielder.

== Playing career ==
=== Ukraine ===
Milishchuk originally began playing at the amateur level with local teams such as Naftusya Skhidnytsia. in 2009, he joined the professional ranks by playing in the Ukrainian First League with Enerhetyk Burshtyn. In his debut season with Burshtyn, he appeared in 28 matches and scored 1 goal. After two seasons in the second tier, he departed from Burshtyn in 2011 after his contract expired. Following his departure from Burshtyn, he returned to the Ukrainian Football Amateur League to play with FC Sambir.

His tenure with Sambir was short-lived as he signed with Mykolaiv in 2012. In his debut season with Mykolaiv, he finished as the club's top goal scorer with 9 goals and was named the organization's best player of the year. He would return to the country's second division league in 2012 to sign with Stal Dniprodzerzhynsk but failed to make an appearance. Milishchuk made a brief return to Mykolaiv in 2014 but suffered an injury that limited his playing time.

=== Poland ===
In 2014, he went abroad to play in the Polish IV liga with Sawa Sonina. Following the club's relegation, he departed after the conclusion of the season.

He returned to Poland in 2015 to play for Klasa A club Cresovia Krzeczowice in 2015, before moving to III liga side Wólczanka Wólka Pełkińska in early 2016.

=== Return to Ukraine ===
After a season in Poland, he returned to the professional football scene in Ukraine by playing in the third division with Veres Rivne. He made his debut for Veres on July 22, 2015, against Arsenal Kyiv in the 2015–16 Ukrainian Cup. In total, he would play in 3 league matches with the club. Milishchuk would return to his former club Mykolaiv in late 2016 where he was named the Lviv Oblast's player of the year.

=== Canada ===
In 2018, he went abroad for the third time in his career to play in the southern Ontario-centered Canadian Soccer League with FC Ukraine United. In his debut season with the western Toronto side, he finished second in the scoring charts for the club with 8 goals. He also helped the club secure a playoff berth by winning the First Division title. In the preliminary round of the playoffs, Ukraine United successfully advanced to the semifinal round after defeating Brantford Galaxy. Scarborough SC would eliminate Ukraine United in the semifinal round.

Milishchuk re-signed with Ukraine United for another season in 2019. He would once more help the club in securing a playoff berth by finishing third in the league's top division. Ukraine United would defeat Hamilton City in the opening round of the postseason tournament. In the second round, Milishchuk would contribute a goal against SC Waterloo Region which advanced the Toronto side to the CSL Championship final. He would participate in the championship final match where Scarborough defeated Ukraine United.

He would return to play with Ukraine United for the 2021 season in the Ontario Soccer League.

== Honors ==
FC Ukraine United

- Canadian Soccer League First Division: 2018
- CSL Championship runner-up: 2019
