= 2018 Canadian Soccer League season =

Professional soccer league season

Canadian Soccer League First Division
- Season: 2018
- Dates: May 13 – September 26 (regular season); September 29 – October 13 (playoffs)
- Champions: FC Ukraine United (First Division regular season); FC Vorkuta (First Division playoffs, 1st title)
- Matches: 72
- Goals: 276 (3.83 per match)
- Top goalscorer: Sani Dey (13)
- Biggest home win: FC Ukraine United 10–2 CSC Mississauga (September 23)
- Biggest away win: SC Waterloo Region 0–9 FC Ukraine United (June 30); CSC Mississauga 0–9 Hamilton City SC (July 27)
- Longest winning run: 6 matches FC Ukraine United
- Longest unbeaten run: 10 matches FC Ukraine United

The 2018 Canadian Soccer League season was the 21st season under the Canadian Soccer League name. The season began on May 13, 2018, and concluded on October 13, 2018, with the CSL Championship final held at Centennial Park Stadium in Toronto, Ontario. FC Vorkuta won their first championship by defeating Scarborough SC in a penalty shootout. Vorkuta found further success in the Second Division by winning their first CSL double after defeating Halton United in the finals. Meanwhile FC Ukraine United claimed the First Division title.

The First Division saw an increase to 9 teams, while the Second Division decreased in size to 6 teams. The First Division returned to the territories of Hamilton, Mississauga, and the promotion of FC Ukraine United. While new entries to the Second Division included the return of Milton SC and the debut of Scarborough SC's reserve squad.

== Summary ==
=== Championship race ===
The main narrative of the season was the race for the First Division title between FC Ukraine United and FC Vorkuta. The outcome was determined on the final match of the season with Ukraine United edging Vorkuta out with a higher goal differential by five goals. Though Vorkuta would achieve success in the postseason by claiming its first CSL Championship. The organization made further advances in the Second Division as its reserve squad secured the double (division title and DII Championship). In preparation for the season, Vorkuta managed to secure Ukraine United's general manager Denys Yanchuk and continued in the club's practice of foreign recruitment from the Ukrainian football market.

After producing a perfect season in the Second division Ukraine United returned to the top division in 2018. Andrei Malychenkov resumed his coaching duties and retained the majority of his previous roster with additional imports from Ukraine. From the onset of the season, the club remained highly competitive and battled with rivals Vorkuta for supremacy of the division. Vorkuta held the top position for sixteen consecutive weeks until Ukraine United usurped the position for the final five weeks of the season. The western Toronto team ultimately reached the second round of the playoffs and succumbed to Scarborough SC.

=== Playoff contention ===
The third position in the First Division was a highly contested spot with Hamilton City, Scarborough SC, Serbian White Eagles, and SC Waterloo Region competing with one another. The White Eagles achieved a five-game undefeated streak and held the spot for two weeks. Shortly their performance dwindled and fluctuated between the fourth and fifth position to conclude the season in the sixth spot. Following their mediocre 2017 season SC Waterloo named Radivoj Panić as the head coach, and assembled a roster with a mixture of league veterans with European imports from the Western Balkans. After a slow start to the season, the club rebounded to a seven-match undefeated streak and secured the third position on the final match of the regular season.

Scarborough SC continued to develop as an elite club with Zoran Rajović being assigned head coach responsibilities. Rajović took advantage of the influx of European imports to the league, and a player agreement to acquire talent from York Region Shooters was negotiated. One notable re-signing was the return of Canadian international Adrian Cann as team captain. The acquisitions produced dividends for the eastern Toronto club as they held the coveted third position for the majority of the season for a total of sixteen weeks until forfeiting it on the final week to Waterloo on an account of a greater goal difference. In the postseason the club reached the championship final for the second consecutive season.

After a year of hiatus from the league, Hamilton City returned under new management with Saša Vuković as owner and head coach. The club experienced a transitional stage with fewer imports from abroad and more reliance on talent from their previous reserve team. Hamilton managed to produce an average season enough to secure a playoff berth with just four points away from the third position.

=== Other teams ===
The final two postseason berths were secured by Brantford Galaxy and SC Real Mississauga. After the departure of Vukovic, the Galaxy brought in Milan Prpa as head coach and the team assembled by Prpa remained primarily the same as the previous seasons with many veterans returning.

The season also witnessed the return of professional soccer to the Peel Region with CSC Mississauga and SC Real Mississauga representing the city of Mississauga. Real Mississauga, an academy founded by league veteran Krum Bibishkov, received a franchise in the CSL. They primarily competed with Brantford throughout the season and secured a playoff berth. CSC Mississauga struggled to make an impact as they remained at the bottom of the standings for the majority of the season. In the Second Division, Burlington SC was renamed Halton United and were the primary competitors to FC Vorkuta B. For eleven weeks Halton retained the second position and reached the championship final.

== First Division ==
=== Changes from 2017 ===
Club membership increased in the First Division from eight members to nine. Changes included the return of FC Ukraine United from the Second Division with further new additions from two Mississauga franchises CSC Mississauga and Real Mississauga SC. The division also saw the return of Hamilton City SC from its one-year hiatus under new club management. The York Region Shooters failed to feature an active squad for the season as owner Tony De Thomasis became involved with Unionville Milliken SC.

=== Teams ===
Team	City	Stadium	Manager
Brantford Galaxy	Brantford, Ontario	Heritage Field Turf	Milan Prpa
CSC Mississauga	Mississauga, Ontario	Iceland Soccer Field	Silvester Trograncic
FC Ukraine United	Toronto, Ontario (Etobicoke)	Centennial Park Stadium	Andrei Malychenkov
FC Vorkuta	Vaughan, Ontario (Woodbridge)	Ontario Soccer Centre	Samad Kadirov
Hamilton City	Hamilton, Ontario (Stoney Creek)	Heritage Field Turf	Saša Vuković
SC Real Mississauga	Mississauga, Ontario	Paramount Fine Foods Centre	Krum Bibishkov
Scarborough SC	Toronto, Ontario (Scarborough)	Birchmount Stadium	Zoran Rajović
Serbian White Eagles	Toronto, Ontario (Etobicoke)	Centennial Park Stadium	Milan Mijailović
SC Waterloo Region	Waterloo, Ontario (Eastbridge)	RIM Park	Radivoj Panić

Location of First Division teams outside of Toronto for the 2018 CSL season.
First Division
Location of First Division teams in Toronto for the 2018 CSL season.
First Division

=== Standings ===
Pos	Team	Pld	W	D	L	GF	GA	GD	Pts	Qualification
1	FC Ukraine United (C)	16	12	2	2	60	16	+44	38	Playoffs
2	FC Vorkuta (O)	16	12	2	2	55	16	+39	38	Playoffs
3	SC Waterloo Region	16	9	2	5	34	33	+1	29	Playoffs
4	Scarborough SC	16	8	5	3	34	20	+14	29	Playoffs
5	Hamilton City	16	8	1	7	41	38	+3	25	Playoffs
6	Serbian White Eagles	16	5	4	7	20	20	0	19	Playoffs
7	SC Real Mississauga	16	3	2	11	14	42	−28	11	Playoffs
8	Brantford Galaxy	16	3	2	11	9	37	−28	11	Playoffs
9	CSC Mississauga	16	1	2	13	9	37	−28	5	

Source: []
Rules for classification: 1) points; 2) goal difference; 3) number of goals scored.
(C) Champions; (O) Play-off winners

=== Positions by Round ===
Team ╲ Round	1	2	3	4	5	6	7	8	9	10	11	12	13	14	15	16	17	18	19	20	21
Brantford Galaxy	3	3	4	8	4	5	6	6	6	7	7	7	8	8	8	8	7	8	7	7	8
CSC Mississauga	4	4	5	7	8	8	8	8	8	9	9	9	9	9	9	9	9	9	9	9	9
FC Ukraine United	2	2	2	2	2	2	2	2	2	2	2	2	2	2	2	2	1	1	1	1	1
FC Vorkuta	1	1	1	1	1	1	1	1	1	1	1	1	1	1	1	1	2	2	2	2	2
Hamilton City SC	5	9	9	6	7	7	5	5	4	5	5	4	4	4	4	5	6	6	6	5	5
SC Real Mississauga	6	5	7	9	9	9	9	9	9	6	8	6	6	7	7	7	8	7	8	8	7
Scarborough SC	7	8	3	4	5	3	3	3	3	3	3	3	3	3	3	3	3	3	3	3	4
SC Waterloo Region	8	6	8	5	6	6	7	7	7	8	6	8	7	6	6	6	5	4	4	4	3
Serbian White Eagles	9	7	6	3	3	4	4	4	5	4	4	5	5	5	5	4	4	5	5	6	6

Updated to match(es) played on September 27, 2018. Source:

=== Season Statistics ===
==== Goals ====
Rank	Player	Club	Goals
1	(Ghana) Sani Dey	Hamilton City SC	13
2	(Ukraine) Pavlo Lukyanets	FC Ukraine United	12
3	(Ukraine) Serhiy Ivlyev	FC Vorkuta	11
4	(Serbia) Aleksandar Stojiljković	Scarborough SC	10
5	(Jamaica) Kavin Bryan	Scarborough SC	9
6	(Ukraine) Taras Hromyak	FC Ukraine United	8
6	(Ukraine) Nazar Milishchuk	FC Ukraine United	8
6	(Ukraine) Serhiy Ursulenko	FC Vorkuta	8
7	(Canada) Hammud Ali Atif	Scarborough SC	7
7	(Ukraine) Roman Datsiuk	FC Ukraine United	7
7	(Ukraine) Yevhen Falkovskyi	FC Ukraine United	7
7	(Ukraine) Ihor Malysh	FC Ukraine United	7
7	(Ukraine) Yaroslav Solonynko	FC Vorkuta	7

==== Hat-tricks ====
Player	Club	Against	Result	Date
(Serbia) Aleksandar Stojiljković	Scarborough SC	Hamilton City SC	5–1 (H)	27 May 2018
(Ukraine) Sergiy Ivliev	FC Vorkuta	SC Waterloo Region	6–1 (H)	9 June 2018
(Ukraine) Yevhen Falkovskyi	FC Ukraine United	SC Waterloo Region	0–9 (A)	30 June 2018
(Ukraine) Pavlo Lukyanets	FC Ukraine United	SC Waterloo Region	0–9 (A)	30 June 2018
(Ghana) Sani Dey	Hamilton City SC	CSC Mississauga	0–9 (A)	27 July 2018
(Slovenia) Timotej Zakrajsek	Hamilton City SC	CSC Mississauga	0–9 (A)	27 July 2018
(Ghana) Sani Dey	Hamilton City SC	Serbian White Eagles	3–4 (A)	3 August 2018
(Jamaica) Kavin Bryan	Scarborough SC	Hamilton City SC	4–4 (A)	18 August 2018
(Ukraine) Taras Hromyak	FC Ukraine United	SC Real Mississauga	8–1 (H)	18 August 2018
(Ukraine) Sergiy Ivliev	FC Vorkuta	Hamilton City SC	1–5 (A)	16 September 2018
(Ukraine) Vadym Hostyev	FC Vorkuta	Brantford Galaxy	5–0 (H)	20 September 2018
(Ukraine) Pavlo Lukyanets	FC Ukraine United	CSC Mississauga	10–2 (H)	23 September 2018

=== Playoffs ===
==== Quarterfinals ====
September 29, 2018	Scarborough SC	4–1	Hamilton City SC	Toronto, Ontario
17:00	Angel Angelov 33'; Atif Hammud Ali 42'; Knežević 60'; Radaković 70'	Report	Peter Aleksic 46'	Stadium: Birchmount Stadium

September 29, 2018	SC Waterloo Region	2–1 (a.e.t.)	Serbian White Eagles	Waterloo, Ontario
19:30	Miodrag Kovacevic 19'; Zelenbaba 115' (pen.)	Report	Pešić 90'	Stadium: RIM Park

September 30, 2018	FC Ukraine United	0–0 (a.e.t.) (8–7 p)	Brantford Galaxy	Toronto, Ontario
16:00		Report		Stadium: Centennial Park Stadium

September 30, 2018	FC Vorkuta	2–1	SC Real Mississauga	Vaughan, Ontario
19:00	Melnyk; Solonynko	Report	Bibishkov	Stadium: Ontario Soccer Centre

==== Semifinals ====
October 6, 2018	FC Vorkuta	2–2 (a.e.t.) (4–3 p)	SC Waterloo Region	Vaughan, Ontario
19:00	Hostyev 45'; Ursulenko 117'	Report	Miodrag Kovacevic 42'; Sven Arapovic	Stadium: Ontario Soccer Centre

October 7, 2018	FC Ukraine United	1–2	Scarborough SC	Toronto, Ontario
14:00	Malysh 89'	Report	Bryan 68'; Stojiljkovic 91'	Stadium: Centennial Park Stadium

==== CSL Championship ====
October 13, 2018	FC Vorkuta	1–1 (a.e.t.) (6–5 p)	Scarborough SC	Toronto, Ontario
15:00	Halchuk 29'	Report	Simpson 77'	Stadium: Centennial Park Stadium; Referee: Marcos Jaramillo

== Second Division ==
Canadian Soccer League Second Division
- Season: 2018
- Champions: FC Vorkuta B (Second Division regular season); FC Vorkuta B (Second Division playoffs, 1st title)
- Matches: 45
- Goals: 242 (5.38 per match)
- Top goalscorer: Kristijan Kezic (12)
- Biggest home win: Halton United 13–0 Serbian White Eagles B (June 16)
- Biggest away win: Serbian White Eagles B 1–12 FC Vorkuta B (May 25)

=== Changes from 2017 ===
The Second Division decreased in size to six-member as FC Ukraine United was promoted to the First Division, and Royal Toronto FC became inactive for the season. SC Waterloo B, London City were disbanded, and Milton SC returned to the Second Division. Another new entry was through Scarborough SC as they began operating a reserve team for the first time. Other changes included the renaming of Burlington SC to Halton United.

=== Teams ===
Team	City	Stadium	Manager
Brantford Galaxy B	Brantford, Ontario	Steve Brown Sports Complex	Tomo Dancetovic
FC Vorkuta B	Vaughan, Ontario	St. Robert S.S. Field	
Halton United	Burlington, Ontario	Norton Park	
Milton SC	Milton, Ontario	Milton Sports Centre	Suad Tihak
Scarborough SC B	Toronto, Ontario	Ontario Soccer Centre	Eddy Coronel
Serbian White Eagles B	Toronto, Ontario	Centennial Park Stadium	Goran Bakoc

Location of Second Division teams outside of Toronto for the 2018 CSL season.
Second Division
Location of Second Division teams in Toronto for the 2018 CSL season.
Second Division

=== Standings ===
Pos	Team	Pld	W	D	L	GF	GA	GD	Pts	Qualification
1	FC Vorkuta B (C, O)	15	12	1	2	71	20	+51	37	Playoffs
2	Halton United	15	10	0	5	48	20	+28	30	Playoffs
3	Scarborough SC B	15	8	0	7	48	40	+8	24	Playoffs
4	Milton SC	15	7	0	8	37	50	−13	21	Playoffs
5	Brantford Galaxy B	15	5	1	9	25	32	−7	16	
6	Serbian White Eagles B	15	2	0	13	13	80	−67	6	

Source: http://canadiansoccerleague.ca/2018-second-division-standings/
Rules for classification: 1) points; 2) goal difference; 3) number of goals scored.
(C) Champions; (O) Play-off winners

=== Positions by Round ===
Team ╲ Round	1	2	3	4	5	6	7	8	9	10	11	12	13	14	15	16	17
Brantford Galaxy B	3	4	5	5	4	4	4	4	3	3	3	3	4	4	4	5	5
Halton United	7	3	4	3	3	3	2	2	2	2	2	2	2	2	2	2	2
FC Vorkuta B	1	1	1	1	1	1	1	1	1	1	1	1	1	1	1	1	1
Milton SC	5	5	3	4	5	5	5	6	6	5	5	5	5	5	5	3	4
Scarborough SC B	2	2	2	2	2	2	3	3	4	4	4	4	3	3	3	4	3
Serbian White Eagles B	8	6	6	6	6	6	6	5	5	6	6	6	6	6	6	6	6

Updated to match(es) played on September 25, 2018. Source:

=== Top Goal Scorers ===
Rank	Player	Club	Goals
1	(Croatia) Kristijan Kezic	FC Vorkuta B	12
2	(Bosnia and Herzegovina) Marko Mitrušić	Milton SC	10
3	(Ukraine) Valery Yarmosh	FC Vorkuta B	8
4	(Canada) Matthaus Garcia	SC Scarborough B	6
4	Geoff Martinez	Halton United	6
4	(Ukraine) Dmytro Polyuhanych	FC Vorkuta B	6
4	(Canada) Drilon Salihu	Halton United	6
5	(Guyana) Ryan Khedoo	Scarborough SC B	5
5	(Canada) Adriano Marques	Halton United	5
5	(Ukraine) Serhiy Melnyk	FC Vorkuta B	5
5	(Canada) Christian Truyen	Halton United	5
5	(Serbia) Vladimir Vujovic	Milton SC	5

=== Playoffs ===
==== Semifinals ====
October 6, 2018	FC Vorkuta B	3–1	Brantford Galaxy B	Vaughan, Ontario
15:00	Kristijan Kezic 8', 45'; Antonenko 90'	Report	Donart Beqiri 17'	Stadium: St. Roberts S.S Field

October 9, 2018	Halton United	3–1	Scarborough SC B	Burlington, Ontario
21:00	Christian Truyen 11', 63'; Karl Manzi 47'	Report	Edgar Oswaldo 31'	Stadium: Norton Park

==== Second Division Championship ====
October 13, 2018	FC Vorkuta B	3–2	Halton United	Toronto, Ontario
13:00	Kristijan Kezic 14', 71'; Melnyk 15'	Report	Christian Truyen 13'; Robert Melo 35'	Stadium: Centennial Park Stadium

== Awards ==
=== Weekly awards ===
Week	CSL Player of the Week		Reference
Week	Player	Club	Reference
Week 1	Alesandar Stojiljkovic	Scarborough SC	
Week 2	Sergei Ivliev	FC Vorkuta	
Week 3	Timotej Zakrajsek	Hamilton City SC	

Week	CSL Team of the Week		Reference
Week	Club	Division	Reference
Week 1	FC Ukraine United	First Division	
Week 2	FC Vorkuta	First Division	
Week 3	SC Real Mississauga	First Division	
