= RIM Park =

City park in Waterloo, Ontario, Canada

RIM Park is a 500-acre (2.0 km^{2}) city park facility offering both outdoor and indoor amenities on the northeast side of the city of Waterloo, Ontario, Canada, near the Eastbridge neighbourhood. Key facilities and features include the Manulife Financial Sportsplex and Healthy Living Centre, the heritage Elam Martin farmstead, The Benchwarmer sports bar, and the Grey Silo Golf Course. The eastern edge of the park borders on the Grand River for 1.5 km, and the park grounds have about 7 km (4.3 mi) of asphalt trail loops.

In the planning stages, the multi-amenity park had been called Millennium Recreation Park, however the name RIM Park was chosen to acknowledge the large contributions from its primary donor, the employees of Research In Motion (RIM) (doing business as BlackBerry Limited since January 2013), who contributed $2 million in 2001. The up-front cost of building the park was $56.7-million, most of which was financed by a lease-style loan. Parts of the park opened in June 2001, and the grand opening was held on November 3, 2001.

== Indoor Sporting Complex ==
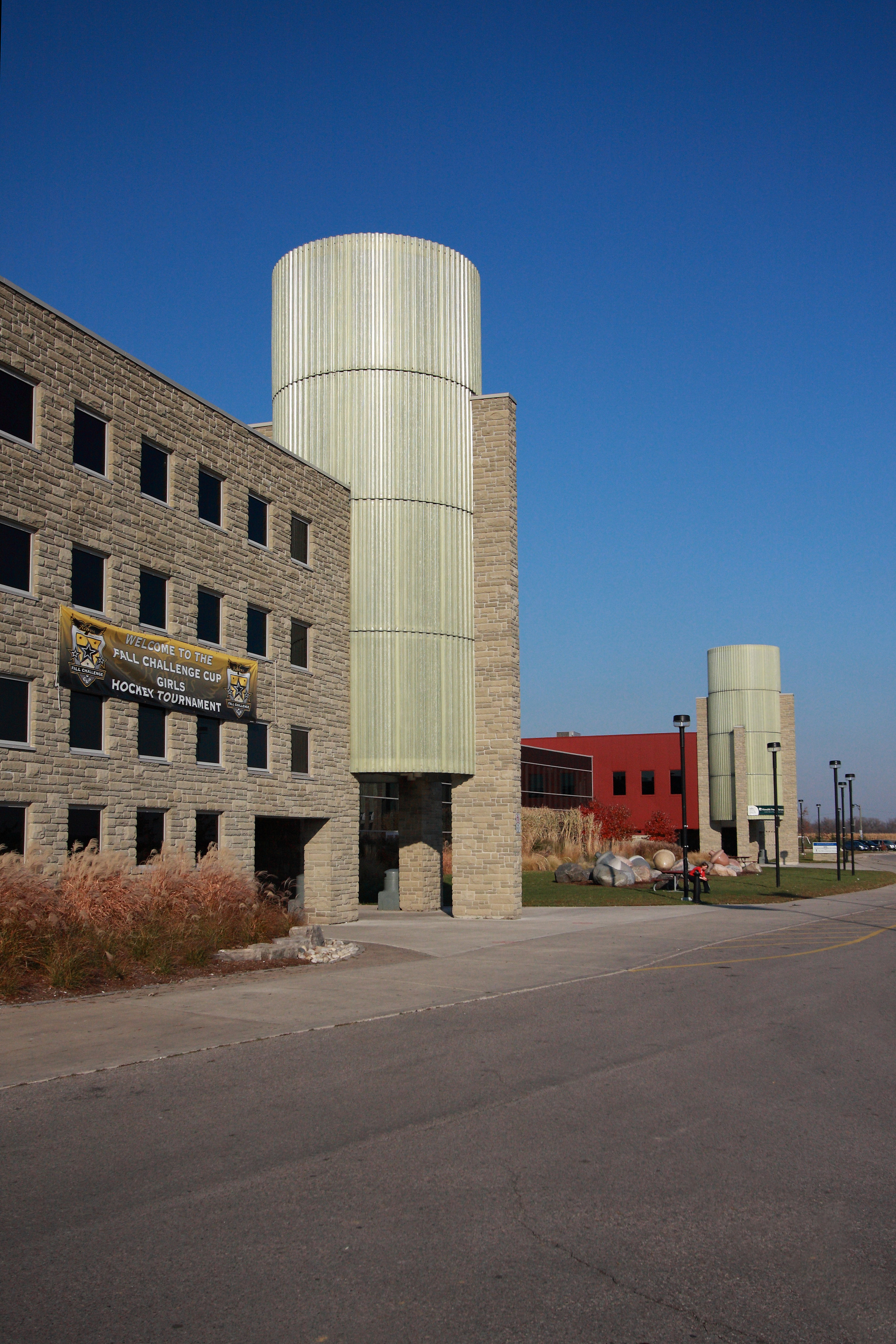
Manulife Financial Sportsplex

RIM Park's indoor multi-use recreation facility is called the Manulife Sportsplex and Healthy Living Centre, and is funded by Manulife Financial. Facilities in the complex include 4 rinks, 1 field, 2 gymnasiums, and 1 stage.

=== Ice Rinks ===
RIM Park's Sportsplex houses 4 Olympic-sized ice pads with 36 large players' dressing rooms, and 6 officials' dressing rooms with showers. For hosting indoor events, the rinks are covered and have a 1000-person capacity per rink.

== Amenities ==
=== Food and Beverage ===
RIM Park is home to The Benchwarmer (a full-service restaurant and sports bar), The Dugout (the main concession, featuring a variety of fast-service spots that offer beverages, snacks, full meals, and treats), and On the Go (quick snacks and warm beverages). For events, RIM Park also offers catering services and custom packages.

=== Waterloo Sports Medicine Clinic ===
The Waterloo Sports Medicine Clinic (WSM) has been in operation since 1986, with one location at the University Square Plaza, and their other location opening in 2001 at RIM Park. WSM has served over 100,000 clients, and offers custom foot orthotics, massage therapy, occupational therapy, physiotherapy, pilates training, sport biomechanical analysis, sports nutrition, and sports psychology.

=== Waterloo Public Library Eastside Branch ===
The Eastside Branch Public Library opened on May 7, 2022. As the newest branch of the Waterloo Public Library system, it includes computers, 3D printers, recording rooms, a gamerspace, a program room, two study rooms, a makerspace, and an outdoor naturespace.

== Outdoor Sports Facilities ==
There are 22 outdoor sporting facilities at RIM Park: 12 multi-purpose fields with nighttime field lighting (including 2 international-sized artificial turf fields and 4 natural grass fields), 6 official ball diamonds with fencing and portable bleacher seating, and 4 sand beach-volleyball courts. These facilities received funding from the Waterloo Minor Soccer Club. The outdoor area has a playground, player benches, spectator seating, a pavilion, washrooms, accessible parking, and a one-kilometre walking/running loop.

== Environment ==
There are two main ecological areas that the RIM Park land encompasses: an east floodplain, and a west upland system; since both of these environments are regularly disturbed, they provide an ideal habitat for weedy, invasive, non-native species. This type of intact, native floodplain community is an increasingly vanishing and thereby valued ecosystem.

=== GreenLab ===
The City of Waterloo's GreenLab pavilion is located at RIM Park's outdoor sport-field facilities. The project teaches people about environmental best practices with a demonstration featuring RIM Park's water harvesting system that stores water underneath one of the astro-turf fields to water the four natural-grass fields, and is commonly used for class field-trips.

=== Water Harvesting System ===
The water harvesting system is a strategy contrived by the City of Waterloo to conserve water at RIM Park by collecting storm water underneath one of the artificial astro-turf fields and using this water to maintain the four natural-grass fields for competitive play.

=== Trails ===
RIM Park grounds offer about 7 km (4.3 mi) of asphalt trail loops partially alongside the Grand River. The trails also access the Walter Bean Trail.

== Heritage ==
RIM Park is situated amidst two of Waterloo's key heritage points. The perimeter of the Park's area borders the Grand River, which was designated as a heritage river in 1994 due to its centrality in the agricultural and industrial settlement of Ontario by European settlers. RIM Park gives Waterloo area residents and tourists direct access to 1.5 km (about 1 mile) of the Grand River along the eastern perimeter of the Park.

RIM Park is also home to a sixth-generation Mennonite farm house, called the Elam Martin farmstead. The Elam Martin Farmstead was constructed in ~1820, and was purchased by The City of Waterloo in 1999 as part of a long-term heritage preservation plan. The property is currently located on about 4.5 hectares (11 acres) of land incorporated into RIM Park.

== Funding controversy ==
The park is notorious in local politics due to the cost of its financing. A Mississauga-based company, MFP Financial Services (now Renasant Financial Partners) provided financing for the park. On September 25, 2000, Waterloo council unanimously approved a lease-style loan of $48.3 million after being told that the interest rate was 4.73 per cent, and the total payout over 30 years was $112.9 million. More than six months after the deal closed, after an investigation by The Record, the city found out that the real interest rate was 9.2 per cent and that its total payout would be $227.7 million.

In June 2001, the City of Waterloo filed suit against MFP, one of its sales representatives, and two companies that bought part of the debt from MFP: Clarica —now Sun Life Financial—and Maritime Life. The matter was settled out of court in 2002, reducing the city's payments to $145.7 million over 30 years.

A public judicial inquiry was held to look into the funding process, headed by Justice Ronald C. Sills. He issued his report in October 2003, making 31 recommendations.

Not one member of city council during the RIM Park ordeal—including mayor Lynne Woolstencroft—was re-elected in the municipal elections in November 2003. All were either defeated or chose not to run again (Mike Connolly ran for a seat on regional council and was elected; Sean Strickland had run for a seat in the provincial election a month earlier and finished a close second to incumbent Elizabeth Witmer). The city's chief administrative officer and its treasurer both left their jobs as a result of the funding fiasco.
