= FC Ukraine United =

Canadian association football team

- Full name: Football Club Ukraine United
- Founded: 2006
- Stadium: Centennial Park Stadium; Etobicoke, Toronto, Ontario
- Capacity: 2,200
- Owner(s): Evgen Ishchak
- Manager: Evgen Ishchak
- Coach: Evgen Ishchak
- League: Ontario Soccer League
- 2019: Regular season: 3rd Playoffs:Final
- Website: http://www.fcukraineunited.com/
Home colours	Away colours

FC Ukraine United is a Canadian soccer club founded in 2006. Their home venue is located at Centennial Park Stadium in Etobicoke, Toronto, Ontario.

== History ==
In 2006, Yuriy Hlyva, and Vladimir Koval, former professional footballers from the former Soviet Union established a club in order to accommodate and combine talent from the various Eastern European countries located in Canada. As a result, FC Ukraine United were formed with a Ukrainian identity due to the majority of players originating from Ukraine. Malychenkov was given head coach responsibilities, while Koval served as the general manager. In 2007, the club initial began playing indoor soccer at Soccer City. In the spring of 2007, Ukraine United joined the Ontario Soccer League in the Multi Jurisdictional West Division. In their debut season in the OSL the team finished third in the standings and won the George Finnie Cup. The following season United won promotion to the Central Regional Division by winning the league.

During their three seasons in the Central Regional Division the team managed to win the Great Lakes Cup and secured a promotion to the Premier Central Division in 2011. During their time in the Premier Division United participated several times in the Diaspora World Cup hosted in Ternopil, Ukraine, and finished runner's up in the 2015 regular season. In 2016, Ukraine United was promoted to the professional ranks by joining the Canadian Soccer League.

In preparation for play in the CSL First Division Malychenkov recruited several import players with experience in the Professional Football League of Ukraine. Ukraine United made their professional debut on June 5, 2016 against Scarborough SC where they lost by a score of 2–0. On June 12, 2016 United recorded their first victory over Hamilton City SC in a 3–2 victory with goals coming from Ivliev and Derevlov. In their debut season the western Toronto side competed with York Region Shooters over the First Division title and managed to achieve a second-place ranking in the standings and recorded the league's big offensive record.

In the first round of the postseason, Ukraine United faced Brantford Galaxy and with goals coming from Oleksandr Muzychuk, Derevlov, and Shutov they advanced to the semifinals with a 3–0 victory. Their opponents in the next round were the Serbian White Eagles, but were eliminated from playoff contention from a 1–0 loss. For the 2017 season, Ukraine United voluntarily relegated themselves to the Second Division and produced a perfect season. The following season they returned to the First Division, and secured the division title. In 2019, they reached the CSL Championship final, but were defeated by Scarborough SC.

== Players ==
=== Current squad ===
As of October 9, 2021

Note: Flags indicate national team as defined under FIFA eligibility rules; some limited exceptions apply. Players may hold more than one non-FIFA nationality.

No.	Pos.	Nation	Player
-	MF	ISR	Alon Badat
-	GK	UKR	Andriy Bandrivskyy
-	DF		Mikhail Bershov
-	DF	UKR	Vasyl Chornyi
-	DF		Andrei Gapanenko
-	MF		Romario Guma
-	MF		Evgen Ishchak
-	MF		Oleksandr Kaplun
-	MF		Andi Kararaj
-	MF	UKR	Stanislav Katana
-	FW		Geri Kraja
-	MF	UKR	Taras Kryvyi
-	DF	UKR	Ivan Kucherenko
-	MF	UKR	Roman Kukharskyi
-	DF		Yaroslav Maliborsky

No.	Pos.	Nation	Player
-	FW	UKR	Nazar Milishchuk
-	DF	UKR	Volodymyr Plishka
-	FW	UKR	Roman Pitsur
-	FW		Basel Rashrash
-	DF	UKR	Maksym Rohovskyi
-	MF		Novin Saraci
-	DF	UKR	Serhiy Savchenko
-	FW		Serhiy Semenov
-	FW	CAN	Artur Shaparov
-	FW		Ihor Sorotoskyi
-	DF	UKR	Andriy Sukhetskyi
-	FW		Sandor Varga
-	GK		Arthur Zaslavski

== Year-by-year ==
Year	Division	League	Regular season	Playoffs
2007	Multi Jurisdictional Division West	OSL	Third	
2008	Multi Jurisdictional Division West	OSL	Champions	
2009	Central Regional Division	OSL	Eleventh	
2010	Central Regional Division	OSL	Fourth	
2011	Central Regional Division	OSL	Fourth	
2012	Premier Central Division	OSL	Eighth	
2013	Premier Central Division	OSL	Eighth	
2014	Premier Central Division	OSL	Third	
2015	Premier Central Division	OSL	Second	
2016	First Division	CSL	Second	Semifinal
2017	Second Division	CSL	First	Champions
2018	First Division	CSL	First	Semifinal
2019	First Division	CSL	Third	Final
