= 2018 FC Vorkuta season =

FC Vorkuta
2018 season
- Owners: Igor Demitchev; Samad Kadirov
- Head Coach: Samad Kadirov
- Canadian Soccer League: 2nd place (First Division)
- CSL Championship: Champions
- Top goalscorer: Sergiy Ivliev (11 goals)

The 2018 season was FC Vorkuta's second season in the Canadian Soccer League. The club ended their CSL campaign with a club record by securing their first professional championship title in the First Division, and the double in the Second Division. The club qualified for the playoffs for the second consecutive season after finishing second in the First Division. In the postseason Vorkuta defeated the likes of Real Mississauga, and SC Waterloo Region in order to reach the championship final. Their opposition in the finals were Scarborough SC, where Vorkuta claimed their first CSL Championship after a victory in a penalty shootout.

While in the Second Division their reserve team clinched the organization's first division title, and made further achievements in the postseason after winning the championship title against Halton United. The club's top goalscorer for the second consecutive season was Sergiy Ivliev with eleven goals.

== Summary ==
In preparation for the 2018 season the organization selected Denys Yanchuk as the general manager, while Samad Kadirov returned to manage the team. The club continued in recruiting imports from the Ukrainian football market, while retaining their core veterans from the previous season. Their sophomore year within the league produced another successful season by finishing second in the First Division with only a goal differential with FC Ukraine United to separate them from clinching the title. In the opening round of the postseason Vorkuta defeated Real Mississauga, and then followed by a victory over SC Waterloo Region to place them in the championship final. In the finals Vorkuta faced Scarborough SC, and made club history by winning their first CSL Championship in a 6–5 victory in a penalty shootout.

Meanwhile, in the Second Division their reserve team clinched the organization's first division title, and made further history after winning the championship title against Halton United.

== Team ==
=== Roster ===
As of August 18, 2018

Note: Flags indicate national team as defined under FIFA eligibility rules; some limited exceptions apply. Players may hold more than one non-FIFA nationality.

No.	Pos.	Nation	Player
1	GK	UKR	Oleksandr Musiyenko
2	DF	UKR	Volodymyr Bidlovskyi
3	DF	UKR	Lyubomyr Halchuk
4	MF	UKR	Serhiy Ursulenko
7	MF	UKR	Yaroslav Solonynko
8	MF	UKR	Valery Haidarzhi
9	MF	UKR	Oleh Kerchu
10	FW	UKR	Sergiy Ivliev
11	DF	UKR	Vadym Gostiev
13	MF	UKR	Maksym Hramm
18	MF	UKR	Ihor Melnyk
20	MF	UKR	Denis Dyachenko

No.	Pos.	Nation	Player
21	MF		Valery Doroshenko
23	DF	UKR	Oleksandr Volchkov
25	FW	UKR	Oleksandr Lakusta
27	FW	CRO	Krisijan Kezic
29	MF	UKR	Mykhailo Riabyi
33	MF	UKR	Dmytro Polyuhanych
34	DF	UKR	Oleksandr Tarasenko
35	DF		Oleksandr Yaremchuk
41	DF		Bohdan Sluka
42	MF	UKR	Bohdan Riabets
44	GK		Oleksandr Lozinskyy

=== Management ===
Position	Staff
Head coach	Samad Kadirov
Assistant coach	Denys Yanchuk
Manager	Denys Yanchuk
President	Igor Demitchev

Last updated: August 10, 2018
Source: canadiansoccerleague.ca

=== In ===
No.	Pos.	Player	Transferred from	Fee/notes	Source
3	MF	(Ukraine) Volodymyr Bidlovskyi	(Ukraine) FC Rukh Vynnyky	Free Transfer	
4	MF	(Ukraine) Serhiy Ursulenko	(Ukraine) FC Zhemchuzhyna Odesa	Free Transfer	
18	MF	(Ukraine) Ihor Melnyk	(Canada) Toronto Atomic	Free Transfer	
33	MF	(Ukraine) Dmytro Polyuhanych	(Ukraine) FC Skala Stryi	Free Transfer	
35	DF	(Ukraine) Oleksandr Tarasenko	(Poland) JKS 1909 Jarosław	Free Transfer	
42	MF	(Ukraine) Bohdan Riabets	(Ukraine) FC Avanhard Kramatorsk	Free Transfer	

== Competitions ==
=== Preseason ===
March 31	York Region Shooters	3–2	FC Vorkuta	Vaughan, Ontario
	34' West 80'	Report	Dyachenko 20'; Haidarzhi 65'	Stadium: Joan of Arc Turf Field

=== Canadian Soccer League ===
==== First Division ====
Pos	Team	Pld	W	D	L	GF	GA	GD	Pts	Qualification
1	FC Ukraine United (A, C)	16	12	2	2	60	16	+44	38	Qualification for Playoffs
2	FC Vorkuta (A, O)	16	12	2	2	55	16	+39	38	Qualification for Playoffs
3	SC Waterloo Region (A)	16	9	2	5	34	33	+1	29	Qualification for Playoffs
4	Scarborough SC (A)	16	8	5	3	34	20	+14	29	Qualification for Playoffs
5	Hamilton City SC (A)	16	8	1	7	41	38	+3	25	Qualification for Playoffs
6	Serbian White Eagles (A)	16	5	4	7	20	20	0	19	Qualification for Playoffs
7	SC Real Mississauga (A)	16	3	2	11	14	42	−28	11	Qualification for Playoffs
8	Brantford Galaxy (A)	16	3	2	11	9	37	−28	11	Qualification for Playoffs
9	CSC Mississauga	16	1	2	13	9	37	−28	5	

Updated to match(es) played on September 27, 2018. Source: http://canadiansoccerleague.ca/2018-csl-first-division-standings/
Rules for classification: 1) points; 2) goal difference; 3) number of goals scored.
(A) Advance to a further round; (C) Champions; (O) Play-off winners

==== Results summary ====
Overall								Home						Away					
Pld	W	D	L	GF	GA	GD	Pts	W	D	L	GF	GA	GD	W	D	L	GF	GA	GD
16	12	2	2	55	16	+39	38	6	1	1	30	8	+22	6	1	1	25	8	+17

Last updated: September 20, 2018.
Source: 2018 Canadian Soccer League season

==== Results by round ====
Round	1	2	3	4	5	6	7	8	9	10	11	12	13	14	15	16
Ground	A	H	A	H	A	A	H	A	H	H	A	H	H	A	A	H
Result	W	W	D	W	W	W	W	L	W	D	W	W	L	W	W	W

Updated to match(es) played on September 25, 2018. Source: CSL
A = Away; H = Home; W = Win; D = Draw; L = Loss

==== Matches ====
May 13	FC Ukraine United	1–2	FC Vorkuta	Toronto, Ontario
	Chornyi 30'	Report	Lakusta 43'; Kerchu 77'	Stadium: Centennial Park Stadium; Referee: Milomir Tomic

May 19	FC Vorkuta	3–0	Hamilton City SC	Vaughan, Ontario
	Ursulenko 37'; Solonynko 43'; Riabets 80'	Report		Stadium: Ontario Soccer Centre

May 25	Serbian White Eagles	1–1	FC Vorkuta	Toronto, Ontario
	Kyle Stewart 39'	Report	Haidarzhi 49'	Stadium: Centennial Park Stadium; Attendance: 150; Referee: Ihor Bohiy

June 9	FC Vorkuta	6–1	SC Waterloo Region	Vaughan, Ontario
20:00	Ivliev 13', 30', 68'; Melnyk 37'; Riabyi 41'; Ursulenko 58'	Report	Ivan Cutura 60'	Stadium: Ontario Soccer Centre

June 16	SC Waterloo Region	1–3	FC Vorkuta	Waterloo, Ontario
	Volchkov 60' (o.g.)	Report	Solonynko 23', 37'; Ivliev 48'	Stadium: RIM Park

June 23	Brantford Galaxy	0–2	FC Vorkuta	Hamilton, Ontario
20:30		Report	Solonynko 25'; Haidarzhi 90'	Stadium: Heritage Field

June 30	FC Vorkuta	1–0	Serbian White Eagles	Toronto, Ontario
19:00	Riabets 71'	Report		Stadium: Esther Shiner Stadium

July 8	Scarborough SC	3–2	FC Vorkuta	Toronto, Ontario
	Bryan 5', 18'; Atif Hammud Ali 33'	Report	Riabyi 25'; Riabets 38'	Stadium: Birchmount Stadium

July 21	FC Vorkuta	7–1	SC Real Mississauga	Vaughan, Ontario
20:00	Ursulenko 13', 80'; Ivliev 45'; Solonynko 50'; Lakusta 55', 60'; Kerchu	Report	Bibishkov 88'	Stadium: Ontario Soccer Centre

August 4	FC Vorkuta	1–1	Scarborough SC	Toronto, Ontario
19:00	Ursulenko 67'	Report	Atif Hammud Ali 2'	Stadium: Esther Shiner Stadium

August 10	SC Real Mississauga	1–5	FC Vorkuta	Mississauga, Ontario
20:30	Desislav Desislavov 69'	Report	Ursulenko 2'; Solonynko 23'; Ivliev 29'; Bidlovskyi 80'; Yarmosh 87'	Stadium: Paramount Fine Foods Centre

August 18	FC Vorkuta	6–2	CSC Mississauga	Toronto, Ontario
19:00	Tarasenko 2'; Ursulenko 17'; Ivliev 21', 55'; Riabets 45'; Kristijan Kezic 75'	Report	31', 65'	Stadium: Esther Shiner Stadium

September 1	FC Vorkuta	2–3	FC Ukraine United	Toronto, Ontario
19:00	Riabets 27'; Volchkov 74'	Report	Amir Hosic; Savchenko 48'; Bohdanov	Stadium: Esther Shiner Stadium

September 7	CSC Mississauga	0–5	FC Vorkuta	Mississauga, Ontario
21:00		Report	Kerchu 6'; Tarasenko; Solonynko 45'; Melnyk; Yarmosh	Stadium: Iceland Field

September 16	Hamilton City SC	1–5	FC Vorkuta	Hamilton, Ontario
18:30	Stefan Blazic 55'	Report	Haidarzhi; Ivliev,, Kerchu; Riabyi	Stadium: Heritage Field

September 20	FC Vorkuta	5–0	Brantford Galaxy	Toronto, Ontario
21:00	Gostiev 30', 32', 45'; Ivliev 50'; Kristijan Kezic 82'	Report		Stadium: Esther Shiner Stadium

==== Postseason ====
September 30 Quarterfinal	FC Vorkuta	2–1	SC Real Mississauga	Vaughan, Ontario
19:00	Melnyk; Solonynko	Report	Bibishkov	Stadium: Ontario Soccer Centre

October 6 Semifinal	FC Vorkuta	2–2 (a.e.t.) (4–3 p)	SC Waterloo Region	Vaughan, Ontario
19:00	Gostiev 45'; Ursulenko 117'	Report	Miodrag Kovacevic 42'; Sven Arapovic	Stadium: Ontario Soccer Centre

October 13 Final	FC Vorkuta	1–1 (a.e.t.) (6–5 p)	Scarborough SC	Toronto, Ontario
15:00	Halchuk 29'	Report	Odain Omaro Simpson 77'	Stadium: Centennial Park Stadium; Referee: Marcos Jaramillo

===== Second Division =====
Pos	Team	Pld	W	D	L	GF	GA	GD	Pts	Qualification
1	FC Vorkuta B (A, C, O)	15	12	1	2	71	20	+51	37	Qualification for Playoffs
2	Halton United (A)	15	10	0	5	48	20	+28	30	Qualification for Playoffs
3	Scarborough SC B (A)	15	8	0	7	48	40	+8	24	Qualification for Playoffs
4	Milton SC	15	7	0	8	37	50	−13	21	Qualification for Playoffs
5	Brantford Galaxy B (A)	15	5	1	9	25	32	−7	16	
6	Serbian White Eagles B	15	2	0	13	13	80	−67	6	

Updated to match(es) played on September 25, 2018. Source: http://canadiansoccerleague.ca/2018-second-division-standings/
Rules for classification: 1) points; 2) goal difference; 3) number of goals scored.
(A) Advance to a further round; (C) Champions; (O) Play-off winners

==== Results summary ====
Overall								Home						Away					
Pld	W	D	L	GF	GA	GD	Pts	W	D	L	GF	GA	GD	W	D	L	GF	GA	GD
15	12	1	2	71	20	+51	37	5	1	1	28	11	+17	7	0	1	43	9	+34

Last updated: September 20, 2018.
Source: 2018 Canadian Soccer League season

==== Results by round ====
Round	1	2	3	4	5	6	7	8	9	10	11	12	13	14	15
Ground	A	H	H	H	A	A	A	A	A	H	H	H	A	A	A
Result	W	W	L	W	W	W	W	W	W	W	D	W	W	L	W

Updated to match(es) played on September 26, 2018. Source: CSL
A = Away; H = Home; W = Win; D = Draw; L = Loss

==== Matches ====
May 25	Serbian White Eagles B	1–12	FC Vorkuta B	Toronto, Ontario
		Report		Stadium: Centennial Park Stadium

June 3	FC Vorkuta B	4–3	Scarborough SC B	Vaughan, Ontario
		Report		Stadium: St. Roberts S.S Field

June 10	FC Vorkuta B	2–3	Milton SC	Vaughan, Ontario
		Report		Stadium: St. Roberts S.S Field

June 24	FC Vorkuta B	3–1	Halton United	Vaughan, Ontario
	Gostiev; Kristijan Kezic,	Report		Stadium: St. Roberts S.S Field

July 8	Milton SC	2–8	FC Vorkuta B	Milton, Ontario
		Report	Kristijan Kezic, Melnyk,,, Lakusta; Polyuhanych	Stadium: Milton Sports Centre

July 15	FC Vorkuta B	9–1	Serbian White Eagles B	Vaughan, Ontario
		Report		Stadium: St. Roberts S.S Field

July 22	Scarborough SC B	1–5	FC Vorkuta B	Vaughan, Ontario
		Report	Dyachenko; Haidarzhi; Bogdan Khmyzov; Polyuhanych; Yarmosh	Stadium: Joan of Arc Turf Field

August 4	Scarborough SC B	1–7	FC Vorkuta B	Vaughan, Ontario
		Report	Valery Doroshenko; Kristijan Kezic,, Melnyk; Polyuhanych,	Stadium: Joan of Arc Turf Field

August 11	Halton United	0–5	FC Vorkuta B	Burlington, Ontario
		Report	Kristijan Kezic; Polyuhanych, Yarmosh,	Stadium: Norton Park

August 12	FC Vorkuta	3–0	Brantford Galaxy B	Vaughan, Ontario
		Report		Stadium: St. Roberts S.S Field

August 22	FC Vorkuta B	0–0	Brantford Galaxy B	Vaughan, Ontario
		Report		Stadium: St. Roberts S.S Field

August 25	FC Vorkuta B	7–3	Milton SC	Vaughan, Ontario
	Valery Doroshenko; Kristijan Kezic; Melnyk, Polyuhanych,	Report		Stadium: St. Roberts S.S Field

September 9	Brantford Galaxy B	1–3	FC Vorkuta B	Brantford, Ontario
18:00		Report		Stadium: Steve Brown Sports Complex

September 12	Halton United	3–0	FC Vorkuta B	Burlington, Ontario
		Report		Stadium: Norton Park

September 18	Serbian White Eagles B	0–3	FC Vorkuta B	Toronto, Ontario
		Report		Stadium: Centennial Park Stadium

==== Postseason ====
October 6 Semifinal	FC Vorkuta B	3–1	Brantford Galaxy B	Vaughan, Ontario
15:00	Kristijan Kezic 8', 45'; Antonenko 90'	Report	Donare Beqere 17'	Stadium: St. Roberts S.S Field

October 13 Final	FC Vorkuta B	3–2	Halton United	Toronto, Ontario
13:00	Kristijan Kezic 14', 71'; Melnyk 15'	Report	Christian Truyen 13'; Robert Melo 35'	Stadium: Centennial Park Stadium

== Statistics ==
=== Goals and assists ===
Correct as of October 13, 2018

First Division Goals
Pos.	Playing Pos.	Nation	Name	Appearances	Goals
1	FW	(Ukraine)	Sergiy Ivliev	16	11
2	MF	(Ukraine)	Serhiy Ursulenko	14	8
3	MF	(Ukraine)	Yaroslav Solonynko	16	7
4	MF	(Ukraine)	Bohdan Riabets	14	5
5	DF	(Ukraine)	Vadym Gostiev	15	4
6	MF	(Ukraine)	Oleh Kerchu	15	3
6	FW	(Ukraine)	Oleksandr Lakusta	4	3
6	DF	(Ukraine)	Mykhailo Riabyi	16	3
7	MF	(Ukraine)	Valery Haidarzhi	-	2
7	MF	(Ukraine)	Ihor Melnyk	-	2
7	FW	(Croatia)	Krisijan Kezic	-	2
7	DF	(Ukraine)	Oleksandr Tarasenko	-	2
7	MF	(Ukraine)	Valery Yarmosh	-	2
8	MF	(Ukraine)	Volodymyr Bidlovskyi	-	2
8	DF	(Ukraine)	Oleksandr Volchkov	-	2
Total				150	55

Second Division Goals
Pos.	Playing Pos.	Nation	Name	Appearances	Goals
1	FW	(Croatia)	Krisijan Kezic	11	12
2	MF	(Ukraine)	Valery Yarmosh	11	8
3	DF	(Ukraine)	Dmytro Polyuhanych	11	6
4	DF	(Ukraine)	Serhiy Melnyk	7	5
5	DF	(Ukraine)	Vadym Gostiev	6	3
6	MF	(Ukraine)	Denis Dyachenko	3	1
6	MF	(Ukraine)	Valerii Haidarzhi	3	1
Total				59	38
