= 2018 Scarborough SC season =

Scarborough SC
2018 season
- Owner: Angel Belchev
- Head Coach: Zoran Rajović
- Canadian Soccer League: 4th place (First Division)
- CSL Championship: Final
- Top goalscorer: Aleksandar Stojiljković (10 goals)
Home colours	Away colours

The 2018 season was Scarborough SC's fourth season in the Canadian Soccer League. Their season official commenced on May 19, 2018, in an away match against FC Ukraine United. The season proved to be a successful one as Scarborough managed to compete in the top four and ultimately secured a playoff berth by finishing fourth in the First Division. In the postseason tournament Scarborough successfully defeated Hamilton City SC, and FC Ukraine in the earlier rounds in order to reach the CSL Championship final for the second straight season. Their opposition in the finals were FC Vorkuta, but ultimately were defeated in a penalty shootout.

While in the Second Division their reserve team made their debut, and successfully clinched a postseason berth. Their postseason participation came to an early conclusion after a defeat to Halton United. For the second consecutive season Aleksandar Stojiljković finished as the club's top goalscorer with 10 goals.

== Summary ==
In the off season Scarborough negotiated a player agreement with York Region Shooters in order to acquire additional talent as the Shooters ceased operations for the 2018 season. Scarborough also launched their first reserve team in the Second Division under the management of Eddy Coronel. Further notable changes included the return of European journeyman Zoran Rajović in order to operate as a player-coach. As former head coach Krum Bibishkov departed after receiving a franchise in the Canadian Soccer League for his soccer academy SC Real Mississauga. Throughout the season Rajovic managed to secure Scarborough their third consecutive playoff berth by finishing fourth in the standings.

In the preliminary round of the postseason Scarborough defeated Hamilton City SC by a score of 4–1. In the following round Toronto faced division champions FC Ukraine United, and defeated them to reach the finals of the CSL Championship for the second consecutive year. In finals Scarborough faced FC Vorkuta, but were defeated in a penalty shootout. Meanwhile, in the Second Division their reserve squad secured a postseason berth by finishing third. In the playoffs the team faced an early elimination from Halton United.

== Players ==
=== First Division roster ===
As of August 10, 2018

Note: Flags indicate national team as defined under FIFA eligibility rules; some limited exceptions apply. Players may hold more than one non-FIFA nationality.

No.	Pos.	Nation	Player
1	GK	SLE	John Trye
3	DF	SRB	Momcilo Rudan
4	DF	SRB	Stefan Rudan
5	MF	SRB	Zoran Knežević
6	MF		Mirza Colic
7	MF		Stefan Stojiljkovic
8	MF		Milorad Stefanovic
9	MF	BIH	Harris Fazlagic
10	FW	SRB	Aleksandar Stojiljković
12	DF	BIH	Marko Filipović
14	FW		Hammud Ali Atif
15	DF		Stefan Arsenijevic

No.	Pos.	Nation	Player
16	GK	SRB	Milos Djurkovic
17	FW	JAM	Kavin Bryan
18	DF	BUL	Angel Angelov
19	MF	BIH	Zoran Rajović
20	MF	JAM	Odain Omaro Simpson
21	DF		Alen Kucalovic
22	MF	CAN	Mehdi Barati Mahvar
23	DF		Ivan Cendic
30	FW	BUL	Kiril Dimitrov
–	GK	CAN	Adrian Ibanez
–	MF	SRB	Neven Radakovic

=== Second Division roster ===
As of September 19, 2018

Note: Flags indicate national team as defined under FIFA eligibility rules; some limited exceptions apply. Players may hold more than one non-FIFA nationality.

No.	Pos.	Nation	Player
1	GK		Austin Litow-Daye
2	FW	MEX	Amador Torres Castillo
3	MF		Boris Guajardo
5	MF		Muhammet Furkan Demir
6	FW		Darren Khedo
7	MF		Juan Rincon
10	MF		Ivan Prieto
11	DF		Cruz Coronel
12	MF		Aljay Sharkail Wilson
13	FW		Juan Rivera
15	FW	CAN	Ryan Khedoo

No.	Pos.	Nation	Player
16	MF		Adan Rivas
17	MF		Paul McGhie
18	DF		Joshua Mena
19	MF		Dimitri Bannikov
21	DF	MEX	Edgar Oswaldo Osorio
23	DF		Guy Kozi
24	DF		Ricardo Fonseca
25	MF		Mathew Garcia
–	GK		Marlon Moore
–	FW	MEX	Daniel González Vega

=== Management ===
Position	Staff
Head coach	Zoran Rajovic
Assistant coach	Imad Hukara
Reserve head coach	Eddy Coronel
Manager	Kiril Dimitrov
Reserve team manager	Karen Coronel

Last updated: August 10, 2018
Source: canadiansoccerleague.ca

=== In ===
No.	Pos.	Player	Transferred from	Fee/notes	Source
	FW	(Jamaica) Kavin Bryan	(Canada) York Region Shooters	Free Transfer	
	GK	(Canada) Adrian Ibanez	(Canada) York Region Shooters	Free Transfer	
	MF	(Serbia) Zoran Knežević	(Montenegro) OFK Grbalj	Free Transfer	
	MF	(Serbia) Neven Radaković	(Serbia) FK Odžaci	Free Transfer	
	FW	(Bosnia and Herzegovina) Zoran Rajović	(Bosnia and Herzegovina) HNK Orašje	Free Transfer	
	DF	(Serbia) Momčilo Rudan	(Serbia) FK Bratstvo Prigrevica	Free Transfer	
	DF	(Serbia) Stefan Rudan	(Serbia) FK Bratstvo Prigrevica	Free Transfer	
	MF	(Jamaica) Odain Omaro Simpson	(Canada) York Region Shooters	Free Transfer	
	FW	(Mexico) Daniel González Vega	(Mexico) Deportivo Toluca F.C.	Free Transfer	

=== Out ===
No.	Pos.	Player	Transferred to	Fee/notes	Source
	FW	(Bulgaria) Krum Bibishkov	(Canada) SC Real Mississauga	Free Transfer	
	DF	(Canada) Adrian Cann	(Canada) Mississauga MetroStars	Free Transfer	
	DF	(Bulgaria) Metodi Iliev	(Bulgaria) FC Septemvri Simitli	Free Transfer	
	DF	(Canada) Marc Jankovic	(Canada) Master's Futbol	Free Transfer	
	DF	(Bulgaria) Zdravko Karadachki	(Scotland) Edinburgh City F.C.	Free Transfer	
	MF	(Bulgaria) Tihomir Kosturkov	(Bulgaria) FC Septemvri Simitli	Free Transfer	
	FW	(Canada) Joey Melo	(Canada) Master's Futbol	Free Transfer	

== Competitions ==
=== Canadian Soccer League ===
==== First Division ====
Pos	Team	Pld	W	D	L	GF	GA	GD	Pts	Qualification
1	FC Ukraine United (A, C)	16	12	2	2	60	16	+44	38	Qualification for Playoffs
2	FC Vorkuta (A, O)	16	12	2	2	55	16	+39	38	Qualification for Playoffs
3	SC Waterloo Region (A)	16	9	2	5	34	33	+1	29	Qualification for Playoffs
4	Scarborough SC (A)	16	8	5	3	34	20	+14	29	Qualification for Playoffs
5	Hamilton City SC (A)	16	8	1	7	41	38	+3	25	Qualification for Playoffs
6	Serbian White Eagles (A)	16	5	4	7	20	20	0	19	Qualification for Playoffs
7	SC Real Mississauga (A)	16	3	2	11	14	42	−28	11	Qualification for Playoffs
8	Brantford Galaxy (A)	16	3	2	11	9	37	−28	11	Qualification for Playoffs
9	CSC Mississauga	16	1	2	13	9	37	−28	5	

Updated to match(es) played on September 27, 2018. Source: http://canadiansoccerleague.ca/2018-csl-first-division-standings/
Rules for classification: 1) points; 2) goal difference; 3) number of goals scored.
(A) Advance to a further round; (C) Champions; (O) Play-off winners

==== Results summary ====
Overall								Home						Away					
Pld	W	D	L	GF	GA	GD	Pts	W	D	L	GF	GA	GD	W	D	L	GF	GA	GD
16	8	5	3	34	20	+14	29	4	2	2	14	10	+4	4	3	1	20	10	+10

Last updated: September 20, 2018.
Source: 2018 Canadian Soccer League season

==== Results by round ====
Round	1	2	3	4	5	6	7	8	9	10	11	12	13	14	15	16
Ground	A	H	H	A	H	H	A	H	A	H	A	H	A	H	A	A
Result	L	W	L	D	W	W	W	W	W	D	D	L	D	D	W	W

Updated to match(es) played on September 25, 2018. Source: CSL
A = Away; H = Home; W = Win; D = Draw; L = Loss

==== Matches ====
May 19	FC Ukraine United	2–0	Scarborough SC	Toronto, Ontario
	Amir Hosic 74'; Milishchuk 83'	Report		Stadium: Centennial Park Stadium

May 27	Scarborough SC	5–1	Hamilton City SC	Toronto, Ontario
	Stojiljkovic 40', 55', 60', 80'; Dimitrov 70'	Report	Luke Rajain 3'	Stadium: Birchmount Stadium

June 3	Scarborough SC	0–3	FC Ukraine United	Toronto, Ontario
		Report	Lukyanets 64'; Malysh 74'; Amir Hosic 80'	Stadium: Birchmount Stadium

June 8	Serbian White Eagles	0–0	Scarborough SC	Toronto, Ontario
		Report		Stadium: Centennial Park Stadium; Attendance: 150; Referee: Javier Prior

June 17	Scarborough SC	3–0	Brantford Galaxy	Toronto, Ontario
	Bryan 15'; Stojiljkovic 55', 75'	Report		Stadium: Birchmount Stadium

June 24	Scarborough SC	1–0	CSC Mississauga	Toronto, Ontario
20:00	Dimitrov 60'	Report		Stadium: Birchmount Stadium

June 29	CSC Mississauga	0–4	Scarborough SC	Mississauga, Ontario
21:00		Report	Stojiljkovic 5'; Bryan 24', 43'; Dimitrov 70'	Stadium: Iceland Field

July 8	Scarborough SC	3–2	FC Vorkuta	Toronto, Ontario
	Bryan 5', 18'; Atif Hammud Ali 33'	Report	Riabyi 25'; Riabets 38'	Stadium: Birchmount Stadium

July 21	Brantford Galaxy	1–4	Scarborough SC	Hamilton, Ontario
20:30	Dragan Milovic 36'	Report	Hammud Ali Atif 1'; Stojiljković 8', 80'; Alen Kucalovic 45'	Stadium: Heritage Field

July 29	Scarborough SC	1–1	SC Real Mississauga	Toronto, Ontario
20:00	Knežević 55'	Report	Edmond Badal 30'	Stadium: Birchmount Stadium

August 4	FC Vorkuta	1–1	Scarborough SC	Toronto, Ontario
19:00	Ursulenko 67'	Report	Atif Hammud Ali 2'	Stadium: Esther Shiner Stadium

August 12	Scarborough SC	1–3	SC Waterloo Region	Toronto, Ontario
20:00	Dimitrov 57'	Report	Vladimir Stankovic; Mohamed Aborig; Zelenbaba 80'	Stadium: Birchmount Stadium

August 18	Hamilton City SC	4–4	Scarborough SC	Hamilton, Ontario
18:30	Marko Ferlez, Kristian Puljic,	Report	Bryan,, Hammud Ali Atif	Stadium: Heritage Field

September 9	Scarborough SC	0–0	Serbian White Eagles	Toronto, Ontario
20:00		Report		Stadium: Birchmount Stadium

September 15	SC Waterloo Region	1–3	Scarborough SC	Waterloo, Ontario
18:30	Miodrag Kovacevic 3'	Report	Stojiljković 42'; Atif Hammud Ali 86', 89'	Stadium: RIM Park

September 23	SC Real Mississauga	1–4	Scarborough SC	Mississauga, Ontario
20:30		Report		Stadium: Paramount Fine Foods Centre

==== Postseason ====
September 29 Quarterfinal	Scarborough SC	4–1	Hamilton City SC	Toronto, Ontario
17:00	Angel Angelov 33'; Atif Hammud Ali 42'; Knežević 60'; Neven Radaković 70'	Report	Peter Aleksic 46'	Stadium: Birchmount Stadium

October 7 Semifinal	FC Ukraine United	1–2	Scarborough SC	Toronto, Ontario
14:00	Malysh 89'	Report	Bryan 68'; Stojiljkovic 91'	Stadium: Centennial Park Stadium

October 13 Final	FC Vorkuta	1–1 (a.e.t.) (6–5 p)	Scarborough SC	Toronto, Ontario
15:00	Halchuk 29'	Report	Odain Omaro Simpson 77'	Stadium: Centennial Park Stadium; Referee: Marcos Jaramillo

===== Second Division =====
Pos	Team	Pld	W	D	L	GF	GA	GD	Pts	Qualification
1	FC Vorkuta B (A, C, O)	15	12	1	2	71	20	+51	37	Qualification for Playoffs
2	Halton United (A)	15	10	0	5	48	20	+28	30	Qualification for Playoffs
3	Scarborough SC B (A)	15	8	0	7	48	40	+8	24	Qualification for Playoffs
4	Milton SC	15	7	0	8	37	50	−13	21	Qualification for Playoffs
5	Brantford Galaxy B (A)	15	5	1	9	25	32	−7	16	
6	Serbian White Eagles B	15	2	0	13	13	80	−67	6	

Updated to match(es) played on September 25, 2018. Source: http://canadiansoccerleague.ca/2018-second-division-standings/
Rules for classification: 1) points; 2) goal difference; 3) number of goals scored.
(A) Advance to a further round; (C) Champions; (O) Play-off winners

==== Results by round ====
Round	1	2	3	4	5	6	7	8	9	10	11	12	13	14	15
Ground	H	A	H	H	A	H	A	H	A	H	A	A	A	H	H
Result	W	L	W	W	L	L	L	L	L	W	W	L	W	W	W

Updated to match(es) played on September 26, 2018. Source: CSL
A = Away; H = Home; W = Win; D = Draw; L = Loss

==== Matches ====
May 26	Scarborough SC B	3–1	Halton United	Vaughan, Ontario
		Report		Stadium: Joan of Arc Turf Field

June 3	FC Vorkuta B	4–3	Scarborough SC B	Vaughan, Ontario
		Report		Stadium: St. Roberts S.S Field

June 10	Scarborough SC B	4–2	Brantford Galaxy B	Vaughan, Ontario
		Report		Stadium: Joan of Arc Turf Field

July 11	Scarborough SC B	4–1	Serbian White Eagles B	Vaughan, Ontario
		Report		Stadium: Joan of Arc Turf Field

July 14	Halton United	2–0	Scarborough SC B	Burlington, Ontario
		Report		Stadium: Norton Park

July 22	Scarborough SC B	1–5	FC Vorkuta B	Vaughan, Ontario
		Report	Dyachenko; Haidarzhi; Bogdan Khmyzov; Polyuhanych; Yarmosh	Stadium: Joan of Arc Turf Field

July 29	Brantford Galaxy B	3–1	Scarborough SC B	Brantford, Ontario
		Report		Stadium: Steve Brown Sports Complex

August 4	Scarborough SC B	1–7	FC Vorkuta B	Vaughan, Ontario
		Report	Valery Doroshenko; Kristijan Kezic,, Melnyk; Polyuhanych,	Stadium: Joan of Arc Turf Field

August 12	Milton SC	4–3	Scarborough SC B	Milton, Ontario
		Report		Stadium: Milton Sports Centre

August 18	Scarborough SC B	2–1	Halton United	Vaughan, Ontario
		Report		Stadium: Joan of Arc Turf Field

August 24	Serbian White Eagles B	1–9	Scarborough SC B	Toronto, Ontario
		Report		Stadium: Centennial Park Stadium

September 2	Milton SC	8–5	Scarborough SC B	Milton, Ontario
19:30		Report		Stadium: Milton Sports Centre

September 5	Brantford Galaxy B	0–3	Scarborough SC B	Brantford, Ontario
		Report		Stadium: Steve Brown Sports Complex

September 10	Scarborough SC B	3–0	Serbian White Eagles B	Vaughan, Ontario
21:00		Report		Stadium: Joan of Arc Turf Field

September 19	Scarborough SC B	6–1	Milton SC	Vaughan, Ontario
		Report		Stadium: Joan of Arc Turf Field

==== Postseason ====
October 9 Semifinal	Halton United	3–1	Scarborough SC B	Burlington, Ontario
21:00	Christian Truyen 11', 63'; Karl Manzi 47'	Report	Edgar Oswaldo 31'	Stadium: Norton Park

== Statistics ==
=== Goals and assists ===
Correct as of October 13, 2018

First Division Goals
Pos.	Playing Pos.	Nation	Name	Appearances	Goals
1	FW	(Serbia)	Aleksandar Stojiljković	14	10
2	FW	(Jamaica)	Kavin Bryan	14	9
3	FW	(Canada)	Hammud Ali Atif	15	7
4	MF	(Bulgaria)	Kiril Dimitrov	12	3
5	MF	(Serbia)	Zoran Knežević	-	1
5	DF		Alen Kucalovic	-	1
Total				55	31

Second Division Goals
Pos.	Playing Pos.	Nation	Name	Appearances	Goals
1	FW	(Canada)	Matthaus Garcia	10	6
2	FW	(Canada)	Ryan Khedoo	7	5
3	FW	(Mexico)	Daniel González Vega	6	4
5	MF		Muhammet Furkan Demir	9	2
5	DF		Ricardo Fonseca	9	2
5	MF		Paul Mcghie	14	2
5	MF		Juan Rincon	14	2
Total				69	23
