= 2018 Hamilton City SC season =

Hamilton City SC
2018 season
- Manager: Kathleen Nurse
- Head Coach: Sasa Vukovic
- Canadian Soccer League: 5th place (First Division)
- CSL Championship: Quarterfinal
- Top goalscorer: Sani Dey (13 goals)
| Home colours | Away colours |

The 2018 season was Hamilton City SC's second season in the Canadian Soccer League. The season marked the return of Hamilton after a season's absence in order to reorganize. Their season began on May 19, 2018, in an away match to FC Vorkuta. Throughout the season Hamilton clinched an playoff berth after finishing fifth in the First Division. Their postseason journey came to a quick conclusion after a defeat to Scarborough SC in the Quarterfinals. The club's top goalscorer was Sani Dey with 13 goals, which made him the league's top goalscorer and was awarded the CSL Golden Boot.

== Summary ==
After a one-year sabbatical Hamilton returned to the Canadian Soccer League under new management. Former Brantford Galaxy head coach Sasa Vukovic was appointed in that capacity. In preparation for the season the organization transferred their home venue to Heritage Green Sport Park. The roster assembled by Vukovic consisted of former players and talent from their previous reserve team. Hamilton managed to produce an average season enough to secure a playoff berth with a fifth place standing in the First Division. In the postseason Hamilton faced Scarborough SC in the opening round, but were defeated in the opening round.

== Team ==
=== Roster ===
As of August 10, 2018

Note: Flags indicate national team as defined under FIFA eligibility rules; some limited exceptions apply. Players may hold more than one non-FIFA nationality.

| No. | Pos. | Nation | Player |
|---|---|---|---|
| 1 | GK | CAN | Stefan Avramovic |
| 2 | DF | CAN | Luke Rankin |
| 4 | MF | | Ahmed Mohamed |
| 5 | DF | CAN | Borna Juracic |
| 6 | DF | CAN | Simo Vrakela |
| 7 | MF | | Vukasin Kovacevic |
| 8 | MF | CAN | Lucas Raposo |
| 9 | FW | GHA | Sani Dey |
| 10 | FW | SVN | Timotej Zakrajsek |
| 11 | MF | | Joe Willingham |
| 12 | MF | | Alexsander Lasic |
| 14 | DF | | Justin Dargue |
| 15 | DF | | Stefan Stojanovic |
| 16 | MF | | Kristian Pulic |
| 17 | DF | CAN | Ivan Stojakovic |

| No. | Pos. | Nation | Player |
|---|---|---|---|
| 18 | DF | | Cvitan Jelcic |
| 19 | MF | CAN | Miroslav Cabrilo |
| 20 | FW | COL | Daniel Arcila |
| 21 | DF | CAN | Arsen Platis |
| 22 | MF | | Pani Sarkis |
| 23 | DF | | Borislav Kotev |
| - | MF | | Stefan Blazic |
| - | DF | | Marko Dzaric |
| - | FW | | Marko Ferlez |
| - | FW | BIH | Zoran Maletic |
| - | MF | | Filip Sekulic |
| - | DF | CAN | Yousef Tabanja |
| - | DF | | Milos Voruna |
| - | DF | | Alen Zakrajsek |

=== Management ===
| Position | Staff |
|---|---|
| Head coach | Sasa Vukovic |
| Assistant coach | Stefan Vukovic |
| Team trainer | Rajko Kunavc |
| Game Day manager | Kathleen Nurse |
| Media Relations | Kathleen Nurse |

Last updated: August 10, 2018
Source: canadiansoccerleague.ca

=== In ===
| No. | Pos. | Player | Transferred from | Fee/notes | Source |
|---|---|---|---|---|---|
| 20 | MF | (Colombia) Daniel Arcila | (United States) Fort Lauderdale Strikers | Free Transfer | |
| 19 | MF | (Canada) Miroslav Čabrilo | (Canada) Brantford Galaxy | Free Transfer | |
| 9 | FW | (Ghana) Sani Dey | (Canada) Burlington SC | Free Transfer | |

== Competitions ==
=== Canadian Soccer League ===
==== First Division ====
| Pos | Team | Pld | W | D | L | GF | GA | GD | Pts | Qualification |
|---|---|---|---|---|---|---|---|---|---|---|
| 1 | FC Ukraine United (C) | 16 | 12 | 2 | 2 | 60 | 16 | +44 | 38 | Playoffs |
| 2 | FC Vorkuta (O) | 16 | 12 | 2 | 2 | 55 | 16 | +39 | 38 | Playoffs |
| 3 | SC Waterloo Region | 16 | 9 | 2 | 5 | 34 | 33 | +1 | 29 | Playoffs |
| 4 | Scarborough SC | 16 | 8 | 5 | 3 | 34 | 20 | +14 | 29 | Playoffs |
| 5 | Hamilton City SC | 16 | 8 | 1 | 7 | 41 | 38 | +3 | 25 | Playoffs |
| 6 | Serbian White Eagles | 16 | 5 | 4 | 7 | 20 | 20 | 0 | 19 | Playoffs |
| 7 | SC Real Mississauga | 16 | 3 | 2 | 11 | 14 | 42 | −28 | 11 | Playoffs |
| 8 | Brantford Galaxy | 16 | 3 | 2 | 11 | 9 | 37 | −28 | 11 | Playoffs |
| 9 | CSC Mississauga | 16 | 1 | 2 | 13 | 9 | 37 | −28 | 5 | |

Updated to match(es) played on September 27, 2018. Source: http://canadiansoccerleague.ca/2018-csl-first-division-standings/
Rules for classification: 1) points; 2) goal difference; 3) number of goals scored.
(C) Champions; (O) Play-off winners

==== Results summary ====
| Overall | | | | | | | | Home | | | | | | Away | | | | | |
| Pld | W | D | L | GF | GA | GD | Pts | W | D | L | GF | GA | GD | W | D | L | GF | GA | GD |
|---|---|---|---|---|---|---|---|---|---|---|---|---|---|---|---|---|---|---|---|
| 16 | 8 | 1 | 7 | 41 | 38 | +3 | 25 | 4 | 1 | 3 | 20 | 20 | 0 | 4 | 0 | 4 | 21 | 18 | +3 |

Last updated: September 20, 2018.
Source: 2018 Canadian Soccer League season

==== Results by round ====
| Round | 1 | 2 | 3 | 4 | 5 | 6 | 7 | 8 | 9 | 10 | 11 | 12 | 13 | 14 | 15 | 16 |
|---|---|---|---|---|---|---|---|---|---|---|---|---|---|---|---|---|
| Ground | A | A | A | H | H | A | H | A | A | H | A | A | H | H | H | H |
| Result | L | L | W | L | W | W | L | W | W | D | L | L | L | W | W | W |

Updated to match(es) played on September 26, 2018. Source: CSL
A = Away; H = Home; W = Win; D = Draw; L = Loss

==== Matches ====
| May 19 | FC Vorkuta | 3–0 | Hamilton City SC | Vaughan, Ontario |
| | Ursulenko 37'; Solonynko 43'; Riabets 80' | Report | | Stadium: Ontario Soccer Centre |

| May 27 | Scarborough SC | 5–1 | Hamilton City SC | Toronto, Ontario |
| | Stojiljkovic 40', 55', 60', 80'; Dimitrov 70' | Report | Luke Rajain 3' | Stadium: Birchmount Stadium |

| June 2 | Brantford Galaxy | 0–4 | Hamilton City SC | Hamilton, Ontario |
| 20:30 | | Report | Arsen Platis 8'; Sani Dey 18', 39'; Vukasin Kovacevic 50' | Stadium: Heritage Field |

| June 9 | Hamilton City SC | 1–3 | FC Ukraine United | Hamilton, Ontario |
| 18:30 | Vukasin Kovacevic 75' | Report | Kucherenko 41'; Malysh 81'; Milishchuk 91' | Stadium: Heritage Field |

| June 23 | Hamilton City SC | 4–2 | SC Waterloo Region | Hamilton, Ontario |
| 18:30 | Lucas Raposo 4'; Sani Dey 65'; Arsen Platis 74'; Cabrilo 80' | Report | Vladimir Stankovic 15'; Aleksander Mitic 67' | Stadium: Heritage Field |

| July 6 | SC Real Mississauga | 1–2 | Hamilton City SC | Mississauga, Ontario |
| | Juan Dominquez 87' | Report | Lucas Raposo 4'; Joe Willingham 39' | Stadium: Hershey Centre |

| July 14 | Hamilton City SC | 1–2 | SC Real Mississauga | Hamilton, Ontario |
| | Timotej Zakrajsek 26' | Report | Miguel Angel Chavez Vejar 45'; Morgan Copeland 53' | Stadium: Heritage Field |

| July 27 | CSC Mississauga | 0–9 | Hamilton City SC | Mississauga, Ontario |
| 21:00 | | Report | Krista Glasanovic 1', 90'; Timotej Zakrajsek 4', 15', 33', 55'; Sani Dey,, | Stadium: Iceland Field |

| August 3 | Serbian White Eagles | 3–4 | Hamilton City SC | Toronto, Ontario |
| 19:00 | Kamberovic 3'; Luka Bojic 13'; Vukomanovic 92' | Report | Lucas Raposo 24'; Sani Dey 26', 75', 89' | Stadium: Centennial Park Stadium |

| August 18 | Hamilton City SC | 4–4 | Scarborough SC | Hamilton, Ontario |
| 18:30 | Marko Ferlez, Kristian Puljic, | Report | Bryan,, Hammud Ali Atif | Stadium: Heritage Field |

| August 31 | SC Waterloo Region | 3–0 | Hamilton City SC | Waterloo, Ontario |
| 20:30 | Miodrag Kovacevic 45', 70'; Adis Hasecic 50' | Report | | Stadium: RIM Park |

| September 9 | FC Ukraine United | 3–1 | Hamilton City SC | Toronto, Ontario |
| 19:00 | Hromyak 9'; Falkovskyi 69', 80' | Report | Filip Seculik 85' | Stadium: Centennial Park Stadium |

| September 16 | Hamilton City SC | 1–5 | FC Vorkuta | Hamilton, Ontario |
| 18:30 | Stefan Blazic 55' | Report | Haidarzhi; Ivliev,, Kerchu; Riabyi | Stadium: Heritage Field |

| September 18 | Hamilton City SC | 4–1 | CSC Mississauga | Hamilton, Ontario |
| 20:00 | Sani Dey 35', 64'; Marko Zelenica 63'; Kristian Puljic 89' | Report | Pero Menalo 33' | Stadium: Heritage Field |

| September 23 | Hamilton City SC | 2–1 | Brantford Galaxy | Hamilton, Ontario |
| 19:00 | Vukasin Kovacevic; Stefan Blazic | Report | Dokic | Stadium: Heritage Field |

| September 25 | Hamilton City SC | 3–2 | Serbian White Eagles | Hamilton, Ontario |
| | Sani Dey 18', 24'; Vukasin Kovacevic 49' | Report | Mihailo Madzar 22'; Bojan Vranic 59' | Stadium: Heritage Field |

==== Postseason ====
| September 29 Quarterfinal | Scarborough SC | 4–1 | Hamilton City SC | Toronto, Ontario |
| 17:00 | Angel Angelov 33'; Atif Hammud Ali 42'; Knežević 60'; Radakovic 70' | Report | Peter Aleksic 46' | Stadium: Birchmount Stadium |

== Statistics ==
=== Goals ===
Correct as of September 30, 2018

First Division Goals
| Pos. | Playing Pos. | Nation | Name | Appearances | Goals |
|---|---|---|---|---|---|
| 1 | FW | (Ghana) | Sani Dey | 13 | 13 |
| 2 | FW | (Slovenia) | Timotej Zakrajsek | 12 | 5 |
| 3 | MF | | Vukasin Kovacevic | 16 | 4 |
| 4 | MF | | Kristian Pulic | 14 | 3 |
| 4 | MF | (Canada) | Lucas Raposo | 9 | 3 |
| 5 | MF | | Stefan Blazic | - | 2 |
| 5 | FW | | Marko Ferlez | - | 2 |
| 5 | MF | | Krista Glasanovic | - | 2 |
| 5 | DF | (Canada) | Arsen Platis | - | 2 |
| 6 | MF | (Canada) | Miroslav Čabrilo | - | 1 |
| 6 | DF | | Luke Rankin | - | 1 |
| 6 | MF | | Filip Sekulic | - | 1 |
| 6 | MF | | Joe Willingham | - | 1 |
| 6 | MF | | Marko Zelenika | - | 1 |
| Total | | | | 64 | 40 |
