= Bogdan Bortnik =

Ukrainian footballer

Personal information
- Full name: Bogdan Vitalyevych Bortnik
- Date of birth: 24 January 1992 (age 34)
- Place of birth: Ukraine
- Position: Forward

Senior career*
Years	Team	Apps	(Gls)
2009–2013	Dynamo Khmelnytskyi	56	(4)
2017	FC Vorkuta	2	(1)
2017	→FC Vorkuta B (loan)	7	(1)
2019	Kingsman SC		
- * Club domestic league appearances and goals as of June 20, 2019

Bogdan Bortnik (Ukrainian: Богдан Віталійович Бортник; born January 24, 1992) is a Ukrainian footballer who played as a forward.

== Club career ==
=== Ukraine ===
Bortnik was a product of Dynamo Khmelnytskyi's youth system. He entered the professional ranks in 2009 by playing with the senior team in the Ukrainian Second League. In his debut season in the professional realm, he appeared in 8 matches. He would make his debut for the club on July 29, 2009, against MFC Mykolaiv. Bortnik left Dynamo in January 2011 due to financial problems regarding the club.

After two seasons in the third tier, he secured a contract with Volyn Lutsk in the premier league in the winter of 2011. However, before making an official appearance with the organization, his contract was terminated before the commencement of the season. Following his stint with Volyn, he returned to his former club Dynamo for the 2011-12 season. He returned for his final and fourth season with Dynamo to play in the 2012-13 season. In his final season in the third division, he played in 12 matches.

=== Canada ===
In the summer of 2017, he played in the Southern Ontario-based Canadian Soccer League with FC Vorkuta. In his debut season, he assisted in securing the regular season title. Throughout the season, he featured primarily in the league's second division, where he appeared in seven matches and scored one goal.

He was transferred to Kingsman SC, an expansion side that joined the league for the 2019 season. He would help the club secure a playoff berth by finishing eighth in the first division. In the opening round of the postseason, he contributed a goal against Vorkuta, which advanced the club to the next round. In the next round, Kingsman was eliminated from the competition by Scarborough SC.

== Honors ==
FC Vorkuta

- Canadian Soccer League First Division: 2017
