= Ihor Melnyk (footballer, born 1986) =

Ukrainian footballer

Personal information
- Full name: Ihor Vasylyovych Melnyk
- Date of birth: 21 August 1986 (age 40)
- Place of birth: Lviv, Ukrainian SSR, Soviet Union
- Height: 1.70 m (5 ft 7 in)
- Position: Striker

Senior career*
| Years | Team | Apps | (Gls) |
| 2004 | FC Khimik Novyi Rozdil | 4 | (0) |
| 2004–2005 | FC Kamenyar-Termoplast Drohobych (mini-football) | 3 | (0) |
| 2006–2007 | Karpaty Lviv | 0 | (0) |
| 2006 | Karpaty-2 Lviv | 29 | (15) |
| 2007 | → Krymteplytsia Molodizhne (loan) | 12 | (4) |
| 2007–2009 | Krymteplytsia Molodizhne | 69 | (8) |
| 2010 | Oleksandria | 32 | (4) |
| 2011 | Lviv | 13 | (3) |
| 2011 | Bukovyna Chernivtsi | 18 | (1) |
| 2012 | Lviv | 11 | (6) |
| 2012–2013 | Krymteplytsia Molodizhne | 20 | (2) |
| 2013–2014 | Nyva Ternopil | 35 | (11) |
| 2015–2016 | Toronto Atomic | 33 | (12) |
| 2017 | Ukraine United | | |
| 2018–2020 | Vorkuta | | |
| 2021 | Hungaria Vasas | | |
- * Club domestic league appearances and goals as of 29 March 2018

Ihor Melnyk (Ukrainian: Ігор Васильович Мельник; born 21 August 1986) is a former professional Ukrainian football striker.

== Club career ==
=== Ukraine ===
Melnyk was a product of the Lviv Oblast Sportive School System. After graduating from the Lviv Oblast Academy he spent time in the Ukrainian Football Amateur League with FC Khimik Novyi Rozdil and FC Kamenyar-Termoplast Drohobych.

He would sign a contract with Ukrainian Premier League side Karpaty Lviv in 2006. Throughout his tenure with Karpaty, he only saw action in the Ukrainian Second League with the reserve team. During the 2006–07 season, he finished as the club's top goal scorer with 10 goals.

After a season with the Lviv-based organization, he went south of the country to play with Krymteplytsia Molodizhne in 2007. He would permanently sign with Krymteplytsia in 2007, and play in the Ukrainian First League. In 2010, he remained in the second division by signing with PFC Oleksandria. In his debut season with Oleksandria, he played in 15 matches and scored 4 goals. During his short stint with Oleksandria, he helped the club secure promotion to the premier league by winning the division.

In the winter of 2011, he signed with FC Lviv. His stint with Lviv was short-lived as the club ran into financial difficulties. In total, he played in 13 matches and recorded 3 goals. Due to Lviv's financial problems, he would sign with Bukovyna Chernivtsi in July 2011. Melnyk recorded his first goal for Bukovyna on September 19, 2011, against FC Dynamo-2 Kyiv. His tenure with Bukovyna only lasted half a season as he was released in the winter of 2012.

Following his release from Bukovyna, he returned to his former club FC Lviv to finish off the season. In his return season in Lviv, he played in 11 matches and recorded 6 goals. After a single season with Lviv, he returned to the Crimean peninsula to play with former club Krymteplytsia in 2012. In 2013, he played in the third division with Nyva Ternopil. He would miss the majority of the season as he received a leg injury. As the club would secure promotion to the second division, Melnyk would return for another season. Unfortunately, the organization experienced financial difficulties which resulted in Melnyk departing from Lviv in the summer of 2014. Following his release from Nyva, he played in the regional Lviv league with FC Lapaivka.

=== Canada ===
In the summer of 2015, he played abroad in the Southern Ontario-based Canadian Soccer League with Toronto Atomic FC. He made his debut for the club on May 11, 2015, against Niagara United where he also recorded his first goal. In his debut season with Toronto, he helped the club in securing a playoff berth by finishing fifth in the league's first division. Toronto would be eliminated in the opening round of the postseason by SC Waterloo Region. Melnyk was recognized by the league for his efforts by receiving the Rookie of the Year award. He would re-sign with Toronto for the 2016 season. Atomic once more secured a playoff spot where the Serbian White Eagles eliminated them from the competition in the first round.

In 2017, he played at the provincial amateur level in the Ontario Soccer League with FC Ukraine United's reserve team in the Provincial East division where he was named the Rookie of the Year. After a season at the amateur level, he returned to the CSL to play with FC Vorkuta in 2018. He would help Vorkuta secure a postseason berth by finishing second in the first division. In the opening round of the playoffs, Melnyk would contribute a goal against SC Real Mississauga which helped advance the club to the next round. After defeating Scarborough SC, Vorkuta would ultimately reach the CSL Championship where the club successfully clinched the title.

He re-signed with Vorkuta for the 2019 season. Melnyk would assist the club in securing the divisional title, resulting in an automatic playoff berth. However, the club was eliminated in the first round of the tournament by Kingsman SC. The 2020 season marked his third season with Vorkuta. Vorkuta would claim their second championship title after defeating Scarborough in the playoff finals. In 2021, he returned to the Ontario amateur level, to play with Hungaria Vasas.

== Honors ==
FC Oleksandria

- Ukrainian First League: 2010-2011

FC Vorkuta

- CSL Championship: 2018
- CSL II Championship: 2018
- Canadian Soccer League First Division: 2019

Individual

- Canadian Soccer League Rookie of the Year: 2015
