= Ryabets =

Ryabets or Riabets (Ukrainian: Рябець) is a Ukrainian surname. Notable people with the surname include:

- Bohdan Riabets (born 1991), Ukrainian footballer
- Nadezhda Ryabets (born 2000), Kazakhstani boxer
