= Valeriy Yarmosh =

Ukrainian footballer (born 1995)

Valery Yarmosh
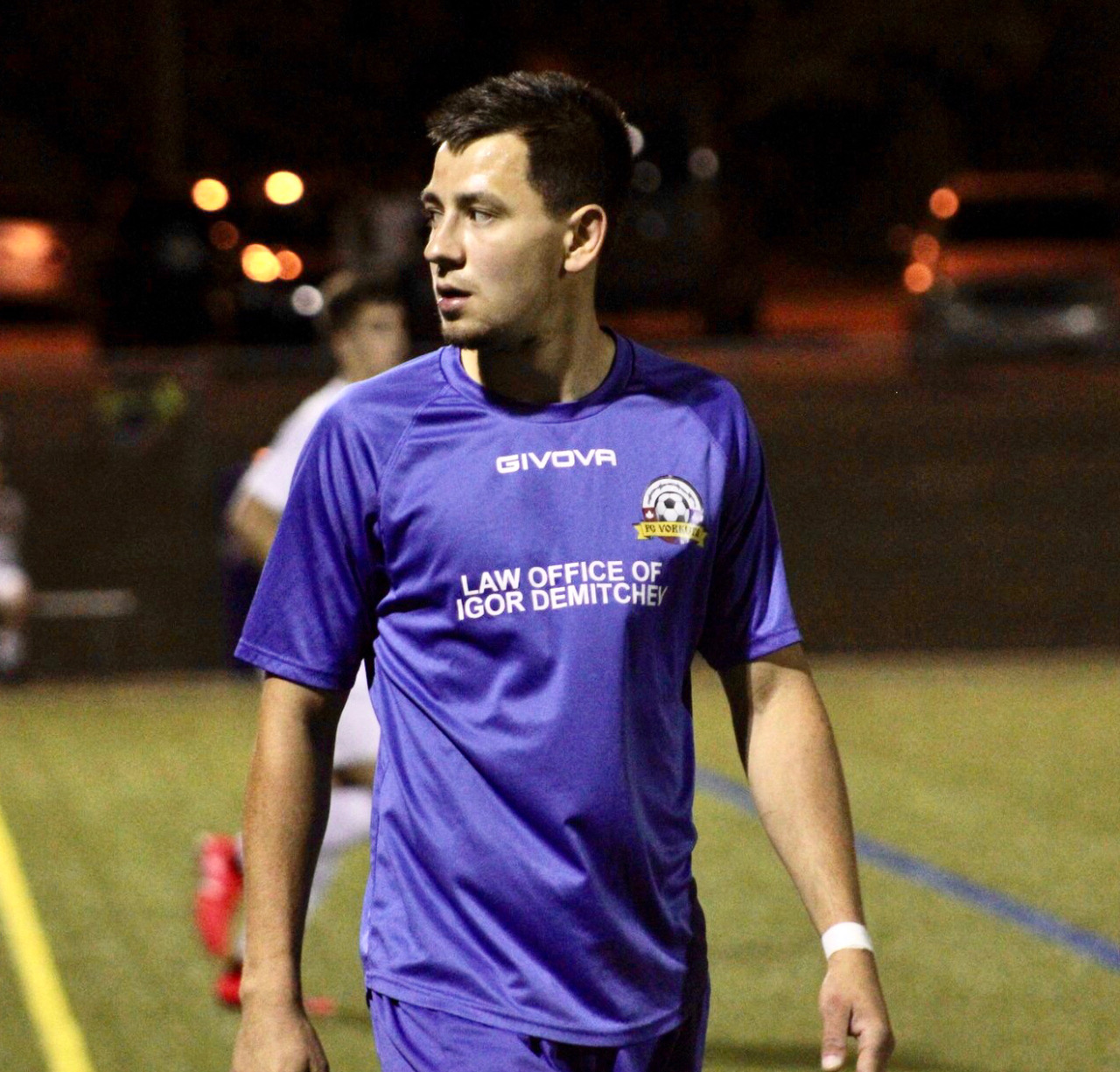
- Yarmosh in 2019

Personal information
- Full name: Valery Yarmosh
- Date of birth: 15 January 1995 (age 31)
- Place of birth: Ukraine
- Position: Midfielder

Senior career*
Years	Team	Apps	(Gls)
2013–2014	FC Dynamo Khmelnytskyi	1	(0)
2017–2021	FC Vorkuta		
2017–2018	→ FC Vorkuta B (loan)	17	(10)
2019	→ Kingsman SC (loan)		
2022	Toronto Falcons		
2023	Dynamo Toronto		
- * Club domestic league appearances and goals

Valery Yarmosh (born January 15, 1995) is a Ukrainian footballer.

== Club career ==
=== Ukraine ===
Yarmosh was nominated for the best forward award at the Khmelnytskyi youth sports school in 2012.

He joined the professional ranks in the Ukrainian Second League with Dynamo Khmelnytskyi in 2013. He made his debut for the club on July 14, 2013, against Kremin Kremenchuk. Shortly after his appearance, he was released from Dynamo.

He would play at the futsal level during the winter of 2015–16 with Sportleader-2 Khmelnytskyi.

=== Canada ===
In 2017, he played abroad in the Canadian Soccer League with Vorkuta. Vorkuta would secure the first division title and a playoff berth. In the postseason, the club would be eliminated in the semifinal round by Scarborough SC. The following season, he would primarily feature in the league's second division with the club's reserve side and finished as the club's top goal scorer with 8 goals. The reserve team would secure a playoff berth by clinching the division title. In the preliminary round of the postseason, the team defeated Brantford Galaxy's reserve team to advance to the championship match. Vorkuta would successfully capture the second-division championship by defeating Halton United. Meanwhile, the senior team secured the first-division championship by defeating Scarborough in the finals.

For the 2019 season, he was loaned to the expansion franchise Kingsman SC. He would also assist the expansion team in securing a playoff berth by finishing eighth in the league's first division. In the opening round of the postseason, Kingsman would defeat his former club, Vorkuta to advance to the next round. Their playoff journey would conclude in the next round after a defeat by Scarborough.

Yarmosh returned to Vorkuta for the 2020 season. Throughout the campaign, he helped Vorkuta secure a playoff berth by finishing second in the division. Ultimately, the club would win the championship title by defeating Scarborough.

In 2021, he assisted in securing Vorkuta's third regular-season title and secured the ProSound Cup against Scarborough. He also played in the 2021 championship final where Vorkuta was defeated by Scarborough.

In 2022, he signed with the expansion franchise the Toronto Falcons. After a season with the Falcons, he signed with Dynamo Toronto for the 2023 season.

== Honors ==
FC Vorkuta

- Canadian Soccer League First Division: 2017
- CSL Championship: 2020
