= Denis Dyachenko =

Ukrainian footballer

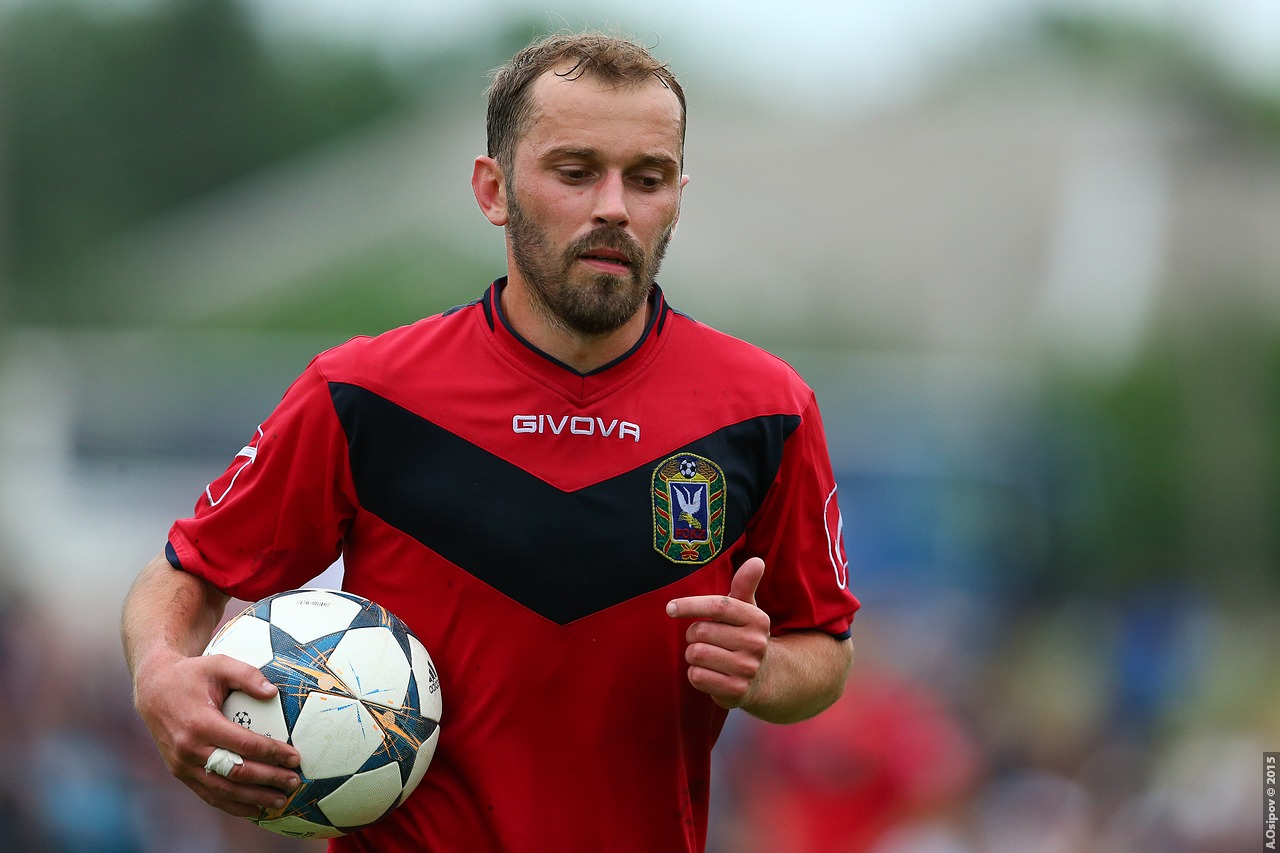
- Dyachenko in 2015

Personal information
- Full name: Denis Leonidovych Dyachenko
- Date of birth: 25 May 1986 (age 40)
- Place of birth: Mahdalynivka, Ukrainian SSR, Soviet Union
- Height: 1.80 m (5 ft 11 in)
- Position: Midfielder

Senior career*
Years	Team	Apps	(Gls)
2003–2005	Arsenal Kyiv	0	(0)
2004	→ Arsenal-2 Kyiv	4	(1)
2004	→ CSKA Kyiv	0	(0)
2005	→ Borysfen Boryspil (loan)	0	(0)
2005–2009	Illichivets Mariupol	0	(0)
2005–2009	→ Illichivets-2 Mariupol	52	(2)
2008–2009	→ Feniks-Illichovets Kalinine	11	(0)
2009–2010	Stal Alchevsk	6	(0)
2010–2011	Poltava	8	(0)
2011–2012	Dynamo Khmelnytskyi	15	(0)
2011–2013	Stal Dniprodzerzhynsk	16	(0)
2017–2018	Vorkuta	13	(3)
2017	→ Vorkuta B (loan)	3	(1)
2018–2019	Ukraine AC (indoor)		
2019	Kingsman SC		
2022–2024	Toronto Falcons		
- * Club domestic league appearances and goals

Denis Dyachenko (Ukrainian: Денис Леонідович Дяченко; born May 25, 1986) is a Ukrainian footballer who played as a midfielder.

== Career ==
=== Ukraine ===
Dyachenko began his career in 2003 with Arsenal Kiev in the Ukrainian Premier League, but played in the Ukrainian Second League with FC Arsenal-2 Kyiv. In 2005, he signed with Illichivets Mariupol, where he was loaned to their reserve team, Illichivets-2 Mariupol. He played in the Ukrainian First League originally in 2008 with Feniks-Illichovets Kalinine.

The following season, he remained in the second tier by signing with Stal Alchevsk. After a single season with Stal, he departed from the club. In total, he played in 6 matches with Alchevk.

In 2010, he returned to the third tier to sign with FC Poltava. After the conclusion of the season, he departed from Poltava. He later had stints with Dynamo Khmelnytskyi and Stal Kamianske.

=== Canada ===
In 2017, he went abroad to play in the Canadian Soccer League with FC Vorkuta. In his debut season, he assisted in securing the First Division title. Vorkuta would defeat Royal Toronto FC in the opening round of the postseason. The club was eliminated from the playoffs in the next round by Scarborough SC. He re-signed with Vorkuta for the 2018 season. In his second season with the club, he assisted in securing the CSL Championship.

After the conclusion of the summer season, he played indoor soccer in the Arena Premier League with Ukraine AC. For the 2019 CSL season, he was transferred to the expansion franchise Kingsman SC.

In 2022, he returned to the Canadian circuit to play with the expansion franchise Toronto Falcons. Dyachenko re-signed with Toronto for the following season. He helped the team finish third in the standings.

== Honors ==
FC Vorkuta

- CSL Championship: 2018
- Canadian Soccer League First Division: 2017
