= Fadi Salback =

Israeli footballer (born 1998)

Fadi Salback פאדי סלבק
Personal information
- Date of birth: 8 January 1998 (age 28)
- Place of birth: Haifa, Israel
- Height: 1.85 m (6 ft 1 in)
- Position: Forward

Team information
- Current team: Whitby FC
- Number: 9

Youth career
- Maccabi Haifa
- Scarborough Blizzard SC

College career
Years	Team	Apps	(Gls)
2019	Ontario Tech Ridgebacks	16	(15)

Senior career*
Years	Team	Apps	(Gls)
2019	FC Vorkuta B	3	(9)
2019	FC Vorkuta	5	(4)
2020–2021	Podillya Khmelnytskyi	22	(8)
2021	Bukovyna Chernivtsi	13	(4)
2022	Hapoel Bu'eine		
2022	Maccabi Tzur Shalom		
2022–2023	Hapoel Migdal HaEmek		
2023	Maccabi Ata-Bialik		(8)
2023–2024	Maccabi Nujeidat		
2024	North Toronto Nitros	20	(14)
2024	→ North Toronto Nitros B	1	(1)
2025–	Whitby FC	2	(1)
- * Club domestic league appearances and goals as of June 7, 2025

Fadi Salback (Hebrew: פאדי סלבק; born January 8, 1998) is an Israeli footballer who plays as a forward for Whitby FC in League1 Ontario.

== Early life ==
Salback was born in Haifa, Israel, and began playing youth football at age eight with Maccabi Haifa. Later in his youth, he immigrated to Canada with his family. He later played with the Ontario U16 provincial team.

== University career ==
In 2019, Salback began attending Ontario Tech University, where he played for the men's soccer team. He scored his first goal on September 1, 2019, in the first match of the season against the Carleton Ravens, which earned him the school's Athlete of the Week honour. On October 6, 2019, he scored a hat trick in a 4-0 victory over the Queen's Gaels, subsequently being named both the school's and OUA's Athlete of the Week. At the end of his first season, he set a team single-season scoring record and led the league in goals in the regular season with 15. At the end of the season, he was named the OUA Rookie of the Year and a First Team All-Star. He was also named to the U Sports All-Rookie Team. At the end of the year, he was named the school's Male Athlete of the Year.

== Club career ==
In April 2019, he began playing with FC Vorkuta in the Non-FIFA-based Canadian Soccer League, after being spotted in an amateur indoor league. He initially began with the second team, scoring four goals in his debut match, before quickly being promoted to the first team. Salback would help the senior Vorkuta team secure the divisional title.

In the summer of 2020, Salback went on trial with FC Podillya Khmelnytskyi in the Ukrainian Second League. In September 2020, he officially signed a contract with the club. He recorded his first two goals on October 10, 2020, against FC Uzhhorod, and began the season scoring five goals in his first six games. In his debut season with Podillya, he assisted in securing promotion to the Ukrainian First League by finishing first in the Group A division.

On July 20, 2021, he signed a contract with Bukovyna Chernivtsi. In November 2021, his contract was terminated with Bukovyna due to the war in Ukraine.

In January 2022, he signed a contract with Hapoel Bu'eine F.C. in the Israeli third-tier Liga Alef. After a short term at Hapoel, he signed with league rivals Maccabi Tzur Shalom in February 2022. In July 2022, he remained in the Israeli third tier by signing with Hapoel Migdal HaEmek. During the season, he moved to Maccabi Ata-Bialik, where he scored eight goals. In July 2023, he joined Maccabi Nujeidat.

In 2024, he played with the North Toronto Nitros in League1 Ontario and was named a Second Team All-Star.

== Honours ==
Podillya Khmelnytskyi

- Ukrainian Second League Group A: 2020–21

FC Vorkuta

- Canadian Soccer League First Division: 2019

== Career statistics ==
As of 14 November 2021

Club	Season	League			National Cup		League Cup		Continental		Total	
Club	Season	Division	Apps	Goals	Apps	Goals	Apps	Goals	Apps	Goals	Apps	Goals
FC Vorkuta B	2019	Canadian Soccer League Second Division	3	9	—		—		—		3	9
FC Vorkuta	2019	Canadian Soccer League First Division	5	4	—		—		—		5	4
Podillya Khmelnytskyi	2020–21	Ukrainian Second League	22	8	0	0	—		—		22	8
Bukovyna Chernivtsi	2021–22	Ukrainian Second League	13	4	2	1	—		—		12	4
Career total			43	25	2	1	0	0	0	0	45	26
