= Taras Kryvyi =

Ukrainian footballer

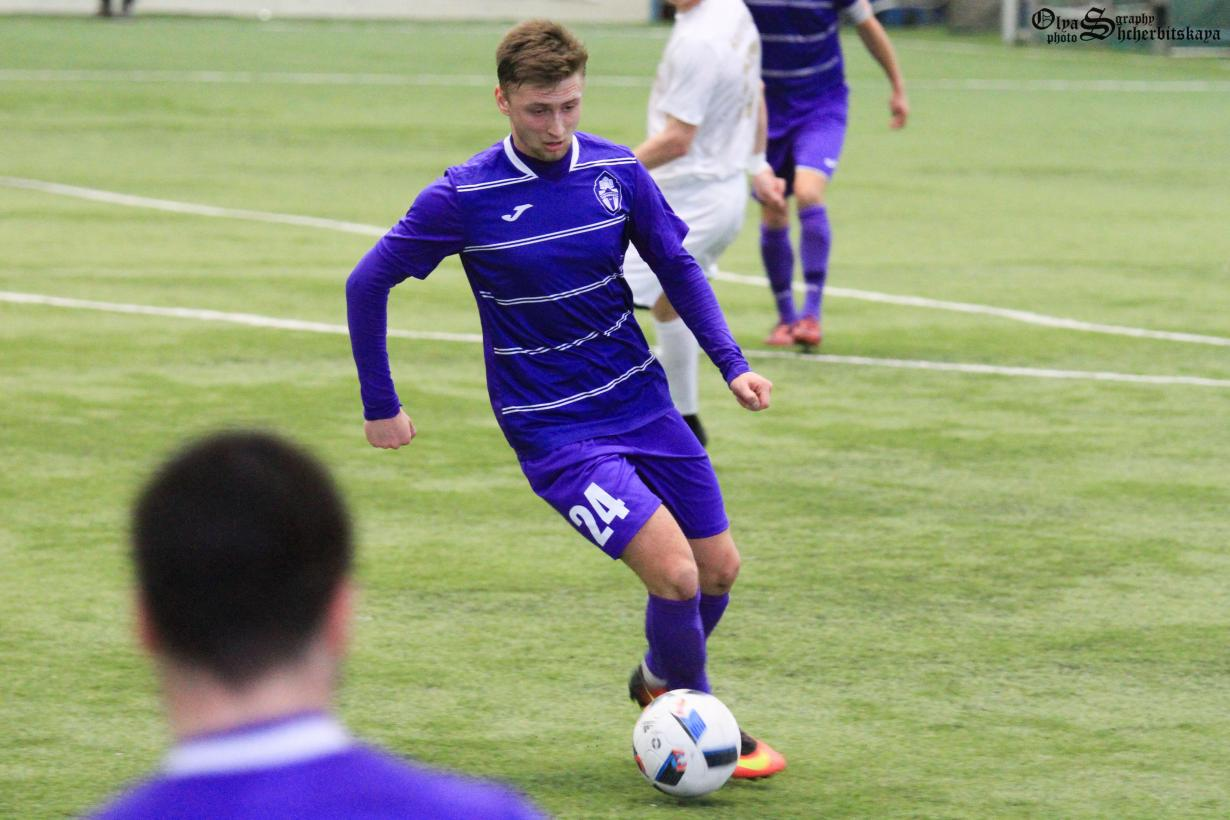
- Kryvyi in 2017

Personal information
- Full name: Taras Ivanoych Kryvyi
- Date of birth: 24 December 1995 (age 30)
- Place of birth: Hvardiiske, Terebovlia Raion, Ukraine
- Position: Midfielder

Senior career*
Years	Team	Apps	(Gls)
2012–2017	Ternopil	70	(2)
2017	Nyva Trebovila	12	(3)
2017–2019	Nyva Ternopil	22	(0)
2019	FC Ukraine United	12	(6)
2020–2021	Kolos Buchach		
2021	FC Ukraine United		
- * Club domestic league appearances and goals

Taras Kryvyi (Ukrainian: Тарас Іванович Кривий; born 24 December 1995) is a Ukrainian footballer who plays as a midfielder.

== Club career ==
=== Ukraine ===
Kryvyi began his career in 2012 with Ternopil in the Ukrainian Football Amateur League. He would play in the professional realm with Ternopil in the Ukrainian Second League. In his debut season in the third tier, he would make 5 appearances. He re-signed with Ternopil the following season and helped the team secure a promotion to the Ukrainian First League. He would play in 6 matches throughout the 2013-14 season.

In his first season in the country's second-tier league, he played in 12 matches. During the 2015-16 campaign, he participated in the 2015–16 Ukrainian Cup, where Ternopil faced Shakhtar Donetsk. The 2016-17 season marked his fifth and final season with Ternopil. He would initially miss the opening section of the season due to an injury. In his final season in the second tier, he played in 21 matches.

After Ternopil was relegated in 2017, he returned to the amateur level to play with Nyva Terebovila. He departed from Nyva in the autumn of 2017. Shortly after, he returned to the Ukrainian Second League to sign with Nyva Ternopil. In his debut season with Nyva, he played in 7 matches. After two seasons with Nyva, he declined to renew his contract with the club to pursue other options abroad.

=== Canada ===
In 2019, he played abroad in the Canadian Soccer League with FC Ukraine United. In his debut season with the Western-Toronto side, he finished second in the team scoring charts with 6 goals. Kryvyi would help Ukraine United secure a postseason berth by finishing third in the league's first division. Their opponents, Hamilton City, were defeated in the first round of the playoffs. After defeating SC Waterloo Region, they advanced to the championship finals. In the finals, the club was defeated by Scarborough SC.

Following his brief stint in the southern Ontario circuit, Kryvyi returned to Ukraine in 2020, where he played in the regional Ternopil amateur league with Kolos Buchach and Medobory Zelene. He returned to his former club, Ukraine United, where he played the 2021 season in the Ontario Soccer League.

== Honors ==
FC Ukraine United

- CSL Championship runner-up: 2019
