= Oleksandr Lakusta =

Ukrainian footballer

Personal information
- Full name: Oleksandr Anatolyevych Lakusta
- Date of birth: 8 August 1991 (age 35)
- Place of birth: Chernivtsi, Ukraine SSR, Soviet Union
- Position: Forward

Senior career*
| Years | Team | Apps | (Gls) |
| 2004–2008 (UYFL) | FSC Bukovyna Chernivtsi | 74 | (20) |
| 2009 | FSC Bukovyna Chernivtsi | 9 | (0) |
| 2012–2013 | Nyva Ternopil | 28 | (4) |
| 2013–2014 | Dynamo Khmelnytskyi | 15 | (5) |
| 2015 | FSC Bukovyna Chernivtsi | 3 | (0) |
| 2015–2016 | NK Veres Rivne | 26 | (7) |
| 2016 | MFK Mykolaiv | 6 | (0) |
| 2017–2018 | FC Vorkuta | 9 | (4) |
| 2017 | → FC Vorkuta B (loan) | 6 | (4) |
| 2022 | Toronto Falcons | | |
- * Club domestic league appearances and goals

Oleksandr Lakusta (born August 8, 1991) is a Ukrainian former footballer who played as a forward.

== Club career ==
=== Ukraine ===
Lakusta played at the youth level with FSC Bukovyna Chernivtsi. He transitioned into the senior team in 2008 where he played for two seasons in the Ukrainian Second League. In 2012, he departed from Bukovyna in order to sign with Nyva Ternopil. He would appear in 27 matches and scored 4 goals in his debut season with Ternopil. After a single season with the club, he was released from his contract.

Lakusta was linked to a possible return to his former club Bukovyna where he ultimately rejected the offer. He instead secured a deal with Dynamo Khmelnytskyi and would remain in the third tier. Following his brief stint with Dynamo, he returned to his former club Bukovyna for the 204-15 season in the Ukrainian First League. In his debut season in the second tier, he appeared in 3 matches.

He returned to the third tier the next season to sign with Veres Rivne. Lakusta had another run in the second tier the following season with Mykolaiv. In his second stint in the league, he appeared in 6 matches. After the conclusion of the season, he mutually departed from Mykolaiv.

=== Canada ===
He went abroad in the summer of 2017, to play in the Canadian Soccer League with FC Vorkuta. In his debut season with Vorkuta, he assisted the club in securing the First Division title. In the postseason the club was eliminated in the second round by Scarborough SC. Through an injury, he missed the majority of the season.

Lakusta re-signed with the club for the 2018 season. Once more he aided the team in securing a playoff berth by finishing second in the division. In the postseason, Vorkuta successfully secured the CSL Championship by defeating Scarborough in a penalty shootout.

In 2022, he signed with the expansion franchise Toronto Falcons.

== Honors ==
FC Vorkuta

- Canadian Soccer League First Division: 2017
- CSL Championship: 2018
