= Oleksandr Volchkov =

Ukrainian footballer

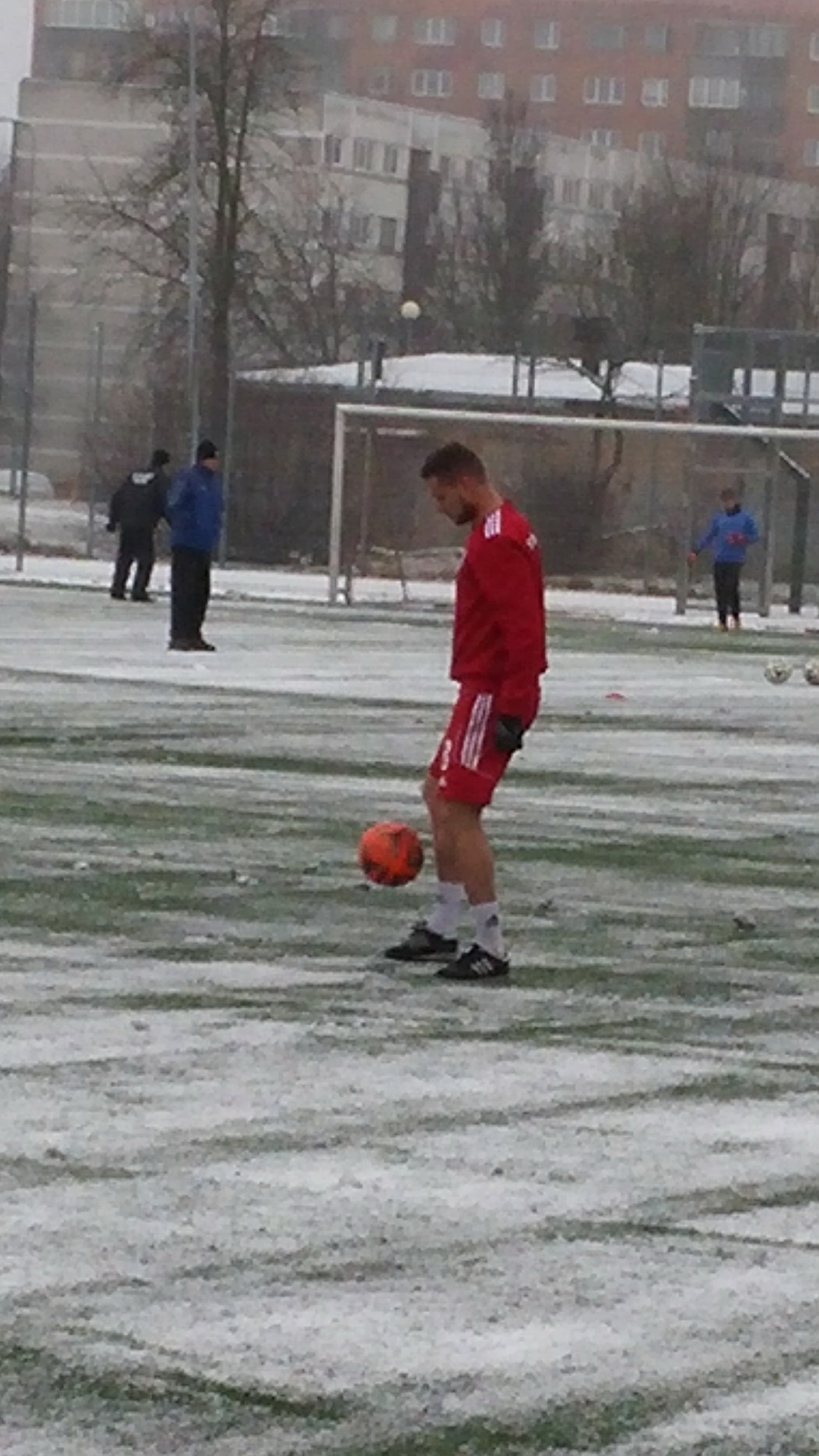
- Volchkov in 2014

Personal information
- Full name: Oleksandr Volchkov
- Date of birth: 18 July 1985 (age 41)
- Place of birth: Uspenivka, Odesa Oblast, Ukrainian SSR
- Position: Defender

Senior career*
Years	Team	Apps	(Gls)
2004–2005	Enerhiya Yuzhnoukrainsk	9	(0)
2005	Mykolaiv	3	(0)
2006	Enerhiya Yuzhnoukrainsk	14	(0)
2007–2008	Bastion Illichivsk (AAFU)		
2008–2010	Bastion Illichivsk	48	(5)
2011	Mykolaiv	10	(0)
2012	Nyva Vinnytsia	13	(0)
2012	Odesa	17	(0)
2013	Nistru Otaci	1	(0)
2013–2014	Levadia	15	(1)
2014	→ Levadia II	9	(0)
2014	→ Lokomotiv (loan)	14	(1)
2015	Ararat Yerevan	11	(0)
2015	Alashkert	0	(0)
2015–2016	Zaria Bălți	0	(0)
2015–2016	FC Hirnyk-Sport Horishni Plavni	15	(0)
2016–2017	FC Inhulets Petrove	8	(0)
2017–2021	FC Vorkuta	4	(1)
- * Club domestic league appearances and goals as of 29 November 2017

Oleksandr Volchkov (Ukrainian: Олекса́ндр Анато́лійович Волчко́в; born 18 July 1985) is a Ukrainian former professional footballer who played as a defender.

== Club career ==
=== Ukraine ===
Volchkov began his career in 2004 in the Ukrainian Second League with Enerhiya Yuzhnoukrainsk and later played with Mykolaiv. In 2007, he played in the Ukrainian Amateur Football Championship with Bastion Chornomorsk and won promotion to the Second League in 2008.

In the winter of 2011, he made his debut in the Ukrainian First League with MFC Mykolaiv. Volchkov continued playing in the second division by securing a contract with Nyva Vinnytsia in 2012. He would appear in 13 matches for Nyva. After a season in Western Ukraine, he signed with his hometown club FC Odesa in the summer of 2012.

=== Moldova ===
In the summer of 2013, he played abroad in the Moldovan top division with Nistru Otaci. In total, he appeared in 1 match for Nistru.

=== Estonia ===
The following season he was transferred to the Meistriliiga to play with Levadia Tallinn. During his stint with Levadia, he featured in the 2013–14 UEFA Europa League against CS Pandurii Târgu Jiu. In his debut season with the club, he played in 13 matches and scored 1 goal. Throughout his tenure with Levadia, he secured a league double (league title and Estonian Cup).

After two seasons with Levadia, he was loaned out to Jõhvi FC Lokomotiv in 2014.

=== Armenia ===
In January 2015, Volchkov joined Armenian side Ararat Yerevan on trial, before later signing permanently for the club. In total, he played in 11 matches for Aarat. Six months later, in June 2015, Volchkov moved to fellow Armenian Premier League side Alashkert.

=== Europe ===
Following his brief stint in the Caucasus, he returned to the Moldavian top-tier to play with Zaria Bălți. However, his stay in Moldova was short-lived as he failed to receive the necessary work permit to remain in the country. After his release from Zaria, he returned to his native country to once more play in the second-tier league, this time with Hirnyk-Sport Horishni Plavni. After a single season with the club, he departed in the summer of 2016.

His final season in the Ukrainian circuit was in the 2016-17 campaign, after he signed with newly promoted Inhulets Petrove in the summer transfer window. After appearing in 8 matches during the first period of the season, he became a free agent in the winter transfer window.

=== Canada ===
He went overseas in 2017 to play in the Canadian Soccer League with FC Vorkuta. Volchkov would assist the club in securing the First Division title. Vorkuta would be eliminated in the second round of the playoffs by Scarborough SC. After the conclusion of the 2017 season, he extended his contract for another season. In his second year with Vorkuta, he helped the club secure a playoff berth by finishing second in the division. Ultimately, the club reached the championship final, where they successfully defeated Scarborough.

He would return for his third season in 2019. Throughout the season, he assisted the club in securing its second divisional title. In the first round of the postseason, he contributed a goal against Kingsman SC but was eliminated from the competition after a penalty shootout. Volchkov returned for the 2020 season. The team secured a playoff berth by finishing second in the division. In the preliminary round of the postseason, Vorkuta defeated the Serbian White Eagles to advance to the championship final. Volchkov would help the club secure its second championship title after defeating Scarborough.

The 2021 season would mark his final term with the organization. During the campaign, he assisted in securing Vorkuta's third regular-season title. The club would also win the ProSound Cup by defeating Scarborough.

== Honours ==
Bastion Illichivsk

- Ukrainian Football Amateur League: 2007

FC Levadia Tallinn

- Meistriliiga: 2014
- Estonian Cup: 2013–14

FC Vorkuta

- CSL Championship: 2018, 2020
- Canadian Soccer League First Division/Regular Season: 2017, 2019, 2021
