= Yaroslav Solonynko =

Ukrainian footballer

Personal information
- Full name: Yaroslav Zinoviyovich Solonynko
- Date of birth: 2 April 1991 (age 35)
- Place of birth: Khmelnytskyi, Ukrainian SSR, Soviet Union
- Position: Midfielder

Team information
- Current team: Toronto Falcons

Senior career*
Years	Team	Apps	(Gls)
2008–2010	FC Dynamo Khmelnytskyi	20	(0)
2010–2012	FC Obolon-Brovar Kyiv	0	(0)
2011–2012	FC Dynamo Khmelnytskyi	19	(2)
2012–2013	FC Hirnyk-Sport Horishni Plavni	20	(0)
2012–2014	FC Dynamo Khmelnytskyi	21	(0)
2014	FC Zhemchuzhina Yalta		
2014–2016	Rol.Ko Konojady		
2016–2017	FC Ternopil	16	(0)
2017–2021	FC Vorkuta	53	(19)
2017	→ FC Vorkuta B (loan)	3	(3)
2022–	Toronto Falcons		
- * Club domestic league appearances and goals as of October 6, 2020

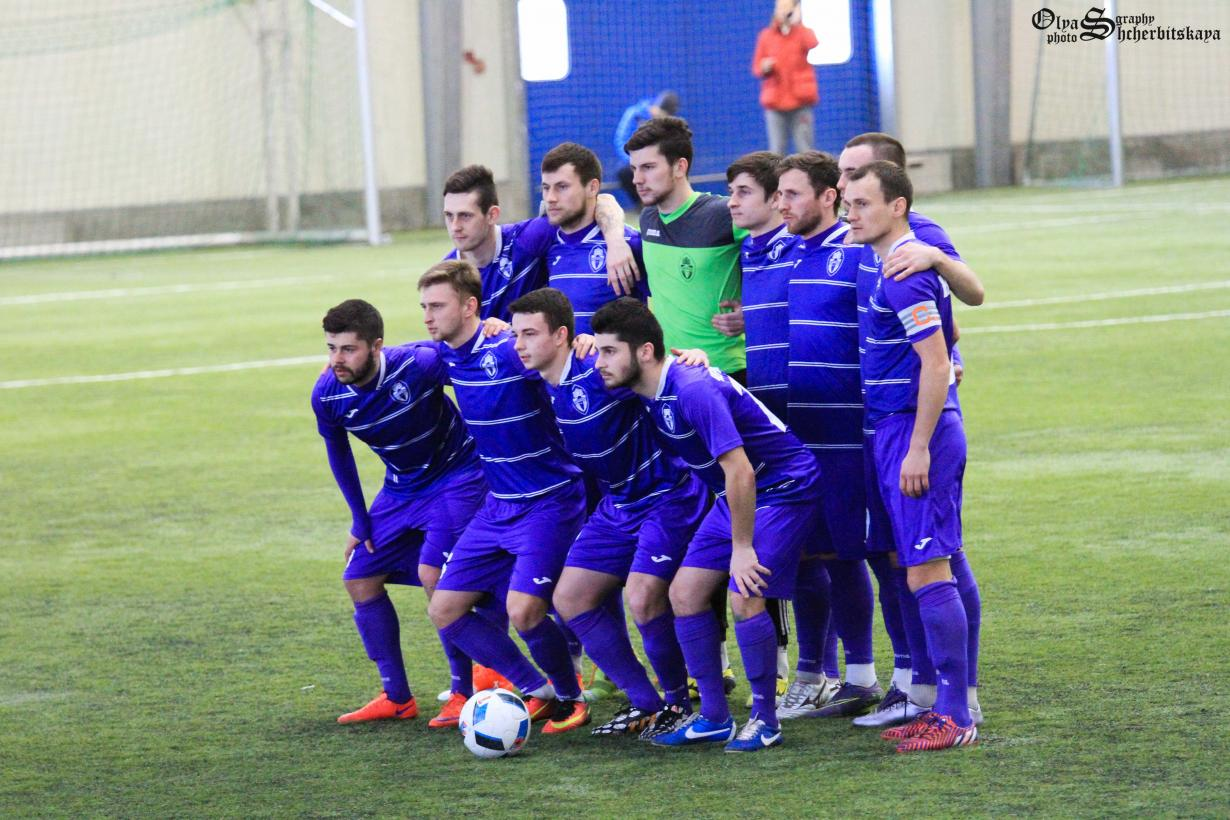
Makarova Memorial

Yaroslav Solonynko (born April 2, 1991) is a Ukrainian footballer who plays with Toronto Falcons in the Canadian Soccer League.

== Career ==
=== Europe ===
Solonynko began his career in 2008 with Dynamo Khmelnytskyi in the Ukrainian Second League. Throughout his tenure with Dynamo, he played in 20 matches over two seasons. In 2010, he signed a contract with Obolon-Brovar Kyiv of the Ukrainian Premier League. After failing to break into the first team with Kyiv, he returned to his former club, Dynamo, on a loan deal in 2011.

He remained in the Second League by signing with league rivals Hirnyk-Sport Horishni Plavni in 2012. During his tenure with Hirnyk-Sport, he debuted in the Ukrainian Cup against Naftovyk Okhtyrka, where he scored a goal. They were eliminated in the next round by Ukrainian Premier League side Tavriya Simferopol. He played in the Russian Professional Football League with Zhemchuzhina Yalta the following season. In 2014, he played abroad in Poland's IV liga with Rol.Ko Konojady. In 2016, he returned to Ukraine to sign with FC Ternopil in the Ukrainian First League. In his debut season with Ternopil, he played in 16 matches.

=== Canada ===
After the relegation of Ternopil, he went overseas to play in the Canadian Soccer League with FC Vorkuta. Throughout the season, he helped secure the league's first division title. In his second season with Vorkuta, he assisted in securing the CSL Championship. In 2020, he assisted in securing Vorkuta's second championship title after defeating Scarborough SC.

In 2021, he assisted in securing Vorkuta's third regular-season title and secured the ProSound Cup against Scarborough. He also played in the 2021 playoffs, where Vorkuta was defeated by Scarborough in the championship final. After five seasons with Vorkuta, he signed with the expansion franchise Toronto Falcons. He re-signed with the Falcons for the 2023 season, in which he helped the club secure the Royal CSL Cup against the Serbian White Eagles.

== Honors ==
FC Vorkuta

- CSL Championship: 2018, 2020
- Canadian Soccer League First Division/Regular Season: 2017, 2019, 2021
- ProSound Cup: 2021
