= Neven Radaković =

Serbian footballer (born 1994)

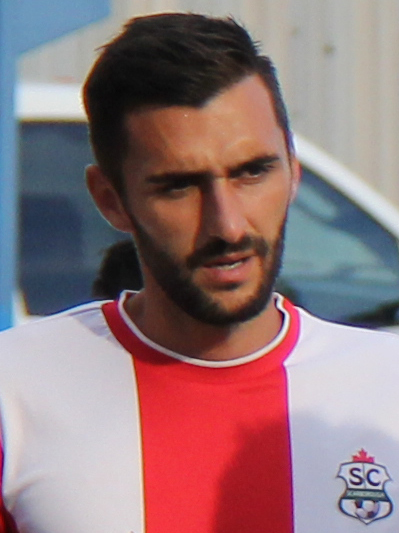
- Radaković in 2022

Personal information
- Date of birth: 12 January 1994 (age 32)
- Place of birth: Zrenjanin, FR Yugoslavia
- Height: 1.85 m (6 ft 1 in)
- Position: Defensive midfielder

Senior career*
Years	Team	Apps	(Gls)
2012–2013	Vujić Valjevo	10	(3)
2012–2014	Jedinstvo Novi Bečej	27	(1)
2014–2015	→ Polet Ljubić (loan)	10	(2)
2014–2015	Sileks	1	(0)
2015–2016	Dunav Stari Banovci	8	(0)
2015–2016	Banat Zrenjanin	15	(5)
2016–2017	Sloboda Užice	3	(0)
2017–2018	Odžaci	1	(0)
2018–2023	Scarborough SC		
- * Club domestic league appearances and goals

Neven Radaković (born 12 January 1994) is a Serbian footballer who plays as a defensive midfielder.

== Career ==
=== Europe ===
Radakovic began playing in 2012 in the Serbian League West with FK Vujić Valjevo. He later played in the Vojvodina League East with FK Jedinstvo Novi Bečej, and in 2014 was loaned to FK Polet Ljubić in the Serbian League West. In 2014, he played abroad in the Macedonian First Football League with FK Sileks. After a season abroad he played in the Serbian League Vojvodina with FK Dunav Stari Banovci, and later with FK Banat Zrenjanin. In 2016, he played in the Serbian First League with Sloboda Uzice. In his debut season in the second division, he played in 3 matches. His stint with Sloboda was short-lived as he was released in the winter of 2017. He shortly after returned to the Serbian League Vojvodina with FK Odžaci.

=== Canada ===
In 2018, Radaković played abroad for the second time in the Canadian Soccer League with Scarborough SC. In his debut season, he assisted Scarborough in securing a postseason berth by finishing fourth in the First Division. He played in the opening round of the playoffs where he contributed a goal against Hamilton City which helped the eastern Toronto side advance to the next round. He played in the CSL Championship final where Scarborough was defeated by FC Vorkuta in a penalty shootout.

He re-signed with Scarborough for the 2019 season. In his second stint with the Toronto side, the club secured a playoff berth by finishing runners-up in the division. He made further contributions in the postseason competition by recording a goal in the semifinals against Kingsman SC which sent Scarborough to the finals for the third consecutive season. Radaković was featured in the championship final where Scarborough successfully defeated FC Ukraine United for the title.

He returned to Scarborough for his third season in 2020. Throughout the regular season, he assisted the club in securing their first divisional title and featured in the championship final for the fourth consecutive season. Unfortunately, the club was defeated by a score of 2-1 to Vorkuta. His contract was renewed for the 2021 season, marking his fourth season with the club. Scarborough qualified for the playoffs where he helped the club secure their second championship title after defeating Vorkuta. He also appeared in the ProSound Cup final where the Toronto side was defeated in a penalty shootout by Vorkuta.

Radaković re-signed with Scarborough for his fifth season in 2022. He helped the eastern Toronto side secure a postseason once more by finishing third throughout the regular season. During the season the club also achieved an undefeated streak of 18 matches. In the opening round of the playoffs, he contributed a goal against BGH City FC which helped advance the club to the next round. Radaković played in Scarborough's run to the championship final, which the eastern Toronto side lost to FC Continentals (formerly FC Vorkuta).

== Honors ==
Scarborough SC

- CSL Championship: 2019, 2021
- Canadian Soccer League First Division/Regular Season: 2020, 2023
