= Stefan Rudan =

Serbian footballer

Personal information
- Date of birth: 9 January 1990 (age 36)
- Place of birth: Belgrade, SR Serbia, SFR Yugoslavia
- Height: 1.89 m (6 ft 2 1/2 in)
- Position: Defender

Senior career*
Years	Team	Apps	(Gls)
2008–2011	Bežanija		
2011–2013	OFK Bačka		
2013–2014	Đerdap	27	(2)
2014–2016	Sileks	43	(2)
2016	OFK Beograd	5	(0)
2017–2018	FK Feniks		
2018–2020	Scarborough		
- * Club domestic league appearances and goals as of 17 December 2018

Stefan Rudan (born January 9, 1990) is a Serbian footballer who plays as a defender.

== Playing career ==
Rudan signed with FK Bežanija in 2008, but shortly after was transferred to OFK Žarkovo in the Belgrade Zone League. In 2010 he played in the Serbian League Vojvodina with OFK Bačka, and later in the Serbian League Belgrade with FK Voždovac, FK Jedinstvo Ub, and FK Sopot. In 2012, he spend time in the Belgrade Zone League, and Serbian League Vojvodina with FK Palilulac Beograd, FK Senta, and with FK Đerdap in 2013.

In 2014, he played abroad in the Macedonian First Football League with FK Sileks. The following season played in the Armenian Premier League with FC Shirak. In 2016, he played in the Serbian First League with OFK Beograd, where he appeared in five matches. In 2017, was transferred to FK Bratstvo Prigrevica in the Serbian League Vojvodina. In 2018, he made his third stint abroad in the Canadian Soccer League with Scarborough SC.
