= Serhiy Melnyk (footballer, born 1988) =

Ukrainian footballer

Personal information
- Full name: Serhiy Anatoliyovych Melnyk
- Date of birth: 4 September 1988 (age 38)
- Place of birth: Odesa, Ukrainian SSR
- Height: 1.83 m (6 ft 0 in)
- Position: Defender

Youth career
- 2001–2005: DYuSSh-9 Odesa
- 2006–2009: Chornomorets Odesa

Senior career*
Years	Team	Apps	(Gls)
2009–2010	Chornomorets Odesa	5	(0)
2011	Odesa	32	(2)
2012	Nyva Vinnytsia	10	(0)
2012–2013	Sumy	31	(1)
2013–2015	Torpedo-BelAZ Zhodino	37	(1)
2015	Vitebsk	12	(0)
2016–2017	Milsami Orhei	31	(0)
2018–2021	FC Vorkuta		
- * Club domestic league appearances and goals as of 18 November 2018

Serhiy Anatoliyovych Melnyk (Ukrainian: Сергій Анатолійович Мельник); born 4 September 1988 is a Ukrainian former professional footballer.

== Playing career ==
He began his career in the Ukrainian Premier League in 2009-2010 with FC Chornomorets Odesa. He later spent time in the Ukrainian First League with FC Odesa, FC Nyva Vinnytsia, and PFC Sumy. In 2013, he played abroad in the Belarusian Premier League with FC Torpedo-BelAZ Zhodino. During his tenure in Zhodino he played in the 2014–15 UEFA Europa League against FK Kukësi. In 2015, he played with FC Vitebsk, and later in the Moldovan National Division with FC Milsami Orhei.

In 2018, he played in the Canadian Soccer League with FC Vorkuta. In 2020, he assisted Vorkuta in securing the CSL Championship by defeating Scarborough SC. In 2021, he assisted in securing Vorkuta's third regular season title, and secured the ProSound Cup against Scarborough. He also played in the 2021 playoffs where Vorkuta was defeated by Scarborough in the championship final.

== Honors ==
FC Vorkuta

- CSL Championship: 2018, 2020
- Canadian Soccer League First Division/Regular Season: 2019, 2021
- ProSound Cup: 2021
