= Valeriy Haydarzhi =

Ukrainian footballer

Personal information
- Full name: Valeriy Zakhariyovych Haydarzhi
- Date of birth: 17 December 1986 (age 39)
- Place of birth: Artsyz, Ukrainian SSR, Soviet Union
- Position: Midfielder

Senior career*
Years	Team	Apps	(Gls)
2003–2004	FC Chornomorets-2 Odesa	27	(0)
2004–2007	FC Podillya Khmelnytskyi	59	(1)
2007–2011	FC Bastion Illichivsk	52	(7)
2011–2013	FC Krystal Kherson	44	(0)
2013	FC Bastion Illichivsk	11	(0)
2015–2016	FC Zhemchuzhyna Odesa	21	(4)
2017–2019	FC Vorkuta	13	(1)
2017	→ FC Vorkuta B (loan)	3	(1)
- * Club domestic league appearances and goals as of November 10, 2017

Valeriy Haydarzhi (born December 17, 1986) is a Ukrainian footballer who plays as a midfielder.

== Career ==
Haidarzhi began his career in 2003 in the Ukrainian Second League with FC Chornomorets-2 Odesa. In 2004, he remained in the Second League by signing with FC Podillya Khmelnytskyi. He later played with FC Bastion Illichivsk, and FC Krystal Kherson. In 2015, he played in the Ukrainian Football Amateur League with FC Zhemchuzhyna Odesa.

He went abroad in 2017 to sign with FC Vorkuta in the Canadian Soccer League. Throughout the season he assisted in securing the First Division title. In his second season with Vorkuta he assisted in securing the CSL Championship. In 2019, he assisted in securing Vorkuta's second First Division title.

== Honors ==
FC Vorkuta

- CSL Championship: 2018
- Canadian Soccer League First Division: 2017, 2019
