= Dmytro Polyuhanych =

Ukrainian footballer

Personal information
- Full name: Dmytro Polyuhanych
- Date of birth: 2 June 1996 (age 30)
- Place of birth: Ukraine
- Position: Midfielder

Senior career*
Years	Team	Apps	(Gls)
2013–2017	Karpaty Lviv		
2017–2018	Skala Stryi	14	(2)
2018	Vorkuta		
2018	→ Vorkuta II (loan)	11	(6)
2019	Kingsman	16	(9)
2020–2021	Vorkuta		

International career
2012–2013	Ukraine U17	2	(1)
- * Club domestic league appearances and goals

Dmytro Polyuhanych (Ukrainian: Дмитро Миколайович Полюганич; born June 2, 1996) is a Ukrainian footballer who plays as a midfielder.

== Club career ==
=== Ukraine ===
Polyuhanych was signed by Karpaty Lviv during the 2013-14 season and was placed on the club's junior team. During the 2016 season offseason, he became more involved with the senior team and participated in a friendly tournament held in Poland.

After failing to break into the Karpaty senior team he left the organization and joined Skala Stryi in the Ukrainian Second League for the 2017-18 season. He made his professional debut on July 17, 2017, against FC Ternopil. He would record his first two goals for the club on August 5, 2017, against Podillya Khmelnytskyi. In total, he would play in 14 matches and scored 2 goals.

=== Canada ===
In 2018, Polyuhanych ventured abroad to play in the southern Ontario-based Canadian Soccer League with Vorkuta. He would primarily be featured in the league's second division with Vorkuta's reserve team and finished the regular season as the club's third-highest goal scorer with 6 goals in 11 appearances. The reserve team would secure a playoff berth by clinching the division title. In the preliminary round of the postseason, the team defeated Brantford Galaxy's reserve team to advance to the championship match. Vorkuta would successfully capture the second-division championship by defeating Halton United. Meanwhile, the senior team secured the first-division championship by defeating Scarborough SC in the finals.

After a season with Vorkuta, he signed with league expansion side Kingsman SC for the 2019 season. In his debut season, he would finish as the club's top goal scorer with 9 goals. He would also assist the expansion team in securing a playoff berth by finishing eighth in the league's first division. In the opening round of the postseason, Kingsman would defeat his former club, Vorkuta, to advance to the next round. Their playoff journey would conclude in the next round after a defeat by Scarborough.

Following his brief spell with the King City-based club, he returned to Vorkuta for the 2020 campaign. In his second season with Vorkuta, he helped the club secure a playoff spot by finishing second in the first division. Vorkuta faced the Serbian White Eagles in the opening round of the postseason and successfully defeated the Serbs. Polyuhanych would participate in the championship finals, where Vorkuta would defeat Scarborough for the championship.

The 2021 season would mark his third season with the Vorkuta organization. Throughout the initial round of the season, he would help the club claim the regular-season title and the invitational Prosound Cup. Vorkuta would make their second consecutive championship final appearance, where they lost the title to Scarborough.

== International career ==
Polyuhanych was selected to represent the Ukraine national under-17 football team in the 2013 UEFA European Under-17 Championship qualifying round. He made his debut for the youth national team on November 4, 2012, against Luxembourg where he also recorded a goal in a qualifying match.

In the winter of 2013, he was called to the under-17 national team camp by head coach Oleksandr Holovko. He was selected to the roster that competed in the next stage of the qualifying round of the youth European Championship.

== Honors ==
FC Vorkuta

- CSL Championship: 2020
- CSL II Championship: 2018
- Canadian Soccer League Regular Season: 2021
