= Serhiy Ursulenko =

Ukrainian footballer

Personal information
- Full name: Serhiy Mykolayovych Ursulenko
- Date of birth: 9 November 1987 (age 39)
- Place of birth: Odesa, Soviet Union
- Position: Midfielder

Youth career
- FC Chornomorets Odesa

Senior career*
Years	Team	Apps	(Gls)
2005–2011	KAPO Pervomayskoe		
2012	→ FC Tarutino (loan)	9	(4)
2012	→ Sovignon Tarutino (loan)	3	(0)
2012	→ Bessarabiya Odesa (loan)		
2014–2017	FC Balkany Zorya	64	(21)
2017	FC Zhemchuzhyna Odesa	2	(0)
2018–2019	FC Vorkuta	29	(14)
2021–2022	FC Vorkuta/Continentals		
2023	Dynamo Toronto		
- * Club domestic league appearances and goals

Serhiy Ursulenko (Ukrainian: Сергій Миколайович Урсуленко; born 9 November 1987) is a Ukrainian footballer who plays as a midfielder.

== Playing career ==
=== Ukraine ===
Ursulenko began his football career in 2005 with the Chornomorets Odesa academy. After he graduated from the Chernomorets academy system, he began playing in the Ukrainian Football Amateur League with FC Tarutino, Sovignon Tarutino, and Bessarabiya Odesa. In 2014, he played with Balkany Zorya, where he won the amateur title twice, and in 2016 secured promotion to the Ukrainian Second League. He re-signed with Balkany and debuted in the country's third division the following season.

In his debut season in the Second League, he assisted the team in securing promotion to the Ukrainian First League in 2017. He also finished as the club's top goal scorer with 14 goals. The following season, he was transferred to Zhemchuzhyna Odesa, where he appeared in two matches.

=== Canada ===
In 2018, he went abroad to play in the Canadian Soccer League with FC Vorkuta. He helped Vorkuta secure a postseason berth by finishing second in the league's first division. In the playoffs, he contributed a goal in the semifinal match against SC Waterloo Region, which helped Vorkuta reach the CSL Championship final. In the championship finals, Vorkuta defeated Scarborough SC.

The following season, he assisted in securing the First Division title. In 2021, he returned to his former club Vorkuta. He assisted in securing Vorkuta's third regular-season title and secured the ProSound Cup against Scarborough. He also played in the 2021 playoffs, where Vorkuta was defeated by Scarborough in the championship final.

In 2022, Vorkuta was renamed FC Continentals, and he re-signed with the club for the season. Throughout the season, he helped the Continentals secure a playoff berth by finishing fourth in the standings. He made his third championship final appearance against Scarborough once more, where he won his second championship title.

Following Continental's hiatus in 2023, he signed with the expansion franchise Dynamo Toronto.

== Honors ==
FC Balkany Zorya

- Ukrainian Association of Amateur Football: 2015, 2016

FC Vorkuta

- CSL Championship: 2018, 2022
- Canadian Soccer League First Division/Regular Season: 2019, 2021
- ProSound Cup: 2021
