= Mykhaylo Ryabyi =

Ukrainian footballer

Personal information
- Full name: Mykhaylo Ivanovych Ryabyi
- Date of birth: 5 September 1983 (age 43)
- Place of birth: Doroshivtsi, Soviet Union (now Ukraine)
- Position: Midfielder

Senior career*
Years	Team	Apps	(Gls)
2001–2002	Bukovyna Chernivtsi	2	(0)
2004	Dnister Zalishchyky	20	(6)
2007–2009	Bukovyna Chernivtsi	59	(7)
2009–2010	Nyva Ternopil	11	(0)
2010–2012	Polonia Przemyśl	36	(3)
2013	Karpaty Kolomyia	9	(3)
2014	Polonia Przemyśl	14	(1)
2014	Karpaty Kolomyia	17	(1)
2015	Dnister Zalishchyky	1	(0)
2016–2017	Nyva Ternopil	33	(1)
2016–2017	Nyva Terebovlya	14	(1)
2017–2018	Vorkuta	22	(4)
2018–2020	Dnister Zalishchyky		
2020–2021	Vilkhivtsi		
- * Club domestic league appearances and goals

Mykhaylo Ivanovych Ryabyi (Ukrainian: Миха́йло Іван́ович Ряби́й; born 5 September 1983) is a Ukrainian former professional footballer who played as a midfielder.

== Club career ==
=== Early career ===
Riaby was a graduate of the youth system of Bukovina Chernivtsi. In 2002, he joined the professional ranks by playing for Bukovina in the Ukrainian Second League. In 2004, he played for Dnister Zalishchyky in the Ternopil regional league, where he helped the club win the league title.

In 2007, he returned to the professional level to play with his former team, Bukovyna Chernivtsi. After two seasons with Bukovyna, he joined Nyva Ternopil to play in the Ukrainian First League.

Following his departure from Ternopil, he played in the Chernivtsi regional league with Dnister Doroshivtsi and was named the league's best player.

=== Polonia Przemyśl ===
In 2010, Riabyi ventured abroad to secure a contract with Polonia Przemyśl in the Polish III liga. After the conclusion of the season, he had an unsuccessful trial with I liga side Kolejarz Stróże. Following his trial with Kolejarz Stróże, he returned to play for Polonia.

=== Poland ===
After several seasons in the regional Ukrainian circuits, he returned to Poland in 2013 to sign with Polonia Przemyśl.

=== Return to Ukraine ===
After his stint abroad, he returned to the Ukrainian regional level to play with Karpaty Kolomyia and Dnister Zalishchyky.

In 2016, he returned to his former club, Nyva Ternopil, to compete in the national amateur league. Riabyi helped Nyva win the Ternopil regional league cup tournament. He was also named the tournament's best player. He left Ternopil midway through the season to sign with league rivals Nyva Terebovlya for the remainder of the season.

=== Canada ===
In 2017, Riabyi played abroad in the Canadian Soccer League with FC Vorkuta. He helped the club win the league's first division title, along with a playoff berth. Their playoff journey would conclude in the second round after a defeat by Scarborough SC. He re-signed with Vorkuta for the 2018 season. Riabyi helped Vorkuta secure a playoff berth by finishing second in the division. He appeared in the championship final, where Vorkuta defeated Scarborough.

=== Later career ===
After two seasons in Canada, he returned to his former club Dnister Zalishchyky in 2019.

== Futsal career ==
Riabyi began playing futsal in 2012 with Merkury Chernivtsi in the Ukrainian Futsal Championship. In 2018, he played for Urozhay Chernivtsi, where he was nominated for the league's player of the year. He re-signed with Urozhay Chernivtsi the following season, where he served as the team captain.

In 2023, Riabyi played in the American-based National Futsal Premier League with FC Tryzub. In his debut season in the American circuit, he helped the club win its divisional title.

== Honours ==
Dnister Zalishchyky

- Chernivtsi Oblast Championship: 2004

Nyva Ternopil

- Ternopil Oblast Cup: 2016

FC Vorkuta

- CSL Championship: 2018
- Canadian Soccer League First Division: 2017
