= Kavin Bryan =

Jamaican international footballer (born 1984)

Personal information
- Date of birth: 7 February 1984 (age 42)
- Place of birth: Kingston, Jamaica
- Height: 1.80 m (5 ft 11 in)
- Position: Striker

Senior career*
Years	Team	Apps	(Gls)
2004–2006	Police Nationals		
2006–2011	Harbour View		(34)
2009	→ Notodden (loan)	22	(1)
2011	Sông Lam Nghệ An	12	(7)
2012	Hai Phong	21	(5)
2013	Sông Lam Nghệ An	22	(8)
2014	Vissai Ninh Bình		
2014–2016	Hanoi	7	(1)
2015–2016	Harbour View	2	(0)
2017	York Region Shooters	12	(5)
2018–2022	Scarborough SC	32	(16)

International career^{‡}
2007–2012	Jamaica	10	(1)
- * Club domestic league appearances and goals as of 2:37, 5 October 2019 (UTC) ‡ National team caps and goals as of 13:45, 9 March 2013 (UTC)

Kavin Bryan (born 7 February 1984) is a Jamaican former international footballer who played as a striker.

== Club career ==
=== Jamaica ===
Bryan began his professional career in the KSAFA Super League in 2005 with Rae Town. His stint with Rae Town lasted three months, and he was transferred to Police Nationals during the winter transfer window. In the summer of 2006, he played in the Jamaican top-tier league by signing with Harbour View. In his debut season in the national league, he finished second in the scoring charts with 17 goals and assisted the club in securing the championship.

He re-signed with Harbour View the following season and contributed a goal in the quarterfinal match of the 2007 CFU Club Championship tournament against Portmore United. He also played in the final match of the Caribbean tournament, where Harbour View defeated Joe Public for the championship. In his third season with Harbour View, he appeared in the opening round of the 2008–09 CONCACAF Champions League, where they were defeated by Club Universidad Nacional.

In April 2009, he played abroad in Norway's 1. divisjon on a loan deal to Notodden FK. After a season in Scandinavia, he returned to the Jamaican top tier to resume play with Harbour View for the 2009-10 season. Throughout the season, he helped the Kingston-based club secure another league title. He returned for his fifth season with the club the following year. Though he had a shortened season in Jamaica, he returned to finish the 2010-11 campaign once his loan deal ended around November 2011.

=== Vietnam ===
His fifth season with Harbour View was shortened as he was loaned out abroad to the Vietnamese V.League 1 for Sông Lam Nghệ An. The club went on to claim the league title. He also played in the 2011 AFC Cup, where he recorded 3 goals in 3 appearances. In May 2011, Bryan broke his fibula while playing for Sông Lam Nghệ An. After failing to come to terms with Song Lam Nghe An, he departed after the conclusion of the season.

He returned to Vietnam for the 2012 season, where he secured a deal with Vicem Hai Phong. His tenure with Hai Phong lasted a single season as he departed from the club the following year. Bryan would return to his former team, Sông Lam Nghệ An, in 2013. He would appear in 22 matches and record 8 goals throughout the season. For the 2014 season, he signed with Vissai Ninh Bình. During his stint with Vissai Ninh Binh, he had another run in the Asian continental tournament.

In May 2014, Bryan left Vissai Ninh Bình for V.League 2 side Hanoi after the club was dissolved due to a match-fixing scandal. After a five-year run in Asia, he returned to his former club Harbour View for the 2015-16 season. He received another attempt in early 2016 to return to the Vietnamese top tier after securing a trial run with Dong Thap.

=== Canada ===
In 2017, he played in the Canadian Soccer League with York Region Shooters. Bryan assisted the Vaughan-based team in securing a postseason berth by finishing third in the league's first division. In the second round of the playoffs, he contributed a goal against the Serbian White Eagles, which advanced the club to the CSL Championship. York Region would successfully win the championship title after defeating Scarborough SC in a penalty shootout.

Bryan returned to the Canadian circuit the following season to play with Scarborough after York Region transferred several of their players to the eastern Toronto side. He helped Scarborough secure a playoff berth and scored a goal in the playoff semifinal match against FC Ukraine United. He would participate in the championship final, where Scarborough was defeated in a penalty shootout by FC Vorkuta. Bryan returned to Scarborough for his sophomore season in 2019. He assisted the club in securing a postseason berth by finishing second in the top division. He would play in his third championship final, where Scarborough defeated Ukraine United for the title.

In 2020, he re-signed with Scarborough and assisted in securing the league's first division title. He returned to sign with Scarborough for his fifth season in 2022.

== International career ==
Bryan was named to the Jamaican Olympic Team by head coach Wendell Downswell to participate in the 2007 Lunar New Year Cup.

He was called up to the senior national team to face Switzerland in a friendly match in 2007. He officially made his international debut on 22 March 2007, coming on as a substitute in the match against Switzerland. Bryan was originally selected to represent the national team in the 2011 CONCACAF Gold Cup but withdrew after sustaining a leg injury while playing with Sông Lam Nghệ An.

He recorded his first international goal on 11 August 2010, against Trinidad and Tobago. Bryan returned to the national program in a 2014 FIFA World Cup qualification match on 7 September 2012, against the United States. He also played in the return match against the United States on 11 September 2012. In total, he made 10 appearances and recorded 1 goal on the international level.

== Honours ==
Harbour View

- CFU Club Championship: 2007
- National Premier League: 2006–07, 2009–10

Scarborough SC

- CSL Championship: 2019

York Region Shooters

- CSL Championship: 2017
