= SC Real Mississauga =

Canadian semi-professional soccer club

Real Mississauga
- Full name: SC Real Mississauga
- Founded: 2018
- Dissolved: 2020
- Stadium: Hershey Centre
- Founder: Krum Bibishkov
- League: Canadian Soccer League
- Website: https://www.screalmississauga.ca/

SC Real Mississauga was a Canadian soccer club based in Mississauga, Ontario that played in the Canadian Soccer League.

== History ==
The club joined the Canadian Soccer League in 2018 with a team in the First Division. The club was originally formed as an academy by Krum Bibishkov. Bibishkov would also serve as the head coach for the 2018 season. Goalkeeper Senad Poračanin scored the opening goal in a 2–0 victory over Brantford Galaxy on September 7, 2018, on a penalty kick. They finished their debut season in seventh place in the nine-team league, qualifying for the playoffs. Their playoff run ended in the first round of the postseason. where FC Vorkuta eliminated them. The club also provided free soccer workshops to Dufferin-Peel Catholic District School Board students.

Bibishkov would continue as the head coach for the 2019 season. Mississauga would fail to secure a playoff berth after finishing ninth in the divisional standings. In the following season, the COVID-19 pandemic delayed the season's commencement and resulted in several teams opting out. Initially, Mississauga was included in the delayed schedule, but the schedule was further delayed, and the club was not in the revised schedule. Mississauga failed to return to the league after the pandemic, with the club founder, Bibishkov, also leaving and returning to Bulgaria.

== Head coaches ==
- Krum Bibishkov (2018–2019)

== Seasons ==
Men

Season	League	Teams	Record	Rank	Playoffs	Ref
2018	Canadian Soccer League (First Division)	9	3–2–11	7th	Quarter-final	
2019	Canadian Soccer League (First Division)	10	3–2–13	9th	Did not qualify	
