= 2019 Canadian Soccer League season =

Professional soccer league season

Canadian Soccer League
- Season: 2019
- Dates: May 19 – October 5 (regular season); October 12 – October 26 (playoffs)
- Champions: FC Vorkuta (First Division regular season); Scarborough SC (First Division playoffs, 1st title)
- Matches: 90
- Goals: 374 (4.16 per match)
- Top goalscorer: Mykola Temnyuk (18)
- Biggest home win: FC Vorkuta 7–2 CSC Mississauga (June 8, 2019); FC Vorkuta 7–0 SC Real Mississauga (June 15, 2019)
- Biggest away win: Real Mississauga SC 1–8 CSC Mississauga (August 3. 2019)
- Longest winning run: 8 matches FC Vorkuta
- Longest unbeaten run: 18 matches FC Vorkuta
- Longest winless run: 4 matches Brantford Galaxy
- Longest losing run: 6 matches Brantford Galaxy

The 2019 Canadian Soccer League season was the 22nd season under the Canadian Soccer League name. The season started on May 19, 2019, and concluded on October 26, 2019, with the CSL Championship final. Fixtures for the 2019 season were announced on April 30, 2019. The final consisted of Scarborough SC defeating FC Ukraine United at Centennial Park Stadium in Toronto, Ontario, to claim their first championship title. The First Division title went to FC Vorkuta along with the Second Division title and the championship. The single new addition to the First Division was Kingsman SC, and the departures occurred in the Second Division with Halton United, London City, and Milton SC becoming founding members of the Canadian Academy of Soccer League (CASL).

== Summary ==
Scarborough SC was the highlight of the season as they claimed their first CSL Championship after two previous consecutive attempts at the title. Throughout the regular season, the eastern Toronto team was a consistent challenger to Vorkuta and finished as runners-up in the league's first division. They retained the services of Zoran Rajović as head coach and continued in the status quo of acquiring imports to maintain competitiveness with the major clubs.

FC Vorkuta continued in their standard of recruiting talent from Ukraine, and as a result, achieved a league milestone of three titles (First & Second division titles, and the DII Championship). The club became the fourth club in league history, after York Region Shooters in the 2014 season, to achieve an undefeated regular season. A surprising early defeat to Kingsman SC in the early round of the postseason eliminated their chance of acquiring a perfect season. Only the Toronto Olympians and York Region Shooters accomplished this feat in the top division.

The third position in the First Division was primarily contested between FC Ukraine United, SC Waterloo Region, and Serbian White Eagles. The White Eagles held the position for fourteen weeks straight before relinquishing in the final three weeks to SC Waterloo and ultimately to Ukraine United. The Etobicoke-based team experienced a tumultuous season as general manager Vladimir Koval and newly appointed head coach Mykhailo Hurka struggled in coordinating the usage of import players as they were fulfilling their commitments in Europe. Injuries were also a factor in the team's performance, but late in the season, the club acquired several new players, with Molham Babouli being the most notable domestic acquisition. As a result, Ukraine United secured third place in the division and reached the championship final.

SC Waterloo and Serbian White Eagles both strengthened their core veteran squad with additional imports from the Western Balkans. Throughout the majority of the season, the White Eagles held the third position, but a series of defeats late in the season allowed Waterloo to briefly secure the position until finishing fourth with a higher differential in scoring. Waterloo managed to hold the highly contested third position from Serbia three times throughout the season, and after winning six of its last seven games, usurped the position permanently until the final match of the season, with Ukraine United firmly securing the spot. Both Waterloo and Serbia competed in the postseason, with the former reaching the second round and the latter facing an earlier departure in the first round, respectively.

The final three playoff berths were contested among CSC Mississauga, Hamilton City, and Kingsman SC. Kingsman SC, an expansion franchise, held the sixth position for the majority of the season and enjoyed the benefit of acquiring seasoned imports from FC Vorkuta. After battling Kingsman for the sixth position, Hamilton managed to steal the spot in the final stages of the regular season campaign. The town north of Vaughan accomplished a major upset in the postseason after handing Vorkuta its first defeat of the season. Subsequently, Kingsman was eliminated in the second round by Scarborough. CSC Mississauga continued its focus on player development but followed the standard of the league's dominant clubs by attracting some foreign talent to remain competitive. Its efforts were effective as the franchise secured its first playoff berth by finishing seventh with a higher goal differential than Kingsman.

While the two remaining clubs were Brantford Galaxy, and SC Real Mississauga finishing in the tenth, and ninth positions. Brantford retained their veterans for the season, but struggled in making an impact and primarily was situated at the bottom of the standings the entire season. Real Mississauga produced a similar result as Brantford finishing just three points ahead in the standings.

== First Division ==
=== Changes from 2018 ===
During the off-season, former SC Toronto founder and league equity owner Isac Cambas died on March 1, 2019, from cancer. The season commenced with all nine teams from the 2018 season returning, with the approval of a single expansion team from five applicants. The changes confirmed at the 2019 annual general meeting of team owners were the introduction of professional soccer to King, Ontario, with Kingsman SC fielding teams in the First & Second divisions. Originally, the league released a press release announcing the return of professional soccer to Niagara Falls, Ontario, under the name Niagara FC, with former league veteran Timotej Zakrajsek and Tamara Samardzija as the driving forces behind the bid. Unfortunately, the project failed to materialize as the club didn't make its debut.

Changes occurred in the CSL executive committee and staff, with Serbian White Eagles president Dragan Bakoc serving as the league's president. Meanwhile, the Second Division fielded six teams for the 2019 season. Several departing clubs became founding members of the Canadian Academy of Soccer League (CASL), a new professional league centered in Milton, Ontario, with Milton SC owner Jasmin Halkic initiating the operation along with the additions of Halton United and London City.

=== Teams ===
Team	City	Stadium	Manager
Brantford Galaxy	Brantford, Ontario	Heritage Field Turf	Milan Prpa
CSC Mississauga	Mississauga, Ontario	Paramount Fine Foods Centre Fields	Josip Raguz
FC Ukraine United	Toronto, Ontario (Etobicoke)	Centennial Park Stadium	Mykhaylo Hurka
FC Vorkuta	Vaughan, Ontario (Woodbridge)	Ontario Soccer Centre	
Hamilton City	Hamilton, Ontario (Stoney Creek)	Heritage Field Turf	Sasa Vukovic
Kingsman SC	King, Ontario	Esther Shiner Stadium	Oleg Kalyadin
Real Mississauga SC	Mississauga, Ontario	Huron Park Soccer Field	Krum Bibishkov
Scarborough SC	Toronto, Ontario (Scarborough)	Birchmount Stadium	Zoran Rajović
Serbian White Eagles	Toronto, Ontario (Etobicoke)	Centennial Park Stadium	Uroš Stamatović
SC Waterloo Region	Waterloo, Ontario (Eastbridge)	RIM Park	Radivoj Panić

Location of First Division teams outside of Toronto for the 2019 CSL season.
First Division
Location of First Division teams in Toronto for the 2019 CSL season.
First Division

=== Standings ===
Pos	Team	Pld	W	D	L	GF	GA	GD	Pts	Qualification
1	FC Vorkuta (C)	18	15	3	0	66	15	+51	48	Playoffs
2	Scarborough SC (O)	18	12	3	3	50	18	+32	39	Playoffs
3	FC Ukraine United	18	10	2	6	43	22	+21	32	Playoffs
4	SC Waterloo Region	18	10	1	7	41	25	+16	31	Playoffs
5	Serbian White Eagles	18	9	4	5	42	33	+9	31	Playoffs
6	Hamilton City	18	6	3	9	26	39	−13	21	Playoffs
7	CSC Mississauga	18	6	1	11	38	47	−9	19	Playoffs
8	Kingsman SC	18	6	1	11	30	48	−18	19	Playoffs
9	SC Real Mississauga	18	3	2	13	20	62	−42	11	
10	Brantford Galaxy	18	2	2	14	18	65	−47	8	

Source: []
Rules for classification: 1) points; 2) goal difference; 3) number of goals scored.
(C) Champions; (O) Play-off winners

=== Positions by round ===
Team ╲ Round	1	2	3	4	5	6	7	8	9	10	11	12	13	14	15	16	17	18	19	20
Brantford Galaxy	7	8	9	10	10	10	10	10	10	10	10	9	10	10	10	10	10	10	10	10
CSC Mississauga	10	10	10	6	7	8	8	9	8	8	7	7	7	8	8	8	7	7	6	7
FC Ukraine United	5	5	5	5	4	5	6	4	6	4	4	6	5	4	5	4	4	5	4	3
FC Vorkuta	2	2	2	1	1	1	1	1	1	1	1	1	1	1	1	1	1	1	1	1
Hamilton City SC	9	9	7	7	6	7	7	7	7	7	8	8	8	7	7	7	8	8	8	6
Kingsman SC	8	6	6	8	9	6	5	6	4	6	5	5	6	6	6	6	6	6	7	8
SC Real Mississauga	6	7	8	9	8	9	9	8	9	9	9	10	9	9	9	9	9	9	9	9
Scarborough SC	4	1	1	2	2	2	2	2	2	2	2	2	2	2	2	2	2	2	2	2
SC Waterloo Region	1	4	3	4	5	4	4	5	5	5	6	4	4	5	4	5	5	3	3	4
Serbian White Eagles	3	3	4	3	3	3	3	3	3	3	3	3	3	3	3	3	3	4	5	5

Updated to match(es) played on October 6, 2019. Source:

=== Playoffs ===
==== Quarterfinals ====
October 12, 2019	FC Vorkuta	2–2 (a.e.t.) (2–4 p)	Kingsman SC	Vaughan, Ontario
18:00	Temnyuk; Volchkov	Report	Oleksandr Alieksieiev; Bortnik	Stadium: Ontario Soccer Centre

October 12, 2019	Scarborough SC	2–1 (a.e.t.)	CSC Mississauga	Toronto, Ontario
18:00	Gonzalo Matias Cabrera Celis,	Report	Berezovyi	Stadium: Birchmount Stadium

October 12, 2019	SC Waterloo Region	1–1 (a.e.t.) (5–4 p)	Serbian White Eagles	Waterloo, Ontario
19:00	Miodrag Kovacevic 55'	Report	Tadic 71'	Stadium: RIM Park

October 13, 2019	FC Ukraine United	1–1 (a.e.t.) (4–3 p)	Hamilton City SC	Toronto, Ontario
16:00	Babouli 7'	Report	Stojanović 48'	Stadium: Centennial Park Stadium; Referee: Tony Amaral

==== Semifinals ====
October 19, 2019	Scarborough SC	4–2	Kingsman SC	Toronto, Ontario
16:00	Gonzalo Matius Cabrera Celis; Radakovic; Rajović; Simpson	Report	Belmokhtar,	Stadium: Birchmount Stadium

October 20, 2019	FC Ukraine United	5–3	SC Waterloo Region	Toronto, Ontario
16:00	Milishchuk 20'; Ihor Sorotoskyi 34'; Nuno Ponte 64'; Babouli 75'; Rick Di Vincenzo 90'	Report	Žugelj 39'; Petar Dordevic 47'; Dado Hadrovic 53'	Stadium: Centennial Park Stadium

==== Finals ====
October 26, 2019	Scarborough SC	2–0	FC Ukraine United	Toronto, Ontario
15:00	Stojiljkovic,	Report		Stadium: Centennial Park Stadium; Referee: Norman Oliveira

=== Season statistics ===
==== Goals ====
Rank	Player	Club	Goals
1	(Ukraine) Mykola Temnyuk	FC Vorkuta	18
2	(Serbia) Aleksandar Stojiljković	Scarborough SC	13
3	(Serbia) Vladimir Strizovic	Serbian White Eagles	10
4	(Syria) Molham Babouli	FC Ukraine United	9
4	(Montenegro) Miodrag Kovacevic	SC Waterloo Region	9
4	(Ukraine) Dmytro Polyuhanych	Kingsman SC	9
5	(Ukraine) Said Belmokhtar	Kingsman SC	8
5	(Chile) Gonzalo Matias	Scarborough SC	8
5	(Serbia) Marko Stajic	Serbian White Eagles	8
6	(Jamaica) Kavin Bryan	Scarborough SC	7
6	(Ukraine) Yaroslav Solonynko	FC Vorkuta	7
7	Aleksander Bozovic	SC Waterloo Region	6
7	(Ukraine) Taras Kryvyi	FC Ukraine United	6
7	(Croatia) Pero Menalo	CSC Mississauga	6
7	(Serbia) Zoran Rajović	Scarborough SC	6
7	(Ukraine) Serhiy Ursulenko	FC Vorkuta	6

==== Hat-tricks ====
Player	Club	Against	Result	Date
(Ukraine) Taras Kryvyi	FC Ukraine United	CSC Mississauga	3–0 (A)	31 May 2019
(Ukraine) Yaroslav Solonynko	FC Vorkuta	Brantford Galaxy	6–0 (H)	1 June 2019
(Chile) Gonzalo Matias	Scarborough SC	SC Real Mississauga	5–1 (A)	8 June 2019
(Ukraine) Mykola Temniuk	FC Vorkuta	SC Real Mississauga	7–0 (H)	15 June 2019
Matthias Garcia	CSC Mississauga	Kingsman SC	4–0 (A)	16 June 2019
(Ukraine) Mykola Temniuk	FC Vorkuta	SC Waterloo Region	5–1 (H)	22 June 2019
(Serbia) Aleksandar Bozovic	SC Waterloo Region	SC Real Mississauga	4–3 (A)	29 June 2019
(Ukraine) Pavlo Lukyanets	FC Ukraine United	CSC Mississauga	5–2 (H)	14 July 2019
(Serbia) Vladimir Strizovic	Serbian White Eagles	Brantford Galaxy	6–3 (H)	26 July 2019
(Ukraine) Said Belmokhtar	Kingsman SC	Serbian White Eagles	4–2 (H)	3 August 2019
(Serbia) Aleksander Stojiljkovic	Scarborough SC	Kingsman SC	3–3 (A)	10 August 2019
(Canada) Molham Babouli	FC Ukraine United	Brantford Galaxy	5–0 (H)	8 September 2019
(Serbia) Aleksander Stojiljkovic	Scarborough SC	Brantford Galaxy	6–1 (A)	14 September 2019
(Canada) Molham Babouli	FC Ukraine United	SC Real Mississauga	5–2 (H)	1 October 2019

== Second Division ==
The Second Division remained the same as the previous season, with six teams. The new additions were the reserve teams of CSC Mississauga, Hamilton City, and Kingsman SC. The departing clubs were Halton United, London City, and Milton SC to become inaugural members of the Canadian Academy of Soccer League (CASL), thus making the Second Division primarily a reserve division for its senior clubs. FC Vorkuta B successfully defended its championship and division title for the second consecutive season.

Canadian Soccer League Second Division
- Season: 2019
- Champions: FC Vorkuta B (Second Division regular season); FC Vorkuta B (Second Division playoffs, 2nd title)
- Matches: 45
- Goals: 251 (5.58 per match)
- Top goalscorer: Marko Stajic (13)
- Biggest home win: FC Vorkuta B 11–1 Serbian White Eagles B (June 22, 2019)
- Biggest away win: Kingsman SC B 2–12 FC Vorkuta B (September 25, 2019)
- Longest winning run: 9 matches FC Vorkuta B
- Longest unbeaten run: 9 matches FC Vorkuta B
- Longest winless run: 4 matches Brantford Galaxy B
- Longest losing run: 6 matches Hamilton City SC B

=== Teams ===
Team	City	Stadium	Manager
Brantford Galaxy B	Brantford, Ontario	Cardinal Newman S.S. Field (Stoney Creek, Hamilton)	
CSC Mississauga B	Mississauga, Ontario	Ontario Soccer Centre (Woodbridge, Vaughan)	
FC Vorkuta B	Vaughan, Ontario	St. Robert S.S. Field	
Hamilton City SC B	Hamilton, Ontario	Cardinal Newman S.S. Field (Stoney Creek, Hamilton)	
Kingsman SC B	King, Ontario	Ontario Soccer Centre (Woodbridge, Vaughan)	
Serbian White Eagles B	Toronto, Ontario	Iceland Sports Complex (Mississauga)	

Location of Second Division teams outside of Toronto for the 2019 CSL season.
Second Division
Location of Second Division teams in Toronto for the 2019 CSL season.
Second Division

=== Standings ===
Pos	Team	Pld	W	D	L	GF	GA	GD	Pts	Qualification
1	FC Vorkuta B (C, O)	15	13	0	2	74	19	+55	39	Playoffs
2	Serbian White Eagles B	15	8	1	6	56	57	−1	25	Playoffs
3	CSC Mississauga B	15	7	2	6	38	45	−7	23	Playoffs
4	Kingsman SC B	15	4	4	7	27	41	−14	16	Playoffs
5	Hamilton City SC B	15	3	4	8	28	36	−8	13	Playoffs
6	Brantford Galaxy B	15	3	3	9	28	48	−20	12	Playoffs

Updated to match(es) played on October 3, 2019. Source: http://canadiansoccerleague.ca/2019-second-division-standings/
Rules for classification: 1) points; 2) goal difference; 3) number of goals scored.
(C) Champions; (O) Play-off winners

=== Positions by round ===
Team ╲ Round	1	2	3	4	5	6	7	8	9	10	11	12	13	14	15
Brantford Galaxy B	5	5	6	6	6	6	6	6	6	6	6	6	6	6	6
CSC Mississauga B	4	4	3	3	4	2	3	3	3	3	3	3	3	3	3
FC Vorkuta B	1	2	2	1	1	1	1	1	1	1	1	1	1	1	1
Hamilton City SC B	2	3	4	5	5	5	5	5	5	4	4	4	5	5	5
Kingsman SC B	3	1	1	2	3	4	4	4	4	5	5	5	4	4	4
Serbian White Eagles B	6	6	5	4	2	3	2	2	2	2	2	2	2	2	2

Updated to match(es) played on October 4, 2019. Source:

=== Playoffs ===
==== Quarterfinals ====
October 15, 2019	CSC Mississauga B	1–0	Brantford Galaxy B	Mississauga, Ontario
21:00	Matthaus Garcia	Report		Stadium: Paramount Fine Foods Centre

October 15, 2019	Kingsman SC B	2–3	Hamilton City SC B	Toronto, Ontario
21:00	Pitel 75', 85'	Report	Arsen Platis 30'; Marco Serlez 50'; Illija Bajcetic 70'	Stadium: Esther Shiner Stadium

==== Semifinals ====
October 19, 2019	FC Vorkuta B	5–1	Hamilton City SC B	Toronto, Ontario
13:30	Kristijan Kezic 58', 70'; Oleksandr Yaremchuk 63'; Borovskyi 66', 80'	Report	Haris Osmanagic 50'	Stadium: L'Amoreaux Sports Complex

October 19, 2019	Serbian White Eagles B	2–0	CSC Mississauga B	Toronto, Ontario
14:00	Vladimir Strizovic 22'; Luka Milidragovic 37'	Report		Stadium: Centennial Park Stadium

==== Finals ====
October 26, 2019	FC Vorkuta B	2–0	Serbian White Eagles B	Toronto, Ontario
13:00	Temnyuk 80'; Yanchuk 92'	Report		Stadium: Centennial Park Stadium

=== Top Goal Scorers ===
Rank	Player	Club	Goals
1	(Serbia) Marko Stajic	Serbian White Eagles B	13
2	(Canada) Matthaus Garcia	CSC Mississauga SC B	11
2	(Serbia) Vladimir Strizovic	Serbian White Eagles B	11
3	(Israel) Fadi Salback	FC Vorkuta B	9
4	Pat Wilson	Brantford Galaxy B	6
5	(Ukraine) Bohdan Borovskyi	FC Vorkuta B	5
6	(Canada) Donart Beqiri	Brantford Galaxy B	4
6	(Ukraine) Bogdan Bortnik	Kingsman SC B	4
6	(Croatia) Kristijan Kezic	FC Vorkuta B	4
6	(Canada) Misel Klisara	Serbian White Eagles B	4
7	Marko Dzaric	Hamilton City SC B	3
7	(Ukraine) Serhiy Ivlyev	FC Vorkuta B	3
7	Vukasin Kovacevic	Hamilton City SC B	3
7	(Ukraine) Danylo Lazar	FC Vorkuta B	3
7	(Ukraine) Ihor Melnyk	FC Vorkuta B	3
7	Marko Milanovic	Serbian White Eagles B	3
7	(Ukraine) Yaroslav Solonynko	FC Vorkuta B	3
7	(Serbia) Đorđe Vukobrat	Hamilton City SC B	3
