= Bohdan Riabets =

Ukrainian footballer

Personal information
- Full name: Bohdan Anatoliyovych Riabets
- Date of birth: 1 November 1991 (age 34)
- Place of birth: Ukraine
- Position: Forward

Senior career*
Years	Team	Apps	(Gls)
2013	Shakhtar Rodinskoe	2	(1)
2014	USK-Rubin Donetsk	1	(0)
2015	FC Legion Kyiv	15	(8)
2016	Sluch Starokostiantyniv	17	(20)
2017–2018	FC Avanhard Kramatorsk	6	(0)
2018–2019	FC Vorkuta	14	(5)
2019	Iskra Teofipol	6	(1)
2019–2020	Nyva Terebovlya	2	(0)
2019–2020	Sevan	9	(2)
2019–2020	Dilijan	1	(0)
2022–2023	Schaffhausen	4	(0)
- * Club domestic league appearances and goals

Bohdan Riabets (Ukrainian: Богдан Анатолійович Рябець; born 1 November 1991) is a Ukrainian footballer who plays as a forward.

== Club career ==
=== Early career ===
Riabets played in the Luhansk and Donetsk regional leagues with USK-Rubin Donetsk and Shakhtar Rodinskoe. In 2015, he played with FC Legion Kyiv. The following season, he signed with Sluch Starokostiantyniv in the Khmelnytskyi regional league, where he finished second in the league scoring charts. Once the season concluded, he was named the league's best forward.

Riabets joined the professional ranks in 2017 by signing with Avanhard Kramatorsk in the Ukrainian First League. His tenure with Avanhard was short-lived as he was released in December. He appeared in six matches for the club.

=== Canada ===
In the summer of 2018, he played abroad in the Canadian Soccer League with FC Vorkuta. Riabets debuted for the club on May 13, 2018, against FC Ukraine United. He scored his goal for Vorkuta on May 19. 2018 against Hamilton City. In his debut season in the Canadian circuit, he helped Vorkuta secure a playoff berth by finishing second in the league's first division. He appeared in the championship final, where Vorkuta defeated Scarborough SC.

=== Ukraine ===
After a season abroad, he returned to the Khmelnytskyi regional league to play with Iskra Teofipol. For the remainder of the season, he played with Nyva Terebovlya.

=== Armenia ===
In the fall of 2019, he signed with Sevan in the Armenian First League. He made his debut in the Armenian Cup on November 2, 2019, against Yerevan. His tenure with Sevan was brief, as he played the remainder of the season with Dilijan. In 2022, he played for Swiss side SV Schaffhausen.

== Honors ==
FC Vorkuta

- CSL Championship: 2018
