= FC Dynamo Khmelnytskyi (2009) =

- Full name: FC Dynamo Khmelnytskyi
- Founded: 2009
- Dissolved: 2013
- Ground: SC Podillya
- Capacity: 12,000
- Chairman: Valeriy Krokhan
- Head Coach: Vadym Krokhan
- League: Druha Liha
- 2013–14: 19th (withdrew)

FC Dynamo Khmelnytskyi was a Ukrainian football team based in Khmelnytskyi, Khmelnytskyi Oblast, Ukraine. The club withdrew from the Professional Football League during the 2013–14 Ukrainian Second League season due to their financial situation.

== History ==
On 2 March 2009 the PFL Bureau received an appeal from a communal company "FC "Podillya-Khmelnytskyi" (city of Khmelnytskyi) of 21 January 2009 that it withdraws from the Professional Football League of Ukraine and handing over its rights and duties according to the Agreement on Succession to a limited liability company "PFC "Dynamo" (city of Khmelnytskyi)". (Note: Ukrainian: 2 березня 2009 року № 3 «Про заяву Комунального підприємства «Футбольний клуб «Поділля - Хмельницький» м. Хмельницький від 21 січня 2009 року № 98 щодо виходу клубу зі складу Професіональної футбольної ліги України та про передачу своїх прав та обов'язків за Договором про правонаступництво Товариству з обмеженою відповідальністю «Професійний футбольний клуб «Динамо» м. Хмельницький», transl. March 2, 2009 No. 3 "On the application of the Municipal Enterprise 'Football Club 'Podillia - Khmelnytskyi'' of Khmelnytskyi, dated January 21, 2009 No. 98, regarding the club's withdrawal from the Professional Football League of Ukraine and the transfer of its rights and obligations under the Succession Agreement to the Limited Liability Company 'Professional Football Club 'Dynamo' of Khmelnytskyi.")

In the season (2008–09) in Druha Liha A this football club started out as a subsection of the association Dynamo athletic franchise and they finished it in 8th place in his group.

== Managers ==
- (Ukraine) Volodymyr Reva (2009)
- (Ukraine) Viktor Muravskyi (2009–2010)

== League and cup history ==
Season	Div.	Pos.	Pl.	W	D	L	GS	GA	P	Domestic Cup	Europe	Notes
Before 2008	refer to Podillya Khmelnytskyi											
2008–09	3rd "A"	8	32	14	5	13	32	38	47	1/32 finals		
2009–10	3rd "A"	5	20	10	3	7	28	16	33	1/64 finals		
2010–11	3rd "A"	9	22	7	4	11	19	29	22	1/32 finals		−3
2011–12	3rd "A"	10	26	6	4	16	23	50	22	1/64 finals		
2012–13	3rd "A"	10	20	4	5	11	12	22	17	1/32 finals		
2012–13	3rd "3"	4	6	0	1	5	1	13	1	1/32 finals		Relegation groups
2013–14	3rd	19	36	3	2	31	18	52	11	1/32 finals		Withdrew

== See also ==
- FC Podillya Khmelnytskyi
- FC Krasyliv
