= Kingsman SC =

Canadian semi-professional soccer club

- Full name: Kingsman Soccer Club
- Founded: 2016
- Stadium: Esther Shiner Stadium, Toronto, Canada
- Head Coach: Oleg Kalyadin
- Coach: Viktor Raskov
- League: Canadian Soccer League
- 2019: CSL, 8th
- Website: http://www.kingsmansc.ca/

Kingsman SC was a Canadian soccer club based in King, Ontario that played in the unsanctioned Canadian Soccer League.

== History ==
The club was founded in 2016. They joined the Canadian Soccer League in 2019 with a team in the First Division as well as a team in the Reserve Division. They lost their inaugural match to FC Vorkuta 4–2. They finished their debut season in 8th place, clinching the final playoff spot.

== Players ==
=== First Division roster ===
As of May 20, 2019

Note: Flags indicate national team as defined under FIFA eligibility rules; some limited exceptions apply. Players may hold more than one non-FIFA nationality.

No.	Pos.	Nation	Player
18	DF	UKR	Andreii Kovalchuk
24	MF	CAN	Anfal Ekhlas
16	MF	CAN	Arthur Berlin
15	DF	UKR	Bogdan Bortnik
32	DF	UKR	Bohdan Sluka
26	MF	CAN	David Stratan
10	MF	UKR	Denis Diachenko
12	GK	UKR	Hryhoriy Krasovsky
14	DF	CAN	Dimitri Bannikov
13	MF	UKR	Dmytro Polyuhanych
5	FW	CAN	Edwin Vera
2	DF	UKR	Hlib Kiselov
19	MF	UKR	Igor Zaytsev
21	MF	UKR	Ihor Zhuk
23	DF	UKR	Ivan Yanchev

No.	Pos.	Nation	Player
25	DF	CAN	Kevin Mcgregor
42	MF	CAN	Nasser Haidery
11	MF	UKR	Oleh Savera
6	DF	UKR	Oleksandr Alieksieiev
1	GK	UKR	Oleksandr Lozinskyi
34	MF	UKR	Oleksii Fedoriuk
35	MF	UKR	Oleksii Muravskyi
36	MF	UKR	Ostap Tolochko
17	DF	UKR	Pavlo Shulhan
38	MF	UZB	Sanjar Kamalov
9	FW	UKR	Sayid Belmokhtar
4	DF	UKR	Serhii Pitel
39	DF	CAN	Simon Debess
8	MF	UKR	Stanislav Katana
29	DF	UKR	Vadym Zayarnyy
40	MF	UKR	Vasyl Zhuk
20	FW	UKR	Viktor Raskov
3	MF	KAZ	Vitaliy Kolomychenko
41	GK	UKR	Volodymyr Sydorenko

== Seasons ==
Men

Season	League	Teams	Record	Rank	Playoffs	Ref
2019	Canadian Soccer League	10	6–1–11	8th	Semi-finals	
