= Anatoliy Starushchenko =

Ukrainian footballer

Anatoly Starushchenko
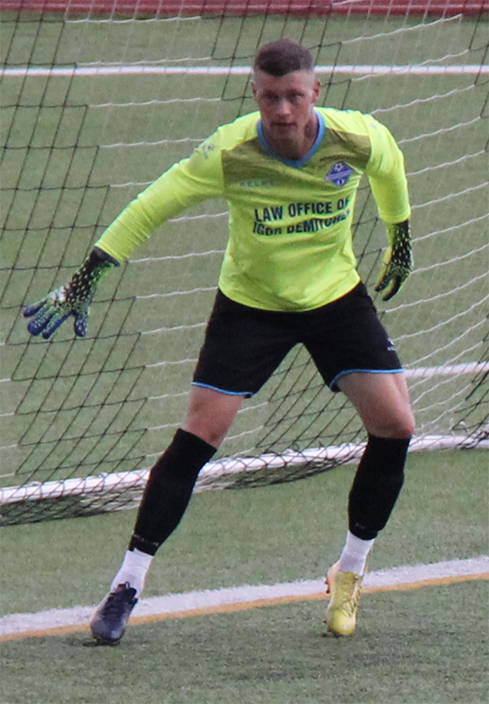
- Starushchenko in 2022

Personal information
- Full name: Anatoly Hennadyovych Starushchenko
- Date of birth: 14 January 1988 (age 38)
- Place of birth: Zhdanov, Ukrainian SSR, Soviet Union
- Height: 1.85 m (6 ft 1 in)
- Position: Goalkeeper

Team information
- Current team: Toronto Falcons

Senior career*
Years	Team	Apps	(Gls)
2005–2010	Illichivets Mariupol	0	(0)
2005–2010	FC Illichivets-2 Mariupol	60	(0)
2008–2009	FC Yednist' Plysky	6	(0)
2010–2011	FC Tytan Armyansk	1	(0)
2011–2013	CSKA Pamir Dushanbe	26	(0)
2013–2015	Khayr Vahdat FK	16	(0)
2015–2017	CSKA Pamir Dushanbe		
2017–2019	PFC Sumy	12	(0)
2018–2019	FC Podillya Khmelnytskyi	8	(0)
2019–2022	FC Vorkuta/Continentals		
2023–	Toronto Falcons		
- * Club domestic league appearances and goals as of 31 October 2019

Anatoly Starushchenko (born 14 January 1988) is a Ukrainian footballer playing with Toronto Falcons in the Canadian Soccer League.

== Playing career ==
=== Europe and Asia ===
Starushchenko started playing football in second grade. Starushchenko signed with Illichivets Mariupol in 2005 but featured in the Ukrainian Second League with FC Illichivets-2 Mariupol. He resumed playing in the third tier in 2008 with Yednist' Plysky. In 2010, he played in the Ukrainian First League with FC Tytan Armyansk where he appeared in one match.

The following season he played abroad in the Tajik League with CSKA Pamir Dushanbe after a failed trial with Dacia Chisinau in Moldova. After two seasons in Dushanbe, he was transferred to league rivals Khayr Vahdat where he spent two seasons. In 2015, he returned to his former club CSKA Pamir where he played for three seasons. After several seasons abroad in Asia he returned to the Ukrainian First League in 2017 in order to play with PFC Sumy. After a season with Sumy, he signed with FC Podillya Khmelnytskyi.

=== Canada ===
In 2019, he went abroad once more to play in the Canadian Soccer League with FC Vorkuta. In his debut season with Vorkuta, he assisted in securing the First Division title. He re-signed with Vorkuta for the 2020 season. He featured in the CSL Championship final against Scarborough SC and assisted in securing the championship. In his third season with Vorkuta, he assisted in securing Vorkuta's third regular-season title and secured the ProSound Cup against Scarborough. He also played in the 2021 playoffs where Vorkuta was defeated by Scarborough in the championship final.

In 2022, Vorkuta was renamed FC Continentals and Starushchenko was re-signed for his fourth season. Throughout the season, he helped Continentals secure a playoff berth by finishing fourth in the standings. He made his third consecutive championship final appearance against Scarborough once more where he won his second championship title.

After the hiatus of FC Continentals for the 2023 season, he joined league rivals Toronto Falcons.

== Honors ==
FC Vorkuta

- CSL Championship: 2020, 2022
- Canadian Soccer League First Division/Regular Season: 2019, 2021
- ProSound Cup: 2021
