= Illya Piltenko =

Ukrainian footballer

Illia Piltenko
Personal information
- Full name: Illia Valeryoych Piltenko
- Date of birth: 20 January 1993 (age 33)
- Place of birth: Ukraine
- Height: 1.78 m (5 ft 10 in)
- Position: Defender

Senior career*
Years	Team	Apps	(Gls)
2012–2013	Khimik Sievierodonetsk	26	(0)
2015	Helios-Akademiya Kharkiv	8	(1)
2015–2016	Veres Rivne	0	(0)
2016	Khimik Sievierodonetsk		
2016–2017	Kremin Kremenchuk	1	(0)
2016–2017	Enerhiya Nova Kakhovka	2	(0)
2017–2018	Nikopol	20	(0)
2017–2018	Krystal Chortkiv	7	(0)
2018	Peremoha Dnipro	7	(0)
2018–2019	Myr Hornostayivka	2	(0)
2018–2019	Peremoha Dnipro	8	(0)
2019–2022	Vorkuta/Continentals		
2019	→FC Vorkuta II		
2023	Dynamo Toronto		
- * Club domestic league appearances and goals

Illya Piltenko (Ukrainian: Ілля Валерійович Пільтенко; born January 20, 1993) is a Ukrainian former footballer who played as a defender.

Piltenko was a product of the Luhansk LVUFK system. After playing several seasons in his local regional league, he turned professional in 2016 by signing with Veres Rivne. He later played in the Ukrainian Second League with Kremin Kremenchuk, Enerhiya Nova Kakhovka, and Nikopol. Following his tenure in the professional circuit, he returned to the amateur leagues and made one more attempt at the professional level in 2018 with Myr Hornostayivka. In 2019, he ventured abroad to finish his career in Canada.

== Club career ==
=== Ukraine ===
Piltenko played in the Luhansk regional league from 2011 to 2015 with his local team Khimik Sieverodonetsk. In 2015, he signed with Helios Kharkiv, where he played for the team's reserve squad. He joined the professional ranks by signing a contract with Veres Rivne in 2016. After the conclusion of the season, he left the club.

Following his departure from Veres, he signed with Kremin Kremenchuk in the Ukrainian Second League. In his debut season in the country's third-tier league, he debuted in the 2016–17 Ukrainian Cup against Real Pharma Odesa. His time with Kremin was short-lived, as he joined with Enerhiya Nova Kakhovka for the remainder of the season. Piltenko signed for FC Nikopol for the 2017-18 season. He left Nikopol during the 2018 winter transfer market and played for Krystal Chortkiv in the national amateur league.

Piltenko returned to the regional circuit in the summer of 2018 to sign with Peremoha Dnipro. Shortly after signing with Peremoha, he returned to the professional circuit to play with Myr Hornostayivka. After two appearances with Myr, he returned to Peremoha Dnipro to compete in the national amateur league. After the conclusion of the season, he left Dnipro.

=== Canada ===
In the summer of 2019, he signed with FC Vorkuta in the Canadian Soccer League. He primarily played with the club's reserve team in the league's season division. He helped the club secure the divisional title. In the playoffs, Vorkuta defeated the Serbian White Eagles' reserve team for the championship.

The following season, Piltenko played for Vorkuta's senior team in the league's first division. He helped Vorkuta secure a playoff berth by finishing as runners-up in the division. In the playoffs, Vorkuta defeated Scarborough SC for the championship title. In 2021, he returned to Vorkuta for his third season. Throughout the 2021 season, he helped the club win the regular season title and the ProSound Cup. He also played in the 2021 playoff finals, where Scarborough defeated Vorkuta. In 2022, the club was renamed FC Continentals, and he was signed for the season. The team would qualify for the playoffs, where they defeated Scarborough for the championship.

After the hiatus of FC Continentals for the 2023 season, he joined league rivals Dynamo Toronto.

== Honors ==
FC Vorkuta

- CSL Championship: 2020, 2022
- Canadian Soccer League Regular Season: 2021
- ProSound Cup: 2021
- CSL Championship runner-up: 2021

FC Vorkuta II

- CSL II Championship: 2019
- Canadian Soccer League Second Division: 2019
