= Camaal Reid =

Jamaican footballer (born 1988)

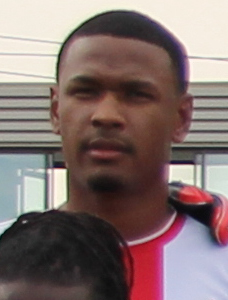
- Reid in 2022

Personal information
- Full name: Camaal Anthony Reid
- Date of birth: 17 May 1988 (age 38)
- Place of birth: May Pen, Jamaica
- Position: Midfielder

Team information
- Current team: Scarborough SC

Senior career*
Years	Team	Apps	(Gls)
2009–2016	Sporting Central Academy	100	(1)
2016–2017	York Region Shooters	26	(6)
2018	North Mississauga SC	2	(0)
2019	ProStars FC	4	(0)
2021–	Scarborough SC	1	(2)

International career
2012	Jamaica	1	(0)
- * Club domestic league appearances and goals as of 2021-8-30

Camaal Reid (born 17 May 1988) is a Jamaican footballer playing with Scarborough SC in the Canadian Soccer League.

== Club career ==
=== Jamaica ===
Reid began playing in the National Premier League in 2009 with Sporting Central Academy. He re-signed with Sporting for the 2010–11 season and helped the team avoid relegation. In 2011, he returned for his third season with Sporting and played in a friendly match against the Jamaica national team, where Central Academy defeated the national team. He re-signed with Sporting for the 2014-15 season and marked his final season in the National Premier League as the club was relegated. He remained with Sporting for the following season and played in the South Central Confederation Super League.

=== Canada ===
In 2016, he played abroad in the Canadian Soccer League with the York Region Shooters. In his debut season with York Region, he assisted the club in producing an 11-game unbeaten streak. He would also assist the club in securing the First Division title and clinching a playoff berth. York Region would be eliminated in the second round of the playoffs by Hamilton City in a penalty shootout. He re-signed with York Region for the 2017 season. Reid assisted the club in winning the CSL Championship after defeating Scarborough SC in a penalty shootout.

In 2018, he played with North Mississauga SC. He played with league rivals ProStars FC for the 2019 season.

In 2021, he returned to the Canadian Soccer League to play with Scarborough SC. In his debut match for Scarborough, he recorded two goals against Toronto Tigers. He helped Scarborough qualify for the ProSound Cup tournament, where he recorded a goal against Atletico Sporting Toronto, which advanced the club to the finals. In the finals, Scarborough faced FC Vorkuta but was defeated in a penalty shootout. He also assisted the club in securing the CSL Championship, where Scarborough defeated Vorkuta, which marked his second championship title.

Reid re-signed with Scarborough for the 2022 season. Throughout the 2022 campaign, the eastern Toronto side would achieve an 18-game undefeated streak and playoff position by finishing third. Reid made his third championship appearance, which Scarborough lost to FC Continentals (formerly FC Vorkuta).

He had another season with Scarborough in 2023. Scarborough would clinch the regular-season title throughout the year. Reid returned for the 2024 season. Throughout the 2024 season, the club finished as runners-up to the Serbian White Eagles. In 2025, he helped the club secure a league double.

== International career ==
Reid played in a friendly match against Jamaica's national football team, where he impressed the national team head coach, Theodore Whitmore. After impressing the national team head coach, he was called to the national team training camp in preparation for the 2014 FIFA World Cup qualification. He debuted for the Jamaican national team on 24 February 2012 against Cuba in a friendly match.

== Honors ==
York Region Shooters

- CSL Championship: 2017
- Canadian Soccer League First Division: 2016

Scarborough SC

- CSL Championship: 2021, 2025
- Canadian Soccer League Regular Season: 2023, 2025
- Canadian Soccer League Regular Season runner-up: 2024
