= Lyubomyr Halchuk =

Ukrainian footballer (born 1981)

Personal information
- Full name: Lyubomyr Bohdanovych Halchuk
- Date of birth: 18 September 1981 (age 45)
- Place of birth: Nadvirna, Ivano-Frankivsk Oblast, Ukrainian SSR
- Height: 1.83 m (6 ft 0 in)
- Position: Defender

Senior career*
Years	Team	Apps	(Gls)
2001–2004	Volyn Lutsk	12	(0)
2001–2003	Kovel-Volyn-2 Kovel	15	(0)
2004	Ikva Mlyniv	1	(0)
2004	Polissya Zhytomyr	14	(0)
2005–2006	Hazovyk-Skala Stryi	31	(0)
2006–2011	Lviv	111	(7)
2010–2013	Helios Kharkiv	42	(2)
2013–2014	Tytan Armyansk	17	(0)
2014	Lapaivka	18	(3)
2015	Mykolaiv		
2015–2016	Veres Rivne	15	(3)
2016	Ukraine United		
2017–2021	Vorkuta		
- * Club domestic league appearances and goals

Lyubomyr Bohdanovych Halchuk (Ukrainian: Любомир Богданович Гальчук; born 18 September 1981) is a Ukrainian former footballer who played as a defender.

== Career ==
=== Ukraine ===
Halchuk began playing at the local youth level and ultimately signed with Volyn Lutsk in the Ukrainian First League in 2001. In his debut season with Volyn, he helped the club secure promotion to the Ukrainian Premier League by winning the league title. During his tenure in Volyn, the majority of his time was with the junior team Kovel-Volyn Kovel. Halchuk also had a loan spell with Polissya Zhytomyr. Throughout his four-year stint with Volyn, he made several appearances in the Ukrainian top tier.

In 2005, he returned to the Ukrainian second tier to sign with Hazovyk-Skala Stryi. After a season with Hazovyk, he signed with league rivals Lviv the following year. Halchuk returned to the country's premier league when he assisted Lviv in securing promotion following the conclusion of the 2007–08 season. He made 16 appearances with Lviv during his second stint in the top tier. In one notable match on 16 August 2008, against rivals Vorskla Poltava, UA-Football named him one of the two best central defenders of the fifth round in the Ukrainian Premier League. Unfortunately, the club's run in the premier league was short-lived as they were relegated to the First League.

After five seasons with Lviv, he remained in the second tier by signing with Helios Kharkiv. He re-signed with Helios for the 2011–12 season. In 2013, he signed with league rivals Tytan Armyansk. After appearing in 17 matches, he left Tytan after the season's conclusion. Following his departure from Tytan, he spent some time at the amateur level. He returned to the professional level in 2015 by signing with Veres Rivne in the Ukrainian Second League. He departed from Veres after the season to pursue a career in Canada.

=== Canada ===
In 2016, he went abroad to sign with FC Ukraine United of the Canadian Soccer League. In his debut season in Canada, he assisted the club in securing a postseason berth by finishing second in the league's first division. He also served as vice-captain and helped the club reach the second round of the playoffs. In the first round of the playoffs, Ukraine United defeated the Brantford Galaxy. The club's playoff run ended in the next round after a defeat by the Serbian White Eagles.

The following season, he played with league rivals Vorkuta and won the divisional title with the club. In his second season with Vorkuta, he assisted in securing the CSL Championship, where he recorded a goal against Scarborough SC. In 2020, he assisted in securing Vorkuta's second CSL Championship after defeating Scarborough SC. In 2021, he assisted in securing Vorkuta's third regular-season title and secured the ProSound Cup against Scarborough. He also played in the 2021 playoffs, where Vorkuta was defeated by Scarborough in the championship final.

== Honors ==
Volyn-1 Lutsk

- Ukrainian First League: 2001–02

FC Vorkuta

- CSL Championship: 2018, 2020
- Canadian Soccer League First Division/Regular Season: 2017, 2019, 2021
- ProSound Cup: 2021
