= Serhiy Ivlyev =

Ukrainian footballer

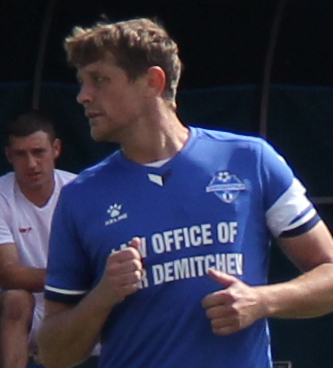
- Ivlyev in 2022

Personal information
- Full name: Serhiy Mykhailovych Ivlyev
- Date of birth: December 4, 1984 (age 41)
- Place of birth: Novoukrainka, Ukrainian SSR, Soviet Union
- Height: 6 ft 1 in (1.85 m)
- Position: Forward

Senior career*
Years	Team	Apps	(Gls)
2003–2006	Hazovyk-KhGV Kharkiv	45	(16)
2005–2006	Dnipro Cherkasy	10	(2)
2006–2007	Borysfen Boryspi	13	(1)
2006–2007	Hazovyk-KhGV Kharkiv	4	(0)
2007–2008	Arsenal Kharkiv	32	(15)
2008–2010	Arsenal-Kyivshchyna Bila Tserkva	32	(6)
2009–2010	Poltava	11	(3)
2009–2010	Hetman Żółkiewka		
2010–2011	Partyzant Targowiska	15	(4)
2011	UkrAhroKom Holovkivka	7	(3)
2011–2012	Tytan Armyansk	13	(0)
2011–2014	Kremin Kremenchuk	55	(9)
2013–2014	Shakhtar Sverdlovsk	6	(0)
2014–2015	Hetman Żółkiewka	14	(7)
2015–2016	Tomasovia Tomaszów Lubelski	17	(2)
2016	Ukraine United	21	(15)
2017–2022	Vorkuta/Continentals	31	(24)
2019	→ Vorkuta (loan)	6	(3)
2023	Dynamo Toronto		
- * Club domestic league appearances and goals as of September 30, 2018

Serhiy Mykhailovych Ivlyev (Ukrainian: Сергій Михайлович Івлєв, romanized: Serhii Mykhailovych Ivliev; born December 4, 1984) is a Ukrainian footballer.

== Career ==
=== Europe ===
Ivliev began his career in 2003 with Hazovyk-KhGV Kharkiv in the Ukrainian Second League where he spent three seasons. In 2005, he was loaned to Dnipro Cherkasy and assisted in winning the league title and securing promotion to the Ukrainian First League. He would play in the second trier but with Borysfen Boryspi, but returned to his original club midway through the season as Borysfen went bankrupt. After the season he signed with Arsenal Kharkiv in 2007 and remained in the third tier with Arsenal-Kyivshchyna Bila Tserkva the following season.

He would in his debut season with Bila Tserkva help the club secure a promotion by finishing second in the standings. In 2009, he signed a contract with FC Poltava. After a season in Poltava, he played abroad in Poland to sign with IV liga side Hetman Żółkiewka, before moving to III liga club Partyzant Targowiska. In 2011, he returned to Ukraine to play with UkrAhroKom Holovkivka, and received another stint in the first league with Tytan Armyansk. After a brief stint in the first league, he returned to the second league to play with Kremin Kremenchuk.

He was shortly after loaned to league rivals Shakhtar Sverdlovsk in 2103. He went once more across the border to Poland in 2014 to play for Hetman Żółkiewka and Tomasovia Tomaszów Lubelski.

=== Ukraine United ===
In 2016, he went to Canada to sign with Ukraine United in the Canadian Soccer League. He recorded his first goal for the organization on June 12, 2016, in a 3–2 victory over Hamilton City. In his debut season, he assisted the club in securing a postseason berth for the club by finishing second in the standings. In the first round of the playoffs, he contributed a goal in a 3–0 victory over Brantford Galaxy. Following their victory, they were eliminated from the playoffs after a 1–0 loss to the Serbian White Eagles. He was awarded the CSL Golden Boot for finishing as the league's top goalscorer with 15 goals.

=== Vorkuta ===
After the relegation of FC Ukraine to the Second Division, he signed with FC Vorkuta. Throughout the season he finished as the club's top goalscorer with 13 goals and secured the regular-season title. In his second season with Vorkuta he assisted in securing the CSL Championship, and for the second consecutive year finished as the club's top goalscorer. In 2020, he assisted in securing Vorkuta's second championship title after defeating Scarborough SC.

In 2021, he assisted in securing Vorkuta's third regular-season title and secured the ProSound Cup against Scarborough. He also played in the 2021 playoffs where Vorkuta was defeated by Scarborough in the championship final. In 2022, Vorkuta was renamed FC Continentals and he re-signed with the club for the season where he served as the team captain. In his sixth season with the club, he helped Continentals secure a postseason berth by finishing fourth in the standings. He helped the club secure their third championship title after defeating Scarborough in the finals.

=== Dynamo Toronto ===
Following the Continentals' hiatus in 2023, he signed with the league expansion franchise Dynamo Toronto. Ivlyev would finish the 2023 campaign as the league's top goal scorer with 13 goals for the second time in his career.

== Honors ==
Dnipro Cherkasy

- Ukrainian Second League Group C: 2005–06

Vorkuta

- CSL Championship: 2018, 2020, 2022
- Canadian Soccer League First Division/Regular Season: 2017, 2019, 2021
- ProSound Cup: 2021

Individual

- CSL Golden Boot: 2016, 2023
