= Borys Orlovskyi =

Ukrainian footballer

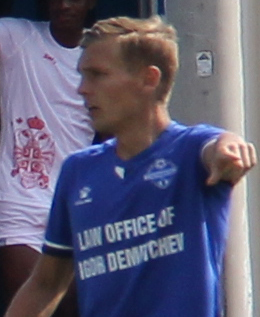
- Orlovskyi in 2022

Personal information
- Full name: Borys Pavlovych Orlovskyi
- Date of birth: 16 January 1993 (age 33)
- Place of birth: Chernivtsi, Ukraine
- Height: 1.83 m (6 ft 0 in)
- Position: Defensive midfielder

Youth career
- 2006–2007: Osvita Chernivtsi
- 2007–2008: Dynamo Kyiv
- 2008–2010: RVUFK Kyiv

Senior career*
Years	Team	Apps	(Gls)
2010–2014	Bukovyna Chernivtsi	51	(0)
2012	→ Tavriya Simferopol (loan)	0	(0)
2014–2015	Gandzasar Kapan	10	(1)
2015	Bukovyna Chernivtsi	5	(1)
2015–2017	Veres Rivne	44	(4)
2017	Lviv	8	(0)
2018	Trepça	3	(0)
2018–2019	Veres Rivne	20	(5)
2019–2022	Bukovyna Chernivtsi	41	(3)
2022	FC Continentals		

International career^{‡}
2010–2012	Ukraine U19	18	(2)
- * Club domestic league appearances and goals as of 24 August 2022 ‡ National team caps and goals as of 24 August 2022

Borys Pavlovych Orlovskyi (Ukrainian: Борис Павлович Орловський; born 16 January 1993) is a Ukrainian professional footballer who plays as a defensive midfielder.

== Club career ==
=== Europe ===
Orlovskyi began his career in his home region in 2010 with Bukovyna Chernivtsi in the Ukrainian First League. After several seasons with Bukovyna, he was loaned to Tavriya Simferopol in the country's top tier the Ukrainian Premier League in 2012. His stint in the Crimea was short-lived as he failed to make an appearance for the club, resulting in him returning to Bukovyna. In 2014, he played abroad in the Caucasus region with FC Gandzasar Kapan in the Armenian Premier League. In his single season in Armenia, he played in 10 matches and recorded one goal. His lone goal was against FC Mika on September 27, 2014.

For the remainder of the 2015 season, he returned to his former club Bukovyna. Following his brief stint in Bukovyna, he played in the country's third tier the Ukrainian Second League with Veres Rivne. He helped the team secure promotion to the second tier and re-signed with the club in 2016. He departed from Veres after the conclusion of the 2016-17 season. Following his release from Veres, he signed with FC Lviv. His tenure with Lviv was brief as he mutually parted ways with the club in early 2018.

Orlovskyi returned to the third tier with former club Veres Rivne where he served as the team captain. After a season with Veres, he departed from the club. In 2019, he returned to his home club Bukovyna for his third and final stint. He played his final season with Bukovyna in 2021. On 1 May 2021, he missed a penalty against FC Chernihiv saved by Oleksandr Shyray at the Chernihiv Arena in the 2020–21 season.

=== Canada ===
In 2022, he played abroad once more this time in the Canadian Soccer League with FC Continentals. Throughout the season he helped the club secure a postseason berth by finishing fourth in the standings. He featured in the CSL Championship final where the Continentals defeated Scarborough SC for the title.

== International career ==
Orlovskyi was a member of the Ukraine national under-18 football team participated at Vladislav Granatkin's Cup in Russia in January 2011.

== Honors ==
FC Continentals

- CSL Championship: 2022
