= Viktor Raskov =

Ukrainian footballer

Personal information
- Full name: Viktor Viktororovych Raskov
- Date of birth: 8 May 1984 (age 42)
- Place of birth: Odesa, Ukrainian SSR, Soviet Union
- Height: 1.83 m (6 ft 0 in)
- Position: Forward

Senior career*
Years	Team	Apps	(Gls)
2002–2004	Chornomorets-2 Odesa	52	(6)
2004–2005	Dniester Ovdiopol	21	(0)
2005–2006	Arsenal Kharkiv	23	(11)
2006–2007	Stal Kamianske	1	(0)
2008–2009	Šiauliai	56	(13)
2009	Kruoja Pakruojis	8	(0)
2009–2010	Pogoń Siedlce	12	(2)
2010–2011	Šiauliai	34	(10)
2011–2014	Helios Kharkiv	68	(20)
2014	Avanhard Kramatorsk	11	(0)
2014	Andijon	4	(0)
2014–2015	Real Pharma Odesa	25	(1)
2017–2018	FC Vorkuta B	5	(1)
2019	Kingsman SC	15	(4)
2020–2021	FC Vorkuta		

Managerial career
- 2022: FC Continentals
- * Club domestic league appearances and goals

Viktor Raskov (born 8 May 1984) is a Ukrainian former footballer who played as a forward. He was most recently the head coach for FC Continentals in the Canadian Soccer League.

== Career ==
=== Europe ===
Raskov began his career in 2002 in the Ukrainian Second League with Chornomorets-2 Odesa and later signed with Dniester Ovdiopol. In 2005, he played in the Ukrainian First League with Arsenal Kharkiv, and with Stal Kamianske in 2006. The following season, he went abroad to play in the A Lyga with Šiauliai. The remainder of his first tenure in Lithuania was spent with Kruoja Pakruojis. In 2010, he played in the III liga with Pogoń Siedlce. After one season in Poland, he returned to Šiauliai, where he finished as the club's top goalscorer with eight goals. He featured in the 2010–11 UEFA Europa League against Wisła Kraków. He also played in the 2010–11 Baltic League.

=== Ukraine and Asia ===
He returned to Ukraine in 2011 to sign with Helios Kharkiv. After several seasons with Helios, he signed with league rivals Avanhard Kramatorsk. He played abroad once again, this time in the Uzbek League with FC Andijon throughout the 2014 season. Following a brief stint in Central Asia, he returned to the Second League for the remainder of the season to play with Real Pharma Odesa.

=== Canada ===
In 2017, he played overseas in the Canadian Soccer League with FC Vorkuta. For the 2019 season, he was transferred to the expansion franchise Kingsman SC. In 2020, he returned to Vorkuta and assisted in securing Vorkuta's second CSL Championship after defeating Scarborough SC.

== Managerial career ==
Raskov was selected as an assistant coach under head coach Andrei Malychenkov for FC Vorkuta for the 2021 CSL season. He assisted Vorkuta in clinching the regular-season title and the ProSound Cup in 2021. He also helped Vorkuta to the CSL Championship final but was defeated by Scarborough.

In 2022, Vorkuta was rebranded as FC Continentals and was subsequently named the head coach. He shortly after reverted to his former position as an assistant coach to Malychenkov. Raskov, under Malychenkov's tenure, would help guide the club to its third championship after defeating Scarborough.

== Honours ==
FC Vorkuta

- Canadian Soccer League First Division: 2017
- CSL Championship: 2020
