= Andriy Sorokin =

Ukrainian footballer

Personal information
- Date of birth: 1 January 1991 (age 35)
- Place of birth: Ukrainian SSR
- Position: Midfielder

Youth career
- 2004–2008: LVUFK Luhansk

Senior career*
Years	Team	Apps	(Gls)
2015–2016	Inhulets-3 Petrove		
2017	Inhulets-2 Petrove	8	(0)
2017–2018	Myr Hornostayivka	25	(0)
2018	VPK-Ahro Shevchenkivka	13	(0)
2019	Myr Hornostayivka	10	(0)
2019	Slavia Mozyr	2	(0)
2020	Hirnyk-Sport Horishni Plavni	5	(1)
2020	Avanhard Kramatorsk	11	(0)
2021	Krystal Kherson	13	(1)
2022	FC Continentals		
2023	Dynamo Toronto		
- * Club domestic league appearances and goals as of 16 June 2021

Andriy Sorokin (Ukrainian: Андрій Сорокін; born 1 January 1991) is a Ukrainian professional footballer who plays as a midfielder.

== Club career ==
=== Early career ===
Sorokin played with the reserve teams of FC Inhulets Petrove originally in the Ukrainian Amateur Football Championship and ultimately joined the professional ranks in the Ukrainian Second League in 2017. For the 2017-18 season, he continued playing in the country's third tier with Myr Hornostayivka. Following his stint in the professional realm, he returned to the amateur level to play with VPK-Ahro Shevchenkivka where he won the Dnipropetrovsk regional title. After a year's absence, he returned to Myr Hornostayivka in 2019.

=== Belarus ===
In the summer of 2019, he played abroad in the Belarusian Premier League with Slavia Mozyr. In his debut season in Belarus, he made two appearances. His stint with Slavia was brief and was released after his two appearances.

=== Ukraine ===
He returned to Ukraine to play in the Ukrainian First League with Hirnyk-Sport Horishni Plavni. In total, he played in 5 matches and recorded one goal. He left Hirnyk after a single season. The following season he resumed playing in the second tier with Avanhard Kramatorsk. Sorokin left Kramatorsk midway through the 2020-21 season in order to complete the season with Krystal Kherson.

=== Canada ===
In 2022, he signed a two-year contract with FC Continentals in the Canadian Soccer League. Throughout the season he helped the club secure a postseason berth by finishing fourth in the standings. He featured in the CSL Championship final where the Continentals defeated Scarborough SC for the title.

Following Continentals hiatus in 2023, he signed with the expansion franchise Dynamo Toronto.

== Honors ==
FC Continentals

- CSL Championship: 2022
