= Pavlo Chornomaz =

Ukrainian footballer

Personal information
- Full name: Pavlo Olehovych Chornomaz
- Date of birth: 8 July 1990 (age 36)
- Place of birth: Dubno, Ukrainian SSR, Soviet Union
- Height: 1.81 m (5 ft 11 1/2 in)
- Position: Midfielder

Youth career
- 2005–2006: FC Veres Rivne
- 2006–2007: FC Volyn Lutsk

Senior career*
Years	Team	Apps	(Gls)
2007–2009	Volyn Lutsk	18	(0)
2009–2011	Zirka Kirovohrad	65	(5)
2012	Arsenal Bila Tserkva	20	(2)
2014	Volyn Lutsk	0	(0)
2014	Zhemchuzhina Yalta		
2014–2015	FC Shakhtar Yalta		
2015	FC Yalta		
2016–2017	Ternopil	6	(0)
2017	Dnister Zalishchyky	6	(1)
2017–2018	Krystal Chortkiv	12	(1)
2019–2022	FC Vorkuta		
2023	Dynamo Toronto FC		
- * Club domestic league appearances and goals

Pavlo Olehovych Chornomaz (Ukrainian: Павло Олегович Чорномаз; born 8 July 1990) is a professional Ukrainian football midfielder.

== Career ==
=== Early career ===
Chornomaz began his playing career in sports schools in Rivne and then in Lutsk. He joined the first team, Volyn Lutsk, in the Ukrainian First League in 2008. He made his first-team debut as a second-half substitute against Prykarpattya Ivano-Frankivsk on 4 May 2008. In 2009, he continued playing in the Ukrainian First League with Zirka Kirovohrad. During his tenure with Kirovohrad, he debuted in the Ukrainian Cup against Lviv. He departed from Zirka in the winter of 2011.

After three seasons in Kirovohrad, he signed with league rivals Arsenal Bila Tserkva in 2012. He received a chance to play in the Ukrainian Premier League by returning to his former club, Volyn Lutsk, in 2014. During his second stint in Volyn, he failed to make a single appearance.

=== Crimea ===
In 2014, he played in the Russian Professional Football League with Zhemchuzhina Yalta. When Russia annexed Crimea, he remained in the peninsula and played in the local circuit with Shakhtar Yalta. In the summer of 2015, he played in the All-Crimean Tournament with FC Yalta to determine the inaugural Crimean champion.

=== Ukraine ===
In 2016, he returned to the Ukrainian second-tier league and signed with Ternopil. After the relegation of Ternopil, he played in the Ukrainian Amateur Football League with Dnister Zalishchyky in 2017. For the 2018 season, he played with FSK Crystal Chortkiv.

=== Canada ===
In 2019, he played abroad in the Canadian Soccer League with FC Vorkuta. In his debut season with Vorkuta, he assisted in securing the league's first division title. The following season, he featured in the CSL Championship final against Scarborough SC and scored a goal to secure the championship.

In the 2021 season, he assisted in securing Vorkuta's third regular-season title. In the opening round of the ProSound Cup tournament, he contributed a goal against the Serbian White Eagles, which advanced Vorkuta to the finals. He helped Vorkuta win the ProSound Cup against Scarborough in a penalty shootout. After four seasons with Vorkuta, he departed from the club and signed with the expansion side Dynamo Toronto FC for the 2023 season.

== Honors ==
FC Vorkuta

- CSL Championship: 2020
- Canadian Soccer League First Division/Regular Season: 2019, 2021
- ProSound Cup: 2021
