= Bohdan Borovskyi =

Ukrainian footballer

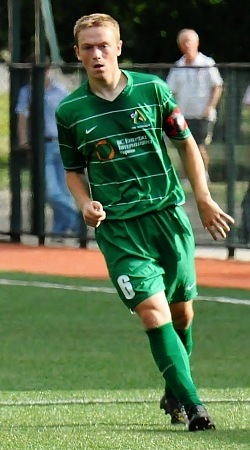
- Borovskyi in 2011

Personal information
- Full name: Bohdan Stanislavovych Borovskyi
- Date of birth: 17 September 1992 (age 34)
- Place of birth: Oleksandriya, Ukraine
- Height: 1.78 m (5 ft 10 in)
- Position: Midfielder

Team information
- Current team: Toronto Falcons

Youth career
- 2005–2009: FC Ametyst Oleksandria

Senior career*
Years	Team	Apps	(Gls)
2009–2010	FC Ametyst Oleksandria	25	(4)
2010–2012	Oleksandriya	1	(0)
2012	Zhemchuzhyna Yalta	16	(0)
2013–2014	UkrAhroKom Holovkivka	39	(4)
2014–2016	Hirnyk Kryvyi Rih	57	(5)
2016–2017	Oleksandriya	0	(0)
2017	→ Inhulets Petrove (loan)	10	(0)
2017–2018	Kremin Kremenchuk	22	(1)
2018–2019	Hirnyk-Sport Horishni Plavni	22	(2)
2019–2022	FC Vorkuta/Continentals		
2023–	Toronto Falcons		
- * Club domestic league appearances and goals as of 16 November 2019

Bohdan Borovskyi (Ukrainian: Богдан Станіславович Боровський; born 17 September 1992) is a Ukrainian football midfielder playing with Toronto Falcons in the Canadian Soccer League.

== Career ==
=== Ukraine ===
He was a product of FC Ametyst Oleksandria sportive school. After graduating from the academy level, he played in the Ukrainian First League in 2010 with Oleksandriya. In his debut season, he assisted the club in securing promotion to the Ukrainian Premier League by winning the league title. In 2012, he played in the Ukrainian Second League with Zhemchuzhina Yalta. The following season, he played in the second tier with UkrAhroKom Holovkivka. During his time with Holovkivka, he debuted in the Ukrainian Cup against Naftovyk-Ukrnafta Okhtyrka.

In 2014, he signed with league rivals Hirnyk Kryvyi Rih, where he played for two seasons. He returned to his former club, Oleksandriya, in 2016 and had a loan spell with Inhulets Petrove. After failing to break into the first team, he signed with Kremin Kremenchuk in 2017. He remained in the second tier by signing with Hirnyk-Sport Horishni Plavni in 2018, where he played for two seasons. In 2019, he was released from his contract with Hirnyk.

=== Canada ===
In 2019, he played abroad in the Canadian Soccer League with FC Vorkuta. In his debut season with Vorkuta, he assisted the club in securing the league's first division title. The following season, he played in the championship final against Scarborough SC and secured the title by recording a goal.

In 2021, he assisted in securing Vorkuta's third regular-season title and the ProSound Cup against Scarborough. He also played in the 2021 playoffs, where Vorkuta was defeated by Scarborough in the championship final. In 2022, Vorkuta was renamed FC Continentals and re-signed with the club for the season. Throughout the 2022 season, he helped the Continentals to secure a playoff berth by finishing fourth in the standings. In the second round of the playoffs, he contributed a goal against the Serbian White Eagles, which advanced the team to the championship final. He made his third consecutive championship final appearance against Scarborough once more, where he won his second championship title.

After the hiatus of FC Continentals for the 2023 season, he joined league rivals Toronto Falcons. Borovskyi would help the Falcons finish third in the standings.

== Personal life ==
His father, Stanislav, was also a footballer.

== Honors ==
FC Oleksandriya

- Ukrainian First League: 2010–11

FC Vorkuta

- CSL Championship: 2020, 2022
- Canadian Soccer League First Division/Regular Season: 2019, 2021
- ProSound Cup: 2021
