= Denys Yanchuk =

Ukrainian footballer and manager

Personal information
- Full name: Denys Mykolayovych Yanchuk
- Date of birth: 14 August 1988 (age 38)
- Place of birth: Khmelnytskyi, Ukraine SSR, Soviet Union
- Position: Midfielder

Senior career*
| Years | Team | Apps | (Gls) |
| 2006 | Iskra-Skirts | 6 | (0) |
| 2006–2008 | FC Podillya Khmelnytskyi | 24 | (0) |
| 2009–2016 | FC Ukraine United | | |
| 2017 | FC Vorkuta B | 4 | (1) |

Managerial career
- 2020: FC Vorkuta
- * Club domestic league appearances and goals

Denys Yanchuk (Ukrainian: Денис Миколайович Янчук; born 14 August 1988) is a former Ukrainian footballer who played as a midfielder and was also a football manager.

== Club career ==
=== Ukraine ===
Yanchuk played at the local regional level with Iskra-Podillia in 2006. For the remainder of the 2006 season, he played with Podillya Khmelnytskyi, which merged with Krasyliv-Obolon to compete in the Ukrainian First League. He debuted for the club on July 21, 2006, against CSKA Kyiv. In total, he played in 19 matches for Podillya. He returned to play with Podillya the following season to play in the Ukrainian Football Amateur League. In 2007, the club secured promotion to the Ukrainian Second League, where he appeared in 4 matches.

=== Canada ===
In 2008, he played abroad in the Ontario Soccer League with FC Ukraine United. During his tenure with Ukraine United, he won the OSL Central Regional Division title, the George Finnie Cup, and the Great Lakes Cup. In 2016, he played an instrumental role along with Vladimir Koval, and Andrei Malychenkov in bringing Ukraine United into the Canadian Soccer League. In his debut season in the CSL, he served as club president while remaining an active player.

He continued playing in the Canadian Soccer League in 2017 with Vorkuta in the league's second division. He returned to play with Vorkuta's reserve team in 2019, where he contributed a goal to secure the championship title against the Serbian White Eagles.

== Managerial career ==
He began to transition into the administrative side of soccer and became involved with the ownership of Vorkuta, which included persuading the organization to join the professional ranks. As a result, Vorkuta secured a franchise in the Canadian Soccer League in 2017. He served as the general manager and assistant coach for Samad Kadirov in 2018. Yanchuk would primarily recruit players from the Ukrainian football market, which allowed Vorkuta to develop into an elite team in the CSL. Throughout the 2018 season, the club won its first CSL Championship against Scarborough SC. The club found additional success in the league's second division, where their reserve team secured the double.

He continued in his role as general manager with Vorkuta for the 2019 season. The club found further success in 2019 when they clinched the First Division title and the reserve squad once more defended their double. In 2020, he was assigned head coach responsibilities for Vorkuta. He managed to lead Vorkuta to their second title after defeating Scarborough. In 2021, he became an agent for UEFA. For the 2022 season, Vorkuta was renamed FC Continentals where he once again returned to his role as general manager. The club managed to secure their third championship title after defeating Scarborough once more in the finals.

== Honours ==
=== Player ===
FC Vorkuta II

- CSL II Championship: 2017

=== Manager ===
FC Vorkuta

- CSL Championship: 2020
