= Mirko Medić =

Serbian footballer & manager (born 1980)

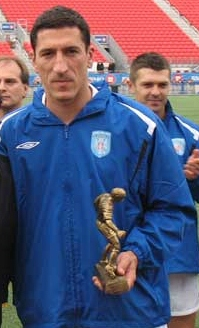
- Medić being named Defender of the Year in 2009

Personal information
- Full name: Mirko Medić
- Date of birth: November 23, 1980 (age 45)
- Place of birth: Valjevo, SR Serbia, SFR Yugoslavia
- Height: 6 ft 1 in (1.85 m)
- Position: Defender

Youth career
- Budućnost Valjevo

Senior career*
Years	Team	Apps	(Gls)
1998–2001	Železničar Lajkovac		
2001–2002	Mladost Lučani	6	(0)
2006–2012	Serbian White Eagles		
2013	Brampton City United		
2014–2015	Serbian White Eagles		
2017–2018	Serbia AC (indoor)		
2019–2020	Serbian White Eagles		

Managerial career
- 2011–2012: Serbian White Eagles (player-coach)
- 2016: Serbian White Eagles
- 2021–2023: Scarborough SC
- * Club domestic league appearances and goals

Mirko Medić (Serbian Cyrillic: Мирко Медић; born November 23, 1980) is a Serbian former footballer who played as a defender. Most recently, he was head coach for Scarborough SC in the Canadian Soccer League.

== Club career ==
=== Serbia ===
Medić began his career in the Second League of FR Yugoslavia with FK Železničar Lajkovac. In 2001, he played in the First League of FR Yugoslavia with FK Mladost Lučani.

=== Canada ===
In 2006, he ventured abroad to play in the interprovincial Canadian Soccer League with the reactivated Serbian White Eagles FC. Medić was selected to the league all-star roster against Clyde FC in his debut season. He aided the expansion side in securing a postseason berth by clinching the International Division title. He also played in the CSL Championship final against the Italia Shooters, which the Serbs lost. Medić re-signed with the White Eagles the following season and was named to the all-star team for the second consecutive time. The Serbs also managed to successfully defend their divisional title. The club would ultimately reach the championship final, where the western Toronto side was defeated by Toronto Croatia in a two-game series.

The 2008 season marked his third year with the organization, and he once again aided the club in securing a playoff berth by finishing second in the division. For the third consecutive season, the Serbs reached the championship final where they successfully defeated Trois-Rivières Attak in a penalty shootout. In 2009, he was honored by the league with Defender of the Year honors. The club produced another successful season where they clinched their fourth divisional title. Medić made his fourth consecutive championship final appearance, where the Serbs lost their championship to Trois-Rivières in penalties.

He re-signed with the White Eagles for the 2010 season. During the 2010 season, he was part of the Toronto FC side that played an international friendly against Bolton Wanderers at BMO Field on July 21, 2010. Medić re-signed with Serbia for his sixth season in 2011. He assisted the club in securing a postseason by finishing fifth in the First Division.

After seven seasons with the White Eagles, he departed from the organization in 2013 to play with league rivals Brampton City United. In his debut season with Brampton, the club was eliminated in the opening round of the playoffs by SC Waterloo Region. Following a brief stint in Brampton, he returned to the White Eagles in 2014. In his final season with the Serbs, he helped the club clinch the top-division title in 2015. He contributed a goal in the semifinal match of the postseason where Waterloo eliminated the Serbs from the competition.

In the winter of 2017, he played indoor soccer in the Arena Premier League with Serbia AC.

== Managerial career ==
After his retirement, he was appointed head coach along with Uroš Stamatović for Serbia in 2016. In his first season as manager, he led the team to their second championship by defeating Hamilton City. In 2021, he was named the head coach for league rivals Scarborough SC. In his debut season with Scarborough, he led the team to the ProSound Cup final but was defeated by FC Vorkuta in a penalty shootout. He also successfully led Scarborough to a CSL Championship by defeating Vorkuta in the playoffs.

Medić re-signed with Scarborough for the 2022 season. He led Scarborough to an undefeated streak of 17 matches that stemmed from the previous season. Under his helm, the club secured a playoff berth by finishing third in the standings. In the preliminary round of the postseason, the eastern Toronto side defeated BGH City. Further success followed in the second round, where Scarborough reached the championship final for the sixth consecutive time as they defeated York Region Shooters. In the championship match, the rebranded Vorkuta, known as FC Continentals, defeated Scarborough.

== Honours ==
=== Player ===
Serbian White Eagles

- CSL Championship: 2008
- Canadian Soccer League International Division: 2006, 2007, 2009

Individual

- Canadian Soccer League Defender of the Year: 2009

=== Manager ===
Serbian White Eagles

- CSL Championship: 2016

Scarborough SC

- CSL Championship: 2021
- CSL Championship runner-up: 2022
