= Taha Ilyass =

Canadian soccer player (born 1997)

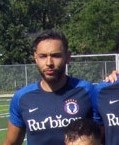
- Ilyass in 2022

Personal information
- Date of birth: October 20, 1997 (age 29)
- Place of birth: Hamilton, Ontario, Canada
- Position: Forward

Team information
- Current team: Hamilton United

Youth career
- Hamilton Sparta SC
- Saltfleet SC
- Hamilton Serbians SC
- Oakville SC

Senior career*
Years	Team	Apps	(Gls)
2021–2022	Scarborough SC		
2022	Blue Devils FC	19	(19)
2023	Hamilton United	5	(1)
2023	Hamilton City		
2023–2024	Drina Zvornik	5	(0)
2024	ProStars FC	17	(6)
2025	Moghreb Tétouan	4	(0)
2026–	Hamilton United	1	(0)
- * Club domestic league appearances and goals as of May 1, 2026

Taha Ilyass (born October 20, 1997) is a Canadian soccer player who plays as a forward for Hamilton United in the Ontario Premier League 2.

== Early life ==
Ilyass played his youth soccer in the local Hamilton region with organizations such as Hamilton Sparta, Saltfleet, and Hamilton Serbians. He later became associated with the Oakville Soccer Club, where the club arranged a tryout for him abroad in Uruguay. Following his stint in South America, he secured a deal with Moroccan side Difaâ Hassani El Jadidi, where he featured in only practice and friendly matches. During his stint in Morocco, he acquired a Moroccan passport through his parents' lineage.

== Club career ==
In 2019, with the launch of the national Canadian Premier League, he successfully passed the Forge FC trials. After failing to secure a contract with Forge, he would play in the southern Ontario-based Canadian Soccer League with Scarborough SC in 2021. In his debut season with Scarborough, he participated in the invitational tournament known as the ProSound Cup, where he contributed a goal against Atletico Sporting Toronto, which advanced the club to the finals. Scarborough faced FC Vorkuta in the championship final but was defeated in a penalty shootout. He would also help the club secure the playoff berth by finishing second in the standings. In the opening round of the postseason, he recorded a hat-trick against the Serbian White Eagles, which advanced the eastern Toronto side to the championship final. Ilyass played in the championship match, where Scarborough successfully defeated Vorkuta.

He would return for another season with Scarborough the following year. In his sophomore season with the club, he assisted the club in securing a playoff berth by finishing third. For the second consecutive year, he helped Scarborough reach the championship final and contributed a goal in the semifinal match against York Region Shooters. He participated in the championship final once again, where Toronto was defeated by FC Continentals (formerly FC Vorkuta).

Ilyass would also split the 2022 season with the Blue Devils FC. He would help the club secure a playoff berth and finish second in the league scoring charts. He would feature in the league championship final against Vaughan Azzurri where Oakville was defeated. After the conclusion of the season, he was named to the league's all-star team. In 2023, he played with local side Hamilton United. He would also spend the early portion of the 2023 season once again in the CSL circuit with Hamilton City.

In the winter of 2023, he went abroad to play in Bosnia and Herzegovina's second division with Drina Zvornik.

In 2024, he played with ProStars FC in League1 Ontario and was named a Second Team All-Star. Ilyass returned to Morocco in 2025 to sign with Moghreb Tétouan.

== Honours ==
Scarborough SC

- CSL Championship: 2021
