= Leonid Husak =

Ukrainian footballer

Personal information
- Full name: Leonid Mykolayovych Husak
- Date of birth: 7 July 1987 (age 39)
- Place of birth: Odesa, Soviet Union
- Position: Defender

Team information
- Current team: FC Vorkuta

Senior career*
Years	Team	Apps	(Gls)
2002–2005	FC Chornomorets Odesa	0	(0)
2002–2004	→ FC Chornomorets-2 Odesa	18	(0)
2005–2008	Dniester Ovdiopol	45	(0)
2012–2013	FC SKA Odesa	17	(0)
2017–	FC Vorkuta		
- * Club domestic league appearances and goals as of 19 September 2019

Leonid Mykolaiovych Husak (Ukrainian: Леонід Миколайович Гусак; born 7 July 1987) is a Ukrainian footballer playing with FC Vorkuta in the Canadian Soccer League.

== Playing career ==
Husak began his football career as a product of the FC Chornomorets Odesa academy. In 2002, he advanced to play with FC Chornomorets-2 Odesa in the Ukrainian Second League. In 2005, he played with Dniester Ovdiopol, and played with the club for three seasons. In 2012, he signed with FC SKA Odesa in the Ukrainian Amateur Football League, and assisted in securing promotion to the Ukrainian Second League for the 2012–13 season.

In 2017, he played abroad in the Canadian Soccer League with FC Vorkuta. In his debut season with Vorkuta he assisted in securing the First Division title. In 2021, he assisted in securing Vorkuta's third regular season title.
