= Zoran Rajović =

Serbian footballer

Zoran Rajović Зоран Рајовић
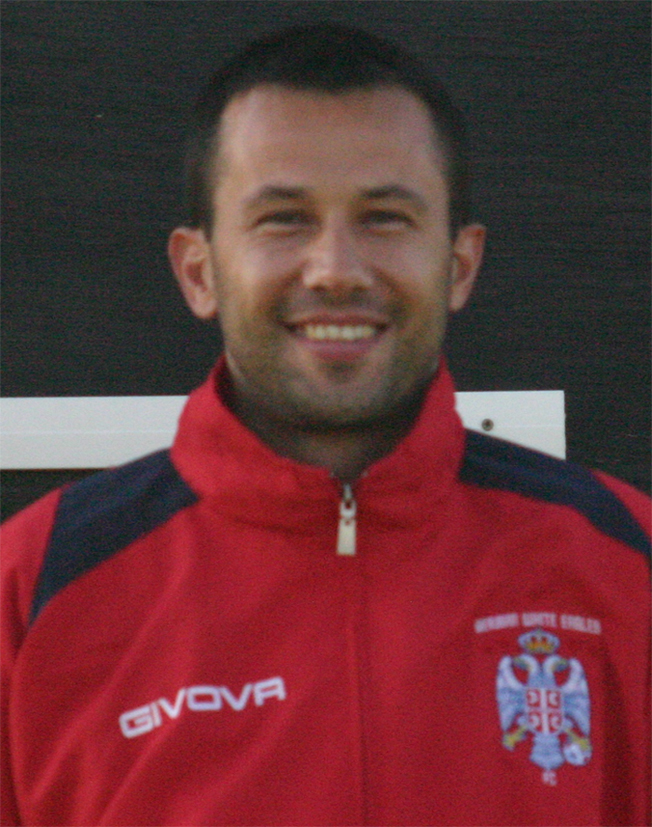
- Rajović in 2012

Personal information
- Date of birth: 28 October 1979 (age 47)
- Place of birth: Vinkovci, SR Croatia, SFR Yugoslavia
- Height: 1.77 m (5 ft 10 in)
- Position: Striker

Youth career
- Vojvodina

Senior career*
Years	Team	Apps	(Gls)
1997–1999	Vojvodina	1	(0)
1998	→ Vrbas (loan)	15	(4)
1999	→ Vrbas (loan)	4	(1)
1999–2000	Beroe Stara Zagora	19	(4)
2001	Dalian Shide		
2002	Vojvodina	2	(0)
2002–2004	Glasinac Sokolac	52	(27)
2004–2005	Zrinjski Mostar	30	(17)
2005	Ashdod		
2005–2006	Hapoel Kfar Saba		
2006	Ethnikos Piraeus	8	(0)
2007–2008	Zrinjski Mostar	31	(13)
2008–2009	Hajduk Kula	27	(6)
2009	Olimpik Sarajevo	8	(2)
2010	Diagoras	3	(0)
2010	Leotar	8	(2)
2011	Rudar Prijedor	7	(0)
2011	BEC Tero Sasana		
2012	Serbian White Eagles	22	(18)
2013	Yadanarbon		
2013–2014	Modriča		
2014–2015	Orašje	22	(8)
2015	Mladost Antin	4	(0)
2016	Orašje	7	(2)
2018–2020	Scarborough SC	22	(8)
2021	Serbian White Eagles		

International career
1997	FR Yugoslavia U18	1	(0)

Managerial career
- 2018–2020: Scarborough SC (player-coach)
- 2021–2022: Serbian White Eagles
- * Club domestic league appearances and goals

Zoran Rajović (Serbian Cyrillic: Зоран Рајовић; born 28 October 1979) is a Serbian football coach and former player.

== Club career ==
=== Early career ===
Born in Vinkovci, SR Croatia, SFR Yugoslavia, Rajović moved to Vojvodina at an early age. He was later sent on loan to Vrbas on two separate occasions. In the summer of 1999, Rajović moved to Bulgaria and joined Beroe Stara Zagora. He scored four league goals in 19 appearances, as the club avoided relegation from the top flight. In 2001, he played in Asia with Dalian Shide in the Chinese Super League. After a season in East Asia, he returned to the First League of FR Yugoslavia with Vojvodina.

=== Bosnia ===
In 2002, Rajović played in the Premier League of Bosnia and Herzegovina with Glasinac Sokolac. After the relegation of Sokolac, he secured a contract with league rivals Zrinjski Mostar. In his debut season with the club, he finished as the Premier League top scorer with 17 goals. He also helped the club secure their first Premier League title.

=== Middle East ===
After his championship season, he originally ventured out to the Middle East to play in the Israeli Premier League with Ashdod. Throughout his time with Ashdod, he made his first appearance in a continental tournament by participating in the 2005–06 UEFA Cup. He completed the season with league rivals Hapoel Kfar Saba.

In 2006, he returned to Europe to play in the Beta Ethniki with Ethnikos Piraeus.

=== Balkans ===
Following his spells throughout Europe, Rajović returned to his former club Zrinjski Mostar in the winter of 2008. During his second tenure with Zrinjski, he featured in his second continental tournament in matches against Partizan, and FK Rabotnički. He also assisted the club in securing the Bosnian Cup. He spent the next season in the Serbian SuperLiga with Hajduk Kula.

In the summer of 2009, he was originally linked with a move to Borac Banja Luka but he ultimately secured a deal with Bosnian side Olimpik Sarajevo. After a short stint in the country's capital, he departed during the winter transfer market. He returned to Greece to play in the second division with Diagoras. Shortly after his contract was terminated by the club.

After a brief stint in Greece, he returned to the Bosnian premier league in the summer of 2010 to sign with Leotar. His tenure with Leotar was short-lived as his contract was mutually terminated in the winter of 2011. League rivals Rudar Prijedor acquired Rajović for the remainder of the season. He left Rudar after the conclusion of the season.

=== Stints abroad ===
In 2011, Rajović returned to Asia to play with BEC Tero Sasana in the Thai Premier League.

In 2012, he played in the Canadian Soccer League with the Serbian White Eagles. In his debut season in the inter-provincial league, he finished the campaign as the club's top goal scorer with 18 goals from 22 appearances. On the club side, he helped the team secure a playoff berth by finishing sixth in the league's first division. In the opening round of the postseason, the western Toronto side defeated SC Toronto. Ultimately, the Serbs were eliminated from the competition in the semifinal round by rivals Toronto Croatia.

=== Later career ===
In early 2013, Rajović returned to the Indochina region, where he played in the Myanmar National League with Yadanarbon. For the remainder of the 2013–14 season, he returned to the Bosnian second-tier to sign with Modriča. Following a season with Modriča, he was transferred to Orašje. He had a brief stint in the regional Croatian circuit with Mladost Antin for the first portion of the 2015–16 season. Rajović returned for the remainder of the campaign to his former club Orašje.

In 2018, he returned to the Canadian circuit to become a player-coach for Scarborough SC. Where he won the league championship in 2019.

== International career ==
At the international level, Rajović was capped for FR Yugoslavia at under-18 level. He also featured in two unofficial matches for Bosnia and Herzegovina.

== Managerial career ==
In 2018, he was appointed as a player-coach for Scarborough SC in the Canadian Soccer League. In his debut season as a manager, he led the Toronto side to a playoff berth by finishing fourth in the first division. They would defeat Hamilton City in the opening round of the postseason. In the next round, Scarborough successfully defeated FC Ukraine United to qualify for the CSL Championship final. Scarborough would face Vorkuta in the championship finals, where they were defeated in a penalty shootout.

The following season the club finished as runners-up in the division and secured a postseason berth. In the playoffs, Rajović led the eastern Toronto team to the championship finals for the second consecutive season where they defeated Ukraine United. In 2020, he secured the club's first divisional title. For the third consecutive time, he led the club to the championship finals where they were defeated by Vorkuta.

In 2021, Rajović became the assistant coach for the Serbian White Eagles, and shortly after was promoted to head coach. He helped the team clinch a playoff berth and was eliminated in the first round by his former club Scarborough. He held this position until April 2022.

== Personal life ==
He holds Serbian, Croatian, and Bosnian-Herzegovinian passports. His father is former Dinamo Vinkovci player Milorad Rajović. Rajović was the agent of footballer Stefan Mitrović.

== Honours ==
=== Player ===
Zrinjski Mostar

- Bosnian Premier League: 2004–05
- Bosnian Cup: 2007–08

Individual

- Bosnian Premier League top scorer: 2004–05

=== Manager ===
Scarborough SC

- CSL Championship: 2019
- Canadian Soccer League First Division: 2020
