= Mykola Temnyuk =

Ukrainian footballer

Mykola Temniuk
Personal information
- Full name: Mykola Vasyloych Temniuk
- Date of birth: 31 March 1992 (age 34)
- Place of birth: Shepetivka, Khmelnytskyi Oblast, Ukraine
- Height: 1.84 m (6 ft 0 in)
- Position: Forward

Youth career
- 2007–2009: BVUFK Brovary

Senior career*
Years	Team	Apps	(Gls)
2012	Vodnyk Lviv	11	(2)
2012–2013	Stal Sanok	11	(0)
2016	Cosmos Nowotaniec	14	(0)
2016–2018	Ahrobiznes Volochysk	52	(30)
2018–2019	Nyva Ternopil	11	(1)
2019–2022	FC Vorkuta/Continentals	41	(31)
2023	Dynamo Toronto		
- * Club domestic league appearances and goals as of 31 March 2024

Mykola Temnyuk (born 31 March 1992) is a Ukrainian footballer who plays as a forward.

== Career ==
=== Europe ===
Temniuk was a product of BVUFK Brovary and later in 2012 played in the Ukrainian Amateur Football League with Vodnyk Lviv.

In 2012, he played abroad in Poland's III liga with Stal Sanok. After a season in the Polish fourth division, he returned to his native country in the spring of 2013. He would return to Poland to play with Cosmos Nowotaniec for the 2016 spring season.

After a season abroad, he returned to the Ukrainian Amateur Football League to play with FC Ahrobiznes Volochysk. During his tenure with Ahrobiznes, he assisted in securing promotion to the Ukrainian Second League in the 2016-17 season by winning the league title. He also finished as the league's top goal scorer with 18 goals in 18 matches.

The following season, the team secured promotion to the Ukrainian First League after winning the league. He also scored the club's first goal in the professional realm on 9 July 2017 against Ternopil in the 2017–18 Ukrainian Cup. He played in several matches for Ahrobiznes during the 2018–19 Ukrainian First League season but parted ways with the club on 27 August 2018. After his release, he signed a contract with Nyva Ternopil. After the conclusion of the season, his contract was terminated.

=== Canada ===
In 2019, he played abroad once more in the Canadian Soccer League with FC Vorkuta. In his debut season with Vorkuta, he assisted in securing the First Division title. He also finished as the league's top goalscorer with 18 goals. He played in the opening round of the playoffs against Kingsman SC and recorded a goal, but Vorkuta was eliminated from the competition in a penalty shootout. He was also featured in the Second Division championship final and contributed a goal against Serbian White Eagles B in a 2-0 victory.

The following season, he re-signed with Vorkuta. In his sophomore season with Vorkuta, he was featured in the CSL Championship final against Scarborough SC and assisted in securing the championship. Earlier he contributed a goal in the club's victory over the Serbian White Eagles in the first round of the postseason. In 2021, he assisted in securing Vorkuta's third regular-season title and secured the ProSound Cup against Scarborough. He also played in the 2021 playoffs, where Vorkuta was defeated by Scarborough in the championship final.

In 2022, Vorkuta was renamed FC Continentals, and he re-signed with the club for the season. Throughout the season, he helped Continentals secure a playoff berth by finishing fourth in the standings. He made his third consecutive championship final appearance against Scarborough, once again where he won his second championship title by recording two goals.

Following Continental's hiatus in 2023, he signed with the expansion franchise Dynamo Toronto.

== Career statistics ==
As of 24 December 2021

Appearances and goals by club, season and competition
Club	Season	League			National cup		League cup		Continental		Total	
Club	Season	Division	Apps	Goals	Apps	Goals	Apps	Goals	Apps	Goals	Apps	Goals
Stal Sanok	2012–13	III liga	11	0	—		—		—		11	0
Cosmos Nowotaniec	2015–16	IV liga	14	0	—		—		—		14	0
Ahrobiznes Volochysk	2017–18	Ukrainian Second League	29	8	3	1	—		—		32	9
Ahrobiznes Volochysk	2018–19	Ukrainian First League	4	0	1	0	—		—		5	0
Ahrobiznes Volochysk	Total		33	8	4	1	—		—		37	9
Nyva Ternopil	2018–19	Ukrainian Second League	11	1	0	0	—		—		11	1
Vorkuta	2019	Canadian Soccer League	17	18	—		—		—		17	18
Vorkuta	2020	Canadian Soccer League	8	5	—		—		—		8	5
Vorkuta	2021	Canadian Soccer League	6	5	—		—		—		6	5
Vorkuta	Total		31	28	—		—		—		31	28
Career total			100	37	4	1	0	0	0	0	104	38

== Honours ==
FC Ahrobiznes Volochysk

- Ukrainian Amateur Football Championship: 2016–17
- Ukrainian Second League: 2017–18

Vorkuta

- CSL Championship: 2020, 2022
- Canadian Soccer League First Division/Regular Season: 2019, 2021
- ProSound Cup: 2021

Individual

- Ukrainian Football Amateur Championship top scorer: 2016–17
- CSL Golden Boot: 2019
