= 2021 Canadian Soccer League season =

Professional soccer league season

Canadian Soccer League
- Season: 2021
- Dates: August 28 – October 10 (regular season); October 30 – November 7 (playoffs)
- Champions: FC Vorkuta (regular season); Scarborough SC (playoffs, 2nd title)
- ProSound Cup: FC Vorkuta
- Matches: 28
- Goals: 89 (3.18 per match)
- Top goalscorer: Wabila Wallace (7)
- Biggest home win: Scarborough SC 6–1 Toronto Tigers (August 28, 2021); FC Vorkuta 6–0 Serbian White Eagles (September 11, 2021)
- Biggest away win: Euru Futbol Academy 2–4 BGH City FC (September 4, 2021); Euru Futbol Academy 0–4 FC Vorkuta (October 9, 2021)
- Longest winning run: 4 matches Scarborough SC; FC Vorkuta
- Longest unbeaten run: 7 matches Scarborough SC; FC Vorkuta
- Longest winless run: 7 matches Euru Futbol Academy
- Longest losing run: 7 matches Euru Futbol Academy

The 2021 Canadian Soccer League season was the 24th season under the Canadian Soccer League name. The season officially commenced on August 28, 2021, and concluded with the CSL Championship final on November 7, 2021, at Centennial Park Stadium in Toronto, Ontario. The championship was contested between reigning champions FC Vorkuta and Scarborough SC, with Scarborough defeating Vorkuta for their second title. Vorkuta completed the season with a league double (regular season and ProSound Cup).

The league was delayed once again due to the COVID-19 pandemic, which created another modified, shortened schedule. The regular season was reformatted into an invitational competition named the ProSound Cup, which featured permanent league members and invitational clubs.

== Summary ==
The rivalry between title contenders Scarborough SC and FC Vorkuta for league supremacy was renewed throughout the 2021 campaign. As both clubs competed with one another for the league treble, and even managed to attract a respectable attendance number in one of their matches. Their rivalry was initially contested throughout the regular season, with Vorkuta ultimately laying claim to the regular-season title with a two-point difference between them. Vorkuta, aided by their Ukrainian imports, and under the new management of Andrei Malychenkov and Viktor Raskov, managed to control the top spot for the majority of the season by producing an undefeated regular season streak. They found further success by winning the invitational ProSound Cup after defeating their rivals, Scarborough, in a penalty shootout. The saga of their rivalry would conclude in the CSL Championship final.

Scarborough was also under new management, with Mirko Medić being given the head coach position. To remain competitive, Medić would further refine the roster with new additions. In the opening weeks of the season, Scarborough held the top spot before relinquishing the position permanently to Vorkuta and finished as runner-up. In the opening round of the CSL Championship, the club faced the Serbian White Eagles, as Vorkuta was given a bye to the finals. The match resulted in a victory for Scarborough, which marked the club's fifth consecutive championship final appearance. The eastern Toronto side successfully avoided a trophy-less season by defeating reigning champions Vorkuta for their second title.

The third position was contested between Atletico Sporting Toronto and BGH City FC, with Atletico ultimately securing the spot. Atletico Sporting Toronto, one of the invitational clubs, had an impressive run in the league, with the club holding the third position for the majority of the season. Toronto managed to gain a victory over the Serbian White Eagles and held Scarborough to a draw throughout the regular season. BGH City FC was formed after a merger between Brantford Galaxy and Hamilton City. The team held the third position just once throughout the season and consistently chased Atletico for the position. BGH City secured the final berth to the ProSound Cup but was ineligible to compete in the tournament due to financial issues.

The Serbian White Eagles finished fifth in the standings with a single-point difference from BGH City. The White Eagles were originally managed by Uroš Stamatović, but after a string of poor performances, Zoran Rajović was named his successor. As BGH City was considered ineligible to compete in the ProSound Cup, their berth was given to Serbia. The Serbs were defeated in the opening round by Vorkuta. Toronto Tigers, another invitational club, finished sixth in the standings and were tied with Serbia with only a difference in goals scored. The remaining positions were contested between Euru Futbol Academy and St. Catharines Hrvat, with St. Catharines finishing seventh and Euru Futbol Academy finishing at the bottom of the standings.

== Changes from 2020 ==
In early 2021, the founder of Coffee Time, former league equity owner Tom Michalopoulos, and match announcer Enio Perruzza died during the offseason. As the season began to mobilize, the administration and marketing responsibilities of the league were assigned to a sports management firm named Primetime Sports Marketing Inc. The schedule was released in early August, with the season debuting on August 14, 2021, with all matches being scheduled at Centennial Park Stadium. The regular season was reformatted into an invitational competition named the ProSound Cup, with a postseason format for the title. Following the conclusion of the ProSound Cup, the CSL member clubs competed in a knockout bracket for the CSL Championship, which was exclusively reserved for permanent league members (without the invitational clubs).

The structure of the competition featured league members along with four entries from the amateur level. All league members from the previous season returned except Brantford Galaxy and Hamilton City, which merged to form BGH City FC. The invitational clubs were Atletico Sporting Toronto, Euru Futbol Academy, St. Catharines Hrvat, and Toronto Tigers. The opening of the season was delayed to August 28, 2021, to acquire insurance for the usage of Centennial Park Stadium.

== Teams ==
Team	City	Stadium	Manager	Status
Atletico Sporting Toronto	Toronto, Ontario	Centennial Park Stadium	Ronald Brinez	Invitational club
BGH City	Brantford, Ontario & Hamilton, Ontario	Centennial Park Stadium	Milan Prpa	Member Club (Note: BGH City was formed from a merger of member club Brantford Galaxy and Hamilton City, however they did not participate in the CSL Championship reserved for league members at the end of the season)
Euru Futbol Academy	Hamilton, Ontario	Centennial Park Stadium		Invitational Club
FC Vorkuta	Vaughan, Ontario (Woodbridge)	Centennial Park Stadium	Andrei Malychenkov; Viktor Raskov	Member Club
Scarborough SC	Toronto, Ontario (Scarborough)	Centennial Park Stadium	Mirko Medić	Member Club
Serbian White Eagles	Toronto, Ontario (Etobicoke)	Centennial Park Stadium	Zoran Rajović	Member Club
St. Catharines Hrvat	St. Catharines, Ontario	Centennial Park Stadium	Martin Mamic	Invitational Club
Toronto Tigers	Toronto, Ontario	Centennial Park Stadium		Invitational Club

=== Coaching changes ===
Team	Outgoing coach	Manner of departure	Date of vacancy	Position in table	Incoming coach	Date of appointment
Serbian White Eagles	Uroš Stamatović	Replaced	September 18, 2021	8th in September	(Serbia) Zoran Rajović	September 18, 2021

Location of CSL teams outside of Toronto for the 2021 CSL season.

Location of CSL teams in Toronto for the 2021 CSL season.

== Standings ==
Pos	Team	Pld	W	D	L	GF	GA	GD	Pts
1	FC Vorkuta (X)	7	6	1	0	22	1	+21	19
2	Scarborough SC (C)	7	5	2	0	19	4	+15	17
3	Atletico Sporting Toronto	7	4	1	2	13	6	+7	13
4	BGH City FC	7	3	1	3	10	10	0	10
5	Serbian White Eagles	7	3	0	4	8	16	−8	9
6	Toronto Tigers	7	3	0	4	7	15	−8	9
7	St. Catharines Hrvat	7	1	1	5	6	16	−10	4
8	Euru Futbol Academy	7	0	0	7	4	21	−17	0

Source: []
Rules for classification: 1) points; 2) total wins; 3) head-to-head points; 4) goal differential; 5) most goals
(C) Champions; (X) Regular season champion

=== Positions by round ===
Team ╲ Round	1	2	3	4	5	6	7
Atletico Sporting Toronto	3	7	3	3	3	3	3
BGH City FC	7	3	4	4	4	4	4
Euru Futbol Academy	4	5	7	8	8	8	8
FC Vorkuta	2	2	1	1	1	1	1
Scarborough SC	1	1	2	2	2	2	2
Serbian White Eagles	5	6	8	7	6	6	5
St. Catharines Hrvat	6	4	6	5	7	7	7
Toronto Tigers	8	8	5	6	5	5	6

== ProSound Cup ==
=== Semifinal ===
October 17, 2021	FC Vorkuta	2–1	Serbian White Eagles	Toronto, Ontario
16:00	Ivlyev; Chornomaz	Report	Marko Stajic 66'	Stadium: Centennial Park Stadium; Referee: Ramee Arbaji

October 17, 2021	Scarborough SC	2–0 (a.e.t.)	Atletico Sporting Toronto	Toronto, Ontario
18:15	Reid 95'; Ilyass 118'	Report		Stadium: Centennial Park Stadium

=== Finals ===
October 24, 2021	FC Vorkuta	0–0 (a.e.t.) (4–2 p)	Scarborough SC	Toronto, Ontario
19:00		Report		Stadium: Centennial Park Stadium; Referee: Timur Qayoumi
	Penalties
	Halchuk (penalty scored); Ivlyev (penalty scored); Solonynko (penalty scored); Hostyev (penalty scored)		Marco Johansen (penalty scored); Reid (penalty scored)

== CSL Championship ==
After the conclusion of the ProSound Cup featuring the CSL clubs and the invitational clubs, the CSL Championship was held with participation limited to the CSL member clubs.

Semifinal			Final
			1	FC Vorkuta	1
2	Scarborough SC	7	2	Scarborough SC	4
5	Serbian White Eagles	5

=== Semifinal ===
October 30, 2021	Scarborough SC	7–5 (a.e.t.)	Serbian White Eagles	Toronto, Ontario
15:00	Dimitrov 24'; Limane 31', 36'; Ilyass 71', 109', Lukas Risto 101'	Report	Marko Stajic; Vladimir Strizovic 33'; Rajović 60', 79',	Stadium: Centennial Park Stadium

=== Finals ===
November 7, 2021	FC Vorkuta	1–4	Scarborough SC	Toronto, Ontario
15:00	Halchuk 79'	Report	Milos Scepanovic 5', 85'; Limane 27', 32'	Stadium: Centennial Park Stadium; Referee: Craig Williams

== Season statistics ==
=== Goals ===
Rank	Player	Club	Goals
1	Wabila Wallace	Atletico Sporting Toronto	7
2	(Serbia) Vladimir Strizovic	Serbian White Eagles	5
2	(Ukraine) Mykola Temnyuk	FC Vorkuta	5
3	(Ukraine) Bohdan Borovskyi	FC Vorkuta	4
3	(Slovenia) Gregor Žugelj	St. Catharines Hrvat	4
4	Taha Ilyass	Scarborough SC	3
4	(Serbia) Petar Đjorđjević	BGH City FC	3

=== Hat-tricks ===
Player	Club	Against	Result	Date
(Ukraine) Bohdan Borovskyi	FC Vorkuta	Serbian White Eagles	6–0 (H)	11 September 2021
(Slovenia) Gregor Žugelj	St. Catharines Hrvat	Euru Academy	4–1 (H)	14 September 2021
(Serbia) Vladimir Strizovic	Serbian White Eagles	St. Catharines Hrvat	4–1 (H)	18 September 2021
