= Andrei Malychenkov =

Russian footballer

Andrey Malyshenkov
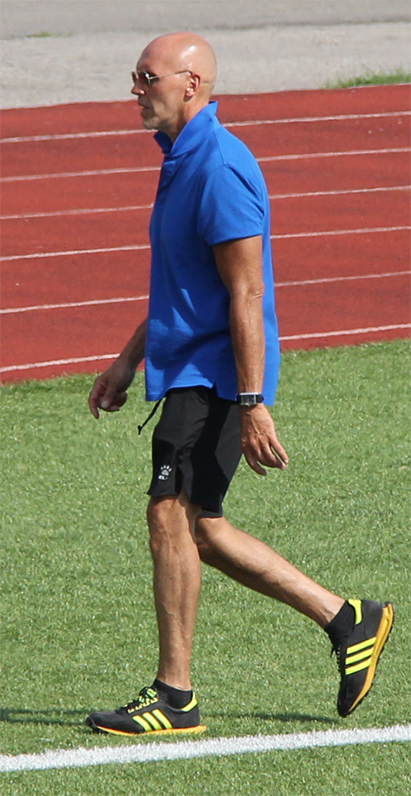
- Malychenkov in 2022

Personal information
- Full name: Andrey Yuryevich Malyshenkov
- Date of birth: March 28, 1968 (age 58)
- Place of birth: Leningrad, Soviet Union
- Height: 1.84 m (6 ft 0 in)
- Position: Midfielder

Senior career*
| Years | Team | Apps | (Gls) |
| 1986 | Dynamo Leningrad | 5 | (0) |
| 1991 | Kirovets St. Petersburg | 38 | (0) |
| 1992–1995 | Smena-Saturn St. Petersburg | 110 | (6) |
| 1996 | FC Gatchina | 31 | (3) |
| 1997 | FC Dynamo Saint Petersburg | 20 | (0) |
| 1998 | Smena-Saturn St. Petersburg | | |
| 1999 | Spartak-Orekhovo Orekhovo-Zuyevo | 10 | (1) |
| 1999 | FC Metallurg Lipetsk | 1 | (0) |
| 2000–2004 | North York Astros | | |
| 2007–2015 | FC Ukraine United | | |

Managerial career
- 2012–2018: FC Ukraine United
- 2021: FC Ukraine United
- 2021–2022: FC Vorkuta/Continentals
- * Club domestic league appearances and goals

Andrey Yuryevich Malyshenkov (Russian: Андрей Юрьевич Малышенков; born March 28, 1968) is a former Russian footballer who played as a midfielder and football manager.

== Club career ==
=== Russia ===
Malyshenkov began his career in 1986 with Dynamo St. Petersburg in the Soviet First League. He later played with Kirovets Leningrad, a club affiliated with the Kirov machine-building factory. After the dissolution of the Soviet Union in late 1991, he played in the newly formed Russian Second League with Smena-Saturn St. Petersburg in 1992. After four seasons with Smena-Saturn, he remained in the third tier with FC Gatchina. Following a season with Gatchina, he returned to his former club Dynamo St. Petersburg.

In 1999, he played in the Russian First Division with the newly promoted Spartak-Orekhovo Orekhovo-Zuyevo. He made 11 appearances and recorded 1 goal in the second tier. He later played with FC Metallurg Lipetsk.

=== Canada ===
He went abroad to Canada in 2000 to sign with North York Astros of the Canadian Professional Soccer League. He re-signed with North York for the 2001 season. In the 2002 season, North York secured a postseason berth and reached the CPSL Championship finals against Ottawa Wizards, but lost to a score of 2–0.

== Managerial career ==
=== Ukraine United ===
After his retirement, he helped to form FC Ukraine United, which competed in the Ontario Soccer League (OSL), where he served as a player/coach. When Ukraine United was granted a franchise in the Canadian Soccer League in 2016, he continued serving as the head coach. Malyshenkov would secure a playoff berth for the club as they finished as runner-ups in the league's first division. In the opening round of the postseason, Ukraine defeated Brantford Galaxy. The club was ousted from the playoff tournament by the Serbian White Eagles in the next round.

He re-signed with Ukraine for the 2018 season. The club secured the divisional title by finishing first in the standings. In the playoffs, United faced Brantford in the quarterfinals and advanced to the next round from a penalty shootout. However, they were eliminated by Scarborough SC in the next round. He returned to manage Ukraine United in 2021 in the OSL.

=== Vorkuta/Continentals ===
He was also named the head coach for FC Vorkuta in 2021. In his debut season with Vorkuta, he led the team to a regular season title and won the ProSound Cup by defeating Scarborough SC. He also led Vorkuta to the CSL Championship final but was defeated by Scarborough.

In 2022, Vorkuta was rebranded into FC Continentals, and he resumed his managerial duties for the 2022 season. He led the club to the championship final for the second consecutive season, where the Continentals successfully defeated Scarborough.

== Honours ==
=== Player ===
North York Astros

- CPSL Championship runner-up: 2002

=== Manager ===
FC Continentals

- CSL Championship: 2022
- Canadian Soccer League Regular Season: 2021
- ProSound Cup: 2021

FC Ukraine United

- Canadian Soccer League First Division: 2018
- Canadian Soccer League Second Division: 2017
- CSL II Championship: 2017
