= 2022 Canadian Soccer League season =

Professional soccer league season

Canadian Soccer League
- Season: 2022
- Dates: May 29 – August 6 (regular season); August 13 – August 27 (playoffs)
- Champions: FC Continentals (3rd title)
- Regular season champions: Serbian White Eagles (5th title)
- Matches: 30
- Goals: 102 (3.4 per match)
- Top goalscorer: Vladimir Strizovic (8)
- Biggest home win: Serbian White Eagles 7–3 BGH City FC (June 18, 2022)
- Biggest away win: BGH City FC 1–10 Serbian White Eagles (July 30, 2022)
- Longest winning run: 3 matches FC Continentals; York Region Shooters
- Longest unbeaten run: 7 matches Scarborough SC
- Longest winless run: 10 matches BGH City FC
- Longest losing run: 10 matches BGH City FC

The 2022 Canadian Soccer League season was the 25th season under the Canadian Soccer League name. The season began on May 29, 2022, and concluded with the CSL Championship on August 27, 2022, with FC Continentals defeating reigning champions Scarborough SC for their third championship title. The regular season title was secured by the Serbian White Eagles, which marked their fifth league divisional title.

== Summary ==
=== Regular season contenders ===
The race for the regular season title was a highly competitive bout, as the outcome was decided on the final match of the regular season. Four teams dominated the race, and all had an opportunity to clinch the spot. The Serbian White Eagles laid claim to the title with only a single point separating them from the York Region Shooters.

The previous time the Serbs won a divisional title was in the 2015 season. Former head coach Uroš Stamatović returned at the helm and assembled a competitive roster with a mixture of domestic and import players from Serbia. One notable domestic signing was former Canadian international Dejan Jakovic. After a four-year absence, York Region returned to the fold and finished as runners-up. The Vaughan-based club primarily consisted of younger domestic players and remained competitive as they led the way for six weeks.

Scarborough SC and FC Continentals were the final two major contenders, with the eastern Toronto side finishing third with a two-point difference from the Serbs. The club renewed the contract of head coach Mirko Medić and continued Scarborough's undefeated streak, which stemmed from the previous season, to 17 matches. FC Continentals, the re-branded name of FC Vorkuta, occupied the fourth position with a three-point difference separating them from the champions. The Russian invasion of Ukraine directly affected the daily operations and on-field performance of FC Continentals as it restricted the team's access to player recruitment and to properly organize and achieve sufficient results throughout the season.

=== Other teams ===
The two remaining teams were BGH City FC and Toronto Falcons, which both finished in the bottom half of the standings. Toronto, an expansion side led by Willy Giummarra, relied upon local talent along with former FC Vorkuta veterans to remain competitive in the league and managed a fifth-place finish. As the COVID-19 pandemic restrictions were still enforced, both Brantford Galaxy and Hamilton City continued fielding their hybrid team that finished the season at the bottom of the standings.

=== Playoff champion ===
The landscape of the playoff scene included all six member clubs. The Serbian White Eagles and York Region Shooters were both given a bye to the second round of the competition. In the preliminary stages of the postseason, FC Continentals automatically advanced as the Toronto Falcons were disqualified as they failed to meet the requirements to compete in the playoffs. Scarborough also made the next round as they defeated BGH City.

Both the Serbs and York Region were eliminated in the semifinals, which set the stage for the third consecutive rematch between Continentals and Scarborough. The regular season champion was defeated by FC Continentals, while Scarborough eliminated the Shooters in extra time. In the championship match, the Continentals defeated Scarborough for their third playoff title.

== Changes from 2021 ==
The league returned to a five-month schedule. Two new entries were accepted into the league. The most notable returnee was the York Region Shooters, which previously played until the 2017 season and was a charter member from the 1998 CNSL–OPSL merger. The other addition was the Toronto Falcons, a club managed and organized by former FC Vorkuta general manager Samad Kadirov. A name change occurred with FC Vorkuta being renamed FC Continentals.

The league intended to launch the Enio Perruzza Memorial Trophy as a separate competition in tribute to former league announcer Enio Perruzza, who died the previous year. The Memorial Trophy was to be an open tournament featuring league members along with invitational clubs. The playoffs would commence in early August, with the championship final being scheduled for August 27, 2022. The season would resume activity throughout September and October for the invitational Memorial Trophy, but the tournament was rescheduled for the next season due to the lack of available stadiums.

== Teams ==
Team	City	Stadium	Manager
BGH City FC	Brantford, Ontario and Hamilton, Ontario	Centennial Park Stadium	Sasa Vukovic
FC Continentals	Vaughan, Ontario	Centennial Park Stadium	Andrei Malychenkov
Scarborough SC	Toronto, Ontario (Scarborough)	Centennial Park Stadium	Mirko Medić
Serbian White Eagles	Toronto, Ontario (Etobicoke)	Centennial Park Stadium	Uroš Stamatović
Toronto Falcons	Toronto, Ontario	Centennial Park Stadium	Willy Giummarra
York Region Shooters	Vaughan, Ontario	Centennial Park Stadium	Sam Medeiros

=== Coaching changes ===
Team	Outgoing coach	Manner of departure	Date of vacancy	Position in table	Incoming coach	Date of appointment
BGH City FC	Matija Popovic; Milan Prpa	Replaced	June 2, 2022	preseason	Sasa Vukovic	June 2, 2022
FC Continentals	Viktor Raskov	Replaced	May 28, 2022	4th	Andrei Malychenkov	June 2022

== Standings ==
Pos	Team	Pld	W	D	L	GF	GA	GD	Pts	Qualification
1	Serbian White Eagles (X)	10	5	4	1	29	13	+16	19	Playoff semifinals
2	York Region Shooters	10	5	3	2	18	12	+6	18	Playoff semifinals
3	Scarborough SC	10	4	5	1	20	8	+12	17	Playoff quarterfinals
4	FC Continentals (C)	10	4	4	2	17	10	+7	16	Playoff quarterfinals
5	Toronto Falcons	10	1	4	5	9	23	−14	7	Ineligible for Playoffs (Note: Toronto Falcons failed to meet the necessary requirements to compete in the playoffs)
6	BGH City FC	10	0	2	8	9	36	−27	2	Playoff quarterfinals

Source: []
Rules for classification: 1) points; 2) total wins; 3) head-to-head points; 4) goal differential; 5) most goals
(C) Champions; (X) Regular season champion

== Playoffs ==
=== Quarterfinals ===
August 13, 2022	FC Continentals	Cancelled (Note: FC Continentals were given a bye, with the score listed as 2-0, as Toronto Falcons failed to meet the competition requirements for the playoffs)	Toronto Falcons	Toronto, Ontario
16:00		Report; Report		Stadium: Esther Shiner Stadium

August 13, 2022	Scarborough SC	3–2	BGH City FC	Toronto, Ontario
18:00	Misel Klisara 3'; Radaković 5'; Zelenbaba 48'	Report	Petar Djordjevic 12'; Sandro Rajkovic 42'	Stadium: Esther Shiner Stadium

=== Semifinals ===
August 20, 2022	Serbian White Eagles	0–2	FC Continentals	Toronto, Ontario
16:00		Report; Report	Borovskyi 31'; Basel Rashrash 78'	Stadium: Esther Shiner Stadium; Referee: Timur Qayoumi

August 20, 2022	York Region Shooters	1–3 (a.e.t.)	Scarborough SC	Toronto, Ontario
18:00	Mahmood Mehdi 33'	Report	Misel Klisara 7', 107'; Ilyass 113'	Stadium: Esther Shiner Stadium

=== Finals ===
August 27, 2022	Scarborough SC	1–2	FC Continentals	Toronto, Ontario
20:00	Misel Klisara	Report	Temnyuk 44', 48'	Stadium: Lamport Stadium; Referee: Carlos Rodriguez

== Season statistics ==
=== Goals ===
Rank	Player	Club	Goals
1	Vladimir Strizovic	Serbian White Eagles	8
2	Dusan Kovacevic	Serbian White Eagles	7
3	Nikola Đurković	Serbian White Eagles	6
4	Oleksiy Boyko	FC Continentals	4
5	Petar Đjorđjević	BGHC FC	3
5	Moussa Limane	Scarborough SC	3
5	Mahmoud Mehdi	York Region Shooters	3
5	Mykola Temnyuk	FC Continentals	3
9	Gonzalo Matias Cabrera Celis	Scarborough SC	2
9	Osman Hussein	York Region Shooters	2

=== Hat-tricks ===
Player	Club	Against	Result	Date
Nikola Đurković	Serbian White Eagles	BGHC	7–3 (H)	19 June 2022
Dusan Kovacevic	Serbian White Eagles	BGHC	10–1 (A)	30 July 2022
