= 2020 Canadian Soccer League season =

Professional soccer league season

Canadian Soccer League
- Season: 2020
- Dates: August 15 – October 3 (regular season); October 10 – October 17 (playoffs)
- Champions: Scarborough SC (First Division regular season); FC Vorkuta (First Division playoffs, 2nd title)
- Matches: 20
- Goals: 82 (4.1 per match)
- Top goalscorer: Moussa Limane (7)
- Biggest home win: Scarborough SC 7–2 Hamilton City (August 22, 2020)
- Biggest away win: Brantford Galaxy 2–5 FC Vorkuta (September 5, 2020)
- Longest winning run: 4 matches Scarborough SC
- Longest unbeaten run: 5 matches FC Vorkuta
- Longest winless run: 7 matches Brantford Galaxy
- Longest losing run: 7 matches Brantford Galaxy

The 2020 Canadian Soccer League season was the 23rd season under the Canadian Soccer League name. The season commenced on August 15, 2020, and concluded with the CSL Championship final on October 17, 2020. FC Vorkuta defeated the reigning champions Scarborough SC at Racco Park in Vaughan, Ontario, and secured their second championship. Scarborough made their fourth consecutive appearance in the championship final and claimed their first divisional title.

As the COVID-19 pandemic delayed the opening of the season the league ultimately released a modified shortened schedule which began in early August with the matches taking place within Toronto at Esther Shiner Stadium, and Centennial Park Stadium except for the championship final being moved to Racco Park at Concord/Thornhill Regional Park in Vaughan, Ontario.

== Summary ==
The events throughout the regular season resembled the previous season, with the main theme being Scarborough SC and FC Vorkuta competing for the divisional and championship titles. As both teams were tied in points, the title was decided on the final match of the season, with Scarborough receiving their first division title by accumulating the most wins in the league's tie-breaker rules. In a bid to successfully defend their championship title, the eastern Toronto side made adjustments to the roster with the acquisition of additional imports. The additions proved successful as Scarborough remained competitive and primarily battled with Vorkuta for the top spot and held the position for the final four weeks of the campaign. Their rivalry would conclude in the CSL Championship final with Vorkuta securing their second championship title.

Vorkuta managed to retain their core veteran imports with former general manager Denys Yanchuk serving as the head coach. As a result, Vorkuta was a consistent challenger with the strongest defensive record and shifted between the first and second positions throughout the regular season. The Vaughan-based team earned their dividends in the championship final, where they defeated reigning champions, Scarborough. Included in that race for the divisional title was Hamilton City, where the Steeltown club held the third position for the majority of the season, with only a single point difference in claiming the title. Though Hamilton secured a postseason berth, the organization was prevented by the league from participating after finishing in a Not-in-Good Standing state.

The final playoff berth was secured by the Serbian White Eagles, which marked their fifteenth consecutive season of clinching a playoff berth since their return to the professional scene in 2006. The western Toronto side produced the best offensive record in the regular season but was eliminated in the first round of the championship playoffs by Vorkuta. For the second consecutive season, Brantford Galaxy concluded the season at the bottom of the standings and managed to dodge a winless season by winning their final match of the season.

== Changes from 2019 ==
On March 29, 2020, the CSL released a tentative match schedule due to the COVID-19 pandemic. Following recommendations from health officials, the schedule was prolonged for another month to fulfill the entire season by scheduling matches on weekdays. On July 8, 2020, the league announced its schedule, with the commencement of the league beginning in early August, with seven teams returning from the previous season. All the matches were scheduled to take place at Centennial Park Stadium in Toronto, Ontario, with Kingsman SC, FC Ukraine United, and SC Waterloo Region not participating for the season. The schedule was postponed for another week, with the season starting on August 15, 2020.

On June 27, 2020, the league officially released its 2020 schedule and confirmed the kickoff date for August 15, 2020, with all matches being played at Esther Shiner Stadium in August, and the remaining months at Centennial Park Stadium. Originally CSC Mississauga and SC Real Mississauga were announced as participating teams but were not included in the revised schedule.

== Teams ==
Team	City	Stadium	Manager
Brantford Galaxy	Brantford, Ontario	Esther Shiner Stadium; Centennial Park Stadium	Saša Vidović
FC Vorkuta	Vaughan, Ontario (Woodbridge)	Esther Shiner Stadium; Centennial Park Stadium	Denys Yanchuk
Hamilton City	Hamilton, Ontario (Stoney Creek)	Esther Shiner Stadium; Centennial Park Stadium	Sasa Vukovic
Scarborough SC	Toronto, Ontario (Scarborough)	Esther Shiner Stadium; Centennial Park Stadium	Zoran Rajović
Serbian White Eagles	Toronto, Ontario (Etobicoke)	Esther Shiner Stadium; Centennial Park Stadium	Uroš Stamatović

=== Coaching changes ===
Team	Outgoing coach	Manner of departure	Date of vacancy	Position in table	Incoming coach	Date of appointment
Brantford Galaxy	Milan Prpa	Replaced	October 3, 2020	5th in October	(Bosnia and Herzegovina) Saša Vidović	October 3, 2020

Location of First Division teams outside of Toronto for the 2020 CSL season.
First Division
Location of First Division teams in Toronto for the 2020 CSL season.
First Division

== Standings ==
Pos	Team	Pld	W	D	L	GF	GA	GD	Pts	
1	Scarborough SC (C)	8	5	0	3	18	16	+2	15	Playoffs
2	FC Vorkuta (O)	8	4	3	1	16	8	+8	15	Playoffs
3	Hamilton City	8	4	2	2	19	19	0	14	Ineligible for Playoffs (Note: Hamilton finished the season in a Not-in-Good Standing and were removed from the playoffs)
4	Serbian White Eagles	8	3	1	4	20	16	+4	10	Playoffs
5	Brantford Galaxy	8	1	0	7	9	23	−14	3	

Source: []
Rules for classification: 1) points; 2) total wins; 3) head-to-head points; 4) goal differential; 5) most goals
(C) Champions; (O) Play-off winners

=== Positions by round ===
Team ╲ Round	1	2	3	4	5	6	7	8
Brantford Galaxy	5	4	5	5	5	5	5	5
FC Vorkuta	2	1	2	1	2	2	3	2
Hamilton City SC	1	3	3	3	3	3	2	3
Scarborough SC	3	2	1	2	1	1	1	1
Serbian White Eagles	4	5	4	4	4	4	4	4

== Playoffs ==
Three teams advanced to the playoffs. Third seed Hamilton City ended the season in "Not-in-Good Standing", which resulted in their disqualification from the playoffs. The CSL Championship final was originally scheduled to take place at Centennial Park Stadium in Toronto, Ontario, but due to further provincial government restrictions regarding the COVID-19 pandemic, the venue was moved to Racco Park at Concord/Thornhill Regional Park in Vaughan, Ontario.

Semifinal			Final
			1	Scarborough SC	1
2	FC Vorkuta	2	2	FC Vorkuta	2
4	Serbian White Eagles	1

=== Semifinal ===
October 10, 2020	FC Vorkuta	2–1 (a.e.t.)	Serbian White Eagles	Toronto, Ontario
14:00	Temnyuk 70'; Melnyk 107'	Report	Vukomanović 37'	Stadium: Centennial Park Stadium

=== Finals ===
October 17, 2020	Scarborough SC	1–2	FC Vorkuta	Vaughan, Ontario
15:00	Angel Angelov 40'	Report	Borovskyi 56'; Chornomaz 70'	Stadium: Racco Park; Referee: Braden K.

== Season statistics ==
=== Goals ===
Rank	Player	Club	Goals
1	(Central African Republic) Moussa Limane	Scarborough SC	7
2	(Canada) Luke Rankin	Hamilton City SC	6
3	(Canada) Dusan Kovacevic	Serbian White Eagles	5
3	(Ukraine) Mykola Temnyuk	FC Vorkuta	5
4	(Canada) Misel Klisara	Serbian White Eagles	4
5	Arsen Platis	Hamilton City SC	3

=== Hat-tricks ===
Player	Club	Against	Result	Date
(Central African Republic) Moussa Limane	Scarborough SC	Hamilton City	7–2 (H)	22 August 2020
(Canada) Luke Rankin	Hamilton City	Serbian White Eagles	4–3 (A)	5 September 2020
(Canada) Dusan Kovacevic	Serbian White Eagles	Scarborough SC	3–0 (H)	19 September 2020
