= FC Continentals =

Canadian association football team

- Full name: FC Continentals
- Founded: 2008; 18 years ago as FC Vorkuta
- Stadium: Centennial Park Stadium; Toronto, Ontario
- Owner(s): Igor Demitchev
- Chairman: Igor Demitchev
- Manager: Denys Yanchuk
- Coach: Andrei Malychenkov
- League: Canadian Soccer League
- 2022: Regular season: 4th Playoffs: Champions
- Website: https://continentalsfc.com/

FC Continentals was a Canadian soccer club founded in 2008. The team was a member of the Canadian Soccer League. The club originally played under the name FC Vorkuta and was renamed FC Continentals in 2022. Their home venue was Centennial Park Stadium in Toronto, Ontario.

== History ==
The club was formed by Russian immigrants Igor Demitchev and Samad Kadirov in Toronto in 2008. The club derived its name from the main financier Demitchev's hometown Vorkuta in Russia. Initially the club operated at the amateur level in the Downtown Polson Pier Soccer League. In their debut season, Vorkuta achieved instant success after clinching both the regular and postseason titles. Within a year, the club transferred to the Thornhill Soccer Club League, and continued its uphill climb to success by winning the playoff title.

In 2010, the team remained in the York Region territory by joining the Richmond Hill Soccer League, and the Downsview Hangar Indoor Soccer League. In 2016, the organization decided to make the transition to the professional ranks by applying for membership in the Canadian Soccer League. After presenting a successful strategic business plan, the club received the necessary votes in order to be approved by the league ownership. In preparation for the 2017 CSL season, the team hired the services of Serhiy Zayets as head coach. Zayets assembled a roster with several key CSL veterans acquired primarily from FC Ukraine United. The acquisitions included Sergiy Ivliev, Oleg Shutov, Mykhailo Bulkin, Vitaliy Dnistryan, Danylo Lazar, Vadym Gostiev, and Oleh Kerchu was assigned the team captain. In addition to the CSL veterans, several imports were brought in from Ukraine and Russia to further strengthen the roster.

Vorkuta made their professional debut on May 27, 2017 against Milton SC with a 7–0 victory with goals coming from Kerchu, Lazar, Shutov, Gostiev, and Yaroslav Svorak. In the club's inaugural season at the professional level, Vorkuta managed to produce a significant result. By clinching the regular season title, and establishing the best offensive record with the second best defensive record. In the preliminary round of the postseason, they defeated Royal Toronto FC by a score of 6–3. Their 2017 campaign came to a conclusion in the following round after a 1–0 defeat to Scarborough SC.

In 2018, the club produced a notable season by securing the CSL Championship, and found further success in the Second Division as its reserve squad secured the double (division title and DII Championship). In 2022, the club was renamed FC Continentals.

Following their 2022 championship title, FC Continentals went on a hiatus prior to the start of the 2023 season.

== Crest ==
The crest used from 2008 to 2021

The club's first crest was in the shape of a circle with a soccer ball placed in the center and the club's name beneath it. The colors of the crest were blue, red, and white, which represented the colors of the Canadian and the city of Toronto flags. On top of the crest was barbed wire, which symbolized the owner's birthplace, Vorkuta in Siberia, Russia, where a former Gulag labor camp was located.

In 2022, the club's name was changed to FC Continentals, resulting in a rebranding of the club's logo.

== Players ==
=== Current squad ===
As of 31 July 2023

Note: Flags indicate national team as defined under FIFA eligibility rules; some limited exceptions apply. Players may hold more than one non-FIFA nationality.

No.	Pos.	Nation	Player
–	DF	UKR	Oleksandr Alyeksyeyev
–	DF	UKR	Maksym Banasevych
–	FW	UKR	Oleksiy Boyko
–	MF	UKR	Bohdan Borovskyi
–	GK		Andrei Ciurchin
–	DF	MEX	Jesus Eduardo Compean Gonzalez
–	DF	UKR	Leonid Husak
–	FW	UKR	Serhiy Ivlyev
–	DF	UKR	Serhiy Melnyk
–	GK	UKR	Oleksandr Musiyenko
–	DF	UKR	Borys Orlovskyi

No.	Pos.	Nation	Player
–	DF	UKR	Illya Piltenko
–	MF	UKR	Serhiy Pitel
–	FW	UKR	Viktor Raskov
–	MF	UKR	Pavlo Shulhan
–	MF	UKR	Andriy Sorokin
–	GK	UKR	Anatoliy Starushchenko
–	FW	UKR	Mykola Temnyuk
–	DF	UKR	Mykyta Tkachov
–	MF	UKR	Vitaliy Tymofiyenko
–	MF	UKR	Serhiy Ursulenko

== Head coaches ==
- Serhiy Zayets (2017)
- Samad Kadirov (2018)
- Denys Yanchuk (2020)
- Andrei Malychenkov & Viktor Raskov (2021)
- Andrei Malychenkov (2022–)

== Honours ==
FC Continentals

- CSL Championship: 2018, 2020, 2022
- CSL Championship runner-up: 2021
- Canadian Soccer League First Division/Regular Season: 2017, 2019, 2021
- Canadian Soccer League First Division runner-up: 2018, 2020
- ProSound Cup: 2021

FC Continentals II

- CSL II Championship: 2018, 2019
- Canadian Soccer League Second Division: 2018, 2019

== Seasons ==
=== First team ===
Season	League	Teams	Record	Rank	Playoffs	Ref
2017	Canadian Soccer League (First Division)	8	10–2–2	1st	Semifinals	
2018	Canadian Soccer League (First Division)	9	12–2–2	2nd	Champions	
2019	Canadian Soccer League (First Division)	10	15–3–0	1st	Quarterfinals	
2020	Canadian Soccer League (First Division)	5	4–3–1	2nd	Champions	
2021	Canadian Soccer League	8	6–1–0	1st	Finals	
2022	Canadian Soccer League	6	4–4–2	4th	Champions	

=== Second team ===
Season	League	Teams	Record	Rank	Playoffs	Ref
2017	Canadian Soccer League (Second Division)	8	8–0–6	3rd	Semifinals	
2018	Canadian Soccer League (Second Division)	6	12–1–2	1st	Champions	
2019	Canadian Soccer League (Second Division)	6	13–0–2	1st	Champions	
