= Canadian Soccer League =

Men's soccer league in Canada

- Founded: 1998; 28 years ago (as CPSL); 2006; 20 years ago (as CSL)
- Country: Canada
- Confederation: CONCACAF (1998–2013); Non-FIFA (2014–present)
- Number of clubs: 2
- Current champions: Scarborough SC (2026)
- Most championships: Toronto Croatia (6 titles)
- Website: canadiansoccerleague.ca
- Current: 2026 Canadian Soccer League season

The Canadian Soccer League (CSL; French: Ligue canadienne de soccer — LCS) is a semi-professional league for Canadian soccer clubs primarily located in the province of Ontario, and claims the history of the Canadian National Soccer League (CNSL). It is a non-FIFA league previously sanctioned by the Canadian Soccer Association (CSA), but now affiliated with the Soccer Federation of Canada (SFC). As of 2025, it consists of four teams, all located in Toronto, Ontario. The season usually runs from May to October, with most games played on the weekend followed by a playoff format to determine the overall champion.

The league was formed in 1998 as the Canadian Professional Soccer League (CPSL) by an alliance forged by the Ontario Soccer Association (OSA) with the Canadian National Soccer League. The new league was meant to provide opportunities for the development of players, coaches, and referees. The intention of the alliance was to form regional divisions across the nation under the CPSL banner with each divisional champion competing in a playoff format for the championship.

== History ==
=== Origins and establishment (1993–1998) ===
After the demise of the Canadian Soccer League (CSL) in 1992, Canada was without a Division 1 national professional league. The Canadian soccer landscape was fractured into several different foreign and regional senior leagues. When the CSL ceased operations, three of their clubs (the Vancouver Whitecaps, Toronto Blizzard, and Montreal Supra) joined the American Professional Soccer League, which then was the highest-tier league in the United States. The remaining clubs, except for the London Lasers, joined the National Soccer League (NSL), the country's oldest and only exclusively Canadian professional league. After the addition of the Winnipeg Fury, the league changed its name to the Canadian National Soccer League (CNSL).

Though the CNSL was primarily based in Ontario, it operated as a private league for several years after disputes with the Ontario Soccer Association (OSA). The OSA operated the Ontario Soccer League which was the top senior amateur league in the province, but Ontario was without a sanctioned professional league (as the CNSL was considered an outlaw league by the OSA). As a result, the OSA completed a study titled Image of the Game in 1995/1996, which led to plans of launching the Ontario Professional Soccer League in 1997 as a Division 3 league in the Canadian soccer league system. As the OSA failed to bring their project to fruition, they reached an agreement with the CNSL and formed an alliance to launch the Canadian Professional Soccer League (CPSL), beginning with an Ontario division in 1998.

The CPSL would serve as a link between the provincial senior leagues to the USL A-League/USISL clubs, and provide opportunities for the development of youth players and referees. The intention of the league was to form regional divisions under the CPSL banner, with each divisional champion competing in a playoff format for the championship. Michael Di Biase, the CNSL president, would serve as the commissioner and OSA administrator Bill Spiers was named league chairman. The founding members included four CNSL clubs London City, North York Astros, St. Catharines Wolves, Toronto Croatia, and four of the OPSL teams: Glen Shields, Mississauga Eagles, Toronto Olympians, and York Region Shooters.

=== Early years (1998–2004) ===
In the initial years of the CPSL, the on-field performance was dominated by Toronto Olympians and Ottawa Wizards, who had the financial support from corporations such as Coffee Time, and Oz Optics Ltd. While St. Catharines, and Toronto Croatia – two well established former CNSL clubs – were the prominent challengers in the early years, a change occurred in 2000 within the administration field of the league with Vince Ursini being appointed the president. The league was able to acquire a television deal with Rogers TV, which enabled the launch of its own television program, the CPSL Soccer Show, which garnered the highest ratings of Sunday programs shown on the channel. As a result, the league earned major sponsorship deals from Primus Canada, and the Government of Canada, which served as the sole sponsor for the CPSL Rookie of the Year Award.

In 2001, the CSA originally initiated a task force named the Canadian United Soccer League (CUSL), which formed a working partnership with the CPSL and the Canadian franchises in the USL A-League to forge a unified professional structure in the hopes of forming a Canadian first and second division domestic league. Meanwhile, the CPSL continued in its original mission of providing opportunities to players to a higher platform by striking an agreement with the Toronto Lynx of the USL A-League. The player agreement deal provided the Lynx access to use any CPSL talent upon request, which provided the players the opportunity to play at a higher level. Another effort conducted by the league was in 2003 with the opening of their domestic cup, the Open Canada Cup, to all Canadian professional and amateur clubs to provide a potential candidate for the CONCACAF Champions' Cup. The previous time a Canadian club competed in the Champions' Cup was in the 1976 CONCACAF Champions' Cup, represented by Toronto Italia in the predecessor league to the CPSL.

The league continued its selective, cautionary approach to team expansion, but witnessed a major expansion run in 2001 beyond the GTA and Ontario border to include Quebec and Ottawa franchises. The following season, it expanded to 14 clubs to include a Hamilton and another Toronto territory. Due to the increase of teams, CPSL management split the league into two conferences: Eastern and Western.

=== Kaplan years (2005–2009) ===
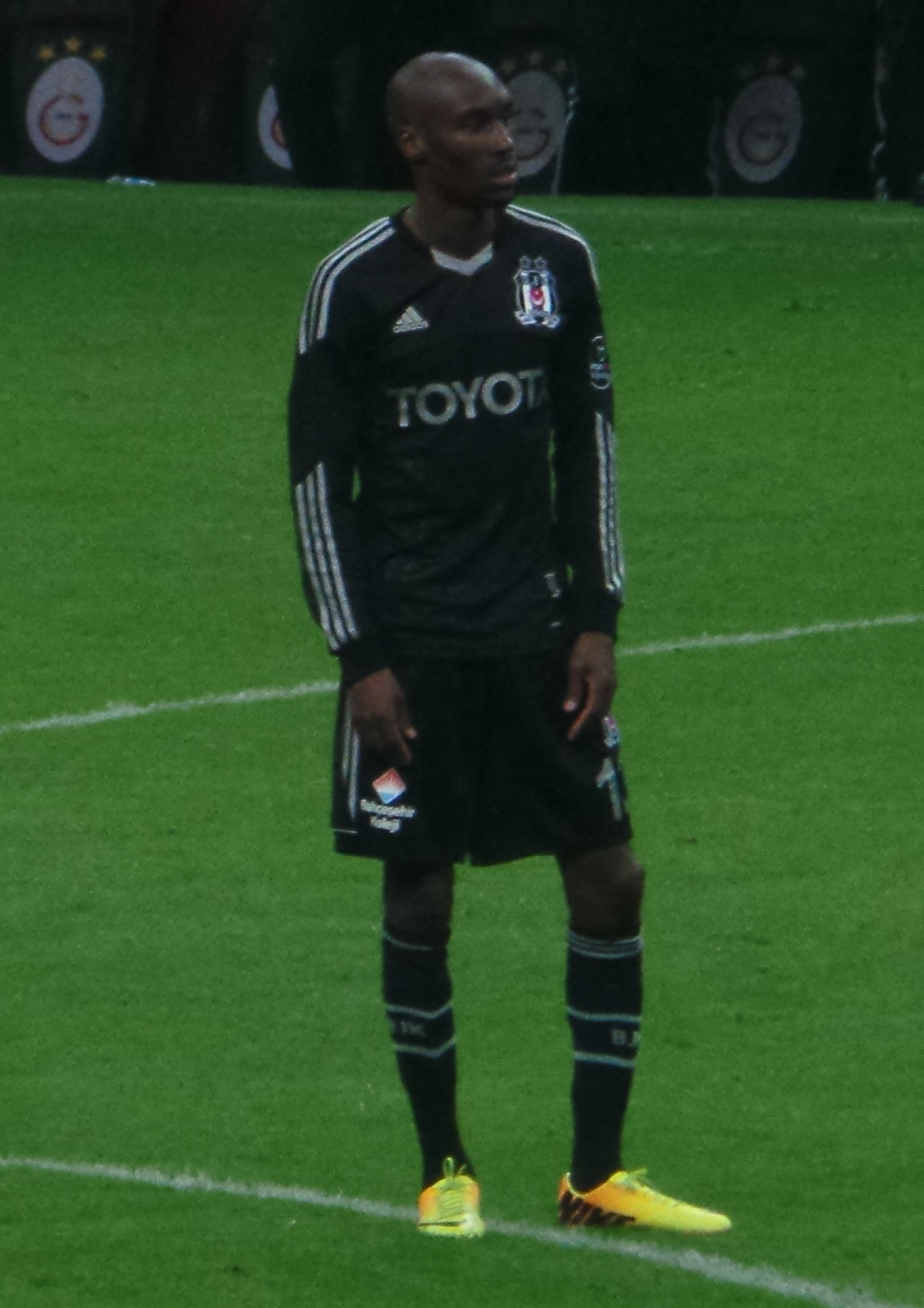
Canadian international Atiba Hutchinson began his career in the CPSL

After firmly establishing the league within the Ontario soccer structure, Ursini resigned from his position in order to fully delegate his time to his OSA obligations, and to seek election to the CSA board of directors. Former CPSL management consultant Cary Kaplan with previous experience as president of the Hamilton Bulldogs in the American Hockey League was named his successor in the capacity of a commissioner. One of his first acts was the creation of a Women's Canada Cup, as a preliminary tournament launched in the hopes of creating a future professional domestic league for women. In 2006, Kaplan began a series of reforms beginning with the creation of the National and International Division to replace the conference system. The intention of the reforms was to re-kindle the spirit of the CNSL days by promoting ethnic rivalries to increase match attendance.

A rebranding of the name was made to the Canadian Soccer League (CSL), with a new set of rules, regulations, and constitution established. The schedule format was changed including the relationship between the OSA and the Quebec Soccer Federation (QSF) was revised with the CSL by the signing of a "Memorandum of Understanding", which provided the CSL with an increased level of autonomy and eventual operational independence from the governing body in 2008. The outcome of the reforms witnessed a 50% increase in match attendance particularly in the GTA with the ethnic based teams attracting the most attention. Fan support would continue to increase for several seasons, with the Serbian White Eagles FC and Trois-Rivières Attak averaging the most. Media coverage was further increased after an arrangement made with Toronto Community News, which provided coverage to the league and its member clubs. Rogers TV made additional broadcasting commitments to expand their media coverage to a full season.

Several milestones were made in the Open Canada Cup tournament with the participation of the Toronto Lynx in 2006, and the expansion of the tournament to include teams from British Columbia in 2007. The CSL began an affiliation in 2007 with the Montreal Impact of the USL First Division by fielding their farm team the Trois-Rivières Attak in the National Division. Toronto FC of the Major League Soccer (MLS), owned by Maple Leaf Sports & Entertainment, established a relationship with the CSL in 2008 by entering TFC Academy to the National Division and TFC Academy II to the Reserve Division. As a result, the league became associated with two of Canada's top three professional soccer franchises by providing a feeder system to the top tier. In 2008, a Reserve Division was formed to build a developmental structure within the CSL and provide clubs with a larger player pool, sufficient playing time for injured players to recover, and a developmental platform for novice players to transition to the professional ranks.

On May 12, 2009, the CSL received conditional approval for membership with the Canadian Soccer Association (CSA). This paved the way for the CSL to create the effective player developmental system needed to provide the missing link between the top provincial amateur level to the MLS/USL on a national level.

=== CSA sanctioning and match fixing scandal (2010–2013) ===
After 4 1/2 years as commissioner, Kaplan resigned following the 2009 season in order to devote more time to his sports marketing company with Domenic Di Gironimo hired as his replacement. In 2010, the CSL was granted full membership in the CSA as a Division 3 sanctioned professional league in the Canadian soccer structure. Meanwhile, the CSL commissioner was awarded a seat on the CSA Professional Soccer Committee to further the planned expansion of the league to a fully national league with regional divisions under the CSL banner. The league was restructured by merging the International and National divisions to form the CSL First Division with a single table structure. While the Reserve Division expanded beyond the GTA boundary, and was reorganized in 2011 into the Second Division. Where it continued its traditional support role as a reserve, and entry level division for clubs with limited financial resources to meet the standards for a First Division club. A working relationship was struck with newly formed Canadian Academy of Futbol (CAF), which cemented a compete youth structure within the CSL infrastructure with member clubs operating their academy teams in CAF. Shortly following the completion of the 2010 season, De Gironimo announced his resignation from the league citing irreconcilable differences. Additional achievements under De Gironimo term was the sponsorship agreement made with Givova which granted the company the naming rights to the league, and to the CSL Championship. Other major sponsorships included Days Inns – Canada, and a record broadcasting agreement with Rogers TV, which provided additional match coverage to the provinces of Ontario, New Brunswick, and Newfoundland and Labrador. Finally, the addition of the Montreal Impact Academy as the second MLS academy club to join the league.

Former CPSL president and CSA financial director Vince Ursini returned to the organization as the successor to De Gironimo in 2011. The league's membership under Ursini's administration expanded to record amount of 28 teams in 2012 with 16 in the First Division and 12 in the Second Division. Their media coverage was broaden with a television agreement with CogecoTV, and the reintroduction of their weekly television program was picked up by Rogers TV.

On September 12, 2012, accounts of alleged match-fixing was reported by the CBC that a CSL game between the Trois-Rivières Attak and Toronto Croatia held in September 2009 was fixed. The report, which aired on the news program The National, revealed court documents showing that €15,000 ($18,000 CDN) in bribes were paid to several players on Toronto Croatia. The game was part of a larger match-fixing scandal in Europe in which six people were convicted. In response to the allegations of match fixing the CSL issued a statement stating that the league would continue to conduct the necessary steps in order to prevent any future tampering of matches.

Prior to the 2013 season, the CSA informed the CSL that the league would no longer be sanctioned. CBC reported that the CSA's decision was partially based on their inability to handle the match fixing issue. The CSA later announced that the decision was made in order to implement the James Easton Report (Rethink Management Group Report) for the adoption of a new professional soccer structure. The CSL protested the de-sanctioning and appealed to the Sport Dispute Resolution Centre of Canada (SDRCC). The sport arbitrator ruled that the CSA had the right to de-sanction the CSL, but ruled that the immediate decisions conducted by the CSA were unreasonable and coercive. The sport arbitrator forced them to reinstate sanctioning to the CSL until the next season in order for the CSA to fairly implement the Easton Report. A notable admission was made by CSA president Victor Montagliani during the SDRCC hearing, where he stated that the decision to de-sanction the CSL was not made on any alleged grounds of match fixing in the CSL but strictly on the decision made by the CSA board of directors to adopt a new soccer structure in Canada.

=== Recent years (2014–present) ===
On February 28, 2014, the CSA officially expelled the CSL from its membership, citing violations of rules and regulations. After failing to specify which rule violations were made and without providing a formal hearing the CSL in response filed litigation against the CSA. As a result, the CSL began its operation as a private league for the first time since the 1997 season in its predecessor league. They joined the newly formed Soccer Federation of Canada (SFC), which provided the private soccer entity the services of administration of players, non-playing personnel, match officials and insurance, which they no longer have any affiliation with now.

Significant changes were made at the 2015 annual general meeting of team owners where restrictions on import players were lifted, and a working relationship was formed with the American Soccer League (ASL) in order to assist in areas of competition and business. A television agreement was made with Ethnic Channels Group, and beIN Sports in order to broadcast their television program, and revived their sponsorship deal with Givova in 2016. Affiliations were formed with the Ontario Youth Soccer Association in order to establish a YSA Division to house the CSL Academy teams, and with the Canadian Corporate Soccer League in developing a structure of competition for the city's corporate clubs in Toronto. While reports of alleged match fixing continued with a report released on October 14, 2015, by the International Centre for Sport Security (ICSS) claiming that 42% of matches in the 2015 season potentially had illegal and suspicious betting activity. All 12 teams were alleged to have played in a "suspicious" game on at least three occasions. On February 2, 2016, the Royal Canadian Mounted Police (RCMP) announced investigations in the alleged match fixing in the CSL. As a result, the CSL cooperated with RCMP investigations and took measures to monitor all matches during the 2016 season.

== Competition format ==
=== League competition ===
There are currently four clubs in the Canadian Soccer League. Traditionally, during the course of a league season teams usually played a balanced schedule of 18 or 22 games from April/May through October/November with the top eight ranked teams advancing to the playoffs. As of recent seasons a balanced schedule of 10 to 14 games has been played. Each match sees the winning team awarded three points, or in the case of a draw, the teams receive one point each. No points are awarded for a loss. At the end of each season, the club with the most points is crowned the regular season champion.

The playoffs operate as a knockout tournament with single-match legs where the winner of the final is crowned CSL champion. Fourteen clubs have won the CSL Championship including Toronto Croatia (6 titles), York Region Shooters, and FC Continentals (3 titles each). There is no automatic promotion and relegation between the First and Second Division. Club members of the CSL vote to determine which, if any, applications for admission into the league will be permitted.

=== Cup competition ===
The Canadian Soccer League previously organized a knock-out cup competition known as the Open Canada Cup (formerly known as the Government of Canada Open Cup for sponsorship reasons) each league season. The competition was originally formed in 1998 known as the League Cup, and was exclusively open only to CPSL clubs. In 2003, the CPSL opened the League Cup to all Canadian professional and amateur clubs in order to provide a potential Canadian candidate to the CONCACAF Champions' Cup. The competition was renamed with the Government of Canada as the initial title sponsorship, and the inclusion of a $10,000 reward for the champion.

The Open Canada Cup eventually expanded to include professional and amateur teams from Ontario, Quebec, and British Columbia. A notable addition was the Toronto Lynx of the USL First Division at the time the nations top tier division joining the tournament in 2006. In 2008, the CSL increased the prize money to $25,000, but shortly after the creation of the Canadian Championship the competition was disbanded. Since the establishment of the Canadian Championship, no CSL teams have participated in the tournament which determines the Canadian entry into the continental competition.

== Corporate structure ==
The Canadian Soccer League is owned by its member clubs and managed by a board of directors made up of directors from each member club. The board of directors sets out the policy to oversee league operations and selects a chairman. Originally new a franchisee were given the status of a playing member, and were placed on a probation for a period of three years before they were granted shareholder status as a member club with equity ownership. In 2011, the ownership structure of the league was reformed into an incorporated body as the CSL Association Inc in order to bring about a slow process of equalization to the status of teams, while compensating the equity owners who had heavily invested in league throughout the years

The current chairman is Vincent Ursini, appointed in March 2011, and the league administrator is Pino Jazbec with Stan Adamson as Director of Media. Previously the chairman also had the function of a commissioner with Michael Di Biase, Cary Kaplan, and Domenic Di Gironimo serving in that capacity.

== Sponsorship ==
The Canadian Soccer League originally sold title sponsorship rights to Givova from 2010 to 2012. The Givova deal with the Canadian Soccer League expired after the 2012 season, and was renewed in 2016.

| Period | Sponsor | Name |
|---|---|---|
| 1998–2005 | No sponsor | Canadian Professional Soccer League |
| 2005–2009 | No sponsor | Canadian Soccer League |
| 2010–2012 | Givova | Givova Canadian Soccer League |
| 2013–2015 | No sponsor | Canadian Soccer League |
| 2016–2017 | Givova | Givova Canadian Soccer League |
| 2018– | No sponsor | Canadian Soccer League |

As well as sponsorship for the league itself, the CSL had a number of official partners and suppliers. These partners include companies involved in food and beverage, sports-wear and equipment.

== Teams ==
Thirty-nine teams have played in the Canadian Soccer League from its inception in 1998, up to and including the 2018 season.

The following four clubs contested in the CSL during the 2025 season:

| Club | Founded | First joined | Location | Stadium | Position in 2025 | Top division titles | Last title |
|---|---|---|---|---|---|---|---|
| Aeem Canada FC | 2025 | 2025 | Toronto | Esther Shiner Stadium Rob Ford Stadium | 4th | | |
| Scarborough SC | 2014 | 2015 | Toronto | Esther Shiner Stadium Rob Ford Stadium | 1st | 3 | 2025 |
| Serbian White Eagles | 1968 | 2006 | Toronto | Esther Shiner Stadium Rob Ford Stadium | 2nd | 3 | 2016 |
| Unity FC | 2024 | 2024 | Toronto | Esther Shiner Stadium Rob Ford Stadium | 3rd | | |

== Champions ==
This is a list of all Championship finals played so far. The final was called Rogers Cup from 1998 to 2009. Since 2010 it has been called the Givova Cup due to sponsorship change.

Key

| † | League champions also won the Open Canada Cup, i.e. they completed the domestic Double. |

| Season | Champions (titles) | Runners-up | Top league scorer | |
| Season | Champions (titles) | Runners-up | Player (Club) | Goals |
|---|---|---|---|---|
| 1998 (1st) | St. Catharines Wolves (1) | Toronto Olympians | Gus Kouzmanis (Toronto Olympians) | 33 |
| 1999 (2nd) | Toronto Olympians (1) † | Toronto Croatia | Eddy Berdusco (Toronto Olympians) | 25 |
| 2000 (3rd) | Toronto Croatia (1) | Toronto Olympians | Gus Kouzmanis (Toronto Olympians) | 31 |
| 2001 (4th) | St. Catharines Wolves (2) | Toronto Supra | Kevin Nelson (Ottawa Wizards) | 23 |
| 2002 (5th) | Ottawa Wizards (1) † | North York Astros | Darren Tilley (Mississauga Olympians) | 20 |
| 2003 (6th) | Brampton Hitmen (1) | Vaughan Sun Devils | Carlo Arghittu (St. Catharines Wolves) | 18 |
| 2004 (7th) | Toronto Croatia (2) | Vaughan Shooters | Paul Munster (London City) | 25 |
| 2005 (8th) | Oakville Blue Devils (1) | Vaughan Shooters | Aaron Byrd (Windsor Border Stars) | 17 |
| 2006 (9th) | Italia Shooters (1) | Serbian White Eagles | Gabriel Pop (Serbian White Eagles) | 27 |
| 2007 (10th) | Toronto Croatia (3) | Serbian White Eagles | Nicolas Lesage (Trois-Rivières Attak) | 20 |
| 2008 (11th) | Serbian White Eagles (1) | Trois-Rivières Attak | Daniel Nascimento (Brampton Lions) | 18 |
| 2009 (12th) | Trois-Rivières Attak (1) | Serbian White Eagles | Reda Agourram (Trois-Rivières Attak) | 13 |
| 2010 (13th) | Brantford Galaxy (1) | Hamilton Croatia | Tihomir Maletić (Toronto Croatia) | 17 |
| 2011 (14th) | Toronto Croatia (4) | Capital City F.C. | Stefan Vukovic (TFC Academy) | 18 |
| 2012 (15th) | Toronto Croatia (5) | Montreal Impact Academy | Dražen Vuković (SC Waterloo Region) | 20 |
| 2013 (16th) | SC Waterloo Region (1) | Kingston FC | Guillaume Surot (Kingston FC) | 28 |
| 2014 (17th) | York Region Shooters (2) | Toronto Croatia | Marin Vučemilović-Grgić (London City SC) | 20 |
| 2015 (18th) | Toronto Croatia (6) | SC Waterloo Region | Richard West (York Region Shooters) | 23 |
| 2016 (19th) | Serbian White Eagles (2) | Hamilton City | Serhiy Ivlyev (FC Ukraine United) | 15 |
| 2017 (20th) | York Region Shooters (3) | Scarborough SC | Aleksandar Stojiljković (Scarborough SC) | 17 |
| 2018 (21st) | FC Vorkuta (1) | Scarborough SC | Sani Dey (Hamilton City SC) | 13 |
| 2019 (22nd) | Scarborough SC (1) | FC Ukraine United | Mykola Temnyuk (FC Vorkuta) | 18 |
| 2020 (23rd) | FC Vorkuta (2) | Scarborough SC | Moussa Limane (Scarborough SC) | 7 |
| 2021 (24th) | Scarborough SC (2) | FC Vorkuta | Wabila Wallace (Atletico Sporting Toronto) | 7 |
| 2022 (25th) | FC Continentals (3) | Scarborough SC | Vladimir Strizovic (Serbian White Eagles) | 8 |
| 2023 (26th) (Note: Scarborough were the regular season champions as the playoffs weren't contested) | Scarborough SC | Serbian White Eagles | Serhiy Ivlyev (Dynamo Toronto) | 13 |
| 2024 (27th) (Note: Serbian White Eagles were the regular season champions as the playoffs weren't contested) | Serbian White Eagles | Scarborough SC | Nikola Timotijević (Serbian White Eagles) | 13 |
| 2025 (28th) | Scarborough SC (3) | Serbian White Eagles | Devroy Grey (Scarborough SC); Erick Hernández (Unity FC) | 8 |
| 2026 (29th) (Note: Only the playoff championship was played, as the regular season was canceled) | Scarborough SC (4) | Serbian White Eagles | | |

Notes on name changes:

- York Region Shooters were known as "Italia Shooters" in 2006 when they played in the International Division and originally were known as "Vaughan Shooters" from 2003 until 2005.
- Toronto Olympians were later called "Mississauga Olympians" after relocation in 2002.
- Vorkuta was renamed FC Continentals in 2022.

=== Performance by club ===
| Club | Champions | Runners-up | Winning years |
|---|---|---|---|
| Toronto Croatia | 6 | 2 | 2000, 2004, 2007, 2011, 2012, 2015 |
| Scarborough SC | 4 | 4 | 2019, 2021, 2025, 2026 |
| York Region Shooters | 3 | 2 | 2006, 2014, 2017 |
| FC Continentals | 3 | 1 | 2018, 2020, 2022 |
| Serbian White Eagles | 2 | 6 | 2008, 2016 |
| St. Catharines Wolves | 2 | — | 1998, 2001 |
| Toronto Olympians | 1 | 2 | 1999 |
| Trois-Rivières Attak | 1 | 1 | 2009 |
| SC Waterloo Region | 1 | 1 | 2011 |
| Ottawa Wizards | 1 | — | 2002 |
| Brampton Hitmen | 1 | — | 2003 |
| Oakville Blue Devils | 1 | — | 2005 |
| Brantford Galaxy | 1 | — | 2010 |
| Capital City F.C. | — | 1 | — |
| FC Ukraine United | — | 1 | — |
| Hamilton City SC | — | 1 | — |
| Hamilton Croatia | — | 1 | — |
| Kingston FC | — | 1 | — |
| Montreal Impact Academy | — | 1 | — |
| North York Astros | — | 1 | — |
| Toronto Supra | — | 1 | — |
| Vaughan Sun Devils | — | 1 | — |

== Head coaches ==
Since the inception of the Canadian Soccer League, it has contributed to the development and supply of head coaches to the Canadian soccer system. The league, as it did in its predecessor league, managed to attract many prominent head coaches from abroad to provide the experience needed in the development of coaching. Notable head coaches have included Rudolf Belin, Miroslav Buljan, Manuel Gomes, Rasim Kara, Ivan Markovic, Mladen Pralija, Dragoslav Šekularac, and Ihor Yavorskyi. While at the same time providing the opportunities to produce and develop head coaches as Bijan Azizi, Jason Bent, Jim Brennan, Nikola Budalic, Hubert Busby Jr., Rafael Carbajal, Danny Dichio, Marc Dos Santos, Philippe Eullaffroy, Dejan Gluščević, Carmine Isacco, Goran Miscevic, Darren Tilley, and Duncan Wilde, who have gone on to higher endeavors.

The league's longest-serving head coach is Uroš Stamatović, who has been in charge of Serbian White Eagles originally in 2012 and returned in 2019. There have been 19 head coaches who have won the CSL Championship. In addition, 15 foreign head coaches have secured the CSL championship, with 4 Canadians winning the title.

Winning head coaches
| Head Coach | Club(s) | Wins | Winning years |
|---|---|---|---|
| (Croatia) Velimir Crljen | Toronto Croatia | 4 | 2000, 2011, 2012, 2015 |
| (Canada) Tony De Thomasis | York Region Shooters | 2 | 2006, 2017 |
| (Croatia) Lazo Džepina | Brantford Galaxy; SC Waterloo Region | 2 | 2010, 2013 |
| (Serbia) Mirko Medić | Serbian White Eagles; Scarborough SC | 2 | 2016, 2021 |
| (Serbia) Milan Čančarević | Serbian White Eagles | 1 | 2008 |
| (Bulgaria) Kiril Dimitrov | Scarborough SC | 1 | 2025 |
| (France) Philippe Eullaffroy | Trois-Rivières Attak | 1 | 2009 |
| (England) David Gee | Toronto Olympians | 1 | 1999 |
| (Saint Kitts and Nevis) Darryl Gomez | York Region Shooters | 1 | 2014 |
| (Canada) Lucio Ianiero | St. Catharines Wolves | 1 | 2001 |
| (Uzbekistan) Samad Kadirov | FC Vorkuta | 1 | 2018 |
| (Croatia) Aldo Krajcar | Toronto Croatia | 1 | 2004 |
| (Germany) Klaus Linnenbruegger | Ottawa Wizards | 1 | 2002 |
| (Russia) Andrei Malychenkov | FC Continentals | 1 | 2022 |
| (Canada) Steve Nijjar | Brampton Hitmen | 1 | 2003 |
| (Canada) Dino Perri | St. Catharines Wolves | 1 | 1998 |
| (Serbia) Zoran Rajović | Scarborough SC | 1 | 2019 |
| (England) Duncan Wilde | Oakville Blue Devils | 1 | 2005 |
| (Ukraine) Denys Yanchuk | FC Vorkuta | 1 | 2020 |

== CPSL/CSL regular season records by clubs ==
=== First division ===
| (Pts) # | Club | Seasons | GP | W | D | L | F | A | GD | Pts | PPG | (PPG) # | 1st | 2nd |
|---|---|---|---|---|---|---|---|---|---|---|---|---|---|---|
| 1 | York Region Shooters | 20 (1998–) | 396 | 205 | 88 | 101 | 772 | 493 | +279 | 705 | 1.78 | 8 | 4 | 2 |
| 2 | Toronto Croatia | 18 (1998–2015) | 361 | 194 | 84 | 83 | 738 | 445 | +293 | 666 | 1.84 | 4 | 2 | 6 |
| 3 | Serbian White Eagles | 12 (2006–) | 253 | 137 | 54 | 62 | 511 | 278 | +233 | 465 | 1.84 | 5 | 3 | 3 |
| 4 | Brampton United | 14 (2002–2015) | 297 | 125 | 64 | 108 | 559 | 449 | +110 | 439 | 1.47 | 15 | | 1 |
| 5 | SC Toronto | 12 (2001–2012) | 257 | 117 | 66 | 74 | 516 | 363 | +153 | 417 | 1.62 | 12 | 2 | |
| 6 | St. Catharines Wolves | 16 (1998–2013) | 321 | 107 | 68 | 146 | 426 | 611 | −185 | 389 | 1.21 | 23 | | 3 |
| 7 | North York Astros | 17 (2006–2014) | 338 | 80 | 64 | 194 | 444 | 772 | −328 | 304 | 0.90 | 28 | | |
| 8 | London City SC | 19 (1998–2016) | 361 | 77 | 68 | 206 | 476 | 944 | −468 | 293 | 0.81 | 31 | | |
| 9 | Trois-Rivières Attak | 8 (2001–03), (2005–2009) | 165 | 86 | 34 | 45 | 331 | 217 | +114 | 292 | 1.77 | 9 | 2 | 1 |
| 10 | Durham Storm | 8 (1998–05) | 143 | 69 | 15 | 59 | 319 | 266 | +53 | 222 | 1.55 | 14 | 3 | 1 |
| 11 | Windsor Stars | 8 (2004–08, 2011–2013) | 178 | 60 | 34 | 84 | 283 | 319 | −36 | 214 | 1.20 | 24 | | |
| 12 | Brampton Stallions | 6 (2001–06) | 123 | 43 | 31 | 49 | 191 | 205 | −14 | 160 | 1.30 | 21 | | |
| 13 | Brantford Galaxy SC | 6 (2010–2012, 2015–) | 129 | 42 | 21 | 65 | 199 | 290 | −91 | 147 | 1.14 | 26 | | |
| 14 | TFC Academy | 5 (2008–2012) | 111 | 40 | 23 | 48 | 180 | 176 | +4 | 143 | 1.29 | 22 | | |
| 15 | Ottawa Wizards | 3 (2001–03) | 59 | 44 | 10 | 5 | 159 | 39 | +120 | 142 | 2.41 | 1 | 3 | |
| 16 | Hamilton Thunder | 4 (2002–05) | 79 | 38 | 22 | 19 | 147 | 88 | +59 | 136 | 1.72 | 10 | | 1 |
| 17 | SC Waterloo Region | 5 (2012–2015, 2017–) | 97 | 39 | 17 | 41 | 184 | 172 | +12 | 134 | 1.38 | 19 | | |
| 18 | Montreal Impact Academy | 3 (2010–2012) | 72 | 34 | 17 | 21 | 143 | 91 | +52 | 119 | 1.65 | 11 | | 1 |
| 19 | Kingston FC | 3 (2012–2014) | 62 | 28 | 7 | 27 | 139 | 129 | +10 | 91 | 1.47 | 16 | 1 | |
| 20 | Scarborough SC | 3 (2015–) | 57 | 22 | 15 | 20 | 105 | 97 | +8 | 81 | 1.42 | 18 | | |
| 21 | Mississauga Eagles FC | 3 (1998, 2011–2012) | 62 | 24 | 9 | 29 | 115 | 117 | −2 | 81 | 1.31 | 20 | | |
| 22 | Durham Flames | 5 (1999–03) | 87 | 20 | 14 | 53 | 136 | 231 | −95 | 74 | 0.85 | 30 | | |
| 23 | Burlington SC | 3 (2013–2015) | 62 | 22 | 6 | 34 | 98 | 137 | −39 | 72 | 1.16 | 25 | | |
| 24 | Niagara United | 4 (2012–2015) | 83 | 18 | 12 | 53 | 107 | 210 | −103 | 66 | 0.80 | 32 | | |
| 25 | Toronto Atomic FC | 2 (2015–2016) | 43 | 18 | 8 | 17 | 59 | 74 | −15 | 62 | 1.44 | 17 | | |
| 26 | Capital City F.C. | 1 (2011) | 26 | 15 | 7 | 4 | 52 | 22 | +30 | 52 | 2.00 | 3 | | |
| 27 | Milton SC | 3 (2015–) | 57 | 14 | 9 | 34 | 81 | 168 | −87 | 51 | 0.89 | 29 | | |
| 28 | Hamilton Croatia | 1 (2010) | 24 | 13 | 5 | 6 | 51 | 27 | +24 | 44 | 1.83 | 6 | | |
| 29 | Milltown FC | 1 (2010) | 24 | 12 | 7 | 5 | 43 | 22 | +21 | 43 | 1.79 | 7 | | |
| 30 | FC Ukraine United | 1 (2016) | 21 | 9 | 6 | 6 | 45 | 38 | +7 | 33 | 1.57 | 13 | | 1 |
| 31 | FC Vorkuta | 1 (2017–) | 14 | 10 | 2 | 2 | 43 | 13 | +30 | 32 | 2.28 | 2 | 1 | |
| 32 | CSC Mississauga | 2 (2018–2019) | 34 | 7 | 3 | 24 | 47 | 75 | −28 | 24 | 0.71 | 33 | | |
| 33 | Hamilton City SC | 1 (2016) | 21 | 6 | 5 | 10 | 31 | 38 | −7 | 23 | 1.09 | 27 | | |
| 34 | SC Real Mississauga | 2 (2018–2019) | 34 | 6 | 4 | 24 | 34 | 104 | −70 | 22 | 0.65 | 34 | | |
| 35 | Royal Toronto FC | 1 (2017–) | 14 | 1 | 3 | 10 | 20 | 45 | −25 | 6 | 0.43 | 35 | | |
| 36 | Caribbean Selects | 1 (2006) | 22 | 1 | 3 | 18 | 15 | 87 | −72 | 6 | 0.18 | 36 | | |

=== Second division ===
| (Pts) # | Club | Seasons | GP | W | D | L | F | A | GD | Pts | PPG | (PPG) # | 1st | 2nd |
|---|---|---|---|---|---|---|---|---|---|---|---|---|---|---|
| 1 | York Region Shooters B | 7 (2008–2013), (2015–2016) | 115 | 57 | 20 | 38 | 261 | 197 | +64 | 191 | 1.66 | 9 | 1 | 1 |
| 2 | Brampton City United B | 7 (2009–2015) | 112 | 55 | 15 | 42 | 237 | 172 | +65 | 175 | 1.56 | 16 | 1 | 1 |
| 3 | TFC Academy II | 5 (2008–2012) | 78 | 53 | 9 | 17 | 227 | 79 | +148 | 165 | 2.12 | 4 | 2 | |
| 4 | Brantford Galaxy B | 6 (2010–2012), (2015–) | 95 | 44 | 7 | 44 | 192 | 204 | −12 | 139 | 1.46 | 18 | | 1 |
| 5 | SC Waterloo Region B | 5 (2012–2015), (2017–) | 80 | 36 | 28 | 26 | 188 | 142 | +46 | 126 | 1.58 | 14 | 1 | |
| 6 | Serbian White Eagles B | 8 (2010–) | 127 | 34 | 13 | 78 | 190 | 445 | −255 | 115 | 0.90 | 32 | | |
| 7 | SC Toronto B | 5 (2008–2012) | 77 | 32 | 11 | 34 | 206 | 177 | +29 | 107 | 1.40 | 21 | 1 | |
| 8 | Niagara United B | 4 (2012–2015) | 66 | 30 | 14 | 22 | 158 | 126 | +32 | 104 | 1.58 | 15 | | 1 |
| 9 | Toronto Croatia B | 5 (2008), (2011) (2013–2015) | 84 | 26 | 16 | 42 | 148 | 202 | −54 | 94 | 1.12 | 27 | 1 | 1 |
| 10 | St. Catharines Wolves B | 4 (2010–13) | 66 | 19 | 8 | 37 | 97 | 147 | −50 | 65 | 0.98 | 29 | | |
| 11 | Kingston FC B | 3 (2012–2014) | 48 | 18 | 6 | 24 | 113 | 128 | −15 | 60 | 1.25 | 25 | 1 | |
| 12 | North York Astros B | 4 (2008–2011) | 60 | 17 | 8 | 35 | 77 | 147 | −70 | 59 | 0.98 | 30 | | |
| 13 | SC Waterloo Region | 2 (2011), (2016) | 33 | 15 | 9 | 9 | 88 | 59 | +29 | 54 | 1.64 | 10 | 1 | |
| 14 | Burlington SC B | 2 (2014–2015) | 34 | 16 | 6 | 12 | 62 | 77 | −15 | 54 | 1.59 | 13 | | |
| 15 | Toronto Atomic FC B | 2 (2015–2016) | 33 | 16 | 5 | 12 | 98 | 67 | +31 | 53 | 1.60 | 12 | | 1 |
| 16 | Mississauga Eagles FC B | 2 (2011–2012) | 34 | 15 | 8 | 11 | 79 | 77 | +2 | 53 | 1.56 | 17 | | |
| 17 | London City SC B | 2 (2011), (2013) | 34 | 15 | 4 | 15 | 74 | 80 | −6 | 49 | 1.44 | 19 | | |
| 18 | FC Ukraine United | 1 (2017–) | 14 | 13 | 1 | 0 | 75 | 10 | +65 | 40 | 2.86 | 1 | 1 | |
| 19 | Windsor Stars B | 1 (2012) | 16 | 11 | 2 | 3 | 53 | 23 | +30 | 35 | 2.19 | 3 | | 1 |
| 20 | Niagara United | 1 (2011) | 18 | 9 | 6 | 3 | 45 | 19 | +26 | 33 | 1.83 | 6 | | |
| 21 | Milton SC B | 1 (2015) | 18 | 9 | 5 | 4 | 44 | 18 | +26 | 31 | 1.72 | 7 | | |
| 22 | Burlington SC | 1 (2017–) | 14 | 10 | 1 | 3 | 44 | 18 | +26 | 31 | 2.21 | 2 | | 1 |
| 23 | Winstars Shooters | 1 (2014) | 16 | 7 | 5 | 4 | 42 | 27 | +15 | 26 | 1.63 | 11 | | |
| 24 | Elite Italia FC | 1 (2009) | 12 | 8 | 1 | 3 | 37 | 19 | +18 | 25 | 2.08 | 5 | | 1 |
| 25 | FC Vorkuta B | 1 (2017–) | 14 | 8 | 0 | 6 | 41 | 25 | +16 | 24 | 1.71 | 8 | | |
| 26 | Milton SC | 1 (2014) | 16 | 6 | 4 | 6 | 37 | 33 | +4 | 22 | 1.38 | 22 | | |
| 27 | Ottawa FC | 1 (2010) | 15 | 6 | 2 | 7 | 11 | 29 | −18 | 20 | 1.33 | 23 | | |
| 28 | Milltown FC B | 1 (2010) | 15 | 5 | 4 | 6 | 18 | 28 | −10 | 19 | 1.26 | 24 | | |
| 29 | Woodbridge Italia FC | 1 (2009) | 12 | 5 | 2 | 5 | 34 | 32 | +2 | 17 | 1.42 | 20 | | |
| 30 | Unionville Italia FC | 1 (2009) | 12 | 4 | 3 | 5 | 13 | 19 | −6 | 15 | 1.25 | 26 | | |
| 31 | Royal Toronto FC B | 1 (2017-) | 14 | 5 | 0 | 9 | 32 | 58 | −26 | 15 | 1.07 | 28 | | |
| 32 | Hamilton Croatia B | 1 (2010) | 15 | 4 | 2 | 9 | 22 | 38 | −16 | 14 | 0.93 | 31 | | |
| 33 | London City SC | 2 (2016–) | 27 | 4 | 1 | 22 | 42 | 91 | −49 | 13 | 0.48 | 33 | | |
| 34 | Kingston Prospect FC | 1 (2011) | 19 | 3 | 0 | 16 | 19 | 82 | −63 | 9 | 0.47 | 34 | | |

== CPSL/CSL playoff records by clubs ==
| (Pts) # | Club | Playoffs reached vs seasons played | GP | W | D | L | F | A | GD | Pts | PPG | Rank (by champions, runners-up, PPG) | 1st | 2nd |
|---|---|---|---|---|---|---|---|---|---|---|---|---|---|---|
| 1 | Toronto Croatia | 14/16 | 36 | 24 | 4 | 8 | 75 | 33 | +42 | 76 | 2,111 | 1 | 5 | 1 |
| 2 | York Region Shooters | 13/16 | 30 | 14 | 4 | 12 | 50 | 48 | +2 | 46 | 1,533 | 3 | 1 | 3 |
| 3 | Serbian White Eagles | 8/8 | 24 | 11 | 2 | 8 | 38 | 33 | +5 | 35 | 1,458 | 4 | 1 | 3 |
| 4 | Durham Storm | 5/9 | 11 | 7 | 1 | 3 | 27 | 16 | +11 | 22 | 2,000 | 5 | 1 | 2 |
| 5 | Trois-Rivières Attak | 7/8 | 13 | 7 | 1 | 5 | 27 | 17 | +10 | 22 | 1,692 | 6 | 1 | 1 |
| 6 | St. Catharines Wolves | 6/16 | 12 | 4 | 2 | 6 | 15 | 20 | −5 | 14 | 1,167 | 2 | 2 | |
| 7 | Brampton United | 9/12 | 14 | 4 | 2 | 8 | 15 | 29 | −14 | 14 | 1,000 | 11 | 1 | |
| 8 | SC Toronto | 9/12 | 15 | 4 | 1 | 10 | 19 | 38 | −19 | 13 | 0,867 | 16 | | 1 |
| 9 | Brantford Galaxy SC | 1/3 | 4 | 3 | 1 | 0 | 9 | 3 | +6 | 10 | 2,500 | 7 | 1 | |
| 10 | Hamilton Croatia | 1/1 | 4 | 3 | 0 | 1 | 5 | 4 | +1 | 9 | 2,250 | 12 | | 1 |
| 11 | SC Waterloo Region | 1/2 | 3 | 2 | 1 | 0 | 8 | 2 | +6 | 7 | 2,333 | 8 | 1 | |
| 12 | Capital City F.C. | 1/1 | 4 | 2 | 1 | 1 | 8 | 3 | +5 | 7 | 1,750 | 14 | | 1 |
| 13 | Brampton Stallions | 3/6 | 5 | 2 | 1 | 2 | 5 | 7 | −2 | 7 | 1,400 | 10 | 1 | |
| 14 | Montreal Impact Academy | 2/3 | 5 | 2 | 1 | 2 | 7 | 5 | +2 | 7 | 1,400 | 15 | | 1 |
| 15 | Kingston FC | 1/1 | 3 | 2 | 0 | 1 | 7 | 6 | +1 | 6 | 2,000 | 13 | | 1 |
| 16 | Ottawa Wizards | 3/3 | 4 | 2 | 0 | 2 | 5 | 6 | −1 | 6 | 1,500 | 9 | 1 | |
| 17 | Astros Vasas FC | 5/16 | 8 | 2 | 0 | 6 | 8 | 16 | −8 | 6 | 0,750 | 17 | | 1 |
| 18 | London City | 3/16 | 5 | 0 | 3 | 2 | 6 | 10 | −4 | 3 | 0,600 | 18 | | |
| 19 | Windsor Stars | 6/8 | 7 | 1 | 0 | 6 | 6 | 20 | −14 | 3 | 0,429 | 20 | | |
| 20 | Milltown FC | 1/1 | 2 | 0 | 1 | 1 | 2 | 3 | −1 | 1 | 0,500 | 19 | | |
| 21 | Niagara United | 1/2 | 1 | 0 | 0 | 1 | 0 | 1 | −1 | 0 | 0,000 | 21 | | |
| 22 | Hamilton Thunder | 4/4 | 4 | 0 | 0 | 4 | 2 | 7 | −5 | 0 | 0,000 | 22 | | |
| 23 | Mississauga Eagles FC | 1/3 | 2 | 0 | 0 | 2 | 1 | 8 | −7 | 0 | 0,000 | 23 | | |
| 24 | TFC Academy | 3/5 | 5 | 0 | 0 | 5 | 2 | 10 | −8 | 0 | 0,000 | 24 | | |

== Selected seasons overview (2001–present) ==
| Rank | Club | Year | GP | W | D | L | Pts | PPG | Playoff result |
|---|---|---|---|---|---|---|---|---|---|
| 1 | Serbian White Eagles | 2006 | 22 | 17 | 4 | 1 | 55 | 2.50 | Lost final |
| 2 | Ottawa Wizards | 2002 | 19 | 15 | 2 | 2 | 47 | 2.47 | Won Championship |
| 3 | Ottawa Wizards | 2003 | 18 | 13 | 5 | 0 | 44 | 2.44 | Lost semi-final |
| 4 | SC Toronto | 2011 | 26 | 20 | 3 | 3 | 63 | 2.42 | Lost quarter-final |
| 5 | Toronto Croatia | 2012 | 22 | 15 | 6 | 1 | 51 | 2.32 | Won Championship |
| 5 | Vaughan Shooters | 2005 | 22 | 16 | 3 | 3 | 51 | 2.32 | Lost final |
| 5 | Ottawa Wizards | 2001 | 22 | 16 | 3 | 3 | 51 | 2.32 | Lost semi-final |
| 8 | Toronto Supra | 2004 | 20 | 14 | 4 | 2 | 46 | 2.30 | Lost semi-final |
| 9 | Toronto Croatia | 2011 | 26 | 18 | 5 | 3 | 59 | 2.27 | Won Championship |
| 9 | Kingston FC | 2013 | 22 | 16 | 2 | 4 | 50 | 2.27 | Lost final |

== See also ==
- Canadian Premier League
- North American Soccer League
- United Soccer League
- USL Premier Development League
- Canadian soccer league system
