= 2017 FC Ukraine United season =

FC Ukraine United
2017 season
- Owner: Vladimir Koval
- Head Coach: Andrei Malychenkov
- CSL: Champions
- Top goalscorer: Taras Hromyak (15 goals)
Home colours	Away colours

The 2017 FC Ukraine United season was the second season in the club's participation in the Canadian Soccer League. They began the season at home against FC Vorkuta B. They achieved their first CSL double after defeating Burlington SC in the finals, and became the second club in the Second Division after TFC Academy II in 2012 to go undefeated the entire regular season.

== Summary ==
After a successful debut season in the CSL the organization decided to relegate themselves to the CSL Second Division for the 2017 season. Andrei Malychenkov continued in his capacity as head coach, and brought further seasoned imports from Ukraine. Throughout the season the club achieved a club milestone by producing their first perfect season in the league. As well as generating the best offensive and defensive record. In the first round of the postseason they defeated Brantford Galaxy B, and claimed the Second Division Championship after defeating Burlington SC.

== Players ==
=== Roster ===
As of June 29, 2017

Note: Flags indicate national team as defined under FIFA eligibility rules; some limited exceptions apply. Players may hold more than one non-FIFA nationality.

No.	Pos.	Nation	Player
1	GK	UKR	Nazar Lytvyn
2	DF	UKR	Oleksandr Tarasenko
3	DF	UKR	Ivan Kucherenko
4	DF	UKR	Maksym Rohovskyi
5	DF	UKR	Mykhailo Hurka
6	MF	UKR	Taras Hromyak
7	MF	UKR	Yuriy Sokolovsky
8	MF	UKR	Sergiy Sergeyev
9	MF	UKR	Andriy Kondzyolka
10	FW	UKR	Pavlo Lukyanets
11	FW	UKR	Roman Pitsur
12	DF	UKR	Ihor Kozovyk
13	FW	UKR	Kyrylo Antonenko

No.	Pos.	Nation	Player
14	FW	UKR	Ihor Shyshka
15	MF	UKR	Andriy Savchenko
17	GK	UKR	Nazariy Lazarsky
18	FW	UKR	Vladimir Koval
-	GK	UKR	Oleksandr Popravka
-	DF	UKR	Lubomir Ivansky
-	DF	UKR	Mykola Hreshta
-	MF	UKR	Sergey Semenov
-	MF	UKR	Volodymyr Romaniv
-	MF	UKR	Vasyl Chornyi
-	MF	ISR	Alon Badat
-	FW	UKR	Yevhen Falkovskyi

=== Management ===
Position	Staff
Head coach	Andrei Malychenkov
Assistant coach	Mykhailo Hurka
Assistant coach	Oleksandr Sobkovych
Goalkeeper coach	Arthur Zaslavski
Manager	Vladimir Koval

Last updated: December 5, 2017
Source: fcukraineunited.com

== Competitions ==
=== Canadian Soccer League ===
==== League table ====
===== Second Division =====
Pos	Team	Pld	W	D	L	GF	GA	GD	Pts	Qualification
1	FC Ukraine United (C, O)	14	13	1	0	75	10	+65	40	Playoffs
2	Burlington SC	14	10	1	3	44	18	+26	31	Playoffs
3	FC Vorkuta B	14	8	0	6	41	25	+16	24	Playoffs
4	Brantford Galaxy B	14	7	1	6	29	35	−6	22	Playoffs
5	Serbian White Eagles B	14	6	0	8	32	59	−27	18	Playoffs
6	SC Waterloo B	14	5	1	8	26	39	−13	16	Playoffs
7	Royal Toronto B	14	5	0	9	32	58	−26	15	Playoffs
8	London City SC	14	0	0	14	11	46	−35	0	

Updated to match(es) played on September 7, 2017. Source: canadiansoccerleague.ca
Rules for classification: 1) points; 2) goal difference; 3) number of goals scored.
(C) Champions; (O) Play-off winners

==== Results summary ====
Overall								Home						Away					
Pld	W	D	L	GF	GA	GD	Pts	W	D	L	GF	GA	GD	W	D	L	GF	GA	GD
14	13	1	0	75	10	+65	40	6	1	0	35	3	+32	7	0	0	40	7	+33

Last updated: September 10, 2017.
Source: CSL

==== Results by round ====
Round	1	2	3	4	5	6	7	8	9	10	11	12	13	14
Ground	H	A	H	H	A	A	H	A	A	H	A	A	H	H
Result	W	W	W	W	W	W	D	W	W	W	W	W	W	W

Updated to match(es) played on September 10, 2017. Source: CSL
A = Away; H = Home; W = Win; D = Draw; L = Loss

==== Matches ====
May 28	FC Ukraine United	3–1	FC Vorkuta B	Toronto, Ontario
	Lukyanets 23'; Hromyak 71'; Pitsur 90'	Report		Stadium: Centennial Park Stadium

June 3	Burlington SC	2–5	FC Ukraine United	Burlington, Ontario
		Report	Lukyanets 3', 10', 45'; Hromyak 15', 47'	Stadium: Norton Stadium

June 11	FC Ukraine United	10–0	Brantford Galaxy B	Toronto, Ontario
	Sobkovych; Lukyanets, Sokolovsky; Hromyak; Pitsur; Antonenko,, Savchenko	Report		Stadium: Centennial Park Stadium

June 18	FC Ukraine United	12–0	Serbian White Eagles B	Toronto, Ontario
	Chornyi; Lukyanets, Tarasenko; Hromyak,,, Kucherenko; Antonenko, Koval	Report		Stadium: Centennial Park Stadium

July 8	Royal Toronto FC B	2–12	FC Ukraine United	Toronto, Ontario
		Report	Chornyi; Lukyanets,,, Tarasenko; Hromyak,,,, Antonenko	Stadium: LCI Sports Centre Arena

July 16	FC Vorkuta B	1–4	FC Ukraine United	Thornhill, Ontario
	Yarmosh 44'	Report	Hromyak 25', 37', 78'; Chornyi 76'	Stadium: St. Robert Stadium

June 23	FC Ukraine United	0–0	Burlington SC	Toronto, Ontario
		Report		Stadium: Centennial Park Stadium

July 29	Brantford Galaxy B	1–5	FC Ukraine United	Brantford, Ontario
		Report	Hromyak 25', 45', 50'; Amir Hosic 29'; Antonenko	Stadium: Serbian Community Centre

August 4	Serbian White Eagles B	1–6	FC Ukraine United	Toronto, Ontario
		Report	Hromyak,,,, Chornyi	Stadium: Centennial Park Stadium

August 13	FC Ukraine United	3–0	London City SC	Toronto, Ontario
				Stadium: Centennial Park Stadium

August 16	London City SC	0–3	FC Ukraine United	London, Ontario
				Stadium: Hellenic Stadium

August 23	SC Waterloo B	0–5	FC Ukraine United	Waterloo, Ontario
		Report	Sergeyev,,, Amir Hosic	Stadium: Woodside Park

August 27	FC Ukraine United	4–2	Royal Toronto FC B	Toronto, Ontario
	Hromyak; Nazariy Lazarsky; Lukyanets; Pitsur	Report		Stadium: Centennial Park Stadium

September 1	FC Ukraine United	3–0	SC Waterloo B	Toronto, Ontario
		Report		Stadium: Centennial Park Stadium

== Statistics ==
=== Goals ===
Correct as of November 10, 2017

Second Division Goals
Pos.	Playing Pos.	Nation	Name	Appearances	Goals
1	MF	(Ukraine)	Taras Hromyak	11	15
2	FW	(Ukraine)	Pavlo Lukyanets	10	6
3	FW	(Ukraine)	Kiril Antonenko	11	4
4	MF	(Canada)	Amir Hosic	4	3
4	MF	(Ukraine)	Sergiy Sergeyev	11	3
6	FW	(Ukraine)	Vasyl Chornyi	8	2
6	FW	(Ukraine)	Roman Pitsur	9	2
8	FW	(Ukraine)	Igor Bortnyk	7	1
8	DF	(Ukraine)	Oleksander Sobkovych	4	1
8	MF	(Ukraine)	Yuri Sokolovsky	11	1
Total				86	44
