= 1997–98 Ukrainian Second League =

Ukrainian Second League
- Season: 1996–97
- Champions: (A) - Podillya Khmelnytskyi (B) - Krystal Kherson (C) - Shakhtar-2 Donetsk
- Longest winning run: 15 – Krystal (Round 1–16) =

The 1997–98 Ukrainian Second League was the seventh season of 3rd level professional football in Ukraine. The competition commenced on 31 July 1997 and ended on 29 June 1998.

== Group A ==
=== Promoted teams ===
- Tsementnyk-Khorda Mykolaiv - Runner-up of the Amateur League (debut)
- Naftovyk Dolyna - Third of the Amateur League (debut)
- Dynamo-3 Kyiv - Group 3 third of the Amateur League (debut)
- Berkut Bedevlia - Group 1 last of the Amateur League (debut)
- Borysfen Boryspil - undetermined (previously another team FC Boryspil played at the level in 1993–94)
- Karpaty-2 Lviv - undetermined (debut)

=== Relegated teams ===
- Podillia Khmelnytskyi - Placed 22nd in the First League (returning, last time in 1989 (Soviet Union))
- Veres Rivne - Placed 23rd in the First League (returning, last time in 1989 (Soviet Union))
- Krystal Chortkiv - Placed 24th in the First League (debut)

=== Location map ===
Locations of team home grounds in Ukrainian Second League 1992-93

=== Final standings ===
Pos	Team	Pld	W	D	L	GF	GA	GD	Pts	Promotion or relegation
1	Podillya Khmelnytskyi (C, O, P)	34	25	3	6	69	20	+49	78	Play-off
2	Dynamo-3 Kyiv	34	21	7	6	59	24	+35	70	
3	Karpaty-2 Lviv	34	16	5	13	54	50	+4	53	
4	Veres Rivne	34	14	10	10	42	33	+9	52	
5	Krystal Chortkiv	34	13	12	9	48	38	+10	51	
6	Tsementnyk-Khorda Mykolaiv	34	15	6	13	34	34	0	51	
7	Halychyna Drohobych	34	14	8	12	37	31	+6	50	
8	Karpaty Mukacheve (D)	34	13	10	11	36	30	+6	49	Withdrew
9	Systema-Boreks Borodianka	34	12	13	9	34	23	+11	49	
10	Naftovyk Dolyna	34	14	6	14	35	35	0	48	
11	Hazovyk Komarno	34	11	8	15	30	28	+2	41	
12	Papirnyk Malyn	34	10	11	13	29	34	−5	41	
13	Berkut Bedevlia (D)	34	12	4	18	26	53	−27	40	Withdrew
14	Borysfen Boryspil	34	11	7	16	38	48	−10	40	
15	Kalush	34	11	5	18	32	42	−10	38	
16	Haray Zhovkva	34	9	11	14	29	43	−14	38	
17	Tysmenytsia (O, D)	34	11	5	18	35	49	−14	38	Relegation play-off - Withdrew
18	Pokuttia Kolomyia (R)	34	6	5	23	19	61	−42	23	Relegated

(C) Champions; (D) Disqualified; (O) Play-off winners; (P) Promoted; (R) Relegated

=== Top goalscorers ===
	Scorer	Team	Goals (Pen.)
1	Yuriy Bakhovskyi	Veres Rivne	16
2	Pavlo Onysko	Karpaty-2 Lviv	14 (1)
2	Viktor Danylychyn	Krystal Chortkiv	14 (3)
4	Vasyl Bondarchuk	Podillya Khmelnytskyi	12
4	Volodymyr Ivakhnyuk	FC Kalush	12 (1)

== Group B ==
=== Promoted teams ===
- Chornomorets Sevastopol - Fourth of the Amateur League (returning, last time as Chayka Sevastopol in 1995–96)
- Dynamo Odesa - undetermined (returning, last time as Dynamo-Flesh in 1995–96)
- SKA-Lotto Odesa - winner of the Odesa Oblast championship as Lotto Odesa (debut)
- Fortuna Sharhorod - winner of the Vinnytsia Oblast championship (debut)
- Dnipro-2 Dnipropetrovsk - undetermined (debut)
- Zirka-NIBAS-2 Kirovohrad - undetermined (debut)

=== Relegated teams ===
- SC Odesa - Placed 21st in the First League (returning, last time as SKA Odesa in 1991 (Soviet Union))

=== Location map ===
Locations of team home grounds in Ukrainian Second League 1992-93

=== Final standings ===
Pos	Team	Pld	W	D	L	GF	GA	GD	Pts	Promotion or relegation
1	Krystal Kherson (C)	32	28	2	2	74	20	+54	86	Play-off
2	SKA-Lotto Odesa (D)	32	21	4	7	54	23	+31	67	Merged with Dynamo Odesa
3	SC Odesa	32	18	7	7	48	29	+19	61	
4	Hirnyk-Sport Komsomolsk	32	12	11	9	39	35	+4	47	
5	Olimpia Pivdenoukrainsk	32	13	6	13	33	41	−8	45	
6	Viktor Zaporizhzhia	32	12	7	13	41	38	+3	43	
7	Dnipro-2 Dnipropetrovsk	32	11	10	11	41	40	+1	43	
8	Tytan Armyansk	32	11	9	12	36	36	0	42	
9	Chornomorets Sevastopol	32	10	11	11	32	33	−1	41	
10	Portovyk Illichivsk	32	10	10	12	36	45	−9	40	
11	Lokomotyv Smila	32	10	9	13	34	40	−6	39	
12	Fortuna Sharhorod	32	11	5	16	37	53	−16	38	
13	Nyva Bershad	32	9	8	15	39	46	−7	35	
14	Torpedo Melitopol	32	7	12	13	38	43	−5	33	
15	Ryhonda Bila Tserkva	32	7	10	15	25	45	−20	31	
16	Zirka-2 Kirovohrad	32	7	8	17	21	47	−26	29	
17	Dynamo Odesa	32	7	7	18	26	40	−14	28	Merged with SKA-Lotto Odesa

(C) Champions; (D) Disqualified

== Group C ==
=== Promoted teams ===
- Elektron Romny - Winner of the Amateur League (debut)
- Metalurh Komsomolske - Fifth of the Amateur League (debut)
- Pivdenstal Yenakieve - Sixth of the Amateur League (debut)
- Slovianets Konotop - Group 3 runner-up of the Amateur League (debut)
- Avers Bakhmach - Group 5 runner-up of the Amateur League (debut)
- Vorskla-2 Poltava - undetermined (debut)
- Hirnyk Pavlohrad - undetermined (returning, last time as Hirnyk-Kosmos Pavlohrad in 1995–96)
- Metalurh-2 Donetsk - undetermined (debut)

=== Location map ===
Locations of team home grounds in Ukrainian Second League 1992-93

=== Final standings ===
Pos	Team	Pld	W	D	L	GF	GA	GD	Pts	Promotion or relegation
1	Shakhtar-2 Donetsk (C, P)	30	22	4	4	87	26	+61	70	Play-off
2	Fakel Varva (D)	30	18	6	6	48	23	+25	60	Withdrew
3	Elektron Romny	30	17	7	6	53	36	+17	58	
4	Oskil Kupiansk	30	16	5	9	35	28	+7	53	
5	Obolon-PPO Kyiv	30	15	7	8	47	28	+19	52	
6	Metalurh Novomoskovsk	30	16	3	11	49	39	+10	51	
7	Slovyanets Konotop (D)	30	11	12	7	27	27	0	45	Withdrew
8	Slavutych-ChAES (D)	30	12	6	12	39	38	+1	42	Withdrew
9	Vorskla-2 Poltava	30	11	7	12	52	47	+5	40	
10	Metalurh-2 Donetsk (D)	30	10	6	14	38	42	−4	36	Withdrew
11	Shakhtar Stakhanov	30	9	6	15	21	45	−24	33	
12	Pivdenstal Yenakiyeve (D)	30	7	10	13	27	34	−7	31	Withdrew
13	Metalist-2 Kharkiv	30	8	4	18	39	52	−13	28	
14	Myrhorod	30	7	5	18	34	64	−30	26	
15	Hirnyk Pavlohrad (R)	30	6	6	18	30	58	−28	24	Play-off – Relegated
16	Metalurh Komsomolske (R)	30	7	2	21	24	63	−39	23	Relegated
17	Avers Bakhmach (D)	0	0	0	0	0	0	0	0	Withdrew

(C) Champions; (D) Disqualified; (P) Promoted; (R) Relegated

== Post season play-offs ==
=== Relegation play-offs ===
Team 1	Agg.	Team 2	1st leg	2nd leg
FC Tysmenytsia	4–1	FC Promin Sambor	3–0	1–1
Zirka-2 Kirovohrad	w/o	Kharchovyk Popivka		
Hirnyk Pavlohrad	-:+	Shakhtar Horlivka	1–2	-:+

=== Relegation play-offs (1st leg) ===
5 July 1998	FC Tysmenytsia (2L)	3 – 0	(AM) Promin Sambor
		[ Report]

5 July 1998	Zirka-2 Kirovohrad (2L)	+ : -	(AM) Kharchovyk Popivka
		[ Report]

Zirka-2 Kirovohrad won on walkover after Kharchovyk Popivka withdrew from the play-offs.

5 July 1998	Hirnyk Pavlohrad (2L)	1 – 2	(AM) Shakhtar Horlivka
		[ Report]

=== Relegation play-offs (2nd leg) ===
11 July 1998	Promin Sambor (AM)	1 – 1	(2L) FC Tysmenytsia
		[ Report]

Tysmenytsia won 4–1 on aggregate.

11 July 1998	Shakhtar Horlivka (AM)	+ : -	(2L) Hirnyk Pavlohrad
		[ Report]

Shakhtar Horlivka won on walkover after Hirnyk Pavlohrad did not arrive.

== See also ==
- 1997–98 Ukrainian Top League
- 1997–98 Ukrainian First League
- 1997–98 Ukrainian Cup
- 1997–98 Ukrainian Football Amateur League
