= 2010 Ukrainian Amateur Cup =

2010 Ukrainian Cup among amateurs
Tournament details
- Country: Ukraine
- Teams: 24

Final positions
- Champions: Beregvidek Berehove
- Runners-up: Slovkhlib Sloviansk

The 2010 Ukrainian Amateur Cup was the fifteenth annual season of Ukraine's football knockout competition for amateur football teams. The competition started on 11 August 2010 and concluded on 31 October 2010.

The cup holders FC Karpaty Yaremche did not enter.

== Participated clubs ==
In bold are clubs that were active at the same season AAFU championship (parallel round-robin competition).

- AR Crimea: Foros Yalta
- Chernihiv Oblast: **Yednist-2 Plysky**
- Donetsk Oblast: Slovkhlib Sloviansk
- Ivano-Frankivsk Oblast: Sniatyn-Yevromodul
- Kharkiv Oblast: **Lokomotyv Kupyansk**
- Kherson Oblast (2): Krystal Kherson, **Myr Hornostayivka**
- Khmelnytskyi Oblast: Ahro-Zbruch Volochysk
- Kirovohrad Oblast (2): **Olimpik Kirovohrad**, **UkrAhroKom Holovkivka**
- Kyiv Oblast (2): Liha Vyshneve, Putrivka
- Lviv Oblast (2): Karpaty Kamianka-Buzka, Sambir
- Luhansk Oblast: Popasna
- Mykolaiv Oblast (2): Teplovyk Yuznoukrayinsk, Voronivka
- Poltava Oblast: Nove Zhyttia Andriivka
- Rivne Oblast: **ODEK Orzhiv**
- Ternopil Oblast: Marspyrt Nahiryanka
- Vinnytsia Oblast: Sharhorod
- Zakarpattia Oblast: Beregvidek Berehove
- Zhytomyr Oblast (2): Zoria-Enerhia Romaniv, **Zviahel-750 Novohrad-Volynskyi**

== Bracket ==
The following is the bracket that demonstrates the last four rounds of the Ukrainian Cup, including the final match. Numbers in parentheses next to the match score represent the results of a penalty shoot-out.

Round of 16
Karpaty Kamyanka-Buzka	**2**	0	2
**Beregvidek Berehove**	0	**5**	**5**
**Ahro-Zbruch Volochysk**	1	**4**	**5**
Zviahel-750 Novohrad-Volynsky	1	2	3
FC Sharhorod	1	-	-
**FC Putrivka**	**4**	+	+
ODEK Orzhiv	1	0	1
**Liha Vyshneve**	**2**	**1**	**3**
Lokomotyv Kupyansk	0	0	0
**Slovkhlib Sloviansk**	0	**1**	**1**
**Nove Zhyttia Andriyivka**	**3**	1	**4**
Yednist-2 Plysky	0	**3**	3
**Myr Hornostayivka**	**5**	1	**6**
FC Voronivka	1	**3**	4
**Krystal Kherson**	**2**	1	**3**
Teplovyk Yuzhnoukrayinsk	1	1	2

Quarter-finals
Ahro-Zbruch Volochysk	**1**	0	1
**Beregvidek Berehove**	0	**3**	**3**
Liha Vyshneve	0	0	0
**FC Putrivka**	0	**1**	**1**
Nove Zhyttia Andriyivka	0	0	0
**Slovkhlib Sloviansk**	**1**	**1**	**2**
**Myr Hornostayivka**	1	**3**	**4**
Krystal Kherson	**2**	0	2

Semi-finals
FC Putrivka	**2**	1	3
**Beregvidek Berehove**	0	**4**	**4**
Myr Hornostayivka	0	0	0
**Slovkhlib Sloviansk**	**2**	**2**	**4**

Final
**Beregvidek Berehove**	**2**	2	**4**
Slovkhlib Sloviansk	0	2	2

== Competition schedule ==
=== First qualification round ===
Team 1	Agg.	Team 2	1st leg	2nd leg
Sambir	1 – 5	**Beregvidek Berehove**	1–1	0–4
Sniatyn-Yevromodul Sniatyn	2 – 4	**Ahro-Zbruch Volochysk**	2–2	0–2
**Sharhorod**	1 – 1 (5–4 p)	Marspyrt Nahiryanka	1–0	0–1
Zoria-Enerhiya Romaniv	0 – 13	**Liha Vyshneve**	0–4	0–9
UkrAhroKom Holovkivka	2 – 3	**Nove Zhyttia Andriyivka**	1–1	1–2
Popasna	1 – 2	**Slovkhlib Sloviansk**	1–0	0–2
Foros Yalta	2 – 4	**Myr Hornostayivka**	1–1	1–3
**Teplovyk Yuzhnoukrayinsk**	6 – 3	Olimpik Kirovohrad	5–1	1–2

- Byes: Karpaty Kamianka-Buzka, Putrivka, Lokomotyv Kupyansk, Voronivka, Krystal Kherson, Zviahel-750 Novohrad-Volynskyi, ODEK Orzhiv, Yednist-2 Plysky

=== Second qualification round ===
Team 1	Agg.	Team 2	1st leg	2nd leg
Karpaty Kamianka-Buzka	2 – 5	**Beregvidek Berehove**	2–0	0–5
Sharhorod	w / o	**Putrivka**	1–4	DNP
Lokomotyv Kupyansk	0 – 1	**Slovkhlib Sloviansk**	0–0	0–1
**Myr Hornostayivka**	6 – 4	Voronivka	5–1	1–3
**Krystal Kherson**	3 – 2	Teplovyk Yuzhnoukrayinsk	2–1	1–1
**Ahro-Zbruch Volochysk**	5 – 3	Zviahel-750 Novohrad-Volynsky	1–1	4–2
ODEK Orzhiv	1 – 3	**Liha Vyshneve**	1–2	0–1
**Nove Zhyttia Andriyivka**	4 – 3	Yednist-2 Plysky	3–0	1–3

=== Quarterfinals (1/4) ===
Team 1	Agg.	Team 2	1st leg	2nd leg
Ahro-Zbruch Volochysk	1 – 3	**Beregvidek Berehove**	1–0	0–3
Liha Vyshneve	0 – 1	**Putrivka**	0–0	0–1
Nove Zhyttia Andriyivka	0 – 2	**Slovkhlib Sloviansk**	0–1	0–1
**Myr Hornostayivka**	4 – 2	Krystal Kherson	1–2	3–0

=== Semifinals (1/2) ===
Team 1	Agg.	Team 2	1st leg	2nd leg
Putrivka	3 – 4	**Beregvidek Berehove**	2–0	1–4
Myr Hornostayivka	0 – 4	**Slovkhlib Sloviansk**	0–2	0–2

=== Final ===
Team 1	Agg.	Team 2	1st leg	2nd leg
**Beregvidek Berehove**	4 – 2	Slovkhlib Sloviansk	2–0	2–2

Winner of the 2010 Ukrainian Football Cup among amateur teams
**Beregvidek Berehove (Zakarpattia Oblast)**; **1st time**

== See also ==
- 2010 Ukrainian Football Amateur League
- 2010–11 Ukrainian Cup
