= Mykhaylo Hurka =

Ukrainian footballer and manager

Mykhailo Hurka
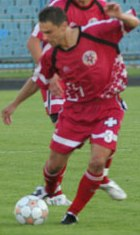
- Hurka in 2008

Personal information
- Full name: Mykhailo Petrovych Hurka
- Date of birth: 21 November 1975 (age 50)
- Place of birth: Lviv, Ukrainian SSR
- Position: Defender

Senior career*
Years	Team	Apps	(Gls)
1993–1995	FC LAZ Lviv	56	(2)
1996	FC Halychyna Drohobych	6	(2)
1995–1996	FC Karpaty Lviv	2	(0)
1996–1997	FC Lviv (1992)	58	(10)
1998–2000	FC Vorskla Poltava	26	(2)
1998–2000	→FC Vorskla-2 Poltava (loan)	20	(4)
2001–2002	FC Karpaty Lviv	12	(0)
2001–2002	→FC Karpaty-2 Lviv (loan)	25	(2)
2001–2002	→FC Karpaty-3 Lviv (loan)	4	(1)
2003–2006	FC Hoverla Uzhhorod	103	(10)
2006–2008	Obolon Kyiv	70	(2)
2008	FC Volyn Lutsk	10	(1)
2009	Desna Chernihiv		
2009	Nyva Ternopil	9	(0)
2010–2012	SC Beregvidek Berehove		
2013–2014	FC Khimik Novyi Rozdil	28	(6)
2014–2015	FC Halychyna Bibrka	25	(8)
2015	FC Halychyna Velykyi Doroshiv	7	(0)
2016–2019	FC Ukraine United		

Managerial career
- 2019: FC Ukraine United
- * Club domestic league appearances and goals

Mykhailo Hurka (Ukrainian: Михайло Петро́вич Гурка; born November 21, 1975) is a Ukrainian former footballer and manager.

== Club career ==
=== Early career ===
Hurka began his career at the youth level with Karpaty Lviv. He would join the professional ranks in 1993 by playing in the Ukrainian Second League with LAZ Lviv. In his debut season with FC LAZ, he helped the club achieve promotion to the Ukrainian First League, but the following season remained in the third tier with Halychyna Drohobych.

In 1995, he played in his country's top-tier league, the Ukrainian Premier League, with his former club Karpaty Lviv. Following a short stint in the Ukrainian First League with Lviv, he returned to the Premier League in 1997 to play with Karpaty Lviv.

=== Vorskla Poltava ===
After a season in the second tier, he returned to the premier league to sign with Vorskla Poltava in 1999. In his first year with Poltava, he played in the 1998 UEFA Intertoto Cup. He would re-sign with the club the following season. He would once more participate in European football, where he played in the 2000–01 UEFA Cup against Boavista.

=== First League ===
In 2002, he signed with Hoverla Uzhhorod and won the league title and a promotion to the Premier League in 2003.

In 2006, he returned to the third-division league to play with Obolon Kyiv, where he served as vice-captain. After several seasons with Obolon, he played in the First League initially in 2008 with Volyn Lutsk. For the 2009-10 season, he played for Nyva Ternopil, where he played in 9 matches.

He later played in the Ukrainian Amateur League with Beregvidek Berehove in 2010. Throughout his tenure with Berehove, he would win the 2010 Ukrainian Amateur Cup and participate in the 2010–11 Ukrainian Cup.

=== Canada ===
Hurka played abroad in the Canadian Soccer League in the summer of 2016 with FC Ukraine United. He was named the team captain and also served as an assistant coach. In his debut season with the Toronto-based club, he helped the team secure a playoff berth by finishing second in the First Division. In the first round of the postseason, Ukraine United defeated Brantford Galaxy. The Serbian White Eagles eliminated them from the competition in the following round. He also played in the Great Lakes Cup, a tournament for Ukrainian diaspora clubs, where Ukrainian United defeated KSH – United for the cup.

In his second season, the club was relegated to the second division. Hurka aided Ukraine United in achieving a perfect season and winning the championship title against Burlington SC. While in his third year, he assisted the club in securing the divisional title. In the preliminary round of the playoffs, Ukraine United successfully advanced to the semifinal round after defeating Brantford. Scarborough SC would eliminate Ukraine United in the semifinal round.

== Managerial career ==
In 2017, he joined the managerial staff as an assistant coach for Andrei Malychenkov, while still performing as an active player. In the 2019 season, he was elevated to the head coach position for Ukraine United, where he secured a playoff berth for the club by finishing third in the first division. Under his management, the club defeated Hamilton City in the opening round of the postseason. He successfully led the western Toronto side to the championship final after defeating SC Waterloo Region in the semifinals. In the CSL Championship finals, Ukraine United faced Scarborough SC but in a losing effort.

In 2021, he returned to Ukraine and became the assistant coach under Evgeny Yushchyshyn for FC Sambir. In 2026, he became a youth coach for his former club Karpaty Lviv.

== Honors ==
=== Player ===
FC Beregvidek Berehove

- Ukrainian Amateur Cup: 2010

FC Hoverla Uzhhorod

- Ukrainian First League: 2003-2004

FC Ukraine United

- CSL II Championship: 2017
- Canadian Soccer League First Division: 2018

=== Manager ===
FC Ukraine United

- CSL Championship runner-up: 2019
