= Football Association of Donetsk Oblast =

Football Association of Donetsk Oblast (FAD) is a football governing body in the region of Donetsk Oblast, Ukraine. The association started as a member of the Ukrainian Association of Football. Football competitions started long before the formation of the Football Association of Donetsk Oblast.

The Donetsk Oblast was formed on 2 July 1932 by combining territories of okruhas of the Ukrainian SSR of Starobilsk, Luhansk, Artemivsk, Stalino, and Mariupol. They also host local minifootball tournaments. Until 1938, Donetsk Oblast included the territory of Luhansk Oblast.

== Championship ==
- 1932 Horlivka City
- 1933 Metalist Kostyantynivka
- 1934 Dynamo Horlivka
- 1935 Dynamo Horlivka
- 1936 Koval Factory Stalino
- 1937 Stal Kostyantynivka
- 1938 Stakhanovets Stalino (res)
- 1940 Stakhanovets Ordzhonikidze
- 1941-43 not held (World War II)
- 1944 Stakhanovets Stalino
- 1945 Stakhnovets Rutchenkove
- 1946 Stal Makiivka
- 1947 Avanhard Kramatorsk
- 1948 Stal Kostyantynivka
- 1949 Metalurh Zhdanov
- 1950 Vodnyk Zhdanov
- 1951 Shakhtar Druzhkivka
- 1952 Shakhtar Stalino (Kuibyshevskyi District)
- 1953 Metalurh Zhdanov
- 1954 Shakhtar Yenakieve
- 1955 Shakhtar Budyonivka
- 1956 Metalurh Chasiv Yar
- 1957 Shakhtar Stalino (Kuibyshevskyi District)
- 1958 Metalurh Chasiv Yar
- 1959 Shakhtar Stalino (Kuibyshevskyi District)
- 1960 Shakhtar Stalino (Kuibyshevskyi District)
- 1961 Metalurh Yenakieve
- 1962 Metalurh Yenakieve
- 1963 Shakhtar Chystyakove
- 1964 Shakhtar Torez
- 1965 Start Dzerzhynsk
- 1966 Avtoshklo Kostyantynivka
- 1967 Shakhtar Krasnoarmiysk
- 1968 Shakhtar Makiivka
- 1969 Kolormash Artemivsk
- 1970 Shakhtar Snizhne
- 1971 Khimik Horlivka
- 1972 Khimik Horlivka
- 1973 Shakhtar Torez
- 1974 Hirnyk Makiivka
- 1975 Kirovets Makiivka
- 1976 Monolit Donetsk
- 1977 Mashynobudivnyk Druzhkivka
- 1978 Kirovets Makiivka
- 1979 Shakhtar Dzerzhynsk
- 1980 Tekstylnyk Donetsk
- 1981 Azovstal Zhdanov
- 1982 Bazhanovets Makiivka
- 1983 Kirovets Makiivka
- 1984 Metalurh Yenakieve
- 1985 Bazhanovets Makiivka
- 1986 Bazhanovets Makiivka
- 1987 Kirovets Makiivka
- 1988 Shakhtobudivnyk Donetsk
- 1989 Kirovets Makiivka
- 1990 Kolormash Artemivsk
- 1991 Harant Donetsk
- =independence of Ukraine=
- 1992 Harant Donetsk
- 1992/93 Kirovets Makiivka
- 1993/94 Shakhtar Selidove
- 1994/95 Kolos Ilovaisk
- 1995/96 Avanhard Kramatorsk
- 1996 Pivdenstal Yenakiieve
- 1997 Shakhtar Horlivka
- 1998 Koksokhim Avdiivka
- 1999 Fortuna Shakhtarsk
- 2000 Vuhlyk Dymytrov
- 2001 Slavkhlib Slovyansk
- 2002 Slavkhlib Slovyansk
- 2003 Slavkhlib Slovyansk
- 2004 Slavkhlib Slovyansk
- 2005 Slavkhlib Slovyansk
- 2006 Portovyk Mariupol
- 2007 Slavkhlib Slovyansk
- 2008 Slavkhlib Slovyansk
- 2009 Slavkhlib Slovyansk
- 2010 Avanhard Kramatorsk
- 2011 Slavkhlib Slovyansk
- 2012 Voda Donbasa Donetsk
- 2013 Ayaks Shakhtarsk
- 2014 Russo-Ukrainian War
- 2015 Slavkhlib Slovyansk (as Donbas championship)
- 2016 Slavkhlib Slovyansk (as Open championship of Donetsk Oblast)
- 2017 Sapfir Kramatorsk
- 2018 Sapfir Kramatorsk
- 2019 Prometei Velyka Novosilka
- 2020 Shakhtar Rodynske
- 2021 FC Slovyansk
- =full-scale Russian invasion=

=== Top winners ===
- 11 - FC Slavkhlib Slovyansk
- 4 - (Dynamo (Shakhtar), Shakhtar Stalino (Kuibyshevskyi District), Kirovets M., Pivdenstal (Metalurh))
- 3 - (Bazhanovets, Avanhard Kr., Sapfir)

== Cup winners ==
- 1996 FC Vuhlyk Dymytrov
- 2001 FC Pivdenstal Yenakiieve
- 2002 FC Slavkhlib Slovyansk
- 2003 FC Slavkhlib Slovyansk
- 2007 FC Slavkhlib Slovyansk
- 2008 FC Konti Kostyantynivka
- 2009 FC Slavkhlib Slovyansk
- 2012 FC Slavkhlib Slovyansk
- 2013 FC Nova-Lyuks Donetsk
- 2014 Russian invasion of Ukraine
- 2015 FC Slavkhlib Slovyansk

== Donbas Championship ==
Along with the Football association of Luhansk Oblast, the Association conducted united Donbas Championship since 2012. Since 2015 it served as the championship of Donetsk Oblast.

- 2012 USK Rubin Donetsk
- 2013 USK Rubin Donetsk
- 2014 Russian invasion of Ukraine
- 2015 FC Slovkhlib Slovyansk
- 2016 FC Slovkhlib Slovyansk

== Football Union of DNR (Russian occupation) ==
On 25 July 2015, the Union’s founding conference took place at the Shakhtar Plaza hotel complex in Donetsk. The organization's president became former Ukrainian international player Ihor Petrov. Denis Pushilin became honorary president, while Vyacheslav Sharafutdinov became executive director. The information about the event appeared on the news channel of the military organization "Oplot" and the Donetsk News Agency (DAN).

Besides the announced leadership, representatives of DNR agencies and the public participated in the conference, including Mikhail Mishin, deputies of the DNR People's Council, and representatives of the local public organization "Young Republic". Also, the conference was attended by representatives of the region’s football community, including heads of city and district football federations, mayors of cities and populated places, and veterans of Donbas football. Among the notable participating members of the conference were veterans of FC Shakhtar Donetsk, Viktor Zvyahintsev (head of the Donetsk City football federation), and Yuriy Dehteryov. Among visitors, the conference was attended by the LNR delegation headed by Yuriy Malyhin and head of the Diplomatic Mission of South Ossetia (Russian occupation of Georgia).

Earlier that year, Sharafutdinov informed that he had some health issues and was hospitalized. In 2016, Sharafutdinov said that he was never a fan of the Ukraine national football team. In 2019, Sharafutdinov gave an interview to the Russian news agency Komsomolskaya Pravda where he ridiculed the Ukrainian Association of Football administration, blaming them for groundless accusations, while Komsomolskaya Pravda highlighted that he was labeled as the "enemy" of Ukraine for his love of football.

In 2019, the Football Union of DNR elected its new president, Pavel Davydenko.

In 2016, the Confederation of Independent Football Associations provided its membership to the Football Union of DNR. Following formal annexation of the Donetsk Oblast by the government of the Russian Federation during the ongoing Russian aggression against Ukraine, the Confederation of Independent Football Associations delisted the Football Union of DNR from its members (around November of 2022).

=== DNR Championship ===
- 2016 FC Pobeda Donetsk
- 2017 FC Pobeda Donetsk
- 2018 FC Gvardeets Donetsk
- 2019 FC Gvardeets Donetsk
- 2020 FC Gvardeets Donetsk
- 2021 FC Gvardeets Donetsk
- 2022 not held
- 2023 FC Gvardeets Donetsk
- 2024 FC Niva Telmanovo

=== Additional tournaments in occupied areas ===
==== Liga Donbassa (DNR Republican League) ====
- 2019 Shakhter Sverdlovsk
- 2020 Antratsyt Kirovskoye

==== Sodruzhestvo ====
- 2023 Dinamo Lugansk
- 2024 ChF Chernomorets Sevastopol

== Professional clubs (Teams of football masters) ==
=== Teams of football masters competed in the Soviet Union (Ukrainian SSR) ===
locations of all professional clubs and "teams of football masters"
- FC Shakhtar Donetsk (Ugolschiki Horlivka, Stakhanovets), 1936-1941, 1945- (87 seasons)
  - FC Shakhtar-2 Donetsk (Metalurh Kostiantynivka), 1992-2006 (14 seasons)
  - FC Shakhtar-3 Donetsk, 2000-2015 (15 seasons)
- FC Stal Kostiantynivka, 1936f, 1937 (2 seasons)
- FC Kramatorsk (Avanhard), 1948, 1949, 1960-1970, 2011-2014, 2015-2021 (22 seasons)
  - FC Avanhard-2 Kramatorsk, 2019–2020 (a season)
- FC Lokomotiv Donetsk, 1958-1973 (16 seasons)
- FC Shakhtar Horlivka (Vuhlyk), 1959-1973, 1976-1988, 1992–1993, 1994–1995, 1998-2000 (22 seasons)
- FC Mariupol (Avangard, Azovstal), 1960-1964, 1966-1973, 1975–1989, 1992–2021 (58 seasons)
  - FC Metalurh-2 Mariupol, 2000-2012, 2016–2017 (13 seasons)
- FC Metallurg Yenakieve (Industria), 1963, 1964, 1968, 1969, 1997–1998 (5 seasons)
- FC Shakher Torez, 1965-1970 (6 seasons)
- FC Avangard Makiivka, 1966-1970 (5 seasons)
- FC Start Dzerzhynsk, 1966-1969 (4 seasons)
- FC Shakhter Yenakieve, 1965-1967 (3 seasons)
- FC Sitall Kostiantynivka, 1967-1969 (3 seasons)
- FC Ugolyok Krasnoarmiysk, 1968, 1969 (2 seasons)
- FC Shakhter Makiivka, 1972, 1973 (2 seasons)

=== Professional clubs competed(-ing) in Ukraine ===
- FC Shakhtar Makiivka, 1992-1999 (8 seasons)
- FC Shakhtar Shakhtarsk, 1992-1995 (4 seasons) → FC Metalurh Donetsk
- FC Metalurh Donetsk, 1996-2015 (19 seasons) → FC Stal Kamianske
  - FC Metalurh-2 Donetsk, 2001-2004 (3 seasons)
- FC Khartsyzk, 1992-1994 (3 seasons)
- FC Antratsyt Kirovske, 1992-1993 (2 seasons)
- FC Dynamo Sloviansk, 1995–1996 (a season)
- FC Metalurh Komsomolske, 1997–1998 (a season)
- FC VPS Kramatorsk, 1998–1999 (a season)
- FC Mashynobudivnyk Druzhkivka, 1999-2002 (3 seasons)
- FC Uholyok Dymytrov, 2002-2005 (3 seasons)
- FC Olimpik Donetsk, 2004-2021 (17 seasons)
- FC Tytan Donetsk, 2007-2009 (2 seasons)
- FC Makiivvuhillia Makiivka, 2011-2015 (4 seasons) → FC Nikopol
- FSC Mariupol (Yarud), 2020- (5 seasons)

== Other clubs at national/republican level ==
Note: the list includes clubs that played at republican competitions before 1959 and the amateur or KFK competitions after 1964.

- Avanhard Kramatorsk (Ordzhonikidze, Bliuminh), 1936-1940, 1946-1952, 1956-1959, 1974-1976, 1979, 1984, 1985, 1992-93, 1995-96, 2011
- Chystiakove (Torez), 1936-1938
- Bakhmut (Artemivsk), 1936, 1938
- Makiivka, 1936, 1938
- Krasnoarmiisk (Postysheve), 1936, 1937
- Horlivka, 1936
- Zenit Stalino (Stalina), 1936-1939
- Kostiantynivka, 1936
- Mariupol (Zhdanov), 1937, 1950
- Avanhard Horlivka, 1937-1940, 1946
- Sloviansk, 1937, 1938, 1948
- Druzhkivka, 1937
- Metalurh Makiivka (Stal), 1937, 1948-1951
- Metalurh Kostiantynivka (Stal), 1938, 1939, 1940, 1946, 1948-1952
- Stakhanovets Krasnoarmiisk, 1938
- Avanhard Druzhkivka, 1938-1940, 1959
- Metalurh Mariupol (Stal), 1946, 1948, 1949, 1951-1957
- Lokomotyv Yasynuvata, 1946, 1948, 1949
- Shakhtar Rutchenkove (Stakhanovets), 1946, 1948, 1950, 1951, 1959
- Shakhtar Chystiakove, 1948, 1956–1959, 1972, 1996-97, 1997-98
- Shakhtar Smolianka, 1948, 1949, 1958
- Shakhtar Horlivka, 1948, 1949, 1958, 1974, 1989-1991, 1993-94, 1997-98
- Shakhtar Yenakieve, 1948, 1951, 1955
- Shakhtar Druzhkivka, 1948, 1949
- Pivdenstal Yenakieve (Metalurh, Stal), 1948, 1949, 1957, 1970, 1985, 1987-1990, 1992-93, 1994-95, 1996-97, 1998-99, 2002
- Metalurh Horlivka (Stal), 1948, 1954, 1955
- Lokomotyv Debaltseve, 1948
- Azovstal Mariupol, 1948, 1980, 1982, 1987
- Lokomotyv Artemivsk, 1949–1957
- Metalurh Stalino, 1950-1952, 1958
- Khimik Horlivka, 1950-1952, 1971-1973
- Budivelnyk Zhdanov, 1951
- Metalurh Chasiv Yar, 1952
- Shakhtar Stalino, 1954-1956, 1967, 1984-1986
- Shakhtar Makiivka, 1957, 1969-1971, 1984, 1986, 1987, 1989, 1991, 1994-95
- Dzerzhynets Dzerzhynsk, 1957
- Shakhtar Budyonivka, 1957, 1958
- Avanhard Zhdanov, 1958, 1959
- Avanhard Yenakieve, 1958, 1959
- Ordzhonikidze Chasiv Yar, 1958
- Avanhard Chasiv Yar, 1959
- Khimik Makiivka, 1959
- Mashynobudivnyk Druzhkivka, 1964, 1975, 1988, 1990
- Avtosklo Kostiantynivka, 1965, 1971-1973
- Khimik Sloviansk, 1966, 1976, 1978
- GUS Horlivka, 1968
- Dzerzhynets Dzerzhynsk, 1970
- Tsvetmet Artemivsk, 1970-1974, 1986, 1988, 1991
- Sitall Kostiantynivka, 1970
- Vuhlyk Kramatorsk, 1970
- Vuhlyk Donetsk, 1971, 1992-93, 1993-94
- Shakhtar Snizhne, 1971, 1989, 1994-95
- Prometei Shakhtarsk, 1972, 1989-1991
- Vuhlyk Krasnoarmiysk, 1973, 1991
- Kirovets Makiivka, 1973, 1976, 1977, 1979-1985, 1988, 1990, 1993-94
- Vohnetryvnyk Chasiv Yar, 1974, 1975
- Lokomotyv Zhdanov, 1974
- Monolit Donetsk, 1974, 1975, 1977-1979
- Metalurh Artemivsk, 1976, 1977
- Shakhtobudivnyk Donetsk, 1977-1982, 1989
- Enerhia Kurakhove, 1980, 1981
- Shakhtar Dzerzhynsk, 1980-1990
- Shakhtar Ukrainsk, 1981
- Tekstylnyk Donetsk, 1981, 1983, 1987
- Mashynobudivnyk Artemivsk, 1983
- Udarnyk Snizhne, 1986
- Sotsdonbasovets Donetsk, 1988-1991
- Antratsyt Kirovske, 1990, 1991
- Novator Mariupol, 1990, 1991
- Krystal Torez, 1991-1994-95
- FC Khartsyzk, 1991, 1994-95, 1996-97, 1997-98
- Vuhlyk Dymytriv, 1992-93 – 1994-95, 2001
- Azovmash Mariupol, 1992-93, 1993-94
- Harant Donetsk, 1992-93, 1993-94
- Lidiyevka Donetsk, 1993-94, 1994-95
- Kholodna Balka Makiivka, 1993-94
- Shakhtar Selydove, 1994-95
- Hirnyk Makiivka, 1994-95
- Dynamo Sloviansk, 1994-95
- AFK-UOR Mariupol, 1994-95
- Aton Donetsk, 1994-95
- Metalurh Komsomolske, 1994-95, 1996-97, 1998-99 – 2001, 2004-2006
- Butovska Makiivka, 1994-95
- Hirnyk Torez, 1997-98
- Shakhta Ukraina Ukrainsk, 1997-98, 1998-99, 2000
- Fortuna Shakhtarsk, 2000
- Monolit Kostiantynivka, 2000-2002
- VAVK Volodymyrivka, 2001, 2002
- Slovkhlib Sloviansk, 2002, 2004, 2009
- Shakhtar Rodynske, 2002
- FC Torez, 2003
- Olimpik Donetsk, 2004
- Donbas-Krym Donetsk, 2007
- Makiivvuhillia Makiivka, 2011
- USC-Rubin Donetsk, 2013, 2014
- Yarud Mariupol, 2017-18, 2019-20

== Notable footballers ==
=== Soviet Union national football team ===
- Sergei Baltacha
- Volodymyr Troshkin
- Viktor Chanov
- Yuriy Dehteryov
- Viktor Zvyahintsev
- Viktor Fomin
- Valeriy Horbunov
- Viktor Hrachov

=== Ukraine national football team ===
- Taras Stepanenko
- Serhiy Rebrov
- Andriy Vorobey
- Yevhen Seleznyov
- Serhiy Popov
- Mykola Shaparenko
- Oleksandr Zubkov
- Bohdan Butko
- Yukhym Konoplya
- Anatoliy Trubin
- Oleksiy Byelik
- Valeriy Kryventsov
- Hennadiy Orbu
- Oleksandr Radchenko
- Ivan Ordets
- Oleksandr Pikhalyonok
- Serhiy Kovalyov
- Serhiy Kravchenko
- Mykyta Burda
- Yevhen Levchenko
- Eduard Tsykhmeystruk
- Serhiy Zadorozhnyi
- Oleh Ocheretko
- Serhiy Bolbat
- Dmytro Shutkov
- Dmytro Khomchenovskyi
- Oleksandr Koval
- Denys Kozhanov
- Oleksandr Zotov
- Serhiy Valyayev
- Ihor Petrov
- Oleksandr Spivak
- Serhiy Atelkin
- Yevhen Drahunov
- Oleksandr Haydash
- Volodymyr Savchenko
- Oleksiy Ivanov

== See also ==
- Regional football associations of Ukraine
- Donetsk People's Republic national football team
- FC Shakhtyor Donetsk (2025)
- Luhansk Oblast Football Association
