= 2004 Ukrainian Football Amateur League =

Ukrainian Football Amateur League
- Season: 2004
- Champions: KZEZO Kakhovka (2nd title) Slovkhlib Slovyansk (losing finalist)
- Promoted: 7 – Olimpik, Hirnyk, Real, Bershad, Yednist, Khimik, Kremin

The 2004 Ukrainian Football Amateur League season.

This season competition consisted of three stages. All of the stages were organized in regional principal and was played in two rounds where each team could play another at its home ground except the last one. The third stage was played in the single round to identify the finalists and the third place contenders. There were six groups in the first stage and four – in the second. The third part, which was the final consisted of two groups. The winners of groups advance to the finals and runners-up match up in the game for the third place.

== Teams ==
=== Returning ===
- Sokil Berezhany
- Kremin Kremenchuk

=== Debut ===
List of teams that are debuting this season in the league.

Rozdillia Novyi Rozdil, Karpaty Yaremche, ODEK Orzhiv, Torpedo Kostopil, Iskra Teofopil, FC Korosten, Interahrosystema Mena, Yednist Plysky, Lokomotyv Kupyansk, Khimik Krasnoperekopsk, HU ZIDMU-Spartak Zaporizhzhia, FC Slovyansk, Olimpik Donetsk, Metalurh Komsomolske

=== Withdrawn ===
List of clubs that took part in last year competition, but chose not to participate in 2004 season:

- Teplovyk Ivano-Frankivsk
- Prylad-LDTU Lutsk
- Fakel Varva
- Ikar Kirovohrad
- Shakhtar Sverdlovsk
- FC Luzhany
- KLO-CSKA Bucha
- DPA-TETs Cherkasy
- Kolos Stepove
- FC Torez
- Merkuriy-ChTEI Chernivtsi
- Dnipro Kyiv
- Naftovyk-2 Okhtyrka
- ZAlK Zaporizhia

=== Location map ===
Location of participating teams in the 2009 Ukrainian amateur championship

== First stage ==
=== Group A ===
Pos	Team	Pld	W	D	L	GF	GA	GD	Pts	Qualification
1	Karpaty Yaremche	8	4	4	0	15	5	+10	16	
2	Sokil Berezhany	8	4	2	2	14	8	+6	14	
3	ODEK Orzhiv	8	4	1	3	12	9	+3	13	
4	Iskra Teofipol	8	3	1	4	9	13	−4	10	Second Stage
5	Rozdillia Novyi Rozdil	8	1	0	7	3	18	−15	3	

=== Group B ===
Pos	Team	Pld	W	D	L	GF	GA	GD	Pts	Qualification
1	Yednist Plysky	8	6	1	1	27	8	+19	19	Second Stage
2	Yevropa Pryluky	8	5	2	1	18	10	+8	17	Second Stage
3	Volyn-Tsement Zdolbuniv	8	4	1	3	14	17	−3	13	Second Stage
4	Torpedo Kostopil	8	1	2	5	4	19	−15	5	
5	Korosten	8	0	2	6	6	15	−9	2	

=== Group C ===
Pos	Team	Pld	W	D	L	GF	GA	GD	Pts	Qualification
1	Nizhyn	4	2	2	0	3	1	+2	8	Second Stage
2	Bershad	4	1	2	1	6	3	+3	5	
3	Interahrosystema Mena	4	0	2	2	1	6	−5	2	joined Druha Liha

=== Group D ===
Pos	Team	Pld	W	D	L	GF	GA	GD	Pts	Qualification
1	Lokomotyv Kupyansk	6	4	0	2	10	7	+3	12	Second Stage
2	Slovyansk	6	3	2	1	15	9	+6	11	Second Stage
3	HU ZIMDU-Spartak Zaporizhzhia	6	1	2	3	8	12	−4	5	Second Stage
4	Olimpik Donetsk	6	1	2	3	9	14	−5	5	

=== Group E ===
Pos	Team	Pld	W	D	L	GF	GA	GD	Pts	Qualification
1	KZEZO Kakhovka	6	6	0	0	15	3	+12	18	Second Stage
2	Ukrrichflot Kherson	6	3	1	2	10	10	0	10	Second Stage
3	Ivan Odesa	6	1	1	4	8	12	−4	4	Second Stage
4	Khimik Krasnoperekopsk	6	1	0	5	3	11	−8	3	

=== Group F ===
Pos	Team	Pld	W	D	L	GF	GA	GD	Pts	Qualification
1	Hirnyk Kryvyi Rih	6	3	1	2	11	11	0	10	
2	Real Odesa	6	3	1	2	6	6	0	10	
3	Metalurh Komsomolske	6	2	2	2	6	4	+2	8	Second Stage
4	Kremin Kremenchuk	6	1	2	3	7	9	−2	5	

== Second stage ==
=== Group 1 ===
Pos	Team	Pld	W	D	L	GF	GA	GD	Pts	Qualification
1	Yednist Plysky	4	3	1	0	17	6	+11	10	Third Stage
2	Iskra Teofipol	4	1	1	2	5	12	−7	4	Third Stage
3	Volyn Zdolbuniv	4	1	0	3	8	12	−4	3	

=== Group 2 ===
Pos	Team	Pld	W	D	L	GF	GA	GD	Pts	Qualification
1	Nizhyn	4	2	1	1	5	2	+3	7	
2	Ivan Odesa	4	2	1	1	5	4	+1	7	Third Stage
3	Yevropa Pryluky	4	1	0	3	2	6	−4	3	Third Stage
4	Ukrrichflot Kherson	0	—	—	—	—	—	—	0	Withdrew

=== Group 3 ===
Pos	Team	Pld	W	D	L	GF	GA	GD	Pts	Qualification
1	KZEZO Kakhovka	8	7	1	0	20	3	+17	22	Third Stage
2	Slovyansk	8	3	3	2	16	16	0	12	Third Stage
3	Lokomotyv Kupyansk	8	3	2	3	8	7	+1	11	Third Stage
4	Metalurh Komsomolske	8	2	1	5	7	14	−7	7	Third Stage
5	HU ZIDMU-Spartak Zaporizhzhia	8	1	1	6	9	20	−11	4	

== Third stage ==
=== Group A ===
Pos	Team	Pld	W	D	L	GF	GA	GD	Pts	Qualification
1	Sloviansk	3	2	1	0	5	2	+3	7	Final game
2	Yevropa Pryluky	3	2	0	1	7	5	+2	6	Third place
3	Lokomotyv Kupiansk	3	1	1	1	2	3	−1	4	
3	Iskra Teofipol	3	0	0	3	5	9	−4	0	

=== Group B ===
Pos	Team	Pld	W	D	L	GF	GA	GD	Pts	Qualification
1	KZEZO Kakhovka	3	2	1	0	9	2	+7	7	Final game
2	Yednist Plysky	3	2	1	0	6	1	+5	7	Third place
3	Ivan Odesa	3	1	0	2	3	5	−2	3	
4	Metalurh Komsomolske	3	0	0	3	1	11	−10	0	

== Final ==
The game took place in Slovyansk, Donetsk Oblast. October 1, 2006.

Slovyansk - KZEZO Kakhovka 1:2 (1:1)

Match for the 3rd place
Yednist Plysky - Yevropa Pryluky 3:2

== Number of teams by region ==
Number	Region	Team(s)
4	Chernihiv Oblast	Interahrosystema Mena, FC Nizhyn, Yednist Plysky, Yevropa Pryluky
3	Donetsk Oblast	Metalurh Komsomolske, Olimpik Donetsk, FC Sloviansk
3	Rivne Oblast	ODEK Orzhiv, Torpedo Kostopil, Volyn-Tsement Zdolbuniv
2	Kherson Oblast	KZEZO Kakhovka, Ukrrichflot Kherson
2	Odesa Oblast	Ivan Odesa, Real Odesa
1	Autonomous Republic of Crimea	Khimik Krasnoperekopsk
1	Dnipropetrovsk Oblast	Hirnyk Kryvyi Rih
1	Ivano-Frankivsk Oblast	Karpaty Yaremche
1	Kharkiv Oblast	Lokomotyv Kupiansk
1	Khmelnytskyi Oblast	Iskra Teofipol
1	Lviv Oblast	Rozdillia Novyi Rozdil
1	Poltava Oblast	Kremin Kremenchuk
1	Ternopil Oblast	Sokil Berezhany
1	Vinnytsia Oblast	FC Bershad
1	Zaporizhia Oblast	ZIDMU-Spartak Zaporizhia
1	Zhytomyr Oblast	FC Korosten

== Sources ==
- Lander, Yurii (2008), Футбол в Украине 2007-2008 статистический ежигодник выпуск 17 [Football in Ukraine 2007-2008 statistical yearbook issue 17] (in Russian)
