= 1994–95 Ukrainian Football Amateur League =

Ukrainian Football Amateur League
- Season: 1994–95
- Champions: None (6 group winners): Khimik Kalush (Group 1); Haray Zhovkva (Group 2); Obolon-Zmina Kyiv (Group 3); Sportinvest Kryvyi Rih (Group 4); Dynamo Slovyansk (Group 5); Portovyk Illichivsk (Group 6)

1994–95 Amateur championship of Ukraine was the third amateur championship of Ukraine and the 31st since the establishment of championship among fitness clubs (KFK) in 1964. The format of competitions was preserved as in the Soviet competitions where there was six independent groups split by regional principal. A record of 91 teams participated in competitions.

== Teams ==
=== Location map ===
Locations of team home grounds in the 1994-95 Ukrainian Championship among amateur teams

=== Composition ===
Group 1		Group 2		Group 3	
Region	Teams	Region	Teams	Region	Teams
Lviv Oblast (4)	Shakhtar Chervonohrad	Rivne Oblast (1)	Izotop Kuznetsovsk	Kyiv (3)	Dynamo-3 Kyiv
Lviv Oblast (4)	Sokil Lviv	Ternopil Oblast (1)	Zoria Khorostkiv	Kyiv (3)	Olimpik Kyiv
Lviv Oblast (4)	ProminSambir	Lviv Oblast (2)	Haray Zhovkva	Kyiv (3)	Obolon-Zmina Kyiv
Lviv Oblast (4)	Medyk Morshyn	Lviv Oblast (2)	Hirnyk Novoyavorivsk	Kyiv Oblast (3)	Budivelnyk Brovary
Zakarpattia Oblast (3)	Lokomotyv Chop	Volyn Oblast (3)	Silmash Kovel	Kyiv Oblast (3)	Katekh Irpin
Zakarpattia Oblast (3)	Lokomotyv Chop	Volyn Oblast (3)	Silmash Kovel	Kyiv Oblast (3)	Skhid Slavutych
Zakarpattia Oblast (3)	Elektron Volovets	Volyn Oblast (3)	Shakhta 9 Novovolynsk	Kirovohrad Oblast (2)	Lokomotyv Znamianka
Zakarpattia Oblast (3)	Elektron Volovets	Volyn Oblast (3)	Shakhta 9 Novovolynsk	Kirovohrad Oblast (2)	Polihraftekhnika-Krystal Oleksandria
Zakarpattia Oblast (3)	Yalynka Velykyi Bychkiv	Volyn Oblast (3)	Pidshypnyk Lutsk	Chernihiv Oblast (2)	Tekstylnyk Chernihiv
Zakarpattia Oblast (3)	Yalynka Velykyi Bychkiv	Volyn Oblast (3)	Pidshypnyk Lutsk	Chernihiv Oblast (2)	Ahroservis Bakhmach
Ivano-Frankivsk Oblast (6)	Naftovyk Dolyna	Ivano-Frankivsk Oblast (1)	Probiy Horodenka	Sumy Oblast (3)	Kharchovyk Popivka
Ivano-Frankivsk Oblast (6)	Khimik Kalush	Khmelnytskyi Oblast (2)	Enerhetyk Netishyn	Sumy Oblast (3)	Budivelnyk Sumy
Ivano-Frankivsk Oblast (6)	Limnytsia Perehinske	Khmelnytskyi Oblast (2)	Petridava Kamianets-Podilskyi	Sumy Oblast (3)	Svema Shostka
Ivano-Frankivsk Oblast (6)	Pokuttia Kolomyia	Vinnytsia Oblast (2)	Avanhard Kryzhopil	Poltava Oblast (2)	Lokomotyv Hrebinka
Ivano-Frankivsk Oblast (6)	Beskyd Nadvirna	Vinnytsia Oblast (2)	Podillia Kyrnasivka	Poltava Oblast (2)	Hirnyk Komsomolsk
Ivano-Frankivsk Oblast (6)	Domobudivnyk Burshtyn	Cherkasy Oblast (1)	Yatran Uman	Cherkasy Oblast (1)	Nyva-Naftovyk Korsun-Shevchenk.

Group 4		Group 5		Group 6	
Region	Teams	Region	Teams	Region	Teams
Sumy Oblast (1)	Naftovyk-2 Okhtyrka	Kharkiv Oblast (2)	Vlasko Hlyboke	Crimea (2)	Surozh Sudak
Sumy Oblast (1)	Naftovyk-2 Okhtyrka	Kharkiv Oblast (2)	Vlasko Hlyboke	Crimea (2)	Chaika Okhotnykove
Kharkiv Oblast (3)	Avanhard Merefa	Kharkiv Oblast (2)	Metalurh Kupiansk	Odesa Oblast (7)	Dunay Izmail
Kharkiv Oblast (3)	Avanhard Lozova	Dnipropetrovsk Oblast (3)	Prometei Dniprodzerzhynsk	Odesa Oblast (7)	Blaho Blahoyeve
Kharkiv Oblast (3)	Yupiter-Skif Kharkiv	Dnipropetrovsk Oblast (3)	Kosmos Pavlohrad	Odesa Oblast (7)	Torpedo Odesa
Dnipropetrovsk Oblast (4)	Shakhtar Marhanets	Dnipropetrovsk Oblast (3)	Druzhba Mahdalynivka	Odesa Oblast (7)	Enerhiya Illichivsk
Dnipropetrovsk Oblast (4)	Era Nikopol	Luhansk Oblast (3)	Shakhtar Sverdlovsk	Odesa Oblast (7)	Dynamo Odesa
Dnipropetrovsk Oblast (4)	Sport-Invest Kryvyi Rih	Luhansk Oblast (3)	Ayaks Krasnyi Luch	Odesa Oblast (7)	Birzula Kotovsk
Dnipropetrovsk Oblast (4)	Budivelnyk Kryvyi Rih	Luhansk Oblast (3)	Hirnyk Bryanka	Odesa Oblast (7)	Ren Reni
Zaporizhzhia Oblast (1)	Zirka Zaporizhzhia	Donetsk Oblast (8)	Dynamo Sloviansk	Dnipropetrovsk Oblast (2)	Kryvbas-Ruda Kryvyi Rih
Donetsk Oblast (7)	Silur Khartsyzk	Donetsk Oblast (8)	Krystal Torez	Dnipropetrovsk Oblast (2)	Kryvbas-2 Kryvyi Rih
Donetsk Oblast (7)	Shakhtar Selydove	Donetsk Oblast (8)	AFK-UOR Mariupol	Mykolaiv Oblast (3)	Merkuriy Pervomaisk
Donetsk Oblast (7)	Pivdenstal Yenakieve	Donetsk Oblast (8)	Aton Donetsk	Mykolaiv Oblast (3)	Olimpiya Yuzhnoukrainsk
Donetsk Oblast (7)	Lidiyevka Donetsk	Donetsk Oblast (8)	Metalurh Komsomolske	Mykolaiv Oblast (3)	Nyva Nechayane
Donetsk Oblast (7)	Shakhtar Snizhne	Donetsk Oblast (8)	Butovska Makiivka	Kherson Oblast (3)	Kharchovyk Bilozerka
Donetsk Oblast (7)	Hirnyk Makiivka	Donetsk Oblast (8)	Donbaskraft Kramatorsk	Kherson Oblast (3)	Enerhiya Nova Kakhovka
Donetsk Oblast (7)	Vuhlyk Dymytriv	Donetsk Oblast (8)	Shakhtar Makiivka	Kherson Oblast (3)	Dzharylhach Skadovsk

== Group 1 ==
Pos	Team	Pld	W	D	L	GF	GA	GD	Pts	Promotion or relegation
1	Khimik Kalush (C)	24	16	6	2	37	12	+25	54	Promoted
2	Yalynka Velykyi Bychkiv	24	15	3	6	36	27	+9	48	
3	Pokuttia Kolomyya	24	13	7	4	37	13	+24	46	
4	Promin Sambir	24	11	8	5	33	23	+10	41	– (new)
5	Naftovyk Dolyna	24	10	8	6	31	19	+12	38	+ (new)
6	Medyk Morshyn	24	9	4	11	28	40	−12	31	– (new)
7	Limnytsia Perehinsk	24	9	2	13	22	3	+19	29	withdrew
8	Shakhtar Chervonohrad	24	8	4	12	18	31	−13	28	
9	Beskyd Nadvirna	24	7	6	11	24	27	−3	27	– (new)
10	Lokomotyv Chop	24	7	6	11	20	32	−12	27	+ (new)
11	Domobudivnyk Burshtyn	24	7	2	15	17	29	−12	23	withdrew
12	Sokil Lviv	24	6	5	13	14	31	−17	23	
13	Elektron Volovets	24	5	5	14	17	47	−30	20	

(C) Champions

== Group 2 ==
Pos	Team	Pld	W	D	L	GF	GA	GD	Pts	Promotion or relegation
1	Haray Zhovkva (C)	24	19	4	1	42	11	+31	61	Promoted
2	Zoria Khorostkiv	24	18	4	2	66	12	+54	58	
3	Probiy Horodenka	24	15	2	7	32	20	+12	47	
4	Silmash Kovel	24	10	6	8	24	24	0	36	
5	Pidshypnyk Lutsk	24	10	5	9	29	23	+6	35	withdrew
6	Yatran Uman	24	10	4	10	22	36	−14	34	
7	Enerhetyk Netishyn	24	10	3	11	23	29	−6	33	
8	Izotop Kuznetsovsk	24	9	2	13	12	26	−14	29	
9	Shakhta 9 Novovolynsk	24	9	2	13	10	36	−26	29	
10	Petridava Kamianets-Podilsky	24	7	5	12	19	38	−19	26	
11	Podillia Kyrnasivka	24	8	0	16	23	13	+10	24	withdrew
12	Hirnyk Novoyavorivsk	24	6	3	15	20	40	−20	21	withdrew
13	Avanhard Kryzhopil	24	4	0	20	10	24	−14	12	withdrew

(C) Champions

== Group 3 ==
Pos	Team	Pld	W	D	L	GF	GA	GD	Pts	Promotion or relegation
1	Obolon-Zmina Kyiv (C)	30	23	4	3	60	17	+43	73	Promoted
2	Dynamo-3 Kyiv	30	17	8	5	45	18	+27	59	
3	Ahroservis Bakhmach	30	16	9	5	54	29	+25	57	
4	Lokomotyv Hrebinka	30	13	10	7	57	34	+23	49	
5	Hirnyk Komsomolsk	30	14	7	9	36	39	−3	49	Promoted
6	Kharchovyk Popivka	30	12	10	8	31	30	+1	46	
7	Lokomotyv Znamianka	30	14	4	12	28	34	−6	46	
8	Tekstylnyk Chernihiv	30	13	6	11	28	22	+6	45	
9	Nyva-Naftovyk Korsun-Shevchenkivsky	30	12	7	11	36	45	−9	43	
10	Katekh Irpin	30	13	2	15	35	18	+17	41	withdrew
11	Svema Shostka	30	12	5	13	22	39	−17	41	
12	Polihraftekhnika-Krystal Oleksandriya	30	10	4	16	31	44	−13	34	
13	Budivelnyk Brovary	30	6	8	16	29	55	−26	26	
14	Skhid Slavutych	30	8	1	21	33	61	−28	25	Promoted
15	Olimpik Kyiv	30	6	3	21	12	56	−44	21	
16	Budivelnyk Sumy	30	6	2	22	25	21	+4	20	withdrew

(C) Champions

Notes

- FC Skhid Slavutych was promoted during the season and replaced FC Transimpeks Vyshneve.

== Group 4 ==
Pos	Team	Pld	W	D	L	GF	GA	GD	Pts	Promotion or relegation
1	Sportinvest Kryvyi Rih (C)	30	21	3	6	40	15	+25	66	Promoted
2	Avanhard Merefa	30	17	10	3	49	17	+32	61	
3	Silur Khartsyzk	30	18	4	8	38	21	+17	58	
4	Shakhtar Marhanets	30	18	3	9	47	31	+16	57	
5	Era Nikopol	30	15	6	9	40	32	+8	51	
6	Budivelnyk Kryvyi Rih	30	15	5	10	45	33	+12	50	
7	Shakhtar Selydove	30	13	3	14	40	40	0	42	
8	Pivdenstal Yenakiyeve	30	11	8	11	31	30	+1	41	
9	Yupiter Kharkiv	30	11	7	12	44	47	−3	40	
10	Lidiyevka Donetsk	30	10	7	13	41	50	−9	37	
11	Shakhtar Snizhne	30	9	8	13	37	43	−6	35	
12	Avanhard Lozova	30	9	7	14	27	34	−7	34	
13	Hirnyk Makiivka	30	9	6	15	31	51	−20	33	
14	Naftovyk-2 Okhtyrka	30	8	5	17	35	38	−3	29	
15	Zirka Zaporizhzhia	30	7	7	16	20	36	−16	28	
16	Vuhlyk Dymytriv	30	2	5	23	17	64	−47	11	

(C) Champions

== Group 5 ==
Pos	Team	Pld	W	D	L	GF	GA	GD	Pts	Promotion or relegation
1	Dynamo Sloviansk (C)	30	20	4	6	44	17	+27	64	Promoted
2	Shakhtar Sverdlovsk	30	20	3	7	69	32	+37	63	Promoted
3	Metalurh Kupiansk	30	19	3	8	45	25	+20	60	
4	Krystal Torez	30	17	6	7	53	36	+17	57	
5	Druzhba Mahdalynivka	30	14	6	10	29	26	+3	48	
6	Ayaks Krasnyi Luch	30	13	6	11	23	33	−10	45	
7	AFK-UOR Mariupol	30	11	9	10	26	38	−12	42	
8	Aton Donetsk	30	12	6	12	22	30	−8	42	
9	Hirnyk Brianka	30	13	3	14	39	54	−15	42	
10	Metalurh Komsomolske	30	12	5	13	32	48	−16	41	
11	Prometei Dniprodzerzhynsk	30	12	4	14	39	48	−9	40	Promoted
12	Vlasko Hlyboke	30	10	3	17	44	22	+22	33	withdrew
13	Butovska Makiivka	30	9	4	17	22	49	−27	31	
14	Donbaskraft Kramatorsk	30	7	3	20	16	30	−14	24	withdrew
15	Kosmos Pavlohrad	30	5	6	19	15	10	+5	21	merged w/FC Shakhtar Pavlohrad
16	Shakhtar Makiivka	30	5	3	22	18	38	−20	18	withdrew

(C) Champions

== Group 6 ==
Pos	Team	Pld	W	D	L	GF	GA	GD	Pts	Promotion or relegation
1	Portovyk Illichivsk (C)	32	24	5	3	62	25	+37	77	Promoted
2	Olimpiya FC AES Yauzhnoukrainsk	32	22	3	7	52	33	+19	69	merged w/FC Artania Ochakiv
3	Merkuriy Pervomaisk	32	20	4	8	34	24	+10	64	
4	Surozh Sudak	32	21	1	10	30	21	+9	64	
5	Dzharylhach Skadovsk	32	19	4	9	42	34	+8	61	
6	Chaika Okhotnykove	32	17	2	13	20	29	−9	53	
7	Blaho Blahoyeve	32	17	1	14	38	29	+9	52	
8	Dynamo-Dahma Odesa	32	15	7	10	41	38	+3	52	merged w/FC Chornomorets-2 Odesa
9	Byrzula Kotovsk	32	15	3	14	24	37	−13	48	
10	Enerhiya Nova Kakhovka	32	14	6	12	21	37	−16	48	
11	Kryvbas-Ruda Kryvyi Rih	32	14	5	13	40	29	+11	47	
12	Nyva Nechayane	32	12	2	18	33	47	−14	38	
13	Torpedo Odesa	32	6	3	23	16	22	−6	21	withdrew
14	Kharchovyk Bilozirka	32	6	2	24	21	26	−5	20	withdrew
15	Dunai Izmail	32	4	5	23	16	20	−4	17	withdrew
16	Kryvbas-2 Kryvyi Rih	32	3	2	27	12	29	−17	11	withdrew
17	Ren Reni	32	2	5	25	14	36	−22	11	withdrew

(C) Champions

== Promotion ==
For the next season the Third League was discontinued and teams were promoted to Second League which was expanded and contained couple of independent groups designed by geographic principle.

To the 1995–96 Ukrainian Second League were promoted all six group winners FC Khimik Kalush, FC Haray Zhovkva, FC Obolon-Zmina Kyiv, FC Dynamo Sloviansk, FC Portovyk Illichivsk, FC Sportinvest Kryvyi Rih.

In addition to the group winners to the professional competitions were admitted FC Skhid Slavutych which replaced bankrupted Transimpeks during the current season, Olimpiya FC AES Yuzhnoukrainsk was merged with Artania under the same name Olimpiya FC AES Yuzhnoukrainsk, FC Dynamo Odesa replaced Chornomorets-2, Kosmos Pavlohrad was merged with FC Shakhtar Pavlohrad. Promotion was also granted to three more teams FC Hirnyk Komsomolsk, FC Shakhtar Sverdlovsk, and FC Prometei Dniprodzerzhynsk.

== Number of teams by region ==
Number	Region	Team(s)
15	Donetsk Oblast	AFK-UOR Mariupol, Aton Donetsk, Donbaskraft Kramatorsk, Dynamo Sloviansk, Hirnyk Makiivka, Krystal Torez, Metalurh Komsomolske, Pivdenstal Yenakieve, Shakhta Butovska Makiivka, Shakhta Lidievka Donetsk, Shakhtar Makiivka, Shakhtar Selydove, Shakhtar Snizhne, Silur Khartsyzk, Vuhlyk Dymytrov
9	Dnipropetrovsk Oblast	Budivelnyk Kryvyi Rih, Druzhba Mahdalynivka, Era Nikopol, Kosmos Pavlohrad, Kryvbas-2 Kryvyi Rih, Kryvbas-Ruda Kryvyi Rih, Prometei Dniprodzerzhynsk, Shakhtar Marhanets, Sportinvest Kryvyi Rih
7	Ivano-Frankivsk Oblast	Beskyd Nadvirna, Domobudivnyk Burshtyn, Khimik Kalush, Limnytsia Perehinske, Naftovyk Dolyna, Pokuttia Kolomyia, Probiy Horodenka
7	Odesa Oblast	Birzula Kotovsk, Blaho Blahoyeve, Dunai Izmail, Dynamo Odesa, Enerhia Illichivsk, Torpedo Odesa, Ren Reni
6	Lviv Oblast	Shakhtar Chervonohrad, Haray Zhovkva, Hirnyk Novoyavorivsk, Sokil-LORTA Lviv, Promin Sambir, Medyk Morshyn
5	Kharkiv Oblast	Avanhard Merefa, Vlasko Hlyboke, Yupiter Kharkiv, Metalurh Kupiansk, Avanhard Lozova
4	Sumy Oblast	Svema Shostka, Kharchovyk Popivka, Budivelnyk Sumy, Naftovyk-2 Okhtyrka
3	Kherson Oblast	Enerhia Nova Kakhovka, Kharchovyk Bilozerka, Dzharylhach Skadovsk
3	Kyiv	Dynamo-3, Obolon-Zmina, Olimpik
3	Kyiv Oblast	Budivelnyk Brovary, Katekh Irpin, Skhid Slavutych
3	Luhansk Oblast	Ayaks Krasnyi Luch, Hirnyk Brianka, Shakhtar Sverdlovsk
3	Mykolaiv Oblast	Merkuriy Pervomaisk, Olimpia AES Yuzhnoukrainsk, Nyva Nechayane
3	Volyn Oblast	Pidshypnyk Lutsk, Silmash Kovel, Shakhta 9 Novovolynsk
3	Zakarpattia Oblast	Elektron Volovets, Lokomotyv Chop, Yalynka Velykyi Bychkiv
2	Autonomous Republic of Crimea	Chaika Okhotnykove, Surozh Sudak
2	Cherkasy Oblast	Nyva-Naftovyk Korsun-Shevchenkivskyi, Yatran Uman
2	Chernihiv Oblast	Ahroservis Bakhmach, Tekstylnyk Chernihiv
2	Khmelnytskyi Oblast	Enerhetyk Netishyn, Petridava Kamianets-Podilskyi
2	Kirovohrad Oblast	Lokomotyv Znamianka, Polihraftekhnika-Krystal Oleksandria
2	Poltava Oblast	Lokomotyv Hrebinka, Hirnyk Komsomolsk
2	Vinnytsia Oblast	Podillia Kyrnasivka, Avanhard Kryzhopil
1	Rivne Oblast	Izotop Kuznetsovsk
1	Ternopil Oblast	Zorya Khorostkiv
1	Zaporizhia Oblast	Zirka Zaporizhia
