= Sergei Semyonov =

Sergei Semyonov may refer to:

- Sergey Semyonov (writer) (1868–1922), Russian writer
- Serhiy Semenov (born 1988), Ukrainian biathlete
- Sergey Semenov (wrestler) (born 1995), Russia Greco-Roman wrestler
- Sergey Semenov (footballer) (born 1985), Ukrainian footballer
