= 1997–98 Ukrainian Amateur Cup =

1997—98 Ukrainian Amateur Cup
Tournament details
- Country: Ukraine

Final positions
- Champions: FC Zorya Khorostkiv
- Runners-up: FC Dalis Komyshuvakha

The 1997–98 Ukrainian Amateur Cup was the second annual season of Ukraine's football knockout competition for amateur football teams. The competition started on 28 September 1997 and concluded on 30 May 1998.

Last season winner FC Domobudivnyk participated in the 1997–98 Ukrainian Cup and was not able to play.

== Participated clubs ==
In bold are clubs that are active at the same season AAFU championship (parallel round-robin competition).

- Cherkasy Oblast (1): KKhP Talne
- Chernihiv Oblast (1): Cherksyl Chernihiv
- Chernivtsi Oblast (1): Mytnyk Vadul-Siret
- Dnipropetrovsk Oblast (1): Ahrovest Novooleksandrivka
- Donetsk Oblast (1): **FC Khartsyzk**
- Ivano-Frankivsk Oblast (1): **Enerhetyk Burshtyn**
- Kharkiv Oblast (1): **Enerhetyk Komsomolske**
- Kyiv (2): **Interkas**, RFUVK
- Kirovohrad Oblast (1): **Lokomotyv Znamianka**
- Lviv Oblast (1): Spartak Truskavets
- Mykolaiv Oblast (1): **SC Pervomaisk**
- Rivne Oblast (1): **Khimik Rivne**
- Sumy Oblast (1): **Kharchovyk Popivka**
- Ternopil Oblast (1): **Zorya Khorostkiv**
- Vinnytsia Oblast (1): Horyzont Koziatyn
- Volyn Oblast (1): Yavir Tsuman
- Zakarpattia Oblast (1): Lisnyk Perechyn
- Zaporizhia Oblast (1): **Dalis Komyshuvakha**
- Zhytomyr Oblast (1): Lider Novohrad-Volynskyi

Notes

- Returning teams that competed last season: FC Khartsyzk, Interkas Kyiv, Lider Novohrad-Volynskyi (as Zviahel-93)
- Seven regions did not provide any teams for the tournament, among which were Crimea and the oblasts of Kherson, Khmelnytskyi, Kyiv, Luhansk, Odesa, and Poltava.

== Bracket ==
The following is the bracket that demonstrates the last four rounds of the Ukrainian Cup, including the final match. Numbers in parentheses next to the match score represent the results of a penalty shoot-out.

Round of 16
Mytnyk Vadul-Siret	1	1	2 (4)
Yavir Tsuman (p)	1	1	2 (5)
Khimik Rivne	1	0	1
Zorya Khorostkiv	4	1	5
Interkas Kyiv	2	0	2
Horyzont Kozyatyn	0	0	0
Enerhetyk Burshtyn	2	0	2
Lider Novohrad-Volynsky	1	0	1
Ahrovest Novooleksandrivka	2	2	4
RVUFK Kyiv	1	1	2
FC Khartsyzk	2	-	-
Lokomotyv Znamyanka	3	+	+
Dalis Komyshuvakha	2	0	2
SC Pervomaisk	0	0	0
Kharchovyk Popivka	3	1	4
Enerhetyk Komsomolske	2	0	2

Quarter-finals
Yavir Tsuman	0	0	0
Zorya Khorostkiv	0	1	1
Interkas Kyiv	3	0	3
Enerhetyk Burshtyn	1	4	5
Lokomotyv Znamyanka	0	0	0
Ahrovest Novooleksandrivka	1	0	1
Dalis Komyshuvakha	1	2	3
Kharchovyk Popivka	0	1	1

Semi-finals
Zorya Khorostkiv	3	1	4
Enerhetyk Burshtyn	0	2	2
Dalis Komyshuvakha	3	2	5
Ahrovest Novooleksandrivka	1	1	2

Final
Dalis Komyshuvakha	1	0	1
Zorya Khorostkiv	2	0	2

== Competition schedule ==
=== First qualification round ===
Team 1	Agg.	Team 2	1st leg	2nd leg
Mytnyk Vadul-Siret	3–2	Spartak Truskavets	3–0	0–2
Yavir Tsuman	2–1	Lisnyk Perechyn	2–0	0–1
Ahrovest Novooleksandrivka	3–2	Cheksyl Chernihiv	2–1	1–1
RVUFK Kyiv	6–4	KKhP Talne	5–1	1–3

=== Second qualification round ===
Team 1	Agg.	Team 2	1st leg	2nd leg
FC Mytnyk Vadul-Siret	2–2 (4–5 p)	FC Yavir Tsuman	1–1	1–1
FC Khimik Rivne	1–5	FC Zorya Khorostkiv	1–4	0–1
FC Interkas Kyiv	2–0	FC Horyzont Kozyatyn	2–0	0–0
FC Enerhetyk Burshtyn	2–1	FC Lider Novohrad-Volynsky	2–1	0–0
FC Ahrovest Novooleksandrivka	4–2	FC RVUFK Kyiv	2–1	2–1
FC Khartsyzk	w/o	FC Lokomotyv Znamyanka	2–3	–
FC Dalis Komyshuvakha	2–0	SC Pervomaisk	2–0	0–0
FC Kharchovyk Popivka	4–2	FC Enerhetyk Komsomolske	3–2	1–0

=== Quarterfinals (1/4) ===
Team 1	Agg.	Team 2	1st leg	2nd leg
FC Yavir Tsuman	0–1	FC Zorya Khorostkiv	0–0	0–1
FC Interkas Kyiv	3–5	FC Enerhetyk Burshtyn	3–1	0–4
FC Dalis Komyshuvakha	3–1	FC Kharchovyk Popivka	1–0	2–1
FC Lokomotyv Znamyanka	0–1	FC Ahrovest Novooleksandrivka	0–1	0–0

=== Semifinals (1/2) ===
Team 1	Agg.	Team 2	1st leg	2nd leg
FC Dalis Komyshuvakha	5–2	FC Ahrovest Novooleksandrivka	3–1	2–1
FC Zorya Khorostkiv	4–2	FC Enerhetyk Burshtyn	3–0	1–2

=== Final ===
Team 1	Agg.	Team 2	1st leg	2nd leg
FC Dalis Komyshuvakha	1–2	FC Zorya Khorostkiv	1–2	0–0

Winner of the 1997–98 Ukrainian Football Cup among amateur teams
Zorya Khorostkiv (Ternopil Oblast); 1st time

== Ranking ==
Top-8

Pos	Team	Pld	W	D	L	GF	GA	GD	Pts	Final result
1	Zorya Khorostkiv	8	5	2	1	12	4	8	17	Champions
2	Dalis Komyshuvakha	8	5	2	1	11	5	6	17	Runners-up
3	Ahrovest Novooleksandrivka	8	4	2	2	10	9	1	14	Eliminated in semi-finals
4	Enerhetyk Burshtyn	6	3	1	2	9	8	1	10	Eliminated in semi-finals
5	Lokomotyv Znamyanka	4	2	1	1	6	3	3	7	Eliminated in quarter-finals
6	Interkas Kyiv	4	2	1	1	5	5	0	7	Eliminated in quarter-finals
7	Kharchovyk Popivka	4	2	0	2	5	5	0	6	Eliminated in quarter-finals
8	Yavir Tsuman	6	1	3	2	4	4	0	6	Eliminated in quarter-finals

== See also ==
- 1997–98 Ukrainian Football Amateur League
- 1997–98 Ukrainian Cup
