= Sergiy Sergeyev =

Sergiy Sergeyev may refer to:

- Serkan Atasay (born 1970), Ukrainian-born Turkish swimmer
- Sergiy Sergeyev (footballer) (born 1982), Ukrainian footballer
