= SC Dynamo Sloviansk =

SC Dynamo Sloviansk was a Ukrainian football team from Sloviansk, Donetsk Oblast that represented the Ukrainian Dynamo sports society and competed in the mid 1990s. The team played their home games at Stadion Khimik, which belonged to the local washing soda factory "Khimprom".

== Brief overview ==
The team appeared in the Ukrainian competitions for KFK teams (amateurs) in 1994. Dynamo placed 1st in their group during their first season and became a candidate for acceptance into professional competitions. And they were admitted in the summer of 1995.

On 1 August 1995, Dynamo entered the Ukrainian Cup competition, hosting Oskil Kupyansk in the Round of 256. They lost the match in extra time, when, with less than 5 minutes of gameplay, Oskil player Oleksandr Kryvoruchko scored the only goal. Entering the 1995–96 Ukrainian Second League season, on 6 August 1995, they made their debut in professional league competitions visiting Tytan Armyansk in Armyansk, Autonomous Republic of Crimea. They lost the match 0:4. Dynamo played the first half of the season, gaining one win, 8 draws, and 10 losses. Their only win came in the Round of 10, when Dynamo were visiting Portovyk Illichivsk in Chornomorsk (Illichivsk, at that time). They beat Portovyk 2:1. They did not return for the second half of the season, and the rest of their games were awarded to them as losses. Their last game Dynamo played was on 5 November 1995, which they lost 0:4 to Druzhba Berdyansk at home. It was also the biggest margin of goals they allowed in the game.

After the season, the team never resumed operations.

=== Head coach ===
- Oleh Zubarev

== See also ==
- FC Slavkhlib Slovyansk
