= 2019 Football Championship of Donetsk Oblast =

Football Championship of Donetsk Oblast
- Season: 2019
- Champions: Sapfir Kramatorsk

The 2019 Football Championship of Donetsk Oblast was won by Sapfir Kramatorsk.

== League table ==
Pos	Team	Pld	W	D	L	GF	GA	GD	Pts	Qualification or relegation
1	Sapfir Kramatorsk (C)	16	13	0	3	56	17	+39	26	Champion
2	Prometei Velyka Novosilka	16	12	2	2	33	13	+20	26	
3	FC Pokrovsk	16	9	4	3	24	15	+9	22	
4	FC Sloviansk	16	7	4	5	26	23	+3	18	
5	Avanhard-19 Kramatorsk	16	8	0	8	21	22	−1	16	
6	FC Dolyna	16	4	6	6	17	23	−6	14	
7	DVUOR Bakhmut	16	5	1	10	22	29	−7	11	
8	Shakhtar Rodynske	16	3	3	10	18	35	−17	9	
9	Sparta Dobropillia	16	1	0	15	16	56	−40	2	
–	Avanhard-TES (X)	0	0	0	0	0	0	0	0	Withdrew
–	Forum-Avto Kramatorsk (X)	0	0	0	0	0	0	0	0	Withdrew
–	Alex (X)	0	0	0	0	0	0	0	0	Withdrew

Source: "Чемпионат Донецкой области 2019". Footballfacts.ru.
(C) Champions; (X) Withdrew
