= FC Zoria Khorostkiv =

Association football club from Khorostkiv, Ukraine

FC Zoria Khorostkiv (Ukrainian: "Зоря" Хоростків) is an amateur Ukrainian football club from Khorostkiv, Chortkiv Raion, Ternopil Oblast.

== History ==
The club's most notable performance came in the 1990s, when they competed in national amateur competitions. In particular, they became the first winners of the AAFU Cup in 1998 and the second winner of the Ukrainian post-Soviet football cup competitions for amateurs. After winning the 1997–98 Ukrainian Amateur Cup, Zorya qualified for the 1998–99 Ukrainian Cup. The Khorostkiv team was eliminated in the preliminary round by their territorial neighbors, Krystal Chortkiv.

However, Zorya has competed in Ukrainian national/republican football competitions since 1980, when they debuted in the 1980 KFK football competitions. Competing in Group 2, they placed 2nd among 12 participants. The next year, the Khorostkiv team placed 1st in their Group 2, which had 12 participants, and qualified for the final group. In the final tournament, Zorya placed 5th among 6 participants. After that, Zorya Khorostkiv disappeared from national/republican competitions, playing mostly at the Ternopil Oblast regional competitions. After the dissolution of the Soviet Union, Zorya returned to national competition and joined the 1992–93 Ukrainian KFK competitions, where it was placed in Group 2, which had 13 participants. Zorya finished 4th and 14 points behind the group leader. Starting from the 1992–93, they stayed at the amateur competitions until 1997. In the 1993–94 Ukrainian KFK competitions, they finished 4th again among 12 participants, behind clubs such as Obolon Kyiv. Next season, Zorya finished 2nd ahead of such clubs as Probiy Horodenka. In the 1995–96 Ukrainian KFK competitions Zoria Khorostkiv won a group and qualified for the 1996–97 Ukrainian Second League, but declined their promotion. The reason, a death of the sponsor's director. The next season, the Khorostkiv team's performance declined; in their group of 5 participants, they placed 3rd. They did not finish the season and withdrew halfway through. In the 1997–98 Ukrainian Football Amateur League, Zorya Khorostkiv finished 1st in Group 2 and qualified for the final tournament, which was held in Burshtyn. But they refused to participate further.

== Honours ==
List of honours

- Ukrainian Championship for amateurs
  - Winner: 1995–96
  - Runner-up: 1994–95
- Ukrainian Cup for amateurs (AAFU Cup)
  - Winner: 1997–98
- Ternopil Oblast Championship
  - Winner: 1982, 1995–96, 1996–97, 1997–98
  - Runner-up: 1979, 1998–99, 1999 (autumn), 2000, 2002, 2003, 2004, 2005
- Ternopil Oblast Cup
  - Winner: 1981, 1996–97, 1998–99
  - Runner-up: 1992

== Selected head coaches ==
- 1980 - 1981 Viktor Kozin
- 1996 Mykhailo Zavalnyuk
- 1996 - 1998 Volodymyr Venhrynovych
- 2000 Volodymyr Venhrynovych
