= Arsen Ivanyushchenko =

Ukrainian footballer

Personal information
- Full name: Arsen Yuiryovych Ivanyushchenko
- Date of birth: 16 November 1991 (age 34)
- Place of birth: Yenakiieve, Ukraine
- Height: 1.80 m (5 ft 11 in)
- Position: Forward

Youth career
- Years: Team
- 2008-2009: Dynamo Kyiv

Arsen Yuriyovych Ivanyushchenko (Ukrainian: Арсен Юрійович Іванющенко; born on 16 November 1991), is a Ukrainian former football player who played for Dynamo Kyiv reserve (junior) team from 2008 to 2009. He recorded just over 20 games in the Ukrainian Premier League youth competitions during two seasons (2008–09 and 2009–10).

He is better known for being the son of the former member of the Verkhovna Rada Yuriy Ivanyushchenko. His father was an associate of the Donetsk Clan.

He has now since been a shareholder of Skyrose. According to the British government, Ivanyuschenko holds 75% or more shares of that company.
