= Yuriy Ivanyushchenko =

Ukrainian politician and crime boss

- Юрій Іванющенко
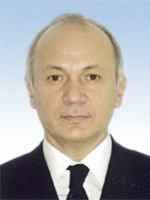

People's Deputy of Ukraine
- In office 12 December 2007 – 27 November 2014

Personal details
- Born: 21 February 1959 (age 67) Yenakiieve, Ukrainian SSR, Soviet Union
- Party: Party of Regions
- Spouse: Iryna Volodymyrivna

Yuriy Volodymyrovych Ivanyushchenko (Ukrainian: Юрій Володимирович Іванющенко; born 21 February 1959) is a Ukrainian politician and crime boss who served as a People's Deputy of Ukraine from 2007 to 2014, representing the Party of Regions.

According to the Ukrainian magazine "Correspondent", in 2011, he took 2nd place in the top 100 most influential Ukrainians. According to the Ukrainian magazine Focus, in 2012, he took 26th place in the list of 200 most influential people in Ukraine, as his fortune was estimated at $756 million , and in 2013, he moved to 24th place in the same ranking of the same magazine.

== Biography ==
Volodymyr Ivanyuschenko was born on 21 February 1959 in Yenakiieve, Stalin Oblast. In 1961, the region was renamed to Donetsk Oblast.

From 1974 1978, he studied at the Yenakiieve Mining College.

From 1978 to 1980, he served in the Soviet Army.

From 1981 to 1996, he was a foreman of an electric workshop, a senior foreman, a deputy head of a workshop, a deputy chief power engineer, a deputy director for economics of the Yenakiyevo Coke-Chemical Plant, which he acquired in the early 1990s.

Between 1996 and 2005, he was the director of economics and then promoted as president of Alvi-Invest.

Between 2003 and 2007 he studied at the Berdyansk University of Economics and Management, specialty: accounting and auditing, qualification: bachelor. At the end of 2007, he graduated from Berdyansk University of Economics and Management.

Between 2005 and September 2007 he was the president of UGK-2000 LLC.

In March 2006, Ivanyushchenko was a candidate for People's Deputies of Ukraine in the Verkhovna Rada from the Revival Party, No. 14 on the list. At the time of the election, as President of UGK-2000 LLC, he was a non-partisan.

From December 2007 to 12 December 2012, Ivanyushchenko was the member of parliament as the People's Deputy of Ukraine of the Verkhovna Rada of the 6th convocation from the Party of Regions (No. 111 in the electoral list). He was a non-partisan politician at the time of that election, when he was the President of UGK-2000 LLC. He also appeared at the parliament very rarely.

On 12 December 2012, Ivanyushchenko was reelected as the People's Deputy of Ukraine of the VII convocation from the Party of Regions, (No. 24 in the electoral list). Yuriy Boldyrev explained his inclusion in the checkpoint of the party list of the People's Deputy from the Party of Regions by the fact that Ivanyushchenko is a sponsor of the party.

On 25 March 2013, according to the Express newspaper, he was "leading" in the list of absentee deputies of the Verkhovna Rada of Ukraine of the 7th convocation, being present at only one of the seven sittings of the parliament.

In July 2013, Ivanyushchenko was awarded the title of "honorary citizen of the city of Yenakiyevo" for "significant contribution to the spiritual and literary development of the city of Yenakiyevo, active social activity." He sponsored the amateur football club "FC Slovkhlib Slovyansk".

== Controversies ==
According to the media, Ivanyushchenko is a well-known crime boss (criminal authority) nicknamed Yura of Yenakieve ("Yura Yenakiyevskiy)."

He was also a close associate of President of Ukraine Viktor Yanukovych.

=== Criminal prosecution ===
He disappeared from the sight of law enforcement officers on 15 December 2014. The Minsister of Internal Affairs, Arsen Avakov said Ivanyushchenko organized and funded "titushky" who abducted, beat and killed Euromaidan activists in February 2014.

At the end of January 2015, Ivanyushchenko was put on the wanted list by the Main Directorate for Combating Organized Crime of the Ministry of Internal Affairs of Ukraine. The Prosecutor General's Office suspects him of organizing the embezzlement of someone else's property and illegal enrichment on an especially large scale under the following articles of the Criminal Code of Ukraine:

- Part 3 of Article 27 (types of accomplices);
- Part 5 of Art. 191 of the Criminal Code (misappropriation, waste of property on an especially large scale);
- Part 3 of Article 368 (acceptance of an offer, promise or receipt of an unlawful benefit by an official).

On 2 December 2016, the Kyiv Court of Appeals ruled that MP from the BPP Serhiy Leshchenko should refute his statements about the former deputy from the Party of Regions, Ivanyushchenko, whom he accused of involvement in the murders of Euromaidan activists.

In January 2015, a Ukrainian court seized more than 72 million Swiss francs in Ivanyushchenko's due money in his Swiss bank accounts. The Prosecutor General's Office seized his accounts in Ukrainian banks and the fleet, and requests for international legal assistance were sent to Latvia, Monaco and Switzerland to seize funds abroad.

Verkhovna Rada deputy Oleh Nedava, who defends Ivanyushchenko's interests, stated that the prosecution of Ivanyushchenko was illegal, despite the fact that the investigation had evidence of his involvement in a number of crimes. The Kyiv Court of Appeals decided on January 1 this year to uphold the decision of the investigating judge of the Pechersk District Court of November 25, 2016, which overturned the petition of the senior investigator against Ivanyushchenko and left unsatisfied the appeal of prosecutor Panchishin.

However, in 2017, the Kyiv Court of Appeals considered the complaint of the Ivanyushchenko's lawyers, and found the statements of the deputy of the Verkhovna Rada Serhiy Leshchenko, voiced in the live broadcast of the Shuster Live program as unreliable, obliging him to refute the slanderous insinuations about Ivanyushchenko's involvement in the delivery of titushki to the time of Euromaidan, as well as theft in the state corporation "Ukrspirt". On 30 November 2016, the Kyiv Court of Appeals ruled to satisfy Ivanyushchenko's claim against Leshchenko for the protection of honor, dignity and business reputation. Claims of Ivanyushchenko to the editor-in-chief of the portal "Censor.net" to Yuri Butusov on the protection of honor, dignity and business reputation were satisfied by the court on 18 January 2017.

On 26 January 2017, the court ruled to uphold the decision of the Solomyansky District Court of 27 January 2016, which made a positive decision on the case of the inaction of the Deputy Prosecutor General of Ukraine, Stolyarchuk at the stage of pre-trial investigation. The latest decision of the collegium of the Supreme Court is not subject to appeal. On January 27, 2017, the judicial board of the Chamber of the Supreme Court for Criminal Cases of Ukraine ruled to satisfy the complaint of Ivanyushchenko on charges of the Deputy Prosecutor General of Ukraine of inaction at the stage of pre-trial investigation. The court also ruled to refuse the Deputy Prosecutor General of Ukraine to start office work in relation to Ivanyushchenko. In other words, the decision of the Deputy Prosecutor General to open a case against Ivanyushchenko was rejected by the court.

On 28 February 2017, it became known that the Supreme Court of Ukraine closed all criminal proceedings against Ivanyushchenko. According to MP Leshchenko, Hryhoriy Surkis, his longtime business partner, and Borys Lozhkin, the former head of the Administration of the President of Ukraine, they agreed that they played a significant role in ending the persecution of the oligarch. Surkis played a huge role in the termination of criminal cases and the lifting of sanctions against Ivanyushchenko. Lozhkin, who promoted his interests in the presidential circle, also assisted in the termination of cases against him.

Another proof of the disinterest of the Ukrainian authorities in Ivanyushchenko's persecution is the fact that he twice visited Ukraine without hindrance, despite the fact that he was on the wanted list. In July 2019, the Supreme Court refused to open cassation proceedings on the complaint of the Deputy Prosecutor General against the decision of the Kyiv Court of Appeals dated 03.04.2019, which upheld the decision of the judge of the Solomyansky court of Kyiv Bobrovnyk OV 27 January 2016, to close the criminal proceedings No. 42015000000000207 (concerning the theft of funds from the Kyoto Protocol in 2012–2014). The prosecutor's office tried to overturn the decision of Judge Bobrovnyk for three years.

Since the beginning of 2015, this money has been under arrest at the request of the Prosecutor General's Office of Ukraine. Earlier, Latvian and Lithuanian courts decided to confiscate $30 and 26 million each, belonging to Ivanyushchenko.

== Assets ==
He has a share in the Odesa market "Seventh Kilometer". In September 2011, he acquired 50% of the shares of the Mariupol Azovmash. The Ukrainian banks Daniel and Promeconombank, which ceased operations in 2014, were also associated with him.

According to various sources, together with the seized accounts and assets, the fortune of Ivanyushchenko is estimated at more than 200 million euros. Ivanyushchenko promised about a third of his fortune to high-ranking people from the circle of the President of Ukraine for resolving the issue of ending his criminal prosecution.

In his own words, he officially has 7-8 million dollars in a bank account and lives on interest. In March 2014, the Swiss government froze the assets of Ivanyushchenko, along with 28 other Ukrainian citizens who were related to the government.

In February 2014, pictures of one of the largest mansions in Koncha-Zaspa, with an area of 8 thousand m2, located on an area of 35 hectares, which was built by Ivanyushchenko, were published.

== Family ==
He is married to Iryna Volodymyrivna (born in 1962).

His son, Arsen (born 16 November 1991), played in the reserve squad of the Dynamo Kyiv, a co-owner of Euro Finance, and an ex-shareholder of Zakhidinkombank. His daughter, Yana (born in 1982), was ranked 96th out of 100 in the rating of the most influential women in Ukraine according to the Focus magazine in 2011.

He has a younger son, David (born 21 February 2009).
