= Oleh Nedava =

Ukrainian politician (born 1969)

- Олег Недава
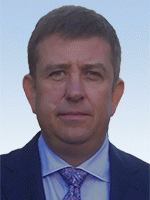

Member of Parliament in the Verkhovna Rada
- In office 27 November 2014 – 29 August 2019

Personal details
- Born: Oleh Anatoliyovych Nedava; 26 October 1969 (age 56) Makiivka, Ukraine, Soviet Union
- Party: Our Land

Oleh Anatoliyovych Nedava (Ukrainian: Олег Анатолійович Недава; born on 26 October 1969), is a Ukrainian politician who was a former member of parliament, a People's Deputy of Verkhovna Rada of the 8th convocation.

== Biography ==
Oleh Nedava was born on 26 October 1969 in Makiivka. From 1986 to 1991, he studied at the Donetsk Institute of Soviet Trade, specializing in commodity research and organization of trade.

From 1990 to 1992, he was a freight forwarder, and site manager of Ordzhonikidze-ugol, in Donetsk Oblast. In 1992, he was the deputy director of a small insurance company "Enakievo - ASKO", in Donetsk Oblast. From 1992 to 1998, he was promoted to become director of the Enakievo representative office of the Latvian representative office of the Baltiya Holding Company, in Donetsk Oblast.

From 1998 to 1999, Nedava served in the Ukrainian military service in the strategic missile forces.

From 1999 to 2003, he was the chairman of the board, deputy director for Foreign Economic Relations, deputy director for Marketing and Foreign Economic Relations, and deputy director for Economic Affairs of the Plant Management, Enakievsky Koksokhimprom CJSC, based in Yenakiyevo, in Donetsk Oblast.

From 2003 to 2007, he became the Director of CJSC Central Concentrating Plant "Uglegorskaya", in Uglegorsk, in Donetsk Oblast. During this time, from 2004 to 2006, he studied at the Donetsk National University, specializing in law.

From 2006 to 2010, he was a member of the Yenakievo city council of the 5th convocation.

From 2007 to 2012, he became the Director for Foreign Economic Affairs, United Cargo Transport Company LLC, in Yenakiyevo.

From 2011 to 2013, he studied at the Ivano-Frankivsk National Technical University of Oil and Gas, specializing business economics, and the State Ecological Academy of Postgraduate Education and Management, specializing ecology and environmental protection.

From 2012 to 2014, he was the Director for Foreign Economic Affairs, Karpatybudinvest.

Between 2013 and 2015, he was the chairman of the Board of Trustees of the public union "Program to promote the revival and integration of the East of Ukraine "Donbas"". At the same time, he was the Co-Chair of the National Forum "Waste Management in Ukraine: Legislation, Economics, Technologies".

On 26 October 2014, at the extraordinary elections of people's deputies of Ukraine, Nedava was elected a member of parliament, a people's deputy of Ukraine to the Verkhovna Rada.

In the parliamentary elections, he ran in single-mandate constituency No. 53 (Donetsk Oblast) as a self-nominated candidate, and went to the Rada, gaining 63.63% of the vote.

He was the Deputy Chairman of the Verkhovna Rada Committee on Environmental Policy, Nature Management and Elimination of the Consequences of the Chernobyl Disaster.

Mass media connect Nedava with Yuriy Ivanyushchenko.

In 2015, he was the coordinator of environmental legislative initiatives of the All-Ukrainian Ecological League. The same year, he was a member of the initiative group for the formation of the National Platform "Goals of Sustainable Development of Ukraine".

On 25 December 2018, he was included in the Russian sanctions list.
