= 1996–97 Ukrainian Football Amateur League =

Ukrainian Football Amateur League
- Season: 1996–97
- Champions: Elektron Romny (1st title) Tsementnyk-Khorda Mykolaiv (losing finalist)

1996–97 Amateur championship of Ukraine was the fifth amateur championship of Ukraine and the 33rd since the establishment of championship among fitness clubs (KFK) in 1964. The format of competitions was preserved as in the Soviet competitions where winner of six regional groups advanced to the final (second) stage.

First stage competitions were played in double round robin format where each team played with others four times. There were total of 33 teams competing. Final stage was introduced this season for group winners to identify the champion of the league.

== Teams ==
=== Location map ===
Locations of team home grounds in the 1994-95 Ukrainian Championship among amateur teams

== First stage ==
=== Group 1 ===
Pos	Team	Pld	W	D	L	GF	GA	GD	Pts	Qualification
1	Naftovyk Dolyna (Q)	12	7	4	1	16	4	+12	25	Finals
2	Promin Sambir	12	5	3	4	11	12	−1	18	
3	Zoria Khorostkiv	12	4	1	7	8	6	+2	13	withdrew
4	Medyk Morshyn	12	2	2	8	5	18	−13	8	
5	Berkut Bedevlia	0	0	0	0	0	0	0	0	withdrew

(Q) Qualified for the phase indicated

=== Group 2 ===
Pos	Team	Pld	W	D	L	GF	GA	GD	Pts	Qualification
1	Tsementnyk-Khorda Mykolaiv (Q)	12	11	0	1	15	5	+10	33	Finals
2	Izotop Kuznetsovsk	12	6	0	6	7	11	−4	18	
3	Dynamo Manevychi	12	5	0	7	3	5	−2	15	
4	Berd Berdychiv	12	2	0	10	2	6	−4	6	withdrew
5	Budivelnyk Zhytomyr	0	0	0	0	0	0	0	0	withdrew

(Q) Qualified for the phase indicated

Notes:

- Dynamo Manevychi replaced FC Kovel during the mid-season.

=== Group 3 ===
Pos	Team	Pld	W	D	L	GF	GA	GD	Pts	Qualification
1	Elektron Romny (Q)	16	14	0	2	26	5	+21	42	Finals
2	Slovianets Konotop	16	7	5	4	18	12	+6	26	Promoted
3	Dynamo-3 Kyiv	16	6	4	6	22	18	+4	22	Promoted
4	Kharchovyk Popivka	16	5	2	9	17	28	−11	17	
5	Nyva Myronivka	16	1	3	12	7	27	−20	6	
6	Budivelnyk Brovary	0	0	0	0	0	0	0	0	withdrew

(Q) Qualified for the phase indicated

=== Group 4 ===
Pos	Team	Pld	W	D	L	GF	GA	GD	Pts	Qualification
1	Pivdenstal Yenakiyeve (Q)	16	10	2	4	24	8	+16	32	Finals
2	Shakhtar Krasnyi Luch	16	8	0	8	14	17	−3	24	
3	Shakhtar Torez	16	6	3	7	21	21	0	21	
4	Enerhetyk Komsomolske	16	6	2	8	15	24	−9	20	
5	Krystal Parkhomivka	16	5	3	8	17	21	−4	18	

(Q) Qualified for the phase indicated

=== Group 5 ===
Pos	Team	Pld	W	D	L	GF	GA	GD	Pts	Qualification
1	Metalurh Komsomolske (Q)	20	13	4	3	21	15	+6	43	Finals
2	Avers Bakhmach	20	13	4	3	21	15	+6	43	Promoted
3	Lokomotyv Znamianka	20	10	4	6	22	16	+6	34	
4	Silur-Dynamo Khartsyzk	20	6	6	8	16	21	−5	24	
5	Lokomotyv Dnipropetrovsk	20	6	4	10	18	26	−8	22	
6	Sotel Kirovohrad	20	0	2	18	7	15	−8	2	withdrew
7	Blyskavka Berdiansk	0	0	0	0	0	0	0	0	withdrew

(Q) Qualified for the phase indicated

Notes:

- Game for the first place in Kremenchuk

Metalurh – Avers 3:2

=== Group 6 ===
Pos	Team	Pld	W	D	L	GF	GA	GD	Pts	Qualification
1	Chornomorets Sevastopol (Q)	8	7	1	0	5	2	+3	22	Finals
2	Obriy Nikopol	8	2	1	5	5	3	+2	7	withdrew
3	Mykolaiv-2	8	0	0	8	0	5	−5	0	withdrew
4	Tavria-Metalurh Prymorsk	0	0	0	0	0	0	0	0	withdrew
5	Kryvbas-Ruda Kryvyi Rih	0	0	0	0	0	0	0	0	withdrew

(Q) Qualified for the phase indicated

== Finals ==
The second stage was finals that took place in Romny, Sumy Oblast on June 11–15, 1997.

=== Group A ===
Pos	Team	Pld	W	D	L	GF	GA	GD	Pts
1	Elektron Romny	2	2	0	0	5	1	+4	6
2	Naftovyk Dolyna	2	1	0	1	2	3	−1	3
3	Metalurh Komsomolske	2	0	0	2	0	3	−3	0

=== Group B ===
Pos	Team	Pld	W	D	L	GF	GA	GD	Pts
1	Tsementnyk-Khorda Mykolaiv	2	2	0	0	4	2	+2	6
2	Chornomorets Sevastopol	2	1	0	1	3	3	0	3
3	Pivdenstal Yenakiyeve	2	0	0	2	0	2	−2	0

== Cup participants ==
Krystal Parkhomivka, Silur-Dynamo Khartsyzk, Dynamo Manevychi, Slovianets Konotop

== Number of teams by region ==
Number	Region	Team(s)
5	Donetsk Oblast	Metalurh Komsomolske, Pivdenstal Yenakieve, Shakhtar Torez, Silur-Dynamo Khartsyzk
3	Dnipropetrovsk Oblast	Kryvbas-Ruda Kryvyi Rih, Lokomotyv Dnipropetrovsk, Obriy Nikopol
3	Lviv Oblast	Medyk Morshyn, Promin Sambir, Tsementnyk-Khorda Mykolaiv
3	Sumy Oblast	Elektron Romny, Kharchovyk Popivka, Slovianets Konotop
2	Kharkiv Oblast	Enerhetyk Komsomolske, Krystal Parkhomivka
2	Kirovohrad Oblast	Lokomotyv Znamianka, Sotel Kirovohrad
2	Kyiv Oblast	Budivelnyk Brovary, Nyva Myronivka
2	Volyn Oblast	Dynamo Manevychi, FC Kovel
2	Zaporizhia Oblast	Blyskavka Berdiansk, Tavria-Metalurh Prymorsk
2	Zhytomyr Oblast	Berd Berdychiv, Budivelnyk Zhytomyr
1	Autonomous Republic of Crimea	Chernomorets Sevastopol
1	Chernihiv Oblast	Avers Bakhmach
1	Ivano-Frankivsk Oblast	Naftovyk Dolyna
1	Kyiv	Dynamo-3
1	Luhansk Oblast	Shakhtar Krasnyi Luch
1	Mykolaiv Oblast	SC Mykolaiv-2
1	Rivne Oblast	Izotop Kuznetsovsk
1	Ternopil Oblast	Zorya Khorostkiv
1	Zakarpattia Oblast	Berkut Bedevlia

== See also ==
- 1996–97 Ukrainian Amateur Cup
