= FC Metalurh Komsomolske =

Metalurh Komsomolske
- Full name: Football Club Metalurh Komsomolske
- Ground: Metalurh, Kalmiuske
- 2006: Amateurs, eliminated at qualifications

FC Metalurh Komsomolske was a Ukrainian professional football club from Kalmiuske, Donetsk Oblast, which at that time was known as Komsomolske. Later, after withdrawal from professional competitions, the club changed their name to Hirnyk.

In competitions of independent Ukraine, the club first appeared in 1994 during the 1994–95 Ukrainian Football Amateur League. The club was one of 15 teams from Donetsk Oblast that competed that season. Metalurh played in Group 5, one of the competition's six groups. With 41 points, Metalurh finished 10th out of 16 teams in Group 5. The team missed the next season, but returned for the 1996–97 Ukrainian Football Amateur League.

Just like 2 seasons before, Metalurh played in Group 5, but this time they placed 1st in the group. Hennadiy Vilihurin from Metalurh and Viktor Kuzyura (Avers Bakhmach) shared the top scorers title with 7 goals. Metalurh also played an additional game with Avers Bakhmach for 1st place in the group, since both teams were tied on points. Metalurh beat Avers in Kremenchuk 3:2 and qualified for the finals. The 1996–97 finals were held in Romny, Sumy Oblast. Metalurh were placed in one of the two groups, each of three teams. They placed last in the group and played against the team that placed last in the other group. Metalurh beat Pivdenstal Yenakieve 2:1. Nevertheless, all the final tournament participants were admitted to the next year's Second League competition (Third level).

In 1997, Metalurh was admitted to the professional competitions and made their debut in the 1997–98 Ukrainian Second League. The same year, they also made their first appearance in the Ukrainian Cup. In the away game on 14 July 1997, just a month after their game against Pivdenstal, Metalurh was eliminated by the Yenakieve team 3:1 in an away game of the 1997–98 Ukrainian Cup preliminary round. The only goal for Metalurh was scored by Vladyslav Solodyannykov. Their first appearance in the Second League, Metalurh made on 31 July 1997, when visiting FC Petrivtsi in Myrhorod, they lost 1:2. The first goal at professional level was scored by Hennadiy Vilihurin. Metalurh struggled from the very beginning earning 7 points in their first 10 match weeks. Their first win came about at match week 8, when they played Metalurh-2 Zaporizhia at home on 6 September and won 1:0. Metalurh ended the season at the bottom of the league in their group and were relegated.

In 1998, Metalurh returned to amateur competitions, but did not qualify for the final tournament. They placed 4th among 10 participants. In 1999, the amateur competitions shifted to the spring-fall season calendar. Metalurh once again did not qualify for the final tournament placing dead last in their group with only one win in the tournament.

== League and cup history ==
Season	Div.	Pos.	Pl.	W	D	L	GS	GA	P	Domestic Cup	Other	Notes
Metalurh Komsomolske
1994–95	4th "5"	10	30	12	5	13	32	48	41			
1995–96	Donetsk Oblast competitions											
1996–97	4th Stage 1 "5"	1	21	14	4	3	24	17	46			
1996–97	4th Final "B"	5	3	1	0	2	2	4	3			Admitted to SL
1997–98	3rd "C"	16	30	7	2	21	24	63	23	Preliminary round		Relegated
1998–99	4th Stage 1 "3"	4	18	9	4	5	16	14	31			
1999	4th Stage 1 "3"	6	10	1	2	7	11	24	5			
2000	4th Stage 1 "7"	4	6	0	3	3	2	17	3			
2001	4th Stage 1 "F"	4	6	1	0	5	4	27	3			
2002	Donetsk Oblast competitions											
2003	Donetsk Oblast competitions											
2004	4th Stage 1 "F"	3	6	2	2	2	6	4	8			
2004	4th Stage 2 "3"	4	8	2	1	5	7	14	7			
2004	4th Final "B"	4	3	0	0	3	1	11	0			
2005	4th Stage 1 "V"	4	8	2	2	4	9	12	8			
Hirnyk-Illichivets Komsomolske
2006	4th Stage 1 "4"	2	4	1	2	1	2	2	5			
2006	4th Stage 2 "4"	4	6	1	1	4	8	12	4			
