= Serhiy Serheyev =

Ukrainian footballer

Personal information
- Full name: Serhiy Oleksandrovych Serheyev
- Date of birth: 25 May 1982 (age 44)
- Place of birth: Budapest, Hungary
- Position: Midfielder

Senior career*
| Years | Team | Apps | (Gls) |
| 2000–2002 | Dynamo Lviv | 38 | (3) |
| 2002–2004 | Karpaty-2 Lviv | 62 | (2) |
| 2002 | Karpaty-3 Lviv | 1 | (0) |
| 2004 | Karpaty Lviv | 2 | (0) |
| 2005 | Hetman Zamość | | |
| 2005–2006 | Krasyliv | 22 | (2) |
| 2006 | Mykolaiv | 14 | (0) |
| 2007 | Halychyna Lviv | 3 | (1) |
| 2008 | Stal Dniprodzerzhynsk | 21 | (1) |
| 2009 | → Arsenal-Kyivshchyna Bila Tserkva (loan) | 1 | (0) |
| 2010–2011 | Beregvidek Berehove | | |
| 2012–2015 | Rukh Vynnyky | 43 | (7) |
| 2016–2018 | Ukraine United | 28 | (4) |
- * Club domestic league appearances and goals

Serhiy Oleksandrovych Serheyev (Ukrainian: Сергій Олександрович Сергеєв, born May 25, 1982) is a Ukrainian footballer.

== Playing career ==
Serheyev began his career in 2000 with FC Dynamo Lviv in the Ukrainian Second League. In 2002, he signed with FC Karpaty-2 Lviv of the Ukrainian First League, and made the senior team in 2004. Midway through the season he went abroad to Poland to sign with Hetman Zamość. In 2005, he returned to his native country to play with FC Krasyliv, and had stints with MFC Mykolaiv, FC Halychyna Lviv, FC Stal Kamianske, FC Arsenal-Kyivshchyna Bila Tserkva, SC Beregvidek Berehove, and FC Rukh Vynnyky. In 2016, he went overseas to Canada to sign with FC Ukraine United of the Canadian Soccer League. In his debut season he featured in 17 matches and recorded one goal, and helped Ukraine United clinch a postseason berth by finishing second in the standings.
