= Roman Pitsur =

Ukrainian footballer (born 1980)

Personal information
- Full name: Roman Mykhailovych Pitsur
- Date of birth: 7 November 1980 (age 46)
- Place of birth: Ukrainian SSR, Soviet Union
- Position: Forward

Senior career*
Years	Team	Apps	(Gls)
2000–2006	Hazovyk-Skala Stryi	110	(29)
2005–2006	→Krymteplytsia Molodizhne (loan)	16	(1)
2006–2007	Krymteplytsia Molodizhne	18	(3)
2006–2007	→Enerhetyk Burshtyn (loan)	12	(0)
2007–2008	Enerhetyk Burshtyn	0	(0)
2007–2008	→Stal Dniprodzerzhynsk (loan)	15	(0)
2008–2011	Arsenal Bila Tserkva	65	(22)
2017	Ukraine United	9	(2)
2021	Ukraine United		
- * Club domestic league appearances and goals

Roman Pitsur (born November 7, 1980) is a former Ukrainian footballer who played as a forward.

== Club career ==
=== Ukraine ===
Pitsur began his career in 2000 with FC Hazovyk-Skala Stryi in the Ukrainian Second League. In 2006, he played in the Ukrainian First League with Krymteplytsia Molodizhne.

In his second season with Krymteplytsia, he was loaned to Enerhetyk Burshtyn. After his two-year tenure in Crimea, he had a brief stint with Stal Dniprodzerzhynsk in 2008.

He returned to the Ukrainian third division in 2007 to sign with Arsenal Bila Tserkva, helping the club secure promotion in his debut season. He resigned with the club the following season as they competed in the second division. After three seasons with Arsenal, he left the club in the winter of 2011.

In 2013, he played in the Transcarpathian regional amateur circuit with FC Polyana and finished the season as the league's top goal scorer.

=== Canada ===
In the summer of 2017, he played abroad in the Canadian Soccer League's second division with Ukraine United. Pitsur helped the club achieve a perfect season, initially securing the divisional title. In the postseason opening match, he recorded a goal against Brantford Galaxy's reserve team, which helped advance the team to the championship final. He participated in the championship match against Burlington SC and contributed a goal to win the championship.

In 2021, he returned to play with Ukraine United in the Ontario Soccer League.

== Honors ==
FC Hazovyk-Skala Stryi

- Ukrainian Second League Group A: 2003–04

FC Ukraine United

- CSL II Championship: 2017
- Canadian Soccer League Second Division: 2017
