= Oleksandr Sobkovych =

Ukrainian footballer

Personal information
- Full name: Oleksandr Dmytrovych Sobkovych
- Date of birth: 11 February 1976 (age 50)
- Place of birth: Kyiv, Ukrainian SSR, Soviet Union
- Positions: Defender; midfielder

Senior career*
Years	Team	Apps	(Gls)
1992–1995	FC Dynamo-3 Kyiv	20	(0)
1994–1997	FC Dynamo-2 Kyiv	35	(0)
1996–1997	FC Hoverla Uzhhorod	5	(1)
1997–1998	FC CSKA Kyiv	4	(0)
1997–1998	→ FC CSKA-2 Kyiv	14	(1)
1997–1999	FC Metalurg Mariupol	19	(0)
1999–2000	FC Chornomorets Odesa	23	(1)
1999–2000	→ FC Chornomorets-2 Odesa	20	(20)
2000–2001	FC Sokil Zolochiv	28	(7)
2001–2003	FC Obolon Kyiv	18	(9)
2001–2003	→ FC Obolon-2 Kyiv	4	(2)
2003	FC Ordabasy	13	(1)
2003	FC Atyrau	12	(1)
2004	FC Astana-1964	33	(2)
2005	FC Ordabasy	11	(0)
2005–2006	FC Dnipro Cherkasy	1	(0)
2007–2008	FC Atyrau	45	(4)
2017–	FC Ukraine United	4	(1)
- * Club domestic league appearances and goals as of 6 December 2017

Oleksandr Sobkovych (born February 11, 1976) is a Ukrainian footballer who serves as a player-assistant coach for FC Ukraine United in the Canadian Soccer League.

== Career ==
Sobkovych began his career in 1992 with FC Dynamo-3 Kyiv in the Ukrainian Football Amateur League, and also played with FC Dynamo-2 Kyiv in the Ukrainian First League. He later had stints with FC Hoverla Uzhhorod, and FC CSKA Kyiv. In 1997, he played in the Ukrainian Premier League with FC Metalurg Mariupol. In 1998, he returned to the First League to play with FC Chornomorets Odesa, and spent some time in the Second League with FC Sokil Zolochiv in 2000. In 2002, he returned to the Premier League to play with FC Obolon Kyiv. In 2003, he went abroad to play in the Kazakhstan Premier League with FC Ordabasy.

Throughout his time in Kazakhstan he played with FC Atyrau, and FC Astana-1964. In 2005, he returned to Ukraine to play with FC Dnipro Cherkasy, and went abroad in 2017 to serve as player-assistant coach for FC Ukraine United in the Canadian Soccer League. In his debut season he assisted FC Ukraine in achieving a perfect season, and claimed the CSL Second Division Championship.
