= Nazar Lytvyn =

Ukrainian footballer

Personal information
- Full name: Nazar Zinovievich Lytvyn
- Date of birth: March 22, 1983 (age 43)
- Place of birth: Ukrainian SSR, Soviet Union
- Position: Goalkeeper

Youth career
- 1998–2000: FC Karpaty Lviv

Senior career*
Years	Team	Apps	(Gls)
2001	FC Karpaty-2 Lviv	5	(0)
2001	FC Karpaty-3 Lviv	2	(0)
2003–2006	FC Rava Rava-Ruska	76	(0)
2007	FC Lviv	0	(0)
2006	FC Sokil Sukhovolia	8	(0)
2007–2008	FC Halychyna Lviv	3	(0)
2009–2010	FC Arsenal-Kyivshchyna Bila Tserkva	40	(0)
2011–2013	FC Karpaty Kamianka-Buzka	40	(0)
2013–2014	FC Lapayivka	29	(0)
2015–2016	FC Bory Borynychi	16	(0)
2016–2017	FC Ukraine United	19	(0)
- * Club domestic league appearances and goals

Nazar Lytvyn (born March 22, 1983) is a Ukrainian footballer who played in the Ukrainian First League, Ukrainian Second League, and Canadian Soccer League

== Playing career ==
Lytvyn began his career in 1998 with FC Karpaty-2 Lviv in the Ukrainian Second League, and also played with FC Karpaty-3 Lviv. He later briefly played with FC Sokil Zolochiv before signing with FC Rava Rava-Ruska. During his tenure with Rava he captured the Druha Liha A championship in 2004. In 2006, he was transferred to FC Lviv of the Ukrainian First League, and signed with FC Halychyna Lviv in 2007. He later played with FC Arsenal-Kyivshchyna Bila Tserkva, and Karpaty Kamenka-Bug.

In 2016, he went overseas to Canada to sign with FC Ukraine United of the Canadian Soccer League. In his second season he assisted FC Ukraine in achieving a perfect season, and winning the Second Division Championship.

== Honors ==
=== FC Rava Rava-Ruska ===
- Ukrainian Second League: 2004-2005

=== FC Ukraine United ===
- CSL II Championship: 2017
