= Andriy Kondzyolka =

Ukrainian footballer

Personal information
- Full name: Andriy Vasylovych Kondzyolka
- Date of birth: 16 March 1983 (age 43)
- Place of birth: Ukrainian SSR, Soviet Union
- Position: Defender

Senior career*
Years	Team	Apps	(Gls)
2002	FC Ternopil Nyva-2	7	(0)
2012–2016	FC Ternopil	116	(5)
2017	FC Ukraine United		
- * Club domestic league appearances and goals as of 10 November 2018

Andriy Kondzyolka (born March 16, 1983) is a Ukrainian footballer.

== Career ==
Kondzyolka began his career in 2002 with FC Ternopil Nyva-2 in the Ukrainian Second League. In 2012, he played with FC Ternopil, and secured a promotion to the Ukrainian First League in 2014. In 2017, he played abroad in the Canadian Soccer League with FC Ukraine United. In his debut season he assisted FC Ukraine in achieving a perfect season, and claimed the CSL Second Division Championship.
