= Yuri Sokolovsky =

Ukrainian footballer

Personal information
- Full name: Yuri Vasylovych Sokolovsky
- Date of birth: 11 April 1995 (age 31)
- Place of birth: Zboriv Raion, Ukraine
- Position: Defender

Senior career*
Years	Team	Apps	(Gls)
2012–2016	FC Ternopil	67	(0)
2017–2019	FC Ukraine United	11	(1)
- * Club domestic league appearances and goals as of 6 December 2017

Yuri Sokolovsky (born 11 April 1995) is a Ukrainian footballer who plays as a defender.

== Career ==
Sokolovsky began his career in 2012 with FC Ternopil in the Ukrainian Second League. In 2014, he played in the Ukrainian First League after FC Ternopil secured a promotion in 2014. In 2017, he played abroad in the Canadian Soccer League with FC Vorkuta. In his debut season he assisted FC Ukraine in achieving a perfect season, and claimed the CSL Second Division Championship. While in his sophomore year he assisted in securing the First Division title.
