= FC Slovkhlib Slovyansk =

FC Slovkhlib Slovyansk (Ukrainian: «Словхліб» (Слов'янськ)) was a Ukrainian football club from Sloviansk, Donetsk Oblast. Slovkhlib played at Khimik Stadium with capacity of 2,226 seats. The club was founded in 1999 and participated in the regional competitions.

In 2013, the club was disbanded after its main sponsor, the local Sloviansk bakery, stopped supporting them. The bakery belonged to Yuriy Ivanyushchenko.

== See also ==
- SC Dynamo Sloviansk
- Football Federation of Donetsk Oblast
- Yuriy Ivanyushchenko
