= FC Portovyk Illichivsk =

- Full name: FC Portovyk Illichivsk
- Nickname: Energiya
- Founded: 1962; 64 years ago
- Dissolved: 2002; 24 years ago
- Ground: Portovik stadium
- Capacity: 1,500

FC Portovyk Illichivsk (previously known as Illichivsk) was a Ukrainian football club from Chornomorsk, Odessa Oblast. Founded in 1962 and disbanded in 2002.

== Stadium ==
Their home stadium was Portovik stadium; it had a capacity of 1500 seats.

== League and cup history ==
Season	Div.	Pos.	Pl.	W	D	L	GS	GA	P	Domestic Cup	Europe	Notes

== Achievements ==
- Ukrainian Amateur Football Championship: 1994-95
