= 1997–98 Ukrainian Football Amateur League =

Ukrainian Football Amateur League
- Season: 1997–98
- Champions: Enerhetyk Burshtyn (1st title) Dalis Komyshuvakha (losing finalist)

1997–98 Amateur championship of Ukraine was the sixth amateur championship of Ukraine and the 34th since the establishment of championship among fitness clubs (KFK) in 1964.

Due to the mass withdrawal of teams during the last season, number of groups was reduced to four.

== Teams ==
=== Location map ===
Locations of team home grounds in the 1994-95 Ukrainian Championship among amateur teams

== First stage ==
=== Group 1 ===
Pos	Team	Pld	W	D	L	GF	GA	GD	Pts	Qualification
1	Enerhetyk Burshtyn	8	6	2	0	10	3	+7	20	Finals
2	Promin Sambir	8	5	2	1	12	10	+2	17	Finals
3	Nyva Terebovlia	8	3	2	3	7	7	0	11	
4	Sokil Radyvyliv	8	1	1	6	5	8	−3	4	withdrew
5	Verkhovyna Mizhhiria	8	0	1	7	4	10	−6	1	withdrew

=== Group 2 ===
Pos	Team	Pld	W	D	L	GF	GA	GD	Pts	Qualification
1	Zoria Khorostkiv	14	10	3	1	31	4	+27	33	withdrew
2	Interkas Kyiv	14	8	3	3	16	9	+7	27	Finals
3	Refryzhyrator Fastiv	14	8	2	4	14	18	−4	26	
4	UFEI Irpin	14	7	1	6	12	11	+1	22	
5	Khimik Rivne	14	6	2	6	10	21	−11	20	
6	KKhP Cherniakhiv	14	5	3	6	25	15	+10	18	
7	Volyn-2 Lutsk	14	4	1	9	6	15	−9	13	
8	Kolos-Tekstylnyk Dunayivtsi	14	0	1	13	4	25	−21	1	withdrew

=== Group 3 ===
Pos	Team	Pld	W	D	L	GF	GA	GD	Pts	Qualification
1	Kharchovyk Popivka	14	9	3	2	22	9	+13	30	Finals
2	Krystal Parkhomivka	14	9	2	3	17	8	+9	29	Finals
3	Domobudivnyk Chernihiv	14	8	1	5	16	8	+8	25	
4	Lokomotyv Znamianka	14	6	3	5	14	17	−3	21	
5	Zirka Smila	14	6	3	5	12	17	−5	21	
6	Pervomaisk	14	4	5	5	11	15	−4	17	
7	Zoria Uman	14	2	2	10	3	14	−11	8	withdrew
8	Rybka Cherkasy	14	2	1	11	7	14	−7	7	withdrew

=== Group 4 ===
Pos	Team	Pld	W	D	L	GF	GA	GD	Pts	Qualification
1	Dalis Kamyshuvakha	14	11	2	1	24	6	+18	35	Finals
2	Shakhta Ukrayina Ukrayinsk	14	10	1	3	26	14	+12	31	withdrew
3	Shakhtar Horlivka	14	9	1	4	20	14	+6	28	Finals
4	Enerhetyk Komsomolske	14	7	1	6	15	20	−5	22	
5	Shakhtar-Prohres Torez	14	7	1	6	16	21	−5	22	
6	Khartsyzk	14	3	0	11	10	10	0	9	withdrew
7	Hirnyk Torez	14	2	1	11	10	12	−2	7	withdrew
8	Shakhtar Krasnodon	14	2	1	11	2	26	−24	7	
9	Dynamo Saky	0	0	0	0	0	0	0	0	withdrew

== Finals ==
The second stage was finals that took place in Burshtyn, Ivano-Frankivsk Oblast.

=== Group A ===
Pos	Team	Pld	W	D	L	GF	GA	GD	Pts	Qualification
1	Enerhetyk Burshtyn (C)	3	3	0	0	7	1	+6	9	Final game
2	Shakhtar Horlivka	3	2	0	1	2	1	+1	6	
3	Kharchovyk Popivka	3	1	0	2	3	6	−3	3	
3	Interkas Kyiv	3	0	0	3	2	6	−4	0	

(C) Champions

=== Group B ===
Pos	Team	Pld	W	D	L	GF	GA	GD	Pts	Qualification
1	Dalis Kamyshuvakha (C)	2	1	1	0	2	1	+1	4	Final game
2	Krystal Parkhomivka	2	1	1	0	2	1	+1	4	
3	Promin Sambir	2	0	0	2	0	2	−2	0	
3	Zoria Khorostkiv	0	0	0	0	0	0	0	0	Withdrew

(C) Champions

=== Championship play-offs ===
1st place

Team 1	Score	Team 2
Enerhetyk Burshtyn	1–0	Dalis Komyshuvakha

3rd place

Team 1	Score	Team 2
Krystal Parkhomivka	3–1	Shakhtar Horlivka

5th place

Team 1	Score	Team 2
Kharchovyk Popivka	1–0	Promin Sambir

== Promotion play-off ==
Team 1	Agg.	Team 2	1st leg	2nd leg
FC Tysmenytsia	4–1	Promin Sambir	3–1	1–1
Hirnyk Pavlohrad	w/o	Shakhtar Horlivka	1–2	-:+
Zirka-2 Kirovohrad	w/o	Kharchovyk Popivka	+:-	

== Promotions ==
For the 1998–99 Ukrainian Second League were promoted FC Enerhetyk Burshtyn (champion), FC Dalis Komyshuvakha (runner-up), FC Shakhtar Horlivka (play-off winner). Before the start of next season Dalis Komyshuvakha withdrew.

Besides the Amateur League's teams to the Second League also were admitted some other teams.

== Number of teams by region ==
Number	Region	Team(s)
5	Donetsk Oblast	Hirnyk Torez, FC Khartsyzk, Shakhtar Horlivka, Shakhtar-Prohres Torez, Shakhta Ukraina Ukrainsk
3	Cherkasy Oblast	Rybka Cherkasy, Zirka Smila, Zorya Uman
2	Kharkiv Oblast	Enerhetyk Komsomolske, Krystal Parkhomivka
2	Kyiv Oblast	Refryzherator Fastiv, UFEI Irpin
2	Rivne Oblast	Khimik Rivne, Sokil Radyvyliv
2	Ternopil Oblast	Nyva Terebovlia, Zorya Khorostkiv
1	Autonomous Republic of Crimea	Dynamo Saky
1	Chernihiv Oblast	Domobudivnyk Chernihiv
1	Khmelnytskyi Oblast	Kolos-Tekstylnyk Dunaivtsi
1	Kirovohrad Oblast	Lokomotyv Znamianka
1	Kyiv	Inkeras
1	Luhansk Oblast	Shakhtar Krasnodon
1	Lviv Oblast	Promin Sambir
1	Mykolaiv Oblast	SC Pervomaisk
1	Sumy Oblast	Kharchovyk Popivka
1	Volyn Oblast	Volyn-2 Lutsk
1	Zakarpattia Oblast	Verkhovyna Mizhhiria
1	Zaporizhia Oblast	Dalis Kamyshuvakha
1	Zhytomyr Oblast	KKhP Chernyakhiv
