= Sergey Semenov (footballer) =

Ukrainian footballer

Personal information
- Full name: Sergey Vasylovych Semenov
- Date of birth: January 4, 1985 (age 41)
- Place of birth: Osokorivka, Ukraine SSR, Soviet Union
- Position: Midfielder

Senior career*
Years	Team	Apps	(Gls)
2004–2005	SC Tavriya Simferopol	0	(0)
2005–2006	MFC Zhytomyr	6	(0)
2006	NAPCS-Dynamo Simferopol		
2016–2017	FC Ukraine United		
2021–	FC Ukraine United		
- * Club domestic league appearances and goals as of December 11, 2018

Sergey Semenov (born January 4, 1985) is a Ukrainian footballer who plays in the Ontario Soccer League with FC Ukraine United.

== Playing career ==
Semenov began his career with SC Tavriya Simferopol in 2004 in the Vyshcha Liha Reserves, appearing in 18 matches and recording 1 goal. The following season he played in the Ukrainian Second League with MFC Zhytomyr, and played with NAPCS-Dynamo Simferopol in 2006. In 2016, he went abroad to play with FC Ukraine United in the Canadian Soccer League. In his second season he assisted FC Ukraine in achieving a perfect season, and winning the Second Division Championship. He played in the Ontario Soccer League in 2021 with Ukraine United.
