= FC Berkut Bedevlia =

Association football team from Ukraine

FC Berkut Bedevila
- Full name: FC Berkut Bedevlia
- League: Ukrainian Second League

FC Berkut Bedevlia is an amateur Ukrainian football club from Tyachiv Raion, Zakarpattia Oblast.

As of 2018, the club plays in the Regional championships of Ukraine under the purview of the Zakarpattia Football Association.

== League and cup history ==
Season	Div.	Pos.	Pl.	W	D	L	GS	GA	P	Domestic Cup	Europe	Notes
