= FC Avers Bakhmach =

Ukrainian football club, Bakhmach, Chernihiv Oblast (1996–1998)

- Full name: FC Avers Bakhmach
- Dissolved: 1997

FC Avers Bakhmach was a Ukrainian football club from Bakhmach, Chernihiv Oblast.

== League and cup history ==
Season	Div.	Pos.	Pl.	W	D	L	GS	GA	P	Domestic Cup	Notes
1996–97	4th	2	20	13	4	3	21	15	43		Group 5
1997–98	3rd "C"	17	34	9	11	14	29	43	38	3rd round	Group C
