= Beregvidek Berehove =

Ukrainian football club

SC Beregvidek Berehove is an amateur Ukrainian football club from Berehove, Zakarpattia Oblast. Berehvydeyk plays at Druzhba Stadium.

== History ==
The club was founded in 1930 in Czechoslovakia as Beregszászi Futball és Tenisz Club (BFTC) and participates in the Hungarian regional competitions. After World War II and annexation of the Carpathian region by the Soviet Union, BFTC was renamed as Verkhovina Beregovo in 1945 and participated in the Soviet republican competitions in Ukraine. In 1946 it was named as Bolshevik Beregovo and under the name played until 1951 when it changed its name to Kolkhoznik Beregovo. In 1962 the club changed its name again now to Kooperator Beregovo and in 1989 – to Druzhba Beregovo.

After fall of the Soviet Union, in 1996 the club was renamed as Vizhybu and in 1998 – Linet. From 2002 to 2007 the club was named simply as SC Berehove and then changed to Beregvidek Berehove.
