= FC Sambir =

Football club from Sambor, Ukraine

FC Sambir (previously known as FC Promin Sambir) is a Ukrainian football club from Sambir, Lviv Oblast. The club was established in the village of Volia-Baranetska, Sambir Raion, but later moved to the district centre.

Before 1992, there also existed another club Spartak Sambir.

== League and cup history ==
Season	Div.	Pos.	Pl.	W	D	L	GS	GA	P	Domestic Cup	Europe	Notes
1992	3	16	16	1	7	8	22	28	9			Relegated
1992–93	3B	10	34	14	4	16	46	43	32			
1993–94	3B	14	34	12	4	18	32	48	28			Relegated
1994–95	4	4	24	11	8	5	33	23	41			
1995–96										Q1 round		
1996–97	4	2	12	5	3	4	11	12	18			
1997–98	4	2	8	5	2	1	12	10	17			to Finals
1997–98	4	3	2	0	0	2	0	2	0			lost promotion play-off to Tysmenytsia
2011	4	1	12	8	3	1	24	5	27			to Finals
2011	4	2	3	1	2	0	3	2	5			

== Players ==
As of 8 September 2021

Note: Flags indicate national team as defined under FIFA eligibility rules; some limited exceptions apply. Players may hold more than one non-FIFA nationality.

No. / Pos. / Nation / Player	No. / Pos. / Nation / Player; — / MF / UKR / Ostap Malashevskyi

== Gallery ==
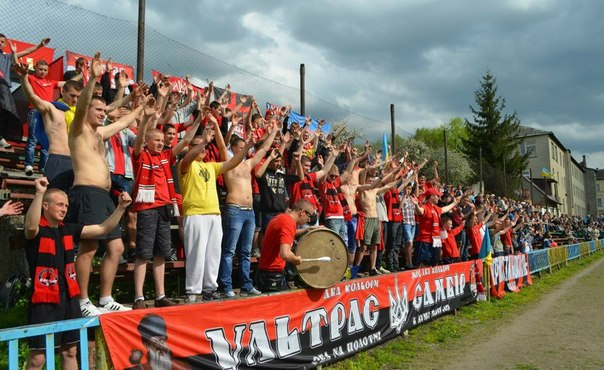
Sambir's ultras (2016)

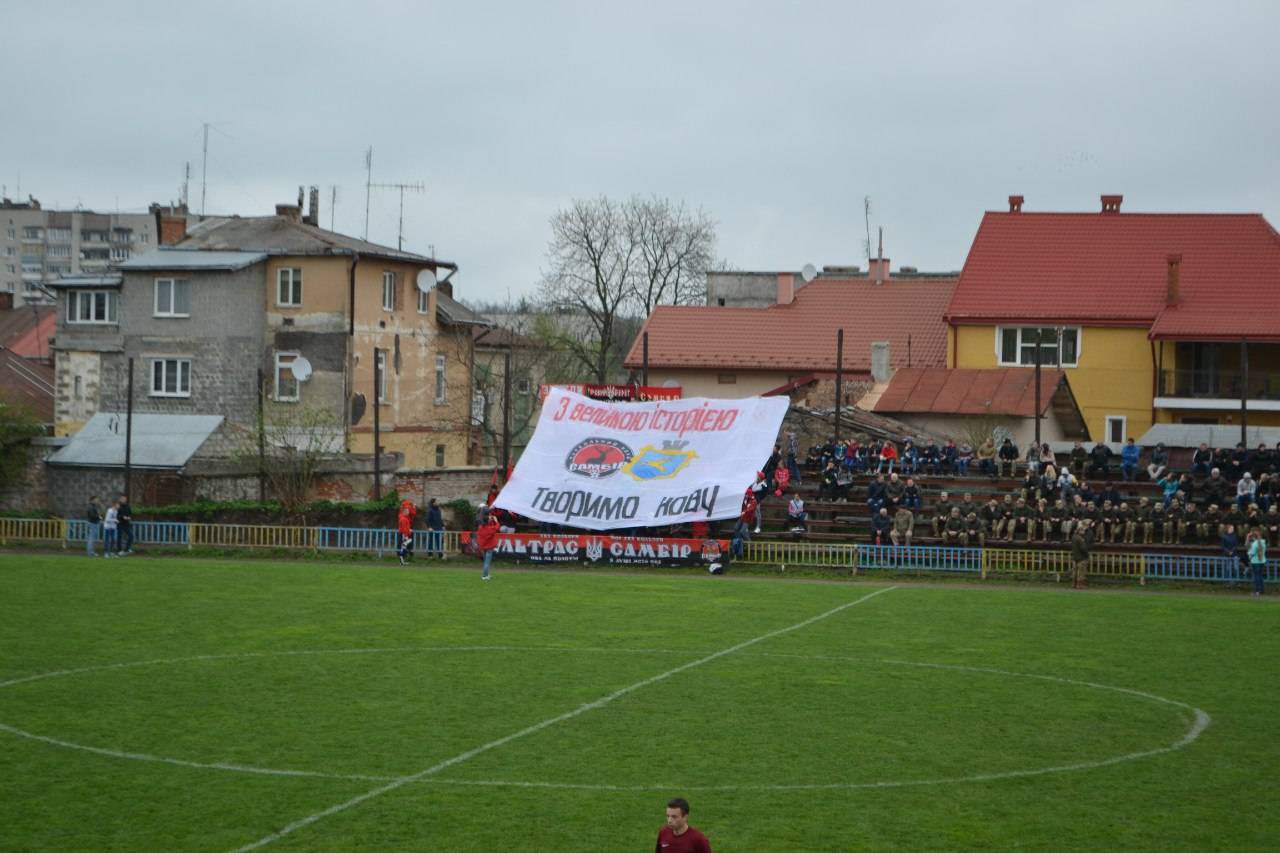
Ultras at Dnister Stadium (2016)

== See also ==
- FC Nyva Ternopil
