= Edmond Amadeo =

South Sudanese footballer (born 1989)

Personal information
- Full name: Edmond Amadeo Badal
- Date of birth: July 15, 1989 (age 37)
- Place of birth: Khartoum, Sudan
- Position: Defender

Team information
- Current team: Scarborough SC

Senior career*
Years	Team	Apps	(Gls)
2009–2010	Athletic Club of BC		
2010–2013	Al Safa		
2013–2014	Viitorul Caransebeș		
2015	FC Tigers Vancouver		
2016	Al-Hilal		
2017	Gudele FC		
2018–2019	SC Real Mississauga		
2023–	Scarborough SC		

International career
2013–2016	South Sudan	4	(0)
- * Club domestic league appearances and goals

Edmond Amadeo (born July 15, 1989) is a South Sudanese footballer who plays as a defender for Scarborough SC.

== Club career ==
=== Abroad ===
Amadeo initially played abroad in the Middle East with Saudi Arabia's Al Safa FC. In 2013, he played in the Romanian circuit for FC Caransebes.

=== Canada ===
His initial run in Canada occurred in 2009 when he played with the Athletic Club of BC.

In the spring of 2014, Amadeo returned to Canada for a trial run with the Ottawa Fury in the North American Soccer League. Ultimately, he would fail to secure a contract with Ottawa. Following his trial run in the country's capital, he went to the West Coast to play in the regional Pacific Coast Soccer League with FC Tigers Vancouver.

=== South Sudan ===
After a stint abroad in Canada, he played in his country's South Sudan Football Championship for Al-Hilal FC. In 2017, he played with league rivals Gudele FC.

=== Return to Canada ===
In the summer of 2018, he played in the Canadian Soccer League with expansion side SC Real Mississauga. In his debut season with Mississauga, he assisted the club by securing a playoff berth by finishing seventh in the league's first division. The club would be eliminated in the opening round of the playoffs by FC Vorkuta. Amadeo re-signed with Mississauga for the 2019 season.

In 2023, he returned to the CSL circuit to sign with Scarborough SC. He would record his first goal for the eastern Toronto side on September 9, 2023, against Ooty Black Pearl. Amadeo would help the club win the regular-season title. He re-signed with Scarborough for the 2024 season. Amadeo participated in the Royal CSL Cup final, where the Serbian White Eagles defeated them. Throughout the regular season, the club finished as runners-up to the Serbs.

Amadeo helped Scarborough win the league double in 2025.

== International career ==
Amadeo was selected to represent the South Sudan national football team in the 2013 CECAFA Cup. He made his debut for the national team on November 27, 2013, against Zanzibar. He made another appearance in the regional tournament against Kenya, coming on as a substitute. Amadeo would also play against Ethiopia in the final match of the group stage.

He returned to the international scene to participate in the 2017 Africa Cup of Nations qualification in a qualifier match against Mali. He would feature in the match against Mali, where South Sudan was eliminated from contention.

== Managerial career ==
In 2025, he transitioned to the managerial side by being named an assistant/player coach for Scarborough SC.

== Honours ==
Scarborough SC

- CSL Championship: 2025
- Canadian Soccer League Regular Season: 2023, 2025
- Canadian Soccer League Royal CSL Cup runner-up: 2024
