= Robert Boskovic =

Canadian soccer player (born 1998)

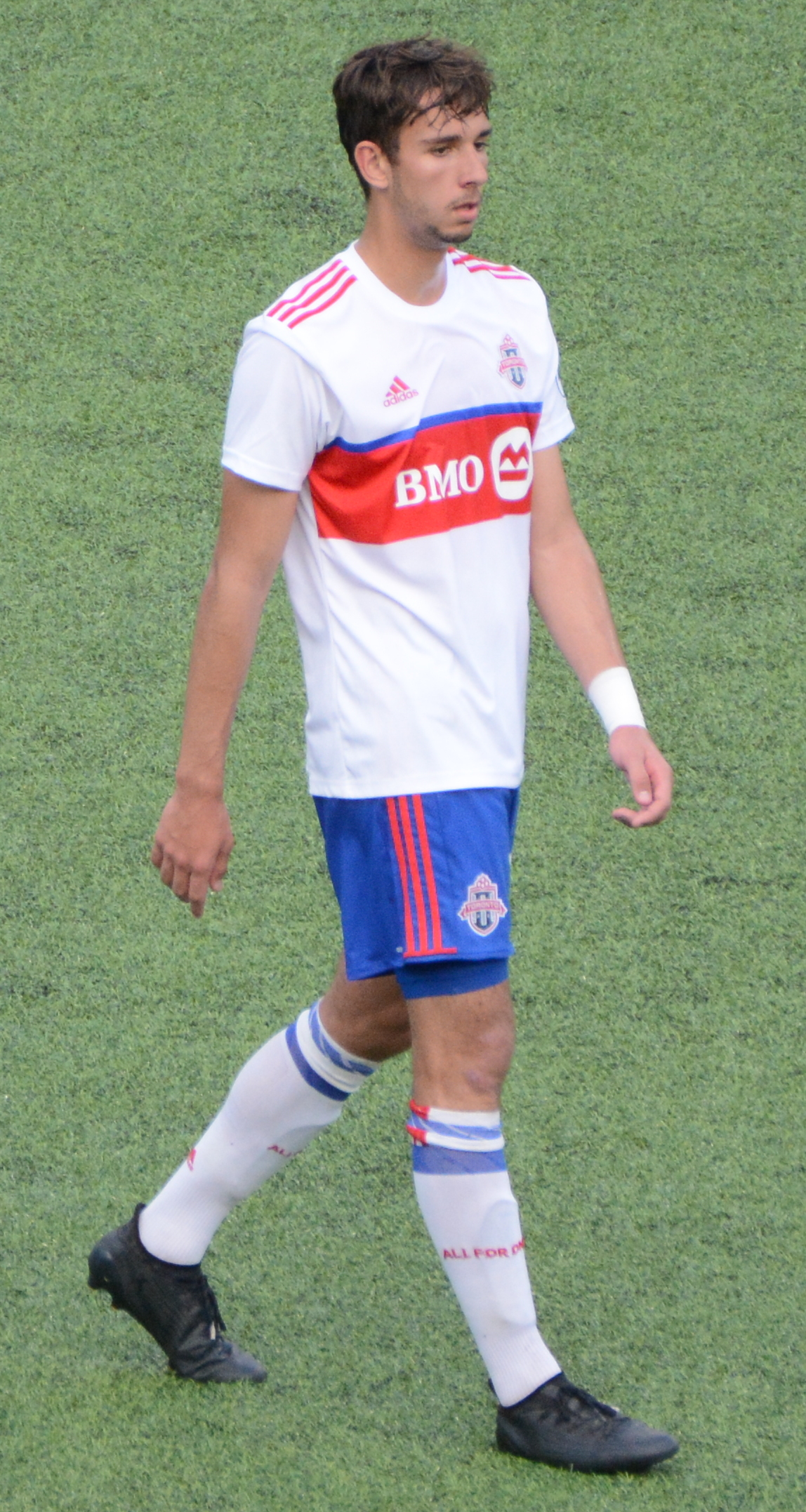
- Boskovic with Toronto FC II in 2017

Personal information
- Full name: Robert Boskovic
- Date of birth: July 1, 1998 (age 28)
- Place of birth: Mississauga, Ontario, Canada
- Height: 1.90 m (6 ft 3 in)
- Position: Centre-back

Team information
- Current team: Serbian White Eagles

Youth career
- Mississauga SC
- West Toronto Cobras
- Toronto FC

College career
Years	Team	Apps	(Gls)
2016–2017	Ryerson Rams	27	(2)

Senior career*
Years	Team	Apps	(Gls)
2016–2018	Toronto FC III	8	(2)
2015–2020	Toronto FC II	55	(1)
2019	→ Ottawa Fury (loan)	9	(0)
2020	→ Cavalry FC (loan)	6	(0)
2021	Pacific FC	5	(0)
2024–	Serbian White Eagles		
- * Club domestic league appearances and goals as of May 31, 2024

Robert Boskovic (born July 1, 1998) is a Canadian professional soccer player who plays as a centre-back with the Serbian White Eagles in the Canadian Soccer League.

== University career ==
Boskovic played collegiately with the Ryerson Rams. In 2016, he won the Lou Bilek Award as U Sports Rookie of the Year becoming the first Ryerson player to do so since its inception in 1999.

== Club career ==
=== Toronto FC II ===
Boskovic made his USL debut on August 15, 2015, against the Richmond Kickers. Boskovic made three appearances for Toronto FC II during the 2015 USL season, after being rewarded with a call-up from the TFC Academy. On August 1, 2015, he made his professional debut when coming off the bench in a 2–1 victory over Richmond Kickers. He soon followed up with a second cameo appearance in 3–2 win over FC Montreal. Boskovic made his first start later that season, in a 4–1 defeat to Charlotte Independence on September 9, 2015.

Boskovic remains on loan with affiliate club Toronto FC II ahead of the 2016 USL season. Boskovic becomes the 36th player to sign professionally with Toronto FC II on March 15, 2018. He was released by TFC II on December 23, 2020.

==== Ottawa Fury (loan) ====
On March 6, 2019, it was announced that Boskovic would be loaned to USL Championship club Ottawa Fury FC for the 2019 season. He made nine league appearances that season and appeared in Ottawa's playoff series against Charleston Battery.

==== Cavalry FC (loan) ====
On March 11, 2020, Boskovic re-signed with Toronto and was subsequently loaned to Canadian Premier League side Cavalry FC for the 2020 season. He made his debut for Cavalry on August 16 against Valour FC.

=== Pacific FC ===
On August 10, 2021, he signed with Pacific FC of the Canadian Premier League. After the 2021 season, he left the club.

=== Serbian White Eagles ===
Boskovic signed with the Serbian White Eagles before the 2024 season and participated in the Royal CSL Cup. In the early stage of the season, he helped the Serbs win the Royal CSL Cup against Scarborough SC. Throughout the season, the Serbs would secure the regular-season title. In 2025, he helped the Serbs secure a playoff berth by finishing second in the standings. In the playoffs, the Serbs qualified for the championship finals, where Scarborough defeated them.

== International career ==
Boskovic was named to the Canadian U-23 provisional roster for the 2020 CONCACAF Men's Olympic Qualifying Championship on February 26, 2020.

== Honours ==
=== Club ===
Pacific FC

- Canadian Premier League: 2021

Serbian White Eagles

- Canadian Soccer League Regular Season: 2024
- Canadian Soccer League Royal CSL Cup: 2024
- Canadian Soccer League Regular Season runner-up: 2025

== Career statistics ==
As of September 16, 2020

Club	Season	League	League		Playoffs		Canadian Championship		Total	
Club	Season	League	Apps	Goals	Apps	Goals	Apps	Goals	Apps	Goals
Toronto FC III	2016	PDL	3	1	—		—		3	1
Toronto FC III	2017	League1 Ontario	4	1	0	0	—		4	1
Toronto FC III	2018	League1 Ontario	1	0	—		—		1	0
Toronto FC III	Total		8	2	0	0	0	0	8	2
Toronto FC II	2015	USL	8	2	—		—		8	2
Toronto FC II	2016	USL	12	0	—		—		12	0
Toronto FC II	2017	USL	10	0	—		—		10	0
Toronto FC II	2018	USL	30	1	—		—		30	1
Toronto FC II	Total		55	1	0	0	0	0	55	1
Ottawa Fury (loan)	2019	USL Championship	9	0	1	0	0	0	10	0
Cavalry FC (loan)	2020	Canadian Premier League	6	0	—		—		6	0
Career Total			78	3	1	0	0	0	79	3
