= Srđan Simović =

Serbian footballer (born 1985)

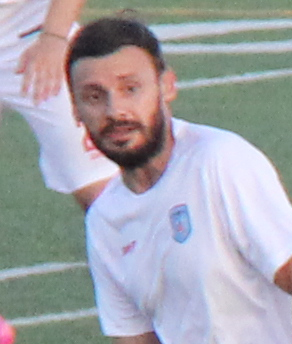
- Simović in 2022

Personal information
- Full name: Srđan Simović
- Date of birth: 17 July 1985 (age 41)
- Place of birth: Čačak, SFR Yugoslavia
- Height: 1.85 m (6 ft 1 in)
- Positions: Left wing; left-back

Team information
- Current team: Serbian White Eagles
- Number: 3

Senior career*
Years	Team	Apps	(Gls)
2003–2004	Javor Ivanjica	0	(0)
2004–2005	Takovo	14	(0)
2005–2006	Jedinstvo Ub	33	(4)
2006–2007	Mladost Apatin	23	(0)
2007–2008	Voždovac	21	(0)
2008–2012	Metalac Gornji Milanovac	112	(18)
2012–2013	Radnički Kragujevac	24	(1)
2014	Metalac Gornji Milanovac	5	(0)
2014	Radnik Surdulica	13	(4)
2015	Javor Ivanjica	14	(1)
2016–2018	Metalac Gornji Milanovac	62	(0)
2018–2019	Sloga Požega		
2019	Takovo		
2019–2020	Borac Čačak		
2020–2021	Ulaanbaatar City		
2022–	Serbian White Eagles		
- * Club domestic league appearances and goals

Srđan Simović (Serbian Cyrillic: Срђан Симовић; born 17 July 1985) is a Serbian footballer who plays for Canadian Soccer League club Serbian White Eagles FC.

== Career ==
=== Superliga ===
Simović played various times in Serbia's top-tier league initially with Mladost Apatin for the 2006-07 season. He continued playing in the country's SuperLiga with Metalac Gornji Milanovac, where he had several different stints with the club. He left Metalac in 2012, where he received offers from abroad. Ultimately, he remained in Serbia by signing with Radnički 1923. After a season with Radnički, he returned to Metalac.

In 2015, he signed with Javor Ivanjica and left the club once the season concluded. Following his departure from Javor, he rejoined Metalac in 2016 for his final run with the club.

=== Mongolia ===
In January 2020, Simović joined Ulaanbaatar City in Mongolia under the newly hired Serbian coach Vojislav Bralušić.

=== Canada ===
In the summer of 2022, he played abroad in the Canadian Soccer League with the Serbian White Eagles. He helped the Serbs secure the regular-season title, which included a playoff berth. In the second round of the postseason, he played against FC Continentals, where the Serbs were eliminated from the competition.

Simović re-signed with the Serbs for the 2023 season, where he participated in the Royal CSL Cup final, which Toronto Falcons defeated the White Eagles in a penalty shootout. The Serbs would finish the 2023 campaign as runners-up to Scarborough SC in the regular season.

He returned for his third season and helped Serbia win the Royal CSL Cup against Scarborough. He also contributed to securing the 2024 regular-season title. In 2025, he helped the Serbs win their second Royal CSL Cup.

== Honours ==
Radnik Surdulica

- Serbian First League: 2014–15

Serbian White Eagles

- Canadian Soccer League Regular Season: 2022, 2024
- Canadian Soccer League Royal CSL Cup: 2024, 2025
- Canadian Soccer League Royal CSL Cup runner-up: 2023
