= Dejan Koraksić =

Serbian footballer (born 1997)

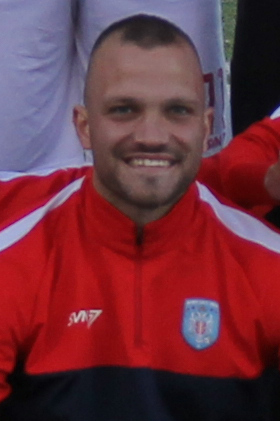
- Koraksić in 2024

Personal information
- Date of birth: 25 December 1997 (age 28)
- Place of birth: Čačak, FR Yugoslavia
- Height: 1.76 m (5 ft 9 in)
- Position: Left-back

Team information
- Current team: Serbian White Eagles

Youth career
- BIP Čačak
- Sloboda Čačak
- 2014: Bambi Kraljevo
- 2014–2015: Novi Pazar
- 2015–2016: Metalac Gornji Milanovac

Senior career*
Years	Team	Apps	(Gls)
2013–2014	Sloboda Čačak	6	(0)
2014–2015	Novi Pazar	0	(0)
2016–2020	Metalac Gornji Milanovac	72	(2)
2020	→ Novi Pazar (loan)	4	(0)
2020	Radnik Bijeljina	16	(0)
2020–2021	Blansko	7	(0)
2021–2022	Borac Čačak		
2022	Smederevo 1924		
2022–	Serbian White Eagles		
- * Club domestic league appearances and goals

Dejan Koraksić (Serbian Cyrillic: Дејан Кораксић; born 25 December 1997) is a Serbian professional footballer who plays as a left-back for Canadian Soccer League club Serbian White Eagles FC.

== Club career ==
=== Early years ===
Born in Čačak, Koraksić started his career with local club BIP. Later he moved to Sloboda Čačak where he made his debut as a senior, making 6 appearances during the 2013–14 Serbian League West season. Koraksić also spent some period playing with the youth academy of Bambi Kraljevo before joining Novi Pazar where he appeared as a left-back for the club's youth team in the 2014–15 season.

=== Metalac Gornji Milanovac ===
In the summer of 2015, Koraksić officially joined Metalac Gornji Milanovac. The whole first season playing with the new club, he spent with the youth team, but was also licensed with the first team. After he overgrown the youth categories in 2016, Koraksić spent the summer pre-season with the first team and later started the 2016–17 Serbian SuperLiga season as a full senior player. He made his professional debut for Metalac in a league game against Rad, played on 5 November 2016.

In January 2020, he was loaned out to Novi Pazar for the remainder of the season.

=== Radnik Bijeljina ===
On 20 July 2020, Bosnian Premier League club Radnik Bijeljina announced the signing of Koraksić. He made his official debut for Radnik in a league game against Sloboda Tuzla on 1 August 2020. Only five months later, in December 2020, Koraksić left the club.

=== Blansko ===
Following his departure from Bosnia, he secured a deal in the Czech Republic's National Football League with FK Blansko for the remainder of the season. He made his debut for the club on March 13, 2021, against SK Líšeň. In total, he would appear in 7 matches for Blansko.

=== Serbia ===
After the conclusion of his tenure in the Czech Republic, he returned to Serbia to play in the country's third-tier league with Borac Cacak, where he served as the team captain. For the 2022 season, he signed with league rivals FK Smederevo 1924.

=== Canada ===
In the summer of 2022, he played abroad in the Canadian Soccer League with the Serbian White Eagles. He helped the Serbs in securing the regular-season title, including a playoff berth. The Serbs would finish the 2023 campaign as runners-up to Scarborough SC in the regular season.

Koraksić returned for his third season and helped Serbia win the Royal CSL Cup against Scarborough. He also contributed to securing the 2024 regular-season title. In 2025, he helped the Serbs win their second Royal CSL Cup.

== Career statistics ==
=== Club ===
As of match played 29 November 2020.

Club	Season	League			Cup		Continental		Other		Total	
Club	Season	Division	Apps	Goals	Apps	Goals	Apps	Goals	Apps	Goals	Apps	Goals
Sloboda Čačak	2013–14	Serbian League West	6	0	—		—		—		6	0
Novi Pazar	2014–15	Serbian SuperLiga	0	0	0	0	—		—		0	0
Metalac Gornji Milanovac	2015–16	Serbian SuperLiga	0	0	0	0	—		—		0	0
Metalac Gornji Milanovac	2016–17	Serbian SuperLiga	5	0	0	0	—		—		5	0
Metalac Gornji Milanovac	2017–18	Serbian First League	16	1	0	0	—		—		16	1
Metalac Gornji Milanovac	2018–19	Serbian First League	33	1	1	0	—		—		34	1
Metalac Gornji Milanovac	2019–20	Serbian First League	18	0	1	0	—		—		19	0
Metalac Gornji Milanovac	Total		72	2	2	0	—		—		74	2
Novi Pazar (loan)	2019–20	Serbian First League	4	0	—		—		—		4	0
Radnik Bijeljina	2020–21	Bosnian Premier League	16	0	0	0	—		—		16	0
Career total			98	2	2	0	—		—		100	2

== Honours ==
Serbian White Eagles

- Canadian Soccer League Regular Season: 2022, 2024
- Canadian Soccer League Royal CSL Cup: 2024, 2025
