= Gregor Žugelj =

Slovenian footballer (born 1991)

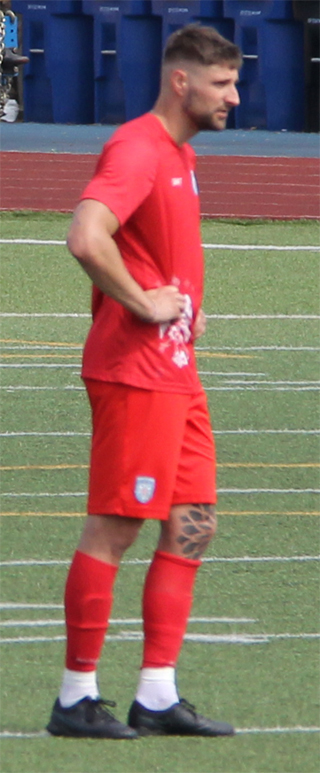
- Žugelj in 2025

Personal information
- Date of birth: 2 September 1991 (age 35)
- Place of birth: Ljubljana, Slovenia
- Height: 1.91 m (6 ft 3 in)
- Position: Midfielder

Team information
- Current team: Serbian White Eagles

Youth career
- –2009: Olimpija

Senior career*
Years	Team	Apps	(Gls)
2009–2012	Olimpija	0	(0)
2010–2011	→ Kamnik (loan)	17	(2)
2011–2012	→ Bela Krajina (loan)	24	(2)
2012–2013	Bela Krajina	35	(1)
2014	Krka	10	(0)
2015	SV St. Margarethen/Rosental	16	(3)
2016–2017	Kolpa	21	(6)
2017–2018	Croatia AC (indoor)		
2018–2019	Waterloo		
2021	St. Catharines Hrvat		(4)
2023–2024	Hamilton City		
2025–	Serbian White Eagles		
- * Club domestic league appearances and goals

Gregor Žugelj (born 2 September 1991) is a Slovenian footballer who plays as a midfielder for Canadian Soccer League club Serbian White Eagles.

== Career ==
=== Slovenia ===
Žugelj began his professional career in 2009 in the Slovenian PrvaLiga with Olimpija Ljubljana. He would later be loaned out to the lower tiers to receive playing time. Initially, he was loaned to the Slovenian Third League to play for NK Kamnik in 2010. He received a second loan spell with NK Bela Krajina in the Slovenian Second League, and consequently signed a permanent deal in 2012. He departed from Bela Krajina after the conclusion of the season.

Following his departure from Krajina, he managed to return to the Slovenian top tier in 2014 by signing with NK Krka. He debuted in the Prva Liga and appeared in 5 matches. Kirka re-signed him for an additional season, where he once again appeared in 5 matches for the club. In 2015, he played abroad in the Landesliga Burgenland for SV St. Margarethen/Rosental. After a season in Austria, he departed in the winter of 2016. In 2016, Žugelj returned to the Slovenian third division to play for Kolpa.

=== Canada ===
After the relegation of Kolpa in 2018, he played abroad for the second time, this time in Canada, where he initially played indoor soccer in the Arena Premier League with Croatia AC. After the conclusion of the 2017-18 winter season, he transitioned back to the outdoor format by playing in the Canadian Soccer League with SC Waterloo Region. In his debut season with Waterloo, he helped the club secure a playoff berth by finishing third in the league's first division. He also assisted the club in reaching the second round of the playoffs, where FC Vorkuta eliminated them.

Waterloo re-signed Žugelj for the 2019 season. Once more, he helped the club qualify for the postseason and recorded a goal against FC Ukraine United in the second round, but was eliminated.

After a year's absence, he returned to the CSL circuit to sign with St. Catharines Hrvat in 2021. He recorded a hat-trick on 14 September 2021, against Euru Academy. He also finished as the club's top goalscorer with 4 goals. Žugelj returned to the professional scene by signing with Hamilton City for the 2023 CSL season.

In 2025, he signed with league rivals, the Serbian White Eagles. Žugelj helped the Serbs secure a playoff berth by finishing second in the standings. In the playoffs, the Serbs qualified for the championship finals, where Scarborough SC defeated them.

== Honors ==
Serbian White Eagles

- CSL Championship runner-up: 2025
