= Nikola Đurković (Montenegrin footballer) =

Montenegrin footballer (born 1994)

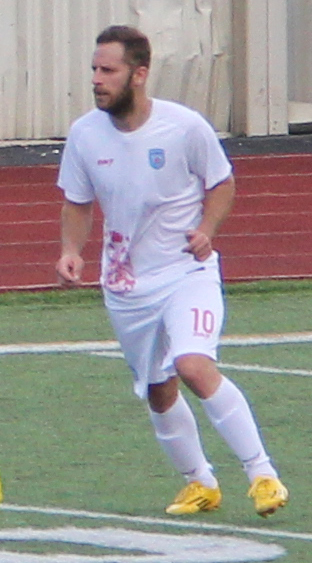
- Đurković with Serbian White Eagles in 2022

Personal information
- Full name: Nikola Đurković
- Date of birth: 3 January 1994 (age 32)
- Place of birth: Podgorica, Montenegro, FR Yugoslavia
- Height: 1.81 m (5 ft 11 in)
- Position: Defensive midfielder

Team information
- Current team: Serbian White Eagles
- Number: 10

Senior career*
Years	Team	Apps	(Gls)
2013–2014	Budućnost Podgorica		
2014–2015	Zabjelo		
2015–2016	Dečić	5	(0)
2016–2020	Kom		
2020–2022	Jezero	58	(3)
2022–	Serbian White Eagles		
- * Club domestic league appearances and goals

Nikola Đurković (Serbian Cyrillic: Никола Ђурковић; born 3 January 1994) is a Montenegrin football midfielder who plays for Canadian Soccer League club Serbian White Eagles FC.

== Career ==
=== Montenegro ===
He started in his hometown club Budućnost Podgorica. In 2014, he arrived in Zabjelo, where he stayed for one season, usually playing as a defensive midfielder. He then moved to Dečić, which marked his return to the Montenegrin top tier. In his debut season with the Tuzi-based club, he appeared in five matches. Following a season with Dečić, he returned to the country's second division to sign with his hometown club Kom, where he stayed for four years.

In his debut season with Kom, he helped the club secure promotion to the first division by winning the league title. The 2017–18 season marked his third stint in the top flight, where he appeared in 27 matches and recorded 2 goals. The club was relegated the following season, but Đurković remained with the club and assisted in securing promotion back to the first division during the 2018–19 season. In his final season with Kom, he made 24 appearances and registered 1 goal.

In 2020, he signed with league rivals Jezero. Đurković would make 31 appearances for the club in his debut season. He re-signed with Jezero for the following season, where he featured in 28 matches with 3 goals.

=== Canada ===
Đurković played abroad by joining the Serbian White Eagles in the Canadian Soccer League before the 2022 season. He recorded his first goal for the Serbs in his debut match against FC Continentals on May 29, 2022. Several weeks after he recorded a hat-trick against BGHC FC on June 19, 2022. He helped the western Toronto side secure the regular season title, which automatically clinched a playoff berth for the club. However, the Serbs were eliminated in the opening round of the playoffs by the Continentals.

He re-signed with the Serbs for the 2023 season, where he participated in the Royal CSL Cup final, in which Toronto Falcons defeated the White Eagles in a penalty shootout. The Serbs would finish the 2023 campaign as runners-up to Scarborough SC in the regular season.

The 2024 season marked his third year with the club and helped the Serbs win the Royal CSL Cup against Scarborough. In addition to the Royal CSL Cup, he also helped Serbia win the regular season title. In 2025, he helped the Serbs win their second Royal CSL Cup.

== Honors ==
FK Kom

- Montenegrin Second League: 2016–17

Serbian White Eagles

- Canadian Soccer League Regular Season: 2022, 2024
- Canadian Soccer League Royal CSL Cup: 2024, 2025
- Canadian Soccer League Royal CSL Cup runner-up: 2023
