= Andriy Sukhetskyi =

Ukrainian footballer

Personal information
- Full name: Andriy Tarasovych Sukhetskyi
- Date of birth: 11 February 1993 (age 33)
- Place of birth: Ukraine
- Position: Defender

Senior career*
Years	Team	Apps	(Gls)
2011	FC Sokil Zolochiv	2	(0)
2011–2012	KS Hetman Włoszczowa		
2013–2014	M.K.S. Orlicz Suchedniów		
2013–2014	M.K.S. Pilica Przedbórz	13	(0)
2014–2015	M.K.S. Halniak Maków Podhalański	29	(0)
2016–2017	Nyva Ternopil	33	(2)
2017	FC Agron-OTG	3	(0)
2017–2018	FC Ternopil	4	(0)
2017–2018	Nyva Terebovlya		
2019–2021	FC Ukraine United		
2023–	Toronto Falcons		
- * Club domestic league appearances and goals

Andriy Sukhetskyi (born February 11, 1993) is a Ukrainian footballer who plays as a defender for the Toronto Falcons.

== Career ==
Sukhetskyi played in the Ukrainian Amateur Football League in 2010 with FC Sokil Zolochiv. In 2011, he played abroad in the IV liga with KS Hetman Włoszczowa. Throughout his tenure in the IV liga he played with M.K.S. Orlicz Suchedniów, M.K.S. Pilica Przedbórz, and M.K.S. Halniak Maków Podhalański. In 2016, he returned to the Ukrainian Amateur Football League to play with FC Nyva Ternopil, and later with FC Agron-OTG. In 2017, he played in the Ukrainian Second League with FC Ternopil.

The following season he played with Nyva Terebovlya. In 2019, for a second time he played abroad in the Canadian Soccer League with FC Ukraine United. He featured in the CSL Championship final against Scarborough SC, but in a losing effort. He played in the Ontario Soccer League in 2021 with Ukraine United.

In 2023, he returned to the Southern Ontario-based circuit, to sign with the Toronto Falcons. In his debut season with Toronto, he helped the club win the Royal CSL Cup after defeating the Serbian White Eagles in a penalty shootout. Sukhetskyi would assist the club in finishing third in the regular season standings.

== Honors ==
Toronto Falcons

- Canadian Soccer League Royal CSL Cup: 2023
