= Zoran Knežević (footballer) =

Serbian footballer (born 1986)

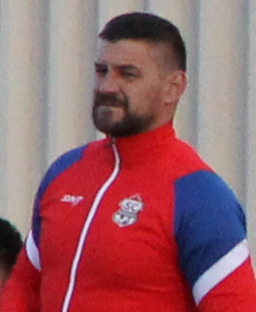
- Knežević in 2024

Personal information
- Full name: Zoran Knežević
- Date of birth: August 15, 1986 (age 40)
- Place of birth: Valjevo, SFR Yugoslavia
- Height: 1.80 m (5 ft 11 in)
- Position: Defensive midfielder

Youth career
- 1998–2002: Budućnost Valjevo

Senior career*
Years	Team	Apps	(Gls)
2002–2003	Budućnost Valjevo	7	(0)
2003–2005	Vujić Voda	20	(0)
2005–2008	BSK Borča	70	(7)
2008–2009	Khimki	1	(0)
2009–2010	BSK Borča	51	(5)
2010–2012	Gazovik Orenburg	14	(1)
2012–2014	Sloboda Užice	46	(1)
2014–2015	Padideh	25	(0)
2015–2016	Jagodina	20	(0)
2016	Bali United	8	(0)
2017	Budućnost Krušik 2014		
2017	Grbalj	10	(0)
2018–2022	Scarborough SC		

Managerial career
- 2023–2025: Scarborough SC
- * Club domestic league appearances and goals

Zoran Knežević (Serbian Cyrillic: Зоран Кнежевић; born August 15, 1986) is a Serbian former footballer who played as a defender and is a football manager.

== Club career ==
=== Early career ===
Knežević began playing in 2002 with FK Budućnost Valjevo in the Second League of Serbia and Montenegro, and in 2005 in the Serbian First League with FK BSK Borča. He would re-sign with Borča for the 2007-08 season.

=== Russia ===
In the winter transfer window of 2007-08, he was acquired by Russian Premier League side FC Khimki. He appeared in one match against Dynamo Moscow on March 23, 2008. His tenure with Khimki lasted a single season, and he departed from the club after his contract wasn't renewed. After a season in Serbia, he returned to Russia in the winter of 2011 to play in the second tier with Gazovik Orenburg. In total, he would play in 14 matches and score one goal.

=== Serbia ===
After his first stint in Russia, he returned to his former club Borca in 2009, where he played for two seasons in the country's top-tier league, the Serbian SuperLiga. Following his second spell in Russia, he resumed his career in the Serbian top tier by signing with Sloboda Užice for the 2012-13 season. He would re-sign with Sloboda for another season however, the club was relegated after the conclusion of the season.

In 2015, he returned to the SuperLiga to sign with FK Jagodina. In his debut season with Jagodina, he appeared in 20 matches. Knežević departed from Jagodina after their relegation to the second tier.

He returned to Europe in 2017 to play in the Serbian League West with Budućnost Krušik 2014. For the remainder of the 2017-18 season, he played in the Montenegrin First League with OFK Grbalj.

=== Asia ===
In 2014, he played abroad in the Iranian top tier, the Persian Gulf Pro League, with Padideh F.C. He departed from the club the following season due to a pay dispute. He would appear in 25 matches for Padideh.

In 2016, he returned to Asia to play in the Indonesia Soccer Championship with Bali United F.C.

=== Scarborough SC ===
In 2018, Knežević played abroad in the southern Ontario-based Canadian Soccer League with Scarborough SC. In his debut season with the Toronto-based club, he contributed a goal in the opening round of the playoffs against Hamilton City, which advanced Scarborough to the next round. Scarborough would ultimately reach the CSL Championship final, where they were defeated in a penalty shootout by FC Vorkuta. He re-signed with Scarborough for the 2019 season, where he assisted in securing the club's first championship title after defeating FC Ukraine United. The following season saw Scarborough claim their first divisional title after finishing first in the First Division. He made his fourth consecutive championship final appearance, where Vorkuta defeated Scarborough.

In 2021, he re-signed with the eastern Toronto side for his fourth season. Throughout the 2021 campaign, he appeared in the invitational tournament final, the ProSound Cup against rivals Vorkuta, where Scarborough was defeated in a penalty shootout. He won his second championship title by assisting Scarborough in defeating Vorkuta in the 2021 playoffs. He re-signed with Scarborough for the 2022 season. Throughout the 2022 campaign, the eastern Toronto side achieved an 18-game undefeated streak and playoff position by finishing third. Knežević made his third championship appearance, which Scarborough lost to FC Continentals (formerly FC Vorkuta).

== International career ==
Knežević represented the Serbia national under-21 football team.

== Managerial career ==
In 2023, he transitioned into management and was named the head coach of his former team, Scarborough SC. Knežević would lead the Toronto-based club to a regular-season title. In the 2024 season, he led Scarborough to the Royal CSL Cup final, where the Serbian White Eagles defeated them. Throughout the regular season, the club finished as runners-up to the Serbs.

Following Scarborough's defeat in the Royal CSL Cup final, he was dismissed from his post in 2025.

== Honours ==
=== Player ===
BSK Borča

- Serbian First League: 2008–09

Scarborough SC

- CSL Championship: 2019
- Canadian Soccer League First Division: 2020

=== Manager ===
Scarborough SC

- Canadian Soccer League Regular Season: 2023
- Canadian Soccer League Royal CSL Cup runner-up: 2024, 2025
