= Marko Krasić =

Serbian footballer (born 1985)

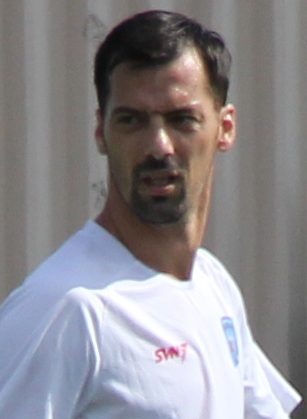
- Krasić in 2022

Personal information
- Full name: Marko Krasić
- Date of birth: 1 December 1985 (age 40)
- Place of birth: Kragujevac, SFR Yugoslavia
- Height: 1.83 m (6 ft 0 in)
- Position: Central midfielder

Team information
- Current team: Serbian White Eagles
- Number: 8

Youth career
- 2001–2004: Borac Čačak

Senior career*
| Years | Team | Apps | (Gls) |
| 2002–2008 | Borac Čačak | 32 | (0) |
| 2004 | → Remont Čačak (loan) | 3 | (0) |
| 2006–2008 | → Metalac Gornji Milanovac (loan) | 41 | (8) |
| 2008–2010 | Metalac Gornji Milanovac | 57 | (6) |
| 2010–2012 | Borac Čačak | 26 | (0) |
| 2012–2013 | Arema Indonesia | 18 | (3) |
| 2013–2014 | Citizen | 18 | (2) |
| 2014–2015 | Inđija | 9 | (0) |
| 2015 | Serbian White Eagles | | |
| 2016–2017 | Radnički Kragujevac | 26 | (6) |
| 2017–2018 | Rangers (HKG) | 17 | (2) |
| 2018–2019 | Southern | 17 | (2) |
| 2019–2020 | Rudar Pljevlja | 18 | (3) |
| 2020–2021 | Sloga Kraljevo | | |
| 2021 | Gruža | | |
| 2021–2022 | Mladi Radnik | | |
| 2022 | Napredak Markovac | | |
| 2022– | Serbian White Eagles | | |
- * Club domestic league appearances and goals

Marko Krasić (Serbian Cyrillic: Марко Красић; born 1 December 1985) is a Serbian professional footballer who plays for Canadian Soccer League club Serbian White Eagles.

== Club career ==
=== Early career ===
Krasić began his playing career with Borac Cacak. He would also play with Borac throughout their run in the country's top division.

He also played in the Serbian SuperLiga in 2009 with Metalac Gornji Milanovac. In total, he played in 26 matches and recorded 5 goals in the top tier. In 2011, he had a trial session with the Polish club Śląsk Wrocław.

=== Asia ===
Krasić was recruited by the Indonesian side Arema to assist the club in the 2012 AFC Cup tournament. He helped the team reach the quarterfinals, where they were defeated in a series of matches by Ettifaq FC. Throughout the continental tournament, he appeared in 7 matches.

After a season in the Indonesian top-tier, he remained in Asia to play in the Hong Kong First Division League with Citizen AA. He participated in the 2014 Lunar New Year Cup, where he scored a goal in the tournament final against S.C. Olhanense, which secured the title for the club.

=== Various stints ===
Following his run in Asia, he returned to his native Serbia in 2014 to play in the Serbian First League with Inđija. In the summer of 2015, he played abroad in the Canadian Soccer League with the Serbian White Eagles. In his debut season with Serbia, he assisted the club in securing the First Division title. SC Waterloo Region eliminated the Serbs in the second round of the playoffs.

After his stint in Canada, he returned to Serbia to play in the country's third tier with Radnicki 1923 Kragujevac. He helped Radnicki secure promotion to the second division by winning the league title.

=== Return to Asia ===
On 3 February 2016, he signed for Persib Bandung but ended up canceling his contract on 29 February 2016. His official return to the continent of Asia occurred in 2017 when he played in Hong Kong's premier league with Hong Kong Rangers. The next season, he remained in the top tier by signing with Southern.

=== Balkans ===
He returned to the Balkan region to play in the Montenegrin First League with Rudar Pljevlja. In 2020, he returned to the Serbian second division, where he played with Sloga Kraljevo.

=== Canada ===
Krasić returned to his former club, the Serbian White Eagles, for the 2022 season. He helped the Serbs in securing the regular-season title, including a playoff berth. He played in the second round of the postseason against FC Continentals, where the White Eagles were eliminated. He re-signed with the Serbs for the 2023 season, where he participated in the Royal CSL Cup final, in which Toronto Falcons defeated the White Eagles in a penalty shootout. The Serbs would finish the 2023 campaign as runners-up to Scarborough SC in the regular season.

He returned for the 2024 season and helped Serbia win the Royal CSL Cup against Scarborough. He also contributed to securing the 2024 regular-season title. In 2025, he helped the Serbs win their second Royal CSL Cup.

== Managerial career ==
In 2023, he served as a coach for the Serbian White Eagles academy program.

== Personal life ==
Krasić's older cousin, Miloš Krasić, was also a footballer.

== Honours ==
Citizen AA

- Lunar New Year Cup: 2014

Serbian White Eagles

- CSL Regular Season: 2015, 2022, 2024
- Canadian Soccer League Royal CSL Cup: 2024, 2025
- Canadian Soccer League Royal CSL Cup runner-up: 2023

Radnički Kragujevac

- Serbian League West: 2016–17
