= Stefan Milošević =

Stefan Milošević may refer to:

- Stefan Milošević (footballer, born January 1995), Serbian association football forward
- Stefan Milošević (footballer, born April 1995), Serbian association football defender
- Stefan Milošević (footballer, born 1996), Montenegrin association football forward
