= Bojan Zoranović =

Serbian footballer

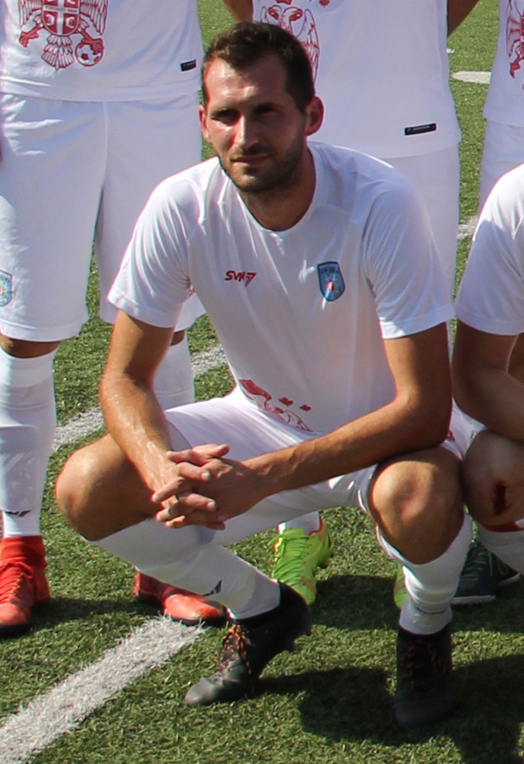
- Zoranović in 2022

Personal information
- Full name: Bojan Zoranović
- Date of birth: 12 April 1990 (age 36)
- Place of birth: Gornji Milanovac, SR Serbia, SFR Yugoslavia
- Height: 1.91 m (6 ft 3 in)
- Position: Centre forward

Youth career
- Takovo

Senior career*
Years	Team	Apps	(Gls)
2006–2007	Takovo	16	(3)
2007–2011	Metalac Gornji Milanovac	1	(0)
2010	→ Metalac Trgovački (loan)	8	(0)
2011–2012	Šumadija Aranđelovac	24	(5)
2012–2013	Radnički Kragujevac	7	(0)
2013	Metalac Gornji Milanovac	8	(0)
2014	Mačva Šabac	17	(1)
2015	Leotar		
2016	Kolubara	7	(0)
2016–2017	Dinamo Vranje	8	(0)
2018	CSC Mississauga		
2018	Unionville Milliken	2	(2)
2019	Scarborough		
2020–2023	Serbian White Eagles		

Managerial career
- 2023–2025: Serbian White Eagles
- * Club domestic league appearances and goals

Bojan Zoranović (Serbian Cyrillic: Бојан Зорановић; born 12 April 1990) is a Serbian coach and footballer.

== Club career ==
=== Early career ===
Zoranović began his career in 2006 in the Serbian League West with FK Takovo. In 2007, he moved up to the Serbian First League with Metalac Gornji Milanovac. Metalac would secure promotion to the country's top-tier league in the 2008-09 season. The club re-signed him for the following season, where he made his debut in the SuperLiga. His debut match was on August 14, 2010, against OFK Beograd. Though he managed to make his debut in the first division, he spent the majority of his tenure with loan spells with Šumadija Aranđelovac and Metalac Trgovački.

=== Serbia ===
He had another stint in the Serbian top tier in 2012 with Radnicki Kragujevac. In his debut season with Radnicki, he played 7 matches. After a season with Radnički, he returned to his former club Metalac Gornji Milanovac, where he appeared in 8 matches.

He returned to the Serbian second tier the following season to play with Mačva Šabac. In total, he appeared in 6 matches for the club.

=== Bosnia ===
In the winter of 2014, he was transferred abroad to the Premier League of Bosnia and Herzegovina to play with Slavija Sarajevo. In 2015, he returned to Bosnia to play in the First League of the Republika Srpska with FK Leotar. He departed from Leotar in the 2016 January transfer window.

=== Return to Serbia ===
Zoranović returned to the Serbian First League in 2016 to sign with FK Kolubara. His final season in Serbian football was with Dinamo Vranje for the 2016-17 season.

=== Canada ===
In 2018, Zoranović went abroad for the second time, this time in the Canadian Soccer League's first division with CSC Mississauga. He split the 2018 season by also playing with Unionville Milliken SC. After a season in Mississauga, he signed with league rivals Scarborough SC for the 2019 CSL season. In his debut season with the eastern Toronto side, he helped the club clinch a playoff berth by finishing as runners-up in the first division. He participated in the CSL Championship final, where Scarborough defeated FC Ukraine United.

Zoranović signed with the Serbian White Eagles for the 2020 CSL season. The Serbs qualified for the postseason, where they were eliminated in the first round by Vorkuta. He re-signed with Serbia for another season, where once again the club secured a postseason berth but was eliminated in the opening round by his former club, Scarborough.

The 2022 season marked his third stint with the organization. He helped the Serbs in securing the regular-season title, including a playoff berth. He also played in the second round of the postseason against FC Continentals, where the White Eagles were eliminated.

== Managerial career ==
In 2022, he served as an assistant coach for the Serbian White Eagles under Uroš Stamatović. Zoranović was promoted to the head coach position for the 2024 season. In the season's early stages, he secured the Royal CSL Cup against his former team, Scarborough. He would also lead Serbia to a double by winning the regular season title. In 2025, he helped the Serbs win their second Royal CSL Cup.

== Honours ==
=== Player ===
Serbian White Eagles

- Canadian Soccer League Regular Season: 2022

Scarborough SC

- CSL Championship: 2019

=== Manager ===
Serbian White Eagles

- Canadian Soccer League Regular Season: 2024
- Canadian Soccer League Royal CSL Cup: 2024, 2025
- CSL Championship runner-up: 2025
