= Branislav Vukomanović =

Serbian footballer and manager

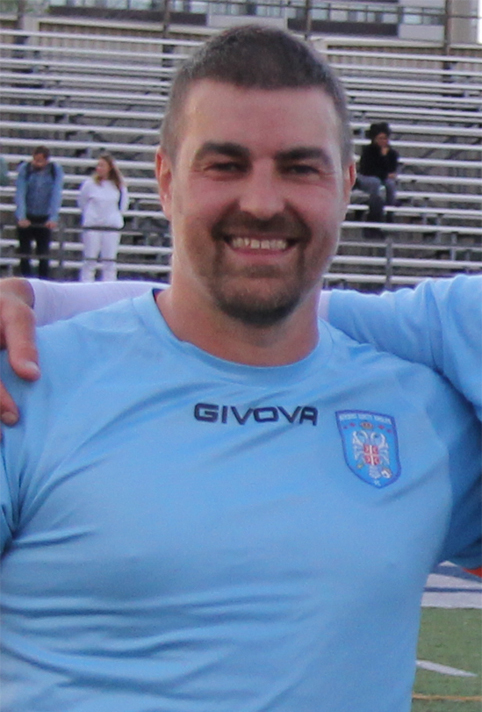
- Vukomanović in 2024

Personal information
- Date of birth: December 29, 1981 (age 44)
- Place of birth: Kragujevac, SFR Yugoslavia
- Height: 1.82 m (6 ft 0 in)
- Position: Defender

Team information
- Current team: Serbian White Eagles
- Number: 11

Youth career
- Radnički Kragujevac

Senior career*
Years	Team	Apps	(Gls)
2000–2001	Radnički Kragujevac	0	(0)
2001–2002	Šumadija 1903	16	(0)
2002–2006	Zeta	79	(4)
2006–2007	Artmedia Petržalka	20	(0)
2007–2008	Syrianska	13	(1)
2008	Radnički Kragujevac	7	(1)
2009	Farul Constanța	15	(0)
2009–2010	Radnički Kragujevac	5	(0)
2010	Sloboda Tuzla	5	(0)
2011	Szolnok MÁV	14	(0)
2011	Metalac Gornji Milanovac	5	(0)
2012	Kastrioti	10	(0)
2012	Radnički Niš	15	(0)
2013–2014	London City	35	(5)
2014–2021	Serbian White Eagles	113	(21)
2024–	Serbian White Eagles		

Managerial career
- 2017: Serbian White Eagles (assistant)
- * Club domestic league appearances and goals

Branislav Vukomanović (Serbian Cyrillic: Бранислав Вукомановић; born December 29, 1981) is a Serbian football player and coach.

== Career ==
=== Early career ===
Vukomanović began his career in 2000 in the First League of FR Yugoslavia with Radnički Kragujevac. In 2001, he played with Šumadija 1903. After a season with Šumadija, he returned to the country's top division to sign with FK Zeta. During his tenure at FK Zeta, he would feature in several continental tournaments, initially in the 2005–06 UEFA Cup. His second run at a continental tournament was in the 2006 UEFA Intertoto Cup against NK Maribor.

=== Europe ===
After four seasons with the Montenegrin-based club, he went abroad to the Slovak First Football League to play with Petržalka akadémia. After his stint in the Slovak circuit, he secured a deal in the Swedish Division 1 with Syrianska. In his debut season in Sweden, he helped the club secure a promotion by winning the league's north division.

After a brief stint in the Serbian League West with Radnicki, he played in Romania's Liga I with Farul Constanța. He returned to Serbia in 2010 to play with Radnički 1923.

In 2010, he played in the Premier League of Bosnia and Herzegovina with Sloboda Tuzla. He would finish the season in the Hungarian top tier with Szolnoki MÁV.

In 2011, he returned to the Serbian SuperLiga to play with Metalac Gornji Milanovac. Vukomanović left Serbia during the 2012 winter transfer market to play in the Albanian Superliga with Kastrioti.

After a brief stint in Albania, he played his final season in the top Serbian circuit with Radnički Niš in 2012. He left Radnički after a single season.

=== London City ===
In the summer of 2013, he played abroad in the Canadian Soccer League's first division with London City. Vukomanović served as the team's co-captain along with Rade Novković. In his debut season with the club, he assisted in clinching a postseason berth. London successfully defeated the York Region Shooters in the opening round of the playoffs. The club's run in the playoffs concluded in the next round after a defeat by Kingston FC.

=== Serbian White Eagles ===
In 2014, he signed with division rivals the Serbian White Eagles. He would help the Serbs secure a playoff berth by finishing sixth in the division. The White Eagles were eliminated in the preliminary round of the postseason by Kingston. Vukomanović re-signed with the Serbs for the 2015 season. In his second season with the Western Toronto side, he assisted the team in securing the divisional title. He recorded the winning goal against London in the quarterfinal round. In the semifinal round, he contributed a goal against SC Waterloo Region, but in a losing effort.

In his third season with Serbia, he assisted the club in winning the league championship after defeating Hamilton City. Vukomanović transitioned to the managerial side in 2017, serving in a player-assistant coach role. He helped the Serbs qualify for the postseason for the fourth consecutive season and contributed a goal in the opening round against Waterloo. The Serb's playoff journey concluded in the next round after a defeat by York Region. After several years as an active player, he became involved with the club's academy program in 2019. In 2020, he returned as an active player for Serbia. He would help the Serbs qualify for another playoff run and contributed a goal against Vorkuta.

After a hiatus from competitive football, he returned to sign with the White Eagles for the 2024 season. In his return season, he helped the Serbs win a double by first winning the Royal CSL Cup, followed by the regular season title.

== Managerial career ==
In 2017, he served as an assistant coach for the Serbian White Eagles in the Canadian Soccer League. In 2019, along with Uroš Stamatović, became involved with the Serbian White Eagles academy as a manager and coach.

== Honors ==
Syrianska FC

- Division 1 Norra: 2008

Serbian White Eagles

- CSL Championship: 2016
- Canadian Soccer League First Division/Regular Season: 2015, 2024
- Canadian Soccer League Royal CSL Cup: 2024
