= Stefan Milošević (footballer, born January 1995) =

Serbian footballer (born 1995)

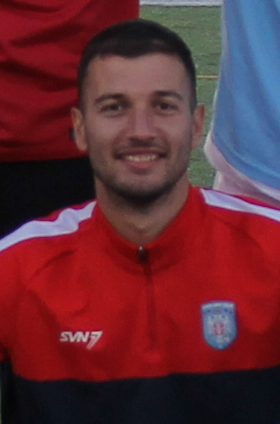
- Milošević in 2024

Personal information
- Full name: Stefan Milošević
- Date of birth: 4 January 1995 (age 31)
- Place of birth: Raška, FR Yugoslavia
- Height: 1.88 m (6 ft 2 in)
- Position: Centre forward

Team information
- Current team: Serbian White Eagles
- Number: 26

Youth career
- –2011: Bane
- 2011–2012: Sloboda Čačak
- 2013–2014: Metalac Gornji Milanovac

Senior career*
Years	Team	Apps	(Gls)
2011–2012	Sloboda Čačak	2	(0)
2013–2015	Metalac Gornji Milanovac	4	(0)
2015	→ Karađorđe Topola (loan)		
2015	→ Sloga Kraljevo (loan)	8	(1)
2016	Sloga Sjenica	14	(4)
2017–2022	Bane	3	(2)
2022–	Serbian White Eagles		
- * Club domestic league appearances and goals as of 8 April 2022

Stefan Milošević (Serbian Cyrillic: Стефан Милошевић; born 4 January 1995) is a Serbian football forward who plays for Canadian Soccer League side Serbian White Eagles FC.

== Club career ==
=== Serbia ===
Born in Raška, Milošević started his career with local club Bane, and later moved to Sloboda Čačak, where he made his senior debut during the 2011–12 season. Playing for the youth team of Metalac Gornji Milanovac, as a member of the generation that made promotion to the best level of Serbian youth league in 2014, he was the best team scorer with 24 goals in the 2013–14 season. In the summer of 2014, he signed his first four-year professional contract with the club. Milošević also played in 4 Serbian First League matches in 2014. In the winter break off the 2014–15 season, Milošević was loaned to Karađorđe Topola. After he returned to Metalac, he was not licensed for the Serbian SuperLiga and was later loaned to Sloga Kraljevo, where he played 8 Serbian League West and 1 cup match. and scored 1 goal, against his ex-club Karađorđe Topola. At the end of 2015, Milošević left Metalac Gornji Milanovac. During the first half of the 2016–17 season, Milošević appeared for Drina Zone League side Sloga Sjenica.

At the beginning of 2017, Milošević returned to his home club, Bane, along with his younger brother Nemanja.

=== Canada ===
In February 2022, he signed for Canadian Soccer League side Serbian White Eagles FC. He helped the Serbs secure the regular-season title, including a playoff berth. Milošević re-signed with the Serbs for the 2023 season, where he participated in the Royal CSL Cup final, in which Toronto Falcons defeated the White Eagles in a penalty shootout. The Serbs would finish the 2023 campaign as runners-up to Scarborough SC in the regular season.

Milošević returned for the 2024 season and helped Serbia win the Royal CSL Cup against Scarborough. He also contributed to securing the 2024 regular-season title. In 2025, he helped the Serbs secure a playoff berth by finishing second in the standings. In the playoffs, the Serbs qualified for the championship finals, where Scarborough defeated them.

== Career statistics ==
As of 8 April 2017

Club	Season	League			Cup		Continental		Other		Total	
Club	Season	Division	Apps	Goals	Apps	Goals	Apps	Goals	Apps	Goals	Apps	Goals
Sloboda Čačak	2011–12	Serbian League West	2	0	—		—		—		2	0
Sloboda Čačak	2012–13	Serbian League West	0	0	—		—		—		0	0
Sloboda Čačak	Total		2	0	—		—		—		2	0
Metalac Gornji Milanovac	2012–13	Serbian First League	0	0	—		—		—		0	0
Metalac Gornji Milanovac	2013–14	Serbian First League	2	0	0	0	—		0	0	2	0
Metalac Gornji Milanovac	2014–15	Serbian First League	2	0	0	0	—		—		2	0
Metalac Gornji Milanovac	2015–16	Serbian SuperLiga	0	0	—		—		—		0	0
Metalac Gornji Milanovac	Total		4	0	0	0	—		0	0	4	0
Karađorđe Topola (loan)	2014–15	Serbian League West	—		—		—		—		—	
Sloga Kraljevo (loan)	2015–16	Serbian League West	8	1	1	0	—		—		9	1
Sloga Sjenica	2016–17	Drina Zone League	14	4	—		—		—		14	4
Bane	2016–17	Morava Zone League	3	2	—		—		—		3	2
Career total			31	7	1	0	—		0	0	32	7

== Honours ==
Serbian White Eagles

- Canadian Soccer League Regular Season: 2022, 2024
- Canadian Soccer League Royal CSL Cup: 2024
- CSL Championship runner-up: 2025
- Canadian Soccer League Regular Season runner-up: 2025
- Canadian Soccer League Royal CSL Cup runner-up: 2023
