= Marko Kostić =

Serbian footballer (born 1995)

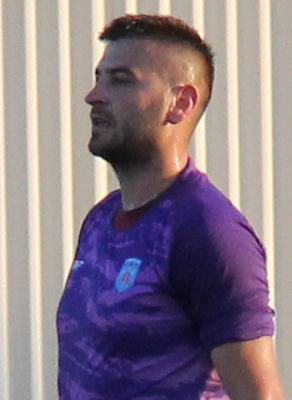
- Kostić in 2022

Personal information
- Date of birth: 10 October 1995 (age 31)
- Place of birth: Kosovska Mitrovica, FR Yugoslavia
- Height: 1.88 m (6 ft 2 in)
- Position: Goalkeeper

Youth career
- Radnički Kragujevac

Senior career*
Years	Team	Apps	(Gls)
2013–2016	Radnički Kragujevac	24	(0)
2014–2015	→ Pobeda Beloševac (loan)	13	(0)
2016–2017	Mokra Gora		
2017–2018	Trstenik PPT		
2018–2020	Trepča		
2020	RSK Rabrovo		
2021–2022	Sloga Kraljevo	1	(0)
2022–2024	Serbian White Eagles	1	(0)
- * Club domestic league appearances and goals as of 31 March 2024

Marko Kostić (Serbian Cyrillic: Марко Костић; born 10 October 1995) is a Serbian football goalkeeper who most recently played for Canadian Soccer League club Serbian White Eagles FC.

== Club career ==
=== Radnički Kragujevac ===
Kostić played at the youth level with Radnički Kragujevac. In 2014, he joined the senior team in the Serbian SuperLiga. He made his professional debut on May 16, 2015, against FK Jagodina. The following season Radnički was relegated to the Serbian First League where Kostić remained with the team. The club experienced another season where they were relegated to the third tier. Throughout the season, he appeared in 23 matches.

Following his departure from Radnički he played in the country's third division with RSK Rabrovo in 2020. In 2020, he returned to the second tier to play with Sloga Kraljevo as an emergency goalkeeper. He made his debut for Sloga on May 1, 2021, against FK Dubočica.

=== Canada ===
In the summer of 2022, he played abroad in the Canadian Soccer League with the Serbian White Eagles. He helped the Serbs in securing the regular-season title including a playoff berth. He played in the second round of the postseason against FC Continentals where the White Eagles were eliminated.

Kostić re-signed with the Serbs for the 2023 season where he participated in the Royal CSL Cup final where Toronto Falcons defeated the White Eagles in a penalty shootout. The Serbs would finish the 2023 campaign as runners-up to Scarborough SC in the regular season.

== Honours ==
Serbian White Eagles

- Canadian Soccer League Regular Season: 2022
- Canadian Soccer League Royal CSL Cup runner-up: 2023
