= Božo Milić =

Montenegrin footballer (born 1981)

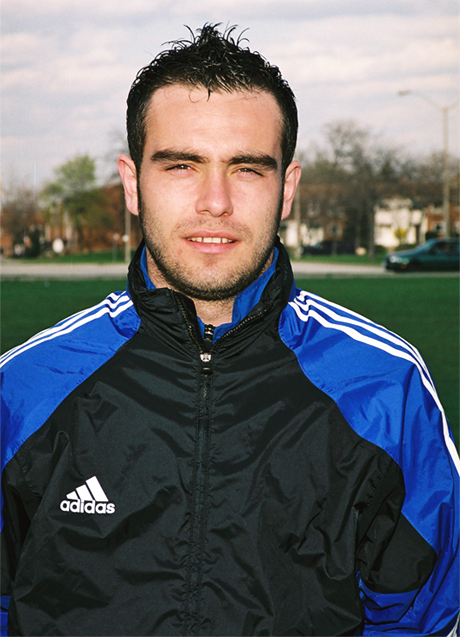
- Milić in 2006

Personal information
- Date of birth: 10 October 1981 (age 45)
- Place of birth: Titograd, SFR Yugoslavia
- Height: 1.82 m (5 ft 11 1/2 in)
- Position: Attacking midfielder

Youth career
- 1997–1998: Mladost Podgorica
- 1998–2000: Red Star Belgrade

Senior career*
Years	Team	Apps	(Gls)
2000	Big Bull	10	(1)
2001	Milicionar	2	(0)
2001–2002	Zemun	11	(0)
2003	Budućnost Podgorica	11	(1)
2003	Kom		
2004–2006	Borac Čačak	0	(0)
2006	Serbian White Eagles	21	(2)
2007–2008	Grbalj	30	(11)
2008	Petrovac	16	(7)
2009	Mogren	28	(15)
2010–2011	Petrovac	43	(9)
2011–2012	Grbalj	23	(6)
2013	Jezero		
2014	Zeta	12	(0)
2014–2015	Dečić		
- * Club domestic league appearances and goals

Božo Milić (Cyrillic: Божо Милић; born 10 October 1981) is a Montenegrin retired professional footballer.

== Playing career ==
Milić played in the Second League of FR Yugoslavia with Big Bull Bačinci in 2000. The following season he began playing at the First League of FR Yugoslavia with FK Milicionar, FK Zemun, FK Budućnost Podgorica, FK Kom, and FK Borac Čačak. In 2006, he went abroad to Canada to sign with the Serbian White Eagles in the Canadian Soccer League. He made his debut on May 19, 2006, against Italia Shooters. In his debut season he won the International Division and clinched a playoff berth. He featured in the CSL Championship final against Italia, but were defeated by a score of 1–0.

After a season abroad he returned to his homeland to play with OFK Grbalj in the Montenegrin First League. In the 2008-09 season he played with OFK Petrovac, where he won the Montenegrin Cup. In 2009, he signed with league champions FK Mogren, where he played in the 2009–10 UEFA Champions League against Hibernians F.C., and F.C. Copenhagen. He returned to Petrovac, and Grbalj to play one season with both clubs. In 2013, he played in the Montenegrin Second League with FK Jezero. He concluded his career with FK Zeta, and FK Dečić.

== Honors ==
Mogren

- Montenegrin Cup (1): 2007–08

Serbian White Eagles

- Canadian Soccer League International Division (1): 2006
