= Uroš Predić (footballer) =

Serbian footballer (born 1973)

Personal information
- Full name: Uroš Predić
- Date of birth: 11 August 1973 (age 53)
- Place of birth: Novi Sad, SFR Yugoslavia
- Height: 1.76 m (5 ft 9 1/2 in)
- Position: Midfielder

Senior career*
Years	Team	Apps	(Gls)
1996–1998	Hajduk Kula	23	(7)
1998–1999	Vojvodina	16	(1)
1999–2000	Rad	18	(1)
2000–2001	Orlen Płock	5	(0)
2001–2002	Mladost Lučani		
2002–2003	Beijing Guoan		
2003	Zagłębie Lubin	9	(0)
2004	Hajduk Kula	3	(0)
2004	Budućnost Banatski Dvor		
2004	Khazar Lankaran	3	(0)
2005	Hajduk Kula	13	(1)
2005–2006	Doncaster Rovers	6	(0)
2006	Serbian White Eagles	3	(0)
- * Club domestic league appearances and goals

Uroš Predić (Serbian Cyrillic: Урош Предић; born 11 August 1973) is a Serbian retired footballer who played as a midfielder.

== Playing career ==
Predić began his career in the First League of FR Yugoslavia with Hajduk Kula in 1996. In 1998, he signed with Vojvodina and played in the 1998 UEFA Intertoto Cup. Before he went abroad he had a stint with Rad. In 2000, he played with Orlen Płock in the Ekstraklasa. During his time in Poland he also played with Zagłębie Lubin in 2003. The following season he returned to Serbia to play with Mladost Lučani, and went to China in 2002 to sign with Beijing Guoan.

In 2004, he returned to his homeland to play with Hajduk, and Budućnost Banatski Dvor. He went a third time abroad to play with Khazar Lankaran in the Azerbaijan Premier League. In 2005, he was loaned to Doncaster Rovers in the Football League One. He finished his career in Canada near the end of the 2006 season, where he signed for Serbian White Eagles. He featured in the CSL Championship final against Italia Shooters, where they were defeated 1–0.
