= Marko Pavićević =

Serbian footballer (born 1986)

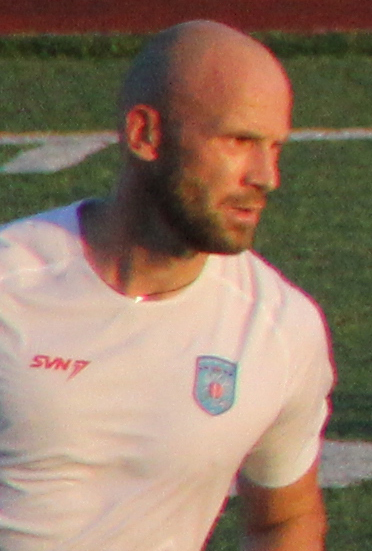
- Pavićević in 2022

Personal information
- Date of birth: 3 September 1986 (age 40)
- Place of birth: Gornji Milanovac, SFR Yugoslavia
- Height: 1.85 m (6 ft 1 in)
- Position: Forward

Team information
- Current team: Serbian White Eagles
- Number: 19

Senior career*
Years	Team	Apps	(Gls)
2003–2005	Takovo	64	(7)
2006–2010	Sevojno	116	(36)
2010–2011	Sloboda Užice	25	(4)
2011–2012	Ethnikos Achna	13	(2)
2012–2013	Borac Čačak	49	(8)
2014	Voždovac	15	(3)
2014–2015	Ermionida	29	(15)
2015–2016	Acharnaikos	30	(5)
2016	Kavala		
2017	Doxa Drama		
2017	Rodos		
2018	Voždovac	17	(1)
2018–2019	OFK Titograd	34	(11)
2019–2020	Napredak Kruševac	10	(1)
2020–2021	Kolubara	13	(2)
2021–2022	OFK Beograd	24	(6)
2022–	Serbian White Eagles		
- * Club domestic league appearances and goals as of 30 July 2022

Marko Pavićević (Serbian Cyrillic: Марко Павићевић; born 3 September 1986) is a Serbian professional footballer who plays as a forward for Canadian Soccer League club Serbian White Eagles FC.

== Career ==
=== Early career ===
After beginning with his hometown club Takovo, Pavićević would spend the next four and a half years with Sevojno, before the club merged into Sloboda Užice in the summer of 2010. Before Sevojno's merger, he played in the 2009–10 UEFA Europa League against FBK Kaunas and Lille.

In the summer of 2011, he went abroad to play in the Cypriot First Division with Ethnikos Achna.

After a single season in Cyprus, he returned to the Serbian circuit to play with Borac Čačak and participated in the 2011–12 Serbian Cup final, where Red Star Belgrade defeated Borac. Following his two-year stint in the Serbian second tier, he returned to the Serbian SuperLiga in 2014 to sign with FK Voždovac.

=== Greece ===
In the summer of 2014, Pavićević moved abroad to Greece and would spend the next three and a half years with several different clubs. His first stint was in the Greek second division with Ermionida. In his debut season with Ermionida, he appeared in 29 matches and recorded 15 goals. He would remain in the second tier by signing with Acharnaikos in 2015. After two seasons in the Greek second tier, Pavićević secured a deal with Kavala in the Gamma Ethniki.

In his short tenure with Kavala, he scored eight goals before his release in the winter of 2016. For the remainder of the 2016-17 season, he played with league rivals Doxa Drama. After the season concluded, he played his final season in Greece with Rodos for the 2017-18 season.

=== Balkans ===
Following his lengthy stay in Greece, he returned to his country's top tier in the winter of 2018 to sign with former club Voždovac. In the summer of 2018, he moved to OFK Titograd of the Montenegrin First League. In his debut season in Montenegro, he appeared in 34 matches and recorded 11 goals. He received another opportunity in the Serbian SuperLiga the following season with Napredak Kruševac.

In 2021, he returned to the Serbian second division and secured a deal with FK Kolubara. On 19 August 2021, he signed with OFK Beograd.

=== Canada ===
In the summer of 2022, he signed with the Serbian White Eagles of the Canadian Soccer League. He debuted for Serbia on 30 July 2022, against BGHC FC, where he recorded two goals. He helped the Serbs secure the regular-season title, including a playoff berth. Pavićević played in the second round of the postseason against FC Continentals, where the White Eagles were eliminated. The Serbs would finish the 2023 campaign as runners-up to Scarborough SC in the regular season.

Pavićević returned for the 2024 season and helped Serbia win the Royal CSL Cup against Scarborough, contributing both goals. He also contributed to securing the 2024 regular-season title. In 2025, he helped the Serbs win their second Royal CSL Cup, where he scored the winning goals.

== Honours ==
Serbian White Eagles

- Canadian Soccer League Regular Season: 2022, 2024
- Canadian Soccer League Royal CSL Cup: 2024, 2025

Sevojno

- Serbian Cup runner-up: 2008–09

Individual

- Serbian First League top scorer: 2008–09
