= Josip Ognjanac =

Serbian footballer

Personal information
- Date of birth: 24 January 1942 (age 84)
- Place of birth: Zemun, Independent State of Croatia
- Position: Forward

Senior career*
Years	Team	Apps	(Gls)
1961	Red Star Belgrade		
1964	Radnički Niš		
1968–1969	Serbian White Eagles		
1970	Rochester Lancers	9	(0)
1970	Serbian White Eagles		
1971	Montreal Olympique	4	(0)
1971	Serbian White Eagles		
1972	New York Greeks		
- * Club domestic league appearances and goals

Josip Ognjanac (Serbian Cyrillic: Јосип Огњанац; born 24 January 1942) is a Serbian former footballer who played as a forward.

== Career ==
Ognjanac played at the youth level with Red Star Belgrade, and ultimately reached the senior team. He later played with FK Radnički Niš, and Jedinstvo Zemun. Throughout his tenure with Radnički he was named to the Belgrade City All-Star team. Later on, he played abroad for three seasons in Sweden for Malmö FF. In 1968, he ventured out to the United States and settled in Canada where he played in the National Soccer League with the Serbian White Eagles.

In 1970, he played in the North American Soccer League with the Rochester Lancers. He played the remainder of the season with the Serbian White Eagles. In 1971, he returned to the North American Soccer League to play with Montreal Olympique. He finished the 1971 season once more with the Serbian White Eagles. In 1972, he played in the American Soccer League with the New York Greeks.
