= Ramon Bailey =

Jamaican footballer

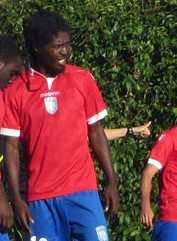
- Bailey in 2013

Personal information
- Date of birth: 22 February 1984 (age 42)
- Place of birth: Kingston, Jamaica
- Position: Midfielder

Senior career*
Years	Team	Apps	(Gls)
2005	MetroStars	0	(0)
2006	Kokkolan Palloveikot	2	(0)
2006–2007	Waterhouse		
2008–2011	Portugal FC		
2012–2013	Serbian White Eagles		
2014–2017	SC Waterloo Region		
- * Club domestic league appearances and goals

Ramon Bailey (born February 22, 1984) is a former Jamaican footballer who played as a midfielder.

== Club career ==
=== Early career ===
Bailey played college soccer for Merced College, where he was named to the All-American first team and received the MVP award. In 2005, he signed a contract with the MetroStars of Major League Soccer. Bailey was assigned to the team's reserve squad in his debut season. After a change in management, he was released by the club in 2006.

=== Finland ===
Following his release from New York, he secured a contract abroad in the Finnish Ykkönen with Kokkolan Palloveikot. Bailey would appear in the 2006 Finnish Cup final, where Helsingin Jalkapalloklubi defeated Kokkolan.

=== Jamaica ===
In 2007, he returned to his native country to sign with defending champions Waterhouse F.C. in the Jamaica Premier League.

=== Canada ===
Bailey joined the interprovincial Canadian Soccer League in the summer of 2008 to play for Portugal FC. He re-signed with the Toronto-based club in 2009. In 2012, he signed with league rivals the Serbian White Eagles. He would help the Serbs secure a playoff berth by finishing sixth in the league's first division. In the opening round of the playoffs, the White Eagles defeated his former team, Portugal FC (renamed SC Toronto). Their playoff journey would conclude in the next round after a defeat by Toronto Croatia.

Bailey returned to play with the Serbs for the 2013 season. He helped the team secure another playoff berth by finishing eighth in his sophomore year with Serbia. Kingston FC would eliminate Serbia in the opening round of the postseason. In 2014, he joined SC Waterloo Region. He helped Waterloo secure a playoff berth in his debut season. He recorded a goal against Toronto Croatia in the opening match of the playoffs. Bailey re-signed with Waterloo for the 2015 season. Waterloo would reach the championship finals where they lost the match to Toronto Croatia. In 2017, he contributed a goal against his former club the Serbian White Eagles in the preliminary round of the postseason.

== Honors ==
Kokkolan Palloveikot

- Finnish Cup runner-up: 2006

SC Waterloo Region

- CSL Championship runner-up: 2015
