= Daniel Baston =

Romanian footballer

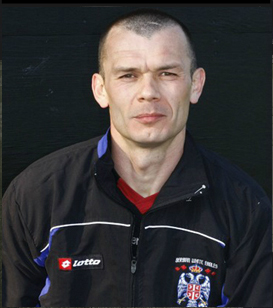
- Baston in 2010

Personal information
- Full name: Daniel Eugen Baston
- Date of birth: 7 June 1973 (age 53)
- Place of birth: Roman, Romania
- Height: 1.87 m (6 ft 2 in)
- Position: Forward

Senior career*
| Years | Team | Apps | (Gls) |
| 1992–1994 | Oțelul Galați | 23 | (5) |
| 1994–1995 | Dunărea Galați | 28 | (10) |
| 1995 | Oțelul Galați | 14 | (3) |
| 1995 | Evagoras Paphos | 0 | (0) |
| 1996 | Dinamo București | 5 | (1) |
| 1996–1997 | Politehnica Iaşi | 6 | (1) |
| 1997–1998 | Ceahlăul | 15 | (4) |
| 1998–1999 | SD Compostela | 13 | (1) |
| 1999–2000 | Astra Ploiești | 15 | (3) |
| 2000–2003 | Metalurh Zaporizhzhia | 27 | (7) |
| 2000 | → Metalurh-2 Zaporizhzhia | 7 | (6) |
| 2003–2004 | Gloria Buzău | 7 | (1) |
| 2004–2005 | CFR Cluj | 1 | (0) |
| 2009–2010 | Serbian White Eagles | | |
| Total | | 161 | (42) |

International career
| 2000 | Romania U23 | | |
- * Club domestic league appearances and goals

Daniel Eugen Baston (born 7 June 1973) is a Romanian former footballer.

== Career ==
Baston played for FC Dinamo Bucharest in the Romanian league before moving abroad to play for SD Compostela at age 25. He signed a two-year contract with the Spanish Segunda División club in August 1998. He would later play for Ukrainian Premier League side FC Metalurh Zaporizhya.
