= David Demaine =

English footballer (1942–2025)

Personal information
- Full name: David Jack Demaine
- Date of birth: 7 May 1942
- Place of birth: Cleveleys, Lancashire, England
- Date of death: 19 May 2025 (aged 83)
- Place of death: Colombia
- Position: Winger

Youth career
- 1960–1961: Blackpool

Senior career*
Years	Team	Apps	(Gls)
1961–1962	Tranmere Rovers	2	(0)
1962–1963	Southport	5	(0)
- Sankeys
1965–1966	Toronto Roma		
1966	Hartford S.C.		
1966	New York Ukrainians		
1967	Toronto Falcons	9	(3)
1970	Toronto White Eagles		
Total		16	(3)
- * Club domestic league appearances and goals

David Demaine (7 May 1942 – 19 May 2025) was an English footballer who played as a winger in the Football League for Tranmere Rovers and Southport.

In 1965, he played in the Eastern Canada Professional Soccer League with Toronto Roma for two seasons. The remainder of the 1966 season, he played in the American Soccer League with Hartford Soccer Club, and later with New York Ukrainians in the German-American Soccer League.

In 1967, he played in the National Professional Soccer League with the Toronto Falcons. In 1970, he played in the National Soccer League with the Toronto White Eagles.

Demaine died in Colombia on 19 May 2025, at the age of 83.
