= Prince Ihekwoaba =

Nigerian footballer

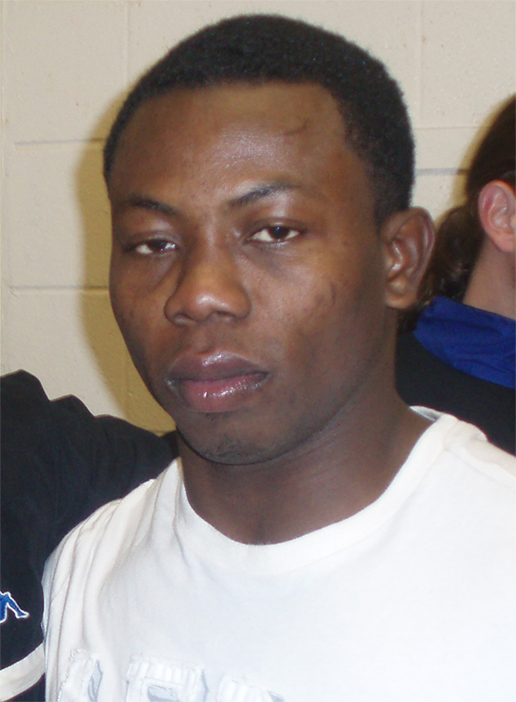
- Ihekwoaba in 2008

Personal information
- Full name: Prince Ihekwoaba
- Date of birth: November 9, 1989 (age 36)
- Place of birth: Lagos, Nigeria
- Height: 5 ft 9 in (1.75 m)
- Position: Forward

Youth career
- 2002–2003: University of Nigeria (Nsukka)

College career
Years	Team	Apps	(Gls)
2010–2013	Fanshawe Falcons		

Senior career*
Years	Team	Apps	(Gls)
2004	First Bank	12	(3)
2005–2006	Anambra United	5	(0)
2008–2009	Serbian White Eagles	16	(0)
2010	Prince Albert Lions		
- * Club domestic league appearances and goals

Prince Ihekwoaba // (born November 9, 1989) is a Nigerian former footballer.

== Career ==
Ihekwoaba was Canadian Soccer League champion with Serbian White Eagles FC.

== Honours ==
=== Serbian White Eagles ===
- CSL Championship: 2008
