= Milan Kojić =

Canadian soccer player

Milan Kojic
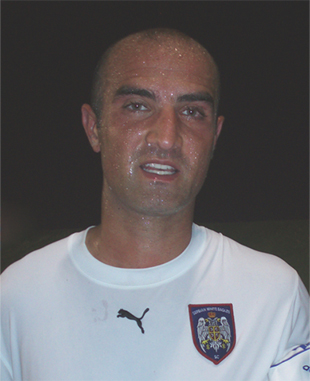
- Kojic in 2007

Personal information
- Date of birth: October 7, 1976 (age 50)
- Place of birth: Hamilton, Ontario, Canada
- Height: 6 ft 3 in (1.91 m)
- Position: Defender

Senior career*
Years	Team	Apps	(Gls)
1995–1996	Hamilton White Eagles		
1997	Vasalunds IF	21	(0)
1999–2000	Toronto Lynx	48	(2)
2001	Montreal Impact	20	(1)
2002	Toronto Lynx	24	(2)
2003–2006	Haugesund	85	(13)
2007	Serbian White Eagles	3	(0)

International career
1992–1993	Canada U17	8	(0)
1994	Canada U20	3	(0)
- * Club domestic league appearances and goals

Milan Kojic (born October 7, 1976) is a Canadian retired soccer player.

== Career ==
In the 1997 season, Kojic played with Vasalunds IF in Sweden.

In 1999, Kojic signed for the Toronto Lynx of the USL A-League, and made his debut on May 2, 1999 against Minnesota Thunder. In his debut season he started in 26 out of 28 games, and scored 2 goals. He had a standout year in 2000, leading the Lynx to one of the lowest goals-against average totals in the league. The highlight of his season was a dramatic goal against the Richmond Kickers in the A-League quarterfinals, which clinched the playoff series for the Lynx. In 2001, he signed for division rivals Montreal Impact. During his time with the Impact he scored a single goal in 20 games, and he helped the Impact come within one win of clinching the final playoff berth.

He re-joined Toronto in 2002 where he recorded 2 goals and 4 assists the highest single year point total for a Lynx defender. He nearly helped the Lynx make the playoffs, but a tie in the final game of the season against the Atlanta Silverbacks made the Charlotte Eagles take the final playoff spot.

Just after signing a new contract with the Lynx for 2003, Milan was transferred to FK Haugesund of the Norwegian First Division. As a starter for Haugesund, he became one of their leading players, helping turn around a team that finished 9th in 2002 to one that is challenging for a promotion spot in the Tippeligaen. In 2005, he helped FKH win back a promotion to the Adeccoligaen. On August 31, 2006 he was released from his contract, and returned home to play in the Canadian Soccer League with the Serbian White Eagles FC in 2007. He made his debut on May 27, 2007 against Trois-Rivières Attak.

== International ==
Kojic has also represented Canada at the Under-17 and Under-20 level, making his debut in 1993 against Nigeria.

== Personal life ==
His nephew is League1 Ontario player Milan Beader.
