= Uroš Stamatović =

Serbian footballer and coach

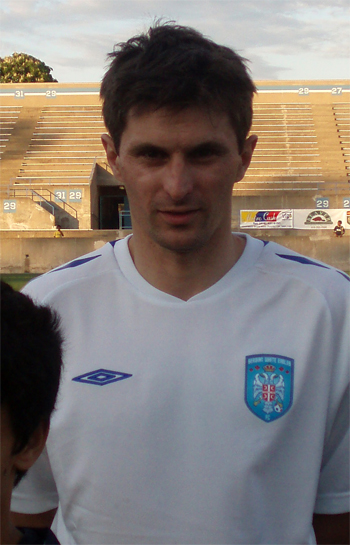
- Stamatović in 2009

Personal information
- Full name: Uroš Stamatović
- Date of birth: November 9, 1976 (age 49)
- Place of birth: Užička Požega, SFR Yugoslavia
- Height: 1.81 m (5 ft 11 in)
- Position: Midfielder

Team information
- Current team: Serbian White Eagles (head coach)

Senior career*
| Years | Team | Apps | (Gls) |
| 1992–1993 | Borac Čačak | | |
| 1993–1994 | Mladost Lučani | 9 | (0) |
| 1994–1997 | Sloboda Užice | 48 | (3) |
| 1997–1998 | Mladost Lučani | 25 | (1) |
| 1998–2004 | Hajduk Kula | 125 | (13) |
| 2004–2007 | Mladost Lučani | | |
| 2007–2010 | Serbian White Eagles | 64 | (3) |

Managerial career
- 2012–2016: Serbian White Eagles
- 2017: Serbian White Eagles
- 2018–2021: Serbian White Eagles
- 2022–2023: Serbian White Eagles
- 2026–: Serbian White Eagles
- * Club domestic league appearances and goals

Uroš Stamatović (Serbian Cyrillic: Урош Стаматовић; born November 9, 1976) is a Serbian retired professional footballer and coach. He is the head coach of Serbian White Eagles FC of the Canadian Soccer League.

== Club career ==
=== Serbia ===
Stamatović began his career in 1992 in the Second League of FR Yugoslavia with FK Borac Čačak. In 1995, he continued playing in the country's top-tier league by signing with Sloboda Užice.

Throughout his time in the top tier, he played with Mladost Lučani, and Hajduk Kula. In total, Stamatović played over 200 first-league matches and scored over 30 goals.

=== Canada ===
In 2007, he went abroad to play in the Canadian Soccer League with the Serbian White Eagles. He made his debut on June 17, 2007, against Trois-Rivières Attak. In his debut season, he assisted the club in securing the International Division title. The club would ultimately reach the championship final where the western Toronto side was defeated by Toronto Croatia in a two-game series. Stamatović re-signed with the White Eagles the following season. Throughout the season he aided the Serbs in clinching a playoff berth by finishing second in the division. For the third consecutive season, the Serbs reached the championship final where they successfully defeated Trois-Rivières Attak in a penalty shootout.

In 2009, he helped the White Eagles in claiming their second divisional title. During the season he made his third championship appearance where the Serbs were defeated by Trois-Rivières. In 2011, he officially retired from professional football and transitioned into the managerial side.

== Managerial career ==
Upon retiring in 2011, Stamatović became the assistant coach of the Serbian White Eagles. In 2012, he was promoted to head coach. Stamatović's first season in charge saw the club secure a postseason berth by finishing seventh in the First Division. In the first round of the postseason tournament, he led the White Eagles to a victory over SC Toronto. The club's playoff run concluded in the next round after a defeat by Toronto Croatia.

He continued coaching the team for the 2013 season. In his second term as head coach, he secured another consecutive playoff berth by finishing eighth in the division. The Serbs would be eliminated from the postseason in the first round by Kingston FC. The 2014 season marked his third as head coach of the organization where he led them to another playoff berth bus finishing sixth. Once more their playoff stint was cut short as they were eliminated by Kingston in the quarterfinals. In 2015, he achieved his first piece of silverware as a head coach when the Serbs successfully clinched the divisional title. Their playoff run ended in the second round after a defeat by SC Waterloo Region.

For the 2016 season, the Serbs appointed Mirko Medić as head coach while Stamatović served as his assistant coach. Throughout the season the club successfully won the championship title after defeating Hamilton City. He briefly returned to his previous role the following season but was ultimately succeeded by Milan Mijailović and named the club's sports director.

In 2019, he contributed to the establishment of the club's academy where along with Branislav Vukomanović served as directors. He also returned to coach the team for the 2019 season. After a season with Zoran Rajović in charge, Stamatović once again became head coach in 2022. Throughout the season he successfully managed to secure the regular season title. In the postseason the Serbs were eliminated from the competition in the semifinals by FC Continentals. He also secured an affiliation agreement between the White Eagles and his former club Sloboda Užice. For the 2023 season, the Serbs would finish as runners-up to Scarborough SC in the regular season.

== Honours ==
=== Player ===
Serbian White Eagles

- Canadian Soccer League: 2008
- Canadian Soccer League International Division: 2007, 2009

=== Manager ===
Serbian White Eagles

- Canadian Soccer League: 2016 (assistant coach)
- Canadian Soccer League First Division: 2015
- Canadian Soccer League Regular Season: 2022
