= 2023 Canadian Soccer League season =

Professional soccer league season

Canadian Soccer League
- Season: 2023
- Dates: May 28 – September 16 (regular season); September 23 – October 7 (playoffs)
- Regular season champions: Scarborough SC (2nd title)
- Matches: 42
- Goals: 190 (4.52 per match)
- Top goalscorer: Serhiy Ivlyev (13)
- Biggest home win: Serbian White Eagles 9–2 Weston United (August 26, 2023)
- Biggest away win: Weston United 1–9 Dynamo Toronto (July 22, 2023)
- Longest winning run: 5 matches Scarborough SC; Toronto Falcons
- Longest unbeaten run: 6 matches Toronto Dynamo
- Longest winless run: 12 matches Ooty Black Pearl
- Longest losing run: 12 matches Ooty Black Pearl

The 2023 Canadian Soccer League season was the 26th season under the Canadian Soccer League name. The season commenced on May 28, 2023, with a tribute match, while the regular season officially began on May 28, 2023. The season would conclude on September 16, 2023, with Scarborough SC winning their second regular-season title.

Originally, a postseason was scheduled to occur around late September till early October, but was canceled after the completion of the regular season. Reasons for the cancellation varied from a lack of available playing venues to financial reasons.

== Summary ==
The regular season began in late May 2023 with seven teams vying for the league title and a playoff berth. It became evident early on that the regular season title would be primarily contested between Scarborough SC and the Serbian White Eagles. The Serbs started the campaign in a winning fashion by initially producing a three-game undefeated streak until succumbing to Hamilton City in the early stages of the competition. Despite the loss, the defending divisional champions would later regain the lead in the standings from Scarborough.

On the Scarborough front, the team also had an impressive run in the early stages. The eastern Toronto side also managed an undefeated run, even usurping the top position from Serbia, when the original result of a controversial loss to debutant Dynamo Toronto was reversed in Scarborough's favor. The club benefited from a victory over the Serbs in their first encounter. However, the lead was only temporary as the Serbs would regain leadership in the standings on a technicality. This technicality stemmed from their original match, where Scarborough failed to provide the proper documents regarding an acquired import. Shortly after, the disciplinary committee reversed the decision in Serbia's favor.

Following the controversial match, the situation would remain the same throughout the season, with the White Eagles holding the lead and Scarborough trailing behind. Ultimately, the regular season title would be decided in the final match. Before the final game, Serbia had a two-point advantage over Scarborough and needed only a victory or a draw to secure the title. In the final week of the competition, Scarborough defeated the western Toronto side and claimed their second divisional title. Monetary issues among member clubs were the reason for the cancellation of the postseason, as some members failed to fulfill their financial dues to the league.

== Changes from 2022 ==
League membership increased to seven clubs with the addition of three expansion clubs. The expansion sides included Dynamo Toronto FC, Ooty Black Pearl FC, and Weston United FC. The acceptance of Dynamo Toronto marked the league's return to the city of Brampton in the Greater Toronto Area. Ooty Black Pearl and Weston United are both ethnic association clubs representing the Indian and Brazilian communities in the Greater Toronto Area. The two departing clubs were defending champions FC Continentals, which requested a year-long hiatus, and York Region Shooters.

Hamilton City became a single entity once more, as they previously fielded a hybrid team during the COVID-19 pandemic. Brantford Galaxy was originally scheduled to compete but withdrew just before the start of the season.

The league commenced with the Royal CSL Cup, a tribute match in honor of former league announcer Enio Perruzza, who died in 2021. All league matches were played in Mississauga, a suburb of Toronto, with the first half played at Mattamy Sports Park and the remainder at the Paramount Centre fields.

== Teams ==
Team	City	Stadium	Manager
Dynamo Toronto FC	Brampton, Ontario	Mattamy Sports Park Paramount Centre fields	Wais Azizi
Hamilton City	Hamilton, Ontario	Mattamy Sports Park Paramount Centre fields	Saša Vuković
Ooty Black Pearl FC	Toronto, Ontario	Mattamy Sports Park Paramount Centre fields	Anto Santhosh
Scarborough SC	Toronto, Ontario (Scarborough)	Mattamy Sports Park Paramount Centre fields	Zoran Knežević
Serbian White Eagles	Toronto, Ontario (Etobicoke)	Mattamy Sports Park Paramount Centre fields	Uroš Stamatović
Toronto Falcons	Toronto, Ontario	Mattamy Sports Park Paramount Centre fields	Maksym Rohovskyi
Weston United FC	Toronto, Ontario (York)	Mattamy Sports Park Paramount Centre fields	Wallace Reis

== Standings ==
Pos	Team	Pld	W	D	L	GF	GA	GD	Pts	Qualification
1	Scarborough SC (X)	12	9	1	2	37	9	+28	28	~~Playoff semifinals~~
2	Serbian White Eagles	12	9	0	3	42	18	+24	27	~~Playoff semifinals~~
3	Toronto Falcons	12	8	1	3	32	9	+23	25	~~Playoff quarterfinals~~
4	Dynamo Toronto FC	12	6	1	5	33	22	+11	19	~~Playoff quarterfinals~~
5	Hamilton City	12	5	1	6	20	33	−13	16	~~Playoff quarterfinals~~
6	Weston United FC	12	1	2	9	12	49	−37	5	~~Playoff quarterfinals~~
7	Ooty Black Pearl	12	0	2	10	14	50	−36	2	

Source: []
Rules for classification: 1) points; 2) total wins; 3) head-to-head points; 4) goal differential; 5) most goals
(X) Regular season champion

== Royal CSL Cup ==
The Royal CSL Cup was a tribute match in honour of former league announcer Enio Perruzza, who died in 2021.

May 13, 2023	Serbian White Eagles	0–0 (a.e.t.) (4–5 p)	Toronto Falcons	Mississauga, Ontario
16:00		Report		Stadium: Mattamy Sports Park
	Penalties
	Krasić (penalty scored); Milošević (penalty scored); Đurković (penalty scored); Marko Stajić (penalty scored)		Vasyl Matviyshin (penalty scored); Solonynko (penalty scored); Pitel (penalty scored); Sukhetskyi (penalty scored); Yevhen Osypenko (penalty scored)

== Notes ==
1. The playoffs did not take place due to financial and venue considerations.
