= Serbian White Eagles FC =

Canadian soccer team

Serbian White Eagles
- Full name: Serbian White Eagles Football Club
- Nicknames: Sons of Serbia; Serbia
- Short name: SWE, SER
- Founded: 1968; 58 years ago (as Serbia Football Club)
- Stadium: Rob Ford Stadium
- Capacity: 2,200
- President: Dragan Bakoč
- Head coach: Uroš Stamatović
- League: Canadian Soccer League
- 2026: Regular season: N/A; Playoffs: 2nd
- Website: http://www.serbianwhiteeagles.ca/
Home colours	Away colours	Third colours

Serbian White Eagles Football Club (Serbian: Фудбалски клуб Српски бели орлови, romanized: Fudbalski klub Srpski beli orlovi) is a Canadian semi-professional soccer team. The team is a member of the Canadian Soccer League, a non-FIFA sanctioned league.

The team's home kit is all white commemorating the white double-headed eagle which appears on the Serbian flag while the away colours are red-blue-white commemorating the tricolour of the Serbian flag. The colour white was also chosen as it symbolizes purity and innocence. The third set of jerseys is sky blue. The club also has teams in the Canadian Soccer League Reserve Division and the Ontario Soccer League.

The club was established in Hamilton, Ontario in 1968 under the name Serbia FC and joined the professional ranks by becoming a member in the National Soccer League after relocating to Toronto and becoming the Serbian White Eagles. The White Eagles had their first taste of success in 1974, and became the first Canadian soccer club to compete in the CONCACAF Champions Cup. In 1981, they withdrew from the NSL and became an amateur club in the process. After a 25-year hiatus from professional soccer, they returned in 2006 to compete in the Canadian Soccer League (the successor league to the NSL).

Their return was a success as they dominated the league in both performance and attendance. Within their first four seasons they became the second club in CSL history to reach the CSL Championship final in four consecutive seasons. During those four seasons they produced three division titles, and a championship. In regards to league attendance they averaged the highest number of spectators, which revived their derby match against their rivals Toronto Croatia.

Shortly after, the team's performance went into a decline but they still maintained their powerhouse status as they continued to consecutively qualify for the playoffs. In 2015, the White Eagles began rejuvenating their performance by claiming that year's regular season title, the championship in 2016, and the regular season title in 2022 and 2024.

== History ==
=== Early years (1968–1980) ===
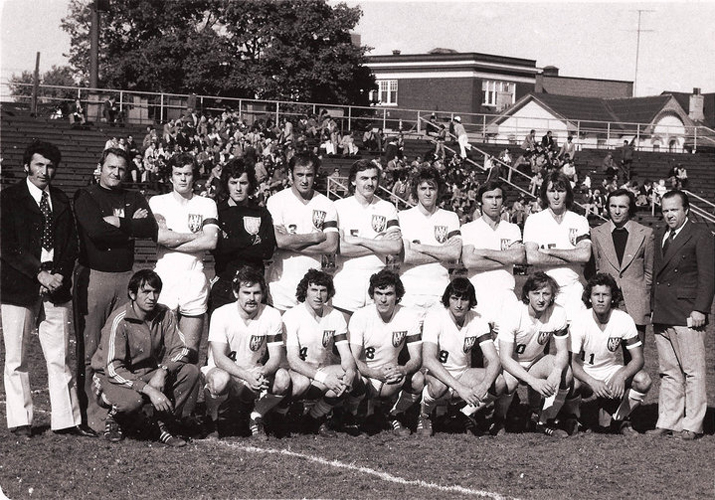
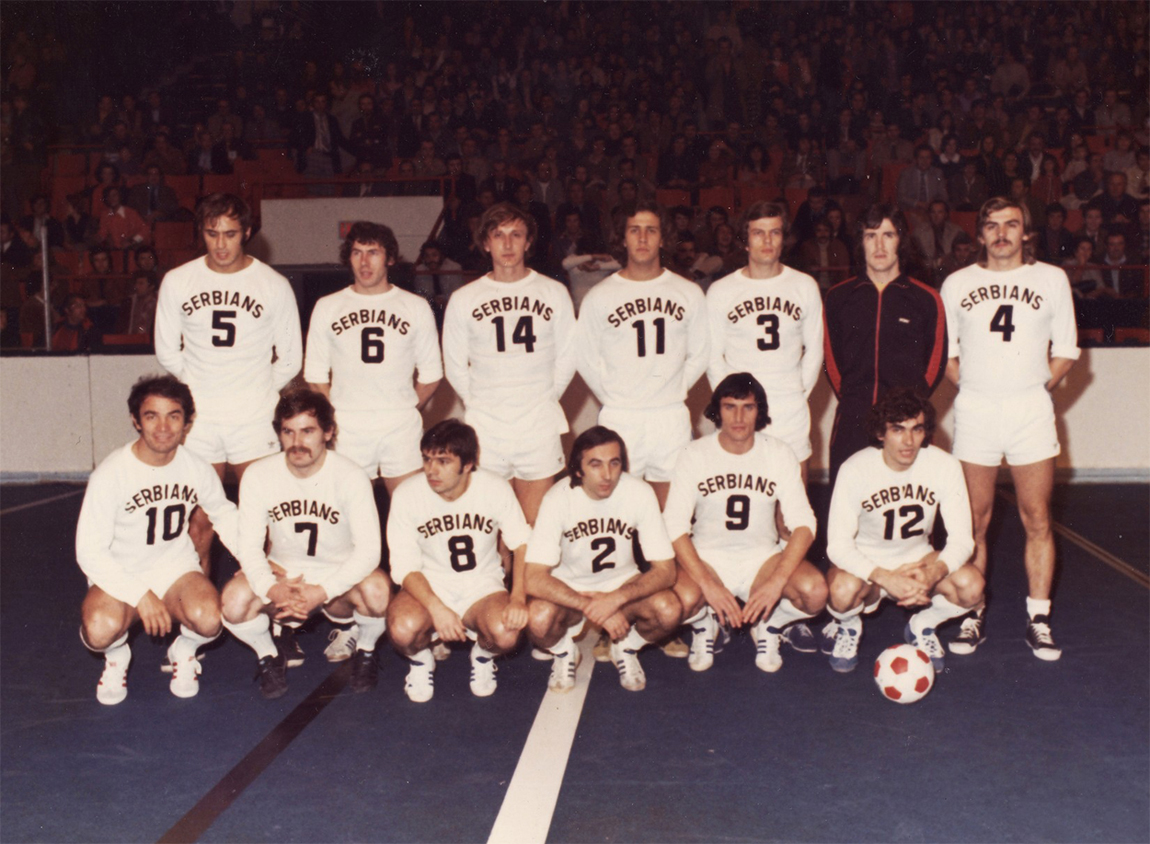
In 1973, the team fielded an outdoor team (left) and indoor team for which Dragoslav Šekularac played (right).

The Serbian White Eagles were established in 1968 in Hamilton, Ontario as Serbia FC and operated under that name for a short time before relocating to Toronto and becoming the Serbian White Eagles. In these beginnings, the club participated in the National Soccer League.

Prior to the 1973 season, the team imported nine players from Yugoslavia. Tragedy struck the team on June 10, 1973, when 25-year-old forward Alexander Zivaljevic was killed in a car accident on the Queen Elizabeth Way in Toronto. The driver of the car, 24-year-old Niko Skrvic, was also killed when he lost control of the car. Injured in the crash were Eagles players Verko Mitrovic and Ljubo Dimic. 32-year-old Mitrovic suffered a crushed chest and was paralyzed from the waist down, while 26-year-old Dimic suffered a fractured skull and a kidney injury.

The team qualified for the 1975 CONCACAF Champions' Cup where they lost to Mexican team CF Monterrey in the first round after a brawl on the pitch of the Exhibition Stadium. The brawl began as a fight between Eagles player Dragi Denkovski and Monterrey player Gustavo Peña which then led to spectators rushing the field. The Serbian White Eagles subsequently received a suspension. In the 1976 CONCACAF Champions' Cup, the Serbian White Eagles advanced to the second round of the North American Zone on a bye where they were set to face León but withdrew.

In 1981, the Serbian White Eagles withdrew from the league, becoming an amateur club in the process.

=== Rebirth and instant success (2006) ===
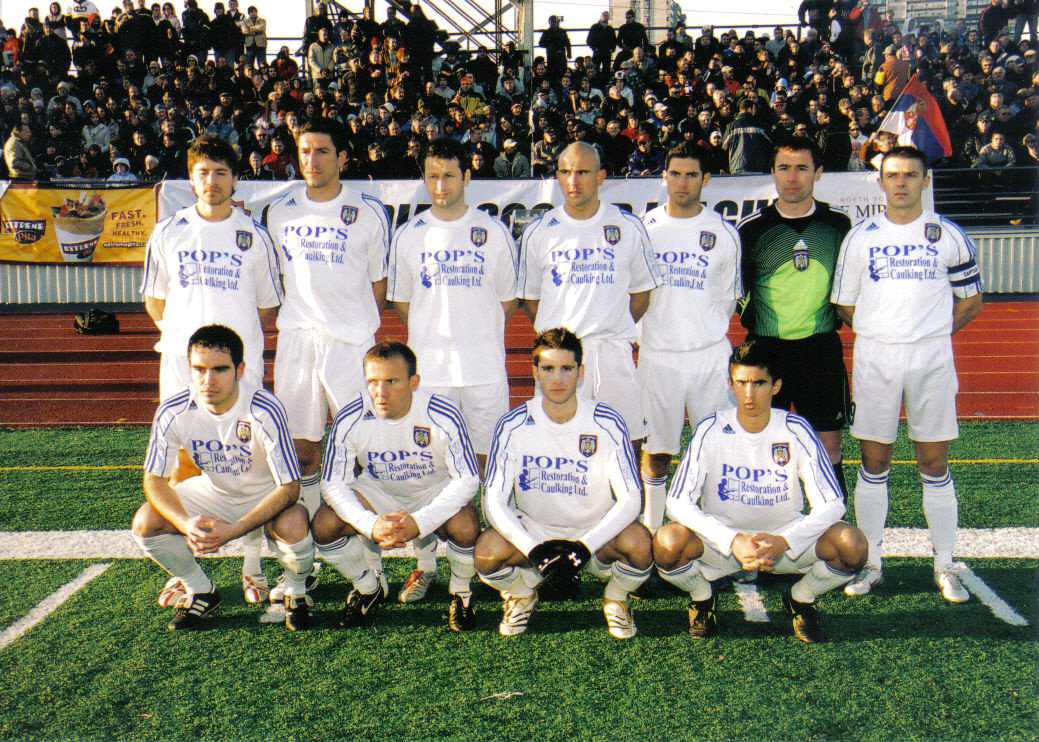
In their debut season, the White Eagles averaged the largest number of supporters throughout the league and reached the championship final.

They remained an amateur club until February 2006, when they joined the Canadian Soccer League, becoming one of the most successful expansion clubs in the league's history. Prior to the start of the 2006 Canadian Soccer League season, it was announced that the legendary Dragoslav Šekularac would become head coach of the expansion side with first assistant being Stevan Mojsilović. Other big names were brought in as well to help re-build the team. These included (among others): club legend Mike Bakic as president of the club, the director of player personnel was another club legend Mike Stojanovic, the general manager was Ken Stanojević who (along with Gojko Paić) was GM during the club's heyday in the 1970s while the director of football was Nenad Stojkov. This was Šekularac's second stint with the White Eagles having already played for and coached them in the past. With seasoned internationals being brought over from Serbia and the rest of Europe, the team was set.

The roster assembled by Šekularac consisted of players with European experience and CSL veterans. The players brought in were Saša Viciknez, Dušan Belić, Siniša Ninković, Dragan Radović, Niki Budalic, Božo Milić, Uroš Predić, Nenad Stojčić, Mirko Medić, Gabriel Pop, Alex Braletic, and Marc Jankovic. Šekularac's stint, though short-lived, was not without success. The club was a hit in its first season, finishing first in the International Conference with 55 points and first overall (tallying both conferences). In the regular season, Šekularac guided the club to 17 wins, 1 loss and 4 ties with a whopping goal differential of 66:13. The team finished with the best offensive and defensive record. A formidable striking partnership consisting of Pop and Viciknez was formed with Pop finishing as the league's top goalscorer followed by Viciknez as runner up. For their efforts Pop received the CSL Golden Boot, while Viciknez was named the CSL MVP.

The Eagles advanced to the knockout-stage, defeated Toronto Supra Portuguese in the quarterfinals with a score of 3–0 and defeated the Windsor Border Stars in the semifinal 6–1. Their season was brought to an end by the Italia Shooters in the CSL Championship final where Italia scored the lone goal to claim the championship. Though the White Eagles fell short they were embraced by the Serbian Canadian community and averaged the highest attendance of any team in the CSL.

=== League powerhouse and championship (2007–2008) ===
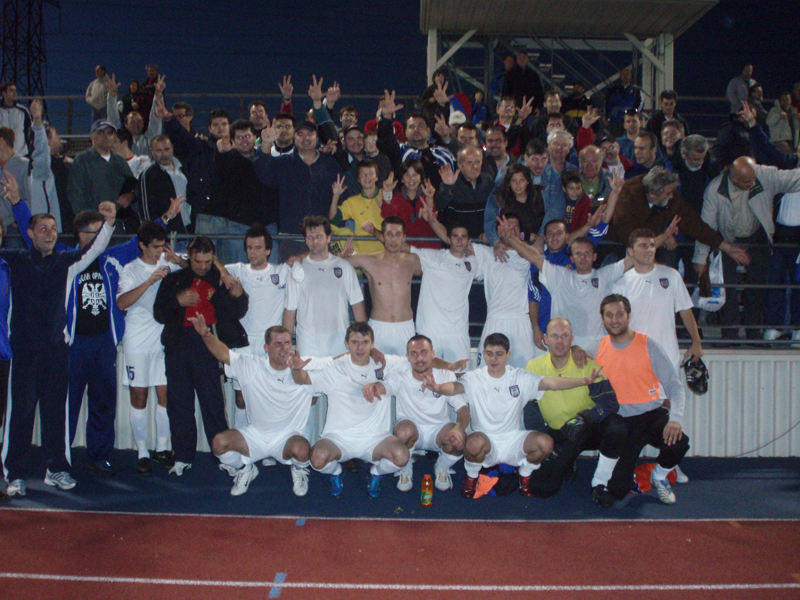
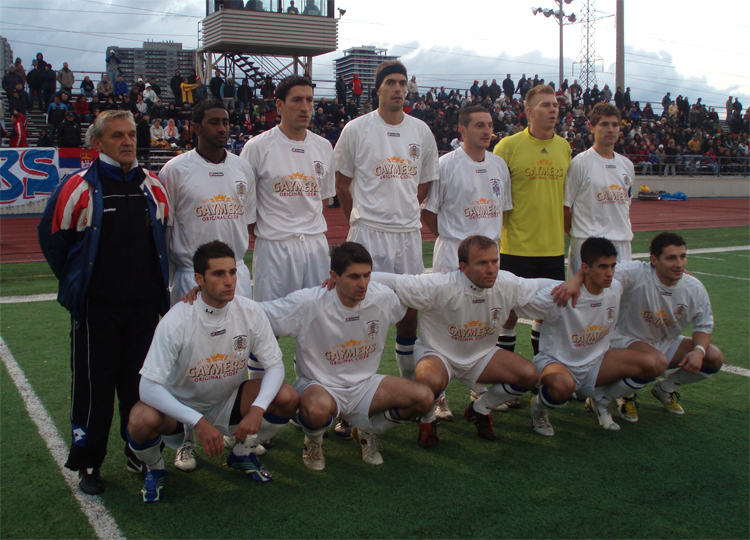
Advancing to the finals in 2007 (left) and the starting eleven for the 2008 final (right).

Some changes were made prior to the 2007 season with starting goalkeeper Dušan Belić promoted to player-coach while Dragan Bakoč (vice-president of the club in 2006) was made president. Serbian writer Prvoslav Vujčić wrote the lyrics for the club's anthem in 2007. Belić was player-coach for a few months until he took up a scouting position in Slovenia. Belić was replaced in net by CSL veteran Arthur Zaslavski and by former Canadian under-17 international George Radan. Radan came out of an 11-year-long retirement to help the Eagles with their keeper problems. Zaslavski and Radan rotated minutes but Radan got the notch when the playoffs started nearing. Then-assistant coach Siniša Ninković (another 2006 alumnus) took up the head-coaching position but was replaced prior to the playoffs by Toronto Falcons coach Branko Pavlović. Notable acquisitions were Uroš Stamatović, Osni Neto, Ricardo Munguía Pérez, Zoran Kokot and Milan Kojić which proved to be key additions.

Throughout the season the Eagles clinched their second consecutive division title, and once more averaged the highest attendance in the CSL. Serbia had five of their players including head coach Ninković selected for the All-Star game. In the first round of the postseason they faced the Windsor Border Stars, where they advanced to the next round with Budalic, and Kokot providing the goals in a 2–1 victory. Their opponents in the next round were Trois-Rivières Attak, where Kokot and Dragorad Milićević contributed the goals in their 2–1 win. The victory marked their second consecutive championship final appearance, where they faced their rivals Toronto Croatia. Due to their heated rivalry and without an adequate stadium available in order to separate the fans, the league was forced to change the format to a two-leg game rather than the standard knockout. In the two-game final, the White Eagles were defeated by Toronto Croatia by a score of 4–1 on aggregate.

Prior to the 2008 season, the club continued its tradition of bringing over experienced coaches from Serbia as this time Milan Čančarević was made head coach. Notable imports were Caswain Mason, Darryl Gomez, Prince Ihekwoaba, Said Ali, and Diego Hernán Maradona (son of Lalo Maradona). The White Eagles qualified for the play-offs for the third straight season by finishing second in their division. In the preliminary round of the postseason they defeated the North York Astros by a score of 2–1. The Eagles then proceeded to beat the Italia Shooters in the semi-final by a relatively hefty score of 3–0 with goals coming from Budalic, Braletic, and Milos Scepanovic. In the final Serbia used a 4-4-2 formation which finally gave them championship glory as they outlasted National Division champions Trois-Rivières Attak over a rain-drenched 120 minutes of extra time and penalty kicks to win the CSL championship 2–1 in the penalty shootout which was followed by a pitch invasion.

=== Consistent playoff contender (2009–2012) ===
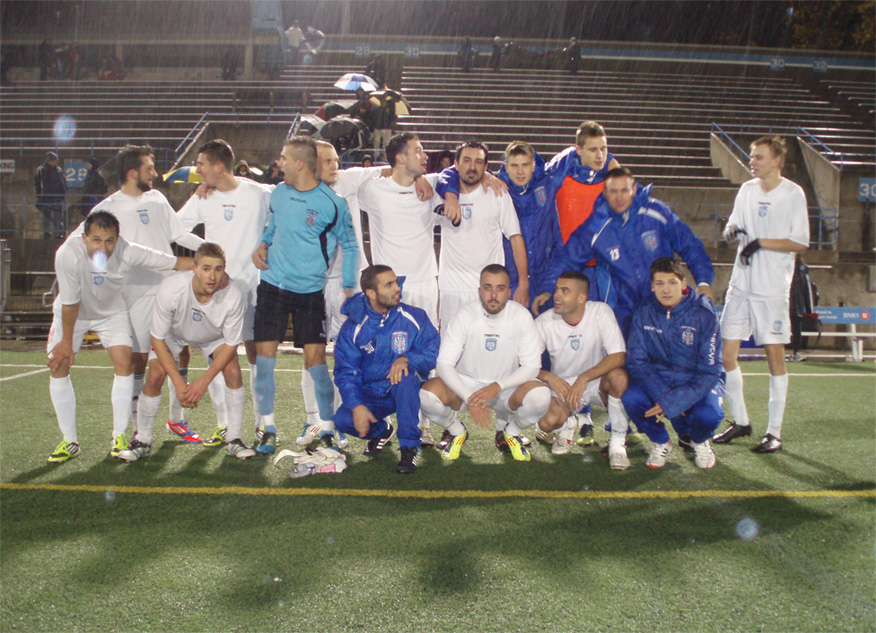
Celebrations after advancing to the 2012 semifinal.

In 2009, the club introduced a red jersey (blue was the secondary jersey in years previous), and hired the services of CSL Coach of the Year Rafael Carbajal. His roster was a mixture of seasoned veterans with several young prospects like Evan Milward, Selvin Lammie, and Jonathan Hurtis. Carbajal added more silverware to Serbia's cabinet as they claimed their third International Division title, while posting the league's best offensive record. Despite his success he fell out of favour with the team's management, and was released before the commencement of the postseason. His replacement was former Železničar Lajkovac forward and former head coach of Mačva Šabac Dušan "Duško" Prijić. In the initial stages of the playoffs the Eagles defeated TFC Academy 6–0 on aggregate. In the next round they defeated their rivals Toronto Croatia in order to have a repeat of the 2008 final against Trois-Rivières Attak. At the final game, playing a man short for most of the second half, Trois-Rivières took the game into overtime, then penalty kicks to win the CSL Championship at the BMO Field in Toronto on October 10, 2009. The game was scoreless through 90 minutes, then 30 minutes of overtime before Trois-Rivières outscored the Serbian White Eagles 3–2 in the penalty kick decider. At the conclusion of the season Viciknez received his second MVP award, while Medić won the Defender of the Year and Dan Pelc was named the Goalkeeper of the Year.

Former team captain Niki Budalic succeeded Prijić as head coach for the 2010 season. Notable additions were Miloš Kocić, Stefan Vukovic, Daniel Baston, Taylor Lord, and Shawn Brown. During the regular season Serbia finished second in the standings with the best defensive record. In the first round of the postseason Serbia for the first time since its return to the league failed to reach the championship final after suffering a defeat by the Brantford Galaxy. Though their senior team failed to claim any silverware their reserve team won the reserve championship title. Kocić was named the CSL Goalkeeper of the Year.

Uroš Stamatović retired and was elevated as the head coach and brought in Boris Miličić. The 2011 season saw a decline in their performance as they finished fifth in the standings, but still managed to clinch a playoff berth. In the first round they defeated Brampton City United, but were eliminated in the second round against Capital City F.C. In 2012, the club once again brought in seasoned internationals like Zoran Rajović, Vitomir Jelić, Aleksandar Stojanovski, Nikola Miodrag, Richard West, Ivan Stanković and goalkeeper Aleksandar Radosavljević. Serbia qualified for the postseason by finishing sixth in the standings. The Eagles made a good push beating a solid SC Toronto squad 1–0 in the quarterfinals only to implode 4–0 against Toronto Croatia in the next round, marking the second year in a row they were ousted in the semifinals.

=== Decline in performance and return to glory (2013–present) ===
The following two seasons Serbia struggled to achieve sufficient results as they barely qualified for the postseason, and saw first round defeats in the playoffs. In 2015, Serbia witnessed glory once more as they claimed the regular season title. In their playoff journey to reclaim the championship they defeated London City 1–0 with Branislav Vukomanović providing the goal. Their quest for the championship came to an end after a 3–2 defeat to SC Waterloo. Former team captain Mirko Medić was assigned the head coach position for the 2016 season. He secured them their 11th straight playoff berth by finishing fourth in the standings. Their road to the championship was marked with a 1–0 victory over Toronto Atomic FC with Milos Scepanovic recording the lone goal. In the second round they defeated FC Ukraine United 1–0 in order mark their sixth championship final appearance. Their opponents in the final were Hamilton City SC. During the match, Hamilton took the lead at the 14th minute with Serbia equalizing at the 59th minute to send the match to extra time where Scepanovic scored the winner to claim Serbia's second championship title (third including NSL titles).

In June 2020, the club signed a cooperation agreement with FK Sloboda Užice.

== Venue ==
The club initially played out of Stanley Park Stadium until 1973 when they moved to CNE Stadium for a season. From 1975 to 1979, the Serbian White Eagles played at Lamport Stadium.

Since being re-founded in 2006, the Serbian White Eagles have played their home games at Centennial Park Stadium in Etobicoke, the western portion of the city of Toronto. In 2014, they played their home games at Lamport Stadium but in 2015, they returned to Centennial Park. The entirety of the 2023 season was played at Mattamy Sports Park and Paramount Field in Mississauga while the 2025 season was played out of Esther Shiner Stadium in North York.

== Players ==
=== Current squad ===
As of September 28, 2025

Note: Flags indicate national team as defined under FIFA eligibility rules; some limited exceptions apply. Players may hold more than one non-FIFA nationality.

No.	Pos.	Nation	Player
2	MF	SRB	Nikola Timotijević
3	DF	SRB	Srđan Simović
4	DF	CAN	Dejan Jakovic (captain)
5	DF	CAN	Brandon Wellington
6	DF	SRB	Petar Planić
7	FW	SRB	Marko Stajić (vice-captain)
8	MF	SRB	Marko Krasić
10	MF	MNE	Nikola Đurković
11	DF	SRB	Branislav Vukomanović
14	DF	CAN	Stefan Pejic
15	DF	CAN	Danilo Bakoc
16	MF	JOR	Yasin Shahwan
18	DF	SRB	Marko Orošić
19	FW	SRB	Marko Pavićević
20	FW	GUY	Shaquille Agard
21	FW	SRB	Vladimir Strizović
22	GK	CAN	Andrew Shahrivar
23	DF	SRB	Ivan Ćendić
24	MF	SRB	Bojan Šišović
25	MF	SRB	Miroslav Jovanović
26	FW	SRB	Stefan Milošević
—	DF	CAN	Adrian Cann

No.	Pos.	Nation	Player
—	MF	CAN	Hassan Faisal
—	DF	SRB	Dejan Koraksić
—	MF	CAN	Nikola Milinkovic
—	DF	CAN	Nikola Pojic
—	MF	CAN	Luka Milidragovic
—	DF	CAN	Marc Jankovic
—	FW	CAN	Adam Waithe
—	MF	CAN	Dusan Kovacevic
—	FW	SRB	Miloš Mijatović
—	DF	CAN	Robert Boskovic
—	MF	CAN	Christopher Gaytan
—	MF	CAN	Khubaib Mahboubullah
—	MF	CAN	Sheikh Uzair Mehboob
—	GK	CAN	Daniel Gosciniak
—	MF	CAN	Noah MacIntyre
—	MF	BAN	Ekbal Hussain
—	MF	CAN	Luka Glamcevski
—	GK	CAN	Tayjon Campbell
—	MF	SLO	Gregor Žugelj
—	MF	NGR	Damilola Oladipo
—	MF	CAN	Malcolm Suaza
—	MF	CAN	Luka Lavrnic

=== Retired numbers ===
No.	Player	Nationality	Position	Years	Ref
9	Mike Stojanovic	Canada	Forward	1973–76	

=== Notable players ===
- (Canada) Said Ali
- (Canada) Mike Bakic
- (Canada) Obrad Bejatovic
- (Canada) Robert Boskovic
- (Canada) Niki Budalic
- (Canada) Adrian Cann
- (Canada) Daniel Chamale
- (Canada) Oscar Cordon
- (Canada) Tibor Gemeri
- (Canada) Alan Harvey
- (Canada) Dejan Jakovic
- (Canada) Milan Kojic
- (Canada) Tony Lawrence
- (Canada) Taylor Lord
- (Canada) Evan Milward
- (Canada) Nikola Paunic
- (Canada) John Smits
- (Canada) Mike Stojanovic
- (Canada) Stefan Vukovic
- (Canada) Carlos Zeballos
- (Socialist Federal Republic of Yugoslavia) Trifun Mihailović
- (Socialist Federal Republic of Yugoslavia) Ivan Mršić
- (Socialist Federal Republic of Yugoslavia) Josip Ognjanac
- (Socialist Federal Republic of Yugoslavia) Dragan Popović
- (Socialist Federal Republic of Yugoslavia) Šaban Romanović
- (Socialist Federal Republic of Yugoslavia) Dragoslav Šekularac
- (Socialist Federal Republic of Yugoslavia) Blagoje Tamindžić
- (Socialist Federal Republic of Yugoslavia) Miroslav Vardić
- (Serbia) Dušan Belić
- (Serbia) Dragan Dragutinović
- (Serbia) Milan Janošević
- (Serbia) Vitomir Jelić
- (Serbia) Đorđe Jocić
- (Serbia) Radenko Kamberović
- (Serbia) Miloš Kocić
- (Serbia) Dejan Koraksić
- (Serbia) Marko Krasić
- (Serbia) Marko Kostić
- (Serbia) Marko Marović
- (Serbia) Mirko Medić
- (Serbia) Dušan Mićić
- (Serbia) Boris Miličić
- (Serbia) Stefan Milošević
- (Serbia) Siniša Ninković
- (Serbia) Marko Pavićević
- (Serbia) Bojan Pavlović
- (Serbia) Zoran Pešić
- (Serbia) Petar Planić
- (Serbia) Uroš Predić
- (Serbia) Aleksandar Radosavljević
- (Serbia) Zoran Rajović
- (Serbia) Nemanja Simeunović
- (Serbia) Srđan Simović
- (Serbia) Uroš Stamatović
- (Serbia) Ivan Stanković
- (Serbia) Goran Švonja
- (Serbia) Božidar Tadić
- (Serbia) Adrian Tismenar
- (Serbia) Saša Viciknez
- (Serbia) Branislav Vukomanović
- (Serbia) Bojan Zoranović
- (Argentina) Pedro Kozak
- (Bangladesh) Ekbal Hussain
- (Bosnia and Herzegovina) Zoran Kokot
- (Bosnia and Herzegovina) Miloš Đurković
- (Brazil) Osni Neto
- (Bulgaria) Kiril Dimitrov
- (Denmark) Anders Yrfeldt
- (England) David Demaine
- (Guyana) Shaquille Agard
- (Republic of Ireland) John Dempsey
- (Jamaica) Ramon Bailey
- (Jamaica) Shawn Brown
- (Jamaica) Lascelles Dunkley
- (Jamaica) Richard West
- (Mexico) Ricardo Munguía
- (Montenegro) Nikola Đurković
- (Montenegro) Božo Milić
- (Montenegro) Dragan Radović
- (Montenegro) Bojan Šljivančanin
- (Nigeria) Prince Ihekwoaba
- (North Macedonia) Aleksandar Stojanovski
- (Romania) Daniel Baston
- (Saint Kitts and Nevis) Darryl Gomez
- (Saint Vincent and the Grenadines) Caswain Mason
- (Scotland) John Fahy
- (Scotland) Kevin Souter
- (Sierra Leone) John Trye
- (Slovenia) Gregor Žugelj
- (United States) Denny Vaninger

== Staff ==
=== Club management ===
As of March 19, 2025

Position	Name
President	Dragan Bakoč
Vice president	Predrag Milković
Treasurer	Miško Zdravković
Secretary	Mario Ostojić

=== Coaching and technical staff ===
As of August 12, 2026

Position	Name
Head coach	Uroš Stamatović
Goalkeeping coach	Bojan Vranić
Conditioning coach	Danijela Trajković
Physiotherapist	Vesna Altarac
Equipment manager	Blažo Ćurić

== Head coaches ==
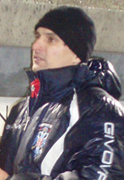
Uroš Stamatović, the longest serving head coach in the history of the club

Name	Years
(Socialist Federal Republic of Yugoslavia) Ratko "Ray" Dobrijević	1968–1969
(Canada) Alan Harvey	1970
(Socialist Federal Republic of Yugoslavia) Dragan Popović	1971–1972
(Socialist Federal Republic of Yugoslavia) Mladen Sarić	1973
(Socialist Federal Republic of Yugoslavia) Dragan Popović	1974–1975
(Socialist Federal Republic of Yugoslavia) Dragoslav Šekularac	1975
(Republic of Ireland) John Dempsey	1976
(Guinea-Bissau) Luis Dabo	1977
N/A	1978
(Socialist Federal Republic of Yugoslavia) Nikola Ivetić	1979–1980
(Serbia and Montenegro) (Serbia) Dragoslav Šekularac	2006
(Serbia) Dušan Belić	2007
(Serbia) Siniša Ninković	2007
(Serbia) Branko Pavlović	2007
(Serbia) Milan Čančarević	2008
(Uruguay) Rafael Carbajal	2009
(Serbia) Dušan Prijić	2009–2010
(Canada) Niki Budalic	2010
(Serbia) Mirko Medić	2011–2012
(Serbia) Uroš Stamatović	2012–2016
(Serbia) Mirko Medić	2016
(Serbia) Uroš Stamatović	2017
(Serbia) Milan Mijailović	2017
(Serbia) Uroš Stamatović	2018–2021
(Serbia) Zoran Rajović	2021–2022
(Serbia) Uroš Stamatović	2022–2023
(Serbia) Bojan Zoranović	2023–2025
(Serbia) Uroš Stamatović	2026–

== Shirt sponsors and manufacturers ==
Period	Kit manufacturer	Shirt sponsor
2006	Adidas	Pop's Caulking
2007	Puma	
2008	Lotto	Gaymer Cider
2009–10	Umbro	
2010	Diadora	
2011	Givova	
2012–14	Macron	
2015	Givova	
2016	Macron / Umbro	
2017–present	Givova	
2020–present	Seven Sportswear	

== Year-by-year ==
Year	League	Division	GP	W	L	T	Pts	Regular season	Playoffs
1968	NSL	Senior	Standings are unavailable						
1969	NSL	Senior	22	12	4	6	30	3rd	N/A
1970	NSL	Senior	26	17	4	5	39	3rd	N/A
1971	NSL	Senior	26	9	12	5	23	9th	Did not qualify
1972	NSL	Senior	26	20	5	3	43	2nd	Final
1973	NSL	Senior	30	22	7	1	45	2nd	Semi-finals
1974	NSL	Senior	36	28	1	7	63	1st	N/A
1975	NSL	First	38	23	8	7	53	4th	Did not qualify
1976	NSL	First	27	10	11	6	26	7th	Did not qualify
1977	NSL	First	36	0	29	7	7	10th	Relegated
1978	NSL	Senior	Withdrew						
1979	NSL	Senior	20	0	14	6	6	14th	Did not qualify
1980	NSL	Senior	22	1	18	3	5	12th	Did not qualify
2006	CSL	International	22	17	1	4	55	1st	Final
2007	CSL	International	22	14	5	3	45	1st	Final
2008	CSL	International	22	12	5	5	41	2nd	Champions
2009	CSL	International	18	11	4	3	36	1st	Final
2010	CSL	First	24	12	3	9	45	2nd	Quarter-finals
2011	CSL	First	26	13	6	7	46	5th	Semi-finals
2012	CSL	First	22	10	7	5	35	6th	Semi-finals
2013	CSL	First	22	8	12	2	26	8th	Quarter-finals
2014	CSL	First	18	6	7	5	23	6th	Quarter-finals
2015	CSL	First	22	16	2	4	52	1st	Semi-finals
2016	CSL	First	21	9	9	3	30	4th	Champions
2017	CSL	First	14	9	1	4	31	2nd	Semi-finals
2018	CSL	First	16	5	7	4	19	6th	Quarter-finals
2019	CSL	First	19	9	5	4	31	5th	Quarter-finals
2020	CSL	Senior	8	3	1	4	10	4th	Semi-finals
2021	CSL	Senior	7	3	4	0	9	5th	Semi-finals
2022	CSL	Senior	10	5	1	4	19	1st	Semi-finals
2023	CSL	Senior	12	9	3	0	27	2nd	N/A
2024	CSL	Senior	12	9	2	1	28	1st	N/A
2025	CSL	Senior	9	7	1	1	22	2nd	Final
2026	CSL	Senior	—	—	—	—	—	—	Final

== Honours ==
- Canadian Soccer League Championship

2008, 2016
Runner-up: 2006, 2007, 2009, 2025, 2026

- CSL International Division

2006, 2007, 2009

- CSL Regular Season

2015, 2022, 2024

- National Soccer League Championship

Runner-up: 1972

- NSL Regular Season

1974

- Canadian Open Cup

1974

- Royal Cup

2024, 2025

== Gallery ==
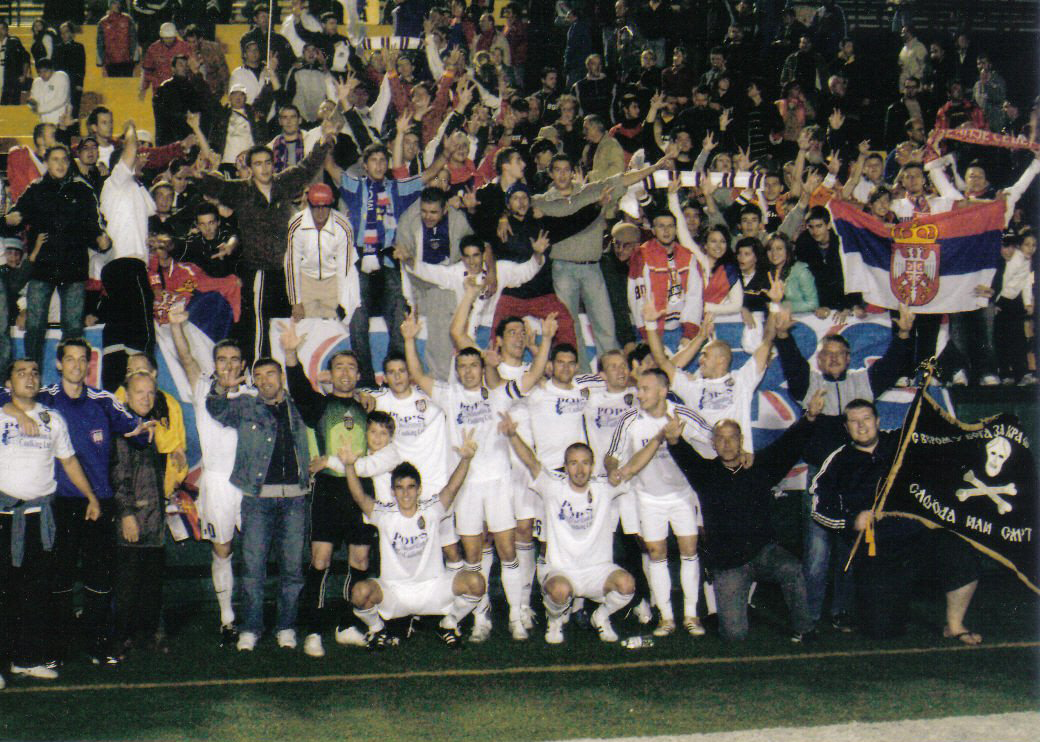
2006 celebration

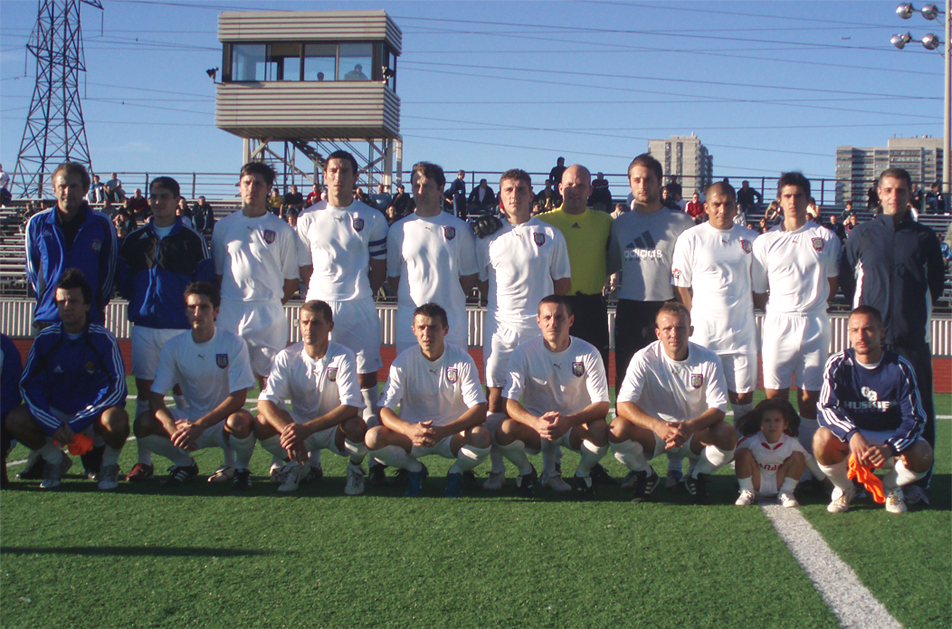
2007 squad

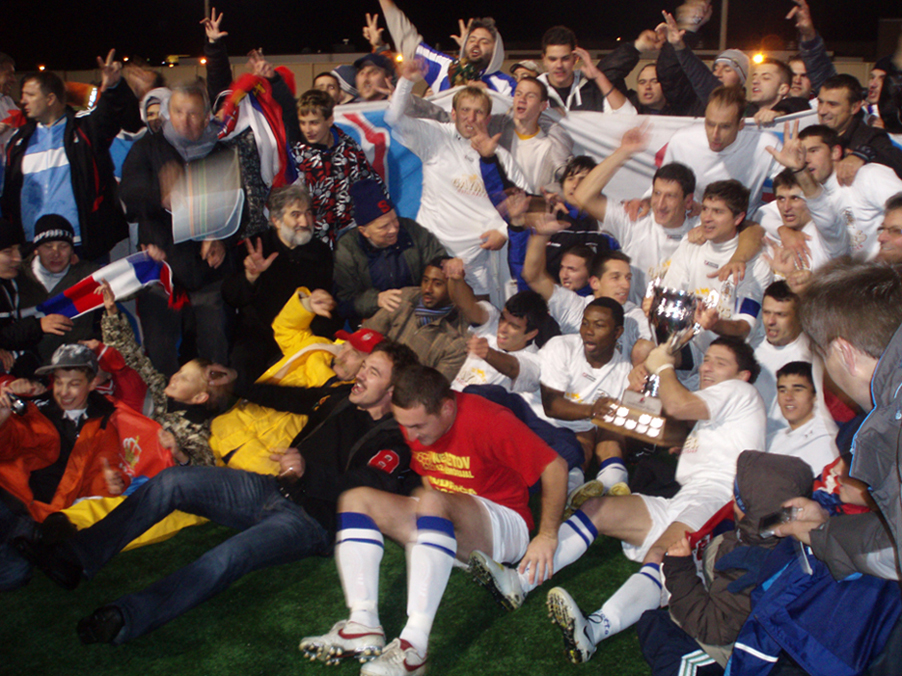
2008 championship final celebrations

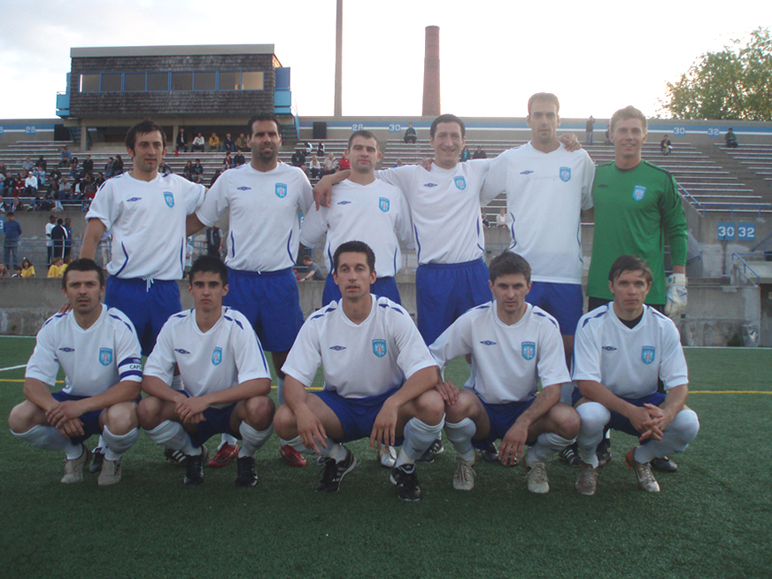
Starting eleven for the 2009 season opener

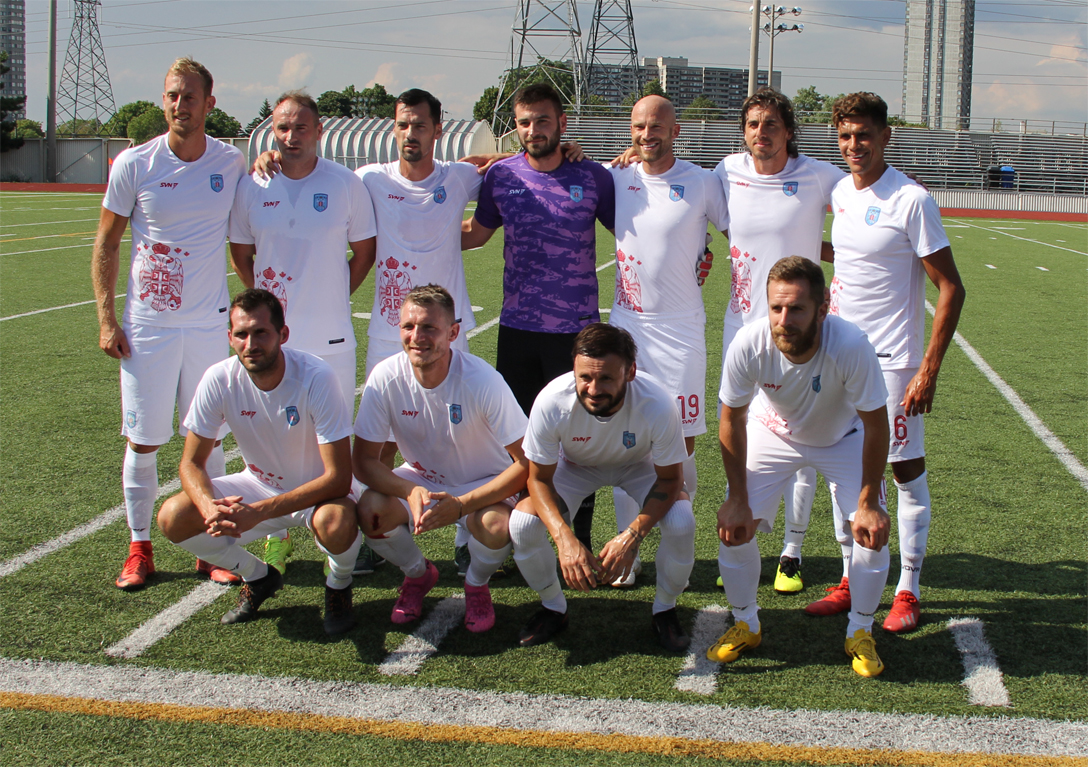
Starting eleven for the 2022 semifinal

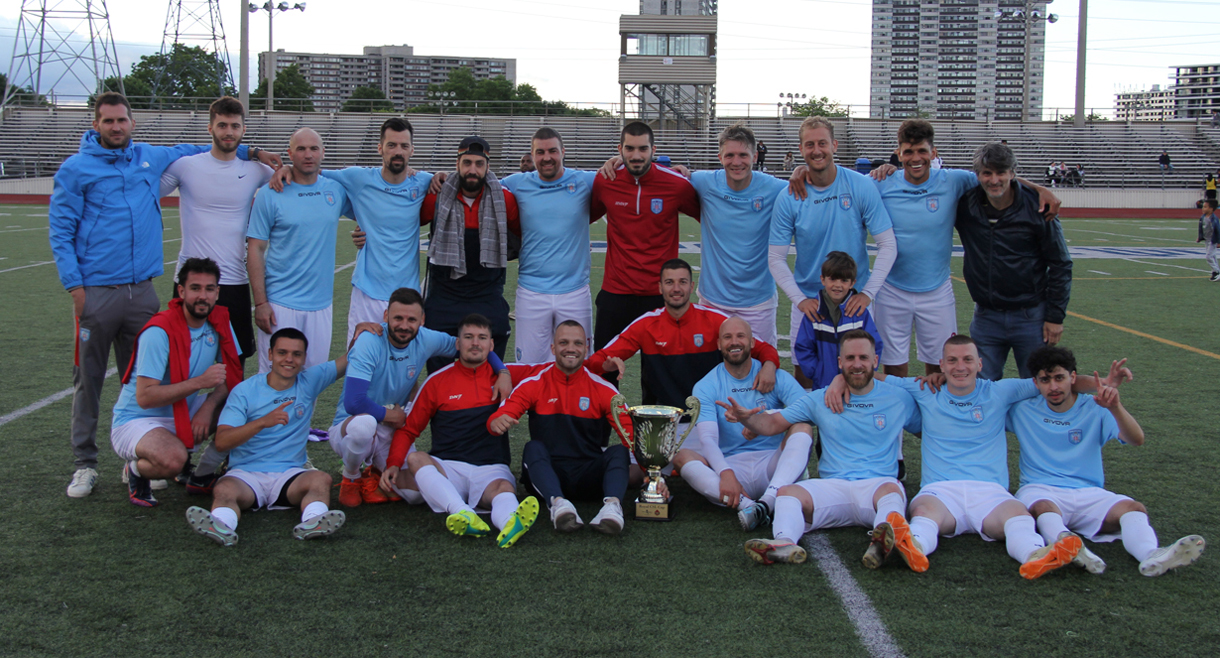
2024 Royal Cup final celebrations

== Notes ==
1. As player-coach.
2. The Serbian White Eagles were inactive for the season.
3. Standings are incomplete.
4. Competed under the name Toronto Serbians.
5. The Canadian Open Cup was a tournament organized by the National Soccer League in 1971 where the NSL champion would face the Challenge Trophy winners to determine the best team throughout the country. The 1974 edition served as a qualifier match to determine the Canadian representative to the CONCACAF Champions Cup. The Serbian White Eagles were the NSL representative for the 1974 competition while their opponents were the Calgary Springer Kickers, who were the Alberta Cup, and Challenge Trophy titleholders. The Serbian White Eagles won and advanced to the 1975 CONCACAF Champions' Cup.
