= 2024 Canadian Soccer League season =

Professional soccer league season

Canadian Soccer League
- Season: 2024
- Dates: June 14 – September 28 (regular season); October 6 – October 13 (playoffs)
- Regular season champions: Serbian White Eagles (6th title)
- Matches: 36
- Goals: 137 (3.81 per match)
- Top goalscorer: Nikola Timotijević (13)
- Biggest home win: Toronto Falcons 7–1 Hamilton City (July 27, 2024)
- Biggest away win: Spanish Future Stars 0–10 Scarborough SC (August 25, 2024)
- Longest winning run: 5 matches Scarborough SC
- Longest unbeaten run: 8 matches Scarborough SC
- Longest winless run: 9 matches Spanish Future Stars
- Longest losing run: 9 matches Spanish Future Stars

The 2024 Canadian Soccer League season was the 27th season under the Canadian Soccer League name. The season began with the Royal CSL Cup tournament on May 31, 2024, while the regular season officially started on June 14, 2024. The regular season concluded on September 28, 2024, with the Serbian White Eagles winning their sixth divisional title.

The playoffs were originally scheduled to commence on October 6, 2024, with the championship final set for October 13, 2024, but were canceled due to financial and venue issues for the second consecutive season.

== Summary ==
The season began with the second edition of the Royal CSL Cup tournament in honor of former league announcer Enio Perruzza. The final would consist of Scarborough SC and the Serbian White Eagles, with the Serbs winning the tournament. In the initial stages of the regular season, the Serbs would maintain the lead until midway through the season, with Scarborough defeating them to take the lead. Scarborough held the lead until the final match of the campaign. In the season's final game, a three-way tie between Scarborough, the Serbs, and the Toronto Falcons enabled them to claim the regular-season title. Ultimately, the White Eagles would secure the title by defeating Scarborough.

Originally, a postseason was scheduled, but for the second consecutive season, it was canceled due to financial and venue considerations.

== Changes from 2023 ==
Membership decreased from seven to six teams, with all three expansion sides, Dynamo Toronto, Ooty Black Pearl, and Weston United not returning. New additions to the competition were ethnically associated expansion sides, Future Spanish Stars, and Unity FC. Originally, the league was set to begin with only four club members as the remainder of the teams failed to uphold their financial obligations. Therefore, the Royal CSL Cup tournament was contested between Scarborough SC, Serbian White Eagles, and the two expansion franchises. However, Hamilton City and the Toronto Falcons were later reinstated as league members for the regular season and playoffs. All the league matches were scheduled in Toronto at Esther Shiner Stadium and Rob Ford Stadium.

== Teams ==
Team	City	Stadium	Manager
Spanish Future Stars	Toronto, Ontario	Esther Shiner Stadium Rob Ford Stadium	Juan Carlos Mina
Hamilton City	Hamilton, Ontario	Esther Shiner Stadium Rob Ford Stadium	Radoš Batizić Zdravko Lalatovic
Scarborough SC	Toronto, Ontario	Esther Shiner Stadium Rob Ford Stadium	Zoran Knežević
Serbian White Eagles	Toronto, Ontario	Esther Shiner Stadium Rob Ford Stadium	Bojan Zoranović
Toronto Falcons	Toronto, Ontario	Esther Shiner Stadium Rob Ford Stadium	Maksym Rohovskyi
Unity FC	Toronto, Ontario	Esther Shiner Stadium Rob Ford Stadium	Douglas Nassif

== Standings ==
Pos	Team	Pld	W	D	L	GF	GA	GD	Pts	Qualification
1	Serbian White Eagles (X)	12	9	1	2	30	10	+20	28	~~Playoff semifinals~~
2	Scarborough SC	12	8	2	2	36	9	+27	26	~~Playoff semifinals~~
3	Toronto Falcons	12	8	2	2	31	8	+23	26	~~Playoff semifinals~~
4	Unity FC	12	3	1	8	14	26	−12	10	~~Playoff semifinals~~
5	Hamilton City	12	2	1	9	15	41	−26	7	
6	Spanish Future Stars	12	2	1	9	11	43	−32	7	

Source: []
Rules for classification: 1) points; 2) total wins; 3) head-to-head points; 4) goal differential; 5) most goals
(X) Regular season champion

== Royal CSL Cup ==
The 2024 Royal CSL Cup was a tournament in honour of former league announcer Enio Perruzza, who died in 2021.

=== Semifinals ===
May 31, 2024	Serbian White Eagles	12–0	Spanish Future Stars	Toronto, Ontario
20:00	Vladimir Strizović 31', 47', 31'; Đurković 10'; Miloš Mijatović 22'; Bojan Šišović 55'; Pavićević 63', 78', 83' (pen.); Nikola Timotijević 70', 75', 87'	Report		Stadium: Rob Ford Stadium

June 2, 2024	Scarborough SC	3–0	Unity FC	Toronto, Ontario
18:00	Amadeo 3'; Junior Santana 65'; Petar Đjorđjević 91'	Report		Stadium: Esther Shiner Stadium

=== Finals ===
June 9, 2024	Serbian White Eagles	2–1	Scarborough SC	Toronto, Ontario
18:00	Pavićević 20', 33'	Report	Petar Đorđević 65'	Stadium: Esther Shiner Stadium; Referee: Yurii Ponomarov

== Notes ==
1. The playoffs did not occur due to financial and venue considerations.
