= 2025 Canadian Soccer League season =

Professional soccer league season

Canadian Soccer League
- Season: 2025
- Dates: June 22 – September 13 (regular season); September 21 – September 28 (playoffs)
- Champions: Scarborough SC (3rd title)
- Regular season champions: Scarborough SC (3rd title)
- Matches: 18
- Goals: 137 (7.61 per match)
- Top goalscorer: Devroy Grey, Erick Hernández (8)
- Biggest home win: Scarborough SC 16–0 Aeem Canada FC (September 13, 2025)
- Biggest away win: Aeem Canada FC 1–7 Serbian White Eagles (September 6, 2025)
- Longest winning run: 3 matches Scarborough SC; Serbian White Eagles
- Longest unbeaten run: 6 matches Scarborough SC
- Longest winless run: 9 matches Aeem Canada FC
- Longest losing run: 9 matches Aeem Canada FC

The 2025 Canadian Soccer League season was the 28th season under the Canadian Soccer League name. The season began with the Royal CSL Cup tournament on June 8, 2025, while the regular season officially started on June 22, 2025. The regular season concluded on September 13, 2025, with Scarborough SC winning its third divisional title.

The playoffs began on September 21, 2025, with the championship match played on September 28, 2025. In the championship final, Scarborough won their third title by defeating the Serbian White Eagles.

== Summary ==
The season began with the third edition of the Royal CSL Cup tournament in honor of former league announcer Enio Perruzza. The Serbian White Eagles defended their title by defeating Scarborough SC in the finals. Their rivalry would continue throughout the regular season, with the Serbs leading the standings in the first three rounds. Their lead was challenged when Scarborough defeated the Serbs, which tied the standings of both teams. Scarborough would maintain the lead for the majority of the season due to a higher goal difference. Near the final stages of the regular season, the Serbs had an opportunity to retake the lead, but tied the match against Scarborough. The winners of the divisional title were decided on the final match of the season, where both teams won their games, with the title going to Scarborough due to a higher goal difference.

After two seasons without the playoffs, the league reinstated the format with all four teams qualifying. In the preliminary round, Scarborough defeated expansion side Aeem Canada, while the Serbs defeated Unity FC. In the championship final, Scarborough secured a league double by defeating the White Eagles.

== Changes from 2024 ==
Membership in the league decreased from six to four teams. Aeem Canada FC was the sole addition to the league, with Hamilton City, Spanish Future Stars, and the Toronto Falcons not returning. It was decided at the annual general meeting that several clubs were excluded from the competition due to unpaid league fees. All the league matches were scheduled in Toronto at Esther Shiner Stadium.

== Teams ==
Team	City	Stadium	Manager
Aeem Canada FC	Toronto, Ontario	Esther Shiner Stadium	Kebe Al Elinkine Wahid
Scarborough SC	Toronto, Ontario	Esther Shiner Stadium	Kiril Dimitrov
Serbian White Eagles	Toronto, Ontario	Esther Shiner Stadium	Bojan Zoranović
Unity FC	Toronto, Ontario	Esther Shiner Stadium	Douglas Nassif

=== Coaching changes ===
Team	Outgoing coach	Manner of departure	Date of vacancy	Position in table	Incoming coach	Date of appointment
Scarborough SC	Zoran Knežević	Replaced	June 15, 2025	preseason	Kiril Dimitrov	June 16, 2025

== Standings ==
Pos	Team	Pld	W	D	L	GF	GA	GD	Pts	Qualification
1	Scarborough SC (X)	9	7	1	1	40	5	+35	22	Playoff semifinals
2	Serbian White Eagles	9	7	1	1	37	8	+29	22	Playoff semifinals
3	Unity FC	9	3	0	6	23	23	0	9	Playoff semifinals
4	Aeem Canada FC	9	0	0	9	10	38	−28	0	Playoff semifinals

Rules for classification: 1) points; 2) total wins; 3) head-to-head points; 4) goal differential; 5) most goals
(X) Regular season champion

== Playoffs ==
=== Semifinals ===
September 21, 2025	Scarborough SC	3–1	Aeem Canada FC	Toronto, Ontario
14:00	Baquero; Grey; Gonzalo Matias	Report	Duresa Shubisa	Stadium: Esther Shiner Stadium

September 21, 2025	Serbian White Eagles	6–1	Unity FC	Toronto, Ontario
16:00	Nikola Timotijević, Hussain, Luka Glamcevski; Simović	Report	Nelson Padillo	Stadium: Esther Shiner Stadium

=== Finals ===
September 28, 2025	Scarborough SC	1–0	Serbian White Eagles	Toronto, Ontario
19:00	Baquero 36'	Report		Stadium: Esther Shiner Stadium; Referee: Timur Qayoumi

== Royal CSL Cup ==
The 2025 Royal CSL Cup was the third tournament in honour of former league announcer Enio Perruzza, who died in 2021.

=== Semi-finals ===
June 8, 2025	Serbian White Eagles	2–0 (ff)	Aeem Canada FC	Toronto, Ontario
6:00 p.m.		Report		Stadium: Esther Shiner Stadium
Note: Aeem Canada forfeited after failing to meet an extended deadline for kickoff

June 8, 2025	Scarborough SC	4–0	Unity FC	Toronto, Ontario
8:00 p.m.	Deva St 28'; Santana 32'; Daniel 64'; Hamiri 78'	Report		Stadium: Esther Shiner Stadium

=== Finals ===
June 15, 2025	Serbian White Eagles	2–0	Scarborough SC	Toronto, Ontario
18:00	Pavićević 30', 71'	Report		Stadium: Esther Shiner Stadium; Referee: Ranee Arpati

== Season statistics ==
=== Goals ===
Rank	Player	Club	Goals
1	Devroy Grey	Scarborough SC	8
1	Erick Hernández	Unity FC	8
2	Nikola Timotijević	Serbian White Eagles	7
2	Gonzalo Matias	Scarborough SC	7
3	Petar Đorđević	Scarborough SC	6
3	Talhah Alikhan	Unity FC	6
4	Yohannes Amare	Aeem Canada FC	5
4	Marko Pavićević	Serbian White Eagles	5
4	Andy Baquero	Scarborough SC	5
5	Marko Krasić	Serbian White Eagles	4
5	Ekbal Hussain	Serbian White Eagles	4
5	Junior Santana	Scarborough SC	4
5	Artur Salamanka	Unity FC	4
