= List of foreign Canadian Soccer League players =

This is a list of foreign players in the Canadian Soccer League (formally Canadian Professional Soccer League), which commenced play in 1998. The following players must meet the following criteria:

1. Are considered foreign, i.e. outside Canada, determined by the following:

A player is considered foreign if he is not eligible to play for the national team of Canada.

More specifically,

- If a player has been capped on international level, the national team is used; if he has been capped by more than one country, the highest level (or the most recent) team is used. These include Canadian players with dual citizenship.
- If a player has not been capped on international level, his country of birth is used, except those who were born abroad from Canadian parents, or moved to Canada at a young age, and those who clearly indicated to have switched his nationality to another nation.

In bold: players who have played in the CSL in the current season (2025 Canadian Soccer League) and are still at the clubs for which they have played.

== Africa (CAF) ==
=== Angola ===
- Edgar Bartolomeu – North York Astros, Brampton Hitmen – 1998, 2001
- Filipe Bento – Vaughan Shooters – 2004
- Luis Cazengue – Toronto Supra – 2002
- Adam Shaban – Kingston FC, Milton SC – 2014, 2014–15

=== Burkina Faso ===
- Urbain Some – Ottawa Wizards – 2002–03
- Sa Brahima Traore – Ottawa Wizards, Oakville Blue Devils – 2002–03, 2005–06

=== Cameroon ===
- Stephane Assengue – Kingston FC – 2014–15
- Huffman Eja-Tabe – Oakville Blue Devils – 2006
- William Etchu Tabi – London City, Burlington SC – 2012, 2013

=== Central African Republic ===
- **Moussa Limane** – Scarborough SC, Hamilton City, Scarborough SC – 2020–2022, 2023, 2025–

=== Gambia ===
- Amadou Sanyang – TFC Academy – 2009

=== Ghana ===
- Fuseini Dauda – Hamilton Thunder – 2005

=== Liberia ===
- Preston Corporal – Hamilton Croatia, Brantford Galaxy, Niagara United – 2010, 2012, 2013
- Patrick Gerhardt – Brantford Galaxy – 2010
- Worteh Sampson – Windsor Border Stars – 2006

=== Malawi ===
- Peter Mponda – Ottawa Wizards – 2002–03
- McDonald Yobe – Ottawa Wizards – 2003

=== Morocco ===
- Hicham Aâboubou – Laval Dynamites, Trois-Rivières Attak – 2006, 2007
- Rachid Madkour – Laval Dynamites, Trois-Rivières Attak – (2005, 2006), 2007

=== Namibia ===
- Maleagi Ngarizemo – North York Astros – 2012

=== Nigeria ===
- Prince Ihekwoaba – Serbian White Eagles – 2008

=== Sierra Leone ===
- John Trye – Scarborough SC, Serbian White Eagles, Dynamo Toronto – 2017–2020, 2021–2023, 2024

=== South Africa ===
- Ryan Gamble – Toronto Supra, Oakville Blue Devils – 2001–02, 2005

=== South Sudan ===
- **Edmond Amadeo** – Real Mississauga SC, **Scarborough SC** – 2018–19, 2023–

== Asia (AFC) ==
=== Bangladeshi ===
- **Ekbal Hussain** – **Serbian White Eagles** – 2025–

=== Chinese Taipei ===
- Emilio Estevez Tsai – SC Waterloo Region – 2018

=== Hong Kong ===
- Michael Luk – Portugal FC – 2009

=== Iran ===
- Nader Mirahmadian – Mississauga Eagles – 1998

=== Syria ===
- Molham Babouli – FC Ukraine United – 2019

== Europe (UEFA) ==
=== Albania ===
- Isa Bulku – London City – 2003
- Gentian Buzali – Toronto Croatia, London City SC – 2000, 2001–03, 2010
- Arlind Ferhati – Real Mississauga SC – 2019
- Blerim Rrustemi – Toronto Supra – 2000–01
- Ervin Ryta – Toronto Croatia, London City SC – 2000, 2003
- Eris Tafaj – London City SC – 2003–05, 2006, 2011

=== Belarus ===
- Leonid Khankevich – Dynamo Toronto – 2023
- Valentin Radevich – Montreal Impact Academy – 2010–13

=== Bosnia and Herzegovina ===
- Zvonko Bakula – Brantford Galaxy, London City – 2010–11, 2012–13
- Željko Đokić – Brantford Galaxy – 2018–20
- Miloš Đurković – Serbian White Eagles – 2010–12
- Haris Fazlagić – Brantford Galaxy, SC Waterloo Region, London City, Hamilton City, Milton SC – 2010, 2012–14, 2014, 2016, 2016–17
- Faris Efendić – Milton SC, Toronto Croatia, CSC Mississauga – 2015, 2015, 2018
- Jure Glavina – Toronto Croatia, SC Waterloo Region – 2015, 2017
- Ranko Golijanin – Brantford Galaxy, London City SC, SC Waterloo Region – 2010–11, 2012, 2012, 2013–15
- Adis Hasečić – SC Waterloo Region, Scarborough SC, SC Waterloo Region – 2012–15, 2016, 2017–19
- Ferid Idrizović – Brantford Galaxy – 2011
- Stanko Karačić – Brantford Galaxy – 2010–11
- Zoran Kokot – Serbian White Eagles, Hamilton City – 2007, 2020
- Edin Kozica – London City – 2015
- Mladen Kukrika – Scarborough SC – 2015–16
- Armin Mahović – Brantford Galaxy – 2015
- Aleksandar Malbašić – Scarborough SC – 2015
- Vladimir Markotić – Brantford Galaxy, London City – 2010–11, 2012–15
- Slobodan Milanović – SC Waterloo Region – 2015
- Predrag Papaz – SC Waterloo Region, Burlington SC, Milton SC – 2013, 2014, 2015
- Zoran Rajović – Serbian White Eagles, Scarborough SC – 2012, 2018–20
- Haris Redžepi – Brantford Galaxy, Hamilton City – (2015–16, 2018), 2019–20
- Saša Vidović – Brantford Galaxy – 2011, 2015–16
- Petar Vukadin – CSC Mississauga, Scarborough SC – 2019, 2022– 2023
- Vlado Zadro – Toronto Croatia – 2015

=== Bulgaria ===
- Dimitar Atanasov – Real Mississauga SC – 2018
- Krum Bibishkov – Brantford Galaxy, Scarborough SC, Real Mississauga SC – 2016, 2017, 2018
- Kiril Dimitrov – Serbian White Eagles, SC Waterloo Region, Scarborough SC – 2009–13, 2014, 2015–2022
- Zdravko Karadachki – Scarborough SC – 2016–17
- Dimitar Koemdzhiev – Brantford Galaxy, Real Mississauga SC – 2016–17, 2018
- Dobrin Orlovski – Scarborough SC – 2015–16

=== Croatia ===
- Aljoša Asanović – Toronto Croatia – 2001
- Blazenko Bekavac – Hamilton Thunder – 2004
- Luka Bešenić – Brantford Galaxy – 2015–16
- Domagoj Bešlić – Hamilton Croatia – 2010
- Josip Bonacin – Toronto Croatia – 2012
- Velimir Crljen – Toronto Croatia – 2000, 2002–06
- Petar Dajak – Hamilton Thunder – 2003
- Lazo Džepina – Hamilton Thunder – 2005
- Dražen Gović – Brantford Galaxy – 2010
- Goran Grubesic – Toronto Croatia – 2003
- Zdenko Jurčević – Brantford Galaxy, Hamilton City SC – 2015, 2016
- Josip Juric – Toronto Croatia – 2002
- Saša Milaimović – Hamilton Thunder – 2004
- Jure Pavic – Toronto Croatia – 2003, 2006
- Ante Pavlović – Toronto Croatia – 2004–05
- Tonći Pirija – Toronto Croatia, London City SC – 2008–12, 2013
- Krešimir Prgomet – Toronto Croatia – 2014
- Ivica Raguž – Toronto Croatia – 2003
- Ivan Razumović – Hamilton Croatia – 2010
- Zoran Roglić – Brantford Galaxy – 2010
- Andelo Srzentic – Toronto Croatia – 2012
- Marijan Vuka – Burlington SC – 2014
- Marko Zelenika – Hamilton City SC – 2018–19
- Ivan Žgela – Toronto Croatia – 2009, 2010
- Ante Živković – Toronto Croatia – 2014
- Antonijo Zupan – Toronto Croatia, Hamilton Croatia, SC Toronto – (2003–06, 2009), 2010, 2011
- Mario Župetić – Hamilton Thunder, Toronto Croatia – 2003, 2003
- Ante Zurak – Toronto Croatia – 2010

=== Czech Republic ===
- Lukáš Bajer – Kingston FC – 2014
- Antonín Plachý – Toronto Supra – 2002
- Jaroslav Tesař – Kingston FC – 2013–14

=== England ===
- Darren Baxter – Oakville Blue Devils – 2005
- Thomas Beattie – London City SC – 2010–11
- Stephen Hindmarch – Kingston FC – 2014
- Hector Mackie – York Region Shooters – 2014–15
- Jason Massie – Kingston FC – 2013
- Aaron Steele – Hamilton Thunder, Oakville Blue Devils – 2003, 2005
- Darren Tilley – Mississauga Olympians – 2002–03

=== France ===
- Cédric Joqueviel – Trois-Rivières Attak – 2007

=== Georgia ===
- Nemo Shelia – Toronto Falcons – 2024

=== Germany ===
- Mélé Temguia – Montreal Impact Academy – 2012

=== Greece ===
- Theofanis Sotiris – York Region Shooters – 2017

=== Hungary ===
- Krisztián Kollega – Mississauga Eagles FC – 2012
- Attila Kovacs – Mississauga Eagles P.S.C. – 1998
- Péter Tereánszki-Tóth – Hamilton Croatia – 2010

=== Israel ===
- Alon Badat – North York Astros, SC Toronto, Scarborough SC – 2009, 2010–12, 2016
- Fadi Salback – FC Vorkuta – 2019

=== Italy ===
- Emanuele Ameltonis – York Region Shooters – 2012–17

=== Kosovo ===
- Tony Preci – Toronto Croatia – 2000

=== Macedonia ===
- Aleksandar Stojanovski – Serbian White Eagles, York Region Shooters – 2012, 2015–16

=== Montenegro ===
- Todor Babović – SC Waterloo Region – 2019
- Luka Bojić – Serbian White Eagles – 2016–2019
- **Nikola Đurković – Serbian White Eagles – 2022–**
- Dejan Gluščević – North York Astros – 2001–02
- Božo Milić – Serbian White Eagles – 2006
- Dragan Radović – Serbian White Eagles – 2006–09
- Bojan Šljivančanin – Serbian White Eagles – 2015

=== Northern Ireland ===
- Ryan McCurdy – Kingston FC – 2012–14
- Paul Munster – London City SC – 2004

=== Poland ===
- Jurek Gebczynski – London City SC – 1998–00
- Czesław Zajac – Toronto Croatia – 1998–99

=== Republic of Ireland ===
- Aidan O'Keeffe – Hamilton Croatia – 2010

=== Romania ===
- Andrei Bădescu – Trois-Rivières Attak – 2009–10
- Daniel Baston – Serbian White Eagles – 2009–10
- Christian Dragoi – Windsor Border Stars, London City SC – 2011–13, 2015
- Mircea Ilcu – Trois-Rivières Attak, Montreal Impact Academy – 2009, 2010
- Cătălin Lichioiu – Kingston FC – 2013–14

=== Russia ===
- Boris Krimus – North York Astros – 2003–06
- Platon Krivoshchyokov – North York Astros – 2000
- Andrei Malychenkov – North York Astros – 2000–04
- Vitaliy Sidorov – Kingston FC – 2012

=== Scotland ===
- Steven McDougall – York Region Shooters – 2015–16
- Kevin Souter – Serbian White Eagles – 2011
- Ryan Thomson – London City SC – 2000
- Paul Willis – Kingston FC – 2014

=== Serbia ===
- Miodrag Anđelković – Brantford Galaxy – 2010
- Nenad Begović – Brantford Galaxy, London City SC – 2010–12, 2012–13
- Dušan Belić – Serbian White Eagles – 2006–07
- Zoran Belošević – Milton SC, London City SC – 2015, 2015
- Miroslav Bjeloš – Burlington SC – 2013–14
- Dragan Dragutinović – Serbian White Eagles – 2013–16
- Radovan Ivković – Milton SC – 2015
- Milan Janošević – Serbian White Eagles – 2006–11
- Vladimir Jašić – London City SC – 2015
- Vitomir Jelić – Serbian White Eagles – 2012–20
- Đorđe Jočić – Serbian White Eagles – 2016–20
- Ivan Jurisic – North York Astros, Brampton Hitmen – 1998–99, 2001–04
- Radenko Kamberović – Serbian White Eagles – 2015–20
- Zoran Knežević – Scarborough SC – 2018–2022
- Miloš Kocić – Serbian White Eagles – 2010
- Darko Kolić – Trois-Rivières Attak – 2007
- Ivan Kostić – Hamilton City – 2024
- **Marko Krasić** – **Serbian White Eagles** – 2015, 2022–
- Igor Krmar – London City, Hamilton City – 2015, 2016
- **Nikola Lazović** – **Scarborough SC** – 2021–
- Marko Marović – Serbian White Eagles – 2016–20
- Mirko Medić – Serbian White Eagles, Brampton City United – (2006–12, 2014–15), 2013
- Dušan Mićić – Serbian White Eagles – 2019–2021
- Boris Miličić – Serbian White Eagles, North York Astros, Scarborough SC, Brantford Galaxy – 2011–13, 2014, 2015, 2015–16
- Dalibor Mitrović – Brantford Galaxy, London City SC – 2011–12, 2012
- Stefan Mitrović – Hamilton City – 2018–19
- Nenad Nikolić – London City SC, Burlington SC, Brantford Galaxy – 2012, 2013–15, 2016
- Siniša Ninković – Serbian White Eagles – 2006
- Rade Novković – Brantford Galaxy, London City SC – 2011–12, 2012–15
- Bojan Pavlović – Serbian White Eagles – 2018
- Ivan Perić – Brampton United – 2015
- Zoran Pešić – Burlington SC, Serbian White Eagles – 2015, 2016–2021
- Dušan Popović – Milton SC – 2015
- Igor Prostran – Oakville Blue Devils – 2005
- Uroš Predić – Serbian White Eagles – 2006
- **Neven Radaković** – **Scarborough SC** – 2018–
- Aleksandar Radosavljević – Serbian White Eagles – 2012–13
- Dejan Ristić – Brantford Galaxy – 2015–16
- Momčilo Rudan – Scarborough SC – 2018–20
- Stefan Rudan – Scarborough SC – 2018–20
- Uroš Stamatović – Serbian White Eagles – 2007–10
- Ivan Stanković – Serbian White Eagles – 2012–20
- Bojan Stepanović – Burlington SC, Brantford Galaxy – 2014–15, 2016–19
- Nenad Simić – Burlington SC – 2014
- Boban Stojanović – London City – 2012–13
- Aleksandar Stojiljković– SC Waterloo Region, Scarborough SC – 2014–15, 2016–2022
- Goran Švonja – Serbian White Eagles – 2016–20
- Božidar Tadić – Serbian White Eagles – 2019–21
- Saša Viciknez – Serbian White Eagles – 2006–12
- Nikola Vignjević – Metro Lions – 2003
- Vladimir Vujasinović – Burlington SC, Milton SC – 2013–14, 2016
- Vladimir Vujović – Burlington SC – 2015
- Đorđe Vukobrat – Hamilton City – 2019–2024
- Branislav Vukomanović – London City SC, Serbian White Eagles – 2013–14, 2014–2021
- Vladimir Zelenbaba – SC Waterloo Region, Scarborough SC – 2012–15, 2017–19, 2020–2024
- Mladen Zeljković – SC Waterloo Region – 2015
- Bojan Zoranović – CSC Mississauga, Scarborough SC, Serbian White Eagles – 2018, 2019, 2020–2023

=== Slovakia ===
- Erik Ľupták – North York Astros – 2014

=== Slovenia ===
- Gregor Žugelj – SC Waterloo Region, St. Catharines Hrvat – 2018–19, 2021

=== Spain ===
- Xavi Pérez – York Region Shooters – 2012–14

=== Ukraine ===
- **Kiril Antonenko** – FC Ukraine United, FC Vorkuta B, **Toronto Falcons** – 2017, 2018, 2022–
- Andriy Bandrivskyi – FC Ukraine United – 2018–19
- Mykhaylo Basarab – Toronto Atomic FC – 2015–16
- Said Belmokhtar – FC Vorkuta, Kingsman SC, FC Vorkuta – 2018, 2019, 2021
- Mykhaylo Berezovyi – CSC Mississauga, FC Vorkuta – 2018, 2020
- Volodymyr Bidlovskyi – FC Vorkuta – 2018–20
- Vitaliy Bohdanov – FC Ukraine United – 2018
- **Bohdan Borovskyi** – **FC Vorkuta** – 2019–
- Bogdan Bortnik – FC Vorkuta, Kingsman SC – 2017, 2019
- Roman Botvynnyk – CSC Mississauga – 2018–19
- Mykhailo Bulkin – FC Ukraine United, FC Vorkuta – 2016, 2017
- Pavlo Chornomaz – FC Vorkuta, Dynamo Toronto – 2019–2022, 2023
- Vasyl Chornyi – FC Ukraine United – 2017–19
- Andriy Dankiv – Toronto Atomic FC – 2015–16
- Roman Datsiuk – FC Ukraine United – 2018
- Kostyantyn Derevlyov – FC Ukraine United – 2016
- Vitaliy Dnistryan – FC Ukraine United, FC Vorkuta II – 2016, 2017
- Denis Dyachenko – FC Vorkuta, Kingsman SC, Toronto Falcons – 2017–18, 2019, 2022–2024
- Sviatoslav Dziadykevych – FC Ukraine United, Toronto Falcons – 2019, 2023
- Yevhen Falkovskyi – FC Ukraine United – 2017–18
- **Vadym Gostiev** – FC Ukraine United, FC Vorkuta, **Toronto Falcons** – 2016, 2017–21, 2022–
- Valery Haidarzhi – FC Vorkuta – 2017–19
- Lyubomyr Halchuk – FC Ukraine United, FC Vorkuta – 2016, 2017–21
- **Maksym Hramm** – FC Vorkuta II, Kingsman SC, **Toronto Falcons** – 2017–2018, 2019, 2022–
- Mykola Hreshta – FC Ukraine United – 2016–18
- Taras Hromyak – FC Ukraine United – 2017–18
- Mykhailo Hurka – FC Ukraine United – 2016–19
- Ihor Ilkiv – Toronto Atomic FC – 2015
- Lubomyr Ivansky – FC Ukraine United – 2016–18
- **Sergiy Ivliev** – FC Ukraine United, **FC Vorkuta** – 2016, 2017–
- **Stanislav Katana** – Toronto Atomic FC, Kingsman SC, **Toronto Falcons** – 2015–16, 2019, 2022–
- Oleh Kerchu – FC Ukraine United, FC Vorkuta – 2016, 2017–18
- Vitaliy Kolyesnikov – CSC Mississauga, FC Dynamo Toronto – 2018–19, 2023
- Andriy Kondzyolka – FC Ukraine United – 2017
- Vladimir Koval – Mississauga Eagles P.S.C., Toronto Croatia, North York Astros, FC Ukraine United – 1998, (1999, 2001), 2000, 2017
- **Hryhoriy Krasovsky** – FC Vorkuta, Kingsman SC, **FC Vorkuta** – 2017, 2019, 2021–
- Taras Kryvyi – FC Ukraine United – 2019
- Ivan Kucherenko – FC Ukraine United – 2017–19
- Roman Kukharskyi – FC Ukraine United – 2019
- **Oleksandr Kvachov** – **FC Dynamo** **Toronto** – 2023–
- **Oleksandr Lakusta** – FC Vorkuta, **Toronto Falcons** – 2017–19, 2022–
- Danylo Lazar – FC Ukraine United, FC Vorkuta – 2016, 2017
- Andriy Lemishevsky – FC Ukraine United, FC Vorkuta II – 2016, 2017
- Pavlo Lukyanets – FC Ukraine United – 2017–19
- Nazar Lytvyn – FC Ukraine United – 2016–17
- Ihor Malysh – FC Ukraine United – 2018
- **Ihor Melnyk** – Toronto Atomic FC, **FC Vorkuta** – 2015–16, 2018–
- Ihor Mihalevskyi – Toronto Atomic FC – 2015–16
- Nazar Milishchuk – FC Ukraine United – 2018–19
- Vitaliy Mishchenko – North York Astros – 2006
- **Oleksandr Musiyenko** – **FC Vorkuta** – 2017–19, 2022–
- Oleksandr Muzychuk – FC Ukraine United – 2016
- Dimitri Pachkoria – FC Vorkuta – 2017
- Serhiy Patula – FC Vorkuta – 2017
- Volodymyr Pidvirnyi – FC Vorkuta – 2017–19
- Serhiy Pitel – Kingsman SC, FC Continentals, Toronto Falcons – 2019, 2022, 2023– 2024
- Roman Pitsur – FC Ukraine United – 2017
- Volodymyr Plishka – Toronto Atomic FC – 2015–16
- Bohdan Polyakhov – Toronto Atomic FC – 2016
- Dmytro Polyuhanych – FC Vorkuta, Kingsman SC, FC Vorkuta – 2018, 2019, 2020– 2021
- Dmytro Pronevych – FC Continentals – 2022
- Vasyl Pynyashko – Dynamo Toronto – 2023
- **Viktor Raskov** – FC Vorkuta, Kingsman SC, **FC Vorkuta** – 2017–18, 2019, 2020–
- Bohdan Riabets – FC Vorkuta – 2018–19
- Mykhaylo Ryabyi – FC Vorkuta – 2017–18
- Volodymyr Romaniv – FC Ukraine United – 2016–19
- Denys Rylskyi – Toronto Atomic FC – 2015–16
- Roman Sakhno – Toronto Atomic FC – 2016
- Andriy Savchenko – FC Ukraine United – 2017–19
- Sergey Semenov – FC Ukraine United – 2016–17
- Oleksandr Semenyuk – Toronto Atomic FC – 2015
- Sergiy Semyon – FC Vorkuta – 2017
- Sergiy Sergeyev – FC Ukraine United – 2016–18
- **Vasyl Shpuk** – Toronto Atomic FC, **Toronto Falcons** – 2015–16, 2022–
- Oleg Shutov – FC Ukraine United, FC Vorkuta – 2016, 2017
- Bohdan Sluka – FC Vorkuta, Kingsman SC – 2018, 2019
- Oleksandr Sobkovych – FC Ukraine United – 2017
- **Yaroslav Solonynko** – FC Vorkuta, **Toronto Falcons** – 2017–21, 2022–
- Yuri Sokolovsky – FC Ukraine United – 2017–19
- Ivan Sozanskyi – Toronto Atomic FC – 2016
- **Anatoly Starushchenko** – **FC Vorkuta** – 2019–
- Yuri Stepaniuk – FC Vorkuta – 2017
- Yaroslav Svorak – FC Vorkuta – 2017
- Oleksandr Tarasenko – FC Ukraine United, FC Vorkuta – 2017, 2018–19
- **Mykola Temniuk** – **FC Vorkuta** – 2019–
- **Mykyta Tkachov** – **FC Vorkuta** – 2020–
- Oleksandr Tomakh – Toronto Atomic FC – 2015
- **Serhiy Ursulenko** – **FC Vorkuta** – 2018 –19, 2021–
- **Oleksandr Viksych** – **Toronto Falcons** – 2023–
- Ihor Vitiv – Toronto Atomic FC – 2015–16
- Oleksandr Volchkov – FC Vorkuta – 2017–21
- Denys Yanchuk – FC Vorkuta II – 2017
- Ruslan Zarubin – FC Vorkuta – 2017
- Ihor Zhuk – Kingsman SC – 2019
- Vasyl Zhuk – Toronto Atomic FC, CSC Mississauga – 2016, 2019

== North and Central America, Caribbean (CONCACAF) ==
=== Antigua and Barbuda ===
- Peter Byers – Trois-Rivières Attak – 2009

=== Bahamas ===
- Happy Hall – North York Astros – 2008
- Lesly St. Fleur – Milltown FC – 2010

=== Barbados ===
- Zachary Ellis-Hayden – SC Waterloo Region – 2015
- Ryan Lucas – Mississauga Olympians – 2002

=== Bermuda ===
- Logan Alexander – Brantford Galaxy – 2012
- Domico Coddington – Durham Storm, Oakville Blue Devils – 2003–04, 2005
- Taurean Manders – Capital City FC, York Region Shooters – 2011, 2012

=== Cuba ===
- Andy Baquero – Scarborough SC – 2025
- Reysander Fernández – Brampton City United – 2013–15
- Yordan Santa Cruz – Scarborough SC – 2020

=== Dominica ===
- Chad Bertrand – London City SC – 2009
- Euclid Bertrand – London City SC – 2009
- Rasheed Bertrand – London City SC – 2009
- Anthony Dominique – London City SC – 1998
- Kenrick Emanuel – London City SC – 1998–99
- Paul Victor – London City SC – 2000

=== Dominican Republic ===
- Wilson Martínez – York Region Shooters – 2013–14

=== Grenada ===
- Rickey Sayers – York Region Shooters B – 2013
- Davier Walcott – North York Astros – 2012

=== Guyana ===
- **Shaquille Agard** – **Serbian White Eagles** – 2022
- Taylor Benjamin – Capital City F.C., Kingston FC, London City SC – 2011, 2013, 2014
- Adrian Butters – York Region Shooters – 2016
- Julien Edwards – Capital City F.C., Kingston FC – 2011, 2012
- Ryan Khedoo – Scarborough SC II – 2018
- Konata Mannings – Italia Shooters, North York Astros – 2007, 2008
- Quillan Roberts – TFC Academy, Portugal FC – (2009, 2011–12), 2010
- Jamaal Smith – Italia Shooters, SC Toronto – 2008, 2011
- Jelani Smith – Canadian Lions, Italia Shooters – 2007, 2008

=== Haiti ===
- Vladimir Edouard – Ottawa Wizards, Laval Dynamites – 2001, (2002–03, 2006)
- Jems Geffrard – Montreal Impact Academy – 2011–12

=== Jamaica ===
- Ashton Bennett – York Region Shooters – 2015–2017
- Michael Binns – York Region Shooters – 2015
- Shaqueil Bradford – Scarborough SC – 2023
- Shawn Brown – Serbian White Eagles, Mississauga Eagles, SC Waterloo Region, Toronto Croatia, York Region Shooters – 2010, 2011, 2012–2014, 2014–2015, 2016
- Kavin Bryan – York Region Shooters, Scarborough SC – 2017, 2018–2022
- Fabian Dawkins – Trois-Rivières Attak – 2007
- Richard Edwards – York Region Shooters – 2013–2017
- Winston Griffiths – Portuguese Supra, London City SC – 2007, 2010
- Ricky Herron – York Region Shooters – 2011–2016
- Gregory Messam – Metro Lions – 2004
- **Marvin Morgan Jr.** – **Scarborough SC** – 2019–
- Akeem Priestley – CSC Mississauga – 2018
- **Camaal Reid** – York Region Shooters, **Scarborough SC** – 2016–2017, 2021–
- Richard West – Brampton United, Serbian White Eagles, York Region Shooters – 2011, 2012, 2013–2017

=== Mexico ===
- Ruben Flores – Brampton Hitmen – 2003
- Arturo Cisneros Salas – Laval Dynamites – 2002, 2006
- **Jesus Eduardo Compean Gonzalez** – Scarborough SC, **FC Vorkuta** – 2019–20, 2021–
- Daniel González Vega – Scarborough SC – 2018
- Ricardo Munguía Pérez – Serbian White Eagles, Scarborough SC – (2007–08, 2011), 2015
- Ángel Velázquez – Brampton Hitmen, Oakville Blue Devils – 2003, 2005

=== Saint Kitts and Nevis ===
- Darryl Gomez – Oshawa Flames, Metro Lions, Toronto Supra, York Region Shooters, Serbian White Eagles – 1999, (2002–04, 2007), 2002, (2005, 2009–10, 2012–13), 2011
- Alain Sargeant – TFC Academy – 2011–12

=== Saint Lucia ===
- Sherwin Emmanuel – Portugal FC, Mississauga Eagles FC – 2010, 2011-12
- Jarvin Skeete – Portugal FC – 2009

=== Saint Vincent and the Grenadines ===
- Tre Crosby – SC Toronto – 2012
- Brandon John – SC Toronto – 2012
- Caswain Mason – Toronto Olympians, Metro Lions, Toronto Croatia, Serbian White Eagles – 2000, (2002–04, 2007), 2005–06, 2008

=== Trinidad and Tobago ===
- Shurland David – Ottawa Wizards – 2001–02
- Akil DeFreitas – Capital City FC, Kingston FC – 2011, 2014
- Hayden Fitzwilliams – Mississauga Olympians, Metro Lions, Toronto Croatia, York Region Shooters – 2002, 2003–04, 2005–15, 2016
- Richard Goddard – Ottawa Wizards – 2001
- Roger Groome – Ottawa Wizards – 2002
- Robin Hart – Ottawa Wizards – 2001–03
- Judah Hernandez – Oakville Blue Devils, Brampton Lions, Burlington SC – 2005, 2011, 2013
- Kevin Nelson – Ottawa Wizards, Hamilton Thunder – 2001–03, 2004
- Marvin Raeburn – Metro Lions – 2003
- Ryan Telfer – Mississauga Eagles FC – 2012
- Densill Theobald – Toronto Olympians – 2000
- Rick Titus – Toronto Olympians, York Region Shooters – 2000, 2008–10
- Jonathan Westmaas – York Region Shooters, Canadian Lions – (2002–03, 2010), 2007

=== United States ===
- Gary Boughton – Niagara United – 2013
- Tony Donatelli – Trois-Rivières Attak – 2008
- Jeremy Harkins – Windsor Border Stars – 2004–05
- Clint Irwin – Capital City FC – 2011
- Joe Malachino – Windsor Border Stars – 2005
- Andrew McKay – St. Catharines Wolves – 2000–01
- Paul Moran – Trois-Rivières Attak – 2007
- Tino Scicluna – Windsor Border Stars – 2004–05
- Jaman Tripoli – Windsor Border Stars – 2005
- Andrew Weber – Trois-Rivières Attak – 2007

== South America (CONMEBOL) ==
=== Argentina ===
- Juan Cruz Real – Brampton Hitmen, Hamilton Thunder, North York Astros – 2004, 2005, 2009
- Tati Errecalde – Windsor Border Stars – 2004–05
- Christian Lombardo – Toronto Supra – 2001–04
- Raúl Maradona – Toronto Olympians – 1998
- Gabriel Salguero – North York Astros – 2002–05
- Waldo Sponton – Toronto Supra – 2002

=== Bolivia ===
- Roland Vargas-Aguilera – Trois-Rivières Attak – 2008

=== Brazil ===
- André Andrade – Brampton Stallions – 2006
- Edmilson de Carvalho Barbosa – Hamilton Thunder – 2004
- Francisco Dos Santos – Brampton Hitmen, Toronto Supra, North York Astros – 2001, 2002, 2005, 2007 2003–04, 2006
- Osni Neto – Serbian White Eagles – 2007
- Helio Pereira – Brampton Stallions, Portuguese Supra – 2006, 2007–08
- Fabio Senhorinho Silva – Toronto Supra – 2003, 2004–06
- Paulo Silva – Brampton Hitmen, North York Astros – 2001, 2003
- Sullivan Silva – Capital City FC – 2011

=== Chile ===
- Cristián Gómez – Brantford Galaxy – 2011
- Jaime Grondona – Scarborough SC – 2023

=== Colombia ===
- Janer Guaza Lucumí – SC Toronto – 2012
- Alexander Posada – Toronto Supra Portuguese – 2006

=== Uruguay ===
- Federico Burguez – York Region Shooters B – 2015
- Rafael Carbajal – North York Astros – 1998

== Oceania (OFC) ==
=== New Zealand ===
- Daryl Holmes – Toronto Olympians – 1998–02
- Fergus Neil – Kingston FC – 2014

=== Tahiti ===
- Gong Lei – Toronto Olympians – 1998

== See also ==
- List of foreign MLS players
- List of foreign CPL players
