= Stanislav Katana =

Ukrainian footballer

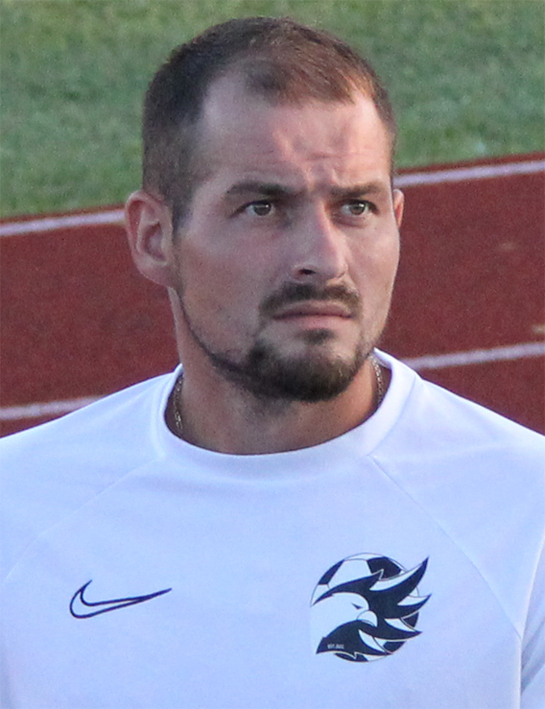
- Katana in 2022

Personal information
- Full name: Stanislav Volodymyrovych Katana
- Date of birth: 11 July 1992 (age 34)
- Place of birth: Dnipropetrovsk, Ukraine
- Height: 1.77 m (5 ft 10 in)
- Position: Midfielder

Youth career
- Dnipro Dnipropetrovsk

Senior career*
Years	Team	Apps	(Gls)
2009–2010	Tavriya Simferopol	0	(0)
2010–2012	Dnipro-2 Dnipropetrovsk	38	(1)
2013	VPK-Pobeda Shevchenkivka	6	(1)
2013–2015	Skala Stryi	40	(1)
2015–2016	Toronto Atomic	16	(5)
2017	Ukraine AC (indoor)	14	(5)
2019	Kingsman SC		
2021	Ukraine United		
2022	Toronto Falcons		
- * Club domestic league appearances and goals

Stanislav Katana (Ukrainian: Станіслав Катана; born July 11, 1992) is a Ukrainian former footballer who played as a midfielder.

== Club career ==
=== Ukraine ===
Katana began his career with SC Tavriya Simferopol in the Ukrainian Premier League, but never featured in any matches. In 2010, he played with Dnipro-2 Dnipropetrovsk in the Ukrainian Second League. Following his stint in the professional circuit, he played in the Dnipropetrovsk regional league with VPK-Pobeda Shevchenkivka. In the latter part of 2013, he returned to the third tier-league to sign a contract with Skala Stryi. In his debut season with Skala, he appeared in 26 matches and recorded 1 goal. He also debuted in the Ukrainian Cup against Poltava. Katana re-signed with the club for the following season. In his second season with Skala, he made 14 appearances.

=== Canada ===
In 2015, he played abroad in the Canadian Soccer League with Toronto Atomic FC. He made his debut against Niagara United on May 10, 2015. He helped Toronto secure a playoff berth by finishing fifth in the First Division. Toronto was eliminated in the opening round of the postseason by SC Waterloo Region. In his debut season with the club, he recorded five goals. He would re-sign with Toronto for the 2016 season. Toronto again secured a playoff spot, but they were eliminated from the competition by the Serbian White Eagles. In 2017, he played for Atomic's indoor team, Ukraine AC, in the Arena Premier League.

In 2019, Stanislav Katana joined the expansion team Kingsman SC. Kingsman won its first-round playoff game against FC Vorkuta but lost in the second round to Scarborough SC.

In 2021, he played at the amateur level in the Ontario Soccer League with FC Ukraine United. After a season in the OSL, he returned to the CSL in 2022 to sign with the expansion franchise Toronto Falcons.
