= 2019 Football Championship of Dnipropetrovsk Oblast =

Football Championship of Dnipropetrovsk Oblast
- Season: 2019
- Champions: Skoruk Tomakivka

The 2019 Football Championship of Dnipropetrovsk Oblast was won by Skoruk Tomakivka.

== League table ==
Pos	Team	Pld	W	D	L	GF	GA	GD	Pts	Qualification or relegation
1	**Skoruk Tomakivka** (C)	22	20	0	2	67	10	+57	60	
2	Atrium Pavlohrad	22	19	2	1	66	17	+49	59	
3	**Druzhba Kryvyi Rih**	22	14	1	7	63	23	+40	43	
4	Avanhard Pokrov	22	13	3	6	37	23	+14	42	
5	DniproAhro Synelnykove	22	12	3	7	47	31	+16	39	
6	FC Pavlohrad	22	10	3	9	41	42	−1	33	
7	Enerhiya Dnipro	22	8	4	10	39	34	+5	28	
8	FC Lozovatka	22	8	1	13	35	48	−13	25	
9	**Lehioner Dnipro**	22	6	4	12	35	42	−7	22	
10	Penuel Kryvyi Rih	22	4	2	16	19	67	−48	14	
11	Skif Dnipro	22	3	3	16	22	75	−53	12	
12	FC Petrykivka	22	1	2	19	24	83	−59	5	
–	**VPK-Ahro Shevchenkivka** (X)	4	4	0	0	12	3	+9	12	Withdrew

Source: "Чемпіонат Дніпропетровської області 2019". Footboom. Archived from the original on 2020-06-18.
(C) Champions; (X) Withdrew
- FC VPK-Ahro Shevchenkivka joined the 2019–20 Ukrainian Second League.
- In **bold** are clubs that parallelly participated in the 2018–19 Ukrainian Football Amateur League.
- Lehioner Dnipro also participated in the 2019–20 Ukrainian Football Amateur League.
