= Oleksandr Tomakh =

Oleksandr Tomakh may refer to:

- Oleksandr Tomakh (footballer, born 1948), Ukrainian footballer and manager
- Oleksandr Tomakh (footballer, born 1969), Ukrainian footballer and manager
- Oleksandr Tomakh (footballer, born 1993), Ukrainian footballer
