= Sakhno =

Sakhno (Ukrainian: Сахно) is a Ukrainian surname. Notable people with this surname include:

- Ivanna Sakhno (born 1997), Ukrainian actress
- Roman Sakhno (born 1990), Ukrainian footballer
- Viktor Sakhno (born 1961), Ukrainian footballer
