= Serhiy Patula =

Ukrainian footballer (born 1986)

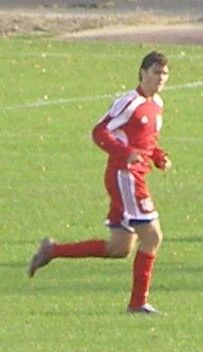
- Patula in 2010

Personal information
- Full name: Serhiy Stepanovych Patula
- Date of birth: 5 May 1986 (age 40)
- Place of birth: Dniprodzerzhynsk, Ukrainian SSR, Soviet Union
- Position: Midfielder

Senior career*
Years	Team	Apps	(Gls)
2004	Stal Dniprodzerzhynsk-2	12	(1)
2004–2007	Ros Bila Tserkva	78	(4)
2008–2009	Feniks-Illichovets Kalinine	20	(0)
2009	Sevastopol	5	(0)
2010	Khimik Krasnoperekopsk		
2010–2013	Stal Dniprodzerzhynsk	37	(3)
2013	VPK-Ahro Shevchenkivka		
2013–2014	FC Olimpik Petrykivka	31	(3)
2015	Stal Dniprodzerzhynsk-2	6	(0)
2017–2018	FC Vorkuta		
- * Club domestic league appearances and goals

Serhiy Patula (Ukrainian: Сергій Степанович Патула; born May 5, 1986) is a Ukrainian former footballer who played as a midfielder.

Patula began his career at the youth level in the Dnipropetrovsk region. In 2004, he was elevated to the professional level by signing with Ros Bila Tserkva in Central Ukraine. Patula would leave Bila Tserkva in 2008 to play in the Crimean peninsula with Feniks-Illichovets Kalinine. After a three-year run with different clubs in the Crimean region, he returned to the Dnipropetrovsk region with Stal Dniprodzerzhynsk. His career spent in the Dnipropetrovsk area would last for six seasons. In 2017, he finished his career by playing two seasons abroad in Canada.

== Club career ==
=== Ukraine ===
Patula began his career at the youth level with Prometei Dniprodzerzhynsk, and later joined Shakhtar Donetsk's academy in 2000. After three years with Shakhtar's youth team, he played with Stal Dniprodzerzhynsk's reserve team in the Dnipropetrovsk regional league.

In 2004, he joined the professional ranks by signing with Ros Bila Tserkva in the Ukrainian Second League. After three and a half seasons in the country's third-tier league, he began playing in the Ukrainian First League with Feniks-Illichovets Kalinine. In his second season with the Crimean-based club, he made his debut in the Ukrainian Cup tournament against Sevastopol. In the early winter of 2009, he was transferred to Sevastopol. His tenure with Sevastopol was short-lived, as he joined Khimik Krasnoperekopsk in 2010. He helped Khimik win the regional Crimean title.

In the summer of 2010, he returned to his former club, Stal Dniprodzerzhynsk, to compete in the country's third division league. In his final season with Dniprodzerzhynsk, he started against premier league side Illichivets Mariupol in the 2013–14 Ukrainian Cup.

Following his departure from the professional circuit, he joined with VPK-Ahro Shevchenkivka in the Dnipropetrovsk regional league. For the remainder of the 2013 season, he played with FC Olimpik Petrykivka until the 2015 season. In 2015, he played with Stal Dniprodzerzhynsk's reserve team.

=== Canada ===
In the summer of 2017, he ventured abroad by signing with expansion side FC Vorkuta in the Canadian Soccer League. In his debut season in the Canadian circuit, he helped Vorkuta win the league's first division title. In the playoff tournament, Vorkuta was eliminated in the semifinal round by Scarborough SC.

Patula re-signed with Vorkuta for the 2018 season. Vorkuta would win the championship title by defeating Scarborough.

== Honors ==
Khimik Krasnoperekopsk

- Republican Football Federation of Crimea: 2010

FC Vorkuta

- CSL Championship: 2018
- Canadian Soccer League First Division: 2017
