= 2020–21 Football Championship of Dnipropetrovsk Oblast =

Football Championship of Dnipropetrovsk Oblast
- Season: 2020–21
- Champions: Skoruk Tomakivka

The 2020–21 Football Championship of Dnipropetrovsk Oblast was won by Skoruk Tomakivka.

== League table ==
Pos	Team	Pld	W	D	L	GF	GA	GD	Pts
1	Skoruk Tomakivka (C)	16	15	1	0	49	6	+43	46
2	Druzhba Kryvyi Rih	16	11	2	3	36	14	+22	35
3	Avanhard Pokrov	16	8	5	3	33	24	+9	29
4	FC Pavlohrad	16	6	5	5	24	29	−5	23
5	FC Lozovatka	16	6	3	7	29	24	+5	21
6	Olimp Kamianske	16	6	2	8	23	24	−1	20
7	Lehioner Dnipro	16	4	3	9	24	35	−11	15
8	Topol Dnipro	16	3	3	10	28	37	−9	12
9	Penuel Kryvyi Rih	16	1	0	15	7	60	−53	3

Source: "Чемпіонат Дніпропетровської області 2020/2021". Footboom.
(C) Champions
