= Roman Sakhno =

Ukrainian footballer

Personal information
- Full name: Roman Aleksandrovich Sakhno
- Date of birth: 21 May 1990 (age 36)
- Place of birth: Dnipropetrovsk, Ukrainian SSR, Soviet Union
- Position: Midfielder

Senior career*
| Years | Team | Apps | (Gls) |
| 2007–2008 | Dnipro-75 Dnipropetrovsk | 7 | (1) |
| 2008–2011 | Kryvbas Kryvyi Rih | 0 | (0) |
| 2008–2009 | → Dnipro-75 Dnipropetrovsk (loan) | 15 | (0) |
| 2011–2012 | Naftovyk-Ukrnafta Okhtyrka | 13 | (0) |
| 2012–2013 | Hirnyk-Sport Komsomolsk | 1 | (0) |
| 2014 | VPK-Ahro Shevchenkivka | 12 | (0) |
| 2014–2015 | Makiyivvuhillya Makiivka | 21 | (1) |
| 2015–2016 | Kolos Zachepylivka | 16 | (4) |
| 2016 | Toronto Atomic FC | 11 | (1) |
| 2017–2019 | Ukraine AC (indoor) | 14 | (2) |
| 2020-2021 | FC Vorkuta | | |
- * Club domestic league appearances and goals

Roman Sakhno (Ukrainian: Роман Олександрович Сахно; born 21 May 1990) is a Ukrainian former footballer. His career spanned over 15 years, during which he played across the lower and top tiers of Ukrainian football before finishing his career in Canada.

.

== Club career ==
=== Ukraine ===
Sakhno began his career in 2007 with Dnipro-75 Dnipropetrovsk in the Ukrainian Second League. Throughout his time with Dnipro, he debuted in the Ukrainian Cup against Olkom Melitopol. In 2008, he signed with Kryvbas Kryvyi Rih in the country's top league, the Ukrainian Premier League. After failing to make an appearance with Kryvbas, he transferred to the Ukrainian First League to play with Naftovyk-Ukrnafta Okhtyrka.

In 2012, he returned to play in the Second League with Hirnyk-Sport Komsomolsk.

After his time in the professional circuits, he played at the Dnipropetrovsk regional level with VPK-Ahro Shevchenkivka, where he served as team captain. He participated in the Dnipropetrovsk Region Governor's Cup, where FC Agrofirm Pyatikhatskaya defeated them. He also helped VPK-Ahro Shevchenkivka secure the regional league title. The club also competed in the 2014 Ukrainian Football Amateur League season, where he appeared in 4 matches.

After his stint with VPK-Ahro Shevchenkivka, he returned to the professional level by signing with Makiyivvuhi. The following season, he competed in the Kharkiv regional league with Kolos Zachepylivka. In his debut season with Kolos, he helped the club win the Kharkiv Region Football Cup. He also competed in the 2015 Ukrainian Football Amateur League with Kolos. Sakhno re-signed with Kolos for the 2016 season.

=== Canada ===
In the summer of 2016, he played abroad in the Canadian Soccer League with Toronto Atomic FC. He scored his first goal for Toronto on September 11, 2016, against FC Ukraine United. He helped Toronto qualify for the playoffs, where the Serbian White Eagles eliminated them in the opening round. In his debut season in the Canadian circuit, he appeared in 11 matches and scored 1 goal. In the winter of 2017, he played with Toronto's indoor team in the Arena Premier League.

In 2020, he returned to the Canadian circuit with FC Vorkuta. In his debut season, he played in the championship final against Scarborough SC and won. Sakhno re-signed with Vorkuta for the 2021 season. In his final season with Vorkuta, he helped to secure the regular-season title.

== Honors ==
FC VPK-Ahro Shevchenkivka

- Dnipropetrovsk Oblast Championship: 2014

Kolos Zachepylivka

- Kharkiv Oblast Region Football Cup: 2015

FC Vorkuta

- CSL Championship: 2020
- Canadian Soccer League Regular Season: 2021
