= Tatiana Stepanova (ballerina) =

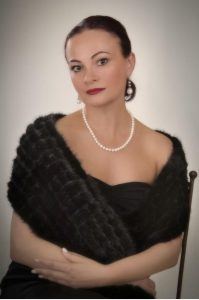
- Born: Odesa, Ukraine
- Occupations: Artistic Director, Choreographer, Prima Ballerina,

Tatiana Stepanova, also Tetyana Stepanova, (Russian: Татьяна Степанова; Ukrainian: Тeтяна Степанова, Tatiana Stepanova) (born, Odesa, Ukraine then Soviet Union) is a ballerina and choreographer. She is now the artistic director of Stepanova Ballet Academy and Toronto International Ballet Theatre. As Prima Ballerina of the Odesa State Ballet Company, she was awarded the honorary title of People's Artist of Ukraine for her excellence in the art of ballet.

Stepanova is married to Ukrainian footballer Vasyl Ishchak.

== Biography ==
Tatiana Stepanova auditioned for and was accepted by the Bolshoi Ballet Academy in Moscow at the age of eleven and went on to study there full-time for six years. Upon completion of her training, she returned to her native home in Odesa, where she was invited to perform as Principal Dancer for the Odesa State Ballet Company. It was here that Stepanova was given the opportunity to dance the Principal Roles in an extensive classical, contemporary, and modern repertoire. She was honored with the status of Prima Ballerina, and awarded as a People's Artist of Ukraine.

Stepanova has worked with Natalia Krassovska, George Zoritch, and Irina Baronova. Stepanova's international travels involved performing in many countries throughout the world including, Japan, Italy, Malta, Finland, Hungary, Bulgaria, Taiwan, Romania, and many cities across North America.

Stepanova was inspired by such great artists as Galina Ulanova, Marina Semyonova, and Maya Plisetskaya.

== Stepanova Ballet Academy ==
In 2004 Stepanova founded Stepanova Ballet Academy, located in Thornhill, Ontario, Canada. Under the artistic direction of Stepanova, Stepanova Ballet Academy has quickly become among the premier ballet/dance schools in Ontario.

== Toronto International Ballet Theatre ==
In 2007, Stepanova founded Toronto International Ballet Theatre.

Under the Artistic Direction of Stepanova, Toronto International Ballet Theatre has successfully put on six professionally staged productions of The Nutcracker.

== Choreographic work ==
- Cinderella
- Alice's Adventures in Wonderland
- Coppelia
- Graduation Ball
- Chippolino
- Hansel and Gretel
- Pinocchio
- My Way
- Thumbelina
- Snow White
- The Nutcracker
- Fairy Doll
