= Volodymyr Plishka =

Ukrainian footballer

Personal information
- Full name: Volodymyr Volodymyrovych Plishka
- Date of birth: 2 August 1991 (age 35)
- Place of birth: Ternopil, Ukrainian SSR
- Position: Defender

Senior career*
Years	Team	Apps	(Gls)
2008–2009	Nyva Ternopil	1	(0)
2010	FC Agro-Zbruch Pidvolochysk		
2011–2013	Nyva Ternopil	27	(0)
2013–2014	Dynamo Khmelnytskyi	17	(5)
2014–2015	Enerhiya Nova Kakhovka	11	(2)
2015–2016	Toronto Atomic FC		
2019–2020	FC Vorkuta II	5	(1)
2021	FC Ukraine United		
- * Club domestic league appearances and goals

Volodymyr Volodymyrovych Plishka (Ukrainian: Володимир Володимирович Плішка; born 2 August 1991) is a Ukrainian former footballer who played as a defender.

Plishka was a product of the Ternopil Youth and Sports School and began his professional career in 2008 with his native club Nyva Ternopil. Following a brief tenure at the amateur level, he returned to the professional level with Ternopil and helped the club secure promotion to the Ukrainian First League. He remained in the Ukrainian third-tier league by playing with Dynamo Khmelnytskyi and Enerhiya Nova Kakhovka. In 2015, he ventured abroad to finish his career in Canada.

== Club career ==
=== Ukraine ===
Plishka began his career at the youth level with the Ternopil Youth and Sports School. He joined the professional ranks in 2008 by joining with Nyva Ternopil in the Ukrainian Second League. In his debut season with Nyva, the club secured promotion to the Ukrainian First League by winning the league title. After his brief stint at the professional level, he played with Agro-Zbruch Pidvolochysk in the Ternopil regional league.

Following a stint at the regional level, he returned to the professional circuit with his former team, Nyva Ternopil, in 2011. Nyva re-signed Plishka for the following season. He also made his debut in the Ukrainian Cup against Real Pharma Yuzhne. In his third season with Nyva, the club secured a promotion to the second division by finishing as runners-up. After helping Ternopil secure a promotion, he left the club in the summer of 2013.

Plishka remained in the country's third-tier league for the 2013-14 season by signing with Dynamo Khmelnytskyi. After a season with Dynamo, he played with Enerhiya Nova Kakhovka.

=== Canada ===
In the summer of 2015, he signed with the expansion side Toronto Atomic in the Canadian Soccer League. Plishka debuted for Toronto on May 10, 2015, against Niagara United. He helped Toronto secure a playoff berth by finishing fifth in the league's first division. The club was eliminated from the postseason in the opening round by SC Waterloo Region. Toronto re-signed him for the 2016 season. Plishka helped Toronto secure another playoff spot, but they were eliminated from the competition by the Serbian White Eagles.

Plishka returned to the Canadian circuit in 2019 to play with FC Vorkuta's reserve team in the league's second division. He helped the club secure the divisional title. In the playoffs, Vorkuta defeated the Serbian White Eagles' reserve team for the championship.

In 2021, he played in the Ontario Soccer League with FC Ukraine United.

== Honors ==
FC Nyva Ternopil

- Ukrainian Second League Group A: 2008–09
- Ukrainian Second League runner-up: 2012–13

FC Vorkuta II

- CSL Championship II: 2019
- Canadian Soccer League Second Division: 2019
