= Vasyl Ishchak =

Ukrainian footballer and manager

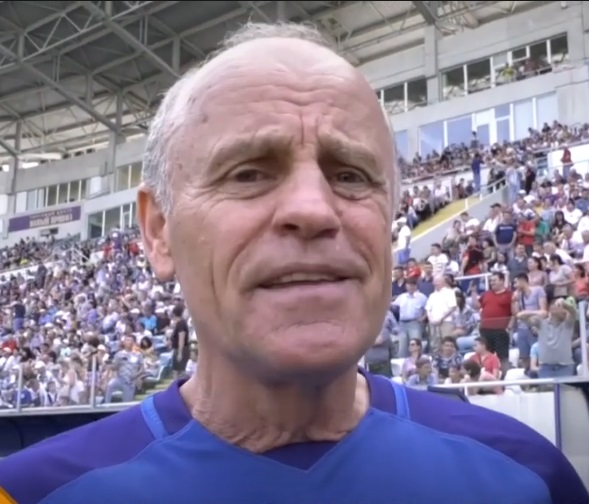
- Ishchak in 2019

Personal information
- Full name: Vasyl Yevhenovych Ishchak
- Date of birth: 5 April 1955 (age 71)
- Place of birth: Dubie, Ukrainian SSR
- Height: 1.78 m (5 ft 10 in)
- Positions: Defender; forward

Senior career*
Years	Team	Apps	(Gls)
1974	SC Lutsk	?	(1)
1975	SKA Lviv (reserves)		
1976–1977	FC Mashuk Pyatigorsk	56	(9)
1977–1990	FC Chornomorets Odesa	357	(13)
1990–1993	BVSC Budapest	62	(1)
1993–1994	FC Blaho Blahoyeve (amateur)	14	(0)
1994	Toronto Italia	?	(?)

Managerial career
- 2008–2015: FC Chornomorets Odesa (youth teams)
- 2015: Toronto Atomic II
- 2015–2016: Toronto Atomic FC
- 2018: Unionville Milliken SC
- 2024: FC Ukraine United
- * Club domestic league appearances and goals

Vasyl Yevhenovych Ishchak (Ukrainian: Василь Євгенович Іщак; born 5 April 1955) is a retired Ukrainian professional footballer and manager.

== Club career ==
=== Early career ===
Ishchak's football career began in the Lviv region with Sokol Lviv in 1972. After two seasons in his native region, he joined SC Lutsk while serving in the army. In 1976, he continued his professional career with Mashuk-KMV Pyatigorsk in the Soviet Second League.

=== Odesa ===
He began playing in the country's top-tier league in 1977 with Chornomorets Odesa. Throughout his lengthy tenure with Odesa, he managed to play in two continental tournaments. His first international tournament was in the 1985–86 UEFA Cup. After the 1986 season, the club was relegated to the Soviet First League and managed to secure a promotion by winning the league title. His next European tournament occurred in the UEFA Cup 1990–91. Ishchak's final piece of silverware won with Odesa was the USSR Federation Cup, where they defeated Dnepr Dnepropetrovsk.

=== Hungary ===
After the collapse of the Soviet Union, he ventured abroad to play in the Hungarian top-tier league with BVSC Budapest FC. Following his two-year stint in Hungary, he returned to Ukraine to play with FC Blaho Blahoyeve. He made 14 appearances with Blaho in the national amateur league.

=== Canada ===
Ishchak emigrated to Canada in 1994 and played in the Southern Ontario-based Canadian National Soccer League with Toronto Italia. In his debut season, he helped Toronto win the regular-season title. The Italians would also win the league championship by defeating St. Catharines Roma in the postseason finals.

== Managerial career ==
After he retired from professional football, he coached the youth teams of his former club Chornomorets Odesa.

Ishchak returned to Canada in the summer of 2015 as the head coach for Toronto Atomic's reserve team in the second division of the Canadian Soccer League. Midway through the season, he was elevated to the senior team to replace Ihor Yavorskyi as the head coach. He led the team to a playoff berth by finishing fifth in the league's first division. Toronto was eliminated in the opening round of the playoffs by SC Waterloo Region. Once the season concluded, the league named him the division's coach of the year.

In 2016, his contract with Toronto Atomic was extended. Ishchak secured another postseason berth for Toronto by finishing fifth in the division. The Serbian White Eagles eliminated Toronto in the quarterfinals.

In 2018, he managed Unionville Milliken SC.

Ishchak joined the coaching staff of Ukraine United in the Ontario Soccer League in 2024.

== Personal life ==
Ishchak is married to Odesa-born ballerina Tatiana Stepanova.

== Honours ==
=== Player ===
Chornomorets Odesa

- Soviet First League: 1987
- USSR Federation Cup: 1990

Toronto Italia

- Canadian National Soccer League Championship: 1994
- Canadian National Soccer League Regular Season: 1994

=== Manager ===
Individual

- Canadian Soccer League Coach of the Year: 2015
