= Nemo Shelia =

Georgian footballer

Personal information
- Date of birth: 6 August 1991 (age 35)
- Place of birth: Georgia
- Position: Forward

Senior career*
Years	Team	Apps	(Gls)
2009–2010	Gagra	3	(0)
2010	FC Marspirt		
2011–2012	FC Zbarazh		
2013	Dnister Zalishchyky		
2014–2016	Skuri Tsalenjikha	65	(13)
2017	Nyva Ternopil	5	(0)
2017	Ternopil	3	(0)
2017–2018	Nyva Terebovlya	12	(4)
2018–2019	DSO-Podillia		
2019	Agronyva-TNPU		
2023–	Toronto Falcons	12	(6)

Managerial career
- 2019: Agronyva-TNPU
- * Club domestic league appearances and goals

Nemo Shelia (born August 6, 1991) is a Georgian footballer who plays as a forward for the Toronto Falcons.

== Club career ==
=== Early career ===
Shelia began his professional career in the Georgian top-tier league with Gagra during the 2009–10 season. He departed from the club after a series of injuries and limited playing opportunities. He initially ventured abroad to Ukraine with hopes of securing a contract with Dynamo Kyiv's reserve team. After failing to secure a contract with Dynamo, he would remain in Ukraine and play in the national amateur league with FC Marspirt.

In 2011, he continued playing at the amateur level with FC Zbarazh and the following season with Dnister Zalishchyky.

=== Georgia ===
After several stints abroad, he returned to his native Georgia in 2014 by signing with Skuri Tsalenjikha in the country's second division. In his debut season with the club, he appeared in 20 matches and recorded 2 goals. Throughout his tenure with Skuri, he served as the team captain. He also debuted in the Georgian Cup against Imereti Khoni. He departed the club in 2016 when the organization began to experience financial difficulties.

=== Ukraine ===
In 2017, he returned to the Ukrainian national amateur circuit by securing a deal with Nyva Ternopil. He left the club after making 5 appearances in the early summer of 2017. Following his departure from Nyva, he returned to the professional ranks by signing a contract with FC Ternopil in the Ukrainian third division. His time with Ternopil was brief as he only appeared in 3 matches. For the remainder of the 2017 season, he played with Nyva Terebovlya, where he appeared in 12 matches and recorded 4 goals.

In 2018, he played with DSO-Podillia, where he won the Ternopil regional cup. Shelia would sign with Agronyva-TNPU for the 2019 season. Shortly after his signing, he was named the club's acting head coach. In his debut season as manager, he led Agronyva to a third-place finish in the standings.

=== Canada ===
In the summer of 2023, he went abroad once more, this time to play in the Canadian Soccer League with the Toronto Falcons. He would record a hat trick on August 26, 2023, against Ooty Black Pearl. Shelia would assist the club in finishing third in the standings.

== Honors ==
DSO-Podillia

- Ternopil Oblast Cup: 2018
