= Oleksandr Viksych =

Ukrainian footballer

Personal information
- Full name: Oleksandr Yaroslavovych Viksych
- Date of birth: 10 September 1995 (age 31)
- Place of birth: Klivodin, Ukraine
- Position: Defender

Youth career
- 2011–2012: FC Dnipro

Senior career*
Years	Team	Apps	(Gls)
2012–2015	Chornomorets Odesa	0	(0)
2014–2015	Shakhtar-3 Donetsk	9	(0)
2015–2017	Real Pharma Odesa	45	(0)
2017–2018	Naftovyk Okhtyrka	9	(0)
2018–2019	Bukovyna Chernivtsi	11	(0)
2018–2019	Real Pharma Odesa	7	(0)
2019	Bukovyna Chernivtsi	0	(0)
2023–	Toronto Falcons		
- * Club domestic league appearances and goals

Oleksandr Viksych (born September 10, 1995) is a Ukrainian footballer who plays as a defender for Toronto Falcons.

== Club career ==
=== Youth career ===
Viksych played his youth football at the Ukrainian Youth Football League with teams such as RVUFK Kyiv, Monolit, and the FC Dnipro youth side. He would secure his first professional contract with Chornomorets Odesa in 2012.

=== Ukraine ===
After failing to break into the senior team with Odesa, he would instead make his professional debut with Shakhtar Donetsk's reserve team in the Ukrainian third division. He would make 9 appearances for Shakhtar during the 2014–15 season.

Following his brief season with Shakhtar, he ventured to Southern Ukraine to sign with Real Pharma Odesa. He would re-sign with Odesa for another season in 2016. After 3 1/2 seasons with Odesa, he signed a contract with Naftovyk Okhtyrka for the remainder of the 2017–18 season in the country's second-tier league. In total, he would play in 45 matches in his first run with Odesa.

He would play in 9 matches for Naftovyk. For the 2018–19 season, he returned to the third division to play with Bukovyna Chernivtsi. After a season with Chernivtsi, he departed from the team. In 2019, he returned to his former club Real Pharma Odesa for the first portion of the campaign. Viksych would compete in 7 matches in his final season with the Odesa-based club. After his stint in southern Ukraine, he returned to the western side to once more sign with Bukovyna. However, he failed to make an appearance with the club and was released shortly after the announcement of signing.

=== Canada ===
In 2023, he played abroad in the Canadian Soccer League with the Toronto Falcons. Viksych would assist the club in finishing third in the standings. He re-signed with the Falcons for the 2024 season.
