= Ihor Mihalevskyi =

Ukrainian footballer

Personal information
- Full name: Ihor Viktorovych Mihalevskyi
- Date of birth: 18 March 1985 (age 41)
- Place of birth: Novoiavorivsk, Lviv Oblast, Ukrainian SSR
- Height: 1.79 m (5 ft 10 in)
- Position: Striker

Senior career*
Years	Team	Apps	(Gls)
2001–2003	Karpaty-3 Lviv	32	(2)
2003–2006	Rava Rava-Ruska	52	(6)
2006	Karpaty Kamianka Buzka		
2007	Halychyna Lviv	6	(5)
2007–2008	Spartakus Szarowola		
2008–2009	Hetman Zamość	31	(6)
2009	→ GKS Bełchatów (loan)	7	(0)
2009–2010	Stal Stalowa Wola	17	(3)
2010	Spartakus Szarowola	8	(2)
2010–2011	Start Otwock	21	(4)
2011	Sambir	14	(7)
2011–2012	Motor Lublin	24	(15)
2012	Rukh Vynnyky	13	(14)
2013–2014	Motor Lublin	38	(5)
2015–2016	Toronto Atomic FC	35	(4)
- * Club domestic league appearances and goals

Ihor Mihalevskyi (Ukrainian: Ігор Вікторович Мігалевський; born 18 March 1985) is a Ukrainian former professional footballer who played as a striker.

== Playing career ==
Mihalevskyi began his career with Karpaty-3 Lviv in the Ukrainian Second League in 2001. He played in Ukrainian lower divisions with Rava Rava-Ruska, Karpaty Kamianka Buzska and Halychyna Lviv, before moving to Polish club Spartakus Szarowola in 2007. Shortly after, he joined Hetman Zamość. In 2008, he was loaned to top division outfit GKS Bełchatów. Later he would spend time with Stal Stalowa Wola, Start Otwock, Motor Lublin, with short stints in Ukraine with Rukh Vynnyky and Sambir. In 2015, he went overseas to Canada to sign with Toronto Atomic FC of the Canadian Soccer League. He recorded his first goal for the club on 9 May 2015 in a match against Niagara United.

== Honours ==
Individual

- II liga East top scorer: 2011–12
