= Kyrylo Antonenko =

Ukrainian footballer

Personal information
- Full name: Kyrylo Oleksandrovych Antonenko
- Date of birth: 14 February 1991 (age 35)
- Place of birth: Ukraine SSR, Soviet Union
- Position: Forward

Senior career*
| Years | Team | Apps | (Gls) |
| 2007–2009 | Metalurh Zaporizhzhia | 0 | (0) |
| 2008–2010 | Tytan Armiansk | 16 | (2) |
| 2010–2011 | Hirnyk-Sport Komsomolsk | 2 | (0) |
| 2011–2012 | Dynamo Khmelnytskyi | 1 | (0) |
| 2014–2015 | Enerhiya Nova Kakhovka | 10 | (0) |
| 2017 | Ukraine United | 11 | (4) |
| 2018 | Vorkuta II | | |
| 2019 | Avangard Pokrov | 9 | (3) |
| 2022–2024 | Toronto Falcons | | |
- * Club domestic league appearances and goals

Kyrylo Oleksandrovych Antonenko (Ukrainian: Кирило Олександрович Антоненко; born 14 February 1991) is a Ukrainian footballer who plays as a forward.

== Club career ==
=== Ukraine ===
Antonenko was a product of the Metalurh Zaporizhzhia academy program.

He would join the professional ranks in 2008 in the Ukrainian Second League with Tytan Armyansk. The following season, he assisted the team in securing promotion to the Ukrainian First League by winning the league. After two seasons with Tytan, he remained in the third tier by signing with Hirnyk-Sport Horishni Plavni.

In 2011, he secured a deal with Dynamo Khmelnytskyi. In total, he played in one match for Dynamo. After a brief absence, he returned to the third tier to play with Enerhiya Nova Kakhovka. In his debut season with Enerhiya, he appeared in 11 matches.

=== Canada ===
In 2017, he went abroad to play in the Canadian Soccer League with FC Ukraine United. He would record a hat-trick for the club on June 11, 2017, against Brantford Galaxy II. In his debut season with Ukraine United, he helped the club achieve a perfect season by initially clinching the Second Division title. He also assisted the club in securing the CSL II Championship by defeating Burlington SC.

The following season, he played with league rivals FC Vorkuta II. He secured another divisional title with the club and secured a playoff berth. In the opening round of the postseason, he recorded a goal against Brantford Galaxy II in a 3-1 victory. Vorkuta would win the second-division championship against Halton United.

=== Avangard Pokrov ===
After two seasons abroad in Canada, he returned to Ukraine to play with Avangard Pokrov in the Dnipropetrovsk regional league.

=== Toronto Falcons ===
In 2022, he returned to the CSL circuit to play with the expansion franchise Toronto Falcons. He re-signed with Toronto for the 2023 season and helped the Falcons finish third in the standings. Antonenko signed for his third term with the Falcons in 2024.

== Honors ==
Tytan Armiansk

- Ukrainian Second League Group B: 2009–10

FC Ukraine United

- CSL II Championship: 2017
- Canadian Soccer League Second Division: 2017

FC Vorkuta II

- CSL II Championship: 2018
