= Vasyl Shpuk =

Ukrainian football goalkeeper (born 1989)

Personal information
- Full name: Vasyl Stepanovych Shpuk
- Date of birth: 16 February 1989 (age 37)
- Place of birth: Mizhenets, Ukrainian SSR, Soviet Union
- Height: 1.97 m (6 ft 5 1/2 in)
- Position: Goalkeeper

Team information
- Current team: Toronto Falcons

Senior career*
Years	Team	Apps	(Gls)
2006	Chornohora Ivano-Frankivsk	1	(0)
2006–2007	Prykarpattya Ivano-Frankivsk	3	(0)
2007–2009	Naftovyk-Ukrnafta Okhtyrka	0	(0)
2010–2012	Skala Stryi	31	(0)
2011–2012	Lviv	2	(0)
2012–2013	Skala Stryi	26	(0)
2013–2014	Karpaty Lviv	0	(0)
2014	Polonia Przemyśl	12	(0)
2014–2015	Nyva Ternopil	12	(0)
2015–2016	Toronto Atomic		
2022–	Toronto Falcons		
- * Club domestic league appearances and goals

Vasyl Stepanovych Shpuk (born 16 February 1989) is a Ukrainian footballer who plays as a goalkeeper for Canadian Soccer League club Toronto Falcons.

== Club career ==
=== Europe ===
Shpuk began his professional career in 2006 with FC Chornohora Ivano-Frankivsk in the Ukrainian Second League. He signed with FC Prykarpattya Ivano-Frankivsk, and helped the club achieve a promotion to the Ukrainian First League. In 2007, he signed with FC Naftovyk-Ukrnafta Okhtyrka of the Ukrainian Premier League. After failing to break into the senior team, he signed with Skala Stryi in 2010.

In 2011, he played in the Ukrainian First League with FC Lviv. In his debut season in the second tier, he made 2 appearances with Lviv. The following season he returned to his former club Skala in the third tier. He would make 26 appearances for the club.

Shpuk returned to the country's top-tier league for the 2013-14 season with Karpaty Lviv. Once again he failed to make an appearance in the premier league due to miscommunications with the team administration. In late 2013, he had a trial session with FC Poltava.

In early 2014, he went across the border to Poland to sign with Polonia Przemyśl of Liga III. Following his brief stint abroad he returned to the Ukrainian second tier by securing a deal with Nyva Ternopil. In the winter of 2015, he departed from the Ternopil. In total, he played in 12 matches for Nyva.

=== Canada ===
After his release from Ternopil, he was linked with a move abroad to the Canadian Soccer League with Toronto Atomic. He would ultimately sign with Toronto for the 2015 season. He made his debut on May 9, 2015 against Niagara United. He helped Toronto secure a playoff berth by finishing fifth in the First Division. Toronto was eliminated in the opening round of the postseason by SC Waterloo Region.

Shpuk would re-sign with Toronto for the 2016 season. Atomic once more secured a playoff spot where the Serbian White Eagles eliminated them from the competition in the first round.

In 2022, he returned to the CSL to play with the expansion franchise Toronto Falcons. He re-signed with the Falcons for the 2023 season. Shpuk participated in the Royal CSL Cup tribute match where Toronto won the title in a penalty shootout against the Serbs.

== Honors ==
Toronto Falcons

- Canadian Soccer League Royal CSL Cup: 2023
