= Serhiy Pitel =

Ukrainian footballer (born 1995)

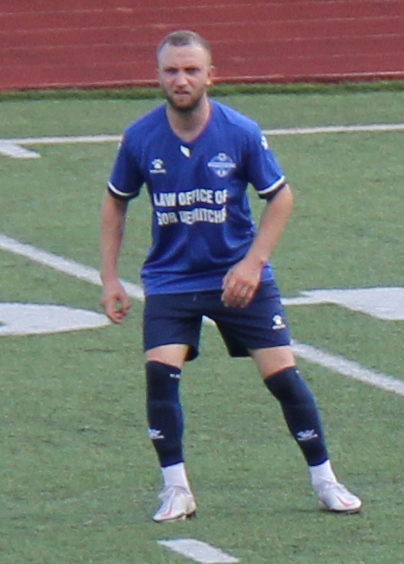
- Pitel in 2022

Personal information
- Full name: Serhiy Anatoliyovych Pitel
- Date of birth: 10 September 1995 (age 31)
- Place of birth: Illichivsk, Ukraine
- Height: 1.67 m (5 ft 6 in)
- Position: Midfielder

Team information
- Current team: Toronto Falcons

Youth career
- 2008–2009: FC Monolit Illichivsk
- 2009: FC Azovstal Mariupol
- 2010–2012: Skala Stryi

Senior career*
Years	Team	Apps	(Gls)
2012–2013	Skala Stryi	0	(0)
2014–2015	Enerhiya Nova Kakhovka	12	(0)
2015–2016	Hoverla Uzhhorod	0	(0)
2015–2016	→ FK Veľké Revištia (loan)		
2016–2017	Burger BC 08		
2017–2018	FCM Schwerin		
2018–2019	Veres Rivne	0	(0)
2018–2019	FC Malynsk		
2019	Kingsman SC		
2021–2023	FC Vorkuta/Continentals		
2023–	Toronto Falcons		
- * Club domestic league appearances and goals as of 16 December 2019

Serhiy Pitel (Ukrainian: Сергій Анатолійович Пітел; born 10 September 1995) is a Ukrainian professional football midfielder who plays for Canadian Soccer League club Toronto Falcons.

== Club career ==
=== Early career ===
Pitel was a product of the FC Monolit Illichivsk, FC Azovstal Mariupol, and Skala Stryi School Systems. In 2012, Pitel played for FC Skala-2 Morshyn at the Amateur level. During the 2012/13 season, he was part of the Skala Stryi roster but did not play any matches.

In 2014, he joined the professional ranks by signing with Enerhiya Nova Kakhovka in the Ukrainian Second League. Pitel would make 12 appearances for Nova Kakhovka. He would sign with Ukrainian Premier League side Hoverla Uzhhorod for the 2015-16 season. He spent time with the club's reserve team where he made his debut against Shakhtar Donetsk's reserve squad on 31 July 2015.

=== Europe ===
He would be loaned out to Slovak side TJ FK Veľké Revištia for the 2015-16 season. After failing to secure a spot on the senior team with Uzhorod, he resumed his career in the regional German circuits originally with Burger BC 08. After a season with Burger BC, he signed with FCM Schwerin.

In 2018, he returned to the Ukrainian Second League to sign with Veres Rivne. He would play the remainder of the season with FC Malynsk in the national amateur league.

=== Canada ===
In the summer of 2019, ventured abroad to the Canadian Soccer League with the expansion franchise Kingsman SC. In his debut season in the Southern Ontario circuit, he helped the club clinch a playoff berth by finishing eighth in the first division. The King City-based club defeated the divisional champions Vorkuta in the opening round of the postseason. Their playoff journey would conclude in the next round after defeat by Scarborough SC. He would also participate with the Kingsman reserve squad in the league's second division, where he played in the quarterfinal match and contributed two goals against Hamilton City II.

He returned to the Canadian circuit for the 2021 season by signing with league rivals Vorkuta. In his debut season, he helped Vorkuta claim the regular season title. Pitel returned to the organization the following season under a new team named the Continentals F.C. He would assist the club in securing a postseason berth by finishing fourth in the standings. In the second portion of the playoff tournament, the Continentals would eliminate the Serbian White Eagles to advance to the championship finals. He would participate in the championship final, where they defeated Scarborough for the title.

After two seasons with the Continentals, he signed with league rivals the Toronto Falcons for the 2023 season. He played in the Royal CSL Cup final, where the Falcons would win the title after defeating the Serbs in a penalty shootout. Pitel would assist the club in finishing third in the standings.

== Honors ==
FC Continentals

- CSL Championship: 2022

Toronto Falcons

- Canadian Soccer League Royal CSL Cup: 2023

== Career statistics ==
As of 21 February 2016

Club	Season	League			Cup		Total	
Club	Season	Division	Apps	Goals	Apps	Goals	Apps	Goals
FC Enerhiya Nova Kakhovka	2014–15	Second League	12	0	1	0	13	0
FC Hoverla Uzhhorod	2015–16	Premier League	0	0	0	0	0	0
Total			12	0	1	0	13	0
