= Andriy Dankiv =

Ukrainian footballer

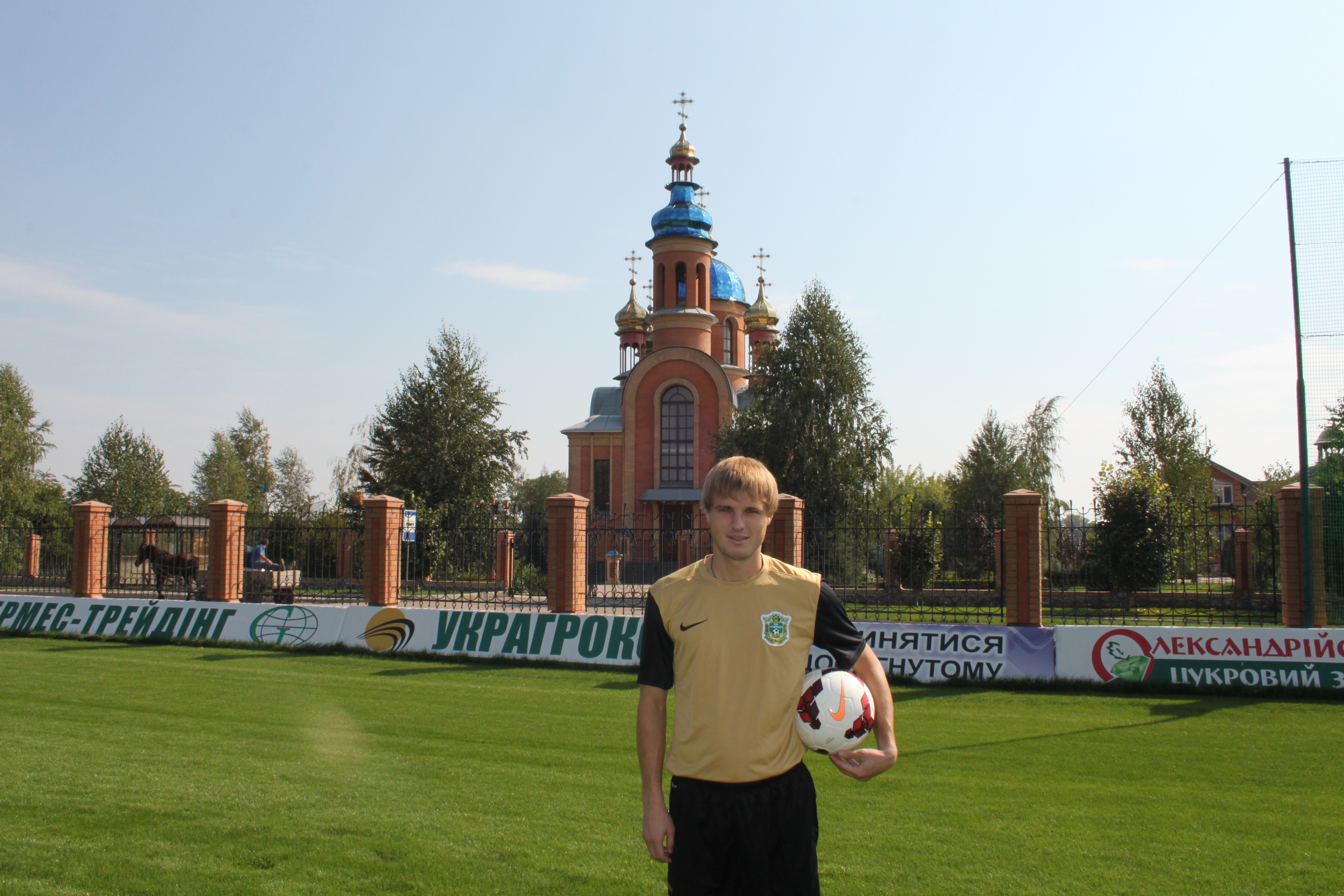
- Dankiv in 2013

Personal information
- Full name: Andriy Іhorovych Dankiv
- Date of birth: 23 January 1987 (age 39)
- Place of birth: Tseniv, Ternopil Oblast, Ukrainian SSR
- Height: 1.77 m (5 ft 9 1/2 in)
- Position: Midfielder

Youth career
- Karpaty Lviv

Senior career*
Years	Team	Apps	(Gls)
2004–2007	Karpaty Lviv	0	(0)
2005–2007	→ Karpaty-2 Lviv (loan)	49	(4)
2007–2011	Lviv	55	(6)
2009–2010	→ Enerhetyk Burshtyn (loan)	14	(2)
2011–2012	Bukovyna Chernivtsi	19	(0)
2012–2013	Poltava	24	(0)
2013–2014	UkrAhroKom Holovkivka	17	(0)
2014	FC Lapaivka	11	(1)
2015–2016	Toronto Atomic	17	(1)
2018–2019	FC Karyer Torchynovychi		
2019	FC Vorkuta		
2020–2021	Halychyna Drohobych		
2022–2023	FC Novyi Rozdil		
2024–2025	FC Lopatyn		
- * Club domestic league appearances and goals

Andriy Іhorovych Dankiv (Ukrainian: Андрій Ігорович Даньків; born 23 January 1987) is a Ukrainian former professional footballer who played as a midfielder. He spent the majority of his playing career in the Ukrainian First League and also had a stint in the Ukrainian Premier League. He later played abroad in Canada, and returned to Ukraine to play with several regional clubs. Following his retirement from competitive football, he transitioned into management.

== Club career ==
After graduating from the Karpaty Lviv youth system, the senior team signed him in 2004. Instead, he played two seasons for Karpaty Lviv's reserve team in the Ukrainian Second League.

Dankiv left Karpaty Lviv in 2007 to sign with town rival Lviv in the Ukrainian First League. In his debut season with Lviv, he played in the Ukrainian Cup against Prykarpattia Ivano-Frankivsk. Throughout the tournament, the team reached the round of 16, where they lost to Illichivets Mariupol. He also helped Lviv secure promotion to the Ukrainian Premier League. Dankiv was re-signed the next season and also debuted in the country's Premier League. The following season, Lviv were relegated, and Dankiv was loaned to Enerhetyk Burshtyn. He returned to Lviv for the remainder of the 2009-10 season. In his final season with Lviv, he played in the Oleg Makarov Memorial final, where FC Putrivka defeated them.

After four seasons with Lviv, he joined league rival Bukovyna Chernivtsi in the 2011 winter transfer market. Bukovyna re-signed him for the 2011-12 season.

He left Bukovyna during the 2012 winter transfer market, and Poltava signed him in the country's third-tier league. In his debut season, he helped Poltava secure a promotion by winning their division. The following season, he continued playing with Poltava.

After two seasons with Poltava, he signed with league rival UkrAhroKom Holovkivka. The next season, he played in the Lviv region for FC Lapaivka.

=== Canada ===
In the summer of 2015, he played in the Canadian Soccer League with Toronto Atomic FC. Dankiv debuted for Toronto on May 10, 2015, against Niagara United. He helped Toronto secure a playoff berth by finishing fifth in the league's first division. The club was eliminated from the postseason in the opening round by SC Waterloo Region. He re-signed with Toronto for the 2016 season. In his second season with the club, he helped the team secure another playoff berth. In the playoffs, the team was eliminated in the preliminary round by the Serbian White Eagles.

Dankiv returned to the CSL circuit for the 2019 season with FC Vorkuta. In his debut season with Vorkuta, he helped the club secure the league's first division title.

=== Ukraine ===
Following his stint in Canada, he returned to Ukraine and competed in the Lviv regional league for FC Karyer Torchynovychi. The next season, he played in the Ternopil regional league for FC Khatki Berezhany. In 2021, he signed with Halychyna Drohobych in the Lviv region. After a season with Halychyna, he joined FC Novyi Rozdil for the 2022 campaign. In 2025, he returned to the Lviv region to sign with FC Lopatyn.

== Managerial career ==
In 2025, he was named the under-13 youth coach for Rukh Lviv. The following season, he led the under-14 team to a championship. After the 2026 season, he was named the best coach in the under-14 group.

== Honors ==
FC Poltava

- Ukrainian Second League Group B: 2011–12

FC Vorkuta

- Canadian Soccer League First Division: 2019
