= Mykyta Tkachov =

Ukrainian footballer

Personal information
- Date of birth: 15 August 1993 (age 33)
- Place of birth: Ukraine
- Position: Defender

Team information
- Current team: Toronto Falcons

Youth career
- 2010–2011: Helio Kharkiv

Senior career*
Years	Team	Apps	(Gls)
2012–2013	Kryvbas Kryvyi Rih	0	(0)
2013–2014	Shakhtar Sverdlovsk	15	(4)
2014–2015	Krystal Kherson	15	(1)
2014–2016	Poltava	20	(0)
2015–2016	Veres Rivne	11	(0)
2016–2017	Inhulets Petrove	19	(1)
2016–2017	→ Inhulets-2 Petrove (loan)	1	(0)
2017–2018	Ukraine AC (indoor)		
2020–2022	FC Vorkuta/Continentals		
2023–	Toronto Falcons		
- * Club domestic league appearances and goals as of 20 October 2020

Mykyta Tkachov (born August 15, 1993) is a Ukrainian footballer who plays with Toronto Falcons in the Canadian Soccer League.

== Career ==
=== Ukraine ===
Tkachov began playing at the academy level in 2010 with FC Helios Kharkiv academy team. In 2012, he signed with FC Kryvbas Kryvyi Rih in the Ukrainian Premier League but failed to make an appearance for the senior team. The following season he played in the Ukrainian Second League with PFC Shakhtar Sverdlovsk. In his debut season in the third tier, he played in 15 matches and recorded 4 goals.

After a season in eastern Ukraine, he continued playing in the third tier in the southern region with Krystal Kherson. In his single season in Kherson, he played in 15 matches and scored 1 goal. For the remainder of the 2014–15 season, he played in the Ukrainian First League with FC Poltava.

In 2015, he returned to the third-tier league to secure a contract with Veres Rivne. He would serve as the team captain and assist the club in securing promotion to the second tier. In total, he played in 11 matches for Veres. He initially remained with Veres during the club's preseason camp in preparation for the 2016–17 season but ultimately departed to seek other playing options.

The next season he returned to the second tier to play with Inhulets Petrove. In his return season to the second division, he appeared in 19 matches and scored 1 goal.

=== Canada ===
He played abroad in the winter of 2017 in the Canadian-based Arena Premier League with Ukraine AC at the indoor level. In 2020, he signed a two-year contract with FC Vorkuta in the Canadian Soccer League. In his debut season in the southern Ontario circuit, he assisted Vorkuta in securing the CSL Championship against Scarborough SC.

The following season he helped the club win their third regular season title. Vorkuta would also go on to claim the ProSound Cup against Scarborough in a penalty shootout. He also made his second championship final appearance throughout the 2021 season where Vorkuta was defeated by Scarborough.

In 2022, Vorkuta was renamed FC Continentals and he re-signed with the club for the season. Throughout the 2022 season, he helped the Continentals to secure a playoff berth by finishing fourth in the standings. Tkachov made his third consecutive championship final appearance against Scarborough once more where he won his second championship title.

After the hiatus of FC Continentals for the 2023 season, he joined league rivals Toronto Falcons. Tkachov would help the Falcons finish third in the standings.

== Honors ==
FC Vorkuta

- CSL Championship: 2020, 2022
- Canadian Soccer League Regular Season: 2021
