= Vitaliy Tymofiyenko =

Ukrainian footballer

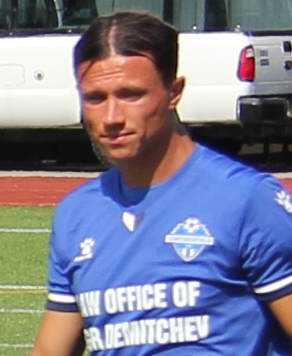
- Tymofiyenko in 2022

Personal information
- Full name: Vitaliy Viktorovych Tymofiyenko
- Date of birth: 4 January 1993 (age 33)
- Place of birth: Sloviansk, Ukraine
- Height: 1.78 m (5 ft 10 in)
- Position: Midfielder

Team information
- Current team: Toronto Falcons

Youth career
- 2008–2010: Metalurh Donetsk

Senior career*
Years	Team	Apps	(Gls)
2010–2014	Metalurh Donetsk	2	(0)
2014	→ Stal Alchevsk (loan)	17	(0)
2015	Hirnyk-Sport Komsomolsk	5	(0)
2016–2017	Avanhard Kramatorsk	18	(1)
2018–2019	Cherkashchyna-Akademiya Biloziria	37	(2)
2019–2022	Veres Rivne	38	(1)
2022	Peremoha Dnipro	0	(0)
2022	FC Continentals		
2023–	Toronto Falcons		
- * Club domestic league appearances and goals as of 12 January 2022

Vitaliy Viktorovych Tymofiyenko (Ukrainian: Віталій Вікторович Тимофієнко; born 4 January 1993) is a Ukrainian professional football midfielder who plays for Canadian Soccer League club Toronto Falcons.

== Career ==
=== Ukraine ===
Tymofiyenko was the product of the youth systems of Metalurh Donetsk. He ultimately joined the senior team and made his debut on 26 May 2013, entering as a second-half substitute against Shakhtar Donetsk in the Ukrainian Premier League. He had limited match-time opportunities as he only played in 2 games throughout his two-year stint. Metalurh loaned him out to Stal Alchevsk for the 2013–14 season in the Ukrainian First League. The Luhansk-based club signed Tymofiyenko on a permanent basis the following season.

Hirnyk-Sport Horishni Plavni acquired Tymofiyenko for the 2015–16 season. He furthered his career in the second tier by returning to his home province to play with Avanhard Kramatorsk. His first professional goal was recorded with Avanhard in a match against Naftovyk Okhtyrka on 9 November 2016. In 2017, he secured a contract with Cherkashchyna. The organization experienced financial troubles the following year, which resulted in the club being renamed and relegated to the Ukrainian Second League. The club rebounded the next season as it secured promotion to the second tier.

Tymofiyenko would remain in the third tier in 2019 by signing with Veres Rivne. After only 3 matches with Veres, he was released from his contract. Veres secured promotion to the second tier, which resulted in the recruitment of Tymofiyenko for the 2020–21 season. In his sophomore season with the western Ukrainian club, he aided in securing promotion to the top tier by winning the league title.

His return to the Premier League was short-lived as he played in only 12 matches and mutually terminated his contract with the club. Peremoha Dnipro secured the services of Tymofiyenko for the remainder of the season.

=== Canada ===
In the summer of 2022, he played abroad in southern Ontario in the Canadian Soccer League with FC Continentals. Throughout the season, he helped the club secure a postseason berth by finishing fourth in the standings. He featured in the CSL Championship final where the Continentals defeated Scarborough SC for the title.

After the hiatus of FC Continentals for the 2023 season, he joined league rivals Toronto Falcons. He helped Toronto finish third in the standings.

== Minifootball career ==
In 2023, he played with Sports Leagues Canada FC at The Soccer Tournament, finishing in second place.

== Honors ==
Veres Rivne

- Ukrainian First League: 2020–21

FC Continentals

- CSL Championship: 2022
