= Ihor Ilkiv =

Ukrainian footballer

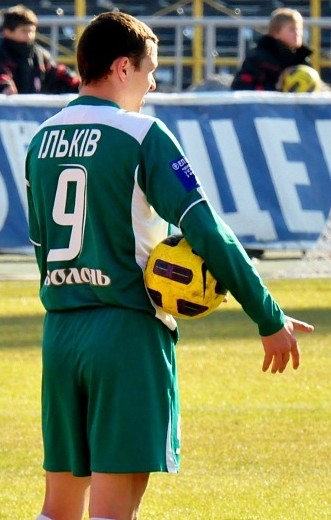

Personal information
- Full name: Ihor Bohdanovych Ilkiv
- Date of birth: 15 March 1985 (age 41)
- Place of birth: Lviv, Ukrainian SSR, Soviet Union
- Height: 1.82 m (6 ft 0 in)
- Position: Defender

Senior career*
Years	Team	Apps	(Gls)
2002–2004	Karpaty-3 Lviv	28	(0)
2002–2005	Karpaty-2 Lviv	50	(1)
2005–2007	Spartak Ivano-Frankivsk	61	(6)
2007–2011	Lviv	48	(2)
2011–2013	Obolon Kyiv	41	(0)
2013–2014	Nyva Ternopil	9	(0)
2015	Toronto Atomic		
- * Club domestic league appearances and goals

Ihor Bohdanovych Ilkiv (Ukrainian: Ігор Богданович Ільків; born 15 March 1985) is a Ukrainian professional football defender who plays for FC Rukh Vynnyky in the Ukrainian Second League.

== Playing career ==
IIkiv began his career with FC Karpaty-3 Lviv of the Ukrainian Second League. He also featured with FC Karpaty-2 Lviv in the Ukrainian First League. In 2005, he signed with FC Spartak Ivano-Frankivsk. During his tenure with FC Lviv helped the club win promotion to the Ukrainian Premier League in the 2008/2009 season. He later featured in the First League with FC Obolon-Brovar Kyiv, and FC Nyva Ternopil. In 2015, he went overseas to Canada to sign with Toronto Atomic FC of the Canadian Soccer League. In 2016, he returned to Ukraine to sign with FC Rukh Vynnyky in the Second League.
