= Denys Rylskyi =

Ukrainian footballer

Personal information
- Full name: Denys Yuriyovych Rylskyi
- Date of birth: 12 May 1989 (age 37)
- Place of birth: Ukrainian SSR, Soviet Union
- Position: Goalkeeper

Senior career*
Years	Team	Apps	(Gls)
2006–2007	Dnipro Dnipropetrovsk	0	(0)
2009–2012	Kryvbas Kryvyi Rih	0	(0)
2011–2012	→ Naftovyk-Ukrnafta Okhtyrka (loan)	17	(0)
2013	Dynamo Khmelnytskyi	5	(0)
2013–2014	Skala Stryi	20	(0)
2015–2016	Toronto Atomic FC		
2018	CSC Mississauga		
2019	Alliance United FC	1	(0)

Managerial career
- 2017–: Ukraine AC
- 2018–: Alliance United (goalkeeper coach)
- * Club domestic league appearances and goals as of 7 September 2019

Denys Yuriyovych Rylskyi (Ukrainian: Денис Юрійович Рильський; born 12 May 1989) is a Ukrainian former professional footballer who is the goalkeeper coach for Alliance United in League1 Ontario.

== Playing career ==
Rylskyi began his career in 2009 with FC Kryvbas-2 Kryvyi Rih where he appeared in a total of three matches. In 2012, he signed with FC Dynamo Khmelnytskyi in the Ukrainian Second League. Midway through the season he signed with FC Naftovyk-Ukrnafta Okhtyrka of the Ukrainian First League. In 2013, he returned to the Second League to play with FC Skala Stryi. In 2015, he played abroad with Toronto Atomic FC in the Canadian Soccer League.

In 2018, he played with CSC Mississauga. He played in one league match, as well as two playoff matches in 2019 in League1 Ontario with Alliance United FC.

== Managerial career ==
In 2017, he was named the player/coach for Ukraine AC in the Arena Premier League. In 2018, he served as a goalkeeper coach for Alliance United in League1 Ontario.
