= Vitaliy Kolyesnikov =

Ukrainian footballer

Personal information
- Full name: Vitaliy Volodymyrovych Kolyesnikov
- Date of birth: 8 December 1988 (age 37)
- Place of birth: Chernihiv, Soviet Union (now Ukraine)
- Position: Forward

Senior career*
Years	Team	Apps	(Gls)
2010	Yednist Plysky	14	(4)
2012–2013	Stal Dniprodzerzhynsk	11	(0)
2013–2014	Myr Hornostayivka	7	(0)
2014–2017	Piatykhatska Volodymyrivka/Inhulets Petrove	43	(15)
2016–2017	→ Inhulets-2 Petrove	24	(10)
2017	Myr Hornostayivka	6	(0)
2017–2018	Polissya Zhytomyr	11	(2)
2018–2019	CSC Mississauga		
2018–2019	Ukraine AC (indoor)		
2021–2022	Hungaria Vasas		
2023	FC Dynamo Toronto		
- * Club domestic league appearances and goals

Vitaliy Volodymyrovych Kolyesnikov (Ukrainian: Віталій Колєсніков; born 8 December 1988) is a Ukrainian former footballer who played as a forward.

In his early professional career, Kolyesnikov featured for several Ukrainian sides, including Stal Dniprodzerzhynsk, FC Myr Hornostayivka, FC Inhulets Petrove (helping them secure promotion to the Ukrainian First League), and FC Polissya Zhytomyr. After several years in the Ukrainian professional circuits, he finished his career in Canada.

== Club career ==
=== Ukraine ===
Kolyesnikov began his professional career in 2010 for Yednist Plysky, which competed in the Ukrainian Second League. Throughout the season, he debuted in the Ukrainian Cup against Enerhiya Nova Kakhovka. They were eliminated in the next round by Naftovyk Okhtyrka.

After a season with Yednist, he signed with league rival Stal Dniprodzerzhynsk. In total, he played in 21 games. He left Stal in 2013 to sign with Myr Hornostayivka.

In 2014, he signed with AF Piatykhatska Volodymyrivka and competed in the Ukrainian Amateur Football Championship. He helped the team win the Ukrainian Amateur Cup by defeating SCC Demnya. He also helped the club win the Kirovohrad regional league title. The following season, the club was renamed Inhulets Petrove, where he finished as the team's top goalscorer with 8 goals. He also helped the club secure promotion to the professional level, where the team re-signed Kolyesnikov for the 2015-16 season. In their debut season at the professional level, he helped the club secure a promotion to the Ukrainian First League. He also finished as the club's top goalscorer with 6 goals. The following season, he made 4 appearances with the senior team and also played for Inhulets-2 Petrove.

After four seasons in Petrove, he returned to his former club Myr Hornostayivka. After a month with Myr, he left to join league rivals Polissya Zhytomyr. On October 23, 2017, he scored his first two goals against Prykarpattia Ivano-Frankivsk.

=== Canada ===
In 2018, he played abroad in the Canadian Soccer League with CSC Mississauga. During the winter season, he signed with Ukraine AC in the Arena Premier League. Kolyesnikov re-signed with Mississauga for the 2019 season. He helped Mississauga secure a playoff berth by finishing seventh in the league's first division. Their playoff run ended in the opening round, when Scarborough SC eliminated them.

In 2021, he played in the Ontario Soccer League with Hungaria Vasas. Kolyesnikov returned to the CSL circuit in 2023 to sign with expansion side Dynamo Toronto.

== Honors ==
AF Piatykhatska Volodymyrivka

- Ukrainian Amateur Cup: 2014
- Kirovohrad Oblast Championship: 2014
