= Mykhaylo Berezovyi =

Ukrainian footballer

Personal information
- Full name: Mykhaylo Olehoych Berezovyi
- Date of birth: January 1, 1994 (age 32)
- Place of birth: Ukraine
- Position: Midfielder

Senior career*
Years	Team	Apps	(Gls)
2014–2016	Skala Stryi	42	(0)
2016	FC Sambir	9	(1)
2017–2018	Skala Stryi	21	(1)
2018–2019	CSC Mississauga		
2018–2019	Ukraine AC (indoor)		
2020-2022	→ FC Vorkuta (loan)		
- * Club domestic league appearances and goals

Mykhaylo Berezovyi (Ukrainian:Михайло Олегович Березовий; born January 1, 1994) is a Ukrainian footballer who played as a midfielder.

== Club career ==
=== Ukraine ===
Berezovyi began training at the youth academy in 2012 with Karpaty Lviv. He would play in several matches with the youth team of Karpaty in the youth championship. In 2013, he was elevated to the senior team that competed in the Ukrainian Premier League. After failing to break into the senior squad, he was released in 2014.

Following his release from Karpaty, he entered the professional ranks by signing with Skala Stryi of the Ukrainian Second League in 2014. In his debut season in the third tier, he appeared in 27 matches. Berezovyi also debuted in the Ukrainian Cup against Cherkaskyi Dnipro. He would re-sign with Skala the following season. In total, he played in 15 matches during the 2015-16 season. After two seasons with Skala, he was released by the club in the summer of 2016.

In 2016, he played in the Ukrainian Amateur League with FC Sambir, where he appeared in 9 matches and scored 1 goal. After a season in the amateur ranks, he returned to his former club, Skala, where he played in 26 matches and scored 1 goal.

=== Canada ===
In the summer of 2018, he played abroad in the southern Ontario-based Canadian Soccer League with CSC Mississauga. In the off-season, he played indoor soccer with Ukraine AC in the Arena Premier League. After the indoor season, he returned for another season with Mississauga. He helped Mississauga secure a playoff berth by finishing seventh in the league's first division. In the opening round of the postseason, he contributed a goal against Scarborough SC but was eliminated from the competition in extra time.

In 2020, he remained in the CSL and was loaned out to FC Vorkuta for the season. Berezovyi would assist Vorkuta in securing a playoff berth by finishing second in the division. He would also help the club in winning the CSL Championship by defeating Scarborough.

== Honors ==
FC Vorkuta

- CSL Championship: 2020
