= Marvin Raeburn =

Trinidad and Tobago footballer

Personal information
- Date of birth: March 7, 1975 (age 51)
- Place of birth: Scarborough, Tobago, Trinidad and Tobago
- Height: 5 ft 6 in (1.68 m)
- Position: Midfielder

Senior career*
Years	Team	Apps	(Gls)
1998	Raleigh Flyers	14	(4)
1999	Atlanta Silverbacks	15	(1)
2001–2002	Morvant Caledonia United		
2003	Metro Lions		

International career
1995–1996	Trinidad and Tobago	2	(1)
- * Club domestic league appearances and goals

Marvin Raeburn (born March 7, 1975) is a Trinidadian former footballer.

== Playing career ==
Raeburn played in the USISL A-League in 1998 with Raleigh Flyers. In 1999, he was traded to the Atlanta Silverbacks, and in 2001 he played in the TT Pro League with Morvant Caledonia United. He played abroad for the second time in 2003 with the Metro Lions in the Canadian Professional Soccer League.

== International career ==
Raeburn made his debut for the Trinidad and Tobago national football team on February 15, 1995, against Finland, where he recorded his first goal in a 2-1 victory. He made his final appearance for the national team in a friendly match on March 21, 1996, against Colombia.
