= Vasyl Zhuk =

Ukrainian footballer

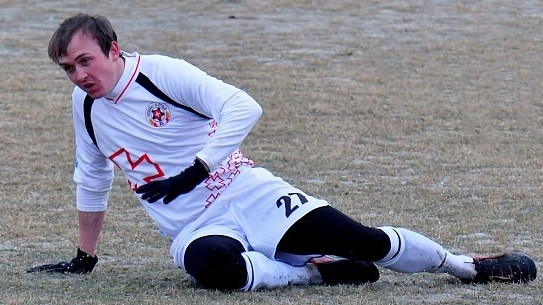

Personal information
- Full name: Vasyl Ivanoych Zhuk
- Date of birth: January 1, 1991 (age 35)
- Place of birth: Sosnivka, Ukrainian SSR, Soviet Union
- Height: 1.81 m (5 ft 11 in)
- Position: Midfielder

Youth career
- BRV-VIK Volodymyr-Volynsky

Senior career*
Years	Team	Apps	(Gls)
2008–2014	Volyn Lutsk	20	(0)
2014	FC Avanhard Zhydachiv	2	(0)
2015–2016	LKS Szaflary		
2016	Toronto Atomic		
2018–2019	Ukraine AC (indoor)		
2018–2019	Mississauga MetroStars (indoor)	1	(0)
2019	CSC Mississauga		

International career^{‡}
2007	Ukraine U16	9	(2)
2008	Ukraine U17	11	(1)
2009	Ukraine U18	7	(0)
- * Club domestic league appearances and goals as of 18 November 2019 ‡ National team caps and goals as of 18 November 2019 (UTC)

Vasyl Zhuk (born January 1, 1991) is a Ukrainian footballer who plays as a midfielder.

== Playing career ==
Zhuk began at the youth level in 2008 with BRV-VIK in Volodymyr. Shortly after he joined the professional ranks with FC Volyn Lutsk in the Ukrainian First League. He assisted Volyn in securing promotion to the Ukrainian Premier League in the 2009-10 season and made an appearance in 2011. He later played in the Ukrainian Amateur Football Championship in 2014 with FC Avanhard Zhydachiv. In 2015, he played abroad in the IV liga with LKS Szaflary.

He continued playing abroad this time in the Canadian Soccer League with Toronto Atomic the following season. In 2018, he played indoor soccer in the Arena Premier League with Ukraine AC. After a brief stint in the Arena Premier League, he signed with the Mississauga MetroStars in the Major Arena Soccer League. In 2019, he returned to the Canadian Soccer League to play with CSC Mississauga.

== International career ==
Zhuk made his international debut in 2007 with the Ukraine national under-16 football team and represented the Ukraine national under-17 football team and Ukraine national under-18 football team.
