= Sviatoslav Dziadykevych =

Ukrainian footballer

Personal information
- Full name: Sviatoslav Yuryovych Dziadykevych
- Date of birth: 6 August 1995 (age 31)
- Place of birth: Zboriv, Ukraine
- Position: Forward

Youth career
- 2012–2016: FC Karpaty Lviv

Senior career*
Years	Team	Apps	(Gls)
2016–2017	FC Chortkiv	1	(0)
2016–2017	Nyva Ternopil	15	(2)
2017–2018	Nyva Terebovlya	4	(8)
2018	Zboriv Colossus		
2018	FC Chortkiv		
2019	FC Ukraine United	16	(4)
2020	Kolos Buchach		
2023–2024	Toronto Falcons		
- * Club domestic league appearances and goals

Sviatoslav Dziadykevych (Ukrainian: Святослав Юрійович Дзядикевич; born August 6, 1995) is a Ukrainian footballer who plays as a forward.

== Club career ==
=== Ukraine ===
Dziadykevych began at the academy level with Karpaty Lviv. Ultimately, he graduated to the senior team and was placed on the reserve side in 2013.

In 2016, he played with FC Chortkiv in the Ukrainian Amateur Football League. He joined the professional ranks for the 2017-18 season to compete in the Ukrainian Second League with Nyva Ternopil. In his second season with Nyva, he competed in the 2017–18 Ukrainian Cup against Metalist 1925 Kharkiv. His stint at the professional level ended after two months when both parties mutually agreed to terminate the contract. In total, he appeared in 5 matches with Nyva.

After his tenure at the professional level, he returned to the western Ukrainian amateur circuit to play with Nyva Terebovlya. However, his season was cut short as he received an injury. In his short tenure with Terebovlya, he would appear in 4 matches and record 8 goals. In the spring of 2018, he played with Zboriv Colossus. After several months with Zboriv, he left the club in August 2018. Instead, he would complete the 2018 season with his former team, Krystal Chortkiv.

=== Canada ===
In 2019, he played abroad in the Canadian Soccer League with Ukraine United. Dziadykevych would help the western Toronto side secure a playoff berth by finishing third in the league's first division. In the opening round of the postseason, the club would defeat Hamilton City. Ukraine United would advance to the championship finals after defeating SC Waterloo Region in the semifinal round. Despite making the championship match, Scarborough SC would defeat the Ukrainians for the title.

=== Kolos Buchach ===
In 2020, he played in the Ternopil regional league with Kolos Buchach. His stint with the club was short-lived as he left the team a month later.

=== Toronto Falcons ===
Dziadykevych returned to the Canadian circuit in 2023 to play with the Toronto Falcons. He would record his first goal for the club on July 15, 2023, against Hamilton. He assisted Toronto by finishing third in the regular season standings.

== Honors ==
FC Ukraine United

- CSL Championship runner-up: 2019
