= Daryl Holmes =

New Zealand footballer

Personal information
- Full name: Daryl Holmes
- Place of birth: Nelson, New Zealand
- Height: 5 ft 10 in (1.78 m)
- Position: Defender

Youth career
- 1996: West Van F.C.

Senior career*
Years	Team	Apps	(Gls)
1997–1998	Toronto Lynx	36	(0)
1998–2002	Toronto/Mississauga Olympians	21	(0)
- * Club domestic league appearances and goals

Daryl Holmes is a New Zealand born former professional football player who played the majority of his career in North America.

== Playing career ==
Holmes played in 1996 in British Columbia in the Vancouver Metro Soccer League with West Van F.C. The following year he signed with Toronto Lynx in the USL A-League. His signing was announced in a press conference revealing the inaugural 1997 team roster. He made his debut for the club on 12 April 1997 in a match against Jacksonville Cyclones. Holmes assisted the club in qualifying for the post season for the first time in the franchise's history, by finishing 4th in the Northeastern division. The Lynx were eliminated in the first round of the playoffs against the Montreal Impact.

He returned the following year, but failed to make the postseason by finishing second last in their division. When the A-League season came to a conclusion he signed with the Toronto Olympians of the Canadian Professional Soccer League for the 1998 season. Though he joined the Olympians late in the season he contributed in the club's undefeated season which allowed them to claim the regular season championship; the first club to reach that milestone in the league's history. In the postseason he appeared in all the club's matches and contributed by scoring a goal in the semi-final match against the North York Astros in a 5–1 victory. The club reached the finals and faced St. Catharines Wolves, but were defeated in a penalty shootout denying the Scarborough-based club in accomplishing a Treble in their debut season.

In 1999, the Olympians went undefeated for the second consecutive year in a row. Within that year Holmes managed to win a Treble with the club by claiming the Canada Cup, CPSL Championship, and the League championship. In 2002, the franchise relocated to Mississauga, where he assisted in finishing second in their division.

== Honors ==
Toronto Olympians

- CPSL Championship: 1999
- Open Canada Cup: 1998, 1999
- Canadian Professional Soccer League Regular Season: 1998, 1999
