= Ihor Vitiv =

Ukrainian footballer (born 1984)

Personal information
- Full name: Ihor Josifovych Vitiv
- Date of birth: 1 April 1984 (age 42)
- Place of birth: Stryi, Ukraine SSR, Soviet Union
- Position: Goalkeeper

Senior career*
Years	Team	Apps	(Gls)
2001–2006	Skala Stryi	56	(0)
2006–2008	Obolon Kiev	0	(0)
2006–2007	→ Obolon-2 Kyiv (loan)	4	(0)
2007–2008	Krymteplytsia Molodizhne	0	(0)
2008–2009	Arsenal-Kyivshchyna Bila Tserkva	13	(0)
2008–2009	Desna Chernihiv	1	(0)
2010	Banants		
2010–2011	Desna Chernihiv	8	(0)
2010–2012	Resovia		
2012	Metalurh-2 Zaporizhzhia	3	(0)
2012–2013	Poltava	0	(0)
2012–2013	→ Poltava-2 Karlivka (loan)	30	(0)
2013–2015	Stal Kamianske	39	(0)
2015–2016	Toronto Atomic FC		
2018–2019	Ukraine AC (indoor)		
2019	FC Ukraine United		
- * Club domestic league appearances and goals

Ihor Vitiv (born 1 April 1984) is a Ukrainian former professional footballer who played as a goalkeeper.

== Playing career ==
Vitiv began his career in 2001 with FC Skala Stryi in the Ukrainian Second League. After several years in the third tier he achieved promotion to the Ukrainian First League with Obolon Kiev in 2005. He primarily played with their reserve squad FC Obolon-2 Kyiv in the Druha Liga. After failing to make an appearance with Obolon he was transferred to FC Krymteplytsia Molodizhne. He later had stints with FC Arsenal-Kyivshchyna Bila Tserkva, and FC Desna Chernihiv before heading abroad to play in the Armenian Premier League with FC Banants in 2010.

After a season in Armenia he returned to play with Desna Chernihiv. The following season he went across the border to Poland to play with Resovia in the III liga. He returned to Ukraine in 2011 to play with FC Metalurh-2 Zaporizhzhia, FC Poltava, and won promotion to the Persha Liga in 2013 with FC Stal Kamianske. In 2015, he went overseas to play in the Canadian Soccer League with Toronto Atomic FC. In his debut season he was named the CSL Goalkeeper of the Year in the Second Division.

In 2018, he played indoor soccer with Ukraine AC in the Arena Premier League. He returned to the Canadian Soccer League for the 2019 season to play with FC Ukraine United. After a three year hiatus, he returned to the CSL to play with expansion side Dynamo Toronto for the 2023 season.
