= Oleksandr Semenyuk =

Ukrainian footballer

Personal information
- Full name: Oleksandr Dmytrovych Semenyuk
- Date of birth: 20 February 1987 (age 39)
- Place of birth: Chernivtsi, Ukrainian SSR
- Height: 1.84 m (6 ft 1/2 in)
- Position: Forward

Youth career
- 2001–2002: Bukovyna Chernivtsi
- 2003–2004: Shakhtar Donetsk

Senior career*
Years	Team	Apps	(Gls)
2004–2005	Shakhtar Donetsk	0	(0)
2004–2005	Shakhtar-3 Donetsk	24	(6)
2005–2006	Bukovyna Chernivtsi	44	(25)
2007	Nyva Ternopil	24	(6)
2008–2010	Bukovyna Chernivtsi	47	(9)
2010–2011	Enerhetyk Burshtyn	35	(14)
2011–2012	Bukovyna Chernivtsi	45	(7)
2012–2013	Obolon Kyiv	6	(0)
2012–2013	→ Obolon-2 Bucha (loan)	9	(1)
2013	Bukovyna Chernivtsi	22	(3)
2014	Nyva Ternopil	25	(9)
2015	Toronto Atomic FC	21	(10)
2020	FC Vorkuta		
- * Club domestic league appearances and goals

Oleksandr Semenyuk (Ukrainian: Олександр Дмитрович Семенюк; born 20 February 1987) is a former professional Ukrainian footballer who played as a striker.

== Club career ==
=== Ukraine ===
Semenyuk was a product of the Bukovyna Chernivtsi and Shakhtar Donetsk academy system. In 2003, he joined Shakhtar Donetsk's academy and turned professional in 2004 with the club's reserve team in the Ukrainian Second League. After failing to secure a position with Donetsk's senior team, he signed a contract with Bukovyna Chernivtsi in the country's third-tier league. Throughout his first tenure with his native club, he recorded 25 goals. He secured a contract with league rivals Nyva Ternopil following a successful stint in Chernivtsi. Semenyuk's time in Ternopil lasted a season and a half before returning to Bukovyna in the spring of 2008.

In his second tenure with Bukovyna, he helped the club secure promotion to the Ukrainian First League by winning their division. However, he would debut in the country's second-tier league by signing with Enerhetyk Burshtyn in 2010. Semenyuk would finish as Burshtyn's top goalscorer with 14 goals. He left Burshtyn after one season and remained in the first league by returning to his former club, Bukovyna Chernivtsi. In 2012, he joined Obolon Kyiv for the 2012-13 season.

His tenure in the country's capital was short-lived; he returned to Bukovyna to finish off the remainder of the season. He re-signed with Bukovyna the following season. After experiencing limited playing time with Bukovyna, he returned to his former club Nyva Ternopil during the winter transfer market. Semenyuk re-signed with Ternopil for his final season in the Ukrainian circuit.

=== Canada ===
Semenyuk joined Toronto Atomic FC of the Canadian Soccer League in the summer of 2015. He recorded his first hat trick for the club on June 13, 2015, against Brampton City United. He helped Toronto secure a playoff berth by finishing fifth in the league's first division. Their playoff run ended in the opening round after a defeat by SC Waterloo Region. He finished as the club's top goalscorer with 10 goals.

In 2020, he returned to the Canadian circuit by signing with FC Vorkuta. In his debut season with Vorkuta, he helped the team win the league championship by defeating Scarborough SC.

== Honors ==
FSC Bukovyna Chernivtsi

- Ukrainian Second League: 2009–10

FC Vorkuta

- CSL Championship: 2020
