= Bohdan Polyakhov =

Ukrainian footballer

Personal information
- Full name: Bohdan Valeriyovich Polyakhov
- Date of birth: 4 June 1990 (age 36)
- Place of birth: Odesa, Ukrainian SSR, Soviet Union
- Position: Forward

Senior career*
Years	Team	Apps	(Gls)
2009–2012	FC Bastion Illichivsk	21	(9)
2009	→ FC Bastion-2 Illichivsk (loan)	2	(0)
2011–2012	FC Zirka Kropyvnytskyi	11	(2)
2011–2012	FC Nyva-V Vinnytsia	12	(0)
2012–2013	FC SKA Odesa	17	(2)
2013	FC Bastion Illichivsk	7	(1)
2013–2014	FC Karlivka	13	(1)
2014–2015	FC Real Pharma Odesa	13	(1)
2016	Toronto Atomic FC	8	(3)
2017–	Ukraine AC (indoor)	14	(8)
2018	Alliance United FC	10	(3)
- * Club domestic league appearances and goals as of January 5, 2019

Bohdan Valeriyovich Polyakhov (born 4 June 1990) is a Ukrainian footballer playing with Ukraine AC in Arena Premier League.

== Playing career ==
Polyakhov began his career in 1999 in the Ukrainian Second League with FC Bastion Illichivsk. In 2011, he played in the Ukrainian First League with FC Zirka Kropyvnytskyi, and finished the season with FC Nyva-V Vinnytsia. After the relegation of Nyva in 2012 he signed with FC SKA Odesa, while the following season he returned to FC Bastion. In 2013, he returned to the Second League to play with FC Karlivka and FC Real Pharma Odesa.

In 2016, he went overseas to Canada to sign with Toronto Atomic FC of the Canadian Soccer League. In his debut season he appeared in eight matches recorded three goals, and clinched a post-season berth by finishing fifth in the standings. In 2017, he played indoor soccer with Ukraine AC in the Arena Premier League. For the 2018 summer season he played in League1 Ontario with Alliance United FC.
