= Ivan Sozanskyi =

Ukrainian footballer

Personal information
- Full name: Ivan Mykhaylovych Sozanskyi
- Date of birth: 30 March 1994 (age 32)
- Place of birth: Cherneve, Lviv Oblast, Ukraine
- Position: Forward

Senior career*
Years	Team	Apps	(Gls)
2011–2014	FC Skala Stryi	22	(0)
2013–2014	GKS Aleksandria Aleksandrów	8	(0)
2013–2016	Cosmos Jozefow	21	(16)
2016	Toronto Atomic FC	3	(1)
2017–2018	Ukraine AC (indoor)	14	(3)
2019–	CSC Mississauga		
- * Club domestic league appearances and goals

Ivan Sozanskyi (Ukrainian: Іван Михайлович Созанський; born March 3, 1994) is a Ukrainian footballer who plays with CSC Mississauga in the Canadian Soccer League.

== Playing career ==
Sozanskyi began his career in 2011 with FC Skala Stryi in the Ukrainian Second League. After four seasons with Skala he played abroad in the IV liga with GKS Aleksandria Aleksandrów, and Cosmos Jozefow. In 2016, he went overseas to sign with Toronto Atomic FC in the Canadian Soccer League. In his debut season he appeared in three matches, and recorded one goal. In 2017, he played indoor soccer with Ukraine AC in the Arena Premier League.

In 2019, he returned to the Canadian Soccer League to play with CSC Mississauga.
