= Toronto Atomic FC =

- Full name: Toronto Atomic Selects Football Club
- Founded: 2013 (12 years ago) (as Atomic Selects Toronto FC )
- Dissolved: 2020 (5 years ago)
- Owner(s): Ihor Prokipchuk
- League: Canadian Soccer League (2015–2016); Arena Premier League (2017–2019)
| Home colours | Away colours |

Toronto Atomic FC was a Canadian soccer club that was founded in 2013. The club was based in Toronto, Ontario, and originally joined the Canadian Soccer League (CSL) as an expansion team in 2015. It fielded a senior and reserve team throughout its time in the league.

After two seasons in the CSL circuit, Toronto left the league and operated an indoor team in the Arena Premier League under the name Ukraine AC. In 2020, the league dissolved along with its member clubs. Toronto also operated several youth teams in the Canadian Academy of Futbol (CAF).

== History ==
Atomic Selects Toronto FC was formed in 2013 as a soccer academy by HVAC contractor Ihor Prokipchuk. On February 10, 2015 Toronto Atomic joined the professional ranks as an expansion franchise in the Canadian Soccer League. The club received territorial rights in Etobicoke a district of Toronto and Centennial Park Stadium would serve as their home venue. Toronto Atomic secured the services of Ihor Yavorskyi as head coach with previous experience in the Ukrainian Premier League. Yavorskyi was able to acquire players who played in the Ukrainian top tier like Vasyl Shpuk, Ihor Ilkiv, Ihor Melnyk, Igor Migalevskyy, Andriy Dankiv, Mykhaylo Basarab, Oleksandr Semenyuk, Volodymyr Plishka, Denys Rylsky, Oleksandr Tomakh, and Stanislav Katana. The club made its CSL debut on May 9, 2015 in a 3-0 victory over Niagara United with Migalevskyy, Melnyk, and Mykola Voytsekhovskyy contributing the goals. Midway through the season Yavorskyi was dismissed from his post with Vasyl Ishchak being named his successor.

Ishchak managed to secure a postseason for the organization by finishing fifth in the overall standings. Their opponents in the quarterfinals were SC Waterloo, but lost the match by a score of 2-0. At the conclusion of the season Toronto received two league awards one for Ihor Melnyk as CSL Rookie of the Year, and Ishchak for CSL Coach of the Year. In preparations for the 2016 season Atomic extended Ischak contract, and named Michael Tischer team captain. Serhiy Konyushenko was appointed the head coach for the reserve team in the CSL Second Division. Toronto Atomic entered a team in the newly formed CAF LIKA Supergroup open division.

Toronto brought in further imports from Ukraine signing Ivan Sozansky, Ostap Talochka, Roman Sakhno, Bohdan Polyakhov, and Canadian international Terry Dunfield. For the second straight season Toronto secured a postseason berth by finishing fifth in the standings. In the preliminary round of the playoffs Atomic were eliminated from the competition after a 1-0 loss to the Serbian White Eagles. In the Second Division the reserve team finished second in the regular season, and reached the CSL D2 Championship final where they faced the York Region Shooters B, but suffered a 2-1 defeat.

In 2017, Toronto Atomic discontinued the use of their senior team in the CSL, but continued fielding a team in the CAF LIKA Supergroup Open Division.

In 2017, Toronto Atomic began fielding an indoor team, and became a founding member in the Arena Premier League as Ukraine AC.

== Roster ==
As of January 3, 2019

Note: Flags indicate national team as defined under FIFA eligibility rules; some limited exceptions apply. Players may hold more than one non-FIFA nationality.

| No. | Pos. | Nation | Player |
|---|---|---|---|
| 4 | | | Jemel Taylor |
| 5 | MF | (Ukraine) UKR | Denis Dyachenko |
| 6 | | | Nazapii Drahan |
| 7 | | | Liubomir Holovinskiy |
| 9 | MF | (Ukraine) UKR | Roman Sakhno |
| 10 | FW | (Ukraine) UKR | Bohdan Polyakhov |
| 11 | FW | (Ukraine) UKR | Vitaliy Kolesnikov |

| No. | Pos. | Nation | Player |
|---|---|---|---|
| 12 | | | Christiano Alvez |
| 13 | | | Serge Marchak |
| 15 | MF | (Ukraine) UKR | Mykhaylo Berezovyi |
| 16 | MF | (Ukraine) UKR | Vasyl Zhuk |
| 17 | | | Maskyiy Rokovskyi |
| 19 | | | Yevheuii Potazochenko |
| — | GK | (Ukraine) UKR | Ihor Vitiv |

== Head coaches ==
Toronto Atomic

- Ihor Yavorskyi (2015)
- Vasyl Ishchak (2015–2016)
- Andrii Melnyk & Denys Rylskyi & Oleh Yatsura (2017–2019)

Toronto Atomic II

- Vasyl Ishchak (2015)
- Serhiy Konyushenko (2016)

== Honours ==
Toronto Atomic II

- CSL II Championship runner-up: 2016
- Canadian Soccer League Second Division runner-up: 2016

== Seasons ==
=== First team ===
| Season | League | Teams | Record | Rank | Playoffs | Ref |
|---|---|---|---|---|---|---|
| 2015 | Canadian Soccer League (First Division) | 12 | 10–2–10 | 5th | Quarterfinals | |
| 2016 | Canadian Soccer League (First Division) | 8 | 8–6–7 | 5th | Quarterfinals | |
| 2017–18 | Arena Premier League (International Division) | 7 | 6–4–10 | 5th | Semifinals | |
| 2018–19 | Arena Premier League (International Division) | 6 | | | | |

=== Second team ===
| Season | League | Teams | Record | Rank | Playoffs | Ref |
|---|---|---|---|---|---|---|
| 2015 | Canadian Soccer League (Second Division) | 10 | 7–3–8 | 3rd | Quarterfinals | |
| 2016 | Canadian Soccer League (Second Division) | 6 | 9–2–4 | 2nd | Finals | |
