= Preston Corporal =

Liberian footballer

- Corporal in 2010

Personal information
- Full name: Preston Papie Corporal
- Date of birth: 9 March 1987 (age 39)
- Place of birth: Buchanan, Liberia
- Position: Forward

Senior career*
Years	Team	Apps	(Gls)
2002–2004	Watanga FC		
2005–2008	ATM FA	54	(36)
2006–2007	→ Mohammedan S.C. (loan)		(2)
2009–2010	Village United F.C.		
2010	Hamilton Croatia	16	(6)
2012	Brantford Galaxy	3	(0)
2013	Niagara United	14	(1)

International career
2008	Liberia	1	(0)
- * Club domestic league appearances and goals

Preston Corporal (born March 9, 1987) is a Liberian former footballer who played as a forward in the Liberian Premier League, Malaysian Super League, National Football League, National Premier League, and the Canadian Soccer League.

== Playing career ==
Corporal began his career in 2002 with Watanga FC of the Liberian Second Division League, and at the conclusion of the season he was named the Liberia Football Association Most Valuable Player. In 2005, he went overseas to sign with ATM FA of the Malaysia Super League. Where in his debut season he bagged a total of 36 goals in all competitions. The following season he was loaned to a four-month deal to Mohammedan S.C. of the National Football League, to help the club escape relegation. In 2009, he signed with Village United F.C. of the National Premier League. In 2010, Corporal signed with Hamilton Croatia of the Canadian Soccer League. He made his debut for the club on June 11, 2010 in a match against Brantford Galaxy. He helped Croatia finish third in the overall standings, and clinched a postseason berth.

In the playoffs Corporal contributed by scoring two goals in the quarterfinal series match against TFC Academy. He featured in the CSL Championship match against Brantford Galaxy, but Hamilton would lose the match to a score of 3-0. In 2012, former Hamilton Croatia head coach Ron Davidson recruited Corporal when he was appointed head coach for Brantford Galaxy. He made his debut for the club on May 6, 2012 in a match against York Region Shooters. In 2013, he signed with Niagara United, and his signing was announced on May 8, 2013.

== International career ==
Corporal made his debut for the Liberia national football team on October 11, 2008 in the 2010 FIFA World Cup qualification – CAF second round match against Algeria.
