= Oleksandr Tomakh (footballer, born 1993) =

Ukrainian footballer

Personal information
- Full name: Oleksandr Oleksandrovych Tomakh
- Date of birth: 17 January 1993 (age 33)
- Place of birth: Zaporizhya, Ukraine
- Height: 1.79 m (5 ft 10 1/2 in)
- Position: Defender

Youth career
- 2006–2008: FC Dynamo Zaporizhya
- 2008–2010: FC Shakhtar Donetsk

Senior career*
| Years | Team | Apps | (Gls) |
| 2010–2011 | FC Arsenal Kyiv | 0 | (0) |
| 2011 | FC Chornomorets-2 Odesa | 15 | (1) |
| 2012 | FC UkrAhroKom Holovkivka | 3 | (0) |
| 2013 | FC Odesa | 10 | (0) |
| 2014 | NK Istra 1961 | 0 | (0) |
| 2014 | →NK Rovinj | 15 | (0) |
| 2014–2015 | NK Dugopolje | 0 | (0) |
| 2015 | Toronto Atomic FC | 14 | (2) |
- * Club domestic league appearances and goals as of 23 June 2015

Oleksandr Tomakh (Ukrainian: Олександр Олександрович Томах; born 17 January 1993) is a Ukrainian football defender.

== Career ==
Tomakh was born in a family with a strong football tradition - he is a grandson of Oleksandr Tomakh. He is a product of the FC Dynamo Zaporizhya and Shakhtar Donetsk youth sportive schools and signed a contract with FC Arsenal Kyiv in the Ukrainian Premier League in 2010, but did not appear in any games for this team.

In January 2014 he signed a 1.5-years contract with NK Istra 1961. In 2015, he played overseas with Toronto Atomic FC in the Canadian Soccer League.

== See also ==
- Oleksandr Tomakh (footballer born 1948)
