= FC VPK-Ahro Shevchenkivka =

- Full name: FC VPK-Ahro
- Founded: 2011
- Dissolved: 2022
- Ground: Kolos Arena, Mahdalynivka; Meteor Stadium, Dnipro
- Capacity: 1,500 (Kolos Arena); 24,381 (Meteor Stadium)
- 2021–22: Ukrainian First League, 14th of 16 (withdrew)
- Website: www.fc-vpkagro.com.ua
Home colours	Away colours

FC VPK-Ahro was a Ukrainian professional club from Shevchenkivka, Novomoskovsk Raion.

Until 2019, it has competed in the regional competitions of Dnipropetrovsk Oblast and Ukrainian amateur competitions.

In 2013–2014, the club was based out of Dnipro playing at Molodizhny Park Stadium. In 2015, VPK-Ahro played in Novooleksandrivka at Yuvileiny Stadium.

== History ==
The club was founded in 2010 and sponsored by local agrarian company VPK-Ahro, hence the club's name. The club's president Volodymyr Korsun used to play for the club's predecessor FC Druzhba Mahdalynivka.

In 2013, the club along with another club from Dnipro, FC Pobieda Dnipro, fielded a joint team Pobieda–VPK-Ahro in regional competitions for a season, but it did not perform well.

The club was dissolved in 2022 due to the Russian invasion of Ukraine.

== Honours ==
- Ukrainian Second League
  - Winners (1): 2019–20
- Football championship of Dnipropetrovsk Oblast
  - Winners (3): 2014, 2016, 2018
  - Runners-up (2): 2015, 2017
- Football cup of Dnipropetrovsk Oblast
  - Winners (1): 2017
  - Runners-up (1): 2012, 2017

== League and cup history ==
Season	Div.	Pos.	Pl.	W	D	L	GS	GA	P	Domestic Cup	Other		Notes
2012–2014	regional competitions (Dnipropetrovsk Oblast)												
2014	4th "3"	3/4	6	2	2	2	5	8	8		UAC	1/8 finals	First stage
2015	4th "3"	4/4	6	1	1	4	5	13	4				First stage
2015–2018	regional competitions (Dnipropetrovsk Oblast)												
2018–19	4th "3"	1/12	22	16	5	1	60	12	53		UAC	1/16 finals	Play-offs – Winner
2018–19	4th "3"	1/12	22	16	5	1	60	12	53		UAC	1/16 finals	Admitted to SL
2019–20	3rd "B"	1/11	20	15	3	2	47	15	48	1/64 finals			Promoted
2020–21	2nd	10/16	30	11	4	15	30	48	37	1/8 finals			
2021–22	2nd	14/16	20	5	3	12	16	28	18				

== Coaches ==
- 2013 – 2013 Serhiy Taranenko
- 2014 – 2014 Yevhen Proshenko
- 2015 – 2015 Yevhen Pronenko
- 2016 – 2016 Serhiy Taranenko
- 2017 – 2021 Serhiy Solovyov
- 2021 Oleksandr Hrytsay
- 2021 – 2022 Oleksandr Poklonskyi
