= Toronto Falcons (2022–present) =

- Full name: Toronto Falcons Football Club
- Nickname: The Falcons
- Founded: 2022
- Stadium: Centennial Park Stadium, Toronto, Ontario, Canada
- Capacity: 2,200
- Head coach: Maksym Rohovskyi
- League: Canadian Soccer League
- 2023: Regular season: 3rd Playoffs: N/A
Home colours	Away colours

Toronto Falcons Football Club is a soccer team based in Toronto, Ontario, Canada. The team is a member of the Canadian Soccer League.

== Players ==
=== Current squad ===
As of October 9, 2023

Note: Flags indicate national team as defined under FIFA eligibility rules; some limited exceptions apply. Players may hold more than one non-FIFA nationality.

No.	Pos.	Nation	Player
–	FW	UKR	Kyrylo Antonenko
–	MF	UKR	Bohdan Borovskyi
–	MF	UKR	Denys Diachenko
–	FW	UKR	Sviatoslav Dziadykevych
–	DF	UKR	Adam Fiks
–	FW	UKR	Evgeny Fiks
–	DF	UKR	Liubomyr Holovinskyi
–	FW	UKR	Rinat Kasymgereev
–	DF	UKR	Stanislav Katana
–	FW	UKR	Oleksandr Lakusta
–	MF	UKR	Vasyl Matviyshin

No.	Pos.	Nation	Player
–	MF	CAN	Zhane Gendunov
–	DF	UKR	Oleksandr Novikov
–	DF	UKR	Maksym Rohovskyi
–	FW	GEO	Nemo Shelia
–	GK	UKR	Vasyl Shpuk
–	MF	UKR	Iaroslav Solonynko
–	DF	UKR	Volodymyr Sydorenko
–	DF	UKR	Mykyta Tkachov
–	MF	UKR	Vitaliy Tymofiyenko
–	DF	UKR	Andriy Voloshyn

== Year-by-year ==
Year	League	Division	GP	W	L	T	Pts	Regular season	Playoffs
2022	CSL	First	10	1	5	4	7	5th	Did not qualify
