= Football Association of Dnipropetrovsk Oblast =

Football Association of Dnipropetrovsk Oblast is a football governing body in the region of Dnipropetrovsk Oblast, Ukraine. The association is a member of the Regional Council of UAF and the collective member of the UAF itself.

== Heads of the organization ==
- ????–???? ?
- 2001–2016 Andriy Pavelko
- 2016–present Viktor Andrukhiv

== Previous Champions ==
- 1936 FC Avanhard Melitopol
- 1937 FC Avanhard Melitopol (2)
- 1938 FC Stal Dniprodzerzhynsk
- 1939 FC Stal Kryvyi Rih
- 1940-44 World War II
- 1945 FC Stal Dniprodzerzhynsk (2)
- 1946 FC Stal Dniprodzerzhynsk (3)
- 1947 FC Stal Dniprodzerzhynsk (4)
- 1948 FC Stal Dniprodzerzhynsk (5)
- 1949 FC Metalurh Dniprodzerzhynsk (6)
- 1950 Dzerzhynets (7) & Metalurh
- 1951 FC Trud Dnipropetrovsk
- 1952 FC Trud Dnipropetrovsk (2)
- 1953 FC Khimik-ZShU Dniprodzerzhynsk
- 1954 FC Khimik-ZShU Dniprodzerzhynsk (2)
- 1955 Liebknecht Mine Kryvyi Rih
- 1956 ???
- 1957 FC Avanhard Terny
- 1958 FC Avanhard Zhovti Vody
- 1959 BKKhZ Dniprodzerzhynsk
- 1960 FC Metalurh Nikopol (2)
- 1961 FC Trubnyk Nikopol (3)
- 1962 FC Avanhard Dnipropetrovsk
- 1963 FC Avanhard Ordzhonikidze
- 1964 ???
- 1965 FC Avanhard Terny
- 1966 FC Meteor Dnipropetrovsk
- 1967 FC Avanhard Vilnohirsk
- 1968 FC Avanhard Vilnohirsk (2)
- 1969 FC Avanhard Ordzhonikidze
- 1970 FC Avanhard Kryvyi Rih
- 1971 FC Avanhard Vilnohirsk (3)
- 1972 FC Silhosptekhnika Nikopol
- 1973 FC Avanhard Vilnohirsk (4)
- 1974 FC Vykhor Dnipropetrovsk
- 1975 FC Kolos Nikopol (2)
- 1976 ZKL Dnipropetrovsk
- 1977 ???
- 1978 FC Metalurh Dniprodzerzhynsk (8)
- 1979 FC Vykhor Dnipropetrovsk (2)
- 1980 FC Vykhor Dnipropetrovsk (3)
- 1981 FC Vykhor Dnipropetrovsk (4)
- 1982 FC Hirnyk Pavlohrad
- 1983 FC Metal Dnipropetrovsk
- 1984 FC Tytan Vilnohirsk
- 1985 FC Avanhard Ordzhonikidze (2)
- 1986 FC Hirnyk Pavlohrad (2)
- 1987 FC Metal Dnipropetrovsk (2)
- 1988 FC Metalurh Dniprodzerzhynsk (9)
- 1989 FC Avanhard Zhovti Vody (2)
- 1990 FC Metalurh Kryvyi Rih
- 1991 FC Press Dnipropetrovsk
- =independence of Ukraine=
- 1992 FC Metalurh Dniprodzerzhynsk (10)
- 1992-93 FC Metalurh Novomoskovsk
- 1993-94 FC Metalurh Kryvyi Rih (2)
- 1994-95 FC Zirka-Dnipro Novomoskovsk
- 1995 FC Budivelnyk Kryvyi Rih
- 1996 FC Druzhba Mahdalynivka
- 1997 FC Ahrovest Novooleksandrivka
- 1998 FC Metal Dnipropetrvosk (3)
- 1999 FC Metal Dnipropetrvosk (4)
- 2000 FC Metal Dnipropetrovsk (5)
- 2001 FC Hirnyk Kryvyi Rih (2)
- 2002 FC Hirnyk Kryvyi Rih (3)
- 2003 PK Dniprovsky Nikopol
- 2004 FC Kolos Chkalove
- 2005 FC Kolos Chkalove (2)
- 2006 FC Kolos Chkalove (3)
- 2007 FC Atlant Kryvyi Rih
- 2008 FC Avio Dnipropetrovsk
- 2009 FC Fakel Petrykivka
- 2010 FC Kolos Chkalove (4)
- 2011 FC Kolos Chkalove (5)
- 2012 FC Kolos Chkalove (6)
- 2013 UVD Dnipropetrovsk
- =Russo-Ukrainian War=
- 2014 FC VPK-Ahro Shevchenkivka
- 2015 FC Lozuvatka
- 2016 FC VPK-Ahro Shevchenkivka (2)
- 2017 FC Kryvyi Rih
- 2018 FC VPK-Ahro Shevchenkivka (3)
- 2019 FC Skoruk Tomakivka
- 2020-21 FC Skoruk Tomakivka (2)
- =full-scale Russian invasion=

=== Top winners ===
- 10 - FC Stal (Metalurh) Dniprodzerzhynsk
- 6 - FC Kolos Chkalove
- 5 - FC Metal Dnipropetrovsk
- 4 - FC Avanhard Vilnohirsk
- 4 - FC Vykhor Dnipropetrovsk
- 3 - 4 clubs (Trubnyk (Metalurh), Avanhard O., Hirnyk (Liebknecht Mine), VPK-Ahro)
- 2 - 9 clubs
- 1 - 20 clubs

== Professional clubs ==
locations of all professional clubs and "teams of maters"
- FC Dynamo Dnipropetrovsk, 1936-1937 (3 seasons)
- FC Stal Dniprpetrovsk, 1936, 1967 (3 seasons)
- FC Lokomotiv Dnipropetrovsk, 1937, 1968, 1969 (3 seasons)
- FC Dnipro (Stal, Metallurg), 1937, 1939, 1946-1949, 1953-2018 (72 seasons)
  - Dnipro-2, 1997-2004, 2010-2012 (9 seasons)
  - Dnipro-3, 2000-2002 (2 seasons)
- SC Prometei Dniprodzerzhynsk (Khimik, Dneprovets), 1957-1970 (14 seasons)
- FC Kryvbas Kryvyi Rih (Kryvyi Rih, Avangard, Gornyak), 1959-2013, 2018- (52 seasons)
  - Kryvbas-2, 1998-2001, 2003-2004, 2005-2006 (5 seasons)
- FC Sirius Zhovti Vody (Avangard), 1960-1970, 1993-1995 (13 seasons)
- FC Trubnik Nikopol, 1962-1970 (9 seasons)
- FC Elektrometalurh-NZF Nikopol (Kolos, Metalurh), 1976-2005 (30 seasons)
- FC Stal Kamianske (Metalurh), 1979-1985, 2001-2018 (24 seasons)
- FC Kosmos Pavlohrad (Kolos, Shakhtar), 1981-1996 (16 seasons)

- FC Prometei Dniprodzerzhynsk, 1992-1993, 1995-1996 (2 seasons)
- FC Metalurh Novomoskovsk, 1994-1999 (5 seasons)
- FC Sportinvest Kryvyi Rih, 1995-1996 (a season)
- FC Hirnyk Pavlohrad, 1997-1998 (a season)
- FC Hirnyk Kryvyi Rih, 2004-2016 (12 seasons)
- FC Dnipro-75 Dnipropetrovsk, 2008-2010 (2 seasons)
- FC Nikopol (Makiivvuhillia Makiivka), 2015-2023 (8 seasons)
- SC Dnipro-1, 2017-2024 (7 seasons)
- FC VPK-Ahro Shevchenkivka, 2019-2022 (3 seasons)
- FC Peremoha Dnipro, 2020-2022 (2 seasons)
- FC Skoruk Tomakivka, 2021-2023 (2 seasons)

== Other clubs at national/republican level ==
Note: the list includes clubs that played at republican competitions before 1959 and the amateur or KFK competitions after 1964.

- Dnipro Dnipropetrovsk (z-d im. Petrovskoho/Metalurh), 1936, 1950, 1957, 2018-19
- Dniprodzerzhynsk, 1936
- Kryvyi Rih, 1936
- Ordzhonikidze, 1936–1938
- Metalurh Dniprodzerzhynsk (Stal), 1937–1940, 1948–1952, 1958, 1977, 1978, 1989, 1992-93, 2001
- Spartak Dnipropetrovsk, 1937–1940, 1946
- Synelnykove, 1937
- Rot Front Kryvyi Rih, 1937
- Lokomotyv Synelnykove, 1938, 1982
- Metalurh Kryvyi Rih (Stal), 1938, 1948, 1949, 1951, 1952, 1955, 1958, 1991
- Lokomotyv Dnipropetrovsk, 1939, 1948–1950, 1996-97
- Spartak Kryvyi Rih, 1939, 1948, 1950
- Stakhanovets Ordzhonikidze, 1939, 1940
- Dynamo Dnipropetrovsk, 1946–1949, 1951, 1952
- Metalurh Nikopol, 1949, 1954–1959
- Khimik Pavlohrad, 1949
- Metalurh Novomoskovsk, 1949, 1993-94
- Torpedo Dnipropetrovsk, 1950, 1951
- Mashynobudivnyk Dnipropetrovsk, 1952–1954, 1956, 1958, 1959
- Khimik Dniprodzerzhynsk, 1953–1956
- Dnipropetrovsk, 1955
- Kryvbas/Kryvbas-2 Kryvyi Rih (r/u imeni Dzerzhynskoho), 1956, 1957, 1993-94, 1994-95, 2016, 2017-18, 2020-21
- Hirnyk Kryvyi Rih (r/u imeni Libknekhta), 1956, 2000 – 2004
- Avanhard Ordzhonikidze, 1957–1959, 1964, 1970 – 1972, 1986, 1987, 1990
- Avanhard Zhovti Vody, 1958, 1959, 1990 – 1992/93
- Shakhtar Terny, 1958
- Avanhard Dniprodzerzhynsk, 1959
- r/u imeni Kominterna Kryvyi Rih, 1959
- Avanhard Terny, 1965, 1966
- Avanhard Vilnohirsk, 1967 – 1969, 1971, 1972, 1974, 1978 – 1980
- ZKL Dnipropetrovsk, 1970, 1977 – 1981
- Avanhard Kryvyi Rih, 1971 – 1973, 1979 – 1981
- Vikhr Dnipropetrovsk, 1971, 1975, 1976
- Elektrometalurh Nikopol (Kolos), 1972, 1974, 1975, 2006, 2010
- Pres Dnipropetrovsk, 1977 – 1980
- Kolos Pavlohrad, 1977 – 1980
- Avtomobilist Ordzhonikidze, 1982
- Hirnyk Pavlohrad, 1983 – 1985, 1988 – 1994-95
- Kolos Vasylkivka, 1985
- Prometei Dniprodzerzhynsk (1986, 1990, 1991, 1993-94, 1994-95
- Inhulets Kryvyi Rih, 1987, 1988
- Olimpia Pokrovske, 1989, 1990
- Shakhtar Ordzhonikidze, 1991
- Budivelnyk Kryvyi Rih, 1992-93 – 1995-96
- Shakhtar Marhanets, 1993-94, 1994-95
- Kolos Chkalove, 1993-94
- SportInvest Kryvyi Rih, 1994-95
- Era Nikopol, 1994-95
- Kryvbas-Ruda Kryvyi Rih, 1994-95, 1996-97
- Druzhba Mahdalynivka, 1994-95
- Obriy Nikopol, 1996/97
- Orion Dnipropetrovsk, 2001
- Dnipro-75 Dnipropetrovsk, 2008
- VPK-Ahro Shevchenkivka, 2014, 2015, 2018-19
- Peremoha Dnipro, 2018-19, 2019-20
- FC Kryvyi Rih, 2018-19
- Skoruk Tomakivka, 2018-19, 2020-21
- Borysfen Dnipro, 2019-20, 2020-21
- Lehioner Dnipro, 2019-20 – 2021-22
- Olimp Kamianske, 2021-22
- Penuel Kryvyi Rih, 2023-24, 2024-25

== Notable footballers ==
=== Soviet Union national football team ===
- Anatoliy Demyanenko
- Oleh Protasov
- Hennadiy Lytovchenko
- Sergey Shavlo
- Pavlo Yakovenko
- Vladimir Pilguy
- Vadym Yevtushenko
- Volodymyr Lyutyi
- Vladimir Maslachenko
- Ivan Hetsko
- Leonid Shmuts
- Mykola Fedorenko

=== Ukraine national football team ===
- Yaroslav Rakitskyi
- Viktor Skrypnyk
- Artem Kravets
- Serhiy Bezhenar
- Oleksandr Svatok
- Andriy Polunin
- Serhiy Diryavka
- Vitaliy Reva
- Serhiy Zakarlyuka
- Oleksandr Rykun
- Yevhen Shakhov
- Yehor Yarmolyuk
- Hennadiy Moroz
- Valeriy Vorobyov
- Dmytro Topchiyev
- Ivan Hetsko
- Hennadiy Lytovchenko
- Oleksandr Nazarenko
- Oleksiy Antonov
- Oleksandr Kyryukhin
- Dmytro Ivanisenya
- Yuriy Kolomoyets
- Serhiy Perkhun
- Oleksandr Poklonskyi
- Oleh Protasov

== See also ==
- FFU Council of Regions
