= Niagara United =

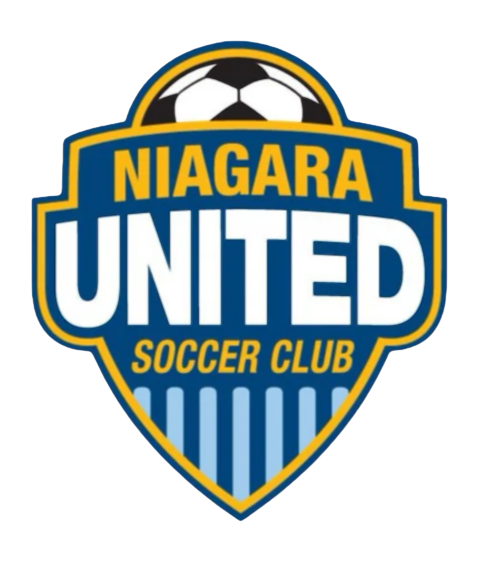
- Full name: Niagara United Soccer Club
- Founded: 1973; 53 years ago
- Ground: Kalar Sports Park; Niagara Falls, Ontario
- Capacity: 1,000
- President: Tracy Singer
- Technical Director: Lynn Phillips Sam Blakely
- Website: niagaraunitedsoccer.ca

Niagara United Soccer Club, commonly referred to as Niagara United, is a Canadian soccer club founded in 1973. The club is a former member of the Canadian Soccer League (CSL), where it fielded a professional team from 2011-2015, and now operates competitive youth teams in the Niagara Soccer League (NSL), Hamilton Soccer League (HSL), Golden Horseshoe Soccer League (GHSL), and Ontario Soccer's Integrated Model (IModel). The teams play their home matches at Kalar Sports Park in Niagara Falls, Ontario.

In 2011, the club joined the CSL and played in the CSL Second Division. After a successful debut season Niagara was promoted to the First Division, and qualified for the playoffs in their first season in the top flight. The following season the club went through a rebuilding stage focusing on developing and recruiting local players.

In 2016, Niagara United announced its departure from the Canadian Soccer League.

In December of 2023, the club announced their affiliation agreement with Juventus Academy Toronto to establish a youth academy player development program.

== History ==
Niagara United was formed in 1973 as Niagara Falls Girls Soccer Club by the City of Niagara Falls. The club initially was a non-profit organization to foster an all-female youth development. In 2010, this was changed to welcome both genders.

=== Canadian Soccer League (2011–2015) ===
In 2011, Niagara United were elevated to the professional ranks by joining the Canadian Soccer League, and competed in the CSL Second Division. Former St. Catharines Wolves head coach James McGillivray was appointed for the role of head coach. Niagara debuted in the Canadian Soccer League on May 14, 2011, drawing their first match on the road against York Region Shooters 2-2. The team played their first home fixture against Toronto FC Academy on May 21, 2011. In their debut season, the club clinched the Western Division title and reached the semi-finals of the playoffs. At the end of the 2011 season, McGillivary received the "Fair Play and Respect" award and was named "Coach of the Year". On June 28, 2011, Niagara United hosted a friendly match against Bedlington Terriers FC, then playing in the English Northern Football League, losing 4-1.

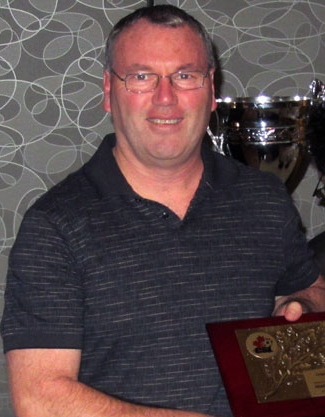
Former CSL Coach of the Year James McGillivray, instrumental in bringing professional soccer to Niagara

On April 3, 2012, the CSL announced the promotion of Niagara United to the First Division. Kalar Sports Park the team's home ground received several grants in order to accommodate the facility for CSL standards. McGillivray maintained the majority of his veterans from the previous season with the addition of American imports with PDL experience. Niagara made their professional debut on May 26, 2012 in a sellout crowd against Brantford Galaxy which resulted in a narrow 2-1 defeat, with Derek Paterson scoring the lone goal. In their debut season in the First Division, the team clinched the final playoff berth. Their playoff run came to an end in the quarter-final, losing 2-0 against eventual winners Toronto Croatia. For the second season in a row, McGillivary was named "Coach of the Year" while Malcolm Mings won the Defender of the Year award.

For the 2013 season, McGillivary re-signed the majority of his players with notable additions such as Preston Corporal, Keith Makubuya, and Gary Boughton. Despite new signings, the 2013 season marked the first time the organization experienced complete failure as it finished at the bottom of the overall standings.

In 2014, McGillivary relinquished his head coach responsibilities to Bruno Reis. Niagara's fourth season was marked with injuries, shortage of talent, and a lack of player commitment which resulted once more in a last place finish in the overall standings.

In 2015, Niagara appointed David Currie as the new head coach. Currie applied a philosophy focused on recruiting local players from the Niagara region. The 2015 season would go on to be the club's worst in their professional record, as Currie's side conceded 71 goals in 21 matches, earning a total of only nine points. Having finished bottom of the standings for a third consecutive year, the club announced on April 3, 2016 that they would not return to the CSL for the 2016 season.

On October 4, 2015, Niagara was involved in a controversial match against SC Waterloo, where a suspicion of match fixing on Waterloo's part resulted in a full-time stoppage at the 65th minute.

=== Affiliation (2023–2026) ===
Niagara United entered into an affiliation with Juventus Academy Niagara in 2023. As part of the agreement, competitive youth teams entering the under-13 I Model division were rebranded as Juventus Academy Niagara. As of 2025, the affiliated teams from Niagara United and JAN have achieved success, winning 12 major trophies, completing both a historic double and treble within the first two seasons (including one provincial title, five league titles, and two league cups). This agreement has ceased as of November, 2026 and all competitive teams are branded as Niagara United.

== See also ==
- Canadian Soccer League
