= 2015 Canadian Soccer League season =

Professional soccer league season

Canadian Soccer League First Division
- Season: 2015
- Dates: May 9 – October 4 (regular season); October 10 – October 25 (playoffs)
- Champions: Serbian White Eagles (First Division regular season); Toronto Croatia (First Division playoffs, 10th title)
- Matches: 132
- Goals: 444 (3.36 per match)
- Top goalscorer: Richard West (23)
- Biggest home win: Toronto Croatia 7-0 Scarborough SC (July 25, 2015)
- Biggest away win: Niagara United 1-9 York Region Shooters (September 26, 2015)

The 2015 Canadian Soccer League season was the 18th since its establishment where a total of 22 teams from Ontario took part in the league. The season began on May 9, 2015, and concluded on October 25, 2015. Toronto Croatia won their sixth championship (ninth including Canadian National Soccer League titles) in a 1–0 victory over SC Waterloo in the CSL Championship final held at Warrior Field in Waterloo, Ontario. In the regular season, the Serbian White Eagles clinched their fourth regular-season title, while Milton SC won their first second division championship.

The First Division saw an increase to 12 teams, while the Second Division remained the same. New additions to the first division were the return of Brantford Galaxy along with Toronto Atomic, and Scarborough SC as expansion franchises. Founding member North York Astros disbanded their professional team while Kingston FC departed to apply for League1 Ontario.

== First Division ==
=== Changes from 2014 ===
The number of clubs in the First Division saw an increase to 12 teams of the 10 teams that played in the First Division in 2014, eight returned. The departing clubs were North York Astros a charter club with history in the Canadian National Soccer League. The other member included Kingston FC, which had intentions of applying to League1 Ontario. After a two-year hiatus, Brantford Galaxy returned to the fold. Two new teams joined for 2015, Scarborough SC, and Toronto Atomic FC.

Toronto Atomic was granted a franchise after operating an academy in the Canadian Academy of Futbol (CAF). The acceptance of Atomic marked the return of a Ukrainian presence in the league since the 1981 season when Toronto Ukrainians played in the predecessor league. Scarborough SC was the brainchild of former player Kiril Dimitrov to provide professional soccer to the Scarborough territory. A third team, Milton SC, joined from the Second Division. Notable reforms were accepted at the 2015 annual general meeting of team owners where the allowance of import players was increased. On April 8, 2015, the league unveiled its new logo with the inclusion of the date when the league was formed under the National Soccer League banner.

=== Teams ===
Team	City	Stadium	Manager
Brampton United	Brampton (Bramalea)	Victoria Park Stadium	Juan Barreto
Brantford Galaxy	Brantford	Steve Brown Sports Complex	Tomo Dančetović
Burlington SC	Burlington	Nelson Stadium	William Etchu Tabi
London City	London	Hellenic Centre Stadium	Josip Dzale
Milton SC	Milton (Timberlea)	Jean Vanier Catholic Secondary School	Jasmin Halkic
Niagara United	Niagara Falls	Kalar Sports Park	David Currie
Scarborough SC	Toronto (North York)	Downsview Park	Kiril Dimitrov
SC Waterloo Region	Waterloo	Warrior Field	Lazo Džepina
Serbian White Eagles	Toronto (Etobicoke)	Centennial Park Stadium	Uroš Stamatović
Toronto Atomic FC	Toronto (Etobicoke)	Centennial Park Stadium	Vasyl Ishchak
Toronto Croatia	Mississauga	Centennial Park Stadium	Velimir Crljen
York Region Shooters	Vaughan (Maple)	Joan of Arc Turf Field	Tony De Thomasis

==== Coaching changes ====
Team	Outgoing coach	Manner of departure	Date of vacancy	Position in table	Incoming coach	Date of appointment
Toronto Atomic FC	(Ukraine) Ihor Yavorskyi	Resigned	August 15, 2015	6th in August	(Ukraine) Vasyl Ishchak	August 15, 2015

Location of teams outside of Toronto for the 2015 CSL season.
Location of teams in or near Toronto for the 2015 CSL season.

=== Results ===
Home \ Away	BRA	BRG	BSC	LON	MIL	NIA	SCB	SCW	SER	TAT	TOR	YRS
Brampton United		3–1	2–1	4–1	3–4	0–2	1–1	0–2	1–1	0–1	1–3	0–2
Brantford Galaxy	1–2		0–2	2–0	3–4	3–1	2–4	2–0	0–2	2–0	1–4	3–2
Burlington SC	5–0	1–2		0–2	3–2	4–3	4–3	2–1	0–5	1–3	1–1	0–2
London City	0–0	1–0	1–3		1–3	2–1	3–3	0–1	0–2	3–1	3–2	2–7
Milton SC	0–2	3–3	4–2	3–1		3–0	1–1	1–0	0–2	1–4	0–4	2–0
Niagara United	0–0	3–2	1–8	1–4	0–0		1–2	1–2	1–4	2–6	0–3	1–9
Scarborough SC	0–6	1–1	1–1	1–0	1–4	3–3		2–1	1–1	1–4	2–1	3–1
SC Waterloo Region	2–1	3–0	3–0	1–2	2–0	– (Note: One match between SC Waterloo Region and Niagara United was abandoned in the 65th minute)	2–1		2–2	4–2	1–5	4–1
Serbian White Eagles	3–1	2–0	2–2	4–0	2–0	7–1	1–0	0–1		2–1	2–1	0–3
Toronto Atomic	4–1	0–3	2–0	4–2	2–0	3–0	0–0	1–1	1–5		1–2	1–2
Toronto Croatia	1–1	5–0	2–0	1–0	3–1	2–0	7–0	0–0	0–1	4–2		3–1
York Region Shooters	2–1	1–1	2–1	2–3	3–0	4–1	4–1	4–1	1–2	3–2	0–3	

Updated to match(es) played on October 4, 2015. Source: http://canadiansoccerleague.ca/first-division-schedule/
Legend: Blue = home team win; Yellow = draw; Red = away team win.

=== Standings ===
Pos	Team	Pld	W	D	L	GF	GA	GD	Pts	Qualification
1	Serbian White Eagles (A, C)	22	16	4	2	52	17	+35	52	Qualification for Playoffs
2	Toronto Croatia (A, O)	22	15	3	4	57	18	+39	48	Qualification for Playoffs
3	York Region Shooters (A)	22	13	1	8	56	35	+21	40	Qualification for Playoffs
4	SC Waterloo Region (A)	21	11	3	7	34	27	+7	36 (Note: One match between SC Waterloo Region and Niagara United not played)	Qualification for Playoffs
5	Toronto Atomic FC (A)	22	10	2	10	23	37	−14	32	Qualification for Playoffs
6	Burlington SC (A)	22	8	3	11	41	44	−3	27	Qualification for Playoffs
7	Milton SC (A)	22	8	3	11	32	43	−11	27	Qualification for Playoffs
8	London City (A)	22	8	2	12	31	46	−15	26	Qualification for Playoffs
9	Brampton United	22	7	5	10	31	33	−2	26	
10	Scarborough SC	22	6	8	8	32	49	−17	26	
11	Brantford Galaxy	22	7	3	12	32	44	−12	24	
12	Niagara United	21	2	3	16	23	71	−48	9	

Updated to match(es) played on October 4, 2015. Source: []
Rules for classification: 1) points; 2) goal difference; 3) number of goals scored.
(A) Advance to a further round; (C) Champions; (O) Play-off winners

=== Season statistics ===
==== Goals ====
Rank	Player	Club	Goals
1	(Jamaica) Richard West	York Region Shooters	23
2	(Croatia) Zdenko Jurčević	Brantford Galaxy	21
3	(Canada) Sahjah Reid	Serbian White Eagles	18
4	(Bosnia and Herzegovina) Adis Hasečić	SC Waterloo Region	16
5	Jose De Sousa	Scarborough SC	15
6	Darren Chambers	Toronto Croatia	12
6	(Serbia) Vladimir Vujović	Burlington SC	12
8	(Bosnia and Herzegovina) Jure Glavina	Toronto Croatia	11
9	(Croatia) Josip Keran	Toronto Croatia	10
9	(Ukraine) Oleksandr Semenyuk	Toronto Atomic FC	10

==== Hat-tricks ====
Player	Club	Against	Result	Date
(Croatia) Marin Vučemilović-Grgić	London City	Scarborough SC	3–3 (H)	9 May 2015
(Croatia) Tihomir Maletic	Toronto Croatia	Toronto Atomic FC	4–2 (H)	30 May 2015
(Serbia) Vladimir Vujović	Burlington SC	Brampton City United	5–0 (H)	31 May 2015
(Serbia) Vladimir Vujović	Burlington SC	Niagara United	8–1 (A)	6 June 2015
(Croatia) Zdenko Jurčević	Brantford Galaxy	Niagara United	3–1 (H)	10 June 2015
(Ukraine) Oleksandr Semenyuk	Toronto Atomic FC	Brampton City United	4–1 (H)	13 June 2015
(Bosnia and Herzegovina) Adis Hasečić	SC Waterloo Region	Burlington SC	3–0 (H)	14 June 2015
(Canada) Sahjah Reid	Serbian White Eagles	London City	4–0 (H)	19 June 2015
(Canada) Jonathan Jebbison	Brampton City United	Brantford Galaxy	3–1 (H)	21 June 2015
(Jamaica) Richard West	York Region Shooters	SC Waterloo Region	4–1 (H)	26 July 2015
(Canada) Jonathan Jebbison	Brampton City United	Scarborough SC	6–0 (A)	15 August 2015
(Bosnia and Herzegovina) Jure Glavina	Toronto Croatia	Brantford Galaxy	5–0 (H)	5 September 2015
(Jamaica) Richard West	York Region Shooters	Niagara United	9–1 (A)	25 September 2015
(Jamaica) Richard West	York Region Shooters	London City	7–2 (A)	27 September 2015
Amardo Oakley	Burlington SC	Scarborough SC	4–3 (H)	4 October 2015
(Bosnia and Herzegovina) Adnan Smajić	Milton SC	Brantford Galaxy	4–3 (H)	5 October 2015

=== Playoffs ===
==== Bracket ====
The top 8 teams qualified for the one-game quarter final, and a one-game semifinal that lead to the championship game played on October 25 at Warrior Field in Waterloo, Ontario.

Quarterfinals
1	Serbian White Eagles	1
8	London City	0
4	SC Waterloo	2
5	Toronto Atomic FC	0
2	Toronto Croatia	4
7	Milton SC	0
3	York Region Shooters	4
6	Burlington SC	2

Semifinals
1	Serbian White Eagles	2
4	SC Waterloo	3
2	Toronto Croatia	3
3	York Region Shooters	2

Final
4	SC Waterloo	0
2	Toronto Croatia	1

==== Quarterfinals ====
October 10, 2015	Serbian White Eagles	1–0	London City	Toronto, Ontario
19:00	Vukomanović 69'	Report		Stadium: Centennial Park Stadium; Attendance: 400; Referee: Marco Jaramillo

October 11, 2015	SC Waterloo	2–0	Toronto Atomic FC	Waterloo, Ontario
16:00	Stojiljković (red card) 38'; Milanović 48'; Hasečić 90'	Report	Michael Tischer (red card) 60'; Mihalevskyy (red card) 66'; Melnyk (red card) 80'	Stadium: Warrior Field

October 11, 2015	Toronto Croatia	4–0	Milton SC	Toronto, Ontario
19:00	Glavina 10', 58', 70'; Brown 13'	Report		Stadium: Centennial Park Stadium

October 11, 2015	York Region Shooters	4–2	Burlington SC	Vaughan, Ontario
18:00	West 10', 36', 92'; Stojanovski 40'	Report	Camilo Veloza 18', 50'	Stadium: Joan of Arc Turf Field

==== Semifinals ====
October 17, 2015	Serbian White Eagles	2–3	SC Waterloo	Toronto, Ontario
19:00	Vukomanović (?); Medić 96'	Report	Zeljković 4'; Mohammad-Ali Heydarpour 71'; Hasečić 85'	Stadium: Centennial Park Stadium

October 18, 2015	Toronto Croatia	3–2 (a.e.t.)	York Region Shooters	Toronto, Ontario
19:00	Keran 81'; Tomislav Zadro 107'; Fresenga 113'	Report	Edwards 24'; Andrei Spatary 106'	Stadium: Centennial Park Stadium

==== CSL Championship ====
October 25, 2015	SC Waterloo	0–1	Toronto Croatia	Waterloo, Ontario
16:00		Report	Cordon 46'	Stadium: Warrior Field

=== Individual awards ===
The annual CSL awards ceremony was held in Kitchener, Ontario. The Most Valuable Player award went to Josip Keran of Toronto Croatia. The York Region Shooters went home with two accolades with the CSL Golden Boot going to former Jamaican international Richard West, and Cyndy De Thomasis was honored with the Harry Paul Gauss award. Burlington SC received the most awards with three wins. Firstly the club was given the Fair Play award, while Andrew Stinger and Nikola Stanojevic were selected as the Goalkeeper and Defender of the Year.

Ihor Melnyk, a former Ukrainian Premier League veteran was named the Rookie of the Year, and Vasyl Ishcak was voted the Coach of the Year after clinching Toronto Atomic's first postseason berth. Goran Babic was voted the Referee of the Year by the CSL Referee Committee.

Award	Player (Club)
CSL Most Valuable Player	Josip Keran (Toronto Croatia)
CSL Golden Boot	Richard West (York Region Shooters)
CSL Goalkeeper of the Year Award	Andrew Stinger (Burlington SC)
CSL Defender of the Year Award	Nikola Stanojevic (Burlington SC)
CSL Rookie of the Year Award	Ihor Melnyk (Toronto Atomic)
CSL Coach of the Year Award	Vasyl Ishchak (Toronto Atomic)
Harry Paul Gauss Award	Cyndy De Thomasis (York Region Shooters)
CSL Referee of the Year Award	Goran Babic
CSL Fair Play Award	Burlington SC

== Second Division ==
Canadian Soccer League Second Division
- Season: 2015
- Champions: SC Waterloo B (Second Division regular season); Milton SC B (Second Division playoffs)
- Matches: 90
- Goals: 390 (4.33 per match)
- Top goalscorer: Nikola Miokovic (15)
- Biggest home win: SCW B 12-0 SER B
- Biggest away win: SER B 0-9 BRG B

=== Teams ===
Of the 9 teams that played in the Second Division in 2014, seven returned. Kingston FC B left when their senior team left the First Division. Milton SC moved to the First Division and their reserve team joined the Second Division. Brantford Galaxy B returned when their senior team returned to the First Division after a two-year hiatus. Toronto Atomic FC B joined when their senior team joined the First Division.

Team	City	Stadium	Manager
Brampton United B	Brampton	Victoria Park Stadium	Mike DiMatteo
Brantford Galaxy B	Brantford	Steve Brown Sports Complex	Anthony Giaitzis
Burlington SC B	Burlington	Nelson Stadium	
Milton SC B	Toronto	Jean Vanier Catholic Secondary School	Osman Begovic
Niagara United B	Niagara Falls	Kalar Sports Park	James McGillivery
SC Waterloo Region B	Waterloo	Warrior Field	Lazo Dzepina
Serbian White Eagles B	Toronto	Centennial Park Stadium	Goran Bakoc
Toronto Atomic FC B	Toronto	Centennial Park Stadium	Vasyl Ishchak
Toronto Croatia B	Mississauga	Centennial Park Stadium	Daniel Jaksic
York Region Shooters B	Vaughan	Joan of Arc Turf Field	Gilbert Amaral

=== Results ===
Home \ Away	BRA	BRG	BSC	MIL	NIA	SCW	SER	TAT	TOR	YRS
Brampton United		4–1	1–1	1–1	0–2	1–3	4–2	1–3	4–2	1–3
Brantford Galaxy	3–2		2–1	2–0	1–3	2–2	0–2	3–2	1–4	2–1
Burlington SC	2–1	0–1		1–1	4–2	1–0	4–3	2–1	3–1	4–1
Milton SC	4–2	1–0	4–2		1–3	1–1	9–0	4–4	1–2	3–1
Niagara United	2–2	2–3	1–1	0–1		1–4	2–0	2–2	4–1	3–4
SC Waterloo Region	1–1	1–0	3–0	1–2	4–2		12–0	5–5	2–0	2–3
Serbian White Eagles	3–2	0–9	2–4	1–1	1–1	2–2		0–5	3–1	0–0
Toronto Atomic	2–0	2–1	2–3	1–2	2–0	0–3	0–2		5–1	0–3
Toronto Croatia	1–0	3–4	4–1	3–5	3–3	3–3	3–8	1–2		0–2
York Region Shooters	1–0	3–1	4–0	0–5	3–5	1–3	3–2	6–4	6–2	

Updated to match(es) played on October 5, 2015. Source: http://canadiansoccerleague.ca/second-division-schedule-2/
Legend: Blue = home team win; Yellow = draw; Red = away team win.

=== Standings ===
Pos	Team	Pld	W	D	L	GF	GA	GD	Pts	Qualification
1	SC Waterloo Region B (A, C)	18	10	6	2	58	23	+35	36	Qualification for Playoffs
2	York Region Shooters B (A)	18	11	1	6	45	37	+8	34	Qualification for Playoffs
3	Milton SC B (A, O)	18	9	5	4	44	31	+13	32	Qualification for Playoffs
4	Burlington SC B (A)	18	9	3	6	34	34	0	30	Qualification for Playoffs
5	Brantford Galaxy B (A)	18	9	1	8	36	33	+3	28	Qualification for Playoffs
6	Toronto Atomic FC B (A)	18	7	3	8	42	39	+3	24	Qualification for Playoffs
7	Niagara United B (A)	18	6	5	7	38	37	+1	23	Qualification for Playoffs
8	Serbian White Eagles B (A)	18	5	4	9	31	62	−31	19	Qualification for Playoffs
9	Toronto Croatia B	18	4	2	12	35	57	−22	14	
10	Brampton United B	18	3	4	11	27	37	−10	13	

Updated to match(es) played on October 5, 2015. Source: http://canadiansoccerleague.ca/2015-2nd-division-standings/
Rules for classification: 1) points; 2) goal difference; 3) number of goals scored.
(A) Advance to a further round; (C) Champions; (O) Play-off winners

=== Top goal scorers ===
Rank	Player	Club	Goals
1	(Canada) Nikola Miokovic	SC Waterloo Region B	15
2	(Jamaica) Amardo Oakley	Burlington SC B	12
2	Edward Syllie	SC Waterloo Region B	12
4	Lucky Maghori	Milton SC B	11
5	Raphael Barboza DaSilva	York Region Shooters B	9
5	(Bosnia and Herzegovina) Adnan Smajić	Milton SC B	9
7	Camilo Veloza	Burlington SC B	8
8	Matthew Arbin	Brampton United B	7
8	(Canada) Milan Beader	Brantford Galaxy B	7
8	Serhiy Marchak	Toronto Atomic FC B	7
8	Aljay Sharkail Wilson	Toronto Croatia B	7

Updated: December 17, 2015
Source: http://canadiansoccerleague.ca/2015-second-division-stats/

=== Playoffs ===
==== Bracket ====
The top 8 teams qualified for the one-game quarterfinal, and a one-game semifinal that lead to the championship game played on October 25 at Warrior Field in Waterloo, Ontario.

Quarterfinals
1	SC Waterloo Region B	5
8	Serbian White Eagles B	0
2	York Region Shooters B	4 (3)
7	Niagara United B	4 (4)
3	Milton SC B	6
6	Toronto Atomic FC B	0
5	Brantford Galaxy B	1
4	Burlington SC B	0

Semifinals
1	SC Waterloo Region B	5
7	Niagara United B	1
3	Milton SC B	3
5	Brantford Galaxy B	0

Final
1	SC Waterloo Region B	1
3	Milton SC B	3

==== Quarterfinals ====
October 10, 2015	SC Waterloo Region B	5–0	Serbian White Eagles B	Waterloo, Ontario
16:00	Nikola Mirković (?); Mohammad-Ali Heydarpour (?); Edward Syllie (?); Kevin Benavides (?); Johnson Luyiga (?)	Report		Stadium: Warrior Field

October 11, 2015	York Region Shooters B	4–4 (a.e.t.) (3-4 p)	Niagara United B	Vaughan, Ontario
20:00		Report		Stadium: Joan of Arc Turf Field

October 11, 2015	Milton SC B	6–0	Toronto Atomic FC B	Toronto, Ontario
15:00		Report		Stadium: Jean Vanier Catholic Secondary School

October 9, 2015	Brantford Galaxy B	1–0	Burlington SC B	Burlington, Ontario
20:00	Simo Vrakela 88'	Report		Stadium: Nelson Stadium

==== Semifinals ====
October 18, 2015	SC Waterloo Region B	5–1	Niagara United B	Waterloo, Ontario
15:00	Dzenan Karic 35'; Mohammad-Ali Heydarpour 50'; Stojiljkovic 65', 89'; Edward Syllie 68'	Report	Derek Paterson (?)	Stadium: RIM Park

October 18, 2015	Milton SC B	3–0	Brantford Galaxy B	Toronto, Ontario
15:30	Delvin Mathurin 17'; Lucky Maghori 41'; Keitu Smith (red card) 75'; Stephan Cameron 83'	Report	Simo Vrakela (red card) 89'	Stadium: Jean Vanier Catholic Secondary School

==== Second Division Championship ====
October 24, 2015	Milton SC B	3–1 (a.e.t.)	SC Waterloo Region B	Waterloo, Ontario
13:00	Danny Jirta 88'; Smajić 91'; Lucky Maghori 106'	Report	Edward Syllie 47'	Stadium: Warrior Field

=== Individual awards ===
Award	Player (Club)
CSL Most Valuable Player	Arsenije Japalak (Brantford Galaxy B)
CSL Golden Boot	Nikola Miokovic (Burlington SC B)
CSL Goalkeeper of the Year Award	Ihor Vitiv (Toronto Atomic B)
CSL Defender of the Year Award	Namanjar Sudar (Brantford Galaxy B)
CSL Rookie of the Year Award	Kingma Zach (Brantford Galaxy B)
CSL Coach of the Year Award	Amir Osmanlic (Milton SC)
