= 2014 Canadian Soccer League season =

Professional soccer league season

Canadian Soccer League First Division
- Season: 2014
- Dates: May 24 – October 5 (regular season); October 12 – October 26 (playoffs)
- Champions: York Region Shooters (regular season); York Region Shooters (playoffs)
- Matches: 90
- Goals: 386 (4.29 per match)
- Top goalscorer: 20 goals: Marin Vučemilović-Grgić
- Best goalkeeper: Vladimir Vujasinović
- Biggest home win: Serbian White Eagles 6–0 Burlington SC (June 15)
- Biggest away win: Niagara United 0–6 Toronto Croatia (August 24)
- Highest scoring: 9 goals: Kingston FC 5–4 Toronto Croatia (September 21)

The 2014 Canadian Soccer League season was the 17th since its establishment where a total of 20 teams from Ontario took part in the league. The season began on May 24, 2014, and concluded on October 26, 2014. York Region Shooters won their second championship in a 5–4 victory in a penalty shootout over Toronto Croatia in the CSL Championship final held at Esther Shiner Stadium in Toronto. York Region became the second club in the league's history to produce a perfect season, and championship after the Toronto Olympians in the 1999 season.

The league's strained relationship with the Canadian Soccer Association continued before the launch of the 2014 season with the CSA expelling the CSL from its membership over alleged violations of rules and regulations in order to make way for a lesser structure in Ontario. After failing to specify which rule violations were made and without providing a formal hearing in order to discuss the issues the CSL in response filed litigation against the CSA. The league operated as a private league for the first time since the 1997 season in its predecessor league the Canadian National Soccer League. Though they did join the newly formed Soccer Federation of Canada, which provides private soccer entities the services needed such as administration of players, non-playing personnel, match officials and insurance.

Once the CSL was de-sanctioned the league decreased in membership to 10 teams in the first division with Windsor Stars joining the newly formed League1 Ontario, while founding member St. Catharines Roma Wolves disbanded their professional team while still operating their youth teams. Meanwhile, the second division increased in size to 10 teams with Milton SC joining along with the addition of Winstars Shooters the reserve team for the York Region Shooters after its affiliation arrangement with the Winstars Soccer Academy. The league formed an working relationship with the American Soccer League in order to assist in areas of competition and business. While its youth development system continued its progress with more than 40 former CSL players being selected for various national teams in the last four seasons. This Week in the CSL the league's weekly television show hosted by producer Alex Bastyovanszky continued covering the CSL with Ethnic Channels Group distributing the program.

== First division ==
=== Teams ===
All of the 10 teams playing in the first division this year are returning from the 2013 season. From the previous year, two teams are not part of the league anymore: Windsor Stars, who will be part of the newly formed League1 Ontario, and St. Catharines Roma Wolves.

Team	City	Stadium	Manager
Brampton United	Brampton (Bramalea)	Victoria Park Stadium	Juan Barreto
Burlington SC	Burlington	Nelson Stadium	William Etchu Tabi
Kingston FC	Kingston	Queen's West Field	Colm Muldoon
London City	London	Hellenic Com Centre	Tomo Dancetovic
Niagara United	Niagara Falls	Kalar Park Sports Field	Bruno Reis
North York Astros	Toronto (North York)	Esther Shiner Stadium	Jorge Collazo
SC Waterloo Region	Waterloo	Warrior Field	Lazo Džepina
Serbian White Eagles	Toronto (Liberty Village)	Lamport Stadium	Uroš Stamatović
Toronto Croatia	Mississauga	Hershey Field	Velimir Crljen
York Region Shooters	Vaughan (Maple)	St. Joan of Arc Field	Darryl Gomez

==== Coaching changes ====
Team	Outgoing coach	Manner of departure	Date of vacancy	Position in table	Incoming coach	Date of appointment
North York Astros	Josef Komlodi	Resigned	July 17, 2014	5th in July	Igor Pisanjuk	July 17, 2014
North York Astros	Igor Pisanjuk	End of interim spell	August 4, 2014	6th in August	Jorge Collazo	August 4, 2014

Location of CSL teams outside of Toronto for the 2014 CSL season.
Location of CSL teams in Toronto for the 2014 CSL season.

=== Results ===
Home \ Away	BRA	BSC	KFC	LON	NIA	NYA	SCW	SER	TOR	YRS
Brampton United		0–2	0–1	0–1	3–0	0–5	0–1	1–0	0–1	1–1
Burlington SC	1–3		0–4	1–2	4–2	0–3	2–1	0–0	0–0	1–4
Kingston FC	4–1	1–2		3–5	2–1	1–2	4–4	0–1	5–4	2–2
London City	2–3	2–3	2–2		0–6	1–1	5–2	1–0	2–4	1–4
Niagara United	0–2	1–1	0–4	4–1		0–2	2–6	1–1	0–6	0–4
North York Astros	1–0	4–0	3–3	1–2	0–1		4–1	0–2	1–3	1–1
SC Waterloo Region	1–3	3–4	4–2	2–1	2–0	1–1		0–4	2–2	0–4
Serbian White Eagles	1–1	6–0	1–3	5–1	6–3	1–1	1–2		1–2	1–1
Toronto Croatia	3–1	0–2	3–4	2–1	3–1	1–0	1–1	2–1		1–2
York Region Shooters	0–0	1–0	3–2	3–1	2–1	4–1	2–0	1–0	3–2	

Updated to match(es) played on July 6, 2014. Source: Various Team Websites
Legend: Blue = home team win; Yellow = draw; Red = away team win.

=== Positions by round ===
Team ╲ Round	1	2	3	4	5	6	7	8	9	10	11	12	13	14	15	16	17	18
Burlington SC	3	1	3	6	7	2	2	2	2	2	3	3	4	4	5	4	6	5
Niagara United	1	2	4	2	2	3	3	5	5	7	8	9	9	10	10	10	10	10
Brampton United	2	3	1	5	5	7	8	8	8	9	8	5	6	6	7	9	8	8
Serbian White Eagles	4	4	5	3	4	5	4	4	3	4	5	6	7	7	6	7	9	6
York Region Shooters	5	5	2	1	1	1	1	1	1	1	1	1	1	1	1	1	1	1
Kingston FC	6	6	6	7	3	4	3	3	4	3	4	4	5	5	4	5	4	3
Toronto Croatia	9	7	7	4	6	6	7	7	5	5	2	2	2	2	2	2	2	2
London City	10	8	8	8	9	10	10	9	9	10	10	10	9	9	8	6	5	9
SC Waterloo Region	7	9	10	9	8	8	9	10	10	7	7	8	8	8	9	8	7	7
North York Astros	8	10	9	10	10	9	6	6	6	6	6	7	3	3	3	3	3	4

Source: canadiansoccerleague.ca

=== Standings ===
Pos	Team	Pld	W	D	L	GF	GA	GD	Pts	Qualification
1	York Region Shooters (A, C, O)	18	13	5	0	42	15	+27	44	Qualification for Playoffs
2	Toronto Croatia (A)	18	10	3	5	40	27	+13	33	Qualification for Playoffs
3	Kingston FC (A)	18	8	4	6	47	38	+9	28	Qualification for Playoffs
4	Astros Vasas (A)	18	7	5	6	31	22	+9	26	Qualification for Playoffs
5	Burlington SC (A)	18	7	3	8	23	37	−14	24	Qualification for Playoffs
6	Serbian White Eagles (A)	18	6	5	7	32	20	+12	23	Qualification for Playoffs
7	SC Waterloo Region (A)	18	6	4	8	33	42	−9	22	Qualification for Playoffs
8	Brampton United (A)	18	6	3	9	19	25	−6	21	Qualification for Playoffs
9	London City	18	6	2	10	31	46	−15	20	
10	Niagara United	18	3	2	13	23	49	−26	11	

Source: []
Rules for classification: 1) points; 2) goal difference; 3) number of goals scored.
(A) Advance to a further round; (C) Champions; (O) Play-off winners

=== Goal scorers ===
Rank	Player	Club	Goals
1	(Croatia) Marin Vučemilović-Grgić	London City	20
2	(Croatia) Dražen Vuković	SC Waterloo Region	16
3	(France) Guillaume Surot	London City	12
4	(Canada) Jose De Sousa	North York Astros	10
5	(Canada) Joey Melo	North York Astros	9
6	(Romania) Cătălin Lichioiu	Kingston FC	8
6	(Canada) Sahjah Reid	Serbian White Eagles	8
8	(Canada) Leaford Allen	Brampton City United	7
8	(Senegal) Mademba Ba	Kingston FC	7
8	(Croatia) Pero Menalo	Toronto Croatia	7

=== Bracket ===
Quarterfinals
1	York Region Shooters	3
8	Brampton United	0
4	North York Astros	4
5	Burlington SC	0
2	Toronto Croatia	4
7	SC Waterloo	2
3	Kingston FC	3
6	Serbian White Eagles	0

Semifinals
1	York Region Shooters	1
4	North York Astros	0
2	Toronto Croatia	2
3	Kingston FC	1

Final
1	York Region Shooters	1 (5)
2	Toronto Croatia	1 (4)

==== Quarterfinals ====
October 11, 2014	Toronto Croatia	4–2	SC Waterloo Region	Mississauga, Ontario
19:00	Menalo 15'; Živković 33', 90'; Daniel Niksic 83'	Report	Bailey 65'; Hasečić 79'	Stadium: Hershey Centre

October 11, 2014	Kingston FC	3–0 (a.e.t.)	Serbian White Eagles	Kingston, Ontario
18:15	Edgar Soglo 111'; Mademba Ba 113', 116'	Report		Stadium: Queen's West Field

October 12, 2014	North York Astros	4–0	Burlington SC	Toronto, Ontario
15:30	Pisanjuk 39'; Melo 43'; Jose De Sousa 78'; Marko Janković (?)	Report		Stadium: Esther Shiner Stadium

October 12, 2014	York Region Shooters	3–0	Brampton United	Maple, Ontario
18:00	Oswald Adu 16'; West 79'; Mackie 90+1'	Report		Stadium: Joan of Arc Turf Field

==== Semifinals ====
October 19, 2014	York Region Shooters	1–0	North York Astros	Maple, Ontario
18:00	Mackie 78'	Report		Stadium: Joan of Arc Turf Field

October 18, 2014	Toronto Croatia	2–1	Kingston FC	Mississauga, Ontario
19:00	Brown 14'; Živković 89'	Report	Zupo 56'	Stadium: Hershey Centre

==== CSL Championship ====
October 26, 2014	York Region Shooters	1–1 (a.e.t.) (5–4 p)	Toronto Croatia	Toronto, Ontario
16:15	West 110'	Report	Brown 116'	Stadium: Esther Shiner Stadium; Attendance: 400; Referee: Marco Jaramillo
	Penalties
	Desmond Humphrey (penalty scored); Babjide Fatoba (penalty scored); Mackie (penalty scored); Herron (penalty scored); Edwards (penalty scored)		Menalo (penalty scored); Fitzwilliams (penalty scored); Velastegui (penalty scored); Živković (penalty missed); Daniel Niksic (penalty scored)

== Second division ==
Canadian Soccer League Second Division
- Season: 2014
- Champions: Kingston FC B (Second Division regular season); Kingston FC B (Second Division playoffs)
- Matches: 72
- Goals: 341 (4.74 per match)
- Top goalscorer: Mademba Ba (31)

=== Standings ===
Pos	Team	Pld	W	D	L	GF	GA	GD	Pts	Qualification
1	Kingston FC B (A, C, O)	16	12	3	1	66	14	+52	39	Playoffs
2	Toronto Croatia B (A)	16	8	2	6	46	46	0	26	Playoffs
3	Winstars Shooters (A)	16	7	5	4	42	27	+15	26	Playoffs
4	SC Waterloo B (A)	16	7	5	4	54	28	+26	26	Playoffs
5	Burlington SC B (A)	16	7	3	6	28	43	−15	24	Playoffs
6	Milton SC (A)	16	6	4	6	37	33	+4	22	Playoffs
7	Niagara United B (A)	16	6	3	7	37	28	+9	21	Playoffs
8	Brampton City United B (A)	16	6	0	10	24	40	−16	18	Playoffs
9	Serbian White Eagles B	16	0	1	15	7	82	−75	1	

Updated to match(es) played on October 7, 2013. Source: http://canadiansoccerleague.ca/2014-2nd-division-standings/
Rules for classification: 1) points; 2) goal difference; 3) number of goals scored.
(A) Advance to a further round; (C) Champions; (O) Play-off winners

=== Goal scorers ===
Rank	Player	Club	Goals
1	(Senegal) Mademba Ba	Kingston FC B	31
2	(Canada) Nikola Miokovic	SC Waterloo B	18
3	(North Macedonia) Aleksandar Stojanovski	York Region Shooters B	9
4	(Cameroon) Stephane Assengue	Kingston FC B	8
4	Roshane Clarke	Toronto Croatia B	8
4	(Serbia) Aleksandar Stojiljković	SC Waterloo Region B	8
4	Marcelo Tantalo	York Region Shooters B	8
4	Camilo Veloza	Burlington SC B	8
5	(Nigeria) Jinmi Ismail	Kingston FC B	7
5	(Canada) Derek Paterson	Niagara United B	7

=== Playoffs ===
==== Quarterfinals ====
October 11, 2014	Kingston FC II	4–1	Brampton City United II	Belleville, Ontario
13:00		Report		Stadium: M.A. Sills Park

October 12, 2014	SC Waterloo Region II	3–1	Burlington SC II	Waterloo, Ontario
13:30		Report		Stadium: Warrior Field

October 12, 2014	Toronto Croatia II	0–2	Niagara United II	Mississauga, Ontario
18:00		Report		Stadium: Hershey Centre

October 12, 2014	York Region Shooters II	1–5	Milton SC	Vaughan, Ontario
20:30		Report		Stadium: St. Joan of Arc Field Stadium

==== Semifinals ====
October 19, 2014	SC Waterloo Region II	4–2 (a.e.t.)	Milton SC	Waterloo, Ontario
	Zoran Kukic 27'; Nikola Miokovic 75',,	Report	Smajić 23', 86'	Stadium: RIM Park

October 19, 2014	Kingston FC II	5–1	Niagara United II	Kingston, Ontario
	Assengue 9'; Corey Faughnan, Simon Schmitke; Mademba Ba	Report	Derek Paterson	Stadium: Queen’s West Field

=== Finals ===
October 26, 2014	Kingston FC II	2–0	SC Waterloo Region II	Toronto, Ontario
13:00	Simon Schmitke 19'; Mademba Ba 55'	Report		Stadium: Esther Shiner Stadium

== CSL Executive Committee and Staff ==
The 2014 CSL Executive Committee.

Position	Name	Nationality
Chairman:	Vincent Ursini	(Canada) Canadian
Director of Media and PR:	Stan Adamson	(England) English
League Administrator:	Pino Jazbec	(Canada) Canadian
Director of Officials:	Tony Camacho	(Portugal) Portuguese
Director for Youth:	Phil Ionadi	(Canada) Canadian

== Individual awards ==
The annual CSL awards ceremony was held on October 25, 2014 in North York, Toronto. After winning the CSL Golden Boot London City's Marin Vučemilović-Grgić received his second MVP award. Burlington SC received the Defender and Goalkeeper of the Year with former Serbian football veterans Vladimir Vujasinović and Nikola Stanojevic chosen as its recipients. Stanojevic was co-recipient with Josip Keran, a former Druga HNL player with Toronto Croatia. Aleksandar Stojiljković, former Serbian SuperLiga player was chosen as the Rookie of the Year.

After making the transition to head coach, and leading York Region Shooters to an undefeated season Darryl Gomez was voted the Coach of the Year. The league's Director for Youth Phil Ionadi was given the Harry Paul Gauss award. Marco Jaramilio was selected by the CSL Referee Committee as the Referee of the Year, and Kingston FC were recognized for their solid discipline on the field of play with the Fair Play and Respect award.

Award	Player (Club)
CSL Most Valuable Player	Marin Vučemilović-Grgić (London City)
CSL Golden Boot	Marin Vučemilović-Grgić (London City)
CSL Goalkeeper of the Year Award	Vladimir Vujasinović (Burlington SC)
CSL Defender of the Year Award	Josip Keran (Toronto Croatia); Nikola Stanojevic (Burlington SC)
CSL Rookie of the Year Award	Aleksandar Stojiljković (SC Waterloo)
CSL Coach of the Year Award	Darryl Gomez (York Region Shooters)
Harry Paul Gauss Award	Phil Ionadi (CSL Director for Youth)
CSL Referee of the Year Award	Marco Jaramillo
CSL Fair Play Award	Kingston FC
