= Pero Menalo =

Croatian footballer

Personal information
- Date of birth: 10 March 1989 (age 37)
- Place of birth: Čapljina, SR Bosnia, SFR Yugoslavia
- Position: Midfielder

Senior career*
Years	Team	Apps	(Gls)
2010–2011	Čapljina		
2011–2012	GOŠK Gabela	3	(0)
2012–2013	HNK Visici		
2013–2014	Čapljina	14	(5)
2014	Milton SC		
2014–2015	Toronto Croatia		
2018–2019	CSC Mississauga		
2019	Toronto Croatia		
- * Club domestic league appearances and goals

Pero Menalo (born March 10, 1989) is a Croatian former footballer who played as a midfielder. He is currently the director of sports for HNK Čapljina.

== Club career ==
=== Bosnia ===
Menalo had a trial session with Zrinjski Mostar in the summer of 2010. He would play in the First League of the Federation of Bosnia and Herzegovina with HNK Čapljina for the 2010–11 season. The following season, he would play in the country's top tier, the Premier League of Bosnia and Herzegovina with GOSK Gabela. He would make his debut for the club on March 11, 2012, against Slavija Sarajevo. In total, he would appear in 3 matches.

After his brief stint in the top tier, he would play with HNK Visici in the Second League of the Federation of Bosnia and Herzegovina. In 2013, he returned to the second tier with his former club Čapljina.

=== Canada ===
In the summer of 2014, he played abroad in the Canadian Soccer League initially with Milton SC. He was transferred to league rivals Toronto Croatia before the roster freeze on September 1, 2014. In his debut season with Toronto, he finished as the club's top goal scorer with 7 goals and secured a postseason berth by finishing second in the league's first division. In the opening round of the playoffs, he contributed a goal against SC Waterloo Region, which helped the Croats advance to the next round. He would appear in the CSL Championship final against York Region Shooters, where Toronto was defeated in a penalty shootout.

Menalo would re-sign with Toronto for the 2015 season. He assisted the Croats in securing a playoff spot by finishing as runners-up in the league's top division. He would make his second championship final appearance against Waterloo, where Toronto successfully secured the title.

In 2018, he would sign with the expansion franchise CSC Mississauga. He returned to Mississauga for the 2019 season. Menalo would assist Mississauga in securing a playoff berth by finishing seventh in the division. Mississauga would be eliminated from the playoff competition in the opening round by Scarborough SC.

In the summer of 2019, he made a brief return to Toronto Croatia for the 2019 Croatian World Club Championship and was featured in the tournament final against SC Croat San Pedro but lost the series.

== Managerial career ==
Menalo was appointed director of sports at his former club, HNK Čapljina, in 2022. In the 2025–26 season, Čapljina secured promotion to the First League of the Federation of Bosnia and Herzegovina by winning their division in the Second League of the Federation of Bosnia and Herzegovina.

== Personal life ==
He is the brother of Luka Menalo, who is also a footballer.

== Honours ==
Toronto Croatia

- CSL Championship: 2015
- CSL Championship runner-up: 2014
