= Shawn Brown (soccer) =

Jamaican footballer (born 1987)

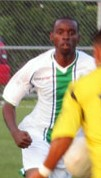
- Brown with Mississauga Eagles in 2011

Personal information
- Date of birth: 27 February 1987 (age 39)
- Place of birth: Jamaica
- Positions: Midfielder; defender

Senior career*
Years	Team	Apps	(Gls)
2010	Serbian White Eagles		
2011	Mississauga Eagles		
2012–2014	SC Waterloo Region		
2014	Travnik	1	(0)
2014	→ Toronto Croatia (loan)		
2015	Toronto Croatia		
2016	York Region Shooters		
2016	North Mississauga SC	13	(2)
2017–2018	Croatia AC (indoor)		
2017–2021	Master's FA	36	(4)
2018–2019	Mississauga MetroStars (indoor)	14	(1)
- * Club domestic league appearances and goals

Shawn Brown (born February 27, 1987) is a Jamaican-born former soccer player who played as a midfielder and defender.

== Career ==
=== Early career ===
Brown began playing with the Toronto-based Serbian White Eagles in the interprovincial Canadian Soccer League in 2010. After a single season with the Serbs, he signed with the expansion franchise Mississauga Eagles. He would record his first goal for the club on June 17, 2011, against London City. The Eagles would successfully secure a postseason berth by finishing seventh in the First Division. Brown would feature in the opening round of the playoffs, where Mississauga was eliminated by Toronto Croatia.

In 2012, he would sign with the newly promoted SC Waterloo Region. The club narrowly failed to clinch a playoff berth after finishing ninth in the division with a single-point difference. He re-signed with Waterloo for the 2013 season. The club would secure a postseason berth by finishing fifth in the First Division. He participated in the CSL Championship final where Waterloo defeated divisional champions Kingston FC for the title. After the conclusion of the Bosnian football season, he returned to Waterloo for the summer of 2014 but would be loaned out to Toronto Croatia for the majority of the season.

=== NK Travnik ===
In the winter of 2014, he played abroad in the Premier League of Bosnia and Herzegovina with NK Travnik. He made his debut for Travnik on March 15, 2014, against Leotar Trebinje.

=== Toronto Croatia ===
Following his return to Waterloo for the 2014 season, he was loaned out to league rivals Toronto Croatia. He assisted the Croats in securing a playoff berth by finishing as runner-up in the First Division. In the second round of the postseason, he contributed a goal against Kingston, which advanced Toronto to the championship finals. He was featured in the championship final against York Region Shooters, where he recorded a goal for Croatia but was defeated in a penalty shootout.

For the 2015 season, he would permanently sign with Toronto Croatia. Once again, he assisted the Croats in clinching a playoff berth by finishing second in the standings. In the preliminary round of the postseason, he recorded a goal against Milton SC, which assisted Croatia in advancing to the next round. For the third time in his career, he participated in the championship final against his former team Waterloo, where Toronto successfully claimed the title.

=== Later career ===
In 2016, he split the season by playing with both York Region Shooters and North Mississauga SC. In his debut season with North Mississauga, he appeared in 13 matches and recorded 2 goals. He was also selected to the League1 Ontario West All-Star team, where he recorded a goal in the All-Star Game.

From 2017 to 2021, he played with Master's FA where he appeared in 36 regular season matches, scoring 4 goals, and 6 playoff matches. In 2019, he helped Master's FA win the League1 championship after defeating FC London. He would feature in the country's national cup tournament against York United FC in the 2021 Canadian Championship.

=== Indoor career ===
In the winter of 2017, he played indoor soccer with Croatia AC in the Arena Premier League. The following indoor season, he signed with expansion side Mississauga MetroStars of the Major Arena Soccer League. He recorded his first for the club on March 17, 2019, against Utica City FC. In total, he would appear in 14 matches and record 1 goal.

== Honours ==
SC Waterloo Region

- CSL Championship: 2013

Toronto Croatia

- CSL Championship: 2015
- CSL Championship runner-up: 2014

York Region Shooters

- Canadian Soccer League First Division: 2016
