= Jure Glavina =

Bosnian footballer

Personal information
- Date of birth: 4 January 1989 (age 37)
- Place of birth: Široki Brijeg, SFR Yugoslavia
- Position: Midfielder

Youth career
- Široki Brijeg

Senior career*
Years	Team	Apps	(Gls)
2008–2011	Široki Brijeg	18	(2)
2008–2009	→Čapljina (loan)	2	(2)
2011–2013	Branitelj	14	(1)
2013–2014	Zmaj Makarska	12	(1)
2014–2015	NK Sloga Ljubuški		
2015	Grude		
2015	Toronto Croatia	15	(14)
2016	SV Drensteinfurt		
2016–2017	Posušje		
2017	SC Waterloo Region	3	(3)
2017–2022	Posušje	28	(3)
2022–	NK Mračaj Runović	42	(14)
- * Club domestic league appearances and goals

Jure Glavina (born January 4, 1989) is a Bosnian footballer who plays as a midfielder for the Croatian side NK Mračaj Runović.

== Career ==
=== Early career ===
Glavina played at the youth level with NK Široki Brijeg. He received his first professional experience in 2008 when he was loaned to HNK Čapljina in the First League of the Federation of Bosnia and Herzegovina. After a season in the second tier, he returned to his parent club and show action in the Premier League of Bosnia and Herzegovina. In his debut season in the top flight, he appeared in 10 matches and recorded a goal. He was also featured in the 2010–11 UEFA Europa League against NK Olimpija Ljubljana. In 2011, after two seasons in the Premier League, he returned to the Bosnian second division to sign with HNK Branitelj and helped the club reach the quarterfinals in the 2011–12 Bosnia and Herzegovina Football Cup.

He played abroad in 2013 in the Croatian Treća HNL with Zmaj Makarska. After a season in the third tier in Croatia he returned to Bosnia to play in the Second League of the Federation of Bosnia and Herzegovina with NK Sloga Ljubuški. In the winter of 2015, he was transferred to league rivals HNK Grude.

=== Canada ===
Following a short stint with Grude, he went abroad for the second time in the summer of 2015 to play in the Canadian Soccer League with Toronto Croatia. In his debut season in Canada, he helped the club secure a playoff berth by finishing second in the First Division. He played in 15 matches and recorded 14 goals throughout the campaign. In the opening round of the postseason, he contributed a hattrick against Milton SC which advanced the Croats to the next round. Toronto would successfully reach the CSL Championship final where the club defeated SC Waterloo Region.

=== Germany ===
He returned to Europe in 2016 to play with German side SV Drensteinfurt. Glavina made his debut for Drensteinfurt on June 3, 2016, against TuS Wiescherhöfen where he recorded two goals. For the remainder of the 2016 season, he returned to his native country to sign with HŠK Posušje. After a season with Posusje, he departed from the club with the original intention of returning to Toronto Croatia. He would instead play with league rivals Waterloo Region and featured in the preliminary round of the playoffs against the Serbian White Eagles.

=== HŠK Posušje ===
In 2017, he returned to his former club Posušje after being signed during the winter transfer market. In his return season, he helped the club win the South Division title in the Bosnian third trier. In the summer of 2019, he made a brief return to Toronto Croatia for the 2019 Croatian World Club Championship and was featured in the tournament final against SC Croat San Pedro but lost the series. He also finished as the tournament's top goal scorer. Posušje secured their second divisional title in the 2019/2020 season which clinched promotion to the First League. He also finished as the top goal scorer in the league with 24 goals. Glavina re-signed with the club the following season and helped the club secure promotion to the Premier League by winning the league title. He remained with Posušje in their initial run in the Premier League but departed in the second half of the season to sign with Croatian side NK Mračaj Runović.

== Personal life ==
In 2019, he married his girlfriend Slava Sesar. His father Vlado Glavina was also a footballer.

== Honors ==
HŠK Posušje

- First League of the Federation of Bosnia and Herzegovina: 2020–21
- Second League of the Federation of Bosnia and Herzegovina: 2017–18 (south), 2019–20 (south)

Toronto Croatia

- CSL Championship: 2015
