= 2009–10 Football Conference =

Football Conference
- Season: 2009–10

The 2009–10 Football Conference season was the sixth season with the Football Conference consisting of three divisions, and the thirty-first season overall. The Conference covers the top two levels of Non-League football in England. The Conference Premier was the fifth highest level of the overall pyramid, while the Conference North and Conference South existed at the sixth level. The top team (Stevenage Borough) and the winner of the play-off (Oxford United) of the National division were promoted to Football League Two. The bottom four were scheduled to be relegated to the North or South divisions, but in the event two teams (Salisbury City and Chester City) were expelled and only the bottom two clubs (Ebbsfleet United and Grays Athletic) were relegated with them. The champions of the North and South divisions (Southport and Newport County respectively) were promoted to the National division, alongside the play-off winners from each division (Fleetwood Town and Bath City). The bottom three in each of the North and South divisions were relegated to the premier divisions of the Northern Premier League, Isthmian League or Southern League. For sponsorship reasons, the Conference Premier was frequently referred to as the Blue Square Premier.

== Conference Premier ==
A total of 24 teams contested the division, including 18 sides from last season, two relegated from the Football League Two, two promoted from the Conference North and two promoted from the Conference South.

=== Promotion and relegation ===
Teams promoted from 2008–09 Conference North

- Tamworth
- Gateshead

Teams promoted from 2008–09 Conference South

- AFC Wimbledon
- Hayes & Yeading United

Teams relegated from 2008–09 League Two

- Chester City
- Luton Town

Luton Town became the first team to drop from the Football League Championship to the Conference in successive seasons and in the process ended an 89-year stay in the Football League. Their matches against eventual playoff winners Oxford United made them the first clubs to face each other in all the top five tiers of English football.

On 26 February 2010, Chester City were expelled from the Conference for numerous rule breaches. Since no appeal was forthcoming, their results were expunged on 8 March 2010.

=== League table ===
Conference Premier
- Season: 2009–10
- Champions: Stevenage Borough (2nd Football Conference title)
- Promoted to League Two: Stevenage Borough, Oxford United
- Relegated to Conference South: Ebbsfleet United
- Relegated to Southern Football League Premier Division: Salisbury City
- Relegated to Isthmian League Division One North: Grays Athletic
- Promoted for the next season: Southpor, Fleetwood Town, Newport County, Bath City
- Matches: 506
- Goals: 1,293 (2.56 per match)
- Top goalscorer: Richard Brodie (York City), 26
- Biggest home win: Rushden & Diamonds – Gateshead 8–0 (13 March 2010), Luton Town – Hayes & Yeading United 8–0 (27 March 2010)
- Biggest away win: Eastbourne Borough – Stevenage Borough 0–6 (2 March 2010)
- Highest scoring: Luton Town – Histon 6–3, Rushden & Diamonds – Grays Athletic 5–4
- Longest winning run: ?
- Longest unbeaten run: ?
- Longest losing run: ?
- Average attendance: 2,045 (+15% compared with the previous season)

Pos	Team	Pld	W	D	L	GF	GA	GD	Pts	Promotion, qualification or relegation
1	Stevenage Borough (C, P)	44	30	9	5	79	24	+55	99	Promotion to Football League Two
2	Luton Town	44	26	10	8	84	40	+44	88	Qualification for the Conference Premier play-offs
3	Oxford United (O, P)	44	25	11	8	64	31	+33	86	Qualification for the Conference Premier play-offs
4	Rushden & Diamonds	44	22	13	9	77	39	+38	79	Qualification for the Conference Premier play-offs
5	York City	44	22	12	10	62	35	+27	78	Qualification for the Conference Premier play-offs
6	Kettering Town	44	18	12	14	51	41	+10	66	
7	Crawley Town	44	19	9	16	50	57	−7	66	
8	AFC Wimbledon	44	18	10	16	61	47	+14	64	
9	Mansfield Town	44	17	11	16	69	60	+9	62	
10	Cambridge United	44	15	14	15	65	53	+12	59	
11	Wrexham	44	15	13	16	45	39	+6	58	
12	Salisbury City (R)	44	21	5	18	58	63	−5	58 (Note: Salisbury City were deducted 10 points for entering administration, and were later demoted to the Southern League at the end of the season for failing to come out of it.)	Demoted to the Southern League Premier Division
13	Kidderminster Harriers	44	15	12	17	57	52	+5	57	
14	Altrincham	44	13	15	16	53	51	+2	54	
15	Barrow	44	13	13	18	50	67	−17	52	
16	Tamworth	44	11	16	17	42	52	−10	49	
17	Hayes & Yeading United	44	12	12	20	59	85	−26	48	
18	Histon	44	11	13	20	44	67	−23	46	
19	Eastbourne Borough	44	11	13	20	42	72	−30	46	
20	Gateshead	44	13	7	24	46	69	−23	45 (Note: Gateshead were deducted one point for failing to fulfil a fixture.)	
21	Forest Green Rovers (Note: Forest Green Rovers were reprieved from relegation.)	44	12	9	23	50	76	−26	45	
22	Ebbsfleet United (R)	44	12	8	24	50	82	−32	44	Relegation to Conference South
23	Grays Athletic (R)	44	5	13	26	35	91	−56	26 (Note: Grays Athletic were docked two points for fielding ineligible players. Grays were relegated from the Conference Premier but declined to join the Conference South for financial reasons. They later applied to join the Isthmian League, and were accepted into the Isthmian League Division One North for 2010–11.)	Relegation to the Isthmian League Division One North
24	Chester City (Note: Chester City were deducted 25 points for entering administration and insolvency, and were later expelled on 26 February 2010, with their record (P28 W5 D7 L16 GF23 GA42 Pts−3) being expunged on 8 March 2010. They were initially expelled to the North West Counties League, but on appeal were admitted to the Northern Premier League Division One North as Chester F.C.)	0	0	0	0	0	0	0	0	Club expelled and folded

Source: Football Conference
Rules for classification: 1) points; 2) goal difference; 3) number of goals scored.
(C) Champions; (O) Play-off winners; (P) Promoted; (R) Relegated

=== Play-offs ===
Semifinals
5	York City	1	1	2
2	Luton Town	0	0	0
4	Rushden & Diamonds	1	0	1
3	Oxford United	1	2	3

Final at Wembley
5	York City	1
3	Oxford United	3

==== Semifinals ====
29 April 2010
19:45
1st Leg

York City	1–0	Luton Town
Brodie 90'	Report

Bootham Crescent, York
Attendance: 6,204
Referee: B Malone
3 May 2010
2nd Leg

Luton Town	0–1	York City
	Report	Carruthers 47'

Kenilworth Road, Luton
Attendance: 9,781
Referee: R Lewis

York City won 2–0 on Aggregate.

29 April 2010
1st Leg

Rushden & Diamonds	1–1	Oxford United
Byrne 51'	Report	Constable 29'

Nene Park, Irthlingborough
Attendance: 4,535
Referee: D Coote
3 May 2010
2nd Leg

Oxford United	2–0	Rushden & Diamonds
Green 53'; Constable 57'	Report

Kassam Stadium, Oxford
Attendance: 11,963
Referee: Mark Brown

Oxford United won 3–1 on Aggregate.

==== Play-Off Final ====
16 May 2010
17:00

Oxford United	3–1	York City
Green 15'; Constable 20'; Potter 90'		Clarke 42' (o.g.)

Wembley Stadium, London
Attendance: 42,669
Referee: Michael Naylor

=== Stadia and locations ===
Locations of the Conference Premier 2009–10 teams

Team	Stadium	Capacity
Wrexham	Racecourse Ground	15,550
Oxford United	Kassam Stadium	12,500
Gateshead	Gateshead International Stadium	11,800
Luton Town	Kenilworth Road	10,226
Mansfield Town	Field Mill	10,000
Cambridge United	Abbey Stadium	9,617
York City	Bootham Crescent	9,196
Stevenage Borough	The Lamex Stadium	7,100
Hayes & Yeading United	Church Road	6,500
Rushden & Diamonds	Nene Park	6,441
Kidderminster Harriers	Aggborough	6,238
Kettering Town	Rockingham Road	6,170
Altrincham	Moss Lane	6,085
Chester	Deva Stadium	5,328
Forest Green Rovers	The New Lawn	5,147
Ebbsfleet United	Stonebridge Road	5,011
Crawley Town	Broadfield Stadium	4,996
AFC Wimbledon	Kingsmeadow	4,720
Barrow	Holker Street	4,256
Eastbourne Borough	Priory Lane	4,134
Grays Athletic	New Recreation Ground	4,100
Tamworth	The Lamb Ground	4,000
Histon	Bridge Road	3,800
Salisbury City	Raymond McEnhill Stadium	3,500

=== Results ===
Home \ Away	WIM	ALT	BRW	CAM	CHR	CRA	EAB	EBB	FGR	GAT	GRY	H&Y	HIS	KET	KID	LUT	MAN	OXF	R&D	SAL	STB	TAM	WRE	YOR
AFC Wimbledon		1–1	0–2	0–0		1–1	2–0	3–0	2–0	2–0	0–2	5–0	4–0	1–2	0–1	1–1	2–0	0–1	0–1	4–0	0–3	0–1	2–2	0–1
Altrincham	0–1		0–1	0–2		0–0	3–0	1–1	2–2	3–2	1–1	3–2	2–1	2–0	3–2	0–1	1–2	0–1	2–2	5–0	0–1	0–0	1–3	0–0
Barrow	2–2	0–3		0–1		4–1	3–2	2–0	1–1	3–3	2–2	1–1	0–0	0–2	1–0	0–1	3–1	1–1	1–6	0–1	0–0	1–0	2–1	0–0
Cambridge United	2–2	0–0	0–2			0–1	0–1	4–0	7–0	3–0	3–0	4–1	2–1	0–2	2–0	3–4	3–2	1–1	2–2	3–1	1–3	2–0	2–0	0–1
Chester																								
Crawley Town	2–1	1–0	0–1	1–0			2–2	2–1	3–1	1–4	1–1	1–0	2–0	2–1	2–2	2–1	0–2	1–2	2–1	2–0	0–3	2–0	1–0	3–1
Eastbourne Borough	1–0	2–2	2–1	2–2		0–2		1–2	1–0	2–1	2–2	3–1	1–1	0–1	0–0	0–1	1–2	1–0	1–1	0–1	0–6	1–1	2–1	3–1
Ebbsfleet United	2–2	1–2	1–4	1–3		0–0	3–2		4–3	2–0	2–1	1–2	0–1	1–2	0–0	1–6	2–1	0–2	0–0	1–2	2–1	0–1	0–1	1–0
Forest Green Rovers	2–5	4–3	1–0	1–1		1–0	1–1	0–0		1–0	2–1	0–0	2–0	1–2	1–1	0–1	1–4	0–1	1–0	3–1	0–1	3–4	0–2	2–1
Gateshead	1–0	1–0	2–1	2–0		2–1	3–0	1–3	3–1		3–0	0–0	0–3	0–2	0–2	0–1	1–3	0–1	0–0	2–1	0–1	1–1	1–0	1–2
Grays Athletic	2–4	0–3	3–3	2–0		2–3	1–0	0–3	2–1	0–0		0–0	0–1	0–0	1–3	0–2	1–1	0–4	0–3	0–2	1–2	1–0	0–2	0–4
Hayes & Yeading United	1–0	1–2	1–1	3–0		2–1	1–1	4–2	2–3	3–2	4–0		0–2	1–2	2–2	2–3	1–1	2–1	1–6	3–4	1–1	2–2	0–1	1–1
Histon	1–3	0–0	2–2	1–1		0–1	2–0	1–0	5–2	0–0	0–0	3–3		1–0	1–1	0–2	0–5	3–4	0–1	2–0	0–2	1–0	0–0	1–1
Kettering Town	1–2	2–0	2–1	0–1		1–1	4–0	3–0	0–2	4–0	2–0	0–1	1–1		0–2	0–0	2–2	1–1	0–3	1–2	1–1	0–0	2–2	0–1
Kidderminster Harriers	0–1	3–0	1–2	1–0		1–0	0–2	2–2	2–1	3–2	4–1	1–0	3–0	0–1		1–2	3–1	3–1	1–1	0–1	0–2	0–0	2–0	0–1
Luton Town	1–2	0–0	1–0	2–2		3–0	4–1	2–3	2–1	2–1	6–0	8–0	6–3	0–1	3–1		4–1	2–1	0–2	4–0	0–1	2–1	1–0	1–1
Mansfield Town	0–1	1–1	4–1	2–1		4–0	1–1	3–0	1–0	0–2	0–0	3–1	1–1	0–0	3–3	0–0		2–1	3–2	4–2	2–3	0–0	0–1	0–1
Oxford United	2–0	1–0	1–0	0–0		3–1	4–0	4–2	0–0	2–1	5–0	1–2	2–0	1–1	0–0	2–0	2–0		1–0	1–0	2–1	0–1	1–0	2–1
Rushden & Diamonds	0–1	0–1	4–1	1–1		1–1	2–0	2–0	4–2	8–0	5–4	2–1	2–1	0–0	2–1	1–1	1–0	1–1		0–2	1–0	3–2	0–0	0–1
Salisbury City	0–2	4–1	3–0	2–1		2–2	1–1	3–1	1–3	0–1	2–0	3–1	3–0	2–0	1–0	1–1	0–1	1–1	1–3		0–1	1–0	1–1	1–0
Stevenage Borough	0–0	1–1	4–0	4–1		2–0	2–0	3–0	2–0	5–3	1–1	4–0	1–0	2–0	2–0	0–1	3–1	1–0	2–1	3–1		1–1	0–0	1–0
Tamworth	2–2	0–2	3–0	0–0		0–1	1–1	3–4	0–0	1–0	2–1	0–2	1–3	1–3	2–1	1–1	2–4	0–0	0–1	2–0	1–0		2–1	2–3
Wrexham	1–0	1–1	0–0	2–2		2–0	3–0	1–1	1–0	0–0	2–1	0–2	3–0	1–2	2–2	3–0	2–1	0–1	0–1	1–2	0–1	0–0		1–0
York City	5–0	2–1	3–0	2–2		2–0	0–1	1–0	2–0	1–0	1–1	4–1	3–1	2–0	3–2	0–0	3–0	1–1	0–0	1–2	1–1	1–1	2–1	

Updated to match(es) played on 24 April 2010. Source: Football Conference
Legend: Blue = home team win; Yellow = draw; Red = away team win.

=== Season statistics ===
==== Top scorers ====
Updated to games played on 24 April.

Pos	Player	Team	Goals
1	(England) Richard Brodie	York City	26
1	(England) Matt Tubbs	Salisbury City	26
3	(England) Tom Craddock	Luton Town	23
4	(England) James Constable	Oxford United	22
5	(England) Danny Kedwell	AFC Wimbledon	21
6	(England) Danny Crow	Cambridge United	19
7	(England) Jake Speight	Mansfield Town	17
8	(Antigua and Barbuda) Moses Ashikodi*	Ebbsfleet United	16
8	(England) Kevin Gallen	Luton Town	16
8	(Brazil) Magno Vieira	Ebbsfleet United	16
11	(Republic of Ireland) Daryl Clare**	Gateshead	15
11	(England) Chris Senior	Altrincham	15
13	(Wales) Rob Duffy	Mansfield Town	14
13	(Nigeria) Yemi Odubade	Stevenage Borough	14
13	(England) Lee Tomlin	Rushden & Diamonds	14

- 1.Moses Ashikodi scored six goals for Kettering Town
- 2.Daryl Clare scored two goals for Mansfield Town

==== Scoring ====
- First goal of the season: Lee Boylan for Stevenage Borough against Tamworth, 12:56 minutes (8 August 2009)
- Last goal of the season: Adam Marriott for Cambridge United against Altrincham, 92:58 minutes (24 April 2010)
- First penalty kick of the season: Lee Boylan (scored) for Stevenage Borough against Tamworth, 12:56 minutes (8 August 2009)
- First own goal of the Season: Jamie Stuart (Rushden & Diamonds) for Salisbury City, 46:42 (8 August 2009)
- First hat-trick of the season: Matt Tubbs for Salisbury City against Hayes & Yeading (31 August 2009)
- Quickest hat-trick: 7 minutes – Mitchell Cole for Stevenage Borough against Eastbourne Borough (2 March 2010)
- Fastest goal scored in a match: 36 seconds – Lewis Taylor for AFC Wimbledon against Forest Green Rovers (10 October 2009)
- Goal scored at the latest point of a game: 90+6 minutes and 51 seconds – Keith Keane for Luton Town against Oxford United (9 February 2010)
- Widest winning margin: 8 goals
  - Rushden & Diamonds 8–0 Gateshead (13 March 2010)
  - Luton Town 8–0 Hayes & Yeading United (27 March 2010)
- Widest away winning margin: 6 goals – Eastbourne Borough 0–6 Stevenage Borough (2 March 2010)
- Most goals in one half: 7 goals – Luton Town 8–0 Hayes & Yeading United (27 March 2010)
- Most goals in one half by a single team: 7 goals – Luton Town 8–0 Hayes & Yeading United (27 March 2010)
- Most goals scored by the losing team: 4 goals – Rushden & Diamonds 5–4 Grays Athletic (12 September 2009)
- Most own goals scored in one match: 2 goals – AFC Wimbledon 2–2 Wrexham (30 March 2010)

==== Discipline ====
- First yellow card of the season: Jason Walker for Barrow against Cambridge United, 2 minutes and 57 seconds (8 August 2009)
- First red card of the season: Sean Newton for Barrow against Cambridge United, 52 minutes and 31 seconds (8 August 2009)
- Card given at latest point in a game: Damian Batt (red) at 90+8 minutes and 17 seconds for Oxford United against Tamworth (16 January 2010)

==== Sequences ====
- Longest winning run: 9 games – Luton Town, ended 10 April 2010.
- Longest unbeaten run: 17 games – Stevenage Borough, ended 1 December 2009.
- Longest losing run: 8 games – Grays Athletic, ended 27 February 2010.
- Longest run without winning: 20 games – Grays Athletic, ended 13 April 2010.
- Longest run of successive home wins: 7 games
  - Luton Town – from 9 March 2010 to 17 April 2010.
  - Stevenage Borough – from 1 January 2010 to 3 April 2010.
- Longest run of successive away wins: 8 games – Stevenage Borough, from 24 February 2010 until end of season.

==== Clean sheets ====
- Most clean sheets: 27 – Stevenage Borough.
- Fewest clean sheets: 7 – Eastbourne Borough and Ebbsfleet United.
- Consecutive clean sheets: 6 games without conceding:
  - AFC Wimbledon – from 24 November 2009 to 1 January 2010.
  - Oxford United – from 29 August 2009 to 22 September 2009.
  - Stevenage Borough – from 5 April 2010 until end of season.

=== Monthly awards ===
Month	Manager of the Month		Player of the Month	
Month	Manager	Club	Player	Club
August	(England) Chris Wilder	Oxford United	(England) George Pilkington	Luton Town
September	(England) Chris Wilder	Oxford United	(England) Ryan Clarke	Oxford United
October	(England) David Holdsworth	Mansfield Town	(England) Paul Farman	Gateshead
November	(England) Martin Foyle	York City	(England) Richard Brodie	York City
December	(England) Terry Brown	AFC Wimbledon	(England) Seb Brown	AFC Wimbledon
January	(England) Graham Westley	Stevenage Borough	(Brazil) Magno Vieira	Ebbsfleet United
February	(Scotland) Steve Burr	Kidderminster Harriers	(England) Chris Senior	Altrincham
March	(England) Richard Money	Luton Town	(France) Claude Gnakpa	Luton Town
April	(England) Tommy Widdrington	Salisbury City	(England) Mark Roberts	Stevenage Borough

== Conference North ==
Conference North
- Season: 2009–10
- Champions: Southport
- Promoted: Southport; Fleetwood Town
- Relegated: Northwich Victoria (demoted)

A total of 22 teams contested the division, including 17 sides from last season, one relegated from the Conference Premier and four promoted from the lower leagues.

In April 2009, the Conference decided to demote King's Lynn at the end of the 2008–09 season, because their ground did not meet Conference standards. Farsley Celtic resigned from the league on 8 March 2010 and their playing record was expunged on 12 March. Both Harrogate Town and Vauxhall Motors were reprieved from relegation following Farsley Celtic's withdrawal from the league, Chester's expulsion from the Conference Premier and Northwich Victoria's demotion to the Northern Premier League under financial rules.

=== Promotion and relegation ===
Teams promoted from 2008–09 Northern Premier League Premier Division

- Eastwood Town
- Ilkeston Town

Teams promoted from 2008–09 Southern League Premier Division

- Corby Town
- Gloucester City

Teams relegated from 2008–09 Conference Premier

- Northwich Victoria

=== League table ===
Pos	Team	Pld	W	D	L	GF	GA	GD	Pts	Promotion, qualification or relegation
1	Southport (C, P)	40	25	11	4	91	45	+46	86	Promotion to Conference Premier
2	Fleetwood Town (O, P)	40	26	7	7	86	44	+42	85	Qualification for the Conference North play-offs
3	Alfreton Town	40	21	11	8	77	45	+32	74	Qualification for the Conference North play-offs
4	Workington	40	20	10	10	46	37	+9	70	Qualification for the Conference North play-offs
5	Droylsden	40	18	10	12	82	62	+20	64	Qualification for the Conference North play-offs
6	Corby Town	40	18	9	13	73	62	+11	63	
7	Hinckley United	40	16	14	10	60	52	+8	62	
8	Ilkeston Town	40	16	13	11	53	45	+8	61	
9	Stalybridge Celtic	40	16	7	17	71	64	+7	55	
10	Eastwood Town	40	15	9	16	50	55	−5	54	
11	AFC Telford United	40	14	9	17	52	55	−3	51	
12	Northwich Victoria (R)	40	15	13	12	62	55	+7	48 (Note: Northwich Victoria were originally expelled from the Football Conference for going into administration, but they successfully appealed, and were allowed to play in the Conference North starting with a 10 point deduction.)	Demoted to the Northern Premier League Premier Division (Note: Northwich Victoria were demoted to the Northern Premier League after the end of the season due to financial issues.)
13	Blyth Spartans	40	13	9	18	67	72	−5	48	
14	Gainsborough Trinity	40	12	11	17	50	57	−7	47	
15	Hyde United	40	11	12	17	45	72	−27	45	
16	Stafford Rangers	40	10	14	16	59	70	−11	44	
17	Solihull Moors	40	11	9	20	47	58	−11	42	
18	Gloucester City	40	12	6	22	47	59	−12	42	
19	Redditch United	40	10	8	22	49	83	−34	38	
20	Vauxhall Motors	40	7	14	19	45	81	−36	35	Reprived from relegation (Note: Vauxhall Motors and Harrogate Town were reprieved from relegation due to the folding of Chester City and the demotion of Northwich Victoria.)
21	Harrogate Town	40	8	6	26	41	80	−39	30	Reprived from relegation
22	Farsley Celtic	0	0	0	0	0	0	0	0	Club resigned and folded (Note: Farsley Celtic resigned on 8 March 2010 and their record (P30 W14 D2 L14 GF48 GA55 Pts34) was expunged on 12 March 2010. Prior to this Farsley were in administration and, like Northwich Victoria, had been allowed to play in the Conference North starting with a 10 point deduction.)

Source: Football Conference
Rules for classification: 1) points; 2) goal difference; 3) number of goals scored.
(C) Champions; (O) Play-off winners; (P) Promoted; (R) Relegated

=== Play-offs ===
Semifinals
5	Droylsden	2	1(3)	3
2	Fleetwood Town	0	3(4)	3
4	Workington	0	1	1
3	Alfreton Town	1	3	4

Final
2	Fleetwood Town	2
3	Alfreton Town	1

==== Semifinals ====
28 April 2010
1st Leg

Droylsden	2–0	Fleetwood Town
Meechan 71'; Gray 81'	Report

Butcher's Arms Ground, Droylsden
Attendance: 1,102
2 May 2010
2nd Leg

Fleetwood Town	3–1	Droylsden
Milligan 42'; Seddon 45'; Grand 110'	Report	Roche 113'
Penalties
Barry (penalty missed); Rogan (penalty scored)	4–3	(penalty missed) Smith; (penalty missed) Brownhill

Highbury Stadium, Fleetwood
Attendance: 2,862
Referee: Jones

Fleetwood Town won 4–3 on penalties after tying 3–3 on Aggregate.

28 April 2010
1st Leg

Workington	0–1	Alfreton Town
	Report	Hearn 54'

Borough Park, Workington
Attendance: 1,483
2 May 2010
2nd Leg

Alfreton Town	3–1	Workington
Ross 37'; Clayton 48', 87'	Report	Arnison 12'

North Street, Alfreton
Attendance: 1,575

Alfreton Town won 4–1 on Aggregate.

==== Play-Off Final ====
9 May 2010

Fleetwood Town	2–1	Alfreton Town
Seddon 10'; Thorpe 82'	Report	Todd 80' (pen.)

Highbury Stadium, Fleetwood
Attendance: 3,592
Referee: S Smith

=== Stadia and locations ===
Locations of the Conference North 2009–10 teams

Team	Stadium	Capacity
Stalybridge Celtic	Bower Fold	6,500
AFC Telford United	New Bucks Head	6,300
Southport	Haig Avenue	6,008
Redditch United	The Valley	5,000
Gloucester City	The Corinium Stadium	4,500
Northwich Victoria	Victoria Stadium	4,500
Blyth Spartans	Croft Park	4,450
Hinckley United	De Montfort Park	4,329
Gainsborough Trinity	The Northolme	4,304
Stafford Rangers	Marston Road	4,150
Hyde United	Ewen Fields	4,100
Farsley Celtic	Throstle Nest	3,900
Fleetwood Town	Highbury Stadium	3,663
Alfreton Town	North Street	3,600
Ilkeston Town	New Manor Ground	3,500
Harrogate Town	Wetherby Road	3,300
Workington	Borough Park	3,101
Solihull Moors	Damson Park	3,050
Corby Town	Rockingham Triangle	3,000
Droylsden	Butcher's Arms Ground	3,000
Eastwood Town	Coronation Park	2,500
Vauxhall Motors	Rivacre Park	2,500

=== Results ===
Home \ Away	TEL	ALF	BLY	COR	DRO	EAS	FAR	FLE	GAI	GLO	HAR	HIN	HYD	ILK	NOR	RED	SOL	SOU	STA	STL	VAU	WRK
AFC Telford United		2–0	1–1	2–4	1–2	1–1		0–0	2–2	0–1	2–1	2–2	4–0	0–0	1–2	3–0	0–0	0–2	2–1	0–1	5–1	1–0
Alfreton Town	4–0		1–0	1–0	5–0	1–1		1–4	1–0	3–1	3–1	3–2	4–0	2–0	3–2	3–0	3–0	1–1	3–1	3–5	2–2	2–0
Blyth Spartans	4–0	2–0		1–2	2–2	1–3		2–3	2–1	0–3	1–0	6–1	4–3	1–4	0–1	1–0	2–0	0–2	2–2	4–1	3–2	0–0
Corby Town	1–2	1–2	4–2		1–0	1–1		0–2	2–2	3–6	3–0	1–1	2–0	2–2	1–0	2–2	1–2	1–1	3–2	5–1	4–1	0–2
Droylsden	1–5	0–0	2–1	1–2		0–1		2–0	4–1	2–2	5–0	0–0	1–0	2–0	5–1	6–1	5–3	0–3	7–1	3–2	1–1	0–1
Eastwood Town	1–1	2–1	4–2	0–1	2–1			0–1	1–0	0–3	1–0	1–0	2–0	0–3	1–1	3–1	2–1	0–3	0–0	1–3	0–0	1–2
Farsley Celtic																						
Fleetwood Town	3–1	2–2	4–2	4–2	3–0	3–1			2–2	3–1	2–2	3–1	1–1	1–0	0–3	8–0	3–0	4–0	2–1	2–0	4–2	4–0
Gainsborough Trinity	0–1	3–2	2–0	2–0	4–2	1–4		2–0		1–0	1–1	1–1	2–1	0–0	1–4	3–0	0–0	2–4	1–3	1–3	2–0	0–1
Gloucester City	0–1	1–2	3–1	1–2	1–4	1–3		1–2	1–0		0–1	3–5	2–0	0–1	0–1	2–0	1–0	2–2	2–0	1–2	1–0	0–2
Harrogate Town	0–3	0–4	2–5	0–4	2–2	0–1		0–1	2–0	1–1		3–1	2–0	0–1	2–1	3–2	0–1	2–3	1–4	0–4	3–0	1–2
Hinckley United	2–0	2–1	1–1	1–1	1–1	0–0		0–2	2–0	1–0	3–2		1–2	1–0	1–1	5–1	0–3	4–1	3–1	0–0	1–1	1–2
Hyde United	1–1	1–5	0–3	1–3	2–1	1–0		2–1	4–2	1–1	1–0	3–2		1–1	1–1	3–2	1–1	1–1	1–0	2–1	2–2	0–2
Ilkeston Town	2–1	0–0	2–1	3–2	1–0	1–0		0–1	0–0	0–0	3–3	0–1	1–1		1–1	3–2	1–0	3–2	2–3	3–2	4–0	1–3
Northwich Victoria	2–0	1–1	5–1	2–2	2–5	4–4		0–3	0–1	1–0	3–2	0–1	3–1	4–1		0–2	2–0	1–1	2–2	2–1	0–0	2–3
Redditch United	3–0	3–0	2–2	1–0	1–3	1–2		0–0	0–3	4–1	2–0	0–2	0–0	2–2	1–1		1–4	2–2	1–2	1–4	1–1	2–1
Solihull Moors	0–1	1–1	1–1	3–0	1–2	2–1		1–2	0–1	0–1	1–0	2–4	3–0	0–3	1–1	1–2		1–1	1–1	2–2	4–0	1–2
Southport	3–0	1–3	3–2	4–0	3–3	5–1		5–0	0–0	3–2	3–1	1–1	4–1	1–1	2–1	2–0	3–0		4–2	2–1	3–0	2–0
Stafford Rangers	2–0	1–1	1–1	0–2	2–2	3–3		2–2	2–1	1–0	1–0	2–3	1–1	0–1	2–2	0–1	2–3	1–2		1–2	3–1	2–0
Stalybridge Celtic	0–3	0–1	0–1	1–3	2–2	1–0		2–3	3–2	4–1	3–0	0–0	2–4	1–0	1–1	3–0	4–1	0–1	2–2		3–1	2–2
Vauxhall Motors	3–1	1–1	1–1	2–4	1–2	3–2		2–1	2–2	0–0	1–2	1–1	1–0	4–2	1–0	0–5	0–2	1–3	2–2	3–2		1–1
Workington	2–1	0–1	3–1	1–1	0–1	1–0		1–0	1–1	2–0	1–1	0–1	2–2	0–0	0–1	1–0	1–0	0–2	1–1	1–0	1–0	

Updated to match(es) played on 24 April 2010. Source: Football Conference
Legend: Blue = home team win; Yellow = draw; Red = away team win.

=== Monthly awards ===
Month	Manager of the Month		Player of the Month	
Month	Manager	Club	Player	Club
August	(England) Paul Cox	Eastwood Town	(England) Ciaran Kilheeney	Southport
September	(Scotland) Steve Burr	Stalybridge Celtic	(England) Dan Lowson	Ilkeston Town
October	(England) Liam Watson	Southport	(England) Mark Danks	Northwich Victoria
November	(England) Dean Thomas	Hinckley United	(England) Adam Webster	Hinckley United
December	(Scotland) Steve Burr	Stalybridge Celtic	(England) Andy Ducros	Redditch United
January	(England) Darren Edmondson	Workington	(England) Nick Rogan	Fleetwood Town
February	(England) Nicky Law	Alfreton Town	(England) Andy Brown	AFC Telford United
March	(England) Brian Little	Gainsborough Trinity	(England) Adam Warlow	Fleetwood Town

== Conference South ==
Conference South
- Season: 2009–10
- Champions: Newport County
- Promoted: Newport County; Bath City
- Relegated: Weymouth
- Matches: 462

A total of 22 teams contested the division, including 17 sides from last season, three relegated from the Conference Premier and two promoted from the Isthmian League.

Team Bath announced that they were to leave the Football Conference from the end of the 2008–09 season. The club decided to fold, after being informed they could not be promoted to the professional leagues, which also led to them no longer being able to play FA Cup games. Thus Thurrock were reprieved from relegation.

=== Promotion and relegation ===
Teams promoted from 2008–09 Isthmian League Premier Division

- Dover Athletic
- Staines Town

Teams relegated from 2008–09 Conference Premier

- Lewes
- Woking
- Weymouth

=== League table ===
Pos	Team	Pld	W	D	L	GF	GA	GD	Pts	Promotion, qualification or relegation
1	Newport County (C, P)	42	32	7	3	93	26	+67	103	Promotion to Conference Premier
2	Dover Athletic	42	22	9	11	66	47	+19	75	Qualification for the Conference South play-offs
3	Chelmsford City	42	22	9	11	62	48	+14	75	Qualification for the Conference South play-offs
4	Bath City (O, P)	42	20	12	10	66	46	+20	72	Qualification for the Conference South play-offs
5	Woking	42	21	9	12	57	44	+13	72	Qualification for the Conference South play-offs
6	Havant & Waterlooville	42	19	14	9	65	44	+21	71	
7	Braintree Town	42	18	17	7	56	41	+15	71	
8	Staines Town	42	18	13	11	59	40	+19	67	
9	Welling United	42	18	9	15	66	51	+15	63	
10	Thurrock	42	16	13	13	66	60	+6	61	
11	Eastleigh	42	17	9	16	71	66	+5	60	
12	Bromley	42	15	10	17	68	64	+4	55	
13	St Albans City	42	15	10	17	45	55	−10	55	
14	Hampton & Richmond Borough	42	14	9	19	56	66	−10	51	
15	Basingstoke Town	42	13	10	19	49	68	−19	49	
16	Maidenhead United	42	12	12	18	52	59	−7	48	
17	Dorchester Town	42	13	9	20	56	74	−18	48	
18	Bishop's Stortford	42	12	11	19	48	59	−11	47	
19	Lewes	42	9	15	18	49	63	−14	42	
20	Worcester City	42	10	10	22	48	60	−12	40	Reprived from relegation, then transferred to Conference North (Note: Worcester City and Weston-super-Mare were reprieved from relegation due to the demotions of Salisbury City and Grays Athletic from the Conference Premier.)
21	Weston-super-Mare	42	5	8	29	48	93	−45	23	Reprived from relegation
22	Weymouth (R)	42	5	7	30	31	103	−72	22	Relegation to the Southern League Premier Division

Source: Football Conference
Rules for classification: 1) points; 2) goal difference; 3) number of goals scored.
(C) Champions; (O) Play-off winners; (P) Promoted; (R) Relegated

=== Play-offs ===
Semifinals
5	Woking	2	0	2
2	Dover Athletic	1	0	1
4	Bath City	2	1	3
3	Chelmsford City	0	0	0

Final
4	Bath City	1
5	Woking	0

==== Semifinals ====
27 April 2010
19:45 GMT
1st Leg

Woking	2–1	Dover Athletic
Ademola 17'; Wright 40'	Report	Schulz 3'

Kingfield Stadium, Woking
Attendance: 3,080
1 May 2010
15:00 GMT
2nd Leg

Dover Athletic	0–0	Woking
	Report

Crabble Athletic Ground, Dover
Attendance: 2,970

Woking won 2–1 on Aggregate.

27 April 2010
1st Leg

Bath City	2–0	Chelmsford City
Mohamed 60'; Mackie 87'	Report

Twerton Park, Bath
Attendance: 1,425
1 May 2010
2nd Leg

Chelmsford City	0–1	Bath City
		Mohamed 53'

Melbourne Stadium, Chelmsford

Bath City won 3–0 on Aggregate.

==== Play-Off Final ====
9 May 2010
14:00 GMT

Bath City	1–0	Woking
Mohamed 56' (pen.)

Twerton Park, Bath
Attendance: 4,865

=== Stadia and locations ===
Locations of the Conference South 2009–10 teams

Team	Stadium	Capacity
Bath City	Twerton Park	8,800
Dover Athletic	Crabble Stadium	6,500
Weymouth	The Wessex Stadium	6,500
Woking	Kingfield Stadium	6,036
Basingstoke Town	The Camrose	6,000
Havant & Waterlooville	West Leigh Park	5,250
Dorchester Town	Avenue Stadium	5,009
Bromley	Hayes Lane	5,000
Worcester City	St George's Lane	4,749
Newport County	Newport Stadium	4,700
St Albans City	Clarence Park	4,500
Welling United	Park View Road	4,500
Braintree Town	Cressing Road	4,145
Bishop's Stortford	Woodside Park	4,000
Thurrock	Ship Lane	3,500
Weston-super-Mare	Woodspring Stadium	3,500
Chelmsford City	Melbourne Stadium	3,000
Eastleigh	Silverlake Stadium	3,000
Hampton & Richmond	Beveree Stadium	3,000
Lewes	The Dripping Pan	3,000
Maidenhead United	York Road	3,000
Staines Town	Wheatsheaf Park	3,000

=== Results ===
Home \ Away	BAS	BAT	BST	BRA	BRO	CHE	DOR	DOV	EAS	H&R	H&W	LEW	MDH	NPC	SAC	STA	THU	WEL	WSM	WEY	WOK	WRC
Basingstoke Town		1–0	0–2	0–1	2–3	2–1	2–1	1–3	0–1	1–2	1–1	1–1	0–0	1–5	1–1	0–1	0–4	1–1	1–1	2–1	1–2	0–1
Bath City	4–3		2–2	2–4	0–0	1–0	2–0	0–0	0–2	1–3	1–1	1–1	1–0	1–1	0–0	2–0	1–0	2–1	1–0	2–0	5–0	1–1
Bishop's Stortford	0–2	1–5		0–0	3–0	0–1	2–0	0–2	0–1	0–1	1–0	0–0	1–2	0–0	2–0	2–2	0–0	0–4	3–0	0–1	0–3	2–1
Braintree Town	1–2	2–0	2–0		1–1	2–1	2–0	1–2	1–1	1–1	0–2	3–0	2–0	1–2	2–2	2–0	3–1	1–0	1–0	3–2	1–0	0–0
Bromley	2–0	1–2	1–1	1–1		3–3	3–1	2–2	3–0	1–2	0–2	3–0	1–2	2–3	2–0	0–2	2–3	0–1	1–1	4–0	3–1	2–0
Chelmsford City	1–2	4–3	3–0	1–1	1–2		1–0	1–1	2–2	1–0	1–1	2–1	1–1	0–0	2–0	0–1	1–0	3–1	2–2	2–1	0–2	1–0
Dorchester Town	6–1	2–2	2–0	5–0	0–0	0–3		1–3	1–2	2–1	4–3	1–1	4–2	0–0	3–0	2–2	1–0	1–2	4–2	0–0	1–1	1–1
Dover Athletic	2–3	2–1	2–0	0–0	1–0	0–1	4–1		2–1	4–2	4–0	2–0	1–1	1–2	1–1	0–0	1–0	2–0	5–3	2–0	0–2	0–2
Eastleigh	6–0	1–1	1–1	1–2	6–1	3–1	2–0	1–2		0–0	0–1	1–0	0–3	1–4	0–1	0–0	2–8	1–3	3–1	4–0	0–2	4–1
Hampton & Richmond	0–1	3–1	1–3	2–2	0–2	2–1	1–2	1–4	4–1		1–1	1–2	4–0	0–4	3–0	1–4	1–1	2–2	2–1	3–0	0–2	2–2
Havant & Waterlooville	0–2	2–2	2–1	1–1	2–1	5–2	0–1	2–1	2–2	1–1		1–1	1–0	4–0	0–1	1–0	1–1	2–2	6–0	3–1	1–1	3–2
Lewes	0–0	1–2	2–1	2–2	1–0	0–2	5–0	6–2	1–2	1–0	0–3		1–2	0–3	0–0	1–1	1–1	3–1	2–0	1–1	0–2	3–3
Maidenhead United	3–2	1–2	4–0	0–0	4–0	0–2	1–2	0–0	0–3	2–1	0–2	1–1		1–3	0–3	2–1	0–2	2–0	0–0	1–1	1–2	1–1
Newport County	1–0	1–0	1–0	1–0	2–0	4–0	3–0	3–0	5–1	3–1	2–0	2–2	4–1		5–0	1–0	5–0	2–2	2–0	1–1	1–0	1–0
St Albans City	2–0	0–2	2–4	1–1	2–0	0–1	2–1	1–2	2–1	1–2	1–1	1–1	1–0	0–1		1–3	1–0	1–2	2–1	2–1	0–1	2–0
Staines Town	0–1	1–1	2–2	2–1	2–2	0–1	3–0	0–0	1–2	4–0	1–2	2–1	1–1	1–0	4–3		3–0	1–1	3–0	3–1	3–0	0–1
Thurrock	0–0	3–1	2–2	1–2	3–6	1–1	5–2	0–2	3–2	0–2	0–0	3–1	2–2	2–1	0–0	1–2		3–2	2–1	2–1	2–2	2–1
Welling United	1–1	0–2	0–2	0–0	0–2	0–1	1–1	0–1	1–2	2–0	1–0	1–0	3–1	0–2	3–2	3–0	2–2		3–1	7–1	1–2	1–0
Weston-super-Mare	1–1	0–2	1–3	1–2	3–3	1–2	0–2	3–1	2–2	1–1	1–2	3–2	1–4	1–4	2–3	0–1	1–3	1–2		3–0	1–1	3–1
Weymouth	0–6	0–2	2–6	1–1	1–5	1–4	2–0	1–2	0–5	1–0	0–1	3–1	0–5	1–3	0–2	1–2	0–0	0–3	1–2		0–0	2–1
Woking	4–2	1–3	1–0	0–0	2–1	1–2	3–1	2–0	0–0	3–1	2–0	2–0	1–1	0–1	0–1	0–0	0–1	0–5	2–1	4–0		1–0
Worcester City	1–1	0–2	1–1	2–3	1–2	1–2	4–0	1–0	4–1	0–1	0–2	1–2	1–0	1–4	0–0	0–0	1–2	0–1	4–1	3–1	3–2	

Updated to match(es) played on 24 April 2010. Source: Football Conference
Legend: Blue = home team win; Yellow = draw; Red = away team win.

=== Monthly awards ===
Month	Manager of the Month		Player of the Month	
Month	Manager	Club	Player	Club
August	(Scotland) Frank Gray	Basingstoke Town	(Sierra Leone) Manny Williams	Havant & Waterlooville
September	(England) Dean Holdsworth	Newport County	(England) Craig Reid	Newport County
October	(England) Alan Devonshire	Hampton & Richmond Borough	(England) Will Hendry	Maidenhead United
November	(England) Dean Holdsworth	Newport County	(England) Tom Whitnell	Welling United
December	(England) Glenn Pennyfather	Chelmsford City	(England) Charlie Henry	Newport County
January	(England) Steve Cordery	Staines Town	(Republic of Ireland) Sam Foley	Newport County
February	(England) Dean Holdsworth	Newport County	(England) Mitchell Bryant	Basingstoke Town
March	(England) Glenn Pennyfather	Chelmsford City	(Northern Ireland) Lee Clarke	Welling United
