= Saša Ivković =

Emirati footballer (born 1993)

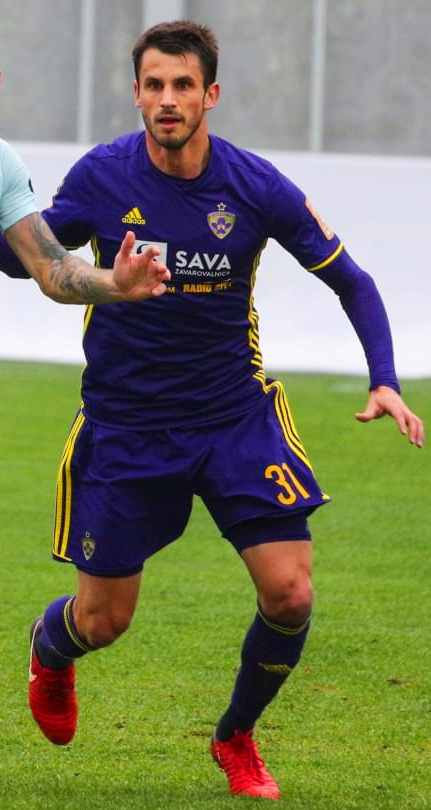
- Ivković with Maribor in 2018

Personal information
- Date of birth: 13 May 1993 (age 33)
- Place of birth: Vukovar, Croatia
- Height: 1.92 m (6 ft 4 in)
- Position: Center-back

Team information
- Current team: Al Wahda
- Number: 31

Youth career
- 2000–2007: Krila Krajine
- 2007–2010: ČSK Čelarevo

Senior career*
Years	Team	Apps	(Gls)
2010–2011	ČSK Čelarevo	13	(1)
2011–2015	Partizan	1	(0)
2011–2013	→ Teleoptik (loan)	61	(3)
2014	→ Teleoptik (loan)	12	(0)
2014	→ OFK Bačka (loan)	13	(0)
2015–2018	Voždovac	67	(2)
2016–2017	→ Ashdod (loan)	2	(0)
2018–2019	Maribor	57	(10)
2019–2024	Baniyas	120	(12)
2024–	Al Wahda	40	(2)

International career^{‡}
2010–2011	Serbia U18	4	(0)
2011–2012	Serbia U19	8	(0)
2025–	United Arab Emirates	9	(2)
- * Club domestic league appearances and goals as of 16 March 2026 ‡ National team caps and goals as of 17 November 2026

Saša Ivković (Serbian Cyrillic: Саша Ивковић; Arabic: ساشا إيفكوفيتش; born 13 May 1993) is a professional footballer who plays for UAE Pro League club Al Wahda as a center-back. Born in Croatia, he represents the United Arab Emirates national team.

== Club career ==
Ivković made his professional debut for Partizan on 7 December 2013 in a league match against Čukarički, replacing Saša Ilić near the end of the match.

== International career ==
As a Serbian citizen by birth and former representative of Serbia’s youth national teams, Ivković was granted Emirati passport in July 2024, making him eligible to represent the United Arab Emirates national team based on residency.

On 21 February 2025, Ivković's request to switch allegiance to the United Arab Emirates was approved by FIFA.

He made his debut in final match of 2026 FIFA World Cup qualifying third round against Kyrgyzstan.

On 4 September 2025, Ivković scored his first international goal in a friendly match against Syria.

== Career statistics ==
=== International ===
Scores and results list United Arab Emirates' goal tally first, score column indicates score after each Ivkovic goal.

List of international goals scored by Saša Ivković
No.	Date	Venue	Opponent	Score	Result	Competition
1	4 September 2025	Zabeel Stadium, Dubai, United Arab Emirates	Syria	1–1	3–1	Friendly
2	17 November 2026	Hazza bin Zayed Stadium, Al Ain, United Arab Emirates	Syria	1–0	4–2	Friendly

== Personal life ==
Although born in Vukovar, he was raised in Bačka Palanka. He is a younger brother of Radovan Ivković.
