= Adnan Smajić =

Bosnian footballer

Personal information
- Date of birth: 31 March 1992 (age 34)
- Place of birth: Sarajevo, SR Bosnia and Herzegovina, SFR Yugoslavia
- Position: Forward

Youth career
- 2009: Slavija Sarajevo

Senior career*
Years	Team	Apps	(Gls)
2011–2012	Slavija Sarajevo	6	(0)
2012–2013	Travnik	7	(0)
2012–2013	Bosna Visoko	10	(0)
2013–2014	Famos Hrasnica		
2014–2017	Milton SC		
- * Club domestic league appearances and goals

Adnan Smajić (born March 31, 1992) is a Bosnian former footballer who played as a forward.

Smajić received his football training at the Slavija Sarajevo's youth system and graduated to the senior team. While playing with Slavija's senior team, he debuted in the Bosnian top-tier league in 2011. He later played with various Bosnian clubs in the country's premier league and secondary leagues. In 2014, he ventured abroad to play with Milton SC in the Canadian Soccer League. Throughout his tenure with Milton, he played in the league's first and second divisions and won a championship title with the reserve team in 2015.

== Club career ==
=== Bosnia ===
Smajić played at the youth level with Slavija Sarajevo.

He joined the senior team in 2011 in the Premier League of Bosnia and Herzegovina. He debuted for Slavija on August 11, 2011, against FK Sarajevo. However, he experienced limited playing time as he received an injury early in the season. In total, he played in 6 matches in his debut season.

The following season, he remained in the Bosnian top tier and secured a deal with NK Travnik. He debuted for Travnik on August 12, 2012, against his former club Sarajevo. His tenure was cut short as he departed Travnik during the January transfer window. Throughout his stint with Travnik, he appeared in 7 matches. For the remainder of the 2012–13 season, he played in the First League of Bosnia and Herzegovina with Bosna Visoko. In 2013, he played for Famos Hrasnica.

=== Canada ===
In 2014, he played abroad in the Canadian Soccer League's second division with the expansion side Milton SC. In his debut season with Milton, he assisted the club in securing a playoff berth and recorded two goals in the semifinal round. Smajić re-joined Milton the following season as they were promoted to the league's first division. In his second season with Milton, he assisted the club to secure a playoff berth by finishing seventh in the division. Milton was defeated in the opening round of the postseason by Toronto Croatia. He also played in the league's second division with the reserve team, where he aided the club in securing a berth in the playoffs. He was featured in the championship final, where he recorded a goal against SC Waterloo Region's reserve team to claim the title.

He re-signed with Milton for another season in 2016, where he was named the team captain. Smajić assisted the club in securing a playoff berth, where they were eliminated in the first round by York Region Shooters. He finished as the team's top goal scorer with 12 goals, which ranked him third in the overall scoring charts. He returned for his third season for Milton in 2017. Milton qualified for the playoffs and was eliminated in the quarterfinals by York Region.

== Honors ==
Milton SC II

- CSL II Championship: 2015
