= Todor Babović =

Montenegrin footballer

Personal information
- Date of birth: 6 May 1996 (age 30)
- Place of birth: Yugoslavia
- Position: Forward

Senior career*
Years	Team	Apps	(Gls)
2015–2016	Žarkovo		
2017–2018	Dinamo Vranje	2	(0)
2018	Cetinje	13	(1)
2019	Milton SC		
2019	SC Waterloo Region		
2021–	Milton SC		
- * Club domestic league appearances and goals as of October 10, 2019

Todor Babović (born May 6, 1996) is a Montenegrin footballer playing with Milton SC.

== Club career ==
Babović played with FK Žarkovo in the Serbian League Belgrade in 2015, and later with FK Vrčin in 2016. In 2017, he played abroad in the Serbian First League with FK Dinamo Vranje. After a season abroad he played in the Montenegrin Second League with FK Cetinje. In 2019, he played abroad for the second time in the Canadian Academy of Soccer League (CASL) with Milton SC. Later throughout the season he played in the Canadian Soccer League with SC Waterloo Region.

In 2021, he returned to play with former team Milton SC in the CASL.
