= Radovan Ivković =

Serbian footballer

Personal information
- Full name: Radovan Ivković
- Date of birth: 26 March 1989 (age 37)
- Place of birth: Virovitica, SR Croatia, SFR Yugoslavia
- Height: 1.89 m (6 ft 2 in)
- Position: Left wing

Team information
- Current team: ČSK Čelarevo

Youth career
- ČSK Čelarevo

Senior career*
Years	Team	Apps	(Gls)
2006–2011	ČSK Čelarevo	28	(12)
2006–2007	→ Krila Krajine (loan)		
2007–2008	→ OFK Futog (loan)		
2008–2010	→ OFK Bačka (loan)	44	(10)
2011	Vupik Vukovar		
2012	BSK Bijelo Brdo		
2012–2018	OFK Bačka	77	(9)
2015	→ Milton SC (loan)	23	(6)
2018	Hajduk 1912	0	(0)
2019-	ČSK Čelarevo		
- * Club domestic league appearances and goals as of 29 August 2018

Radovan Ivković (Serbian Cyrillic: Радован Ивковић; born 26 March 1989) is a Serbian football forward who plays for ČSK Čelarevo.

== Club career ==
Born in Virovitica, Ivković started his career with ČSK Čelarevo. As a young footballer, he spent some period as a loaned player with lower ranked clubs Krila Krajine, OFK Futog and OFK Bačka, where he scored 10 goals on 44 Serbian League Vojvodina matches for 2 seasons. He returned to ČSK Čelarevo for the 2010–11 Serbian League Vojvodina season and during the season he scored 12 goals on 28 league matches. Later he played for Vupik Vukovar and BSK Bijelo Brdo in Croatia, before he signed his second spell with OFK Bačka as a single player. He contributed in winning Serbian League Vojvodina with 8 goals on 25 matches for the 2013–14 season. During 2015, Ivković was loaned to Milton SC, where he scored several goals in the Canadian Soccer League.

== Personal life ==
His younger brother is Saša Ivković.

== Honours ==
OFK Bačka

- Vojvodina League West: 2012–13
- Serbian League Vojvodina: 2013–14
