= Ante Živković =

Croatian footballer

Personal information
- Date of birth: 21 May 1993 (age 33)
- Place of birth: Šibenik, Croatia
- Height: 1.87 m (6 ft 2 in)
- Position: Forward

Team information
- Current team: Posušje
- Number: 32

Youth career
- –2011: Šibenik

Senior career*
Years	Team	Apps	(Gls)
2011–2017	Šibenik	60	(10)
2014	→ Toronto Croatia (loan)	6	(6)
2017–2018	Novigrad	30	(6)
2018–2019	Dugopolje	25	(5)
2019–2020	Aluminij	33	(15)
2020–2021	Ümraniyespor	14	(0)
2021–2022	Borac Banja Luka	4	(0)
2022	→ Radnik Bijeljina (loan)	14	(7)
2022	Kukësi	8	(2)
2023	Hebar	14	(1)
2023–2025	Chindia Târgoviște	26	(9)
2025–	Posušje	39	(5)
- * Club domestic league appearances and goals as of 12 June 2026

Ante Živković (born 21 May 1993) is a Croatian professional footballer who plays as a forward with Posušje.

== Career ==
Živković was trained through the HNK Šibenik academy system and made his professional debut in the Croatian First League in 2011. In 2014, he was loaned to play abroad in the Canadian Soccer League with Toronto Croatia. During the 2014 playoffs, he contributed two goals in the preliminary match against SC Waterloo Region. In the sound round, he registered a goal against Kingston FC and was featured in the CSL Championship match against York Region Shooters. In 2017, he signed with NK Novigrad in the Croatian Second League.

After a season with Novigrad, he played with NK Dugopolje, where he finished as the club's top goalscorer. In 2019, he played abroad for the second time with NK Aluminij in the Slovenian PrvaLiga. On 8 August 2020, Ümraniyespor of the TFF First League signed Živković.

In June 2021, he joined Bosnian Premier League club Borac Banja Luka. Živković debuted for Borac in a 2021–22 UEFA Champions League qualifying round against Romanian side CFR Cluj on 6 July 2021. In 2022, he was loaned to league rivals FK Radnik Bijeljina. In June 2022, he signed a contract with FK Kukësi in the Kategoria Superiore. His contract with the Albanian club was terminated around December 2022 with allegations that the club employed physical force in order for Živković to consent.

In the winter of 2023, he signed with Hebar Pazardzhik in the Bulgarian First League. He departed the club in the summer of 2023. Following his departure from Bulgaria, he signed with Chindia Târgoviște in Romania's Liga II in September 10, 2023.

He returned to the Bosnian top-tier league to sign with Posušje on January 12, 2025.

== Honours ==
Šibenik

- Treća HNL: 2014–15
