= Adam Shaban =

Kenyan footballer (born 1983)

Personal information
- Full name: Adam Shaban Wesa
- Date of birth: 28 February 1983 (age 43)
- Place of birth: Nairobi, Kenya
- Position: Defender

Senior career*
Years	Team	Apps	(Gls)
2001–2006	Mathare United		
2006–2007	Tusker F.C.		
2008–2010	Nybergsund	7	(0)
2011	Brumunddal		
2012	Lillehammer		
2012–2013	Al-Shabab Club		
2014	Kingston FC		
2014–2015	Milton SC		

International career
2002–2007	Kenya	34	(0)
- * Club domestic league appearances and goals

Adam Shaban (born 28 February 1983) is a Kenyan former footballer who played in the Kenyan Premier League, Norwegian First Division, 2. divisjon, Oman Professional League, and the Canadian Soccer League.

== Playing career ==
Shaban began his career in 2001 in his native Kenya with Mathare United of the Kenyan Premier League. In 2006, he transferred to Tusker F.C. and won a league title in 2007. In 2008, he went abroad to Europe to sign with Nybergsund IL-Trysil of the Norwegian First Division. He had further stints in Norway with Brumunddal Fotball, and Lillehammer FK. In 2012, he signed with Al-Shabab Club of the Oman Professional League. On 13 March 2014 Kingston FC of the Canadian Soccer League signed Shaban to a contract. On 29 August 2014 he was transferred to Milton SC.

== International career ==
Shaban played for the Kenya national football team, and made 34 appearances. He was selected for the 2004 African Cup of Nations tournament.
