= Hector Mackie =

Scottish-born English footballer

Personal information
- Date of birth: 10 May 1988 (age 38)
- Place of birth: Inverness, Scotland
- Position: Midfielder

Youth career
- Tottenham Hotspur

Senior career*
Years	Team	Apps	(Gls)
2004–2005	Welling United		
2006–2007	Stevenage		
2006–2007	→ Cambridge City (loan)	3	(0)
2007–2008	St Albans City	6	(0)
2008–2009	Potters Bar Town		
2008–2009	St Albans City	17	(0)
2009–2011	Bath City	27	(2)
2010–2011	St Albans City	2	(0)
2011–2012	Hayes & Yeading United	11	(1)
2011–2012	Yate Town		
2012–2013	St Albans City		
2012–2013	Harlow Town		
2012–2013	Wingate & Finchley		
2014–2015	York Region Shooters		
2019–2022	Harlow Town	20	(8)
- * Club domestic league appearances and goals

Hector Mackie (born 10 May 1988) is a Scottish-born English former footballer who played as a midfielder.

== Club career ==
=== Early career ===
Mackie was a product of the youth system of Tottenham Hotspur. In his early career, he began playing at the local level with clubs such as Welling United and Stevenage. In 2006, Welling United released him from his contract. Mackie would be loaned to Cambridge City during the 2006–7 season. In 2007, he began his first stint with St Albans City. The following season he joined league rivals Potters Bar Town after being released by St. Albans. However, he would miss the majority of the season with Potters Bar as he sustained a serious leg injury.

In 2008, he returned to his former club St. Albans to compete in the National League South. Mackie would depart from St. Albans and join league rivals Bath City. In his debut season with Bath, he helped the club secure promotion and contributed a goal in the promotion playoffs to secure promotion. He was re-signed by Bath during their run in the National League and appeared in 9 matches and scored 1 goal. Midway through the season, he joined National League North side Gloucester City. The next season he returned to the National League to sign with Hayes & Yeading United. He recorded his first goal for the club on 27 September 2011, against Kettering Town. In total, he appeared in 11 matches and recorded 1 goal for Hayes. After the FA Cup tournament, he was released from the club.

After his stint in the National League, he returned to the local circuit to sign with Yate Town. He would leave the club after the conclusion of the season. In 2013, he joined Wingate & Finchley.

=== Canada ===
In the summer of 2014, Mackie ventured abroad to play in the southern Ontario-based Canadian Soccer League with the York Region Shooters. In his debut match, he would record two goals against Kingston on 27 May 2014. Throughout the season, he would help the club produce a perfect season initially by finishing first in the league's first division. Mackie would appear in the opening match of the playoffs, where he contributed a goal against Brampton City United that advanced the club to the next round. The Vaughan-based team advanced to the championship final match after Mackie scored the lone goal against the North York Astros. He would participate in the championship match against Toronto Croatia, where the Shooters would defeat Toronto in a penalty shootout in extra time.

Mackie re-signed with York Region for the 2015 season. York Region would secure a postseason berth by finishing third in the division. The Shooters would defeat Burlington SC in the preliminary round of the playoffs. The defending champions were eliminated in the next round by Toronto Croatia.

=== England ===
Mackie returned to the regional English circuit in 2020 to play with his former team Harlow Town. Harlow re-signed him for the 2021–22 season.

== Honors ==
York Region Shooters

- CSL Championship: 2014
- Canadian Soccer League First Division: 2014
