= Vladimir Vujović (footballer, born 1985) =

Serbian footballer

Personal information
- Full name: Vladimir Vujović
- Date of birth: 20 December 1985 (age 40)
- Place of birth: Belgrade, SFR Yugoslavia
- Height: 1.75 m (5 ft 9 in)
- Positions: Striker; winger

Senior career*
Years	Team	Apps	(Gls)
2003–2008	IMT		
2008–2010	Sevojno	57	(16)
2010	Sloboda Užice	7	(0)
2011	Jagodina	5	(0)
2012	Metalac Gornji Milanovac	11	(0)
2012	Bežanija	11	(3)
2013	Novi Pazar	7	(0)
2013–2014	Timok	24	(2)
2014	Sloga Kraljevo	4	(0)
2015	Burlington SC	18	(12)
2016	PKB Padinska Skela		
2016–2017	OFK Odžaci	20	(1)
2017–2018	Šumadija Aranđelovac		
2018–2019	Milton SC	14	(5)
Total		178	(39)
- * Club domestic league appearances and goals

Vladimir Vujović (Serbian Cyrillic: Владимир Вујовић; born 20 December 1985) is a Serbian retired footballer who played as a forward.

== Club career ==
=== Early career ===
Vujović began his career in 2003 in the Belgrade Zone League with FK IMT. He played in the Serbian First League in 2008 with FK Sevojno. In his second season with Sevojno, he assisted the club in reaching the 2008–09 Serbian Cup final where they were defeated by FK Partizan. Their appearance in the cup final guaranteed the club a spot in the Europa League. Throughout the tournament, Sevojno also faced Red Star Belgrade in the semifinal where Vujović contributed a goal that advanced the club to the finals.

He would participate in all four matches during the club's run in the 2009–10 UEFA Europa League against FBK Kaunas, and Lille. Vujović would contribute a goal against Kaunas that advanced the club to the next round where they were eliminated from the competition by Lille.

=== Serbian Superliga ===
The following season, the club merged with Sloboda Užice and secured promotion to the Serbian top-tier league. In his debut season in the Serbian first division, he appeared in 7 matches.

After a three-year tenure with the Sloboda organization, he was transferred to league rivals Jagodina during the 2011 summer transfer market. For the remainder of the 2011-12 season, he played with Metalac Gornji Milanovac. His final season in the Serbian top division occurred during the 2012-13 season with Novi Pazar.

=== Serbian First League ===
Vujović returned to the second division where he played with FK Timok during the 2013-14 season. He would also have stints with Bežanija and Sloga Kraljevo.

=== Canada ===
In the summer of 2015, he ventured abroad for a season to play in the Southern Ontario-based Canadian Soccer League with Burlington SC. Vujović would record his first hat-trick for the club on 31 May 2015, against Toronto Croatia. He would produce another hat-trick the following week against Niagara United. He would finish the campaign as the club's top goal scorer with 12 goals from 18 games. His efforts also helped Burlington in securing a postseason berth in the league's first division. Burlington would be eliminated from the playoffs in the first round by the York Region Shooters.

=== Later career ===
After a season in Canada, he returned to Serbia where he initially played in the third-tier league with Padinska Skela. Following a season in the lower-tier leagues, he returned to the second division to sign with OFK Odžaci. He would appear in 20 matches and recorded 1 goal for Odžaci. His final run in the third division was with Šumadija Aranđelovac during the 2017-18 season.

After a brief spell in Serbia, he returned to Canada for the 2018 season to sign with Milton SC in the CSL's second division. In his debut season with Milton, he finished as the club's second-highest goal scorer with 5 goals.

== Honours ==
Sevojno

- Serbian Cup: Runner-up 2008–09
