= Halton United =

Canadian association football team

- Full name: Halton United
- Founded: 2013 (as Burlington S.C.)
- Stadium: Milton Community Sports Park; Milton, Ontario
- League: Canadian Academy of Soccer League
Home colours	Away colours

Halton United are a Canadian soccer club based in Milton, Ontario, and is a member of the Canadian Academy of Soccer League. The club was formed in 2013 and became a member of the Canadian Soccer League (CSL) under the name Burlington SC. They played their home matches at Nelson Stadium in Burlington, Ontario. After three seasons in the CSL the club disbanded their CSL senior team in order to become one of the founding members of the CAF Supergroup Open Division. After a brief sabbatical from the CSL, Burlington returned for the 2017 season to play in the Second Division.

In 2018, the club was renamed Halton United, and in 2019 became a founding member of the Canadian Academy of Soccer League (CASL).

== History ==
Original logo

Burlington SC was formed and joined the Canadian Soccer League on May 2, 2013. The announcement made history as Burlington SC became the city's first professional soccer club. The club's inaugural head coach was William Etchu Tabi. Tabi constructed a roster mostly with international signings and a few domestic players. Notable acquisitions were Nicholas Lindsay, Judah Hernandez, Nikola Stanojevic, Obrad Dragosavac, Vladimir Vujasinović, Miroslav Bjelos, and Nenad Nikolić.

The team made its debut on May 19, 2013, in a match against Kingston FC, where Lindsay recorded the club's historic first goal in a 2–1 defeat. Throughout the season Burlington struggled to maintain a postseason berth, thus failing to secure a playoff berth by finishing tenth in the overall standings. For the 2014 season the club signed more European imports by bringing in Vladimir Vujović, Nenad Simic, and Bojan Stepanović. Burlington improved from their previous season by finishing fifth in the overall standings. Their opponents in the quarterfinals were North York Astros, but they were eliminated from the playoffs by a score of 4–0. At the conclusion of the season Vujasinovic was awarded the CSL Goalkeeper of the Year award.

In 2015, the club for the second year in a row qualified for the playoffs by finishing sixth in the overall standings. In the first round of the postseason Burlington faced the York Region Shooters, but suffered a 4–2 defeat. At the CSL awards banquet Burlington went home with three awards: CSL Goalkeeper of the Year to Andrew Stinger, Stanojevic received the Defender of the Year, and the club received the Fair Play and Respect Award.

In 2016, the league announced that Burlington were not returning for the 2016 season. In 2016, Burlington became one of the founding member of the CAF LIKA Supergroup Open Division. After a one-year absence from the CSL the team returned to the league for the 2017 season in order to compete in the Second Division. In 2018, the club was renamed Halton United, and for the second consecutive season reached the CSL Championship final but were defeated by FC Vorkuta B. In 2019, Halton along with Comet FC, Galaxy SC, London City SC, Milton SC, and Star FC became charter members of the Canadian Academy of Soccer League (CASL).

== Head coaches ==
Years	Name	Nation
2013–2015	William Etchu Tabi	Cameroon
2017	Bruno Giannotti	

== Honours ==
- CSL II Championship runner-up: 2017, 2018

== Seasons ==
=== First team ===
Season	League	Teams	Record	Rank	Playoffs	Ref
2013	Canadian Soccer League (First Division)	12	7–0–15	10th	did not qualify	
2014	Canadian Soccer League (First Division)	10	7–3–8	5th	Quarterfinals	
2015	Canadian Soccer League (First Division)	12	8–3–11	6th	Quarterfinals	
2017	Canadian Soccer League (Second Division)	8	10–1–3	2nd	Finals	
2018	Canadian Soccer League (Second Division)	6	10–0–5	2nd	Finals	
2019	Canadian AOFS Soccer League	6		3rd	–	
2021	Canadian AOFS Soccer League	6		3rd	–	
2024	Canadian AOFS Soccer League	6	1–4–0	3rd	–	

=== Second team ===
Season	League	Teams	Record	Rank	Playoffs	Ref
2014	Canadian Soccer League (Second Division)	9	7–3–6	5th	Quarterfinals	
2015	Canadian Soccer League (Second Division)	10	9–3–6	4th	Quarterfinals	
