= Warrior Field =

Sports stadium in Waterloo, Ontario

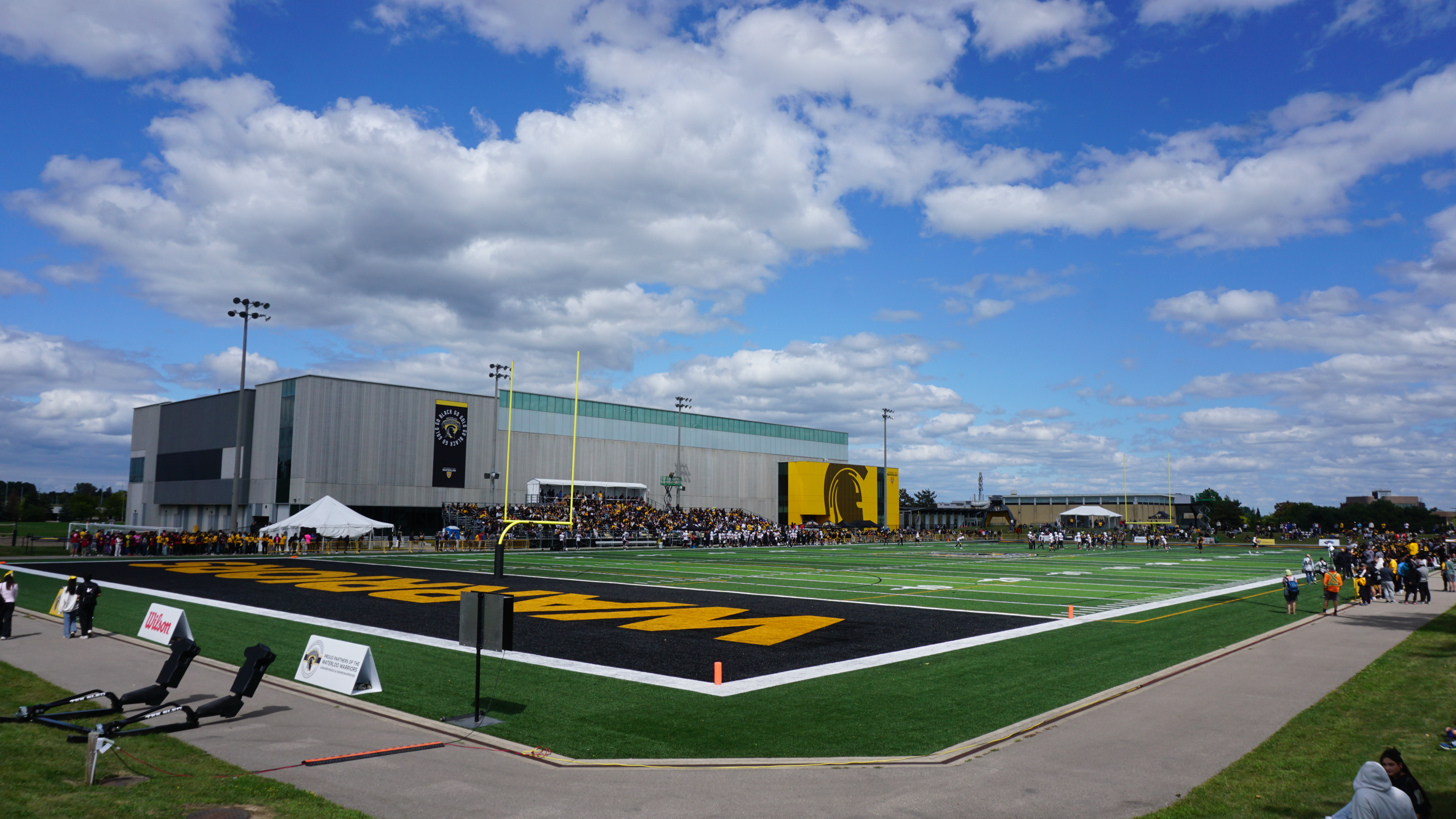
- Interactive map of Warrior Field
- Location: Waterloo, Ontario
- Coordinates: 43.47429°N 80.54963°W
- Owner: University of Waterloo
- Operator: University of Waterloo
- Capacity: 1,700 (grandstand); 5,700 (total)
- Surface: FieldTurf Duraspine PRO

Construction
- Groundbreaking: 2008
- Built: 2009
- Opened: 2009
- Renovated: 2010

Tenants
- Waterloo Warriors (2009-present); SC Waterloo Region (CSL) (2014-present)

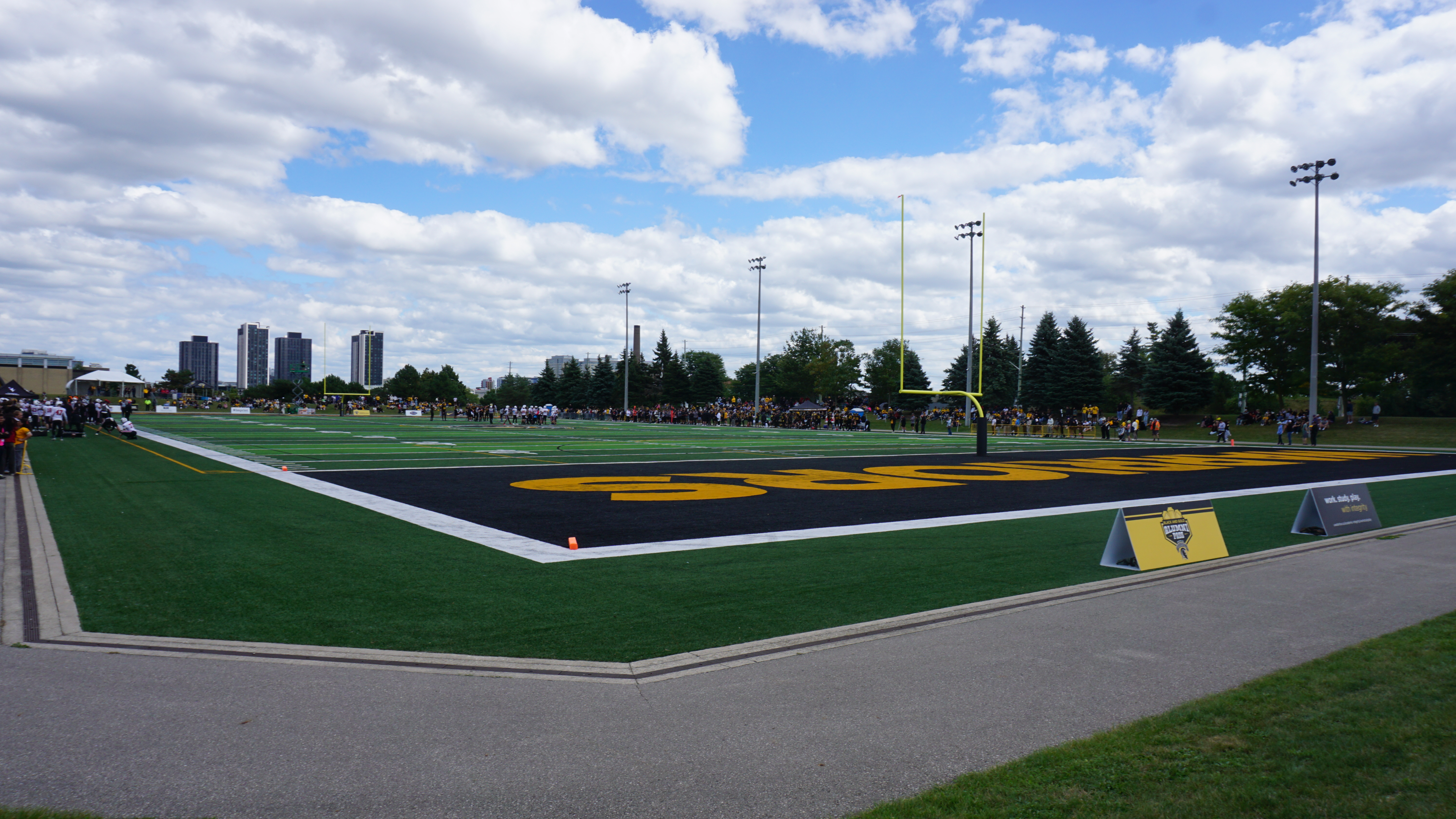
Bern seating

Warrior Field is a sports stadium in Waterloo, Ontario with a seated capacity of 1,700 in the grandstand, and 5,700 overall including lawn and endzone areas. It is home to the Waterloo Warriors football, soccer, and field hockey teams while also being available for the school's club teams as well. Warrior Field was built in time for the 2009 season and was renovated further in 2010 with the addition of grandstand seating and area development. Previously, teams played at University Stadium, which is now occupied by Wilfrid Laurier University athletics.
