= Nelson Stadium =

Coordinates: 43.359674°N 79.767201°W

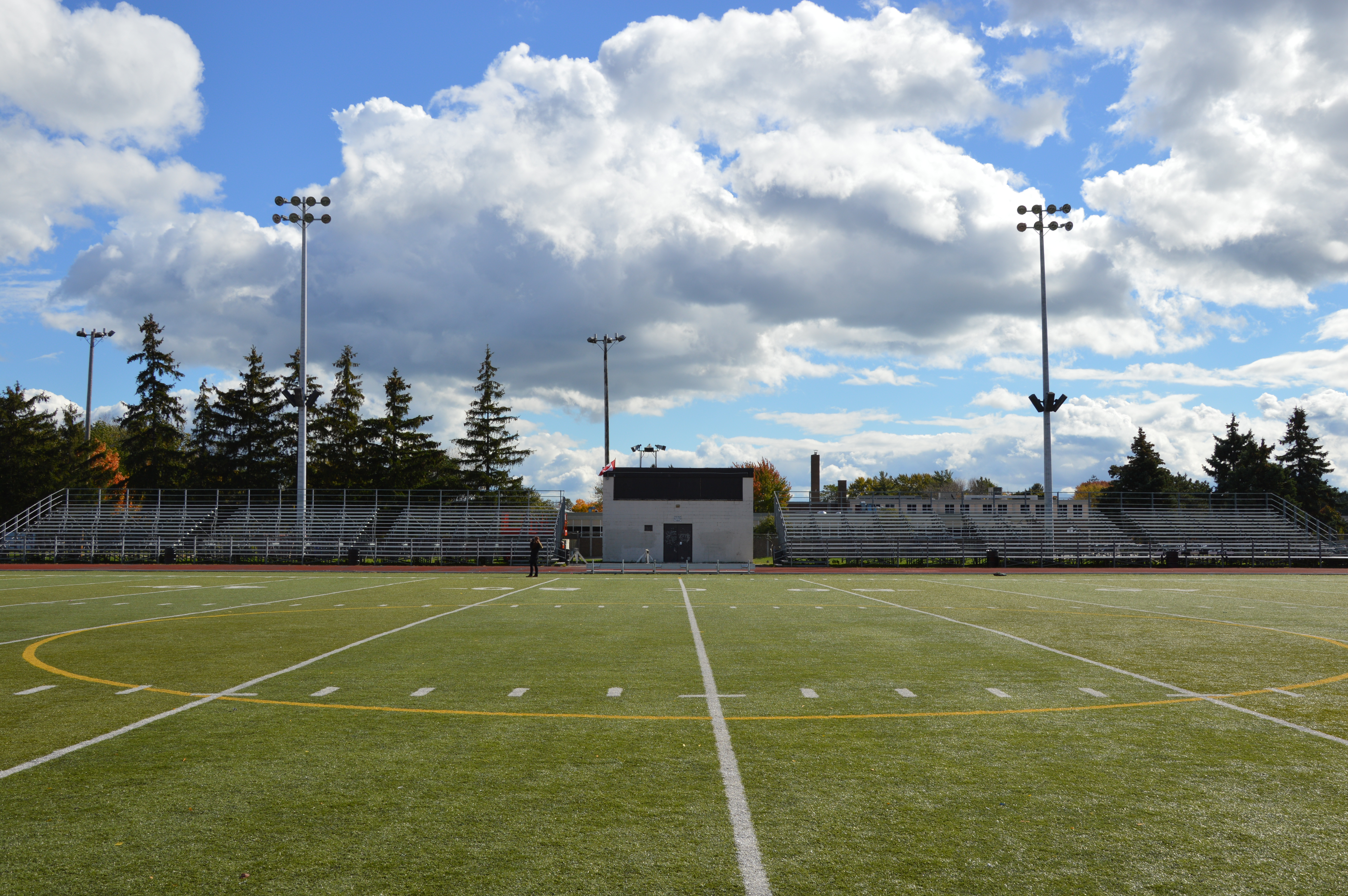
- Interactive map of Nelson Stadium
- Full name: Nelson Stadium
- Location: Burlington, Ontario
- Owner: Halton District School Board
- Capacity: 1,500
- Surface: Artificial

Construction
- Built: 1965
- Renovated: 2011

Tenants
- Nelson Lords, Burlington Stampeders

Nelson Stadium is a multi-purpose outdoor sports facility in Burlington, Ontario. The stadium is owned by the Halton District School Board and is operated by Nelson High School. It is located on New Street, Burlington's south-east district. Its capacity is 1,500 and it is the home venue to the Nelson Lords and the Burlington Stampeders of the Burlington Minor Football Association. The facility is primarily used for Canadian football, soccer, and baseball.

In 1987, the stadium played host to the Kangaroo Kup, the first ever international touch football event sanctioned by the Federation of International Touch (FIT). The "kup" was a three-test series contested between Australia and Canada across four divisions (Men's, Women's Mixed, Men's Masters). While the event itself was the first to be played under the Federation's newly minted playing rules, it also featured a lead-up series of matches which included one round played under Australian Touch Association rules, and a second under Canadian Touch Football rules. The event served to springboard Canada onto the international touch football scene, with the country joining as a member of the Federation and attending the inaugural Touch Football World Cup, which was held on Australia's Gold Coast the following year.

In 2011, a joint project between Halton District School Board and the City of Burlington was announced which resulted in the stadiums renovation. The renovations included aesthetic improvements, purchase of player benches, improved lighting, and refurbishment of media box. On May 2, 2013, Burlington SC announced the use of Nelson Stadium as their home venue.

Since 1966 the stadium has been home to the Burlington Minor Football AssociationBurlington Minor Football Association. They have hosted many events there, including flag football and tackle football games. The association's rep tackle football team: the Burlington Stampeders (Formerly the Burlington Braves) have played home games at the stadium.
