= William Etchu Tabi =

Cameroonian footballer (born 1982)

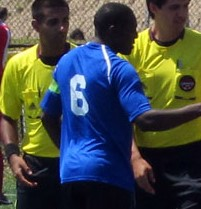
- Tabi in 2013

Personal information
- Full name: William Etchu Tabi
- Date of birth: November 13, 1982 (age 43)
- Place of birth: Mamfe, Cameroon
- Height: 1.74 m (5 ft 9 in)
- Position: Midfielder

Senior career*
Years	Team	Apps	(Gls)
2000	Sable FC	17	(6)
2001–2003	San Lorenzo	22	(0)
2003	Samsunspor	2	(0)
2004–2006	Široki Brijeg		
2006–2007	Posušje	17	(0)
2007–2008	Šibenik	21	(0)
2008–2009	Croatia Sesvete	11	(0)
2009	Zrinjski Mostar	5	(0)
2010	Iskra Zelina	14	(0)
2010–2011	Aluminium Hormozgan		
2011–2012	Trešnjevka	4	(0)
2012	London City		
2013–2015	Burlington SC		

International career
1999	Cameroon U20	19	(5)

Managerial career
- 2013–2015: Burlington SC
- 2019–2024: Galaxy FC
- * Club domestic league appearances and goals

William Etchu Tabi (born November 13, 1982) is a Cameroonian former footballer who serves as the Skills Development coach for Burlington SC Academy.

== Club career ==
=== Early career ===
Tabi played in the Cameroon Première Division with Sable FC and competed in the 2000 CAF Champions League. In 2001, he played abroad in the Argentine Primera División with San Lorenzo. After a season in Argentina, he played in the Turkish Süper Lig with Samsunspor.

=== Bosnia ===
In 2004, Tabi signed with Široki Brijeg in the Premier League of Bosnia and Herzegovina. In his debut season with Široki Brijeg, he appeared in the 2004–05 UEFA Champions League against Neftçi. The following season, he participated in the 2005–06 UEFA Cup against FC Basel. He also helped the club secure the league title. In 2006, he signed with league rivals Posušje for a season.

=== Croatia ===
After several seasons in Bosnia, he joined Croatian side Šibenik in 2007. Following his short stint with Šibenik, he joined league rivals Croatia Sesvete.

=== Zrinjski Mostar ===
In 2009, he returned to the Bosnian top tier by signing with Zrinjski Mostar. His contract with Zrinjski Mostar was terminated during the winter transfer market. Tabi played the remainder of the season in the Treća HNL with Zelina.

=== Iran ===
Tabi played in the Azadegan League in 2010 by signing with Aluminium Hormozgan. Once the season concluded, he left the Iranian circuit. After his stint in Asia, he returned to Croatia to play for Trešnjevka.

=== Canada ===
In 2012, he played in the Canadian Soccer League with London City. The following season, he signed with the expansion side Burlington SC as a player-coach.

== International career ==
He was also part of the Cameroon U-20 team at the 1999 FIFA World Youth Championship.

== Managerial career ==
In 2013, Tabi transitioned to the managerial side, being named player-coach for Burlington SC in the Canadian Soccer League. His first successful season as a manager was the 2014 season, where Burlington secured a playoff berth by finishing fifth in the league's first division. Their playoff journey concluded in the opening round after a defeat to the North York Astros. In his final season with Burlington, he led the club to a playoff berth by finishing sixth. Burlington was eliminated in the first round by the York Region Shooters.

He is involved as a coach with the Burlington SC Academy in the field of Skills Development. In 2019, he served as the head coach for Galaxy FC in the Canadian Academy of Soccer League.

== External sources ==
- 1HNL Stats at HRrepka.
