= Milton SC =

Canadian association football team

- Full name: Milton Soccer Club
- Founded: 2014
- Stadium: Milton Community Park; Milton, Ontario
- Owner(s): Jasmin Halkić
- Coach: Suad Tihak
- League: Canadian Academy of Soccer League
- 2019: Regular season: 2nd Playoffs:None
- Website: http://www.miltonsc.ca/
Home colours	Away colours

Milton SC is a Canadian soccer club formed in 2014. The team is currently a member of the Canadian Academy of Soccer League. Their home venue is located at Milton Community Sports Park in the town of Milton, Ontario.

== History ==
In 2014, professional soccer returned to the town of Milton under a joint effort by Jasmin Halkic and his son Jasmin Halkic Jr. Milton entered the Second Division of the Canadian Soccer League. Their original home venue was located at Bishop Reding SS and the team acquired the services of Stefan Ristic, Slavko Nenadov, Bajro Junuzovic, and Agata Jefferson. In their debut season the club finished sixth in the standings, and reached the semifinals, where they faced SC Waterloo, but were defeated by a score of 4–2.

The following season Milton was promoted to the First Division while maintaining a reserve squad in the second division, and Amir Osmanlic was appointed head coach. In order to remain competitive in the league's top division the club recruited several imports such as Kenyan international Adam Shaban, and Radovan Ivković, Zoran Belošević, Adnan Smajic, and Predrag Papaz from Europe. Milton clinched the final postseason berth by finishing seventh in the standings. Their opponents in the quarterfinals were Toronto Croatia, but were eliminated by a score of 4–0. In the second division Milton reached the CSL Championship final where they faced Waterloo and they won the match by a score of 3–1 with goals coming from Smajić, Danny Jirta, and Lucky Maghori. At the conclusion of the season the league awarded Osmanlic with the CSL Coach of the Year award.

On August 29, 2016, Milton partnered with Youth Development Soccer Academy to serve as its youth wing. For the 2016 season Milton strengthened their roster with the signings of Haris Fazlagić, Vladimir Vujasinović, Dado Hadrovic, and Damion Scott. Milton struggled throughout the regular season in their second season in the top division, but received a postseason berth due to a shortage of teams for the 2016 season. In the first round of the playoffs they faced regular season champions York Region Shooters, where they were eliminated from the competition by a 5–0 defeat.

In 2019, Milton along with Comet FC, Galaxy SC, Halton United, London City SC, and Star FC became charter members of the Canadian Academy of Soccer League (CASL).

== Roster ==
As of December 2, 2019

Note: Flags indicate national team as defined under FIFA eligibility rules; some limited exceptions apply. Players may hold more than one non-FIFA nationality.

No.	Pos.	Nation	Player
-			Kenen Ajkic
-			Ekeke Amotueb
-			Nikolas Anderson
-	FW	MNE	Todor Babovic
-			Jason Burbonk
-			Diego Carlos
-			Leon Huber
-			Sasa Kraljic
-			Deny Jonson

No.	Pos.	Nation	Player
-			Matube Mambuto
-			Ahmad Muhamed
-			Slobodan Perovic
-			Zoran Pusica
-			Admir Sahat
-	FW	BIH	Adnan Smajic
-			Igor Tosic
-	DF	SRB	Vladimir Vujović

== Honours ==
Milton SC

- Canadian AOFS Soccer League: 2023

Milton SC II

- CSL II Championship: 2015

== Head coaches ==
Milton SC

- Jasmin Halkic (2014)
- Amir Osmanlic (2015–2016)
- Jasmin Halkic (2017)
- Suad Tihak (2018–)

Milton SC II

- Osman Begovic (2015)

== Seasons ==
=== First team ===
Season	League	Teams	Record	Rank	Playoffs	Ref
2014	Canadian Soccer League (Second Division)	9	6–4–6	6th	Semifinals	
2015	Canadian Soccer League (First Division)	16	8–3–11	7th	Quarterfinals	
2016	Canadian Soccer League (First Division)	8	4–4–13	8th	Quarterfinals	
2017	Canadian Soccer League (First Division)	8	2–2–10	6th	Quarterfinals	
2018	Canadian Soccer League (Second Division)	12	7–0–8	4th	did not qualify	
2019	Canadian AOFS Soccer League	6		2nd	–	
2021	Canadian AOFS Soccer League	6		2nd	–	
2023	Canadian AOFS Soccer League	6		1st	–	
2024	Canadian AOFS Soccer League	6	3–2–0	2nd	–	

=== Second team ===
Season	League	Teams	Record	Rank	Playoffs	Ref
2015	Canadian Soccer League (Second Division)	10	9–5–4	3rd	Champions	
