= Tripoli =

Tripoli (Greek: Τρίπολη) or Tripolis (Ancient Greek: Τρίπολις, both lit. 'three cities') may refer to:

== Places ==
=== Greece ===
- Tripoli, Greece, a modern city in Arcadia regional unit, Peloponnese region
- Tripolis (region of Arcadia), a district in ancient Arcadia, Greece
- Tripolis (Larisaia), an ancient Greek city in the Pelasgiotis district, Thessaly, near Larissa
- Tripolis (Perrhaebia), a district of three cities in ancient Perrhaebia, Thessaly, Greece
- Tripolis (region of Laconia), a district in ancient Laconia, Greece

=== Lebanon ===
- Tripoli, Lebanon, the second largest city in Lebanon
  - Tripoli District, Lebanon, a district in North Governorate
  - Tripolis (region of Phoenicia), a maritime district in ancient Phoenicia
  - County of Tripoli, one of the medieval Crusader states centered in Tripoli, Lebanon
  - Tripoli Eyalet, a province of the Ottoman Empire centered in Tripoli, Lebanon
- Port of Tripoli (Lebanon)

=== Libya ===
- Tripoli, Libya, the capital city of Libya
  - Tripoli District, Libya, one of Libya's districts
  - Tripolitania, a historic region of Libya
    - Ottoman Tripolitania, frequently described as the "Kingdom of Tripoli"
    - Tripolis (region of Africa), a district in ancient Tripolitania
    - Islamic Tripolitania and Cyrenaica, historical polity

=== Turkey ===
- Tripolis on the Meander, an ancient city In Asia Minor, on the borders of Lydia, Caria and Phrygia
- Tripolis (Pontus), an ancient Greek city in the Pontus region of Turkey
  - Tirebolu, the modern city in Giresun Province, Turkey, taking its name from and located on the site

=== United States ===
- Tripoli, Iowa, a city in Bremer County, Iowa, United States
- Tripoli, Wisconsin, an unincorporated community in Wisconsin, United States
- New Tripoli, Pennsylvania, a village in Pennsylvania, United States

== People ==
- Leo of Tripoli (early 10th century), a Greek renegade and fleet commander for the Abbasid Caliphate
- Melisende of Tripoli (fl. around 1160), daughter of the ruler of the Crusader County of Tripoli, Lebanon
- Salvatore Tripoli (1904–1990), American professional boxer and Olympic medalist
- Tony Tripoli (born 1969), American actor and LGBT rights activist
- Jaman Tripoli (fl. 1998-2005), American soccer player
- Pietro Tripoli (born 1987), Italian footballer

== Entertainment ==
- Tripoli (film), a 1950 American adventure film
- "Tripoli", a song by Matthew Good Band from The Audio of Being
- "Tripoli", a song by Pinback from Pinback
- Moses Tripoli, a reincarnation of the character Hanzee Dent in the TV show Fargo

== Sport ==
- AC Tripoli, an association football club in Tripoli, Lebanon
- Al Mouttahed Tripoli, or United Club Tripoli, a sports club in Tripoli, Lebanon
- Asteras Tripolis, an association football club in Tripoli, Greece
- Tripoli Grand Prix, a car race held between 1925-1940 outside Tripoli, Libya

== Other uses ==
- USS Tripoli, various US Navy ships
- Rotten stone, a polishing agent also known as tripoli

== See also ==
- Siege of Tripoli (disambiguation)
- Bombardment of Tripoli (disambiguation)
- History of Tripoli (disambiguation)
- Raymond of Tripoli (disambiguation)
- Tripoli air crash (disambiguation)
- Tripoli Airport (disambiguation)
- Tripoli Creek (disambiguation)
- Tripoli Lake (disambiguation)
- Tarablus (disambiguation), Arabic form of the Greek word
- Tri-Cities (disambiguation), English equivalent of the Greek word
- Three Towns, another English equivalent of the Greek word
