= 2004 Open Canada Cup =

Tournament details
- Country: Canada
- Teams: 24

Final positions
- Champions: Windsor Border Stars (1st title)
- Runners-up: Ottawa St. Anthony Italia

Tournament statistics
- Matches played: 24
- Goals scored: 70 (2.92 per match)
- Top goal scorer: (Argentina) Tati Errecalde (4 goals)

The 2004 Open Canada Cup was the 7th edition of the Canadian Professional Soccer League's open league cup tournament, running from late May through early September. Windsor Border Stars defeated Ottawa St. Anthony Italia 4-3 in a penalty shootout in the final played at Cove Road Stadium, London, Ontario. The victory marked Windsor's first piece of silverware and became the second expansion club to win the open tournament in their debut season. Ottawa also recorded a milestone by becoming the first amateur team to reach the finals. The tournament expanded to include a record number of 24 clubs throughout Ontario.

The Ontario amateur clubs began the tournament in the preliminary rounds, while the CPSL clubs received an automatic bye to the second round. For the third straight year, London City were granted the hosting rights to the finals, which granted them a wild card match if they were defeated in the earlier rounds. Toronto Croatia decided for the first time to opt out of the tournament to compete in the annual Croatian-North American Soccer Tournament, while the rest of the CPSL clubs competed in the competition.

== Qualification ==
Enter in Preliminary Round	Enter in Second Round
OSL/OCSL/WOSL; 8 teams/4 teams/2 teams	CPSL; 10 teams
Ontario Soccer League: 777 Soccer Club; Benfica Toronto; Brampton Dynamic Kickers; Hearts S.C.; Peniche S. C.; Real Vaughan; Scarborough GS United; Woodbridge Sora; Ottawa Carleton Soccer League: Capital City Ambassadors; Capital United; Ottawa Royals S.C.; Ottawa St. Anthony Italia; Western Ontario Soccer League: AEK London; London Portuguese	Canadian Professional Soccer League: Brampton Stallions; Durham Storm; Hamilton Thunder; London City; Metro Lions; North York Astros; St. Catharines Wolves; Toronto Supra; Vaughan Shooters; Windsor Border Stars

== First round ==
May 21, 2004	Real Vaughan (OSL)	2–1 (a.e.t.)	Ottawa Royals (OCSL)	Vaughan, Ontario
8:00 ET	Rag Assamd 39'; Jeff Gonselves 104'	(Report)	Dan Cheney 63'	Stadium: The Soccer Centre

May 21, 2004	Woodbridge Sora (OSL)	0–3	AEK London (WOSL)	London, Ontario
8:40 ET		(Report)	Terry Peak 11'; Martin Painter 70'; Selam Kaddory 89'	Stadium: Cove Road Stadium

May 22, 2004	777 SC (OSL)	3–2 (a.e.t.)	Capital United (OCSL)	Vaughan, Ontario
6:00 ET	Sergio Rivadeneira 15'; Carlos Dias 70'; Kyle Jones 96'	(Report)	Morris Richard 45'; Julien Holdrinet 79'	Stadium: The Soccer Centre

May 23, 2004	GS United (OSL)	6–0	Brampton Dynamic Kickers (OSL)	Vaughan, Ontario
2:00 ET	Tom Kouzmanis; Tom Kouzmanis; Gary DeLeon; Gary DeLeon; Vaughan Ward; Neill Mair	(Report)		Stadium: The Soccer Centre

May 23, 2004	Capital City Ambassadors (OCSL)	0–0 (5–4 p)	Toronto Benfica (OSL)	Vaughan, Ontario
4:30 ET		(Report)		Stadium: The Soccer Centre

May 24, 2004	Hearts SC (OSL)	1–1 (3–5 p)	Peniche (OSL)	Vaughan, Ontario
4:00 ET	Pedram Eynolhagh 10'	(Report)	Ricky Da Ponte 45'	Stadium: The Soccer Centre

July 1, 2004	777 Soccer Club (OSL)	3–2	Peniche (OSL)	Vaughan, Ontario
8:38 ET	Sergio Rivardeneira 28'; Kyle Jones 44'; Alex Lopez 82'	(Report)	Des Mpenza 56'; Tony Tavares 94'	Stadium: The Soccer Centre

July 3, 2004	Ottawa St. Anthony Italia (OCSL)	3–2 (a.e.t.)	London Portuguese (WOSL)	London, Ontario
4:30 ET	Alain Njima 6'; Urbain Some 82'; Alain Njima 114'	(Report)	Erald Pope 56'; Erald Pope 74'	Stadium: Cove Road Stadium

== Second round ==
July 1, 2004	St. Catharines Wolves (CPSL)	0–1	Windsor Border Stars (CPSL)	St. Catharines, Ontario
8:15 ET		(Report)	Mike Vonella 49'	Stadium: Club Roma Stadium

July 1, 2004	Durham Storm (CPSL)	0–2	AEK London (WOSL)	London, Ontario
8:38 ET		(Report)	Martin Painter 26'; Kim Balatouka 88'	Stadium: Cove Road Stadium

July 2, 2004	Brampton Hitmen (CPSL)	1–2	North York Astros (CPSL)	London, Ontario
5:00 ET	Kurt Mella 62'		Boris Krimus 7'; Alex Braletic 90'	Stadium: Cove Road Stadium

July 2, 2004	London City (CPSL)	1–0	Hamilton Thunder (CPSL)	London, Ontario
8:38 ET	Paul Munster 93'	(Report)		Stadium: Cove Road Stadium

July 3, 2004	Capital City Ambassadors (OCSL)	2–1	777 S.C. (OSL)	London, Ontario
3:00 ET	Mili Ombasic 21'; Twmde Temidire 44'	(Report)	Alex Lopez 70'	Stadium: Cove Road Stadium

July 4, 2004	Toronto Supra (CPSL)	2–3 (a.e.t.)	Ottawa St. Anthony Italia (OCSL)	London, Ontario
5:30 ET	Michael Diluca 76'; Michael Diluca 84'	(Report)	Huffman Eja-Tabe 23'; Urbain Some 93'; Johnny Schieda 95'	Stadium: Cove Road Stadium

July 4, 2004	Real Vaughan (OSL)	1–2	Metro Lions (CPSL)	London, Ontario
8:38 ET	Rob Black 6'	(Report)	Aaron Benjamin 59'; Hayden Fitzwilliams 63'	Stadium: Cove Road Stadium

July 22, 2004	Vaughan Shooters (CPSL)	2–2 (a.e.t.) (1–3 p)	GS United (OSL)	Vaughan, Ontario
8:00 ET	Matthew Palleschi 3'; Joey Todaro 45'	(Report)	Phang Nguyen 26'; Shawn Long 88'	Stadium: The Soccer Centre

== Quarter-final ==
July 30, 2004	London City (CPSL)	4–5	Windsor Border Stars (CPSL)	London, Ontario
8:38 ET	Eris Tafaj; Kadian Lecky; Erik Elmauer; Paul Munster	(Report)	Aaron Byrd; Aaron Byrd; Josh Back; Tati Errecalde; Steve Wonsch	Stadium: Cove Road Stadium

July 31, 2004	North York Astros (CPSL)	2–6	Ottawa St. Anthony Italia (OCSL)	Kitchener, Ontario
8:00 ET	Alex Braletic; Alex Braletic	(Report)	Abraham Osman; Abraham Osman; Richard Furano; Huffman Eja-Tabe	Stadium: Centennial Stadium

August 1, 2004	Capital City Ambassadors (OCSL)	2–1	G.S. United (OSL)	London, Ontario
5:00 ET	Justin Dasah 8'; Justin Dasah 12'	(Report)	Peter Firebrace 43'	Stadium: Cove Road Stadium

August 1, 2004	AEK London (WOSL)	1–2	Metro Lions (CPSL)	London, Ontario
8:38 ET	Martin Painter 85'	(Report)	Hayden Fitzwilliams 23'; Hayden Fitzwilliams 25'	Stadium: Cove Road Stadium

== Wild Card Game ==
September 3, 2004	London City (CPSL)	1–2	Metro Lions (CPSL)	London, Ontario
8:38 ET	Tonino Commisso 79'	(Report)	Gabriel Pop 28'; Maxim Dorneval 77'	Stadium: Cove Road Stadium

== Semi-final ==
September 5, 2004	Windsor Border Stars (CPSL)	5–1	Capital City Ambassadors (OCSL)	London, Ontario
5:18 ET	Tati Errecalde 35'; Steve Wonsch 42'; Jeremy Harkins 82'; Tati Errecalde 85'; Mike Vonella 89'	(Report)	Sa Brahima Traore 30'	Stadium: Cove Road Stadium; Attendance: 100; Referee: Michael Reikhan (Ontario)

September 5, 2004	Metro Lions (CPSL)	1–3	Ottawa St. Anthony Italia (OCSL)	London, Ontario
8:18 ET	Kareem Reynolds 72'	(Report)	Allan Popazzi 40'; Huffman Eja-Tabe 69'; Abraham Osman 86'	Stadium: Cove Road Stadium; Attendance: 75; Referee: Mike Lambert (Ontario)

== Final ==
September 6
3:08 ET

Ottawa St. Anthony Italia	1–1	Windsor Border Stars
Edgar Soglo 11'	Report	Tati Errecalde 25'
Penalties
Johnny Schieda (penalty missed); Marc Labrom (penalty scored); Abraham Osman (penalty scored); Huffman Eja-Tabe (penalty scored); Richard Furano (penalty missed)	3 – 4	Tati Errecalde (penalty scored); Aaron Byrd (penalty scored); John Roma (penalty scored); Filip Rocca (penalty scored)

Cove Road Stadium, London, Ontario
Attendance: 120
Referee: Alex William (Ontario)

GK	1	(Canada) Angus Wong
RB	6	(Canada) Marc Labrom
CB	14	(Canada) Russell Shaw
CB	7	(Canada) Christian Hoefler
LB	5	(Canada) Allessandro Battisti	(substituted off) 31'
RM	23	(Cameroon) Huffman Eja-Tabe
CM	17	(Burkina Faso) Urbain Some (c)
CM	2	(Canada) Richard Furano
LM	12	(Canada) Edgar Soglo	(substituted off) 70'
CF	9	(Uganda) Abraham Osman
CF	20	(Canada) Allan Popazzi	(substituted off) 61'
Substitutes:
DF	4	(Canada) David Giamerandino	(substituted on) 31'
MF	8	(Cameroon) Alain Njima
ST	10	(Canada) Johnny Schieda	(substituted on) 61'
MF	13	(Canada) Jimmy Zito
MF	16	(Canada) Claudio Venegas
ST	18	(Canada) Nicolas Schleda
DF	19	(Canada) Mike Circelli
FW	21	(Canada) Jason Frederick	(substituted on) 70'
Manager:
(Canada) Aldo Popazzi

GK	23	(United States) Alan Placek	(substituted off) 118'
RB	33	(Canada) Justin Marshall
CB	4	(Canada) Filip Rocca
CB	5	(Canada) Scott Patriquin
LB	19	(Canada) Mike Vonella
RM	17	(Canada) Dave Dwaihy	(substituted off) 68'
CM	7	(Canada) Jeff Hodgson (c)
CM	10	(Argentina) Tati Errecalde
LM	11	(United States) Jeremy Harkins
ST	15	(United States) Steve Wonsch	(substituted off) 45'
ST	9	(United States) Aaron Byrd	(substituted off) 66'
Substitutes:
GK	1	(United States) Anthony Santili	(substituted on) 118'
MF	2	(Canada) Dan Zalenski	(substituted on) 66'
FW	6	(Canada) Mike Perica
MF	14	(Canada) JJ Dowhan
MF	16	(Canada) Dan Kolic	(substituted on) 68'
FW	18	(Canada) John Roma	(substituted on) 45'
Manager:
(England) Pat Hilton

Assistant referees:
Yakov Kheimach
John Oliva
Fourth official:
Tamara Reisma

== Top scorers ==
Position	Player	Club	Goals
1	Tati Errecalde	Windsor Border Stars	4
2	Alex Braletic	North York Astros	3
	Huffman Eja-Tabe	Ottawa St. Anthony Italia	3
	Hayden Fitzwilliams	Metro Lions	3
	Abraham Osman	Ottawa St. Anthony Italia	3
	Martin Painter	AEK London	3
