= 2005 Open Canada Cup =

Tournament details
- Country: Canada
- Teams: 19

Final positions
- Champions: Windsor Border Stars (2nd title)
- Runners-up: London City

Tournament statistics
- Matches played: 18
- Goals scored: 75 (4.17 per match)
- Top goal scorer: (United States) Aaron Byrd (4 goals)

The 2005 Open Canada Cup was the 8th edition of the Canadian Professional Soccer League's open league cup tournament, running from late May through early September. Windsor Border Stars defeated London City 3-0 in the final played at Cove Road Stadium, London, Ontario. The victory marked Windsor's second Open Canada Cup title and became the third club in the tournament's history to successfully defend its title. The tournament featured several clubs from the Ontario League and saw the return of several clubs from the Ottawa-Carleton Soccer League. Particularly the 2004 Open Canada Cup runners-up, Ottawa St. Anthony Italia, and 2004 Canadian National Challenge Cup finalists and Ontario Cup champions, the Ottawa Royals S.C.

The Ontario amateur clubs began the tournament in the preliminary rounds, while the CPSL clubs received an automatic bye to the second round. For the fourth straight year, London City was granted the hosting rights to the finals. All CPSL clubs competed in the competition except for Toronto Croatia, which opted out to compete in the annual Croatian-North American Soccer Tournament.

== Qualification ==
| Enter in preliminary round | Enter in Second Round |
| OSL/OCSL/WOSL; 3 teams/3 teams/2 teams | CPSL; 11 teams |
| Ontario Soccer League: Benfica Toronto; Hearts S.C.; Inter Oshawa; Ottawa Carleton Soccer League: Capital City Ambassadors; Ottawa Royals S.C.; Ottawa St. Anthony Italia; Western Ontario Soccer League: AEK London; London Portuguese | Canadian Professional Soccer League: Brampton Stallions; Durham Storm; Hamilton Thunder; Laval Dynamites; London City; North York Astros; Oakville Blue Devils; St. Catharines Wolves; Toronto Supra; Vaughan Shooters; Windsor Border Stars |

== First round ==
| May 22, 2005 | Ottawa St. Anthony Italia (OCSL) | 2–1 | Hearts S.C. (OSL) | London, Ontario |
| | Abraham Osman 36'; Abraham Osman 52' | (Report) | Gil Vainshtein 31' | Stadium: Cove Road Stadium |

| May 22, 2005 | Ottawa Royals (OCSL) | 2–1 | London Portuguese (WOSL) | London, Ontario |
| | Dan Cheney 47'; Dan Cheney 78' | (Report) | Paul Ferreira 61' | Stadium: Cove Road Stadium |

| May 23, 2005 | Capital City Ambassadors (OCSL) | 0–6 | Toronto Benfica (OSL) | London, Ontario |
| 3:00 ET | | (Report) | Christopher Santos 37'; Christopher Santos 60'; Christopher Santos 82'; Dean Campbell 71'; Fred Perreira 87' | Stadium: Cove Road Stadium |

| May 23, 2005 | AEK London (WOSL) | 2–0 | Inter Oshawa (OSL) | London, Ontario |
| 7:00 ET | Aldo D'Oria 37'; Mark Magier 71' | (Report) | ' | Stadium: Cove Road Stadium |

== Second round ==
| July 1, 2005 | Ottawa St. Anthony Italia (OCSL) | 0–1 | Laval Dynamites (CPSL) | Ottawa, Ontario |
| 1:00 ET | | (Report) | Radek Majkowski 90' | Stadium: Terry Fox Stadium |

| July 1, 2005 | Durham Storm (CPSL) | 0–1 | Ottawa Royals (OCSL) | Ottawa, Ontario |
| 3:30 ET | | (Report) | Dan Chaney 76' | Stadium: Terry Fox Stadium |

| July 1, 2005 | London City (CPSL) | 3–1 | Oakville Blue Devils (CPSL) | London, Ontario |
| 8:38 ET | Miguel Knox 8'; Tafaj 53', 72' | (Report) | Igor Prostran | Stadium: Cove Road Stadium |

| July 3, 2005 | North York Astros (CPSL) | 1–2 | Brampton Stallions (CPSL) | North York, Toronto |
| 5:45 ET | Lucas Alzate 80' | (Report) | Hugo Herrera 8'; Mladen Dikic | Stadium: Esther Shiner Stadium; Attendance: 120; Referee: Yakov Kheimach (Ontario) |

| July 3, 2005 | AEK London (WOSL) | 1–1 (a.e.t.) (5–2 p) | Hamilton Thunder (CPSL) | London, Ontario |
| 7:00 ET | Weston Van Der Linde 62' | (Report) | Ian Bennett 30' | Stadium: Cove Road Stadium |

| July 3, 2005 | St. Catharines Wolves (CPSL) | 1–4 | Toronto Benfica (OSL) | St. Catharines, Ontario |
| 7:30 ET | Petar Kus 73' | (Report) | Fred Pereira 21'; Philipe Silva 46'; Samuel Afryie 62'; Uarlem Castro 76' | Stadium: Club Roma Stadium |

| July 4, 2005 | Vaughan Shooters (CPSL) | 1–0 | Toronto Supra (CPSL) | Brockton Village, Toronto |
| 8:30 ET | Jason De Thomasis 91' | (Report) | | Stadium: Brockton Stadium; Attendance: 150; Referee: Calin Pintea |

== Quarter-final ==
| July 30, 2005 | Windsor Border Stars (CPSL) | 1–1 (a.e.t.) (7–6 p) | AEK London (WOSL) | Windsor, Ontario |
| 7:00 ET | Tino Scicluna 53' | (Report) | Kyle Cornet 11' | Stadium: Windsor Stadium |

| July 31, 2005 | Vaughan Shooters (CPSL) | 3–1 | Toronto Benfica (OSL) | Vaughan, Ontario |
| 6:00 ET | Frankie Bruno 16'; Sean Myers 43'; Jason De Thomasis 57' | (Report) | Fred Pereira 45' | Stadium: The Soccer Centre; Referee: Steve DePierro (Ontario) |

| August 1, 2005 | Laval Dynamites (CPSL) | 1–1 (a.e.t.) (5–4 p) | Ottawa Royals (OCSL) | Laval, Quebec |
| 8:00 ET | Tjeega Tchounkoe | (Report) | Sylvan Cloutier | Stadium: Centre Sportif Bois-de-Boulogne |

| August 1, 2005 | London City (CPSL) | 2–0 | Brampton Stallions (CPSL) | London, Ontario |
| 7:38 ET | Robbie Della-Croce 34'; Karim Ben Sari 35' | (Report) | | Stadium: Cove Road Stadium |

== Semi-final ==
| September 4, 2005 | Laval Dynamites (CPSL) | 0–5 | Windsor Border Stars (CPSL) | London, Ontario |
| 3:38 ET | | (Report) | Aaron Byrd 27'; Aaron Byrd 32'; Tati Errecalde 57'; Radek Papiez 59'; Aaron Byrd 72' | Stadium: Cove Road Stadium; Attendance: 100; Referee: Giovanni Oliviera (Ontario) |

| September 4, 2005 | London City (CPSL) | 3–2 (a.e.t.) | Vaughan Shooters (CPSL) | London, Ontario |
| 7:38 ET | Miguel Knox 38'; Dennis Peeters 63'; Keith Andrew 120' | (Report) | Stalin Cardenas 34'; Jason De Thomasis 47' | Stadium: Cove Road Stadium; Attendance: 150; Referee: Vito Curalli (Ontario) |

== Final ==
| September 5, 2005 | London City (CPSL) | 0–3 | Windsor Border Stars (CPSL) | London, Ontario |
| 4:08 ET | | (Report) | Radek Papiez 49'; Radek Papiez 51'; Aaron Byrd 82' | Stadium: Cove Road Stadium |

== Top scorers ==
| Position | Player | Club | Goals |
|---|---|---|---|
| 1 | Aaron Byrd | Windsor Border Stars | 4 |
| 2 | Dan Cheney | Ottawa Royals | 3 |
| | Jason De Thomasis | Vaughan Shooters | 3 |
| | Radek Papiez | Windsor Border Stars | 3 |
| | Fred Perreira | Toronto Benfica | 3 |
| | Christopher Santos | Toronto Benfica | 3 |
