= Tripolitania (disambiguation) =

Tripolitania is an historic region of Libya.

Tripolitania may also refer to:

- Tripolitania (Roman province)
- Islamic Tripolitania and Cyrenaica
- Ottoman Tripolitania
- Tripolitanian Republic
- Italian Tripolitania
- Tripolitania (province of Libya)

== Disambiguation ==
- Tripoli (disambiguation)
