= Raid of Sant Antioco =

Raid of Sant'Antioco
Date	October 16, 1815
Location	Sant'Antioco, Sardinia
Result	Tunisian Victory

Belligerents
Beylik of Tunis	Kingdom of Sardinia (1720–1861)

Commanders and leaders
Rais Sidi Abzunama	Elfisio Melis Alagna †; Raimondo Bruscu

Strength
1200 corsairs 17 ships	Unknown

Casualties and losses
400 corsairs killed	12 wounded soldiers All the rest are taken prisoner

== The Raid ==
On 16 October 1815, the Tunisian fleet landed at Is Pruinis beach on Sant'Antioco. The fleet consisted of three frigate, three gabars, three brigantine, three xebec, and six other vessels, commanded by a Sardinian named Ranieri or Rais Sidi Abzunama.

After seven hours of fierce fighting, the Tunisians found a way into the town by climbing onto a house, from which they gained access through a window overlooking the troops of Elfisio Melis Alagna. He was killed by a shot fired by the Tunisian corsairs. The Tunisians then entered the town, destroyed the fort, and captured 157 prisoners, including the commander's sister, Angelica Melis Alagna. They subsequently returned to Tunis with a large amount of booty and all of their prisoners.

Eventually, a force of 500 militia troops from the Kingdom of Sardinia, commanded by Don Agostino Salazar, set out from the city of Iglesias. However, they arrived only after the attack had ended, by which time the Tunisian corsairs had already departed.

== Aftermath ==
The Tunisian attack on Sant'Antioco in 1815 contributed significantly to the treaties concluded in 1816 between the regencies of Tripoli, Algiers, and Tunis and the Kingdom of Sardinia and the Kingdom of Naples. These treaties helped revive diplomatic relations across the Mediterranean.

Furthermore, this attack was one of the last Tunisian raids against Sardinia. One year later, in 1816, following the treaties, 800 Sardinian and Neapolitan captives were released. These treaties marked the end of Tunisian raids on Sardinia.

== Sources ==
- Lai, Roberto (2010). Annali 2010-Comune di Sant'Antioco (in Italian).
- Pois, Francisco (1981). Torri spagnole e forti piemontesi in Sardegna (in French).
- Tore, Gianfranco (2024). "Sardegna e Tunisia un rapporto di lunga durata". Museo Archeologico Nazionale di Cagliari. Museo Archeologico Nazionale di Cagliari.
- Triulzi, Alessandro (1971). Italian-speaking communities in early nineteenth century Tunis.
