= Tripoli Lake =

Tripoli Lake may refer to:

== Lakes ==
In Canada:

- In Ontario:
  - Tripoli Lake (Algoma District)
  - Tripoli Lake (Kenora District, Ontario)

== See also ==
- West Tripoli Lake (Ontario)
