= 2005 Canada Cup =

Canada Cup 2005 or 2005 Canada Cup may refer to:

- 2005 Canada Cup of Curling, Canadian curling bonspiel, also serving as an Olympics trials qualifier
- 2005 Canada Cup (rugby union), international women's rugby union tournament
- 2005 Canada Cup International Softball Championship
- 2004 Canada Cup (floorball), international open floorball tournament

== See also ==
- 2005 Open Canada Cup, Canadian men's soccer tournament
- 2005 in sport
- 2005 in Canada
- Canada Cup (disambiguation)
