= Kabiskagami Lake =

Lake in Ontario, Canada

- Location within Ontario
- Location: Algoma District, Ontario
- Coordinates: 48°41′35″N 84°33′53″W
- Primary outflows: Unnamed creek to Mosambik Lake
- Basin countries: Canada
- Max. length: 2.8 km (1.7 mi)
- Max. width: 0.8 km (0.50 mi)
- Surface elevation: 358 m (1,175 ft)

Kabiskagami Lake is a lake in the Lake Superior drainage basin in Algoma District, Ontario, Canada. It is about 2.8 kilometres (1.7 mi) long and 0.8 kilometres (0.5 mi) wide and lies at an elevation of 358 metres (1,175 ft). The primary outflow is an unnamed creek to Mosambik Lake on the Magpie River, which flows into Lake Superior.

== See also ==
- List of lakes in Ontario
