= Tri-Cities =

Tri-Cities most often refers to:

- Tri-Cities (Tennessee–Virginia), consisting of the three cities of Bristol, Kingsport, and Johnson City
- Tri-Cities, Washington, consisting of Richland, Pasco, and Kennewick
  - Tri-Cities metropolitan area, metropolitan area centered on the Tri-Cities in Washington

Tri-City, Tricity or Tri-Cities may also refer to:

== Populated places ==
=== Americas ===
==== Canada ====
- Tri-Cities (British Columbia), consisting of Coquitlam, Port Coquitlam, and Port Moody, located in the north-eastern section of Metro Vancouver
- Tri-Cities (Ontario), consisting of Kitchener, Cambridge, and Waterloo

==== United States ====
- In California:
  - Tri-Cities in Los Angeles County, California, refers to the Burbank, Glendale, and Pasadena area, particularly in the local real estate industry.
  - Tri-City, San Diego County, California, Oceanside, Vista, and Carlsbad.
  - Tri-City area in the San Francisco Bay Area refers to the three neighboring cities Fremont, Newark, and Union City.
    - not to be confused with the Tri-Valley area of Dublin, Livermore, Pleasanton and San Ramon.
- Tri-Cities, Illinois, in Kane County, Illinois, the county seat of Geneva and the nearby cities of Batavia, and St. Charles.
- In Michigan: Tri-Cities, Michigan, consisting of Bay City, Saginaw and Midland in the Saginaw Valley
- Tri-Cities, Nebraska in the south-central part of the state, Grand Island, Kearney, and Hastings
- In New York:
  - Capital District, New York, consisting of Albany, Schenectady, and Troy
  - Triple Cities, Binghamton, Endicott and Johnson City
- In North Carolina:
  - Piedmont Triad in North Carolina, consisting of Greensboro, Winston-Salem, and High Point
  - Research Triangle in North Carolina, consisting of Raleigh, Durham, and Chapel Hill
- Tri-City, Oregon, a census-designated place (CDP) and unincorporated community in Douglas County, Oregon, United States, named for 3 cities: Myrtle Creek, Canyonville and Riddle
- Lehigh Valley in Pennsylvania: Allentown, Bethlehem, and Easton
- In Texas:
  - The Golden Triangle, consisting of Beaumont, Port Arthur, and Orange
  - Historical name for Baytown before it was formed in 1948 by consolidation of the unincorporated communities of Goose Creek, Pelly and East Baytown
- In Virginia:
  - Historic Triangle, three historic colonial communities on the Virginia Peninsula, namely Jamestown, Williamsburg, and Yorktown
  - Tri-Cities, Virginia, consisting of Petersburg, Colonial Heights, and Hopewell in the Greater Richmond Region

=== Asia ===
==== India ====
- Chandigarh Tricity, consisting of Chandigarh, Panchkula and Mohali.
- Mumbai Metropolitan Area, consisting of Mumbai, Navi Mumbai and Thane.
- Noida Ghaziabad Tricity, consisting of Noida, Greater Noida and Ghaziabad.
- Bhilai-Raipur-Atal Nagar Tricity, consists of Bhilai, Raipur and Naya Raipur.
- Ahmedabad Metropolitan area, consists of Ahmedabad, Gandhinagar and GIFT City.
- Udupi Tri-City, consisting of Udupi, Manipal and Malpe
- Warangal Tri-City, consisting of Warangal, Hanamkonda, and Kazipet.
- Chennai Metropolitan Area, consisting of Chennai, Avadi and Tambaram
- Ranipet Tri-City, consisting of Ranipet, Walajapet and Arcot.
- Amaravati Tri-City, consisting of Amaravati, Vijayawada and Guntur.

==== Nepal ====
- Tricity, Nepal, consisting of the cities of Baglung, Beni and Kusma

==== Saudi Arabia ====
- Dammam metropolitan area, consisting of Dhahran, Dammam and Khobar in Saudi Arabia

==== United Arab Emirates ====
- Dubai-Sharjah-Ajman metropolitan area, consisting of Dubai, Ajman and Sharjah

=== Europe ===
==== Denmark ====
- Triangle Region (Denmark) – Kolding, Vejle and Frederica (Danish: trekantsområde)

==== Poland ====
- Tricity, Poland consisting of Gdańsk, Gdynia and Sopot
  - Little Kashubian Tricity consisting of Wejherowo, Rumia and Reda

==== Sweden ====
- Trollhättan, Uddevalla and Vänersborg are called Tri-city (Swedish: Trestad) as a combination

==== Switzerland-Germany-France ====
- Dreyeckland – Basel (Switzerland), Weil am Rhein (Germany) and St.Louis (France)

==== Ukraine ====
- Sievierodonetsk, Lysychansk and Rubizhne are called Tri-city (Ukrainian: Troye-grad) as a combination

==== United Kingdom ====
- West Yorkshire Urban Area, the cities of Wakefield, Leeds and Bradford

== Sports ==
- Tri-Cities Blackhawks, former name of the Atlanta Hawks from 1946 to 1951
- Tri-City Americans, an ice hockey team in Kennewick, Washington.
- Tri-City Dust Devils, a minor league baseball team in Pasco, Washington, United States.
- Tri-City ValleyCats, a minor league baseball team in Troy, New York
- Tri-City Chili Peppers, a collegiate summer baseball team in Colonial Heights, Virginia.

== Other uses ==
- Tri-City News, community newspaper for British Columbia's Lower Mainland
- Tri-City, the fictional setting of the computer game Need for Speed: Undercover
- Tricity Bendix, a brand of electrical appliances owned by Electrolux
- Yamaha Tricity, a tilting three-wheeled motor scooter

== See also ==
- Quad Cities
- Tripoli (disambiguation)
- Three Towns
- Twin cities
- Twin city (disambiguation)
