= Tripoli Lake (Algoma District) =

Lake in Ontario, Canada

- Location within Ontario
- Location: Algoma District, Ontario
- Coordinates: 48°28′33″N 84°47′52″W
- Primary inflows: Unnamed creek from West Tripoli Lake
- Primary outflows: Unnamed creek to Tripoli Creek
- Basin countries: Canada
- Max. length: 2.1 km (1.3 mi)
- Max. width: 0.9 km (0.56 mi)
- Surface elevation: 422 m (1,385 ft)

Tripoli Lake is located within the Lake Superior drainage basin in Algoma District, northeastern Ontario, Canada. It is about 2.1 kilometres (1.3 mi) long and 0.9 kilometres (0.6 mi) wide and lies at an elevation of 422 metres (1,385 ft). The Canadian Pacific Railway transcontinental main line passes at the southwest tip of the lake.

The primary inflow is an unnamed creek from West Tripoli Lake, and the primary outflow is an unnamed creek to Tripoli Creek, which flows via the Magpie River into Lake Superior.

== See also ==
- List of lakes in Ontario
