= Antiochus of Sulcis =

Saint Antiochus
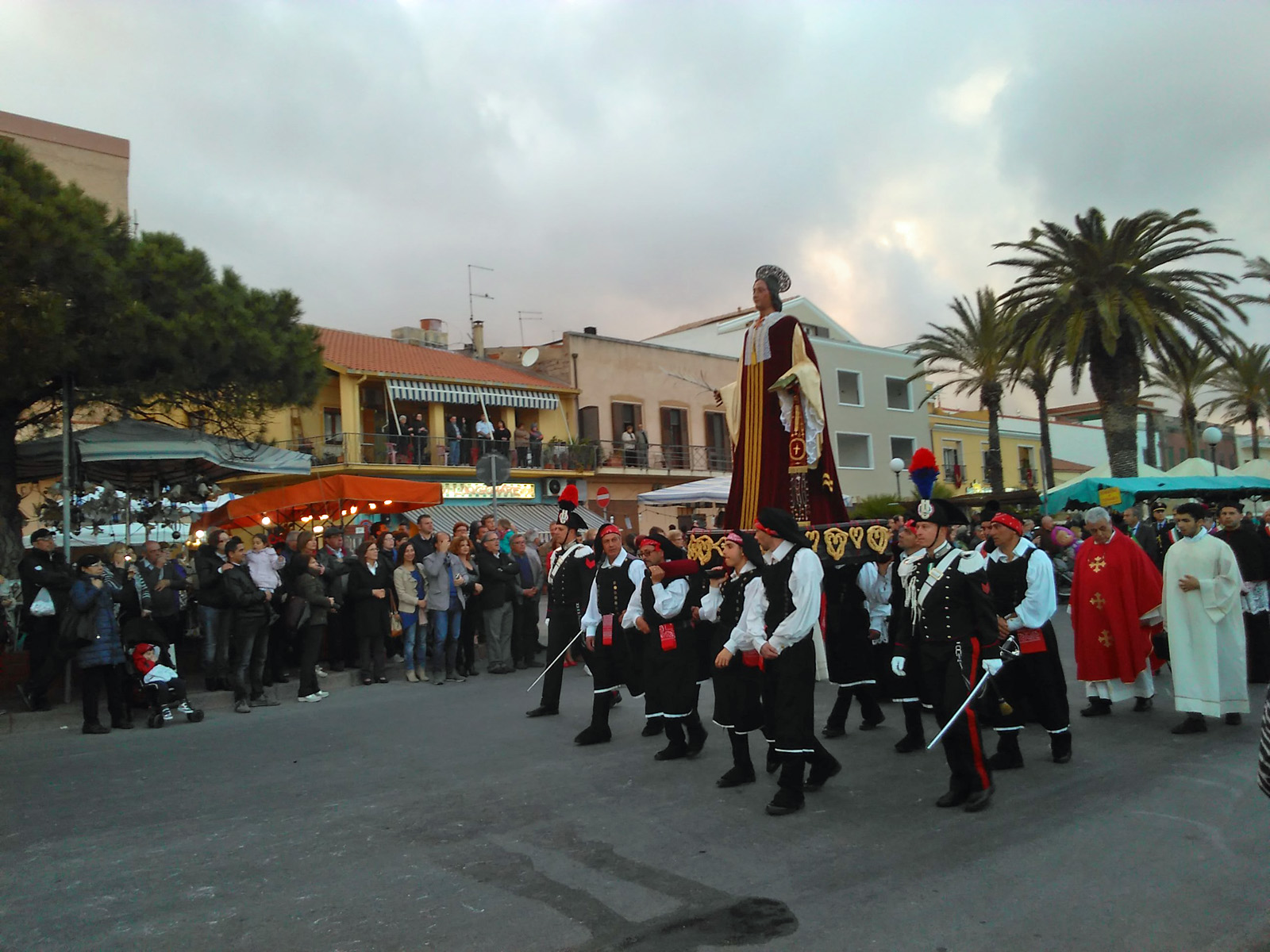
- Procession of Saint Antiochus in Sant'Antioco

Martyr
- Born: 1st century Mauretania or Sebastea, Cappadocia (modern-day Sivas, Turkey)
- Died: c. 127 AD; Sulcis, Roman Sardinia (modern-day Italy)
- Venerated in: Roman Catholic Church; Eastern Orthodox Church
- Major shrine: Basilica di Sant'Antioco
- Feast: December 13 (Catholicism); July 16 (Orthodoxy)
- Attributes: Palm of martyrdom
- Patronage: Sant'Antioco, Sardinia

Antiochus of Sulcis (died c. 127 AD) was an early Christian martyr of Sardinia. The island and town of Sant'Antioco are named after him.

== History and legend ==
Antiochus is a figure associated with the Sardinian mines from which the Romans extracted minerals and precious metals; the Romans condemned prisoners of war and Christians to work these mines.

His legend states that he was a physician during the reign of Hadrian. He had converted many people in Cappadocia and Galatia to the Christian religion, and was therefore tortured and sent into exile by the authorities. Antiochus was condemned to work the mines on the island that now bears his name. The island, inhospitable and isolated during this period, was named Plumbaria at the time, after its source of lead (plumbum). Antiochus, however, converted his jailer Cyriacus in Sardinia, and had built a small underground oratory on Plumbaria, and was thus condemned to death there.

== Veneration ==
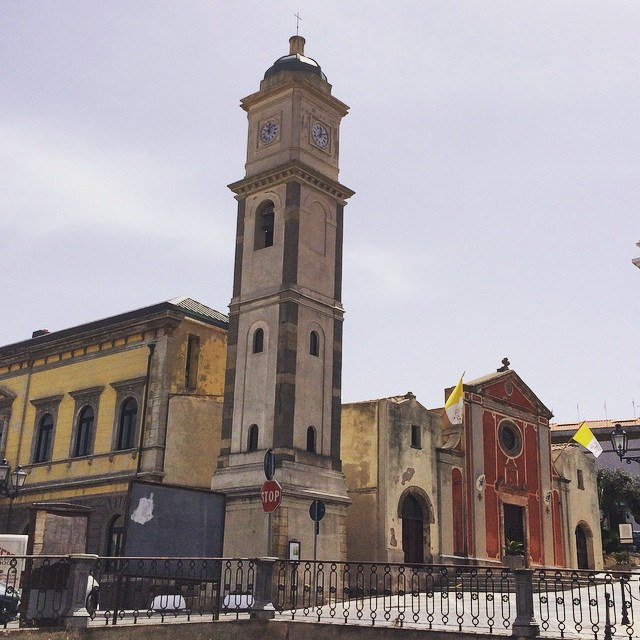
Basilica di Sant'Antioco Martire

Some sources state that he was martyred with Cyriacus at Sebaste rather than at Sardinia. The Martyrologium Romanum places the martyrdom "around the 4th century". The church in the island capital Sant'Antioco, named after Antiochus, was dedicated to him in the 5th century; Antiochus' tomb was in the catacomb beneath it.

== Bibliography ==
- Onnis, Omar; Mureddu, Manuelle (2019). Illustres. Vita, morte e miracoli di quaranta personalità sarde (in Italian). Sestu: Domus de Janas. ISBN 978-88-97084-90-7. OCLC 1124656644.
