= Esnagi Lake =

Lake in Algoma District, Ontario, Canada

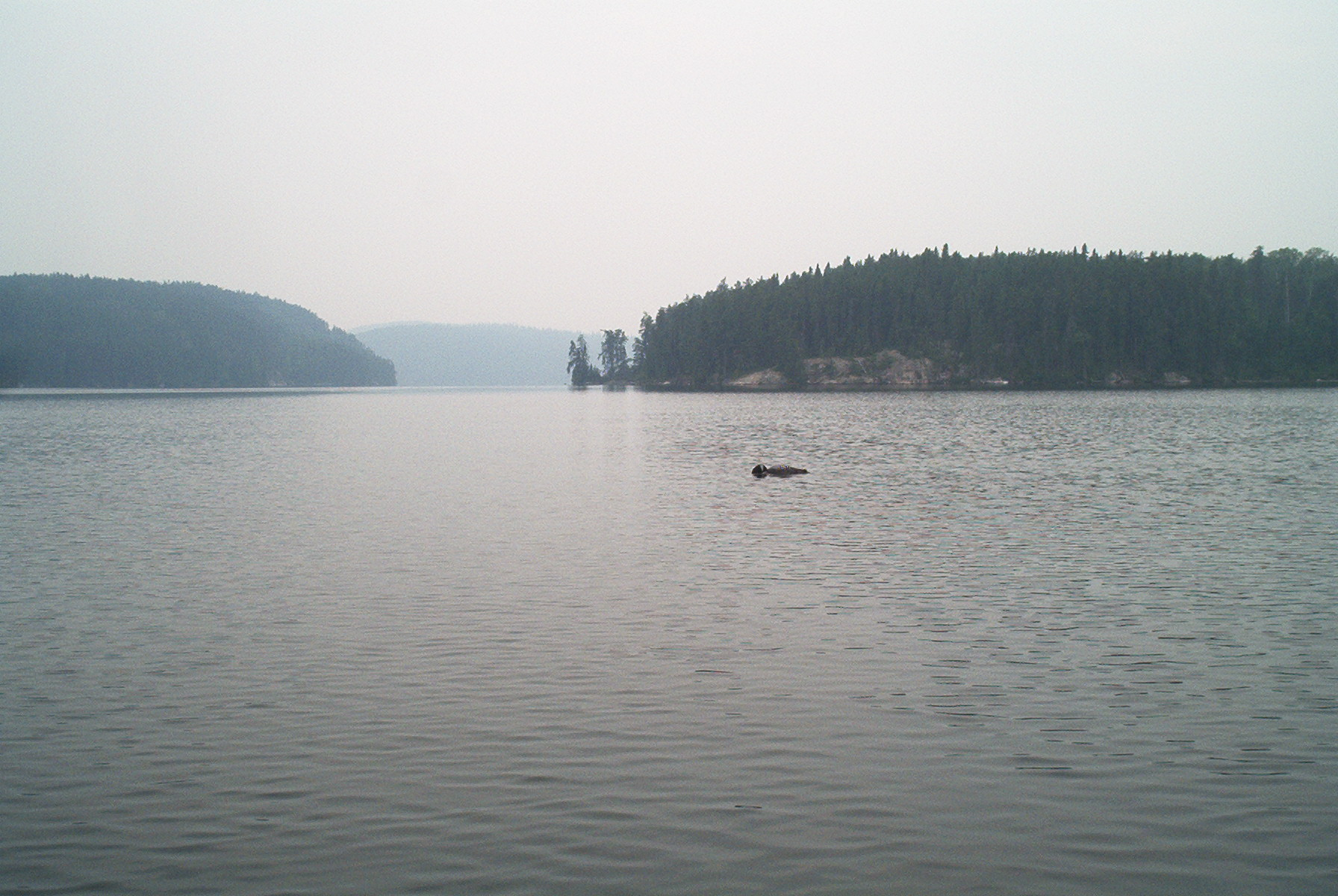
- Common loon on Esnagi Lake

- Location in Ontario
- Location: Algoma District, Ontario
- Coordinates: 48°36′58″N 84°30′21″W
- Part of: Great Lakes Basin
- Primary inflows: Magpie River, Tripoli Creek
- Primary outflows: Magpie River
- Basin countries: Canada
- Max. length: 45 km (28 mi)
- Max. width: 5 km (3.1 mi)
- Surface elevation: 344 m (1,129 ft)

Esnagi Lake is a large V-shaped lake in the Unorganized North part of Algoma District, Ontario, Canada. Part of the Great Lakes Basin, it is about 45 kilometres (28 mi) long and 5.0 kilometres (3.1 mi) wide and lies at an elevation of 344 metres (1,129 ft), with the "V" on its side and the apex facing west. The primary inflows are the Magpie River from Mosambik Lake at the north end of the lake, Tripoli Creek on the west side, and other unnamed creeks. The primary outflow is also the Magpie River, which flows downstream from the south end of the lake at the east switch of the siding at Swanson on the Canadian Pacific Railway transcontinental mainline, and eventually into Lake Superior.

The lake is home to three fishing lodges, two outpost cottages and two private cottages accessible only by rail or float plane. It has fish species such as walleye, northern pike, perch and whitefish and made Fish'n Canada's top ten list of Canadian fishing destinations.

== See also ==
- List of lakes in Ontario
