= Bombardment of Tripoli =

Bombardments of Tripoli may refer to:

- Tripoli, Lebanon:
  - Fall of Tripoli (1289)
- Tripoli, Libya
  - Siege of Tripoli (1551)
  - Bombardment of Tripoli (1728) - by Grandpré's French Navy squadron from 20–26 July 1728.
  - First Barbary War (1804)
  - Aerial bombardment during the Italo-Turkish War (1911)
  - 1986 United States bombing of Libya

== See also ==
- Bombing of Libya (disambiguation)
