= North Wejinabikun Lake (Ontario) =

Lake in Algoma District, Ontario, Canada

- Location within Ontario
- Location: Algoma District, Ontario
- Coordinates: 48°42′16″N 84°34′58″W
- Primary inflows: Magpie River
- Primary outflows: Magpie River
- Basin countries: Canada
- Max. length: 1.5 km (0.93 mi)
- Max. width: 0.7 km (0.43 mi)
- Surface elevation: 358 m (1,175 ft)

North Wejinabikun Lake is a lake in the Lake Superior drainage basin in Algoma District, Ontario, Canada. It is about 1.5 kilometres (0.9 mi) long and 0.7 kilometres (0.4 mi) wide and lies at an elevation of 358 metres (1,175 ft). The primary inflow is the Magpie River from Wejinabikun Lake, and the primary outflow is the same river, which flows downstream towards Mosambik Lake, and eventually into Lake Superior.

== See also ==
- List of lakes in Ontario
