= Catfish Creek (Ontario) =

There are three creeks named Catfish Creek in Ontario, Canada:

- Catfish Creek in Algoma District, a tributary of the Magpie River that flows into Lake Superior at Wawa
- Catfish Creek (Lake Erie, Elgin) in Elgin County, that flows into Lake Erie at Port Bruce
- Catfish Creek (Lake Erie, Norfolk) in Norfolk County, a tributary of the Black Creek, which in turn flows into Lake Erie at Port Dover

== See also ==
- List of rivers of Ontario
