= Sant'Antioco bilingual =

Stone inscription in a Mediterranean island

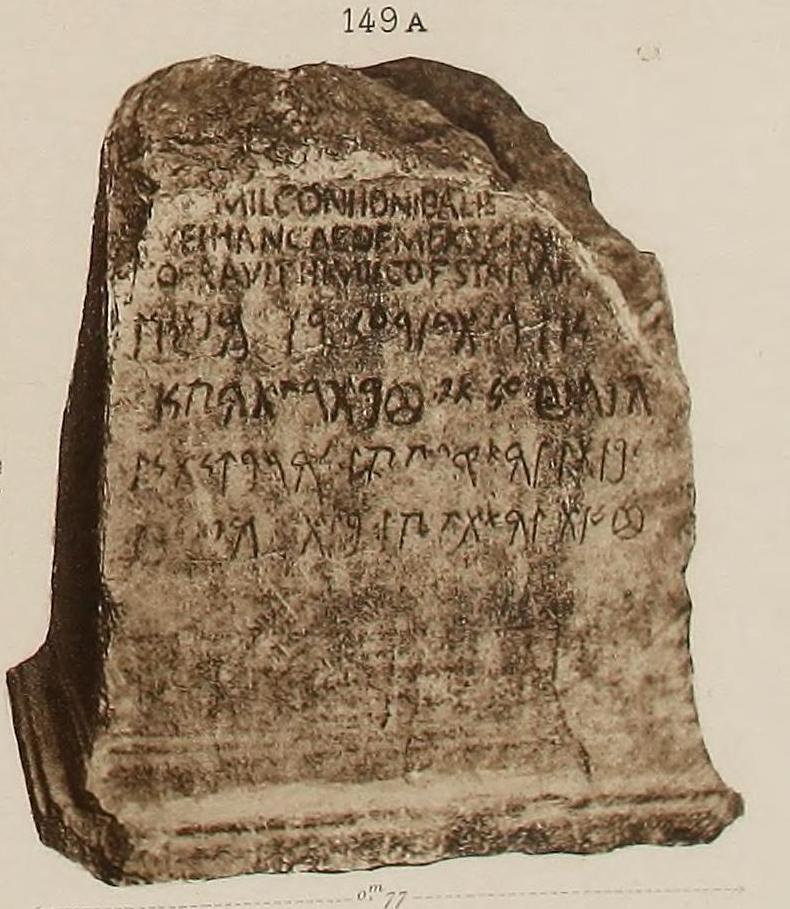
The inscription

The Sant'Antioco bilingual is a bilingual Latin-Punic inscription found in 1881 in Sant'Antioco, Sardinia. The inscription is on a large marble block 71 x 63 cm, with a hole at the top for a statue.

It was discovered by German epigrapher Johannes Schmidt, who was working in Sardinia on behalf of Theodor Mommsen and his Corpus Inscriptionum Latinarum. It was found in the courtyard of the house of Giuseppe Angius.

It is currently in the Museo archeologico comunale Ferruccio Barreca. The Punic inscription is known as KAI 172 and CIS I 149.
