= Tripoli Creek =

Tripoli Creek may refer to:

== Rivers ==
In Canada:

- In Ontario:
  - Tripoli Creek (Algoma District)
  - Tripoli Creek (Kenora District)
