= Wejinabikun Lake (Ontario) =

Lake in Algoma District, Ontario, Canada

- Location within Ontario
- Location: Algoma District, Ontario
- Coordinates: 48°41′34″N 84°35′57″W
- Primary inflows: Magpie River
- Primary outflows: Magpie River
- Basin countries: Canada
- Max. length: 2.0 km (1.2 mi)
- Max. width: 0.7 km (0.43 mi)
- Surface elevation: 362 m (1,188 ft)

Wejinabikun Lake is a lake in the Lake Superior drainage basin in Algoma District, Ontario, Canada. It is about 2.0 kilometres (1.2 mi) long and 0.7 kilometres (0.4 mi) wide and lies at an elevation of 362 metres (1,188 ft). The primary inflow and outflow is the Magpie River, which flows downstream into North Wejinabikun Lake, and eventually into Lake Superior.

== See also ==
- List of lakes in Ontario
