= Upper Magpie Lake (Ontario) =

Lake in Algoma District, Ontario, Canada

- Location in Ontario
- Location: Algoma District, Ontario
- Coordinates: 48°37′51″N 84°37′31″W
- Primary outflows: Magpie River
- Basin countries: Canada
- Max. length: 1.6 km (0.99 mi)
- Max. width: 0.6 km (0.37 mi)
- Surface elevation: 420 m (1,380 ft)

Upper Magpie Lake is a lake in geographic Doucett Township in the Unorganized North Part of Algoma District, Ontario, Canada. It is in the Lake Superior drainage basin and is the source of the Magpie River. The lake is about 1.6 kilometres (1.0 mi) long and 0.6 kilometres (0.4 mi) wide and lies at an elevation of 421 metres (1,381 ft). The primary outflow is the Magpie River which flows into Lake Superior.

== See also ==
- List of lakes in Ontario
