= West Tripoli Lake =

Lake in Algoma District, Ontario, Canada

- Location within Ontario
- Location: Algoma District, Ontario
- Coordinates: 48°27′43″N 84°50′29″W
- Primary outflows: Unnamed creek to Tripoli Lake
- Basin countries: Canada
- Max. length: 2.5 km (1.6 mi)
- Max. width: 0.6 km (0.37 mi)
- Surface elevation: 424 m (1,391 ft)

West Tripoli Lake is a lake in the Lake Superior drainage basin in Algoma District, northeastern Ontario, Canada. It is about 2.5 kilometres (1.6 mi) long and 0.6 kilometres (0.4 mi) wide and lies at an elevation of 424 metres (1,391 ft). The Canadian Pacific Railway transcontinental main line passes at the northeast tip of the lake.

The primary outflow is an unnamed creek to Tripoli Lake, which flows via the Tripoli Creek and the Magpie River into Lake Superior.

== See also ==
- List of lakes in Ontario
