= Mosambik Lake =

Lake in Algoma District, Ontario, Canada

- Location within Ontario
- Location: Algoma District, Ontario
- Coordinates: 48°41′19″N 84°31′44″W
- Primary inflows: Magpie River
- Primary outflows: Magpie River
- Basin countries: Canada
- Max. length: 5.9 km (3.7 mi)
- Max. width: 2.0 km (1.2 mi)
- Surface elevation: 347 m (1,138 ft)

Mosambik Lake is a lake in the Lake Superior drainage basin in Algoma District, Ontario, Canada. It is about 5.9 kilometres (3.7 mi) long and 2.0 kilometres (1.2 mi) wide and lies at an elevation of 347 metres (1,138 ft). The primary inflow is the Magpie River from North Wejinabikun Lake on the west side of the lake, and there are several unnamed creek inflows, including one from Kabiskagami Lake on the southwest side. The primary outflow is also the Magpie River, which flows downstream from the north end of the lake towards Esnagi Lake, and eventually into Lake Superior.

== See also ==
- List of lakes in Ontario
