= Tarablus =

Ṭarāblus or Ṭarābulus (Arabic: طرابلس) is the Arabic form of Tripoli (Greek: Τρίπολις), often transliterated into Turkish as Trablus, and may refer to:

- Tripoli, Libya, historically Ṭarābulus al-Gharb ("Western Tripoli")
  - Eyālet-i Trâblus Gârp (province, 1551–1864) of the Ottoman Empire, centered on the city
    - Vilâyet-i Trâblus Gârp, name of the province between 1864 and 1911
- Tripoli, Lebanon, historically Ṭarābulus al-Sham ("Levantine Tripoli")
  - Eyālet-i Trâblus Şam (province, 1579–1864) of the Ottoman Empire, centered on the city

== See also ==
- Tripoli (disambiguation)
