= Tino Scicluna =

American soccer player

Personal information
- Full name: Valentino Scicluna
- Place of birth: Redford, Michigan
- Position: Midfielder

Senior career*
Years	Team	Apps	(Gls)
1998	Indiana Blast	2	(0)
1998–2001	Detroit Rockers (indoor)	38	(3)
1999–2003	Mid-Michigan Bucks	95	(15)
2004–2005	Windsor Border Stars		
2008-2009	Detroit Ignition (indoor)	20	(9)
2012–	Waza Flo (indoor)		

Managerial career
- 2002–2009: Madonna University
- * Club domestic league appearances and goals

Tino Scicluna is an American soccer player currently playing with Waza Flo in the Major Arena Soccer League. He played in the USISL Pro League, National Professional Soccer League, USL Premier Development League, and the Canadian Professional Soccer League.

== Playing career ==
Scicluna began his professional career in 1998 with Indiana Blast in the USISL Pro League. In his debut season with Indiana, he helped secure a division title. At the conclusion of the USISL Pro League season he signed with Detroit Rockers of the National Professional Soccer League. He played with the organization for three seasons, and appeared in a total of 38 matches and recorded three goals. In 1999, he signed with Mid-Michigan Bucks of the USL Premier Development League. During his tenure with Michigan he won three division titles, and appeared in 95 matches and scored 15 goals. In 2004, he signed with newly formed Windsor Border Stars of the Canadian Professional Soccer League. He helped Windsor capture the Open Canada Cup, and qualify for the postseason. In 2015, he signed with Waza Flo of the Major Arena Soccer League, an organization founded by his brothers.

In 2002, Madonna University hired the services of Scicluna to coach the men's soccer team. On December 5, 2009, he announced his resignation after serving the club for seven seasons.
