= Tripoli Creek (Algoma District) =

Tripoli Creek ruisseau Tripoli
- Location of the mouth of Tripoli Creek in Ontario

Location
- Country: Canada
- Province: Ontario
- Region: Northeastern Ontario
- District: Algoma
- Part: Unorganized North

Physical characteristics
- Source: West Tripoli Lake
  - coordinates: 48°28′06″N 84°49′47″W
  - elevation: 424 m (1,391 ft)
- Mouth: Esnagi Lake
  - coordinates: 48°33′58″N 84°36′22″W
  - elevation: 347 m (1,138 ft)

Basin features
- River system: Lake Superior drainage basin
- Tributaries
  - right: Ryerson Creek

Tripoli Creek (French: ruisseau Tripoli) is a creek in the Unorganized North Part of Algoma District in northeastern Ontario, Canada. It is part of the Lake Superior drainage basin.

The creek begins at West Tripoli Lake at an elevation of 424 metres (1,391 ft). It heads northeast under the Canadian Pacific Railway transcontinental mainline between the settlements of Amyot to the west and the Girdwood railroad flag stop, 1.6 kilometres (1 mi) to the east, to reach Tripoli Lake. Tripoli Creek continues northeast, takes in the right tributary Ryerson Creek, and reaches its mouth at Esnagi Lake on the Magpie River at an elevation of 347 metres (1,138 ft).

== Tributaries ==
- Ryerson Creek (right)

== See also ==
- List of rivers of Ontario
