= Sant'Antioco =

Sant'Antioco Santu Antiogu (Sardinian)
- Comune
- Comune di Sant'Antioco
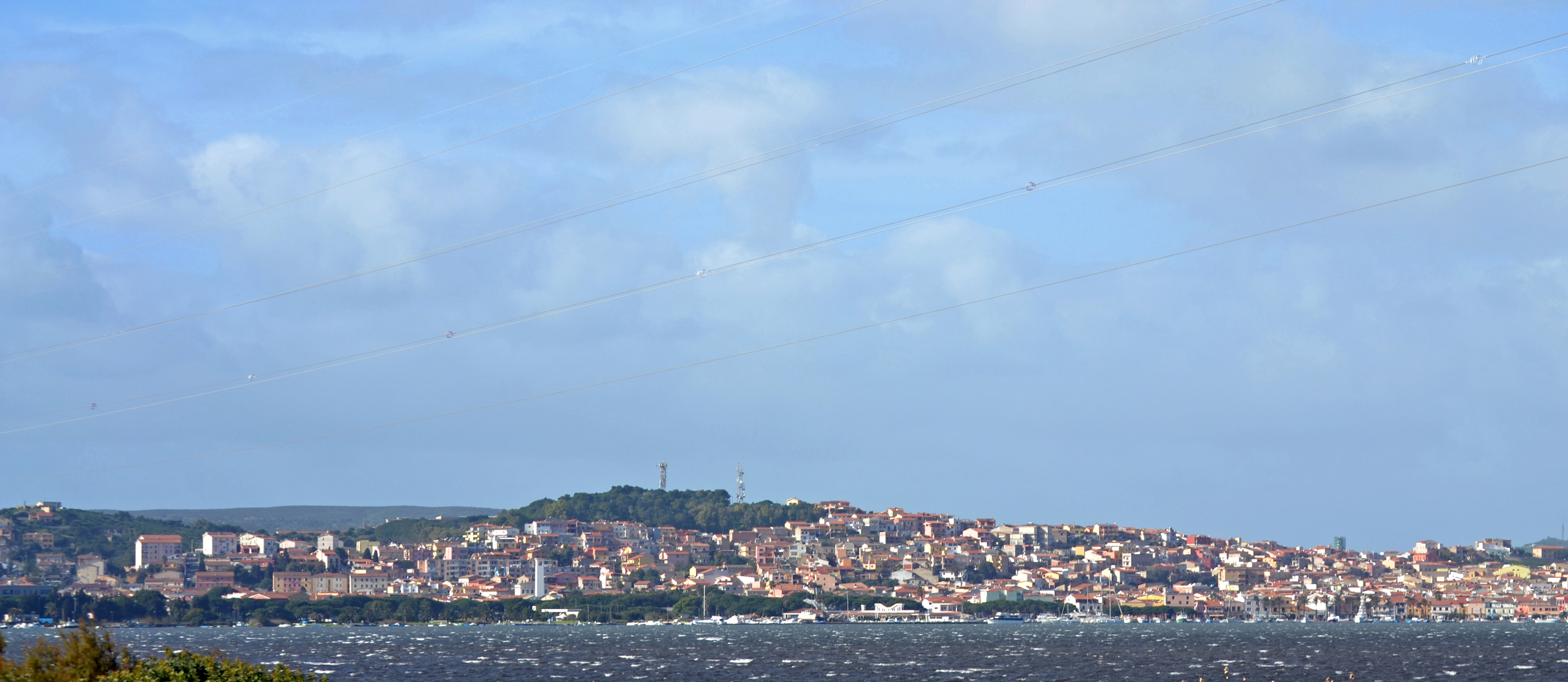
- Seafront of Sant'Antioco

- Coat of arms

- Location within Sardinia
- Coordinates: 39°02′06″N 08°24′45″E
- Country: Italy
- Region: Sardinia
- Province: Sulcis Iglesiente
- Frazioni: Maladroxia

Government
  - Mayor: Ignazio Locci (2017) (civic Party)

Area
  - Total: 87.90 km^{2} (33.94 sq mi)
- Elevation: 10 m (33 ft)

Population (2026)
  - Total: 10,404
  - Density: 118.4/km^{2} (306.6/sq mi)
- Demonym: Antiochensi
- Time zone: UTC+1 (CET)
  - Summer (DST): UTC+2 (CEST)
- Postal code: 09017
- Dialing code: 0781
- Patron saint: Saint Antiochus (Sant'Antioco)
- Website: Official website

Sant'Antioco (Italian pronunciation: [santanˈtiːoko]; Sardinian: Santu Antiogu) is a town and comune (municipality) on the island of the same name in the Province of Sulcis Iglesiente in the autonomous island region of Sardinia in Italy, in the Sulcis subregion. With a population of 10,404, Sant'Antioco is the larger of the island's two municipalities.

It is the site of ancient Sulci, considered the second city of Sardinia in antiquity.

== Island of Sant'Antioco ==
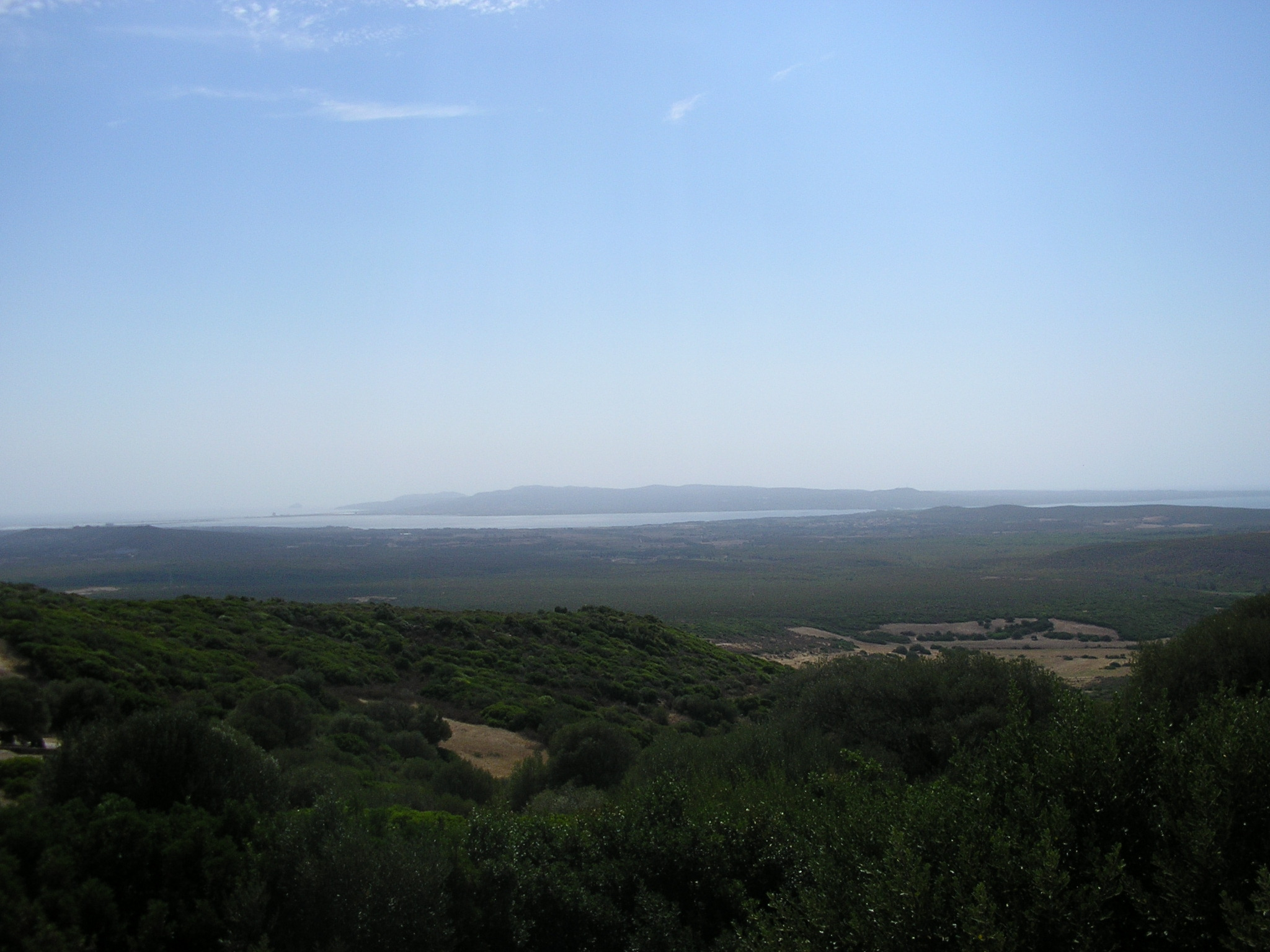
The island of Sant'Antioco as seen from Monte Sirai

Sant'Antioco is the second largest island of the Sardinian region, after Sardinia itself, with a surface of 109 km^{2} (42 mi^{2}); it is also the fourth largest in Italy after Sicily, Sardinia and Elba. It is located some 87 km (54 mi) from Cagliari, to which is connected through the SS126 state road, using a modern bridge. The island is divided between the two municipalities of Sant'Antioco and Calasetta. Other settlements are the small tourist resort of Maladroxia (a frazione of Sant'Antioco municipality) and Cussorgia, part of Calasetta. The coast of the island is in part sandy and in part rocky. The main beaches in the island are Maladroxia and Coaquaddus, in the municipality of Sant'Antioco, and Sotto Torre, Le Saline and Spiaggia Grande in the municipality of Calasetta.

== History ==
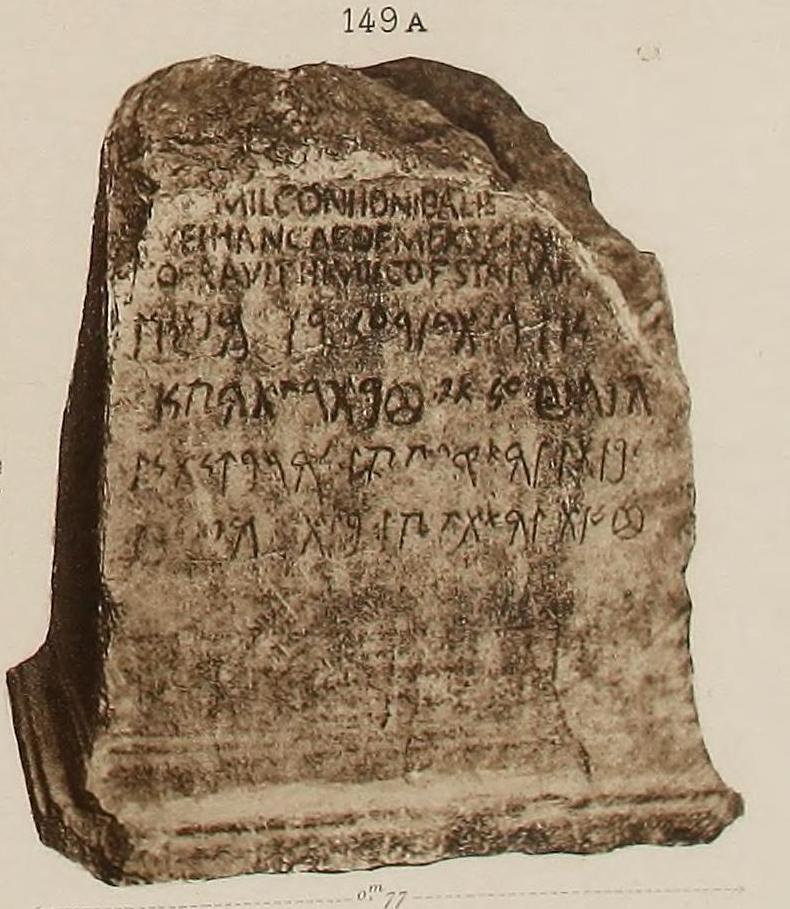
The Sant'Antioco bilingual evidences the island's Phoenician history

The island of Sant'Antioco was settled at least from the 5th millennium BC (the so-called culture of San Michele of Ozieri), which was based mainly on fishing and agriculture. Typical tombs (called domus de janas) and menhirs belonging to this culture have been found. The island also housed the nuragic civilization: findings include the Giants' grave of Su Niu de su Crobu ("Crow's Nest").

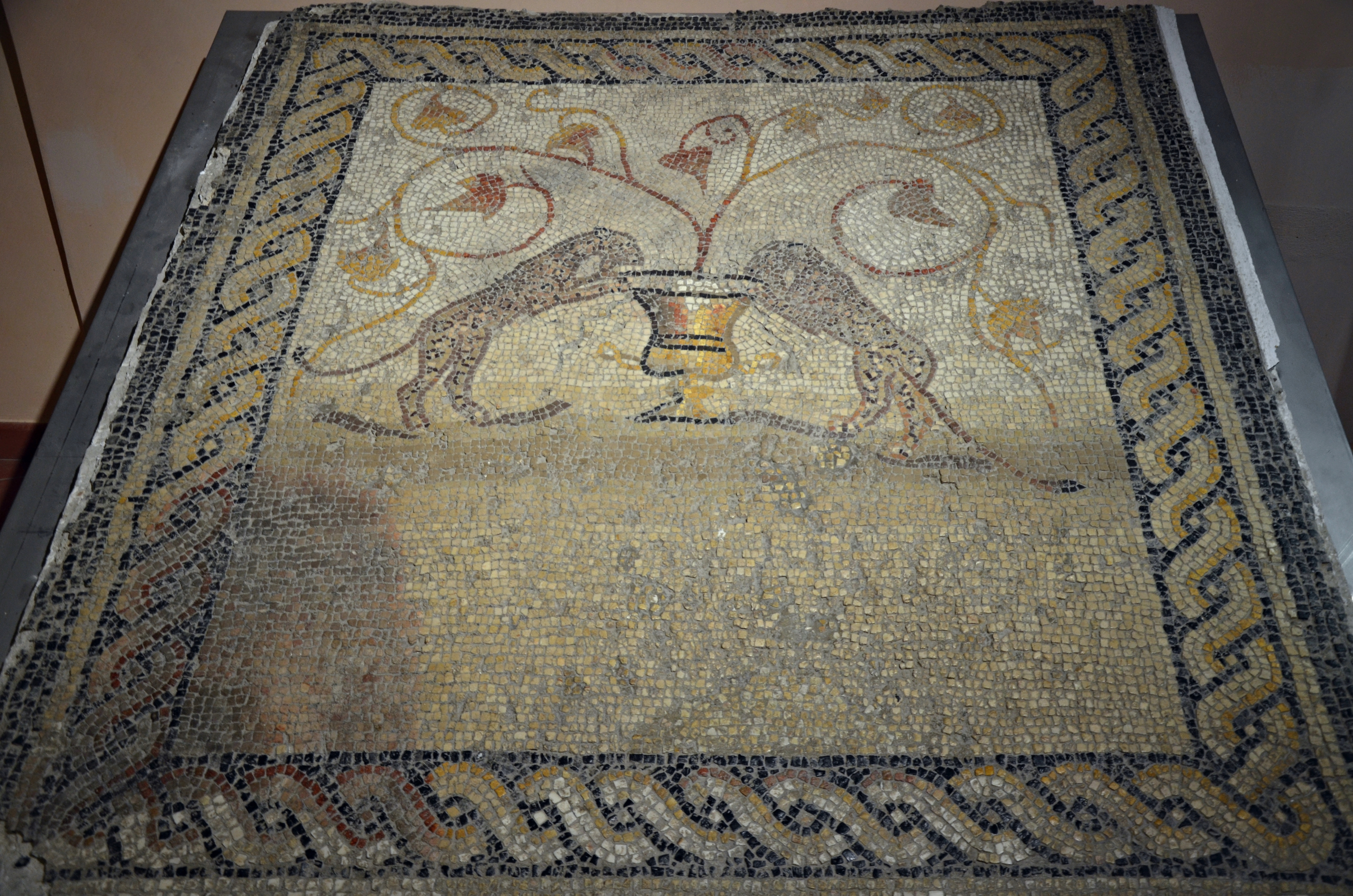
Roman mosaic pavement depicting two panthers drinking from a krater

In the 8th century BC the Phoenicians founded a new settlement, with the name of Sulky (Punic: slky) or Solki, of which a tophet (children) necropolis has been excavated. Later (6th century BC) it became a Carthaginian colony, to which another necropolis belongs. The Punic domination ended in the 3rd century BC, when Sulky was conquered by the Romans, who connected it to the mainland through an artificial isthmus. During the civil war between Julius Caesar and Pompey it sided with the latter, being severely punished after his defeat. During Roman times, it was called Plumbaria, after its lead deposits.

The current city name derives from St. Antiochus, evangelizer of the area, who was martyred in 125 AD. After the decline and the end of the Western Roman Empire, Sant'Antioco was a fortified strong point of the Byzantines. It was repeatedly attacked by the Saracens starting from the early 8th century, and gradually abandoned by the inhabitants who fled to the more protected inner area; the island mainly remained important as the end of pilgrimages devoted to St. Antiochus. A new settlement (bidda in Sardinian) was established around 935 by the judge (the local title for lord) of Cagliari, but this also was abandoned after the end of the giudicato. The island was a territory of the Kingdom of Sardinia (created in 1324) and later was acquired by archbishopric of Cagliari (1503) and, in 1758, by the religious Order of SS. Maurizio and Lazzaro. In the 18th century the area began to be repopulated and toward the mid of the century there were 38 houses, 15 workshops, and 164 huts, with some 450 inhabitants.

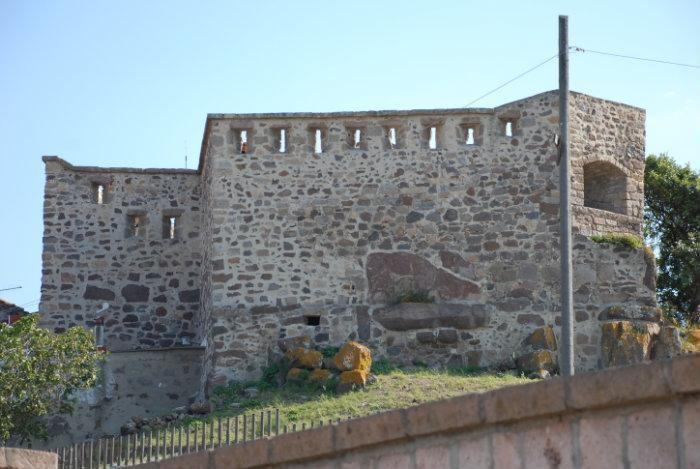
Forte of Su Pisu, 1813-15

In January–May 1793 the island was occupied by French troops under admiral Laurent Jean François Truguet, and the citizens freed from ecclesiastical taxes. The last attack by North African pirates occurred in 1815; the same year in which the relics of the patron saint were brought back to the cathedral.

== Climate ==
Climate data for S. Antioco (1981–2010)
Month	Jan	Feb	Mar	Apr	May	Jun	Jul	Aug	Sep	Oct	Nov	Dec	Year
Mean daily maximum °C (°F)	15.1 (59.2)	15.9 (60.6)	18.3 (64.9)	20.3 (68.5)	24.8 (76.6)	29.1 (84.4)	31.9 (89.4)	32.3 (90.1)	28.2 (82.8)	24.7 (76.5)	19.5 (67.1)	16.0 (60.8)	23.0 (73.4)
Mean daily minimum °C (°F)	7.4 (45.3)	7.1 (44.8)	8.9 (48.0)	10.7 (51.3)	14.7 (58.5)	18.2 (64.8)	20.9 (69.6)	21.3 (70.3)	18.3 (64.9)	15.5 (59.9)	11.6 (52.9)	8.4 (47.1)	13.6 (56.5)
Average precipitation mm (inches)	56.2 (2.21)	57.1 (2.25)	42.2 (1.66)	53.3 (2.10)	28.6 (1.13)	12.1 (0.48)	0.6 (0.02)	7.4 (0.29)	41.9 (1.65)	60.3 (2.37)	83.5 (3.29)	73.9 (2.91)	517.1 (20.36)
Source: Climatologia della Sardegna per il trentennio 1981-2010

== Demographics ==
Historical population
Year	Pop.	±%
1861	3,065	—
1871	3,188	+4.0%
1881	3,495	+9.6%
1901	4,052	+15.9%
1911	4,613	+13.8%
1921	5,249	+13.8%
1931	6,564	+25.1%
1936	6,774	+3.2%
1951	9,816	+44.9%
1961	10,993	+12.0%
1971	11,313	+2.9%
1981	12,404	+9.6%
1991	12,313	−0.7%
2001	11,730	−4.7%
2011	11,496	−2.0%
2021	10,756	−6.4%
Source: ISTAT

As of 2026, the population is 10,404, of which 49.0% are male, and 51.0% are female. Minors make up 10.4% of the population, and seniors make up 33.2%.

=== Immigration ===
As of 2025, immigrants make up 3.4% of the total population. The 5 largest foreign countries of birth are France, Germany, Romania, Switzerland, and China.

Foreign population by country of birth (2025)
Country	Population
France	51
Germany	49
Romania	38
Switzerland	38
China	18
Poland	10
Spain	10
Belgium	9
United Kingdom	9
Venezuela	9
Netherlands	8
Russia	8
Morocco	7
Brazil	6
Ukraine	6

== Main sights ==
- The Palaeo-Christian Basilica of Sant'Antioco, restored in 1089–1102 with its catacombs
- Roman bridge
- Roman fountain
- Ancient acropolis
- Phoenician and Punic necropolises
- Tophet
- Hypogeal village
- Ferruccio Barreca Archaeological Museum
- The Forte Su Pisu (1812)

== Events ==
In the period from 15 May to 15 June a famous tuna "mattanza" is held, with fishing of Atlantic bluefin tuna (Thunnus thynnus).

== Gallery ==
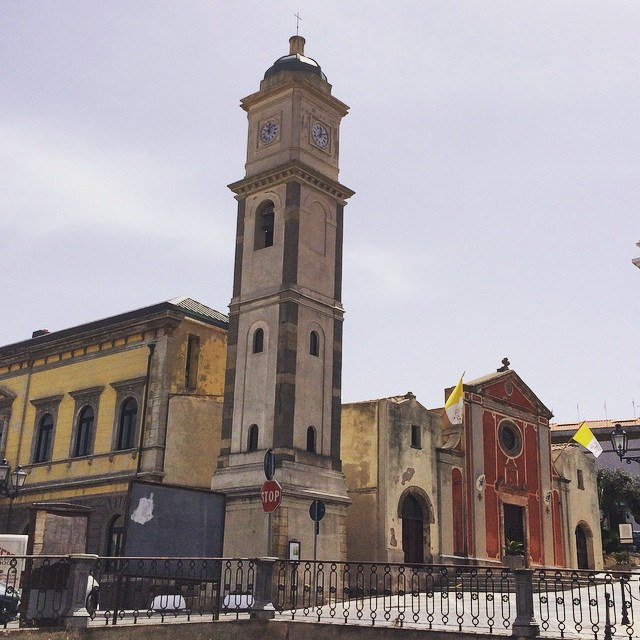
Basilica of Sant'Antioco Martire

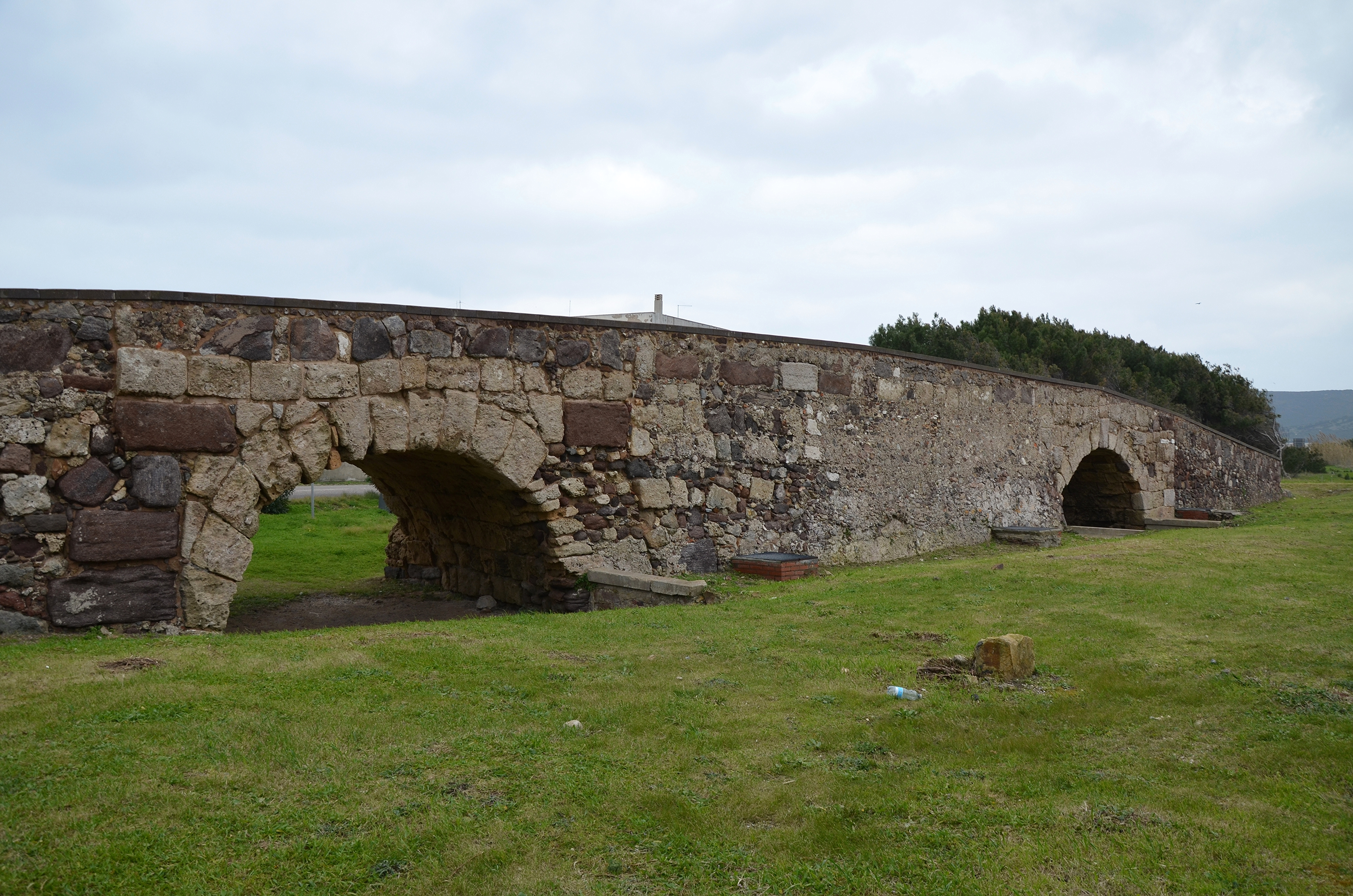
Roman bridge

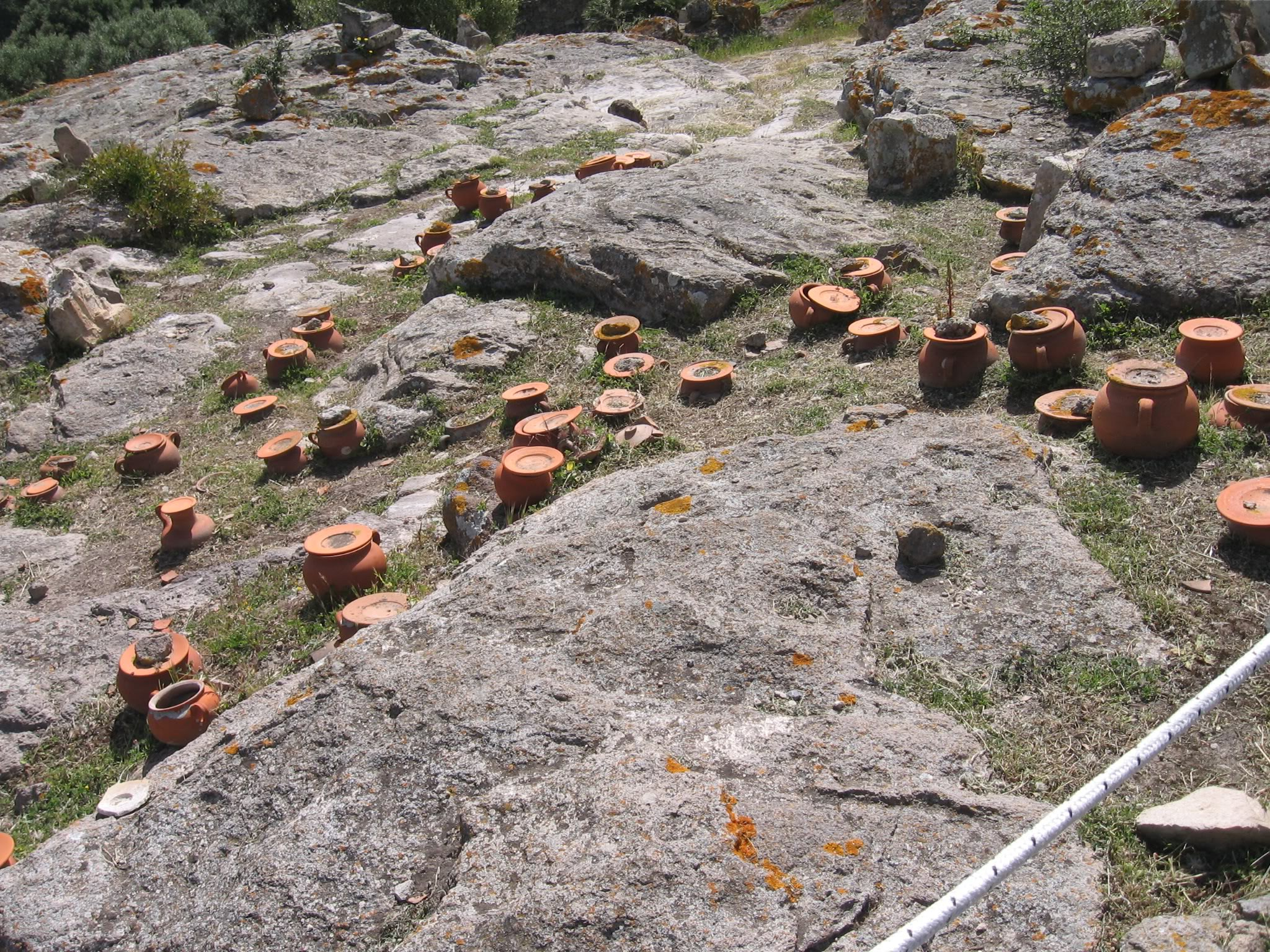
Tophet

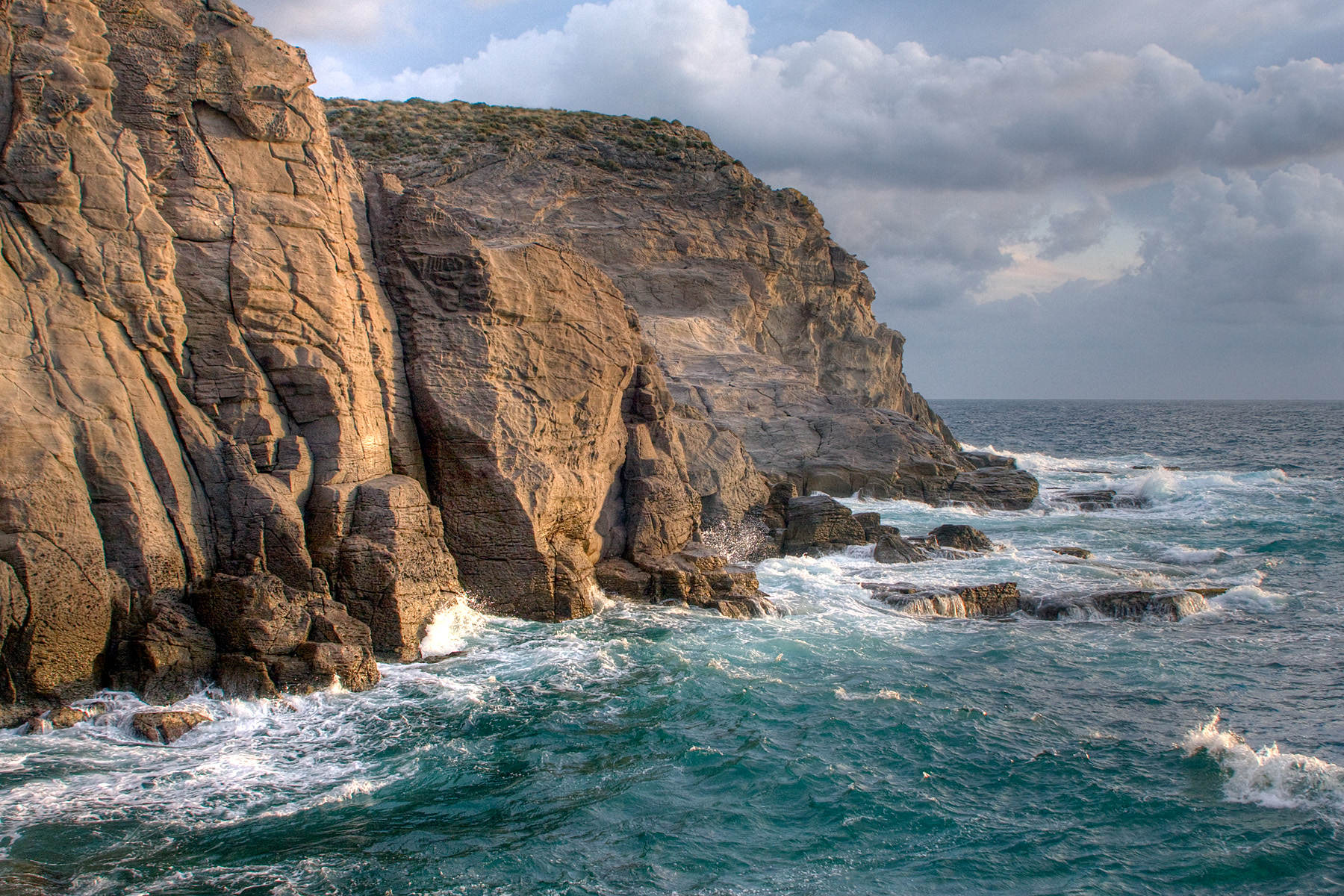
Cliffs

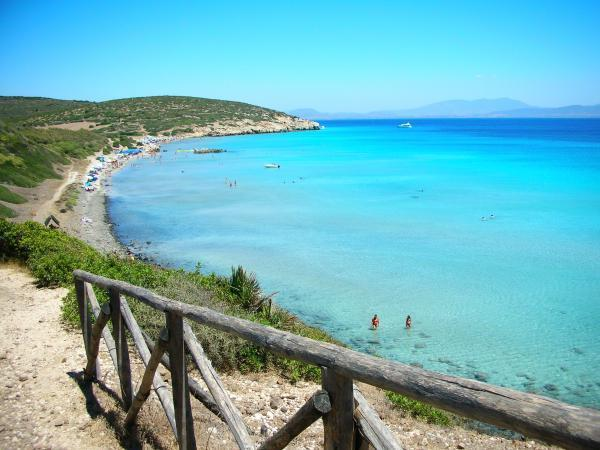
Coaquaddus beach

== See also ==
- List of islands of Italy
