= Jeremy Harkins =

American soccer player

Personal information
- Full name: Jeremy Harkins
- Place of birth: United States
- Position: Midfielder

College career
Years	Team	Apps	(Gls)
1995–1999	Butler Bulldogs		

Senior career*
Years	Team	Apps	(Gls)
1996–1997	Detroit Dynamite		
1998–1999	Mid-Michigan Bucks	2	(1)
1999	Cincinnati Riverhawks	2	(0)
2004–2005	Windsor Border Stars		

Managerial career
- 2023: Oakland Golden Grizzlies (women's assistant)
- * Club domestic league appearances and goals

Jeremy Harkins is an American former soccer player who played in the USISL Premier League, USL A-League, and the Canadian Professional Soccer League.

== Playing career ==
Harkins began his career in 1996 with Detroit Dynamite of the USISL Premier League. During his two-year tenure he reached the playoffs in both seasons. In 1998, he signed with division rivals the Mid-Michigan Bucks, where he appeared in two matches and recorded one goal. In 1999, he signed with Cincinnati Riverhawks of the USL A-League. He featured in two matches for the Riverhawks. On January 25, 2004, he signed with newly formed Windsor Border Stars of the Canadian Professional Soccer League. In his debut season with Windsor he helped the club claim the Open Canada Cup. He also reached the playoffs with Windsor by finishing third in the Western Conference. In the playoffs Windsor faced Toronto Croatia. but were defeated by a score of 5–0. In 2005, he repeated his success with Windsor by defending their Open Canada Cup title. The club once more reached the postseason, but were defeated by Oakville Blue Devils.

== Coaching career ==
Harkins has stayed active in Michigan youth soccer, where he is a coach and co-owner of Nationals Soccer. He has also featured as a coach for the Oakland Golden Grizzlies and for Union FC Macomb in USL League Two and USL W League.
