= Huffman Eja-Tabe =

Cameroonian footballer (born 1981)

Huffman Eja
Personal information
- Full name: Huffman Eja-Tabe
- Date of birth: May 6, 1981 (age 45)
- Place of birth: Limbe, Cameroon
- Height: 5 ft 6 in (1.68 m)
- Position: Midfielder

Youth career
- Algonquin College

Senior career*
| Years | Team | Apps | (Gls) |
| 2005–06 | Toronto Lynx | 22 | (1) |
| 2006 | Oakville Blue Devils | 8 | (0) |
| 2007 | Ottawa Fury | 8 | (0) |
- * Club domestic league appearances and goals as of February 16, 2015

Huffman Eja-Tabe (born May 6, 1981 in Limbe, Cameroon) is a former professional soccer player who played in the USL First Division, Canadian Soccer League, and the USL Premier Development League.

== Career ==
Before turning professional he played four seasons at Algonquin College winning the OCAA Silver Medal in 2001, and the CCAA Championship in 2002. In 2003, he received his second OCAA Silver Medal and in 2004 the OCAA Provincial Champion. In 2002 and 2004 he was selected as OCAA League All-Star, and was a CCAA All-Canadian selection in 2004.

In 2004, Huffman played in the Ottawa-Carleton Soccer League with Ottawa St. Anthony Italia under head coach Hubert Busby, Jr. He went professional the following year in 2005, after Busby, Jr was appointed the new head coach for Toronto Lynx of the USL First Division and signed Huffman to a contract. He made his debut for the club on April 23, 2005 in the Lynx's season opener against the Portland Timbers, coming on as a substitute for Jamie Dodds. He recorded his first goal for the club on August 21, 2005 in a 1-1 draw against the Puerto Rico Islanders. Huffman returned to Toronto for the 2006 season, and is signing was announced in a press conference unveiling the roster for the 2006 season.

After only appearing in 3 matches he was released, and played the remainder of the season with the Oakville Blue Devils in the Canadian Soccer League, helping the team clinch the National Division title. In 2007 he signed with the Ottawa Fury of the USL Premier Development League, and made his debut in a match against Brooklyn Knights on 24 June 2007.
