= Alan Placek =

American soccer player

Personal information
- Full name: Alan Placek
- Place of birth: United States
- Position: Goalkeeper

Senior career*
Years	Team	Apps	(Gls)
1996–1997	Mid-Michigan Bucks	13	(0)
1998–2001	Detroit Rockers (indoor)	32	(0)
1999–2000	Mid-Michigan Bucks		(0)
2004	Windsor Border Stars	18	(0)
- * Club domestic league appearances and goals

Alan Placek is an American former soccer player who played in the USISL Premier League, National Professional Soccer League, and the Canadian Professional Soccer League.

== Playing career ==
Placek played four years of college soccer at Butler University.

Placek began his professional career in 1996 with the Mid-Michigan Bucks in the USISL Premier League. During his first tenure with the Bucks he helped the club win their division title in 1997. In 1998, he signed with the Detroit Rockers of the National Professional Soccer League, where he appeared in 32 matches. In 1999, he returned to Michigan helping the club to win two division titles. In 2004, Placek signed with the newly formed Windsor Border Stars of the Canadian Professional Soccer League. In his debut season he helped the club reach the final of the Open Canada Cup, where Windsor faced Ottawa St. Anthony Italia and won the tournament by defeating Ottawa 4–2 in penalties. During the regular season he helped Windsor finish third in the Western Conference, and clinch a postseason berth. In the quarterfinals the team faced Toronto Croatia, but suffered a 5–0 defeat.
