= History of Tripoli =

History of Tripoli may refer to:

- History of Tripoli, Lebanon, a city in Lebanon
- History of Tripoli, Libya, a city in Libya
- History of the County of Tripoli, a crusader state in what is now Lebanon
