= Jeff Hodgson =

Canadian soccer player

Personal information
- Full name: Jeffrey Hodgson
- Place of birth: Windsor, Ontario, Canadian
- Position: Midfielder

Senior career*
Years	Team	Apps	(Gls)
1995	Tucson Amigos		
1997	Arizona Sandsharks (indoor)	22	(0)
1998–2001	Detroit Rockers (indoor)	66	(2)
2003	London City		
2004–2008	Windsor Border Stars		

Managerial career
- 1994–1995: Western Michigan Broncos (assistant )
- 2010–2016: Madonna Crusaders (women)
- 2011: Windsor Stars
- * Club domestic league appearances and goals

Jeff Hodgson is a Canadian former soccer player, coach, and businessman.

== Playing career ==
Hodgson began his career in 1995 with Tucson Amigos in the USISL Premier League. In 1996, he signed with Arizona Sandsharks of the Continental Indoor Soccer League. During his tenure with Arizona he appeared in 22 matches. After the demise of the CISL he signed with Detroit Rockers of the National Professional Soccer League. During his four year stint with Detroit he appeared in 66 matches, and recorded one goal. In 2003, he returned to Canada to sign with London City of the Canadian Professional Soccer League. The following year Hodgson created the Windsor Border Stars franchise to compete in the Canadian Professional Soccer League. He held several roles within the organization as active player, and team manager. He helped Windsor win two Open Canada Cups, and one AISL Championship. After five seasons in the CPSL the club faced financial problems which resulted in the league revoking the clubs franchise.

== Managerial career ==
His first managerial job was as assistant coach for Western Michigan University men's soccer team. On February 4, 2010 he was appointed the head coach for Madonna University women's soccer team. In 2011, former Windsor teammate Filip Rocca was awarded a Windsor franchise in the Canadian Soccer League, and brought back Hodgson to jointly head coach the Windsor Stars with Steve Vagnini. Hodgson stepped down as Madonna's coach in 2016.
