= Tripoli air crash =

Tripoli air crash may refer to

- Libyan Arab Airlines Flight 1103 - a mid air collision on approach to Tripoli International Airport in 1992
- Afriqiyah Airways Flight 771 - a crash on approach to Tripoli International Airport in 2010
