= Bombing of Libya =

Bombing of Libya or similar terms may refer to:

- 1911–1912: Giulio Gavotti, first-in-the-world aerial bombardment in a heavier-than-air flyer and first-in-the-world night mission in same; Italo-Turkish War in Libya
- 1942–43: Egypt–Libya Campaign, a World War II campaign
- 1986: Ouadi Doum air raid, a French campaign during the Chadian–Libyan conflict
- 1986 United States bombing of Libya, a U.S. air raid following the Berlin disco bombing
- 2011 military intervention in Libya, a multi-state campaign to depose the Gaddafi government
