= Tripoli Airport =

Tripoli Airport may refer to:

== Greece ==
- Tripoli Airport (Greece), a small military airport in Tripoli, Greece

== Libya ==
- Tripoli International Airport, international airport in Tripoli, Libya, used for commercial aviation
- Mitiga International Airport, cargo airport in Tripoli, Libya, used for commercial/cargo and military aviation
