= Jaman Tripoli =

American soccer player

Personal information
- Full name: Jaman Tripoli
- Place of birth: Rochester, Michigan
- Position: Defensive midfielder

Senior career*
Years	Team	Apps	(Gls)
1998	Raleigh Flyers	24	(2)
1998–2000	Detroit Rockers (indoor)	55	(2)
1999–2003	Pittsburgh Riverhounds	105	(4)
2005	Windsor Border Stars		
- * Club domestic league appearances and goals

Jaman Tripoli is a former American soccer player who played in the USL A-League, National Professional Soccer League, and the Canadian Professional Soccer League.

== Playing career ==
Tripoli began his professional career in 1998 with Raleigh Flyers of the USL A-League. In his debut season he appeared in 24 matches, and recorded two goals. At the conclusion of the A-League season he signed with Detroit Rockers of the National Professional Soccer League to play indoor soccer. He would play a total of two seasons with the franchise, and appeared in 55 matches, with two goals. In 1999, Tripoli joined the newly formed Pittsburgh Riverhounds of the USL A-League. He would play for the club for five seasons, until the September 12, 2003 when the organization was voluntarily relegated to the USL Pro Soccer League, and terminated all of its players contracts. In 2005, he signed with Windsor Border Stars of the Canadian Professional Soccer League. In his debut season with Windsor he helped the club win the Open Canada Cup, and finished third in the Western Conference. In the postseason the club was eliminated in the first round of the playoffs.
