= Raymond of Tripoli =

Raymond of Tripoli may refer to:

- Raymond I of Tripoli (Raymond IV, Count of Toulouse), (c. 1041 or 1042 –1105), Count of Toulouse, Duke of Narbonne, Margrave of Provence and a leader of the First Crusade
- Raymond II, Count of Tripoli (c.1115–1152)
- Raymond III, Count of Tripoli (1140–1187), also Prince of Galilee and Tiberias
- Raymond IV, Count of Tripoli (died 1199), also prince regent of Antioch
