= Ontario Soccer League =

- Country: Canada
- Confederation: CONCACAF
- Number of clubs: 10
- Relegation to: OSL Regional Divisions
- Domestic cup: Challenge Trophy
- Current champions: Durham Celtic FC (2017)

The Ontario Soccer League (OSL) is a competitive amateur soccer league in Ontario, Canada. The OSL is affiliated with and governed by the Ontario Soccer Association. According to the OSA, the OSL has Provincial Leagues, Regional Leagues and Multi-Jurisdictional Leagues.

The league is divided into 12 regional divisions. Teams are eligible to compete for the Challenge Trophy. The league is considered Tier 5.

== Regions ==
For the 2022 season, the Ontario Soccer League is divided into two regional leagues: West and East.

== Teams ==
The following teams are taking part in the 2025 season:

Location of Ontario Soccer League teams for the 2025 season.
Provincial Elite Provincial Divisions Regional Divisions Multijurisdictional Divisions

Provincial Elite

Caledon United FC Elite
Cavan FC
GS United
Hrvat St. Catharines
Olimpia Toronto
Panathinaikos
Vaughan Azzurri
Woodbridge Strikers

Provincial West	Provincial East
AC Soccer Diavoli; Burloak Titans FC; Caledon United FC PW; Ebony Jrs; Guelph Royals; JJD Sports; Lakeshore United; Mississauga Croatia	Aurora Hearts; FC Ukraine United; Downsview Rams; Hungaria Toronto VFC; Pana 2.0; PARS FC; Scarboro Azzurri Blues; Toronto AFC; Toronto Celtic; Woodbridge Strikers
Regional West	Regional East
Bradford Wolves; Clarkson Comets; Croatia Norval; Distinctionz SC; Guelph Royals; Hamilton Serbians; Orangeville Athletics; Peniche CC; Wisla United	Artemisium FC; GS Vets; Korean Red Devils United; Markham Lightning; Olympiakos SC; Peterborough City; Queens Park Rangers; Toronto Pamir; Toronto Skillz FC
Multijurisdictional West	Multijurisdictional East
Prostars FC; No Finish FC; Distinctionz SC MJ; Ebony II; Georgetown Mustangs; SC Toronto; Sporting FC Mens; York Jets	Atletico Sporting Toronto; Aurora Lions; Newmarket United; QPR MJ; Rustic AC; Scarborough Rangers SC

== Champions ==
- 2006 Sora Sun Devils (east) & Wisla United (west)
- 2007 Hearts Azzurri (east) & Hamilton Serbians (west)
- 2008 GS United (east) & PCC Supersonics (west)
- 2009 GS United (east) & Croatia Hamilton (west)
- 2010 GS United PE (east) & Caledon FC (west)
- 2011 GS United PE (east) & PCC Mississauga (west)
- 2012 Ulster Thistle
- 2013 Caledon FC
- 2014 Caledon FC
- 2015 PCC Mississauga
- 2016 Caledon FC
- 2017 Durham Celtic
- 2018 GS United
- 2019 Woodbridge Strikers
- 2021 Hungaria Vasas (east) & Hrvat St. Catharines (west)
