= Windsor City FC =

Canadian soccer team

- Full name: Windsor TFC
- Nickname: Stars
- Founded: 2004 (as Windsor Border Stars)
- Stadium: Acumen Stadium; Windsor, Ontario
- Capacity: 2,000
- Owner(s): Vancho Cirovski and unnamed partner
- Coach: Gabriel Poulino
- League: League1 Ontario
- 2025: L1O-C, 8th
- Website: https://windsorcityfc.com/
Home colours	Away colours

Windsor City FC (formerly Windsor Border Stars, Windsor Stars, and Windsor TFC) is a Canadian soccer team, based in Windsor, Ontario, that plays in League1 Ontario. The club was founded in 2004 and has previously competed in the Canadian Professional Soccer League (CPSL) and Canadian Soccer League (CSL). Throughout their tenure in the CPSL/CSL, Windsor won two Open Canada Cups, one American Indoor Soccer League (AISL) Championship, and maintained a status of regular playoff contender. Around the 2008 CSL season, the club faced financial and player commitment problems which resulted in the league revoking the franchise. In 2011, former Windsor and CSL Defender of the Year Filip Rocca was granted a franchise and brought back Windsor to compete in the Canadian Soccer League. Following the de-sanctioning of the CSL by the Canadian Soccer Association the club joined the newly formed League1 Ontario in 2014. The team plays their home games at the St. Clair College. The team's colours are red and white.

The team is affiliated with the Toronto FC Academy, with the club's youth teams operating as Windsor TFC

== History ==
On December 23, 2003 the Canadian Professional Soccer League granted a franchise to Windsor under the joint ownership of former soccer player Jeff Hodgson, John Dowhan, and Gary Maccagnone. Windsor received territorial rights to the Detroit–Windsor area, and Windsor Stadium as their home venue. These marked a return of professional soccer to the Windsor area since the 1980s when the Windsor Wheels competed in the Canadian National Soccer League. On January 24, 2004 the Windsor Border Stars were revealed to the public, and former Blackburn Rovers player Pat Hilton was announced the club's first head coach. The original roster was a mixture of former National Professional Soccer League, and Windsor Croatia players. Notable acquisitions were Alan Placek, Jeremy Harkins, Tati Errecalde, Tino Scicluna, Filip Rocca, Chris King, and Scott Patriquin.

The club debuted on June 5, 2004 in a match against Toronto Croatia, and won the match by a score of 1–0 with the goal from Errecalde. Windsor finished third in the Western Conference, and clinched a postseason berth in its debut season. Their opponents in the first round of the playoffs were Toronto Croatia, but they were eliminated from the playoffs by a score of 5–0.

Windsor's biggest achievement came in capturing the Open Canada Cup, where they faced Ottawa St. Anthony Italia. Errecalde scored the lone goal for Windsor, but Ottawa equalized and the match went into penalties where Windsor prevailed by winning the shootout. At the CPSL awards banquet Justin Marshall was awarded the CPSL Defender of the Year, while Hilton received the CPSL Coach of the Year.

During the winter of 2004/2005 Windsor competed in the American Indoor Soccer League for the indoor season. In their debut season in the AISL the club won the AISL Championship by defeating Cincinnati Excite by a score of 4–1. In preparation for the 2005 CPSL season, Hilton strengthen the squad with the signings of Jaman Tripoli, and Radek Papiez. The Border Stars managed to defend their Open Canada title by defeating London City 3–0. In the regular season the team finished third in the Western Conference, and faced Oakville Blue Devils in the postseason. The result of the match concluded in a 3–1 defeat to Windsor. At the conclusion of the season Aaron Byrd won the CPSL Golden Boot as the league's highest goalscorer, and while Filip Rocca won the CPSL Defender of the Year.

For the 2006 season, the CPSL renamed itself the Canadian Soccer League (CSL), and the International and National divisions were created to replace the Western, and Eastern Conferences. Windsor transferred from the Western Conference to the National Division. In preparation for the 2006 CSL season, Windsor acquired the services of former NPSL players Worteh Sampson, Dominic Scicluna, and Will Kletzien. The season marked an end to Windsor's run as Open Canada Cup champions as the Border Stars suffered a quarterfinal loss to Ottawa St. Anthony Italia. In the regular season Windsor managed to secure the final playoff berth in the National Division. In the first round of the postseason Windsor faced Oakville and avenged their previous quarterfinal loss with a 2–1 victory with goals from Sampson, and Kletzien. In the next round the Border Stars faced division champions the Serbian White Eagles, but suffered a 6–1 defeat. For the second year in a row Rocca was awarded the CSL Defender of the Year.

Original Border Stars logo (2004–08)

In 2007 Windsor experienced roadblocks as the team sometimes failed to assemble enough substitutes for their away matches. The team persevered and managed to clinch the final playoff berth. The club faced the White Eagles and failed to advance after a 2–1 defeat. The following season the Border Stars experienced the same problem of having a shortage of reserves for away matches. As a result, the season was a battle between St. Catharines Wolves and Windsor for the final postseason berth. St. Catharines clinched the final berth by conceding fewer goals than Windsor, thus marking the first time in Windsor's history that it did not make the playoffs. On April 25, 2009, the CSL revoked the Windsor franchise after they failed to meet their financial obligations.

Windsor Stars logo (2011–16

In early 2011, the league announced that former Border Star defender, Filip Rocca, was awarded a franchise and would resurrect the club in Windsor. The Border Stars were renamed the Windsor Stars Pro Soccer and returned to the CSL for the 2011 season. Rocca pledged to build strong connections with the local soccer community and district association, the Essex County Soccer Association, in order to avoid the failure that led to the Border Stars folding. The club owes its history and its name to the Windsor Stars of the 1970s and the Windsor Wheels of the 1980s from the Canadian National Soccer League, the predecessor of the CSL.

The team was re-launched with two head coaches, Steve Vagnini and Jeff Hodgson, who were announced in February 2011. Windsor brought back veterans Byrd, Anthony Santilli, Gino Berardi, and signed Canadian international Stephen Ademolu. The club finished the regular season second to last in the league with a record of 3-19-4, and missed out on the playoffs. In the 2012 season, the team began with a slow start, but later managed an eight-game undefeated streak and finished fourth in the overall standings, qualifying for their firsts postseason since the 2007 CSL season. However, Windsor did not make it out of the first round after a 1–0 defeat to York Region Shooters. Steve Vagnini was awarded the CSL Coach of the Year on November 25, 2012.

Windsor managed to secure another playoff berth in 2012 after finishing sixth in the overall standings. Again their playoff run was short-lived after they lost 2–0 to Toronto Croatia. Following the de-sanctioning of the CSL by the Canadian Soccer Association in 2013, the Windsor Stars Pro Soccer Club was announced as one of the 10 teams participating in the inaugural season of League1 Ontario, a newly formed competition in the third division of Canadian soccer, on April 8, 2014. With home games being played at McHugh Park in Windsor, the club sought funding to turn the field into a stadium with proper seating and scoreboard to boost interest in the area.

Windsor TFC logo

In June 2016, it was announced that Windsor would be enter a partnership with Toronto FC of Major League Soccer. The partnership makes Windsor a satellite club to Toronto FC, and its name was changed to "Windsor TFC". In 2023, the club re-branded its League1 Ontario teams as Windsor City FC, while the youth teams will retain the Windsor TFC name, as they retain their association with the professional club.

== Youth history ==
Prior to 2016, before the Windsor Stars and Toronto FC's partnership was established, the academy team players were competing locally in the Windsor Essex County District Soccer League playing for Ciocaro Soccer Club. During their time as Ciocaro, they found themselves on top of the league every year. At the end of the 2014 season, the basis of the academy team changed from playing locally, to playing in high level tournaments throughout Ontario. The team went by the name of Windsor VH Academy, and for two years, they competed in tournaments only, and enjoyed a great deal of success. In 2016, the affiliation between the Windsor Stars and Toronto FC was confirmed, and VH Academy took over the under 18 academy team. This meant that they would be competing in the Level three division for the following season. By the start of the 2017 season, Windsor TFC had established three more teams to compete throughout Ontario, an under 16 boys team playing in Level three, an under 14 boys team playing in the S.A.A.C league, and an under 12 team competing in the S.A.A.C league. In the 2017 season, Windsor TFC U17 boys team went undefeated. The team won an amazing 22 wins and 1 draw.

In 2016, when the now under 18 academy team was still playing as Windsor VH, they enjoyed a very successful campaign throughout the nine tournaments and various exhibition games they competed in. They finished the 2016 year with a record of 26 wins, 13 losses, 7 ties, 116 goals for and 68 goals against, winning five out of the nine tournaments they entered as well as reaching the final on one occasion, including the Henderson Tournament and the Ontario Cup.

The next season would end up being the academy's first year under the Windsor TFC title. They began the year in style, going 23 games undefeated to begin the season, with 22 wins and 1 draw. This set the tone for the rest of the year where they easily won the level three league title. Clenching it with three games remaining, and eventually winning the league by seven points. This means that for the 2018 season, the under 18 boys would be promoted to the level 1 division. They competed in five tournaments during the 2017 season where they won on two occasions and reached the final on another two. They were also able to make it to the quarter final of the Tier 1 Ontario Cup. They finished the 2017 regular season with a record of 25 wins, 5 losses, 4 draws, 101 goals for and 29 goals against.

At the end of the 2017 season, it was announced that Windsor TFC would be taking over the L3 district program in Windsor for girls and boys born between 2003 and 2005. This meant that for the upcoming 2018 season, Windsor TFC will have a total of 8 clubs competing in Ontario, boys and girls under 13, under 14 and under 15 teams, as well as boys teams in the under 17 and under 18 age groups. Windsor TFC will continue to grow its program so that kids throughout Windsor can have access to the training and coaching they need to play at a high level. They are consistently hosting development camps and clinics with different high level coaches from places like Toronto FC, or various universities where kids are able to train with the best and get identified based on their skill.

== Notable former players ==
The following players have moved through the Windsor Stars or TFC program to become professional players, or played professionally before joining the team. Players in bold have senior international caps.

Canadian Soccer League

- (Argentina) Tati Errecalde
- (United States) Jeremy Harkins
- (Canada) Jeff Hodgson
- (United States) Joe Malachino
- (United States) Alan Placek
- (Liberia) Worteh Sampson
- (United States) Tino Scicluna
- (United States) Jaman Tripoli

CSL & League1 Ontario

- (Canada) **Stephen Ademolu**
- (Canada) Owen Antoniuk
- (Romania) Christian Dragoi
- (Canada) Gianfranco Facchineri

== Head coaches ==
Years	Name	Nation
2004–2008	Pat Hilton	England
2011	Steve Vagnini & Jeff Hodgson	Canada
2012–2016	Steve Vagnini	Canada
2016–2018	Zibby Piatkiewicz	Canada
2019	Ryan Mendonca	Canada
2021–2024	Valter Cosenza	Brazil
2025-present	Gabriel Poulino	Canada

== Year-by-year ==
Year	League	Teams	Record (W-D-L)	Regular season	Playoffs	Open Canada Cup/ Canadian Championship	League Cup	Ref
2004 (as Border Stars)	CPSL	11	9–4–7	3rd, West (6th)	Quarter-finals	Champions (Note: Open Canada Cup)	–	
2005 (as Border Stars)	CPSL	7	8–4–10	3rd, West (7th)	Quarter-finals	Champions	–	
2006 (as Border Stars)	CSL	12	8–6–8	4th, National (7th)	Semi-finals	Quarter-finals	–	
2007 (as Border Stars)	CSL	10	5–4–13	4th, National (8th)	Quarter-finals	Semi-finals	–	
2008 (as Border Stars)	CSL	11	7–5–10	5th, National (9th)	Did not qualify	Not eligible (Note: Canadian Championship)	–	
2009	No franchise							
2010	No franchise							
2011 (as Stars)	CSL	14	3–4–19	13th	Did not qualify	Not eligible	–	
2012 (as Stars)	CSL	16	12–4–6	4th	Quarter-finals	Not eligible	–	
2013 (as Stars)	CSL	12	8–3–11	6th	Quarter-finals	Not eligible	–	
2014 (as Stars)	League1 Ontario	9	6–2–8	6th	–	Not eligible	Group stage	
2015 (as Stars)	League1 Ontario	12	7–6–9	8th	–	Not eligible	Quarter-finals	
2016 (as Stars)	League1 Ontario	16	9–1–11	5th, West (9th)	–	Not eligible	Round of 16	
2017 (as TFC)	League1 Ontario	16	6–4–12	6th, West (11th)	–	Not eligible	Round of 16	
2018 (as TFC)	League1 Ontario	17	1–5–10	17th	Did not qualify	Did not qualify	Round of 16	
2019 (as TFC)	League1 Ontario	16	3–2–10	13th	Did not qualify	Did not qualify	–	
2020	League1 Ontario	Season cancelled due to COVID-19 pandemic						
2021 (as TFC)	League1 Ontario	15	0–2–10	8th, West (13th overall)	Did not qualify	Did not qualify	–	
2022 (as TFC)	League1 Ontario	22	5–3–13	18th	Did not qualify	Did not qualify	–	
2023	League1 Ontario	21	6–2–12	15th	Did not qualify	Did not qualify	–	
2024	League1 Ontario Championship	10	5–4–9	6th	–	Did not qualify	Round of 32	
2025	League1 Ontario Championship	12	7–5–10	8th	-	Did not qualify	Round of 16	

== Titles ==
as Windsor Border Stars

- **Open Canada Cup**

2004, 2005

- **AISL Championship**

2005

== See also ==
- Canadian Soccer League
