= Tati Errecalde =

Argentine footballer

Personal information
- Full name: Fernando Errecalde
- Place of birth: Tandil, Argentina
- Position: Forward

Senior career*
Years	Team	Apps	(Gls)
1996–1997	Detroit Rockers (indoor)	27	(6)
1996–1997	Toronto Shooting Stars (indoor)	3	(1)
1997–1999	Detroit Rockers (indoor)	64	(15)
2004–2005	Windsor Border Stars	29	(15)
2005–2006	St. Louis Steamers		
- * Club domestic league appearances and goals

Tati Errecalde is a former Argentinian footballer who played in the National Professional Soccer League, Canadian Professional Soccer League, and the Major Indoor Soccer League.

== Playing career ==
Errecalde began his professional career in 1996 with the Detroit Rockers of the National Professional Soccer League. In his first season with Detroit he appeared in 27 matches and recorded six goals. Midway through the season he was traded to the Toronto Shooting Stars, where he played in three matches and scored one goal. In 1997, he returned to Detroit and featured in a total of 64 matches, and recorded 15 goals. In 2004, he signed with newly formed Windsor Border Stars of the Canadian Professional Soccer League. In his first season in the CPSL he finished as the club's leading goal scorer with ten goals, and helped the club secure a postseason berth by finishing third in the Western Conference. In the playoffs Windsor faced Toronto Croatia, but were eliminated from the competition after losing the match by a score of 5–0. He made history in the Open Canada Cup tournament by scoring the equalizing goal in the cup final against Ottawa St. Anthony Italia, where Windsor claimed the title after settling the 1–1 draw with a 4–2 victory in a penalty shootout. The following season he helped Windsor defend their second Open Canada Cup, and claim the AISL Championship. In 2005, during the indoor winter season he signed with the St. Louis Steamers of the Major Indoor Soccer League. During his tenure with St. Louis he won the regular season championship, but were defeated in the playoff finals to Baltimore Blast.
