= Magpie River (Ontario) =

Magpie River Rivière Magpie
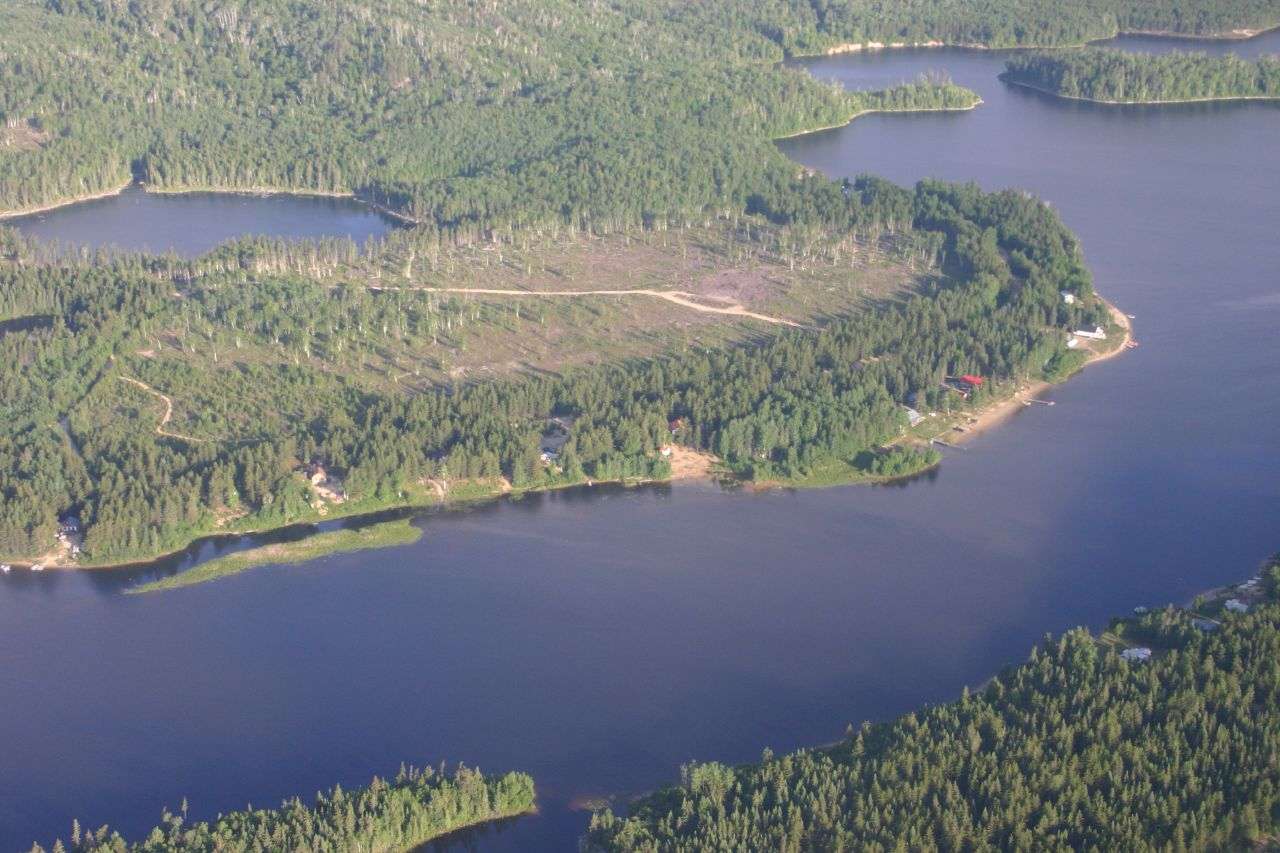
- Magpie River near Dubreuilville

- Location of the mouth of the Magpie River in Ontario
- Native name: Mutuhekau Shipu (Innu)

Location
- Country: Canada
- Province: Ontario
- Region: Northeastern Ontario
- District: Algoma

Physical characteristics
- Source: Upper Magpie Lake
  - coordinates: 48°38′05″N 84°37′18″W
  - elevation: 420 m (1,380 ft)
- Mouth: Lake Superior
  - coordinates: 47°56′02″N 84°50′59″W
  - elevation: 180 m (590 ft)
- Basin size: 1,900 km^{2} (730 sq mi)

Basin features
- Tributaries
  - left: Michipicoten River

The Magpie River is a river in Algoma District, northeastern Ontario, Canada, The river empties into Michipicoten Bay on Lake Superior near the town of Wawa. The river drains an area of about 1,900 square kilometres (734 sq mi).

== Course ==
The river begins at Upper Magpie Lake at an elevation of 420 metres (1,378 ft) and flows north then northeast through a series of lakes including Wejinabikun Lake and North Wejinabikun Lake, to a point at 48°43′24″N 84°33′30″W at an elevation of 357 metres (1,171 ft), before turning southeast to enter Mosambik Lake at an elevation of 347 metres (1,138 ft). The river exits at the north end of the lake and heads further north, and reaches a point as far north as 48°43′38″N 84°29′38″W at an elevation of 348 metres (1,142 ft), before heading east southeast into the northeast corner of Esnagi Lake. From the north end of Esnagi Lake, the Five Mile Portage leads north, over Five Mile Creek, to Five Mile Bay on Kabinakagami Lake on the Kabinakagami River, part of the Albany River system, which leads north to James Bay. An alternate route to James Bay is to take the further Pine Portage from Kabinakagami Lake then up the Oba River to the Albany Forks, from which the Mattawitchewan River flows downstream as part of the Missinaibi and Moose rivers into the bay.

At Esnagi Lake, the river takes in the right tributary Tripoli Creek. The Magpie river then leaves Esnagi Lake at the south end where the Canadian Pacific Railway transcontinental mainline crosses. It continues south, passes over the Jean Falls, and takes in the left tributary Peckerwood Creek at an elevation of 339 metres (1,112 ft). The river takes in the left tributary Hobon Creek just upstream of the community of Dubreuilville. There, it takes in the left tributary Herman Creek, is crossed by Highway 519, and takes a sharp turn west. The Soderston Creek enters from the right, and the river passes over the Toolong Rapids, where it once again heads south. The Evans Creek enters from the right, and the Magpie River passes over the Cedar Falls, then further downstream the Steephill Falls. The river takes in the right tributary Catfish Creek, and reaches Wawa, where it is crossed by the Algoma Central Railway branch line to Michipicoten Harbour and Highway 17. The river then passes over the Magpie Falls, and takes in the Michipicoten River just before its mouth at Michipicoten Bay on Lake Superior at the site of Michipicoten Provincial Park.

== Economy ==
There are also several hydroelectric plants on the river. The largest hydroelectric is located at Steephill Falls.

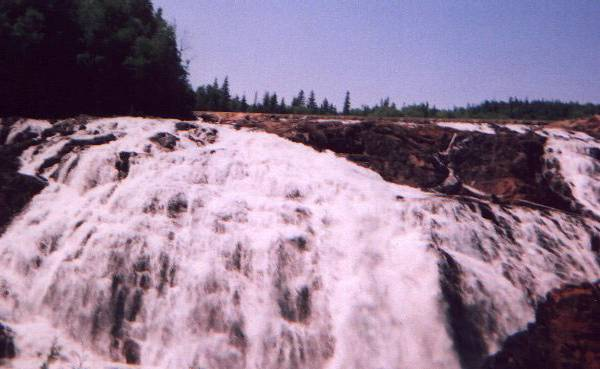
Scenic High Falls on the Magpie River

== Tributaries ==
- Michipicoten River (left)
- Catfish Creek (right)
- Evans Creek (right)
- Soderston Creek (right)
- Herman Creek (left)
- Hobon Creek (left)
- Peckerwood Creek (left)
- Tripoli Creek (right)

== Legal person ==
To protect the natural landmark, the Innu Council of Ekuanitshit and the Minganie Regional County Municipality declared the Mutuhekau Shipu a legal person in 2021. Now the river has nine rights, among them the right to flow, maintain biodiversity, be free from pollution, and to sue.

== See also ==
- List of rivers of Ontario
