= 2002 CPSL Canada Cup =

2002 Canada Cup
Tournament details
- Country: Canada
- Teams: 14

Final positions
- Champions: Ottawa Wizards (2nd title)
- Runners-up: Toronto Croatia

Tournament statistics
- Matches played: 24
- Goals scored: 81 (3.38 per match)

The 2002 Canada Cup (known as the Government of Canada Cup for sponsorship reasons) was the 5th edition of the Canadian Professional Soccer League's league cup tournament, running from late June through late September. Ottawa Wizards successfully defended the title after defeating Toronto Croatia 1-0 at Cove Road Stadium in London, Ontario. The competition format changed with the introduction of a qualifying round with a home and away two-game series instead of the traditional group stage format previously used by the league. The tournament received a title sponsor from the government of Canada after the league received a federal grant of $100,000. The original hosting rights were granted to Hamilton, but after failing to successfully organize the tournament, the responsibilities were given to London, which in return received a wild card match privilege. The decision to grant London the hosting rights produced controversy as originally Ottawa was selected by the CPSL executives to replace Hamilton, but was vetoed by the team owners as London was deemed a more reliable venue.

== First round ==
June 21, 2002	Metro Lions	3–2	Durham Flames	Toronto, Ontario
8:00 ET		(Report)		Stadium: Birchmount Stadium

July 21, 2002	Durham Flames	1–0	Metro Lions	Oshawa, Ontario
6:00 ET	Geron Duporte 74'	(Report)		Stadium: Oshawa Civic Stadium

3–3 on aggregate; Durham won on away goals.

June 22, 2002	London City	2–2	Brampton Hitmen	Exeter, Ontario
6:45 ET	Sandro Costantin 43'; Haidar Al-Shaibani 79'	(Report)	Joe Drajavic 46'; Roberto Bruni 84'	Stadium: Exeter Community Field

July 21, 2002	Brampton Hitmen	4–1	London City	Brampton, Ontario
7:30 ET	Milodrag Akmadzic 16'; Phil Ionadi 43'; Jusif Jawando 49'; Jeff Sousa 83'	(Report)	Gentian Dervishi 87'	Stadium: Victoria Park Stadium; Attendance: 120; Referee: Mike Lambert (OSA)

Brampton won 6–3 on aggregate.

July 1, 2002	Mississauga Olympians	2–1	York Region Shooters	Mississauga, Ontario
3:00 ET	Joevannie Peart 31'; Darren Tilley 82'	(Report)	Robert Black 85'	Stadium: Twin Arenas; Attendance: 60; Referee: Gord Arrowsmith (OSA)

July 28, 2002	York Region Shooters	1–2	Mississauga Olympians	Mississauga, Ontario
3:00 ET	Michael Cipriani 2'	(Report)	Darren Tilley 38', 95'	Stadium: Twin Arenas; Attendance: 60; Referee: Silviu Petrescu (OSA)

Mississauga won 4–2 on aggregate.

July 12, 2002	Vaughan Sun Devils	3–0	North York Astros	Vaughan, Ontario
8:00 ET				Stadium: Dufferin District Field

July 15, 2002	North York Astros	2–3	Vaughan Sun Devils	Toronto, Ontario
8:00 ET	Brook Azezew 80'; Kadian Lecky 88'	(Report)	Marco Antonucci 23'; Bobby Randhawa 69'; Bayete Smith 75'	Stadium: Esther Shiner Stadium; Attendance: 75; Referee: Silviu Petrescu (OSA)

Vaughan won 6–2 on aggregate.

July 20, 2002	Ottawa Wizards	5–0	Montreal Dynamites	Carp, Ontario
4:00 ET	Sanjeev Parmar 9'; Samir Karaga 69', 75'; David Cloutier 73' (o.g.); Brent Antoine 80'	(Report)		Stadium: OZ Stadium

August 4, 2002	Montreal Dynamites	3–2	Ottawa Wizards	Montreal, Quebec
3:00 ET	Gerry Pean 24'; Khalid Mensah 54', 78'	(Report)	Russell Shaw 28'; Kevin Nelson 47'	Stadium: Vanier Stadium

Ottawa won 7–3 on aggregate.

July 22, 2002	Toronto Supra	0–4	Toronto Croatia	Toronto, Ontario
9:00 ET	Pedro Dias 78'	(Report)	Mladen Dikic 22', 33', 37'; Brian Seljen 74'	Stadium: Centennial Park Stadium; Attendance: 80; Referee: Neil Schofield (OSA)

August 23, 2002	Toronto Croatia	2–1	Toronto Supra	Mississauga, Ontario
8:00 ET				Stadium: Memorial Park

Toronto Croatia won 6–1 on aggregate.

July 31, 2002	Hamilton Thunder	2–0	St. Catharines Wolves	Hamilton, Ontario
8:30 ET	Mark Wagenaar 14', 56'	(Report)		Stadium: Brian Timmis Stadium

August 14, 2002	St. Catharines Wolves	2–2	Hamilton Thunder	St. Catharines, Ontario
8:15 ET	Frank Zumpano 49'; Carlo Arghittu 94'	(Report)	Orlin Chalmers 11'; Mark Wagenaar 53'	Stadium: Club Roma Stadium; Attendance: 500

Hamilton won 4–2 on aggregate.

== Quarter-final ==
August 10, 2002	Durham Flames	1–5	Brampton Hitmen	Oshawa, Ontario
6:00 ET		(Report)		Stadium: Oshawa Civic Stadium

August 18, 2002	Brampton Hitmen	2–2	Durham Flames	Brampton, Ontario
8:00 ET	Kurt Mella 13'; Yousif Jawando 88'	(Report)		Stadium: Victoria Park Stadium

Brampton won 7–3 on aggregate.

September 9, 2002	Vaughan Sun Devils	2–1	Hamilton Thunder	Vaughan, Ontario
8:30 ET	Fitzroy Powell 15'; Gus Kouzmanis 17'	(Report)	Leonardo Laurito 1'	Stadium: Dufferin District Field; Attendance: 60; Referee: Danny Czetanovich (Ontario)

September 17, 2002	Hamilton Thunder	1–1	Vaughan Sun Devils	Hamilton, Ontario
8:30 ET				Stadium: Brian Timmis Stadium

Vaughan won 3–2 on aggregate.

September 11, 2002	Toronto Croatia	1–1	Mississauga Olympians	Mississauga, Ontario
8:00 ET	Nikola Andrijevic 93'	(Report)	Shawn Faria 5'	Stadium: Memorial Park; Attendance: 125; Referee: Steve Cahoon (Ontario)

September 22, 2002	Mississauga Olympians	0–3	Toronto Croatia	Mississauga, Ontario
8:00 ET				Stadium: Twin Arenas

Toronto won 4–1 on aggregate.

== Wild card ==
September 27, 2002	London City SC	0–3	Ottawa Wizards	London, Ontario
8:30 ET		(Report)	Peter Mponda 27', 85'; Abraham Osman 89'	Stadium: Cove Road Stadium

== Semi-final ==
September 28, 2002	Vaughan Sun Devils	2–2 (a.e.t.) (4–5 p)	Toronto Croatia	London, Ontario
5:45 ET	Tony Marshall 16'; Gus Kouzmanis 68'	(Report)	Josip Juric 21'; Robert Fran 95'	Stadium: Cove Road Stadium; Attendance: 250; Referee: Steve Mortimer (OSA)
	Penalties
	Marco Antonucci (penalty missed); Gus Kouzmanis (penalty scored); Willy Giummarra (penalty missed); Tom Kouzmanis (penalty scored); Dave McDonald (penalty scored); Bayete Smith (penalty scored); Mehmet Merhmedoglu (penalty missed)		Velimir Crljen (penalty scored); Robert Fran (penalty missed); Mladen Dikic (penalty scored); Hugo Alistud (penalty scored); Domagoj Sain (penalty missed); Josip Bucic (penalty scored); Paul Grguric (penalty scored)

September 28, 2002	Brampton Hitmen	0–1	Ottawa Wizards	London, Ontario
8:15 ET		(Report)	Abraham Osman 89'	Stadium: Cove Road Stadium; Attendance: 125; Referee: Gord Arrowsmith (OSA)

== Final ==
September 29
3:15 ET

Ottawa Wizards	1–0	Toronto Croatia
Kevin Nelson 66'	Report

Cove Road Stadium, London, Ontario
Attendance: 250
Referee: Mike Lambert (Ontario)

GK	1	(Burkina Faso) Sa Brahima Traore
RB	22	(Canada) Abraham Francois
CB	18	(Trinidad and Tobago) Shurland David	(c)
LB	24	(Trinidad and Tobago) Roger Groome
RM	4	(Canada) Russell Shaw	(substituted off) 15'
CM	7	(Malawi) Peter Mponda
CM	3	(Canada) Kwame Telemaque
CM	17	(Burkina Faso) Urbain Some	(substituted off) 74'
LM	21	(Trinidad and Tobago) Robin Hart
ST	8	(Trinidad and Tobago) Kevin Nelson	(substituted off) 84'
ST	9	(Uganda) Abraham Osman
Substitutes:
GK	29	(Jamaica) Hubert Busby Jr.
DF	5	(Canada) Simon Bonk	(substituted on) 79'
MF	2	(Canada) Danny Sanna	(substituted on) 15' (substituted off) 79'
MF	14	(Canada) Nicola Brkljaca	(substituted on) 74'
MF	15	(Canada) Sanjeev Parmar
MF	19	(Canada) Mario Andrijanic
FW	11	(Trinidad and Tobago) Brent Antoine	(substituted on) 84'
Manager:
(Germany) Klaus Linnenbruegger

GK	1	(Canada) George Azcurra
RB	5	(Canada) Robert Fran
CB	3	(Canada) Daniel Pilas
CB	4	(Canada) Domagoj Sain (c)
LB	2	(Canada) Adrian Azcurra
RM	8	(Argentina) Hugo Alistud
CM	9	(Canada) Mladen Dikic
CM	14	(Croatia) Velimir Crljen
LM	17	(Canada) Paul Grguric
ST	13	(Croatia) Josip Juric
ST	11	(Croatia) Ivica Sola
Substitutes:
MF	7	(Canada) Nikola Andrijevic
MF	15	(Canada) Joseph Lewe
MF	16	(Canada) Danan Baljic
FW	10	(Canada) Peter Curic
Manager:
(Croatia) Drago Santic

Assistant referees:
Amato DeLuca
Joe Fletcher
Fourth official:
Nick Minten
