= 2001 CPSL League Cup =

2001 League Cup
Tournament details
- Country: Canada
- Teams: 12

Final positions
- Champions: Ottawa Wizards (1st title)
- Runners-up: Toronto Supra

Tournament statistics
- Matches played: 27
- Goals scored: 91 (3.37 per match)

The 2001 CPSL League Cup (known as the OZ Optics Cup for sponsorship reasons) was the 4th edition of the Canadian Professional Soccer League's league cup tournament, running from June through late September. Ottawa Wizards defeated Toronto Supra 1-0 at OZ Optics Stadium in Ottawa, Ontario, formally ending the Toronto Olympians' league cup dynasty.

The format used in the competition was the traditional group stage based on the geographic locations of the teams and the furthest travel distances between clubs. The tournament received a title sponsor from OZ Optics and granted Ottawa the hosting rights with a wildcard match privilege.

== Group stage ==
=== Group A ===
Team	Pld	W	D	L	GF	GA	GD	Pts	Status
Ottawa Wizards	4	3	1	0	12	4	+8	10	Advanced to the semi-final
Montreal Dynamites	4	1	1	2	6	10	−4	4	
Durham Flames	4	0	2	2	7	11	−4	2	

16 June 2001
19:00

Ottawa Wizards	2–2	Durham Flames
Abraham Osman 52'; Parmar 63'	Report	Craig Patton 1'; Sullivan 50'

OZ Optics Stadium, Carp, Ontario
17 June 2001
16:00

Montreal Dynamites	3–2	Durham Flames
Jerry Pean 44', 65', 79'	Report	Kuzmanovski 61', Omar El-Behairy 69'

Vanier Stadium, Montreal

24 June 2001
17:00

Ottawa Wizards	4–0	Montreal Dynamites
Nelson, Abraham Osman,	Report

OZ Optics Stadium, Carp, Ontario
7 July 2001
16:00

Durham Flames	2–2	Montreal Dynamites
Matt Gennero 9'; Sullivan 52'	Report	Karl Stephen; Bruno Nue

Oshawa Civic Stadium, Oshawa, Ontario

18 July 2001
19:30

Montreal Dynamites	1–2	Ottawa Wizards
	Report

Vanier Stadium, Montreal, Quebec
5 August 2001
18:00

Durham Flames	1–4	Ottawa Wizards
Omar El-Behairy	Report	Mario Andrijanic; Samir Karaga; Nelson; Abraham Osman

Oshawa Civic Stadium, Oshawa, Ontario

=== Group B ===
Team	Pld	W	D	L	GF	GA	GD	Pts	Status
St. Catharines Roma	4	4	0	0	10	3	+7	12	Advanced to the semi-final
Glen Shields Sun Devils	4	1	1	2	9	12	−3	4	
Brampton Hitmen	4	0	1	3	7	11	−4	1	

27 June 2001
20:30

Brampton Hitmen	1–2	St. Catharines Roma
Mella 23'	Report	Frank Zumpano 49'; Joe Carbonara 61'

Victoria Park Stadium, Brampton, Ontario
Attendance: 400
Referee: Steve Cahoon (OSA)
18 July 2001
20:15

St. Catharines Roma	2–0	Brampton Hitmen
	Report

Club Roma Stadium, St. Catharines, Ontario

22 July 2001
19:00

Glen Shields Sun Devils	2–4	St. Catharines Roma
Budalić 80'; Gus Kouzmanis 89'	Report	John Sozio 10'; Frank Zumpano 26'; Joe Carbonara 31'; Tony Carbonara 39'

Dufferin District Field, Vaughan, Ontario
Attendance: 200
Referee: Colin Pintea (OSA)
25 July 2001
20:30

Brampton Hitmen	1–2	Glen Shields Sun Devils
Kurt Mella 35'	Report	Timo Garzon 17'; Gus Kouzmanis 69'

Victoria Park Stadium, Brampton, Ontario
Attendance: 250
Referee: Neil Schofield (OSA)

1 August 2001
20:15

St. Catharines Roma	2–0	Glen Shields Sun Devils
Joe Carbonara; Arghittu	Report

Club Roma Stadium, St. Catharines, Ontario
5 August 2001
19:00

Glen Shields Sun Devils	5–5	Brampton Hitmen
Gus Kouzmanis, Kurt Mella,	Report

Dufferin District Field, Vaughan, Ontario

=== Group C ===
Team	Pld	W	D	L	GF	GA	GD	Pts	Status
Toronto Supra	4	3	1	0	6	1	+5	10	Advanced to the semi-final
Toronto Croatia	4	2	0	2	7	4	+3	6	
London City	4	0	1	3	3	11	−8	1	

Originally, it was a 1-0 victory for Toronto, but was reversed by the league after the use of ineligible players.

6 July 2001
20:00

Toronto Croatia	0–1	Toronto Supra
	Report

Memorial Park, Mississauga, Ontario
15 July 2001
17:45

Toronto Supra	3–0	London City
Samuel Afriyie, Pedro Dias, Gamble	Report

Brockton Stadium, Toronto, Ontario

22 July 2001
16:00

London City	2–6	Toronto Croatia
Gebczynski; Tafaj	Report	Andrijevic; Peter Curic,, Robert Fran; Sasa Komecar

Cove Road Stadium, London, Ontario
Referee: Nick Rose (OSA)
27 July 2001
20:38

London City	1–1	Toronto Supra
Tafaj	Report	Paulo Valdez

Exeter Community Field, Exeter, Ontario
Attendance: 1200

3 August 2001
20:00

Toronto Croatia	1–0	London City
Mesanovic 15'	Report

Memorial Park, Mississauga, Ontario
26 August 2001
17:45

Toronto Supra	1–0	Toronto Croatia
Samuel Afriyie 24'	Report

Brockton Stadium, Toronto, Ontario
Attendance: 180
Referee: Manuel Orellano (OSA)

=== Group D ===
Team	Pld	W	D	L	GF	GA	GD	Pts	Status
Toronto Olympians	4	4	0	0	14	0	+14	12	Advanced to the semi-final
North York Astros	4	1	1	2	5	2	+3	4	
York Region Shooters	4	0	1	3	0	17	−17	1	

27 June 2001
19:00

York Region Shooters	0–0	North York Astros
	Report

Crosby Field, Richmond Hill, Ontario
4 July 2001
20:00

Toronto Olympians	8–0	York Region Shooters
Ron Belfon 1', Giummarra 10', Berdusco 21', 23', 41'; John Matas 25', 79'; Tony Marshall 38'	Report

Birchmount Stadium, Toronto, Ontario
Attendance: 40
Referee: Sonia Denoncourt (OSA)

11 July 2001
20:30

Toronto Olympians	1–0	North York Astros
Tommy Granic 75'	Report

Birchmount Stadium, Toronto, Ontario
Attendance: 40
Referee: Joe Likando (OSA)
15 July 2001
19:00

York Region Shooters	0–4	Toronto Olympians
	Report	Berdusco,, Kouzmanis

Crosby Field, Richmond Hill, Ontario

5 August 2001
19:00

North York Astros	0–1	Toronto Olympians
	Report	Angelo Pollastrone 73' (o.g.)

Esther Shiner Stadium, Toronto, Ontario
12 August 2001
19:00

North York Astros	5–0	York Region Shooters
	Report

Esther Shiner Stadium, Toronto, Ontario

== Semi-final ==
Originally a 1-0 victory for St. Catharines, but result reversed by league after use of ineligible players.

September 29, 2001	Ottawa Wizards	1–0	St. Catharines Roma	Ottawa, Ontario
15:00 ET		(Report)		Stadium: OZ Optics Stadium

September 29, 2001	Toronto Supra	2–1	Toronto Olympians	Ottawa, Ontario
17:00 ET	Paulo Valdez 30'; Christian Lombardo 87'	(Report)	Leo Marasovic 10'	Stadium: OZ Optics Stadium

== Final ==
September 30, 2001	Ottawa Wizards	1–0	Toronto Supra	Ottawa, Ontario
12:00 ET	Abraham Osman 81'	(Report)		Stadium: OZ Optics Stadium
