= 2002 Canadian Professional Soccer League season =

Canadian Professional Soccer League
- Season: 2002
- Champions: Ottawa Wizards
- Regular Season title: Ottawa Wizards (Eastern Conference); Toronto Croatia (Western Conference)
- Matches: 133
- Goals: 456 (3.43 per match)
- Top goalscorer: Darren Tilley (Mississauga Olympians)
- Best goalkeeper: George Azcurra
- Biggest home win: Ottawa Wizards 8-1 St. Catharines Wolves (July 7, 2002)
- Biggest away win: North York Astros 0-8 Mississauga Olympians (June 16, 2002)
- Highest scoring: Mississauga Olympians 6-4 St. Catharines Wolves (July 19, 2002)

The 2002 Canadian Professional Soccer League season was the fifth season for the Canadian Professional Soccer League. The season began on May 23, 2002, and concluded on October 20, 2002, with Ottawa Wizards becoming the first expansion franchise to win the CPSL Championship (known as the Rogers CPSL Cup for sponsorship reasons) by defeating the North York Astros 2–0. For the first time the final was hosted at Esther Shiner Stadium, which granted the hosts the North York Astros a wildcard match. As the league was divided into the Eastern and Western Conferences the Wizards clinched the Eastern title, while Toronto Croatia won the Western Conference. The expansion of the league saw the return of professional soccer to Hamilton, and the addition of another Toronto franchise. On February 26, 2002, the CPSL signed a player agreement deal with the Toronto Lynx of the USL A-League, which provided the Lynx access in order to use CPSL talent and provide players an opportunity to play at a higher level.

== Changes from 2001 season ==
For the second straight season the CPSL expanded to 14 clubs to include the Hamilton Thunder and Metro Lions. Due to the increase of teams the CPSL management split the league into two Conferences the Eastern and Western. The Toronto Olympians moved to Erin Mills, Mississauga, which opened the Scarborough territory to the Metro Lions. Changes occurred in the York Region territory with Glen Shields changing their team name to Vaughan Sun Devils in order to fully represent the city of Vaughan. Meanwhile, their rivals the York Region Shooters were sold to Tony De Thomasis, and relocated the team to their original home at Highland Park in Aurora. While former Hamilton Bulldogs president Cary Kaplan was hired as a Management Consultant for the league.

== Teams ==
Team	City	Stadium	Manager
Brampton Hitmen	Brampton, Ontario (Bramalea)	Victoria Park Stadium	Steve Nijjar
Durham Flames	Oshawa, Ontario (Vanier)	Oshawa Civic Stadium	Steve Hamill
London City	London, Ontario (Westmount)	Cove Road Stadium	Jurek Gebczynski
Hamilton Thunder	Hamilton, Ontario	Brian Timmis Stadium	Andrzej Jasinski
Metro Lions	Toronto, Ontario (Scarborough)	Birchmount Stadium	Anthony La Ferrara
Mississauga Olympians	Mississauga, Ontario (Erin Mills)	Erin Mills Twin Arenas	David Gee
Montreal Dynamites	Laval, Quebec	Centre Sportif Bois-de-Boulogne	Victor Petkov
North York Astros	Toronto, Ontario (North York)	Esther Shiner Stadium	Pavel Zaslavski; Dejan Gluščević
Ottawa Wizards	Ottawa, Ontario (Carp)	OZ Optics Stadium	Klaus Linnenbruegger
St. Catharines Wolves	St. Catharines, Ontario (Vansickle)	Club Roma Stadium	Lucio Ianiero
Toronto Croatia	Mississauga, Ontario (Streetsville)	Memorial Park	Drago Santic
Toronto Supra	Toronto, Ontario (Brockton)	Centennial Park Stadium	Victor Cameira
Vaughan Sun Devils	Vaughan, Ontario (Thornhill)	Dufferin District Field	Dave Benning
York Region Shooters	Aurora, Ontario (Aurora Village)	Highland Park	Vito Colangelo

=== Coaching changes ===
Team	Outgoing coach	Manner of departure	Date of vacancy	Position in table	Incoming coach	Date of appointment
Brampton Hitmen	Ed McLaughlin	replaced	July 4, 2002	4th, Western Conference	Steve Nijjar	July 5, 2002
Montreal Dynamites	Mohamed Hilen	resigned	August 29, 2002	2nd, Eastern Conference	Victor Petkov	August 30, 2002
Toronto Croatia	Zarko Brala	relieved	September 9, 2002	3rd, Western Conference	Drago Santic	September 18, 2002
Hamilton Thunder	Marko Maschke	resigned	September 19, 2002	2nd, Western Conference	Andrzej Jasinski	September 20, 2002

Location of CPSL teams outside of Toronto for the 2002 CPSL season.
Western Conference Eastern Conference
Location of CPSL teams in Toronto for the 2002 CPSL season.
Western Conference Eastern Conference

== Final standings ==
=== Eastern Conference ===
Pos	Team	Pld	W	D	L	GF	GA	GD	Pts	Qualification
1	Ottawa Wizards	19	15	2	2	55	13	+42	47	Qualification for Playoffs
2	Montreal Dynamites	19	11	3	5	44	34	+10	36	Qualification for Playoffs
3	Metro Lions	19	11	2	6	36	23	+13	35	Qualification for Playoffs
4	York Region Shooters	19	8	4	7	29	33	−4	28	
5	Durham Flames	19	7	2	10	28	44	−16	23	
6	Vaughan Sun Devils	19	6	11	2	27	35	−8	29	
7	Toronto Supra	19	4	4	11	23	48	−25	16	

Updated to match(es) played on October 14, 2001. Source: http://www.rocketrobinsoccerintoronto.com/reports02/02cpwk21.htm
Rules for classification: 1) points; 2) goal difference; 3) number of goals scored.

=== Western Conference ===
Pos	Team	Pld	W	D	L	GF	GA	GD	Pts	Qualification
1	Toronto Croatia	19	10	4	5	36	23	+13	34	Qualification for Playoffs
2	Mississauga Olympians	19	9	5	5	49	30	+19	32	Qualification for Playoffs
3	Hamilton Thunder	19	8	4	7	31	24	+7	28	Qualification for Playoffs
4	St. Catharines Roma Wolves	19	6	6	7	35	41	−6	24	
5	North York Astros	19	4	6	9	22	42	−20	18	Qualification for Playoffs
6	Brampton Hitmen	19	4	5	10	19	27	−8	17	
7	London City	19	2	7	10	22	39	−17	13	

Updated to match(es) played on October 14, 2001. Source: http://www.rocketrobinsoccerintoronto.com/reports02/02cpwk21.htm
Rules for classification: 1) points; 2) goal difference; 3) number of goals scored.

== Rogers CPSL Championship playoffs ==
=== Wildcard ===
October 8, 2002	Mississauga Olympians	3–2	Hamilton Thunder	Toronto, Ontario
8:00 ET	Tilley 62'; Fitzwilliams 68'; Diplacido 117'	(Report)	Jason Crnic 3'; O'Connor 25'	Stadium: Centennial Park Stadium; Attendance: 50; Referee: Manuel Orellano (Ontario

October 16, 2002	Montreal Dynamites	1–3	Metro Lions	Kingston, Ontario
9:00 ET	Kyt Selaidopoulos 30'	(Report)

October 18, 2002	North York Astros	3–0	Mississauga Olympians	Toronto, Ontario
8:05 ET	Ryan Thompson 11'; Maximiliano Andrada 58'; Gabriel Salguero 84'	(Report)		Stadium: Esther Shiner Stadium; Attendance: 100; Referee: Mike Lambert (Ontario

=== Semifinals ===
October 19, 2002	Ottawa Wizards	1–0	Metro Lions	Toronto, Ontario
2:05 ET	Samir Karaga 83'	(Report)		Stadium: Esther Shiner Stadium; Attendance: 125; Referee: Manuel Orellano (Ontario

October 19, 2002	Toronto Croatia	0–1	North York Astros	Toronto, Ontario
4:05 ET		(Report)	Hall 89'	Stadium: Esther Shiner Stadium; Attendance: 150; Referee: Domenic Rosetto (Ontario

=== Rogers CPSL Championship ===
October 20
2:05 ET

North York Astros	0–2	Ottawa Wizards
	Report	Hart 46'; Slobodan Ilic 89' (og)

Esther Shiner Stadium, Toronto, Ontario
Attendance: 450
Referee: Steve DePierro (Ontario)

GK	1	Luciano Miranda (c)
RB	21	Slobodan Ilic	(substituted off) 93'
CB	14	Kurt Ramsey
CB	2	Pablo Politi
LB	3	(Scotland) Ryan Thomson
RM	15	Zoltan Zsibok
CM	19	(Argentina) Gabriel Salguero	(substituted off) 87'
CM	16	(Russia) Andrei Malychenkov	(substituted off) 79'
LM	18	(Federal Republic of Yugoslavia) Dejan Gluscevic
ST	17	(Argentina) Guillermo Compton Hall
ST	7	Lukasz Krakowiak	(substituted off) 92'
Substitutes:
DF	5	Peter Zorbas
DF	4	Tom Covello	(substituted on) 92'
FW	6	Marvin Azzopardi	(substituted on) 79'
MF	8	Jean Pierre Melotte	(substituted on) 87'
DF	13	Gurbir Singh	(substituted on) 93'
MF	20	Maximiliano Andrada
Manager:
(Federal Republic of Yugoslavia) Dejan Gluscevic (Belarus) Pavel Zaslavski

GK	1	(Burkina Faso) Sa Brahima Traore
RB	3	(Canada) Kwame Telemaque
CB	18	(Trinidad and Tobago) Shurland David (c)
CB	22	(Canada) Abraham Francois
LB	23	(Canada) James MacMillan
RM	17	(Burkina Faso) Urbain Some
CM	7	(Malawi) Peter Mponda	(substituted off) 88'
CM	2	(Canada) Danny Sanna	(substituted off) 91'
LM	21	(Trinidad and Tobago) Robin Hart
CF	8	(Trinidad and Tobago) Kevin Nelson
CF	9	(Uganda) Abraham Osman
Substitutes:
GK	33	(Canada) Roberto Canales
DF	5	(Canada) Simon Bonk
DF	16	(Canada) Norm Gates
MF	4	(Canada) Russell Shaw	(substituted on) 91'
MF	14	(Canada) Nikola Brkljaca	(substituted on) 88'
FW	10	(Canada) Samir Karaga
FW	19	(Canada) Mario Andrijanic
Manager:
(Germany) Klaus Linnenbruegger

Rogers CPSL Championship MVP:

Guillermo Compton Hall (North York Astros)

Assistant referees:
Amato De Luca
Denise Robinson
Fourth official:
Vito Curalli

== All-Star Game ==
The 2002 CPSL All-Star match was arranged by the German consulate general in Toronto to have TSV 1860 Munich of the Bundesliga to come to Canada. London City head coach Jurek Gebcznyski was selected to assemble an All-Star roster with Dave Benning, Victor Cameria and Steve Nijjar serving as his assistant coaches. Jimmy Douglas was appointed the general manager for the team.

May 15, 2002
8:00 pm

CPSL All-Stars	0 - 6	TSV 1860 Munich
	Report	Roman Tyce 15'; Markus Schroth 18'; Paul Agostino 37'; Michael Wiesinger 42'; Martin Max 44'; Daniel Borimirov 54'

Budd Stadium, Kitchener, Ontario
Referee: Michael Lambert (Ontario)

GK	31	(Canada) Pieter Meuleman	(substituted off) 45'
RB	2	(Canada) Jason Faria
CB	3	(Canada) Danny Sanna
CB	4	(Canada) Peyvand Mossavat
LB	11	(Canada) Bayete Smith
RM	15	(Albania) Gentian Dervishi	(substituted off) 56'
CM	9	(Canada) Miles O'Conner
CM	12	(Uganda) Abraham Osman	(substituted off) 45'
LM	8	(Canada) Phil Ionadi
ST	14	(Canada) Carlo Arghittu	(substituted off) 68'
ST	16	(Canada) Jimmy Kuzmanovski	(substituted off) 58'
Substitutes:
GK	1	(Canada) Luciano Miranda	(substituted on) 45'
DF	5	(Canada) Orlando Rizzo	(substituted on) 56'
DF	6	(Canada) Tyler Hemming	(substituted on) 68'
MF	7	(Canada) Lucio Ianiero	(substituted on) 45'
MF	10	(Canada) David Mancini
FW	17	(Federal Republic of Yugoslavia) Dejan Gluscevic	(substituted on) 58'
FW	18	(Canada) Denny Dragonic
Manager:
(Poland) Jurek Gebczynski

GK	29	(Germany) Simon Jentzsch	(substituted off) 45'
RB	4	(Germany) Marco Kurz
CB	7	(Brazil) Rodrigo Barbosa Rodrigues Costa
LB	22	(Belgium) Didier Dheedene	(substituted off) 45'
RM	14	(Germany) Michael Wiesinger
CM	2	(Austria) Martin Stranzl
CM	17	(Bulgaria) Daniel Borimirov
LM	6	(Czech Republic) Roman Tyce
FW	21	(Germany) Markus Schroth
FW	9	(Germany) Martin Max
FW	18	(Australia) Paul Agostino	(substituted off) 45'
Substitutes:
GK	1	(Germany) Michael Hofmann
GK	31	(Germany) Jurgen Wittmann	(substituted on) 45'
DF	24	(Germany) Uwe Ehlers	(substituted on) 45'
DF	44	(Germany) Torben Hoffmann	(substituted on) 45'
DF	41	(Germany) Christian Holzer
MF	36	(Germany) Andreas Gorlitz
MF	42	(Germany) Stefan Kogler
MF	26	(Austria) Marcus Pürk
FW	25	(Germany) Achim Pfuderer
Manager:
(Austria) Peter Pacult

Assistant referees:
Steve Cahoon
Frank Marcello
Fourth official:
Steve DePierro

== 2002 scoring leaders ==
Full article: CSL Golden Boot

Position	Player's name	Nationality	Club	Goals
1	Darren Tilley	England	Mississauga Olympians	20
2	Kevin Nelson	Trinidad and Tobago	Ottawa Wizards	18
3	Mladen Dikic	Croatia	Toronto Croatia	14
4	Carlo Arghittu	Canada	St. Catharines Wolves	13
5	Gus Kouzmanis	Canada	Vaughan Sun Devils	13
6	Khalid Mensah	Canada	Montreal Dynamites	13
7	Abraham Osman	Uganda	Ottawa Wizards	12
8	Kevin De Serpa	Canada	Mississauga Olympians	8
9	Tom Kouzmanis	Canada	Vaughan Sun Devils	8
10	Kurt Mella	Canada	Brampton Hitmen	8

== CPSL Executive Committee ==
A list of the 2002 CPSL Executive Committee.

Position	Name	Nationality
President & Chairman:	Vincent Ursini	(Canada) Canadian
League Administrator/Director of Media:	Stan Adamson	(England) English
Director at Large:	Walter Kirchner	(Romania) Romanian
Director of Discipline:	Clifford Dell	(Canada) Canadian
Director of Officials:	Tony Camacho	(Portugal) Portuguese
Administrative Co-ordinator:	Josie Storto	(Canada) Canadian
Treasurer:	Peter Li Preti	(Canada) Canadian
Legal Counsel:	Ira Greenspoon	(Canada) Canadian

== Individual awards ==
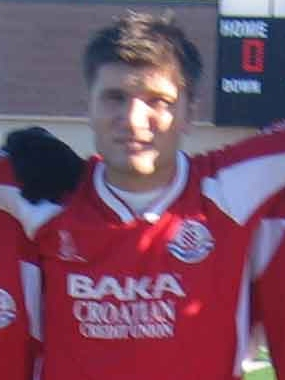
Domagoj Sain was named the Defender of the Year

The annual CPSL awards ceremony was held on October 20, 2002, at the Hollywood Princess Convention in Concord, Ontario. Where the Mississauga Olympians received the most accolades with three wins. Darren Tilley a former English football and USL A-League veteran was given both the CSL Golden Boot and Rookie of the Year. After accumulating the fewest card bookings they received the Fair Play award, their third in the club's history. Toronto Croatia went home with two awards with George Azcurra adding his third Goalkeeper of the Year award to his resume. While Domagoj Sain was named the Defender of the Year.

Abraham Osman of the Ottawa Wizards became the first player to receive the MVP in two straight seasons. After a mediocre start to the season the Metro Lions utilized the services of Aldwyn McGill as manager, who transformed the expansion franchise into a title contender. While Michael Lambert's work as a match official was recognized by the league with the Referee of the Year award.

Award	Player (Club)
CPSL Most Valuable Player	Abraham Osman (Ottawa Wizards)
CPSL Golden Boot	Darren Tilley (Mississauga Olympians)
CPSL Goalkeeper of the Year Award	George Azcurra (Toronto Croatia)
CPSL Defender of the Year Award	Domagoj Sain (Toronto Croatia)
CPSL Rookie of the Year Award	Darren Tilley (Mississauga Olympians)
CPSL Coach of the Year Award	Aldwyn McGill (Metro Lions)
CPSL Referee of the Year Award	Michael Lambert
CPSL Fair Play Award	Mississauga Olympians
