= List of Canadian Soccer League clubs =

The following clubs have played in the Canadian Soccer League since its formation in 1998 to the current season. CSL teams playing in the 2017 season are indicated in bold, while founding members of the Canadian Soccer League are shown in italics. As of the 2017 season a total of 37 teams have played in the Canadian Soccer League with seven teams (Hamilton Croatia, London City SC, North York Astros, Toronto Supra, Serbian White Eagles, St. Catharines Wolves, and Toronto Croatia) having played in the predecessor league the Canadian National Soccer League. Two of the eight founder members of the Canadian Soccer League are competing in the 2017 season.

== Table ==
Club	Location	Total seasons	Total spells	Longest spell	Seasons	Most recent finish	Highest finish	Top scorer
Brampton Stallions; Brampton Hitmen (2001–04)	Brampton (Bramalea)	6	1	6	2001–2006	2nd, National Division	2nd, National Division; CPSL Championship	Hugo Herrera (27)
Brampton City United; Metro Lions (2002–04); Oakville Blue Devils (2005–06); Canadian Lions (2007)	Brampton (Bramalea)	14	1	14	2002–2015	9th, First Division	1st, National Division; CPSL Championship	—
**Brantford Galaxy**	Brantford	4	2	**3**	2010–2012; **2015–**	5th	5th, First Division; CSL Championship	Ranko Golijanin (35)
**Burlington SC**	Burlington	4	2	**3**	2013–2015; **2017–**	2nd, Second Division	2nd, Second Division	Nicholas Lindsay (14)
Capital City F.C.	Ottawa	1	1	1	2011	3rd, First Division	3rd, First Division	Sullivan Silva (15)
Caribbean Selects	Toronto (Liberty Village)	1	1	1	2006	5th, International Division	5th, International Division	—
Durham Flames; Oshawa Flames (1999–00)	Oshawa (Vanier)	5	1	5	1999–2003	6th, Eastern Conference	5th, Eastern Conference	—
Durham Storm; Mississauga Olympians (2002–03); Toronto Olympians (1998–2001)	Oshawa (Vanier)	8	1	8	1998–2005	6th, Eastern Conference	1st CPSL Championship	Gus Kouzmanis (80)
**FC Ukraine United**	Toronto (Etobicoke)	2	1	**2**	**2016–**	1st, Second Division	1st, Second Division	Taras Hromyak; Sergiy Ivliev (15)
**FC Vorkuta**	Toronto (North York)	1	1	**1**	**2017–**	1st, First Division	1st, First Division	Sergiy Ivliev (13)
Hamilton City SC	Hamilton (Stoney Creek)	1	1	1	2016	6th, First Division	6th, First Division	Zdenko Jurčević (7)
Hamilton Croatia	Hamilton	1	1	1	2010	3rd, First Division	3rd, First Division	Aidan O'Keeffe (12)
Hamilton Thunder	Hamilton	4	1	4	2002–2005	1st, Western Conference	1st, Western Conference	—
Kingston FC	Kingston	4	1	4	2011–2014	3rd, First Division	1st, First Division	Guillaume Surot (40)
Laval Dynamites; Montreal Dynamites (2001–03)	Montreal (Laval)	5	2	3	2001–2003; 2005–2006	3rd, National Division	2nd, Eastern Conference	—
**London City SC**	London (Westmount)	20	1	**20**	**1998–**	8th, Second Division	4th	—
**Milton SC**	Milton (Timberlea)	4	1	**4**	**2014–**	6th, First Division	6th, First Division	Adnan Smajic (24)
Milltown F.C.	Milton (Clarke)	1	1	1	2010	4th, First Division	4th, First Division	Lesly St. Fleur (10)
Mississauga Eagles FC	Mississauga	2	1	2	2011–2012	10th, First Division	7th, First Division	—
Mississauga Eagles P.S.C.	Mississauga (Malton)	1	1	1	1998	7th	7th	—
Montreal Impact Academy	Montreal	3	1	3	2010–2012	2nd, First Division	2nd, First Division	—
Niagara United	Niagara Falls	5	1	5	2011–2015	12th, First Division	1st, Second Division	Derek Paterson (27)
North York Astros	Toronto (North York)	18	1	18	1998–2015	4th, First Division	2nd, National Division	—
Ottawa Wizards	Ottawa (Carp)	3	1	3	2001–2003	1st, Eastern Conference	1st, Eastern Conference; CPSL Championship	Kevin Nelson (50)
'Royal Toronto FC	Toronto (Discovery District)	1	1	1	2017	8th, First Division	8th, First Division	Luka Majstorović (4)
SC Toronto; Portugal FC (2008–2011); Portuguese Supra (2007); Toronto Supra (2001–2006)	Toronto (Brockton)	12	1	12	2001–2012	3rd, First Division	1st, First Division	Danny Amaral (55)
**Scarborough SC**	Toronto (Scarborough)	3	1	**3**	**2015–**	3rd, First Division	4th, First Division	Aleksandar Stojiljković (23)
**Serbian White Eagles**	Toronto (Etobicoke)	12	1	**12**	**2006–**	2nd, First Division	1st, International Division; CSL Championship	—
St. Catharines Wolves	St. Catharines (Vansickle)	16	1	16	1992–2013	11th, First Division	1st, National Division; CPSL Championship	Carlo Arghittu (90)
TFC Academy	Toronto (North York)	5	1	5	2008–2012	7th, First Division	4th, National Division	—
Toronto Atomic FC	Toronto (Etobicoke)	2	1	2	2015–2016	5th, First Division	5th, First Division	Ihor Melnyk (12)
Toronto Croatia	Toronto (Etobicoke)	18	1	18	1998–2015	2nd, First Division	1st, First Division; CSL Championship	—
Trois-Rivières Attak	Trois-Rivières	3	1	3	2007–2009	1st, National Division	1st, National Division; CSL Championship	Nicolas Lesage (27)
**SC Waterloo Region**	Waterloo	6	1	**6**	**2012–**	7th, First Division	4th, First Division; CSL Championship	Dražen Vuković (57)
Windsor Stars; Windsor Border Stars (2004–08)	Windsor	8	2	5	2004–2008; 2011–2013	6th, First Division	3rd, Western Conference	—
York Region Shooters (1998)	Aurora (Aurora Village)	5	1	5	1998–2002	4th, Eastern Conference	4th, Eastern Conference	—
**York Region Shooters**; Vaughan Italia Shooters (2006–09); Vaughan Shooters (2004–05); Vaughan Sun Devils (2002–03); Glen Shields Sun Devils (1999-01)	Vaughan (Maple)	20	1	**20**	**1998–**	3rd, First Division	1st, First Division; CSL Championship	—

== Map ==
Location of Canadian Soccer League clubs since 1998
Current members (2017) in **bold**
Greater Toronto

Locations of Quebec teams
