= 2003 Canadian Professional Soccer League season =

Canadian Professional Soccer League
- Season: 2003
- Champions: Brampton Hitmen
- Regular Season title: Ottawa Wizards (Eastern Conference); Hamilton Thunder (Western Conference)
- Matches: 117
- Goals: 405 (3.46 per match)
- Top goalscorer: Carlo Arghittu (St. Catharines Wolves)
- Best goalkeeper: Simon Eaddy
- Biggest home win: Toronto Supra 9-1 Durham Flames (September 24, 2003)
- Biggest away win: Durham Flames 2-5 Metro Lions (September 14, 2003); Durham Flames 4-5 Vaughan Sun Devils (August 10, 2003); Durham Flames 2-5 Ottawa Wizards (July 19, 2003)

The 2003 Canadian Professional Soccer League season was the sixth season for the Canadian Professional Soccer League. The season began on May 24, 2003 and concluded on October 5, 2003 with the Brampton Hitmen defeating Vaughan Sun Devils 1-0 to capture the CPSL Championship (known as the Rogers CPSL Cup for sponsorship reasons). The victory marked Brampton's first championship title, and the final was played at Cove Road Stadium in London, Ontario. During the regular season the Ottawa Wizards and the Hamilton Thunder won their respective conferences. Ottawa became the second CPSL franchise to go undefeated throughout the regular season.

Unfortunately the season was plagued with controversy as the Wizards withdrew from the playoff competition, due to a dispute with the CPSL Executive Committee. Another controversy stemmed from a quarterfinal match between Brampton and Toronto Croatia, where Toronto won the match on penalties, but was reversed by the league due to Toronto using an ineligible coach and general manager. On a positive note the league's television program the CPSL Soccer Show recorded the highest ratings of any other Sunday program shown on Rogers TV.

== Changes from 2002 season ==
The 2003 season saw the league decrease by one team due to the fact that the York Region Shooters merged with the Vaughan Sun Devils to unite the York Region territory. The Montreal Dynamites moved to the Montreal suburb of Laval and changed their team name accordingly.

== Teams ==
Team	City	Stadium	Manager
Brampton Hitmen	Brampton, Ontario (Bramalea)	Victoria Park Stadium	Steve Nijjar
Durham Flames	Oshawa, Ontario (Vanier)	Oshawa Civic Stadium	Steve Hamill
London City	London, Ontario (Westmount)	Cove Road Stadium	Harry Gauss
Hamilton Thunder	Hamilton, Ontario	Brian Timmis Stadium	Manuel Gomes
Metro Lions	Toronto, Ontario (Scarborough)	Birchmount Stadium	Aldwyn McGill
Mississauga Olympians	Mississauga, Ontario (Erin Mills)	Erin Mills Twin Arenas	Darren Tilley; Tony Laferrara
Laval Dynamites	Laval, Quebec	Centre Sportif Bois-de-Boulogne	Jawad El Andaloussi
North York Astros	Toronto, Ontario (North York)	Esther Shiner Stadium	Pavel Zaslavski
Ottawa Wizards	Ottawa, Ontario (Carp)	OZ Optics Stadium	Klaus Linnenbruegger
St. Catharines Wolves	St. Catharines, Ontario (Vansickle)	Club Roma Stadium	Lucio Ianiero
Toronto Croatia	Mississauga, Ontario (Streetsville)	Memorial Park	Velimir Crljen
Toronto Supra	Toronto, Ontario (Brockton)	Centennial Park Stadium	José Testas
Vaughan Sun Devils	Vaughan, Ontario (Thornhill)	Dufferin District Field	Dave Benning

=== Coaching changes ===
Team	Outgoing coach	Manner of departure	Date of vacancy	Position in table	Incoming coach	Date of appointment
Hamilton Thunder	Duncan Wilde	resigned	July 22, 2003	1st, Western Conference	Ivan Marković	July 22, 2003
Hamilton Thunder	Ivan Marković	resigned	August 7, 2003	2nd, Western Conference	Manuel Gomes	August 7, 2003
Ottawa Wizards	Hubert Busby Jr.	resigned	September 10, 2003	1st, Eastern Conference	Klaus Linnenbruegger	September 11, 2003

Location of CPSL teams outside of Toronto for the 2003 CPSL season.
Western Conference Eastern Conference
Location of CPSL teams in Toronto for the 2003 CPSL season.
Western Conference Eastern Conference

== Final standings ==
=== Eastern Conference ===
Pos	Team	Pld	W	D	L	GF	GA	GD	Pts	Qualification
1	Ottawa Wizards	18	13	5	0	53	10	+43	44	Qualification for Playoffs
2	Toronto Supra	18	10	6	2	50	29	+21	36	Qualification for Playoffs
3	Vaughan Sun Devils	18	7	7	4	41	30	+11	28	Qualification for Playoffs
4	Laval Dynamites	18	8	3	7	33	41	−8	27	
5	Metro Lions	18	5	3	10	26	29	−3	18	
6	Durham Flames	18	1	1	16	28	73	−45	4	

Updated to match(es) played on October 2, 2003. Source: http://www.rocketrobinsoccerintoronto.com/reports03/03cpwkfn.htm
Rules for classification: 1) points; 2) goal difference; 3) number of goals scored.

=== Western Conference ===
Pos	Team	Pld	W	D	L	GF	GA	GD	Pts	Qualification
1	Hamilton Thunder	18	11	4	3	38	19	+19	37	Qualification for Playoffs
2	Brampton Hitmen	18	10	3	5	38	25	+13	33	Qualification for Playoffs
3	Toronto Croatia	18	9	1	8	27	30	−3	28	Qualification for Playoffs
4	St. Catharines Roma Wolves	18	8	2	8	26	34	−8	26	
5	North York Astros	18	4	5	9	20	33	−13	17	
6	Mississauga Olympians	18	4	4	10	19	30	−11	16	
7	London City	18	3	4	11	26	42	−16	13	

Updated to match(es) played on October 2, 2003. Source: http://www.rocketrobinsoccerintoronto.com/reports03/03cpwkfn.htm
Rules for classification: 1) points; 2) goal difference; 3) number of goals scored.

== Rogers CPSL Championship playoffs ==
=== Quarterfinals ===
September 30, 2003	Brampton Hitmen	1–1 (a.e.t.) (3–4 p)	Toronto Croatia	Brampton, Ontario
8:30 ET	Ruben Flores 36'	(Report)	Orlin Chalmers 3'	Stadium: Victoria Park Stadium; Attendance: 150; Referee: Manuel Orellano (Ontario
	Penalties
	Hugo Herrera (penalty missed); Jonathan Bustamante (penalty scored); Maximiliano Andrada (penalty scored); Adolfo Mella (penalty scored); Phil Ionadi (penalty missed)		Orlin Chalmers (penalty scored); Antonijo Zupan (penalty scored); Hayden Fitzwilliams (penalty scored); Kevin Rickets (penalty scored); Jure Pavic (penalty missed)

October 1, 2003	Toronto Supra	3–4 (a.e.t.)	Vaughan Sun Devils	Toronto, Ontario
6:45 ET	Michael Diluca 38'; Danny Amaral 73'; Danny Amaral 92'	(Report)	Bayete Smith 41'; Elvis Thomas 44'; Aundrea Rollins 90'; Aundrea Rollins 100'	Stadium: Centennial Park Stadium; Attendance: 85; Referee: Frank Marciello (Ontario

=== Semifinals ===
October 3, 2003	London City	1–1 (a.e.t.) (3–5 p)	Brampton Hitmen	London, Ontario
8:30 ET	Atilla Salamon 83'	(Report)	Hugo Herrera 37'	Stadium: Cove Road Stadium
	Penalties
	Stu Pow (penalty scored); Haidar Al-Shaïbani (penalty scored); unknown (penalty missed); Erik Elmauer (penalty missed)		Roy Blanche (penalty scored); Adolfo Mella (penalty scored); Kurt Mella (penalty scored); Hugo Herrera (penalty scored); Ruben Flores (penalty scored)

October 4, 2003	Hamilton Thunder	0–2	Vaughan Sun Devils	London, Ontario
5:30 ET		(Report)	Matthew Palleschi 10'; Bayete Smith 44'	Stadium: Cove Road Stadium; Attendance: 175; Referee: Angelo Gertzakis (Ontario

=== Rogers CPSL Championship ===
October 5
3:15 ET

Vaughan Sun Devils	0–1	Brampton Hitmen
	Report	Kurt Mella 27'

Cove Road Stadium, London, Ontario
Attendance: 175
Referee: Michael Lambert (Ontario)

GK	1	Rob Tilley
RB	22	(Canada) Angelo Pollastrone
CB	4	Jorge Molina	(substituted off) 90'
LB	25	Danny Sanna
RM	11	(Canada) Cameron Medwin
CM	5	Tony Marshall	(substituted off) 76'
CM	6	Chris Turner
CM	10	(Canada) Willy Giummarra	(substituted off) 61'
LM	7	Aundrea Rollins
ST	24	(Canada) Matthew Palleschi
ST	18	(Canada) Joey Todaro	(substituted off) 64'
Substitutes:
DF	16	Wilson Hugo	(substituted on) 76'
DF	17	Fitzroy Powell
MF	9	(Canada) Jason De Thomasis
MF	23	Ricardo Forno	(substituted on) 61'
FW	13	(Canada) Paul Sinisi	(substituted on) 90'
FW	14	Eke Chibueze
FW	20	Lorenzo Sibio	(substituted on) 64'
Manager:
(Italy) Tony De Thomasis

GK	1	(Canada) Roy Blanche
RB	19	Sean Roberts (c)
CB	11	(Canada) Alvaro Vaquez
LB	5	(Croatia) Milodrag Akmadzic
RM	18	Lovemore Ncube
CM	6	Robert Fran
CM	12	(Argentina) Jonathan Bustamante
LM	2	Maximiliano Andrada
FW	10	(Canada) Adolfo Mella	(substituted off) 92'
FW	3	(Argentina) Hugo Herrera
FW	17	Kurt Mella	(substituted off) 56'
Substitutes:
GK	0	Ricardo Esgro
DF	7	Diego Da Silva
DF	9	(Canada) Sean Holmes
MF	15	Scott Houston
FW	20	Yusif Deem Jamamdo	(substituted on) 92'
FW	13	(Canada) Phil Ionadi	(substituted on) 56' (substituted off) 89'
FW	14	(Mexico) Ruben Flores	(substituted on) 89'
Manager:
(Canada) Pernell Mason

Assistant referees:
Amato De Luca
Joe Fletcher
Fourth official:
Silviu Petrescu

== 2003 scoring leaders ==
Full article: CSL Golden Boot

Position	Player's name	Nationality	Club	Goals
1	Carlo Arghittu	Canada	St. Catharines Wolves	18
2	Danny Amaral	Canada	Toronto Supra	17
2	Michael Diluca	Canada	Toronto Supra	17
3	Jahmo Welch	Canada	Durham Flames	13
4	Phil Ionadi	Canada	Brampton Hitmen	12
5	Charles Gbeke	Canada	Ottawa Wizards	10
5	Hugo Herrera	Argentina	Brampton Hitmen	10
5	Joey Todaro	Canada	Vaughan Sun Devils	10
6	Darryl Gomez	Saint Kitts and Nevis	Metro Lions	9
6	Alen Marcina	Canada	Ottawa Wizards	9
6	Kevin Nelson	Trinidad and Tobago	Ottawa Wizards	9

== CPSL Executive Committee ==
A list of the 2003 CPSL Executive Committee.

Position	Name	Nationality
President & Chairman:	Vincent Ursini	(Canada) Canadian
League Administrator/Director of Media:	Stan Adamson	(England) English
Director at Large:	Walter Kirchner	(Romania) Romanian
Director of Discipline:	Clifford Dell	(Canada) Canadian
Director of Officials:	Tony Camacho	(Portugal) Portuguese
Administrative Co-ordinator:	Josie Storto	(Canada) Canadian
Community Services:	Peter Li Preti	(Canada) Canadian
Legal Counsel:	Ira Greenspoon	(Canada) Canadian
Marketing:	Cary Kaplan	(Canada) Canadian

== Individual awards ==
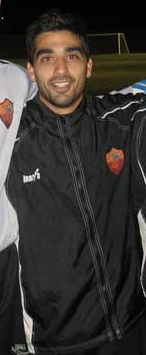
Carlo Arghittu won the CSL Golden Boot

The annual CPSL awards ceremony was held at German-Canadian Club on October 5, 2003 in London, Ontario. The Ottawa Wizards finished on top with the most wins with two awards. The undefeated Eastern Conference champions produced the Rookie of the Year with McDonald Yobe, a former Malawian international. After conceding the lowest number of goals the league voted New Zealand journeyman Simon Eaddy with the Goalkeeper of the Year award. Phil Ionadi a former CNSL and USL A-League veteran captained the Brampton Hitmen to a CPSL Championship, and in returned was named the MVP.

Carlo Arghittu of St. Catharines Wolves another former CNSL and USL A-League veteran was given the Golden Boot for finishing as the league's top goalscorer. Domagoj Sain was given his second consecutive Defender of the Year award. After a disastrous 2002 season Toronto Supra brought in Jose Testas a former Primeira Liga, and Segunda Divisão player to manage the club. Testas immediately changed the club into a championship contender by finishing second in their division, and for his achievement was granted the Coach of the Year award. The Durham Flames received their second Fair Play award for being the most disciplined team. While Michael Lambert who officiated the championship final was given his second Referee of the Year award.

Award	Player (Club)
CPSL Most Valuable Player	Phil Ionadi (Brampton Hitmen)
CPSL Golden Boot	Carlo Arghittu (St. Catharines Wolves)
CPSL Goalkeeper of the Year Award	Simon Eaddy (Ottawa Wizards)
CPSL Defender of the Year Award	Domagoj Sain (Toronto Croatia)
CPSL Rookie of the Year Award	McDonald Yobe (Ottawa Wizards)
CPSL Coach of the Year Award	José Testas (Toronto Supra)
CPSL Referee of the Year Award	Michael Lambert
CPSL Fair Play Award	Durham Flames
