= Guillermo Compton Hall =

Argentinian footballer

Personal information
- Place of birth: Buenos Aires, Argentina
- Position: Forward

Senior career*
Years	Team	Apps	(Gls)
2000–2002	Deportivo Riestra		
2002–2004	North York Astros		

Managerial career
- 2026–: DKSC Pro
- * Club domestic league appearances and goals

Guillermo Compton Hall (born 1973) is an Argentinian former footballer and manager for DKSC Pro in the United Premier Soccer League.

== Club career ==
Hall began his career in the youth ranks of Club Atlético River Plate. In 2000, he played for Deportivo Riestra. In 2002, he played abroad in the Canadian Professional Soccer League with the North York Astros. He helped North York secure a playoff berth and appeared in the opening match against the Mississauga Olympians. In the next round, he scored the winning goal against Toronto Croatia, which advanced the team to the championship. In the championship final, the Ottawa Wizards defeated North York, and he was named the championship final MVP.

Hall re-signed with North York for the 2003 season. However, he missed the majority of the season due to an injury. He played his final season with North York in 2004.

== Managerial career ==
After the 2004 season, Hall became the technical director for Club Atlético Vélez Sarsfield. In 2013, he became the youth coordinator for Club Atlético Aldosivi. In 2014, he was a candidate as the manager for the Puerto Rico national football team. Despite being considered for the Puerto Rican position, he was ruled out. After three seasons with Atlético Aldosivi, he returned to Vélez Sarsfield to become a youth coach.

In 2026, he became the head coach for DKSC Pro in the United Premier Soccer League.

== Honours ==
North York Astros

- CPSL Championship runner-up: 2002

Individual

- CPSL Championship MVP: 2002
