= Richard Goddard (footballer) =

Trinidad and Tobago footballer

Personal information
- Full name: Richard Anthony Goddard
- Date of birth: 30 January 1978 (age 48)
- Place of birth: Scarborough, Tobago, Trinidad and Tobago
- Height: 5 ft 11 in (1.80 m)
- Position: Goalkeeper

Team information
- Current team: Mountain WFC (U-16 Girls head coach)

College career
Years	Team	Apps	(Gls)
1997–2000	Roberts Wesleyan Raiders		

Senior career*
Years	Team	Apps	(Gls)
2001	Ottawa Wizards	21	(0)
2002	Charlotte Eagles	27	(0)
2004–2006	Toronto Lynx	22	(0)
2007–2008	Vancouver Whitecaps	11	(0)

International career
1996–1998	Trinidad & Tobago U-20	20	(0)
1999–2002	Trinidad and Tobago	10	(0)

Managerial career
- 2006: St. Clair's Coaching School (Goalkeeper Coach)
- 2007: North Shore Soccer Development Centre (G. C.)
- 2008: University of Ottawa (G. C.)
- 2008–: Mountain WFC (U-16 Girls)
- * Club domestic league appearances and goals

Richard Anthony Goddard (born 30 January 1978) is a former Trinidad and Tobago football goalkeeper who last played for the Vancouver Whitecaps. He has served as Senior Development and Goalkeeper Coach for North Vancouver Football Club and is currently Head Football Development Coach for Bishop's High School in Trinidad and Tobago.

== Playing career ==
He played college soccer with Roberts Wesleyan College from 1999 to 2001, where he was a 3 time NAIA All-American, NCCAA All-American, and 2-time NAIA Region IX Player of the Year.

Goddard began his pro career in 2001 when he signed for the Ottawa Wizards of the Canadian Professional Soccer League. He was part of the Ottawa team that won the double – Regular Season Championship and OZ Optics Cup, and led them to a 20–2 record. In 2002, he was signed by the Charlotte Eagles of the USL A-League. In his rookie season, he led the Eagles to the playoffs for 2nd straight season, started 27 of 28 regular season matches, accumulating a 10–13–4 record and a 1.59 GAA with 3 shutouts, and he was named twice Goalkeeper of the Week.

In 2004 Goddard signed for the Toronto Lynx where he served as a backup to Bryheem Hancock for most of the season. He made his debut in 5–1 victory over the Puerto Rico Islanders on 6 June. But on 30 June he was released from his contract after struggling to hold a starting position. The following season he re-signed with the Lynx under new coach Hubert Busby Jr. Before the commencement of the 2006 season he practiced with Rochester Rhinos, but failed to secure a contract. He returned for his third and final season with Toronto in 2006.

In 2007, Goddard signed with the 2006 USL Division 1 champion the Vancouver Whitecaps. He competed for a starting position with Matt Nelson, and Lutz Pfannenstiel, but eventually, he served as backup to Nelson. After the conclusion of the season, he was released from his contract.

Goddard was brought back into the 2008 Vancouver Whitecaps team early in the season due to an injury to their starting GK Jay Nolly by new coach Teitur Thordarson, but was released just before the USL Division 1 roster freeze deadline.

== Coaching career ==
Beside works as Goalkeeper Coach by North Shore Soccer Development Centre, he was trained at St. Clair's Coaching School, Tobago. He was a member, along with Tab Ramos, of the All-America Soccer Workshop at Best Western Lehigh Valley Hotel & Conference Center on Routes 22 and 512 in Bethlehem, Pa. He was the Head coach, of the U-16 Girls for Mountain WFC, and was formerly a Goalkeeper Coach at University of Ottawa in 2003. In 2003, he was the head coach of the Ottawa Internationals U18 Girls in the Ligue Soccer Elite du Quebec (LSEQ) and assistant/goalkeeper coach for the University of Ottawa Women's team that finished second in the CIS. In 2006 Goddard joined the University of Toronto Varsity Blues Women's Soccer Program as their Goalkeeper Coach. The Varsity Blues were knocked out in the Ontario semis.

Goddard is currently working as the Head Football Development Coach for Bishop's High School, Tobago since 2012 (his alma matar).

== Awards ==
Ottawa Wizards

- Rogers Cup: 2001
- Open Canada Cup: 2001

Toronto Lynx

- Open Canada Cup runner-up: 2006
- Voyageurs Cup runner-up: 2006

== Personal life ==
Richard is the brother-in-law of former Trinidad and Tobago footballer Wendell Moore and the uncle of the US youth national player Shaquell Moore.
