= Roger Groome =

Trinidadian former footballer

Personal information
- Full name: Roger Groome
- Place of birth: Trinidad and Tobago
- Position: Defender

Youth career
- 1998–2002: Roberts Wesleyan College

Senior career*
Years	Team	Apps	(Gls)
2002–2003	Charlotte Eagles	7	(0)
2002	→Ottawa Wizards (loan)	13	(2)

Managerial career
- 2016: Roberts Wesleyan College (interim coach)
- * Club domestic league appearances and goals as of 4 March 2018

Roger Groome is a Trinidadian former footballer who played in the USL A-League, Canadian Professional Soccer League, and served as a head coach at the college level.

== Playing career ==
Groome played college soccer in 1998 with Roberts Wesleyan College. In 2002, he played in the USL A-League with Charlotte Eagles, where he appeared in seven matches. He was later loaned to the Ottawa Wizards in the Canadian Professional Soccer League. In his debut season with Ottawa he secured a treble with the organization. After his retirement from professional soccer he made the transition to managing serving as an interim coach for Roberts Wesleyan College, and as an assistant coach for RIT Tigers.

== Honors ==
=== Ottawa Wizards ===
- CPSL Championship (1): 2002
- Open Canada Cup (1): 2002
- Canadian Professional Soccer League Eastern Conference Champions (2): 2002
