= Klaus Linnenbruegger =

German footballer and manager

Personal information
- Full name: Klaus Linnenbruegger
- Place of birth: Bielefeld, West Germany

Senior career*
Years	Team	Apps	(Gls)
1967–1971	VFB03 Bielefeld		

Managerial career
- 2002: Ottawa Wizards
- 2003: Ottawa Wizards
- 2011: Ottawa Fury (assistant coach)
- 2011–2012: Ottawa Fury (interim coach)
- * Club domestic league appearances and goals

Klaus Linnenbruegger is a German former footballer and coach who briefly played professionally in Germany and coached Canadian clubs.

== Club career ==
=== Early career ===
Linnenbruegger began his professional career in his native city of Bielefeld with VFB03 Bielefeld at the junior level and finally at the senior level.

=== Canada ===
In 1971, he emigrated to Canada and landed in Ottawa, Ontario, where he initially played in the local circuit known as the Ottawa and District Soccer Association's first division with Ottawa Centennials.

He played in the inter-provincial Quebec National Soccer League in 1973 after signing with Ottawa St.Anthony Italia. Linnenbruegger re-signed with Ottawa for the 1974 season. In the 1975 season, he finished as Ottawa's top goalscorer and assisted the team in securing a playoff berth. In the opening round of the postseason, he contributed two goals against St. Viataeur, which advanced the club to the next round. Ultimately, St. Anthony would secure the championship title after defeating Haitiana, where Linnenbruegger scored a goal in a 4-2 victory.

Ottawa would re-sign Linnenbruegger for the 1976 season. Throughout the season, he participated in the O'Keefe Cup, which determined Quebec's entry in the national Challenge Trophy tournament. He played in the semifinal round of the tournament, where he recorded a goal against Montreal Elio Blues, and Ottawa advanced to the finals. St. Anthony would secure the title after defeating Montreal Lachine.

=== Maple Leaf Almrausch ===
After four seasons with Ottawa St. Anthony, he departed from the club in order to return to the Ottawa and District League to serve in the capacity of a player-coach for Ottawa Maple Leaf Almrausch. In his debut season at the helm, he led the team to a city championship and the league cup. He returned for the 1978 season in the same role. In his second season with Ottawa, he successfully defended the league title and also added the Eastern Ontario Senior Challenge Cup. In 1979, during the winter season, he led the indoor team to the championship finals, where they were defeated by the Ottawa Royals. In 1980, Ottawa qualified for the Challenge Trophy tournament, where in the semifinal round, Linnenbruegger contributed a goal against Halifax City Privateers, which helped the team advance to the finals. In the national tournament final, Ottawa was defeated by Saint John Drydock.

== Managerial career ==
Linnenbruegger's first experience with coaching occurred in the Ottawa and District League with Maple Leaf Almrausch as a player-coach throughout the late 1970s.

=== Ottawa Wizards ===
He returned to managing in 2002 to become head coach for the Ottawa Wizards in the inter-provincial Canadian Professional Soccer League. In his first tenure with Ottawa, he led the club to a league treble. In the Canada Cup tournament, the Wizards defeated Toronto Croatia for the title. In the postseason, he guided Ottawa to a championship title after defeating the North York Astros. Linnenbruegger would be reinstated as head coach for Ottawa in early September of 2003 after the departure of Hubert Busby, Jr. The Wizards would clinch their division and secure a playoff berth.

=== Ottawa Fury ===
In 2011, he returned to the coaching scene as an assistant coach under head coach Steve Payne for the Ottawa Fury in the American-based USL Premier Development League. After the dismissal of Steve Payne midway through the season, he was named interim head coach on June 17, 2011. Ultimately, the Fury failed to secure a playoff berth. After the conclusion of the season, he was succeeded by Stephen O'Kane.

== Honors ==
=== Manager ===
Ottawa Wizards

- CPSL Championship: 2002
- Open Canada Cup: 2002
- Canadian Professional Soccer League Eastern Conference: 2002, 2003
