= Rubén Flores =

Mexican footballer and manager (born 1968)

Personal information
- Full name: Rubén Flores Gómez
- Date of birth: 3 October 1968 (age 58)
- Place of birth: Mexico City, Mexico
- Position: Forward

Youth career
- 1985–1988: Atlante/Cuautla

Senior career*
Years	Team	Apps	(Gls)
1988–1989	Irapuato	11	(1)
1989–1990	Atlante	7	(1)
1990–1991	Cruz Azul		
1994–1995	Caimanes de Tabasco		
2003	Brampton Hitmen		

Managerial career
- 2012: Hamilton Rage (assistant coach)
- 2013: K-W United (women)
- 2014–2021: Cayman Islands (women)
- * Club domestic league appearances and goals

Rubén Flores Gómez (born 3 October 1968) is a Mexican former professional footballer and was most recently the manager of the Cayman Islands women's national team.

== Playing career ==
Flores had a stint in the Mexican Primera División with Atlante where he appeared in a total of 11 matches and recorded one goal. In 2003, he was signed by the Brampton Hitmen of the Canadian Professional Soccer League. He scored his first goal for the organization on 4 July 2003 in a 2–0 victory over Toronto Croatia. In the first round of the postseason the Hitmen faced Toronto Croatia, and Flores scored the equalizing goal to conclude the match to a 1–1 draw. The game went into penalties with Toronto winning 4–3 in the shootout. After Toronto Croatia was caught fielding an illegal player the league reversed the result and Brampton advanced to the next round.

Brampton's next opponents would end up being London City, where once again the match went into penalties with Flores contributing a successful penalty kick, and the match concluding in a 5–3 victory. He featured in CPSL Championship match against Vaughan Sun Devils coming on as a substitute for team captain Phil Ionadi. Brampton would end up winning the match by a score of 1–0, thus marking the franchise's first Championship.

== Coaching career ==
Flores retired from competitive soccer after the 2003 season and served as an Ontario Soccer Association Provincial and Regional Head Coach from 2005 till 2011 debuting with the Burlington Bulldogs 88's. In 2011, he was appointed Technical Director for Guelph Soccer. In 2012, he served as assistant coach under Brett Mosen for Hamilton Rage of the Premier Development League.

On 26 February 2013 he was appointed the first head coach for K-W United for the USL W-League. After controversy regarding his professional soccer resume, Flores was dismissed from his post of head coach. On 22 May 2014, he was named the head coach for the Cayman Islands women's national football team.

== Personal life ==
Flores is married to a Canadian woman of English descent and they have three children, who are also footballers: Silvana, who was runner-up of the 2018 FIFA U-17 Women's World Cup with Mexico and has capped at senior level; Marcelo, who debuted for Canada on March 28, 2026 in an international friendly against Iceland, and Tatiana, who was called up to the Mexico women's national under–15 team.

== Honours ==
Brampton Hitmen

- CPSL Championship: 2003
