= Urbain Some =

Burkinabé footballer (born 1979)

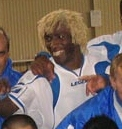
- Some in 2006

Personal information
- Date of birth: 20 February 1979 (age 47)
- Place of birth: Republic of Upper Volta
- Height: 1.78 m (5 ft 10 in)
- Position: Midfielder

Senior career*
Years	Team	Apps	(Gls)
1997–2001	USFA Ouagadougou		
2002–2003	Ottawa Wizards	30	(19)
2004	Ottawa St. Anthony Italia		
2005	Toronto Lynx	2	(1)
2006	Ottawa St. Anthony Italia		

International career
1998–2000	Burkina Faso	2	(0)

Managerial career
- 2007–2018: Université du Québec men
- 2008–2018: Université du Québec women
- * Club domestic league appearances and goals

Urbain Some (born 20 February 1979) is a Burkinabé former international football midfielder and head coach who played in the Burkinabé Premier League, Canadian Professional Soccer League, and the USL First Division. He is currently the president and co-founder of the Planet Soccer Academy.

== Playing career ==
Some began his professional career in his native Burkina Faso in the Burkinabé Premier League with Union Sportive des Forces Armées, with the club he won league titles in 1998, and 2000. In 2002, he went abroad to play with the Ottawa Wizards in the Canadian Professional Soccer League. In his debut season with Ottawa he assisted in securing the league treble (CPSL Championship, CPSL Canada Cup, and the Eastern Conference title). The following season he returned to the Wizards and helped the club to an undefeated season, but the club withdrew from the postseason after a dispute with the CPSL board of directors. In 2004, he played with Ottawa St. Anthony Italia in the Ottawa-Carleton Soccer League, and featured in the 2004 Open Canada Cup.

In 2005, he was signed by the Toronto Lynx of the USL First Division by his former Wizards head coach Hubert Busby, Jr., who signed him due to a shortage of players from injuries and suspensions. He made his debut for the club in the home opener against the Montreal Impact. He scored his first goal for the club on 31 May 2005 in a match against the Rochester Rhinos in 5–3 defeat. In 2006, he returned to Ottawa St. Anthony Italia, and was named the team captain. Throughout the season he contributed in securing the Ontario Cup, and the Canadian National Challenge Cup. He managed to win his second Open Canada Cup by defeating his former club the Toronto Lynx in a 2–0 victory over the professional club.

== International career ==
Some played for the Burkina Faso national team in 1998, where he made his international debut in a match against Guinea in a World Cup qualifier match.

== Managerial career ==
In 2007, he was named the head coach for the Université du Québec en Outaouais men's team, and in 2008 he served as the women's head coach for the university. He also formed the Planet Soccer Academy with Marc-Cyrille Kamdem in 2012.

== Honors ==
USFA Ouagadougou

- Burkinabé Premier League: 1998, 2000

Ottawa Wizards

- CPSL Championship: 2002
- CPSL Canada Cup: 2002
- CPSL Eastern Conference title: 2002, 2003

Ottawa St. Anthony Italia

- Canadian National Challenge Cup: 2006
- Ontario Cup: 2006
- Open Canada Cup: 2006
