= Robin Hart =

Trinidadian footballer (born 1978)

Personal information
- Date of birth: 7 April 1978 (age 48)
- Place of birth: Winnipeg, Manitoba, Canada
- Height: 1.72 m (5 ft 8 in)
- Position: Defender

Youth career
- Super Soccer Alliance
- Winnipeg Lucania FC

Senior career*
Years	Team	Apps	(Gls)
1999–2000	San Juan Jabloteh	15	(0)
2001–2003	Ottawa Wizards	56	(5)
2004	Edmonton Aviators	13	(0)
2005	Toronto Lynx	17	(0)
2006	Waterford Boosters Soccer	6	(0)

International career
1999	Trinidad and Tobago U23	2	(0)
- * Club domestic league appearances and goals as of 27 December 2009

Robin Hart (born 7 April 1978) is a Trinidadian former footballer who played in the TT Pro League, Canadian Professional Soccer League, and the USL First Division.

== Career ==
=== Youth career ===
Hart played for few teams in the Manitoba Major Soccer League which he played for the Super Soccer Alliance and Lucania FC.

=== Playing career ===
Hart began playing professional soccer in Trinidad and Tobago with San Juan Jabloteh. He was signed by expansion franchise Ottawa Wizards for the 2001 CPSL season. He made his Wizards debut on June 9, 2001 in a 4–0 victory over the Brampton Hitmen. He scored his first goal for the Wizards on September 9, 2001 in a 4–0 victory over Toronto Croatia. During the season he helped Ottawa achieve a 13 game undefeated streak and helped the Wizards finish first in the standings. Ottawa became the first franchise to oust Toronto Olympians from the top of the standings.

Another notable record achieved by the club was finishing the season with a record 51 points, the previous record before was 40 points which was held by Toronto. Hart also helped Ottawa capture the double, by winning the Open Canada Cup. During the 2002 CPSL season Hart helped the Wizards to 11 game undefeated streak and also helped his team win the treble by claiming the Eastern Conference title, the Rogers Cup, and for the second year in a row the Open Canada Cup. In the CPSL Championship final he scored the winning goal for Ottawa in 2–0 victory over North York Astros. In the 2003 CPSL season Hart helped the Wizards to an undefeated season and helped claim their third Eastern Conference title.

In 2004 it was announced that the CPSL revoked the Ottawa franchise, which led to Hart signing with the Edmonton Aviators of the A-League. In total he appeared in 13 matches for Edmonton and finished sixth in the Western Division failing to earn a playoff berth. The following year the Aviators ran into financial problems which forced the franchise to fold after one season. Enabling the Toronto Lynx to sign Hart to a contract on April 19, 2005. During the season the Lynx performed poorly which resulted in them finishing last in their conference, in total Hart appeared in 17 matches. The following season his contract was not renewed making him a free agent.

== International career ==
After the PanAm Games in Winnipeg 1999 he went on trial with the Trinidad & Tobago Under 23 team and earned a tryout in September 1999.

== Honors ==
=== Ottawa Wizards ===
- CPSL Championship (1): 2002
- Open Canada Cup (2): 2001, 2002
