= Josip Juric =

Croatian footballer

Personal information
- Date of birth: July 10, 1967 (age 59)
- Place of birth: SR Croatia, SFR Yugoslavia
- Position: Midfielder

Senior career*
Years	Team	Apps	(Gls)
1994–1996	Belišće	34	(7)
1999–2000	Vukovar '91	9	(0)
2002	Toronto Croatia		
- * Club domestic league appearances and goals

Josip Juric is a Croatian former footballer who played in the Croatian First Football League, and Canadian Professional Soccer League.

== Club career ==
Juric played with NK Belišće from 1994-1996 in the Croatian First Football League. He later played with HNK Vukovar '91, where he appeared in nine matches. In 2002, he went abroad to play in the Canadian Professional Soccer League with Toronto Croatia. In his debut season with Toronto he played in the Canada Cup final against Ottawa Wizards. Another achievement was clinching the Western Conference title, which secured a postseason berth for Croatia. He featured in the preliminary match against North York Astros, but were eliminated from the competition after a 1-0 loss.
