= Charles Gbeke =

Footballer (born 1978)

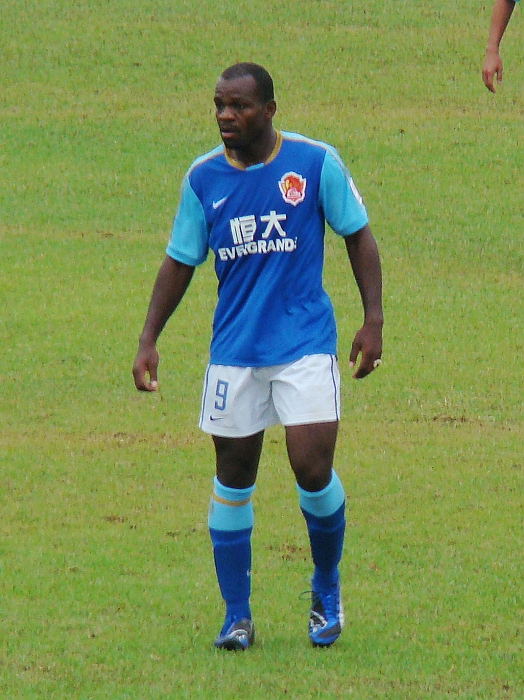
- Gbeke in 2010

Personal information
- Full name: Charles Patrick Gbeke
- Date of birth: March 15, 1978 (age 48)
- Place of birth: Abidjan, Ivory Coast
- Height: 6 ft 2 in (1.88 m)
- Position: Forward

Youth career
- 1998: Vancouver 86ers

Senior career*
Years	Team	Apps	(Gls)
1999–2000	Troyes B		
2000	Comercial		
2001	S. E. Matsubara		
2001	Vancouver Whitecaps	3	(0)
2002	Seattle Sounders	1	(0)
2003–2004	Ottawa Wizards	18	(10)
2004	→ Toronto Lynx (loan)	16	(6)
2004	→ Hamilton Thunder (loan)	5	(2)
2005	Herfølge	8	(0)
2005	Toronto Lynx	6	(2)
2005	Montreal Impact	9	(2)
2006	Rochester Raging Rhinos	22	(2)
2007–2008	Montreal Impact	40	(11)
2008	→ Trois-Rivieres Attak (loan)	2	(1)
2008–2009	Vancouver Whitecaps	42	(15)
2010	Guangzhou Evergrande	21	(9)

International career
2008–2009	Canada	3	(0)

Managerial career
- 2016: Cascavel
- * Club domestic league appearances and goals

Charles Gbeke (born March 15, 1978) is a former professional soccer player who played as a forward. Born in Ivory Coast, he made three appearances for the Canada national team.

Gbeke began his career with brief stints with Seattle Sounders and Vancouver Whitecaps, where he was deployed as a defender but failed to establish himself as a starter. It was in the Canadian Professional Soccer League during his stint with the Ottawa Wizards where he made the transition to a striker. His achievements at Ottawa included the Eastern Conference title, and an undefeated season.

He returned to the USL A-League on loan to the Toronto Lynx, where he proved to be a consistent striker capable of performing in the First Division. Following a brief stint in Europe, he was acquired by the Montreal Impact in a trade deadline move after tallying two goals in six games. Gbeke led the defending champions in scoring in the postseason, tallying all three goals, but the team was knocked out 4–3 on aggregate by the eventual champion Seattle Sounders. The following year he was transferred to league giants the Rochester Rhinos.

Gbeke found success again since his return to Montreal as he went on to record 10 goals that claimed him the Golden Boot award for the first time in his career. After a slow start with Montreal he was traded back to Vancouver only to win his first USL First Division Championship, where he scored both goals in the Whitecaps' 2–1 victory over Puerto Rico Islanders. In 2009 went on to claim the Golden Boot award for the second time in three years with 12 goals. In February 2010 he was ranked 18th in the USL First Division Top 25 of the Decade, a list of the best and most influential players of the previous decade.

In 2010, he went overseas to the China League One and secured Guangzhou Evergrande a promotion to the Chinese Super League and subsequently retired from competitive soccer at the conclusion of the season.

== Club career ==
=== Early years ===
Although Gbeke was born in Ivory Coast, he grew up in Montreal and is a citizen of Canada. From 1999 to 2001, Gbeke played in France for the Troyes AC reserves and in Brazil with clubs Comercial and S. E. Matsubara. During the 2001 season he played with Vancouver Whitecaps and with the Seattle Sounders. On May 2, 2003, he signed a contract with Ottawa Wizards of the CPSL. During the 2003 CPSL season he helped the team go undefeated allowing the club to clinch its third consecutive division title. Unfortunately the Wizards ran into problems with the CPSL administration which prevented the club in competing in the Open Canada Cup tournament and postseason. His personal achievement was finishing the season as the club's top goalscorer with 10 goals.

In 2004, with Ottawa facing revocation from the league, Gbeke was loan to the Toronto Lynx. He would make his debut for the club on June 13, 2004 against the Atlanta Silverbacks, the match marked the return of Gbeke to the A-League. Coincidentally he would record his first goal for the Lynx against his former club the Vancouver Whitecaps. Though his tenure with the Toronto club was rather short, nonetheless he proved to be an effective striker forming a solid partnership with Ali Gerba. He would conclude his season with the Lynx as their second highest goal scorer with six goals.

He finished off the season with the Hamilton Thunder, where he scored his first goal in his debut match against London City. He helped Hamilton clinch a playoff spot by clinching the Western Conference title. In 2005, Gbeke had a short stint in Europe where he played in Denmark with Herfølge, but following the team's relegation to the second division he was released from his contract. Following his release he secured a trial with Croatian side Dinamo Zagreb, but he returned to the Lynx for a second stint. His return to Toronto was not as successful as his previous term with the club suffering from a mediocre performances he was transferred.

=== Montreal Impact and Rochester ===
On August 1, 2005, Gbeke was acquired by the Montreal Impact along with David Diplacido before the trade deadline. With the Impact he scored the insurance goal and had an assist on the winner, in a 2–0 win against the Atlanta Silverbacks at home on August 7, in his first game with the Impact. During the playoffs, he scored all three goals in the semifinals against the Seattle Sounders. The following season Gbeke departed from Montreal in order to sign a new deal with the Rochester Rhinos for the 2006 season. Unfortunately he experienced a rather disappointing season with Rochester, where he only managed to score two goals in a total of 22 league matches. Though he did manage to lead the Rhinos to the USL First Division Championship finals, only to be defeated by his former club the Whitecaps.

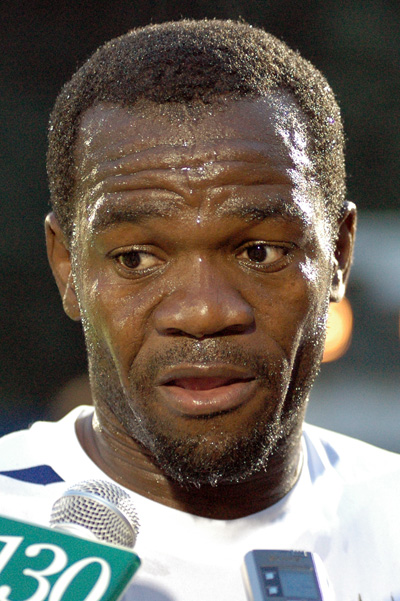
Headshot of Charles Gbeke in 2008

In 2007 Gbeke resigned with the Impact, where he was the top scorer in the United Soccer Leagues First Division, with 10 goals tied with Seattle Sounders forward Sébastien Le Toux. He was named to the All-League second team for the first time in his career, and was proclaimed Player of the Week for week 19 and was named five times to the USL D1 Team of the Week. During the team's annual awards banquet he was awarded the Impact's Offensive Player of the Year award. In 2008, he was loaned to the Impact's farm team the Trois-Rivières Attak of the Canadian Soccer League where he made his debut on June 27, 2008 in a 4–0 victory over TFC Academy. He recorded his first goal for Attak the next day on June 28 against TFC Academy in a 3–0 victory.

=== Back at Vancouver Whitecaps ===
On June 30, 2008, Gbeke was traded back to Vancouver in return for cash and Tony Donatelli going to Montreal. Gbeke scored both goals Vancouver's 2–1 win in the USL First Division final against Puerto Rico. The victory gave the Whitecaps their second USL Championship and also marked Gbeke's first USL Championship. Gbeke won the 2008–2009 USL First Division Golden Boot award scoring 12 goals. He also managed to lead the Whitecaps back to the Championship finals for the second consecutive year. Their opponents would end up being the Montreal Impact, this marking the first time in USL history where the final match would consist of two Canadian clubs. Unfortunately for Gbeke and his entire team they were defeated by Impact losing the series 6–3 on goals for aggregate. He was released by the Whitecaps at the end of the 2009 season in order to pursue other footballing options.

=== Move to China ===
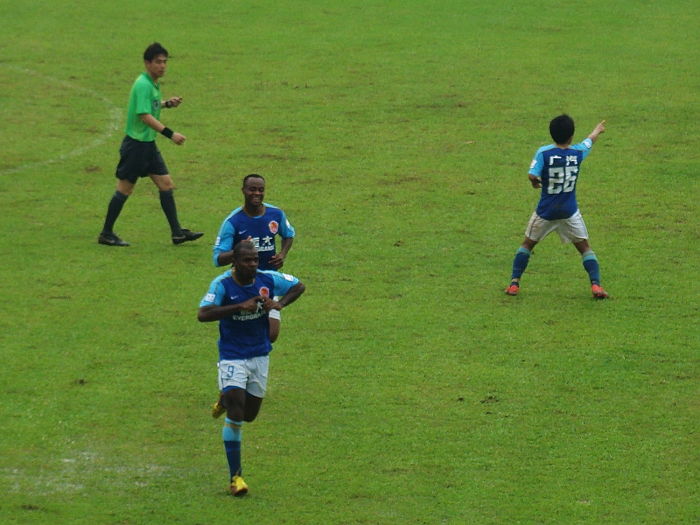
Charles Gbeke celebrated his goal with Gabriel Melkam in a Guangdong derby match on May 29, 2010

In February 2010, Gbeke moved to China with his former teammate Lyle Martin and signed a contract with Guangzhou F.C., which was newly relegated to China League One in the fallout of a match fixing scandal.

Gbeke made his China League One debut for Guangzhou against Beijing BIT on April 3 and earned a penalty kick in 23rd minute, which helped China national team striker Gao Lin score his first goal for Guangzhou. He scored his first goal for the club on his second appearance, in a 3–3 away draw against Pudong Zobon on April 10. In season 2010, Gbeke scored 9 goals in 21 appearances as Guangzhou finished first place in the League One and won promotion back to the top flight at the first attempt.

== International career ==
On February 1, 2008 Gbeke made his debut for Canada against Martinique in 1–0 victory. In total, he earned a total of three caps, all played in 2008, scoring no goals. He represented Canada in two FIFA World Cup qualification matches. He was also on the 2009 CONCACAF Gold Cup roster but did not play.

== Managerial career ==
In 2015, he was appointed the head coach for Futebol Clube Cascavel in the Campeonato Paranaense, and was dismissed from his post in 2016.

== Personal life ==
Charles Gbeke is teacher of a soccer school (BK Football Academy) in Laranjeiras do Sul – Paraná – Brazil.

== Honors ==
Ottawa Wizards

- Canadian Professional Soccer League Eastern Conference: 2003

Vancouver Whitecaps

- USL First Division: 2008

Guangzhou Evergrande

- China League One: 2010

Individual

- USL First Division top scorer: 2007, 2009
