= Shaq Moore =

American soccer player (born 1996)

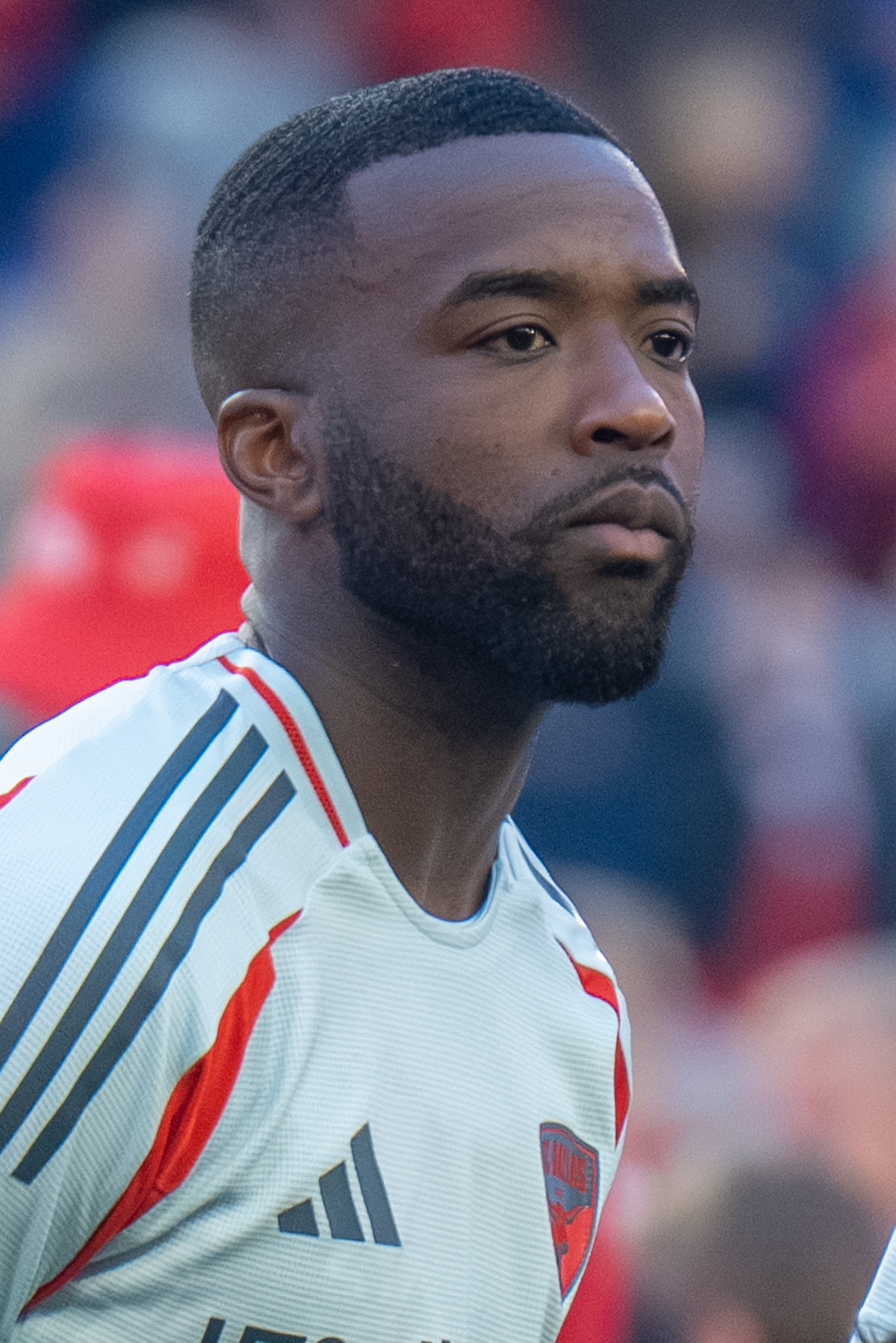
- Moore with FC Dallas in 2026

Personal information
- Full name: Shaquell Kwame Moore
- Date of birth: November 2, 1996 (age 30)
- Place of birth: Powder Springs, Georgia, United States
- Height: 5 ft 11 in (1.80 m)
- Position: Right-back

Team information
- Current team: FC Dallas
- Number: 18

Youth career
- IMG Academy
- 2014: FC Dallas
- 2014–2015: Huracán

Senior career*
| Years | Team | Apps | (Gls) |
| 2015–2016 | Huracán | 6 | (0) |
| 2016 | Oviedo B | 18 | (2) |
| 2016–2019 | Levante B | 61 | (4) |
| 2017–2019 | Levante | 6 | (0) |
| 2018 | → Reus (loan) | 9 | (0) |
| 2019–2022 | Tenerife | 90 | (1) |
| 2022–2024 | Nashville SC | 66 | (1) |
| 2025– | FC Dallas | 65 | (4) |

International career
| 2011–2013 | United States U17 | 40 | (2) |
| 2013 | United States U18 | 1 | (0) |
| 2014–2015 | United States U20 | 17 | (0) |
| 2018–2025 | United States | 21 | (1) |
Medal record
Representing United States
| Winner | CONCACAF Gold Cup | 2021 |
- * Club domestic league appearances and goals as of November 7, 2026

Shaquell Kwame "Shaq" Moore (born November 2, 1996) is an American professional soccer player who plays as a right-back for Major League Soccer club FC Dallas.

He spent his early professional career in Spain, playing six La Liga games for Levante and 99 in Segunda División for Reus and Tenerife. In 2022, he signed for Major League Soccer club Nashville SC for a fee of $2 million. In 2025, he was traded to fellow MLS side FC Dallas.

Moore made his debut for the United States national team in 2018 and was part of their team that won the 2021 CONCACAF Gold Cup, and also featured in their squad for the 2022 FIFA World Cup.

== Club career ==
=== Early career ===
Moore was born in Powder Springs, Georgia, and was an IMG Academy alumnus during his youth. In April 2014, he started training with Major League Soccer team FC Dallas.

In August 2014, Moore moved to Spain and went on to train with three teams in the city of Valencia: Valencia CF, Levante UD, and Huracán Valencia CF, being assigned to the latter's Juvenil A squad, as the club waited for an international transfer certificate. On May 9, 2015, he finally signed a contract with Huracán.

Moore made his senior debut for the club on August 22, 2015, coming on as a second-half substitute for Javi Soria in a 1–1 Segunda División B home draw against CD Atlético Baleares. The following January 7, after being rarely used, he signed with Real Oviedo Vetusta.

=== Levante ===
On August 30, 2016, Moore moved to another reserve team, Atlético Levante UD in the third division.

The following year, he was included in a first-team matchday for the first time on September 30, 2017, for a La Liga match against Deportivo Alavés. Moore made his main squad debut on October 26, 2017, starting in a 2–0 away win against Girona FC for the season's Copa del Rey. Three days later he made his La Liga debut, replacing Ivi in a 2–2 draw at SD Eibar. Following success in the previous two fixtures, Moore started his first game for Levante on November 18, 2017, in a 2–0 away defeat of UD Las Palmas. He became only the fourth American to play in La Liga after Kasey Keller, Jozy Altidore, and Oguchi Onyewu. He finished the campaign with eight first-team appearances.

On July 13, 2018, Moore agreed to a season-long loan deal with Segunda División side CF Reus Deportiu, but on December 28, he was one of five players who left the team due to unpaid wages.

=== Tenerife ===
On July 24, 2019, Moore signed a three-year contract with CD Tenerife also in the second division. The following May, his deal was extended until 2024.

Moore played 101 total games for the team from the Canary Islands, scoring once to open a 4–2 win at Extremadura UD on February 8, 2020. In his final match on June 19, 2022, the club lost 3–1 at home to Girona FC in the playoff final.

=== Nashville SC ===
On July 19, 2022, Moore signed with Major League Soccer side Nashville SC for a reported fee of US$2 million. He made his debut 11 days later in a 1–1 home draw with Vancouver Whitecaps FC, playing for 63 minutes.

=== FC Dallas ===
On December 27, 2024, Moore was traded to FC Dallas in exchange for up to $150,000 in General Allocation Money.

== International career ==
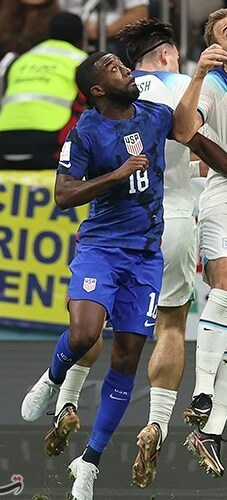
Moore playing for the United States at the 2022 FIFA World Cup

After rejecting Trinidad and Tobago at the under-15 level, Moore represented the United States at the under-17, under-18, and under-20 levels. He captained the under-17s in 2012–13, including at the 2013 CONCACAF U-17 Championship, and appeared with the under-20s at the 2015 FIFA U-20 World Cup.

Moore received his first senior team call-up to the United States national team for a friendly against Paraguay on March 18, 2018. He made his full international debut on June 2, as a 70th-minute substitute for DeAndre Yedlin in a 1–2 friendly loss away to the Republic of Ireland.

Uncapped since November 2018, Moore was called up by coach Gregg Berhalter for the 2021 CONCACAF Gold Cup. On July 18 in the final group game against Canada, he scored his first international goal and the only one of the American win; it came after 20 seconds, breaking Clint Dempsey's all-time record for the team's fastest goal by 14 seconds. He played all of his team's games as they won the title, though his appearance in the final against Mexico was off the bench as Reggie Cannon had recovered from injury.

On November 9, 2022, Moore was named in the final 26-man United States squad for the 2022 FIFA World Cup.

== Personal life ==
Moore is the son of former Trinidad and Tobago soccer player Wendell Moore. His older brother CJ played soccer for the Gardner–Webb Runnin' Bulldogs in 2012. Through his mother, he is the nephew of Richard Goddard, who played as a goalkeeper for the Caribbean nation.

== Career statistics ==
=== International ===
Appearances and goals by national team and year
| National team | Year | Apps | Goals |
|---|---|---|---|
| United States | 2018 | 5 | 0 |
| United States | 2019 | 0 | 0 |
| United States | 2020 | 0 | 0 |
| United States | 2021 | 8 | 1 |
| United States | 2022 | 4 | 0 |
| United States | 2023 | 0 | 0 |
| United States | 2024 | 2 | 0 |
| United States | 2025 | 2 | 0 |
| Total | | 21 | 1 |

Scores and results list Moore's goal tally first.

List of international goals scored by Shaq Moore
| No. | Date | Venue | Opponent | Score | Result | Competition |
|---|---|---|---|---|---|---|
| 1. | July 18, 2021 | Children's Mercy Park, Kansas City, United States | Canada | 1–0 | 1–0 | 2021 CONCACAF Gold Cup |

== Honors ==
United States

- CONCACAF Gold Cup: 2021

Individual

- CONCACAF Gold Cup Best XI: 2021
