= Sanjeev Parmar =

Canadian soccer player

Personal information
- Date of birth: 28 May 1978 (age 48)
- Place of birth: Campbell River, British Columbia
- Position: Midfielder

Senior career*
Years	Team	Apps	(Gls)
2000	Charlotte Eagles	6	(0)
2001–2002	Ottawa Wizards	26	(2)
- * Club domestic league appearances and goals as of 06 March 2015

Sanjeev Parmar (born May 28, 1978) is a Canadian former soccer player who played in the USISL D-3 Pro League, and Canadian Professional Soccer League who currently is head coach and founder of Ottawa club St. Anthony SC's Futuro Soccer Academy programme.

== Playing career ==
Parmar began playing soccer at the college level with Houghton College for four years where he was a three time All-American. In 2000, he was drafted by the Toronto Lynx of the USL A-League, but signed a contract with the Charlotte Eagles of the USISL D-3 Pro League. He featured in six matches for Charlotte, and managed to win the league title. Parmar traveled to Rwanda, Ethiopia, and Kenya on a pre-season tour to Africa, where he remained an additional three months in Ethiopia on a Christian mission.

Parmar returned to Canada in 2001 to sign with expansion franchise Ottawa Wizards of the Canadian Professional Soccer League. He scored his first goal on June 16, 2001 in an Open Canada Cup match against the Durham Flames in a 2–2 draw. He made the CPSL Al-Star roster which faced C.S. Marítimo in a friendly match. In his first season with Ottawa he managed to win the double by finishing first in the league standings and claiming the Open Canada Cup. The following season Parmar suffered a concussion causing him to miss the majority of the season, but he returned for the remainder of the season to win the treble with Ottawa. During his injury he managed to acquire a coaching A-license the youngest Canadian player to obtain a high level coaching license.

In 2012 Parmar founded Parmar Futuro, a soccer team based in Ottawa.

== Honors ==
=== Charlotte Eagles ===
- USISL D-3 Pro League Champions (1): 2000

=== Ottawa Wizards ===
- CPSL Championship (1): 2002
- Open Canada Cup (2): 2001, 2002
- Canadian Professional Soccer League Eastern Conference Champions (2): 2001, 2002
