= Wendell Moore (footballer) =

Trinidadian footballer (born 1964)

Personal information
- Full name: Wendell Ian Moore
- Date of birth: 18 September 1964 (age 62)
- Place of birth: Bethel, Tobago, Trinidad and Tobago
- Height: 5 ft 11 in (1.80 m)
- Position: Defender

Youth career
- 1981–1985: Signal Hill SCS

College career
Years	Team	Apps	(Gls)
1986–1987	Fairleigh Dickinson Knights		

Senior career*
Years	Team	Apps	(Gls)
1988–1999	Lauderhill Lions SC		
2000–2001	CS Villains		

International career
1984–1985	Trinidad and Tobago	3	(0)

Managerial career
- 2003–2004: St Clair Coaching School
- 2004–2005: Lauderhill Lions Optimists
- * Club domestic league appearances and goals

Wendell Moore (born 18 September 1964) is a former Trinidad and Tobago footballer and coach.

== Career ==
Moore was born in Bethel, Tobago. He played in his early career for the Signal Hill Senior Comprehensive School and on the Fairleigh Dickinson University for the Teneck Men Soccer team. He played after his graduating on the FDU in the year 1987, over ten years with Florida based Lauderhill Lions Soccer Club. Moore played by the club besides with the later MLS player Mark Chung and Miami Fusion Caribbean international player Reginald Pierre-Jerome. Moore played until 1998 with Lauderhill Lions, before signed with Coral Springs Men's Soccer League side CS Villains.

== International career ==
Moore earned three caps with the Trinidad and Tobago national football team. He played his international debut in a 1986 FIFA World Cup Qualification game against the Costa Rica national football team in Estadio Ricardo Saprissa Aymá in San José, Costa Rica on 24 April 1985.

== Coaching career ==
After his retirement he worked as teacher of the St Clair Coaching School in Carnbee Village, Tobago and later coached the under-14 boys team, Lauderhill Lions Optimists team of the South Florida United soccer association.

== Personal life ==
Both his sons Shaquell and CJ play in the US national youth soccer system. Shaquell also plays for Nashville SC in MLS. Moore is married with Michelle Goddard, a sister of fellow footballer and former national team member of Wendell, Richard Goddard.
