= Sa Brahima Traore =

Burkinabe footballer (born 1982)

Sa Brahima Traoré
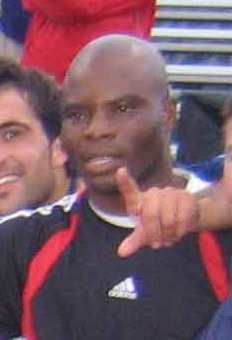
- Sa Brahima Traore in 2005

Personal information
- Date of birth: 13 March 1982 (age 44)
- Place of birth: Bobo-Dioulasso, Republic of Upper Volta
- Height: 1.78 m (5 ft 10 in)
- Position: Goalkeeper

Senior career*
Years	Team	Apps	(Gls)
1998–1999	Étoile Filante de Ouagadougou		
2000–2001	RC Bobo		
2002–2003	Ottawa Wizards	29	(0)
2005–2006	Oakville Blue Devils	40	(0)

International career
2001	Burkina Faso	1	(0)
- * Club domestic league appearances and goals

Sa Brahima Traore (born 13 March 1982) is a Burkinabé former international footballer who played the majority of his career in North America and Africa.

== Club career ==
Traore began his professional career in his native Burkina Faso in the Burkinabé Premier League with Étoile Filante de Ouagadougou. With Ouagadougou he managed to win the Coupe du Faso in 1999. In 2000, he was transferred to RC Bobo where he played for two seasons. The following year he went abroad to Canada to sign with the Ottawa Wizards of the Canadian Professional Soccer League. Throughout the 2002 season he assisted the club by clinching their division title, and winning the Open Canada Cup. In the post season he appeared in all the playoff matches and reached the finals where the club faced the North York Astros, where the Wizards ended up winning the playoff title in a 2–0 victory. He posted 14 clean sheets and allowed only 16 goals in 24 games - ranking Ottawa first with the fewest goals conceded.

In 2003, Traore saw limited action due to the acquisition of Simon Eaddy, as Ottawa went undefeated the entire season clinching their third consecutive division title. The achievement marked the second time in CPSL history that a team went undefeated in a season. He was released from his contract in 2004 as the CPSL revoked the Ottawa franchise from the league. In 2005, Traore signed with expansion franchise the Oakville Blue Devils. He assisted Oakville in finishing second in the Western Conference in the process clinching a playoff berth. In the postseason he played in all three matches leading the Blue Devils to the finals of the CPSL championship match. He featured in the finals match where Oakville faced the Vaughan Shooters winning the game to a score of 2–1. The victory marked a milestone in CPSL history making Oakville the first expansion team to win the CPSL championship in their debut season. Traore returned to the Greater Toronto Area club for the 2006 season. In 2006, he helped the Blue Devils claim their first division title by finishing first in the standings, but unfortunately their postseason came to an early conclusion in the quarterfinals losing out to the Windsor Stars.

== International career ==
Traore played for the Burkina Faso national team in 2001, where he made his international debut in a match against South Africa in a World cup qualifier match.

== Honors ==
Étoile Filante de Ouagadougou

- Coupe du Faso: 1999

Ottawa Wizards

- CPSL Championship: 2002
- Open Canada Cup: 2002
- Canadian Professional Soccer League Eastern Conference Champions: 2002, 2003

Oakville Blue Devils

- CPSL Championship: 2005
- National Division: 2006
