= Paulo Valdez =

Canadian soccer player

Personal information
- Place of birth: Canada
- Position: Midfielder

Senior career*
Years	Team	Apps	(Gls)
1998	Vancouver Whitecaps	1	(0)
2001–2002	Toronto Supra		
- * Club domestic league appearances and goals

Paulo Valdez is a Canadian former soccer player who played in the USL A-League, and Canadian Professional Soccer League.

== Career ==
Valdez played in the USL A-League in 1998 with the Vancouver Whitecaps. In 2001, he played with Toronto Supra in the Canadian Professional Soccer League, and featured in the CPSL Championship final against St. Catharines Roma. On September 6, 2017, he was selected for the Vancouver Whitecaps alumni team in a friendly match against Hollywood North.

After his retirement from professional soccer he became an academy coach for the Whitecaps Academy and North Shore Girls SC.
