= McDonald Yobe =

Malawian footballer

Personal information
- Date of birth: 11 September 1981 (age 45)
- Place of birth: Malawi
- Positions: Midfielder; striker

Senior career*
| Years | Team | Apps | (Gls) |
| 1997–2001 | Mighty Wanderers FC | | |
| 2001–2003 | Big Bullets FC | | |
| 2003–2004 | Ottawa Wizards | | |

International career
| | Malawi national team | 26 | (1) |
- * Club domestic league appearances and goals

McDonald Yobe (born 11 September 1981) is a retired Malawian footballer who played as a midfielder or striker.

== Career ==
Yobe was the first player to be transferred for 1 million kwacha when he moved from Telecom Wanderers to local rival Big Bullets. He played his last professional season for Ottawa Wizards in the Canadian Soccer League.

== International career ==
He also played for the Malawi national team.

== Personal ==
He has retired from active football, and is a resident in Manchester where he plays for a local social team of diaspora Malawians. Yobe is married with two children.
