= Peter Mponda =

Malawian footballer (born 1981)

Personal information
- Date of birth: 4 September 1981 (age 45)
- Place of birth: Machinga, Malawi
- Height: 1.81 m (5 ft 11 in)
- Position: Central defender

Senior career*
Years	Team	Apps	(Gls)
1998–2001	Bakili Bullets	98	(7)
2002–2003	Ottawa Wizards	32	(3)
2004	Bakili Bullets	33	(3)
2005	CAPS United	31	(5)
2005–2010	Black Leopards		
2010–2012	Engen Santos	20	(0)

International career
1998–2011	Malawi	102	(1)

Managerial career
- 2019: Malawi U-20
- 2023: Black Leopards
- 2024: Silver Strikers
- 2025: Nyasa Big Bullets
- * Club domestic league appearances and goals

Peter Mponda (born 4 September 1981) is a Malawian football manager and former player. He played as a central defender and was the captain of the Malawi national team.

In November 2019, he was appointed coach of the Malawi national under-20 football team.

== Managerial career ==
In the summer of 2023, he returned to his former Black Leopards club as an assistant coach under head coach Alejandra Dorado. After several poor results, the club elevated Mponda to the head coach on September 28, 2023. Mponda returned to his native Malawi in January 2024 as the new head coach for Silver Strikers. In his debut season in the nation's capital, he secured the league title for the club. Once the season concluded, he left Silver Strikers.

After he departed from the Silver Strikers, he was appointed head coach for Nyasa Big Bullets FC on 6 January 2025. Once the season concluded, he was dismissed from Nyasa. Following his dismissal from Nyasa, he consulted for a match for league rivals Dedza Dynamos.

== Career statistics ==
#	Date	Venue	Opponent	Score	Result	Competition
1.	8 June 2002	Silver Stadium, Lilongwe, Malawi	Botswana	2–0	Win	Friendly
Correct as of 13 January 2017

== See also ==
- List of men's footballers with 100 or more international caps
