= Jerzy Gębczyński =

Polish footballer

Personal information
- Full name: Jerzy Gębczyński
- Date of birth: 1 December 1962 (age 63)
- Place of birth: Duszniki-Zdrój, Polish People's Republic
- Position: Midfielder

Senior career*
Years	Team	Apps	(Gls)
1979–1985	Lechia Dzierżoniów		
1986–1987	Górnik Wałbrzych	1	(0)
1987–1988	Lechia Dzierżoniów		
1992–2000	London City		

Managerial career
- 2000–2001: London City
- * Club domestic league appearances and goals

Jerzy "Jurek" Gębczyński (born 1 December 1962) is a Polish former footballer who played in the III liga, Ekstraklasa, Canadian National Soccer League, and the Canadian Professional Soccer League.

== Playing career ==
Gębczyński began his career in 1979 with Lechia Dzierżoniów in the III liga. In 1986, he played in the Polish top tier league the Ekstraklasa with Gornik Wałbrzych. The following season, he returned to Lechia Dzierżoniów for a season. In 1992, he played abroad with London City in the National Soccer League. In 1999, he was selected for the CPSL All-Star roster against a Canada Development Team. In 2000, he was elevated as the head coach to London. Gębczyński was appointed the head coach for the CPSL All-Star team in 2002 against TSV Munich 1860.
