= Shurland David =

Trinidadian footballer (born 1974)

Personal information
- Full name: Shurland Roderick David
- Date of birth: 24 November 1974 (age 51)
- Place of birth: Trinidad and Tobago
- Position: Defender

Senior career*
Years	Team	Apps	(Gls)
1997–1998	Joe Public		
1999–2000	San Juan Jabloteh		
2001–2002	Ottawa Wizards		
2003–2004	Caledonia AIA		
2004–2005	Starworld Strikers		
2005	East/West Coaching School		

International career
1998–2001	Trinidad and Tobago	44	(0)

Managerial career
- 2010–2011: North East Stars F.C.
- 2017: WASA F.C.
- 2019: FC Santa Rosa
- 2024–: FC Maloney Eagles
- * Club domestic league appearances and goals

Shurland David (born 19 August 1974) is a retired football defender and manager from Trinidad and Tobago.

== Club career ==
David began his career in 1997 with Joe Public, and later played in the TT Pro League with San Juan Jabloteh. In 2001, he played abroad in the Canadian Professional Soccer League with Ottawa Wizards. Throughout his tenure with Ottawa he achieved a CPSL Championship, and a CPSL League Cup. In 2003, he returned to Trinidad to play with Caledonia AIA, and concluded his career with Starworld Strikers, and East/West Coaching School.

== International career ==
David made his debut for the national team on 4 January 1998 against the Barbados national team in a friendly match, and made 44 appearances for the national team. He played in the 1998 CONCACAF Gold Cup, 1998 Caribbean Cup, and 2000 CONCACAF Gold Cup.

== Managerial career ==
In 2010, David was elevated from an assistant coach to interim head coach for North East Stars F.C. in order to replace Rod Underwood. In 2011, he was dismissed from his post after a series of poor results. In 2017, he managed in the National Super League with WASA F.C.

He was named head coach for FC Santa Rosa for the 2019 season in the TT Super League. Despite his appointment, he left Santa Rosa before the season started. In 2024, he became the head coach for FC Maloney Eagles in the Eastern FA Premier Division. David led the Eagles to a championship victory in 2026.
