= Nikola Andrijevic =

Canadian former soccer player

Personal information
- Full name: Nikola Andrijevic
- Date of birth: January 18, 1969 (age 57)
- Place of birth: Banja Luka, Bosnia
- Height: 1.81 m (5 ft 11 in)
- Position: Forward

Senior career*
Years	Team	Apps	(Gls)
2000	Toronto Lynx	1	(0)
2001–2003	Toronto Croatia		
2003–2004	Hamilton Thunder		
- * Club domestic league appearances and goals

Nikola Andrijevic is a Canadian former soccer player who had stints in the USL A-League, and the Canadian Professional Soccer League.

== Playing career ==
Andrijevic was signed by the Toronto Lynx of the USL A-League in 2000. He would make his debut for the club on July 12, 2000, against Connecticut Wolves. He helped Toronto qualify for the postseason for the second time in the club's history, where Toronto would finish third in the Northeast Division. In the playoffs the Lynx faced Richmond Kickers in the first round, and advanced to the next round by a 3-1 goals on aggregate. In the next round Toronto would face the Rochester Rhinos, but would be eliminated from the playoffs by a score of 2–1 on goals on aggregate. In 2001, he signed with Toronto Croatia of the Canadian Professional Soccer League. He made his debut for the organization on June 3, 2001, in a match against North York Astros. In the 2002 season he assisted Toronto in clinching the Western Conference title and securing a postseason berth. He appeared in the semi-final match against North York Astros, but were eliminated from playoff contention by a score of 1–0.

In 2003, Andrijevic was traded to division rivals Hamilton Thunder, where he clinched the Western Conference title. He featured in the semi-final match against Vaughan Sun Devils, where Vaughan was defeated by a score of 2–0. The following season he repeated Hamilton's success by clinching their second division title.
