= Jimmy Kuzmanovski =

Canadian former soccer player

Personal information
- Place of birth: Oshawa, Ontario, Canada
- Height: 5 ft 11 in (1.80 m)
- Position: Forward

Senior career*
Years	Team	Apps	(Gls)
2000–2001	Oshawa Flames	34	(16)
2002–2003	Mississauga Olympians		
2002	→ Toronto Lynx (loan)	1	(0)
- * Club domestic league appearances and goals as of May 03 2015

Jimmy Kuzmanovski is a Canadian former soccer player who had stints in the USL A-League, and the Canadian Professional Soccer League.

== Playing career ==
Kuzmanovski began his professional in 2000 with the Oshawa Flames of the Canadian Professional Soccer League. In his debut season he finished as the club's top goalscorer, and was nominated and awarded the CPSL Rookie of the Year award. In 2002, he signed with the Mississauga Olympians, and he made his debut for the club on May 24, 2002 in a match against York Region Shooters. Midway through the season he was loaned out to the Toronto Lynx of the USL A-League. He made his debut for Toronto on June 9, 2002 against Charleston Battery, coming on as a substitute for former Olympian player Elvis Thomas. He later returned to Mississauga, and helped reach the postseason by finishing second in the Western Conference. He appeared in the Wild card match against North York Astros, but unfortunately were defeated by a score of 3-0.
