= Willy Giummarra =

Canadian soccer player

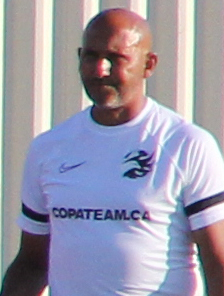
- Giummarra in 2022

Personal information
- Full name: William Giummarra
- Date of birth: 26 August 1971 (age 55)
- Place of birth: Scarborough, Ontario, Canada
- Positions: Midfielder; striker

Youth career
- 1994–1995: UAB Blazers

Senior career*
Years	Team	Apps	(Gls)
1996–1997	Philadelphia KiXX (indoor)	16	(10)
1996–1997	St. Louis Ambush (indoor)	11	(2)
1996–1997	Toronto Shooting Stars (indoor)	10	(12)
1996	Montreal Impact	6	(1)
1997–1998	Montreal Impact (indoor)	10	(4)
1997–1998	Harrisburg Heat (indoor)	44	(28)
1997–1998	Darlington F.C.	3	(0)
1998	Toronto Lynx	5	(0)
1998–1999	Florida ThunderCats (indoor)	12	(11)
1999–2000	York Region Shooters		
2000–2001	Toronto ThunderHawks (indoor)	31	(15)
2001	Toronto Olympians		
2002–2003	Vaughan Sun Devils		
2004	Toronto Croatia		
2004	Brampton Hitmen		

Managerial career
- 2008–2009: Markham Lightning
- 2022: Toronto Falcons
- * Club domestic league appearances and goals

Willy Giummarra (born August 26, 1971) is a Canadian former soccer player who played as a forward and midfielder. Most recently, he was the head coach of Canadian Soccer League side Toronto Falcons.

== Career ==
=== College career ===
Giummarra began playing at the college level in 1994 with the UAB Blazers where in his debut season was named the newcomer of the year and first-team selection. In his sophomore season, he assisted the team in securing the Conference USA title and, for the second consecutive season, was named to the first-team selection. Throughout his tenure with UAB, he finished as the top goal scorer in both seasons. In 1996, he was named to the Umbro Select team, which featured all-stars from across all colleges.

=== Montreal Impact ===
He began his transition to the professional level by being drafted in the 1996 USL A-League draft by the Montreal Impact. He would ultimately secure a permanent deal with the club and appear in 6 matches in his debut season.

=== Indoor career ===
In the winter of 1996, he played at the indoor level in the National Professional Soccer League by signing with the expansion franchise Toronto Shooting Stars. He would make his debut for the club on October 18, 1996, against St. Louis Ambush. He would further contribute by recording several goals against Buffalo Blizzard, which marked the club's first victory on October 27, 1996. His time in Toronto was short-lived as the organization experienced several financial issues, resulting in Giummarra not showing up for a match against Edmonton Drillers. He was ultimately traded to Philadelphia KiXX when a change occurred in the coaching staff.

For the remainder of the 1996-97 season, he was traded to St. Louis Ambush in exchange for a second-round draft choice. He helped St. Louis clinch a postseason berth by winning their division and reaching the conference finals. In total, he appeared in 11 matches and recorded 2 goals. After the conclusion of the season, he was released from his contract.

Following his brief stint abroad in England, he returned to his former club, Montreal Impact, where he played with the club's indoor team for the initial portion of the 1997-98 indoor season. His second stint with Montreal was rather short as he was waived by the team on January 16, 1998. His release stemmed from the team being reorganized by head coach Johan Arnio.

For the remainder of the indoor season, he signed with Harrisburg Heat as a free agent. He assisted in securing a postseason berth for the club. He signed a multi-year deal with Harrisburg on October 13, 1998. Though he extended his contract with Harrisburg, he was still traded to league rivals Florida ThunderCats in exchange for Marcello Fontana, Leonel Pernia, and cash consideration on February 26, 1999.

He played his final indoor season with expansion side Toronto ThunderHawks for the 2000-01 indoor season. Throughout the season, he appeared in 31 matches and recorded 15 goals for Toronto.

=== England ===
Once the indoor season concluded in late 1997, he played abroad in the English third division with Darlington F.C. He would make his debut for the club on September 2, 1997, against Scarborough F.C. In total, he would appear in three matches for Darlington.

=== Toronto Lynx ===
He returned to the A-League in 1998 to sign with his hometown club, the Toronto Lynx. He made his debut on June 7, 1998, against Long Island Rough Riders. In his single season with Toronto, he appeared in 5 matches.

=== CPSL ===
In 1999, he played in the Southern Ontario-based Canadian Professional Soccer League with York Region Shooters. In his debut season with the Vaughan-based club, he was selected to the CPSL All-Star roster against the National Training Centre squad. He re-signed with York Region for the 2000 season, where he was awarded the league's MVP award. After two seasons with York Region, he was traded to Toronto Olympians for the 2001 season. During his tenure with the Olympians, he was selected twice to the all-star team, which faced the Morocco U-23 and Portuguese side C.S. Marítimo.

In 2002, he signed with league rivals Vaughan Sun Devils. He re-signed with Vaughan for the 2003 season, when the club reached the CPSL Championship final. Following his two-year tenure with Vaughan, he moved on to play with Toronto Croatia in 2004. His stint with Croatia was short-lived as he played the remainder of the season with the Brampton Hitmen.

=== Amateur level ===
In 2008, he won the Masters Eastern National Club Championship with Markham Lightning men's over-35 soccer team. He helped Markham successfully defend their title the following season.

== Managerial career ==
In 2022, he was named the head coach for the Toronto Falcons in the Canadian Soccer League.

== Honors ==
=== Player ===
St. Louis Ambush

- National Professional Soccer League Midwest Division: 1996–97

Vaughan Shooters

- CPSL Championship runner-up: 2003

Individual

- Canadian Professional Soccer League MVP: 2000
