= Kevin Nelson (soccer) =

Trinidad and Tobago footballer

Personal information
- Full name: Kevin Nelson
- Date of birth: February 23, 1979 (age 47)
- Place of birth: Trinidad and Tobago
- Height: 5 ft 11 in (1.80 m)
- Position: Forward

Senior career*
Years	Team	Apps	(Gls)
1999	San Juan Jabloteh		
2000	Caracas FC	11	(3)
2001–2003	Ottawa Wizards	60	(50)
2004	Hamilton Thunder	18	(9)
2005–2006	South Melbourne FC		
2006	San Juan Jabloteh		
- * Club domestic league appearances and goals

Kevin Nelson (born February 23, 1979) is a Trinidad and Tobagonian former footballer who owned and operated the accredited Kevin Nelson Soccer Academy in Ontario, Canada and is currently Technical Director at Specialization Training www.spectraining.ca, also Head Coach at West Ottawa Soccer Club. He played in the TT Pro League, Venezuelan Primera División, Canadian Professional Soccer League, and the National Premier Leagues Victoria with South Melbourne FC.

== Playing career ==
Nelson started his career playing at the youth level with St. Clair Football School in Trinidad and Tobago. He signed his first professional contract with San Juan Jabloteh where his consistent goal-scoring abilities led him to be signed by Caracas FC in Venezuela. Nelson was signed by new expansion franchise Ottawa Wizards for the 2001 CPSL season. He made his Wizards debut on June 9, 2001, in a 4–0 victory over the Brampton Hitmen and scored his first goal for the franchise. He soon had an instant impact, forming a strong attacking partnership with Abraham Osman. Nelson finished the season as the Wizards' and CPSL leading scorer with 22 goals combined in all competitions. On October 14 at the CPSL Awards Banquet he was awarded the CPSL Rookie of the Year Award, and the CPSL Golden Boot.

During the 2002 CPSL season for the second year in a row he led his team in goals, scoring 18 goals in all competitions. Nelson also helped the Wizards win the Treble by winning the Eastern Conference title, the Rogers Cup, and the Open Canada Cup. In the Open Canada Cup final Nelson scored the winning goal in 1–0 victory over Toronto Croatia. In the 2003 CPSL season Nelson helped the Wizards to an undefeated season and helped claim their second Eastern Conference title.

In 2004 it was announced that the CPSL had revoked the Ottawa franchise, which led to Nelson's signing with the Hamilton Thunder. He made his debut for them on May 27, 2004, in a match against Metro Lions. During his tenure with Hamilton he finished second in scoring with nine goals, and helped the franchise win their first Western Conference title. In 2005, Nelson went abroad and played with South Melbourne FC in Australia; after he received an injury South Melbourne released him from his contract. After his release he had a stint with San Juan before retiring and resettling back in Ottawa to start his own soccer academy ( Kevin Nelson Soccer Academy) .
