= Phil Ionadi =

Canadian businessman, soccer executive and player

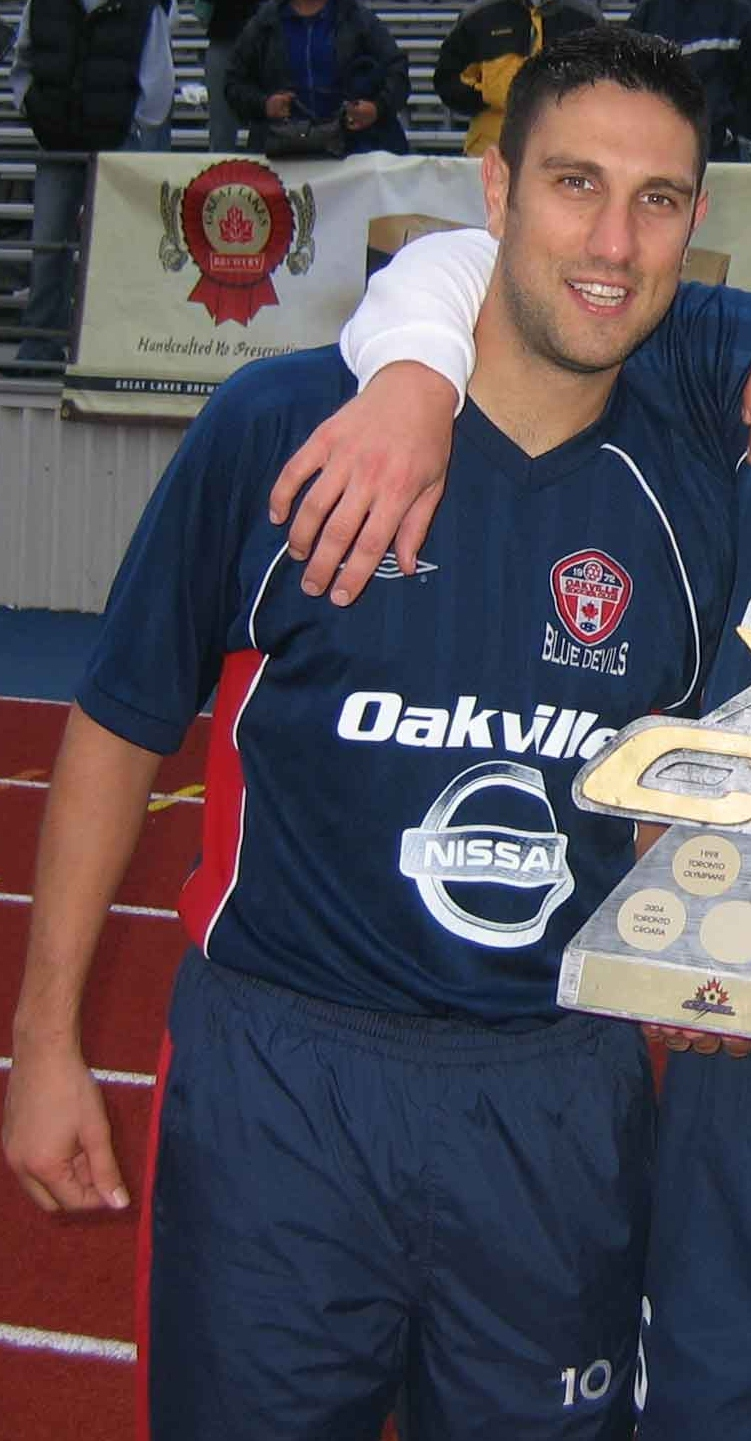
- Ionadi in 2005

Personal information
- Full name: Philip Ionadi
- Height: 5 ft 11 in (1.80 m)
- Position: Midfielder

College career
Years	Team	Apps	(Gls)
1995–1998	Belhaven Blazers		

Senior career*
Years	Team	Apps	(Gls)
1996	Toronto Italia		
1997	Toronto Supra	6	(0)
1998	Toronto Lynx	5	(0)
1998	Glen Shields Sun Devils	11	(2)
1999	Montreal Impact (indoor)	30	(5)
2000	Montreal Impact	5	(0)
2000–2001	Toronto ThunderHawks (indoor)	32	(3)
2002–2004	Brampton Hitmen	72	(22)
2005	Oakville Blue Devils	17	(4)

International career
2005	Canada Beach	3	(1)

Managerial career
- 2006: Oakville Blue Devils
- 2018–2019: Mississauga MetroStars
- * Club domestic league appearances and goals as of December 23, 2014

Phil Ionadi is a Canadian businessman, soccer executive, former soccer player, head coach, and the general manager for the Canadian Arena Soccer Association.

He initially began playing college soccer abroad with Belhaven University. After a series of stints in the Canadian National Soccer League he eventually played in the USL A-League in 1998 with the Toronto Lynx, and later with the Montreal Impact. Shortly after he played in the Canadian Professional Soccer League, and began playing indoor soccer in 1999 in the National Professional Soccer League with the Montreal Impact. After his release from Montreal he played with several clubs in the National Professional Soccer League, and in 2002 returned to the CPSL with the Brampton Hitmen.

Ionadi would conclude his playing career in the CPSL, where he won two CPSL Championships, was named CPSL MVP, and a four time CPSL All-Star. He also represented Canada at the international level in beach soccer, where he played in the 2005 CONCACAF and CONMEBOL Beach Soccer Championship. After retiring he transitioned into coaching, and was appointed head coach for the Oakville Blue Devils in 2006. In 2018, he returned to coaching as the head coach for the Mississauga MetroStars.

He also contributed in the administrative field of soccer initially beginning in the Canadian Soccer League (CSL) in 2008 as a director of business operations for the Brampton Lions. He eventually sat on the CSL Board of Directors as the Director for Youth, and was instrumental in forming the Canadian Academy of Futbol (CAF) in 2012. In 2017, the Canadian Arena Soccer Association appointed Ionadi as the general manager for the Canada national arena soccer team.

== Playing career ==
Ionadi began playing at the college level in 1995 with Belhaven University, where he earned NAIA GCAC All-Conference Men's Soccer honors. During the college off season he played in the USISL Premier League with the Jackson Chargers. Before pursuing college soccer he received the opportunity to experience professional soccer in the Canadian Soccer League with the North York Rockets. In 1996, he played with Toronto Italia in the Canadian National Soccer League, where he assisted in securing a treble for the club. The following season he played with league rivals Toronto Supra.

In 1998, the United Soccer League granted Toronto a franchise he featured for the Toronto Lynx in the USL A-League. After appearing in five matches he played the remainder of the season with Glen Shields Sun Devils in the Canadian Professional Soccer League, and was selected for the CPSL All-Stars match. In 1999, he signed with the Montreal Impact, and played an indoor season in the National Professional Soccer League. Throughout his time in the National Professional Soccer League he played with Montreal Impact, and Toronto ThunderHawks. He also participated in the 2000 outdoor season in the A-League, but was released later on.

In 2001, Ionadi returned to the Canadian Professional Soccer League, and signed with expansion franchise the Brampton Hitmen, where he served as the team captain. His most notable achievement with the organization was in the 2003 season where he finished as the club's top goalscorer with 13 goals, and secured the teams first CPSL Championship. As a result of his efforts he was recognized with the CSL MVP award. On May 19, 2005 he signed a contract with expansion franchise Oakville Blue Devils, and was named team captain. In his debut and final season with Oakville he assisted in claiming his second championship title, and establishing a league milestone as Oakville became the first expansion franchise to win the championship title in their debut season.

== International career ==
Ionadi played with the Canada national beach soccer team, and made his debut on March 3, 2005 against Mexico in the 2005 CONCACAF and CONMEBOL Beach Soccer Championship.

== Coaching career ==
In 2006, Ionadi made the transition to coaching by being appointed head coach for the Oakville Blue Devils in the Canadian Soccer League. In his debut season he won the National Division title, and produced the best offensive and defensive records in the division. In the postseason Oakville was defeated in the opening round to the Windsor Border Stars. He also served as the youth coach for Oakville Soccer Club in 2006.

In 2018, he was named head coach and general manager for the Mississauga Metrostars in the Major Arena Soccer League. After a series of poor performances Ionadi was relieved from his position on March 1, 2019.

== Administrative career ==
In 2006, along with coaching Ionadi was hired as the academy director for Oakville Soccer Club, where he served from 2007 till 2010. On April 10, 2008, he was selected as the Director of Business Operations for the Brampton Lions in the Canadian Soccer League (CSL). In 2012, he purchased LIKA Sports Inc, and currently serves as the company's chief executive officer. In 2013, he served on the CSL Board of Directors as the Director for Youth, and was awarded the Harry Paul Gauss Memorial Award. In 2012, he was one of founders and served as the president of the Canadian Academy of Futbol (CAF) a soccer development program which consists of different soccer clubs and academies organizing soccer competitions, seasons, tournaments, camps, and showcases.

In 2017, he was named the general manager for the Canadian Arena Soccer Association. Ionadi ventured into sports management field in 2021 where he became the president for Primetime Sports Marketing Inc.

== Managerial stats ==
Team	Nat	From	To	Record				
Team	Nat	From	To	G	W	L	D	Win %
Oakville Blue Devils	(Canada)	28 May 2006	30 October 2006	22	10	6	6	45.45

== Honours ==
=== Player ===
Brampton Hitmen

- CPSL Championship: 1

2003

Oakville Blue Devils

- CPSL Championship: 1

2005

=== Individual ===
- Canadian Soccer League MVP Award: 2003

=== Managerial ===
Oakville Blue Devils

- Canadian Soccer League National Division: 1

2006
