= Tom Kouzmanis =

Canadian former soccer player (born 1973)

Personal information
- Date of birth: 22 April 1973 (age 53)
- Place of birth: East York, Ontario, Canada
- Height: 1.72 m (5 ft 8 in)
- Positions: Midfielder; striker

College career
Years	Team	Apps	(Gls)
1993–1995	Toronto Varsity Blues		
2001–2004	Toronto Varsity Blues		

Senior career*
Years	Team	Apps	(Gls)
1991	Nova Scotia Clippers	7	(1)
1992	Montreal Supra	11	(4)
1995–1996	Montreal Impact	21	(2)
1997	Toronto Lynx	16	(3)
2000–2001	Toronto Olympians		
2002	Vaughan Sun Devils		
2002–2003	GS United		

International career
1988–1989	Canada U17	7	(0)
1990	Canada U20	2	(1)
1991	Canada U23	6	(0)
1995–1997	Canada	5	(4)
- * Club domestic league appearances and goals

Thomas Kouzmanis (born 22 April 1973) is a Canadian former soccer player who played at both professional and international levels.

Kouzmanis played as both a midfielder and a striker.

== Club career ==
Born in East York, Ontario, Kouzmanis spent the 1991 season playing in the CSL with the Nova Scotia Clippers, and then Montreal Supra the next year. and after playing college soccer with the Varsity Blues, returned to the professional game, spending time with the Montreal Impact, the Toronto Lynx, and the Vaughan Sun Devils.

In 2003, Kouzmanis returned to college soccer with the Varsity Blues, who permitted him to play a sixth year of college soccer in violation of regulations limiting players to five.

== International career ==
Kouzmanis represented Canada at under-17, under-20, under-23 and full international levels.

Kouzmanis participated at the 1989 FIFA U-17 World Championship, the 1995 Caribana Cup, and the 1996 CONCACAF Gold Cup.

== Personal life ==
His brother Gus was also a soccer player.
