= Durham Flames =

Former Canadian association football team

- Full name: Durham Flames
- Nickname: The Flames
- Founded: 1999 (as Oshawa Flames)
- Stadium: Oshawa Civic Stadium; Thornton Rd South / Gibb Street; Oshawa; Canada
- Capacity: 2,000
- League: Defunct club Former members of Canadian Professional Soccer League
Home colours

Durham Flames were a semi-professional Canadian football club based in Oshawa, Ontario, Canada. The club competed in the Canadian Professional Soccer League for five seasons from 1999 to 2003.

== Background ==
Durham Flames (previously known as Oshawa Flames) played in the Canadian Professional Soccer League which is the third tier of Canadian football pyramid. The club was founded in 1999 and played their home matches at the Oshawa Civic Stadium in Oshawa. The stadium is able to accommodate 2,000 spectators. The club was affiliated to the Canadian Soccer Association.

== History ==
Durham Flames were originally known as Oshawa Flames and first entered the Canadian Professional Soccer League in 1999, as a replacement for the Mississauga Eagles. The club's first head coach was CSL and APSL veteran Jens Kraemer. Notable acquisition were Darryl Gomez, Pat Sullivan, and Hubert Busby, Jr. The club finished in fifth position and reached the semi-finals of the League Cup before going out 2–0 on aggregate to Toronto Croatia, the second match proving decisive at Centennial Park Stadium. The following season the team hired the services of Durham College head coach Stan Bombino to coach the team. Bombino led Durham to a seventh-place finish which reflected the fact that they drew 9 of their 14 matches. Jimmy Kuzmanovski was the club's top goal-scorer with 9 league and cup goals. At the conclusion of the season Kuzmanovski was awarded the CPSL Rookie of the Year award. Under their new title of Durham Flames, and under the leadership of Danny Stewart the club again failed to reach the championship playoffs in the 2001 and 2002 seasons. Though Durham failed to reach the postseason they received the CPSL Fair Play award in 2001.

In their final season in 2003 in the Eastern Conference the club struggled, winning just one of their 18 league matches. This contrasted with their performance in the Open Canada Cup when they reached the Cup Final weekend before losing 4–1 to London City in a wild card game on 29 August 2003. The Flames last ever match was played on 30 September 2003 when they went down 3–1 away to Vaughan Sun Devils. On October 5, 2003, the organization was awarded their second CPSL Fair Play award for being the most disciplined team.

It was reported in the local press that The Flames were excluded from the League in December 2003, their franchise having been revoked following their failure to pay league fees and fines. Durham Storm took over their slot for home games in Oshawa's Civic Stadium on Friday nights. However The Storm bought the Mississauga Olympians franchise and did not take over the Durham Flames franchise.

== Season to season ==
| Season | League | Pos. | Pl. | W | D | L | GS | GA | P | Playoffs | League Cup | Club name |
|---|---|---|---|---|---|---|---|---|---|---|---|---|
| 1999 | Canadian Professional Soccer League | 5 | 14 | 3 | 6 | 7 | 19 | 26 | 14 | Did not qualify | Semi-final | Oshawa Flames |
| 2000 | Canadian Professional Soccer League | 7 | 14 | 2 | 9 | 3 | 22 | 35 | 9 | Did not qualify | Group stage | Oshawa Flames |
| 2001 | Canadian Professional Soccer League | 10 | 22 | 7 | 3 | 12 | 39 | 53 | 24 | Did not qualify | Group stage | Durham Flames |
| 2002 | Canadian Professional Soccer League (East) | 5 | 19 | 7 | 2 | 10 | 28 | 44 | 23 | Did not qualify | | Durham Flames |
| 2003 | Canadian Professional Soccer League (East) | 6 | 18 | 1 | 1 | 16 | 28 | 73 | 9 | Did not qualify | | Durham Flames |

== First team squad 2003 ==
The following players represented Durham Flames in their final season: Note: Flags indicate national team as defined under FIFA eligibility rules; some limited exceptions apply. Players may hold more than one non-FIFA nationality.

| No. | Pos. | Nation | Player |
|---|---|---|---|
| 1 | GK | CAN | Serge Desbiens |
| 1 | GK | CAN | Daniel Baker |
| 2 | | CAN | Jason Davis |
| 3 | DF | CAN | Luke Brown |
| 4 | FW | CAN | Jahmo Welsh |
| 5 | DF | CAN | Mark Melo |
| 6 | DF | CAN | Roger Badley |
| 8 | | CAN | Ryan Dummett |
| 9 | | CAN | Mike Mason |
| 10 | MF | CAN | Dan Sadler |
| 11 | | CAN | Jamal Jupiter |
| 12 | | CAN | Jonathan Briggs |
| 13 | DF | CAN | Kwamie Wafie-Annoh |

| No. | Pos. | Nation | Player |
|---|---|---|---|
| 14 | MF | CAN | Adam Vickers |
| 15 | | CAN | Zamar Brown |
| 16 | DF | CAN | Laurence Ledwidge |
| 17 | | CAN | Sean Caresdilero |
| 18 | FW | CAN | Danny Mattin |
| 19 | | CAN | Javed Hakim |
| 20 | | CAN | David Mills |
| 21 | MF | CAN | Desmond Humphrey |
| 22 | GK | CAN | Brandon Cedar |

== Club administration 2003 ==
The key officials of the club during the last season were:

- Steve Kralj - President
- Carlos De sousa - Vice President
- Frank Kralj - Treasurer
- Stan Bombino - Technical Director
- Jack Methven - Manager
- Steve Hamill - Head Coach
- Tony Cabral - Assistant Coach
- Matt Gurr - Goalkeeper Coach

== Head coaches ==
| Years | Name | Nation |
|---|---|---|
| 1999 | Jens Kraemer | Canada |
| 2000 | Stan Bombino | Canada |
| 2001 | Danny Stewart | Canada |
| 2002-2003 | Steve Hamill | Canada |
