= Victoria Park Stadium =

Sports stadium

- Interactive map of Victoria Park Stadium
- Coordinates: 43.704189°N 79.69954°W
- Operator: City of Brampton
- Surface: Grass

Tenants
- Brampton Stallions (CPSL) (2001-2006); Brampton United (CSL) (2008-)

The Victoria Park Stadium is soccer venue located in Brampton, Ontario and is home to Brampton United of the Canadian Soccer League. The stadium is located on 20 Victoria Crescent, Brampton. The stadium is part of the James F. McCurry Victoria Park Arena. The stadium hosted the 2004 CPSL Championship final which featured Vaughan Shooters against Toronto Croatia. On May 27, 2016 a fire erupted at the Victoria Park arena.
