= Ottawa Wizards =

Former Canadian soccer club

- Full name: Ottawa Wizards
- Nickname: The Wizards
- Founded: 2001
- Dissolved: 2003
- Stadium: OZ Optics Stadium
- Capacity: 1,000
- Owner: Omur Sezerman
- League: Canadian Professional Soccer League
- 2003: 1st, Eastern; Playoffs:Withdrew

Ottawa Wizards was a Canadian soccer club that played in the Canadian Professional Soccer League (CPSL) from 2001 to 2003. The team's home stadium was the OZ Optics Stadium. Though the team had a relatively short tenure with the CPSL, the club dominated the league by winning three consecutive regular season championships, two Open Canada Cups, and the CPSL Championship. Despite the club's success, the league revoked its franchise in 2003 after several legal disputes with the CPSL ownership.

== History ==
Ottawa Wizards entered the CPSL in 2001, joining three other expansion teams the Toronto Supra, Montreal Dynamites, and the Brampton Hitmen. Under head coach Rasim Kara who previously coached Division 1 clubs in Turkey; brought in Trinidad and Tobago national team players Shurland David, Richard Goddard, Kevin Nelson and players with USL experience like Vladimir Edouard, and Sanjeev Parmar. The club debuted on June 1, 2001, with the opening fixture resulting in a scoreless draw with London City. Ottawa would pick up from their draw with an impressive 5 game undefeated streak which included Open Canada Cup matches. After their defeat to Toronto Croatia, the Wizards bounced back with another 15 game undefeated streak. Throughout the whole season, Ottawa challenged league giants Toronto Olympians for the top spot in the standings; eventually finishing first in the standings the first club to defeat the Olympians regular season winning dynasty. Ottawa finished as the highest scoring team with Kevin Nelson winning the CSL Golden Boot, CSL Rookie of the Year, and Abraham Osman receiving the Canadian Soccer League MVP Award. The Wizards added more silverware to their cabinet by winning the Open Canada Cup, thus becoming the second team in CPSL history in achieving a double.

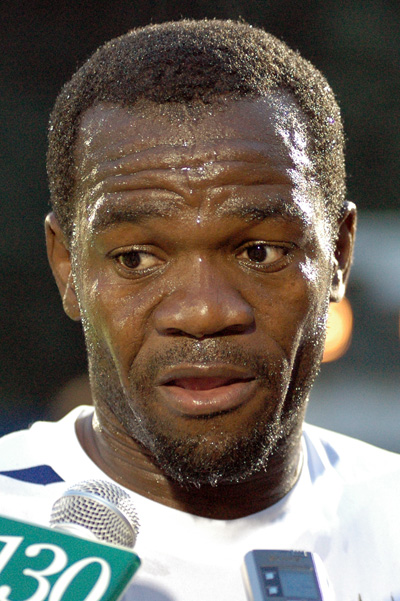
Canadian international Charles Gbeke played earlier in his career with Ottawa Wizards.

As the regular season champions, Ottawa automatically qualified for the playoffs, but their postseason run was rather a disappointment losing in the semi-finals against eventual playoff champions St. Catharines Wolves to a score of 1–0. Though eliminated from the playoffs, Ottawa featured in a Consolation Final of the Rogers Playoff Cup against the Toronto Olympians, but were defeated by a score of 5–2. Head coach Kara left at the end of 2001, and he was replaced by Klaus Linnenbruegger who brought in additional new signings to the club; acquiring former Montreal Impact defender Abraham Francois, and several African imports like Urbain Some, Peter Mponda, and Sa Brahima Traore. During the 2002 season, Ottawa had another tremendous season recording a 17-game undefeated streak, and making another milestone in CPSL history by becoming the second club to achieve a treble the first being the Toronto Olympians. The Wizards clinched the Eastern Conference and finished first in the overall standings. They repeated their success in the Open Canada Cup tournament by defending their title once more in a 1–0 victory over Toronto Croatia with the lone goal from Kevin Nelson.

In the postseason, the Wizards faced the Metro Lions in the semi-finals and advanced to the finals with a 1–0 victory over the Lions. The Rogers Cup final was played at Esther Shiner Stadium, where Ottawa faced the North York Astros the outcome of the game was a 2–0 victory for Ottawa with goals coming from Robin Hart, and an own goal from North York. At the conclusion of the season Abraham Osman was awarded for the second time in a row the CPSL MVP Award at the CPSL Awards Banquet. In 2003, head coach Linnenbruegger was replaced by former Wizards player Hubert Busby, Jr. Busby brought in Malawi international McDonald Yobe, and signed two promising Canadian players Alen Marcina, and Charles Gbeke. Ottawa began the season with dominance once more by becoming the second team in the league's history to go undefeated; allowing the club to clinch its third consecutive division title. Unfortunately the Wizards ran into problems with the CPSL administration – one incident regarding the club was the removal of Ottawa from the Open Canada Cup tournament, thus not allowing the team to defend its title. In response to the league's decision Ottawa's owner Omur Sezerman countered that he would obtain an injunction and planned to sue the league and certain individuals associated with the league.

The dispute was taken to the Superior Court of Justice who ruled in favour with the CPSL; dismissing the injunction and allowing the tournament to proceed. On September 10, 2003, Hubert Busby resigned as head coach after philosophical differences with the team owner; leaving the Wizards with eight wins, four ties, and zero losses. Busby was replaced by last season's head coach Klaus Linnenbruegger. After qualifying for the postseason by clinching their division and going undefeated for the entire season, the Wizards announced their withdrawal from the Rogers Cup stating disagreement with the rules of competition. At the conclusion of the season two Ottawa players received awards one being McDonald Yobe as Rookie of the Year, and Simon Eaddy winning the Goalkeeper of the Year award. On December 3, 2003, the CPSL board of directors announced the franchises of Ottawa and the Durham Flames were revoked.

== Head coaches ==
Years	Name	Nation
2001	Rasim Kara	Turkey
2002–2003	Klaus Linnenbruegger	Germany
2003	Hubert Busby, Jr.	Canada
2003	Klaus Linnenbruegger	Germany

== Achievements ==
- CPSL Championship: 2002
- Open Canada Cup: 2001, 2002
- Canadian Professional Soccer League Eastern Conference Champions/Regular Season: 2001, 2002, 2003

== Year-by-year ==
Year	Division	League	Regular season	Playoffs
2001	1	CPSL	First	Semi-finals
2002	1 - Eastern Conference	CPSL	First	Champions
2003	1 - Eastern Conference	CPSL	First	Withdrew

== Notable players ==
Canada

- Roldege Arius (2003)
- Hubert Busby, Jr. (2003)
- Abraham François (2002)
- Charles Gbeke (2003)
- Alen Marcina (2002-03)
- Charles Gbeke (2008)
- Sanjeev Parmar (2001-02)

Burkina Faso

- Urbain Some (2002-03)
- Sa Brahima Traore (2002-03)

Haiti

- Vladimir Edouard (2001)

Malawi

- Peter Mponda (2002-03)
- McDonald Yobe (2003)

Trinidad and Tobago

- Shurland David (2001-02)
- Richard Goddard (2001)
- Robin Hart (2001-03)
- Kevin Nelson (2001-03)
