= Hubert Busby Jr. =

Jamaican footballer and manager

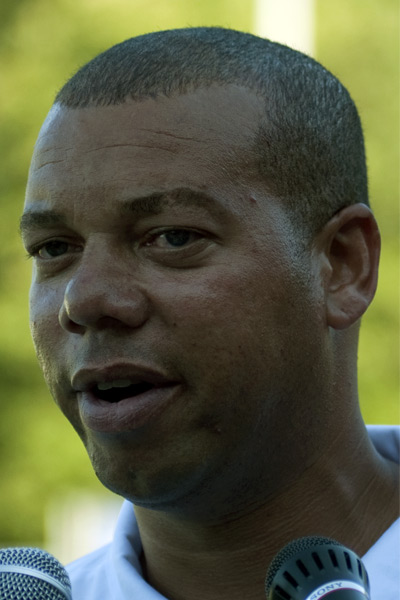

Personal information
- Date of birth: 18 June 1969 (age 57)
- Place of birth: Kingston, Ontario, Canada
- Position: Goalkeeper

Senior career*
Years	Team	Apps	(Gls)
1994	Detroit Wheels	?	(?)
1995	Telstar	?	(?)
1996	Montreal Impact	0	(0)
1998	Toronto Lynx	18	(0)
1999	Caldas Sport Clube	?	(?)
2000	Oxford United	1	(0)
2000	Crystal Palace	0	(0)
2001	Vancouver Whitecaps FC	?	(?)
2003	Ottawa Wizards	1	(0)

International career
2001–2003	Jamaica		

Managerial career
- 2003: Ottawa Wizards
- 2004: Ottawa St. Anthony Italia
- 2005: Toronto Lynx
- 2006: AFC Leopards
- 2010–2012: Vancouver Whitecaps Women
- 2013–2018: Seattle Sounders Women
- 2018–2019: Jacksonville Dolphins Women (assistant)
- 2018–2019: Jamaica Women (assistant)
- 2020-2021: Jamaica Women
- 2024–: Jamaica Women
- * Club domestic league appearances and goals

Hubert Busby Junior (born 18 June 1969) is a football manager and former player. Born in Canada, he represented Jamaica at international level.

== Playing career ==
In 1993, Busby Jr. played in the Canadian National Soccer League with Windsor Wheels. As a player, Busby Jr. spent time with the Toronto Lynx, Montreal Impact, Vancouver Whitecaps, Oxford United, Crystal Palace, Caldas Sport Clube, and Ottawa Wizards. In 1996, he played in the Canadian National Soccer League with Oakville Canadian Western.

Busby Jr. played for the Jamaica national football team from 2001 to 2003.

== Management career ==
After retiring from soccer, Busby Jr. earned a degree in sociology from Queen's University, and earned his USSF "A" license and NSCAA "A" diploma with over 10 years of diversified coaching experience including the women's programs at Fairleigh Dickinson University and Queen's University.

His first professional coaching experience was in 2003 with the Ottawa Wizards, where he led he Wizards to a conference title and clinched a playoff spot. During the playoffs the Ottawa Wizards Board handed a two days notice to the Canadian Soccer League in withdrawing from the playoffs. As a result, from that the CSL revoked the franchise.

In 2004, he was named Canadian Youth Team Coach for the National Training Centre in Eastern Canada and Technical Director for the Kanata Soccer Club. As well he served as the head coach for the Ottawa St. Anthony Italia he won the Ontario Cup and help the team finish runners up to the Windsor Border Stars in the Open Canada Cup.

In 2005, he was named the new Head Coach for the Toronto Lynx, where he had a disappointing season finishing with a league worst three wins, 17 losses, and eight ties the worst performance in league history and 12th place in the 12 team league. After one season with the Lynx he left the head coach role.

After leaving the Lynx in 2006 he coached the AFC Leopards of the VMSL Premier B Division, and led them to the Imperial Cup but lost in the quarter-finals to Westside FC. He left the Leopards to become the Whitecaps FC Academy's NSPPP Technical Coordinator. On 16 December 2009 was named as the successor of Bob Birarda as Vancouver Whitecaps Women head coach and left the Whitecaps FC Academy.

In 2013, Busby signed on as Head Coach and general manager for the Seattle Sounders Women.

In 2019, Busby served as an assistant coach with the Jamaica women's national team during qualification and for the 2019 FIFA Women's World Cup in France.

In 2020, he was named Head Coach for the Jamaica Women's national team for Olympic qualifying.

In 2021, The Guardian reported that he was accused by a former player of attempting to solicit sex from her during a recruiting process when he was in charge of the Vancouver Whitecaps women’s team.

After a three-year hiatus, he was re-appointed as the Jamaican Women's head coach after FIFA's Ethics Committee closed their preliminary investigation into allegations against Busby without reaching any judgment. FIFA stated that it may reopen its investigation if it receives more information about the original claims.
