= 2005 Canadian Professional Soccer League season =

Canadian Professional Soccer League
- Season: 2005
- Champions: Oakville Blue Devils
- Regular Season title: Vaughan Shooters (Eastern Conference); Hamilton Thunder (Western Conference)
- Matches: 132
- Goals: 411 (3.11 per match)
- Top goalscorer: Aaron Byrd (Windsor Border Stars)
- Best goalkeeper: Haidar Al-Shaïbani
- Biggest home win: Toronto Supra 8-2 North York Astros (June 19, 2005)
- Biggest away win: Durham Storm 1-12 Oakville Blue Devils (September 22, 2005)

The 2005 Canadian Professional Soccer League season was the 8th season for the Canadian Professional Soccer League. The season began on May 21, 2005, and concluded on October 10, 2005, with Oakville Blue Devils defeating Vaughan Shooters 2–1 to win their first CPSL Championship. The final was played at Esther Shiner Stadium, which gave North York Astros a playoff wildcard match. In the regular season the Vaughan Shooters won their first Eastern Conference title, while Hamilton Thunder secured their third Western Conference title. The league increased in membership with the return of the Laval Dynamites. For the first time in the league's history the CPSL introduced a Women's Canada Cup tournament, which included 6 district all-star teams from the existing men's soccer districts.

== Changes from the 2004 season ==
The season saw the resignation of chairman/president Vince Ursini in order to fully devote his time to his Ontario Soccer Association duties. His replacement was the CPSL management consultant Cary Kaplan to the newly created position of CPSL Commissioner. The league increased to 12 teams with the return of Laval Dynamites, while the Metro Lions relocated to the Halton Region territory to form the Oakville Blue Devils. The Brampton Hitmen were sold to Joe Fuliere, who renamed the team to the Brampton Stallions.

== Teams ==
Team	City	Stadium	Manager
Brampton Stallions	Brampton, Ontario (Bramalea)	Victoria Park Stadium	Ken Dawson
Durham Storm	Oshawa, Ontario (Vanier)	Oshawa Civic Stadium	Doug Paterson
London City	London, Ontario (Westmount)	Cove Road Stadium	Harry Gauss
Hamilton Thunder	Hamilton, Ontario	Brian Timmis Stadium	Jorge Armua
Laval Dynamites	Laval, Quebec	Centre Sportif Bois-de-Boulogne	Jean Robert Toussaint
North York Astros	Toronto, Ontario (North York)	Esther Shiner Stadium	Dejan Gluščević
Oakville Blue Devils	Oakville, Ontario (Bronte)	Bronte Stadium	Duncan Wilde
St. Catharines Wolves	St. Catharines, Ontario (Vansickle)	Club Roma Stadium	Tom Bernadi
Toronto Croatia	Mississauga, Ontario (Streetsville)	Memorial Park	Velimir Crljen
Toronto Supra	Toronto, Ontario (Brockton)	Brockton Stadium	Cesar Garcia
Vaughan Shooters	Vaughan, Ontario (Woodbridge)	Ontario Soccer Centre	Carmine Isacco
Windsor Border Stars	Windsor, Ontario	Windsor Stadium	Pat Hilton

Location of CPSL teams outside of Toronto for the 2005 CPSL season.
Western Conference Eastern Conference
Location of CPSL teams in Toronto for the 2005 CPSL season.
Western Conference Eastern Conference

== Final standings ==
=== Eastern Conference ===
Pos	Team	Pld	W	D	L	GF	GA	GD	Pts	Qualification
1	Vaughan Shooters	22	16	3	3	55	16	+39	51	Qualification for Playoffs
2	Toronto Croatia	22	13	6	3	44	19	+25	45	Qualification for Playoffs
3	Laval Dynamites	22	11	3	8	36	25	+11	36	Qualification for Playoffs
4	Toronto Supra	22	7	8	7	39	30	+9	29	
5	North York Astros	22	8	4	10	31	42	−11	28	Qualification for Playoffs
6	Durham Storm	22	1	1	20	10	85	−75	4	

Updated to match(es) played on October 4, 2005. Source: http://www.rocketrobinsoccerintoronto.com/reports05/05cpwk21.htm
Rules for classification: 1) points; 2) goal difference; 3) number of goals scored.

=== Western Conference ===
Pos	Team	Pld	W	D	L	GF	GA	GD	Pts	Qualification
1	Hamilton Thunder	22	10	7	5	27	23	+4	37	Qualification for Playoffs
2	Oakville Blue Devils	22	10	7	5	46	26	+20	37	Qualification for Playoffs
3	Windsor Border Stars	22	8	4	10	40	35	+5	28	Qualification for Playoffs
4	St. Catharines Wolves	22	7	5	10	21	26	−5	26	
5	London City	22	6	4	12	26	39	−13	22	
6	Brampton Stallions	22	5	8	9	36	45	−9	23	

Updated to match(es) played on October 4, 2005. Source: http://www.rocketrobinsoccerintoronto.com/reports05/05cpwk21.htm
Rules for classification: 1) points; 2) goal difference; 3) number of goals scored.

== CPSL Championship playoffs ==
=== Quarterfinals ===
October 5, 2005	Oakville Blue Devils	3–1	Windsor Border Stars	Toronto, Ontario
9:00 ET	Shawn Faria 42'; Aaron Steele 53'; Sergio De Luca 90'	(Report)	Filip Rocca 78'	Stadium: Centennial Park Stadium; Attendance: 30

October 6, 2005	Toronto Croatia	1–0	Laval Dynamites	Mississauga, Ontario
8:30 ET	Leo Laurito 3'	(Report)		Stadium: Memorial Park; Attendance: 125; Referee: Vito Curali (Ontario)

=== Wildcard ===
October 7, 2005	North York Astros	0–1 (a.e.t.)	Toronto Croatia	Toronto, Ontario
8:00 ET		(Report)	Velimir Crljen 102'	Stadium: Esther Shiner Stadium; Attendance: 120; Referee: Andrew Jasinski (Ontario)

=== Semifinals ===
October 8, 2005	Hamilton Thunder	0–2	Oakville Blue Devils	Toronto, Ontario
2:00 ET		(Report)	Ian Sinclair 31'; Marko Bedenikovic 75'	Stadium: Esther Shiner Stadium; Attendance: 120; Referee: Mike Roeken (Ontario)

October 8, 2005	Vaughan Shooters	4–0	Toronto Croatia	Toronto, Ontario
5:00 ET	Matthew Palleschi 28'; Matthew Palleschi 40'; Matthew Palleschi 56'; Desi Humphrey 74'	(Report)		Stadium: Esther Shiner Stadium; Attendance: 100; Referee: Joe Fletcher (Ontario)

=== CPSL Championship ===
October 10
4:00 ET

Vaughan Shooters	1–2 (a.e.t.)	Oakville Blue Devils
Stalin Cardenas 36'	Report	Sergio De Luca 46'; Ryan Gamble 100'

Esther Shiner Stadium, Toronto, Ontario
Attendance: 728
Referee: Andre Jasinski (Ontario)

GK	1	(Canada) Brian Bowes
RB	17	Raj Takhar
CB	8	Chris Turner
CB	2	(Canada) Angelo Pollastrone (c)
LB	11	(Canada) Fitzroy Christie	(substituted off) 19'
RM	13	(Canada) Frank Bruno
CM	21	(Saint Kitts and Nevis) Darryl Gomez
CM	12	Danny Sanna
LM	19	(Canada) Desmond Humphrey
ST	5	(Canada) Stalin Cardenas	(substituted off) 68'
ST	15	(Canada) Matthew Palleschi
Substitutes:
GK	0	Pablo Alvarado
DF	16	(Canada) Justin Phillips
DF	4	Jorge Molina	(substituted on) 19'
MF	7	(Canada) Cameron Medwin
FW	9	(Canada) Jason De Thomasis	(substituted on) 68' (substituted off) 98'
FW	23	Aundrae Rollins	(substituted on) 98'
FW	10	(Canada) Joey Todaro
Manager:
(Canada) Carmine Isacco

GK	1	(Burkina Faso) Sa Brahima Traore
RB	4	Lovemore Ncube
CB	6	(England) Aaron Steele
CB	2	(Canada) Jamie Fairweather
LB	5	(Canada) Marko Bedenikovic
RM	3	Nicholas Poku	(substituted off) 87'
CM	9	(Canada) Shawn Faria
LM	13	(Canada) Phil Ionadi (c)	(substituted off) 73'
FM	8	(Canada) Sergio De Luca
FW	17	(Canada) Jeremy Shepherd	(substituted off) 90'
FW	15	Ian Sinclair
Substitutes:
GK	0	Chris Baker
MF	7	Omar Samuels
MF	14	Dragisa Klisara	(substituted on) 56' (substituted off) 83'
MF	19	(Canada) Orlin Chalmers	(substituted on) 83'
MF	10	(Serbia and Montenegro) Igor Prostran	(substituted on) 73'
FW	11	(Romania) Gabriel Pop
FW	16	(South Africa) Ryan Gamble	(substituted on) 90'
Manager:
(England) Duncan Wilde

Assistant referees:
John Oliva
Cosmo Iavazzi
Fourth official:
Rob Burns

== All-Star Game ==
The 2005 CPSL all-star match was against Rangers F.C. of the Scottish Premier League who were in Canada for a nine-day training camp before kicking off their season. The game was played at Varsity Stadium, but was closed to the public being only open to people associated to the league.

July 9, 2005	CPSL All-Stars	1 - 4	Glasgow Rangers FC	Toronto, Ontario
6:00 pm	Gabriel Pop 90'	Report	Ross McCormack 53'; Jukka Santala 81'; Ross McCormack 82'; Steve Thompson 88'	Stadium: Varsity Stadium; Attendance: 200

CPSL Selects
Pos.	Name	Team
Squad
GK	Michael Silva	Toronto Supra
D	Fuseini Dauda	Hamilton Thunder
D	Aaron Steele	Oakville Blue Devils
D	Fitzroy Powell	Durham Storm
D	Justin Phillips	Vaughan Shooters
MF	Darren Baxter	Oakville Blue Devils
MF	Igor Prostran	Oakville Blue Devils
MF	Sergio De Luca	Oakville Blue Devils
MF	Eris Tafaj	London City
F	Hugo Herrera	Brampton Stallions
F	Carlo Arghittu	St. Catharines Wolves
Squad
GK	Roberto Ferrari	Hamilton Thunder
DF	Johnny Annisi	Hamilton Thunder
DF	Craig Williams	Durham Storm
DF	Danny Gallacher	St. Catharines Wolves
DF	Joseph Feifoo	North York Astros
MF	Dennis Peeters	London City
MF	Marcus Chorvat	Windsor Border Stars
MF	Ricardo Marquez	Hamilton Thunder
MF	Zeljko Dukic	Hamilton Thunder
MF	Daniel Milojevic	Hamilton Thunder
F	Gabriel Pop	Oakville Blue Devils
Head coach
	Jorge Armua	Hamilton Thunder

== Top goal scorers ==
Rank	Player	Club	Goals
1	(United States) Aaron Byrd	Windsor Border Stars	17
2	(Romania) Gabriel Pop	Oakville Blue Devils	14
3	Radek Papiez	Windsor Border Stars	10
4	(Canada) Danny Amaral	Toronto Supra	9
5	(Canada) Jason De Thomasis	Vaughan Shooters	9
6	Karim Ben Sari	London City	9
7	(Canada) Mike DiLuca	Toronto Supra	9
8	(Argentina) Hugo Herrera	Brampton Stallions	9
9	Mohamed Ridouani	Laval Dynamites	9
10	(Trinidad and Tobago) Hayden Fitzwilliams	Toronto Croatia	8

Updated: September 30, 2005

== CPSL Executive Committee ==
A list of the 2005 CPSL Executive Committee.

Position	Name	Nationality
Commissioner:	Cary Kaplan	(Canada) Canadian
Director of Media:	Stan Adamson	(England) English
Director of Discipline:	Clifford Dell	(Canada) Canadian
Director of Officials:	Walter Kirchner	(Romania) Romanian
Office Administrator:	Janet Leonard	(Canada) Canadian
Community Services:	Peter Li Preti	(Canada) Canadian
Legal Counsel:	Ira Greenspoon	(Canada) Canadian

== Awards ==
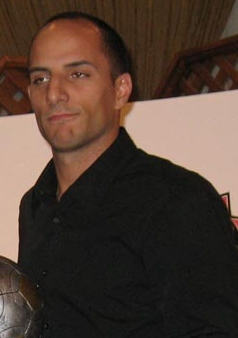
Fil Rocca was voted the Defender of the Year

The annual CPSL awards ceremony was held at the La Contessa Banquet Hall on October 9, 2005, in North York, Toronto. This was the first awards ceremony where the awards were distributed equally without a majority winner. Vaughan, Windsor, London, and North York each went home with two awards. Vaughan's Desmond Humphrey was voted the MVP, while team owner Tony De Thomasis was given the President of the Year award. London City went home with the Goalkeeper and Rookie of the Year awards with Haidar Al-Shaibani and Dennis Peeters as its recipients.

Former Detroit Titans alumni Aaron Byrd of Windsor Border Stars won the Golden Boot. Windsor's Fil Rocca was voted the Defender of the Year. The Coach of the Year went to former S.League, and USL A-League veteran Dejan Gluscevic, who went on to manage various national youth teams in Asia. North York Astros also received their first Fair Play award. Andrzej Jasinski the match official for the championship final was voted the Referee of the Year.

Award	Player (Club)
CPSL Most Valuable Player	Desmond Humphrey (Vaughan Shooters)
CPSL Golden Boot	Aaron Byrd (Windsor Border Stars)
CPSL Goalkeeper of the Year Award	Haidar Al-Shaïbani (London City)
CPSL Defender of the Year Award	Fil Rocca (Windsor Border Stars)
CPSL Rookie of the Year Award	Dennis Peeters (London City)
CPSL Coach of the Year Award	Dejan Gluscevic (North York Astros)
CPSL President of the Year Award	Tony De Thomasis (Vaughan Shooters)
CPSL Referee of the Year Award	Andrzej Jasinski
CPSL Fair Play Award	North York Astros

== Women's Canada Cup ==
A women's league debuted in 2005 which featured 6 all-star teams from the existing municipal soccer districts where the men's team competed. Throughout the regular season they played in 10 matches with London City Selects winning the regular season title. The finals featured London City against York Region Lady Shooters, where York Region won the championship.

=== Teams ===
Team	City
Durham Region Allstars	Oshawa, Ontario
London City Selects	London, Ontario
North York District Allstars	Toronto, Ontario
Toronto Supra District Allstars	Toronto, Ontario
York Region Lady Shooters	Vaughan, Ontario
Windsor Border Stars Women	Windsor, Ontario
