= Theo Zagar =

Canadian former goalkeeper (born 1974)

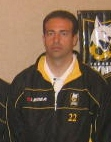
- Zagar in 2006

Personal information
- Full name: Theodosis Zagar
- Date of birth: November 2, 1974 (age 52)
- Place of birth: East York, Canada
- Height: 6 ft 3 in (1.91 m)
- Position: Goalkeeper

Youth career
- 1997: Scarborough Azzurri

Senior career*
Years	Team	Apps	(Gls)
1998–2003	Toronto Lynx	115	(0)
2000–2001	Toronto ThunderHawks (indoor)	13	(0)
2004	Rochester Raging Rhinos	20	(0)
2005–2006	Toronto Lynx	39	(0)

Managerial career
- 2006: Toronto Lynx (assistant coach)
- * Club domestic league appearances and goals

Theodosis Zagar (born November 2, 1974) is a Canadian former goalkeeper, who had a notable tenure with the Toronto Lynx of the USL First Division, and played indoor soccer in the National Professional Soccer League.

== Playing career ==
Before Zagar went professional he played at the local amateur level with East York Soccer Club. He received a scholarship with the University of Toronto and played with the Toronto Varsity Blues, with whom he recorded the most shutouts in a season in 1997, received first-team honours, and was the OUA MVP, as well as the CIAU MVP. In 1997, he played with Scarborough Azzurri/Blues of the Ontario Soccer League, where he won two Ontario Cups. In 1998, he was drafted by the Toronto Lynx of the USL A-League, and offered a professional contract. During his first season he primarily served as backup for Jim Larkin, and Hubert Busby, Jr.

In 2000, after the departure of Larkin he was made the first choice goalkeeper for the club. Zagar helped his club reach the postseason, and was awarded the club's MVP as well as making the A-League Second All-Star Team. At the conclusion of the season he signed with the Toronto ThunderHawks of the National Professional Soccer League for the indoor winter season. After the departure of Marco Reda he was named the new team captain. At the conclusion of the season he was named the club's MVP for the second time in his career. The following season he made a team record by receiving the team's MVP award for the third time in his career.

On January 8, 2004, Zagar was transferred to division rivals the Rochester Raging Rhinos and signed to a two-year contract. During his tenure with Rochester he helped the team finish second in their division, which secured a postseason berth for the club. In 2005, former teammate Hubert Busby Jr, was appointed the new head coach for the Toronto Lynx organization and brought back Zagar to the fold. In 2006, under new head coach Duncan Wilde, he was appointed to a player-assistant coach role, along with team captain Joe Mattacchione. During the season he helped the Lynx to a team-record 10 game undefeated streak at home, and as well helped the Lynx reach the Open Canada Cup final, which they lost 2-0 against Ottawa St. Anthony Italia. Consequently, the Lynx organization self-relegated itself to the Premier Development League which resulted in the release of all of their players.

Zagar retired from professional soccer after Toronto's relegation and left holding every Lynx goalkeeping record, with the most wins (64), most shutouts (44.5), most saves (665), and most games played (174). After his retirement, he became the U-11 Development Director and Goalkeeper Director for the Oakville Soccer Club in 2007 and briefly served as a commentator for Rogers Television's coverage of the Canadian Soccer League. He currently serves as the Club Technical and Development Director and Head Goalkeeping coach for his old youth club, East York Soccer Club, which his father Dragan Zagar is the long-time president and Tournament Chair for the East York Soccer League.

== Achievements ==
- Toronto Lynx Most Valuable Player Award 2000, 2002, 2003
- A-league Second All- Star Team 2000
