= Marko Bedenikovic =

Canadian soccer player (born 1984)

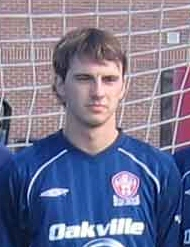
- Bedenikovic in 2005

Personal information
- Full name: Marko Bedenikovic
- Date of birth: June 18, 1983 (age 43)
- Place of birth: Mississauga, Ontario, Canada
- Height: 6 ft 1 in (1.85 m)
- Position: Defensive midfielder

College career
Years	Team	Apps	(Gls)
2001–2002	San Francisco Dons		

Senior career*
Years	Team	Apps	(Gls)
2002–2003	Mississauga Olympians		
2004	Toronto Croatia	10	(0)
2005	Oakville Blue Devils	16	(2)
2006	Toronto Lynx	27	(1)
2007–2008	Baltimore Blast (indoor)	9	(2)
2008	Toronto Croatia	12	(0)
2009–2010	Integrál-DAC	7	(1)
2010–2011	Portugal/SC Toronto	25	(4)
2012	HNNK Zagreb		
2018	CSC Mississauga		
2018	Florida Tropics SC (indoor)	1	(0)
2018–2019	Portugal AC (indoor)		

International career
2001	Canada U-17	4	(0)
- * Club domestic league appearances and goals as of 2019 November 27

Marko Bedenikovic (born June 18, 1984) is a Canadian former soccer player who played as a midfielder and defender.

== Club career ==
=== Early career ===
Bedenikovic played at the youth level with Dixie Soccer Club. He received a scholarship in 2001 from the University of San Francisco in order to play at the college level for the San Francisco Dons. He played with San Francisco for two seasons. In 2002, he played in the Canadian Professional Soccer League with the Mississauga Olympians. He continued playing in the CPSL when he signed with Toronto Croatia for the 2004 season. The Croats would go on to claim the CPSL Championship by defeating Vaughan Shooters.

He also had several trials throughout Europe with clubs such as Lombard Pápa, Budapest Honvéd, and TuS Koblenz but ultimately wasn't offered a contract. In 2005, he signed with the expansion franchise Oakville Blue Devils. In early September he received another tryout match in France but wasn't offered a contract. He returned for the remainder of the season and assisted in securing a postseason berth for Oakville. In the second round of the playoffs, he contributed the winning goal against Hamilton Thunder that advanced Oakville to the finals. He featured in the championship final and assisted Oakville in securing the title against Vaughan.

=== Toronto Lynx ===
The following season he signed a contract with the Toronto Lynx of the USL First Division. The signing reunited him with former head coach Duncan Wilde. He made his debut on April 22, against Virginia Beach Mariners. He helped Toronto reach the final of the Open Canada Cup but was defeated by Ottawa St. Anthony Italia. In his debut season with the Lynx, he appeared in 27 matches and recorded one goal.

=== Europe ===
In 2008, he also played in a match with the reserve team of Toronto FC. He returned to his former team Toronto Croatia and assisted the Croats in winning the 2007 Croatian World Club Championship. He contributed a goal against Canberra Croatia FC which helped Croatia to claim the title.

In 2009, he played abroad in Hungary's Nemzeti Bajnokság II with Integrál-DAC, where he appeared in seven matches and scored a single goal. Unfortunately, the club ceased operations in late 2009, which resulted in the termination of his contract.

=== Canada ===
After a stint in Europe, he returned to Canada for the 2010 CSL season to sign with Portugal FC. He assisted Portugal in securing a postseason berth and recorded a goal in the playoffs in the second round against Milltown F.C. The following season Portugal FC was renamed SC Toronto and he assisted the club in securing the First Division title.

Bedenikovic would later play in the Ontario Soccer League with HNNK Zagreb in 2012. In 2018, he returned to the Canadian Soccer League to play with CSC Mississauga.

=== Indoor career ===
After the relegation of Toronto to the Premier Development League, he played at the indoor level with Baltimore Blast in the Major Indoor Soccer League. He played in nine matches and recorded two goals for Baltimore.

On December 6, 2018, Bedenikovic and six other players were signed by the Major Arena Soccer League's Florida Tropics SC. The high volume of signings was necessitated by issues with Canadian immigration laws, as the Tropics were due to play the Mississauga MetroStars on December 8. For the remainder of the indoor season, he played in the Mississauga-centered Arena Premier League with Portugal AC.

== International career ==
Bedenikovic was called to the Canada men's national under-17 soccer team camp in 2001.

== Honors ==
Toronto Croatia

- CPSL Championship: 2004
- Croatian World Club Championship: 2007

Oakville Blue Devils

- CPSL Championship: 2005
