= Jeremy Shepherd =

Canadian former soccer player (born 1985)

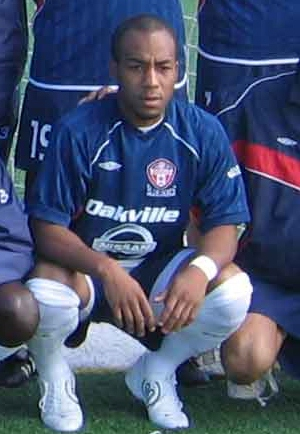
- Shepherd in 2005

Personal information
- Full name: Jeremy Shepherd
- Date of birth: April 8, 1985 (age 41)
- Place of birth: Brampton, Ontario, Canada
- Height: 5 ft 9 in (1.75 m)
- Position: Striker

Youth career
- 1997–2000: Mississagua Dixie S.C.
- 2000–2004: Toronto Lynx Jrs.

Senior career*
| Years | Team | Apps | (Gls) |
| 2005 | Oakville Blue Devils | 6 | (4) |
| 2006 | Toronto Lynx | 13 | (0) |
| 2008–2011 | Brampton Lions | 68 | (12) |
| 2012 | Brantford Galaxy | 9 | (4) |

International career
| 2001 | U-17 Canada | 3 | (0) |
- * Club domestic league appearances and goals as of 7 May 2010

Jeremy Shepherd (born April 8, 1985) is a Canadian former soccer player who played as a forward.

== Club career ==
=== Youth career ===
Shepherd began playing at the youth level with the Toronto Lynx Jrs in their inaugural season in the Super Y-League in 2000. He also played his youth soccer with Dixie Soccer Club and spent some time in the Hertha Berlin youth system.

=== Oakville ===
After graduating from the Lynx Academy, he signed with the Oakville Blue Devils of the Canadian Professional Soccer League playing under former Director of Lynx Academy Duncan Wilde. On September 11, 2005, he made his debut against St. Catharines Wolves. A week after he recorded his first professional goal on September 15, 2005, against North York Astros. He helped Oakville clinch a postseason by finishing second in the Western Conference. He featured in the CPSL Championship finals match against Vaughan Shooters, and won the championship by a score of 2-1.

=== Toronto Lynx ===
In 2006, when Wilde returned to the Toronto Lynx he signed Shepherd to a contract with the senior team in the USL First Division. He made his debut on April 22, 2006, against the Virginia Beach Mariners. On July 16, 2006, against the Atlanta Silverbacks, he broke his leg in a collision with a Silverback player forcing him to miss the rest of the season. He made 13 appearances with the club in his debut season.

=== CSL ===
After recovering from his injury Shepherd signed with the Brampton Lions for the 2008 CSL season. Shepherd ended his two-year goal drought on September 20 against North York Astros, where he scored two goals in a 3-1 victory. He continued his fine form in a cruising 6-0 victory over London City where he recorded two goals and clinched a playoff spot for the Lions. On May 14, 2009, the Brampton Lions re-signed Shepherd for the 2009 season. Where he helped the club secure a postseason berth by finishing third in the National Division.

He re-signed with Brampton for the 2011 season. In his fourth season with Brampton, he assisted in securing a postseason berth by finishing fourth in the First Division. After a four-year tenure in Brampton, he was recruited by Ron Davidson to sign with Brantford Galaxy for the 2012 season. He made his debut for the club on May 6, 2012, against the York Region Shooters. He recorded his first goal and a hat-trick on June 17, 2012, against SC Waterloo Region.

After the dismissal of head coach Ron Davidson, he along with the other five players left the club in support of Davidson. Though he later returned to Brantford to finish off the remainder of the season.

== International career ==
He made his debut for the Canada men's national under-17 soccer team on April 20, 2001, against the United States in the 2001 CONCACAF U-17 Tournament.

== Honors ==
=== Oakville Blue Devils ===
- CPSL Championship: 2005
