= Matthew Palleschi =

Canadian former soccer player (born 1983)

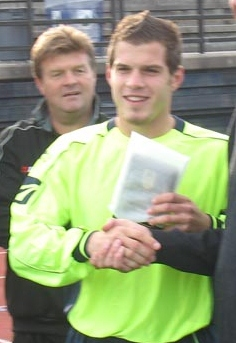
- Palleschi in 2006

Personal information
- Full name: Matthew James Palleschi
- Date of birth: January 11, 1983 (age 43)
- Place of birth: Richmond Hill, Canada
- Height: 5 ft 11 in (1.80 m)
- Position: Striker

Youth career
- 2002–2003: Humber Hawks

Senior career*
Years	Team	Apps	(Gls)
2003	Frosinone Calcio	1	(0)
2003–2005	Vaughan Sun Devils/Shooters	30	(18)
2006	Toronto Lynx	23	(3)
2007–2008	Montreal Impact	26	(3)
2008	Italia Shooters	20	(3)
2014	Richmond Hill Madrid		
- * Club domestic league appearances and goals

Matthew Palleschi (born January 11, 1983) is a Canadian former soccer player who played as a midfielder and forward

== Career ==
=== College career ===
Palleschi played at the college level with the Humber College Hawks, where he was named Team MVP and to the CCAA All-Canadian Team in his rookie year in 2002. In his sophomore season with Humber, he received further accolades by being named a Central West Region League All-Star and received the Canadian Colleges Athletic Association All-Canadian award. In 2003, he assisted Humber in securing a postseason berth and reached the semifinals but was defeated by Algonquin College.

=== Early career ===
He had a brief stint abroad in Italy with Frosinone Calcio in 2003. He made his debut on April 27, 2003, against Acireale. In 2003, he returned to Canada to play in the Canadian Professional Soccer League with Vaughan Sun Devils. In his debut season with Vaughan, he assisted in securing a postseason berth and scored the winning goal in the semifinal match against Hamilton Thunder. In the CPSL Championship final, Vaughan was defeated by the Brampton Hitmen.

He would re-sign with Vaughan for the 2004 season. For the second consecutive season, he helped Vaughan reach the championship final but was defeated by Toronto Croatia. In his third season with Vaughan, he assisted in securing the Western Conference title which clinched a playoff berth for the club. In the opening round of the postseason, he recorded a hattrick against Toronto Croatia which advanced Vaughan to the championship final for the third consecutive season. He appeared in the championship final but this time Vaughan was defeated by Oakville Blue Devils.

=== Toronto and Montreal ===
In the initial stages of the 2006 season, he was offered a trial with Montreal Impact but an injury prevented it from materializing. Shortly after he signed with the Toronto Lynx of the USL First Division. Throughout his tenure with Toronto, he assisted the club in reaching the Open Canada Cup final against Ottawa St. Anthony Italia.

After the relegation of Toronto to the PDL, he signed with league rivals Montreal Impact. On April 21, 2007, he made his Impact debut coming on as a substitute for Mauro Biello, and as well scoring a goal. In total, Palleschi played 26 games for the Impact and scored 3 goals. In the initial stages of the season, he assisted Montreal in achieving an eight-game undefeated streak. He also contributed to Montreal's success in winning the 2007 Voyageurs Cup. The following season Montreal released him from his contract.

In 2008, he returned to his former team Vaughan Shooters later renamed Italia Shooters. He assisted the Shooters in clinching the International Division title. In 2014, he played in the Ontario Soccer League with the Richmond Hill Madrid where he finished as the top goal scorer in the Central Premier division and was named MVP.

== Personal life ==
Palleschi is friends with former Toronto Lynx and Montreal Impact defender and teammate Andres Arango.

== Honors ==
Vaughan/Italia Shooters

- Canadian Professional Soccer League Eastern Conference: 2005
- Canadian Soccer League International Division: 2008

Montreal Impact

- Voyageurs Cup: 2007
