= Aaron Steele (footballer, born 1983) =

English footballer

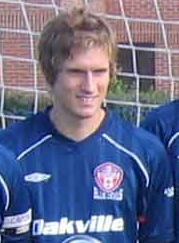
- Aaron Steele in 2005

Personal information
- Date of birth: 4 February 1983 (age 43)
- Place of birth: Norwich, England
- Position: Defender

Senior career*
Years	Team	Apps	(Gls)
2003	Hamilton Thunder	8	(0)
2004	Toronto Lynx	16	(0)
2005	Oakville Blue Devils	21	(0)
2006–2007	Toronto Lynx	5	(0)
- * Club domestic league appearances and goals

Aaron Steele (born 4 February 1983) is an English former professional footballer who played as a defender in the Canadian Professional Soccer League, USL A-League, and Premier Development League.

== Playing career ==
Steele began his professional career in 2003 with Hamilton Thunder of the Canadian Professional Soccer League, where his father Billy Steele served as assistant coach. The following year he signed a contract with the Toronto Lynx of the USL A-League. In his debut season with Toronto he appeared in 16 matches. In 2005, he signed with the Oakville Blue Devils of the Canadian Soccer League. He contributed in Oakville's successful debut season by clinching a postseason berth, and in the quarter finals he scored the second goal in 3–1 victory over the Windsor Border Stars. He featured in the CPSL Championship finals against Vaughan Shooters, and won the match by a score of 2–1.

On 14 July 2006, he returned to play for the Toronto Lynx . He made his return match on 14 July 2006 in an Open Canada Cup game against the Serbian White Eagles. Throughout the season he only appeared in five games due to injuries. He still managed to achieve a franchise record for the Lynx by going undefeated in ten matches at home, and reached the finals of the Open Canada Cup but lost 2–0 to Ottawa St. Anthony Italia.

When the 2006 season came to a conclusion the club owners decided to relegate Toronto two divisions down into the Premier Development League. He remained with the club where he was appointed the new team captain after the retirement of Joe Mattacchione. Unfortunately he missed the entire season when he blew out his knee in a scrimmage match the night before the Toronto Lynx press conference.
