= Joe Mattacchione =

Canadian former soccer player (born 1975)

Personal information
- Full name: Joseph Mattacchione
- Date of birth: August 15, 1975 (age 51)
- Place of birth: Mississauga, Ontario, Canada
- Height: 6 ft 0 in (1.83 m)
- Position: Defender

Youth career
- 1994–1997: UAB Blazers

Senior career*
| Years | Team | Apps | (Gls) |
| 1999–2006 | Toronto Lynx | 165 | (8) |
| 2000–2001 | Toronto ThunderHawks (indoor) | 13 | (1) |
| 2002–2003 | Cleveland Force (indoor) | 31 | (2) |

International career
| 1994 | Canada U-20 | 1 | (0) |
| 2005 | Canada beach soccer team | 3 | (0) |

Managerial career
- 2006: Toronto Lynx (assistant coach)
- * Club domestic league appearances and goals as of July 01, 2015

Joseph Mattacchione (born August 15, 1975) is a Canadian former soccer player who played as a defender.

== Club career ==
=== College career ===
Mattacchione began playing at the youth level with Dixie Soccer Club. He also played at the amateur level in the Toronto and District Soccer League with Mississauga United. He continued playing soccer with his local high school, Father Michael Goetz Secondary School, in Mississauga, Ontario, where he served as team captain and was named the team MVP. In 1994, he received a scholarship to play college soccer for the University of Alabama at Birmingham.

Throughout his tenure at Alabama, he was named to the First Team Rookie All-Conference in 1994 and was a 2-Time UAB Team MVP in 1996 and 1997. In 1997, he was also selected for the All-Conference team. In the winter of 1997, he was drafted by the Montreal Impact's indoor team in the National Professional Soccer League amateur draft but wasn't offered a contract.

=== Toronto Lynx ===
After the completion of his college career, he was drafted by the Toronto Lynx of the USL A-League in 1998. He officially began his professional career when he signed a contract with Toronto for the 1999 season. He recorded his first professional goal on May 30, 1999, against the Jacksonville Cyclones in a 3-2 defeat. The following season, he helped Toronto qualify for the postseason for the second time in the club's history. He featured in the Conference finals against the Rochester Rhinos, where Toronto was eliminated from the playoffs by a score of 2-1 on aggregate goals

Mattacchione re-signed with the Lynx for the 2001 and 2002 seasons. In his fourth season with the club, he received the Best Defensive Player award for his leadership. In 2005, he returned to Toronto for his sixth consecutive season and was chosen the team captain under head coach Hubert Busby, Jr. The following season, he began to transition to the managerial side as he served as an assistant coach under Duncan Wilde. Throughout the 2006 campaign, he assisted Toronto in reaching the finals of the Open Canada Cup, where they were defeated by Ottawa St. Anthony Italia. The 2006 season marked his final year with the Toronto Lynx, where he finished second in the rankings in the club's all-time match appearances.

=== Indoor career ===
After the conclusion of the 2000 A-League season, he signed with the Toronto ThunderHawks in the National Professional Soccer League. In his debut season in the NPSL, he assisted Toronto in securing a postseason berth. He returned to the indoor level in the 2002-03 season when he signed with the Cleveland Force. He appeared in 31 matches and recorded two goals for Cleveland.

== International career ==
In 1994, he made his debut for the Canada men's national under-20 soccer team on August 24, 1994, against Costa Rica. He also appeared in three matches for the Canada national beach soccer team for the 2005 CONCACAF and CONMEBOL Beach Soccer Championship.

== Managerial career ==
In 2006, Mattacchione, along with Theo Zagar, was the assistant coach for the Toronto Lynx under Duncan Wilde. In 2011, he was appointed head coach for the U-11 girls' team for the Oakville Soccer Club.

== Post career ==
After he retired from professional soccer, he became a teacher in the Dufferin-Peel Catholic District School Board.
