= Shawn Faria =

Canadian soccer player (born 1978)

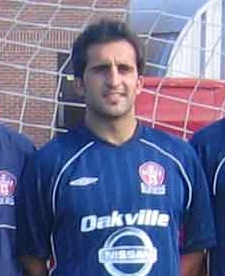
- Faria in 2005

Personal information
- Full name: Shawn Faria
- Date of birth: June 28, 1978 (age 48)
- Place of birth: Mississauga, Ontario
- Height: 6 ft 1 in (1.85 m)
- Position: Midfielder

Youth career
- 1997–1999: University of Louisville

Senior career*
Years	Team	Apps	(Gls)
1999	Toronto Croatia	2	(0)
2002–2005	Toronto Lynx	49	(3)
2002	→ Mississauga Olympians (loan)	4	(0)
2005	Oakville Blue Devils	5	(0)
2006	Toronto Lynx	4	(0)
- * Club domestic league appearances and goals as of 25 January 2015

Shawn Faria (born June 28, 1978) is a Canadian former soccer player who played the majority of his career with the Toronto Lynx in the USL First Division and had several stints with various clubs in the Canadian Soccer League.

== Playing career ==
Faria began playing soccer at the youth level with the University of Louisville from 1997 till 1999. In 1999, Faria signed his first professional contract with Toronto Croatia of the Canadian Professional Soccer League. He made his debut for the club on June 7, 1999, against St. Catharines Wolves in a 2–0 victory. He would return to professional soccer in 2002 to sign with the Toronto Lynx in the USL A-League. He scored his first professional goal July 30, 2002, against the Calgary Storm.

After the 2002 A-League season came to a conclusion he was loaned to the Mississauga Olympians in the CPSL. He made his debut on September 11, 2002, in an Open Canada Cup match against the Toronto Croatia where he scored a goal in a 1–1 draw. He helped the Olympians secure a playoff berth by finishing second in the Western Conference, but unfortunately were defeated by the North York Astros in a wild card match.

Faria was re-signed by the Lynx for the 2003 season on March 18, 2003. On April 7, 2004, his signing was announced in a press conference where he was also appointed the new team captain succeeding Theo Zagar, who was transferred to rivals Rochester Rhinos. He missed most of the season due to a leg injury, but returned to play in 18 matches and score 2 goals. Due to injuries he was released from his contract on June 7, 2005, in order to make room on the roster for new signings. Faria was signed by the expansion franchise Oakville Blue Devils of the Canadian Soccer League, where he helped the Blue Devils reach the playoffs.

In the Western Conference semi-final on October 5, 2005, he scored the opening goal for the Blue Devils, which would result in a 3–2 victory over the Windsor Border Stars. He helped lead Oakville to the CPSL Championship final, where they defeated Vaughan Shooters to a score of 2–1. On August 1, 2006, the Toronto Lynx announced the return of Faria. He helped the Lynx to a 10-game undefeated streak at home, and also reached the finals of the Open Canada Cup, but he did not feature in the match where the Lynx finished runners up to Ottawa St. Anthony Italia losing 2–0. After the 2006 season, the Lynx franchise dropped two divisions down to the PDL, which resulted in the Lynx to release most of their senior players from their contracts. He is now a teacher at St. Roch Secondary School in Brampton, Ontario. Shawn is also a part-time coach for the 2007 North Miss Soccer Club OPDL youth team.

== Managerial career ==
Since retiring from soccer Faria is currently the Director of Female Program and Showcase Team for the Winstars Soccer Academy. Faria coached from 2006 until 2010 the Golden Eagles A team U-14 of the Erin Mills SC.

In November 2023, Faria was appointed as the girl's technical director for Burlington Force Soccer Academy.
