= Armando Costa (soccer) =

Portuguese-Canadian singer, soccer coach, and former player

Personal information
- Full name: Armando (Rilhas) Costa
- Date of birth: July 20, 1949
- Place of birth: Bombarral, Portugal
- Date of death: December 7, 2012 (aged 63)
- Position: Attacking midfielder

Youth career
- 1953–1968: Bombarralense

Senior career*
Years	Team	Apps	(Gls)
1969–1984	Toronto First Portuguese (NSL)		
1980–1982	Buffalo Stallions (MISL) (indoor)		

Managerial career
- 1990: Toronto First Portuguese
- 1991: Toronto Blizzard (assistant)
- 1993–1997: O.S.A. High Performance Academy
- 1998: Toronto Lynx (assistant)
- 2000–2005: Libya U-17 & U-20 (Youth Technical Director)
- 2008–2012: Brampton City United FC
- * Club domestic league appearances and goals

Armando (Rilhas) Costa (July 20, 1949 – December 7, 2012) was a Portuguese Canadian singer, soccer coach and retired player. He was the head coach and Director of Soccer Operations for Brampton City United FC of the Canadian Soccer League until a 2-year battle with lymphoma took his life at the age of 63.

== History ==
Armando Costa, also known as Rilhas, was born in 1949 in the village of Bombarral in central Portugal. He immigrated to Canada, settling in Toronto in 1968 at the age of 18. He was married and had two daughters. Armando made a living of both playing and coaching soccer, but had also sold real estate.

=== Playing career ===
Armando began his soccer career early, playing for the local team, Bombarralense, in Portugal as a youth. After immigrating to Canada in 1968, Costa continued his senior career playing for Toronto First Portuguese of the Canadian National Soccer League until 1984, becoming the longest serving player in the league and winning a championship with the club. Costa joined the Buffalo Stallions of the Major Indoor Soccer League for two seasons, from 1980 to 1982, retiring shortly after.

=== Coaching career ===
After retiring from the professional game, Armando earned his certified "A" coaching license and started his coaching career as head of his old club, Toronto First Portuguese, leading the team to an NSL championship in 1990. He would join the coaching staff of the Canadian Soccer League's Toronto Blizzard the following year in 1991. Costa took over the Ontario Soccer Association's High Performance Academy from 1993 to 1997. He spent one season on the coaching staff of the Toronto Lynx in 1998 before making a trip to Libya at the request of Olympic sprinter Ben Johnson in 1999.

Costa, along with a physiotherapist and nutritionist, would join Johnson as the personal coaches to Al-Saadi Gaddafi, son of Libyan leader Muammar Gaddafi. Costa would coach and befriend the young Gaddafi during his time with Italian side Perugia Calcio, and with the Libyan national football team, eventually becoming the Youth National Teams Technical Director from 2000 to 2005. During this time, Costa was also the head coach of U-17 and U-20 Libyan Olympic teams.

Following his time in Libya, Costa returned home and, after a brief period away from an official role, became the head coach and Director of Soccer Operations for Brampton City United FC of the Canadian Soccer League in 2008 until his death in December 2012.

=== Musical career ===
As a traditional Portuguese singer, Costa released an album in 1988, entitled "Sou quem Sou" (I am who I am).
