= Caswain Mason =

Vincentian former footballer (born 1978)

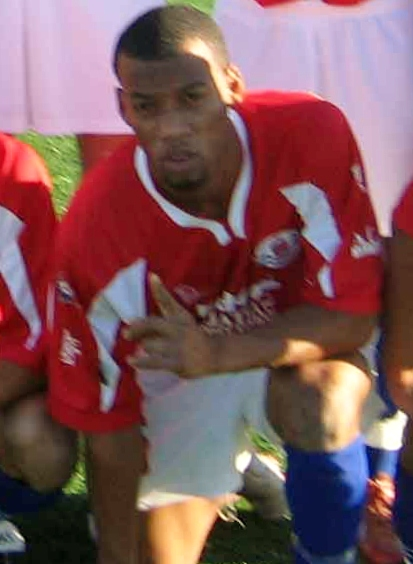
- Mason in 2005

Personal information
- Full name: Caswain Mason
- Date of birth: February 12, 1978 (age 48)
- Place of birth: Saint Vincent and the Grenadines
- Height: 5 ft 8 in (1.73 m)
- Position: Attacking midfielder

Senior career*
Years	Team	Apps	(Gls)
2000	Toronto Olympians	1	(0)
2001	Toronto Lynx	14	(1)
2002–2004	Metro Lions	33	(7)
2005–2006	Toronto Croatia	28	(9)
2007	Mahindra United		
2007	Canadian Lions	4	(0)
2008	Serbian White Eagles	7	(1)

International career
2004–2008	Saint Vincent and the Grenadines	2	(0)
- * Club domestic league appearances and goals as of April 14, 2015

Caswain Mason (born 12 February 1978) is a Vincentian former footballer who played as a midfielder.

== Club career ==
Mason played in the Toronto and District Soccer League in 2000 with GS United. For the remainder of the 2000 season, he played with the Toronto Olympians of the Canadian Professional Soccer League.

In 2001, he played in the USL A-League with the Toronto Lynx. He appeared in 14 matches in his debut season and recorded one goal. After a season in the A-League, he returned to the CPSL to sign with the Metro Lions. He assisted the Scarborough-based team in securing a playoff berth by finishing second in the Eastern Conference.

He re-signed with the Metros for the 2003 season. He appeared in the 2003 Open Canada Cup final where the Lions were defeated by London City in a penalty shootout. Mason returned to Toronto in 2004 for his third and final season with the club. Throughout the season he was named into the CPSL all-star team that would face Boavista FC. He also featured in a notable friendly match against Portmore United F.C. where the proceeds went to the Hurricane Ivan relief fund and in the match he recorded the winning goal.

In 2005, he was transferred to league rivals Toronto Croatia along with Hayden Fitzwilliams. In his debut season with Croatia, he assisted the club in securing a playoff spot. He returned to Toronto the following season and was selected to the All-Star team for the second time in his career and played against Clyde F.C.

He played abroad in the I-League with Mahindra United in 2007. After a season in India he returned to the CSL to play with the Canadian Lions; making his debut on September 19, 2007, against Trois-Rivieres Attak. After the relocation of the Canadian Lions, he signed with league rivals Serbian White Eagles for the 2008 season. In his debut season with the Serbs, he assisted in securing the CSL Championship by defeating Trois-Rivieres in a penalty shootout.

== International career ==
Mason made his debut for Saint Vincent and the Grenadines national football team on May 23, 2004, against Saint Kitts and Nevis. He was also selected for the match against Martinique on May 28, 2004, but failed to make an appearance. He made another appearance for the national team on February 10, 2008 against Grenada.

== Honours ==
Serbian White Eagles

- CSL Championship: 2008
