= Igor Prostran =

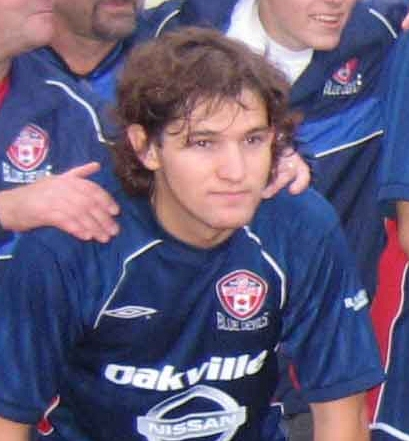
- Prostran in 2005

Personal information
- Date of birth: 29 March 1979 (age 47)
- Place of birth: Zadar, SFR Yugoslavia
- Position: Midfielder

Youth career
- 1989–1993: ONK Smoković
- 1993–1994: Red Star Belgrade
- 1994–1998: Oakville SC
- 1998: Winona Serbs

College career
Years	Team	Apps	(Gls)
1998–1999	McMaster Marauders		

Senior career*
Years	Team	Apps	(Gls)
1999	IM Rakovica		
- Rad
- → Spartak Ljig (loan)
- Beograd
2001–2002	Remont Čačak		
2002–2003	Borac Čačak		
2004	Toronto Lynx	15	(0)
2005	Oakville Blue Devils	20	(5)
2006	Hamilton Serbia		
- * Club domestic league appearances and goals

Igor Prostran (Serbian Cyrillic: Игор Простран, born 29 March 1979) is a Serbian football manager and former player. As player, he played in the Second League of Serbia and Montenegro, USL A-League, and the Canadian Professional Soccer League.

== Playing career ==
Born in Zadar, SR Croatia, then within SFR Yugoslavia, he spent his childhood in the neighbouring village of Smoković which had a Serb majority and family Prostran made about one quarter of the total population. His father Branko was a footballer and later became coach at local club ONK Smoković and later NK Zadar. Igor's younger brother Nikša also plays football and he became a goalkeeper having played in Ontario.

Igor started playing at local ONK Smoković in 1989 when he was 10. However, in 1991 Croatian War of Independence against federal Yugoslav forces and local Serb population started, and, in January 1993, Croatian Army took the town in the Operation Maslenica and destroyed and burned the village. Prostran family left their home and belongings and had to escape, leaving for Serbia where they became refugees.

Upon their arrival to Belgrade, Prostran joined the youth team of Serbian giants Red Star Belgrade where he played in an extraordinary generation along players such as Dejan Stanković, Marko Pantelić, Zoran Urumov, Nenad Lalatović, Ivan Gvozdenović, Pavle Delibašić, Ognjen Koroman and coach Toma Milićević. However, less than a year after, in November 1994, he and his family moved to Canada. Immediately after their arrival, Prostran began to play for the youth team of Oakville SC. The club won the youth championship every year until 1998, and won two Ontario Cups, while only losing in the final in the other seasons. In 1998, besides the Ontario Cup, they won the Canadian U-19 championship with Prostran being honored as the MVP of the season and was also the league top-scorer. That same year he won the Srbijada, competition between Serbian clubs in Canada, by playing with the Winona Serbs in Winona. In autumn 1998 he entered McMaster University in Ontario. Prostran played for the university soccer team and became rookie of the year in 1999.

In 1999, he returned to Serbia and played with IM Rakovica, Spartak Ljig (on loan from FK Rad), and FK Beograd. In 2001 joins Remont Čačak and next moved to city rivals Borac Čačak of the Second League of Serbia and Montenegro. The following season, he signed with rivals FK Borac Čačak, where he helped the club clinch its division, and win promotion to the First League of Serbia and Montenegro. On 18 March 2004, the Toronto Lynx of the USL A-League signed him to a contract. He made his debut for the club on 1 May 2004, in a match against Rochester Rhinos. In total he featured in 15 matches for the club. On 30 March 2005, he signed with Oakville Blue Devils of the Canadian Professional Soccer League. During the regular season he helped the club clinch a postseason berth by finishing second in the Western Conference. In the postseason he won the CPSL Championship by defeating the Vaughan Shooters by a score of 2–1. In 2006, he signed with the Hamilton Serbians of the Ontario Soccer League.

In his late stage of his career he helps to establish FK Obilić from Hamilton.

== Coaching career ==
By the time Oakville SC celebrated its 40th birthday, Igor Prostran has already been working for some time coaching the youth levels of the club. On that same ceremony he got awarded as one of the 40 most influential personalities in club history. He has been also selected as coaching instructor in the Ontario Soccer Association and has been assistant in the coaching academy.
