= Jonathan Westmaas =

Football player

Personal information
- Full name: Jonathan Westmaas
- Date of birth: July 3, 1981 (age 45)
- Place of birth: Trinidad and Tobago
- Height: 5 ft 11 in (1.80 m)
- Position: Forward

Youth career
- 2000–2003: Hartwick Hawks

Senior career*
| Years | Team | Apps | (Gls) |
| 2002–2003 | Vaughan Sun Devils | | |
| 2003 | Toronto Lynx | 5 | (0) |
| 2007 | Canadian Lions | 2 | (0) |
| 2010 | York Region Shooters | | |
- * Club domestic league appearances and goals

Jonathan Westmass (born July 3, 1981) is a Trinidadian former footballer who played in the Canadian Professional Soccer League, and the USL A-League.

== Career ==
Before reaching the professional ranks Westmass began playing college soccer with Hartwick College, where he earned First & Second Team All Conference in 2000, and 2001. He began his professional career in 2002 in the Canadian Professional Soccer League with Vaughan Sun Devils. He made his debut on June 7, 2002 in a match against York Region Shooters.

On July 21, 2003 he was signed by the Toronto Lynx of the USL A-League. He made his debut on August 8, 2003 against Vancouver Whitecaps. During his tenure with Toronto he appeared in 5 matches. In 2007, he returned to the CPSL renamed CSL to sign with the Canadian Lions. In 2010, he returned to former club under the name York Region Shooters.
