= Brian Bowes =

Canadian former soccer player

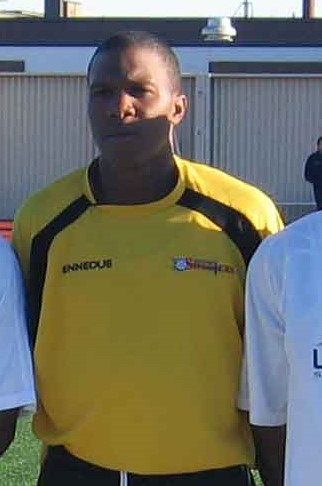
- Bowes in 2005

Personal information
- Date of birth: 1 October 1979 (age 47)
- Place of birth: North York, Ontario, Canada
- Position: Goalkeeper

Senior career*
Years	Team	Apps	(Gls)
1998–2001	Toronto Olympians		
2000–2001	Toronto ThunderHawks (indoor)	6	(1)
2002	Metro Lions		
2001–2003	Kansas City Comets (indoor)	18	(0)
2004–2005	Vaughan Shooters		

International career
1998	Canada U20	3	(0)

Managerial career
- 2011: York Region Shooters
- * Club domestic league appearances and goals

Brian Bowes (born October 1, 1979) is a Canadian former soccer player who played as a goalkeeper and was a head coach.

== Club career ==
=== Youth ===
He represented Team Ontario in the 1997 Canada Games.

=== Early career ===
Bowes played in the southern Ontario-based Canadian Professional Soccer League in 1998 with the newly formed Toronto Olympians. in his debut season with Toronto, he helped the club secure the league double (regular season & league cup). He participated in the CPSL Championship final, where Toronto was defeated by the St. Catharines Roma Wolves. After the conclusion of the 1998 season, he had a trial run with the French side LB Châteauroux. He returned for his sophomore season in 1999. The eastern Toronto side would successfully defend their league cup against Toronto Croatia and secure the regular season title for the second consecutive year. He also played in the championship final, where Toronto successfully secured a league treble after defeating the Croats. Bowes was also nominated for the league's goalkeeper of the year award.

Bowes returned for his third season with Toronto in 2000. He would assist the club in securing their third consecutive league cup by defeating St. Catharines. The regular season title was once more successfully defended for the third consecutive season. He appeared once again in the championship final, where the Olympians lost the match to Toronto Croatia.

Bowes returned for the 2001 season, which marked his final year with the organization. The Olympians would secure a postseason berth but were eliminated in the second round of the playoffs by Toronto Supra. He was also nominated for the league's goalkeeper of the year award and was named to the league all-star team that faced C.S. Marítimo.

=== Indoor career ===
In the winter of 2000–01, he played at the indoor level with the expansion franchise Toronto ThunderHawks of the National Professional Soccer League. He recorded his first professional goal on March 30, 2001, against Kansas City Attack. In total, he played in 6 matches and recorded 1 goal for Toronto.

The following season, Bowes played abroad in the United States-based Major Indoor Soccer League as he was selected by the Kansas City Comets in the dispersal draft after Toronto folded its franchise. He made his debut for Kansas City on November 3, 2001, against the Harrisburg Heat, where he registered a win. As a result of his performance against Harrisburg, he was named the league's defensive player of the week. Though originally signed as a reserve goalkeeper, he was able to start in several matches due to an injury to first-choice goalie Chris Damico. He also assisted the Comets in securing a playoff berth by finishing in third place. In the postseason, Kansas was eliminated in the opening round by Philadelphia KiXX. After the conclusion of the season, he was named to the league's all-rookie team.

Bowes re-signed with Kansas the following season. He initially began the season as the club's starting goalkeeper for the first three opening matches. Shortly after making three appearances, he was released from his contract in late October.

=== Canada ===
After the indoor season, he resumed playing in the CPSL during the summer of 2002 with the expansion side Metro Lions. The Scarborough-based team would secure a playoff berth by finishing third in the Eastern Conference. The team reached the semifinal round of the postseason where they were eliminated from the competition by Ottawa Wizards.

He returned to the league to play the 2004 season with Vaughan Shooters. Bowes would make his fourth championship final appearance during his time with Vaughan where the Shooters lost the match to Toronto Croatia. Vaughan re-signed Bowes for another season in 2005. For the second consecutive season, he helped the club reach the championship final where they were defeated by the Oakville Blue Devils.

In 2006, he played in the Ontario Cup tournament with Scarborough GS United.

== International career ==
Bowes represented the Canada men's national under-20 soccer team at the 1998 CONCACAF U-20 Tournament. He made his debut for the national team on August 5, 1998, against Trinidad and Tobago.

== Managerial career ==
In 2009, he transitioned into the managerial side of soccer and became the head coach for Real Toronto and won the 2009 Ontario Cup. Bowes returned to his former club Vaughan Shooters which was renamed York Region Shooters to coach the team in 2011 in the Canadian Soccer League. In 2012, he joined the coaching staff for Seneca College as an assistant coach under head coach Vito Colangelo. He also returned for the 2013-14 season once more as an assistant coach.
