= Judah Hernandez =

Trinidadian soccer midfielder (born 1986)

Personal information
- Full name: Judah Hernandez
- Date of birth: November 26, 1986 (age 39)
- Place of birth: Port of Spain, Trinidad and Tobago
- Height: 5 ft 5 in (1.65 m)
- Position: Midfielder

Team information
- Current team: Oakville Blue Devils FC
- Number: 8

College career
Years	Team	Apps	(Gls)
2005	FIU	15	(5)
2012	Sheridan	5	(3)

Senior career*
Years	Team	Apps	(Gls)
2004–2005	Ajax Orlando Prospects	30	(3)
2005–2006	Oakville Blue Devils		
2006–2009	Toronto Lynx		
2009	Kent Athletic	2	(3)
2009–2011	Caledonia AIA		
2011	Brampton United		
2013	Burlington SC		
2015–2019	Oakville Blue Devils FC	49+	(7+)

International career^{‡}
2005–2006	Trinidad and Tobago U20	1	(0)
2006–2007	Trinidad and Tobago U21	6	(1)
2007–2008	Trinidad and Tobago U23	3	(1)
2006	Trinidad and Tobago	1	(0)
- * Club domestic league appearances and goals as of 16 September 2018 ‡ National team caps and goals as of 7 November 2014

Judah Hernandez (born November 26, 1986) is a Trinidadian soccer midfielder who currently plays for Canadian club Oakville Blue Devils FC.

== Career ==
Hernandez was born in Trinidad and Tobago and raised in the United States. He has played for Ajax Orlando Prospects, Canadian Soccer League sides Oakville Blue Devils, Toronto Lynx, Brampton United and Burlington SC, as well as playing for Kent Athletic in England, and Caledonia AIA in Trinidad and Tobago. He has also played for the Trinidad and Tobago national football team. He made his first appearance for the senior team on 5 January 2006 in a friendly match against England.
