= Gregory Messam =

Jamaican football defender (born 1973)

Personal information
- Full name: Gregory Messam
- Date of birth: 24 July 1973 (age 53)
- Place of birth: Kingston, Jamaica
- Position: Defender

Senior career*
| Years | Team | Apps | (Gls) |
| 1996 | Colorado Foxes | | |
| 1997–1998 | Harbour View F.C. | | |
| 1998–2000 | Richmond Kickers | 45 | (1) |
| 2001 | Toronto Lynx | 13 | (1) |
| 2001–2004 | Arnett Gardens F.C. | | |
| 2004 | Toronto Lynx | 1 | (0) |
| 2004 | Metro Lions | | |

International career
| 1994–1998 | Jamaica | 55 | (0) |
- * Club domestic league appearances and goals

Gregory Messam (born 24 July 1973) is a Jamaican football defender.

== Playing career ==
Nicknamed 'Skippy', the solid left-back played for local teams Arnett Gardens F.C. and Olympic Gardens F.C., and has played overseas for Richmond Kickers, then of the USA A-League.

During 1996, Messam played for the Colorado Foxes in the A-League, where he played alongside fellow Jamaican internationals Walter Boyd, Wolde Harris, Fabian Davis, and Anthony McCreath under the direction of head coach Lorne Donaldson. In 2001, he went north of the border to sign with the Toronto Lynx, and featured in 13 matches and recorded one goal. After his stint in Toronto he returned to Jamaica to play with Arnett Gardens F.C. After three seasons in Jamaica he returned to the Toronto Lynx in 2004, but was released after making a single appearance. After his release he signed with the Metro Lions of the Canadian Professional Soccer League. During his tenure with the Lions he helped secure a postseason berth by finishing second in the Eastern Conference.

== International career ==
He made his debut as a substitute for the Reggae Boyz in 1995 against Canada and played his last international in 1998 against Trinidad & Tobago, collecting over 30 caps. Messam was a regular starter at left wingback during the early rounds of Jamaica's successful World Cup qualifying effort in 1998. He was left out of Jamaica's 1998 FIFA World Cup squad in favour of Ricardo Gardner, but he was allowed to accompany the team in France.
