= Aaron Benjamin =

Canadian former soccer player

Personal information
- Full name: Aaron Benjamin
- Date of birth: 2 March 1979 (age 47)
- Place of birth: Toronto, Canada
- Height: 1.75 m (5 ft 9 in)
- Position: Forward

Youth career
- 1987–1988: Wexford
- 1989–1990: Scarborough Maple Leaf
- 1991–1996: Scarborough Malvern
- 1996: Northwest Azzurri
- 1997: Chinguacousy Selects

College career
Years	Team	Apps	(Gls)
1997–1999	Maine Black Bears		

Senior career*
Years	Team	Apps	(Gls)
1999–2000	Edmonton Drillers (indoor)	5	(1)
2000–2002	Toronto Lynx	48	(5)
2002	Mississauga Olympians	12	(4)
2003–2004	Metro Lions	16	(1)

International career
1993–1995	Canada U17	2	(0)
- * Club domestic league appearances and goals

Aaron Benjamin (March 2, 1979) is a Canadian former soccer player who played as a forward. Benjamin began his youth soccer in the local Scarborough circuits and later received an athletic scholarship from the University of Maine. Once his college career finished, he transitioned to the professional ranks at the indoor level.

After a season of indoor soccer, he returned to his native city to play for the Toronto Lynx. Following his tenure with Toronto, he finished his career in the Canadian Professional Soccer League. Benjamin also played at the international level, where he represented Canada in the 1995 FIFA U-17 World Championship.

== Youth career ==
While playing with Scarborough Maple Leaf, he appeared in the Scarborough Soccer Association under-11 championship final, where Scarborough Malvern defeated them. In 1995, he won the under-17 Ontario Cup with Scarborough Malvern, where he scored a goal against the Oakville Blue Devils. He also played for the North York Azzurri. In 1997, he played for Chinguacousy Selects, where he participated in the Dallas Cup.

== College career ==
In 1997, he received an athletic scholarship from the University of Maine. In his first season with the men's soccer team, he was named the American East Player of the Week on September 16, 1997. In his final season with the team, he finished as the team's top goal scorer with 8 goals.

== Club career ==
=== Indoor ===
After his college tenure, he received a tryout with the Edmonton Drillers in 2000. A month later, he officially signed a one-year contract with Edmonton to compete in the National Professional Soccer League. In his debut season in the indoor circuit, he helped Edmonton secure a playoff berth by finishing second in their division. In the playoffs, they were eliminated in the conference finals by the Milwaukee Wave. He appeared in five matches and scored one goal. He was part of Edmonton's preseason training camp for the 2000-01 season, but failed to secure a contract.

=== Toronto Lynx ===
In the summer of 2000, he signed with the Toronto Lynx of the USL A-League. He recorded his first goal on June 1, 2000, in a 4–1 victory over the Connecticut Wolves. Benjamin helped Toronto secure a playoff berth by finishing third in their division. In the postseason, they reached the semifinal round where the Rochester Rhinos eliminated them. He also played in a friendly match against Serie A side Reggina. In his first season with Toronto, he recorded five goals.

Toronto re-signed Benjamin for the 2001 season. In his second season, the team failed to qualify for the playoffs. He appeared in 23 games that season. He made his final regular season appearance for Toronto on May 4, 2002, against the Charlotte Eagles. His final Toronto appearance was in a friendly match against Bundesliga side TSV 1860 Munich on May 18, 2002.

=== Ontario ===
After his release from Toronto, he signed with the Mississauga Olympians of the Canadian Professional Soccer League. He debuted on May 24, 2002, against the York Region Shooters. Benjamin scored his first two goals for Mississauga on June 7, 2002, against Toronto Supra. He helped the Olympians secure a postseason berth by finishing second in the league's western conference. Their playoff run ended in the opening round after the North York Astros defeated them.

In 2003, Benjamin signed with the division rivals Metro Lions. He re-signed with the Lions for the 2004 season. In his second season with the Lions, he helped the club secure a playoff berth by finishing second in their division. In the quarterfinals, the Vaughan Shooters eliminated them.

== International career ==
Benjamin was selected to represent the Canada men's national under-17 soccer team in the 1995 FIFA U-17 World Championship. He debuted for Canada on August 4, 1995, against Oman.
