= Marco Reda =

Canadian soccer player (born 1977)

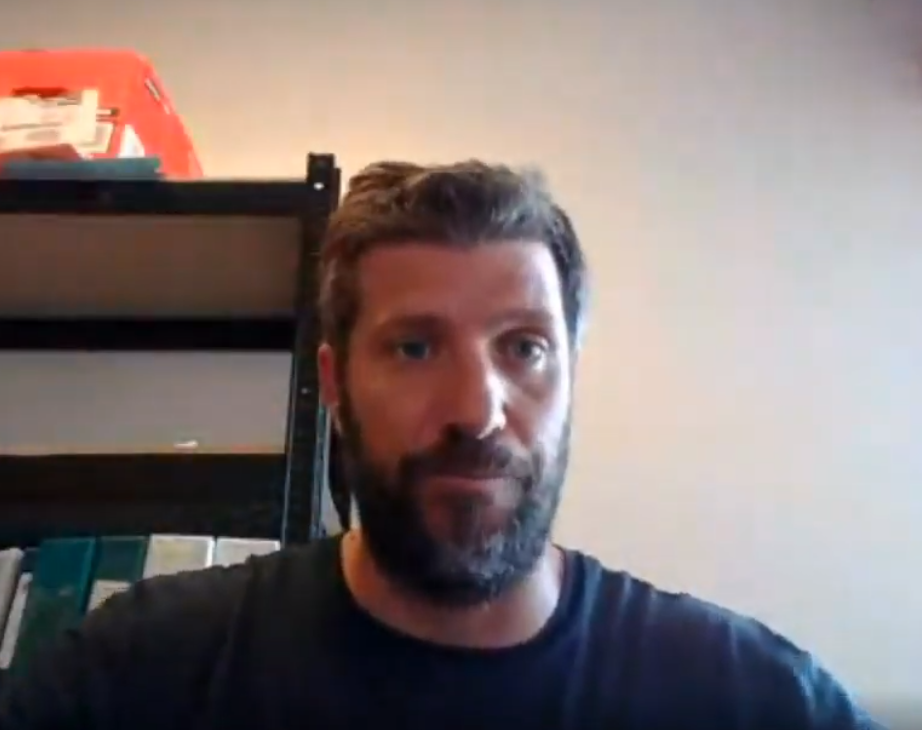
- Reda in June 2020

Personal information
- Full name: Marco Reda
- Date of birth: June 22, 1977 (age 49)
- Place of birth: Woodbridge, Ontario, Canada
- Height: 6 ft 2 in (1.88 m)
- Position: Defender

College career
Years	Team	Apps	(Gls)
1996–1998	Winthrop Eagles		

Senior career*
Years	Team	Apps	(Gls)
1998–2002	Toronto Lynx	82	(0)
2000–2001	Toronto ThunderHawks (indoor)	6	(0)
2002–2004	Sogndal	49	(6)
2004–2005	Aalborg	21	(0)
2006	Sogndal	20	(1)
2007	Toronto FC	8	(0)
2008	Charleston Battery	27	(1)
2009	Vancouver Whitecaps	16	(2)

International career^{‡}
1999–2000	Canada U23	6	(0)
2005–2008	Canada	7	(1)

Managerial career
- 2012: SC Toronto (ass't)
- 2012: SC Toronto II
- * Club domestic league appearances and goals as of 21 October 2009 ‡ National team caps and goals as of 24 December 2009

Marco Reda (born June 22, 1977) is a Canadian former soccer player who began his professional career in the USL A-League with the Toronto Lynx where he developed his skills as a solid defender. This led to his transfer to Europe to sign with Sogndal, where he would eventually have a tenure in Scandinavia for six years. Reda would return to Toronto, this time to sign with expansion franchise Toronto FC, and would conclude his career in the USL First Division. He also played at the indoor level in the National Professional Soccer League with the Toronto ThunderHawks in 2000–2001.

After his retirement from competitive soccer he briefly served as an assistant coach in the Canadian Soccer League with SC Toronto in 2012, and later became a teacher for Hudson College.

== Club career ==
Reda began his career at the college level with Winthrop University from 1996 to 1997. He went professional in 1998, after Peter Pinizzotto head coach of the Toronto Lynx signed him to a contract. In 1999, he was named the team captain for the club, and won the team's best defensive player award. In 2000, the captain assisted his franchise in qualifying for the postseason for the second time in the club's history. Toronto would finish third in the Northeast Division. In the playoffs the Lynx faced Richmond Kickers in the first round, and advanced to the next round by a 3-1 goals on aggregate.

In the next round Toronto would face the Rochester Rhinos, but would be eliminated from the playoffs by a score of 2–1 on goals on aggregate. Reda had a stint in the National Professional Soccer League with the short lived expansion franchise the Toronto ThunderHawks during the 2000-2001 winter indoor season. He helped the ThunderHawks reach the postseason by finishing second in the National Conference, and reached the Conference finals where they were defeated by the Milwaukee Wave. His next notable season with Toronto was in the 2002 season where he would continue in his capacity as club captain. On June 13, 2002, he was named for the first time in his career to the A-League Team of the Week. Early on in the season he was invited to a trial in Norway with Sogndal Fotball. His trial was a success and was offered a contract by the First Division club.

In his debut season with Sogndal he was named the club's player of the year, and played a total of 70 matches and scored six goals. In 2006. after Sogndal were relegated to Norwegian First Division he signed a contract with Aalborg BK of the Danish Superliga. Reda played for Aalborg for a year and a half before being released. In 2006, he re-signed with his old team Sogndal to help them win back promotion to the top flight. On February 22, 2007, the newly formed Toronto FC of the Major League Soccer signed Reda to a contract. At Toronto he, along with Chris Pozniak, Adam Braz and Jim Brennan were touted to form a 'Canadian Shield' of Canadian defenders for the MLS team's inaugural season, but a combination of injuries and inconsistent play led to only Brennan remaining with the team for its second year. Reda was released by Toronto in November 2007.

On March 4, 2008, he signed with the Charleston Battery of the USL First Division. With Charleston he was named the team captain, and helped the Battery reach the Lamar Hunt U.S. Open Cup final, where the organization lost to a score of 2–1 to D.C. United. On February 11, 2009, he signed with the Vancouver Whitecaps, During his tenure with Vancouver he helped the Whitecaps reach the USL playoff finals, but were defeated by the Montreal Impact. He was released by the Whitecaps at the end of the 2009 season.

== Coaching career ==
Since 2010 Marco has been coaching with the Power Soccer School of Excellence in Toronto, Ontario.

On May 1, 2012, he was appointed assistant coach to SC Toronto in the Canadian Soccer League. He helped Toronto finish third in the first division which clinched a postseason berth for the club. The senior team would be eliminated in the quarterfinal round by the Serbian White Eagles. He also served as the head coach for SC Toronto's reserve squad in the league's second division. Reda led the reserve side to the championship final where Toronto defeated Brampton City United II for the title.

He is currently the technical director for Woodbridge Soccer Club.

== International career ==
Reda made his debut for Canada in a February 2005 friendly match against Northern Ireland and has earned a total of 7 caps, scoring 1 goal. He has a non-playing squad member at the 2007 CONCACAF Gold Cup. His final international was a January 2008 friendly match against Martinique. He also played with the Canada men's national under-23 soccer team where he was selected for the 1999 Pan American Games.

== Hudson College ==
Since 2014, Marco Reda has taught physical education at and been the overall gym teacher of the Toronto private school, Hudson College.

=== International goals ===
Scores and results list Canada's goal tally first.

#	Date	Venue	Opponent	Score	Result	Competition
1	1 March 2006	Ernst Happel Stadium, Vienna, Austria	Austria	2-0	2-0	Friendly match

== Footnotes ==
1. "MLS Waiver Draft set for Thursday". toronto.fc.mlsnet.com. Archived from the original on 2007-12-14.
