= Darren Baxter (English footballer) =

English footballer

Personal information
- Date of birth: 26 October 1981 (age 45)
- Place of birth: Brighton, England
- Positions: Left back; midfielder

Youth career
- 1998–2001: Chelsea

Senior career*
Years	Team	Apps	(Gls)
2001	Heart of Midlothian	0	(0)
2001–2002	Worthing		
2001	→ St Albans City (loan)	1	(0)
2002–?	St Albans City	5	(0)
2003	New York Freedom	14	(0)
2004	Toronto Lynx	24	(4)
2005	Oakville Blue Devils	5	(0)
2006	Toronto Lynx	8	(0)
2007	Torquay United	1	(0)
- * Club domestic league appearances and goals as of 12 April 2018

Darren Baxter (born 26 October 1981) is an English former professional footballer.

== Playing career ==
Baxter was born in Brighton and began his football career as a trainee with Chelsea. He left Chelsea in the 2000–2001 season at the end of his three-year traineeship. On leaving Chelsea he joined Heart of Midlothian, but having missed the transfer deadline was restricted to playing for their reserve side.

He joined Worthing in the summer of 2001, but moved to St Albans City in March 2002, having played one match on loan for them in October 2001. In 2003, he played abroad in the USL Pro Select League with New York Freedom.

In 2004, he joined USL A-League side Toronto Lynx, making his debut for the club on 1 May 2004 in a match against the Rochester Rhinos in a 4–0 defeat. In his first season with the Lynx, Baxter recorded 4 goals and 2 assists, which ranked him third in scoring for the Lynx in his rookie season. When the season came to a conclusion he was awarded team's Best Offensive Player award. In 2005, Baxter was acquired by the Oakville Blue Devils in the Canadian Professional Soccer League after Duncan Wilde was appointed the new head coach. He made his debut for the club on 5 June 2005 in a 2–1 victory over the Vaughan Shooters. He helped Oakville finish second in the western conference allowing the club to clinch a playoff berth, which ultimately resulted in the club claiming the CPSL Championship.

On 18 April 2006 Baxter re-signing with the Lynx was announced in a press conference which revealed the 2006 team roster. He appeared in eight matches for the club in the 2006 season.

On 9 January 2007, he returned to England, joining Torquay United, making his debut as a half-time substitute for Chris McPhee in the 5–0 defeat away to Mansfield Town on 30 January 2007. However, this was to be his only appearance for Torquay, as along with Nathan Simpson, he left on 6 February 2007, having learnt that his initial one-month contract was not going to be renewed.

In October 2007, Baxter joined Dorchester Town on trial, scoring in a reserve game against Torquay United's reserve team.
