= Ajax Orlando Prospects =

Coordinates: 28°31′08″N 81°25′11″W

- Full name: Ajax Orlando Prospects
- Nickname: The Prospects
- Founded: 2002; 23 years ago
- Dissolved: 2007; 18 years ago
- Stadium: Warden Stadium
- Capacity: 2,500
- Chairman: (United States) Mark Dillon
- Manager: (United States) Mark Dillon
- League: USL Premier Development League
- 2006: 5th, Mid South Division
Home colours	Away colours

Ajax Orlando Prospects was an American soccer club based in Orlando, Florida. Founded in 2002. the team was a member of the United Soccer Leagues Premier Development League (PDL), the fourth tier of the American Soccer Pyramid, until 2006, when the team left the league and the franchise was terminated.

The Prospects played their home games at Warden Stadium on the grounds of The First Academy, a Christian college preparatory school in Orlando, Florida. The team's colors were white, red and black.

The team was part of the Ajax America organisation, an exclusive affiliate of the renowned Dutch football club AFC Ajax’s North American marketing and player development program.

== Final squad ==
vs Palm Beach Pumas, 22 July 2006 Note: Flags indicate national team as defined under FIFA eligibility rules; some limited exceptions apply. Players may hold more than one non-FIFA nationality.

No.	Pos.	Nation	Player
1	GK	USA	Devala Gorrick
2	FW	USA	Berin Boracic
4	DF	USA	Diego Cordeiro
5	MF	USA	Noah Herbert
6	DF	USA	Mark Wong
7	MF	USA	Jeffrey Sefton
8	MF	USA	Raffi Ferreira
10	MF	TRI	Judah Hernandez

No.	Pos.	Nation	Player
11	DF	ENG	Nicolas Rasek
13	DF	USA	Robert Rivers
14	FW	ENG	Aldis Aldrych
15	MF	USA	Eric Loyd
16	FW	USA	Michael Williams
17	DF	USA	Set Carpintero
22	MF	USA	Carlos Mora
27	DF	USA	David Mackey

== Year-by-year ==
Year	Division	League	Regular season	Playoffs	Open Cup
2004	4	USL PDL	3rd, Southeast	Did not qualify	Did not qualify
2005	4	USL PDL	5th, Southeast	Did not qualify	Did not qualify
2006	4	USL PDL	5th, Southeast	Did not qualify	Did not qualify

== Coaches and staff ==
- (United States) Greg Petersen (2004–2005)
- (United States) Mark Dillon (2005–2006)

Technical Director

- (Netherlands) Barry Hulshoff (2004–2006)

== Stadia ==
- Stadium at Dr. Phillips High School, Orlando, Florida 2004
- Disney's Wide World of Sports Complex, Kissimmee, Florida 2004–05 (2 games)
- Austin Tindell Sports Complex, Orlando, Florida 2004 (1 game)
- Stadium at Lakeland Christian Academy, Lakeland, Florida 2005
- Bryant Stadium, Lakeland, Florida 2005 (1 game)
- Warden Stadium, Orlando, Florida 2006

== Average attendance ==
- 2006: 60
- 2005: 89
