= Goran Miscevic =

Canadian association football manager

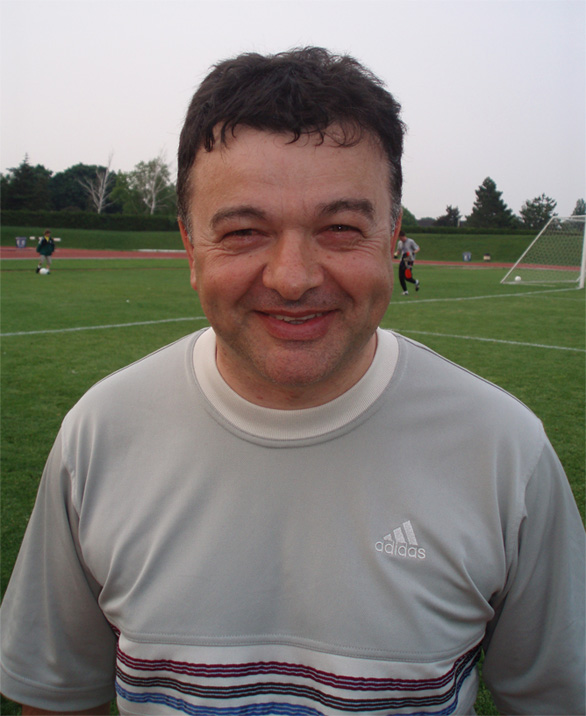
- Miscevic in 2007

Personal information
- Date of birth: 26 March 1963 (age 63)
- Place of birth: Virovitica, SR Croatia, SFR Yugoslavia

Managerial career
- Years: Team
- 1995–1997: VfR Pforzheim
- 2000–2002: Ontario U19
- 2003–2004: Metro Lions
- 2007: Canadian Lions
- 2008–2009: Al-Wakrah
- 2010–2011: Al-Hazm
- 2011–2012: Salalah
- 2012–2013: Al Urooba
- 2013: Al-Ittihad Kalba
- 2014–2016: Al-Arabi
- 2017: Zhenjiang Huasa
- 2018: Yunnan Kunlu
- 2019–2020: Al-Seeb
- 2020–2022: Rot-Weiß Erfurt
- 2022–2023: Rot-Weiß Erfurt (sporting director)
- 2026: AFC Câmpulung Muscel

Goran Miscevic (pronounced [ɡǒran mǐʃtʃeʋitɕ]; born 26 March 1963) is a Serbian-Canadian soccer manager and former player. He most recently served as both manager and sporting director of German club Rot-Weiß Erfurt.

== Career ==
Miscevic was born in Virovitica, SR Croatia, SFR Yugoslavia, to a Serbian family. He played professionally in Yugoslavia and Germany. After his retirement from competitive soccer, he obtained a coaching license from the German Football Association. Miscevic managed VfR Pforzheim in Germany for two years. In 1997, he immigrated to Canada and in 2000 served as an assistant coach for Glen Shields of the Canadian Professional Soccer League. In 2003, he was appointed the head coach for the Metro Lions, and in the 2004 season, he led the team to a second-place position in the Eastern Conference.

He returned to the Lions in 2007 (this time under the name Canadian Lions) with his assistant being former Yugoslavia international Blagoje Bratić. His tenure with the club was notable as he promoted Dejan Jakovic to the first team and secured the team a postseason berth by finishing fourth in the International Division. In 2008, he went overseas to coach Al-Wakrah Sport Club in the Qatar Stars League. In 2010, he went to Saudi Arabia to coach Al-Hazm F.C. of the Saudi Professional League. In 2011, he went to Oman to coach Salalah SC of the Oman Professional League. In 2012, he moved to the United Arab Emirates and had stints with Al Urooba and was unbeaten for 12 games in a row, which was a league record he lost only 3 games in the season, Al-Ittihad Kalba SC, and Al-Arabi.

In 2017, he moved to China to coach Zhenjiang Huasa/Kunshan FC. In 2018, he moved to another Chinese club, Yunnan Kunlu, and led them to a win that year as well as a 10th-place finish in the 2018 Chinese Champions League, enough for gaining promotion to China League Two. In 2019, he went back to the Middle East and signed with the top division team Al-Seeb Club of the Oman Professional League. In the season 2019–20, he won the Oman Professional League Championship. In 2020, he was named the head coach for Rot-Weiß Erfurt in the NOFV-Oberliga Süd, gaining promotion to the Regional League North East. In the summer of 2025, he left Rot-Weiss Erfurt.

In 2026, he was named manager for Câmpulung Muscel in the Romanian Liga II. After three months with Câmpulung Muscel, he was dismissed from his position.
