= Cameron Medwin =

Canadian soccer player (born 1982)

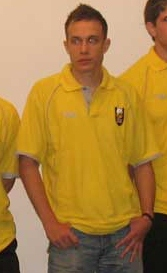
- Medwin in 2007

Personal information
- Full name: Cameron Medwin
- Date of birth: March 19, 1982 (age 44)
- Place of birth: Toronto, Ontario, Canada
- Height: 5 ft 11 in (1.80 m)
- Positions: Midfielder; defender

Youth career
- –1998: Humber College

Senior career*
Years	Team	Apps	(Gls)
1999–2001	London City	40	(3)
2002	York Region Shooters	19	(1)
2003–2005	Vaughan Shooters	57	(9)
2006–2009	Toronto Lynx	31	(1)
2009–2011	Brampton United		
2017–	Portugal AC (indoor)		
- * Club domestic league appearances and goals

Cameron Medwin (born March 19, 1982, in Toronto, Ontario, Canada) is a Canadian former soccer who played as a defender.

== Playing career ==
Cameron began playing amateur soccer with local clubs such as Vaughan Rockets, and Wexford Warriors where he won the Ontario Cup. In March 1999 – when he turned 16 – he began his soccer career with London City in the Canadian Professional Soccer League. He made his debut on May 28, 1999, against the North York Astros where he scored his first goal. Cameron continued playing with London until he began college soccer with Humber College in 2001. After finishing his college soccer season he signed an amateur contract with York Region Shooters making him eligible to come back to play college soccer. He made his debut with the club on May 24, 2002, but failed to secure a postseason berth.

At the end of the season the York Region Shooters merged with Glen Shields Sun Devils and became the Vaughan Shooters. This time with the Shooters he helped the team reach the Rogers Cup finals but lost 1–0 to the Brampton Stallions. He returned to play college soccer with Humber, where he was named captain and as well the team MVP. With Vaughan he again helped them reach the finals but lost to Toronto Croatia 4-0. In 2005 for the third straight year the Shooters reached the CPSL Championship finals, but again lost to Oakville Blue Devils to a score of 2–1.

On April 18, 2006, he signed with the Toronto Lynx of the USL First Division. He made his Lynx debut on April 22, 2006, in 2–0 loss to the Virginia Beach Mariners. He helped Toronto to a 10-game undefeated streak at home a franchise record, and helped reach the finals of the Open Canada Cup, but lost to a score of 2–0 to Ottawa St. Anthony Italia. Once the season came to a conclusion the Lynx franchise dropped two divisions down to the USL Premier Development League resulting in many players to be released from their contracts. He remained with Toronto and renewed his contract. He played in a Toronto FC reserve match as a guest player on September 30, 2007. In the 2008 season he helped Toronto clinch a postseason berth for the first time since the 2000 season.

On May 14, 2009, Brampton United announced the signing of Medwin for the 2009 season. During his tenure with Brampton he helped the club reach the playoffs for the 2009, and 2011 seasons. In 2017, he played indoor soccer with Portugal AC in the Arena Premier League.

== Personal life ==
He is the grandson of the Welsh international footballer Terry Medwin.
