= Sergio De Luca =

Canadian association football player

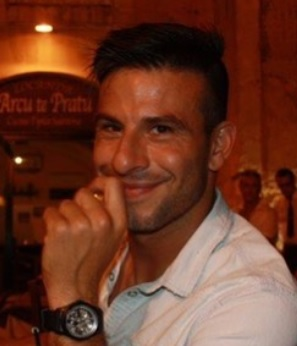
- De Luca in 2018

Personal information
- Date of birth: September 8, 1982 (age 44)
- Place of birth: Toronto, Canada
- Height: 1.78 m (5 ft 10 in)
- Position: Midfielder

Youth career
- 1996–1998: Woodbridge Strikers
- 1998–1999: Prato
- 1999–2000: Telford United
- 2000–2001: Hereford United

Senior career*
| Years | Team | Apps | (Gls) |
| 2002 | Toronto Lynx | 1 | (1) |
| 2003 | Hamilton Thunder | 17 | (6) |
| 2003 | Pécs | 14 | (7) |
| 2004 | Arendal | 8 | (3) |
| 2005 | Oakville Blue Devils | 40 | (3) |
| 2006–2007 | Torgelower SV Greif | 9 | (1) |
| 2007–2009 | Toronto Lynx | 17 | (6) |
| 2009 | North York Astros | 7 | (0) |
| 2010–2012 | SC Toronto | 31 | (4) |
| Total | | 110 | (12) |

Managerial career
- Vaughan Azzurri (academy)
- 2018–2020: York9 (assistant)
- 2023–: Vaughan Azzurri (assistant)
- * Club domestic league appearances and goals as of April 26, 2019

Sergio De Luca (born September 8, 1982) is a Canadian professional soccer coach and former player.

De Luca began his career abroad in Europe, before returning to North America where he had several stints in the USL A-League, Canadian Professional Soccer League and USL Premier Development League. He would later return to Europe to have stints in Hungary, Norway, and Germany before concluding his career primarily in the Canadian Soccer League.

== Playing career ==
=== Early career ===
De Luca began playing soccer at the youth level with Woodbridge Soccer Club in the year 1996. The following year he went abroad and signed with Italy club A.C. Prato where he featured in youth matches. The following year he went across the English channel to play with Telford United F.C., becoming the first foreign player to play for the club. He was appointed youth team captain and had a successful season there scoring 13 goals out of 20 games at the youth level. In 2000, De Luca was transferred to Hereford United, where once again in his first season with the club he was named team captain. He had another effective season with Hereford where he continued his fine scoring rate with 97 goals out of 18 matches in the youth level.

=== Toronto Lynx ===
On July 10, 2002 the Toronto Lynx of the USL A-League signed him to a contract, and made his professional debut against the Rochester Rhinos on July 14, 2002.

=== Hamilton Thunder ===
After failing to establish himself with the Lynx he signed with the Hamilton Thunder of the Canadian Professional Soccer League. He was appointed team captain and helped the Thunder win the Western Conference title. In the postseason he led the Thunder to the semi-finals before losing out to Vaughan Shooters.

=== Oakville Blue Devils ===
After a successful season in Hamilton, De Luca played one season in Hungary with Pécsi Mecsek FC, and the following season with FK Arendal in the 2. divisjon. De Luca returned to the CPSL for the 2005 season where he signed with expansion franchise Oakville Blue Devils . There he experienced a tremendous season where he played a significant role in winning the CPSL Championship. On September 11, 2005 he recorded his first two goals for Oakville in a 2-0 victory over St. Catharines Wolves. During the club's playoff run he contributed by scoring the third and winning goal in the 90' minute in the Western Conference semi-final match against the Windsor Border Stars. In the Western Conference final match against his former club Hamilton he produced an assist in a 2-0 victory which advanced the Blue Devils to the finals. In the final match against Vaughan he scored the equalizing goal to tie the game 1-1 in the 46' minute after a goal down, which sent the match into overtime where Ryan Gamble scored the golden goal to win the championship, making the Oakville the first expansion franchise to win the CPSL Championship in their debut season.

=== Toronto Lynx ===
Following his success with Oakville he returned to Europe to play for Torgelower SV Greif in the NOFV-Oberliga Nord, after not featuring much in Germany due to sustaining a sports hernia injury received early on in the season he returned to the Toronto Lynx in 2007. The Lynx finished the season with a 6-6-4 record, which placed the team in fourth place in the Great Lakes Division, and missed a playoff berth by six points. During the season he landed in Sweden with FC Hollviken signing a 2-year deal. However, after the first season, De Luca decided to terminate his contract. In 2008, he returned to Toronto and assisted the club by reaching the playoffs for the first time since the 2000 season. Where they were defeated by the Cleveland Internationals by a score of 2-1.

In the 2009 PDL season he recorded his first goal in Lynx uniform on June 6, 2009, in a match against Cincinnati Kings. He would record his second goal on June 27, 2009 against the Indiana Invaders. Unfortunately, the Lynx failed to reach the playoffs, and finished lasted in the Great Lakes Division.

=== North York Astros ===
De Luca was among the new additional signings done by North York Astros head coach Vladimir Klinovsky midway through the 2009 CSL season; in order to strengthen his squad for the battle over the final playoff berth. Though the Astros did overwhelmingly improve under Klinovsky leadership it was not enough to secure the final playoff spot. In total De Luca appeared in seven matches.

=== SC Toronto ===
The following season, he was transferred to Portugal FC, where head coach Carmine Isacco selected him the team captain. He made his debut for the club on May 8, 2010 in a match against TFC Academy. His biggest achievement with the club was finishing as regular season champions in the 2011 season.

== Coaching career ==
After spending time coaching in Vaughan SC's development programme, De Luca joined Canadian Premier League side York 9 FC as an assistant coach in July 2018.

== Honours ==
Hamilton Thunder

- CPSL Western Conference: 2003

Oakville Blue Devils

- CPSL Championship: 2005

SC Toronto

- Canadian Soccer League Regular Season: 2011
