= Nikola Vignjević =

Serbian footballer (born 1971)

Personal information
- Date of birth: March 12, 1971 (age 55)
- Place of birth: Belgrade, SFR Yugoslavia
- Position: Midfielder

Team information
- Current team: Alberta Golden Bears (technical coach)

Senior career*
Years	Team	Apps	(Gls)
- Čukarički
1995	San Jose Grizzlies (indoor)	13	(9)
1996–1998	Cleveland Crunch (indoor)	57	(63)
1997	Rochester Rhinos	21	(3)
1998–2000	Toronto Lynx	76	(22)
1998–2000	Edmonton Drillers (indoor)	85	(103)
1999	Richmond Kickers	3	(0)
2000–2001	Cleveland Crunch (indoor)	32	(34)
2002–2003	Toronto Lynx	54	(6)
2002–2003	Kansas City Comets (indoor)	14	(3)
2003	Harrisburg Heat (indoor)	10	(5)
2003	Metro Lions		
2003–2004	Philadelphia KiXX (indoor)	17	(1)
2004	Edmonton Aviators	24	(3)
2008–2009	Edmonton Drillers	4	(2)

International career
- Serbia Futsal

Managerial career
- 2009–: Alberta Golden Bears (technical coach)
- * Club domestic league appearances and goals

Nikola Vignjević (Serbian Cyrillic: Никола Вигњевић; born March 12, 1971) is a former Serbian football player, who currently works as Technical coach by Alberta Golden Bears and the Greater St.Albert Sports Academy. While playing for the Lynx, he was commonly referred to as Niki and Nikki.

== Career ==
Vignjević began his career with FK Čukarički of the Second League of Serbia and Montenegro. In 1995, he went overseas to the United States to play indoor soccer with San Jose Grizzlies of the Continental Indoor Soccer League. The following season he signed with the Cleveland Crunch of the National Professional Soccer League where he amassed 58 goals and 35 assists as a rookie to help clinch the championship. In 1997, he returned to outdoor soccer with play with the Rochester Raging Rhinos of the USL A-League. In 1998, he went north of the border to Canada to sign with division rivals the Toronto Lynx. In his debut season he received the club's Best Offensive Player award.

He briefly featured with the Richmond Kickers before being traded back to Toronto in 1999. During his first stint with Toronto he received several achievements as the club's MVP, twice named A-League Player of the Week and named to the A-League Team of the Week four times. In 2000, he helped the club clinch a postseason berth, and contributed a goal in a 1-0 victory over Richmond in the first round of the playoffs.

In 1998, he continued playing indoor soccer this time with the Edmonton Drillers, where he played for the club for three seasons and finished as the club's all-time goalscorer with 103 goals. In late 2000, he was traded midway back to Cleveland. He returned to Toronto for the 2002 season. He would conclude his career in Toronto in 2003 where he finished as the club's all-time points leader including both goals and assists. At the conclusion of the 2003 season he signed with the Metro Lions of the Canadian Professional Soccer League. He made his debut for the club on September 3, 2003 in a match against Brampton Hitmen. He helped improve the club's performance on the pitch, but unfortunately the team fell short in clinching a postseason berth.

In 2002, he returned to indoor soccer to play with the Kansas City Comets and Harrisburg Heat of the Major Indoor Soccer League. In 2004, he returned to Alberta to sign with expansion franchise the Edmonton Aviators where he scored 3 goals and recorded 2 assists. At the end of the season he announced his retirement. He was listed on the 2008-09 roster of the Edmonton Drillers indoor team.

== Coaching career ==
After his retirement 2009 was named as the Technical coach of the Alberta Golden Bears. He also coaches for the Edmonton Warriors Youth Soccer Club.

His brother Nebojša (former team-mate with the Lynx) is a coach.

== Honors ==
Cleveland Crunch

- NPSL Championship: 1995-1996
- NPSL Central Division: 1996-1997

Edmonton Drillers

- NPSL National Conference: 1998-1999
