= Orlin Chalmers =

Canadian soccer player

Personal information
- Full name: Orlin Chalmers
- Date of birth: January 30, 1982 (age 44)
- Height: 1.78 m (5 ft 10 in)
- Position: Defender

Senior career*
| Years | Team | Apps | (Gls) |
| 2002–2003 | Hamilton Thunder | 20 | (0) |
| 2002 | → Calgary Storm (loan) | 6 | (0) |
| 2003–2005 | Toronto Croatia | 21 | (2) |
| 2006–2009 | Oakville Blue Devils/Brampton Lions | | |

Managerial career
- 2023: Brandon Bobcats (women)
- * Club domestic league appearances and goals

Orlin Chalmers (born January 30, 1982) is a former Canadian soccer player who played as a defender and is the former the head coach for the Brandon Bobcats women's team.

== Playing career ==
Chalmers began his professional career at the youth level overseas in France with FC Cannes, after returning to Canada to play with the Hamilton Thunder of the Canadian Professional Soccer League in 2002. After an impressive start to the season he was loaned out along with three other players to the Calgary Storm of the USL A-League. After appearing in six matches with the Storm he was called back to Hamilton on July 21, 2002. On August 27, 2003, he was traded to Toronto Croatia for Peter Curic and Josip Bucic. He made his debut for Croatia on September 5, 2003, in a match against the Mississauga Olympians in a 3–0 victory.

He helped Toronto finish third in the Western Conference allowing the club to clinch a postseason berth. In the quarterfinals match Chalmers scored the lone goal for Croatia against the Brampton Hitmen in a 1–1 draw, and scored a successful goal in the penalty shootout which Croatia won. The victory was short lived due to Croatia fielding an illegal player which eliminated the club from playoff contention. The following season he helped the Toronto side reach the postseason by finishing as runners up in the Western Conference. In 2006, he signed with the Oakville Blue Devils and helped Oakville claim the National Division title. He played the remainder of his career with the club, which was renamed Brampton Lions in 2007, assisting the club by reaching the playoffs in all of his years of service with the club.

== Managerial career ==
In 2023, he became the technical director for the Westman Regional Soccer Association and was the former head coach for the Brandon University women's program for a partial duration of the 2023/2024 season. He resigned from his position as head coach in November 2023. In 2024, he returned to the Westman Regional Soccer Association as the technical director.

== Honors ==
Oakville Blue Devils

- Canadian Soccer League National Division Champions: 2006
