= Srbijada =

Serbian North American soccer tournament

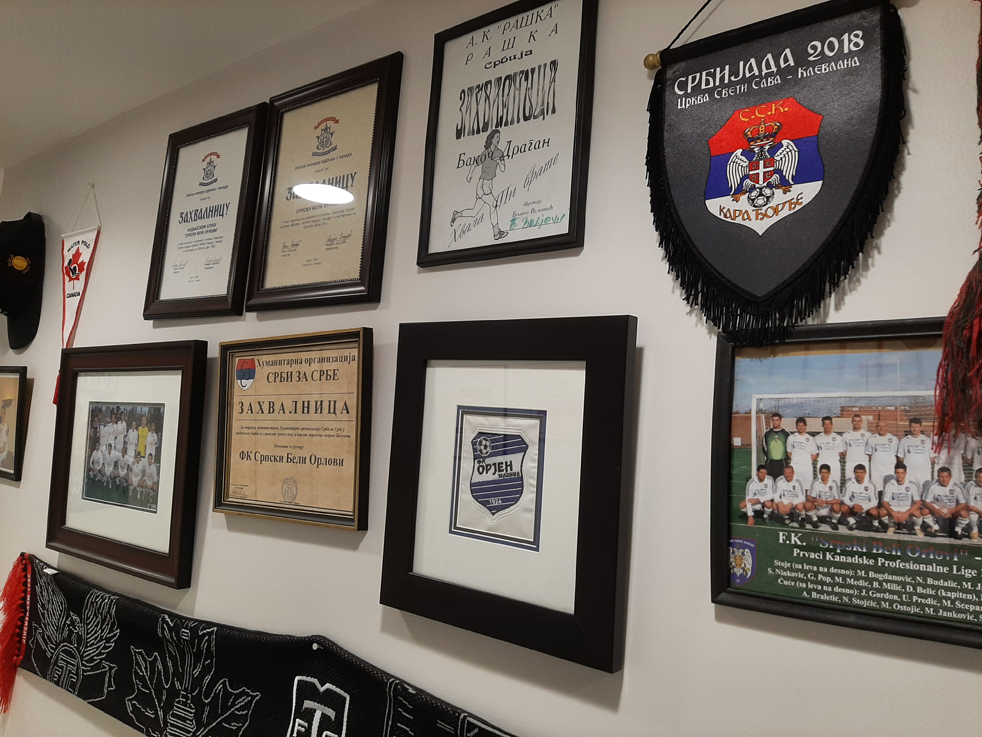
A Srbijada plaque (top right) from the 2018 edition of the tournament

Srbijada is the common name for the Annual Serbian North American Soccer Tournament. The tournament is held every year in North America during Labor Day weekend.

== The Tournament ==
Every year, the tournament is held in a new city and has a new host club. By 2011, 19 consecutive tournaments were held. In 2012 the 20th tournament was held in Paterson, New Jersey on August 31 through September 3. The first Srbijada was held in 1993. The tournament took place in Windsor, Ontario; and the hosting club was Windsor Serbs.

During Srbijada, four competitions are held. Tournaments are held in open, over 30 and over 40 categories, and the latest addition was the over 50 division. Both open and over 30 categories have been in existence since the beginning of the tournament, while over 40 category was added to the tournament program in 1998.

This tournament is very similar to the Karadjordje Cup which takes place in Australia.

== Purpose of the tournament ==
- To establish a traditional annual sporting event for Serbs in North America
- To promote the game of soccer among Serbian athletes
- To bring Serbian people from different Serbian communities together
- To enhance and promote the Serbian name across North America
- To financially help the hosting team
- To expand the athletic competition to other disciplines

== Past tournaments ==
Year	Host country	Host city	Host club
1993	Canada	Windsor, Ontario	Windsor Serbs
1994	United States	Milwaukee, Wisconsin	United Serbians – PABST
1995	United States	Cleveland, Ohio	Karadjordje Cleveland
1996	United States	Chicago, Illinois	United Serbs S.B.H.
1997	United States	Mesa, Arizona	Arizona Serbs
1998	Canada	Hamilton, Ontario	Winona Serbs
1999	United States	Chicago, Illinois	United Serbs S.B.H.
2000	United States	Milwaukee, Wisconsin	United Serbians – PABST
2001	United States	Paterson, New Jersey	White Eagles, Paterson
2002	Canada	Windsor, Ontario	Windsor Serbs
2003	United States	Cleveland, Ohio	Karadjordje Cleveland
2004	United States	Milwaukee, Wisconsin	United Serbians – PABST
2005	Canada	Niagara Falls, Ontario	Srbija Niagara Falls
2006	United States	St. Petersburg, Florida	United Serbs
2007	Canada	Vancouver, British Columbia	White Eagles
2008	Canada	Hamilton, Ontario	Hamilton Serbians
2009	United States	Cleveland, Ohio	Karadjordje Cleveland
2010	United States	Phoenix, Arizona	United Serbs
2011	United States	Chicago, Illinois	F.K. Morava S.B.H.
2012	United States	Paterson, New Jersey	White Eagles, Paterson
2013	United States	Akron, Ohio	Gavrilo Princip
2014	United States	Milwaukee, Wisconsin	United Serbians
2015	Canada	Vancouver, British Columbia	White Eagles
2016	United States	Orlando, Florida	FK Pingvini
2017	United States	Chicago, Illinois	United Serbs - S.B.H
2018	United States	Cleveland, Ohio	Karadjordje
2019	United States	Chicago, Illinois	FK Republika Srpska
2021	United States	Parsippany, New Jersey	United Serbs East Coast
2022	United States	Akron, Ohio	Gavrilo Princip
2023	United States	Chicago, Illinois	F.K Morava
2024	United States	Milwaukee, Wisconsin	United Serbians

== Open division winners ==
Year	Host country	Host city	Host club	Winner	Finalist
1993	Canada	Windsor, Ontario	Windsor Serbs	Delije, Los Angeles	United Serbians - PABST, Milwaukee
1994	USA	Milwaukee, Wisconsin	United Serbians – PABST	United Serbians - PABST, Milwaukee	Delije, Los Angeles
1995	USA	Cleveland, Ohio	Karadjordje, Cleveland	Karadjordje, Cleveland	White Eagles, Vancouver
1996	USA	Chicago, Illinois	United Serbs S.B.H.	United Serbs S.B.H., Chicago	Hamilton Serbians, Hamilton
1997	USA	Mesa, Arizona	Arizona Serbs	United Serbs S.B.H., Chicago	United Serbians PABST, Milwaukee
1998	Canada	Hamilton, Ontario	Winona Serbs	Winona Serbs, Hamilton	Hamilton Serbians, Hamilton
1999	USA	Chicago, Illinois	United Serbs S.B.H.	White Eagles, Paterson, NJ	United Serbs S.B.H., Chicago
2000	USA	Milwaukee, Wisconsin	United Serbians – PABST	United Serbs S.B.H., Chicago	FK Obilic, New York
2001	USA	Paterson, New Jersey	White Eagles, Paterson	White Eagles, Paterson, NJ	United Serbs S.B.H., Chicago
2002	Canada	Windsor, Ontario	Windsor Serbs	White Eagles, Paterson	United Serbs S.B.H., Chicago
2003	USA	Cleveland, Ohio	Karadjordje, Cleveland	White Eagles, Paterson, NJ	United Serbs S.B.H., Chicago
2004	USA	Milwaukee, Wisconsin	United Serbians – PABST	United Serbs S.B.H., Chicago	White Eagles, Paterson
2005	Canada	Niagara Falls, Ontario	Srbija Niagara Falls	United Serbs S.B.H., Chicago	White Eagles, Paterson, NJ
2006	USA	St. Petersburg, Florida	United Serbs		United Serbs S.B.H., Chicago / White Eagles, Paterson, NJ
2007	Canada	Vancouver, British Columbia	White Eagles	Hamilton Serbians, Hamilton	United Serbs S.B.H., Chicago
2008	Canada	Hamilton, Ontario	Hamilton Serbians	Hamilton Serbians, Hamilton	PMI Serbs, Chicago
2009	USA	Cleveland, Ohio	Karadjordje	White Eagles, Paterson, NJ	Karadjordje, Cleveland, Ohio
2010	USA	Phoenix, Arizona	United Serbs	White Eagles, Paterson, NJ	Karadjordje, Cleveland, Ohio
2011	USA	Chicago, Illinois	FK Morava S.B.H., Chicago	Karadjordje, Cleveland, Ohio	White Eagles, Paterson, NJ
2012	USA	Paterson, New Jersey	White Eagles, Paterson	United Serbians, Milwaukee	FK Pingvini, Orlando, FL
2013	USA	Akron, Ohio	Gavrilo Princip	Karadjordje, Cleveland, Ohio	United Serbs S.B.H., Chicago
2014	USA	Milwaukee, Wisconsin	United Serbians	Karadjordje, Cleveland, Ohio	FK Pingvini, Orlando, FL
2015	Canada	Vancouver, British Columbia	White Eagles	FK Pingvini, Orlando, FL	United Serbs, New Jersey
2016	USA	Orlando, Florida	FK Pingvini	Karadjordje, Cleveland, Ohio* / United Serbs, New Jersey*	*Co-champions - final not played due to weather
2017	USA	Chicago, Illinois	United Serbs S.B.H	Karadjordje, Cleveland, Ohio	United Serbs, New Jersey
2018	USA	Cleveland, Ohio	Karadjordje	United Serbs, New Jersey	United Serbs - Milwaukee, Wisconsin
2019	USA	Chicago, IL	FK Republika Srpska	United Serbs, New Jersey	United Serbs - Milwaukee, Wisconsin
2020	N/A	N/A	N/A	COVID-19	COVID-19
2021	USA	Parsippany, NJ	United Serbs East Coast	United Serbs - Milwaukee, Wisconsin	Crvenka - Miami, Florida
2022	USA	Akron, OH	Gavrilo Princip SD	Republika Srpska - Chicago, IL	United Serbians - Milwaukee, WI
2023	USA	Chicago, IL	FK Morava	Republika Srpska - Chicago, IL	Karadjordje - Cleveland, OH
2024	USA	Milwaukee, WI	United Serbians - Milwaukee	Karadjordje - Cleveland, OH	United Serbs - Chicago, IL
2025	USA	Cleveland, OH	Karadjordje - Cleveland, OH	Karadjordje - Cleveland, OH	United Serbians - Milwaukee, WI
2026	USA	Chicago, IL	Republika Srpska - Chicago, IL		

Club	Winners	Runners-up	Winning years
Karadjordje, Cleveland, OH	8*	3	1995, 2011, 2013, 2014, 2016*, 2017, 2024, 2025
United Serbs S.B.H., Chicago, IL	6*	8	1996, 1997, 2000, 2004, 2005, 2006*
White Eagles, Paterson, NJ	6	4	1999, 2001, 2002, 2003, 2009, 2010
United Serbians, Milwaukee, WI	3	5	1994, 2012, 2021
United Serbs, NJ	3*	2	2016*, 2018, 2019
Republika Srpska, Chicago, IL	2	0	2022, 2023
Hamilton Serbians, Ontario, Canada	2	2	2007, 2008
White Eagles, Vancouver, Canada	1	0	1995
Winona Serbs, Ontario, Canada	1	0	1998
Delije, Los Angeles, CA	1	1	1993
FK Pingvini, Orlando, FL	1	2	2015
FK Obilić, New York	0	1	
PMI Serbs, Chicago, IL	0	1	
FK Crvenka Miami, Miami, FL	0	1	

*Includes a shared title.

== Over 30 division ==
Year	Host country	Host city	Host club	Winner	Finalist
1993	Canada	Windsor, Ontario	Windsor Serbs	United Serbs S.B.H., Chicago, IL	Karadjordje, Cleveland, Oh
1994	USA	Milwaukee, Wisconsin	United Serbians – PABST	Karadjordje, Cleveland, Oh	?
1995	USA	Cleveland, Ohio	Karadjordje, Cleveland	United Serbs S.B.H., Chicago, IL	?
1996	USA	Chicago, Illinois	United Serbs S.B.H.	Karadjordje, Cleveland, OH	White Eagles, Paterson, NJ
1997	USA	Mesa, Arizona	Arizona Serbs	Delije, Los Angeles, CA	Karadjordje, Cleveland, OH
1998	Canada	Hamilton, Ontario	Winona Serbs	United Serbs, Oshawa, ON	Hamilton Serbians, Hamilton, ON
1999	USA	Chicago, Illinois	United Serbs S.B.H.	Hamilton Serbians, Hamilton, ON	White Eagles, Paterson, NJ
2000	USA	Milwaukee, Wisconsin	United Serbians – PABST	United Serbs S.B.H., Chicago, IL	United Serbians, Milwaukee, WI
2001	USA	Paterson, New Jersey	White Eagles, Paterson	Delije, Los Angeles, CA	United Serbs S.B.H., Chicago, IL
2002	Canada	Windsor, Ontario	Windsor Serbs	United Serbs, Oshawa, ON	Delije, Los Angeles, CA/United Serbs S.B.H., Chicago, IL
2003	USA	Cleveland, Ohio	Karadjordje, Cleveland	Delije, Los Angeles, CA	United Serbs, Oshawa, ON
2004	USA	Milwaukee, Wisconsin	United Serbians – PABST	Njegos, Hamilton, ON	United Serbians, Milwaukee, WI
2005	Canada	Niagara Falls, Ontario	Srbija Niagara Falls	United Serbians, Milwaukee, WI	Hamilton Serbians, Hamilton, ON
2006	USA	St. Petersburg, Florida	United Serbs	Hamilton Serbians, Hamilton, ON	United Serbians, Milwaukee, WI
2007	Canada	Vancouver, British Columbia	White Eagles	Las Vegas Stars, Las Vegas, NV	Balkan Express, Vancouver, BC
2008	Canada	Hamilton, Ontario	Hamilton Serbians	Hamilton Serbians, Hamilton, ON	Republika Srpska, Hamilton, ON
2009	USA	Cleveland, Ohio	Karadjordje	PMI Serbs, Chicago, IL	Hamilton Serbians, Hamilton, ON
2010	USA	Phoenix, Arizona	United Serbs	United Serbs S.B.H., Chicago, IL	Las Vegas Stars, Las Vegas, NV
2011	USA	Chicago, Illinois	F.K. Morava S.B.H., Chicago	United Serbs S.B.H., Chicago, IL	White Eagles, Paterson, NJ
2012	USA	Paterson, New Jersey	White Eagles, Paterson	United Serbs S.B.H., Chicago, IL	Srpski Vitezovi, Totowa, NJ
2013	USA	Akron, Ohio	Gavrilo Princip SC	United Serbs S.B.H., Chicago, IL	Republika Srpska, Hamilton, ON
2014	USA	Milwaukee, Wisconsin	United Serbians	Republika Srpska, Hamilton, ON	Karadjordje, Cleveland, OH
2015	Canada	Vancouver, British Columbia, Canada	White Eagles	United Serbs S.B.H, Chicago, IL	Karadjordje, Cleveland, OH
2016	USA	Orlando, Florida	FK Pingvini	United Serbs SC (FL)/Beli Orlovi (NJ)*	*Co-champions - final not played due to weather
2017	USA	Chicago, Illinois	United Serbs S.B.H	United Serbs S.B.H	White Eagles, Canada
2018	USA	Cleveland, Ohio	Karadjordje, Cleveland OH.	Repulika Srpska, Hamilton Canada.	Rockford. Fk. Soko IL
2019	USA	Chicago, IL	FK Republika Srpska	Compass Holding, Chicago IL	Karadjordje, Cleveland OH
2021	USA	Parsippany, NJ	United Serbs East Coast	Pingvini, Orlando FL	Desert Serbs
2022	USA	Akron, OH	Gavrilo Princip SC	Karadjordje, Cleveland OH	United Serbians, Milwaukee WI

== Over 40 division ==
Year	Host country	Host city	Host club	Winner	Finalist
1993	Canada	Windsor, Ontario	Windsor Serbs		

== Over 50 division ==
Year	Host country	Host city	Host club	Winner	Finalist
2011	USA	Chicago, Illinois	FK Morava S.B.H., Chicago	Windsor Serbs	

== Serbian Soccer Clubs in diaspora ==
=== Canada ===
- Njegos S.C.; Hamilton
- Republika Srpska F.C; Hamilton
- Hamilton Serbians S.C.; Hamilton
- Srbija FC; Niagara Falls
- Sveti Stefan F.C.; Ottawa
- Sumadija; Hamilton
- White Eagles S.C.;Vancouver
- Serbian White Eagles; Toronto
- Windsor Serbs; Windsor
- London Serbs; London
- Winona Serbs; Hamilton
- FC Serbia United; Vancouver

=== United States ===
- Rockford Serbs; Rockford, Illinois
- United Serbs - S.B.H; Chicago, Illinois
- White Eagles; Paterson, New Jersey
- SSK Karadjordje; Cleveland, Ohio
- FK Ujedinjeni Srbi; Milwaukee, Wisconsin
- FK Fratello; Milwaukee, Wisconsin
- FK Ravna Gora; Los Angeles, California
- FK Srbija; New York, New York
- FK Republika Srpska; Chicago, Illinois
- FK Marakana; Chicago, Illinois
- FK Morava - S.B.H; Chicago, Illinois
- FK Nikola Tesla; Chicago, Illinois
- FK Pingvini; Orlando, Florida
- White Eagles SC; Paterson, New Jersey
- FK Drina; San Jose, California
- FK Gavrilo Princip; Akron, Ohio
- Crvena Zvezda; St. Louis, Missouri
- SC White Eagles; Atlanta, Georgia
- United Serbs East Coast; Parsippany, New Jersey
- FK Soko Rokford; Rockford, Illinois
- FK Sloga; Fort Worth, Texas

=== Australia ===
- Canberra White Eagles
- Bonnyrigg White Eagles
- White City Woodville
- White City Football Club
- Dianella White Eagles
- Berwick Kings Krajina
- Fitzroy City Serbia
- Noble Park United
- Springvale White Eagles
- Westgate Sindjelic
- Albion Park White Eagles
- Maddington Eagles

=== Germany ===
- KSV Tempo; Frankfurt
- FC Jadran Mannheim 1969 e.V.; Mannheim
- SK Srbija; München
- FC-Srbija Ulm; Ulm
- FC Jugoslavija; Freiburg
- FC Srbija Kassel; Kassel
- SKV Jedinstvo; Ludwigsburg
- FK Crvena Zvezda; Stuttgart
- SV Sveti Sava; Reutlingen
- OFK Beograd Stuttgart e.V. 1971; Stuttgart
- FC JAT Fellbach e.V.; Fellbach

=== Switzerland ===
- FK Srbija; Uzwil
- FK Republika Srpska; Zurich
- FC Sloboda; Basel
- SK Jugoslavija; Zurich
- FK Srbija; Luzern

=== Austria ===
- Crvena Zvezda; Schalchen
- FK Buducnost; Schwechat
- FK Beograd; Wien
- FK Crvena Zvezda; Wien
- FK Hajduk Veljko; Wien
- FK Jedinstvo; Wien
- FK Kristal; Wien
- FK Udarnik; Oberlam
- FK Borac; Rankweil
- FK Drina; Lustenau
- FK Korenita; Feldkirch
- FK Kozara; Bregenz
- FK Sloga; Hard
- FK Banja Luka; Bludenz
