= Brampton City United FC =

Canadian soccer team

- Full name: Brampton City United Football Club
- Nicknames: The Lions, United
- Founded: 2002; 23 years ago (as Toronto Lions Football Club)
- Stadium: Victoria Park Stadium; Brampton, Ontario
- Capacity: 2,000
- Chairman: Jose Leal, Mike Dimatteo
- Manager: Juan Barreto
- League: CAF LIKA Supergroup Open Division
- Website: http://www.bramptoncityutd.ca/
Home colours	Away colours

Brampton City United FC is a Canadian soccer team, founded in 2002. The team plays in the Lika Supergroup Open Division. The club plays out of Victoria Park Stadium in the community of Brampton, Ontario.

The Metro Lions were the second club from Scarborough, Toronto to join the Canadian Professional Soccer League in 2002. In their debut season, the team was an instant threat to the established clubs in the league finishing runners up in their division, and reaching the semi-finals in the postseason. The Lions struggled in their sophomore season, but rebounded the following season. In 2005, the organization merged with the Oakville Soccer Club and Oakville Premier Soccer Academy which resulted in the relocation to Oakville, Ontario under the name Oakville Blue Devils. Oakville managed to acquire several USL, and top CPSL veterans in their debut season. The acquisitions were vital in the club capturing their first CPSL Championship. In their second season the club failed to defend their championship, but still added silverware to their trophy cabinet by clinching their first National Division title.

In 2007, saw a conclusion to the Oakville experiment as the club returned to Scarborough under the name Canadian Lions. In 2008, the franchise relocated once again to Brampton under the name Brampton Lions. During the club's tenure in Brampton the Lions have managed to become a consistent playoff contender missing the playoffs only three times. In 2011, the club re-branded as Brampton City United, and left the CSL in 2016 to compete in CAF LIKA Supergroup Open Division.

== History ==
=== Early days (2002–04) ===
Toronto Lions FC were formed in 2002 under the ownership of Arnold Milan, and Anthony Ayo serving as the club's president. The administration board consisted of Bill Dixon, Francois Glasman, and Aldwyn McGill serving in the General Secretary, Treasurer, and Club's Promotions and Liaison roles. The club's territory was located in Scarborough, Toronto, and Birchmount Stadium served as the home venue. Tony Laferrara was selected as the club's first head coach. Laferrara notable signings were Brian Bowes, Darryl Gomez, Anton Skerritt, Caswain Mason, and O'Neil Brown serving as team captain.

In the first part of the season club president Ayo resigned and was replaced by McGill. Subsequently, three weeks later after a 3–3 record, Laferrara was dismissed from his role with McGill given further responsibilities as head coach. McGill managed to achieve a seven-game undefeated streak which led to a postseason berth by finishing third in the Eastern Conference. The Metro Lions posted the second best defensive record, and finished in the top five with the best offensive record. In the postseason the Lions faced division champions Ottawa Wizards, but suffered a 1–0 defeat. McGill was awarded the CPSL Coach of the Year.

For the 2003 season McGill signed Trinidadian international Hayden Fitzwilliams, Aaron Benjamin, Maxim Dorneval, Nikola Vignjević, and Gabriel Pop. Unfortunately the Lions failed to repeat their previous success, which resulted in McGill transferring his head coach responsibilities to Goran Miscevic. Though the Lions performed poorly during the regular season they still managed to find success in the Open Canada Cup tournament. In the tournament the club reached the finals where they faced London City, but lost the match on penalties by a score of 4–2. Their season concluded with a fifth-place finish in the Eastern Conference, and failed to secure a postseason berth.

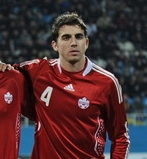
Dejan Jakovic began his career with the Canadian Lions before he went overseas.

In the 2004 the club formed an affiliation with G.S. United Soccer Club of the Ontario Soccer League in order to develop players. During the regular season Miscevic managed to completely transform the team by finishing second in the Eastern Conference. The Lions finished with the second best offensive record, and only recorded three losses. In the postseason the club faced the Vaughan Shooters, but were eliminated by a score 5–3.

=== Relocation to Oakville and championship (2005–06) ===
On March 30, 2005, it was announced the Metro Lions were purchased by Oakville Soccer Club, and Oakville Premier Soccer Academy relocated to Oakville for the 2005 CPSL season. The franchise was renamed to Oakville Blue Devils, and their home venue was moved to Bronte Stadium.

Former Toronto Lynx head coach, and president of the Premier Soccer Academy Duncan Wilde was appointed manager. Wilde only retained the services of Pop, Dorneval, and Kevin Ricketts from the previous season. He would stack up his roster with players with USL experience particularly from the Toronto Lynx. The signings included Darren Baxter, Aaron Steele, Shawn Faria, Igor Prostran, Sergio De Luca, and CSL veterans Phil Ionadi, Sa Brahima Traore, Marko Bedenikovic, Ryan Gamble, Domico Coddington, Angel Velazquez, Orlin Chalmers, and Paul Daccobert. Oakville immediately made an impact by posting a seven-game undefeated streak, and recorded the best offensive record. Oakville finished first in the Western Conference, but had points deducted due to discipline related violations. The deduction resulted in Oalville losing their division title by finishing as runners up. In the first round of the postseason the Blue Devils faced the Windsor Border Stars, and advanced to the semi-finals by a score of 3–1. In the semi-finals Oakville faced Hamilton Thunder, and won the match by a score of 2–0. In the CPSL Championship final match Oakville faced Vaughan Shooters during the match the Shooters struck first with a goal from Stalin Cardenas, ten minutes later De Luca scored the equalizer sending the match to overtime where Gamble came off the bench to score the winning goal and capture the organizations first championship title.

In 2006, Wilde returned to manage the Toronto Lynx, which resulted in a mass exodus of players not returning. Former team captain Phil Ionadi was appointed as his successor. Notable acquisitions were Judah Hernandez, Matthew O'Connor, Miles O'Connor, and Huffman Eja-Tabe. Ionadi managed to achieve a respectable season by clinching the club's first National Division title. In the playoffs Oakville failed to defend their championship title after elimination from Windsor by a score of 2–1.

=== Return to Scarborough (2007) ===
The following season saw an end to the Oakville affiliation which relocated the organization back to Scarborough. The team was renamed the Canadian Lions, and transferred over to the International Division. The Scarborough side brought back the services of Miscevic for the 2007 season. Notable young prospects that featured during the season were Evan Milward, Dejan Jakovic, and Jamaal Smith. During the regular season the Lions secured their fourth playoff berth by finishing fourth in their division. In the first round of the playoffs the team faced St. Catharines Wolves, but suffered a 10–9 loss on penalties.

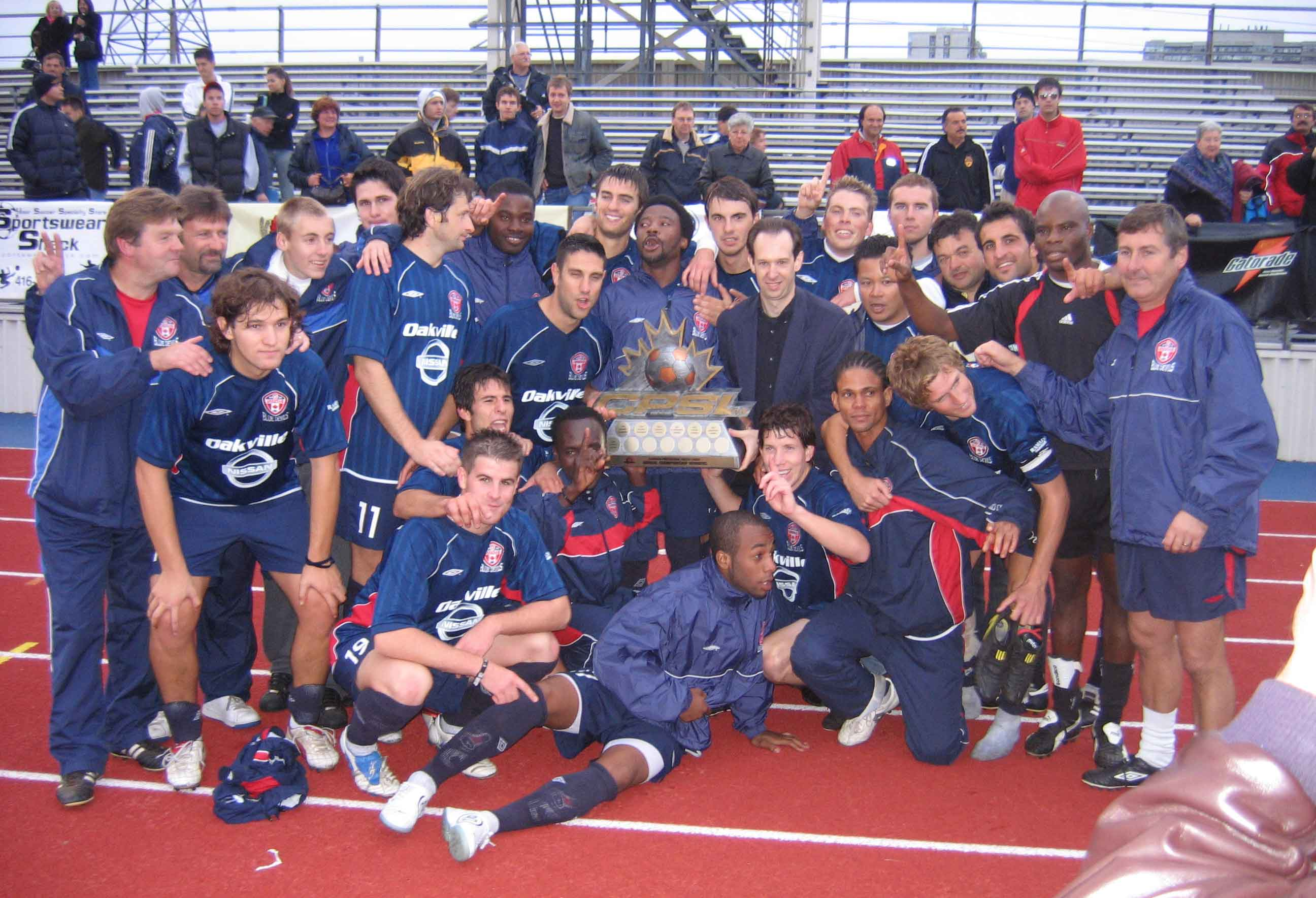
Oakville Blue Devils celebrating CPSL Championship in 2005.

=== Brampton and Costa era (2008–12) ===
On March 13, 2008, the Lions were relocated to Brampton and returned to the National Division for the 2008 season, prompting another name change to Brampton Lions but still maintaining the team's name, logo, history and statistics. The Lions announced their coaching staff on March 30, signing Armando Costa as manager. On April 10 the team held a press conference announcing their management team, hiring Phil Ionadi as the Director of Business Operations, and Costa as the Director of Soccer Operations and Manager. Costa brought in former Toronto Lynx players Jeremy Shepherd, Cameron Medwin, and Adolfo Mella. In his first season managing the team he secured a playoff berth by finishing third in the National Division. Their opponents in the quarterfinals were Italia Shooters after a scoreless game the match went into overtime where Italia emerged victorious from a goal by Marco Terminesi. At the conclusion of the season the league awarded Daniel Nascimento the CSL MVP & Golden Boot award.

On March 29, 2009, the Brampton Lions announced the affiliation with Dixie Soccer Club where Dixie SC will serve as the reserve side for the Lions while playing in the CSL Reserve Division. In the 2009 season the Lions repeated their previous season result by finishing third in the National Division. In the quarterfinals Brampton faced Toronto Croatia, and lost the series by a score of 4–1. The 2010 season marked the first time in six years when the club failed to secure a postseason berth by finishing tenth in the overall standings missing the final berth by two points.

On January 16, 2011, Brampton announced another re-branding to Brampton City United FC under the new ownership of Michael DiMatteo and Leal Jose The new crest bears a strong resemblance to the English Premier League's Manchester United, with a majestic lion in place of Manchester's traditional red devil. Notable additions to the roster were Jamaican international Richard West, and Marcos Nunes. Brampton bounced back from their mediocre 2010 season with an impressive fourth-place finish with the third best offensive record. Their opponents in the quarterfinals were the Serbian White Eagles, but received an 8–0 thrashing in a two-game series. The 2012 season was a disappointing season where Brampton finished twelfth in the overall standings failing to clinch a postseason berth. Brampton also lost the services of Armando Costa who died after a two-year battle with cancer.

In addition to the CSL club, Brampton United also fielded a team in the Canadian Premier Futsal League. The newly formed CPFL also included the Mississauga Eagles FC, local CSL rivals of the Lions. Home games are played at Mississauga's Hershey Centre with the debut season of the CPFL running from January to April with 12 regular season games and a playoff championship. After a very successful first year, Brampton United defeated the Toronto Boca Juniors 6–3 at Seneca College to capture the 2012 CPFL Championship.

=== Player development and CAF Open division (2013–present) ===
The Brampton organization found a replacement to Costa by elevating assistant coach Juan Barreto to the head coach position. Barreto changes to the roster were the signings of Cuban international Reysander Fernández, and several CSL veterans as Mirko Medic, Adrijan Tismenar, Oscar Cordon, Mark Jankovic, Alex Braletic, and Milos Scepanovic. The changes brought success on the field as Brampton recovered from their disastrous 2012 season by finishing fourth in the overall standings. In the postseason once again the Lions failed to advance to the next round after suffering a 4–0 defeat to SC Waterloo Region.

In their final two seasons in the CSL the team went into a decline in performance where in the 2014 season Brampton barely qualified for the postseason by clinching the final playoff berth by one point. For the second year in a row the team were eliminated in the quarterfinals by York Region Shooters. The following season Brampton were suspended near the conclusion of the season, and as a result the club didn't return for the 2016 season. On April 14, 2016, Brampton joined the newly formed Lika Supergroup Open Division.

== Crest ==
As the Lions, the team maintained a similar logo for most of their history, aside from the 2005 and 2006 seasons when they were purchased by the Oakville Soccer Club and renamed the Oakville Blue Devils. The modified version of the Lions logo returned when the team was relocated to Scarborough, and once again when the team was moved to Brampton. For the 2011 season the club underwent a complete rebranding and received a new crest similar in style to Manchester United. The new crest pays homage to the club's history with a heraldic lion featured in the center.

Metro Lions crest
(2002–04)

Oakville Blue Devils crest
(2005–06)

Canadian Lions crest
(2007)

Brampton Lions crest
(2008–2010)

== Honours ==
Brampton United captured their first CSL Championship on October 10, 2005, in a 2–1 match against the Vaughan Shooters at Esther Shiner Stadium. The winning goal was scored during extra time in the 100' minute by Ryan Gamble. At the time, the club was still known as the Oakville Blue Devils.

- CPSL Championship (1): 2005
- Canadian Soccer League National Division (1): 2006
- Canadian Premier Futsal League Championship (1): 2012

== Head coaches ==
Years	Name	Nation
2002	Tony Laferrara	Canada
2002-2003	Aldwyn McGill	Trinidad and Tobago
2003-2004	Goran Miscevic	Serbia
2005	Duncan Wilde	England
2006	Phil Ionadi	Canada
2007	Goran Miscevic	Serbia
2008-2012	Armando Costa	Portugal
2013-	Juan Barreto	Colombia

== Year-by-year ==
Year	Division	League	Regular season	Playoffs
2002	First - Eastern Conference	CPSL	2nd	Semi Final
2003	First - Eastern Conference	CPSL	5th	did not qualify
2004	First - Eastern Conference	CPSL	2nd	Quarter Final
2005	First - Western Conference	CPSL	2nd	Champions
2006	First - National Division	CSL	1st	Quarter Final
2007	First - International Division	CSL	4th	Quarter Final
2008	First - National Division	CSL	3rd	Quarter Final
2009	First - National Division	CSL	3rd	Quarter Final
2010	First	CSL	10th	did not qualify
2011	First	CSL	4th	Quarter Final
2012	First	CSL	11th	did not qualify
2013	First	CSL	4th	Quarter final
2014	First	CSL	8th	Quarter final
2015	First	CSL	9th	did not qualify

== Notable players ==
Canada

- Marko Bedenikovic (2005)
- Aaron Benjamin (2003-04)
- Orlin Chalmers (2005, 2007-09)
- Oscar Cordon (2013)
- Paul Daccobert (2005)
- Sergio De Luca (2005)
- Huffman Eja-Tabe (2006)
- Shawn Faria (2005)
- Phil Ionadi (2005)
- Dejan Jakovic (2007)
- Cameron Medwin (2009-11)
- Adolfo Mella (2008)
- Evan Milward 2007
- Marcos Nunes (2013)
- Matthew O'Connor (2005, 2008)
- Igor Prostran (2005)
- Jeremy Shepherd (2005, 2008-11)
- Tarik Robertson (2011-13)
- David Velastegui (2012)

Bermuda

- Domico Coddington (2005)

Cuba

- Reysander Fernández (2013-15)

Guyana

- Jelani Smith (2007)

Jamaica

- Gregory Messam (2004)
- Richard West (2011)

Saint Kitts and Nevis

- Darryl Gomez (2002-04)

Saint Vincent and the Grenadines

- Caswain Mason (2002-04)

Trinidad and Tobago

- Hayden Fitzwilliams (2003-04)
- Judah Hernandez (2006, 2011)
- Anton Skerritt (2002-03)
- Jonathan Westmaas (2007)
