= Toronto ThunderHawks =

- Full name: Toronto ThunderHawks
- Founded: 2000
- Dissolved: 2001
- Stadium: Hershey Centre
- Capacity: 5,612
- League: NPSL

Toronto ThunderHawks were an indoor soccer team based in Mississauga, Ontario that competed in the defunct NPSL. The team began play in the 2000–2001 season, with home games at the Hershey Centre. The team was owned by businessman Neil Jamieson and National Hockey League Hockey Hall of Fame defenseman Paul Coffey. The owners also purchased the Montreal Impact of the NPSL and suspended the club, transferring many of the Impact players to the ThunderHawks.

The head coach was Gary Hindley, who had led the Cleveland Crunch to the NPSL championship in 1993–94. When the NPSL disbanded in the summer of 2001 and reorganized as the MISL, the ThunderHawks were admitted to the new league under the condition that they would suspend operations for the 2001–2002 season to work on the business side of the franchise and return to active competition for the 2002–2003 season. However, the team never returned from this temporary suspension of operations.

== Year-by-year record ==
Year	League	Games	Won	Lost	Pct	PF	PA	Finish	Playoffs	Avg. attendance
2000–01	NPSL	40	21	19	.525	574	556	2nd National	Lost Conference Finals	1,985

== Year by year attendance ==
- 2000-2001: 1,985
