= Duncan Wilde =

English soccer manager

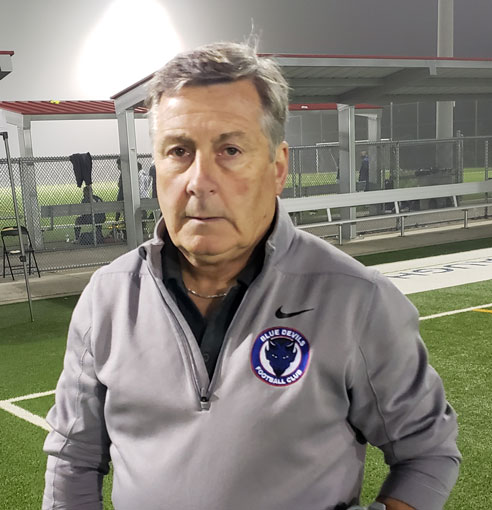
- Wilde in 2024

Personal information
- Full name: Duncan Wilde
- Place of birth: Manchester, England

Managerial career
- Years: Team
- 2003: Hamilton Thunder
- 2004: Toronto Lynx
- 2005: Oakville Blue Devils
- 2006–2015: Toronto Lynx
- 2015–: Blue Devils FC

Duncan Wilde is an English soccer manager who is currently the manager of Blue Devils FC in League1 Ontario.

== Managerial career ==
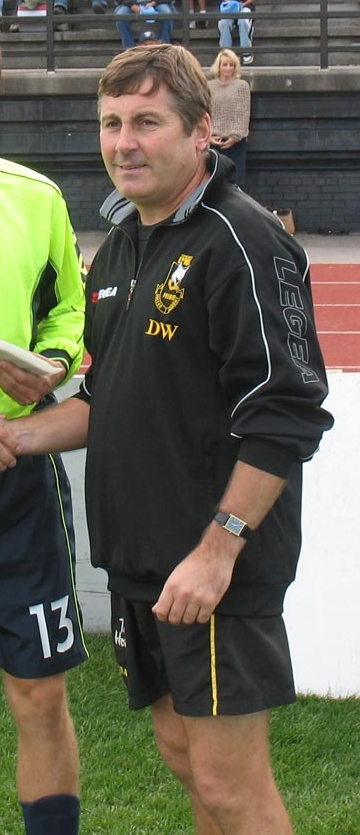
Wilde with the Toronto Lynx

On May 15, 2003 at the Canadian Professional Soccer League press conference the Hamilton Thunder announced Wilde as the new head coach for the 2003 season. After leading the Thunder to a six-game undefeated streak, Wilde resigned from his post as head coach after a team meeting with Hamilton owner Italo Ferrari on July 22, 2003. For the remainder of the year Wilde ran his summer camps at his Premier Soccer Academy. The following year he signed a contract with the Toronto Lynx of the USL A-League. After failing to qualify for the post season, Wilde resigned as head coach at the conclusion of the season to resume his coaching responsibilities with the Lynx Youth Academy.

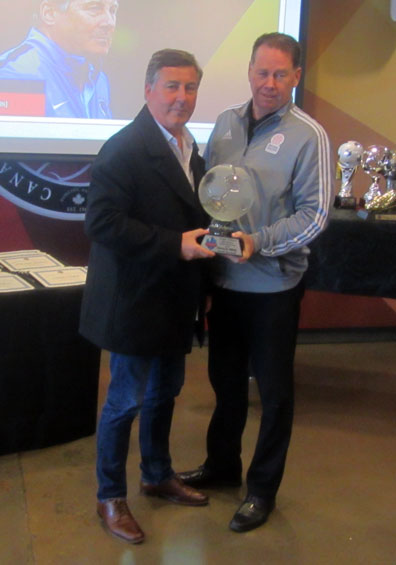
Wilde receives L1O Coach of the Year award in 2019

On March 30, 2005 the Oakville Soccer Club together with the Oakville-based Premier Soccer Academy, acquired the franchise rights of the Metro Lions and relocated the team to Oakville and renamed the club the Oakville Blue Devils. During the conference Wilde was announced as the team manager for the 2005 season. Under the guidance of Wilde the club won the CSL Cup with a 2-1 victory over Vaughan Shooters, and finished second in the Western Conference. On February 26, 2006 the Toronto Lynx announced the return of Duncan Wilde as head coach for the 2006 USL season. Though the Lynx failed to qualify for the play-offs, Wilde achieved a 10-game team record undefeated streak at home and reached the finals of the Open Canada Cup, but lost the match 2–0 against Ottawa St. Anthony Italia. In 2008 Wilde led the Lynx to the playoffs for the first time since 2000, but unfortunately for the Lynx, the Cleveland Internationals scored a late winner to take the game 2–1, sending the Lynx home early.

After spending 10 years with the Lynx, Wilde rejoined Oakville in 2015. In the 2017 season, he led them to their second League1 Ontario title.

== Managerial stats ==
| Team | Nat | From | To | Record | | | | |
| Team | Nat | From | To | G | W | L | D | Win % |
|---|---|---|---|---|---|---|---|---|
| Hamilton Thunder | (Canada) | 15 May 2003 | 22 July 2003 | 7 | 4 | 0 | 3 | 57.14 |
| Toronto Lynx | (Canada) | 8 January 2004 | 18 September 2004 | 28 | 10 | 16 | 2 | 35.71 |
| Oakville Blue Devils | (Canada) | 30 March 2005 | 10 October 2005 | 22 | 10 | 5 | 7 | 45.45 |
| Toronto Lynx | (Canada) | 26 February 2006 | Present | 152 | 46 | 81 | 23 | 30.26 |

== Honours ==
=== Managerial honours ===
Oakville Blue Devils

- CPSL Championship: 1

2005
