= Ottawa St. Anthony Italia =

- Full name: Ottawa St. Anthony Italia Soccer Club
- Founded: 1952
- Director of Soccer Operations: Claudio Padovan
- League: Ottawa-Carleton Soccer League

The Ottawa St. Anthony Italia is an amateur soccer club based in Ottawa, Ontario. The club was founded in 1952 as the St. Anthony men's soccer team and played in a local league. In 1959, the team consolidated with another local team known as "Italia" to form Ottawa St. Anthony Italia. In 1965, the team joined the Quebec National Soccer League, where it won 5 championships. More recently, the men's competitive team won the Open Canada Cup and the Canadian National Challenge Cup to become champions in 2006.

The organization currently fields multiple teams in both recreational and competitive divisions of the Ottawa-Carleton Soccer League and ERSL, East Region Soccer League, including youth and adult men's and women's teams.

== History ==
The team was runner up to the Windsor Border Stars in the 2004 Open Canada Cup.

In 2006, Italia were Open Canada Cup and Canadian National Challenge Cup champions.

In 2013, the boys U14 team won the Eastern Ontario District Soccer Association L5 league, and was promoted to the ERSL.

In 2018, the men's team were finalists in the Ontario Cup, losing 1-0 to Caledon FC.

=== 2006 Open Canada Cup ===
The competitive club's most recent triumph came with winning the Open Canada Cup in 2006, defeating the Toronto Lynx who, at the time, were members of the USL First Division, two tiers above Italia in the Canadian soccer pyramid.

== Honours ==
- 2006 Ontario Cup
- 2006 Open Canada Cup
- 2006 Canadian National Challenge Cup
