= Toronto Lynx =

Association football team in Canada

- Full name: Toronto Lynx Soccer Club
- Nickname: The Lynx
- Founded: 1996
- Dissolved: 2017
- Stadium: Centennial Park Stadium; Toronto, Ontario, Canada
- Capacity: 2,200
- Owner: Bruno Hartrell
- Head Coach: Duncan Wilde
- League: USL Premier Development League
- 2014: 5th, Great Lakes; Playoffs: DNQ
- Website: http://www.torontolynxpremiersoccer.com
Home colours	Away colours

Early Toronto Lynx logo

Toronto Lynx was a Canadian soccer team based in Toronto, Ontario, Canada. Founded in 1997, the team last played in the 2014 season of the Premier Development League (PDL), the fourth tier of the American Soccer Pyramid, in the Great Lakes Division of the Central Conference. The team played its home games at Centennial Park Stadium, where they had played since 2003. The team's colours were white, gold and black. The team had a sister organization, the Toronto Lady Lynx, who played in the women's USL W-League, and also fielded a team in the USL's Super-20 League, a league for players 17 to 20 years of age run under the United Soccer Leagues umbrella.

In 2015, the Lynx men's senior team was incorporated into League1 Ontario side Oakville Blue Devils. In late 2017, the teams merged completely under Oakville's umbrella.

== History ==
=== A-League/USL First Division ===
The Toronto Lynx announced its expansion rights in Toronto on June 24, 1996, and played their first A-League game in Jacksonville, Florida, on April 12, 1997, falling 3–1 to the Jacksonville Cyclones. The Toronto Lynx set an A-League record of 10 consecutive wins during their first season in 1997. In 2000, the Lynx proceeded to the Eastern Conference Finals and only a 1–0 loss to the Rochester Raging Rhinos kept the Lynx out of the A-League Championship game. Despite these temporary successes, over the years it spent in the A-League (later renamed USL-D1), the team fared relatively poorly on the field and ultimately failed to consistently draw crowds of more than about 2000 people.

Peter Pinizzotto was the Toronto Lynx head coach from 1997 to 2003. The team made one playoff appearance under his reign. The next season he would be hired as assistant coach for rivals Montreal Impact. In September 2003, Duncan Wilde was appointed as the new Toronto Lynx head coach for the 2004 season bringing a new philosophy and vision for the club. Wilde also holds the position of Director of the Toronto Lynx Premier Soccer Academy and Super Y-League Program for accomplishing the mission of developing and inspiring youth soccer talent in the Greater Toronto Area. After just one season, Wilde resigned from his head coaching position amidst rumours of owner interference in squad selection. During the 2005 season the team was managed by former Lynx goalkeeper Hubert Busby Jr., though Wilde returned as head coach for the 2006 season. In their debut season in the Open Canada Cup Wilde led the Lynx to the final of the tournament, but were defeated 2–0 by Ottawa St. Anthony Italia.

During their time in the A-League and USL First Division, the Lynx were noted for developing a number of notable players, but failed to retain most of them for long, leading to poor results in the league standings.

On October 10, 2006, the Lynx announced they were voluntarily relegating themselves two levels, to the USL Premier Development League. The reasons for this were never fully revealed, but it was most likely due to their low attendance (the lowest in the USL 1st Division at that time) and the fact that Major League Soccer expansion franchise Toronto FC would be arriving to the city the next season.

=== USL Premier Development League ===
Toronto's first year in the PDL was a difficult one; they lost their opening game 3–0 to West Michigan Edge, and didn't pick up their first win until the fifth game of the season, a 2–0 defeat away at the Indiana Invaders. The Lynx's main problem was inconsistency, especially away from home, where they suffered several difficult defeats, including a 4–0 thrashing at the hands of Michigan Bucks, and a 3–1 defeat to Cleveland Internationals in early August. Their home form was generally much better, and they enjoyed several excellent results, notably a comprehensive 5–0 win over Indiana Invaders that included a two–goal haul for Murphy Wiredu, and a 5–1 revenge win over Cleveland in which Wiredu scored another brace. An unexpected 3–1 victory over divisional champs Michigan on the final day of the season ended the year brightly; they finished in fourth place, just six points off a playoff spot. The prolific Murphy Wiredu was the Lynx's top scorer, with 10 goals.

Toronto built on their 2007 form with a generally better season in 2008. They overpowered Fort Wayne Fever 4–1 in their opening fixture in front of over 1,200 fans, and enjoyed a scintillating run of form throughout the month of June, picking up five wins two ties in nine games, including a breathless 3–2 win over West Michigan Edge in which they scored twice in the last two minutes, and a strong 1–0 win over the eventual divisional champions, Michigan Bucks. Despite a pair of impressive back-to-back 4–0 wins over Indiana Invaders and Cincinnati Kings in the run-in—the last of which saw all four goals being scored by Daniel Revivo—Toronto's final day defeat to Michigan left them in third place in the Great Lakes division, squeaking into the playoffs on 'games won' ahead of Des Moines Menace, but needing to negotiate a preliminary 'Divisional Round' play-in game against Cleveland Internationals. Unfortunately for the Lynx, Cleveland scored a late winner to take the game 2–1, sending the Ontarians home early. Daniel Revivo was Toronto's top scorer, with nine goals on the season, while Welshman Lloyd Grist contributed four assists.

=== Club data ===
- All-time leading goal scorer: Nikola Vignjevic (29)
- All-time games played: David Diplacido, (206)
- All-time assists: Nikola Vignjevic (24)
- All-time clean sheets: Theo Zagar (30.5)

== Players ==
=== Notable former players ===
This list of notable former players comprises players who went on to play professional soccer after playing for the team in the Premier Development League, or those who previously played professionally before joining the team.

- (Canada) Andres Arango
- (Canada) Robbie Aristodemo
- (Guyana) Adrian Butters
- (Canada) Anthony Bahadur
- (England) Darren Baxter
- (Jamaica) Lloyd Barker
- (Australia) Chris Broadfoot
- (Canada) Nikola Budalić
- (Canada) Dwayne De Rosario
- (Canada) David Diplacido
- (Canada) Jamie Dodds
- (Canada) Charles Gbeke
- (Canada) Ali Gerba
- (Canada) Atiba Hutchinson
- (Trinidad and Tobago) Kevin Jeffrey
- (Canada) John Jonke
- (Canada) Milan Kojic
- (Canada) Tom Kouzmanis
- (Canada) Joe Mattacchione
- (Canada) Mikael McNamara
- (Canada) Cameron Medwin
- (Northern Ireland) Dwain Anderson
- (Bermuda) John Barry Nusum
- (Canada) Pat Onstad
- (Canada) Dominic Oppong
- (Canada) Matthew Palleschi
- (Canada) Vince Petrasso
- (Canada) Chris Pozniak
- (Canada) Marco Reda
- (Canada) Adrian Serioux
- (Canada) Paul Stalteri
- (Trinidad and Tobago) Rick Titus
- (Serbia) Nikola Vignjević
- (Portugal) R Jay Vieira
- (Argentina) Mauricio Vincello
- (Canada) Chris Williams
- (Canada) Theo Zagar
- (Canada) Sherif El-Masri
- (Canada) Jordan Webb

=== Staff ===
- (England) Duncan Wilde – academy director and head coach
- (Scotland) Billy Steele – men's senior coach
- (Scotland) Danny Stewart – women's senior coach
- (Canada) Glen McNamara – goalkeeper coach
- (Canada) Robert Gringmuth – medical coordinator
- (Canada) Frank Markus – team doctor

== Year-by-year ==
Year	Division	League	Regular season	Playoffs	Voyageurs Cup	Open Canada Cup
1997	2	USISL A-League	4th, Northeast	Division Semifinals	N/A	did not participate
1998	2	USISL A-League	6th, Northeast	did not qualify	N/A	did not participate
1999	2	USL A-League	7th, Northeast	did not qualify	N/A	did not participate
2000	2	USL A-League	3rd, Northeast	Conference Finals	N/A	did not participate
2001	2	USL A-League	7th, Northern	did not qualify	N/A	did not participate
2002	2	USL A-League	3rd, Northeast	did not qualify	2nd	did not participate
2003	2	USL A-League	5th, Northeast	did not qualify	2nd	did not participate
2004	2	USL A-League	7th, Eastern	did not qualify	2nd	did not participate
2005	2	USL First Division	12th	did not qualify	3rd	did not participate
2006	2	USL First Division	10th	did not qualify	2nd	Runner-up
2007	4	USL PDL	4th, Great Lakes	did not qualify	N/A	did not participate
2008	4	USL PDL	3rd, Great Lakes	Divisional Round	N/A	N/A
2009	4	USL PDL	9th, Great Lakes	did not qualify	N/A	N/A
2010	4	USL PDL	7th, Great Lakes	did not qualify	N/A	N/A
2011	4	USL PDL	7th, Great Lakes	did not qualify	N/A	N/A
2012	4	USL PDL	6th, Great Lakes	did not qualify	N/A	N/A
2013	4	USL PDL	5th, Great Lakes	did not qualify	N/A	N/A
2014	4	USL PDL	5th, Great Lakes	did not qualify	N/A	N/A

=== International friendlies ===
- September 7, 1998 – Toronto Lynx 2, Persepolis 0 (Iranian First Division champions), Persepolis fielded a reserve team
- June 5, 1999 – Santa Clara 2 (Portuguese First Division), Toronto Lynx 1
- June 6, 2000 – Reggina (Italian Serie A) 2, Toronto Lynx 0
- May 14, 2002 – Toronto Lynx 1, 1860 Munich 0 (German Bundesliga)

== Head coaches ==
- (Canada) Peter Pinizzotto (1997–2003)
- (England) Duncan Wilde (2004)
- (Canada) Hubert Busby Jr. (2005)
- (England) Duncan Wilde (2006–2014)

== Stadiums ==
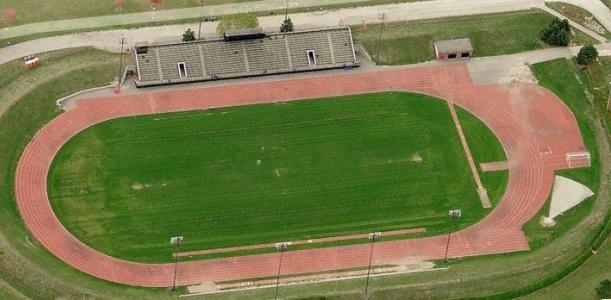
Lynx's stadium, Centennial Park Stadium

- Centennial Park Stadium; Toronto, Ontario (2003–2014)
- Varsity Stadium; Toronto, Ontario four games (2008–2009)
- Brian Timmis Stadium; Hamilton, Ontario one game (2008)
- Edelweiss Park; Bolton, Ontario three games (2008–2009)
- Hershey Centre; Mississauga, Ontario three games (2009–2010)
- Barrie Community Sports Complex; Barrie, Ontario one game (2009)
- OSA Soccer Center; Vaughan, Ontario one game (2011)

== Average attendance ==
Attendance stats are calculated by averaging each team's self-reported home attendances from the historical match archive at: USLSoccer.com (archived 5 January 2010) and Kenn.com https://kenn.com/blog/soccer/all-time-usl-league-two-attendance/.

- 1997: 1,538
- 1998: 1,800
- 1999: 2,744
- 2000: 2,620
- 2001: 2,795
- 2002: 1,730
- 2003: 2,652
- 2004: 2,444
- 2005: 2,462
- 2006: 1,551 (USL First Division)
- 2007: 1,198 (4th in PDL)
- 2008: 1,018 (8th in PDL)
- 2009: 500 or 478 (22nd in PDL)
- 2010: 427 or 241 (37th in PDL)
- 2011: 194 or 192 (43rd in PDL)
- 2012: 106 (63rd in PDL)
- 2013: 143 (48th in PDL)
- 2014: 225 (36th in PDL)
