= 2006 Open Canada Cup =

Tournament details
- Country: Canada
- Teams: 18

Final positions
- Champions: Ottawa St. Anthony Italia (1st title)
- Runners-up: Toronto Lynx

Tournament statistics
- Matches played: 18
- Goals scored: 53 (2.94 per match)
- Top goal scorer(s): Urbain Some, Abraham Osman, Helio Pereira, Dragorad Milicevic, Haris Cekic (3 goals each)

The 2006 Open Canada Cup was the 9th edition of the Canadian Soccer League's open league cup tournament, running from late May through late September. Ottawa St. Anthony Italia defeated Toronto Lynx 2-0 in the final played at Cove Road Stadium, London, Ontario. Ottawa became the first victorious amateur club in the tournament's history, and the first amateur club to claim a purely Canadian treble (Open Canada Cup, Ontario Cup, and The Challenge Trophy). The tournament expanded to include, for the first time, the Toronto Lynx of the USL First Division, at that time the nation's top-tier division. Notable entries included the reigning Spectator Cup champions Hamilton Serbia, and the 2005 Canadian National Challenge Cup, Ontario Cup champions, Scarborough GS United, both from the Ontario Soccer League.

The Ontario and Quebec amateur clubs began the tournament in the preliminary rounds, while the CSL clubs and Toronto Lynx received an automatic bye to the second round. For the fifth straight year, London City were awarded the hosting rights to the finals, which granted them a wild card match if they were defeated in the earlier rounds. All CSL clubs competed in the competition except Toronto Croatia, which opted out to compete in the annual Croatian-North American Soccer Tournament.

== Qualification ==
Enter in Preliminary Round	Enter in Second Round
OSL/LSEQ/OCSL/WOSL; 3 teams/1 team/1 team/1 team	CSL/USL; 11 teams/1 team
Ontario Soccer League: Scarborough GS United; Hamilton Argentina 78; Hamilton Serbia; Ligue de Soccer Elite Quebec: Montreal Panellinios; Ottawa Carleton Soccer League: Ottawa St. Anthony Italia; Western Ontario Soccer League: AEK London	Canadian Soccer League: Brampton Stallions; Caribbean Selects; Italia Shooters; Laval Dynamites; London City; North York Astros; Oakville Blue Devils; Serbian White Eagles; St. Catharines Wolves; Toronto Supra Portuguese; Windsor Border Stars; USL First Division: Toronto Lynx

== First round ==
May 20, 2006	Ottawa St. Anthony Italia (OCSL)	2–0 (forfeited)	Montreal Panellinios (LSEQ)	Ottawa, Ontario
		(Report)		Stadium: Gee-Gees Field

May 21, 2006	Hamilton Serbia (OSL)	1–0	GS United (OSL)	Hamilton, Ontario
5:00 ET	Igor Prostran	(Report)		Stadium: Brian Timmis Stadium

June 30, 2006	AEK London (WOSL)	5–0	Hamilton Argentina 78 (OSL)	London, Ontario
8:38 ET	Jaufcin Guy 3'; Haris Cekic 27'; Paul Arnold 33'; Noel Cunningham 74'; Dave Day 76'	(Report)		Stadium: Cove Road Stadium

== Second round ==
July 2, 2006	North York Astros (CSL)	0–5	Brampton Stallions (CSL)	Toronto Ontario
2:30 ET		(Report)	André Andrade 48'; Ronald Nicholas 50'; Helio Pereira 65'; Helio Pereira 67'; Helio Pereira 79'	Stadium: Esther Shiner Stadium; Attendance: 30; Referee: Geoff Gamble

July 2, 2006	Laval Dynamites (CSL)	2–4	Ottawa St. Anthony Italia (OCSL)	Laval, Quebec
7:00 ET	Leo Incollingo; Mourad Bellari	(Report)	Souleyman Gagou; Danny Jones; Urbain Some; Abraham Osman	Stadium: Centre Sportif Bois-de-Boulogne

July 2, 2006	Italia Shooters (CSL)	2–0	Oakville Blue Devils (CSL)	Vaughan, Ontario
7:00 ET	Joshua Jaramillo 70'; Danny Sanna 88'	(Report)		Stadium: The Soccer Centre; Attendance: 80; Referee: Mercy Watfa

July 2, 2006	St. Catharines Wolves (CSL)	0–1	AEK London (WOSL)	St. Catharines, Ontario
8:00 ET		(Report)	Haris Cekic 67'	Stadium: Club Roma Stadium

July 2, 2006	Hamilton Serbians (OSL)	3–2	Toronto Supra Portuguese (CSL)	Hamilton, Ontario
9:00 ET	Dragorad Milicevic 35'; Dragorad Milicevic 40'; Dragorad Milicevic 70'	(Report)	Giovani Annisi 23'; Giovani Annisi 80'	Stadium: Brian Timmis Stadium

July 3, 2006	London City (CSL)	4–1	Caribbean Selects (CSL)	London, Ontario
8:38 ET	Marco Peeters 16'; Michel Daoust 19'; Johan Wikman 39'; Bruno Mota 89'	(Report)	Ajani Stapleton 70'	Stadium: Cove Road Stadium

July 14, 2006	Serbian White Eagles (CSL)	2–2 (a.e.t.) (3–4 p)	Toronto Lynx (USL)	Toronto, Ontario
7:30 ET	Nikola Budalic 23'; Bozo Milic 61'	(Report)	Jamie Dodds 66'; Jamie Dodds 88'	Stadium: Centennial Park Stadium; Attendance: 1, 511; Referee: Joe Fletcher (Ontario)
	Penalties
	Nikola Budalic (penalty scored); Sinisa Ninkovic (penalty scored); Bozo Milic (penalty scored); Gabriel Pop (penalty missed); Sasa Viciknez (penalty missed); Mario Ostojic (penalty missed)		Jamie Dodds (penalty scored); Damien Pottinger (penalty missed); Kevin Jeffrey (penalty scored); Cameron Medwin (penalty scored); Edgar Bartolomeu (penalty missed); Jeremy Shepherd (penalty scored)

== Quarter-final ==
August 4, 2006	London City (CSL)	1–2	AEK London (WOSL)	London, Ontario
8:38 ET	Bruno Mota 71'	(Report)	Haris Cekic 15'; Martin Painter 23'	Stadium: Cove Road Stadium

August 6, 2006	Ottawa St. Anthony Italia (OCSL)	1–0	Windsor Border Stars (CSL)	Carp, Ontario
3:00 ET	Urbain Some 18'	(Report)		Stadium: OZ Optics Stadium

August 7, 2006	Italia Shooters (CSL)	0–1	Brampton Stallions (CSL)	Vaughan, Ontario
7:00 ET		(Report)	Hugo Herrera 6'	Stadium: The Soccer Centre; Attendance: 120; Referee: Mercy Watfa (Ontario)

August 13, 2006	Hamilton Serbians (OSL)	0–1	Toronto Lynx (USL)	Hamilton, Ontario
5:00 ET		(Report)	Matthew Palleschi 81'	Stadium: Brian Timmis Stadium; Attendance: 400; Referee: Vito Curalli (Ontario)

== Wild Card Game ==
September 3, 2006	London City (CSL)	1–3	Ottawa St. Anthony Italia (OCSL)	London, Ontario
7:38 ET	Marco Peeters 79'	(Report)	Urbain Some 11'; Souleymane Gagou 28'; Christian Hoefler 50'	Stadium: Cove Road Stadium

== Semi-final ==
September 1, 2006	London AEK (WOSL)	0–1	Toronto Lynx (USL)	London, Ontario
8:38 ET		(Report)	Osni Neto 17'	Stadium: Cove Road Stadium; Attendance: 500; Referee: Silviu Petrescu (Ontario)

September 4, 2006	Brampton Stallions (CSL)	1–3	Ottawa St. Anthony Italia (OCSL)	London, Ontario
4:08 ET	Hugo Herrera 50'	(Report)	Ladislas Kikunda 28'; Abraham Osman 32'; Alain Njima 74'	Stadium: Cove Road Stadium

== Final ==
September 24
5:00 ET

Toronto Lynx	0–2	Ottawa St. Anthony Italia
	Report	Abraham Osman 55'; Abraham Osman 81'

Esther Shiner Stadium, Toronto, Ontario
Attendance: 200
Referee: Joe Fletcher (Ontario)

GK	28	(Canada) Chris Baker
RB	17	(Canada) Chris Williams
CB	6	(Canada) Andres Arango
LB	3	(Trinidad and Tobago) Rick Titus
RM	23	(Canada) Gordon Chin	(substituted off) 89'
CM	4	(Canada) Joe Mattacchione (c)	(substituted off) 85'
CM	9	(Canada) David Diplacido
CM	27	(Angola) Edgar Bartolomeu	(substituted off) 64'
LM	12	(Canada) Marko Bedenikovic	(substituted off) 46'
ST	2	(Canada) Damien Pottinger	(substituted off) 85'
ST	15	(Canada) Matthew Palleschi	(substituted off) 89'
Substitutes:
DF	46	(Canada) Anthony Doran	(substituted on) 89'
DF	14	(Canada) Cameron Medwin	(substituted on) 46'
MF	21	(Brazil) Osni Neto	(substituted on) 64'
DF	32	(England) Aaron Steele	(substituted on) 85'
MF	29	(Canada) Steve Lumley	(substituted on) 85'
MW	74	(Canada) Mackenzie Wilde	(substituted on) 89'
Manager:
(England) Duncan Wilde

GK	0	(Canada) Angus Wong
RB	6	(Canada) Simon Bonk
CB	3	(Canada) Kwame Telemaque
LB	16	(Canada) Kwesi Loney
RM	20	(Canada) Marcelo Plada
CM	8	(Canada) Richard Furano
CM	19	(Burkina Faso) Urbain Some (c)
CM	4	(Democratic Republic of the Congo) Ladislas Bushiri	(substituted off) 82'
LM	7	(Canada) Christian Hoefler
CF	9	(Uganda) Abraham Osman
CF	11	(Ivory Coast) Souleyman Gagou	(substituted off) 86'
Substitutes:
GK	1	(Canada) Scott Millique
DF	5	(Canada) Alessandro Battisi	(substituted on) 82'
ST	12	(Canada) Edgar Soglo
MF	18	(Canada) Claudio Venegas
MF	21	(Canada) Allan Popazzi
ST	10	(Canada) Johnny Schleda	(substituted on) 86'
Manager:
(Canada) Aldo Popazzi

Assistant referees:
Vito Currali
Geoff Gamble
Fourth official:
Kyle McIntosh

== Top scorers ==
Position	Player	Club	Goals
1	Abraham Osman	Ottawa St. Anthony Italia	3
	Dragorad Milicevic	Hamilton Serbians	3
	Haris Cekic	AEK London	3
	Helio Pereira	Brampton Stallions	3
	Urbain Some	Ottawa St. Anthony Italia	3
2	Hugo Herrera	Brampton Stallions	2
	Jamie Dodds	Toronto Lynx	2
	Souleyman Gagou	Ottawa St. Anthony Italia	2
