= Adjetey =

Adjetey is a surname. Notable people with the surname include:

- Cornelius Francis Adjetey, Ghanaian ex-serviceman shot dead in the 1948 Accra riots
- Emmanuel Adjetey, Ghanaian footballer
- Eric Adjetey Anang, Ghanaian sculptor and fantasy coffin carpenter
- Jamie Adjetey-Nelson, Canadian athlete
- Jonas Adjetey, Ghanaian footballer
- Laryea Adjetey, Ghanaian footballer
- Peter Ala Adjetey, Ghanaian politician and lawyer
- Seth Ago-Adjetey, Ghanaian accountant and civil servant
- Victoria Adjetey, Ghanaian politician

== See also ==
- Adjetey Anang, Ghanaian actor
