= Konata Mannings =

Guyanese footballer (born 1986)

Natta Mannings
Personal information
- Full name: Konata Mannings
- Date of birth: 20 March 1986 (age 40)
- Place of birth: Georgetown, Guyana
- Height: 1.79 m (5 ft 10 in)
- Positions: Attacking midfielder; striker

Team information
- Current team: Alpha United FC

Youth career
- Pele FC

Senior career*
Years	Team	Apps	(Gls)
2004–2014	Pele FC	113	(65)
2007	→ Italia Shooters (loan)	5	(0)
2008	→ Caledonia AIA (loan)	15	(5)
2009	→ North York Astros (loan)	3	(0)
2015–	Alpha United FC		

International career
2003–2008	Guyana Youth	20	(6)
2008–	Guyana Futsal	27	(9)
2005–	Guyana	27	(2)
- * Club domestic league appearances and goals

Konata Mannings (20 March 1986 in Georgetown) is a Guyanese international football player who plays with Alpha United FC.

== Career ==
Mannings began his professional career in 2004 for Pele FC in the GFF National Super League. He was loaned in 2007 to Italia Shooters of the Canadian Soccer League. He made his debut in a 4-0 victory in North York on 20 May 2007.

The following year he played with Caledonia AIA. During the 2008 TT Pro League season Mannings led Caledonia to finish third in the standings and helped them qualify for the Lucozade Sport Big Six. On 27 May 2009 the North York Astros head coach Uğur Çimen announced the signing of Mannings for the 2009 season. He made his debut for the Astros in a 2-0 defeat to St. Catharines on 3 June 2009. Mannings signed with G.S United Soccer club in 2013 in the Ontario Soccer League. He returned to play with Pele FC in 2014, and was loaned in 2015 to Alpha United FC. Mannings was top scorer for Pele in the Kashif & Shanghai Cup 2015.

== International career ==
Mannings scored his goal for Guyana on 27 January 2008 in a 2-2 tie against Saint Vincent and the Grenadines. He was selected represent Guyana at the 2008 Caribbean Championship, and was in the starting 11 for the first two games against Dominica and Suriname. He is a former Under-15, -17, -20, -21 and -23 levels team player, who scored six goals in twenty games. He played with the U-21 the Central American Qualifying for 2005 FIFA World Youth Championship and played Futsal for Guyana.

== Personal life ==
His father Keith "Sanjee" Mannings has previously served as his player agent and his mother Roxanne Keith works as housewife. His brother is the former Guyana national under-17 footballer and now Toronto based Reggae singer Matussala Mandela Mannings.
