= Helinho (footballer, born 1980) =

Brazilian footballer

Personal information
- Full name: Helio Paes Pereira Junior
- Date of birth: 27 December 1980 (age 45)
- Place of birth: Castanhal, Brazil
- Height: 1.63 m (5 ft 4 in)
- Position: Midfielder

Senior career*
Years	Team	Apps	(Gls)
2000–2002	Castanhal Esporte Clube		
2003	Remo	9	(1)
2003–2004	Coritiba	14	(1)
2005	Clube Municipal Ananindeua	14	(7)
2006	Unión Huaral	3	(0)
2006	Toronto Lynx	2	(0)
2006	Brampton Stallions	8	(5)
2007–2008	Portuguese Supra	25	(12)
2009	Millonarios Fútbol Club	7	(4)
2010	Castanhal Esporte Clube		
- * Club domestic league appearances and goals as of 16 November 2014

Helio Paes Pereira Junior (born 27 February 1980, in Castanhal), known as Helinho is a Brazilian former footballer who played in several Brazilian state leagues, Peruvian Primera División, USL First Division, Canadian Soccer League, and Categoría Primera A.

== Playing career ==
Helinho began playing at the local level with his hometown team Castanhal Esporte Clube. He had stints with Coritiba, Clube Municipal Ananindeua, Clube do Remo, and played in Peru with Unión Huaral. In 2004, Helinho went abroad to Canada to sign with the Toronto Lynx of the USL First Division. His signing was announced in a press conference where the Lynx introduced two more signings from Brazil. He made his debut on May 26, 2006, against Miami FC coming on as a substitute for Osni Neto. Helinho would only make one appearance and was subsequently deemed surplus. In order to make room for new additional signings, Helinho's contract was bought out by the Brampton Stallions of the Canadian Soccer League.

Helinho made his debut on June 25, 2006, against London City, where he recorded his first goal of the season in a 6–0 thrashing over City at home. Helinho would further contribute to the Stallions by scoring another goal in 6–0 victory over the Caribbean Selects. He had a relatively successful tenure with Brampton, where he led that Stallions to five game undefeated streak and finished off the season with five goals. He helped the Brampton side clinch a playoff spot by finishing second in the National Division. The following season, he signed with the Portuguese Supra where he finished as the club's leading scorer with 9 goals. In 2009, he returned to South America to sign with Millonarios Fútbol Club, and in 2010 he returned to Brazil to play with his former club Castanhal Esporte Clube.

== Honours ==
=== Player ===
Clube do Remo

- Pará State Championship: 1

2003
