= Laryea (given name) =

Laryea is a given name. Notable people with the given name include:

- Laryea Adjetey (born 1973), Ghanaian footballer
- Laryea Kingston (born 1980), Ghanaian footballer

== See also ==
- Laryea, surname
