= Anthony Adur =

Canadian soccer player (born 1988)

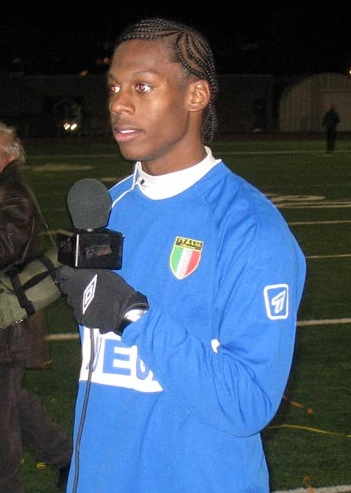
- Adur in 2006

Personal information
- Full name: Anthony Christopher Bahadur
- Date of birth: February 25, 1988 (age 38)
- Place of birth: Toronto, Ontario, Canada
- Height: 6 ft 1 in (1.85 m)
- Position: Striker

Youth career
- 2005–2007: St. Elizabeth Catholic High School
- 2006: Cruz Azul Shooters

College career
Years	Team	Apps	(Gls)
2008	Blue Raiders		

Senior career*
Years	Team	Apps	(Gls)
2006	Italia Shooters	5	(3)
2008	Toronto Lynx	11	(1)
2008	North York Astros		
2009	Sengkang Punggol	21	(5)
2010	Maccabi Haifa		
2010–2012	TOT		
2013	Zanesville Athletic FC		
2013–2014	FC Edmonton	8	(0)
2016	York Region Shooters	8	(2)
- * Club domestic league appearances and goals

Anthony Christopher Bahadur or Anthony Adur (born February 25, 1988) is a former Canadian professional soccer player who played as a forward.

== Youth career ==
Adur played soccer at the high school level while enrolled in St. Elizabeth Catholic High School. In his high school senior year in 2007, he helped the team produce an undefeated regular season. He received the team's MVP award twice throughout his tenure at St. Elizabeth.

In 2006, he began playing in the Ontario Soccer League the province's top amateur circuit with Cruz Azul Shooters. He played in the league's Provincial East U21 division and was named the MVP.

Adur played college soccer in 2008 with Lindsey Wilson College.

== Club career ==
=== Early career ===
While playing with Cruz Azul Shooters, he was called up by the club's parent team, the Italia Shooters in the Canadian Soccer League. In his debut season in the Southern Ontario circuit, he assisted Italia in securing a playoff berth by finishing third in their division. The Italians qualified for the championship final after defeating Toronto Croatia in the playoff semifinal round. Adur played in the championship match; he scored the winning goal against the Serbian White Eagles.

In the college offseason, he played in the American-based USL Premier Development League with the Toronto Lynx in the summer of 2008. In total, he played in 11 matches and recorded 1 goal. After the conclusion of the PDL season, he returned to the CSL circuit to sign with the North York Astros. He helped the club clinch a postseason berth.

=== Asia ===
In the winter of 2009, Adur was part of a team assembled by Rafael Carbajal that played in a friendly match in Singapore. Shortly after, on February 3, 2009, he received a contract from Sengkang Punggol of the Singaporean S. League.

After a year in Singapore, he signed with Maccabi Haifa in Israel but was released six months later. He then moved to Thailand to sign with TOT S.C. where he spent two seasons. Following his time in Asia, he was linked with a move to the Egyptian side Ismaily SC, but because of the civil unrest throughout the country, he left.

=== North America ===
In 2012, he returned to the North American continent where he trained with MLS side Columbus Crew during his free agency. While in the United States, he played in the National Premier Soccer League in 2013 with Zanesville Athletic.

In the fall of 2013, he received a trial with FC Edmonton of the North American Soccer League. Following his successful trial, he officially secured a contract with Edmonton on August 1, 2013. He debuted for Edmonton on August 11, 2013, against the San Antonio Scorpions. Adur left Edmonton once the season was finished. In Edmonton, he played in 8 matches.

In 2016, he returned to play with his former club, the Shooters, renamed York Region Shooters. Adur recorded his first goal of the season on August 28, 2016, against FC Ukraine United. Throughout the season, he appeared in 8 matches and recorded 2 goals. He helped York Region secure the league's first division title. In the preliminary round of the postseason, he contributed a goal in a 5–0 victory over Milton SC. Their playoff journey concluded after a 4–1 defeat in a penalty shootout to Hamilton City.

In 2021, he returned to the Ontario Soccer League to play with GS United.

== International career ==
In 2012, Adur entertained the option of representing the Trinidad and Tobago national football team in the country of his father's birth.

== Honours ==
Italia/York Region Shooters

- CSL Championship: 2006
- Canadian Soccer League First Division: 2016

Individual

- Ontario Soccer League Provincial East U21 MVP: 2006
