= Bushiri (surname) =

Bushiri is an African surname. Notable people with the surname include:

- Ladislas Bushiri (born 1986), Congolese-Canadian soccer player
- Rocky Bushiri (born 1999), Belgian football player
- Shepherd Bushiri (born 1983), Malawian Christian preacher, motivational speaker, author, and businessman
