= Ivan Jurisic =

Ivan Jurisic may refer to:

- Ivan Jurišić (footballer, born 1956)
- Ivan Jurisic (footballer, born 1970s)
