= Luca Centurione =

Italian former footballer

Personal information
- Full name: Luca Centurione
- Place of birth: Lanciano, Italy
- Position: Midfielder

Senior career*
Years	Team	Apps	(Gls)
1996	Toronto Italia	4	(2)
1997–1998	Toronto Lynx	16	(1)
2002–2003	Brampton Hitmen	22	(1)
- * Club domestic league appearances and goals

Luca Centurione is an Italian former footballer who played the majority of his career in North America.

== Playing career ==
Centurione began his career with Toronto Italia of the Canadian National Soccer League in 1996. He made his debut on June 23, 1996 against the Toronto Supra in a 1-1 draw. A week after he recorded his first two goals for the club on June 30, 1996 in a match against Oakville Canadian Westerns in 3-1 victory. The following season, he added a Treble to his resume by winning the Umbro Cup along with Playoff Championship. He managed to achieve an undefeated season with Toronto along with their treble victory. In 1997, Centurione signed with expansion franchise the Toronto Lynx of the USL A-League, where he was re-united with his old Toronto Italia head coach Peter Pinizzotto. His signing was in April 1997 in a press conference which revealed the club's roster for the 1997 season. He made his debut for the club on April 12, 1997 in a match against the Jacksonville Cyclones which resulted in 3-1 defeat during the match he received a red card. Centurione assisted the club in qualifying for the post season for the first time in the franchise's history, by finishing 4th in the Northeastern division. The Lynx were eliminated in the first round of the playoffs against the Montreal Impact. He returned to the Lynx the following year where he appeared in 4 matches, but failed to make the post season by finishing second last in their division.

In 2002, Centurione signed with the Brampton Hitmen of the Canadian Professional Soccer League. He made his debut for the club on August 22, 2002 in 1-0 defeat to the Metro Lions. He scored his first goal for Brampton on October 6, 2002 in a match against North York Astros. He featured in 6 matches for the Hitmen, but the club failed to reach the postseason by finishing sixth in the standings of the Western Conference. He returned to Brampton the following year and his signing was announced on June 6, 2003. He featured in the majority of the season for Brampton, but did not appear in the postseason matches where the Hitmen claimed the CPSL Championship.
