= Akmadžić =

Akmadžić is a surname. Notable people with the surname include:

- Mile Akmadžić (born 1939), Prime Minister of the Republic of Bosnia and Herzegovina
- Milodrag Akmadžić, Croatian footballer
