= 2006 Canadian Soccer League season =

Canadian Soccer League
- Season: 2006
- Champions: Italia Shooters
- Regular Season title: Serbian White Eagles (International Division); Oakville Blue Devils (National Division)
- Matches: 132
- Goals: 443 (3.36 per match)
- Top goalscorer: Gabriel Pop (Serbian White Eagles) (27)
- Best goalkeeper: George Azcurra
- Biggest home win: 9–0 Toronto Supra Portuguese v Caribbean Selects
- Biggest away win: 0–8 St. Catharines Wolves v Serbian White Eagles

The 2006 Canadian Soccer League season was the 9th season for the Canadian Soccer League. The season began on May 19, 2006, and concluded on October 15, 2006, with Italia Shooters defeating Serbian White Eagles, 1–0, at Esther Shiner Stadium to win their first CSL Championship. In the regular season Serbia clinched the International Division, and Oakville Blue Devils secured their first National Division title. The league was re-branded as the Canadian Soccer League, and renamed their two existing conferences into the International and National division. The changes brought about an increase in sponsorship, media coverage, and a 50% increase in attendance. The CSL also received greater autonomy from the Ontario Soccer Association. The league struck an agreement with the Toronto Community News which provided coverage for the league and its member clubs through their nine community newspapers.

== Changes from 2005 season ==
The Canadian Professional Soccer League changed their name to the Canadian Soccer League. Two new conferences were created International, and National, replacing the Eastern, and Western conferences. The Vaughan Shooters changed their name to Italia Shooters and Toronto Supra changed their name to Toronto Supra Portuguese. Both joined the newly created international division, re-kindling the spirit of the National Soccer League. The Serbian White Eagles, and the Caribbean Selects began play as an expansion franchise in the International Conference. The White Eagles played under the same name in the CSL's predecessor league the National Soccer League in 1974. The Hamilton Thunder, and the Durham Storm had their franchises revoked. Most of the matches were scheduled for the weekend in order to save travel expenses for the clubs, and the league eliminated the playoff wildcard match for the host club.

== Teams ==
Team	City	Stadium	Manager
Brampton Stallions	Brampton, Ontario (Bramalea)	Victoria Park Stadium	Paul Dhillon
Caribbean Selects	Toronto, Ontario (Liberty Village)	Lamport Stadium	Corcel Blair Jr.
Italia Shooters	Vaughan, Ontario (Woodbridge)	Ontario Soccer Centre	Carmine Isacco
London City	London, Ontario (Westmount)	Cove Road Stadium	Harry Gauss
Laval Dynamites	Laval, Quebec	Centre Sportif Bois-de-Boulogne	Jawad El Andaloussi
North York Astros	Toronto, Ontario (North York)	Esther Shiner Stadium	Pavel Zaslavski
Oakville Blue Devils	Oakville, Ontario (Bronte)	Bronte Stadium	Phil Ionadi
Serbian White Eagles	Toronto, Ontario (Etobicoke)	Centennial Park Stadium	Dragoslav Šekularac
St. Catharines Wolves	St. Catharines, Ontario (Vansickle)	Club Roma Stadium	Miro Marjanovic
Toronto Croatia	Mississauga, Ontario (Streetsville)	Memorial Park	Mladen Pralija
Toronto Supra Portuguese	Toronto, Ontario (Brockton)	Brockton Stadium	Jose Testas
Windsor Border Stars	Windsor, Ontario	Windsor Stadium	Pat Hilton

Location of CSL teams outside of Toronto for the 2006 CSL season.
National Division International Division
Location of CSL teams in Toronto for the 2006 CSL season.
National Division International Division

== Final standings ==
=== International Division ===
Pos	Team	Pld	W	D	L	GF	GA	GD	Pts	Qualification
1	Serbian White Eagles (A, C)	22	17	4	1	66	13	+53	55	Qualification for Playoffs
2	Toronto Croatia (A)	22	14	5	3	58	23	+35	47	Qualification for Playoffs
3	Italia Shooters (A, O)	22	8	9	5	30	26	+4	33	Qualification for Playoffs
4	Toronto Supra Portuguese (A)	22	7	7	8	43	34	+9	28	Qualification for Playoffs
5	Caribbean Selects	22	1	3	18	15	87	−72	6	

Updated to match(es) played on September 30, 2006. Source: http://www.rocketrobinsoccerintoronto.com/reports06/06cpwk20.htm
Rules for classification: 1) points; 2) goal difference; 3) number of goals scored.
(A) Advance to a further round; (C) Champions; (O) Play-off winners

=== National Division ===
Pos	Team	Pld	W	D	L	GF	GA	GD	Pts	Qualification
1	Oakville Blue Devils (A, C)	22	10	6	6	42	26	+16	36	Qualification for Playoffs
2	Brampton Stallions (A)	22	10	5	7	38	42	−4	35	Qualification for Playoffs
3	Laval Dynamites (A)	22	8	7	7	37	29	+8	31	Qualification for Playoffs
4	Windsor Border Stars (A)	22	8	6	8	30	30	0	30	Qualification for Playoffs
5	St. Catharines Wolves	22	7	6	9	29	40	−11	27	
6	North York Astros	22	3	8	11	28	45	−17	17	
7	London City	22	3	6	13	27	58	−31	15	

Updated to match(es) played on September 30, 2006. Source: http://www.rocketrobinsoccerintoronto.com/reports06/06cpwk20.htm
Rules for classification: 1) points; 2) goal difference; 3) number of goals scored.
(A) Advance to a further round; (C) Champions

== CSL Championship playoffs ==
QuarterFinals
3	Toronto Croatia	1
6	Laval Dynamites	0
2	Oakville Blue Devils	1
7	Windsor Border Stars	2
4	Brampton Stallions	0
5	Italia Shooters	2
1	Serbian White Eagles	3
8	Toronto Supra Portuguese	0

SemiFinals
3	Toronto Croatia	0
5	Italia Shooters	1
1	Serbian White Eagles	6
7	Windsor Border Stars	1

Rogers Cup final
5	Italia Shooters	1
1	Serbian White Eagles	0

=== Quarterfinals ===
October 1, 2006	Toronto Croatia	1–0	Laval Dynamites	Brampton, Ontario
1:30 ET	Tommy Ples 52'	(Report)		Stadium: Victoria Park Stadium; Attendance: 150; Referee: Steven DePiero (Ontario)

October 1, 2006	Oakville Blue Devils	1–2	Windsor Border Stars	Oakville, Ontario
3:30 ET	Pedro Czoli 5'	(Report)	Sampson 16'; Wil Kletzien 45'	Stadium: Bronte Stadium

October 1, 2006	Brampton Stallions	Cancelled (Note: Italia Shooters were given the semi-final spot as a result of a 2-0 forfeit)	Italia Shooters	Brampton, Ontario
6:00 ET		(Report) [ (Report)]		Stadium: Victoria Park Stadium

October 2, 2006	Serbian White Eagles	3–0	Toronto Supra Portuguese	Toronto, Ontario
8:00 ET	Viciknez 53', 89'; Alex Braletic 91'	(Report)		Stadium: Centennial Park Stadium; Attendance: 1200; Referee: Andrew Kravets (Ontario)

=== Semifinals ===
October 7, 2006	Toronto Croatia	0–1	Italia Shooters	Toronto, Ontario
1:00 ET		(Report)	Jason DeThomasis 83'	Stadium: Esther Shiner Stadium; Attendance: 300; Referee: Silviu Petrescu (Ontario)

October 7, 2006	Serbian White Eagles	6–1	Windsor Border Stars	Toronto, Ontario
5:00 ET	Gabriel Pop 29'; Milos Scepanovic 34'; Gabriel Pop 36'; Gabriel Pop 49'; Gabriel Pop 61'; Joshua Gordon 81'	(Report)	Ablaye Abdulla 68'	Stadium: Esther Shiner Stadium; Attendance: 1000; Referee: Vito Curalli (Ontario)

=== CSL Championship ===
October 15
5:00 ET

Serbian White Eagles	0–1	Italia Shooters
	Report	Anthony Adur 62'

Esther Shiner Stadium, Toronto, Ontario
Attendance: 2000
Referee: Mercy Watfa (Ontario)

GK	23	(Serbia) Dušan Belić
RB	2	(Serbia) Siniša Ninković
CB	8	(Serbia) Nenad Stojčić
LB	6	(Serbia) Mirko Medić
RM	16	(Canada) Joshua Gordon
CM	10	(Montenegro) Božo Milić	(substituted off) 82'
CM	13	(Canada) Nikola Budalic	(substituted off) 76'
LM	21	(Canada) Alex Braletic
ST	11	(Romania) Gabriel Pop
ST	9	(Serbia) Saša Viciknez (c)
ST	15	(Canada) Miloš Šćepanović	(substituted off) 45'
Substitutes:
GK	1	(Serbia) Miodrag Bogdanović
DF	4	(Canada) Marc Jankovic
DF	5	(Serbia) Nikola Lukić
DF	7	(Serbia) Mario Ostojić
MF	12	(Serbia) Uroš Predić	(substituted on) 82'
MF	20	(Serbia) Milan Janošević	(substituted on) 76'
FW	22	(Montenegro) Dragan Radović	(substituted on) 45'
Manager:
(Serbia) Dragoslav Šekularac

GK	0	Camilo Benzi
RB	22	(Canada) Angelo Pollastrone (c)
CB	12	(Canada) Alvaro Yaques
LB	11	(Canada) Fitzroy Christey
RM	15	Luke Stedmond	(substituted off) 57'
CM	24	(Canada) Anthony Adur
CM	13	(Canada) Frank Bruno	(substituted off) 82'
CM	18	Bill Androutsos	(substituted off) 65'
LM	25	(Canada) Sean Myers
FW	21	(Canada) Luca Forno
FW	9	(Canada) Jason De Thomasis	(substituted off) 84'
Substitutes:
GK	1	Pablo Alvarado
DF	6	(Canada) Franco Ruscetta	(substituted on) 65'
DF	3	Diego Cardona
MF	10	Josue Jaramillo	(substituted on) 57'
FW	14	Remone Metyas
FW	20	Rob Black	(substituted on) 84'
FW	23	Aundrae Rollins	(substituted on) 82'
Manager:
(Italy) Tony De Thomasis

Assistant referees:
Amato DeLuca
Vito Curalli
Fourth official:
Yusri Rudolf

== All-Star Game ==
Clyde F.C. of the Scottish First Division conducted a Canadian tour, where they played two matches the first match against Windsor Border Stars and the second against a CSL All-Star team assembled by Velemir Crljen. The match was played at Esther Shiner Stadium at North York, Toronto.

May 7, 2006
3:00 pm

CSL All-Stars	1 - 2	Clyde F.C.
Saša Viciknez 6'	Report	Dougie Imrie 18'; Stephen O'Donnell 55'

Esther Shiner Stadium, North York, Toronto
Attendance: 200
Referee: Steve DePiero (Ontario)

GK	23	(Canada) George Azcurra	(substituted off) 52'
RB	22	(Croatia) Antonijo Župan (c)
CB	25	(Canada) Orlin Chalmers	(substituted off) 66'
LB	4	(Croatia) Domagoj Šain
RM	12	(Canada) Danny Draganic	(substituted off) 31'
CM	17	(Canada) Desmond Humphrey	(substituted off) 79'
CM	16	(Saint Vincent and the Grenadines) Caswain Mason	(substituted off) 86'
CM	13	(Trinidad and Tobago) Hayden Fitzwilliams	(substituted off) 80'
LM	19	(Canada) Fitzroy Christey	(substituted off) 75'
ST	10	(Canada) Peter Curic	(substituted off) 70'
ST	18	(Serbia) Saša Viciknez	(substituted off) 66'
Substitutes:
GK	1	(Serbia) Dušan Belić	(substituted on) 79'
GK	21	(Canada) Haidar Al-Shaïbani	(substituted on) 52' (substituted off) 79'
DF	15	(Canada) Deny Velastegui	(substituted on) 75'
DF	2	(Serbia) Mirko Medić	(substituted on) 66'
DF	7	(Serbia) Mario Ostojić	(substituted on) 90'
DF	3	(Canada) Zeljko Dukic	(substituted on) 79'
MF	6	(Canada) Selmir Sehic	(substituted on) 31' (substituted off) 90'
MF	8	(Albania) Gentjan Dervishi
MF	11	(Albania) Eris Tafaj	(substituted on) 86'
MF	24	(Canada) Geoffrey Attard	(substituted on) 80'
FW	17	(Trinidad and Tobago) Judah Hernandez	(substituted on) 70'
FW	5	(Canada) Alex Braletic	(substituted on) 87'
FW	14	(Canada) Jean Tshimpaka	(substituted on) 66' (substituted off) 87'
Manager:
(Croatia) Velimir Crljen

GK	1	(Scotland) Peter Cherrie
RB	5	(Scotland) Craig McKeown
CB	2	(Scotland) Neil McGregor
CB	4	(Scotland) Chris Higgins	(substituted off) 74'
LB	3	(Scotland) Dougie Imrie
RM	11	(Northern Ireland) Michael McGowan
CM	6	(England) Kevin McDonald
CM	7	(Scotland) Steven Masterton	(substituted off) 45'
LM	8	(Scotland) Stephen O'Donnell
FW	10	(Scotland) Tom Brighton	(substituted off) 10'
FW	9	(Scotland) Alex Williams
Substitutes:
GK	17	(Scotland) Paul Jarvie
DF	12	(Scotland) Bob Harris
MF	15	(Scotland) Kevin Bradley	(substituted on) 10'
MF	16	(Scotland) Paul McHale	(substituted on) 45'
MF	19	(Scotland) Ian Sinclair	(substituted on) 74'
FW	14	(Scotland) Gary Arbuckle
Manager:
(England) Graham Roberts

Assistant referees:
Amato DeLuca
Mike Roecken
Fourth official:
Vito Curalli

== Top goal scorers ==
Rank	Player	Club	Goals
1	(Romania) Gabriel Pop	Serbian White Eagles	27
2	(Serbia) Saša Viciknez	Serbian White Eagles	23
3	(Brazil) Castro Uarlem	Toronto Supra Portuguese	20
4	(Trinidad and Tobago) Hayden Fitzwilliams	Toronto Croatia	12
5	(Canada) Tomislav Ples	Toronto Croatia	11
6	(Canada) Sam Hassam	Oakville Blue Devils	10
7	(Morocco) Rachid Madkour	Laval Dynamites	9
8	(Argentina) Hugo Herrera	Brampton Stallions	8
9	(Canada) Pedro Czoli	Oakville Blue Devils	8
10	(Canada) Micheal DiLuca	Toronto Supra Portuguese	8

== CSL Executive Committee and Staff ==
The 2006 CSL Executive Committee.

Position	Name	Nationality
Commissioner:	Cary Kaplan	(Canada) Canadian
Executive Director:	Stan Adamson	(England) English
Director of Discipline:	Clifford Dell	(Canada) Canadian
Director of Officials:	Walter Kirchner	(Romania) Romanian
Director of Marketing:	John Marsico	(Canada) Canadian
Office Manager:	Janet Leonard	(Canada) Canadian
Administration/PR:	Stephen McCaffrey	(Canada) Canadian
Referee-in-Chief:	Hugh Elliott	(Canada) Canadian
Community Services:	Peter Li Preti	(Canada) Canadian
Legal Counsel:	Ira Greenspoon	(Canada) Canadian
Financial Auditor:	John Morgan	(Canada) Canadian

== Awards ==
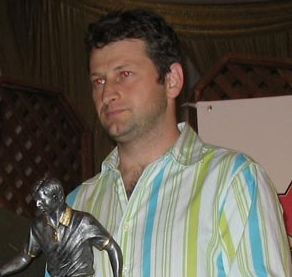
Gabriel Pop won the CSL Golden Boot

The annual CSL awards ceremony was held at the La Contessa Banquet Hall on October 22, 2006 in North York, Toronto. The majority of the awards were taken by the International Division teams. The league chose Sasa Viciknez as its MVP, a former Serbian football veteran who played in the 1998–99 UEFA Champions League. Romanian import Gabriel Pop took the Golden Boot for the White Eagles. The Goalkeeper of the Year went to George Azcurra of Toronto Croatia, which marked his fifth award a record amount.

Due to his longstanding dedication to the league Toronto Supra Portuguese owner Isac Cambas was given the President of the Year award. Supra's Uarlem Castro was named the Rookie of the Year after finishing as the third highest goalscorer in the league. After defying the odds in the championship final by defeating a team stacked with European football experience, Tony De Thomasis was presented with the Coach of the Year award. Expansion franchise Caribbean Selects were given the Fair Pay award, and Mercy Watfa was named the Referee of the Year.

Award	Player (Club)
CSL Most Valuable Player	Saša Viciknez (Serbian White Eagles)
CSL Golden Boot	Gabriel Pop (Serbian White Eagles)
CSL Goalkeeper of the Year Award	George Azcurra (Toronto Croatia)
CSL Defender of the Year Award	Fil Rocca (Windsor Border Stars)
CSL Rookie of the Year Award	Uarlem Castro (Toronto Supra Portuguese)
CSL Coach of the Year Award	Tony De Thomasis (Italia Shooters)
CSL President of the Year Award	Isac Cambas (Toronto Supra Portuguese)
CSL Referee of the Year Award	Mercy Watfa
CSL Fair Play Award	Caribbean Selects
