= Francisco Dos Santos =

Brazilian footballer (born 1974)

Personal information
- Full name: Francisco Enrique Crespo dos Santos
- Date of birth: 9 April 1974 (age 52)
- Place of birth: Rio de Janeiro, Brazil
- Height: 1.73 m (5 ft 8 in)
- Position: Forward

Senior career*
Years	Team	Apps	(Gls)
1994–1997	Botafogo		
1998	FC Kreuzlingen		
1999–2001	Toronto Lynx	56	(22)
2001	Brampton Hitmen	1	(1)
2000–2001	Toronto ThunderHawks (indoor)	2	(0)
2002	Toronto Supra	4	(0)
2003–2004	North York Astros	11	(7)
2005	Toronto Supra	6	(1)
2006	North York Astros	4	(3)
2007	Toronto Supra	6	(0)
- * Club domestic league appearances and goals

Francisco Enrique Crespo dos Santos (born 9 April 1974), known as Francisco Dos Santos or Batata, is a Brazilian former professional footballer who played as a forward, spending the majority of career with Canadian clubs in the Canadian Soccer League, and the Toronto Lynx of the USL A-League.

== Career ==
Dos Santos was born in Rio de Janeiro. He began his professional career in Brazil with Botafogo in 1994. In 1998, he went abroad to Switzerland with FC Kreuzlingen. After a season with Kreuzlingen he arrived in Canada to play in the USL A-League with the Toronto Lynx. In his first season with the club he led his team in scoring with 13 goals and was awarded the club's offensive player of the year award. The following year he repeated his success by once more leading the team in scoring with 9 goals and being named for the second consecutive year in a row the club's offensive player of the year.

He assisted the club by reaching the postseason the second time in the club's history. He contributed in the playoffs by scoring an equalizing goal in a 1–1 tie against the Rochester Rhinos. On 8 May 2001, the Toronto Lynx announced the re-signing of Dos Santos for the 2001 season. Unfortunately he had a disappointing season with the Lynx appearing only in 10 matches and having a scoring drought. It was reported in a press release on 13 July 2001, after having not scored a single goal in 10 matches, Dos Santos was released from his contract.

After his release from Toronto he signed a contract with the Brampton Hitmen, making his debut on 15 July 2001, in a match against the North York Astros where he recorded a goal in a 2–1 defeat. After only appearing in single match for the club he was released along with head coach Paul Kitson from their contracts. Dos Santos signed with the Toronto Supra of the Canadian Professional Soccer League for the 2002 season. He made his debut for the club in an Open Canada Cup match against the Toronto Croatia. In 2003, Dos Santos was transferred to the North York Astros. He made his debut for the club on 21 July 2003, in a match against the Mississauga Olympians and scored two goals in 3–1 victory. He had a tremendous season with the Astros scoring seven goals for the club. He would return to the Supra in 2005, and bring his career to a culmination with another run with North York, and Toronto.

Dos Santos also had a stint in the National Professional Soccer League with the short lived expansion franchise the Toronto ThunderHawks during the 2000–2001 winter indoor season. He helped the ThunderHawks reach the postseason by finishing second in the National Conference, and reached the Conference finals where they were defeated by the Milwaukee Wave.
