= Chris Love =

American soccer player

Personal information
- Full name: Christopher Love
- Place of birth: Columbia, Maryland, United States
- Position: Forward

College career
Years	Team	Apps	(Gls)
1989–1992	Hartford Hawks		

Senior career*
Years	Team	Apps	(Gls)
1994–1995	Baltimore Spirit (indoor)	12	(3)
1995	Hampton Roads Mariners		
1995–1996	Canton Invaders (indoor)	17	(4)
1996–1997	Charlotte Eagles		
1999	Maryland Mania	21	(1)

Managerial career
- 2000–2006: Howard Community College
- 2008: UMass Boston (assistant)
- * Club domestic league appearances and goals

Chris Love (born in Columbia, Maryland) is an American soccer forward who currently serves as an assistant coach at UMass Boston. He spent five years playing both indoor and outdoor soccer in the National Professional Soccer League and USISL.

== Player ==
Love attended the University of Hartford, playing on the men's soccer team from 1989 to 1992. He graduated in 1993 with a bachelor's degree in communications. In 1994, he signed with the Baltimore Spirit of the National Professional Soccer League (NPSL). He move to the Hampton Roads Mariners of the USISL in 1995. That fall, he moved to the Canton Invaders of the NPSL. He then played for Charlotte Eagles from 1996 to 1998. In 1999, Love played for the Maryland Mania of the USL A-League.

== Coach ==
In 2000, Love began his coaching career with Howard Community College. In 2008, he became an assistant coach with UMass Boston.
