= Go Nagaoka =

Japanese footballer (born 1984)

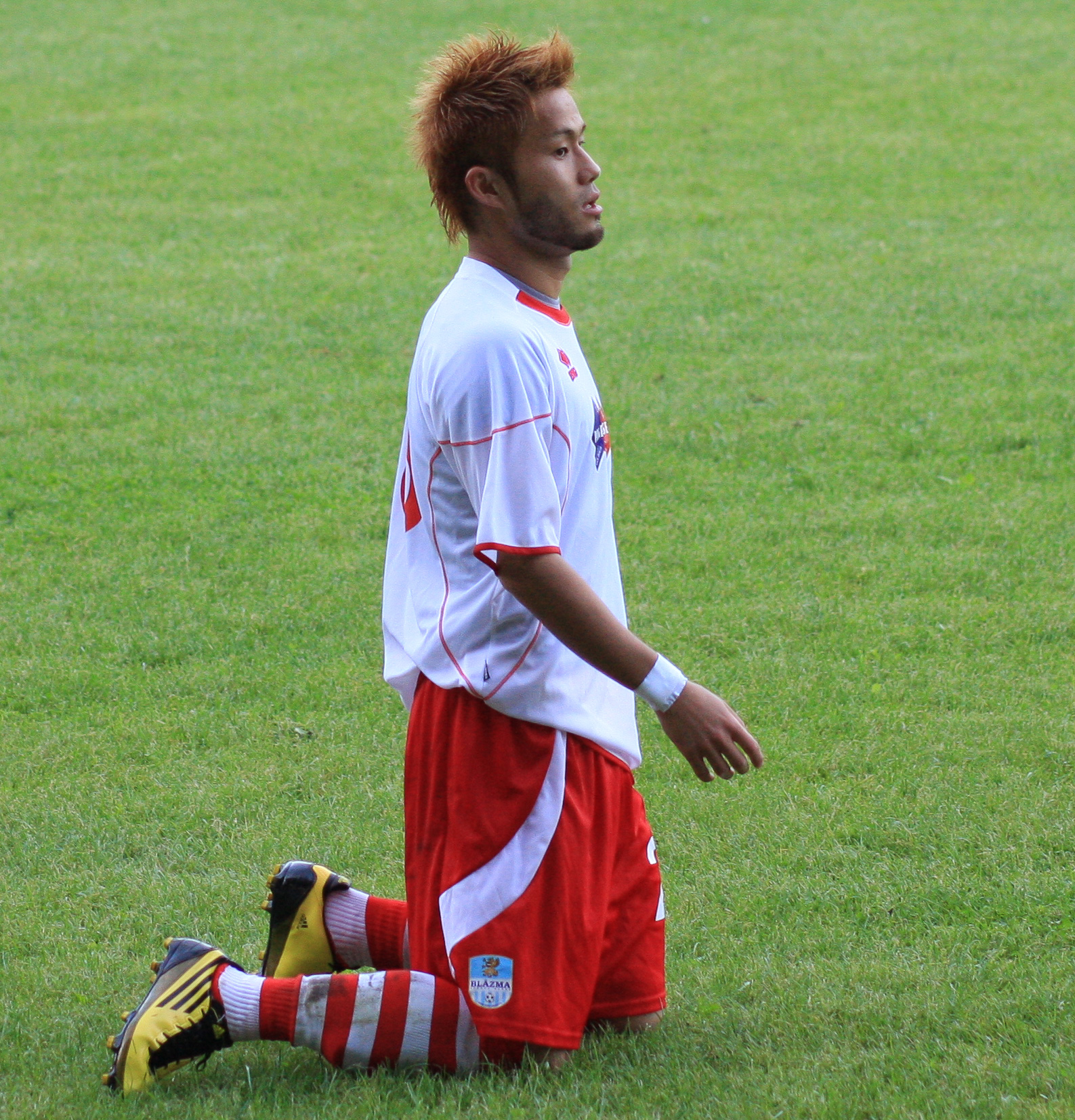
- Nagaoka in 2010

Personal information
- Date of birth: 23 May 1984 (age 42)
- Place of birth: Osaka, Japan
- Height: 1.72 m (5 ft 8 in)
- Position: Midfielder

Youth career
- Hokuyo Senior High School

Senior career*
Years	Team	Apps	(Gls)
- Londrina
- Avaí
- Carpenedolo
- Maisons Alfort
2008	North York Astros	21	(5)
2009–2010	Przebój Wolbrom	17	(1)
2010	SK Blāzma	14	(0)
2013–2014	Tarxien Rainbows	1	(0)
2014	AFA Olaine		
2014–2015	Mosta	0	(0)
2015–2016	Qormi	6	(0)
2017	Pembroke Athleta	6	(1)
2017–2018	Naxxar Lions	4	(0)
- * Club domestic league appearances and goals

Go Nagaoka (長岡 郷, Nagaoka Gō; born 23 May 1984) is a Japanese former professional footballer who played as a midfielder.

== Career ==
Born in Osaka, Nagaoka has played for Hokuyo Senior High School, Londrina, Avaí, Carpenedolo, Maisons Alfort, North York Astros, Przebój Wolbrom, SK Blāzma, Tarxien Rainbows, AFA Olaine, Mosta, Qormi, Pembroke Athleta and Naxxar Lions.
