= Éric Fanis =

Saint Lucian footballer

Personal information
- Full name: Éric Andre Fanis
- Date of birth: 30 December 1971 (age 54)
- Place of birth: Saint Lucia
- Position: Forward

Senior career*
Years	Team	Apps	(Gls)
1995–1997	Caribbean Stars		
1997–2001	Foresta Suceava	42 (Note: The statistics for the 1999–2000 Divizia B season are unavailable.)	(4)

International career
2000	Saint Lucia	1	(0)
- * Club domestic league appearances and goals

Éric Andre Fanis (born 30 December 1971) is a Saint Lucian former footballer who played as a forward. He made one appearance the Saint Lucia national team.

== Club career ==
Fanis had a stint with the Caribbean Stars in the Canadian International Soccer League in 1995. During his tenure with the Stars he won the 1996–97 CISL Indoor Championship. In 1997, he signed with Foresta Suceava in Romania, and appeared in 42 matches and recorded four goals for the club in Divizia A.

== International career ==
Fanis made his debut for the Saint Lucia national team on 5 March 2000 in the 2010 FIFA World Cup qualification – CONCACAF first round match against Suriname.
