= Laryea =

Laryea is a Ghanaian surname of the Ga language. Notable people with the surname include:

- Anyetei Laryea (born 1978), Ghanaian boxer
- Daniel Nii Laryea (born 1987), Ghanaian international football referee
- Emmanuel Nii Okai Laryea (born 1983), Ghanaian politician
- Frederick Daniel Laryea, Ghanaian diplomat
- Gabriel Laryea (1924–2009), Ghanaian sprinter
- Israel Laryea, Ghanaian journalist
- Joseph Laryea (born 1965), Ghanaian boxer
- Richie Laryea (born 1995), Canadian soccer player
- Wayne Laryea (born 1952), British musician and television actor

== See also ==
- Laryea (given name)
