= Patrick Tobo =

Cameroonian footballer (born 1962)

Personal information
- Full name: Patrick Omer Nyamsi Tobo
- Date of birth: 9 September 1962 (age 64)
- Place of birth: Cameroon
- Position: Defender

Senior career*
Years	Team	Apps	(Gls)
1976–1978	Nlonago Nkongsamba		
1979–1980	AS Ngoumou		
1980–1981	Lion Yaoundé		
1981–1982	Union Douala		
1982–1989	Canon Yaoundé		
1989–1991	Prévoyance CNPS		
1991–1992	Tonnerre Yaoundé		
1992–1994	Toronto Italia		
1994–1996	North York Astros		

International career
1981	Cameroon		

Managerial career
- 2011–: Canada U17
- * Club domestic league appearances and goals

Patrick Omer Nyamsi Tobo (born 9 September 1962) is a former Cameroonian professional footballer who played club football as a defender for clubs in Cameroon and Canada. He works as an assistant for the Canada men's national youth soccer teams.

== Club career ==
Born in Cameroon, Tobo began playing club football in the second division for Nlonago Nkongsamba and AS Ngoumou. From 1980 to 1992, he joined the first division sides with Lion de Yaoundé, Union Douala, Canon Yaoundé, Prévoyance CNPS and Tonnerre Yaoundé—winning a league and cup double with Canon in 1983 and a second cup with Prévoyance CNPS in 1989.

In 1992, Tobo moved to Canada where he played in the National Soccer League with Toronto Italia and North York Astros before retiring in 1996.

== Career as manager ==
After his retirement from playing football, Tobo studied to become a coach. He received a Canadian 'A' Licence and a UEFA 'A' Licence, and began working as a coach with Canada's youth national teams.

== International career ==
Tobo made appearances for the senior Cameroon national football team, including the 1981 Central African Games in Angola. He also played for Cameroon at the 1981 FIFA World Youth Championship finals in Australia.
