= Franco Lalli =

Canadian soccer player

Personal information
- Full name: Franco Lalli
- Date of birth: March 11, 1985 (age 41)
- Place of birth: Toronto, Ontario
- Height: 5 ft 8 in (1.73 m)
- Position: Midfielder

Youth career
- 1991–1995: Woodbridge Strikers
- 1995–1997: Woodbridge Town
- 1998–1999: Ontario Provincial team
- 2000: Toronto Lynx
- 2002: Foggia Calcio
- 2003: US Avellino

Senior career*
Years	Team	Apps	(Gls)
2004	S.S. Cavese 1919	0	(0)
2005	U.S.D. Lucera Calcio	0	(0)
2005–2006	Lombard-Pápa TFC	10	(0)
2008	North York Astros	21	(1)

International career
2005	Canada U-20	4	(0)
- * Club domestic league appearances and goals

Franco Lalli (born March 11, 1985) is a Canadian former soccer player who played as a midfielder.

== Youth career ==
Lalli started his soccer career at the youth level with the Woodbridge Strikers and the Ontario Provincial team. He also represented St. Joan of Arc Catholic High School's junior team. He also played with the Toronto Lynx juniors.

He represented the under-15 Ontario Provincial team in 2000. In the tournament, he helped Ontario win the gold medal against Quebec. He was also selected to the Ontario All-Star team. In 2001, while playing with Woodbridge's under-17 team, he was signed to AS Roma's youth team.

== Club career ==
=== 'Europe ===
He then pursued opportunities abroad in Italy, where he played for several clubs, namely Lucera Calcio, Foggia Calcio, Cavese 1919, US Avellino and Foggia Calcio. In 2005, he signed for Lombard-Pápa in the Hungarian Nemzeti Bajnokság I. He debuted for the club on March 18, 2006, against Kispest-Honvéd. In total, he played 10 matches. Once the season finished, the club released Lalli.

=== Canada ===
After several years in Europe, he played in the Canadian Soccer League with the North York Astros in 2008. He scored his first goal for the Astros on August 9 against the Brampton Lions. Throughout the season, Lalli helped secure a playoff berth by finishing second in the league's National Division. In the quarterfinal match, Lalli scored the Astros' only goal, forcing extra time, but the Serbian White Eagles scored the winning goal to advance to the semifinals.

== International career ==
Lalli appeared for Canada in the 2005 FIFA World Youth Championship, although he did not play in the tournament. In total, he made four appearances for the Canadian national U-20 team.
