= Dušan Belić =

Serbian footballer

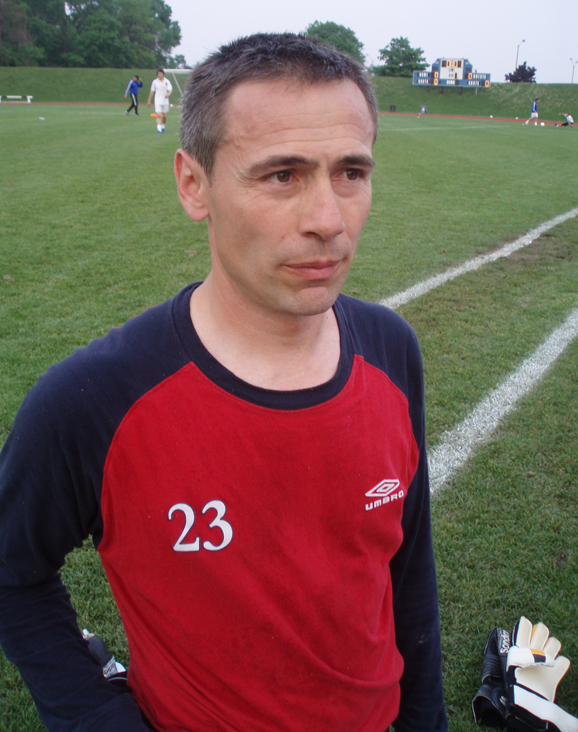
- Belić in 2007

Personal information
- Date of birth: 29 March 1971 (age 55)
- Place of birth: Pančevo, SFR Yugoslavia
- Height: 1.82 m (6 ft 0 in)
- Position: Goalkeeper

Youth career
- 1986–1988: PSK Pančevo

Senior career*
Years	Team	Apps	(Gls)
1988–1991	Dinamo Pančevo		
1991–1995	Hajduk Belgrade		
1995–1996	Dinamo Pančevo		
1997–2006	Sint-Truiden	224	(0)
2006–2007	Serbian White Eagles		

International career
1990–1991	Yugoslavia (futsal)		

Managerial career
- 2007: Serbian White Eagles (player-coach)
- * Club domestic league appearances and goals

Dušan Belić (Serbian Cyrillic: Душан Белић; born 29 March 1971) is a Serbian retired professional footballer who played as a goalkeeper and former head coach. He is currently the sporting director of FK Dinamo Pančevo.

== Playing career ==
=== Club career ===
Belić played for FK Hajduk Beograd, PSK Pančevo and FK Dinamo Pančevo. In 1997, he moved to Belgium where he would play for Sint-Truiden in the Belgian League for eight and a half years playing a total of 224 league matches. With the team, he reached the 2003 Belgian Cup Final.

In 2006, he moved to Canada where he played and captained the Serbian White Eagles FC under Dragoslav Šekularac. He made his debut on 19 May 2006 against Italia Shooters. In his debut season, he clinched the International Division title, and helped the team post the best defensive record. He featured in the championship final against Italia Shooters but his team fell short after a 1-0 defeat.

=== International career ===
Belić was a goalkeeper for the Yugoslavia national futsal team that qualified for the 1992 FIFA Futsal World Championship but Yugoslavia was banned from competing due to international sanctions.

== Post-playing career ==
Prior to the 2007 CSL season, Belić was named the player-coach for the Serbian White Eagles and Siniša Ninković was named the assistant coach. Midway through the season, Belić resigned from his position in order to accept a scouting position in Slovenia. Ninković was then promoted to head coach. In 2020, Belić was named the sporting director of Dinamo Pančevo.

== Personal life ==
Belić has three sons: Ognjen, Luka and Kristijan and he holds both Serbian and Belgian citizenship.

== Honours ==
=== Player ===
Serbian White Eagles

- Canadian Soccer League International Division: 2006
