= Platon Krivoshchyokov =

Russian footballer

Personal information
- Full name: Platon Viktorovich Krivoshchyokov
- Date of birth: 3 September 1968 (age 58)
- Place of birth: Novosibirsk, Russian SFSR
- Height: 1.88 m (6 ft 2 in)
- Positions: Midfielder; forward

Youth career
- FC Chkalovets Novosibirsk

Senior career*
Years	Team	Apps	(Gls)
1990	FC Kuzbass Kemerovo	2	(0)
1991–1992	FC Chkalovets Novosibirsk	48	(16)
1992	FC Dynamo Moscow	4	(0)
1995	FC Chkalovets Novosibirsk	26	(7)
1996–1997	FC Lokomotiv St. Petersburg	42	(4)
1997	FC Uralmash Yekaterinburg	8	(0)
1998	FC Chkalovets Novosibirsk	8	(1)
1999	Toronto Lynx	3	(0)
2000	North York Astros		
- * Club domestic league appearances and goals

Platon Viktorovich Krivoshchyokov (Russian: Платон Викторович Кривощёков; born 3 September 1968) is a former Russian professional footballer.

== Club career ==
He made his professional debut in the Soviet First League in 1990 for FC Kuzbass Kemerovo. In 1999, he played abroad in the USL A-League with Toronto Lynx. In his debut season in the Canadian top tier, he appeared in 3 matches. The following season he played in the Southern Ontario circuit the Canadian Professional Soccer League with North York Astros.

== Honours ==
- Russian Premier League bronze: 1992.
