= Edwin Ferdinand =

Saint Lucian footballer

Personal information
- Full name: Edwin Ferdinand-Lawrence
- Date of birth: 12 October 1971 (age 55)
- Place of birth: Saint Lucia
- Position: Forward

Senior career*
Years	Team	Apps	(Gls)
1995–1997	Caribbean Stars		
1999–2000	Northern United All Stars		

International career
2000	Saint Lucia	2	(0)
- * Club domestic league appearances and goals

Edwin Ferdinand (born 12 October 1971) is a Saint Lucian former footballer who played as a forward. He made two appearances for the Saint Lucia.

== Club career ==
Ferdinand spent some time with the Caribbean Stars in the Canadian International Soccer League from 1995. During this time, the team won the 1996–97 CISL Indoor Championship. In 1999, he signed with Northern United All Stars of the Saint Lucia Gold Division.

== International career ==
Ferdinand made his debut for the Saint Lucia national football team on 5 March 2000, in the 2010 FIFA World Cup qualification – CONCACAF first round match against Suriname.
