= Ángel Velázquez =

Mexican footballer (born 1984)

Personal information
- Full name: Ángel Velázquez Esquivel
- Date of birth: 18 July 1984 (age 42)
- Place of birth: Los Reyes Acaquilpan, Mexico
- Position: Midfielder

Senior career*
| Years | Team | Apps | (Gls) |
| 2003 | Cruz Azul | | |
| 2004 | Brampton Hitmen | 8 | (0) |
| 2005 | Oakville Blue Devils | | |
| 2006 | La Luz F.C. | | |
| 2007 | Boston River | | |
| 2008 | Querétaro F.C. | | |
| 2009–2010 | Alacranes de Durango | 7 | (0) |
- * Club domestic league appearances and goals

Ángel Velázquez Esquivel (born July 18, 1984, in Los Reyes Acaquilpan) is a former Mexican footballer who had stints in South America, Mexico, and the Canadian Professional Soccer League.

== Playing career ==
Velázquez began his professional career in his native country with Cruz Azul in 2003. In 2004, he was loaned to the Brampton Hitmen of the Canadian Professional Soccer League. He made his debut for the club on August 6, 2004, in a match against Toronto Croatia. He helped Brampton secure a playoff berth by finishing fourth in the Western Conference. He featured in the wildcard match against Toronto Croatia, but were defeated by a score of 3–1. The following season he signed with Oakville Blue Devils, and made his debut on June 5, 2005, in a match against Vaughan Shooters. Velázquez assisted the club in reaching the postseason by finishing second in the Western Conference. He reached the finals with the organization and faced Vaughan Shooters where Oakville won the CPSL Championship by a score of 2–1.

In 2006, he returned to South America to sign with Uruguayan side La Luz F.C., and with Boston River in 2007. Velázquez would return to Mexico to sign with Querétaro F.C., and finish off his career with Alacranes de Durango in the Ascenso MX.
