= Jamie Dodds =

Canadian former soccer player

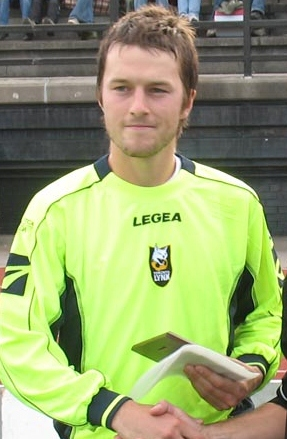
- Dodds in 2006

Personal information
- Full name: Jamie Dodds
- Date of birth: November 12, 1981 (age 44)
- Place of birth: Hamilton, Ontario, Canada
- Height: 1.83 m (6 ft 0 in)
- Position: Midfielder

Youth career
- 2001–2003: Robert Morris University

Senior career*
Years	Team	Apps	(Gls)
2004–2006	Toronto Lynx	74	(13)
2007–2010	Hamilton Croatia	16	(5)
2011	Hamilton Serbians		
2012	London City		
- * Club domestic league appearances and goals as of July 17, 2012

Jamie Dodds (born November 12, 1981) is a Canadian former soccer player who played at the professional level most notably in the USL A-League (later renamed USL First Division), and later in the Canadian Soccer League. His most notable experience was with the Toronto Lynx, where he received numerous team awards. He later played in the Hamilton region, competing both at the amateur and professional level where he competed in several tournaments.

== Playing career ==
=== Early years & Toronto Lynx ===
Dodds played college soccer for Robert Morris University in Pittsburgh, where he earned First Team All-Northeast Conference honours from 2001–2003. In 2004, he was drafted by the Toronto Lynx of the USL A-League. His signing was announced in a press conference which revealed the team roster for the upcoming season. He made his debut for the club on April 17, 2004, in a match against Puerto Rico Islanders coming on as a substitute for Tyler Hughes. In his rookie season, he played 25 games while missing only two matches and scored two goals, and recorded two assists. At the end of the season, Dodds finished in the top five for the Lynx in games and minutes played.

On March 17, 2005, the Lynx announced the re-signing of Dodds for the 2005 season. He had a productive season despite Toronto finishing the season last in the standings; where he recorded 6 goals and recorded 3 assists making him the top team goal scorer and co-leader in assists. When the season came to a conclusion Dodds was named the Lynx Most Valuable Player.

In April 2006, Dodds signed a new contract with the club and entered his third season. In his third season, Dodds was a key member in the Lynx midfield, scoring 6 goals and recording 7 assists. He earned the Lynx Best Offensive Player award, and was selected for USL All-Star match against English club Sheffield Wednesday. He also featured in the 2006 Open Canada Cup tournament where he appeared in the 2nd round of the tournament against the Serbian White Eagles FC, where he scored both goals in a 2-2 draw which concluded in a victory for Toronto in a penalty shootout. Ultimately Toronto would reach the final of the tournament. Once the season came to a conclusion the Lynx franchise dropped two divisions down to the USL Premier Development League, which resulted in Dodds being released from his contract along with all the other professional senior players.

=== Hamilton ===
On February 9, 2007, he returned to his hometown and signed with Hamilton Croatia in the Ontario Soccer League (OSL). In 2009, he was named the OSL's Provincial West division's MVP. He returned to professional soccer for the 2010 season when Hamilton joined the Canadian Soccer League. He made his CSL debut on May 15, 2010, in a 2-1 victory over TFC Academy. Throughout the season he assisted in Croatia securing a postseason berth by finishing third in the First Division, and featured in the CSL Championship final against Brantford Galaxy, in a losing effort. In 2011, he played with the Hamilton Serbians and contributed to the winning goal in securing the Hamilton Spectator Cup against Hamilton Sparta.

== Personal life ==
His brother Rhian Dodds was also a professional soccer player who played in the Scottish Premiership.
