= László Kiss (football manager) =

Hungarian footballer and manager

Laszlo Kiss
Personal information
- Date of birth: 10 September 1949 (age 77)
- Place of birth: Budapest, Hungary

Managerial career
- Years: Team
- 1979–1981: Pénzügyőr SE
- 1982–1983: Ganz-MÁVAG SE
- 1983–1984: Keszthelyi Haladás
- 1984–1985: Győri ETO FC (assistant coach)
- 1986–1987: MTK Budapest FC (assistant coach)
- 1987: Debreceni VSC
- 1988–1989: Volán SC
- 1989: Diósgyőri VTK
- 1990: Vasas SC (assistant coach)
- 1992–1993: Budapest Honvéd FC (assistant coach)
- 1994: Videoton FC
- 1995: Soproni FAC
- 1996: Club Valencia
- 1997: Pécsi MFC
- 1997–1998: Ferencvárosi TC (assistant coach)
- 1999–2000: Club Valencia
- 2001: Kaposvári Rákóczi FC
- 2001–2002: Vasas SC
- 2002: Dibba Al Hissin
- 2004: Club Valencia
- 2008–2009: VB Sports
- 2010–2011: Pécsi MFC
- 2012–2013: Astros Vasas FC
- 2013–2014: Ceglédi VSE

Laszlo Kiss (born 10 September 1949) is a Hungarian former footballer and manager. He managed in the Nemzeti Bajnokság I, Nemzeti Bajnokság II, Dhivehi League, and the Canadian Soccer League.

== Managerial career ==
After briefly playing with Veszprém KFSE, Kiss went into managing several Hungarian clubs. Some of the prominent clubs he managed in the Nemzeti Bajnokság I were Vasas SC, Debreceni VSC, Pécsi MFC, MTK Budapest FC, Kaposvári Rákóczi FC, Videoton FC. In 1996, he went overseas to coach Club Valencia of the Dhivehi League, where he had three stints with the club. In 2008, he signed with rivals VB Sports where he won the Maldives FA Cup in 2008, and the Dhivehi League in 2009. In 2012, he went to Canada to coach Astros Vasas FC of the Canadian Soccer League. He returned to Hungary to coach Ceglédi VSE of the Nemzeti Bajnokság II.
