= Davier Walcott =

Canadian-born Grenadian footballer

Personal information
- Full name: Davier Tureno Walcott
- Date of birth: January 2, 1990 (age 36)
- Place of birth: Toronto, Ontario, Canada
- Position: Midfielder

College career
Years	Team	Apps	(Gls)
2012–2013	Humber Hawks	3	(0)

Senior career*
Years	Team	Apps	(Gls)
2012	North York Astros		
2013–2014	Orlicz Suchedniów		
2014	Woodbridge Strikers		
2017–2019	1. FCA Darmstadt		
2021	North Mississauga SC	8	(0)

International career
2011	Grenada U23	1	(0)
2016	Grenada	6	(0)
- * Club domestic league appearances and goals as of November 7, 2021

Davier Walcott (born January 2, 1990) is a footballer. Born in Canada, he represented the Grenada national team.

== College career ==
Walcott played at the college level with Humber College in 2012.

== Club career ==
In 2012, he played in the Canadian Soccer League with North York Astros. In 2013, he played abroad in the IV Liga with Orlicz Suchedniów. He played with Woodbridge Strikers in League1 Ontario in 2014, but later played abroad in the Verbandsliga Hessen-Süd with 1. FCA Darmstadt.

In 2021, he played in League1 Ontario with North Mississauga SC.

== International career ==
Walcott made his debut for the Grenada national football team on March 19, 2016 in a friendly match against Trinidad and Tobago. He also participation in several matches during the 2017 Caribbean Cup qualification.

== Personal life ==
Walcott's parents were born in La Digue, Saint Andrew Parish in Grenada. In 2022, while playing indoor soccer in a local Toronto tournament, he was shot along with three people. While receiving a life-threatening injury from the incident, it was reported that he recovered from the injury.
