= Uğur Çimen =

Turkish football coach

Personal information
- Full name: Uğur Çimen
- Date of birth: April 5, 1975 (age 51)
- Place of birth: Konya, Turkey

Managerial career
- Years: Team
- 2003–2008: Konyaspor (Technical Director)
- 2009: North York Astros

Uğur Çimen (born 5 April 1975 in Konya) is a Turkish football coach, who managed Konyaspor, and the North York Astros of the Canadian Soccer League.

== Managerial career ==
Çimen's first managerial career was coaching various youth levels with Konyaspor and had been promoted to the first team managerial staff in 2003.

On March 13, 2009 Çimen was appointed head coach of the North York Astros taking over the first team responsibilities of Rafael Carbajal, and thus becoming the ninth coach of North York's 19th history. On March 27, 2009 Çimen was named the director of North York Astros youth soccer school. In preparation for the 2009 season Cimen resolved to bring new players to the squad, with the signing of Samir Ibrahim from FC UGS of the Swiss 1. Liga, as well as first team players such as Nikola Miodrag, Murat Demir, Yekta Ibrahimoglu, and Euloge Awitor. Cimen only re-signed seven veterans from the successful 2008 season squad. His first match was a 2-1 defeat by St. Catharines Wolves on June 8, 2009. After three straight losses Cimen unexpectedly resigned from his coaching duties and returned to Turkey for personal reasons.
