= Boris Krimus =

Russian footballer

Boris Krimus Борис Кримус
Personal information
- Full name: Boris Krimus
- Date of birth: 20 January 1969 (age 57)
- Place of birth: Soviet Union
- Position: Midfielder

Senior career*
Years	Team	Apps	(Gls)
1990	FC Zimbru Chișinău	4	(0)
1991	Bugeac Comrat	29	(0)
1991	FC Tighina	9	(0)
1992	Bugeac Comrat	21	(1)
1993–1994	Bnei Yehuda	17	(0)
1994–1995	Maccabi Ironi Ashdod		
1994–1996	Hapoel Beit She'an	37	(0)
1996–1998	Maccabi Acre		
1998–1999	Maccabi Kafr Kanna		
1999–2000	Hapoel Nazareth Illit		
2003–2006	North York Astros		
- * Club domestic league appearances and goals

Boris Krimus (Russian: Борис Кримус; born January 20, 1969) is a Russian former footballer who played in the Soviet First League, Moldovan National Division, Liga Leumit, and the Canadian Professional Soccer League.

== Playing career ==
Krimus began his career in 1990 with FC Zimbru Chișinău in the Soviet First League. After the collapse of the Soviet Union he featured in the Moldovan National Division with CF Găgăuzia, and FC Tighina. In 1993, he went abroad to Israel to play in the Liga Leumit. During his time in Israel he played with Bnei Yehuda Tel Aviv F.C., Maccabi Ironi Ashdod F.C., Hapoel Beit She'an F.C., Hapoel Acre F.C., Maccabi Kafr Kanna F.C., and Hapoel Nazareth Illit F.C. In 2003, he went overseas to Canada to sign with North York Astros of the Canadian Professional Soccer League.
