= Gabe Gala =

Canadian soccer player (born 1989)

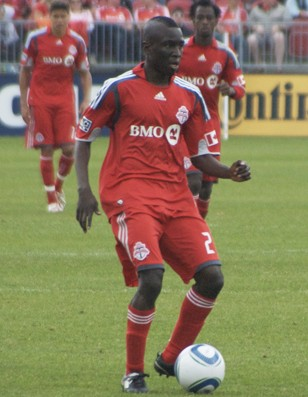
- Gala in 2010

Personal information
- Full name: Gala Gabriel Gala
- Date of birth: June 29, 1989 (age 37)
- Place of birth: Yola, Nigeria
- Height: 5 ft 7 in (1.70 m)
- Position: Midfielder

Youth career
- Brampton East
- 2005–2006: North Mississauga SC

College career
Years	Team	Apps	(Gls)
2008–2009	Toronto Varsity Blues		

Senior career*
Years	Team	Apps	(Gls)
2007–2010	Toronto FC	17	(0)
2011	Mississauga Eagles		
2014	North York Astros		
2015	Scarborough SC		
2016	North Mississauga SC	10	(1)

International career^{‡}
2006–2009	Canada U20	9	(0)
- * Club domestic league appearances and goals as of 10 October 2016 ‡ National team caps and goals as of 11 June 2015

Gala Gabriel Gala (born June 29, 1989) is a Canadian soccer player.

== Career ==
=== Youth ===
Gala moved from his native Nigeria to Brampton, Ontario as a young child. He played club soccer for the Brampton East SC and North Mississauga SC and his high schools Saint Marguerite D’Youville and C. W. Jefferys.

=== Professional ===
Gala joined Toronto FC as a development player in 2007, and played extensively in the MLS Reserve Division prior to him making his professional debut on June 2, 2007, when he came on as a substitute against the Colorado Rapids. He scored his first goal for the Toronto FC first-team in an international friendly against Real Madrid on August 7, 2009. After making 15 appearances for Toronto in the 2010 season he was waived by the club on November 24 following the 2010 MLS Expansion Draft. He also attended the University of Toronto and played for the Varsity Blues during this time.

In 2011, he signed with newly expansion Mississauga Eagles FC of the Canadian Soccer League. He took two years of a sabbatical from soccer, and later returned in 2014 to sign with North York Astros. During his tenure with North York he helped the club secure a postseason berth by finishing fourth in the postseason. After the departure of North York from the CSL he signed with expansion franchise Scarborough SC.

In 2016, he joined League1 Ontario club North Mississauga SC.

== International ==
Gala made his debut for the Canada's U-20 team on May 19, 2006, against Brazil, and made his first start against the United States on July 9, 2006. He was also a member of Canada's U20 side for the 2007 U20 World Cup.

== Club statistics ==
Season	Team	League	Domestic League		Domestic Playoffs		Domestic Cup		Continental Championship		Total	
Season	Team	League	Apps	Goals	Apps	Goals	Apps	Goals	Apps	Goals	Apps	Goals
2007	Toronto FC	MLS	5	0	-	-	-	-	-	-	5	0
2008	Toronto FC	MLS	1	0	-	-	-	-	-	-	1	0
2009	Toronto FC	MLS	1	0	-	-	-	-	-	-	1	0
2010	Toronto FC	MLS	10	0	-	-	4	0	1	0	15	0
Career Total			17	0	-	-	4	0	1	0	22	0

== Honours ==
=== Toronto FC ===
- Canadian Championship (1): 2010
