= Edgar Bartolomeu =

Angolan footballer

Personal information
- Full name: Edgar Jaime Pereira Bartolomeu
- Date of birth: 14 September 1976 (age 50)
- Place of birth: Angola
- Height: 5 ft 10 in (1.78 m)
- Position: Defender

Youth career
- 1992–1997: Sporting CP

Senior career*
Years	Team	Apps	(Gls)
1998	North York Astros	1	(0)
1999–2000	Toronto Lynx	11	(0)
2000–2001	Buffalo Blizzard (indoor)	20	(2)
2001	Brampton Hitmen	11	(0)
2001–2005	Philadelphia KiXX (indoor)	101	(16)
2002	Long Island Rough Riders	15	(2)
2003	MetroStars	13	(0)
2004–2006	Toronto Lynx	37	(1)
2006–2007	Philadelphia KiXX (indoor)	25	(7)
2013–2015	Rochester Lancers (indoor)	30	(4)
- * Club domestic league appearances and goals

Edgar Jaime Pereira Bartolomeu (born 14 September 1976) is an Angolan former professional footballer who played as a defender and midfielder.

== Playing career ==
=== Early career ===
Bartolomeu started off playing Futsal in 1992 in Portugal with the Sporting Clube de Portugal youth team. After moving to Canada, he signed with the North York Astros of the Canadian Professional Soccer League. He made his debut on 4 October 1998, in a semi-final playoff match against the Toronto Olympians.

In 1999, he signed a professional contract with the Toronto Lynx. He made his debut on 2 May 1999, in a match against the Minnesota Thunder. The following season Bartolomeu helped the Lynx finish third in the Northeastern division which clinched a playoff berth for the club for the second time in the franchise's history. In the postseason the Lynx reached the eastern conference finals but were eliminated by the Rochester Rhinos.

The following year, Bartolomeu returned to the CPSL and signed with the expansion franchise the Brampton Hitmen. He made his debut for the club on 27 July 2001, in an Open Canada Cup match against St. Catharines Wolves.

=== MLS and USL ===
In 2002, he played for the Long Island Rough Riders in the USL Pro Soccer League, helping them to a championship and division title. After the conclusion of the indoor season, he trained with the MetroStars of the Major Soccer League during the preseason and was ultimately signed to a contract. Originally he was signed by Chicago Fire but given to New York for the rights of Andy Williams. In his debut season, he played 18 games in total for the team. He also started in the 2003 U.S. Open Cup final against Chicago were New York was defeated.

The MetroStars recalled him for preseason and paid the Philadelphia KiXX for his full player rights but ended up releasing him before the 2004 season started, prompting him to return to the Philadelphia KiXX. In 2004, Bartolomeu, returned to the Toronto Lynx and his signing was announced on 16 April 2004. He re-signed with Toronto for the 2006 season which marked their final season in the USL First Division. During the 2006 season, he helped Toronto reach the 2006 Open Canada Cup final against Ottawa St. Anthony Italia.

=== Indoor career ===
In the winter of 2001, he signed with the Buffalo Blizzard in the National Professional Soccer League. That same year the NPSL ceased operation and several of its remaining teams formed the Major Indoor Soccer League, but the Blizzard declined to participate and folded at that time. Bartolomeu was then picked on the dispersal draft by the Philadelphia KiXX for the 2001–02 indoor season, being an important part of the team's first-ever championship.

Bartolomeu returned to Philadelphia for the 2006–07 indoor season which marked his fifth season with the club. In his final season in Philadelphia, he assisted in securing his second indoor championship title. After a six-year hiatus, he returned to the Major Indoor Soccer League for the 2013–14 season to play with Rochester Lancers. He re-signed with Rochester for the following season.

== International career ==
Bartolomeu was born in Angola and later became a Canadian citizen which potentially allowed him to represent the Canada men's national soccer team. In 2004, he was called to the Canada national team camp held in Florida by head coach Frank Yallop.

== Honors ==
- Major Indoor Soccer League Champions: 2001/2002
- USL D3-Pro League Champions: 2002
- USL D3-Pro League Atlantic Division Champions: 2002
- Major Indoor Soccer League Champions: 2006/2007
