= Vitaliy Mishchenko =

Ukrainian footballer

Personal information
- Full name: Vitaliy Mishchenko
- Date of birth: 26 August 1975 (age 51)
- Place of birth: Ukraine SSR, Soviet Union
- Position: Midfielder

Senior career*
Years	Team	Apps	(Gls)
1993–1995	FC CSKA Kyiv	29	(2)
1993–1994	→ FC Nyva Myronivka (loan)	5	(0)
1994–1995	→ FC Sumy (loan)	10	(0)
1995–2006	Obolon Kyiv	191	(26)
1999–2002	→ FC Obolon-2 Kyiv	31	(1)
2002–2004	→ Krasyliv-Obolon (loan)	35	(4)
2006	North York Astros		
- * Club domestic league appearances and goals

Vitaliy Mishchenko (born August 26, 1975) is a Ukrainian former footballer who played in the Ukrainian Premier League, Ukrainian First League, Ukrainian Second League, and the Canadian Soccer League.

== Playing career ==
Mishchenko began his career in 1993 with FC CSKA Kyiv in the Ukrainian Second League. That same season he was loaned to FC Nyva Myronivka appearing in five matches. In 1994, he was loaned to PFC Sumy, and helped the club achieve promotion to the Ukrainian First League. In 1995, he signed with Obolon Kyiv, and helped the club win two league titles as well as a promotion to the Ukrainian Premier League. He also had two loan spells with FC Krasyliv during the 2002-2003, and 2003-2004 seasons. In 2006, he went overseas to sign with North York Astros of the Canadian Soccer League.
