= Erik Ľupták =

Slovak footballer

Personal information
- Full name: Erik Ľupták
- Date of birth: 7 June 1990 (age 36)
- Place of birth: Rimavská Sobota, Czechoslovakia
- Height: 1.73 m (5 ft 8 in)
- Position: Midfielder

Team information
- Current team: TJ Baník Kalinovo

Senior career*
Years	Team	Apps	(Gls)
2008–2009	MFK Dubnica	16	(1)
2009	→Évian Thonon Gaillard FC	1	(0)
2009–2011	MFK Dubnica	51	(4)
2011	→FK Púchov loan		
2012	TSG Neustrelitz	4	(0)
2012–2013	Putnok VSE	11	(3)
2014	Astros Vasas FC		
2014–2015	ŠK Senec	11	(1)
2015–2016	MŠK Rimavská Sobota	4	(1)
2016–2017	TJ Baník Kalinovo	6	(2)
- * Club domestic league appearances and goals as of 29 April 2017

Erik Ľupták (7 June 1990 in Rimavská Sobota) is a Slovak footballer who currently plays as a midfielder for TJ Baník Kalinovo in the 3. Liga.

== Playing career ==
Luptak began his career in 2008 in the Slovak Super Liga with MFK Dubnica. In 2009, he was loaned abroad to France to play with Evian Thonon Gaillard F.C. in the Championnat National. After his loan expired he returned to Dubnica where he received more playing time. In 2012, he had stints with TSG Neustrelitz and Putnok VSE. In 2014, he played with Astros Vasas in the Canadian Soccer League. He returned to Slovakia by August 2014 to play in the 2. Liga with ŠK Senec. He later played for MŠK Rimavská Sobota.
