= Dragan Radović =

Montenegrin footballer (born 1976)

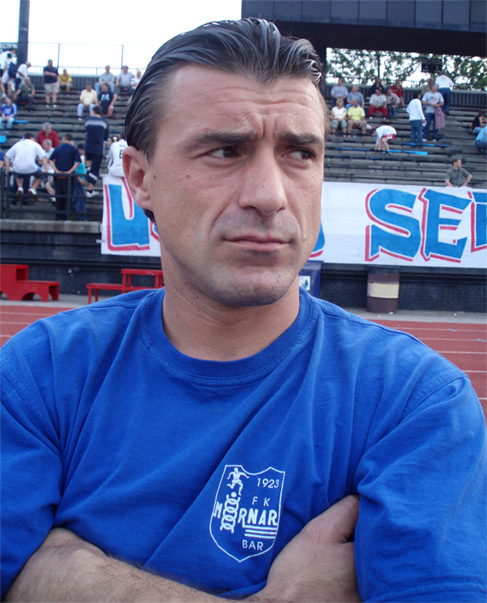
- Radović in 2007

Personal information
- Full name: Dragan Radović
- Date of birth: 29 September 1976 (age 50)
- Place of birth: Danilovgrad, SR Montenegro, SFR Yugoslavia
- Height: 1.83 m (6 ft 0 in)
- Position: Striker

Senior career*
Years	Team	Apps	(Gls)
1998–2000	Iskra Danilovgrad		
2000–2001	Rudar Pljevlja	11	(3)
2001–2002	Obilić	23	(14)
2002–2003	Trudbenik	21	(10)
2003–2004	Mogren	11	(8)
2004–2005	Zora Spuž		
2005–2006	Mornar Bar		
2006–2009	Serbian White Eagles	66	(25)
2010–2011	Iskra Danilovgrad		
- * Club domestic league appearances and goals as of 18 October 2017

Dragan Radović (Cyrillic: Драган Радовић; born 29 September 1976) is a Montenegrin retired professional footballer who played as a striker.

== Playing career ==
Radović began his career in the Second League of FR Yugoslavia in 1998 where he had stints with Iskra Danilovgrad, and Rudar Pljevlja. In 2001, he signed with FK Obilić in the First League of FR Yugoslavia. After a season in the top flight he returned to the second league to play with Trudbenik, FK Mogren, and Zora Spuž. In 2005, he signed with FK Mornar. Following Montenegro regaining independence in 2006, he signed with the Serbian White Eagles of the Canadian Soccer League thus becoming Montenegro's first international football transfer.

He made his debut for the Serbian White Eagles on August 11, 2006 against Toronto Supra Portuguese, where he recorded a goal in a 2-1 victory. In his debut season he assisted in clinching the International Division title and in reaching the CSL Championship final against Italia Shooters. In the 2008 season he finished as the club's top goalscorer with twelve goals. He assisted in securing the championship title against Trois-Rivières Attak, where Serbia won the match after a 2-1 victory in a penalty shootout.

After one season in his first club Iskra Danilovgrad he retired from competitive football in 2011. He is commonly referred to by his nickname Ruso.

== Honours ==
=== Serbian White Eagles ===
- CSL Championship: 2008
- Canadian Soccer League International Division: 2006, 2007, 2009
