= Carlos Zeballos =

Canadian soccer player

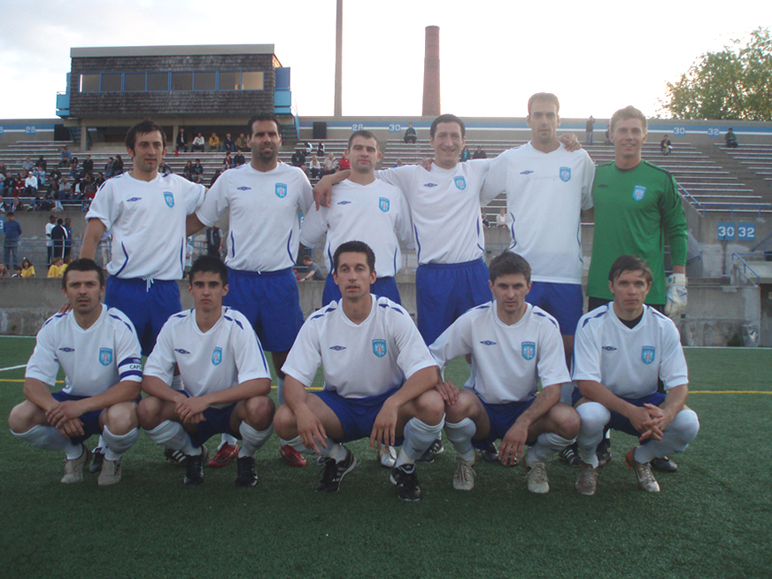
- Zeballos in 2009

Personal information
- Full name: Carlos Manuel Zeballos
- Place of birth: Canada
- Positions: Defender; forward

Senior career*
Years	Team	Apps	(Gls)
1993–1995	Scarborough Astros		
1997	Toronto Supra		
2005	Club River Plate	4	(0)
2006–2007	Toronto Supra Portuguese		
2008	North York Astros		
2009	Serbian White Eagles		
- * Club domestic league appearances and goals

Carlos Zeballos is a former Canadian soccer player who played in the Canadian National Soccer League, Uruguayan División Intermedia and the Canadian Soccer League.

== Playing career ==
Zeballos played with Scarborough Astros of the Canadian National Soccer League from 1993 till 1995. In 1997, he signed with Toronto Supra where he helped the club clinch a postseason berth. In the first round of the playoffs he helped Supra defeat Toronto Croatia by a score of 8-1 on goals on aggregate. In the CNSL Championship finals Toronto faced St. Catharines Roma Wolves, but lost the series by a score of 4-3 on goals on aggregate. In 2005, he played with Club River Plate of the Paraguayan División Intermedia where he featured in four matches. In 2006, he returned to Canada to sign with his former club Toronto Supra (now playing under the name Toronto Supra Portuguese) in the Canadian Soccer League. In 2008, he signed with North York Astros (formerly Scarborough Astros) where he helped the club clinch a postseason berth by finishing second in the National Division. At the conclusion of the season he was awarded the CSL Defender of the Year award.
