= Gabriel Salguero =

Argentine footballer

Personal information
- Full name: Gabriel Ernesto Salguero
- Date of birth: August 19, 1985 (age 41)
- Place of birth: Bell Ville, Argentina
- Position: Defender

Senior career*
Years	Team	Apps	(Gls)
2001–2002	Deportivo Cuenca	4	(0)
2002–2005	North York Astros		
2006	Defensores de Belgrano	11	(0)
- * Club domestic league appearances and goals

Gabriel Salguero is an Argentinian former footballer who played in the Ecuadorian Serie A, Canadian Professional Soccer League, and the Primera B Metropolitana.

== Playing career ==
Salguero played with Deportivo Cuenca of the Ecuadorian Serie A in 2001. On July 20, 2002, he signed a contract with North York Astros of the Canadian Professional Soccer League. In his debut season with North York he reached the CPSL Championship where they faced the Ottawa Wizards, but lost the match by a score of 2–0. In total he played four seasons with North York. In 2006, he signed with Defensores de Belgrano of the Primera B Metropolitana, where he featured in 11 matches.
