= Nelson Ryan Zamora =

Canadian soccer player (born 1991)

Ryan Zamora
Personal information
- Full name: Nelson Ryan Zamora
- Date of birth: 29 July 1991 (age 35)
- Place of birth: Canada
- Height: 1.84 m (6 ft 0 in)
- Position: Goalkeeper

Youth career
- 2007–2008: Club Universitario de Deportes
- 2009: Liverpool Fútbol Club

Senior career*
Years	Team	Apps	(Gls)
2010	North York Astros	10	
2011–2012	Racing Club de Montevideo	16	
2013	Canadian	11	(0)
2014–2017	El Tanque Sisley	28	(0)
- * Club domestic league appearances and goals as of March 15, 2018

Nelson Ryan Zamora (born July 29, 1991) is a Canadian soccer player who played in the Peruvian Primera División, Canadian Soccer League and Uruguayan Primera División.

== Playing career ==
Zamora began his youth career in 2007 with Universitario de Deportes in the Peruvian Primera División, Then went abroad in 2009 to Uruguay to join Liverpool Fútbol Club, In 2010 Zamora Started his Senior career with North York Astros in the Canadian Soccer League. In 2012, he went abroad to Uruguay to sign with Racing Club de Montevideo, where he primary featured in the Reserved squad. He later played with Canadian Soccer Club in the Uruguayan Segunda División. In 2014, he signed with El Tanque Sisley in the Uruguayan Primera División.
