= Caribbean Stars =

Former Canadian association football team

- Full name: Caribbean Stars
- Founded: 1995 (as Caribbean Stars Soccer Club)
Home colours	Away colours

Caribbean Stars Soccer Club was a professional soccer club in the Greater Toronto Arena, Canada, which evolved to a news and sports website.

Its inception was in 1995 as a founding member of the Canadian International Soccer League (CISL). In 2006, Caribbean Stars returned to the professional scene with the launching of the Caribbean Selects franchise which competed in the Canadian Soccer League (CSL). The team played their home games at Birchmount Stadium in Toronto, Ontario. After one season in the CSL, and finishing in the bottom half of the International Division the team ceased operations.

== History ==
The club was formed in 1995 and was a charter member in the Canadian International Soccer League. The founders were Aldwyn McGill and Noel Denny. McGill also served in the capacity of head coach . The team's home venue was located at Lamport Stadium. Notable alumni were Chris Handsor, Elvis Thomas, Bayete Smith, Anton Skerritt, Cameron Walker, St. Lucian internationals Éric Fanis and Edwin Ferdinand.

In their debut season in the CISL the club reached the playoffs semifinals, but were defeated by Toronto Italia. At the conclusion of the regular season the Caribbean Stars participated in the indoor winter season, where the team reached the semifinals again. The organization's most successful season was the following indoor winter season winning the 1996/1997 CISL Indoor Championship. The following season the CISL merged with the Canadian National Soccer League, but the Stars opted against joining the CNSL as it lacked the financial resources to compete in the league.

Following the demise of the Puma League the club was renamed the Caribbean Stars Community Promotions. Caribbeanstars.com website was launched on May 21, 2005, and SSR Magazine publication in April 2007. On March 16, 2006, the Caribbean Stars along with former Brampton Stallions manager Neil Palmer announced plans to field a team in the Canadian Soccer League for the 2006 season. Aldwyn McGill was appointed director of operations, while Corcel Blair Jr. was named technical director. On March 20, 2006, the team changed its name to the Caribbean Selects, due to a conflict with the Windsor Border Stars over the similarity of the teams' names which would have caused media confusion.

The Selects initially had intentions of using Birchmount Stadium as their home venue, but were required to split their home matches between Esther Shiner Stadium, and Lamport Stadium as Birchmount was undergoing renovations. The Selects made their CSL debut on May 28, 2006, in a match against the North York Astros, and the match concluded in a draw. Their first victory came on June 17, 2006, in a 2–1 victory over Windsor. Unfortunately the team struggled to achieve results, and as a result finished last in the International Division. At the conclusion of the season the league awarded the Selects with the CSL Fair Play award as the most disciplined team throughout the season. After one season the Caribbean Selects franchise was revoked.

In 2017, a professional indoor soccer league was formed called the Arena Premier League. Promoted as a multicultural league a few former members of Caribbean Stars recruited players and entered a Caribbean Stars FC team into the league; this club had no affiliation with the original Caribbean Stars organization. The management team consisted of Pernell Mason, and Rick Titus as head coaches, while John Williams, and Linford Reid were the team's managers.

== Head coaches ==
Years	Name	Nation
1995-1996	Aldwyn McGill	Trinidad and Tobago
2006	Corcel Blair Jr.	Jamaica
2017-	Pernell Mason; Rick Titus	Trinidad and Tobago

== Year-by-year ==
Year	Division	League	Regular season	Playoffs
2006	1 - International Division	CSL	Fifth	Did not qualify
2017–18	1 - International division	APL	Third	Final
