= Aldwyn McGill =

Trinidadian magazine editor

Aldwyn McGill is an association football manager, businessman, league administrator, and current publisher and chief editor of Stars Soccer Review.

McGill began playing association football in his native country of Trinidad and Tobago with teams like of Morvant United Football Club, Colts FC, and Cipriani United Sports Club. In 1973, he moved abroad to Canada and trained with the Toronto Metros of the North American Soccer League. After failing to make the team he began administrating local Toronto soccer leagues like Toronto and District Soccer League, and Toronto Caribbean Soccer League. He wrote the constitution and by-laws for the newly formed Canadian International Soccer League (Puma League), and formed his own club the Caribbean Stars which competed within the league in 1995.

He would also serve as the head coach for the Caribbean Stars, and led the club in winning the 1996–97 CISL Indoor Championship. After the CISL folded he was appointed director of soccer operations for the newly formed Metro Lions of the Canadian Professional Soccer League in 2002. Shortly after he was appointed the head coach for the team, and led the Lions to a third place finish in the Eastern Conference. In the playoffs the Metro Lions faced Ottawa Wizards, but were eliminated by a score of 1–0. At the conclusion of the season he was awarded the CPSL Coach of the Year award. The following season, he stepped down from his position of head coach, but retained the positions of President and General Manager. In 2006, McGill helped bring back the Caribbean Stars to the professional level by launching the Caribbean Selects to compete in the Canadian Soccer League. He would serve as director of operations for the club. He is currently the publisher and chief editor of Stars Soccer Review, a sports magazine which covers association football in Canada, Trinidad & Tobago, and Jamaica.
