= Milodrag Akmadžić =

Croatian footballer and coach

- Akmadžić with Toronto Croatia in 2012

Personal information
- Full name: Milodrag Akmadžić
- Place of birth: SFR Yugoslavia
- Position: Defender

Senior career*
Years	Team	Apps	(Gls)
1994	Zrinjski Mostar		
1996–1997	Toronto Croatia		
1996–1997	Toronto Shooting Stars (indoor)	24	(7)
2000	Toronto Croatia	12	(0)
2001–2005	Brampton Hitmen/Stallions		

Managerial career
- 2005: Brampton Stallions
- 2006: Toronto Croatia (assistant)
- 2007: Toronto Croatia
- 2011–2015: Toronto Croatia (assistant)
- –2019: Mississauga MetroStars (assistant)
- * Club domestic league appearances and goals

Milodrag "Backo" Akmadžić is a Croatian retired footballer and is a former assistant coach with Toronto Croatia of the Canadian Soccer League. Akmadžić played the majority of his career in the Canadian Professional Soccer League and had a stint in the National Professional Soccer League. After his retirement from competitive soccer, he went into the field of coaching teams within the CSL.

== Playing career ==
Akmadžić played in the First League of Herzeg-Bosnia in 1994 with Zrinjski Mostar.

He would begin his North American career in 1996 with Toronto Croatia of the Canadian International Soccer League. During the winter season he signed with Toronto Shooting Stars of the National Professional Soccer League. Where he appeared in 24 matches and recorded seven goals and two assists. In 1997, Toronto Croatia entered the Canadian National Soccer League, where he served as team captain. He helped Toronto secure a playoff berth by finishing second in the standings. The following season he retired from competitive soccer. Akmadžić made his return to soccer and resigned with Toronto Croatia in 2000. His first match back was on May 31, 2000 in a match against Glen Shields Sun Devils. He helped Toronto qualify for the playoffs by finishing third in the standings. He reached the CPSL Championship finals where they faced league giants Toronto Olympians, and won the match by a score of 2-1.

In 2001, he would sign with newly expansion Brampton Hitmen. During his five year tenure with Brampton his greatest success with the organization was in 2003, where he assisted in their CPSL championship run.

== Managerial career ==
In 2005, Akmadžić was given his first coaching role as he served as the head coach for Brampton after the position was vacant for some time. In 2006, he returned to Toronto Croatia to serve as the club's assistant coach. The following season he was elevated to the position of head coach and helped Toronto achieve a 21 game undefeated streak, and reach the postseason by finishing second in the International Division. In the playoffs Toronto reached the finals where they faced arch rivals the Serbian White Eagles FC in a two game final, where Croatia would end up claiming the CSL Championship in a 4-1 victory on goals on aggregate. He also achieved success on the international level by claiming the Croatian World Club Championship. Since 2011, he has served as assistant coach under Velimir Crljan.

He was dismissed as assistant manager of Mississauga MetroStars in March 2019.
