= Victoria Adjetey =

Ghanaian politician

Hon. Victoria Adjetey

Member of parliament for Ga south constituency
- In office 7 January 1993 – 7 January 1997
- President: Jerry John Rawlings
- Succeeded by: Margaret Clarke Kwesie

Personal details
- Born: 5 June 1942 (age 84)
- Party: National Democratic Congress
- Education: Public Health Nurses School
- Occupation: Politician
- Profession: Nurse

Victoria Adjetey is a Ghanaian politician and a nurse. She served as a member of parliament for the Ga South constituency in Greater Accra region of Ghana.

== Early life and education ==
Victoria Adjetey was born on 5 June 1942, she attended Public Health Nurses School where she obtained a Public Health Nursing Certificate in nursing.

== Career ==
She was a former member of the first parliament of the Fourth Republic, she served from January 1993 to January 1997. She is also a nurse.

== Politics ==
Adjetey was elected member of the first parliament of the Fourth Republic during the 1992 Ghanaian parliamentary election on the ticket of the National Democratic Congress. She lost the seat to Margaret Clarke Kwesie of the National Democratic Congress in 1996 Ghanaian general election who defeated Eric Busby Quartey-Papafio of the New Patriotic Party; Jesse Nii Adu Commey Randolp of Convention People's Party; Daniel Addoquaye Pappoe of People's National Congress and Amekah Kwadzo John of Great Consolidated Popular Party.

She was elected with a total valid vote cast of 49,758. This was equivalent to 52.20% of the total valid votes cast. Her opponents obtained respectively 19,180, 3,092, 2,416 and 1,485 votes out of the total valid votes cast. These were equivalent to 20.10%, 3.20%, 2.50% and 1.60% respectively of the total valid votes.

== Personal life ==
She is a Christian.
