= David DiPlacido =

Canadian former soccer player

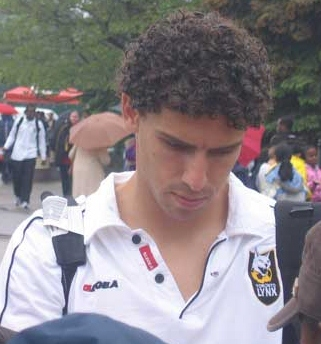
- DiPlacido in 2006

Personal information
- Date of birth: May 18, 1977 (age 49)
- Place of birth: Newmarket, Ontario, Canada
- Height: 5 ft 8 in (1.73 m)
- Position: Midfielder

Senior career*
Years	Team	Apps	(Gls)
1998–2005	Toronto Lynx	182	(7)
2002	→Mississauga Olympians (loan)	4	(2)
2004	Philadelphia KiXX (indoor)	12	(3)
2005	Montreal Impact	11	(0)
2006	Toronto Lynx	24	(0)
2007	North York Astros		
2008	Italia Shooters		

International career
1992–1993	Canada U17	9	(0)
- * Club domestic league appearances and goals

David DiPlacido (born May 18, 1977) is a Canadian former soccer player who played as a midfielder. He is the Toronto Lynx's all-time leader in club appearances and is the technical director for Aurora Youth Soccer Club.

== Playing career ==
=== Toronto Lynx ===
Diplacido was born in Newmarket, Ontario. He began playing at the professional level in 1998 in the USL A-League with Toronto Lynx. In his debut season with Toronto, he received the club's Public Relations award. He appeared in 17 matches in his debut season in the A-League. He re-signed with Toronto for the following season.

In 2000, the Lynx extended his contract for his third consecutive season with the club. In the initial stages of the 2000 season, he recorded his first professional goal on April 30, 2000, against Pittsburgh Riverhounds SC. He helped Toronto secure a postseason berth for the second time in the club's history. Toronto would reach the Conference finals against Rochester Rhinos but would be eliminated from the playoffs by a score of 2–1 on goals on aggregate.

He returned to Toronto for his fourth season in 2001 and received the club's Fan Favourite award. His fifth season with Toronto was notable as he reached a personal milestone by making his 100th appearance on June 9, 2002, against Charleston Battery.

After the conclusion of the 2002 A-League season, he was loaned to the Mississauga Olympians of the Canadian Professional Soccer League in order to assist the club in securing a playoff berth. He made his debut on September 11, 2002, in a CPSL Canada Cup match against Toronto Croatia. He helped Mississauga secure a postseason by recording the winning goal against Hamilton Thunder in a 3–2 victory. The Olympians were eliminated in the opening round of the playoffs to the North York Astros.

He resumed his duties with Toronto Lynx for the 2003 season and was named to the A-League Team of the Week in the finals weeks of the season. He also received an additional team award as the club's Best Offensive Player. After spending the winter season with Philadelphia KiXX the Lynx re-signed him for the 2004 season.

After a short stint in Montreal, he returned to the Toronto Lynx for the 2006 campaign. Throughout the 2006 season, he assisted Toronto in reaching the finals of the Open Canada Cup, where they were defeated by Ottawa St. Anthony Italia. The 2006 season marked his final year with the Toronto Lynx, where he finished first in the rankings in the club's all-time match appearances with 206.

=== Montreal Impact ===
He returned to Toronto for the 2005 season, but was transferred along with Charles Gbeke to league rivals Montreal Impact before the August 1 transfer deadline. In his debut season with Montreal, he assisted the club in securing a playoff berth by winning the regular-season title. He also helped Montreal in securing a league double by winning the Voyageurs Cup. In the playoffs, Montreal was eliminated from the competition after losing the series to the Seattle Sounders.

=== Canadian Soccer League ===
After the relegation of Toronto Lynx to the Premier Development League, he returned to the Canadian Soccer League to play with North York Astros. He made his debut on June 7 in an exhibition game against the Mexico national under-20 football team. He assisted the Astros in clinching a playoff berth by finishing third in the National Division, but was eliminated by eventual champions Toronto Croatia. He was also selected for the 2007 CSL All-Star match, where he was named to the National Division team.

In 2008, Diplacido signed with league rivals Italia Shooters. Diplacido helped the Shooters win their second International Division title. In their playoff run, he contributed to a victory over the Brampton Lions in the quarterfinals. Ultimately, Italia was defeated in the second round by the Serbian White Eagles.

=== Indoor career ===
In the winter of 2004, he played indoor soccer after he was drafted to play in the Major Indoor Soccer League with Philadelphia KiXX. He assisted Philadelphia in securing a postseason berth but was eliminated in the quarterfinals by the Kansas City Comets. He appeared in 12 matches and recorded 3 goals for Philadelphia.

== International career ==
Diplacido made his debut with the Canada men's national under-17 soccer team on August 12, 1992, against the Cayman Islands in the 1992 CONCACAF U-17 Tournament. He also represented Canada in the 1993 FIFA U-17 World Championship. In total, he represented the Canadian U17 team in nine matches.

== Managerial career ==
In 2007, he became associated with Toronto FC by serving as the training camp director. After the resignation of Vito Colangelo, he was named the technical director for Aurora Youth Soccer Club in 2013.

== Honors ==
Montreal Impact

- USL First Division Commissioners Cup: 2005
- Voyageurs Cup Champions: 2005

Italia Shooters

- Canadian Soccer League International Division: 2008
