= Ivan Jurisic (footballer, born 1970s) =

Serbian footballer

Personal information
- Full name: Ivan Jurisic
- Date of birth: 1972-1974 (Note: Based on reference where he was 24 in 1997)
- Place of birth: Belgrade, SFR Yugoslavia
- Height: 1.75 m (5 ft 9 in)
- Position: Forward

College career
Years	Team	Apps	(Gls)
1998	Laurier Golden Hawks		

Senior career*
Years	Team	Apps	(Gls)
1991	Toronto Argentina		
1992-1993	Toronto Blizzard	18	(2)
1995–1996	Hamilton White Eagles		
1997	Toronto Lynx	1	(0)
1998–1999	North York Astros		
2001–2004	Brampton Hitmen		
- * Club domestic league appearances and goals

Ivan Jurisic is a Serbian former footballer who played the majority of his career in North American soccer leagues.

== Playing career ==
Jurisic played in the National Soccer League in 1991 with Toronto Argentina. The following season he played in the Canadian Soccer League with Toronto Blizzard. He continued playing with Toronto Blizzard in the American Professional Soccer League in 1993. After appearing in three matches with Toronto he was waived on June 18, 1993. In 1995, he returned to the Canadian National Soccer League to play with the Hamilton White Eagles. He made his debut for the club on May 29, 1995 in a match against Toronto Italia. He also played in the Canadian International Soccer League when Hamilton White Eagles joined the league in 1996.

In 1997, he was signed by expansion franchise the Toronto Lynx of the USISL A-League. The following season Jurisic returned to his former team under the name the North York Astros in the newly formed Canadian Professional Soccer League. He made his debut for the team on June 24, 1998 in a match against Toronto Croatia. He also played at the college level in 1998 at Wilfrid Laurier University. In 2001, he signed with league rivals Brampton Hitmen. During his term with Brampton his biggest achievement with the club was in 2003, where he won the CPSL Championship after defeating Vaughan Sun Devils in the playoff finals by a score of 1-0.
