= Siniša Ninković =

Serbian footballer and manager

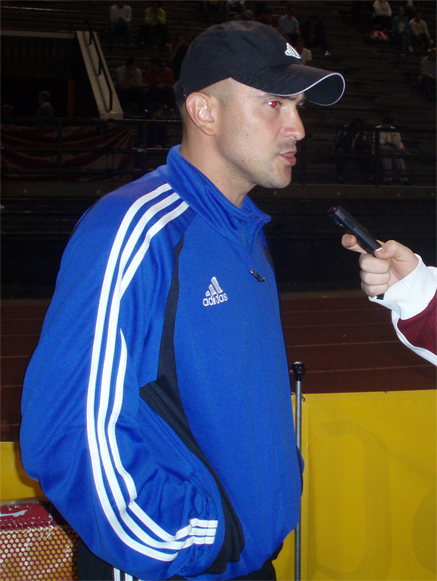
- Ninković in 2007

Personal information
- Full name: Siniša Ninković
- Date of birth: June 12, 1977 (age 49)
- Place of birth: Belgrade, SFR Yugoslavia
- Height: 1.81 m (5 ft 11 1/2 in)
- Position: Defender

Youth career
- 1994–1995: Partizan

Senior career*
| Years | Team | Apps | (Gls) |
| 1995–1997 | Radnički Belgrade | 31 | (0) |
| 1997–1998 | Hajduk Belgrade | 14 | (1) |
| 1998 | Visé | | |
| 1998–2002 | Železnik | 75 | (1) |
| 2002–2003 | Sartid Smederevo | 0 | (0) |
| 2006 | Serbian White Eagles | 22 | (0) |

International career
| 1999–2000 | FR Yugoslavia U21 | | |

Managerial career
- 2007: Serbian White Eagles
- * Club domestic league appearances and goals

Siniša Ninković (Serbian Cyrillic: Синиша Нинковић; born June 12, 1977) is a Serbian former footballer and manager who played in First League of Serbia and Montenegro, Second League of Serbia and Montenegro, Belgian Second Division, and the Canadian Soccer League.

== Playing career ==
=== Club career ===
Ninković began his career in 1994 with Partizan Belgrade of the First League of FR Yugoslavia. After his stint in the top flight he featured primarily with clubs in the Second League of FR Yugoslavia. He had stints with Radnički Belgrade, Hajduk Belgrade, and played with C.S. Visé in the Belgian Second Division. In 1998, he returned to the First League with FK Železnik. Ninković won the Serbia and Montenegro Cup in 2002–03 with Sartid Smederevo under coach Milenko Kiković. In 2006, he went overseas to Canada to sign with Serbian White Eagles of the Canadian Soccer League. In his debut season he clinched the International Division title and secured a postseason berth. He featured in the CSL Championship finals against Italia Shooters, but suffered a 1-0 defeat.

=== International career ===
Ninković was a member of the FR Yugoslavia national under-21 team from 1999–2000 where he featured along the likes of Milivoje Ćirković, Milan Obradović and Ivica Iliev.

== Coaching career ==
In 2007, he was named as the successor to Dušan Belić as head coach of the Serbian White Eagles. He was selected as the head coach for the International Division squad for the CSL All-Star match. Near the conclusion of the season he was replaced by Branko Pavlović due to disagreements with the club's management.

== Honours ==
=== Player ===
Sartid Smederevo

- Serbia and Montenegro Cup: 2002–03

Serbian White Eagles

- Canadian Soccer League International Division: 2006

=== Manager ===
Serbian White Eagles

- Canadian Soccer League International Division: 2007
