= Maryland Mania =

American soccer club

Maryland Mania was a soccer club based in Baltimore, Maryland that competed in the A-League for one year, in 1999. The Mania's original home was UMBC Stadium in Catonsville, but their club relocated to Anne Arundel Community College midway through the season.

== Year-by-year ==
Year	Division	League	Reg. season	Playoffs	Open Cup
1999	2	USL A-League	8th, Atlantic	Did not qualify	Did not qualify

== Coach ==
Justin Fashanu was hired to coach the Mania, but fled the United States during the pre-season when he was accused of sexually assaulting an underage boy. He was replaced as coach by Darryl Gee who was replaced by Paul Kitson during the season.
