= Paul Kitson (footballer, born 1956) =

English footballer

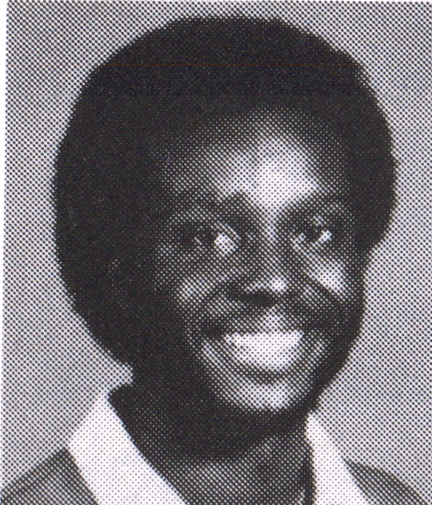
- Kitson circa 1984

Personal information
- Date of birth: 31 May 1956
- Place of birth: London, England
- Date of death: 25 August 2005 (aged 49)
- Place of death: Toronto, Canada
- Positions: Forward; midfielder

Youth career
- Watford

Senior career*
Years	Team	Apps	(Gls)
–1979	New York Apollo		
1980–1981	→ New York United		
1980–1981	Chicago Horizon (indoor)	39	(33)
1981–1983	New York Arrows (indoor)	81	(72)
1983–1986	Baltimore Blast (indoor)	129	(94)
1986–1987	Los Angeles Lazers (indoor)	19	(7)
1987–1988	Cleveland Force (indoor)	38	(10)
1990	New Jersey Eagles		
1992–1993	Denver Thunder (indoor)	25	(3)
1993	Arizona Sandsharks (indoor)		
1993–1994	Detroit Rockers (indoor)	8	(1)
1994	Philadelphia KiXX (indoor)	9	(8)
1996	Detroit Neon (indoor)		
1996–1997	Toronto Shooting Stars (indoor)	11	(17)
1997–1999	Montreal Impact (indoor)	11	(1)
1999	Maryland Mania	10	(0)

Managerial career
- 1998: Montreal Impact
- 1999: Maryland Mania (player-coach)
- 2001: Brampton Hitmen
- 2000–2001: Buffalo Blizzard
- * Club domestic league appearances and goals

Paul Kitson (31 May 1956 – 25 August 2005) was an English footballer who played and coached professionally with both indoor and outdoor soccer teams in Canada and the United States.

== Player ==
Kitson began his career with Watford in England before moving to the United States.

He played in Baltimore Blasts from 1983 to 1986, where he won two championships, before being traded to the LA Lazers. On 6 March 1987, the Los Angeles Lazers traded Kitson to the Cleveland Force for Chris Chueden. He spent the next two seasons with the Force. In 1990, he played for the New Jersey Eagles in the American Professional Soccer League.

== Coach ==
Kitson began his coaching career with the Montreal Impact in 1997. Under his leadership the Impact it to the playoffs both seasons, but the team closed at the end of the 1998 season. On 14 May 1999, the Maryland Mania of the USL A-League hired Kitson. In 2001, Kitson was appointed the head coach for Canadian Professional Soccer League expansion side the Brampton Hitmen. Throughout the season the Hitmen performed poorly without recording a single victory, which resulted in Kitson departing from his post on 25 July 2001.

== Death ==
Kitson died on August 25, 2005, after collapsing while coaching a youth team.
