= Rafael Carbajal =

Uruguayan footballer and coach (born 1960)

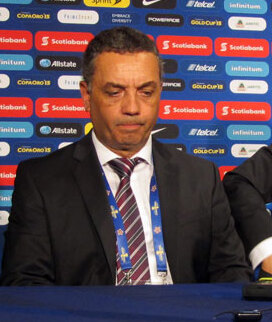
- Carbajal in 2015

Personal information
- Full name: Rafael Carbajal
- Date of birth: September 30, 1960 (age 66)
- Place of birth: Montevideo, Uruguay
- Height: 1.82 m (6 ft 0 in)
- Position: Goalkeeper

Youth career
- 1968–1972: Real Montevideo/Real Colombo
- 1976–1977: Defensor Sporting

Senior career*
Years	Team	Apps	(Gls)
1979	Club Rosario Atlético		
1981–1983	Toronto Croatia		
1984	Bradford Marshlanders		
1985	Toronto Italia		
1986	Nacional Latino		
1987	Panhellenic		
1989	First Portuguese		
1990–1992	Toronto Croatia		
1998	North York Astros		

Managerial career
- 1986: Nacional Latino (player-coach)
- 1994–1996: Scarborough Astros (GK coach)
- 1999–2000: North York Astros
- 2001: North York Azzurri U19
- 2002–2003: C.S. Voltana (GK coach)
- 2003–2004: Faenza Calcio U15
- 2004–2005: Faenza Calcio (assistant)
- 2005–2006: Faenza Calcio
- 2006–2008: North York Astros
- 2009: Serbian White Eagles
- 2010–2011: Milltown FC
- 2010–2011: Canada U18 & U20 (assistant)
- 2011–2012: Oakville SC
- 2012: Canada U23 (assistant)
- 2014–2016: Canada Men (assistant)
- 2016–2017: Canadian S.C.
- 2021: Tacuary
- 2022: Club Atlético 3 de Febrero
- 2023: Atyrá
- 2023–2024: Club Atlético 3 de Febrero
- 2025–: Club Atlético 3 de Febrero
- * Club domestic league appearances and goals

Rafael Carbajal (Spanish pronunciation: [rafaˈel kaɾβaˈxal]; born September 30, 1960) is a Uruguayan former footballer and current manager for Club Atlético 3 de Febrero.

His playing career was mostly spent in the National Soccer League, and concluded in the successor league the Canadian Professional Soccer League. After retiring from the game he made the transition to the managerial side, where he initially began managing in the NSL, and later in the CPSL.

In 2002, he went abroad in order to gain additional experience with his involvement with several Italian clubs. He later returned to the Canadian Soccer League, and was recognized with the CSL Coach of the Year award in 2008. In 2010, he was part-owner of Milltown FC, and also served as head coach in the club's inaugural run in the CSL. He would later serve as an assistant coach to the Canada national team, U-23, U-20, and U-18 teams. In 2016, he managed in the Uruguayan Segunda División for Canadian S.C..

He was instrumental in the creation of League1 Ontario where he served as Technical Director in 2014.

== Playing career ==
In 1981, Carbajal went to Canada to sign with Toronto Croatia of the National Soccer League. During his tenure within the NSL he played with Bradford Marshlanders, Toronto Italia, Nacional Latino, Panhellenic, First Portuguese. He won the NSL Goalkeeper of the Year award three times.

== Coaching career ==
=== Early career ===
Carbajal went into coaching first as a player/coach with Nacional Latino in 1986, then as a goalkeeper coach for Scarborough Astros in 1994.

In 1999, he returned to competitive soccer to play and coach the North York Astros in the Canadian Professional Soccer League.

=== Europe ===
In 2003, he went to Italy to first coach the Faenza Calcio U-15 team. Then he was promoted to assistant coach, and eventually head coach in 2005.

=== Canada ===
In 2007, he returned to coach North York Astros in the renamed Canadian Soccer League and completely transformed the team from a struggling team to a playoff contender. In his first year, he secured a postseason, and in his second season led the team to a second-place finish in the National Division.

The league awarded Carbajal as the Coach of the Year in 2008. In 2009, he was appointed head coach for league giants Serbian White Eagles. He secured the International Division title for the club, but was released by the club before the playoffs. In 2010, Milltown FC announced the signing of Carbajal as head coach. In his first season with Milltown the club finished fourth in the overall standings with the second best defensive record.

In 2013, he succeeded Dino Lopez as the Interim Technical Director for the Oakville Soccer Club.

=== National level ===
In 2010, he served as assistant coach for Canada men's national under-20 soccer team. In 2012, he served as assistant coach for Canada men's national under-23 soccer team, and in January 2014 he was appointed assistant coach to Benito Floro for the Canada men's national soccer team.

=== South America ===
In 2016, he returned to his native country to manage Canadian S.C. of the Uruguayan Segunda División.

In June 2021, he was named the head coach for Tacuary in Paraguay's Tercera División. The following season, Carbajal managed in Paraguay's second-tier league with Club Atlético 3 de Febrero. In 2023, he secured a deal with league rivals Atyrá, where he only managed the club in one match. Shortly after, he returned to his former club, 3 de Febrero, initially as a technical director. Immediately after, he was named the manager for the club.

In 2025, he returned to manage Club Atlético 3 de Febrero.

== Honours ==
=== Manager ===
==== Club ====
- Canadian Soccer League International Division: 2009

==== Individual ====
- Canadian Soccer League Coach of the Year: 2008
