= Brampton Stallions =

Former Canadian Soccer League team

- Full name: Brampton Stallions
- Nickname: The Stallions
- Founded: 2001 (as Brampton Hitmen)
- Dissolved: 2006
- Stadium: Victoria Park Stadium
- League: Canadian Soccer League
- 2006: 2nd, Play-off Quarter-Finals
| Home colours | Away colours |

Brampton Stallions were a Canadian soccer team, founded in 2001 as the Brampton Hitmen before changing its name in 2005. The team was a member of the Canadian Soccer League and played in the National Division. The team went "dormant" in 2006.

The Stallions played their home games at Victoria Park Stadium in the city of Brampton, Ontario, around 25 miles west of downtown Toronto. The team's colours were black and white. The club struggled during its infant stages failing to make the postseason during its first two seasons. Until finally capturing the CPSL Championship in 2003, and ending as playoff contender during its final tenure within the league.

== History ==
Brampton came into existence and entered the Canadian Professional Soccer League in 2001, along with Toronto Supra, Ottawa Wizards, and Montreal Dynamites. The franchise was placed in the Western Conference and would call Victoria Park Stadium as their home venue. Former Montreal Impact head coach Paul Kitson was appointed to the position. Kitson stocked his inaugural roster with former USL A-League players like Edgar Bartolomeu, Francisco Dos Santos, Laryea Adjetey, Ivan Jurisic, Paulo Silva, Adolfo Mella, and named CPSL veteran Phil Ionadi captain. The Hitmen debuted on June 3, 2001, in a 1–1 draw against the St. Catharines Wolves. Kitson struggled to achieve results for the club, which led to his dismissal from his post after going eight matches without a victory.

His replacement was Joe Da Silva, who managed Brampton's first victory on August 12, 2001, in a 3–2 win over London City. Da Silva would accomplish a respectable record, but would fall short in gaining a playoff berth. For the 2002 season Da Silva left Brampton to coach a Portuguese third division club, and was replaced by Ed McLaughlin with coaching experience in the Ontario Soccer League. McLaughlin would retain the majority of the roster from the previous season with Paolo Ceccarelli, Luca Centurione, and Milodrag Akmadzic as notable signings. McLaughlin was replaced early on in the season, and Brampton founder and owner Steve Nijjar took over the rein of head coach. Nijjar would achieve a seven-game undefeated streak, and reach the semifinals of the Open Canada Cup tournament, but would be eliminated by the Ottawa Wizards. Nijjar would continue in his capacity as head coach for the 2003 season. Hector Marinaro, Sr. was appointed the general manager for the organization. Nijjar would strengthen his roster with Hugo Herrera, Ruben Flores, and Jonathan Bustamante. The Brampton franchise would clinch a postseason berth for the first time by finishing second in the Western Conference. Their first opponents in the playoffs were Toronto Croatia, where the match concluded in a 4–3 victory on penalties for Toronto. The next day the league reversed the result after Toronto was caught fielding two suspend club officials. The next match was a wildcard match against London City, which resulted in a 5–3 victory on penalties for Brampton.

The Hitmen reached the finals after Ottawa Wizards pulled out of the playoffs. Their opponents were Vaughan Sun Devils with a goal coming from Kurt Mella the match would end in a 1–0 victory for Brampton, thus capturing their first major trophy within the league. Team captain Phil Ionadi was awarded the Canadian Soccer League MVP Award at the CPSL Awards ceremony. For the 2004 season the Hitmen came to an agreement with Mexican giants Cruz Azul to train their youth players. New signings for the season were Juan Cruz Real, Angel Velazquez, and league veterans Bayete Smith, and Paul Daccobert. Steve Nijjar, Bayete Smith, and Phil Ionadi were selected for the CPSL All-Star roster which faced Boavista F.C. in a friendly match. Brampton qualified for the postseason by finishing fourth in the Western Conference. In the wild card match Brampton faced Toronto Croatia, but were eliminated by a score of 3–1.

In 2005, the franchise was purchased by Electrical Contractor Joe Fuliere, and renamed the team to the Brampton Stallions. While during the season the team performed poorly finishing last in the Western Conference, and failing to clinch a playoff berth. The team began with Ken Dawson as head coach, until being replaced by former defender Milodrag Akmadzic to fill the vacant role of head coach. For the 2006 season the head coach selected for the club was Paul Dhillon, who was a product of The Academy of Football and with coaching experience in the OSL. He reinforced his squad with former Toronto Lynx players Helio Pereira, Andre Andrade, and Clayson Queiroz. Dhillon led the Stallions to the playoffs by finishing second in the National Division. Unfortunately Brampton would forfeit from the playoffs after their home venue had unsuitable playing conditions, which resulted in a dispute with the leagues administration. The team went on hiatus after the 2006 season, and is currently a 'dormant' franchise.

== Final 2006 squad ==
Note: Flags indicate national team as defined under FIFA eligibility rules; some limited exceptions apply. Players may hold more than one non-FIFA nationality.

| No. | Pos. | Nation | Player |
|---|---|---|---|
| 0 | GK | JAM | Samora Mies |
| 2 | DF | CAN | Tony Holder |
| 3 | DF | JAM | Gladston Richards |
| 5 | MF | BRA | Andre De Andrade |
| 6 | MF | JAM | Oneil Sang |
| 7 | MF | JAM | Kevin McIntosh |
| 8 | MF | ENG | Jay Wright |
| 9 | FW | CAN | Omari Harvey |
| 10 | FW | ARG | Hugo Herrera |
| 11 | MF | RUS | Misha Levkov |
| 12 | GK | CAN | Roy Blanche |
| 14 | DF | JAM | Andre Stewart |

| No. | Pos. | Nation | Player |
|---|---|---|---|
| 16 | FW | NGA | Michael Aigbokie |
| 17 | DF | JAM | Ronald Nicholas |
| 18 | DF | JAM | Ruyan Williams |
| 19 | MF | JAM | Lexton Hurlock |
| 20 | MF | ECU | Juan Carlos Mongui |
| 23 | DF | CAN | Greg Hagedorn |
| 24 | MF | JAM | Marlon Dyke |
| 28 | FW | TOG | Yusif Jawando |
| 29 | MF | NOR | Gagan Natt |
| 30 | DF | JAM | Adrian Johnson |
| 31 | FW | BRA | Jorge da Silva |

== Head coaches ==
| Years | Name | Nation |
|---|---|---|
| 2001 | Paul Kitson (American soccer) | England |
| 2001 | Joe Da Silva | Canada |
| 2002 | Ed McLaughlin | Canada |
| 2002-2004 | Steve Nijjar | Canada |
| 2005 | Ken Dawson | Canada |
| 2005 | Milodrag Akmadzic | Croatia |
| 2006 | Paul Dhillon | England |

== Year-by-year ==
| Year | Division | League | Regular season | Playoffs |
|---|---|---|---|---|
| 2001 | 1 | CPSL | Eighth | Did not qualify |
| 2002 | 1 - Western Conference | CPSL | Sixth | Did not qualify |
| 2003 | 1 - Western Conference | CPSL | Second | Champions |
| 2004 | 1 - Western Conference | CPSL | Fourth | Wild Card Round |
| 2005 | 1 - Western Conference | CPSL | Sixth | Did not qualify |
| 2006 | 1 - National Division | CSL | Second | Quarter-Finals |

== Titles ==
- CPSL Championship: 1

2003
