= Ladislas Bushiri =

Congolese-Canadian soccer player

Personal information
- Full name: Ladislas Kikunda Bushiri
- Date of birth: 1 January 1986 (age 40)
- Place of birth: Goma, Zaire
- Height: 6 ft 4 in (1.93 m)
- Positions: Defender; midfielder

Youth career
- 2004–2007: Ottawa St. Anthony Italia
- 2004–2007: Algonquin Thunder

Senior career*
Years	Team	Apps	(Gls)
2007	Ottawa Fury	14	(0)
2007–2009	VfL Wolfsburg	0	(0)
2007–2008	→ Arminia Bielefeld (loan)		
2008–2009	Ottawa Fury	20	(4)
2009–2010	Persitara North Jakarta	6	(0)
2012	Los Angeles Blues	9	(0)

International career
- DR Congo U16
- DR Congo U18
- DR Congo U20
- * Club domestic league appearances and goals as of June 2, 2012

Ladislas Kikunda Bushiri (born 1 January 1986, in Goma, Zaire) is a Congolese-Canadian professional football player.

== Career ==
Bushiri signed for USL Professional Division club Los Angeles Blues on March 21, 2012.
