= Laryea Adjetey =

Ghanaian-born soccer player

Personal information
- Date of birth: 23 October 1973 (age 53)
- Place of birth: Ghana
- Height: 1.78 m (5 ft 10 in)
- Position: Midfielder

Senior career*
Years	Team	Apps	(Gls)
2000	Toronto Lynx	15	(0)
2001–2002	Brampton Hitmen		
Total		15+	(0+)
- * Club domestic league appearances and goals

Laryea Adjetey (born 24 October 1973) is a Ghanaian retired footballer who played in the USL A-League, and the Canadian Professional Soccer League.

== Club career ==
Adjetey began his professional career with the Toronto Lynx of the USL A-League in 2000. He helped Toronto finish third in the Northeast Division, and secured a postseason berth for the organization. He appeared in all playoff matches, and including the Eastern finals match against Rochester Rhinos, where the Lynx were eliminated by a score of 2–1 on goals on aggregate. The following season, he signed with expansion franchise the Brampton Hitmen of the Canadian Professional Soccer League. He played with Brampton for two seasons, but failed to reach the postseason with the franchise.
