= Osni Neto =

Brazilian footballer

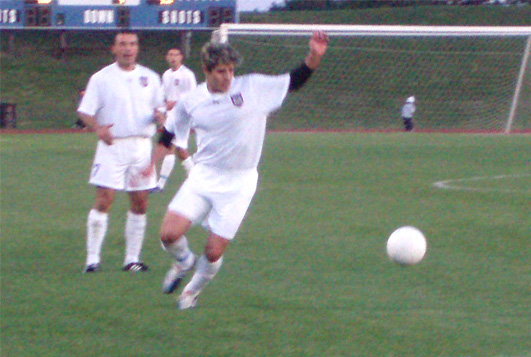
- Neto in 2007

Personal information
- Full name: Osni Purificação Neto
- Date of birth: April 16, 1979 (age 47)
- Place of birth: São Paulo, Brazil
- Height: 5 ft 9 in (1.75 m)
- Position: Midfielder

Senior career*
Years	Team	Apps	(Gls)
1997–1998	Palmeiras		
1999–2000	Remo		
2001–2003	Palmeiras	13	(2)
2001	→ Coritiba (loan)	2	(0)
2002	→ Santa Cruz (loan)		
2003	→ Mogi Mirim (loan)		
2004	Al-Merrikh		
2005	Vasco da Gama	2	(0)
2005	Inter de Limeira		
2006	Toronto Lynx	25	(5)
2007	Benfica Toronto	6	(1)
2007	Serbian White Eagles	16	(5)
2007–2008	New Jersey Ironmen (indoor)	16	(5)
2009	São Bento		
2009	Tocantins		

International career
1998–1999	Brazil U20		
- * Club domestic league appearances and goals

Osni Purificação Neto (born April 16, 1979) is a Brazilian retired soccer player who played as a midfielder. He also played at the international level with the Brazil national under-20 football team.

== Club career ==
=== Brazil ===
Neto began his career in 1998 with Palmeiras where he assisted the team in winning the 1998 Copa do Brasil against Cruzeiro. Shortly after he signed with Clube do Remo where he won the Campeonato Paraense state title in 1999. He returned to his former club Palmeiras in 2001 where he had several loan spells with various clubs throughout his tenure. His first loan spell was with Coritiba followed by Santa Cruz in 2002, and with Mogi Mirim in 2003.

In 2004, he played abroad in the Sudan Premier League with Al Merrikh. After a season in Sudan, he returned to Brazil to sign with Vasco da Gama. He only appeared in two matches with Vasco and shortly after signed with Inter de Limeira in the Campeonato Paulista.

After pursuing his career in North America for three years he returned to Brazil in 2009 to play with Esporte Clube São Bento and Tocantins Futebol Clube.

=== North America ===
Neto continued his career in the United States and had a trial match with the MetroStars. He would ultimately land a contract in the USL First Division with the Toronto Lynx in 2006. He made his debut for Toronto on April 29, 2006, against Vancouver Whitecaps. He would later record his first goal for Toronto in a 2–1 defeat to Portland Timbers on May 21, 2006. In his debut season with Toronto, he appeared in 26 matches and recorded five goals. He also helped Toronto in reaching the 2006 Open Canada Cup final where they were defeated by Ottawa St. Anthony Italia.

After the relegation of the Toronto Lynx to the USL Premier Development League in 2007, he played in the Canadian Soccer League with the Serbian White Eagles. During his time with the Eagles, he appeared in 16 games and scored five goals. In late 2007, he was drafted by the New Jersey Ironmen in the Major Indoor Soccer League expansion draft. He ultimately signed a contract with the club. In his debut season in indoor soccer, he appeared in 16 matches and scored five goals. After the conclusion of the season, he was waived from his contract in 2008.

== International career ==
He played with the Brazil national under-20 football team.
