= North York Astros =

Canadian soccer team

- Full name: North York Astros Soccer Club
- Nickname: The Astros
- Founded: November 23, 1990; 35 years ago (as North York Atletico Argentina Soccer Club)
- Stadium: Esther Shiner Stadium; Toronto, Ontario
- Capacity: 3,000
- League: Canadian Soccer League
- 2014: Regular season: 4th Playoffs: Lost in semi-finals
- Website: www.northyorkastros.ca
Home colours	Away colours

The North York Astros were a Canadian soccer team that was founded in 1990. The team initially played in the National Soccer League. The team played their home games at Esther Shiner Stadium in North York, a district of the city of Toronto, Canada. The team's colours were orange and black. The club was originally named North York Atletico Argentina Soccer Club, and witnessed instant success in its initial stages. After a merger with North York Talons, and a relocation to Scarborough the team was eventually renamed the North York Astros. The Astros were a founding member of the Canadian National Soccer League's successor league the Canadian Professional Soccer League in 1998.

North York's time in the CPSL (later renamed Canadian Soccer League) was marked with mixed results for example reaching the CPSL Championship finals then going through periods of consecutively failing to secure a postseason berth. In 2013, the Astros merged with Toronto Vasas organization to form Astros Vasas FC. The merger proved a success as the club rebuild itself and became a playoff contender. In 2014, the CSL lost sanctioning from the Canadian Soccer Association and North York withdrew from the league in 2015.

== History ==
=== Early years (1990–1997) ===
Founded on November 23, 1990, as the North York Atletico Argentina Soccer Club and accepted into membership by the National Soccer League Board to participate in the 1991 NSL season. Lamport Stadium served as the club's first home field. Elio Garro was appointed the club's first head coach. North York tasted success in their debut season as it went on to win the 1991 Peniche Pre-season Tournament over the North York Rockets of the Canadian Soccer League in penalty kicks after a 1–1 tie at Lamport Stadium, the 1991 NSL Ontario Cup over the Toronto Jets (2–0) and the NSL Canadian Cup Championship over the Montreal Dollard (3–2) at Claude Robillard Stadium in Montreal, Quebec.

In 1992, North York lost the Super Shield Cup Championship match to the Scarborough International Soccer Club by a score of 1–0. This NSL trophy was to determine the overall champion between the NSL League Champions and the NSL Canadian Cup Champions. For the second year in a row, the club reached the NSL Ontario Cup Finals but suffered a 2–1 defeat to Toronto Croatia.

In 1993, the NSL Board accepted North York Rockets and Winnipeg Fury of the defunct CSL, renamed itself The Canadian National Soccer League (CNSL) to denote the National Status awarded by the Canadian Soccer Association. As a result, The CNSL Board, decided to relocate North York to Scarborough as part of its realignment. The North York Atletico Argentina Soccer Club Board decided on the name of the Scarborough Astros Soccer Club to associate itself to the new city and selected Birchmount Stadium as their new home field. Changes also occurred with team management as Jorge Armua was named head coach. In 1995, the Astros roster consisted of three CNSL all-stars Paulo Silva, Rene Martin, Roosevelt Angulo, Rick Titus, Patrick Tobo and Iraqi international Basil Gorgis. Throughout the season the club achieved an undefeated run in the Umbro Cup tournament. In the Umbro Cup finals Scarborough faced St. Catharines Wolves, but suffered a loss in a penalty shootout. At the CNSL awards banquet Laszlo Martonfi received the Golden Boot award for finishing as the league's top goalscorer with 12 goals.

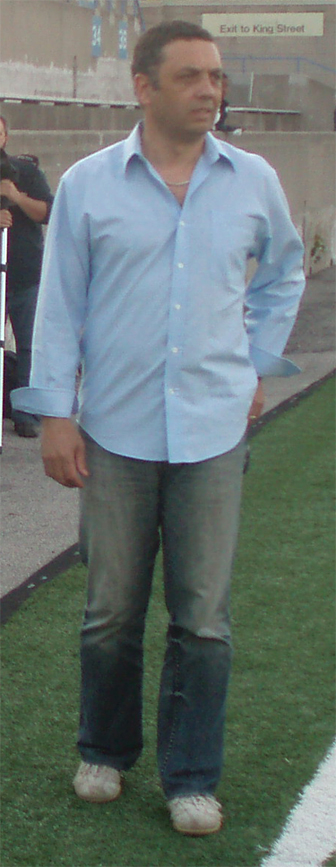
Rafael Carbajal coached the Astros from 1999 to 2000, and 2007–2008 until eventually joining the Canada men's national soccer team coaching staff.

=== Merger and CPSL founding member (1997–98) ===
In 1997, Scarborough Astros merged with North York Talons and combined both of their rosters together. One notable addition to the roster was the signing of Diego Maradona's younger brother Lalo Maradona. Unfortunately for the club midway through the season the CNSL board suspended North York, and Hamilton White Eagles for the remainder of the 1997 season. The following year the CNSL merged with the stillborn Ontario Professional Soccer League, and formed the Canadian Professional Soccer League. The newly formed CPSL Board accepted into membership as part of this merger, North York Talons, London City, Toronto Croatia and St. Catharines Roma and recognized them as Founding Members. The CPSL would operate under the auspices and joint support of the OSA. The CPSL Board then accepted four new clubs namely, Glen Shields, York Region Shooters, Mississauga Eagles and Toronto Olympians. North York later agreed as requested by the CPSL Board to relocate to the North York permanently and take on the name of North York Astros Soccer Club and Esther Shiner Stadium as their home field, to allow the Toronto Olympians to move into Scarborough and use Birchmount Stadium as their home field. In their debut season in the CPSL, the Astros qualified for the postseason by clinching the final playoff spot. In the postseason North York faced Toronto Olympians, but were defeated by a score of 5–1. At the CPSL awards banquet Rene Martin received the CPSL MVP award.

=== Decline and rebuilding period (1999–2006) ===
In 1999, the Astros hired the services of Rafael Carbajal as head coach. For the two seasons which he coached he assembled a roster of players with European and NPSL experience. The acquisitions were O'Neil Brown, Platon Krivoshchyokov, Piotr Libicz, Ivan Jurisic, Sam Medeiros, Andrei Malychenkov. The signings were of no avail as the Astros failed to clinch a postseason berth in both seasons. One notable achievement went to Libicz as he was awarded the CPSL Goalkeeper of the Year in 2000. In preparations for the 2001 season the Astros brought in Tony LaFerrara to coach the team. LaFerrara brought in former Montreal Impact striker Dejan Gluscevic, Luciano Miranda and appointed veteran Alex Nardi as team captain. After a mediocre performance LaFerrara was replaced by assistant coach Sam Medeiros. Though North York's performance improved from the previous season it was still not enough to secure a playoff berth. Luciano Miranda received the CPSL Goalkeeper of the Year, and Kurt Ramsey the CPSL Defender of the Year.

Former Astros striker Dejan Gluscevic along with Pavel Zaslavski were appointed the co-head coaches for the 2002 season. Added to the squad were Guillermo Compton Hall, Gabriel Salguero. During the regular season the Astros performed poorly and finished fifth in the Western Conference. They received a playoff wild card match due to hosting the competition. Their opponents in the Wild Card Game were league powerhouse Mississauga Olympians, and out played them by a score of 3–0. Their fairy tale continued in the semi-finals where they faced Western Conference champions Toronto Croatia, and once more beat the odds by winning on goal from Hall to cap off the match with a 1–0 victory. In the CPSL Championship finals North York faced Eastern Conference champions Ottawa Wizards, but fell short in capturing the title by losing by a score of 2–0. At the conclusion of the season Compton Hall received the CPSL Championship MVP, and Bruno Ierullo was awarded the CPSL President's award.

For the 2003 season Zaslavski received full head coach responsibilities, and signed former Toronto Lynx forward Francisco Dos Santos, Vitaliy Mishchenko, and Boris Krimus. The season concluded in another mediocre performance with the club finishing fifth in the Western Conference, and failing to secure a postseason berth. The 2003 season marked a rebuilding period for the club. Notable achievements which occurred during their rebuilding stage were Ierullo receiving his second President's award in 2004. In 2005, Gluscevic returned to coach the Astros once more, and managed to secure a postseason wild card match. In the match North York faced Toronto Croatia, but were eliminated from the competition by a score of 1–0. At the CPSL awards ceremony Gluscevic received the CPSL Coach of the Year, and North York was awarded the CPSL Fair Play Award.

=== Carbajal period (2007–08) ===
The 2007 season marked the return of Rafael Carbajal as head coach. His signings included former USL veteran David Diplacido, Haidar Al-Shaïbani, Selvin Lammie, and Diego Maradona (son of Lalo Maradona). Carbajal succeed in improving the team's performance, as the Astros qualified for the postseason for the first time since the 1998 season without the assistance of a bye to the playoffs. Their opponents in the first round of the playoffs were Toronto Croatia, after a 2–0 lead Croatia bounced back with four goals to eliminate North York from the competition. Team owner Ierullo was awarded the Harry Paul Gauss award for the third time in his career. In preparation for the 2008 season Carbajal reinforced his roster with the signings of Bahamian international Happy Hall, Go Nagaoka, Franco Lalli, Carlos Zeballos, and Anthony Bahadur. North York produced a fruitful season finishing as runner's up in the National Division, the club's highest finish in the CSL regular season. In the quarterfinals the Astros faced the Serbian White Eagles, but suffered a 2–1 defeat. CSL Coach of the Year went to Carbajal, and Zeballos received the Defender of the Year.

=== Postseason drought and merger (2009–2014) ===
After the departure of Carbajal the Astros went through a difficult rebuilding era. North York went through the services of Uğur Çimen, Vladimir Klinovsky, Michael Ridout, and Gerardo Lezcano as head coaches. For four straight seasons the Astros finished at the bottom of the table. In 2010, the Astros reached an agreement with North York Hearts SC to serve as a feeder club. In May 2013 the club merged with Toronto Vasas organization to form Astros Vasas FC.László Kiss with experience in European soccer was appointed the new head coach. The Astros received additional reinforcements after acquiring the player rights from the Mississauga Eagles. Kiss assembled a roster of which consisted of Joey Melo, Igor Pisanjuk, and Erik Ľupták. In the initial stages of the season the team struggled to achieve results, which resulted in the replacement of Kiss with Lezcano as head coach. Lezcano managed to achieve enough results in order to make one last bold attempt at a postseason berth. Unfortunately the Astros fell short by one point in order to secure the final playoff berth.

In 2014, Josef Komlodi was appointed the head coach, and brought in CSL veterans like Gabe Gala, Boris Miličić, Mark Jankovic, and Jason Lopes. Midway through the season Komlodi resigned, and Igor Pisanjuk served in the capacity of player-coach. Pisanjuk managed the Astros to a postseason berth by finishing fourth in the overall standings. In the postseason the club faced Burlington SC, and advanced to the semi-finals by a 4–0 victory. In the second round of the playoffs North York faced York Region Shooters, but suffered a 1–0 defeat. On February 28, 2015, the CSL announced that North York, and Kingston FC were not returning for the 2015 season.

== Awards ==
- 1991 Peniche Pre-season Champions
- 1991 NSL Ontario Cup Champions
- 1991 Canada Cup Champions
- 1992 NSL Ontario Cup Runners Up
- 1992 NSL Super Shield Runners Up
- 1995 CNSL Ontario Cup Runners Up
- 2002 CPSL Rogers Cup Runners Up

== Kit ==
The colours in the kit have changed over the years. Yellow and Navy Blue where prominent and in 2010 the Club added Orange and Black to commemorate its 20th anniversary.

== Notable players ==
Canada

- Anthony Adur (2008)
- Haidar Al-Shaïbani (2006–07)
- Tomer Chencinski (2007)
- Sergio De Luca (2009)
- David Diplacido (2007)
- Gabe Gala (2014)
- Victor Gallo (2009–10)
- Felix Gelt
- Evan James (2013)
- Franco Lalli (2008)
- Joey Melo (2013–14)
- David Monsalve (2008–09)
- Peyvand Mossavat (2007)
- Dominic Oppong (2009)
- Igor Pisanjuk (2013–14)
- Matt Silva (2014)
- Gil Vainshtein
- Nelson Ryan Zamora (2010)

Angola

- Edgar Bartolomeu (1998)

Argentina

- Juan Cruz Real (2009)
- Raúl Maradona (1997)
- Gabriel Salguero (2002–05)

Bahamas

- Happy Hall (2008)

Brazil

- Francisco Dos Santos (2003–04)
- Paulo Silva (1990–95), (2003)

Cameroon

- Patrick Tobo (1994–96)

Grenada

- Davier Walcott (2012)

Guyana

- Konata Mannings (2009)

Iraq

- Basil Gorgis (1995)

Israel

- Alon Badat (2009)

Namibia

- Maleagi Ngarizemo (2012)

Russia

- Boris Krimus (2003–06)
- Platon Krivoshchyokov (2000)
- Andrei Malychenkov (2000–04)

Serbia

- Dejan Gluščević (2001–02)
- Ivan Jurisic (1998–99)
- Boris Miličić (2014)

Trinidad and Tobago

- Rick Titus (1995)

Ukraine

- Vladimir Koval (2000)
- Vitaliy Mishchenko (2006)

Uruguay

- Rafael Carbajal (1998)

== Year-by-year ==
Year	Division	League	Regular season (Position, W-L-D, Pts)	Playoffs
1991	First (as North York Atletico Argentina)	NSL	3rd, 24 Pts	ONTARIO & CANADA CUP CHAMPIONS
1992	First (as North York Atletico Argentina)	NSL		ONTARIO CUP FINALIST & NSL SUPER SHIELD FINALIST
1993	First (as Scarborough Astros)	CNSL		
1994	First (as Scarborough Astros)	CNSL		
1995	First (as Scarborough Astros)	CNSL		ONTARIO CUP FINALIST
1996	First (as Scarborough Astros)	CNSL	7th, 0–10–2, 2 Pts	did not qualify
1997	First (as North York Tallons)	CNSL		
1998	First (as North York Astros)	CPSL	4th, 6–7–1, 19 Pts	Semi-Finals
1999	First	CPSL	8th, 2–11–1, 7 Pts	did not qualify
2000	First	CPSL	6th, 3–9–2, 11 Pts	did not qualify
2001	First	CPSL	9th, 7–3–12, 24 Pts	did not qualify
2002	Western	CPSL	5th, 4–6–9, 18 Pts	ROGERS CUP FINALIST
2003	Western	CPSL	5th, 4–5–9, 17 Pts	did not qualify
2004	Eastern	CPSL	4th, 3–13–4, 13 Pts	did not qualify
2005	Eastern	CPSL	5th, 8–10–4, 28 Pts	Wild Card Round
2006	National	CSL	6th, 3–11–8, 17 Pts	did not qualify
2007	National	CSL	3rd, 5–12–5, 20 Pts	First Round Play-offs
2008	National	CSL	2nd 10–3–9, 33 Pts	First Round Play-offs
2009	National	CSL	5th	did not qualify
2010	First	CSL	11th	did not qualify
2011	First	CSL	14th	did not qualify
2012	First	CSL	16th	did not qualify
2013	First	CSL	9th	did not qualify
2014	First	CSL	4th	Semifinals

== Head coaches ==
Years	Name	Nation
1991–1992	Elio Garro	Argentina
1993–1998	Jorge Armua	Uruguay
1999–2000	Rafael Carbajal	Uruguay
2001	Tony Laferrara	Canada
2001	Sam Medeiros	Portugal
2002	Pavel Zaslavski & Dejan Gluščević	Belarus & Serbia
2003	Pavel Zaslavski	Belarus
2004	Vittorio Villacis	Ecuador
2005	Dejan Gluščević	Serbia
2006	Pavel Zaslavski	Belarus
2007–2008	Rafael Carbajal	Uruguay
2009	Uğur Çimen	Turkey
2009	Volodymyr Klynovskyi	Ukraine
2010	Michael Ridout	Canada
2010–2012	Gerardo Lezcano	Canada
2013	László Kiss (manager)	Hungary
2013	Gerardo Lezcano	Canada
2014	Josef Komlodi	Hungary
2014	Igor Pisanjuk	Canada
