= Eris Tafaj =

Albanian footballer

Personal information
- Full name: Ervis Tafaj
- Date of birth: 10 September 1980 (age 46)
- Place of birth: Albania
- Position: Forward

Youth career
- Partizani FK

College career
Years	Team	Apps	(Gls)
2000	Oakland Golden Grizzlies		
2001–2002	Detroit Mercy Titans	38	(12)

Senior career*
Years	Team	Apps	(Gls)
2003–2005	London City		
2005–2006	Shkumbini	8	(0)
2006	London City		
2011	London City		
- * Club domestic league appearances and goals

Eris Tafaj (born September 10, 1980) is an Albanian former footballer who played in the Canadian Professional/Soccer League, and Albanian Superliga. He is currently a trainer and coach with Eurostar Football Academy and Elite Development Soccer Academy.

== Playing career ==
Tafaj played at the youth level with Partizani FK, but ultimately settled in Canada at the age of 14. In 2000, he began to play at the college level with the Oakland Golden Grizzlies. In 2001, he transferred to play with the Detroit Titans. In 2003, he played in the Canadian Professional Soccer League with London City. Throughout the 2003 season he helped London secure the Open Canada Cup, where he successfully registered a goal in the penalty shoot-out. At the conclusion of the season he finished as the club's top goalscorer, and team MVP.

In 2005, he was selected for the CPSL All-Star team against Glasgow Rangers. After leading London in the scoring charts he was transferred to KS Shkumbini in the Albanian Superliga. After a season abroad he returned to London, and was selected for the second time to the CSL All-Star team against Clyde F.C. In the middle of the season he departed from the club, but would eventually return for the 2011 season.

== Managerial career ==
After retiring from professional he was recruited by former London City head coach Luka Shaqiri as a staff coach for Eurostar Football Academy. Along with former teammate Isa Bulku he formed Elite Development Soccer Academy.

== Honors ==
London City

- Open Canada Cup (1): 2003
