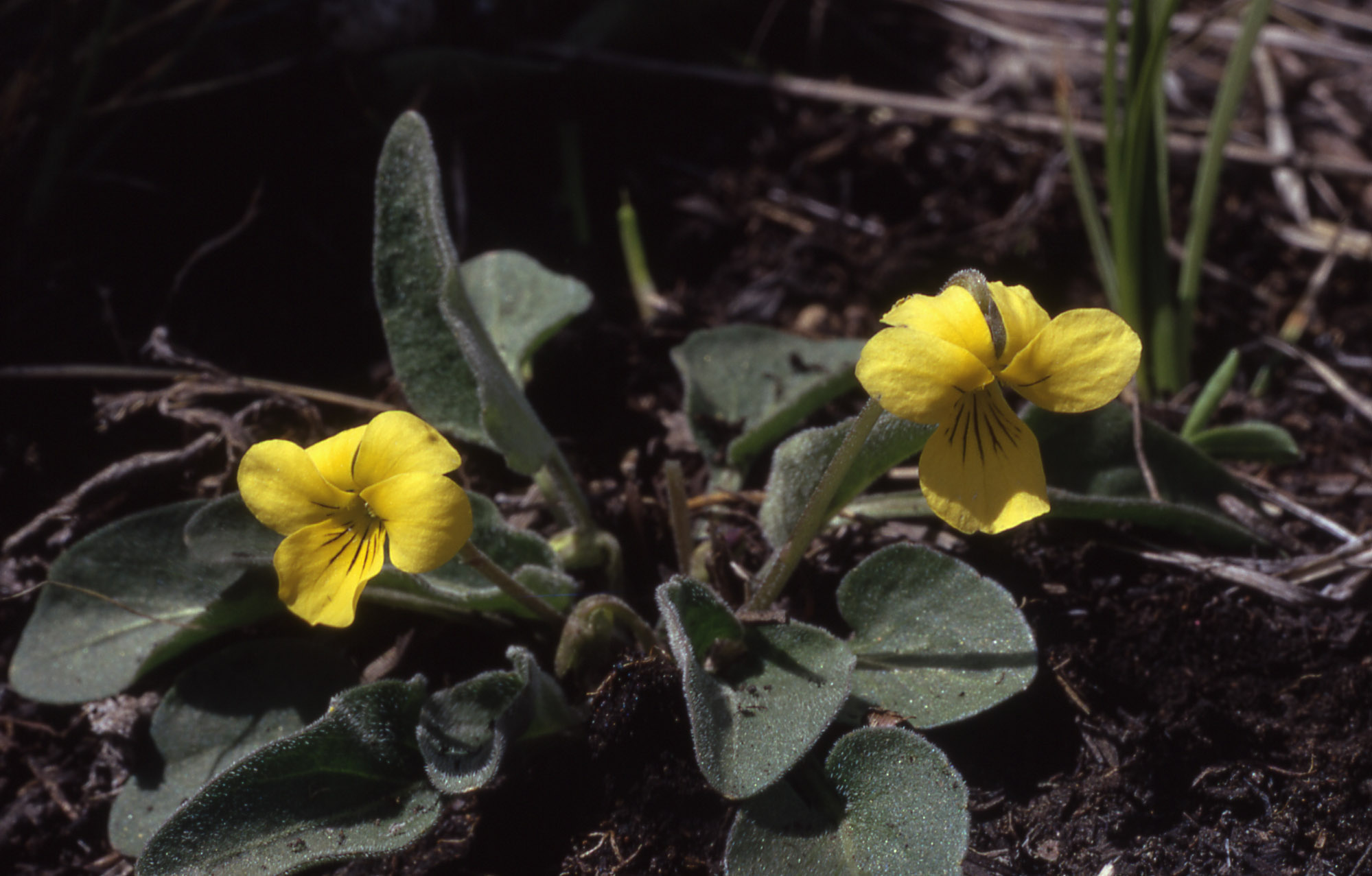

Scientific classification
- Kingdom: Plantae
- Clade: Tracheophytes
- Clade: Angiosperms
- Clade: Eudicots
- Clade: Rosids
- Order: Malpighiales
- Family: Violaceae
- Genus: Viola
- Species: V. vallicola

Binomial name
- Viola vallicola A.Nels.

= Viola vallicola =

Sagebrush violet

Species of flowering plant

Viola vallicola, the sagebrush violet, yellow sagebrush violet or valley violet, is a perennial plant in the Violet family (Violaceae). It is native to Western and Central North America.

Varieties of sagebrush violet include:

- Viola vallicola A. Nelson var. major (Hook.) Fabijan
- Viola vallicola A. Nelson var. vallicola
