= Paul Munster =

Northern Irish footballer and coach

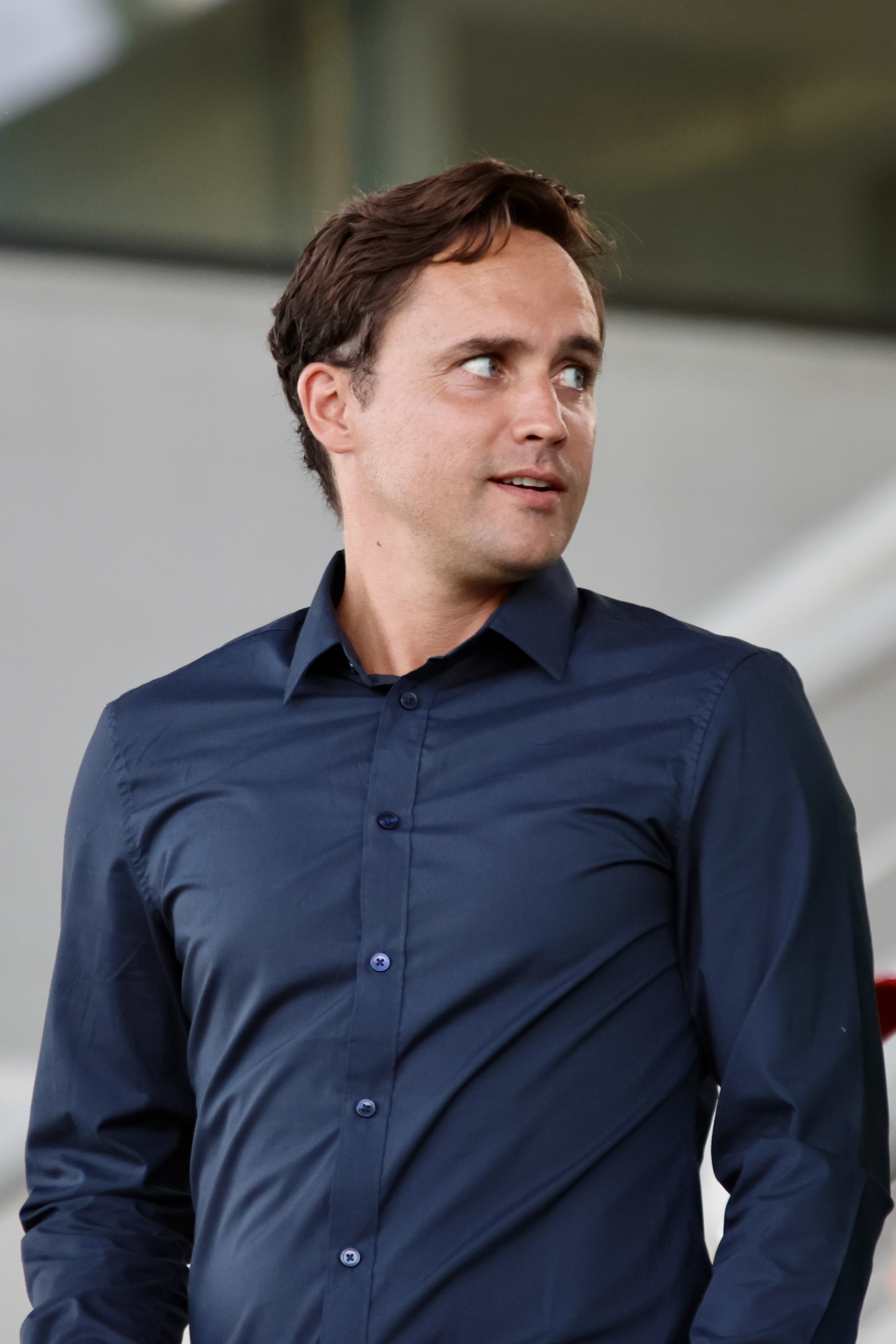
- Munster in 2022

Personal information
- Date of birth: 9 February 1982 (age 44)
- Place of birth: Belfast, Northern Ireland
- Position: Striker

Youth career
- –2001: Cliftonville

Senior career*
Years	Team	Apps	(Gls)
2004	London City	19	(25)
2004–2005	Slavia Prague	3	(0)
2006	Örebro SK	7	(2)
2006	Bunkeflo IF	3	(3)
2007	Hradec Králové	11	(10)
2008–2011	Linfield	79	(25)
2011	Anker Wismar	4	(0)

Managerial career
- 2012: Assyriska BK
- 2013: Örebro Syrianska IF
- 2014–2016: BK Forward
- 2016–2017: Örebro SK U19
- 2018–2019: Minerva Academy (Technical Director)
- 2019: Vanuatu
- 2019–2022: Bhayangkara
- 2022–2023: Brunei (Technical Director)
- 2024–2025: Persebaya Surabaya
- 2025–2026: Bhayangkara Presisi
- * Club domestic league appearances and goals

Paul Munster (born 9 February 1982) is a Northern Irish professional football manager and former professional footballer who played as a striker. He is recently the head coach of Liga 1 club Bhayangkara Presisi.

== Playing career ==
Munster began his career at youth level with Cliftonville in 2001. He traveled to Kitchener, Ontario in order to conduct a six-week sport and school exchange to coach. While conducting lessons he severely torn his knee ligament. As a result, his club released him from his contract effectively sidelining his career. He returned to Canada in 2004 in order to assist Eddie Edgar with his coaching academy. Edgar secured him a trial with London City of the Canadian Professional Soccer League. After a successful trial he played with club's reserve squad, where he scored 12 goals in 3 matches to promote him to the first team.

He made his debut on 18 June 2004 against Metro Lions, where he scored in his debut in a 2–1 defeat. What followed was a stellar season where he became an instant success by finishing as the league's top goalscorer with 25 goals in 19 appearances. The league recognized his contributions with the CPSL Rookie of the Year award. After an impressive debut season in the CPSL he was signed by Slavia Prague of the Czech First League. He became the first Irishman to play in the league when he made his debut on 21 November 2004 against FK Chmel Blšany.

After one season with Slavia Prague where he appeared in 3 league matches and voted fans player of the month. In 2006, he went to Scandinavia to sign with Örebro SK of the Superettan. Midway through the season he was transferred to Bunkeflo IF in the Division 1, where he assisted in promoting the club to the Superettan.

He returned to the Czech Republic to play with SK Hradec Kralove in the Czech National Football League. He finished as the club's top goalscorer with 10 goals. In 2008, he returned home to sign with Linfield in the Irish League Premiership. In his first season with Linfield the lethal striker scored an impressive 17 goals in 20 starts. Throughout his tenure with Linfield he won the league title and Irish Cup in 2009/10 and 2010/11, and was the club's top goalscorer in the 2009/2010 season.

In January 2011 Linfield rejected an offer from Hellas Verona of the Lega Pro. The offer was turned down by the Belfast club, even though Munster was leaving in the summer as a free agent. After his contract expired he signed with FC Anker Wismar in the NOFV-Oberliga Nord.

== Managerial career ==
=== Sweden clubs ===
In 2012, Munster retired from competitive football in order to manage Assyriska BK in the Swedish Football Division 2. The following season he was appointed manager of Örebro Syrianska IF in the Division 1. In 2014, he was given managerial responsibilities at BK Forward, and was appointed head coach of the Örebro SK under-19 team.

=== Minerva Punjab ===
On 8 August 2018, Munster was appointed Technical Director and Head Coach for Indian I-League club Minerva Punjab. Munster won the Punjab Super State League for the first time in the clubs history after going undefeated in 11 games, adding a 2nd trophy winning the J&K Invitational cup. On 8 February 2019, he announced his resignation, citing personal reasons.

=== Vanuatu ===
On 24 February 2019, Munster was named the head coach for the Vanuatu national football team.

=== Bhayangkara FC ===
Eight months later, he was offered a contract to manage Bhayangkara F.C. in the Indonesian Liga 1, and he was appointed as their new coach on 1 September 2019.

Arriving halfway through the season with the club in 13th place, Munster managed to finish the season in 4th place and as Siem Reap Super Asia Cup Champions, beating Malaysian club Petaling Jaya City 2–1 in the final in Cambodia. Arriving halfway through the season with the club in 13th place, Munster managed to finish the season in 4th place and as Siem Reap Super Asia Cup Champions, beating Malaysian club Petaling Jaya City 2–1 in the final in Cambodia.

The 2021–22 Season was Munster's final season with the club, finishing in 3rd place, and qualifying for the AFC Cup. The 2021–22 Season was Munster's final season with the club, finishing in 3rd place, and qualifying for the AFC Cup. Munster left Bhayangkara on 31 March 2022, after his contract wasn't renewed.

=== Brunei ===
On 17 August 2022, Munster was unveiled as the new technical director of the Brunei national football team. Under his watch, Brunei managed to qualify for the 2022 AFF Championship for the first time in 26 years.

=== Persebaya Surabaya ===
In winter of 2024, he returned to the Indonesian top-tier by becoming the manager for Persebaya Surabaya sitting in mid table. Munster 2025 Season resulted in Top 4 Position.

=== Return to Bhayangkara ===
On 19 June 2025, Munster returned to become the head coach of Bhayangkara Presisi. In the summer of 2026, Bhayangkara Presisi a promotion team from Liga 2 terminated Munster's 2 Year contract after leading them to a fifth place finish last season. Munster was nominated for Coach of the Year.

== Managerial statistics ==
As of 30 June 2026

Managerial record by team and tenure
Team	Nat.	From	To	Record					Ref.
Team	Nat.	From	To	G	W	D	L	Win %	Ref.
Örebro	(Sweden)	1 July 2012	31 October 2012	15	5	3	7	33.33	
Vanuatu U20	(Vanuatu)	24 February 2019	31 August 2019	3	1	0	2	33.33	
Vanuatu	(Vanuatu)	24 February 2019	31 August 2019	8	3	2	3	37.50	
Bhayangkara	(Indonesia)	1 September 2019	1 April 2022	57	30	18	9	52.63	
Persebaya Surabaya	(Indonesia)	1 January 2024	25 May 2025	45	18	15	12	40.00	
Bhayangkara	(Indonesia)	19 June 2025	30 June 2026	34	16	5	13	47.06	
Career Total				162	73	43	46	45.06	

== Honours ==
As player

Linfield

- Irish League Championship: 3
  - 2007–08, 2009–10, 2010–11
- Irish Cup: 2
  - 2009–10, 2010–11

Individual

- Linfield Player of the Year: 2008–09
- Canadian Professional Soccer League Golden Boot: 2004
- Canadian Professional Soccer League Rookie of the Year: 2004

As coach

- Nominated for Coach of the Year 2026
- Siem Reap Super Asia Cup 2020
- Tri Nations League 2019
- Punjab Super League 2018
- J&K Invitational Cup 2018
- Swedish Cup U-19 called " Svenska Cupen" in 2017 with Örebro Sportklubb U-19
- Best Irish Coach of abroad 2016-2017

Individual

- Liga 1 Coach of the Month: September 2024
