= Paul Victor =

Paul Victor may refer to:

- Paul Ben-Victor (born 1965), American actor
- Paul-Émile Victor (1907–1995), French ethnologist and explorer
- Paul Victor (footballer) (born 1984), Dominican footballer
