= Nenad Nikolić (footballer, born 1984) =

Serbian footballer

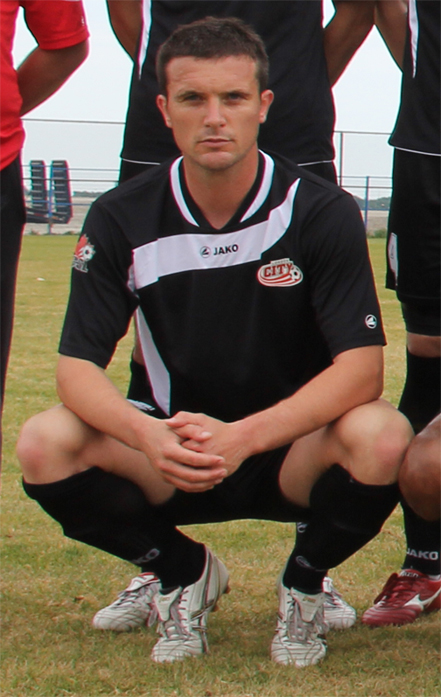
- Nikolić in 2012

Personal information
- Full name: Nenad Nikolić
- Date of birth: 12 August 1984 (age 42)
- Place of birth: Belgrade, SFR Yugoslavia
- Height: 1.85 m (6 ft 1 in)
- Position: Centre-back

Youth career
- 1994–2002: Red Star Belgrade

Senior career*
Years	Team	Apps	(Gls)
2002–2005	Red Star Belgrade	0	(0)
2002–2003	→ Big Bull (loan)	15	(2)
2003–2005	→ Jedinstvo Surčin (loan)	38	(9)
2005–2006	Apollon Athens	12	(1)
2006–2007	BASK Belgrade	34	(3)
2007–2008	Zemun	21	(1)
2008–2009	Vasas Budapest	17	(0)
2010–2011	Inter Zaprešić	16	(0)
2012	London City	22	(4)
2013–2016	Burlington SC	53	(12)
2016–2019	Brantford Galaxy	33	(5)
- * Club domestic league appearances and goals as of 10 October 2016

Nenad Nikolić (Serbian Cyrillic: Ненад Николић; born 12 August 1984) is a Serbian retired footballer who played as a defender.

== Playing career ==
Nikolić began his youth career in 1994 with Red Star Belgrade in the famed 1984 generation which produced the likes of Dušan Basta, Dragan Mrđa, Boško Janković, Dejan Milovanović and Marko Perović. In 2002, he was promoted to the senior side but did not feature in official matches. Due to their similar playing style, he was nicknamed Žonsa after Polish footballer Tomasz Rząsa.

Throughout his career in Europe, he played in Serbia with the likes of FK Big Bull Radnički, FK Jedinstvo Surčin, FK BASK, FK Zemun. He played in the Croatian First Football League with NK Inter Zaprešić. He also played in the top flight of football in Hungary with Vasas SC, and played in the Football League with Apollon Smyrnis

In 2012, he went overseas to Canada to sign with London City of the Canadian Soccer League. In 2013, he signed with expansion franchise Burlington SC. He played with Burlington for three seasons, and qualified for postseason in two seasons. After the departure of Burlington from the CSL he signed with Brantford Galaxy for the 2016 season.

== Managerial career ==
In 2012, he served as an assistant coach for London City SC in the Canadian Soccer League, and later with Burlington SC from 2013 till 2016. In 2017, he became associated with Burlington SC Academy as the Junior Technical Director.
