= Nenad Begović =

Serbian footballer (born 1980)

Nenad Begović Ненад Беговић
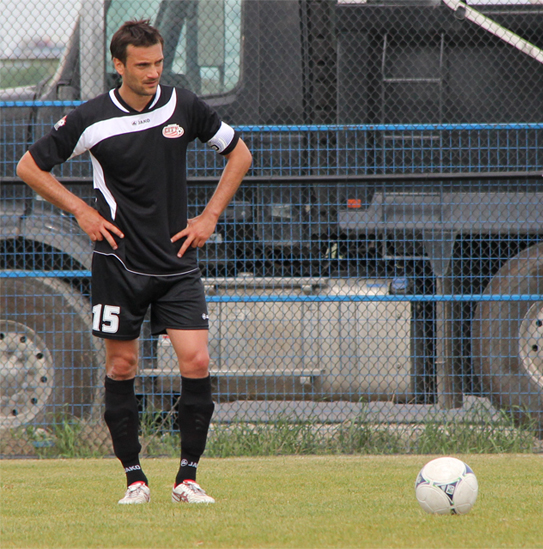
- Begović with London City in 2012

Personal information
- Full name: Nenad Begović
- Date of birth: January 6, 1980 (age 46)
- Place of birth: Belgrade, SFR Yugoslavia
- Height: 1.83 m (6 ft 0 in)
- Position: Midfielder

Youth career
- OFK Beograd

Senior career*
Years	Team	Apps	(Gls)
1998–2001	OFK Beograd	75	(2)
2002–2003	Radnički Beograd		
2004	Mladenovac		
2005	Sète	3	(0)
2005–2006	Romorantin	18	(1)
2006	Interblock	13	(1)
2007	Baulmes	9	(0)
2007	Kairat	12	(1)
2008	Luch Vladivostok	4	(0)
2009	Ashdod	3	(0)
2010	Simurq	4	(0)
2010–2012	Brantford Galaxy		
2012–2013	London City		
2013–2014	Zemun		
2015	PSM Makassar	0	(0)

Managerial career
- 2012: London City (player-coach)
- * Club domestic league appearances and goals

Nenad Begović (Serbian Cyrillic: Ненад Беговић; born January 6, 1980) is a Serbian retired football midfielder. He played in the First League of Serbia and Montenegro, Second League of Serbia and Montenegro, Ligue 1, Kazakhstan Premier League, Russian Premier League, Azerbaijan Premier League, Israeli Premier League, Canadian Soccer League, Serbian First League, and the Indonesia Super League.

== Career ==
=== Club career ===
Begović began his career in the First League of FR Yugoslavia with OFK Beograd and had stints with FK Radnički Beograd, and OFK Mladenovac. In 2005, he went abroad to France to play in the Ligue 2 with FC Sète 34. The following year he played with NK Interblock, and FC Baulmes. In 2007, he signed with FC Kairat of the Kazakhstan Premier League, and he had a stint in Russia with FC Luch Vladivostok. He also played with F.C. Ashdod, and Simurq PIK in the Israeli Premier League, and Azerbaijan Premier League.

In 2010, he went to Canada to sign with Brantford Galaxy of the Canadian Soccer League. In his debut season he helped Brantford win their first CSL Championship. In 2012, he signed with rivals London City, and was appointed club captain. During his time with London he helped the club reach the postseason in 2013 for the first time since the 2000 season. After the conclusion of the CSL season he returned to Serbia to sign with FK Zemun of the Serbian First League. In 2015, he signed with PSM Makassar of the Indonesia Super League.

=== International career ===
Begović received five call-ups to the FR Yugoslavia under-21 side under coach Nikola Rakojević during the 2002 UEFA European Under-21 Championship qualification rounds from 2000 to 2001.

== Managerial career ==
After the sudden departure of London City manager Stanislav Zvezdić, the coaching responsibilities were given to Begović in a player/coach role. He took the team from the bottom of the standings and transformed them into a playoff contender. Despite the change in performance, London still missed the final playoff berth by five points.
