= London City Soccer Club =

Canadian soccer team

- Full name: London City Soccer Club
- Nickname: City
- Founded: 14 February 1973; 45 years ago
- Stadium: Milton Community Sports Park; Milton, Ontario
- Capacity: 5,000
- Owner: Jasmin Halkić
- Coach: Ivan Jevtic
- League: Canadian Academy of Soccer League
- 2019: Regular season: 4th
- Website: http://www.londoncity.ca/
Home colours	Away colours

London City Soccer Club is a Canadian soccer team founded in 1973. The team is currently a member of the Canadian Academy of Soccer League. The team plays their home games at the Milton Community Sports Park in the town of Milton, Ontario. The team's colours are red, black and white. Formed on Valentine's Day of 1973 by Markus Gauss in order to field a London entry for the National Soccer League after the departure of German Canadian FC. The Gauss family ran and provided the city of London a professional team for 38 years. Under their tutelage the club was most notable for providing an opportunity for young players to develop in a professional environment.

In 1998, London became a charter member for the Canadian Professional Soccer League. In the initial stages of the new league City managed to compete several times for a postseason berth. Shortly after the club went through a difficult rebuilding stage as a result missed the playoffs for twelve consecutive seasons. Their biggest success came in 2003 when they captured the Open Canada Cup. After the loss of Harry Gauss to cancer and the higher playing standards placed by the league the Gauss family decided to sell the club. The new ownership of Andrew Crowe and Zoran Kliseric brought an end to London's postseason drought and qualified for the playoffs in 2013. After four years of ownership both Crowe and Kliseric sold their shares ultimately to former general manager Jasmin Halkic who relegated the club to the Second Division in 2016 in order to serve as a reserve team for Milton SC.

== History ==
=== Early years (1973–97) ===
On February 14, 1973, former German Canadian FC vice-president Markus Gauss purchased the club's franchise rights to form London City SC in order to compete in the National Soccer League. Gauss would serve as the club's president, while his son Harry Gauss managed the day-to-day operations. Cove Road Stadium would serve as the club's original home venue. In their debut season in the NSL the team finished seventh out of sixteen teams in the standings. During their first NSL run the Middlesex County team was a regular playoff contender with their best league performance occurring in the 1980 season with a fifth-place finishing.

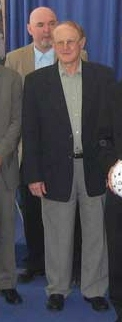
Harry Gauss (left) beside St. Catharines Wolves general manager Armand Di Fruscio. For 38 years Gauss played an instrumental role in the daily activities of club.

In 1983, London City departed from the league with London Marconi succeeding them. London returned to the professional ranks in 1990 after purchasing from London Marconi's their NSL franchise rights. After the demise of the Canadian Soccer League two of their teams Winnipeg Fury, and North York Rockets joined the NSL which resulted in the renaming of the league to the Canadian National Soccer League. Their return marked a new philosophical approach in the club's direction by providing an opportunity for young local players to make the transition to the professional level. During their second stint in the league London received several individual team awards as the Most Disciplined Team and John Bottineau receiving the CNSL Rookie of the Year in 1995. In 1997, London secured their first postseason berth since their return to the CNSL. Their opponents in the first round were Kosova Albanians with goals coming from Pete Paterson, John Williams, and Howard Buchanan to give London a 3–0 victory in the first series. In the second series Kosova won the match 2–1, and advanced to the next round after scoring an overtime goal. Prominent players during the club's CNSL days were Canadian international Frank Sauer, Gert Dörfel, Jurek Gebczynski, Eddie Edgar, Kenrick Emanuel, Nick Bontis, Euclid Bertrand, Anthony Dominique, and Andrew Loague.

=== CPSL founding member (1998–01) ===
In 1998, the CNSL merged with the Ontario Soccer Association's attempted Ontario Professional Soccer League and formed the Canadian Professional Soccer League. London was a charter member along with three other CNSL clubs and four new expansion franchises. London's debut season saw the team finish sixth in the standings only missing the final playoff berth by four points. At the conclusion of the season Tom Bianchi received the CPSL Rookie of the Year award, while the club won the CPSL Fairplay award. The following season the Gauss family handed the head coach responsibilities to Tony Laferrara, where he managed to secure the final playoff berth. In the preliminary round of the postseason London faced regular season champions Toronto Olympians, but were eliminated from the competition after a 4–1 defeat. For his achievement the league recognized Laferrara with the Coach of the Year award and for the fourth straight year London City produced another Rookie of the Year this time to Semir Mesanovic.

The 2000 season saw the departure of Laferrara to the North York Astros with the head coaching duties returning to Harry Gauss. Though City finished last in the standings they were granted a wildcard berth due to hosting the playoffs and CPSL Championship. In the wildcard match London faced the Glen Shields Sun Devils, after a 1–1 draw the match went to penalties where the Sun Devils won 4–3. In preparation for the 2001 season Gauss relinquished his coaching duties to former player Jurek Gebczynski. Throughout the season London struggled to achieve sufficient results and as a result finished at the bottom of the standings for the second straight season. For the next several years London would go through a difficult rebuilding period in order to focus more solely on player development which produced several positive outcomes, but caused the club a playoff drought for twelfth straight seasons.

=== Open Canada Cup & hard times (2002–09) ===
In 2002, London was selected for the first time to host the Canada Cup, which granted them a wildcard berth. Their opposition in the wildcard match was against Ottawa Wizards, but were defeated 3–0. The 2003 season was a notable one with Harry Gauss once again adding coaching to his list of responsibilities, and appointed Paul Hillman the team captain. Gauss brought in Albanian imports Gentian Buzali, Albi Mile, Isa Bulku, Ervin Ryta, and former veteran Andrew Loague. While the regular season was a disappointment by finishing last in the Western Conference. London on the other hand had a remarkable Open Canada Cup tournament. Though London was eliminated in the quarterfinals of the tournament as the host club they received a wildcard match to the next round. In the wildcard match City faced the Durham Flames, and with goals from Murataj, Loague, and Eris Tafaj the team advanced to the semifinals in a 4–1 victory. In the semifinals London faced amateur club Kanata, and won the match 2–0 with Erik Elmauer and Phil McDonald contributing the goals. Their opponents in the finals were the Metro Lions during the match London took the lead with Eris Tafaj providing the goal, while Lions equalized in the 84' minute to send the game to a penalty shootout with London winning the tournament 4–2 in penalties. The victory was a historic achievement for London as it marked their first piece of silverware and a $10,000 prize.

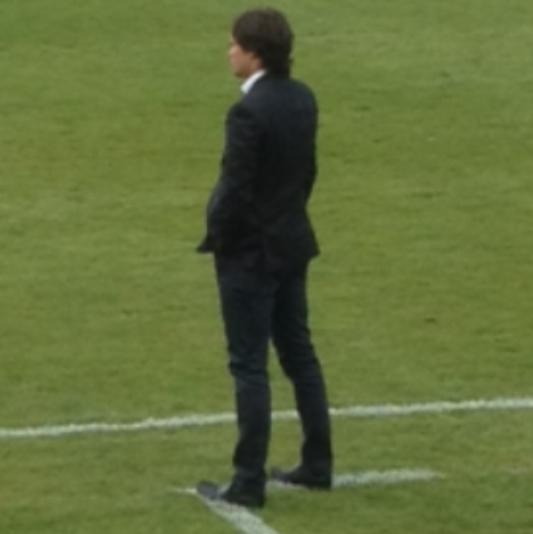
Paul Munster began his career with London before going overseas to Europe.

Gauss managed to improve his team's performance for the 2004 season, but still fell short of a playoff berth by two points. They also failed to defend their Open Canada Cup title, after a 2–1 loss by last year's finalist the Metro Lions in the wildcard match. One notable achievement for City was accomplished by rookie Paul Munster who finished as the league\s top goalscorer, and was recognized by the league as the Rookie of the Year. As a result, Munster was signed by Slavia Prague of the Czech First League. On November 12, 2004 North London Soccer Club merged with London City in order to create a pipeline for young local players to move up to the professional level with Martin Painter as the technical director.

Their postseason drought continued in 2005 as London missed the final playoff berth by six points. In the Open Canada Cup tournament London successfully challenged for the title by reaching the finals without the use of wildcard match. Their opponents were defending champions Windsor Border Stars, who successfully defended their title by a score of 3–0. Haidar Al-Shaïbani was awarded the Goalkeeper of the Year and Dennis Peeters received the Rookie of the Year. Founder Markus Gauss was inducted into the London Sports Hall of the Fame as their first soccer inductee. London didn't fare better in the 2006 season finishing at the bottom.

The club suffered a major setback in 2007 as general manager/head coach Harry Gauss was diagnosed with cancer. In order to fully recover he relieved his administrative and managerial duties to son Ryan Gauss and family friend Josie Storto, while his older son Sean Gauss handled the coaching responsibilities. City's on field performance continued its decline as it finished last in its division for the second consecutive season. In honor of Harry Gauss' continual contributions to the league's growth and development since the creation of London City the CSL administration paid tribute by creating the Harry Paul Gauss Award to individuals who have shown allegiance, commitment and support to the league and its member clubs. The Ontario Soccer Association awarded Harry with the Individual Meritorious Service Award for providing special services to the sport for over 20 years.

After a successful surgery Harry returned to the fold in 2008, but only in the capacity of director-at-large with former player Eddie Edgar appointed as head coach. After a series of poor performances Edgar was released from his position with Sean Gauss replacing him on an interim basis. Though Sean managed to record two draws the season was still a disaster as London finished the season without a single win becoming the first team to go win less since North York Talons in the 1997 CNSL season. In 2009, London renewed their contract with Rogers TV in order to continue broadcasting their home matches.

Sean Gauss returned for the 2009 season with Andrew Loague serving as club captain. While Harry Gauss would serve as a consultant to general manager Ryan Gauss. Notable acquisitions were Dominican internationals Chad Bertrand, Rasheed Bertrand, and the return of Euclid Bertrand. Shortly into the season Sean Gauss resigned and Loague was elevated to the position. Though Loague managed to improve the club's record they still finished at the bottom of the standings. At the conclusion of the season the Gauss family decided to put the club up for sale. One month later on October 31, 2009, Harry Gauss died from cancer.

=== End of Gauss era (2010–11) ===
After Harry's death the family decided to run the club for another season and dedicated the 2010 season in his memory. Loague assembled a roster with a mixture of veterans and imports. The notable players signed were Genti Dervishi, Jeff Brown, Genti Buzali, Kevin Zimmerman, Thomas Beattie, Winston Griffiths, Fabijan Knežević, and Elvir Gigolaj. After two months into the season Loague resigned with Luka Shaqiri being named his successor. Shaqiri vastly improved London's position and for the first time in four seasons the club didn't finish at the bottom of the table. At the awards ceremony Thomas Beattie received the Rookie of the Year award.

For the 2011 season London entered a reserve team in the CSL Second Division. In the regular season Shaqiri achieved a slightly better team result then in the previous season, but still failed to clinch a postseason berth. One notable achievement went to Jeremy Caranci, where the league awarded him the Second Division Rookie of the Year award. The conclusion of the season also marked the end of the Gauss era as the family sold the franchise to Andrew Crowe a Hamilton businessman involved in the recycling business. For 38 years the Gauss family had provided professional soccer to city and developed several players like Tyler Hemming, Josh Wagenaar, David Edgar, Ryan Thomson, Cameron Medwin, Niels Dekker, Paul Munster, Elvir Gigolaj, Haidar Al-Shaïbani, Paul Victor, Semir Mesanovic, and Tom Beattie.

=== New ownership (2012–2018) ===
The new ownership brought in significant changes by hiring Manuel Hernandez as the new general manager and Stanislav Zvezdic as the head coach. Due to time constraints because of change of ownership the reserve squad was withdrawn from the Second Division. Zvazdic brought in several imports with CSL experience mainly from the Balkan countries. The imports included Nenad Begović, Vladimir Markotić, Ranko Golijanin, Rade Novković, Nenad Nikolić, Dalibor Mitrović, Boban Stojanović, Nikola Stanojević, Zvonko Bakula, and William Etchu Tabi. Early into the season Zvezdic unexpectedly resigned from his position after visiting Serbia for personal reasons. His temporary replacement was team captain Begovic with Mike Marcoccia assisting him. Begovic took the team from the bottom of the standings and transformed them into a playoff contender. Despite the change in performance London still missed the final playoff berth by five points. The league awarded Ryan Gauss with the Harry Paul Gauss award.

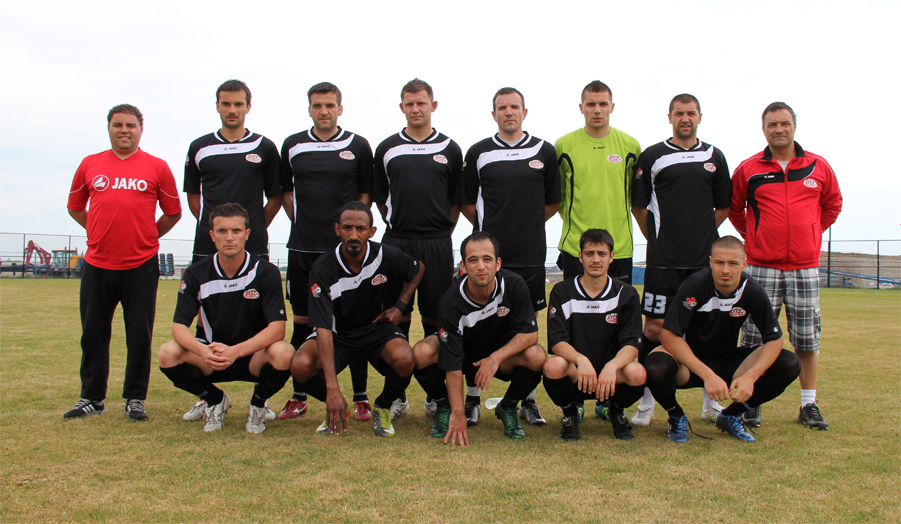
2012 squad under the new ownership.

In 2013 Jasmin Halkic was hired as general manager and was given coaching duties. London's reserve team returned to the Second Division, and transferred their home venue to the Hellenic Community Centre due to scheduling conflicts with Cove Road. Notable acquisitions for the season were Branislav Vukomanović, Haris Fazlagić, Tonci Pirija, and Marin Vučemilović-Grgić. After a mediocre start to the season Halkic transferred his coaching responsibilities to Tomo Dancetovic. Dancetovic made history as London clinched a postseason berth, thus ending City's 12 year playoff drought. Their reserve team also made history by qualifying for the playoffs for the first time by finishing third in the standings. In the first round of the postseason London faced the York Region Shooters, where they advanced to the next round by winning 4–2 in a penalty shootout. The next round they faced Kingston FC, but were eliminated from the competition by a score of 4–2. For his efforts Yonan Samara was recognized as the Second Division MVP by the league.

The 2014 season was a disappointment as London fell short by one point to a playoff berth. One notable achievement went to Marin Vučemilović-Grgić as he won his second MVP award. The following season Andrew Crowe sold his share to partner Zoran Kliseric as the new ownership were preparing a move to Hamilton. Other changes included the removal of their reserve team in the Second Division. Under head coach Josip Dzale the team secured the final playoff berth. In the preliminary round of the postseason City faced the Serbian White Eagles, but suffered an early departure after a 1–0 loss. In 2016, team owner Kliseric relocated to Hamilton, but gave the London territory to Jasmin Halkic. Halkic relegated London to the Second Division in order to serve as a reserve team for Milton SC. During the 2016 season London clinched a postseason berth by finishing fifth in the standings. In the first round of the postseason London faced York Region Shooters B where they lost 1–0.

=== CASL (2019–present) ===
In 2019, London along with Comet FC, Galaxy SC, Halton United, Milton SC, and Star FC became charter members of the Canadian Academy of Soccer League (CASL).

== Roster ==
As of October 31, 2019

Note: Flags indicate national team as defined under FIFA eligibility rules; some limited exceptions apply. Players may hold more than one non-FIFA nationality.

No.	Pos.	Nation	Player
—			Kadri Adam
—			Kenan Ajkic
—			Brendon Barbosa
—			Munera Brandon
—			Dennis Domean
—			Sauve Doug
—			Birinduwa Elivis
—			Barinah Enock
—			Yas Jr Halkic

No.	Pos.	Nation	Player
—	FW	SRB	Nikola Janicijevic
—	DF	SRB	Stanoje Jovanovic
—			Theodoros Mihalopulos
—			Nedic Misa
—			Marko Mitrusic
—			Orunesajo Oluwasoore
—			Cristian Salamanka
—	DF	BIH	Milos Urta

== Stadiums ==
- Cove Road Stadium, London, Ontario (1973–2014)
- Hellenic Centre Stadium, London, Ontario (2014-2017)
- Milton Community Sports Park (2019-)

== Head coaches ==
- Graham Sawyer (1976)
- Ron Clayton (1977)
- Harry Gauss (1990–1996)
- Steve Roney (1997)
- Harry Gauss (1998)
- Tony Laferrara (1999)
- Harry Gauss (2000)
- Jurek Gebczynski (2001–2002)
- Harry Gauss (2003–2006)
- Sean Gauss (2007)
- Eddie Edgar (2008)
- Sean Gauss (2008–2009)
- Andrew Loague (2009–2010)
- Luka Shaqiri (2010–2011)
- Stanislav Zvezdić (2012)
- Nenad Begović (2012)
- Tomo Dancetović (2013–2014)
- Josip Džale (2015)
- Jasmin Halkić (2016–2017)
- Ivan Jevtic (2019–2024)

== Honours ==
- Open Canada Cup: 2003
- Canadian Academy of Soccer League: 2021

== Notable players ==
Canada

- Jeremy Caranci (2011)
- Niels Dekker (1999)
- Jamie Dodds (2012)
- David Edgar (2001)
- Elvir Gigolaj (2011)
- Tyler Hemming (2001–2002)
- Fabijan Knežević (2011)
- Cameron Medwin (1999–2001)
- Semir Mesanovic (1999)
- Frank Sauer (1975)
- Haidar Al-Shaïbani (2002–2005)
- Josh Wagenaar (2002)

Albania

- Isa Bulku (1999)
- Gentian Buzali (2001–2003, 2010)
- Tony Preci (1996)
- Ervin Ryta (2003)
- Eris Tafaj (2003–2005, 2006, 2011)

Dominica

- Chad Bertrand (2009)
- Euclid Bertrand (1995–1999, 2009)
- Rasheed Bertrand (2009)
- Anthony Dominique (1998)
- Kenrick Emanuel (1995–1999)
- Paul Victor (2000)

England

- Thomas Beattie (2010–2011)
- Eddie Edgar (1980)
- Ray Flannigan (1974, 1976–1979)
- John Hold (1975)

Germany

- Gert Dörfel (1976–1977)

Northern Ireland

- Paul Munster (2004)

Poland

- Jurek Gebczynski (1988–2000)

Romania

- Christian Dragoi (2015)

Serbia

- Nenad Begović (2012–2014)
- Zoran Belošević (2015)
- Ranko Golijanin (2012)
- Vladimir Jašić (2015)
- Igor Krmar (2015)
- Dalibor Mitrović (2012)
- Nenad Nikolić (2012)
- Rade Novković (2012–2015)
- Boban Stojanović (2012–2013)
- Branislav Vukomanović (2013–2014)

== Year-by-year ==
The Year	Division	League	Regular season	Playoffs
1973	1 - Senior Division	NSL	Seventh	
1974	1	NSL	Eighth	
1975	1 - First Division	NSL	Eighth	
1976	1 - First Division	NSL	Sixth	
1977	1 - First Division	NSL	Sixth	
1978	1 - First Division	NSL	Tenth	
1979	1	NSL	Ninth	
1980	1 - Senior Division	NSL	Fifth	
1981	1	NSL	Seventh	
1982	1	NSL	Fifth	
1995	1	CNSL	Fourth	did not qualify
1996	1	CNSL	Fifth	did not qualify
1997	1	CNSL	Fifth	Quarter-finals
1998	1	CPSL	Sixth	did not qualify
1999	1	CPSL	Fourth	Semi-finals
2000	1	CPSL	Eighth	Wild Card Round
2001	1	CPSL	Twelfth	did not qualify
2002	1 - Western Conference	CPSL	Seventh	did not qualify
2003	1 - Western Conference	CPSL	Seventh	did not qualify
2004	1 - Western Conference	CPSL	Fifth	did not qualify
2005	1 - Western Conference	CPSL	Fifth	did not qualify
2006	1 - National Division	CSL	Seventh	did not qualify
2007	1 - National Division	CSL	Seventh	did not qualify
2008	1 - National Division	CSL	Seventh	did not qualify
2009	1 - National Division	CSL	Sixth	did not qualify
2010	1	CSL	Eleventh	did not qualify
2011	1	CSL	Eleventh	did not qualify
2012	1	CSL	Twelfth	did not qualify
2013	1	CSL	Seventh	Semi-finals
2014	1	CSL	Ninth	did not qualify
2015	1	CSL	Eighth	Quarter-finals
2016	2	CSL	Fifth	Quarter-finals
2017	2	CSL	Eighth	did not qualify
2019	1	CASL	Fourth	'
2021	1	CASL	First	'
