= Ryan Thomson (footballer, born 1982) =

Scottish footballer

Personal information
- Date of birth: 16 September 1982 (age 44)
- Place of birth: Greenock, Scotland
- Position: Midfielder

Youth career
- Greenock Morton
- Celtic

Senior career*
Years	Team	Apps	(Gls)
2000	London City	7	(2)
2003–2004	HNK Hajduk Split	0	(0)
2005	Rot-Weiss Essen	1	(0)
2005	Minnesota Thunder	0	(0)
2006	Tennis Borussia Berlin	17	(1)
2007–?	Connecticut Huskies		
- * Club domestic league appearances and goals

Ryan Thomson (born 16 September 1982 in Greenock) is a former professional Scottish footballer.

Thomson began his career in 2000 in the Canadian Professional Soccer League with London City. Midway through the season he received a tryout and secured a contract with Greenock Morton F.C. in the Scottish First Division.

While at HNK Hajduk Split, Thomson failed to make an appearance in the Prva HNL, the top tier of Croatian football, but did however play several matches in the Croatian Cup and in European matches.

Thomson made one appearance for Rot-Weiss Essen in the 2. Bundesliga during the 2004–05 season, as a substitute for Daniel Teixeira in a 0–0 draw with Rot-Weiß Erfurt.
