= Stanoje Jovanović =

Serbian footballer (born 1993)

Personal information
- Date of birth: 21 August 1993 (age 33)
- Place of birth: Loznica, FR Yugoslavia
- Position: Midfielder

Senior career*
Years	Team	Apps	(Gls)
2012–2013	Hajduk Kula	0	(0)
2014–2015	Zvijezda Gradačac	23	(0)
2015–2017	Bežanija	36	(2)
2017	Metalleghe-BSI	13	(1)
2017–2018	Orašje	27	(2)
2018–2019	TOŠK Tešanj	11	(0)
2019–2021	London City		
- * Club domestic league appearances and goals

Stanoje Jovanović (born 21 August 1993) is a Serbian footballer who plays as a midfielder for London City.

== Club career ==
=== Early career ===
Jovanović signed a contract with the Serbian SuperLiga side Hajduk Kula in 2012. In 2014, he played in the Premier League of Bosnia and Herzegovina with Zvijezda Gradačac. Throughout his time with Zvijezda, he made his debut in the 2014–15 Bosnia and Herzegovina Football Cup, where the club was eliminated in the quarter-finals by Olimpik. After a season in Bosnia, he returned to Serbia to play in the Serbian First League with Bežanija.

=== Bosnia ===
In the 2017 winter transfer market, he returned to the Bosnian top tier to sign with Metalleghe-BSI. He recorded his first goal for the club on March 18, 2017, against Zrinjski Mostar. After a season with Metalleghe, he signed with Orašje in the First League of the Federation of Bosnia and Herzegovina. Midway through the season, he was linked with a possible move to Sloboda Tuzla. Instead, he secured a contract with TOŠK Tešanj. His stint with Tešanj was short-lived as he left the club midway through the season.

=== Canada ===
In 2019, Jovanović played abroad in the Canadian Academy of Soccer League with London City. In his second season with London, he assisted in securing the league title and finishing as the league's top goal scorer.

== Honours ==
London City

- Canadian AOF Soccer League: 2021
