= Ervin Ryta =

Albanian footballer

Personal information
- Full name: Ervin Ryta
- Date of birth: July 9, 1978 (age 48)
- Place of birth: Albania
- Position: Defender

Senior career*
Years	Team	Apps	(Gls)
1995	London Croatia		
1997	Minnesota Thunder	10	(1)
1998	London Croatia		
1999	Toronto Lynx	4	(0)
2000	Toronto Croatia	7	(0)
2001	Toronto Lynx	8	(0)
2003	London City SC		
- * Club domestic league appearances and goals

Ervin Ryta (born August 9, 1978) is an Albanian former footballer who played in the Western Ontario Soccer League, USL A-League, and the Canadian Professional Soccer League.

== Club career ==
Ryta arrived to Canada in 1995 after participating in an Albanian youth tournament hosted in Canada. He remained in Canada to play with London Croatia in the Western Ontario Soccer League. In 1997, he went south of the border to sign with Minnesota Thunder in the USL A-League. The following season, he returned to London Croatia for another season. Within a year he was back in the A-League with the Toronto Lynx, and made his debut on May 15, 1999, against the Rochester Raging Rhinos.

In 2000, he signed with Toronto Croatia of the Canadian Professional Soccer League. He made his debut on July 9, 2000, against the North York Astros. He featured in the CPSL Championship final against Toronto Olympians, where Croatia won the title by a score of 2–1. He returned to Toronto Lynx for the 2001 season, where he appeared in 8 matches. In 2003, he returned to the CPSL for another stint with London City.
