= Fabijan =

Fabijan is a Slavic masculine given name and a surname, cognate to Fabian. Notable people with the name include:

== First name ==
- Fabijan Abrantovich (1884–1946), Religious and civic leader
- Fabijan Buntić (born 1997), professional footballer
- Fabijan Cipot (born 1976), retired Slovenian football defender
- Fabijan Knežević (born 1987), Canadian-Croatian footballer
- Fabijan Komljenović (born 1968), Croatian footballer
- Fabijan Krivak (born 2005), Croatian footballer
- Fabijan Krslovic (born 1995), Australian professional basketball player
- Fabijan Šantyr (1887–1920), Belarusian poet and writer
- Fabijan Šovagović (1932–2001), Croatian film television, theatre actor, and writer
- Fabijan Svalina (born 1971), Roman Catholic prelate

== Surname ==
- Ivo Fabijan (1950–2006), Croatian musician, singer and composer
