= Ronnie Clayton (footballer, born 1937) =

English footballer

Personal information
- Full name: Ronald Clayton
- Date of birth: 18 January 1937 (age 89)
- Place of birth: Hull, England
- Height: 5 ft 9 in (1.75 m)
- Position: Inside right

Senior career*
Years	Team	Apps	(Gls)
19??–1958	Hereford United	0	(0)
1958	Arsenal	0	(0)
1958–1960	Brighton & Hove Albion	14	(3)
1960–196?	Hastings United		
- Rugby Town
- Hinckley Athletic
- Hereford United
1965–1966	Toronto Inter-Roma		
1968	Toronto Ukraina		

Managerial career
- 1977: London City
- * Club domestic league appearances and goals

Ronald Clayton (born 18 January 1937) is an English former professional footballer who played as an inside right in the Football League for Brighton & Hove Albion. He was on the books of Arsenal without playing for their first team, and also played non-league football for Hereford United, Hastings United, Rugby Town and Hinckley Athletic. In 1965, he played abroad in the Eastern Canada Professional Soccer League with Toronto Inter-Roma. In 1969, he played in the National Soccer League with Toronto Ukraina.

In 1977, he was the head coach for London City in the National Soccer League.
