= Gentian Buzali =

Albanian former footballer

Personal information
- Full name: Gentian Buzali
- Date of birth: August 20, 1978 (age 48)
- Place of birth: Albania
- Position: Forward

Senior career*
Years	Team	Apps	(Gls)
1997	Toronto Croatia		
1998–1999	Toronto Lynx	10	(0)
2000	Toronto Croatia		
2001–2003	London City SC		
2006–2007	London White Eagles		
2009	London Croatia		
2010	London City SC		
- * Club domestic league appearances and goals

Gentian Buzali (born August 20, 1978) is an Albanian former footballer who played in the Canadian National Soccer League, USL A-League, Canadian Professional Soccer League, and the Western Ontario Soccer League.

== Playing career ==
Buzali immigrated to Canada and played with Toronto Croatia in the Canadian National Soccer League. The following season, he signed with the Toronto Lynx of the USL A-League. He made his debut on August 26, 1998, against the Long Island Rough Riders coming on as a substitute for David Diplacido. In the 1999 season he appeared in 9 matches. In 2000, he returned to Toronto Croatia to play in the Canadian Professional Soccer League, and made his return on May 31, 2000, against Glen Shields Sun Devils. During the season he assisted in claiming the CPSL Championship in a 2–1 victory over Toronto Olympians. In 2001, he signed with London City and made his debut on May 25, 2001, against Toronto Supra, where he managed to record a goal. He played with London for three seasons, and received a trial in 2002 with Oliveira do Bairro S.C.

In 2006, he played with London White Eagles in the Western Ontario Soccer League, where he was the top goalscorer for two straight seasons in the Premier Division. In 2009, he played with division rivals London Croatia and in 2010 he returned to London City to play in the Canadian Soccer League.
