= Euclid Bertrand =

Dominican association football player

Personal information
- Date of birth: July 23, 1974 (age 52)
- Place of birth: Roseau, Dominica
- Position: Midfielder

Senior career*
Years	Team	Apps	(Gls)
1995–1999	London City SC		
1999–2003	Northern Bombers FC		
2009	London City SC		
2016–	Dublanc FC		

International career
1998–2021	Dominica	25	(0)
- * Club domestic league appearances and goals

Euclid Bertrand (born July 23, 1974) is a Dominican footballer who plays as a midfielder with Dublanc FC in the Dominica Premier League.

== Club career ==
Bertrand played in 1995 with London City in the Canadian National Soccer League. In 1999, he returned to his homeland to play with Northern Bombers FC in the Dominica Premier League. He returned to London City for the 2009 season. In 2016, he signed with Dublanc FC in the Dominica Premier League.

== International career ==
Bertrand has played for the Dominica national team since 2008.
