= Josh Wagenaar =

Canadian retired soccer player (born 1985)

Personal information
- Full name: Joshua Frederick Wagenaar
- Date of birth: February 26, 1985 (age 41)
- Place of birth: Grimsby, Ontario, Canada
- Height: 6 ft 1 in (1.85 m)
- Position: Goalkeeper

Youth career
- St. Catharines Wolves
- –2002: Hamilton Sparta

College career
Years	Team	Apps	(Gls)
2003–2005	Hartwick Hawks	47	(0)

Senior career*
Years	Team	Apps	(Gls)
2002	London City		
2006–2007	Den Haag	5	(0)
2008	Lyngby	2	(0)
2008–2009	Yeovil Town	23	(0)
2009–2010	Falkirk	0	(0)
Total		30	(0)

International career
2002	Canada U-17	3	(0)
2003–2005	Canada U-20	18	(0)
2008	Canada U-23	4	(0)
2006–2010	Canada	4	(0)
- * Club domestic league appearances and goals

Joshua Frederick Wagenaar (born February 26, 1985, in Grimsby, Ontario) is a Canadian retired soccer player, who is currently an assistant coach at Louisiana Tech.

== Club career ==
Wagenaar attended Hartwick College in Oneonta, New York state. He only played 12 games for them in his final season because of a foot injury. In 2002, he played with London City in the Canadian Professional Soccer League.

=== Netherlands and Denmark ===
Wagenaar began his career in the Netherlands as #2 behind the infamous Stefan Postma. He played his first professional game against PSV when he came in after Postma broke his leg in a collision. Wagenaar started the next game against AZ Alkmaar in which ADO Den Haag drew 2-2 earning Den Haags first point of the season. During the game Wagenaar suffered a torn muscle in his rib cage and was unable to start the next game. The season ended with Wagenaar only playing a couple more games and ADO Den Haag being relegated. Halfway through his second year he left Den Haag and went to the States to focus on Olympic Qualifying with the Canadian U-23 team. Canada lost out for the final place at the Beijing olympics to a quality US team that included Sacha Kljestan, Freddy Adu, Johnathan Spector, and Jozy Altidore. After the olympic qualifying Wagenaar latched onto an already relegated Lyngby BK of the Danish Superliga for the final two months of their season.

=== Yeovil Town ===
In July 2008 he joined English League One side Leeds United on a trial, but was not offered a contract. On 6 August 2008, after a successful trial, he officially signed for League One side Yeovil Town to answer the club's urgent need for a goalkeeper.

For the first three months of the season he was second choice behind "one-time" Canadian goalkeeper Asmir Begović, but after Begović's loan ended, Wagenaar played every game, and made the League One Team of the Week after a match against Southend United.

He passed a medical for Falkirk and signed a one-year deal. He was released at the end of the season after Falkirk were relegated. He then went on trial at Seattle Sounders FC.

== International career ==
In the summer of 2005, Wagenaar played for the Canada national U-20 team at the World Youth Cup in the Netherlands.

He made his senior international debut in a friendly against Hungary on November 15, 2006. He played his second game against Guatemala, playing 45 minutes he kept a clean sheet on June 30, 2009. Wagenaar was also chosen in the 23-man roster for the 2009 CONCACAF Gold Cup, Canada won Group A with 7 points before being knocked out by Honduras in the Quarter Finals. Wagenaar played his third game for Canada in a 3–0 loss to Macedonia on November 14, 2009, playing the full 90 minutes. Wagenaar played his fourth game for Canada in a 1–1 draw against Venezuela.
