= Frank Sauer =

Canadian soccer player

Personal information
- Date of birth: 21 March 1954 (age 72)
- Position: Defender

Senior career*
Years	Team	Apps	(Gls)
1975	London City		
1976	New York Cosmos	0	(0)

International career
1974	Canada	4	(0)
- * Club domestic league appearances and goals

Frank Sauer (born 21 March 1954) is a Canadian retired international soccer player who played as a defender.

== Club career ==
He played at club level for the New York Cosmos. Before he went to New York he played with London City in the National Soccer League.

== International career ==
Sauer made his debut for Canada in an October 1973 friendly match against Luxembourg and earned a total of four caps, scoring no goals. His final international was an April 1974 friendly against Bermuda.
