= Kenrick Emanuel =

Dominican former player and manager

Personal information
- Full name: Kenrick Emanuel
- Date of birth: November 21, 1968 (age 57)
- Place of birth: Roseau, Dominica
- Position: Forward

Senior career*
Years	Team	Apps	(Gls)
1995–1999	London City SC		

International career
1988–2000	Dominica		

Managerial career
- 2000: Dominica
- * Club domestic league appearances and goals

Kenrick Emanuel (born November 21, 1968) is a Dominican former player and manager.

== Football career ==
Emanuel played in the Canadian National Soccer League with London City from 1995 till 1999. He played with the Dominica national football team from 1988 till 2000. He was the Dominican team captain from 1994 till 2000. After his retirement in 2000 he managed the Dominica national team.
