= John Hold =

English footballer

Personal information
- Full name: John David Hold
- Date of birth: 28 March 1948
- Place of birth: Southampton, England
- Position: Forward

Senior career*
Years	Team	Apps	(Gls)
1965–1971	Bournemouth & Boscombe Athletic	85	(25)
1968–1969	→ Crewe Alexandra (loan)	2	(0)
1971–1973	Northampton Town	44	(11)
1973–1974	Margate	?	(11)
1974–1975	Ashford Town		
1975–1979	London City		
- * Club domestic league appearances and goals

John David Hold (born 28 March 1948) is an English former footballer who played as a forward.

He began his career with Fareham Town before playing professionally for Bournemouth & Boscombe Athletic, Crewe Alexandra (on loan) and Northampton Town between 1965 and 1973, making a total of 131 Football League appearances.

His career continued playing non-league football at Margate and Ashford Town.

In 1975, Hold moved to Canada and played for London City. He played for four years before retiring in 1979.
