= Anthony Dominique =

Association football player

Personal information
- Date of birth: 30 November 1969 (age 56)
- Place of birth: Dominica
- Position: Forward

Senior career*
Years	Team	Apps	(Gls)
1995	North York Talons		
1996–1997	Saint Joseph F.C.		
1998	London City SC		

International career
1995–1998	Dominica	4	(1)
- * Club domestic league appearances and goals

Anthony Dominique (born 30 November 1969) Dominican former footballer who played in the Dominica Premier League and the Canadian National Soccer League.

== Club career ==
Dominique played in 1996 with the North York Talons in the Canadian National Soccer League. During the season he was selected for the CNSL All-Star team in match against Toronto Italia, which featured Diego Maradona. After the conclusion of season he returned to Dominica to play with Saint Joseph F.C. in the Dominica Premier League. He returned to Canada in 1998 to play with London City in the Canadian Professional Soccer League, and made his debut on 10 June 1998 against Toronto Croatia.

== International career ==
Dominique played with the Dominica national team, where he appeared in four matches and scored one goal. He participated in the 1998 FIFA World Cup qualification, where he played against Antigua and Barbuda, and Barbados.
