= Haidar Al-Shaïbani =

Canadian soccer player and coach (born 1984)

Personal information
- Date of birth: March 31, 1984 (age 42)
- Place of birth: Sétif, Algeria
- Height: 1.83 m (6 ft 0 in)
- Position: Goalkeeper

Team information
- Current team: Saint-Étienne (video analyst & goalkeeper coach)

College career
| Years | Team | Apps | (Gls) |
| 2004–2007 | Western | | |

Senior career*
| Years | Team | Apps | (Gls) |
| 2002–2005 | London City | 40 | (0) |
| 2006–2007 | North York Astros | 25 | (0) |
| 2009–2013 | Nîmes | 25 | (0) |
| 2012–2013 | Nîmes II | 4 | (0) |
| 2013–2017 | Le Puy | 73 | (0) |
| Total | | 167 | (0) |

International career
| 2007–2009 | Canada Universiade | 12 | (0) |
| 2010 | Canada | 1 | (0) |

Managerial career
- 2015–2017: Le Puy (staff)
- 2017–: Saint-Étienne (video analyst)
- 2017–: Saint-Étienne (goalkeeper coach)
- * Club domestic league appearances and goals

Haidar Al-Shaïbani (born March 31, 1984) is a soccer coach and former player who works as a video analyst and goalkeeper coach at Saint-Étienne. Born in Algeria, he represented Canada at international level

== Career ==
Haidar Al-Shaïbani was born on March 31, 1984, in Setif, Algeria.

=== University ===
Al-Shaibani played University soccer at the University of Western Ontario from 2004 to 2007, where he was named Ontario University Athletics first team All Star in four consecutive years (2004 to 2007). In 2007, Al-Shaibani was named the OUA MVP and a Canadian Inter-university Sport first-team All-Canadian.

In his four years with the Mustangs, he led them to three OUA championships and two bronze medals at CIS National Championships.

=== Professional ===
He began his professional career in 2002 with London City in the Canadian Professional Soccer League. He featured in the 2003 Open Canada Cup final against Metro Lions, they won the title 4–2 in a penalty shootout. In 2005, he received the CPSL Goalkeeper of the Year award. In 2006, he signed with division rivals North York Astros. During his tenure with North York, he helped clinch a postseason berth in 2007. In 2009, he went abroad to France to sign with Nîmes Olympique in Ligue 2. Al-Shaïbani made his debut for Nîmes on August 25, 2009, in a Coupe de la Ligue match against Troyes. He has also featured for the club in the Coupe de France.

== International career ==
Haidar represented Canada at two Summer Universiade, Bangkok 2007 and Belgrade 2009. He helped Canada to its best performance in history at the Universiade in men's soccer with a fourth-place finish at the 2007 Games in Bangkok, Thailand.

He earned his first call-up for Canada on 14 May 2010 for the friendly matches against Argentina and Venezuela on 29 May 2010. He earned his first cap for Canada as a substitute in the second half against Venezuela, where he helped the team to a 1–1 tie.

On September 4, 2010, Coach Stephen Hart selected Al-Shaïbani for the Friendly games in Toronto and Montreal, against Peru on September 4, 2010, and Honduras on September 7, 2010.

== Managerial career ==
In 2017, he was named the video analyst and goalkeeper coach for AS Saint-Étienne in Ligue 1.

== Personal life ==
Al-Shaïbani was born in Sétif, Algeria, to an Iraqi father and a Ukrainian mother. His family moved to Canada in 1998.
