= Eddie Edgar =

English footballer

Personal information
- Full name: Edward Edgar
- Date of birth: 31 October 1956 (age 69)
- Place of birth: Jarrow, England
- Position: Goalkeeper

Youth career
- –1974: Newcastle United

Senior career*
Years	Team	Apps	(Gls)
1974–1976	Newcastle United	1	(0)
1976–1979	Hartlepool United	75	(0)
1980	London City		

Managerial career
- 2008: London City
- * Club domestic league appearances and goals

Eddie Edgar (born 31 October 1956) is an English former professional football goalkeeper who played in the Football League First Division, Football League Fourth Division, and the National Soccer League.

== Career ==
Edgar was born in Jarrow and played professionally for Newcastle United, although he made only one appearance for the club in a 4-2 FA Cup quarter-final defeat to Derby County in 1976. In 1976, he signed with Hartlepool United in the Football League Fourth Division. He was loaned to the New York Cosmos of the North America Soccer League to serve as a backup for Shep Messing. In 1980, he went to Canada to play with London City in the National Soccer League.

== Managerial career ==
Edgar coached the University of Waterloo in Waterloo, Ontario and laid the seeds for a program that would eventually reach its first national championship tournament (a year after Edgar left the team). Edgar was appointed as the manager of London City of the Canadian Soccer League to replace cancer fighting Harry Gauss, but was dismissed on 6 June 2008 after a string of poor performances.

== Personal life ==
His son David is also a professional footballer who plays as a central defender.
