= David Edgar (soccer, born 1987) =

Canadian professional soccer player

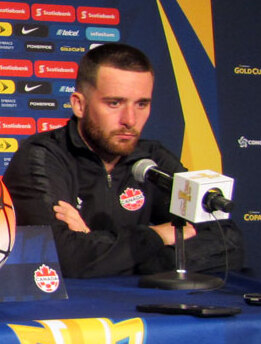
- Edgar in 2015

Personal information
- Full name: David Edward Edgar
- Date of birth: May 19, 1987 (age 39)
- Place of birth: Kitchener, Ontario, Canada
- Height: 1.93 m (6 ft 4 in)
- Position: Centre-back

Youth career
- Kitchener SC
- London City
- 2001–2005: Newcastle United

Senior career*
Years	Team	Apps	(Gls)
2001	London City		
2005–2009	Newcastle United	19	(2)
2009–2014	Burnley	99	(4)
2010	→ Swansea City (loan)	5	(1)
2014–2016	Birmingham City	16	(1)
2015	→ Huddersfield Town (loan)	12	(0)
2015–2016	→ Sheffield United (loan)	36	(2)
2016–2017	Vancouver Whitecaps FC	8	(0)
2016	→ Whitecaps FC 2 (loan)	1	(0)
2018	Nashville SC	5	(0)
2018	Ottawa Fury	7	(0)
2019	Hartlepool United	9	(0)
2019–2020	Forge FC	18	(1)
Total		235	(11)

International career
2003	Canada U17	2	(0)
2003–2008	Canada U20	24	(2)
2011–2018	Canada	42	(4)

Managerial career
- 2021–2025: Forge FC (assistant)
- * Club domestic league appearances and goals

David Edward Edgar (born May 19, 1987) is a Canadian soccer coach and former professional player.

As a player he was a centre-back who began his professional career in England with Premier League side Newcastle United, before also going on to feature in the top flight for Burnley. He went on to feature in the Football League for Swansea City, Birmingham City, Sheffield United later having a stint with non-league Hartlepool United. He also played in Major League Soccer with Vancouver Whitecaps FC before finishing his career with spells at Nashville SC, Ottawa Fury and Forge FC.

Edgar represented Canada at various levels having made his debut for the Canadian senior team on February 9, 2011, and was a member of the Canadian U-20 team at the 2007 FIFA U-20 World Cup.

== Club career ==
=== Early career ===
Edgar grew up in Kitchener and began playing soccer at age three with Kitchener SC. He attended Saint Kateri Catholic Elementary School, where he broke many athletic records including the 800 m, 1500m and long jump and won athlete of the year in grade eight. A sports-obsessed child, Edgar tried his hand at ice hockey, long and middle distance running as well as soccer. When Edgar was nine, his father Eddie took him to England to compete in a soccer tournament, which was sponsored by Manchester United. Edgar impressed at the tournament, to the extent he was offered a scholarship deal by Manchester United. However, he turned down the opportunity, opting to stay in Canada for the time being. He also excelled at hockey and was even considered to have had the potential to be drafted into the NHL.

From the age of 11 he began playing soccer at the provincial level for Ontario, along with his future international teammate Jaime Peters. He continued to switch between playing hockey and soccer, however at 13 years of age he decided to quit hockey and focus primarily on playing soccer. To improve his level of play his father had arranged for him to sign with London City of the Canadian Professional Soccer League.

=== Newcastle United ===
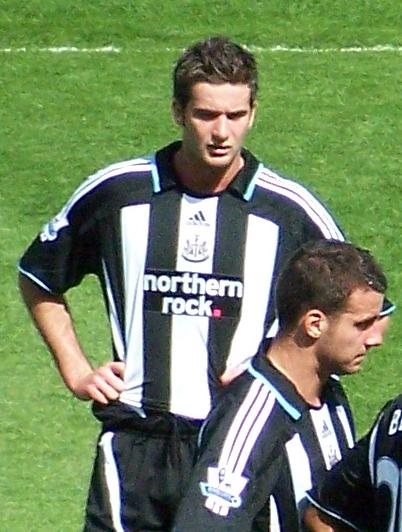
Edgar playing for Newcastle United in 2008

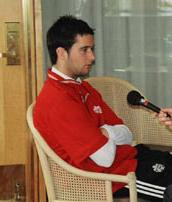
Edgar in 2007

After impressing in trials for numerous soccer clubs including Celtic, he was offered a scholarship at the Newcastle United academy, which he accepted. Aged 14, he left Canada and moved into his grandmother's home in Hebburn, Tyne and Wear.

Edgar began playing regularly in the academy and made his debut for the reserve team on April 10, 2003, against Bradford City. Edgar caught the eye of Spanish club Málaga CF in September 2005 when Newcastle played the La Liga club in a pre-season friendly game. Málaga, as well as a few English clubs, declared an interest in signing him. However, Newcastle chairman Freddy Shepherd was quick to announce that Edgar was not for sale, and that he had been given a new contract by the club to ward off any further interest. Edgar began making more regular appearances in the reserve team during the 2005–06 season. On May 19, 2006, while celebrating his nineteenth birthday, he played and scored in the Canadian Under-20 side's 2–1 victory over the Brazilian Under-20 side. This was the first victory Canada have ever had over Brazil in any level of men's soccer.

Edgar continued to appear for Newcastle's reserves and he was called up to the first team squad due to a lengthy injury list midway through the 2006–07 FA Premier League season. He made his first team debut for Newcastle against Bolton Wanderers on December 26, 2006. On January 1, 2007, during his home debut, he scored his first goal for the club with a long range strike against Manchester United in a 2–2 draw. Edgar was playing in the unfamiliar position of full back as part of a makeshift Newcastle defence consisting of three under-21 players and a winger, due to injuries to first team defenders. Edgar was later named man of the match and drew praise from Newcastle manager Glenn Roeder for his performance during the game, having marked Cristiano Ronaldo effectively.

During the 2007–08 season, Edgar voiced his concern at his lack of first team soccer at Newcastle, where he had yet to make any senior appearances despite being the reserve team captain. Towards the end of the season he was given a run of games in the first team and was praised by manager Kevin Keegan for his performance against Reading. On May 5, 2007, he signed a contract with Newcastle that kept him at the club until 2009. In April 2008 Edgar stated his belief that he needed to bulk up to compete in the Premier League, after facing players like Dean Ashton. On December 28, 2008, Edgar scored his second goal for the club in a 5–1 loss against Liverpool. On May 24, 2009, he was sent off in the last minute of the final game of the season against Aston Villa, a game that Newcastle lost 1–0, thus confirming their relegation from the Premier League. After a season in which Newcastle failed to win a single match that Edgar featured in – 11 losses and 2 draws in his 13 games – Edgar rejected a contract offered by Newcastle and consequently left the club.

=== Burnley ===
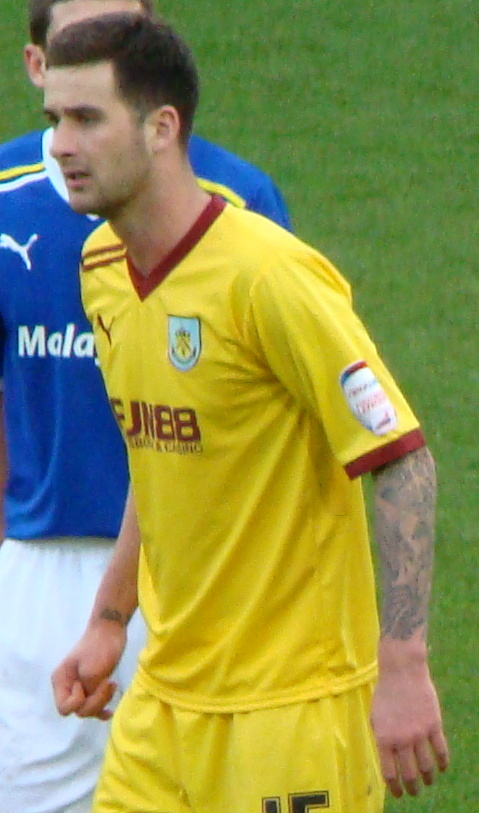
Edgar playing for Burnley in 2012

On July 1, 2009, it was announced that Edgar had joined Burnley on a four-year deal. On December 24, Burnley and Newcastle announced they had agreed to a transfer fee of £300,000 for Edgar, avoiding a tribunal hearing to settle the matter.

Edgar made his debut for Burnley in the second round of the League Cup against Hartlepool United on August 25, however he found himself out of favour under the manager at the time, Owen Coyle, with this appearance being his only one, and was never included in one of his Premier League squads. After Coyle's controversial departure in January 2010, Edgar was included in the starting line-up for Brian Laws' first match in charge, against Manchester United, which saw Burnley lose 3–0 on January 16, 2010. At the end of the 2009–10 season, Edgar went on to make four appearances.

Following his loan spell at Swansea City came to an end, Edgar was expected to be included in the first team by Laws ahead of the 2010–11 season. He then made his first appearance of the season against Ipswich Town on August 14, 2010, but was sent–off after a second bookable offence in the 79th minute, in a 1–1 draw. However, throughout the 2010–11 season saw Edgar struggled in the first team and his own injury concerns and was restricted to eight appearances in all competitions. Despite this, Edgar was given a rare start in the last game of the season against Cardiff City and despite drawing 1–1, he made impression during the match.

In the 2011–12 season, Edgar soon became the regular starting centre-back under the management of Eddie Howe. Edgar scored two goals in four minutes to lead Burnley to a 3–2 away win over Hull City on November 26. One of his goals against Hull City resulted him being awarded for West Yorkshire Clarets Away day goals of the season. He then set up a goal for Danny Ings to score his first Burnley goal, in a 5–1 win over Portsmouth on March 31, 2012. Despite missing out two appearances, due to being on the substitute bench, Edgar went on to make forty–nine (44 league) and scoring two times in all competitions.

In the 2012–13 season, Edgar continued to be in a first team regular despite competing threats from new signing Jason Shackell. As a result, Manager Sean Dyche placed him in a midfielder position on several occasions following a midfield crisis. Although he played out different positions in both defender and midfielder, he was also placed on the substitute bench. It wasn't until on February 9, 2013, when he scored his first Burnley goal, in a 2–1 loss against Bolton Wanderers. His second goal of the season then came on April 20, 2013, in a 1–1 draw against Cardiff City. He went on to make thirty appearances (twenty–seven in the league) and scoring two times in all competitions.

In the 2013–14 season, Edgar struggled in the first team, with Michael Duff and Shackhell preferred in the centre–back instead. Throughout the season, Edgar spent most of the 2013–14 season on the substitute bench. Despite this, Edgar made his first start of the season in the second round of League Cup, in a 2–0 win over Preston North End on August 27, 2013. Then, on October 1, 2013, he made his first league start of the season, in a 2–0 win over Doncaster Rovers. As the 2013–14 season progressed, Edgar played occasionally and spent the season on the substitute bench, resulting him making twenty–one appearances in all competitions. Following Burnley's promotion to the Premier League, Edgar was one of four players released by the club following the expiry of their contracts.

==== Loan to Swansea City ====
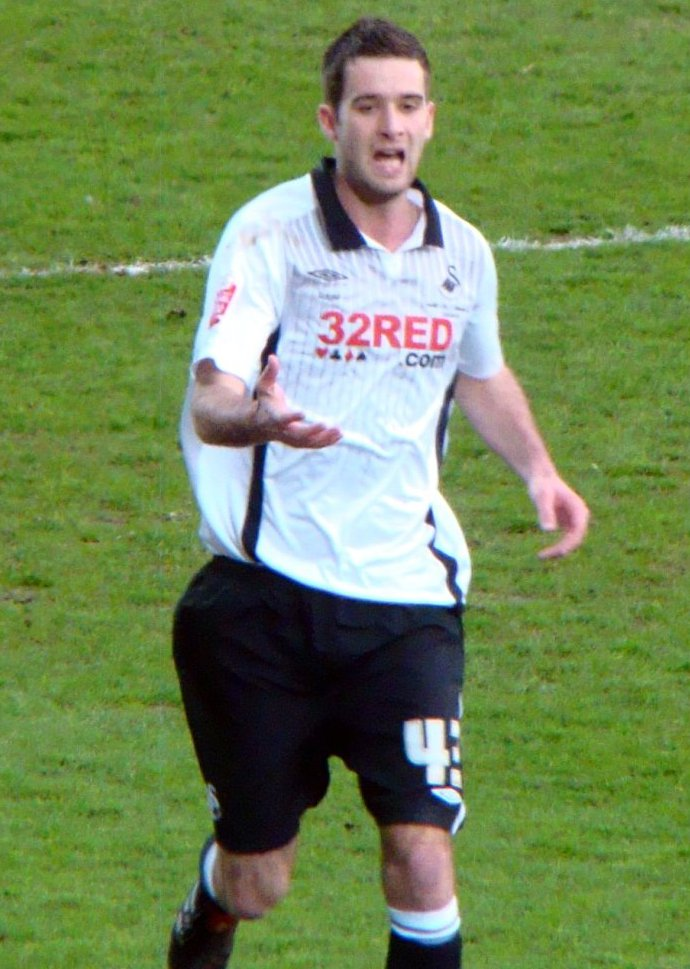
Edgar playing for Swansea City in 2010

On March 23, 2010, Edgar moved to Championship side Swansea City on a loan extending to the end of the season. Edgar made his Swansea City debut on March 27, 2010, where he made his first start, in a 0–0 draw against Ipswich Town. Edgar scored his first goal for Swansea on April 5, 2010, in a 3–0 victory over Scunthorpe United; he opened the scoring in the 27th minute "from close range after a well-worked short corner". In his time with Swansea, Edgar made five league appearances and scored that one goal.

After announcing his desire to leave Burnley to get first team football, it was reported on January 31, 2011, that Edgar would once again join Swansea City for the remainder of the season, but a couple of weeks later he returned to Burnley after FIFA refused to grant international clearance because of an irregularity in the paperwork.

=== Birmingham City ===
On June 12, 2014, Edgar joined Championship club Birmingham City on a two-year contract. Upon joining Birmingham City, Edgar was reunited with Manager Lee Clark, who commented that he could play a central role for the side. In addition to joining the club, Edgar was given a number six shirt ahead of the new season.

He made his debut in the starting eleven for the opening-day defeat at Middlesbrough, and opened the scoring in a 2–2 draw with Ipswich Town on August 19. For his performance against Ipswich Town, Edgar was named Man of the Match and did so for the second time against Brentford. As a result, Edgar was named August's Player of the Month. However, Edgar was sent–off in the 7th minute against AFC Bournemouth, as they lost 8–0. Following this, Edgar was dropped from the first team after they signed Michael Morrison. Up until that point, Edgar became a first team regular at the start of the season, establishing himself as centre-back of choice alongside captain Paul Robinson. He was released by Birmingham when his contract expired at the end of the 2015–16 season.

==== Loan spells ====
Edgar joined fellow Championship club Huddersfield Town on January 21, 2015, on loan for the remainder of the season. After joining the club, Manager Gary Rowett explained Edgar's departure to Huddersfield Town, stating that he wouldn't be guarantee a first team football, with competing defenders and midfielders as the reason. He made his début in the 1–0 win over Wigan Athletic three days later and finished the season with twelve appearances, of which nine were as a member of the starting eleven. Following this, Edgar returned to his parent club at the end of the season.

Edgar joined League One Sheffield United on August 10, 2015, on a season-long loan. Edgar made his Sheffield United debut five days after signing for the club, making his full debut, in a 2–0 win over Chesterfield. Since then, Edgar established in the first team regular at Sheffield United and competed with Jay McEveley and Neill Collins over the central defensive positions. However, he suffered a hamstring injury that kept him out for a month. Edgar returned to the first team from injury on November 24, 2015, coming on as a second-half substitute, in a 4–2 loss against Shrewsbury Town. It wasn't until on December 28, 2015, when he scored his first goal for the club, in a 3–1 win over Bradford City. His second goal for the club came on January 16, 2016, scoring a winning goal, in a 2–1 win over Colchester United. At the end of the 2015–16 season, having made thirty–eight appearances and scoring two times in all competitions, he returned to his parent club despite keen on joining the club on a permanent basis.

=== Vancouver Whitecaps FC ===
Edgar's contract with Birmingham City concluded in May 2016 and he was subsequently released from the club. Edgar signed an 18-month contract with Vancouver Whitecaps FC, following his participation in team training during a recent away game against Canadian rivals Toronto FC, placing him at the club through to the end of the 2017 MLS season.

After appearing once for the Whitecaps FC 2 against Sacramento Republic on July 24, 2016, Edgar officially made his Vancouver Whitecaps debut on August 6, 2016, where he started in a 2–0 loss against Colorado Rapids. Throughout the 2016 season, Edgar became a first-team regular, and went on to make eight appearances for the club. However, he reflected on his 2016 season at the club as "weird" and felt he hadn't had a full season.

Ahead of the 2017 season, Edgar was involved in an accident in Arizona after he was hit by a vehicle on December 17, 2016, injuring his right knee. Following this, he then had surgery and it was announced that he would be out for months.

=== Nashville SC ===
On April 4, 2018, USL side Nashville SC announced that he had been signed to their roster. He was given jersey number 11. On May 23, 2018, Nashville announced that they had mutually agreed to part ways with Edgar.

=== Ottawa Fury ===
Edgar joined Ottawa Fury FC on August 8, 2018. After the 2018 season, the Fury announced that Edgar would not return for the 2019 season.

=== Hartlepool United ===
In February 2019 Edgar was training with English club Bradford City, with a view to a deal. On March 7, 2019, he signed for Hartlepool United on a short-term contract. Edgar left the club at the end of the season.

=== Forge FC ===
On August 2, 2019, Edgar signed with Canadian Premier League club Forge FC. He made his debut for Forge on August 18 against Valour FC. Edgar scored his first goal for the club on September 18 against HFX Wanderers in extra time, securing a 1–1 draw at Wanderers Grounds. Edgar helped Forge finish second in the overall table and qualify for the 2019 Canadian Premier League Finals against Cavalry FC, where they would emerge victorious and capture the championship.

In January 2020 Forge announced Edgar would be returning for the 2020 season. He started 10 of 11 games in the COVID-19 shortened campaign as Forge won their second consecutive league title. On November 30, 2020, Edgar announced he would retire after Forge's last match of that year.

== International career ==
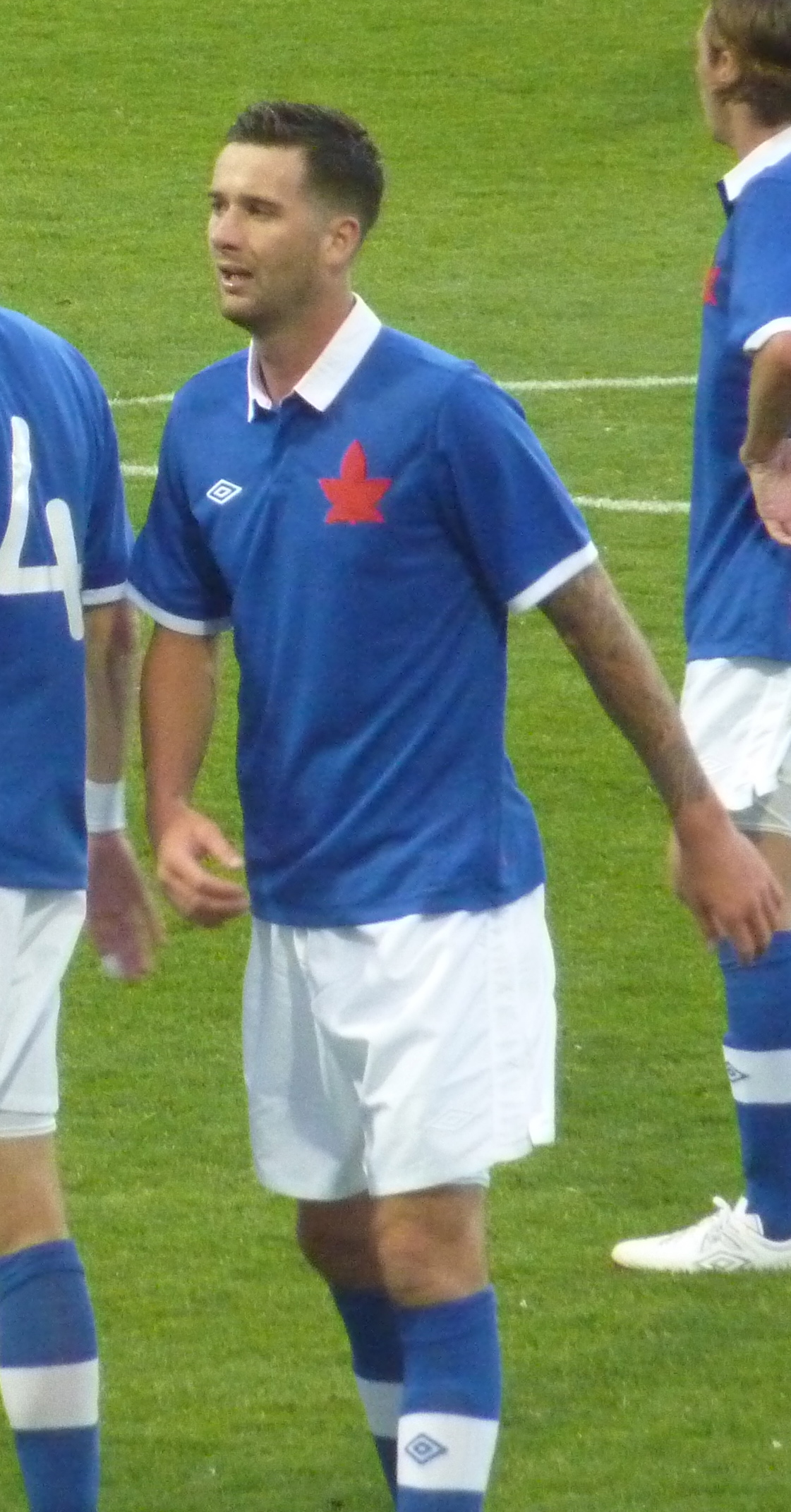
Edgar playing against the United States at BMO Field on June 3, 2012, for The CSA's Centenary match

=== Youth ===
He made his debut for the Canada under-20 team on October 15, 2003, (just three months after first appearing at under-17 level), against Panama at the Torneo Mondialito, aged 16. The following month, he was named in the Canada squad for the World Youth Championships, that took place in the UAE. Edgar was an unused substitute in each of Canada's matches, as they finished third in their group. In June 2005, Edgar was involved in the competition for a second time, appearing in all three of Canada's matches at the 2005 FIFA World Youth Championship in Netherlands. Canada finished bottom of their group. On February 1, 2006, he was named as Canadian Youth Player of the Year for the 2006 season.

In 2007, he helped host Canada compete for the Under-20 World Cup and had been named as one of six ambassadors for the Canadian team during the competition, which was the largest single-sport event ever hosted by Canada. Edgar picked up a groin injury three weeks before the tournament began, which put doubt over how much he would play. An MRI scan showed no tears in his abdominal wall, which helped quell fears that he would be lost to injury for the tournament.

=== Senior ===
In November 2008, he was on the bench for Canada's 2010 World Cup qualifier against Jamaica. Such was his form at the start of the 2010–11 season for Burnley, Edgar was called up to the Canadian senior team for their friendly against Ukraine on October 8, but again failed to make an appearance.

Edgar was called up again by Canada in the country's next game, a friendly against Greece. David made his senior team debut for Canada on February 9, 2011, as a second half sub in a 1–0 loss to Greece, the game was played at the brand new AEL FC Arena. Edgar was one of three Canadian players to make their international senior debut against Greece; Tosaint Ricketts and Milan Borjan were the other two.

Edgar was selected for the 2011 CONCACAF Gold Cup Canadian 23-man roster as a replacement for Dejan Jakovic, who sustained a hamstring injury in a friendly approaching the tournament. Edgar did not join the team since he was a late addition during Canada's disappointing Gold Cup, with an early exit out of the group stage. Edgar became a regular starter for the national team in late 2011. He assisted Olivier Occean's game-winning goal against Cuba in 2014 FIFA World Cup qualification on June 8, 2012. He scored his first goal for Canada in a crucial World Cup qualification match against Cuba on October 12; the match ended in a 3–0 Canadian victory.

On June 27, 2013, Edgar was listed as a member of Colin Miller's confirmed 23-man squad for the 2013 CONCACAF Gold Cup.

Edgar was given the captain's armband for the first time during opening game of the 2015 CONCACAF Gold Cup against El Salvador due to a last minute injury to Julian de Guzman, the game ended in a 0–0 draw. The following 2016 saw Edgar scored two goals in six national appearance for the side against Uzbekistan and El Salvador.

== Style of play ==
Edgar has been acknowledged for having good leadership skills; he has been described as a player who organizes the other members of his defensive line through his vocality. Dale Mitchell, Edgar's coach for the Canada Under-20 team, has labelled Edgar as a player who rises to the occasion against top competition, stabilizes the defence, and also has the ability to stretch opposing teams' defences.

== Coaching career ==
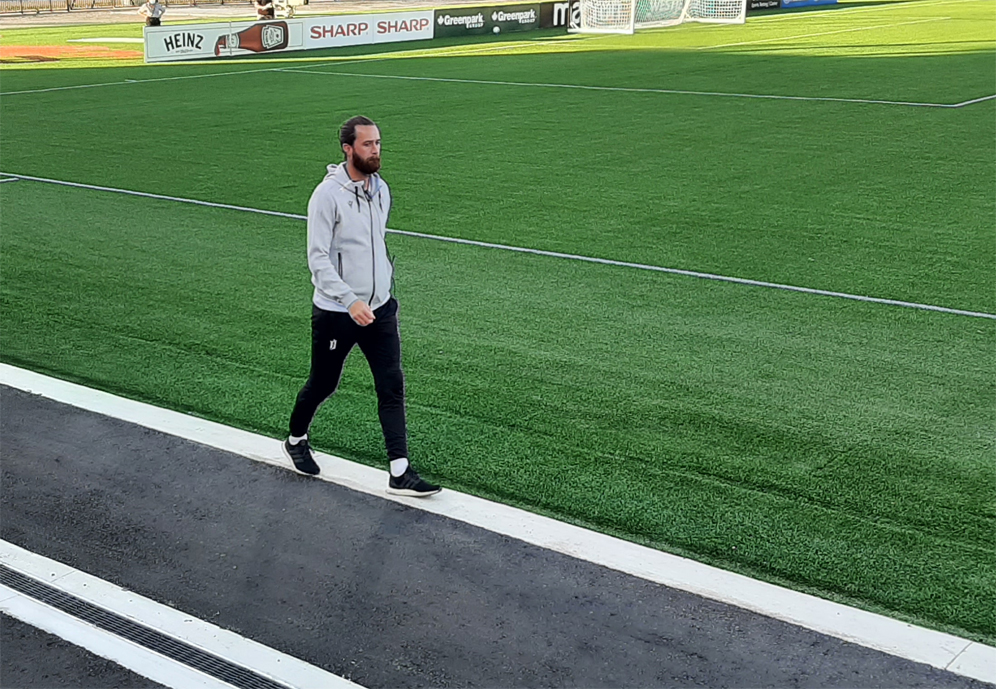
Edgar as assistant coach of Forge FC in 2021

On April 29, 2021, Edgar rejoined Forge FC as an assistant coach, replacing the departing Peter Reynders. In March 2025, he departed the club.

== Personal life ==
Edgar's father, Eddie Edgar, is a former professional soccer player who played as a goalkeeper for Newcastle United and Hartlepool United in England, as well as the New York Cosmos in the United States. His mother is a teacher.

In April 2013, Edgar was granted compassionate leave to be with his fiancée in Canada when she gave birth to their first child. His now-wife, Natalia, is also a Kitchener native; she continued to live in their hometown during his European career. Since joining Forge, David now lives with her and their two daughters at their Kitchener home.

== Career statistics ==
=== Club ===
Appearances and goals by club, season and competition
Club	Season	League			National Cup (Note: Includes appearances in the FA Cup.)		League Cup (Note: Includes appearances in the EFL Cup and Canadian Premier League Finals.)		Continental (Note: Includes appearances in CONCACAF Champions League and CONCACAF League.)		Total	
Club	Season	Division	Apps	Goals	Apps	Goals	Apps	Goals	Apps	Goals	Apps	Goals
Newcastle United	2006–07	Premier League	3	1	1	0	0	0	—		4	1
Newcastle United	2007–08	Premier League	5	0	0	0	1	0	—		6	0
Newcastle United	2008–09	Premier League	11	1	1	0	1	0	—		13	1
Newcastle United	Total		19	2	2	0	2	0	0	0	23	2
Burnley	2009–10	Premier League	4	0	1	0	1	0	—		6	0
Burnley	2010–11	Championship	7	0	0	0	1	0	—		8	0
Burnley	2011–12	Championship	44	2	1	0	4	0	—		49	2
Burnley	2012–13	Championship	27	2	1	0	2	0	—		30	2
Burnley	2013–14	Championship	17	0	0	0	4	0	—		21	0
Burnley	Total		99	4	3	0	12	0	0	0	114	4
Swansea City (loan)	2009–10	Championship	5	1	—		—		—		5	1
Birmingham City	2014–15	Championship	16	1	1	0	2	0	—		19	1
Huddersfield Town (loan)	2014–15	Championship	12	0	—		—		—		12	0
Sheffield United (loan)	2015–16	League One	36	2	1	0	1	0	—		38	2
Vancouver Whitecaps FC	2016	Major League Soccer	8	0	0	0	—		1	0	9	0
Vancouver Whitecaps FC	2017	Major League Soccer	0	0	0	0	—		0	0	0	0
Vancouver Whitecaps FC	Total		8	0	0	0	0	0	1	0	9	0
Whitecaps FC 2 (loan)	2016	United Soccer League	1	0	—		—		—		1	0
Nashville SC	2018	United Soccer League	5	0	0	0	—		—		5	0
Ottawa Fury	2018	United Soccer League	7	0	0	0	—		—		7	0
Hartlepool United	2018–19	National League	9	0	0	0	0	0	—		9	0
Forge FC	2019	Canadian Premier League	9	1	0	0	2	0	2	0	13	1
Forge FC	2020	Canadian Premier League	9	0	0	0	1	0	4	0	14	0
Forge FC	Total		18	1	0	0	3	0	6	0	27	1
Career total			235	11	7	0	20	0	7	0	269	11

=== International ===
As of match played March 24, 2018

Appearances and goals by national team and year
National team	Year	Apps	Goals
Canada	2011	7	0
Canada	2012	8	1
Canada	2013	7	0
Canada	2014	4	1
Canada	2015	9	0
Canada	2016	6	2
Canada	2017	0	0
Canada	2018	1	0
Total		42	4

As of match played September 6, 2016. Canada score listed first, score column indicates score after each Edgar goal.

International goals by date, venue, cap, opponent, score, result and competition
No.	Date	Venue	Cap	Opponent	Score	Result	Competition
1	October 12, 2012	BMO Field, Toronto, Canada	14	Cuba	3–0	3–0	2014 FIFA World Cup qualification
2	September 9, 2014	BMO Field, Toronto, Canada	24	Jamaica	1–1	3–1	Friendly
3	June 7, 2016	Thermenstadion, Bad Waltersdorf, Austria	37	Uzbekistan	1–0	2–1	Friendly
4	September 6, 2016	BC Place, Vancouver, Canada	39	El Salvador	3–1	3–1	2018 FIFA World Cup qualification

== Honours ==
Forge FC

- Canadian Premier League: 2019, 2020

Individual

- Canadian U-20 International Player of the Year: 2006
- Under-20 World Cup All-Star Team: 2007
