= Rasheed Bertrand =

Dominican international footballer

Personal information
- Date of birth: 2 September 1982 (age 44)
- Place of birth: Dominica

Team information
- Current team: Dublanc FC

Senior career*
Years	Team	Apps	(Gls)
2009	London City		
2016–	Dublanc FC		

International career^{‡}
2010–	Dominica	11	(0)
- * Club domestic league appearances and goals ‡ National team caps and goals as of 22 February 2017

Rasheed Bertrand (November 2, 1982) is a Dominican international footballer who plays with Dublanc FC in the Dominica Premier League.

== Playing career ==
Bertrand played with London City of the Canadian Soccer League in 2009. In 2016, he signed with Dublanc FC of the Dominica Premier League.

== International career ==
He made his international debut on September 25, 2010, against Barbados. He has made a total of 11 appearances for the national team.
