= Niels Dekker =

Dutch born Canadian former soccer player

Personal information
- Full name: Martinus Dekker
- Date of birth: 22 April 1983 (age 43)
- Place of birth: Warmenhuizen, Netherlands
- Position: Midfielder

Senior career*
Years	Team	Apps	(Gls)
1999	London City	4	(0)
2002–2003	ASD Massa Lombarda		
2004	BVV Barendrecht		
2005–2006	Toronto Lynx	35	(0)
- * Club domestic league appearances and goals

Niels Dekker (born April 22, 1983) is a Dutch born Canadian former soccer player who played in the Canadian Professional Soccer League, Eccellenza, Hoofdklasse, and the USL First Division.

== Playing career ==
Dekker began playing at the youth level at East Elgin Secondary School, where he was a 3 time MVP. In 1999, he signed with London City in the Canadian Professional Soccer League. He featured in the postseason semi-final match against the Toronto Olympians, where London was defeated 4-1. In 2002, he went abroad to Italy where he played with ASD Massa Lombarda in the Eccellenza. After two seasons in the Eccellenza he returned to the Netherlands to play with BVV Barendrecht in the Hoofdklasse. In 2005, he returned to Canada to sign with the Toronto Lynx of the USL First Division. He made his debut on April 23, 2005, against Portland Timbers. The following season he helped his team to a 10-game undefeated streak at home, and also reached the Open Canada Cup final, but finished runners up to Ottawa St. Anthony Italia.
