= Jeremy Caranci =

Canadian soccer player

Personal information
- Full name: Jeremy Aldo Caranci
- Date of birth: 11 January 1993 (age 33)
- Place of birth: London, Ontario
- Position: Midfielder

Senior career*
Years	Team	Apps	(Gls)
2011	London City B	18	(9)
2012–2013	Benevento Calcio	1	(0)
2013–2014	Barletta	3	(0)
- * Club domestic league appearances and goals

Jeremy Caranci (born January 11, 1993) is a Canadian soccer player who played in the Canadian Soccer League, Lega Pro, and Serie D.

== Playing career ==
Caranci began his career in 2011 with London City of the Canadian Soccer League. Throughout the season he played in the CSL Second Division with London's reserve squad, and recorded nine goals. The league awarded him with the CSL D2 Rookie of the Year award. In 2012, he went abroad to Italy to sign with Benevento Calcio in the Lega Pro. He first featured in the youth ranks till eventually making an appearance with the senior team. In 2013, he signed with A.S.D. Barletta 1922 in the Serie D after making three appearances with the club he was released at the conclusion of the season.
