= 2003 Open Canada Cup =

Tournament details
- Country: Canada
- Teams: 22

Final positions
- Champions: London City (1st title)
- Runners-up: Metro Lions

Tournament statistics
- Matches played: 21
- Goals scored: 79 (3.76 per match)
- Top goal scorer: (Canada) Craig Patton (4 goals)

The 2003 Open Canada Cup was the 6th edition of the Canadian Professional Soccer League's open league cup tournament, running from mid-May through early September. London City defeated Metro Lions 4-2 in a penalty shootout in the final played at the Cove Road Stadium, London, Ontario. The victory gave London its first piece of silverware and brought an end to the Ottawa Wizards' Canada Cup dynasty. The 2003 edition of the Canada Cup was a historical milestone achieved by the CPSL by opening the tournament to all Canadian professional and amateur clubs to provide a potential candidate for the CONCACAF Champions' Cup and a $10,000 reward for the champion. The last time a Canadian club competed in the Champions' Cup was in the 1976 CONCACAF Champions' Cup, represented by Toronto Italia of the National Soccer League, the predecessor league of the CPSL.

The tournament featured several clubs from the Ontario League, Ottawa Carleton Soccer League, Western Ontario League, and the Ligue de Soccer Elite Quebec. The Ontario amateur clubs began the tournament in the preliminary rounds, and the CPSL & LSEQ clubs were given a bye to the second round. While defending champions Ottawa Wizards received an automatic bye to the quarterfinals. For the second straight year, London City were awarded the hosting rights to the finals, which granted them a wild card match if they were defeated in the earlier rounds. Despite the CPSL's successful attempt in organizing a national tournament, the competition was without controversy. The controversy stemmed from a dispute involving the Ottawa Wizards with the CPSL's board of directors over the hosting rights for the finals. After failing to confirm their participation in the later rounds of the tournament, the league removed Ottawa from the competition, and in return, Ottawa threatened to obtain an injunction. The dispute eventually reached the Superior Court of Justice, which ruled in favor of the CPSL decision and allowed the tournament to proceed without the participation of Ottawa.

== Qualification ==
Enter in Preliminary Round	Enter in Second Round	Enter in Quarter-final
OSL/OCSL/WOSL; 5 teams/1 team/2 teams	CPSL/LSEQ; 12 teams/1 team	CPSL; 1 team
Ontario Soccer League: Real Richmond Hill; Toronto Benfica; Toronto Peniche; Whitby Iroquois SC; Woodbridge Azzuri; Ottawa Carleton Soccer League: Kanata; Western Ontario Soccer League: AEK London; Exeter Centennials	Canadian Professional Soccer League: Brampton Hitmen; Durham Flames; Hamilton Thunder; Laval Dynamites; London City; Metro Lions; Mississauga Olympians; North York Astros; St. Catharines Wolves; Toronto Croatia; Toronto Supra; Vaughan Sun Devils; Ligue de Soccer Elite Quebec: FC Levski Montreal	Canadian Professional Soccer League: Ottawa Wizards

== First round ==
May 17, 2003	Kanata (OCSL)	7–0	Whitby Iroquois (OSL)	London, Ontario
7:00 ET	Sylvain Cloutier 4'; Huffman Eja-Tabe 22'; Sylvain Cloutier 28'; Pavel Cancura 45'; Louie Legakis 52'; Huffman Eja-Tabe 62'; Manny Mendez 69'	(Report)		Stadium: Cove Road Stadium

May 18, 2003	Toronto Benfica (OSL)	2–1	Real Richmond Hill (OSL)	London, Ontario
7:00 ET	Philipe Silva 38'; Fred Pereira 48'	(Report)	Stuart Black 89'	Stadium: Cove Road Stadium

May 19, 2003	Exeter Centennials (WOSL)	1–3	Toronto Peniche (OSL)	London, Ontario
7:00 ET	Nathan Davies 48'	(Report)	Alexandre Freixo 2'; Adiel Guilherme 39'; Jorge Carvalho 70'	Stadium: Cove Road Stadium

June 27, 2003	AEK London (WOSL)	6–1	Woodbridge Azzuri (OSL)	London, Ontario
8:30 ET	Jim Tsaprailis 4'; Jim Tsaprailis; Jim Balatsoukas; Matt Gallo; Xavier Patural; Gistard De Gourville	(Report)		Stadium: Cove Road Stadium

== Second round ==
June 27, 2003	St. Catharines Wolves (CPSL)	1–0	Toronto Benfica (OSL)	St. Catharines, Ontario
8:30 ET	Tony Carbonara 32'	(Report)		Stadium: Club Roma Stadium

June 28, 2003	Metro Lions (CPSL)	3–0	Brampton Hitmen (CPSL)	Toronto, Ontario
8:00 ET	Darryl Gomez 39'; Darryl Gomez 58'; Kareem Reynolds 70'	(Report)		Stadium: Birchmount Stadium

June 28, 2003	Hamilton Thunder (CPSL)	3–4	Vaughan Sun Devils (CPSL)	London, Ontario
8:30 ET	Kevin De Serpa 3'; Stalin Cardenas 63'; Jason Crnic 67'	(Report)	Aundrea Rollins 2'; Bayete Smith 45'; Cameron Medwin 60'; Matthew Palleschi 77'	Stadium: Cove Road Stadium

June 29, 2003	Toronto Croatia (CPSL)	2–4	Toronto Supra (CPSL)	London, Ontario
4:30 ET	Edin Kalic 14'; Josip Bucic 47'	(Report)	Danny Amaral 38'; Avio Silva 51'; Jarek Radzinski 62'; Michael Di Luca 70'	Stadium: Cove Road Stadium

June 29, 2003	Kanata (OCSL)	3–2	FC Levski Montreal (LSEQ)	Carp, Ontario
4:00 ET		(Report)		Stadium: OZ Stadium

June 30, 2003	London City (CPSL)	2–1 (a.e.t.)	Toronto Peniche (OSL)	London, Ontario
8:30 ET	Andrew Loague 90'; Erik Elmauer 93'	(Report)	Bruno Real 45'	Stadium: Cove Road Stadium

July 1, 2003	North York Astros (CPSL)	0–2	Durham Flames (CPSL)	London, Ontario
3:15 ET		(Report)	Jamal Jupiter 38'; David Mills 58'	Stadium: Cove Road Stadium

July 1, 2003	AEK London (WOSL)	2–1	Mississauga Olympians (CPSL)	London, Ontario
7:00 ET	Ryan Leigh 37'; Matt Gallo 78'	(Report)	Geoff Attard 86'	Stadium: Cove Road Stadium

== Quarter-final ==
August 1, 2003	London City (CPSL)	1–2	St. Catharines Wolves (CPSL)	London, Ontario
8:30 ET	Tafaj 40'	(Report)	Thomas Latocha 36'; Carlo Arghittu 83'	Stadium: Cove Road Stadium

August 2, 2003	Ottawa Wizards (CPSL)	1–0	Laval Dynamites (CPSL)	Carp, Ontario
4:00 ET	Peter Mponda 90'	(Report)		Stadium: OZ Stadium

August 4, 2003	Toronto Supra (CPSL)	0–1	Kanata (OCSL)	Thornhill, Ontario
3:00 ET		(Report)	Pavel Cancura 86'	Stadium: Dufferin District Field; Attendance: 30; Referee: Yahkov Keimach (Ontario)

August 4, 2003	Vaughan Sun Devils (CPSL)	3–5	Metro Lions (CPSL)	Thornhill, Ontario
5:30 ET	Fitzroy Powell 11'; Paul Sinisi 66'; Matthew Palleschi 87'	(Report)	Hayden Fitzwilliams 3'; Craig Patton 6'; Michael Levkov 9'; Craig Patton 48'; Craig Patton 90'	Stadium: Dufferin District Field

August 4, 2003	Durham Flames (CPSL)	3–0	AEK London (WOSL)	Thornhill, Ontario
8:00 ET	Desmond Humphrey 35'; Jahmo Welch 81'; Desmond Humphrey 93'	(Report)		Stadium: Dufferin District Field

== Wild Card Game ==
August 29, 2003	London City (CPSL)	4–1	Durham Flames (CPSL)	London, Ontario
8:30 ET	Andrew Loague 5'; Ermal Murataj 55'; Andrew Loague 59'; Tafaj 74'	(Report)	Jahmo Welch 25'	Stadium: Cove Road Stadium

== Semi-final ==
August 31, 2003	St. Catharines Wolves (CPSL)	1–3	Metro Lions (CPSL)	London, Ontario
5:30 ET	Carlo Arghittu 57'	(Report)	Darryl Gomez 6'; Hayden Fitzwilliams 38'; Darryl Gomez 82'	Stadium: Cove Road Stadium

August 31, 2003	Kanata (OCSL)	0–2	London City (CPSL)	London, Ontario
8:30 ET		(Report)	Erik Elmauer; Phil McDonald	Stadium: Cove Road Stadium

== Final ==
September 1
3:45 ET

London City	1–1	Metro Lions
Tafaj 30'	Report	Craig Patton 84'
Penalties
Eris Tafaj (penalty scored); Gentian Dervishi (penalty scored); Erik Elmauer (penalty scored); Luan Jonuzi (penalty scored)	4 – 2	Kareem Reynolds (penalty missed); Jason Baker (penalty scored); Darryl Gomez (penalty missed); Hayden Fitzwilliams (penalty scored)

Cove Road Stadium, London, Ontario
Attendance: 225
Referee: Silviu Petrescu (Ontario)

GK	21	(Canada) Haidar Al-Shaibani
RB	2	(Canada) Erald Pope
CB	34	(Canada) Marco Peeters	(substituted off) 121'
LB	6	(Canada) Justin Medeiros
RM	8	(Albania) Gentian Dervishi
CM	24	(Canada) Tonino Commisso	(c)
CM	5	(Canada) Mark Boyd
LM	19	(Canada) Jeff Russell
ST	10	(Canada) Andrew Loague	(substituted off) 97'
CF	20	(Albania) Ermal Murataj
ST	11	(Albania) Eris Tafaj
Substitutes:
DF	3	(Canada) Erik Elmauer	(substituted on) 97'
MF	12	(Canada) Ken Kopko
ST	18	(Canada) Jermaine Shakes
MF	26	(Canada) Keith Andrew
MF	35	(Canada) Luan Jonuzi	(substituted on) 121'
Manager:
(Canada) Harry Gauss

GK	25	(Canada) Gregory Drakes
RB	14	(Canada) Kevin Ricketts
CB	16	(Canada) O'Neil Brown (c)
LB	4	(Canada) Jason Baker
RM	12	(Canada) Michael Levkov
CM	20	(Canada) Maxim Dorneval	(substituted off) 72'
CM	8	(Canada) Kareem Reynolds
CM	7	(Saint Vincent and the Grenadines) Caswain Mason	(substituted off) 117'
LM	9	(Saint Kitts and Nevis) Darryl Gomez
ST	19	(Canada) Craig Patton
ST	10	(Trinidad and Tobago) Hayden Fitzwilliams
Substitutes:
DF	13	(Trinidad and Tobago) Anton Skerritt	(substituted on) 117'
MF	22	(Canada) Christopher Clarke
FW	5	(Canada) Ilan Friedman
MF	6	(Canada) Marko Janjicek	(substituted on) 72'
Manager:
(Croatia) Goran Miscevic

Man of the Match:

Justin Medeiros (London City)

Assistant referees:
Amato DeLuca
Justin Tasev
Fourth official:
Vito Curalli

== Top scorers ==
Position	Player	Club	Goals
1	Craig Patton	Metro Lions	4
2	Eris Tafaj	London City	3
	Darryl Gomez	Metro Lions	3
	Andrew Loague	London City	3
