= Paul Victor (footballer) =

Dominican footballer

Personal information
- Full name: Paul David Victor
- Date of birth: 28 March 1984 (age 42)
- Place of birth: Dominica
- Position: Defender

Senior career*
| Years | Team | Apps | (Gls) |
| 2000 | London City | | |
| 2007–2008 | Harlem United FC | | |

International career
| 2000–2008 | Dominica | 11 | (0) |
- * Club domestic league appearances and goals

Paul Victor (born March 28, 1984) is a Dominican international footballer.

== Career ==
Victor played with London City of the Canadian Professional Soccer League in 2000. He made his debut on July 21, 2000, against the Toronto Olympians. In 2007 he played with Harlem United FC in the Dominica Premier League. He also played with the Dominica national football team, where he made his international debut on March 19, 2000, against Haiti. In total he has appeared in 11 matches.
