= Harry Gauss =

Soccer manager and businessman (1952–2009)

- Gauss (left) in 2006

Personal information
- Full name: Harry Paul Gauss
- Date of birth: September 29, 1952
- Place of birth: Stuttgart, West Germany
- Date of death: 31 October 2009 (aged 57)
- Place of death: London, Ontario, Canada

Senior career*
Years	Team	Apps	(Gls)
1971–1972	London German Canadians		
1973–1975	London City		

Managerial career
- 1990–1998: London City
- 2003–2006: London City
- * Club domestic league appearances and goals

Harry Paul Gauss (29 September 1952 – 31 October 2009) was a German-born Canadian soccer businessman, head coach, general manager, and soccer player.

Gauss was a noted soccer promoter primarily involved with London City SC, a club formed by his father Markus Gauss in 1973. His involvement with the club was felt in every aspect from player to administrative, and to managerial duties. He operated with London originally in the National Soccer League (NSL), and ultimately in the NSL's successor league the Canadian Soccer League (CSL). Under the tutelage of the Gauss family the club established a reputation for providing an opportunities, and developing young players to higher professional endeavors. In 2006, he was diagnosed with brain cancer, and subsequently died three years later after complications from surgery.

Upon his death his sons Ryan, and Sean primarily ran the organization until their sale of the club in late 2011. His contributions were recognized by the Ontario Soccer Association, and the Canadian Soccer League with the latter creating the Harry Paul Gauss Award in recognition of his commitment, and loyalty in promoting professional soccer.

== Club career ==
Gauss was born in Stuttgart, West Germany.

He played in the National Soccer League in 1971 with London German Canadians. He re-signed with London for the 1972 season. In 1973, his father Markus Gauss the former vice-president of German Canadian FC formed London City after acquiring the club's National Soccer League franchise rights. The elder Gauss would serve as the club's president, while his son Harry originally featured as a player for the organization.

== Managerial career ==
=== London City ===
After a short stint as a player, he began making the transition to the administrative field as the club's general manager. After departing the league in 1984 the team returned for the 1990 season after purchasing the rights from London Marconi.

He would also incorporate the role of head coach into his resume as he assumed the responsibility for the 1990 season. In 1993, the Canadian Soccer League merged with the NSL to form the Canadian National Soccer League (CNSL), where Gauss was named a league director. In 1998, the CNSL formed an alliance with the Ontario Soccer Association, and created the Canadian Professional Soccer League (CPSL) with London City as a charter member. Gauss accomplished his most notable achievement as a head coach in the 2003 Open Canada Cup tournament, where he secured the club's first piece of silverware. In 2004, he was selected as the head coach for the CPSL all-star match against Boavista F.C.

In 2007, he stepped a side from his active club role to concentrate on his health after being diagnosed with cancer and turned club operations over to his son Ryan. The Ontario Soccer Association awarded him for his 20 years of services to the sport with the Individual Meritorious Service Award. The Canadian Soccer League honored him by establishing the Harry Paul Gauss Award for individuals within the league who had demonstrated support, commitment and allegiance. On 31 October 2009 he lost a three-year battle with brain cancer after undergoing a 12-hour operation, a week before Christmas in 2006. In 2010, he was posthumously inducted into the Western Ontario Soccer League Hall of Fame.

Gauss was instrumental in establishing London City as a developing ground by providing experience to young players to the professional level.

=== Windsor and Port Huron ===
After three seasons as general manager for London City, he accepted an offer in 1977 from league rivals Windsor Stars in the capacity of general manager. During his tenure in Windsor, he secured the services of Jim Townsend as head coach and fielded a U-21 team as a reserve unit. Gauss's time with Windsor was short-lived as he resigned, citing a personality conflict with club president Norm Feuer. After his departure, head coach Townsend assumed his responsibilities.

In 1981, the Gauss family purchased the franchise rights of the Toronto Canadians with intentions of relocating the team to Port Huron, Michigan. The NSL league board of directors approved the transfer with intentions of operating in the 1982 season. League president George MacDonald and commissioner Job Jones inspected Memorial Stadium and reported their findings to the league members. Issues arose with obtaining a rental agreement contract with the Port Huron Area School District Board of Education for the usage of Memorial Stadium. The main obstacle to the agreement was a district bylaw preventing the usage of school facilities by outside parties.

In 2001, Gauss, along with several investors, submitted a proposal for a Windsor franchise in the Canadian Professional Soccer League.

== Personal life ==
Gauss' father, Markus, and mother, Magdalene, migrated with Harry and brother Reinhart from Stuttgart, Germany, to Canada in 1958. Gauss was raised in Ontario following a short stay in Montreal and Winnipeg, while his sister Linda was born in Canada. Gauss was married to his wife Kathleen for over 30 years. The couple had three sons: Paul, Sean, and Ryan. His sons were involved in the operation of the club, with Sean serving as head coach in the 2007 season. Ryan would assume the administrative and managerial duties of the club in 2007.

His father Markus was born in Filopova, a village in the Kingdom of Yugoslavia, and once settled in London, Ontario he established a masonry construction business. He became involved in soccer in 1958–59, originally with the German Canadians FC as a manager-coach. In 2003, he was inducted into the Western Ontario Soccer League Hall of Fame. In 2005, he was inducted into the London Sports Hall of Fame. He died in London, Ontario, on November 17, 2013, from cancer, while his wife, Magdalene, died in 2007.

== Honors ==
London City

- Open Canada Cup: 2003
