= Isa Bulku =

Albanian former footballer

Personal information
- Full name: Isa Bulku
- Place of birth: Albania
- Position: Forward

Senior career*
Years	Team	Apps	(Gls)
1999	Toronto Lynx	3	(0)
2003	London City SC	10	(0)
- * Club domestic league appearances and goals

Isa Bulku is an Albanian former footballer who played in the USL A- League, and the Canadian Professional Soccer League.

== Playing career ==
Bulku played with London Croatia in 1997. In 1999, he played with the Toronto Lynx of the USL A-League. He made his debut on July 8, 1999, against Connecticut Wolves. In total he played in 3 matches for the club. In 2003, he signed with London City of the Canadian Professional Soccer League. In 2011, he served as an assistant coach for London City under Luka Shaqiri.
