= Fabijan Knežević =

Canadian-Croatian footballer

Fabian Knežević
Personal information
- Full name: Fabian Jr. Knežević
- Date of birth: 4 December 1987 (age 38)
- Place of birth: London, Ontario, Canada
- Height: 1.88 m (6 ft 2 in)
- Position: Goalkeeper

Youth career
- –2005: London Croatia SC
- 2005–2006: NK Kamen Ingrad

Senior career*
Years	Team	Apps	(Gls)
2006–2007	NK Kamen Ingrad	2	(0)
2007–2010	HNK Šibenik	0	(0)
2008–2009	→ NK Zagora Unešić (loan)	14	(0)
2009–2010	→ Primorac Biograd (loan)	9	(0)
2011	London City SC	18	(0)
- * Club domestic league appearances and goals

Fabian Knežević (born 4 December 1987) is a Canadian-Croatian footballer who played in the Croatian First Football League, Croatian Third Football League, and the Canadian Soccer League.

== Career ==
Knežević began his career with NK Kamen Ingrad, where he played in his first two professionals games in the Prva HNL, and signed than a contract with HNK Šibenik in summer 2007. After one year with the reserve of HNK Šibenik was loaned out to NK Zagora Unešić for one season in August 2008. He was subsequently loaned to HNK Primorac in the Croatian Third Football League. In 2011, he returned to his hometown to sign with London City in the Canadian Soccer League.
