= 2017 Scarborough SC season =

Scarborough SC
2017 season
- Owner: Angel Belchev
- Head Coach: Krum Bibishkov
- Canadian Soccer League: 4th place (First Division)
- CSL Championship: Final
- Top goalscorer: Aleksandar Stojiljković (17 goals)
Home colours	Away colours

The 2017 Scarborough SC season was the third season in the club's participation in the Canadian Soccer League. They began the season on May 27, 2017 at home against York Region Shooters. The season concluded with Scarborough securing a postseason berth by finishing fourth in the standings. In the preliminary rounds of the playoffs they secured the necessary wins in order to make their first CSL Championship appearance. In the finals they were defeated by the York Region Shooters in a penalty shootout.

== Summary ==
In preparation for the 2017 season general manager Kiril Dimitrov acquired the services of Krum Bibishkov as a Player-coach. Scarborough continued its policy of recruiting overseas talent in order to bring more depth to the roster. Throughout the majority of the season the team battled for the fourth position standing, until achieving a five game undefeated streak at the end of the season in order to clinch that berth. Their overall success saw the club finish in the top four in best offensive and defensive records with Aleksandar Stojiljković winning the CSL Golden Boot. In the first round of the postseason they faced Brantford Galaxy, and advanced to the next round after a 6-2 victory. Scarborough made club history by defeating FC Vorkuta by a score of 1-0 to make their first CSL Championship final appearance. Their opponents in the finals were York Region Shooters, where Scarborough was denied the title after a 5-4 defeat in a penalty shootout.

== Transfers ==
=== In ===
No.	Pos.	Player	Transferred from	Fee/notes	Source
	FW	(Bulgaria) Krum Bibishkov	(Canada) Brantford Galaxy	Free Transfer	
	GK	(Serbia) Milos Djurkovic	(Bosnia and Herzegovina) FK Radnik Bijeljina	Free Transfer	
	GK	(Sierra Leone) John Trye	(United States) ASA Charge	Free Transfer	

=== Out ===
No.	Pos.	Player	Transferred to	Fee/notes	Source
11	MF	(Israel) Alon Badat	(Canada) FC Ukraine United	Free Transfer	
14	MF	(Bosnia and Herzegovina) Adis Hasecic	(Canada) SC Waterloo Region	Free Transfer	

== Competitions ==
=== Canadian Soccer League ===
==== League table ====
===== First Division =====
Pos	Team	Pld	W	D	L	GF	GA	GD	Pts	Qualification
1	FC Vorkuta (C)	14	10	2	2	43	13	+30	32	Playoffs
2	Serbian White Eagles	14	9	4	1	38	14	+24	31	Playoffs
3	York Region Shooters (O)	14	9	3	2	34	7	+27	30	Playoffs
4	Scarborough SC	14	7	3	4	37	17	+20	24	Playoffs
5	Brantford Galaxy	14	6	0	8	26	37	−11	18	Playoffs
6	Milton SC	14	2	2	10	24	75	−51	8	Playoffs
7	SC Waterloo Region	14	1	5	8	19	33	−14	8	Playoffs
8	Royal Toronto FC	14	1	3	10	20	45	−25	6	Playoffs

Updated to match(es) played on September 11, 2017. Source: []
Rules for classification: 1) points; 2) goal difference; 3) number of goals scored.
(C) Champions; (O) Play-off winners

==== Results summary ====
Overall								Home						Away					
Pld	W	D	L	GF	GA	GD	Pts	W	D	L	GF	GA	GD	W	D	L	GF	GA	GD
14	7	3	4	37	17	+20	24	4	1	2	19	4	+15	3	2	2	18	13	+5

Last updated: September 10, 2017.
Source: CSL

==== Results by round ====
Round	1	2	3	4	5	6	7	8	9	10	11	12	13	14
Ground	H	A	A	H	H	A	H	H	A	A	A	H	H	A
Result	D	L	W	L	W	W	L	W	L	D	D	W	W	W

Updated to match(es) played on September 10, 2017. Source: CSL
A = Away; H = Home; W = Win; D = Draw; L = Loss

==== Matches ====
May 27	Scarborough SC	0–0	York Region Shooters	Toronto, Ontario
		Report		Stadium: Birchmount Stadium

June 2	Serbian White Eagles	2–1	Scarborough SC	Toronto, Ontario
	Pešić 31'; Jočić 74'	Report	Dimitrov 24'	Stadium: Birchmount Stadium; Attendance: 100; Referee: Ramee Arbaji

June 11	Brantford Galaxy	2–5	Scarborough SC	Brantford, Ontario
		Report	Stojiljković,,, Melo	Stadium: Steve Brown Sports Complex

July 1	Scarborough SC	0–1	FC Vorkuta	Toronto, Ontario
		Report	Ivliev 13'	Stadium: Birchmount Stadium

July 8	York Region Shooters	2–0	Royal Toronto FC	Toronto, Ontario
	Stojiljković 4'; Bibishkov 65'	Report		Stadium: Birchmount Stadium

July 14	York Region Shooters	0–1	Scarborough SC	Vaughan, Ontario
		Report	Dimitrov 67'	Stadium: St. Joan Of Arc Turf Field

July 28	Scarborough SC	1–2	Serbian White Eagles	Toronto, Ontario
	Stefan Stoiljkovic 55'	Report	Miroslav Jovanović 48'; Kamberović 61'	Stadium: Esther Shiner Stadium; Attendance: 100; Referee: Ramee Arbaji

August 12	Scarborough SC	4–1	SC Waterloo	Toronto, Ontario
	Angel Angelov 5'; Alen Kucalovic; Stojiljković,	Report	Zelenbaba 61'	Stadium: Birchmount Stadium

August 19	FC Vorkuta	1–0	Scarborough SC	Toronto, Ontario
	Diachenko 65'	Report		Stadium: Esther Shiner Stadium

August 23	Milton SC	5–5	Scarborough SC	Milton, Ontario
	William Mokake, Scott Damion Tristan, Adnan Smajic	Report	Adrian Todorovic, Bibishkov, Karadachki	Stadium: Milton Community Park

August 27	Royal Toronto FC	3–3	Scarborough SC	Toronto, Ontario
		Report	Stojiljković,,	Stadium: Birchmount Stadium

September 2	Scarborough SC	7–0	Milton SC	Toronto, Ontario
	Stojiljković,,, Bibishkov, Marc Jankovic	Report		Stadium: Birchmount Stadium

September 8	Scarborough SC	5–0	Brantford Galaxy	Toronto, Ontario
	Marc Jankovic 15'; Dimitrov 48'; Stojiljković 60', 71', 78'	Report		Stadium: Birchmount Stadium

September 10	SC Waterloo	0–3	Scarborough SC	Waterloo, Ontario
		Report	Dimitrov 23', 70'; Stojiljković 35'	Stadium: Warrior Field

== Statistics ==
=== Goals ===
Correct as of November 10, 2017

First Division Goals
Pos.	Playing Pos.	Nation	Name	Appearances	Goals
1	FW	(Serbia)	Aleksandar Stojiljković	13	17
2	MF	(Bulgaria)	Kiril Dimitrov	14	6
3	MF	(Bulgaria)	Krum Bibishkov	15	5
4	DF	(Canada)	Marc Jankovic	11	2
4	DF	(Canada)	Adrian Todorovic	2	2
6	DF	(Bulgaria)	Angel Angelov	13	1
6	DF	(Bulgaria)	Zdravko Karadachki	5	1
6	MF	(Canada)	Alen Kucalovic	10	1
6	FW	(Canada)	Joey Melo	4	1
6	MF	(Serbia)	Stefan Stojiljković	14	1
Total				95	37
