= 2017 Brantford Galaxy season =

Brantford Galaxy
2017 season
- President: Tomo Dančetović
- Head Coach: Saša Vuković
- CSL: Quarterfinals
- Top goalscorer: Miroslav Čabrilo (6 goals)
Home colours	Away colours

The 2017 Brantford Galaxy season was the sixth season in the club's participation in the Canadian Soccer League. They began the season on May 29, 2017, away against Royal Toronto FC. The season concluded with Brantford securing a postseason berth by finishing fifth in the standings. In the preliminary round of the playoffs they were defeated by Scarborough SC.

== Summary ==
Before the commencement of the 2017 season a change in the managerial structure occurred with Saša Vuković being named the head coach. Throughout the regular season Brantford struggled to achieve significant results, but still was awarded a playoff berth after finishing fifth in the standings. Their reserve team fared slightly better results as they finished fourth in the standings. In the opening round of the postseason the senior squad was eliminated by Scarborough SC, while their reserve team advanced to the next round after defeating the Serbian White Eagles B. The following round they were eliminated from the playoff competition after a 7–0 defeat to FC Ukraine United.

== Competitions ==
=== Canadian Soccer League ===
==== League table ====
First Division
Pos	Team	Pld	W	D	L	GF	GA	GD	Pts	Qualification
1	FC Vorkuta (C)	14	10	2	2	43	13	+30	32	Playoffs
2	Serbian White Eagles	14	9	4	1	38	14	+24	31	Playoffs
3	York Region Shooters (O)	14	9	3	2	34	7	+27	30	Playoffs
4	Scarborough SC	14	7	3	4	37	17	+20	24	Playoffs
5	Brantford Galaxy	14	6	0	8	26	37	−11	18	Playoffs
6	Milton SC	14	2	2	10	24	75	−51	8	Playoffs
7	SC Waterloo Region	14	1	5	8	19	33	−14	8	Playoffs
8	Royal Toronto FC	14	1	3	10	20	45	−25	6	Playoffs

Updated to match(es) played on September 11, 2017. Source: canadiansoccerleague.ca
Rules for classification: 1) points; 2) goal difference; 3) number of goals scored.
(C) Champions; (O) Play-off winners

==== Results summary ====
Overall								Home						Away					
Pld	W	D	L	GF	GA	GD	Pts	W	D	L	GF	GA	GD	W	D	L	GF	GA	GD
14	6	0	8	26	37	−11	18	3	0	4	15	23	−8	3	0	4	11	14	−3

Last updated: September 10, 2017.
Source: CSL

==== Results by round ====
Round	1	2	3	4	5	6	7	8	9	10	11	12	13	14
Ground	A	A	H	H	H	A	A	H	H	A	A	H	H	A
Result	W	L	L	L	W	W	L	W	L	L	W	W	L	L

Updated to match(es) played on September 10, 2017. Source: CSL
A = Away; H = Home; W = Win; D = Draw; L = Loss

==== Matches ====
May 29	Royal Toronto FC	1–4	Brantford Galaxy	Toronto, Ontario
		Report		Stadium: Varsity Stadium

June 3	York Region Shooters	2–0	Brantford Galaxy	Vaughan, Ontario
	Bryan 54'; West 90'	Report		Stadium: St. Joan Of Arc Turf Field

June 11	Brantford Galaxy	2–5	Scarborough SC	Brantford, Ontario
		Report	Stojiljković,,, Melo	Stadium: Steve Brown Sports Complex

June 17	Brantford Galaxy	1–6	Serbian White Eagles	Brantford, Ontario
	Vukovic 86'	Report	Filip Velasevic 13'; Pešić 60'; Jočić 66', 73'; Miroslav Jovanović 85', 89'	Stadium: Steve Brown Sports Complex; Referee: Tony Amaral

June 24	Brantford Galaxy	4–1	Milton SC	Brantford, Ontario
	Maksim Bosic 17'; Dragan Milovic 35'; Cabrilo 41'; Vukovic 75'	Report	Fazlagić 78'	Stadium: Steve Brown Sports Complex

July 2	SC Waterloo	0–4	Brantford Galaxy	Waterloo, Ontario
		Report	Maksim Boksic; Simeunovic; Vukovic; Bojan Samardzija	Stadium: Warrior Field

July 7	Serbian White Eagles	2–0	Brantford Galaxy	Toronto, Ontario
	Dusan Kovačević 81'; Švonja 86'	Report		Stadium: Centennial Park Stadium; Attendance: 100; Referee: Javier Prior

July 15	Brantford Galaxy	3–1	Royal Toronto FC	Brantford, Ontario
	Cabrilo,	Report		Stadium: Steve Brown Sports Complex

July 22	Brantford Galaxy	1–2	York Region Shooters	Brantford, Ontario
		Report	Evan Beutler 85'	Stadium: Steve Brown Sports Complex

July 30	FC Vorkuta	4–0	Brantford Galaxy	Toronto, Ontario
	Ivliev, Svorak; Diachenko	Report		Stadium: Esther Shiner Stadium

August 9	Milton SC	0–3	Brantford Galaxy	Milton, Ontario
		Report		Stadium: Milton Community Center

August 19	Brantford Galaxy	2–1	SC Waterloo	Brantford, Ontario
		Report		Stadium: Steve Brown Sports Complex

August 26	Brantford Galaxy	2–7	FC Vorkuta	Brantford, Ontario
		Report	Ivliev, Svorak,	Stadium: Steve Brown Sports Complex

September 8	Scarborough SC	5–0	Brantford Galaxy	Toronto, Ontario
	Marc Jankovic 15'; Dimitrov 48'; Stojiljković 60', 71', 78'	Report		Stadium: Birchmount Stadium

==== League table ====
Second Division
Pos	Team	Pld	W	D	L	GF	GA	GD	Pts	Qualification
1	FC Ukraine United (C, O)	14	13	1	0	75	10	+65	40	Playoffs
2	Burlington SC	14	10	1	3	44	18	+26	31	Playoffs
3	FC Vorkuta B	14	8	0	6	41	25	+16	24	Playoffs
4	Brantford Galaxy B	14	7	1	6	29	35	−6	22	Playoffs
5	Serbian White Eagles B	14	6	0	8	32	59	−27	18	Playoffs
6	SC Waterloo B	14	5	1	8	26	39	−13	16	Playoffs
7	Royal Toronto B	14	5	0	9	32	58	−26	15	Playoffs
8	London City SC	14	0	0	14	11	46	−35	0	

Updated to match(es) played on September 7, 2017. Source: canadiansoccerleague.ca
Rules for classification: 1) points; 2) goal difference; 3) number of goals scored.
(C) Champions; (O) Play-off winners

==== Results summary ====
Overall								Home						Away					
Pld	W	D	L	GF	GA	GD	Pts	W	D	L	GF	GA	GD	W	D	L	GF	GA	GD
14	7	1	6	29	35	−6	22	4	0	3	15	17	−2	3	1	3	14	18	−4

Last updated: September 10, 2017.
Source: CSL

==== Results by round ====
Round	1	2	3	4	5	6	7	8	9	10	11	12	13	14
Ground	A	A	A	H	A	H	H	H	H	H	H	A	A	A
Result	W	W	L	L	L	W	W	L	W	W	L	W	D	L

Updated to match(es) played on September 10, 2017. Source: CSL
A = Away; H = Home; W = Win; D = Draw; L = Loss

== Statistics ==
=== Goals and assists ===
Correct as of November 30, 2017

First Division Goals
Pos.	Playing Pos.	Nation	Name	Appearances	Goals
1	MF	(Canada)	Miroslav Cabrilo	13	6
2	FW	(Canada)	Stefan Vukovic	13	4
3	DF	(Serbia)	Miljan Milovic	14	3
3	DF	(Serbia)	Bojan Samardzija	14	3
5	FW	(Canada)	Milan Beader	9	2
5	MF	(Canada)	Maksin Boksic	14	2
5	MF	(Serbia)	Dragan Milovic	13	2
8	DF	(Serbia)	Nemanja Simeunović	13	1
Total				103	26

Second Division Goals
Pos.	Playing Pos.	Nation	Name	Appearances	Goals
1	FW	(Canada)	Adam Villella	11	4
2	MF	(Canada)	Dexter Hamilton	12	2
2	FW	(Canada)	Semir Ibrahimi	3	2
2	FW	(Canada)	Pat Wilson	12	2
5	MF	(Canada)	Alen Audisho	6	1
5	MF	(Canada)	Daniel Banatkiewicz	4	1
5	DF	(Canada)	Michael Dhliwavo	9	1
5	MF	(Canada)	Gianni Gabriele	1	1
5	MF	(Canada)	Austin Hunt	6	1
5	MF	(Canada)	Camilo Veloza	11	1
Total				75	16
