= 2017 York Region Shooters season =

York Region Shooters
2017 season
- Owner: Tony De Thomasis
- Head Coach: Tony De Thomasis
- CSL: Champions
- Top goalscorer: Evan Beutler (7 goals)
Home colours	Away colours

The 2017 York Region Shooters season was the twentieth season in the club's participation in the Canadian Soccer League. Their season commenced on May 27, 2017 in an away match against Scarborough SC. The season concluded with York Region winning their third CSL Championship, after defeating Scarborough in a penalty shootout.

== Summary ==
York Region entered the 2017 season as the defending regular season champions with Tony De Thomasis continuing his role as head coach. Though their reserve team were the 2016 Second Division champions it was disbanded for the 2017 season. Their season started brightly with the Shooters achieving points in their first four matches, until conceiving their first defeat in the fifth week. The remainder of the season saw York Region clinch a postseason berth by finishing third in the standings with the best defensive record in the division. Their playoff journey began with a victory after Milton SC forfeited their match. In the second round of the postseason they defeated the Serbian White Eagles FC, and ultimately claimed their third CSL Championship by defeating Scarborough SC in the finals.

== Competitions ==
=== Canadian Soccer League ===
==== League table ====
===== First Division =====
Pos	Team	Pld	W	D	L	GF	GA	GD	Pts	Qualification
1	FC Vorkuta (C)	14	10	2	2	43	13	+30	32	Playoffs
2	Serbian White Eagles	14	9	4	1	38	14	+24	31	Playoffs
3	York Region Shooters (O)	14	9	3	2	34	7	+27	30	Playoffs
4	Scarborough SC	14	7	3	4	37	17	+20	24	Playoffs
5	Brantford Galaxy	14	6	0	8	26	37	−11	18	Playoffs
6	Milton SC	14	2	2	10	24	75	−51	8	Playoffs
7	SC Waterloo Region	14	1	5	8	19	33	−14	8	Playoffs
8	Royal Toronto FC	14	1	3	10	20	45	−25	6	Playoffs

Updated to match(es) played on September 11, 2017. Source: canadiansoccerleague.ca
Rules for classification: 1) points; 2) goal difference; 3) number of goals scored.
(C) Champions; (O) Play-off winners

==== Results summary ====
Overall								Home						Away					
Pld	W	D	L	GF	GA	GD	Pts	W	D	L	GF	GA	GD	W	D	L	GF	GA	GD
14	9	3	2	34	7	+27	30	4	1	2	18	5	+13	5	2	0	16	2	+14

Last updated: September 10, 2017.
Source: CSL

==== Results by round ====
Round	1	2	3	4	5	6	7	8	9	10	11	12	13	14
Ground	A	H	H	A	H	A	H	H	A	A	A	A	H	H
Result	D	W	W	W	L	W	D	L	W	W	W	D	W	W

Updated to match(es) played on September 10, 2017. Source: CSL
A = Away; H = Home; W = Win; D = Draw; L = Loss

==== Matches ====
May 27	Scarborough SC	0–0	York Region Shooters	Toronto, Ontario
		Report		Stadium: Birchmount Stadium

June 3	York Region Shooters	2–0	Brantford Galaxy	Vaughan, Ontario
	Bryan 54'; West 90'	Report		Stadium: St. Joan Of Arc Turf Field

June 12	York Region Shooters	7–0	Milton SC	Vaughan, Ontario
		Report		Stadium: St. Joan Of Arc Turf Field

June 18	SC Waterloo	0–2	York Region Shooters	Vaughan, Ontario
		Report	Bryan; Darren Chambers	Stadium: Warrior Field

June 23	York Region Shooters	1–2	FC Vorkuta	Vaughan, Ontario
	Reid 25'	Report	Volodymyr Rudyi 30'; Kristijan Kezic 84'	Stadium: St. Joan Of Arc Turf Field

July 2	Royal Toronto FC	0–3	York Region Shooters	Toronto, Ontario
		Report	Sotiris 45', 50'; Hassan Abdulumumini 80'	Stadium: Lamport Stadium

July 7	York Region Shooters	2–2	SC Waterloo	Vaughan, Ontario
	Evan Beutler 23', 90'	Report	Jure Glavina 44', 71'	Stadium: St. Joan Of Arc Turf Field

July 14	York Region Shooters	0–1	Scarborough SC	Vaughan, Ontario
		Report	Dimitrov 67'	Stadium: St. Joan Of Arc Turf Field

July 22	Brantford Galaxy	1–2	York Region Shooters	Brantford, Ontario
		Report	Evan Beutler 85'	Stadium: Steve Brown Sports Complex

July 30	Milton SC	1–7	York Region Shooters	Milton, Ontario
	Danny Jirta	Report	Alton Ellis,, Evan Butler; Bryan; Doryan Bothelo,	Stadium: Milton Community Park

August 5	FC Vorkuta	0–2	York Region Shooters	Toronto, Ontario
		Report	Hassan Abdulmumini 77'; Doryan Botelho 85'	Stadium: Esther Shiner Stadium

August 11	Serbian White Eagles	0–0	York Region Shooters	Toronto, Ontario
		Report		Stadium: Centennial Park Stadium; Attendance: 100

August 18	York Region Shooters	5–0	Royal Toronto FC	Vaughan, Ontario
	Edwards 4'; Bryan 27'; Evan Beutler 52', 64', 87'	Report		Stadium: St. Joan Of Arc Turf Field

August 25	York Region Shooters	1–0	Serbian White Eagles	Vaughan, Ontario
	Edwards 67'	Report		Stadium: St. Joan Of Arc Turf Field; Attendance: 100; Referee: E. Gustavo

== Statistics ==
=== Goals and assists ===
Correct as of November 10, 2017

First Division Goals
Pos.	Playing Pos.	Nation	Name	Appearances	Goals
1	FW	(United States)	Evan Beutler	14	7
2	FW	(Jamaica)	Kavin Bryan	12	5
3	MF	(Jamaica)	Camaal Reid	10	4
4	MF	(Canada)	Doryan Botelho	9	3
4	MF	(Canada)	Alton Ellis	12	3
4	MF	(Greece)	Theofanis Sotiris	5	3
7	MF	(Canada)	Hassan Abdulmumini	8	2
7	MF	(Canada)	Darren Chambers	7	2
7	MF	(Jamaica)	Richard Edwards	12	2
10	DF	(Ivory Coast)	Gerard Ladiyou	11	1
Total				104	34
