= 2016 Canadian Soccer League season =

Professional soccer league season

Canadian Soccer League First Division
- Season: 2016
- Dates: May 21 – October 9 (regular season); October 15 – October 30 (playoffs)
- Champions: York Region Shooters (First Division regular season); Serbian White Eagles (First Division playoffs, 2nd title)
- Matches: 84
- Goals: 269 (3.2 per match)
- Top goalscorer: Serhiy Ivlyev (15)
- Biggest home win: Serbian White Eagles 4-1 FC Ukraine United (June 17, 2016)
- Biggest away win: Milton SC 3-6 FC Ukraine United (October 9, 2016)

The 2016 Canadian Soccer League season (known as the Givova Canadian Soccer League for sponsorship reasons) was the 19th season under the Canadian Soccer League name. The first match of the season was played on May 21, 2016, and ended on October 30, 2016. The season concluded with the Serbian White Eagles claiming their second CSL Championship by defeating expansion franchise Hamilton City by a score of 2-1. In the Second Division, the York Region Shooters B defeated Toronto Atomic FC B 2-1. During the regular season, York Region claimed their fifth regular-season title and achieved a team milestone by recording their best defensive record allowing only 10 goals a record not matched since the Ottawa Wizards in the 2003 CPSL season. Meanwhile, SC Waterloo Region acquired their third Second Division regular-season title.

== Summary ==
York Region Shooters dominated the first division throughout the regular season as they held the top position for the majority of the season. In preparation for the season, York Region retained its core veterans with a notable domestic addition of Nicholas Lindsay, and talent from the Caribbean football market. The Shooters produced an eleven-match undefeated streak that lasted until August 14. They finished the regular season as First Division champions with 18 points above the runners-up. In the postseason York Region was eliminated in the second round to a penalty shootout.

The second position spot was contested between FC Ukraine United, Scarborough SC, Serbian White Eagles, and Toronto Atomic FC. Ukraine United was an expansion franchise with reputable credentials from the amateur level and was the closest competitor to York Region. United utilized the usage of imports from the Ukrainian football market in their player recruitment. The club made an impressive debut season and finished as the runners up in the division with the highest offensive record. In the playoffs, Ukraine United reached the semifinals.

The third position was clinched by Scarborough SC by a single point difference. The season cemented the eastern Toronto side as a contender within the division. Former player Ricardo Munguía Pérez was assigned head coach responsibilities and followed the league's standard in importing players. The roster was reliant on imports from the Bulgarian/Balkan football market with a notable domestic acquisition of Canadian international Adrian Cann. The fourth and fifth spots were taken by Serbian White Eagles and Toronto Atomic as only a difference in goal concessions separated the two Toronto clubs. Serbia continued its practice of attracting imports from the Serbian football market, while Atomic continued acquiring talent from Ukraine with a prominent domestic signing of Canadian international Terry Dunfield.

The remainder of the table was contested between Hamilton City, Brantford Galaxy, and Milton SC. After the relocation of London City to Hamilton the organization assembled a mixed roster of domestic veterans and European imports. The Steeltown side finished sixth in the standings and managed to reach the championship final against Serbia. Since the return of Brantford in 2015 the club relied on imports from the Balkans with a notable signing of Krum Bibishkov. The team secured the seventh spot with a two-point difference from Milton, which finished at the bottom of the division.

== First Division ==
=== Changes from 2015 ===
The 2016 season featured 14 teams in the two divisions with 8 in the First Division and 6 in the Second Division. The First Division was reduced to eight teams as Brampton United, Burlington SC, and Toronto Croatia departed from the league and became more involved at the developmental level with their academy teams participating in the Canadian Academy of Futbol (CAF). They would also field senior teams in the newly formed CAF Supergroup Open Division. Niagara United departed from the league after a controversial ending in their final match of the 2015 season. A new entry from the Ontario Soccer League known as FC Ukraine United was granted a CSL franchise.

London City's franchise rights were transferred to Hamilton to become Hamilton City. London City remained in the league as their territorial rights were kept by Milton owner Jasmin Halkic and relegated to the Second division. SC Waterloo Region was voluntarily relegated to the Second division. The CSL became associated once more with Givova with a sponsor agreement reached, which granted naming rights to the league, and the CSL Championship. The league re-launched its television program as the Givova CSL Primetime with Ethnic Channels Group, and BeIN Sports broadcasting the program. The CSL formed a partnership with the Ontario Youth Soccer Association to establish a youth division for the CSL academy teams. The league also finalized an agreement with the Canadian Corporate Soccer League to assist in developing a similar structure for Toronto's corporate clubs.

=== Teams ===
Team	City	Stadium	Manager
Brantford Galaxy	Brantford, Ontario	Steve Brown Sports Complex	Tomo Dančetović
Hamilton City	Hamilton, Ontario (Stoney Creek)	Cardinal Newman Secondary School	Josip Dzale
Milton SC	Milton, Ontario (Timberlea)	Jean Vanier Stadium	Amir Osmanlic
FC Ukraine United	Vaughan, Ontario (Maple)	Joan of Arc Turf Field	Andrei Malychenkov
Scarborough SC	Toronto, Ontario (Scarborough)	Birchmount Stadium	Ricardo Munguía Pérez
Serbian White Eagles	Toronto, Ontario (Etobicoke)	Centennial Park Stadium	Uroš Stamatović; Mirko Medić
Toronto Atomic FC	Toronto, Ontario (Etobicoke)	Centennial Park Stadium	Vasyl Ishchak
York Region Shooters	Vaughan, Ontario (Maple)	Joan of Arc Turf Field	Tony De Thomasis

Location of First Division teams outside of Toronto for the 2016 CSL season.
First Division
Location of First Division teams in Toronto for the 2016 CSL season.
First Division

=== Standings ===
Pos	Team	Pld	W	D	L	GF	GA	GD	Pts	Qualification
1	York Region Shooters (A, C)	21	16	3	2	40	10	+30	51	Qualification for Playoffs
2	FC Ukraine United (A)	21	9	6	6	45	38	+7	33	Qualification for Playoffs
3	Scarborough SC (A)	21	9	4	8	36	31	+5	31	Qualification for Playoffs
4	Serbian White Eagles (A, O)	21	9	3	9	33	27	+6	30	Qualification for Playoffs
5	Toronto Atomic FC (A)	21	8	6	7	36	37	−1	30	Qualification for Playoffs
6	Hamilton City (A)	21	6	5	10	31	38	−7	23	Qualification for Playoffs
7	Brantford Galaxy (A)	21	3	9	9	23	38	−15	18	Qualification for Playoffs
8	Milton SC (A)	21	4	4	13	25	50	−25	16	Qualification for Playoffs

Updated to match(es) played on October 9, 2016. Source: []
Rules for classification: 1) points; 2) goal difference; 3) number of goals scored.
(A) Advance to a further round; (C) Champions; (O) Play-off winners

=== Season statistics ===
==== Goals ====
Rank	Player	Club	Goals
1	(Ukraine) Serhiy Ivlyev	FC Ukraine United	15
2	(Jamaica) Richard West	York Region Shooters	13
3	(Bosnia and Herzegovina) Adnan Smajić	Milton SC	12
4	(Bosnia and Herzegovina) Adis Hasečić	Scarborough SC	11
5	(Ukraine) Kostyantyn Derevlyov	FC Ukraine United	9
5	(Canada) Milos Scepanovic	Serbian White Eagles	9
6	(Canada) Terry Dunfield	Toronto Atomic FC	8
6	(Serbia) Aleksandar Stojiljković	Scarborough SC	8
7	(Croatia) Zdenko Jurčević	Hamilton City	7
7	(North Macedonia) Aleksandar Stojanovski	York Region Shooters	7

==== Hat-tricks ====
Player	Club	Against	Result	Date
(Ukraine) Serhiy Ivlyev	FC Ukraine United	Milton SC	4–2 (H)	26 June 2016
(Bosnia and Herzegovina) Adis Hasečić	Scarborough SC	Hamilton City	4–2 (H)	17 September 2016
(Jamaica) Richard West	York Region Shooters	FC Ukraine United	3–0 (H)	18 September 2016
(Canada) Terry Dunfield	Toronto Atomic FC	Serbian White Eagles	4–3 (H)	5 October 2016
(Ukraine) Kostyantyn Derevlyov	FC Ukraine United	Milton SC	6–3 (A)	9 October 2016

=== Playoffs ===
==== Bracket ====
Due to a shortage of teams, all eight teams qualified for the one-game quarterfinal, and a one-game semifinal that led to the championship game played on October 30 at Birchmount Stadium in Toronto.

Quarterfinals
1	York Region Shooters	5
8	Milton SC	0
3	Scarborough SC	0
6	Hamilton City SC	3
4	Serbian White Eagles	1
5	Toronto Atomic FC	0
2	FC Ukraine United	3
7	Brantford Galaxy	0

Semifinals
1	York Region Shooters	1 (1)
6	Hamilton City SC	1 (3)
4	Serbian White Eagles	1
2	FC Ukraine United	0

Final
6	Hamilton City SC	1
4	Serbian White Eagles	2

==== Quarterfinals ====
October 15, 2016	Serbian White Eagles	1–0	Toronto Atomic FC	Toronto, Ontario
19:30	Milos Scepanovic 60'	Report		Stadium: Centennial Park Stadium

October 15, 2016	FC Ukraine United	3–0	Brantford Galaxy	Toronto, Ontario
16:00	Muzychuk 45'; Shutov 49'; Derevlov 80'	Report		Stadium: Esther Shiner Stadium

October 16, 2016	York Region Shooters	5–0	Milton SC	Maple, Ontario
18:30	Gerard Ladiyou 14'; Ainsley Deer 13'; Adur 17'; Tristan Frankson 23'; West 52'	Report		Stadium: Joan of Arc Turf Field

October 16, 2016	Scarborough SC	0–3	Hamilton City	Toronto, Ontario
19:30		Report	Timotej Zakrajsek 23'; Jurčević 31'; Frane Grbesa 78'	Stadium: Birchmount Stadium

==== Semifinals ====
October 23, 2016	FC Ukraine United	0-1	Serbian White Eagles	Toronto, Ontario
17:00		Report	Miroslav Jovanovic 71'	Stadium: Esther Shiner Stadium

October 23, 2016	York Region Shooters	1–1 (a.e.t.) (1–4 p)	Hamilton City SC	Maple, Ontario
18:30	David Guzman 76'	Report	Frane Grbesa 78'	Stadium: Joan of Arc Turf Field
	Penalties
	West (penalty scored); Herron (penalty missed); Schipper (penalty missed); Simpson (penalty missed)		Jurčević (penalty scored); James Nathan (penalty missed); Čabrilo (penalty scored); Arsen Platis (penalty missed); Krmar (penalty scored)

=== CSL Championship ===
October 30, 2016
14:00

Serbian White Eagles	2-1 (a.e.t.)	Hamilton City SC
Luka Bojić 59'; Milos Scepanovic 93'	Report	Domagoj Zubac 14'

Birchmount Stadium, Toronto, Ontario
Attendance: 400
Referee: Tony Amaral

GK	40	(Serbia) Goran Škarić
RB	6	(Serbia) Radenko Kamberović
CB	11	(Serbia) Branislav Vukomanović
CB	15	(Serbia) Milan Kušić	Substituted off
LB	4	(Serbia) Vitomir Jelić
RM	12	(Canada) Filip Velasevic
CM	18	(Serbia) Marko Marović
CM	7	(Serbia) Đorđe Jočić
LM	10	(Canada) Milos Scepanovic (c)
ST	9	(Serbia) Goran Švonja
ST	16	(Montenegro) Luka Bojić	Substituted off
Substitutes:
GK	27	(Serbia) Bojan Vranić
MF	3	(Serbia) Miloš Ljubenović	Substituted on
MF	14	(Serbia) Miroslav Jovanović	Substituted on
Manager:
(Serbia) Mirko Medić

GK	1	(Croatia) Adrian Bečić
RB	4	(Canada) Steven Lovell
CB	8	(Canada) Santiago Pestrepo
CB	22	(Serbia) Nikola Stanojević (c)	Substituted off
LB	21	(Canada) Arsen Platis
RM	14	(Serbia) Igor Krmar
CM	18	(Croatia) Dražen Vuković
CM	19	(Canada) Miroslav Čabrilo
CM	9	(Croatia) Frane Grbeša
LM	16	(Croatia) Zdenko Jurčević
FW	24	(Bosnia and Herzegovina) Domagoj Zubac	Substituted off
Substitutes:
GK	12	(Canada) Eric Lowell
DF	20	(Canada) Alejandro Uribe	Substituted on
FW	11	(Canada) Maksim Boskic	Substituted on
Manager:
(Croatia) Josip Džale

== Second Division ==
Canadian Soccer League Second Division
- Season: 2016
- Champions: SC Waterloo (Second Division regular season); York Region Shooters B (Second Division playoffs)
- Matches: 45
- Goals: 238 (5.29 per match)
- Top goalscorer: Mohammad-Ali Heydarpour (19)
- Biggest home win: TOR B 12-2 SER B
- Biggest away win: SER B 0-8 BRG B

=== Teams ===
Of the 10 teams that played in the Second Division in 2015, four returned. The number increased to six with the relegation of SC Waterloo, and London City which served as a reserve team for Milton SC. Hamilton City SC, FC Ukraine United, and Scarborough SC didn't operate a reserve team in the Second Division.

Team	City	Stadium	Manager
Brantford Galaxy B	Brantford, Ontario	Steve Brown Sports Complex	Tomo Dancetovic
London City	London, Ontario	Hellenic Centre Stadium	Cedo Popovic
SC Waterloo Region	Waterloo, Ontario	Warrior Field	Lazo Dzepina
Serbian White Eagles B	Toronto, Ontario	Centennial Park Stadium	Goran Bakoc
Toronto Atomic FC B	Toronto, Ontario	Centennial Park Stadium	Serhiy Konyushenko
York Region Shooters B	Vaughan, Ontario	Joan of Arc Turf Field	Eddy Carowel

Location of Second Division teams for the 2016 CSL season.

=== Standings ===
Pos	Team	Pld	W	D	L	GF	GA	GD	Pts	Qualification
1	SC Waterloo Region (A, C)	14	9	2	3	56	25	+31	29	Qualification for Playoffs
2	Toronto Atomic FC B (A)	15	9	2	4	56	28	+28	29	Qualification for Playoffs
3	Brantford Galaxy B (A)	14	8	2	4	44	30	+14	26	Qualification for Playoffs
4	York Region Shooters B (A, O)	15	5	3	7	32	34	−2	18	Qualification for Playoffs
5	London City (A)	13	4	1	8	31	45	−14	13	Qualification for Playoffs
6	Serbian White Eagles B (A)	13	2	0	11	19	76	−57	6	Qualification for Playoffs

Updated to match(es) played on October 9, 2016. Source: canadiansoccerleague.ca
Rules for classification: 1) points; 2) goal difference; 3) number of goals scored.
(A) Advance to a further round; (C) Champions; (O) Play-off winners

=== Top Goal Scorers ===
Rank	Player	Club	Goals
1	(Iran) Mohammad-Ali Heydarpour	SC Waterloo Region	19
2	Brandon Barbosa	London City SC	13
3	Alexander Tighana Thompson	Toronto Atomic B	13
4	Kareem Hassanien	Brantford Galaxy B	11
5	Carlos Gunner Tijborenko	York Region Shooters B	9
6	Pat Wilson	Brantford Galaxy B	9
7	(Canada) Nikola Miokovic	SC Waterloo Region	8
8	Thomas Sackor	SC Waterloo Region	7
9	Stefan Brisevac	SC Waterloo Region	5
10	Michael Fayehum	Toronto Atomic B	5

=== Playoffs ===
==== Quarterfinals ====
October 9, 2016	Brantford Galaxy B	3-2	Serbian White Eagles B	Brantford, Ontario
13:30	Pat Wilson 27', 40'; Rade Parenta 90'	Report	Zarko Tomic 30', 68'	Stadium: Kiwanis Field

October 9, 2016	York Region Shooters B	1-0	London City	Maple, Ontario
16:00	Ricardo Miguel Lonseca 70'	Report		Stadium: Joan of Arc Turf Field

==== Semifinals ====
October 16, 2016	SC Waterloo Region	0-1	York Region Shooters B	Waterloo, Ontario
18:00		Report	Simon Petersen 12'	Stadium: Woodside Park

October 16, 2016	Toronto Atomic B	2-0	Brantford Galaxy B	Toronto, Ontario
18:00	Johnson Luyiga 20'; Michael Fayehun 90'	Report		Stadium: Centennial Park Stadium

==== Second Division Championship ====
October 22, 2016	York Region Shooters B	2-1	Toronto Atomic B	Toronto, Ontario
15:00	Abakar Mahamat 75', 106'	Report	Hassan Abdulmumini 54'	Stadium: Esther Shiner Stadium; Referee: Mike Bradley
