= Đorđe Vukobrat =

Serbian footballer

Personal information
- Date of birth: 5 May 1984 (age 42)
- Place of birth: Novi Sad, SR Serbia, SFR Yugoslavia
- Height: 1.85 m (6 ft 1 in)
- Position: Centre-back

Youth career
- ČSK Čortanovci

Senior career*
Years	Team	Apps	(Gls)
2002–2003	Inđija	12	(0)
2004–2008	Srem	74	(2)
2007–2008	→ Polet Novi Karlovci (loan)		
2008–2009	Hajduk Beška		
2009	→ Big Bull Bačinci (loan)	11	(1)
2009–2010	Big Bull Bačinci	24	(1)
2010–2011	Radnički Šid	32	(1)
2011–2013	Donji Srem	51	(5)
2013–2014	Al-Nasr		
2015	Donji Srem	14	(0)
2015–2016	Radnički Sremska Mitrovica	15	(2)
2016–2018	United Victory	35	(2)
2019–2021	Hamilton City		
2021–2022	BGH City		
2023–2024	Hamilton City		
- * Club domestic league appearances and goals

Đorđe Vukobrat (Serbian Cyrillic: Ђорђе Вукобрат; born 5 May 1984) is a Serbian former professional footballer who played as centre-back.

== Career ==
=== Early career ===
Vukobrat began playing at the local regional levels with various teams such as Dača Dimitrijević and CSK Čortanovci. In 2002, he joined the professional ranks to play in the Serbian League Vojvodina for a season with FK Inđija. In the next season, he transitioned into a higher tier in the First League of Serbia and Montenegro with FK Srem and had a loan spell with FK Polet Novi Karlovci. He would ultimately sign a permanent deal with Big Bull Bačinci in 2009 in the third division. The following season, Bačinci was promoted to the second tier, where Vukobrat appeared in 32 matches and scored 1 goal.

=== Donji Srem ===
After a season with Bačinci, he returned to Donji Srem in 2011 and helped the club win the Serbian League Vojvodina. In his second stint with Srem, he assisted the club in securing promotion to the Serbian SuperLiga. Throughout the season, he played in 28 matches and recorded 2 goals. He would re-sign with Srem during their run in the country's top tier. In his debut season in the top division, he played in 23 games and recorded 1 goal.

In 2013, he played abroad in the Oman Professional League with Al-Nasr SC. After a season in the Middle East, he returned to the Serbian premier league with his former club Srem for the 2014-15 season. In his return to the top division, he played in 14 matches. Vukobrat would continue playing in Serbia in the lower leagues with Radnički Sremska Mitrovica throughout the 2015-16 season.

=== Asia ===
In the summer of 2016, he had another stint abroad, this time in the Southeast Asian Dhivehi Premier League with United Victory. He played for United Victory the following season in the regional Malé League.

=== Canada ===
After several seasons in the Maldives, he ventured abroad to play in the Canadian Soccer League with Hamilton City. In his debut season with Hamilton, he helped the club secure a playoff berth by finishing sixth in the league's first division. The club would face FC Ukraine United in the opening round of the postseason, where Hamilton was eliminated from the competition. He re-signed with Hamilton for the 2020 season.

After the merger between Hamilton and Brantford Galaxy, he played with BGH City FC for the 2021 season. Vukobrat returned for his second season with the hybrid team in 2022. Throughout the 2022 campaign, the club secured a playoff berth by finishing sixth in the standings. The team was defeated in the quarterfinal round of the postseason by Scarborough SC. In 2023, he returned to his former club Hamilton as it became a single entity once again.

== Honors ==
Donji Srem

- Serbian League Vojvodina: 2010–11
