= Saša Vidović =

Bosnian Serb footballer and manager

Personal information
- Date of birth: 14 June 1982 (age 44)
- Place of birth: Banja Luka, SFR Yugoslavia
- Height: 1.79 m (5 ft 10 in)
- Position: Right midfielder

Youth career
- FC Blau-Weiß Feldkirch

Senior career*
Years	Team	Apps	(Gls)
2001–2003	Srem Jakovo		
2003–2004	Mladost Lukićevo	17	(4)
2003–2007	Zemun	80	(4)
2007–2010	Rad	48	(2)
2010–2011	Zemun	5	(1)
2011	Brantford Galaxy	3	(1)
2012	Timok	5	(1)
2012	Novi Sad	1	(0)
2015–2020	Brantford Galaxy		
2021–2022	BGH City		

Managerial career
- 2020: Brantford Galaxy
- * Club domestic league appearances and goals

Saša Vidović (Serbian Cyrillic: Саша Видовић, born 14 February 1982) is a Bosnian Serb former footballer who played as a midfielder.

== Club career ==
=== Early career ===
Vidović was born in Banja Luka, SR Bosnia and Herzegovina, during his early career, he played in the Austrian regional circuit with FC Blau-Weiß Feldkirch. He also had several stints with minor Serbian clubs such as Srem Jakovo and FK Mladost Lukićevo.

=== Serbia ===
In January 2004, Vidović returned to Serbia to play in the Serbian top league with Zemun. He was re-signed by the club the following season. His final season with Zemun was the 2006–07 season. After the relegation of Zemun in 2007, he signed with Rad originally in the Serbian second division. The Belgrade-based club secured a promotion to the top-tier league and re-signed Vidović. His final season in the Serbian top league was during the 2009–10 season with Rad. He appeared in seven matches throughout the season.

In the summer of 2010, after three seasons with Belgrade's Rad, he returned to his former club Zemun in the second division. In his single season with Zemun, he played in four matches and scored one goal.

=== Canada ===
In the summer of 2011, he signed with Canadian Soccer League club Brantford Galaxy. He recorded his first on July 1, 2011, against SC Toronto. Brantford failed to secure a playoff berth after finishing ninth in the league's first division.

=== Europe ===
He returned to Serbia the following winter by joining FK Timok in the Serbian League East. At the end of the season, they won promotion from the Serbian First League, but during the summer, he moved to Novi Sad, another club in the second division. In his debut season with Nov Sad, he appeared in nine matches and recorded one goal. In the winter of 2013, he ventured abroad again and joined the Croatian-side Bratstvo Savska Ves.

=== Return to Canada ===
In 2015, he returned to the Canadian circuit to his former club, Brantford, to compete in the 2015 season. He recorded his first goal of the season on June 8, 2015, against Toronto Atomic. The team failed again to secure a postseason berth by finishing eleventh in the division.

He re-signed with Brantford the following season. Vidović helped the club secure a playoff berth by finishing seventh in the top division. Brantford was eliminated from the playoff competition in the first round by Ukraine United. The 2017 season marked his fourth overall season with the Brantford organization. Throughout the campaign, he aided the club in securing another postseason berth for the second consecutive year. Their playoff journey concluded in the preliminary round after a defeat by Scarborough SC.

Brantford re-signed Vidović for the 2018 season. The club had another playoff-producing season by securing the final playoff berth in the division. Ukraine United eliminated the team in the first round of the postseason. In 2020, he began the transition to the managerial side by being named the head coach for Brantford.

After the merger between Hamilton and Brantford, he played with BGH City FC for the 2021 season. He had another season with the hybrid team the following season.

== Managerial career ==
In 2020, he served as the head coach for Brantford Galaxy in the Canadian Soccer League. For the second consecutive season, Brantford Galaxy finished at the bottom of the standings and avoided a winless season by winning their final match. Vidović joined the Hamilton City coaching staff for the 2023 season when the organization became a single entity once more.
