= Tihomir Kosturkov =

Bulgarian footballer

Personal information
- Date of birth: 24 March 1988 (age 38)
- Place of birth: Blagoevgrad, Bulgaria
- Position: Midfielder

Senior career*
Years	Team	Apps	(Gls)
2009–2010	Septemvri Simitli	6	(0)
2010–2011	Chavdar Byala Slatina	7	(0)
2010–2015	Septemvri Simitli	48	(5)
2015–2017	Scarborough SC	50	(15)
2018–2019	Septemvri Simitli		
2020–2022	Pirin Blagoevgrad II		
- * Club domestic league appearances and goals

Tihomir Kosturkov (born March 24, 1988) is a Bulgarian former footballer who played as a midfielder.

== Club career ==
=== Early career ===
Kosturkov began his youth career with the Pirin Blagoevgrad youth team. In 2009, he joined the professional ranks by signing with Septemvri Simitli in the Vtora liga. After a season with Septemvri, he signed with league rivals Chavdar Byala Slatina. His tenure with Chavdar was short-lived as he returned to Septemvri during the 2011 winter transfer market. Kosturkov participated in the 2011–12 Bulgarian Cup, where Septemvri reached the semifinals. Throughout the tournament, the club defeated CSKA Sofia in the quarterfinals and was eliminated by Ludogorets Razgrad.

=== Canada ===
In the summer of 2015, he played abroad in the Canadian Soccer League with Scarborough SC. Kosturkov re-signed with Scarborough for the 2016 season. In his second season in the Canadian circuit, he helped the club secure a playoff berth by finishing third in the league's first division. Scarborough was eliminated in the first round of the playoffs by Hamilton City. Kosturkov returned for the 2017 season and was named the team's captain. In his final season with Scarborough, he helped the club secure a playoff berth. In the preliminary round of the playoffs, Scarborough defeated Brantford Galaxy. In the next round, the club eliminated FC Vorkuta to advance to the championship final. Scarborough was defeated in the championship match in a penalty shootout against the York Region Shooters.

=== Bulgaria ===
After three seasons in Canada, he returned to Bulgaria, where he received a trial with Pirin Blagoevgrad. Ultimately, he returned to his former club, Septemvri Simitli, in 2018. In 2020, he played with Pirin Blagoevgrad's reserve team.

== Managerial career ==
In 2021, he was named the youth coach for Septemvri Simitli. Kosturkov served as an assistant coach for Septemvri Simitli under the manager Spas Stoimenov in 2025.

== Honours ==
Scarborough SC

- CSL Championship runner-up: 2017
