= Ricardo Munguía =

Ricardo Munguía may refer to:

- Ricardo Munguía Padilla (1944–2007), Mexican footballer
- Ricardo Munguía Pérez (born 1975), Mexican footballer
