= Domagoj Zubac =

Bosnian footballer (1990–2018)

Personal information
- Date of birth: 26 January 1990
- Place of birth: Čapljina, SFR Yugoslavia
- Date of death: 25 June 2018 (aged 28)
- Place of death: Čapljina, Bosnia and Herzegovina
- Position: Midfielder

Senior career*
Years	Team	Apps	(Gls)
2008–2010	Čapljina	1	(1)
2010–2011	Neretva	11	(0)
2012–2014	Čapljina	17	(2)
2014	Burlington SC		
2016	Hamilton City		
2017–2018	Čapljina		
- * Club domestic league appearances and goals

Domagoj Zubac (January 26, 1990 – June 25, 2018) was a Bosnian Croat footballer who played as a midfielder.

== Club career ==
=== Early career ===
Zubac began his career with his native club HNK Čapljina in the First League of Bosnia and Herzegovina during the 2008–09 season. In 2010, he played abroad in the Croatian 3. HNL with Neretva. In his debut season in the Croatian circuit, he appeared in 11 matches. After a season in Croatia, he returned to his former club Čapljina for the 2012–13 season. Zubac would participate in the 2012–13 Bosnia Cup where Čapljina initially defeated premier league side Borac Banja Luka. He also had an unsuccessful trial session with Czech side Písek in the winter of 2013.

In 2015, he played with Čapljina's mini-football team. He returned to Croatia for the 2015–16 season to play in the country's mini-football league with MNK Metkovic. In total, he appeared in 7 matches and scored 4 goals for Metkovic.

=== Canada ===
In the summer of 2014, he ventured out abroad once more this time to play in the Canadian Soccer League with Burlington SC. Burlington would qualify for the playoffs and were eliminated in the opening round by the North York Astros.

For the 2016 season, he signed with league rivals Hamilton City. In his debut season in the Canadian circuit, he helped Hamilton secure a playoff berth by finishing sixth in the league's first division. Hamilton would defeat Scarborough SC in the quarterfinal round of the postseason. In the semifinal stage, Hamilton would advance to the championship final after defeating divisional champions York Region Shooters in a penalty shootout. Zubac appeared in the championship match where he contributed a goal against the Serbian White Eagles however, the Serbs managed to defeat Hamilton in extra time.

=== Bosnia ===
In 2017, he returned to his former club Čapljina in the Bosnian second division.

== Death ==
On June 25, 2018, he died from severe injuries that he sustained in a motor accident several days earlier. His former club HNK Čapljina honored his memory with a mural painted on the club's stadium wall. The junior team would also pay tribute to his memory.

== Honors ==
Hamilton City

- CSL Championship runner–up: 2016
