= Metodi Iliev =

Bulgarian footballer (born 1983)

Personal information
- Date of birth: 7 January 1983 (age 43)
- Place of birth: Brezhani, Bulgaria
- Position: Defender

Senior career*
Years	Team	Apps	(Gls)
2006–2007	Pirin Razlog		
2007–2008	Pirin Blagoevgrad	0	(0)
2009–2016	Septemvri Simitli	75	(1)
2016	Scarborough SC		
2016–2020	Septemvri Simitli		
- * Club domestic league appearances and goals

Metodi Iliev (born January 7, 1983) is a Bulgarian former footballer who played as a defender.

== Club career ==
=== Early career ===
Iliev began his career with Pirin Razlog in 2006. The following season, he signed with Pirin Blagoevgrad in the Bulgarian A Group. In 2009, he signed for Septemvri Simitli in the Vtora liga. Iliev participated in the 2011–12 Bulgarian Cup, where Septemvri reached the semifinals. Throughout the tournament, the club defeated CSKA Sofia in the quarterfinals and was eliminated by Ludogorets Razgrad.

=== Canada ===
In the summer of 2016, he played abroad in the Canadian Soccer League with Scarborough SC. In his debut season in the Canadian circuit, he helped the club secure a playoff berth by finishing third in the league's first division. Scarborough was eliminated in the first round of the playoffs by Hamilton City.

=== Bulgaria ===
After a season abroad, he returned to his former club Septemvri Simitli in the fall of 2016. In 2017, he joined the managerial staff by becoming a player assistant coach. In 2020, he retired from competitive football to become the permanent assistant coach for Kostadin Katsimerski.

== Managerial career ==
Iliev transitioned to the managerial side in 2017 as a player-coach for Septemvri Simitli. He became an assistant for Septemvri in 2020 under Kostadin Katsimerski. In 2022, continued in his capacity as assistant coach for Septemvri when Stefan Goshev was appointed. In 2025, he became a youth coach for Septemvri Simitli.
