= Haris Redžepi =

Bosnian footballer

Personal information
- Date of birth: 20 July 1988 (age 38)
- Place of birth: Sarajevo, SFR Yugoslavia
- Height: 1.88 m (6 ft 2 in)
- Position: Forward

Senior career*
| Years | Team | Apps | (Gls) |
| 2006–2009 | Željezničar Sarajevo | 35 | (3) |
| 2009–2010 | Karlovac | 14 | (1) |
| 2010–2011 | Travnik | 9 | (0) |
| 2011 | Košice | 2 | (0) |
| 2012 | Travnik | 37 | (3) |
| 2013 | Novi Pazar | 9 | (0) |
| 2014 | Sloboda Tuzla | 14 | (8) |
| 2014–2015 | Olimpic Sarajevo | 0 | (0) |
| 2014–2015 | FK Goražde | | |
| 2015–2018 | Brantford Galaxy | 21 | (4) |
| 2019–2020 | Hamilton City SC | | |
| 2021 | BGH City FC | | |
- * Club domestic league appearances and goals

Haris Redžepi (born 20 July 1988) is a Bosnian-Herzegovinian former professional footballer who played as a forward.

== Playing career ==
Born in Sarajevo, SR Bosnia and Herzegovina, SFR Yugoslavia, he played with FK Željezničar Sarajevo between 2006 till 2009 in the Premier League of Bosnia and Herzegovina. In summer 2009, he moved to NK Karlovac and played with them in the 2009–10 Prva HNL. In summer 2010, he returned to Bosnia and joined NK Travnik for the next two and a half years. Between his two tenures with Travnik he had a short spell with MFK Košice in the Slovak Corgoň Liga in the 2011–12 season. During the winter break of the 2012–13 season he moved to Serbia and joined the SuperLiga side FK Novi Pazar.

A year later he returned to Bosnia to play with FK Sloboda Tuzla. The sixth of August 2014 he left Sloboda and joined Olimpic Sarajevo. Shortly after he signed with FK Goražde in the First League of the Federation of Bosnia and Herzegovina. In 2015, he went abroad once more to play in the Canadian Soccer League with Brantford Galaxy. In 2019, he signed with Hamilton City SC for the 2019 CSL season.

After the merger between Hamilton with Brantford Galaxy he played with BGH City FC for the 2021 season.

== Managerial career ==
In 2016, he served as an assistant coach for two seasons with Brantford Galaxy. In 2019, he became associated with ProStars FC as an academy coach.
