= Dejan Ristić =

Dejan Ristić may refer to:

- Dejan Ristić (footballer)
- Dejan Ristić (historian)
