= Roglić =

Roglić (Serbian Cyrillic: Роглић) is a Serbo-Croatian surname. Roglič is a Slovenian surname. Notable people with the surname include:

- Iva Roglić (born 1988), Serbian basketballer
- Primož Roglič (born 1989), Slovenian professional racing cyclist
- Zoran Roglić (born 1976), Croatian footballer
