= Aleksa Marković (Canadian soccer) =

Canadian soccer player

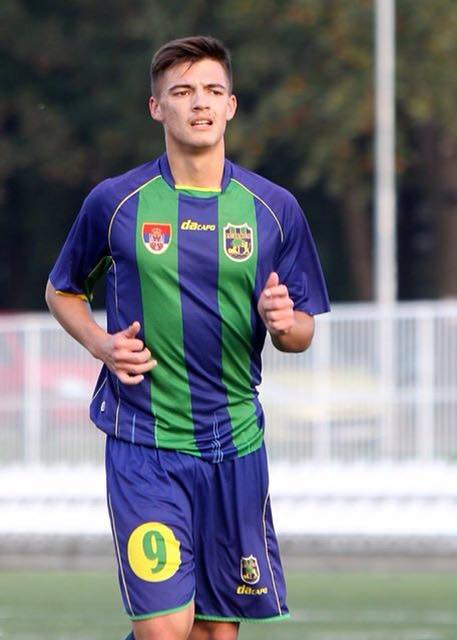
- Marković with Zemun in 2016

Personal information
- Date of birth: 27 February 1997 (age 29)
- Place of birth: Hamilton, Ontario, Canada
- Height: 1.84 m (6 ft 0 in)
- Positions: Midfielder; forward

Team information
- Current team: BGHC 1

College career
Years	Team	Apps	(Gls)
2021	Mohawk Mountaineers	4	(0)

Senior career*
Years	Team	Apps	(Gls)
2015	Brantford Galaxy	8	(1)
2015–2018	Zemun	20	(0)
2016	→ Radnički Beograd (loan)	2	(0)
2017	→ Brodarac 1947 (loan)	12	(1)
2017	→ Inđija (loan)	0	(0)
2019	Alliance United FC	5	(0)
2019	Türkspor Augsburg	9	(4)
2020	Brantford Galaxy		
2020–2021	Zvijezda 09	1	(0)
2021–	BGHC 1		
- * Club domestic league appearances and goals as of 29 December 2021

Aleksa Marković (born 27 February 1997) is a Canadian soccer player playing with Canadian Soccer League club BGHC 1.

== Club career ==
Born in Hamilton, Ontario, Markovic began playing in 2015 with Brantford Galaxy in the Canadian Soccer League. He later started playing with FK Zemun debuting as senior with one appearance in the 2015–16 Serbian First League. Next season he spent on loans, first half at FK Radnički Beograd playing in the Serbian League Belgrade, and second half with FK Brodarac 1947 playing in same league. In summer 2017, he was registered for his club, Zemun, which had just had been promoted to the Serbian SuperLiga, and he made his debut in the Serbian highest rank on 5 August 2017, in a game against FK Radnički Niš.

In 2019, he played with Alliance United in League1 Ontario. Later that year, he played in the Bayernliga Süd with Türkspor Augsburg. He returned to his former club Brantford Galaxy for the 2020 season. In late 2020, he signed with FK Zvijezda 09 of the First League of the Republika Srpska, and made his debut on 11 October 2020, against FK Tekstilac Derventa. After the merger between Hamilton City, and Brantford Galaxy he played with BGH City FC for the 2021 CSL season. In late 2021, he played at the college level with Mohawk College.

== International career ==
Markovic was part of Canada men's national under-20 soccer team camp in January 2017 in Toronto.
