= Mladen Kukrika =

Bosnian professional football goalkeeper (born 1991)

Personal information
- Full name: Mladen Kukrika
- Date of birth: 11 January 1991 (age 35)
- Place of birth: Trebinje, SFR Yugoslavia
- Height: 1.86 m (6 ft 1 in)
- Position: Goalkeeper

Youth career
- –2010: Leotar

Senior career*
| Years | Team | Apps | (Gls) |
| 2010–2013 | Leotar | 29 | (0) |
| 2014 | Kastrioti | 10 | (0) |
| 2014–2015 | Leotar | | |
| 2015–2016 | Scarborough SC | | |
| 2016–2017 | Željezničar Banja Luka | 15 | (0) |
| 2018–2019 | Metalleghe-BSI | 27 | (0) |
| 2019 | Prespa Birlik | 3 | (0) |
| 2020 | Borac Banja Luka | 2 | (0) |
| 2020–2021 | GOŠK Gabela | 7 | (0) |
| 2021–2022 | Victoria Wanderers | 14 | (0) |
- * Club domestic league appearances and goals

Mladen Kukrika (born 11 January 1991) is a Bosnian professional football goalkeeper.

== Club career ==
=== Early career ===
Kukrika began his career in his country's premier league with Leotar in the 2009–10 season. In his debut season, he appeared in 2 matches. He resigned with Leotar the following season. He would establish himself as the starting goalkeeper in his fifth season with the club. Throughout the 2013-14 campaign, he appeared in 18 matches.

Kukrika would be transferred during the winter 2014 transfer market to the Albanian First Division with Kastrioti. His tenure with the club was short-lived as he departed after the season's conclusion. He played in 10 matches in the Albanian circuit. In the summer of 2014, he returned to his former club Leotar which competed in the country's second division. Throughout the season, Kukrika would also receive a trial with Zvijezda Gradačac but failed to secure a contract.

=== Canada ===
In 2015, he played abroad in the Canadian Soccer League's first division with expansion side Scarborough SC. He played in the club's home opener on May 15, 2015, against Toronto Croatia. Kukrika re-signed with Scarborough the following season. He would help the eastern Toronto side clinch a playoff berth by finishing third in the division. Scarborough was eliminated from the postseason tournament by Hamilton City in the first round.

=== Europe ===
After his stint in Canada, he returned to the Bosnian circuit and secured a deal with Željezničar Banja Luka. In his debut season with Željezničar, he helped the club secure a promotion by winning the league title. He left the club and became a free agent at the season's conclusion. However, his departure was short as he re-signed with the club.

He joined NK Metalleghe-BSI during the 2018 winter transfer market.

Ahead of the 2019–20 season, Kukrika joined Swedish Prespa Birlik in the Division 2 Västra Götaland. In January 2020, he returned to the Bosnian top-tier league by signing with Borac Banja Luka. Kukrika left Borac on 22 August 2020 after the termination of his contract. In his final season in the Bosnian premier league, he played in 2 matches.

On 12 October 2020, he signed a one-year contract with First League of FBiH club GOŠK Gabela. He made his official debut for GOŠK five days later, on 17 October, in a league win against Slaven Živinice.

In 2021, he played in the Gozo Football League First Division with Victoria Wanderers F.C. After the conclusion of the season, the club was relegated from the top division.

== Honours ==
Željezničar Banja Luka

- Second League of the Republika Srpska: 2016–17 (west)
