= Zdenko Jurčević =

Croatian footballer

Personal information
- Full name: Zdenko Jurčević
- Date of birth: 2 December 1985 (age 40)
- Place of birth: Duvno, SFR Yugoslavia
- Position: Midfielder

Senior career*
Years	Team	Apps	(Gls)
2007–2008	Habenhauser FV		
2007–2008	1. Simmeringer	9	(1)
2010–2011	Konavljanin	33	(2)
2011–2012	Vitez		
2012–2013	Tomislav		
2012–2013	Čapljina	12	(8)
2013–2014	Istra 1961	0	(0)
2013–2015	Čapljina	46	(26)
2015	Brantford Galaxy	23	(21)
2015–2016	Metalleghe-BSI		
2016	Hamilton City	19	(7)
2016–2017	Neretva	8	(3)
2017–2018	Jadran Luka Ploče	14	(9)
2017–2018	Neretva	2	(0)
- * Club domestic league appearances and goals

Zdenko Jurčević (born December 2, 1985) is a former Croatian footballer who played as a midfielder.

== Club career ==
=== Early career ===
Jurčević received his football training at the youth level with his local club HNK Tomislav and later with Hajduk Split. He would venture abroad to play professionally career with Habenhauser FV of the Bremen-Liga in 2007. He played the remainder of the 2007-08 season at the Austrian regional level with 1. Simmeringer SC.

After several seasons abroad, he began playing in the Croatian Treća HNL with NK Konavljanin in 2010. In 2011, he returned to the Bosnian circuit to sign with NK Vitez. Following his brief stint wit Vitez, he returned to his former club HNK Tomislav but failed to report to training camp. Instead, Jurčević landed a contract with Čapljina during the 2013 winter transfer market. In his debut season with Čapljina, he played in 12 matches and recorded 8 goals.

After a season with Čapljina, he signed a contract with Istra 1961 for two years in the Croatian First Football League. His time in the Croatian top tier was short-lived as he left the club after a month. After his release from Istra, he returned to Čapljina. Jurčević re-signed with the club for the 2014-15 season. He would finish the campaign, as the league's second-highest goal scorer with 16 goals.

=== Canada ===
Jurčević went overseas in 2015 to play in the Canadian Soccer League with the Brantford Galaxy. He would record his first goal for the club on May 25, 2015, against Niagara United. In his debut season in the Canadian circuit, he finished as the club's top goal scorer with 21 goals.

The following season he signed with Hamilton City. Jurčević helped Hamilton secure a playoff berth in the league's first division. In the opening round of the postseason, he contributed a goal against Scarborough SC which helped the team advance to the next round. Hamilton would reach the championship finals after defeating the York Region Shooters in a penalty shootout. Their final opponents were the Serbian White Eagles where the Serbs defeated Hamilton for the championship title.

=== Europe ===
After the conclusion of the Canadian season, Jurčević returned to the Bosnian second division with NK Metalleghe-BSI during the fall of 2015. In 2017, he returned to the Croatian circuit and played with NK Neretva. Jurčević played in 8 matches and recorded 3 goals for Neretva. The next season, he signed with league rivals NK Jadran Luka Ploče. Jurčević tenure with Jadran Luka was short-lived as he left the club in the early winter of 2018. He would finish the remainder of the season with his former club Neretva.

== Honors ==
Hamilton City

- CSL Championship runner–up: 2016
