= Dragan Antanasijević =

Serbian footballer

Personal information
- Full name: Dragan Antanasijević
- Date of birth: 19 July 1987 (age 39)
- Place of birth: Belgrade, SFR Yugoslavia
- Height: 1.87 m (6 ft 2 in)
- Position: Defensive midfielder

Team information
- Current team: BGHC 1

Senior career*
Years	Team	Apps	(Gls)
2005–2008	Radnički Beograd	64	(1)
2008–2009	BSK Borča	1	(0)
2009	→ Palilulac Beograd (loan)	13	(0)
2009	BASK	10	(1)
2010	Kaposvár	5	(0)
2010–2011	BASK	32	(1)
2011–2013	Banat Zrenjanin	60	(0)
2013	Sloga Petrovac	14	(0)
2014	Partizani Tirana	17	(0)
2014–2016	Sloga Petrovac	54	(0)
2016–2018	Tarbes	34	(0)
2018–2020	Trélissac	20	(0)
2021–2022	BGHC 1		
2023–	Hamilton City		
- * Club domestic league appearances and goals as of 5 March 2022

Dragan Antanasijević (Serbian Cyrillic: Драган Антанасијевић; born 19 July 1987) is a Serbian professional footballer who plays as a defensive midfielder for Canadian Soccer League club Hamilton City.

== Club career ==
=== Hungary ===
In 2010, he played abroad in Hungary's Nemzeti Bajnokság with Kaposvári Rákóczi.

=== BASK ===
During his tenure with BASK, he was offered a contract from the Maltese side Valletta F.C. in the 2012 winter transfer market. He ultimately landed a trial run with Valletta.

=== Albania ===
In the winter of 2014, he played in Albania's Kategoria Superiore with Partizani Tirana, marking his second run abroad. In total, he would play in 17 matches. It was announced that he extended his deal with Tirana in May 2014. However, shortly after the contract was mutually terminated by both parties in the summer of 2014.

=== France ===
Antanasijević went abroad in 2016 to play in the French fourth-tier league with Tarbes Pyrénées. In his debut season in France, he played in 19 matches. He re-signed with Tarbes for the following season. In his second season with Tarbes, he appeared in 15 matches.

Following his departure from Tarbes, he remained in France the next season by signing with Trélissac FC. In his debut season with the club, he appeared in 29 league matches. He played in the 2019–20 Coupe de France, where he participated in the match against Marseille, where the result was determined in a penalty shootout.

After the conclusion of the 2019-20 season, he departed from Trélissac.

=== Canada ===
After his stint in France, he secured a deal with BGHC 1 in the Canadian Soccer League. In 2023, he continued playing in the CSL by signing with Hamilton City.

== Honours ==
BASK

- Serbian First League: 2010–11
