= Odain Simpson =

Jamaican footballer (born 1987)

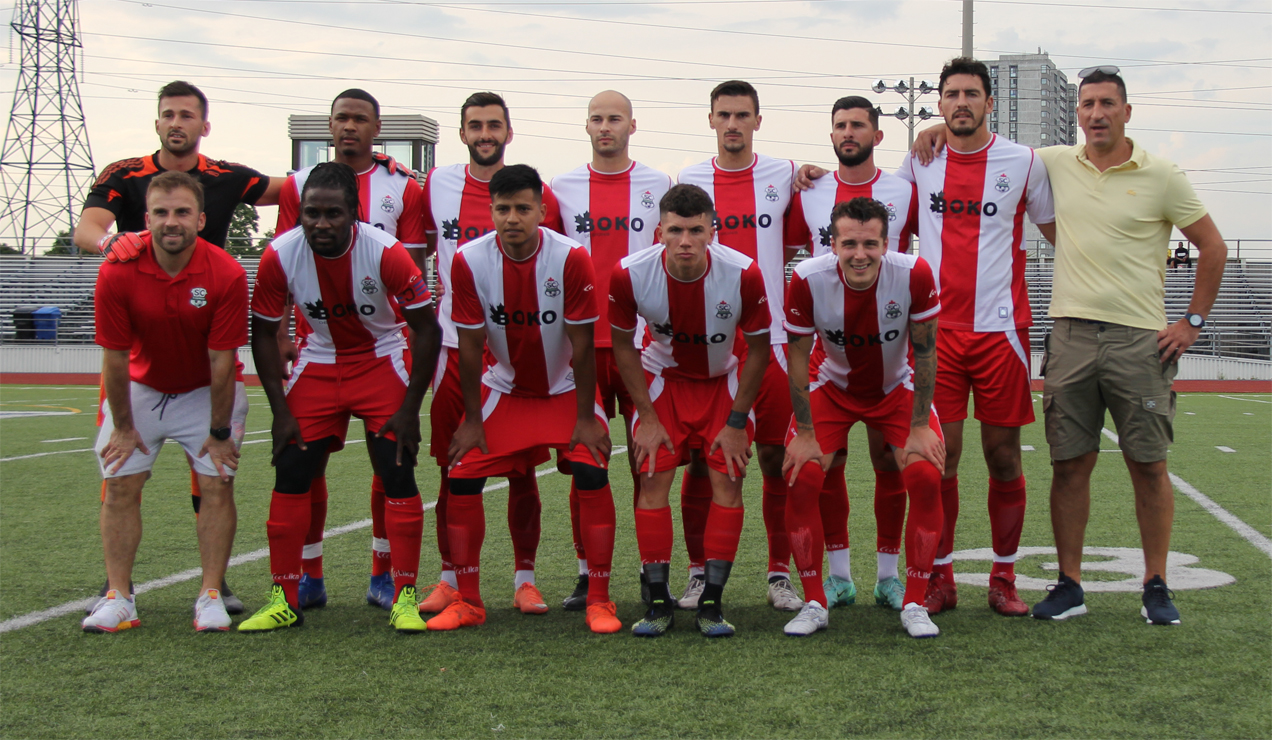
- Simpson in 2022

Personal information
- Full name: Odain Omaro Simpson
- Date of birth: 6 October 1987 (age 39)
- Place of birth: Kingston, Jamaica
- Position: Defender

Senior career*
Years	Team	Apps	(Gls)
2003–2009	Waterhouse	150	(5)
2009–2010	August Town	25	(2)
2010–2011	Waterhouse	35	(1)
2011–2012	Arnett Gardens	35	
2012	Cavalier	20	(2)
2012–2013	Arnett Gardens	37	
2014	Kingston FC	30	(1)
2014–2015	Arnett Gardens	8	
2015–2016	York Region Shooters	28	(2)
2016–2017	Arnett Gardens	3	
2017–2018	York Region Shooters	28	(1)
2018–2023	Scarborough SC	120	(6)
- * Club domestic league appearances and goals

Odain Simpson (born October 6, 1987) is a Jamaican footballer who plays as a defender.

== Club career ==
=== Jamaica ===
Simpson played in the Jamaican National Premier League, under 20 and under 21 in 2003-2010 with Waterhouse FC then he left in 2010 to sign with August Town. In 2011, he was resigned by league rivals Waterhouse. After a season with Waterhouse, he secured a deal with league powerhouse Arnett Gardens. His tenure with Arnett was short-lived as he was transferred to Cavalier F.C. in the winter transfer market.

His final stint in the Jamaican national circuit occurred during the 2016–17 season when he returned to his former club Arnett Gardens on his off season to help them secure the National Premier League title.

=== Kingston ===
Simpson would play abroad during the summer of 2014 in the Canadian Soccer League with Kingston FC. In his debut season in the Canadian circuit, he helped Kingston secure a playoff berth by finishing third in the league's first division. Kingston advanced to the semifinal round defeating the Serbian White Eagles in the first round. Their playoff journey would conclude in the following round after a defeat by Toronto Croatia. After his season with Kingston, he had a trial and was signed by Indian-side Pune FC but was unable to acquire a work permit.

=== York Region ===
In 2015, he continued his tenure in the Southern Ontario-based circuit by signing with the York Region Shooters. The Vaughan-based club would clinch a postseason berth by finishing third in the division. In the initial stages of the postseason tournament, he assisted the club in defeating Burlington SC. Ultimately their playoff campaign concluded in the semifinal stages after a loss by the Croats. He would re-sign with York Region for the 2016 season where he helped secure the first division title. In the preliminary stage of the playoffs, York Region advanced to the next stage by defeating Milton SC. Once again the Vaughan was eliminated in the next round this time by Hamilton City. The 2017 season would mark his third and final season with the club. In his final season with York Region, he helped the club win the championship title after defeating Scarborough SC in a penalty shootout.

=== Scarborough SC ===
After a three-year stint with the Vaughan-based Shooters, he was acquired by league rivals Scarborough for the 2018 season. Scarborough would qualify for the playoffs and Simpson would make his second championship appearance after Scarborough defeated Ukraine United in the semifinals. He appeared in the championship final match against Vorkuta and contributed a goal but the team was defeated in a penalty shootout. Simpson returned for the 2019 season and once again secured a playoff berth by finishing second in the first division. He would contribute a goal against Kingsman SC that helped advance the club to the playoff finals. He made his third consecutive championship final appearance and assisted the eastern Toronto side in claiming their first championship title.

Scarborough would retain Simpson for the 2020 season. In his third season with the club, he would aid in securing the organization's first divisional title. He would make his fourth consecutive championship appearance where Scarborough would unsuccessfully defend their title against Vorkuta. The 2021 campaign marked his fourth run with the eastern Toronto side. During the 2021 season, he would win his third league championship. Simpson would have another run with Scarborough for the 2022 season. Throughout the 2022 campaign, the eastern Toronto side would achieve an 18-game undefeated streak and playoff position by finishing third. He made his sixth championship appearance, which Scarborough lost to FC Continentals (formerly FC Vorkuta).

In 2023, he signed for this sixth season with the club. Simpson would help the club win their second regular-season title.

== Honours ==
Arnett Gardens

- Jamaica Premier League: 2016–17

Scarborough SC

- CSL Championship: 2019, 2021
- Canadian Soccer League First Division: 2020, 2023

York Region Shooters

- CSL Championship: 2017
- Canadian Soccer League First Division: 2016
