= Georgi Jovicic =

Canadian soccer player

Personal information
- Full name: Georgi Jovicic
- Date of birth: 6 February 1996 (age 30)
- Place of birth: Vrbas, SFR Yugoslavia
- Height: 1.75 m (5 ft 9 in)
- Position: Goalkeeper

Team information
- Current team: Brantford Galaxy
- Number: 1

Youth career
- 2007–2014: Karlovac

Senior career*
Years	Team	Apps	(Gls)
2015–2017	SC Waterloo	23	(0)
2018–	Brantford Galaxy	28	(0)

International career
2019	Canada U23		
- * Club domestic league appearances and goals

Georgi Jovicic (born 6 February 1996) is a professional soccer player who plays for Brantford Galaxy SC in the Canadian Soccer League. Born in Yugoslavia, he has represented Canada at the international level.
