= Miloš Đurković (footballer, born 1987) =

Bosnian footballer

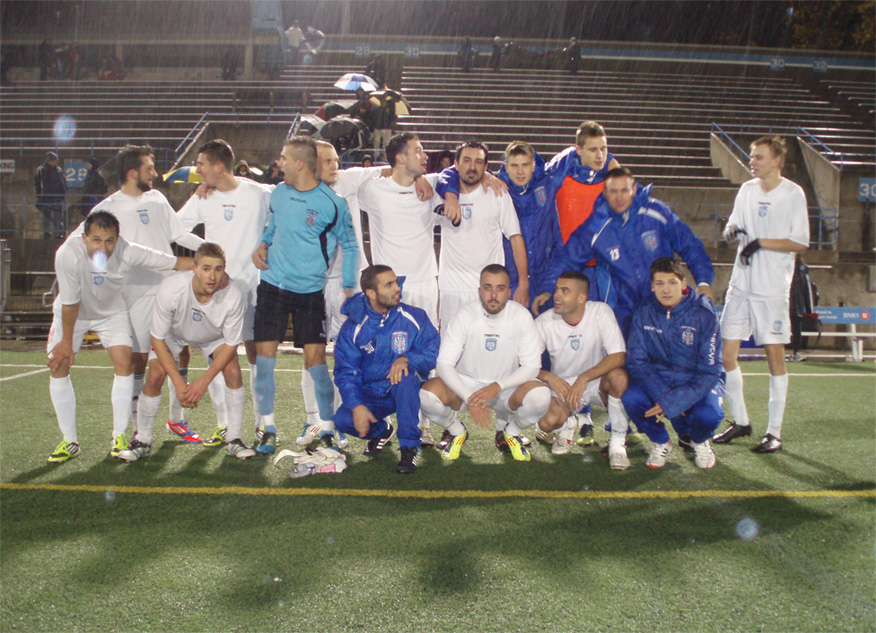
- Đurković in 2012

Personal information
- Date of birth: 23 September 1987 (age 39)
- Place of birth: Sokolac, SR Bosnia and Herzegovina, SFR Yugoslavia
- Position: Goalkeeper

Senior career*
Years	Team	Apps	(Gls)
2009–2010	Lovćen		
2010–2012	Serbian White Eagles		
2013–2014	Slavija Sarajevo	4	(0)
2014–2015	Mladost Velika Obarska	3	(0)
2015–2016	Radnik Bijeljina	2	(0)
2017–2018	Scarborough SC		
- * Club domestic league appearances and goals

Miloš Đurković (Serbian Cyrillic: Милош Ђурковић; born September 23, 1987) is a Bosnian former footballer who played as a goalkeeper.

== Club career ==
=== Early career ===
Đurković played in the top Montenegrin circuit throughout the 2009–10 season with FK Lovćen.

=== Serbian White Eagles ===
In 2010, he played abroad in the Canadian Soccer League with the Serbian White Eagles. He helped the Serbs in securing a playoff berth by finishing second in the league's first division. Brantford Galaxy defeated the White Eagles in the preliminary round of the postseason in a home and away-series.

Đurković would re-sign with the Serbs for another season in 2011. In his sophomore season with the Toronto-based team, he assisted the White Eagles in clinching another postseason berth by finishing fifth in the division. Their opposition in the opening round of the playoffs was Brampton City United, where the Serbs advanced to the next round. The Serbs were eliminated in the semi-final round by Capital City.

He re-signed for a third spell with the club in 2012. For the third consecutive season, he assisted the Serbs in qualifying for the playoffs by finishing sixth in the standings. In the early stages of the postseason, the Serbs eliminated SC Toronto from the competition. Ultimately, the White Eagles were eliminated from the playoffs in the next round by Toronto Croatia. After the conclusion of the season, he was nominated for the league's top goalkeeper award.

=== Bosnia ===
In the winter of 2013, he returned to his native country to initially train with FK Leotar. He would ultimately secure a deal with FK Slavija Sarajevo in the Premier League of Bosnia and Herzegovina. He made his debut for the club on September 25, 2013, against HŠK Zrinjski Mostar. After making four appearances with Slavija, his contract was mutually canceled in 2014.

He would remain in the top tier by signing with Mladost Velika Obarska the following season. In total, he would appear in 3 matches for Mladost. After a season with Mladost, he signed with Radnik Bijeljina in the summer of 2015. Throughout his tenure with Radnik, he helped the club win the 2015–16 Bosnia and Herzegovina Cup. In total, he appeared in 2 league matches and 5 cup matches. He would depart from the club following the conclusion of the season.

=== Canada ===
Đurković returned to the CSL in the summer of 2017 to play with Scarborough SC. In his debut season with Scarborough, he helped the club secure a playoff berth by finishing fourth in the division. In the opening round of the playoffs, Scarborough defeated Brantford. Scarborough would advance to the championship final after defeating FC Vorkuta in the semi-finals. He participated in the CSL Championship final, where Scarborough was defeated by York Region Shooters in a penalty shootout. Đurković re-signed with Scarborough for the 2018 season.

== Honours ==
Radnik Bijeljina

- Bosnia and Herzegovina Football Cup: 2015–16

Scarborough SC

- CSL Championship runner-up: 2017
