= Petar Vukadin =

Bosnian footballer

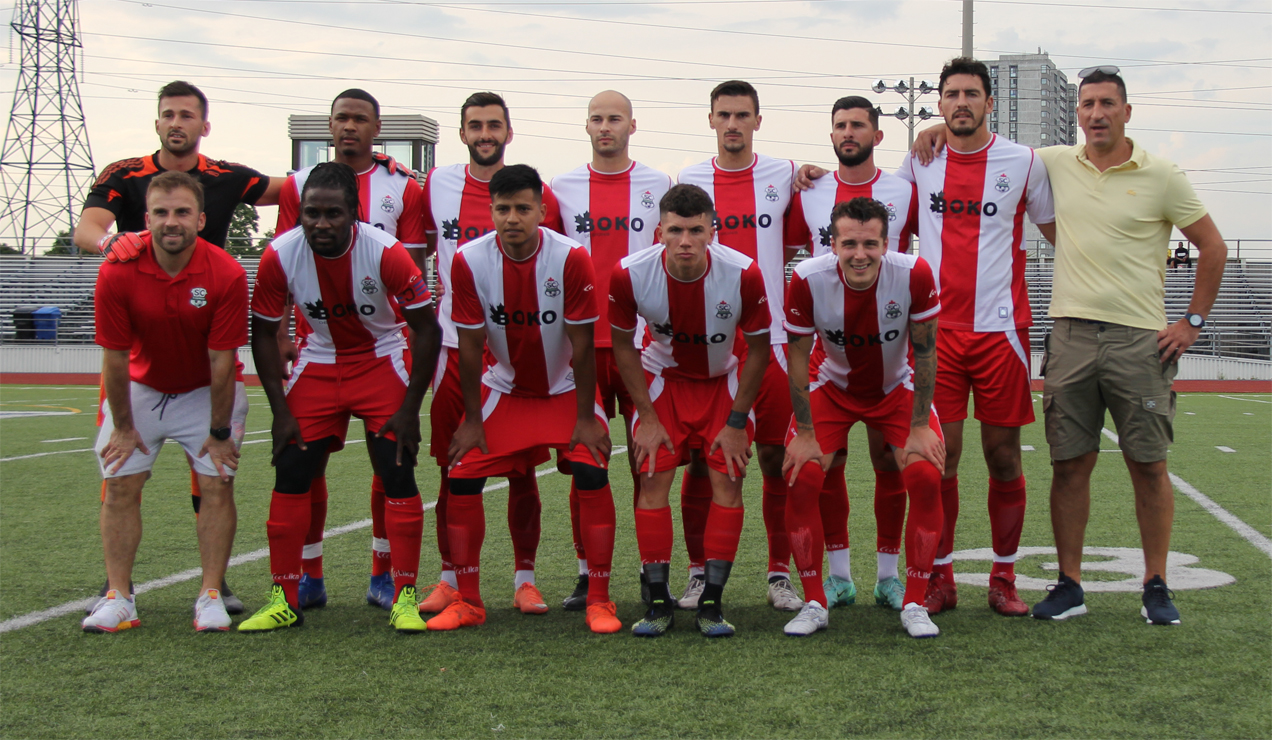
- Vukadin in 2022

Personal information
- Date of birth: 25 October 1995 (age 31)
- Place of birth: Livno, Bosnia and Herzegovina
- Position: Midfielder

Senior career*
Years	Team	Apps	(Gls)
2012–2013	Troglav 1918 Livno	9	(0)
2013–2014	NK Kamešnica Podhum	44	(9)
2014–2015	TSV 1912 Bachrain		
2015–2016	NK Kamešnica Podhum		
2015–2016	Rudeš	1	(0)
2016–2017	Junak Sinj	3	(0)
2017–2018	Vrapče	28	(0)
2018–2019	Croatia AC (indoor)		
2019	CSC Mississauga		
2022–2023	Scarborough SC		
- * Club domestic league appearances and goals

Petar Vukadin (born October 25, 1995) is a Bosnian footballer who plays as a midfielder.

== Club career ==
=== Early career ===
Vukadin played in the First League of Bosnia and Herzegovina with Troglav Livno in 2012. After a season in the Bosnian second division, he secured a contract with NK Kamešnica Podhum in the Second League of the Federation of Bosnia and Herzegovina. In his debut season with Kamešnica, he played in 44 matches and scored 9 goals.

=== Germany ===
He ventured abroad in 2014 to play at the German regional level with TSV 1912 Bachrain. Midway through the season, he announced his intentions to leave the club. A month later he departed from Germany.

=== Croatia ===
Following his stint abroad, he returned to his former club Kamešnica Podhum for the 2015–16 season where he served as the team captain. In the 2016 winter transfer market he was transferred to the Croatian second league to play with NK Rudeš. His stint with Rudeš lasted only a single season, as he would sign with Junak Sinj the following season. In 2017, he played with Vrapče and made 28 appearances for the club.

=== Canada ===
In the winter season of 2018–2019, he played indoor soccer abroad in the Canadian-based Arena Premier League with Croatia AC.

After the conclusion of the indoor season, he remained in Canada by signing with CSC Mississauga in the Southern Ontario-based Canadian Soccer League in the summer of 2019. In his debut season in the Canadian circuit, he helped Mississauga secure a playoff berth by finishing seventh in the league's first division. Mississauga would be eliminated from the playoff competition in the opening round by Scarborough SC.

In 2022, he returned to the Southern Ontario circuit, he signed with Scarborough. Throughout the 2022 campaign, the eastern Toronto side would achieve an 18-game undefeated streak and playoff position by finishing third. Scarborough would qualify for the championship final after defeating the York Region Shooters in the semifinals. He appeared in the championship match where FC Continentals defeated Scarborough.

He returned to Scarborough for the 2023 season. Vukadin would help the club secure the regular-season title.

== Personal life ==
Vukadin married Amanda De Ruta in 2023.

== Honours ==
Scarborough SC

- Canadian Soccer League Regular Season: 2023
