= Kostyantyn Derevlyov =

Ukrainian footballer (born 1983)

Personal information
- Full name: Kostyantyn Mykolayovych Derevlyov
- Date of birth: 11 July 1983 (age 43)
- Place of birth: Lviv, Soviet Union (now Ukraine)
- Height: 1.73 m (5 ft 8 in)
- Position: Midfielder

Youth career
- 1999–2000: Karpaty Lviv

Senior career*
Years	Team	Apps	(Gls)
2001	Lviv	6	(1)
2001	Karpaty-2 Lviv	12	(1)
2001	→ Karpaty-3 Lviv	6	(0)
2002	→ Sokil Zolochiv (loan)	29	(8)
2003	Arsenal Kyiv	3	(0)
2003	→ Arsenal-2 Kyiv	3	(1)
2003	CSKA Kyiv	6	(2)
2004	Zakarpattia Uzhhorod	16	(1)
2004–2006	Hazovyk-Skala Stryi	24	(0)
2004–2005	→ Spartak Sumy (loan)	9	(0)
2005–2006	→ Enerhetyk Burshtyn (loan)	15	(1)
2006–2007	Lviv	32	(2)
2007–2010	Arsenal Bila Tserkva	88	(30)
2010–2011	Naftovyk-Ukrnafta Okhtyrka	40	(6)
2012	Poltava	9	(0)
2012–2014	Rukh Vynnyky	73	(16)
2015	Hetman Żółkiewka	10	(0)
2015	Veres Rivne	8	(2)
2016	Ukraine United	21	(9)
2016	Karyer Torchynovychi	4	(1)
2018	Dumna Remeniv	1	(0)
2019	Yunist Verkhnya Bilka	7	(3)
2019	Karyer-Dnister Torchynovychi	8	(5)
2020	Nashe Maybutnye Berezhany	0	(0)
2020	Karyer-Dnister Torchynovychi	11	(4)
2020–2021	Karpaty Lviv	15	(8)
2021–2024	Feniks Pidmonastyr	11	(2)

International career
2003	Ukraine U21	1	(0)
- * Club domestic league appearances and goals as of 8 October 2021

Kostyantyn Mykolayovych Derevlyov (Ukrainian: Костянтин Миколайович Деревльов; born 11 July 1983) is a Ukrainian amateur and former professional footballer who played as a midfielder.

== Club career ==
=== Early career ===
Derevlyov began his career in 2000 with FC Lviv in the Ukrainian First League. After the dissolution of Lviv, he joined Karpaty Lviv and played in the Ukrainian Second League with the club's two reserve teams, known as Karpaty-2 Lviv and Karpaty-3 Lviv. In 2001, he played with Sokil Zolochiv and won promotion for the club to the first league. He played in the country's top tier, the Ukrainian Premier League, with Arsenal Kyiv. He returned to the first league in 2003 to play with CSKA Kyiv.

In the winter of 2004, he joined Hoverla Uzhhorod and helped the club secure a promotion by winning the league title. After the promotion of Uzhhorod, he would remain playing in the country's second-tier division with various clubs as Skala Stryi, Spartak Sumy, and Enerhetyk Burshtyn. In 2006, he signed a contract with FC Lviv.

Derevlyov returned to the third-tier league by signing with Arsenal-Kyivshchyna Bila Tserkva in late 2007. In his debut season with Arsenal, he finished as the club's top goal scorer with 13 goals. He was named the team captain the following season and assisted the team in securing a promotion to the second division.

Following his release from Bila Tserkva, he remained in the second division and finished the season with Naftovyk-Ukrnafta Okhtyrka. He re-signed with the club for the next season. However, his second season with Naftovyk was cut short as his contract was mutually terminated.

After his release from Naftovyk, he played with Poltava for the remainder of the campaign. In his short stint with Poltava, he helped the club secure a promotion after winning their group.

In 2012, he played in the country's national amateur league with Rukh Lviv. He would help Lviv win the league title in 2014.

=== Poland ===
In 2013, he was invited across the border for a trial with the Polish side Sandecja Nowy Sącz. He would ultimately land a contract in the Polish III liga with Hetman Żółkiewka for the 2014–15 season. He left the club after they were relegated.

Following his brief stint in Poland, he played his final season in the Ukrainian professional scene with Veres Rivne in the country's third division.

=== Canada ===
Derevlyov ventured abroad once more in the summer of 2016 to play in the Canadian Soccer League with FC Ukraine United. In his debut season, he recorded 9 goals in 21 matches and secured a postseason berth for the club by finishing second in the league's first division. He contributed a goal in the quarterfinal match against Brantford Galaxy in a 3–0 victory. Their opponents in the next round were the Serbian White Eagles, where they were eliminated from the playoffs by a 1–0 loss.

=== Return to Ukraine ===
Derevlyov returned to Ukraine, where he played with several teams in the Lviv regional amateur league.

== International career ==
Derevlyov played with the Ukraine national under-21 football team and debuted on October 11, 2003, against Macedonia.

== Honors ==
Hoverla Uzhhorod

- Ukrainian First League: 2003–04

Poltava

- Ukrainian Second League Group B: 2011–12

Rukh Lviv

- Ukrainian Football Amateur League: 2014
