= Jesús Compeán =

Mexican footballer (born 1989)

Personal information
- Full name: Jesús Eduardo Compeán Gonzalez
- Date of birth: 23 January 1989 (age 37)
- Place of birth: Tantoyuca, Veracruz, Mexico
- Position: Defender

Team information
- Current team: Scarborough SC

Senior career*
Years	Team	Apps	(Gls)
2011	Cruz Azul Jasso	10	(0)
2011–2012	Cruz Azul Hidalgo	18	(0)
2012–2013	Real Cuautitlán	10	(0)
2013–2014	Albinegros de Orizaba	26	(1)
2014–2015	Potros UAEM	23	(1)
2019–2020	Scarborough SC		(1)
2021–2022	FC Vorkuta		(0)
2023–	Scarborough SC		
- * Club domestic league appearances and goals as of 31 August 2021

Jesús Eduardo "Chucho" Compeán Gonzalez (born 23 January 1989) is a Mexican footballer who plays as a defender for Canadian Soccer League club Scarborough FC.

== Playing career ==
=== Mexico ===
Compeán played in the Segunda División de México in 2011 with Cruz Azul Jasso. He played in the Ascenso MX with Cruz Azul Hidalgo, and made his debut on 21 August 2011 against Irapuato F.C. In 2012, he returned to the Segunda Division to play with Real Cuautitlán. He also played with Albinegros de Orizaba, and Potros UAEM.

=== Canada ===
In 2019, he played abroad in the Canadian Soccer League with Scarborough SC. In 2020, he was featured in the CSL Championship final against FC Vorkuta but was defeated by a score of 2–1.

The following season he played with league rivals Vorkuta. He assisted in securing Vorkuta's third regular-season title and secured the ProSound Cup against Scarborough. He also played in the 2021 playoffs where Vorkuta was defeated by his former team Scarborough in the championship final.

== Honours ==
=== Club ===
FC Vorkuta

- Canadian Soccer League Regular Season: 2021
- ProSound Cup: 2021
