= Stefan Vukovic =

Canadian soccer player and coach

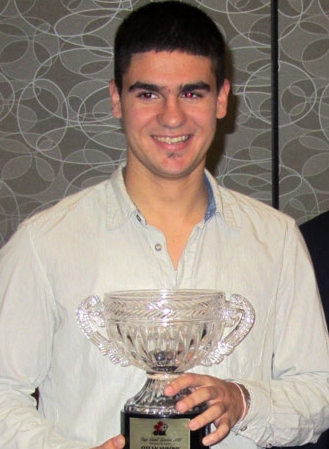
- Stefan Vukovic in 2011

Personal information
- Full name: Stefan Vukovic
- Date of birth: 18 March 1993 (age 33)
- Place of birth: Hamilton, Ontario, Canada
- Height: 1.81 m (5 ft 11 in)
- Position: Forward

Senior career*
Years	Team	Apps	(Gls)
2009–2010	Serbian White Eagles		
2011–2012	TFC Academy	22	(18)
2012	Montreal Impact Academy	8	(4)
2013	Śląsk Wrocław	0	(0)
2013	ŠTK 1914 Šamorín	0	(0)
2013–2014	Zakynthos	7	(0)
2014	K-W United		
2015	TFC Academy	5	(0)
2015	Toronto FC II	6	(0)
2016–2017	Brantford Galaxy	35	(11)

International career
2011	Canada U18		
2012–2013	Canada U20	2	(1)
- * Club domestic league appearances and goals

Stefan Vukovic (born March 18, 1993) is a Canadian soccer coach and former player.

== Career ==
=== Club career ===
Vukovic began his career in 2009 with the Serbian White Eagles of the Canadian Soccer League. In 2010, he helped Serbia finish as runners-up in the regular season, and featured in the quarterfinals against Brantford Galaxy, but were defeated by a score of 1-0. In 2011, he signed with TFC Academy and won the CSL Golden Boot in 2011. The following season, he was transferred to the Montreal Impact Academy and clinched a postseason berth for the club by finishing second in the standings. Vukovic went abroad to Poland to sign with Śląsk Wrocław, and at the conclusion of the season, he joined Slovak outfit ŠTK 1914 Šamorín, before moving to Greek side A.P.S. Zakynthos a few months later.

In 2014, he returned to Canada to sign with K-W United FC of the USL Premier Development League. Vukovic returned to TFC Academy in 2015, but was soon loaned to TFC's reserve team, Toronto FC II, in the United Soccer League. In 2016, he returned to the CSL to sign with Brantford Galaxy.

=== International career ===
Vukovic appeared for the Canada U20 side at the 2013 CONCACAF U-20 Championship and at the 2013 Jeux de la Francophonie.

== Managerial career ==
Vukovic was the U10 and U13 head coach for the Hamilton Serbians from 2016 to 2018. In 2018, he served as an assistant coach for Hamilton City SC in the Canadian Soccer League. He also became associated with the Burlington SC Academy as the U12 and U15 head coach.
