= Luka Bešenić =

Croatian footballer

Personal information
- Full name: Luka Bešenić
- Date of birth: 12 July 1987 (age 39)
- Place of birth: Varaždin, SFR Yugoslavia
- Height: 1.86 m (6 ft 1 in)
- Position: Goalkeeper

Youth career
- –2005: Varteks

Senior career*
Years	Team	Apps	(Gls)
2006	Sloboda Varaždin		
2006–2010	Varteks	10	(0)
2008–2009	→ Koprivnica (loan)		
2009–2010	→ Sloboda Varaždin (loan)		
2010–2012	Međimurje	20	(0)
2012–2013	Vrbovec		
2013	Podravina		
2013–2014	Zavrč	5	(0)
2014–2015	SV Neuberg	17	(0)
2015	Brantford Galaxy		
2016	ASKÖ Stinatz	0	(0)
2017	Međimurje		
2018–	NK Zelengaj Donji Kucan		
- * Club domestic league appearances and goals as of 17 January 2019

Luka Bešenić (born 12 July 1987) is a Croatian football goalkeeper who currently plays with NK Zelengaj Donji Kucan.

== Club career ==
Bešenić began his career in the 4. HNL with Sloboda Varaždin. Shortly after he was signed by NK Varteks in the Croatian First Football League, where he featured in ten matches. He had loan spells with NK Koprivnica, and Sloboda Varaždin. In 2010, he signed with NK Međimurje in the Croatian Second Football League. He also spent time n the 3. HNL with NK Vrbovec, and NK Podravina.

In 2013, he went abroad to play in the Slovenian PrvaLiga with NK Zavrč. In 2015, he went further abroad to play with Brantford Galaxy in the Canadian Soccer League. After two seasons in Canada he returned to the Croatian Third Football League to play with NK Međimurje, where he assisted in securing promotion. In 2018, he signed with NK Zelengaj Donji Kucan. He also had spells with two Austrian lower league clubs.
