= Vladimir Markotić =

Croatian footballer

Personal information
- Full name: Vladimir Markotić
- Date of birth: 17 June 1980 (age 46)
- Place of birth: Čitluk, SFR Yugoslavia
- Height: 6 ft 3 in (1.91 m)
- Position: Goalkeeper

Senior career*
| Years | Team | Apps | (Gls) |
| 2003–2004 | Brotnjo Čitluk | | |
| 2004–2005 | Željezničar Sarajevo | 24 | (0) |
| 2005–2007 | Zagreb | 13 | (0) |
| 2007–2009 | Posušje | 20 | (0) |
| 2010–2011 | Brantford Galaxy | 16 | (0) |
| 2012–2015 | London City | | |
- * Club domestic league appearances and goals

Vladimir Markotić (born June 17, 1980) is a Bosnian Croat retired goalkeeper who played in the Premier League of Bosnia and Herzegovina, Croatian First Football League, Second League of the Federation of Bosnia and Herzegovina, and the Canadian Soccer League.

== Club career ==
Markotić began his career in 2003 with NK Brotnjo in the First League of Herzeg-Bosnia. The next season, he signed with FK Željezničar Sarajevo, before transferring to the Croatian First Football League to sign with NK Zagreb. In 2007, he returned to Bosnia to play with NK Posušje of the Premier League of Bosnia and Herzegovina. In 2011, he went overseas to Canada to sign with Brantford Galaxy of the Canadian Soccer League. In 2012, he signed with rivals London City, and in 2013 he assisted London in clinching a postseason berth for the first time since the 2000 season. He featured in the quarterfinals against York Region Shooters, and advanced to the next round. Their opponents were Kingston FC, but were eliminated from the playoffs by a score of 4–2.
