= Theofanis Sotiris =

Greek footballer

Personal information
- Full name: Theofanis Sotiris
- Date of birth: 23 February 1993 (age 33)
- Place of birth: Greece
- Position: Midfielder

Senior career*
Years	Team	Apps	(Gls)
2012–2013	Doxa Kranoula F.C.	6	(0)
2017	York Region Shooters	5	(3)
- * Club domestic league appearances and goals as of 11 December 2017

Theofanis Sotiris (born February 23, 1993) is a Greek footballer.

== Career ==
Sotiris played in the Gamma Ethniki in 2012 with Doxa Kranoula F.C, where he appeared in six matches. In 2017, he played in the Canadian Soccer League with York Region Shooters. He recorded his first two goals for the club on July 2, 2017, against Royal Toronto FC.
