= Ricardo Munguía (footballer, born 1944) =

Mexican footballer (1944–2007)

Personal information
- Full name: Ricardo Munguía Padilla
- Date of birth: April 3, 1944
- Place of birth: Mexico City, Mexico
- Date of death: February 17, 2007 (aged 62)
- Place of death: Mexico City, Mexico
- Position: Left back

Senior career*
Years	Team	Apps	(Gls)
1960–1968	Club América		
1968	San Diego Toros	25	(0)
1969	Baltimore Bays	4	(0)
1970	Dallas Tornado	17	(1)
1970–1974	Veracruz		
1974–1975	Ciudad Madero		
1975–1976	San Luis		
- * Club domestic league appearances and goals

Ricardo Munguía Padilla (April 3, 1944 – February 17, 2007) was a Mexican footballer who played as a defender.

His son Ricardo Munguía Pérez (also nicknamed Ringo) was also a footballer.
