= Ricardo Munguía (footballer, born 1975) =

Mexican footballer (born 1975)

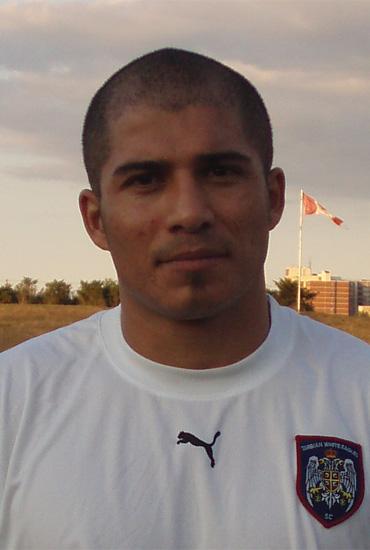
- Munguía in 2007

Personal information
- Full name: Ricardo Munguía Pérez
- Date of birth: 5 June 1975 (age 51)
- Place of birth: Mexico City, Mexico
- Height: 5 ft 10 in (1.78 m)
- Position: Defender

Youth career
- Veracruz

Senior career*
Years	Team	Apps	(Gls)
1993–1997	Veracruz	39	(0)
1996	→ Correcaminos UAT (loan)		
1996	→ Acapulco (loan)		
1997–1998	Atlético Yucatán		
1999	Toronto Lynx	23	(0)
2000–2001	San Luis		
2001	Atletico Chiapas	0	(0)
2002	Albinegros de Orizaba	15	(0)
2003	Oaxaca	15	(0)
2003–2004	Tlaxcala	25	(0)
2004–2005	Pioneros de Obregón	28	(1)
2005	Lagartos de Tabasco	12	(1)
2006–2007	Coatzacoalcos	29	(0)
2007–2008	Serbian White Eagles		
2008	Veracruz	1	(0)
2009–2010	Albinegros de Orizaba	38	(1)
2011	Serbian White Eagles		
2011–2012	Estudiantes de Altamira	15	(0)
2015	Scarborough SC		

International career
1993–1995	Mexico U20	1	(0)

Managerial career
- 2012–2013: Albinegros de Orizaba
- 2016: Scarborough SC
Medal record
Representing Mexico
Men's football
Pan American Games
Silver medal – second place	1995 Mar del Plata	Team competition
- * Club domestic league appearances and goals

Ricardo Munguía Pérez (born 5 June 1975) is a Mexican former professional footballer who played as a defender.

== Club career ==
=== Early career ===
Munguía debuted with Veracruz on 13 November 1993, in a 1–1 draw against Puebla.

In 1999, he played abroad in the USL A-League with the Toronto Lynx. Munguía made 23 appearances with Toronto.

In 2005, he played with Lagartos de Tabasco. After a season with Lagartos, he joined Coatzacoalcos in 2006.

=== Canada ===
On 17 July 2007, Munguía went on trial with the Serbian White Eagles in the Canadian Soccer League (CSL). His trial was successful, and he joined the club a few days after the Ontario Soccer Association approved his international transfer. He debuted for the club on 10 August 2007, in a 6–3 win over the North York Astros. In his debut season, he helped the Serbs win the divisional title and qualify for the playoffs.

In the opening round of the playoffs, they advanced to the next round by defeating the Windsor Border Stars. Munguía played in the semifinal round against Trois-Rivières Attak but missed the championship final after receiving an injury. The Serbs would be defeated in the championship series against Toronto Croatia.

=== Return to Mexico ===
After his second run in Canada, he returned to his former club Veracruz in 2008. His second stint with Veracruz saw limited playing time as he sustained an injury. Shortly after, he re-joined Albinegros and was the team captain for the 2010 season.

=== Later career ===
Munguía re-joined the Serbian White Eagles before the 2011 CSL season. He helped the Serbs secure a playoff berth by finishing fifth in the division. In the opening round of the postseason, Serbia advanced to the semifinals by defeating Brampton City United. Their playoff journey concluded in the following round after being eliminated by the Ottawa-based Capital City.

Munguía had his final spell in Mexico with Estudiantes de Altamira for the 2011–12 season. His final season in the CSL circuit was in 2015 as he played with expansion side Scarborough SC.

== International career ==
Munguía was part of the Mexican national under-20 team that played in the 1993 FIFA World Youth Championship. He also won a silver medal with Mexico at the 1995 Pan American Games.

== Managerial career ==
In 2012, Munguía was named the manager of his former club Albinegros de Orizaba, and left for personal reasons in 2013.

He returned to the Canadian Soccer League in the summer of 2016 to manage Scarborough SC. He led the eastern Toronto club to a playoff berth by finishing third in the league's first division. In the postseason, Scarborough was eliminated in the opening round by Hamilton City.

He is also an academy coach for Cherry Beach Soccer Club.

== Personal life ==
His father Ricardo Munguía Padilla (also nicknamed Ringo) was a footballer.

== Honors ==
Serbian White Eagles

- Canadian Soccer League International Division: 2007
- CSL Championship runner-up: 2007

Mexico

- Pan American Games Silver Medal: 1995
