= John Trye =

Sierra Leonean footballer

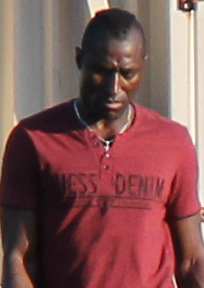
- Trye in 2022

Personal information
- Date of birth: 16 March 1985 (age 41)
- Place of birth: Freetown, Sierra Leone
- Height: 6 ft 2 in (1.88 m)
- Position: Goalkeeper

Team information
- Current team: Dynamo Toronto

Senior career*
| Years | Team | Apps | (Gls) |
| 2002–2004 | F.C. Kallon | | |
| 2007–2008 | Alianza F.C. | | |
| 2011–2012 | Northern Virginia Royals | | |
| 2014–2015 | ASA Charge | | |
| 2017–2020 | Scarborough SC | | |
| 2021–2024 | Serbian White Eagles | | |
| 2024– | Dynamo Toronto | | |

International career
| 2011–2019 | Sierra Leone | 2 | (0) |
- * Club domestic league appearances and goals as of 2 November 2018

John Trye (born 16 March 1985) is a Sierra Leonean footballer who plays as a goalkeeper.

== Club career ==
=== Early career ===
Trye began his career in 2002 in the Sierra Leone National First Division with F.C. Kallon. In 2007, he went abroad to play in the Salvadoran Primera División with Alianza F.C. In 2011, he played in the USL Premier Development League with Northern Virginia Royals. He resumed his career in the United States by playing in the National Premier Soccer League in 2014 for ASA Charge. Throughout his tenure with ASA, he appeared in the Maryland Cup in 2016.

=== North America ===
After several seasons in America, he went north of the border to Canada in 2016 for a trial session with Canadian Soccer League side Toronto Atomic. He ultimately signed with league rivals Scarborough SC in 2017. In his debut season with Scarborough, he assisted the club in reaching the CSL Championship final. Unfortunately, Scarborough was defeated in a penalty shootout by York Region Shooters in the finals.

He re-signed with Scarborough for the 2018 season. He assisted the club in securing a postseason berth and played in the semifinal match against Ukraine United, where Scarborough advanced to the championship final. In the championship final, Vorkuta defeated Scarborough in a penalty shootout. In 2019, he returned to play with Scarborough for his third season. The club secured a playoff berth throughout the season by finishing second in the league's first division. For the third consecutive season, the eastern-based Toronto side reached the final and successfully defeated Ukraine United to secure the championship.

He extended his contract with Scarborough in 2020 for his fourth and final season. He helped the club claim the First Division title in his final season with Scarborough. Scarborough would also, for the fourth consecutive season, reach the championship final but failed to defend their title against Vorkuta.

In 2021, he signed with league rivals Serbian White Eagles. His season was cut short after sustaining a serious injury in the opening round match against Vorkuta in the ProSound Cup tournament. He re-signed with the Serbs for the 2022 season. The Serbs would secure the regular-season title.

== International career ==
Trye made his debut for the Sierra Leone national football team on 9 February 2011 against Nigeria. He was called to the national team roster on September 7, 2013, against Equatorial Guinea. In 2014, he made his second national team appearance against Congo DR in the 2015 Africa Cup of Nations qualification. He was also called up for another 2015 Africa Cup of Nations qualification match against Cameroon.

He was named to a 35-man provisional roster in 2018, organized by head coach John Keister in preparation for the 2019 Africa Cup of Nations qualification. In 2019, he received another call-up to the national team to serve as a backup against Benin and Lesotho for the 2021 Africa Cup of Nations qualification.

== Managerial career ==
In 2017, he joined SC Toronto's goalkeeping technical staff to assist their Ontario Player Development League team. In March 2021, he became a soccer coach at International SC in Mississauga. In 2024, he served as a goalkeeper coach for Ajax SC 2009.

== Honors ==
Scarborough SC

- CSL Championship: 2019
- Canadian Soccer League First Division: 2020
- CSL Championship runner-up: 2017

Serbian White Eagles

- Canadian Soccer League Regular Season: 2022
