= Zoran Roglić =

Croatian footballer

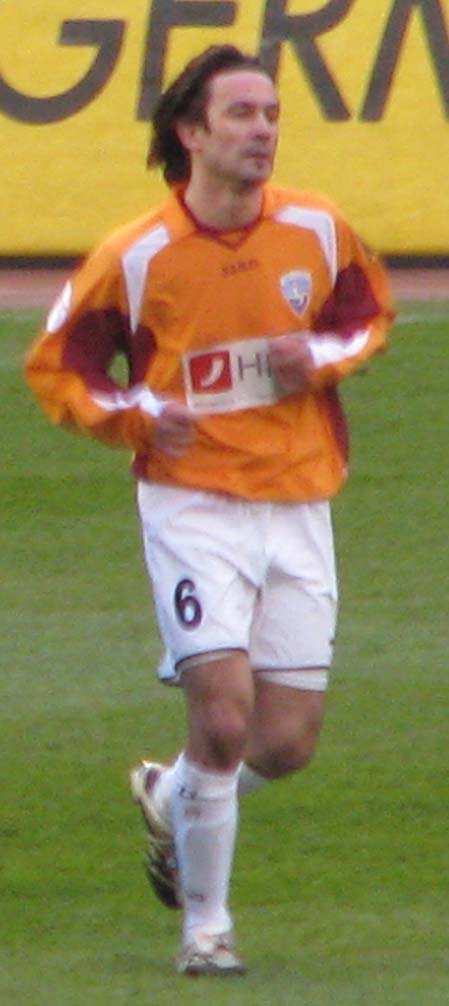
- Roglić with Šibenik in 2009

Personal information
- Full name: Zoran Roglić
- Date of birth: 16 May 1976 (age 50)
- Place of birth: Split, SFR Yugoslavia
- Height: 1.72 m (5 ft 8 in)
- Position: Defender

Senior career*
Years	Team	Apps	(Gls)
1998–1999	RNK Split		
1999–2004	Mosor Žrnovnica		
2004–2005	Hajduk Split	2	(0)
2005–2010	Šibenik	70	(2)
2010	Brantford Galaxy		
2010–2011	Mosor Žrnovnica	8	(0)
2011	Mladost Proložac	11	(0)
2011–2012	Zagora Unešić	27	(2)
- * Club domestic league appearances and goals

Zoran Roglić (born 16 May 1976) is a Croatian former football defender who played in the Croatian Second Football League, Croatian First Football League, and the Canadian Soccer League.

== Career ==
Roglić began his career in 1998 in the Croatian Second Football League with RNK Split. The following season he signed with NK Mosor, and in 2004 he signed with HNK Hajduk Split of the Croatian First Football League, where he won the Croatian Championship in the 2004-05 season. During his time in the First Division he also played with HNK Šibenik and featured in 54 matches and recorded two goals. In 2010, he went overseas to Canada to sign with Brantford Galaxy of the Canadian Soccer League. Midway through the season he returned to Croatia to play with Mosor. He finished off his career in the Croatian Second League with NK Mladost Proložac, and NK Zagora Unešić.
