= Dejan Ristić (footballer) =

Serbian footballer

Personal information
- Full name: Dejan Ristić
- Date of birth: 6 March 1978 (age 48)
- Place of birth: Jagodina, SFR Yugoslavia
- Height: 1.78 m (5 ft 10 in)
- Position: Defensive midfielder

Senior career*
Years	Team	Apps	(Gls)
2001	→ Zvezdara (loan)	8	(0)
2002–2003	OFK Niš	27	(1)
2003–2007	Car Konstantin		
2003–2004	→ Radnički Pirot (loan)	11	(0)
2009–2010	→ Kosanica (loan)	35	(1)
2010	→ OFK Niš (loan)	18	(2)
2006	→ Radnički Niš (loan)	35	(0)
2007	→ Sevojno (loan)	16	(1)
2007–2008	Sevojno	15	(1)
2008	→ Radnički Niš (loan)	16	(0)
2008–2009	Dinamo Vranje	23	(0)
2009–2011	Mladi Radnik Požarevac	53	(0)
2011	Sinđelić Niš	16	(1)
2012–2013	Mladi Radnik Požarevac	41	(0)
2013–2014	Smederevo	24	(0)
2015–2019	Brantford Galaxy		
- * Club domestic league appearances and goals as of 23 October 2016

Dejan Ristić (Serbian Cyrillic: Дејан Ристић; born 6 March 1978) is a Serbian football midfielder who played as a midfielder.

== Career ==
Ristić began his career in 2001 with FK Zvezdara in the Second League of FR Yugoslavia. During his time in the Second League he played with OFK Niš, FK Car Konstantin, FK Radnički Pirot, FK Kosanica, and FK Radnički Niš. In 2007, he signed with FK Sevojno in the Serbian First League, and signed with Dinamo Vranje in 2008. He left Dinamo after one season, claiming the club failed to pay his wages. In 2009, he signed with FK Mladi Radnik and played in the Serbian SuperLiga. After the relegation of Mladi he returned to the Serbian First League and stints with FK Sinđelić Niš, and FK Smederevo 1924. In 2015, he went overseas to Canada to sign with the Brantford Galaxy in the Canadian Soccer League.
