= Zdravko Karadachki =

Bulgarian footballer (born 1993)

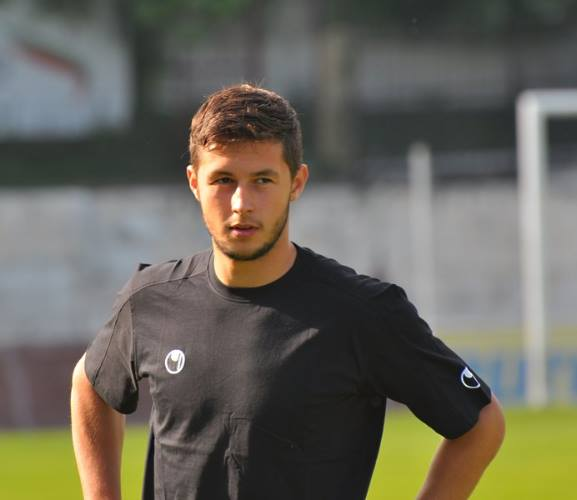
- Karadachki in 2016

Personal information
- Full name: Zdravko Viktorov Karadachki
- Date of birth: 21 June 1993 (age 33)
- Place of birth: Blagoevgrad, Bulgaria
- Position: Defender

Senior career*
Years	Team	Apps	(Gls)
2010–2016	Septemvri Simitli	74	(2)
2013	→ Pirin Blagoevgrad (loan)	24	(0)
2016–2017	Scarborough SC	34	(2)
2017–2018	Edinburgh City	9	(0)
2018–2019	Alloa Athletic	3	(0)
2019–2021	Septemvri Simitli	22	(1)
2021–2022	Vendée Fontenay Foot	9	(0)
2022–2023	La Rochelle		
2023	Vihren Sandanski		
2024–	Septemvri Simitli		
- * Club domestic league appearances and goals as of 30 July 2022

Zdravko Karadachki (born 21 June 1993) is a Bulgarian professional footballer who plays as a defender for Septemvri Simitli.

== Career ==
Karadachki began playing in 2010 with Septemvri Simitli in the Second Professional Football League. In 2013, he was loaned to Pirin Blagoevgrad. In 2016, he played abroad in the Canadian Soccer League with Scarborough SC. After two seasons with Scarborough, he played in the Scottish League Two with Edinburgh City In 2018, he was transferred to Alloa Athletic in the Scottish Championship.

After the conclusion of the season, he departed from Alloa Athletic. Shortly after returned to Septemvri Simitli to play in the Bulgarian Third League. In 2020, he assisted Septemvri Simitli in securing promotion to the Second Professional Football League. He signed a contract with Vendée Fontenay Foot in 2021 to play in the Championnat National 3. Karadachki resumed playing in France by signing with ES La Rochelle in the western side of France in 2022.

In the summer of 2023, he returned to his native Bulgaria to play with Vihren Sandanski. In 2024, he returned to his former club Septemvri Simitli.

== Career statistics ==
As of 15 November 2019

Appearances and goals by club, season and competition
Club	Season	League			National cup		League cup		Continental		Total	
Club	Season	Division	Apps	Goals	Apps	Goals	Apps	Goals	Apps	Goals	Apps	Goals
Edinburgh City	2017–18	Scottish League Two	9	0	0	0	2	0	0	0	11	0
Alloa Athletic	2018–19	Scottish Championship	3	0	0	0	4	0	0	0	7	0
Career total			12	0	0	0	6	0	0	0	18	0
