= Joey Melo =

Canadian professional soccer player (born 1989)

Personal information
- Full name: Jose Alberto Oliveira Melo
- Date of birth: January 25, 1989 (age 37)
- Place of birth: Milton, Ontario, Canada
- Height: 5 ft 9 in (1.75 m)
- Position: Midfielder

Youth career
- Dixie SC

Senior career*
Years	Team	Apps	(Gls)
2007–2008	Toronto FC	5	(0)
2010	Havant & Waterlooville	1	(0)
2011–2013	Mississauga Eagles FC		(11)
2013–2014	Astros Vasas FC	34	(16)
2015	Scarborough SC	21	(7)
2016	North Mississauga SC	18	(11)
2017–2018	Master's Futbol	28	(10)
Total		107+	(55)

International career
2005	Canada U17	1	(0)
2008	Canada U20	1	(0)
- * Club domestic league appearances and goals as of 31 December 2018

Jose "Joey" Alberto Oliveira Melo (born January 25, 1989) is a former Canadian professional soccer player.

== Club career ==
Melo played youth soccer with Dixie SC.

Melo began his professional career in 2007 after signing a contract with Toronto FC of the Major League Soccer. He made his professional debut on June 17, 2007 as a 92nd-minute substitute against FC Dallas. He made five substitute appearances in 2007 and also played in friendly matches against Portuguese club Benfica and English club Aston Villa, but did not make any league appearances in 2008. Toronto declined to exercise his contract option for the 2009 season.

In February 2009, he went on trial with USL club Vancouver Whitecaps FC. In 2010, he appeared with the Toronto FC Reserves in the MLS Reserve League.

In 2010, he went abroad to England to sign with Havant & Waterlooville F.C.

In 2011, he returned to Canada to sign with the Mississauga Eagles FC of the Canadian Soccer League. He helped Mississauga secure a postseason berth, by finishing seventh in the overall standings. In 2012, he was appointed the team captain. In 2013, after the folding of Mississauga, the roster was merged to the North York Astros, known as Astros Vasas FC, with whom he played for.

After North York left the CSL in 2015, he signed with expansion franchise Scarborough SC.

In 2016, he played with North Mississauga SC in League1 Ontario. In his debut season with Mississauga he was selected to the L1O West All-Star team. In 2017 and 2018, he played with Master's Futbol in League1 Ontario.

== International career ==
In 2004, he attended a Canada U15 camp.

He made his international debut with the Canada U17 on April 16, 2005 against Scotland.
