= Aleksandar Stojiljković =

Serbian footballer (born 1990)

Personal information
- Full name: Aleksandar Stojiljković
- Date of birth: 24 May 1990 (age 36)
- Place of birth: Bačka Palanka, SFR Yugoslavia
- Height: 1.84 m (6 ft 0 in)
- Position: Midfielder

Senior career*
Years	Team	Apps	(Gls)
2006–2010	ČSK Čelarevo	13	(1)
2008	→ OFK Futog (loan)		
2008	→ Radnički Šid (loan)	11	(7)
2009	→ Bačka Palanka (loan)	6	(3)
2009	→ Metalac Futog (loan)	0	(0)
2010–2011	Sopot	18	(1)
2011–2012	OFK Beograd	0	(0)
2012	→ Čukarički (loan)	15	(2)
2012–2014	Čukarički	19	(3)
2014	→ Sinđelić Beograd (loan)	6	(0)
2014–2015	Waterloo Region	38	(9)
2016–2022	Scarborough	60	(46)
- * Club domestic league appearances and goals

Aleksandar Stojiljković (Serbian Cyrillic: Александар Стојиљковић; born 24 May 1990) is a Serbian footballer who played as a midfielder.

== Club career ==
=== Serbia ===
He started his career with ČSK Čelarevo, but he was sent out on loan several times. Later, he joined Sopot and OFK Beograd. He played with Čukarički since 2012 and was one of the players who stayed at the club after the arrival of a new owner. After Čukarički was promoted to the Jelen SuperLiga, he didn't get much game time, playing just two matches in the league and two in the cup, and he was sent on loan to Sinđelić Beograd. He would make his debut for Čukarički in the top tier on October 23, 2013, against FK Voždovac. He also appeared in both of Čukarički's matches in the 2013–14 Serbian Cup.

=== Canada ===
In 2014, he played abroad in Canada with SC Waterloo Region in the southern Ontario-based Canadian Soccer League. He was named the league's rookie of the year in his debut season. Following a notable debut season, he re-signed with Waterloo for the 2015 season. He would assist the club in securing a postseason berth by finishing fourth in the First Division. Waterloo would reach the CSL Championship final where they were defeated by Toronto Croatia by a score of 1-0.

After a two-year spell with Waterloo, he signed with league rivals Scarborough SC in 2016. He helped the club record their first season victory when Stojiljković contributed a goal against the Serbian White Eagles. He returned to the Toronto-based club for the 2017 season. On August 27, 2017, he recorded his first hat trick for the organization against Royal Toronto. He would have a productive sophomore season by finishing as the league's top goal scorer with 17 goals. The eastern Toronto side would secure a playoff berth by finishing fourth in the standings. In the opening round of the playoffs, he contributed two goals against Brantford Galaxy which advanced the club to the semifinals. Ultimately the club would reach the championship final where they were defeated by York Region Shooters.

In his third season with Scarborough, he finished the 2018 campaign as the club's top goal scorer with 10 goals. He also assisted Scarborough in advancing to the championship final for the second consecutive season when he contributed a goal against FC Ukraine United. In the championship final, Stojiljković was present in the match where the eastern Toronto club was defeated in a penalty shootout by FC Vorkuta. The 2019 season marked his fourth year with Scarborough where he was given the team captaincy. For the third consecutive season, he finished as the club's top goal scorer with 13 goals and helped the club secure a postseason berth by finishing as runners-up. In the playoffs, he was featured in the championship final where he contributed two goals against Ukraine United which won the title for Scarborough.

In 2020, he assisted in securing the First Division title the club's first divisional title. He would help the club reach the championship final for the fourth consecutive time where Scarborough faced Vorkuta once more and was defeated by a score of 2-1. He added his second championship title to his name when Scarborough successfully defeated Vorkuta in the 2021 finals. In 2022, he re-signed with Scarborough for his sixth season.

== Honors ==
Scarborough SC

- CSL Championship: 2019
- Canadian Soccer League First Division: 2020

Individual

- CSL Golden Boot: 2017
