= Kiril Dimitrov (footballer) =

Bulgarian footballer

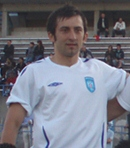
- Dimitrov in 2009

Personal information
- Date of birth: 21 January 1985 (age 41)
- Place of birth: Simitli, Bulgaria
- Height: 5 ft 10 in (1.78 m)
- Position: Midfielder

Senior career*
Years	Team	Apps	(Gls)
2007–2009	Belasitsa Petrich	11	(1)
2009–2013	Serbian White Eagles		
2014	SC Waterloo Region	16	(3)
2015–	Scarborough SC	61	(13)
2018	Unionville Milliken SC	10	(3)
2019	Master's FA	3	(0)
2019	ProStars FC	1	(0)
2019	Aurora FC	5	(0)

Managerial career
- 2015: Scarborough SC (player-coach)
- * Club domestic league appearances and goals

Kiril Dimitrov (Bulgarian: Kирил Димитров; born 21 January 1985) is a Bulgarian former footballer who is the general manager of Scarborough SC in the Canadian Soccer League.

== Playing career ==
Dimitrov began his career in 2004 with Makedonska Slava and later played with PFC Pirin Blagoevgrad and FC Septemvri Simitli. In 2007, he played in the Bulgarian A Football Group with PFC Belasitsa Petrich. He played with the club for two seasons. After Belasitsa was relegated to the Bulgarian B Professional Football Group he went overseas to Canada to sign with the Serbian White Eagles of the Canadian Soccer League. He made his debut for the club on 22 May 2009 in a match against Portugal FC. During his tenure with the White Eagles, he managed to achieve an International division title and reached the CSL Championship finals.

In 2014, he signed with SC Waterloo Region and secured a postseason berth with the club. In 2015, he was appointed a general manager to expansion franchise Scarborough SC. He contributed to the development of the club by serving as a player-coach and negotiating player contracts. In the club's debut season the team finished tenth in the overall standings and missed the final postseason berth by a goal difference.

In 2018, he played in League1 Ontario with Unionville Milliken SC. For the 2019 seasons, he played with Master's FA, ProStars FC and Aurora FC. In 2021, he assisted Scarborough in securing the CSL Championship against FC Vorkuta in the playoffs.

== Honours ==
=== Serbian White Eagles ===
- Canadian Soccer League International Division: 2009
