= BGHC 1 FC =

BGHC 1
- Full name: Brantford Galaxy Hamilton City 1 Football Club
- Founded: 2021
- Dissolved: 2023
- Stadium: Centennial Park Stadium, Toronto, Ontario, Canada
- Capacity: 2,200
- President: Boško Borjan
- Head coach: Saša Vuković
- League: Canadian Soccer League
- 2022: Regular season: 6th Playoffs: Quarterfinals
Home colours	Away colours

BGHC 1 FC was a Canadian soccer team based in Toronto, Ontario. Founded in 2021, it was a member of the Canadian Soccer League.

The club was formed prior to the 2021 season as a merger between Brantford Galaxy and Hamilton City.

== Year-by-year ==
Year	League	Division	GP	W	L	T	Pts	Regular season	Playoffs
2022	CSL	First	10	0	8	2	2	6th	Quarterfinals
