= Scarborough SC =

Canadian association football team

- Full name: Scarborough Soccer Club
- Founded: 2014; 12 years ago
- Stadium: Birchmount Stadium; Scarborough, Ontario
- Capacity: 2,000
- Owner: Angel Belchev
- General manager: Kiril Dimitrov
- Head coach: Kiril Dimitrov
- League: Canadian Soccer League
- 2025: Regular season: 1st Playoffs: Champions
Home colours	Away colours

Scarborough SC is a Canadian soccer team founded in 2014. The team is currently a member of the Canadian Soccer League. The team plays home games out of Birchmount Stadium in the district of Scarborough, Toronto, Ontario. The team's colours are green, and black.

== History ==
Scarborough SC was formed in 2014 as an expansion franchise in the Canadian Soccer League. Marking the return of CSL soccer to Scarborough, Toronto since 2007 when the Canadian Lions held the territorial rights. Team owner Angel Belchev hired the services of CSL veteran Kiril Dimitrov to recruit players, and assumed the duties of general manager, and as head coach/player. He brought in several players with European experience including CSL veterans. Overseas recruitment consisted of Dobrin Orlovski, Tihomir Kosturkov, Mladen Kukrika, and Aleksandar Malbasic. Several players were acquired from North York Astros like Joey Melo, Gabe Gala, Boris Miličić, Mark Jankovic, Jason Lopes, Jose Goncalves De Sousa, and Ricardo Munguía Pérez.

The club's first home venue was located at Downsview Park. In their debut season, the club finished tenth in the overall standings missing the final postseason spot by a goal difference. De Sousa finished as the club's top goalscorer with 15 goals. In preparations for the 2016 season, the club moved their home venue to Birchmount Stadium, and appointed Ricardo Munguia Perez as the new head coach. Perez's notable acquisitions were Canadian international Adrian Cann, Aleksandar Stojiljković, Adis Hasecic, Nemanja Simeunovic, Alon Badat, and Metodi Iliev. The 2016 season marked the first time Scarborough qualified for the postseason by finishing third, and posting the third best defensive record. Their playoff run was cut short after a 3–0 defeat to Hamilton City SC.

In 2019, the team secured the CSL Championship after defeating FC Ukraine United.

== Roster ==
As of July 21, 2025

Note: Flags indicate national team as defined under FIFA eligibility rules; some limited exceptions apply. Players may hold more than one non-FIFA nationality.

No.	Pos.	Nation	Player
—	DF	SSD	Edmond Amadeo
—	DF		Francisco Calderon
—	FW	CHI	Gonzalo Matias Cabrera Celis
—	DF	MEX	Jesús Compeán
—	FW		Santiago Currios
—	FW		Jair Cruz
—	MF	SRB	Petar Đorđević
—	MF		Mohamed El Sabahy
—	MF	JAM	Devroy Grey
—	MF		Alex Gustavo
—	DF	MEX	Marco Johansen
—	MF		Edgar Lopez

No.	Pos.	Nation	Player
—	GK	CAN	Christian Maraldo
—	MF	CAF	Moussa Limane
—	MF	SRB	Marko Prokić
—	MF	JAM	Camaal Reid
—	DF	JAM	Odain Simpson
—	MF		Danil Rodin
—	MF	CUB	Andy Baquero
—	FW		Junior Santana
—	GK	MEX	José Rodolfo Toledo Ríos
—	DF		Ramses Torrijos
—	MF		Amador Torres Castillo
—	MF		Mishel Vissuet

== Head coaches ==
Scarborough SC

- Kiril Dimitrov (2015)
- Ricardo Munguía (2016)
- Krum Bibishkov (2017)
- Zoran Rajović (2018–2020)
- Mirko Medić (2021–2023)
- Zoran Knežević (2023–2025)
- Kiril Dimitrov (2025–)

Scarborough SC II

- Eddy Coronel (2018)

== Honours ==
- CSL Championship: 2019, 2021, 2025, 2026
- CSL Championship runner-up: 2017, 2018, 2020, 2022
- Canadian Soccer League First Division/Regular Season: 2020, 2023, 2025
- Canadian Soccer League First Division/Regular Season runner-up: 2019, 2021, 2024
- ProSound Cup runner-up: 2021
- Royal CSL Cup runner-up: 2024, 2025

== Seasons ==
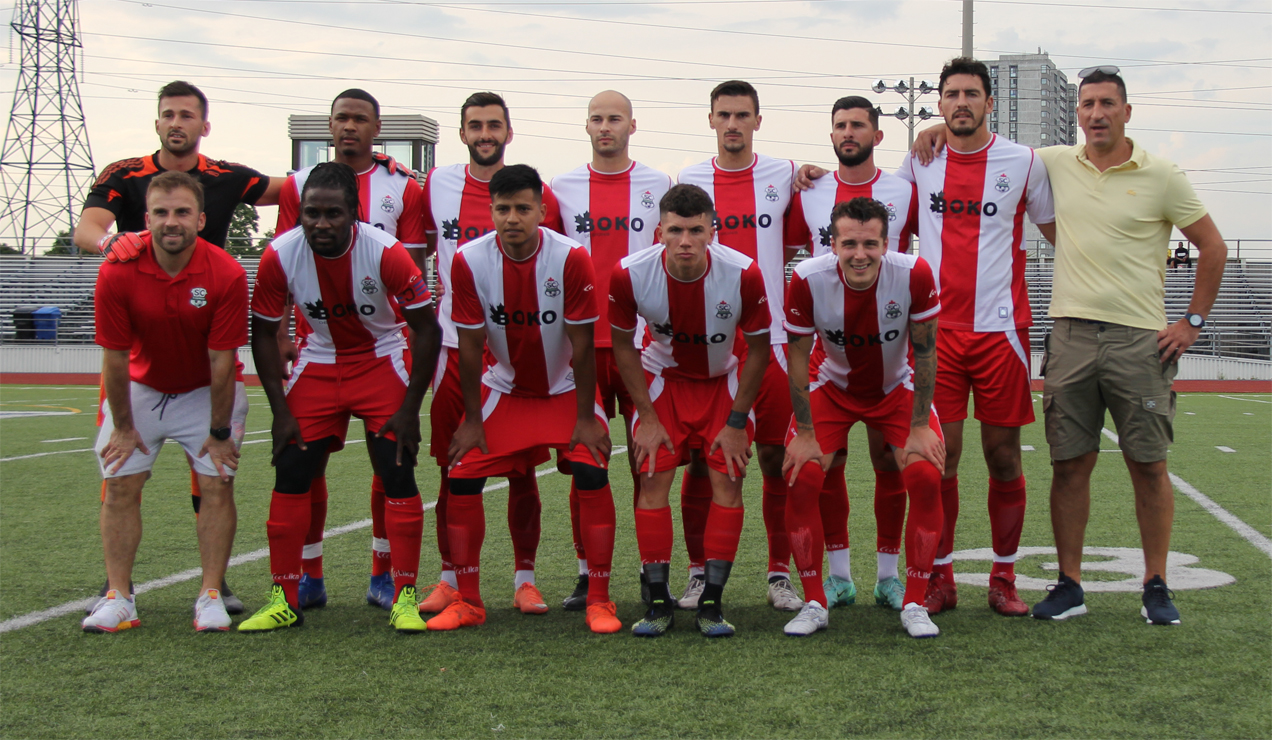
Scarborough SC in 2022

=== First team ===
Season	League	Teams	Record	Rank	Playoffs	Ref
2015	Canadian Soccer League (First Division)	12	6–8–8	10th	did not qualify	
2016	Canadian Soccer League (First Division)	8	9–4–8	3rd	Quarterfinals	
2017	Canadian Soccer League (First Division)	8	7–3–4	4th	Finals	
2018	Canadian Soccer League (First Division)	9	8–5–3	4th	Finals	
2019	Canadian Soccer League (First Division)	10	12–3–3	2nd	Champions	
2020	Canadian Soccer League (First Division)	5	5–0–3	1st	Finals	
2021	Canadian Soccer League	8	5–2–0	2nd	Champions	
2022	Canadian Soccer League	6	4–5–1	3rd	Finals	
2023	Canadian Soccer League	7	9–1–2	1st	–	
2024	Canadian Soccer League	6	8–2–2	2nd	–	
2025	Canadian Soccer League	4	7–1–1	1st	Champions	
2026	Canadian Soccer League	2	–	–	Champions	

=== Second team ===
Season	League	Teams	Record	Rank	Playoffs	Ref
2018	Canadian Soccer League (Second Division)	6	8–0–7	3rd	Semifinals	

== Notable players ==
- (Canada) Adrian Cann
- (Canada) Gabe Gala
- (Canada) Taha Ilyass
- (Canada) Joey Melo
- (Canada) Jordan Webb
- (Bosnia and Herzegovina) Miloš Đurković
- (Bosnia and Herzegovina) Haris Fazlagić
- (Bosnia and Herzegovina) Adis Hasečić
- (Bosnia and Herzegovina) Mladen Kukrika
- (Bosnia and Herzegovina) Aleksandar Malbašić
- (Bosnia and Herzegovina) Petar Vukadin
- (Bulgaria) Krum Bibishkov
- (Bulgaria) Kiril Dimitrov
- (Bulgaria) Metodi Iliev
- (Bulgaria) Zdravko Karadachki
- (Bulgaria) Tihomir Kosturkov
- (Bulgaria) Dobrin Orlovski
- (Central African Republic) Moussa Limane
- (Chile) Jaime Grondona
- (Cuba) Andy Baquero
- (Cuba) Yordan Santa Cruz
- (Guyana) Ryan Khedoo
- (Jamaica) Shaqueil Bradford
- (Jamaica) Kavin Bryan
- (Jamaica) Odain Simpson
- (Jamaica) Marvin Morgan Jr.
- (Jamaica) Camaal Reid
- (Mexico) Jesús Compeán
- (Mexico) Daniel González
- (Mexico) Ricardo Munguía
- (Serbia) Zoran Knežević
- (Serbia) Boris Miličić
- (Serbia) Zoran Rajović
- (Serbia) Aleksandar Stojiljković
- (Serbia) Vladimir Zelenbaba
- (Serbia) Bojan Zoranović
- (Sierra Leone) John Trye
