= Hamilton City SC =

Canadian association football team

Hamilton City 1
- Full name: Hamilton City 1 Soccer Club
- Founded: 2016
- Dissolved: 2024
- Stadium: Heritage Field; Hamilton, Ontario
- Manager: Kathleen Nurse
- Coach: Saša Vuković
- League: Canadian Soccer League
- 2024: Regular season: 5th Playoffs: Did not qualify
Home colours	Away colours

Hamilton City 1 Soccer Club was a Canadian soccer team founded in 2016 that played in the Canadian Soccer League, and played their home games at Cardinal Newman Secondary School multi-sport athletic field in the community of Stoney Creek, Hamilton. In 2021, they merged with fellow CSL club Brantford Galaxy to form BGH City FC.

== History ==
Original team logo

In May 2016, Andrew Crowe, the owner of London City, sold his share to his partner Zoran Kliseric, and relocated the club to Hamilton, Ontario marking the return of professional soccer to the city since Hamilton Croatia competed in the Canadian Soccer League in 2010. The organizations territory was located at Stoney Creek with Cardinal Newman Secondary School multi-sport athletic field as their home venue. Former London City manager Josip Dzale assumed the responsibilities of head coach, and assembled a roster of players with European and CSL experience. Dzale brought in Dražen Vuković, Nikola Stanojević, Josip Keran, Miroslav Čabrilo, Igor Krmar, Haris Fazlagić, and Zdenko Jurcevic.

Hamilton City made its league debut on May 27, 2016 against Milton SC, where Santiago Pestrepo scored the club's first historic goal in a 2-1 defeat. Hamilton secured a postseason berth by finishing sixth in the standings. In the first round of the playoffs they faced Scarborough SC, where Hamilton advanced to the next round by a score of 3-0 with goals coming from Timotej Zakrajsek, Jurcevic, and Frane Grbesa. Hamilton faced the regular league champions York Region Shooters and reached the CSL Championship final after a 4-1 victory in a penalty shootout. Their opponents in the final were the Serbian White Eagles, where Domagoj Zubac recorded the first goal with Serbia tying the match later and scoring the final goal at the last minutes of the match to win the championship. On February 20, 2017 it was announced that the owners of Hamilton SC decided not to field a team for the 2017 season.

After a one-year hiatus, Hamilton returned for the 2018 season. After a third place finish during the 2020 season, they were disqualified from the playoffs for being "Not-in-Good Standing" at the conclusion of the season.

Ahead of the 2021 season, they merged with Brantford Galaxy to form BGH City FC. After the 2024 season, the club ceased operations.

== Roster ==
As of July 24, 2024

Note: Flags indicate national team as defined under FIFA eligibility rules; some limited exceptions apply. Players may hold more than one non-FIFA nationality.

No.	Pos.	Nation	Player
—	DF	SRB	Dragan Antanasijević
—	DF		Sava Arsić
—	GK		Stefan Avramovic
—	MF		Nemanja Backovic
—	MF	CAN	Donart Beqiri
—	FW	SRB	Aleksandar Božović
—	MF	CAN	Miroslav Cabrilo
—	MF	MNE	Nebojša Ćetković
—	DF	SRB	Nikola Gavrilovic
—	DF		Luka Jankovic
—	DF		Nemanja Jolic
—	FW	SRB	Vukasin Kovacevic
—	MF	SRB	Nemanja Jankovic

No.	Pos.	Nation	Player
—	DF	MNE	Aleksandar Davidovic
—	DF		Aleksandar Lasic
—	FW	CAN	Aleksa Marković
—	DF		Janko Milosevic
—	MF	MNE	Miljan Milovic
—	GK	MNE	Aleksandar Nikolic
—	DF		Tomislav Pinjuh
—	FW	CAN	Arsen Platis
—	DF		Danilo Simic
—	MF	BIH	Saša Vidović
—	DF	BIH	Uroš Vidović
—	DF	SRB	Đorđe Vukobrat
—	MF		Miloš Vuruna

== Head coaches ==
- Josip Dzale (2016)
- Saša Vuković (2018–2020)
- Saša Vuković (2023)
- Radoš Batizić & Zdravko Lalatovic (2024–)

== Honours ==
- CSL Championship runner-up: 2016

== Seasons ==
=== First team ===
Season	League	Teams	Record	Rank	Playoffs	Ref
2016	Canadian Soccer League (First Division)	8	6–5–10	6th	Finals	
2018	Canadian Soccer League (First Division)	9	8–1–7	5th	Quarterfinals	
2019	Canadian Soccer League (First Division)	10	6–3–9	6th	Quarterfinals	
2020	Canadian Soccer League (First Division)	5	4–2–2	3rd	did not qualify	
2023	Canadian Soccer League	7	5–1–6	5th	–	
2024	Canadian Soccer League	6	2–1–9	5th	–	

=== Second team ===
Season	League	Teams	Record	Rank	Playoffs	Ref
2019	Canadian Soccer League (Second Division)	6	3–4–8	5th	Semifinals	
