= Brantford Galaxy =

Canadian association football team

- Full name: Brantford Galaxy Soccer Club
- Nickname: Galaxy
- Short name: Brantford Galaxy
- Founded: February 24, 2010; 16 years ago
- Dissolved: 2021 (merged with Hamilton City)
- Stadium: Heritage Field; Hamilton, Ontario
- Capacity: 2,000+
- President: Boško Borjan
- Head coach: Saša Vidović
- League: Canadian Soccer League
- 2020: Regular season: 5th Playoffs: Did not qualify
- Website: http://www.brantfordgalaxy.ca/
Home colours	Away colours

Brantford Galaxy Soccer Club was a semi-professional Canadian soccer club based in Brantford, Ontario, Canada, with their home venue located in Hamilton, Ontario at the Heritage Field Turf. The club competes in the Canadian Soccer League, a league not sanctioned by a FIFA-recognized body. The Galaxy were formed in 2010 as an expansion franchise. In their first season Brantford recorded a milestone by becoming the first expansion franchise in CSL history to claim a CSL Championship in their debut season. After their championship season the club faced several problems ranging from change of ownership, to philosophical differences within team management...

The ownership in 2013 decided to take a year of absence in order to regroup. In late 2014, former head coach Tomo Dančetović spearheaded the relaunching of the club by acquiring the name and franchise rights from the old ownership, and the Galaxy returned to the league to participate in the 2015 season. In 2021, they merged with Hamilton City to form BGH City.

== History ==
Brantford Galaxy SC was announced as an expansion franchise in the Canadian Soccer League's 2010 season on February 24, 2010. Bosko Borjan, Gerry Crnic along with European investors were primarily responsible for returning professional soccer to the city since the 1930s/1940s where several Brantford clubs competed in the Canadian National Soccer League. Lions Park located at Steve Brown Sports Complex was announced as the Galaxy's home venue after receiving CSL approval. Lazo Džepina was appointed the club's first head coach and assembled a roster with a majority of imports from Europe with several local talent. The notable acquisitions for the 2010 season were Miodrag Anđelković, Ranko Golijanin, Patrick Gerhardt, Patryk Misik, Haris Fazlagić, Nenad Begović, Dražen Gović, Zoran Roglić, Drazen Vukovic, and Marco Giusti was named the club captain.

Brantford made their debut on May 16, 2010 in a well-attended crowd against Portugal FC which resulted in a 3-3 draw with goals coming from Golijanin, Andelkovic, and Vukovic. Brantford clinched a postseason berth by finishing seventh in the overall standings and recording the third best offensive record. In the first round of the playoffs their opponents were the Serbian White Eagles, and advanced to the semi-finals by defeating the White Eagles by a score of 1-0 with the lone goal from Zvonko Bakula. In the second round the Galaxy faced Portugal FC and won the match by a score of 5-3 with Golijanin recording a hat trick, and the rest coming from Andelkovic, and Kyle Grootenboer. In the CSL Championship final at the Centennial Park Stadium in Toronto, the club faced Hamilton Croatia, and with goals coming from Fazlagic, and Golijanin the Galaxy claimed their first championship by a score of 3-0. At the conclusion of the season, Jesse Castillo received the CSL Reserve Division Goalkeeper of the Year award.

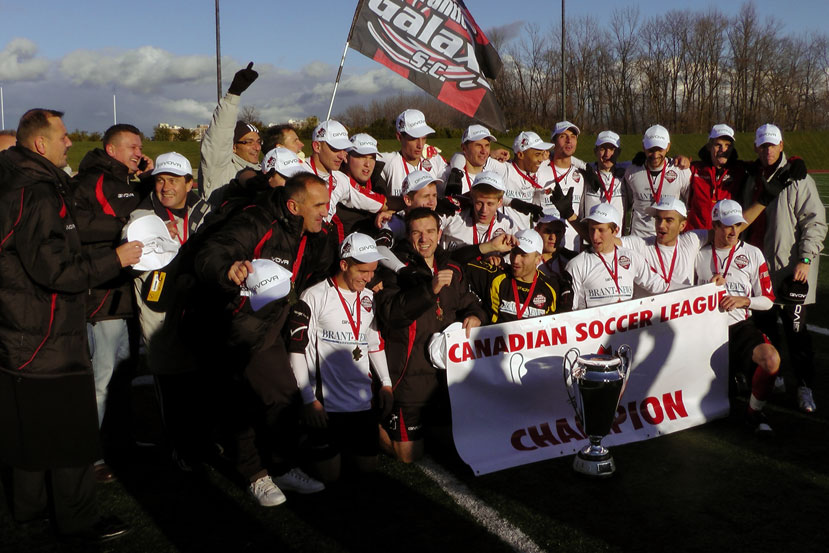
Brantford Galaxy celebrating their 2010 CSL Championship.

In preparations for the 2011 season, Brantford's feeder club the Brantford Inter-City Soccer club announced that it will change its name to the Brantford Galaxy Youth Soccer Club in an effort to further align it with the CSL club. After the departure of several key players, head coach Džepina brought in imports from the former Yugoslavian countries, and appointed Golijanin as the team captain. His notable signings included Chilean international Cristián Gómez, Rade Novković, Dalibor Mitrović, Saša Vidović, Vladimir Markotić, and Ferid Idrizovic. On July 9, 2011, after a string of poor performances, Džepina was sacked as head coach to be replaced by assistant coach Tomo Dančetović. Dančetović managed to achieve better results, but unfortunately the Galaxy failed to clinch the final postseason berth by finishing ninth in the overall standings.

The following season, Brantford saw a change in the ownership with Borjan and Crnic becoming sole owners after losing their European backers resulting in a smaller budget, and further reliance on community support. The organization hired the services of Ron Davidson a CSL Coach of the Year with Hamilton Croatia in 2010. Davidson reduced the amount of European imports by signing several local and Greater Toronto Area players. The notable additions to the roster were Dave Simpson, Preston Corporal, Logan Alexander, Jeremy Shepherd, Melford James Jr, and Damion Scott. Midway through the season, Davidson managed an 8-3 record and a fourth-place position, but despite his impressive run he was sacked from his position due to ideological differences with the club's administration. In protest to the dismissal, the Galaxy lost eight players who were in solidarity with Davidson. Tomo Dančetović was once more appointed to the position on an interim basis with Golijanin returning to serve as assistant coach. Disaster struck Brantford as they lost seven of their remaining matches and tied one and failed for the second straight season in securing a postseason berth by finishing thirteenth in the standings.

On April 1, 2013, Brantford announced a year of absence in order to regroup. On December 30, 2014, with Brantford's franchise rights about to expire Tomo Dančetović assisted with volunteers Andrew Pilkington and Jim Turnbull acquired the name and franchise rights from the old ownership and reinstated the club for the 2015 season. Dančetović brought in several imports from Europe and domestic players which included Luka Bešenić, Haris Redžepi, Stefan Vukovic, Zdenko Jurčević, Dejan Ristić, Aleksa Marković, and Boris Miličić. On October 4, 2015, the Galaxy faced Milton SC the final match of the season. The game was significant because the victor would secure the final postseason berth, unfortunately for Brantford they suffered a 4-3 defeat. At the CSL awards banquet, Brantford's reserve team won several awards like Nikola Miokovic winning the CSL Golden Boot, Arsenije Japalak the MVP, Namanjar Sudar the Defender of the Year, and Zach Kingma with the Rookie of the Year award.

In preparations for the 2016 season, Dančetović retained the majority of the roster with Bojan Stepanović, Krum Bibishkov, and Nenad Nikolić as the notable additions to the roster. Throughout the regular season, Brantford clinched their first postseason berth since the 2010 season by finishing seventh in the standings. Their opponents in the playoffs were FC Ukraine United, but were eliminated by a score of 3–0.

Ahead of the 2021 season, they merged with Hamilton City SC to form BGH City FC.

== Head coaches ==
Years	Name	Nation
2010–2011	Lazo Džepina	Croatia
2011	Tomo Dančetović	Serbia
2012	Ron Davidson	Canada
2012-2016	Tomo Dančetović	Serbia
2017	Saša Vuković	Serbia
2017-	Aleksandar Pešić	Serbia
2018-2020	Milan Prpa	Serbia
2020-	Saša Vidović	Bosnia and Herzegovina

== Honours ==
- CSL Championship: 2010

== Seasons ==
=== First team ===
Season	League	Teams	Record	Rank	Playoffs	Ref
2010	Canadian Soccer League (First Division)	13	9–5–10	7th	Champions	
2011	Canadian Soccer League (First Division)	14	9–3–14	9th	did not qualify	
2012	Canadian Soccer League (First Division)	16	8–1–13	13th	did not qualify	
2015	Canadian Soccer League (First Division)	12	7–3–12	11th	did not qualify	
2016	Canadian Soccer League (First Division)	8	3–9–9	7th	Quarterfinals	
2017	Canadian Soccer League (First Division)	8	6–0–8	5th	Quarterfinals	
2018	Canadian Soccer League (First Division)	9	3–2–11	8th	Quarterfinals	
2019	Canadian Soccer League (First Division)	10	2–2–14	10th	did not qualify	
2020	Canadian Soccer League (First Division)	5	1–0–7	5th	did not qualify	

=== Second team ===
Season	League	Teams	Record	Rank	Playoffs	Ref
2010	Canadian Soccer League (Second Division)	11	10–2–3	2nd	Quarterfinals	
2011	Canadian Soccer League (Second Division)	7	9–1–8	3rd		
2012	Canadian Soccer League (Second Division)	12	1–0–15	12th	did not qualify	
2015	Canadian Soccer League (Second Division)	10	9–1–8	5th	Semifinals	
2016	Canadian Soccer League (Second Division)	8	8–2–4	3rd	Semifinals	
2017	Canadian Soccer League (Second Division)	8	7–1–6	4th	Semifinals	
2018	Canadian Soccer League (Second Division)	6	5–1–9	5th	did not qualify	
2019	Canadian Soccer League (Second Division)	6	3–3–9	6th	Quarterfinals	

== See also ==
- 2018 Brantford Galaxy season
- 2017 Brantford Galaxy season
