= 2013 York Region Shooters season =

York Region Shooters
2013 season
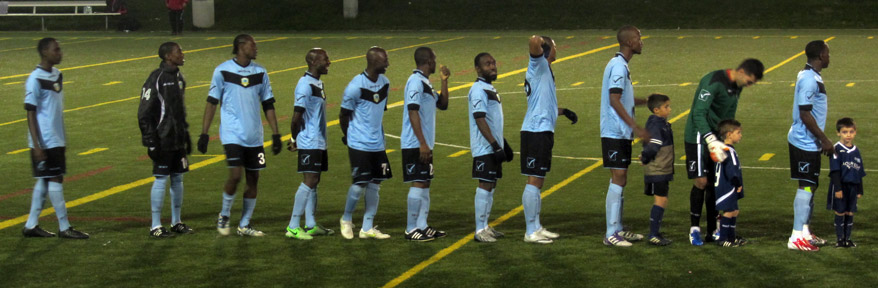
- York Region Shooters line-up before the quarterfinal match at St. Joan Of Arc Turf Field, October 2013
- Chairman: Tony De Thomasis
- Manager: John Pacione
- Canadian Soccer League: 2nd place (First Division)
- CSL Championship: Quarterfinal
- Top goalscorer: Richard West (19)
Home colours	Away colours

The 2013 season was York Region Shooters's 16th season in the Canadian Soccer League. The club returned to the top four by finishing second in the First Division, and finished in the top four with the best offensive, and defensive record. The organization qualified for the playoffs for the 11th consecutive season, but saw an early departure in the preliminary round. Their reserve side managed to also play in the postseason by finishing seventh in the Second Division. Their playoff journey began with victory in the opening round, but were eliminated in the following round. The club`s top goalscorer was Richard West with 19 goals who managed to end Kadian Lecky`s seven year streak.

== Summary ==
In the off season a dispute occurred between the Canadian Soccer League, and the Canadian Soccer Association (CSA) after the CSA unexpectedly removed sanctioning to the CSL just months before kickoff. The issue was resolved after the CSL appealed to the Sport Dispute Resolution Centre of Canada (SDRCC), where the sport arbitrator forced the governing body to reinstate sanctioning to the CSL for another season. Meanwhile York Region made preparations for the 2013 season by assigning longtime team manager John Pacione with head coach responsibilities. Pacione assembled a roster with a mixture of imports with International and European experience along with Vaughan`s traditional veteran core players. In the initial stages of the season the club experienced a slight delay in performance, but quickly rebounded with an eight match undefeated streak. The team managed another undefeated streak with five matches, and concluded the regular season as runner`s up in the First Division.

Throughout the season York Region posted the second best defensive record, and the third best offensive record. The club also produced another solid home field performance by only losing two matches at home. In the postseason the Shooters were eliminated from the tournament in the opening round to London City SC in a penalty shootout. In the Second Division the reserve team was managed by league veteran Sam Medeiros, where they managed to secure a playoff berth by finishing seventh in the standings. In the preliminary round they defeated Niagara United B, but were knocked out by Toronto Croatia B in the semifinals.

York Region also formed a partnership with Empoli F.C. through the Italian Soccer Management, which provides opportunities for camps and scouting of players.

== Club ==
=== Management ===
Position	Staff
Head coach	John Pacione
Assistant coach	Americo Tantalo
Assistant coach	Pat Montalto
Manager	John Pacione
Assistant and Second Division manager	Tony Crispo
Second Division Head coach	Sam Medeiros
Second Division Assistant coach	Kostas Zorbas
Massage Therapist	Eric Yuill
Medical staff	Roger Menta

Last updated: November 14, 2013

=== First Division roster ===
As of November 14, 2013.

Note: Flags indicate national team as defined under FIFA eligibility rules; some limited exceptions apply. Players may hold more than one non-FIFA nationality.

No.	Pos.	Nation	Player
-	GK	ITA	Emanuelle Ameltonis
-	DF		Moses Atule
-	DF		Diego Benzi
-	GK	CHI	Camilo Benzi
-	DF	CAN	Marcelo Capazolo
-	DF	CAN	Fitzroy Christie
-	FW	CAN	Jason De Thomasis
-	DF	CAN	Ryan Dummett
-	MF		Ramos Reis Eder-Eurenco
-	MF	JAM	Richard Edwards
-	DF	CAN	Dino Gardner
-	MF	SKN	Darryl Gomez
-	DF		Ali Hanam
-	DF	JAM	Ricky Herron
-	GK	JPN	Yasuto Hoshiko
-	DF	CAN	Desmond Humphrey

No.	Pos.	Nation	Player
-	GK	CAN	Adrian Ibanez
-	FW	CAN	Tristan Jackman
-	DF	CAN	Jurgen Kela
-	DF	CAN	Gerard Ladiyou
-	FW	CAN	Kadian Lecky
-	MF	ARG	Diego Hernan Maradona
-	MF		Nico Martinez
-	DF	DOM	Wilson Martínez
-	MF	CAN	Matthew O'Connor
-	MF		Mario Orestano
-	MF	ESP	Xavi Pérez
-	MF	CAN	Matthew Rios
-	MF	CAN	Carlos Rivas
-	DF		Andre Stewart
-	MF	CAN	Alex Trujillo
-	FW	JAM	Richard West

=== Second Division roster ===
As of September 30, 2013

Note: Flags indicate national team as defined under FIFA eligibility rules; some limited exceptions apply. Players may hold more than one non-FIFA nationality.

No.	Pos.	Nation	Player
-	-		Adeyinka Abdy Basit
-	-		Francesco Crispo
-	DF	CAN	Andrew Curci
-	FW	ITA	Nicola Di Sanza
-	MF	CAN	Dino Gardner
-	-		Nikolaus Giannotta
-	FW	CAN	Tristan Jackman
-	GK	CAN	Adam Majer
-	-		Stephen Mason
-	-		John Mastromarco
-	-		Sargon Mate
-	DF	CAN	Duncan Mitchell
-	-		Simone Orlandi

No.	Pos.	Nation	Player
-	-		Daniel Peterson
-	MF	GRN	Ricky Sayers
-	-		Shezan Singh
-	DF	CAN	Justin Soscia
-	-		Marcelo Tantalo
-	-		Yonnik Thompson
-	MF	CAN	Jon-Michael Vieira
-	-		Prasanth Vigneswararajah
-	MF	CAN	Arun Vigneswararajah
-	-		Juan Antonio Vivas
-	-		Andre Windross
-	MF	CAN	Xavier Wright

=== In ===
No.	Pos.	Player	Transferred from	Fee/notes	Source
	FW	(Italy) Nicola Di Sanza	(Italy) A.S.D. Real Metapontino	Free Transfer	
	MF	(Jamaica) Richard Edwards	(Jamaica) Harbour View F.C.	Free Transfer	
	MF	(Canada) Dino Gardner	(Canada) FC Edmonton	Free Transfer	
	GK	(Japan) Yasuto Hoshiko	(Hungary) BKV Előre SC	Free Transfer	
	DF	(Canada) Gerard Ladiyou	(Canada) SC Toronto	Free Transfer	
	MF	(Argentina) Diego Hernan Maradona	(Argentina) Atlético Camioneros	Free Transfer	
	DF	(Dominican Republic) Wilson Martínez	(Dominican Republic) Moca FC	Free Transfer	
	MF	(Spain) Xavi Pérez	(Indonesia) Pro Duta F.C.	Free Transfer	
	MF	(Canada) Matthew Rios	(Canada) Toronto Croatia	Free Transfer	
	FW	(Jamaica) Richard West	(Canada) Serbian White Eagles	Free Transfer	

=== Out ===
No.	Pos.	Player	Transferred to	Fee/notes	Source
19	DF	(Bermuda) Taurean Manders	(United States) Antigua Barracuda FC	Free Transfer	

== Competitions summary ==
=== First division ===
Pos	Team	Pld	W	D	L	GF	GA	GD	Pts	Qualification
1	Kingston FC (C)	22	16	2	4	69	30	+39	50	Qualification for Playoffs
2	York Region Shooters	22	15	2	5	47	22	+25	47	Qualification for Playoffs
3	Toronto Croatia	22	14	5	3	48	21	+27	47	Qualification for Playoffs
4	Brampton United	22	13	1	8	43	36	+7	40	Qualification for Playoffs
5	SC Waterloo Region (O)	22	11	4	7	52	33	+19	37	Qualification for Playoffs
6	Windsor Stars	22	8	3	11	37	40	−3	27	Qualification for Playoffs
7	London City	22	8	3	11	39	48	−9	27	Qualification for Playoffs
8	Serbian White Eagles	22	8	2	12	30	36	−6	26	Qualification for Playoffs
9	Astros Vasas FC	22	7	4	11	29	48	−19	25	
10	Burlington SC	22	7	0	15	34	56	−22	21	
11	St. Catharines Wolves	22	7	0	15	22	53	−31	21	
12	Niagara United	22	3	4	15	27	54	−27	13	

Source: []
Rules for classification: 1) points; 2) goal difference; 3) number of goals scored.
(C) Champions; (O) Play-off winners

==== Results summary ====
Overall								Home						Away					
Pld	W	D	L	GF	GA	GD	Pts	W	D	L	GF	GA	GD	W	D	L	GF	GA	GD
22	15	2	5	47	22	+25	47	9	0	2	27	6	+21	6	2	3	20	16	+4

Last updated: October 7, 2013.
Source: 2013 Canadian Soccer League season

==== Results by round ====
Round	1	2	3	4	5	6	7	8	9	10	11	12	13	14	15	16	17	18	19	20	21	22
Ground	H	A	H	H	A	H	A	A	H	A	H	H	A	H	H	A	H	A	A	A	A	H
Result	W	D	L	L	W	W	W	W	W	W	W	W	L	W	W	W	W	W	L	D	L	W

Source: Regular season matches
A = Away; H = Home; W = Win; D = Draw; L = Loss

==== Matches ====
May 12, 2013	York Region Shooters	1–0	Astros Vasas FC	Vaughan, Ontario
18:30	Gardner 91'	Report		Stadium: St. Joan Of Arc Turf Field

May 24, 2013	London City SC	2–2	York Region Shooters	London, Ontario
20:30	Aldin Kukic 37'; Gent Miftari 90'	Report	Nicolas Martinez 44'; West 83'	Stadium: Hellenic Centre; Referee: Matt McCready (OSA)

May 26, 2013	York Region Shooters	0–1	Serbian White Eagles	Vaughan, Ontario
18:30		Report; Report	Djorjije Strunjas 77'	Stadium: St. Joan Of Arc Turf Field

June 2, 2013	York Region Shooters	1–2	Brampton City United	Vaughan, Ontario
18:30	West 45'	Report	Nunes 53'; Milos Scepanovic 59'	Stadium: St. Joan Of Arc Turf Field

June 8, 2013	Niagara United	1–2	York Region Shooters	Niagara Falls, Ontario
19:00	Corporal 56'	Report; Report	Kadian Lecky 19'; West 72'	Stadium: Kalar Sports Park; Referee: Alexis Vaughan (OSA)

June 16, 2013	York Region Shooters	6–1	St. Catharines Roma Wolves	Vaughan, Ontario
18:30		Report		Stadium: St. Joan Of Arc Turf Field

June 23, 2013	Astros Vasas FC	0–4	York Region Shooters	Toronto, Ontario
16:30		Report	West 35', 48'; Ali Hamam 78'; Matthew Rios 87'	Stadium: Esther Shiner Stadium

July 5, 2013	Serbian White Eagles	1–2	York Region Shooters	Toronto, Ontario
21:00	Ramon Bailey 40'	Report	West 21'; Matthew Rios 46'	Stadium: Centennial Park Stadium; Attendance: 100; Referee: Jeff Fearnall (OSA)

July 7, 2013	York Region Shooters	3–0	Windsor Stars	Vaughan, Ontario
19:30	West 55'; Ali Hanam 60'; Ryan Dummett 86'	Report		Stadium: St. Joan Of Arc Turf Field; Attendance: 80; Referee: Manuel Orellana (OSA)

July 14, 2013	Burlington SC	0–3	York Region Shooters	Burlington, Ontario
19:00		Report	Ali Hamam 36'; Desmond Humphrey 67'; West 85'	Stadium: Nelson Stadium; Referee: Justin Tasev (OSA)

July 21, 2013	York Region Shooters	2–0	Toronto Croatia	Vaughan, Ontario
18:30	Ali Hanam 18'; West	Report		Stadium: St. Joan Of Arc Turf Field; Referee: Arthur Korbiel (OSA)

July 28, 2013	York Region Shooters	1–0	SC Waterloo Region	Vaughan, Ontario
18:30	Ali Hanam 65'	Report; Report		Stadium: St. Joan Of Arc Turf Field; Attendance: 100; Referee: Ramee Arbaji (OSA)

August 11, 2013	Windsor Stars	1–0	York Region Shooters	Windsor, Ontario
19:00	Wade Allen 9'	Report		Stadium: Windsor Stadium

August 18, 2013	York Region Shooters	4–1	Burlington SC	Vaughan, Ontario
18:30	Ryan Dummett 15'; Pérez 72', 82'; Kadian Lecky 84'	Report; Report	Lindsay 34'	Stadium: St. Joan Of Arc Turf Field

August 25, 2013	York Region Shooters	3–0	London City SC	Vaughan, Ontario
18:30	Kadian Lecky 36'; Pérez 40'; Tristan Jackman 49'	Report		Stadium: St. Joan Of Arc Turf Field; Attendance: 100; Referee: Armando Pereira (OSA)

September 8, 2013	Brampton City United	2–3	York Region Shooters	Brampton, Ontario
16:30	Stephen Mark Hall 44'; Milos Scepanovic 75'	Report	West 19', 53', 81'	Stadium: Victoria Park Stadium; Referee: Pierre Acouri (OSA)

September 15, 2013	York Region Shooters	5–1	Niagara United	Vaughan, Ontario
18:30	West 16', 42'; Mario Orestano 66'; Kadian Lecky 92', 93'	Report	Anthony Mermigas 82'	Stadium: St. Joan Of Arc Turf Field; Attendance: 40; Referee: Hassane Rifai (OSA)

September 18, 2013	St. Catharines Roma Wolves	0–1	York Region Shooters	St. Catharines, Ontario
20:00		Report	Kadian Lecky 83'	Stadium: Club Roma Stadium; Referee: David Di Pasquale (OSA)

September 22, 2013	Kingston FC	2–1	York Region Shooters	Kingston, Ontario
13:00	Lichioiu; Guillaume Surot 86'	Report	West 44'	Stadium: Queens West Field

September 29, 2013	Toronto Croatia	2–2	York Region Shooters	Mississauga, Ontario
21:00	Prgomet 17'; Tihomir Maletic 63'	Report	Gerard Ladiyou 5'; West 86'	Stadium: Hershey Fields; Attendance: 150; Referee: Scott Decker (OSA)

October 2, 2013	SC Waterloo Region	5–0	York Region Shooters	Waterloo, Ontario
21:00	Dado Hadrovic 35'; David Muir 38'; Zelenbaba 47'; Harris Fazlagic 65'; Adis Hasecic 82'	Report		Stadium: Warrior Field

October 6, 2013	York Region Shooters	1–0	Kingston FC	Vaughan, Ontario
18:30	Pérez 9'	Report; Report		Stadium: St. Joan Of Arc Turf Field; Attendance: 80; Referee: David Barrie (OSA)

==== Postseason ====
October 11, 2013 Quarterfinal	York Region Shooters	1–1 (a.e.t.) (2–4 p)	London City SC	Vaughan, Ontario
20:00	Mario Orestano 119'	Report	Aldin Kukic 109'	Stadium: St. Joan Of Arc Turf Field; Attendance: 120; Referee: Manuel Orellano (OSA)
	Penalties
	Pérez (penalty missed); Gardner (penalty scored); Fitzroy Christie (penalty missed); Gomez (penalty scored)		Marin Vucemilovic Grgic (penalty scored); Pirija (penalty scored); Vukomanovic (penalty scored); Younan Samra (penalty scored)

=== Second division ===
Pos	Team	Pld	W	D	L	GF	GA	GD	Pts	Qualification
1	Toronto Croatia B (A)	16	9	3	4	37	27	+10	30	Playoffs
2	Niagara United B (A)	16	8	5	3	40	30	+10	29	Playoffs
3	London City B (A)	16	9	1	6	39	25	+14	28	Playoffs
4	St. Catharines Wolves B (A)	16	8	2	6	33	33	0	26	Playoffs
5	Brampton United B (A)	16	7	4	5	31	20	+11	25	Playoffs
6	SC Waterloo Region B (A)	16	6	3	7	23	30	−7	21	Playoffs
7	York Region Shooters B (A)	16	5	5	6	29	26	+3	20	Playoffs
8	Kingston FC B (A)	16	5	2	9	32	42	−10	17	Playoffs
9	Serbian White Eagles B	16	2	1	13	16	46	−30	7	

Updated to match(es) played on October 7, 2013. Source: http://canadiansoccerleague.com/schedules/res_standings.htm
Rules for classification: 1) points; 2) goal difference; 3) number of goals scored.
(A) Advance to a further round

== Statistics ==
=== Goals ===
Correct as of November 14, 2013

Goals
Pos.	Playing Pos.	Nation	Name	Goals
1	FW	(Jamaica)	Richard West	19
2	FW	(Canada)	Kadian Lecky	6
3	DF		Ali Hanam	5
4	MF	(Spain)	Xavi Pérez	4
5	DF	(Canada)	Ryan Dummett	2
5	MF	(Canada)	Matthew Rios	2
6	DF	(Canada)	Dino Gardner	1
6	DF	(Canada)	Desmond Humphrey	1
6	FW	(Canada)	Tristan Jackman	1
6	DF	(Canada)	Gerard Ladiyou	1
6	MF		Nico Martinez	1
6	MF		Mario Orestano	1
Total				45
