= 2015 York Region Shooters season =

York Region Shooters
2015 season
- Chairman: Tony De Thomasis
- Manager: Tony De Thomasis
- Canadian Soccer League: 3rd place (First Division)
- CSL Championship: Semifinal
- Top goalscorer: Richard West (23)
Home colours	Away colours

The 2015 season was York Region Shooters's 18th season in the Canadian Soccer League. It began on May 10, 2015 and concluded on October 18, 2015. York Region entered the season as reigning CSL champions after producing a perfect season in the previous campaign. After a difficult start to the season York Region managed to recover midway through the season, and secured a postseason berth. In the playoffs the Shooters won the opening match, but failed to successfully defend their championship title following a defeat to Toronto Croatia. While Richard West finished for the third consecutive season as the club's top goalscorer with 23 goals, and subsequently as the league's CSL Golden Boot winner.

== Summary ==
In the off season significant changes occurred in the team management initially with the arrival of former Ajax A1 manager Bob de Klerk as the club's Technical Director. Team owner Tony De Thomasis replaced Darryl Gomez as head coach, and Carlos Rivas was another addition to the technical staff. The roster selection was partially influenced by the easing of import restrictions decided at the 2015 CSL annual team owners meeting. The Shooters used the opportunity by recruiting more overseas talent with the reliance of the organization's veteran core players.

York Region entered the season with a 21 match undefeated streak, but experienced their first defeat since October, 2013 in the opening match against Toronto Croatia. Initially York Region failed to achieve sufficient results as they only recorded one victory in their opening six matches. After recording a victory over Scarborough SC on June 21, 2015 they managed to produce a nine game undefeated streak. At the conclusion of the regular season they clinched a postseason berth by finishing third in the First Division with the second highest scoring record. In the preliminary round of the playoffs they defeated Burlington SC, but were eliminated in the second round to Toronto Croatia.

In the Second Division their reserve team was under the guidance of Gilbert Amaral, where the team managed to secure a postseason berth by finishing second in the division. Unfortunately the team was eliminated from the competition after recording a loss to Niagara United B in the quarterfinals. Once the season came to a conclusion the organization received two awards at the 2015 annual CSL awards ceremony with striker Richard West winning the CSL Golden Boot, and Cyndy De Thomasis was honored with the Harry Paul Gauss award.

== Club ==
=== Management ===
Position	Staff
Head coach	Tony De Thomasis
Assistant coach	Aundrea Rollins
Manager	John Pacione
Second Division Head coach	Gilbert Amaral
Second Division Assistant coach	Aundrea Rollins
Team Physician	Roger Menta
Team Trainer	Argyrs Tsoulos

Last updated: November 14, 2013

=== First Division roster ===
As of June 12, 2015.

Note: Flags indicate national team as defined under FIFA eligibility rules; some limited exceptions apply. Players may hold more than one non-FIFA nationality.

No.	Pos.	Nation	Player
1	GK	ITA	Emanuelle Ameltonis
2	DF	CAN	Gerard Ladiyou
4	DF		Marcelo Capozzolo
6	DF	CAN	Fitzroy Christie
7	MF	JAM	Richard Edwards
9	FW	JAM	Michael Binns
10	MF		Babjide Fatoba
11	FW	JAM	Ashton Bennett
12	MF	CAN	Mehdi Barati Mahvar
13	FW		William De Oliveira
14	FW	CAN	Tristan Jackman
15	MF		Andrei Spatary
17	FW	MKD	Aleksander Stojanovski
19	FW	CAN	Oswald Adu
20	FW	JAM	Richard West
21	FW		Luis Navarro
22	DF		Justin Soscia
23	DF	JAM	Ricky Herron
25	DF		Larry Miller
26	MF		Michael Lazzarotto
28	DF	ITA	Nicola Di Sanza
30	GK	CHI	Camilo Benzi

No.	Pos.	Nation	Player
77	DF	CAN	Desmond Humphrey
99	DF	CAN	Ryan Dummett
-	MF		Vinicius Argenton Silva Abreu
-	MF	CAN	Dylan Bams
-	MF	JAM	Marcelino Blackburn
-	MF		Kevin Blackford
-	DF	CAN	Dino Gardner
-	MF		Alexander Rodrigues De Carvalho
-	GK	CAN	Adrian Ibanez
-	MF	SCO	Hector Mackie
-	MF	SCO	Steven McDougall
21	FW		Luis Navarro
-	FW	CAN	Adrian Pena
-	MF	COL	Asher Quave-Robinson
-	MF	ESP	Xavi Pérez
-	MF		Paolo Henrique Oliva Da Silva
-	FW	JAM	Odain Simpson
-	MF	CAN	Jamil Thompson
-	MF		Shezan Singh
-	DF		Nathan Smith
-	MF		Acha Wisdom

=== Second Division roster ===
As of June 22, 2015.

Note: Flags indicate national team as defined under FIFA eligibility rules; some limited exceptions apply. Players may hold more than one non-FIFA nationality.

No.	Pos.	Nation	Player
1	GK	CAN	Adam Majer
2	FW		Nathan Smith
3	DF		Kyle Coelho
4	MF	CAN	Winston Crozier
5	DF	CAN	Joshua Kiselyov
6	DF		Junior Casinha
7	DF		Fedy Valcin
8	MF		Massi Kohgadai
9	MF		Joshua Amaral
11	MF		Apollo Tsoulos
12	FW	CAN	Kevin Ghatine
14	MF		Tyler Dawell Terrault
15	MF		Levi Deglau
16	DF	DOM	Wilson Martinez
17	MF		Brandon Simon
18	FW		Mohamad Habib
19	MF		Michael Anobile
20	MF		Albert Moshi

No.	Pos.	Nation	Player
77	DF		Marcus Malcom Orville
-	FW	CAN	Anthony Bahadur
-	GK		Christian Campanico
-	DF		Dean Campbell
-	MF	CAN	Daniele Clemente
-	MF		Felipe Cschack
-	MF		Raphael Barboza Da Silva
-	MF		Allan Pereira De Melo
-	GK		Andre Domingues
-	DF		Triston Frankson
-	MF		James Giraldo
-	MF		Niaran Goodie
-	MF		Nicholas Goodie
-	MF		Ahmed Hussein
-	MF		Sean Isaacs
-	GK	CAN	Damon Naghavi
-	MF	USA	David Schipper

=== In ===
No.	Pos.	Player	Transferred from	Fee/notes	Source
	FW	(Canada) Anthony Bahadur	(Canada) FC Edmonton	Free Agent	
9	FW	(Jamaica) Michael Binns	(Jamaica) Portmore United	Loan	
11	FW	(Jamaica) Ashton Bennett	(Jamaica) Portmore United	Free Transfer	
28	DF	(Italy) Nicola Di Sanza	(Italy) ASD Rotunda Maris	Free Transfer	
	MF	(Scotland) Steven McDougall	(Scotland) Clyde F.C.	Free Transfer	
	MF	(Jamaica) Odain Simpson	(Canada) Kingston FC	Free Transfer	

== Competitions summary ==
=== First division ===
Pos	Team	Pld	W	D	L	GF	GA	GD	Pts	Qualification
1	Serbian White Eagles (A, C)	22	16	4	2	52	17	+35	52	Qualification for Playoffs
2	Toronto Croatia (A, O)	22	15	3	4	57	18	+39	48	Qualification for Playoffs
3	York Region Shooters (A)	22	13	1	8	56	35	+21	40	Qualification for Playoffs
4	SC Waterloo Region (A)	21	11	3	7	34	27	+7	36 (Note: One match between SC Waterloo Region and Niagara United not played)	Qualification for Playoffs
5	Toronto Atomic FC (A)	22	10	2	10	23	37	−14	32	Qualification for Playoffs
6	Burlington SC (A)	22	8	3	11	41	44	−3	27	Qualification for Playoffs
7	Milton SC (A)	22	8	3	11	32	43	−11	27	Qualification for Playoffs
8	London City (A)	22	8	2	12	31	46	−15	26	Qualification for Playoffs
9	Brampton United	22	7	5	10	31	33	−2	26	
10	Scarborough SC	22	6	8	8	32	49	−17	26	
11	Brantford Galaxy	22	7	3	12	32	44	−12	24	
12	Niagara United	21	2	3	16	23	71	−48	9	

Updated to match(es) played on October 4, 2015. Source: []
Rules for classification: 1) points; 2) goal difference; 3) number of goals scored.
(A) Advance to a further round; (C) Champions; (O) Play-off winners

==== Results summary ====
Overall								Home						Away					
Pld	W	D	L	GF	GA	GD	Pts	W	D	L	GF	GA	GD	W	D	L	GF	GA	GD
25	13	1	11	56	35	+21	40	7	1	3	26	16	+10	6	0	8	30	19	+11

Last updated: October 1, 2015.
Source: 2015 Canadian Soccer League season

==== Results by round ====
Round	1	2	3	4	5	6	7	8	9	10	11	12	13	14	15	16	17	18	19	20	21	22
Ground	H	A	H	A	H	A	H	H	H	H	A	A	H	H	A	H	A	H	A	A	A	A
Result	L	L	W	L	L	L	W	W	W	W	W	W	W	D	W	L	L	W	L	W	W	W

Source: Regular season matches
A = Away; H = Home; W = Win; D = Draw; L = Loss

==== Matches ====
May 10, 2015	York Region Shooters	0–3	Toronto Croatia	Vaughan, Ontario
19:00		Report	Josip Keran 16'; Tihomir Maletic 63'; Darren Chambers 83'	Stadium: St. Joan Of Arc Turf Field

May 17, 2015	SC Waterloo Region	4–1	York Region Shooters	Waterloo, Ontario
19:00	Drazen Vukovic 3'; Adis Hasecic 64'; Ramon Bailey 27'	Report	Edwards 29'	Stadium: Warrior Field

May 24, 2015	York Region Shooters	3–0	Milton SC	Vaughan, Ontario
18:30	West, 69'; Binns 76'	Report		Stadium: St. Joan Of Arc Turf Field

May 30, 2015	Brantford Galaxy	3–2	York Region Shooters	Brantford, Ontario
19:00	Jurcevic 55'; Stuart Heath 74'; Markovic 76'	Report	Kyle Grootenboer 64' (o.g.); Binns 72'	Stadium: Steve Brown Sports Complex; Referee: Goran Babic

June 7, 2015	York Region Shooters	1–2	Serbian White Eagles	Vaughan, Ontario
18:30	Gardner 88'	Report	Vukomanovic 44'; Sahjah Reid 57'	Stadium: St. Joan Of Arc Turf Field

June 11, 2015	Milton SC	2–0	York Region Shooters	Milton, Ontario
	Predrag Papaz 9'; Rusnir Dizdarevic 90'	Report		Stadium: Jean Vanier Stadium; Referee: Goran Babic

June 21, 2015	York Region Shooters	4–1	Scarborough SC	Vaughan, Ontario
18:30	Marcelo Capozzolo 35', 47'; West 71'; Adrian Pena 84'	Report	Jose De Sousa 81'	Stadium: St. Joan Of Arc Turf Field

July 11, 2015	York Region Shooters	3–2	Toronto Atomic FC	Vaughan, Ontario
18:30	West 24', 75'; Stojanovski 33'	Report	Michael Tischer 45'; Melnyk 50'	Stadium: St. Joan Of Arc Turf Field

July 19, 2015	York Region Shooters	2–1	Brampton City United	Vaughan, Ontario
18:30	Di Sanza 7'; Shezan Singh 88'	Report	Krzysztof Tierzchala 29'	Stadium: St. Joan Of Arc Turf Field

July 26, 2015	York Region Shooters	4–1	SC Waterloo Region	Vaughan, Ontario
18:30	West 3', 36', 47'; Shezan Singh 78'	Report	Adis Hasecic 93'	Stadium: St. Joan Of Arc Turf Field

August 1, 2015	Burlington SC	0–2	York Region Shooters	Burlington, Ontario
		Report	West 49'; Adrian Pena 57'	Stadium: Nelson Stadium

August 7, 2015	Toronto Atomic FC	1–2	York Region Shooters	Toronto, Ontario
	Oscar Dui 93'	Report	West 36', 88'	Stadium: Centennial Park Stadium

August 9, 2015	York Region Shooters	4–1	Niagara United	Vaughan, Ontario
18:30	Stojanovski 28'; Adrian Pena 30', 60'; Gardner	Report	Michael Vitaterna 13'	Stadium: St. Joan Of Arc Turf Field

August 16, 2015	York Region Shooters	1–1	Brantford Galaxy	Vaughan, Ontario
18:30	Edwin Navarrete 40'	Report	Vukovic 41'	Stadium: St. Joan Of Arc Turf Field

August 21, 2015	Serbian White Eagles	0–3	York Region Shooters	Toronto, Ontario
		Report	West 52'; Desmond Humphrey 63', 77'	Stadium: Centennial Park Stadium

August 30, 2015	York Region Shooters	2–3	London City SC	Vaughan, Ontario
18:30	West 29'; Adrian Pena 78'	Report	Edin Kozika 6', 52'; Pešić 52'	Stadium: St. Joan Of Arc Turf Field

September 4, 2015	Scarborough SC	3–1	York Region Shooters	Toronto, Ontario
	Melo 7'; Marc Jankovic 37'; Orlovski 67'	Report	David Schipper 86'	Stadium: Downsview Park

September 12, 2015	York Region Shooters	2–1	Burlington SC	Vaughan, Ontario
18:30	Edwards 13'; Adrian Pena 86'	Report	Steven Craig 75'	Stadium: St. Joan Of Arc Turf Field; Referee: Goran Babic

September 19, 2015	Toronto Croatia	3–1	York Region Shooters	Toronto, Ontario
	Sven Arapovic 2'; Josip Keran 30', 83'	Report	McDougall 26'	Stadium: Centennial Park Stadium

September 25, 2015	Niagara United	1–9	York Region Shooters	Niagara Falls, Ontario
	Derek Paterson	Report	West 18', 42', 59', 62', 66'; McDougall; Adrian Pena; Odain Simpson; Stojanovski	Stadium: Kalar Sports Park

September 27, 2015	London City SC	2–7	York Region Shooters	London, Ontario
	Aldin Kukic 28'; Edin Kozika 65'	Report	West 4', 24', 32', 39', 45'; Shezan Singh 38'; Stojanovski 56'	Stadium: Hellenic Centre; Referee: Gus Espinal

October 4, 2015	Brampton City United	0–2	York Region Shooters	Brampton, Ontario
		Report		Stadium: Terry Fox Stadium

==== Postseason ====
October 11, 2015 Quarterfinal	York Region Shooters	4–2	Burlington SC	Vaughan, Ontario
18:00	West 10', 36', 92'; Stojanovski 40'	Report	Camilo Veloza 18', 50'	Stadium: Joan of Arc Turf Field

October 18, 2015 Semifinal	Toronto Croatia	3–2 (a.e.t.)	York Region Shooters	Toronto, Ontario
19:00	Josip Keran 81'; Tomislav Zadro 107'; Fresenga 113'	Report	Edwards 24'; Andrei Spatary 106'	Stadium: Centennial Park Stadium

=== Second division ===
Pos	Team	Pld	W	D	L	GF	GA	GD	Pts	Qualification
1	SC Waterloo Region B (A, C)	18	10	6	2	58	23	+35	36	Qualification for Playoffs
2	York Region Shooters B (A)	18	11	1	6	45	37	+8	34	Qualification for Playoffs
3	Milton SC B (A, O)	18	9	5	4	44	31	+13	32	Qualification for Playoffs
4	Burlington SC B (A)	18	9	3	6	34	34	0	30	Qualification for Playoffs
5	Brantford Galaxy B (A)	18	9	1	8	36	33	+3	28	Qualification for Playoffs
6	Toronto Atomic FC B (A)	18	7	3	8	42	39	+3	24	Qualification for Playoffs
7	Niagara United B (A)	18	6	5	7	38	37	+1	23	Qualification for Playoffs
8	Serbian White Eagles B (A)	18	5	4	9	31	62	−31	19	Qualification for Playoffs
9	Toronto Croatia B	18	4	2	12	35	57	−22	14	
10	Brampton United B	18	3	4	11	27	37	−10	13	

Updated to match(es) played on October 5, 2015. Source: http://canadiansoccerleague.ca/2015-2nd-division-standings/
Rules for classification: 1) points; 2) goal difference; 3) number of goals scored.
(A) Advance to a further round; (C) Champions; (O) Play-off winners

== Statistics ==
=== Goals and assists ===
Correct as of November 2015

First Division Goals
Pos.	Playing Pos.	Nation	Name	Appearances	Goals
1	FW	(Jamaica)	Richard West	21	23
2	FW	(Canada)	Adrian Pena	13	7
3	FW	(North Macedonia)	Aleksandar Stojanovski		4
4	MF		Shezan Singh		3
5	FW	(Jamaica)	Michael Binns		2
5	DF	(Canada)	Marcelo Capazolo		2
5	MF	(Jamaica)	Richard Edwards		2
5	DF	(Canada)	Dino Gardner		2
5	DF	(Canada)	Desmond Humphrey		2
5	MF	(Scotland)	Steven McDougall		2
6	DF	(Italy)	Nicola Di Sanza		1
6	MF		Edwin Navarrete		1
6	DF	(United States)	David Schipper		1
6	MF	(Jamaica)	Odain Simpson		1
Total				34	53

Second Division Goals
Pos.	Playing Pos.	Nation	Name	Appearances	Goals
1	MF		Raphael Barboza Da Silva	7	9
2	DF	(Italy)	Nicola Di Sanza	12	5
2	MF		Micael Lazzarotto	16	5
4	FW		Daylson Correia	15	4
4	MF		Andrei Spatary	5	4
Total				54	37
