= 2016 York Region Shooters season =

York Region Shooters
2016 season
- Chairman: Tony De Thomasis
- Manager: Tony De Thomasis
- Canadian Soccer League: 1st place (First Division)
- CSL Championship: Semifinal
- Top goalscorer: Richard West (13)
Home colours	Away colours

The 2016 season was York Region Shooters's 19th season in the Canadian Soccer League. It began on May 29, 2016 and concluded on October 23, 2016. The club finished the regular season with the First Division title with a new defensive club record. The organization qualified for the playoffs for the 14th consecutive season, and secured a victory in the preliminary round against Milton SC. In the semifinal York Region was eliminated from the competition in a penalty shootout to Hamilton City SC.

Their reserve side managed to also play in the postseason by finishing fourth in the Second Division, and secured their second championship. For the fourth consecutive season Richard West finished as the club's top goalscorer with 13 goals.

== Summary ==
In preparation for the 2016 season head coach Tony De Thomasis recruited several prominent Toronto Croatia veterans, and Caribbean internationals. Once the season commenced York Region produced an undefeated streak of eleven matches. As a result, finished the season as the First Division champions with a new club defensive record. In the opening round of the postseason York Region defeated Milton SC by a score of 5-0. In the semifinal the Shooters were defeated in a penalty shootout to Hamilton City SC.

In the Second Division the reserve team concluded the season with a postseason berth. In the preliminary rounds of the playoffs York Region Region B defeated London City SC, and SC Waterloo Region. In the championship final the Shooters claimed their second championship title after defeating Toronto Atomic B 2-1.

== Club ==
=== Management ===
Position	Staff
Head coach	Tony De Thomasis
Assistant coach	Aundrea Rollins
Manager	John Pacione
Second Division Head coach	Gilbert Amaral
Second Division Assistant coach	Aundrea Rollins
Team Physician	Roger Menta
Team Trainer	Argyrs Tsoulos

Last updated: November 14, 2013

=== First Division roster ===
As of September 30, 2016.

Note: Flags indicate national team as defined under FIFA eligibility rules; some limited exceptions apply. Players may hold more than one non-FIFA nationality.

No.	Pos.	Nation	Player
1	GK	ITA	Emanuelle Ameltonis
2	DF	JAM	Halburto Harris
5	DF	CAN	Gerard Ladiyou
8	MF		Tristan Frankson
9	DF	CAN	Shawn Brown
7	MF	JAM	Richard Edwards
9	FW	JAM	Michael Binns
10	MF	CAN	David Guzman
11	FW	JAM	Ashton Bennett
12	MF	TTO	Hayden Fitzwilliams
13	MF		Ivan Prieto
14	DF	CAN	Marcos Rodriguez
15	MF	USA	Evan Beutler
16	MF	BEL	Gilles Fogang
18	DF	JAM	Odain Omaro Simpson
19	MF	JAM	Camaal Reid
20	FW	JAM	Richard West
21	FW		Luis Navarro
30	DF	GUY	Adrian Butters
-	MF	CAN	Dylan Bams
-	MF	CAN	Mehdi Barati Mahvar
-	GK	CHI	Camilo Benzi
-	DF		Marcelo Capozzolo

No.	Pos.	Nation	Player
-	DF	CAN	Fitzroy Christey
-	DF	CAN	Winston Crozier
-	DF	ITA	Nicola Di Sanza
-	DF	CAN	Ryan Dummett
-	DF	CAN	Dino Gardner
-	DF	JAM	Ricky Herron
-	DF	CAN	Desmond Humphrey
-	GK	CAN	Adrian Ibanez
-	FW	CAN	Tristan Jackman
-	DF		John Jung
-	MF		Michael Lazzarotto
-	MF	CAN	Nicholas Lindsay
-	MF	SCO	Steven McDougall
-	FW	MKD	Aleksander Stojanovski
-	MF		Vinicius Argenton Silva Abreu
-	MF		Kevin Blackford
-	MF	CAN	Matthew Rios
-	MF		Alexander Rodrigues De Carvalho
-	MF	COL	Asher Quave-Robinson
-	MF		Andrei Spatary
-	DF	CAN	Justin Soscia
-	MF		Paolo Henrique Oliva Da Silva
-	MF	CAN	Jamil Thompson

=== Second Division roster ===
As of December 23, 2016.

Note: Flags indicate national team as defined under FIFA eligibility rules; some limited exceptions apply. Players may hold more than one non-FIFA nationality.

No.	Pos.	Nation	Player
1	GK	CAN	Adam Majer
2	MF		Max Jordan
3	MF		Bobo Kukamvidohsha
6	MF		Simon Petersen
7	FW		David Romano
10	MF		Carlos Gunner Tjiboreko
11	MF	CAN	Cruz Coronel
12	MF		Paul McGhie
13	MF		Maximus Leon
14	MF		Johnson Luyiga
16	MF		Adan Rivas
17	DF	CAN	Winston Crozier
19	MF		Genosh Manuelpillai
22	DF		Damien Strangio
23	MF		Jose Antonio Olvera-Sauredo
27	MF		Abakar Mahamat
-	MF		Joshua Amaral
-	MF		Nathaniel Amaral
-	MF		Michael Anobile
-	FW	CAN	Anthony Bahadur
-	MF		Raphael Barboza Da Silva
-	DF	URU	Federico Burguez

No.	Pos.	Nation	Player
-	GK		Christian Campanico
-	DF		Dean Campbell
-	DF		Junior Casinha
-	DF		Kyle Coelho
-	MF		Felipe Cschack
-	MF		Tyler Dawell Terrault
-	MF		Levi Deglau
-	GK		Andre Domingues
-	FW	CAN	Kevin Ghatine
-	MF		James Giraldo
-	MF		Niaran Goodie
-	FW		Mohamad Habib
-	MF		Ahmed Hussein
-	MF		Massi Kohgadai
-	DF	DOM	Wilson Martinez
-	MF		Albert Moshi
-	GK	CAN	Damon Naghavi
-	DF		Marcus Malcom Orville
-	MF	USA	David Schipper
-	FW		Nathan Smith
-	MF		Apollo Tsoulos
-	DF		Fedy Valcin

=== In ===
No.	Pos.	Player	Transferred from	Fee/notes	Source
15	MF	(United States) Evan Beutler	(United States) Alabama Crimson Tide	Free Agent	
9	DF	(Canada) Shawn Brown	(Canada) Toronto Croatia	Free Agent	
30	DF	(Guyana) Adrian Butters	(Canada) Oakville Blue Devils	Free Transfer	
	DF	(Italy) Nicola Di Sanza	(Dominican Republic) Atlántico FC	Free Transfer	
12	MF	(Trinidad and Tobago) Hayden Fitzwilliams	(Canada) Toronto Croatia	Free Agent	
2	DF	(Jamaica) Halburto Harris	(Canada) Toronto Croatia	Free Agent	
	FW	(Canada) Nicholas Lindsay	(Canada) Toronto Croatia	Free Agent	
19	MF	(Jamaica) Camaal Reid	(Jamaica) Sporting Central Academy	Free Transfer	

=== Out ===
No.	Pos.	Player	Transferred to	Fee/notes	Source
9	FW	(Jamaica) Michael Binns	(United States) Wilmington Hammerheads FC	Free Transfer	
	DF	(Uruguay) Federico Burguez	(Uruguay) Canadian SC	Free Transfer	
	DF	(Italy) Nicola Di Sanza	(Dominican Republic) Atlántico FC	Free Transfer	
	MF	(Spain) Xavi Pérez	(Spain) CF Gavà	Free Transfer	
	DF	(Dominican Republic) Wilson Martínez	(Dominican Republic) Atlántico FC	Free Transfer	

== Competitions summary ==
=== First division ===
Pos	Team	Pld	W	D	L	GF	GA	GD	Pts	Qualification
1	York Region Shooters (A, C)	21	16	3	2	40	10	+30	51	Qualification for Playoffs
2	FC Ukraine United (A)	21	9	6	6	45	38	+7	33	Qualification for Playoffs
3	Scarborough SC (A)	21	9	4	8	36	31	+5	31	Qualification for Playoffs
4	Serbian White Eagles (A, O)	21	9	3	9	33	27	+6	30	Qualification for Playoffs
5	Toronto Atomic FC (A)	21	8	6	7	36	37	−1	30	Qualification for Playoffs
6	Hamilton City (A)	21	6	5	10	31	38	−7	23	Qualification for Playoffs
7	Brantford Galaxy (A)	21	3	9	9	23	38	−15	18	Qualification for Playoffs
8	Milton SC (A)	21	4	4	13	25	50	−25	16	Qualification for Playoffs

Updated to match(es) played on October 9, 2016. Source: []
Rules for classification: 1) points; 2) goal difference; 3) number of goals scored.
(A) Advance to a further round; (C) Champions; (O) Play-off winners

==== Results summary ====
Overall								Home						Away					
Pld	W	D	L	GF	GA	GD	Pts	W	D	L	GF	GA	GD	W	D	L	GF	GA	GD
21	16	3	2	40	10	+30	51	8	1	1	23	6	+17	8	2	1	17	4	+13

Last updated: October 5, 2016.
Source: 2016 Canadian Soccer League season

==== Results by round ====
Round	1	2	3	4	5	6	7	8	9	10	11	12	13	14	15	16	17	18	19	20	21
Ground	A	H	A	A	A	H	A	H	A	A	A	H	A	H	A	H	H	H	H	A	H
Result	W	W	W	W	W	W	W	W	W	D	D	L	L	W	W	W	W	D	W	W	W

Source: Regular season matches
A = Away; H = Home; W = Win; D = Draw; L = Loss

==== Matches ====
May 29, 2016	Brantford Galaxy	2–3	York Region Shooters	Brantford, Ontario
19:00	Vukovic 24', 82'	Report	Edwards 17'; Marcos Rodriguez 34'; West 79'	Stadium: Steve Brown Sports Complex; Referee: Tony Amaral

June 5, 2016	York Region Shooters	3–1	Hamilton City SC	Vaughan, Ontario
18:30	Marcos Rodriguez 37'; West 74'; Stojanovski 77'	Report	Jurcevic 23'	Stadium: St. Joan Of Arc Turf Field

June 10, 2016	Serbian White Eagles	0–1	York Region Shooters	Toronto, Ontario
19:00		Report	Marcos Rodriguez 13'	Stadium: Centennial Park Stadium

July 2, 2016	Hamilton City SC	0–2	York Region Shooters	Hamilton, Ontario
18:00		Report	West 56'; Stojanovski 70'	Stadium: Cardinal Newman Field

July 8, 2016	Serbian White Eagles	0–1	York Region Shooters	Toronto, Ontario
19:00		Report	David Guzman	Stadium: Centennial Park Stadium; Referee: Marco Jaramillo

July 10, 2016	York Region Shooters	2–0	Milton SC	Vaughan, Ontario
18:30	Shawn Brown 10'; West 74'	Report		Stadium: St. Joan Of Arc Turf Field

July 15, 2016	Milton SC	1–4	York Region Shooters	Milton, Ontario
	Adnan Smajic	Report	West; Stojanovski; Halburto Harris,	Stadium: Jean Vanier Stadium

July 17, 2016	York Region Shooters	4–0	Toronto Atomic FC	Vaughan, Ontario
18:30	Stojanovski 40', 62'; West 42', 60'	Report		Stadium: St. Joan Of Arc Turf Field

July 23, 2016	Toronto Atomic FC	0–3	York Region Shooters	Toronto, Ontario
19:00		Report	West 12'; Shawn Brown 71'; David Guzman 78'	Stadium: Centennial Park Stadium

July 31, 2016	FC Ukraine United	0–0	York Region Shooters	Vaughan, Ontario
18:30		Report		Stadium: St. Joan Of Arc Turf Field

August 6, 2016	Toronto Atomic FC	0–0	York Region Shooters	Toronto, Ontario
19:00		Report		Stadium: Centennial Park Stadium; Referee: Milomir Tomic

August 14, 2016	York Region Shooters	0–1	Scarborough SC	Vaughan, Ontario
18:30		Report	Adis Hasecic 85'	Stadium: St. Joan Of Arc Turf Field

August 19, 2016	Hamilton City SC	1–0	York Region Shooters	Hamilton, Ontario
	Cabrilo 71'	Report		Stadium: Cardinal Newman Field

August 28, 2016	York Region Shooters	1–0	FC Ukraine United	Vaughan, Ontario
18:30	Bahadur 34'	Report		Stadium: St. Joan Of Arc Turf Field

September 3, 2016	Scarborough SC	0–2	York Region Shooters	Toronto, Ontario
		Report	Evan Beutler 34'; David Guzman 41'	Stadium: Birchmount Stadium

September 11, 2016	York Region Shooters	2–1	Serbian White Eagles	Vaughan, Ontario
18:30	West 9'; Miroslav Jovanovic 49' (o.g.)	Report	Svonja 70'	Stadium: St. Joan Of Arc Turf Field

September 18, 2016	York Region Shooters	3–0	FC Ukraine United	Vaughan, Ontario
18:30	West 21', 45', 66'	Report		Stadium: St. Joan Of Arc Turf Field

September 25, 2016	York Region Shooters	2–2	Brantford Galaxy	Vaughan, Ontario
18:30	Stojanovski 24', 71'	Report	Stepanovic 16', 31'	Stadium: St. Joan Of Arc Turf Field

October 2, 2016	York Region Shooters	2–0	Scarborough SC	Vaughan, Ontario
18:30	West 16'; Reid 27'	Report		Stadium: St. Joan Of Arc Turf Field

October 7, 2016	Milton SC	0–1	York Region Shooters	Milton, Ontario
		Report	Bahadur 89'	Stadium: Jean Vanier Stadium

October 9, 2016	York Region Shooters	4–1	Brantford Galaxy	Vaughan, Ontario
18:30	David Schipper 13'; Reid 38'; Odain Simpson 59'; David Guzman 66'	Report	Dragan Milovic 86'	Stadium: St. Joan Of Arc Turf Field

==== Postseason ====
October 16, 2016 Quarterfinal	York Region Shooters	5–0	Milton SC	Vaughan, Ontario
18:30	Gerard Ladiyou 14'; Ainsley Deer 13'; Bahadur 17'; Tristan Frankson 23'; West 52'	Report		Stadium: Joan of Arc Turf Field

October 23, 2016 Semifinal	York Region Shooters	1–1 (a.e.t.) (1–4 p)	Hamilton City SC	Vaughan, Ontario
18:30	David Guzman 76'	Report	Frane Grbesa 78'	Stadium: Joan of Arc Turf Field
	Penalties
	West (penalty scored); Herron (penalty missed); David Schipper (penalty missed); Odain Simpson (penalty missed)		Jurčević (penalty scored); James Nathan (penalty missed); Čabrilo (penalty scored); Arsen Platis (penalty missed); Krmar (penalty scored)

=== Second division ===
Pos	Team	Pld	W	D	L	GF	GA	GD	Pts	Qualification
1	SC Waterloo Region (A, C)	14	9	2	3	56	25	+31	29	Qualification for Playoffs
2	Toronto Atomic FC B (A)	15	9	2	4	56	28	+28	29	Qualification for Playoffs
3	Brantford Galaxy B (A)	14	8	2	4	44	30	+14	26	Qualification for Playoffs
4	York Region Shooters B (A, O)	15	5	3	7	32	34	−2	18	Qualification for Playoffs
5	London City (A)	13	4	1	8	31	45	−14	13	Qualification for Playoffs
6	Serbian White Eagles B (A)	13	2	0	11	19	76	−57	6	Qualification for Playoffs

Updated to match(es) played on October 9, 2016. Source: canadiansoccerleague.ca
Rules for classification: 1) points; 2) goal difference; 3) number of goals scored.
(A) Advance to a further round; (C) Champions; (O) Play-off winners

== Statistics ==
=== Goals and assists ===
Correct as of November, 2016

First Division Goals
Pos.	Playing Pos.	Nation	Name	Appearances	Goals
1	FW	(Jamaica)	Richard West		13
2	FW	(North Macedonia)	Aleksandar Stojanovski		7
3	MF	(Canada)	David Guzman		4
4	MF	(Canada)	Marcos Rodriguez		3
5	FW	(Canada)	Anthony Bahadur		2
5	DF	(Canada)	Shawn Brown		2
5	DF	(Jamaica)	Haliburto Harris		2
5	MF	(Jamaica)	Camaal Reid		2
6	MF	(United States)	Evan Beutler		1
6	MF	(Jamaica)	Richard Edwards		1
6	DF	(United States)	David Schipper		1
6	MF	(Jamaica)	Odain Simpson		1
Total					40
