= 2014 York Region Shooters season =

York Region Shooters
2014 season
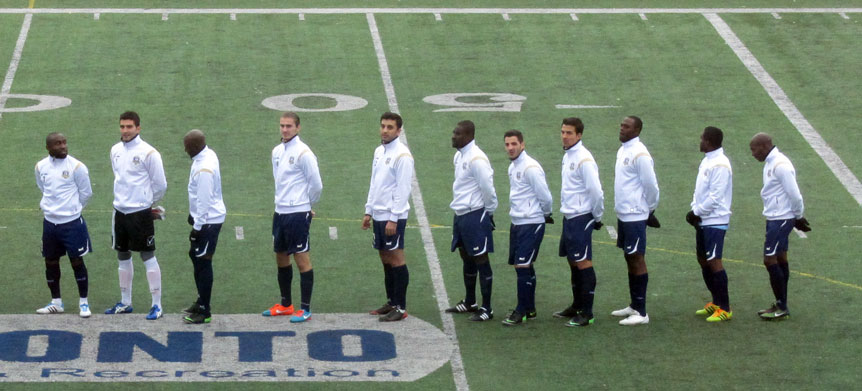
- York Region Shooters line-up before 2014 CSL Championship final
- Chairman: Tony De Thomasis
- Manager: Darryl Gomez
- Canadian Soccer League: 1st place (First Division)
- CSL Championship: Champions
- Top goalscorer: Richard West (9)
Home colours	Away colours

The 2014 season was York Region Shooters's 17th season in the Canadian Soccer League. It began on May 25, 2014 and concluded on October 26 2014. The club ended the Canadian Soccer League campaign as champions without a single defeat – a record of 13 wins and 5 draws. Their perfect season also included the First Division title with York Region finishing eleven points ahead of Toronto Croatia. In the preliminary round of the postseason the club defeated Brampton City United. In the second round they defeated Astros Vasas FC, and Toronto Croatia in the CSL Championship final. For the second consecutive season striker Richard West finished as the club's top goalscorer with nine goals.

== Summary ==
The Canadian Soccer League's strained relationship with the Canadian Soccer Association continued before the launch of the 2014 season with the CSA expelling the CSL from its membership over alleged violations of rules and regulations. After failing to specify which rule violations were made the CSL in response filed litigation against the CSA. As a result the league began operating as a private league under the auspicious of the Soccer Federation of Canada.

Before the launch of the season York Region formed an affiliation deal with Winstars Academy Group. The agreement officially aligned the academy to the York Region Shooters, and launched a team in the Second Division as the Winstars Shooters. Changes were made to the managerial team with former player Darryl Gomez given the mantle of head coach, with Tony De Thomasis serving as his assistant coach. Gomez constructed his roster with imports with Caribbean and European experience along with several Canadian Interuniversity Sport players.

The season marked a historic milestone in the organization's history as they managed to produce a perfect season, and a team record of only 15 goals conceded. York Region became the second team in the league's history to achieve a perfect season including the CSL Championship. In the Second Division their reserve team finished third in the standings. At the conclusion of the season accolades were given to Darryl Gomez as the Coach of the Year.

== Club ==
=== Management ===
Position	Staff
Head coach	Darryl Gomez
Assistant coach	Tony De Thomasis
Director	Tony De Thomasis
Manager	John Pacione
Trainer	Argyrios Tsoulos
Massage Therapist	Roger Manta

Last updated: March 14, 2015

=== First Division roster ===
As of March 14, 2014.

Note: Flags indicate national team as defined under FIFA eligibility rules; some limited exceptions apply. Players may hold more than one non-FIFA nationality.

No.	Pos.	Nation	Player
1	GK	ITA	Emanuelle Ameltonis
2	DF	CAN	Gerard Ladiyou
3	DF	JAM	Ricky Herron
5	MF		Mahmoun Mirsadeghi
6	DF	CAN	Fitzroy Christie
7	MF	JAM	Richard Edwards
9	MF		Yora Enzam
10	FW	CAN	Adrian Pena
11	FW	CAN	Kadian Lecky
13	MF		Aundrae Rollins
14	FW	CAN	Tristan Jackman
15	MF	ESP	Xavi Pérez
18	DF	CAN	Dino Gardner
19	FW	CAN	Oswald Adu
20	FW	JAM	Richard West
21	MF	SCO	Hector Mackie
22	GK	CHI	Camilo Benzi

No.	Pos.	Nation	Player
23	MF		Mario Orestano
25	DF		Larry Miller
77	DF	CAN	Desmond Humphrey
99	DF	CAN	Ryan Dummett
-	MF	CAN	Dylan Bams
-	MF	CAN	Mehdi Barati Mahvar
-	MF	JAM	Marcelino Blackburn
-	MF		Kevin Blackford
-	MF		Babjide Fatoba
-	MF		Roland Gavin
-	GK	CAN	Adrian Ibanez
-	MF		Nico Martinez
-	DF	DOM	Wilson Martínez
-	MF		Aaron Reeves
-	MF	CAN	Jamil Thompson
-	DF		Nathan Smith
-	MF		Acha Wisdom

=== In ===
No.	Pos.	Player	Transferred from	Fee/notes	Source
21	MF	(Scotland) Hector Mackie	(England) Hayes & Yeading United F.C.	Free Transfer	
	MF	(Jamaica) Marcelino Blackburn	(Jamaica) Arnett Gardens	Loan	
	FW	(North Macedonia) Aleksandar Stojanovski	(North Macedonia) Metalurg Skopje	Free Transfer	

=== Out ===
No.	Pos.	Player	Transferred to	Fee/notes	Source
	FW	(Italy) Nicola Di Sanza	(Italy) ASD Rotunda Maris	Free Transfer	
	GK	(Japan) Yasuto Hoshiko	(Canada) Kingston FC	Free Transfer	

== Competitions summary ==
=== First division ===
Pos	Team	Pld	W	D	L	GF	GA	GD	Pts	Qualification
1	York Region Shooters (A, C, O)	18	13	5	0	42	15	+27	44	Qualification for Playoffs
2	Toronto Croatia (A)	18	10	3	5	40	27	+13	33	Qualification for Playoffs
3	Kingston FC (A)	18	8	4	6	47	38	+9	28	Qualification for Playoffs
4	Astros Vasas (A)	18	7	5	6	31	22	+9	26	Qualification for Playoffs
5	Burlington SC (A)	18	7	3	8	23	37	−14	24	Qualification for Playoffs
6	Serbian White Eagles (A)	18	6	5	7	32	20	+12	23	Qualification for Playoffs
7	SC Waterloo Region (A)	18	6	4	8	33	42	−9	22	Qualification for Playoffs
8	Brampton United (A)	18	6	3	9	19	25	−6	21	Qualification for Playoffs
9	London City	18	6	2	10	31	46	−15	20	
10	Niagara United	18	3	2	13	23	49	−26	11	

Source: []
Rules for classification: 1) points; 2) goal difference; 3) number of goals scored.
(A) Advance to a further round; (C) Champions; (O) Play-off winners

==== Results summary ====
Overall								Home						Away					
Pld	W	D	L	GF	GA	GD	Pts	W	D	L	GF	GA	GD	W	D	L	GF	GA	GD
18	13	5	0	42	15	+27	44	8	1	0	19	7	+12	5	4	0	23	8	+15

Last updated: October 6, 2014.
Source: 2014 Canadian Soccer League season

==== Results by round ====
Round	1	2	3	4	5	6	7	8	9	10	11	12	13	14	15	16	17	18
Ground	H	H	H	H	H	A	H	A	H	A	A	H	A	A	A	A	A	H
Result	W	W	W	D	W	W	W	D	W	W	W	W	D	W	W	D	D	W

Source: Regular season matches
A = Away; H = Home; W = Win; D = Draw; L = Loss

==== Matches ====
May 25, 2014	York Region Shooters	3–2	Kingston FC	Vaughan, Ontario
18:30	Hector Mackie 47', 70'; Adrian Pena 73'	Report	Guillaume Surot 63', 80'	Stadium: St. Joan Of Arc Turf Field

June 8, 2014	York Region Shooters	1–0	Burlington SC	Vaughan, Ontario
18:30	Nathan Smith 81'	Report		Stadium: St. Joan Of Arc Turf Field

June 15, 2014	York Region Shooters	4–1	Astros Vasas FC	Vaughan, Ontario
18:30	West 2', 34'; Herron 56'; Oswald Adu 75'	Report	Jose Goncalves De Sousa 5'	Stadium: St. Joan Of Arc Turf Field

June 22, 2014	York Region Shooters	0–0	Brampton City United	Vaughan, Ontario
18:30		Report; Report		Stadium: St. Joan Of Arc Turf Field; Referee: Joshua Jaramillo

June 29, 2014	York Region Shooters	3–1	London City SC	Vaughan, Ontario
18:30	West 69', 79'; Yora Enzam 87'	Report	Marin Vucemilovic Grgic 32'	Stadium: St. Joan Of Arc Turf Field

July 5, 2014	Toronto Croatia	1–2	York Region Shooters	Mississauga, Ontario
20:00	Roberto Gallo 8'	Report	West 16'; Mario Orestano 17'	Stadium: Hershey Centre

July 20, 2014	York Region Shooters	2–1	Niagara United	Vaughan, Ontario
18:30	West 52'; Yora Enzam 83'	Report	Mohammed Mohammed 49'	Stadium: St. Joan Of Arc Turf Field

July 23, 2014	Brampton City United	1–1	York Region Shooters	Brampton, Ontario
	Leaford Allen 55'	Report	Hector Mackie 45'	Stadium: Terry Fox Stadium

July 27, 2014	York Region Shooters	1–0	Serbian White Eagles	Vaughan, Ontario
18:30	Gerard Ladiyou 15'	Report		Stadium: St. Joan Of Arc Turf Field; Referee: Davor Krasic

August 1, 2014	London City SC	1–4	York Region Shooters	London, Ontario
20:30	Marin Vucemilovic Grgic 74'	Report	Ryan Dummett 54'; Babjide Fatoba 56'; Oswald Adu 59', 82'	Stadium: Hellenic Centre

August 17, 2014	SC Waterloo Region	0–4	York Region Shooters	Waterloo, Ontario
19:00		Report	Babjide Fatoba 23'; Edwards 61', 73'; Adrian Pena 84'	Stadium: Warrior Field

August 24, 2014	York Region Shooters	2–0	SC Waterloo Region	Vaughan, Ontario
18:30	Edwards 57', 85'	Report		Stadium: St. Joan Of Arc Turf Field

August 30, 2014	Serbian White Eagles	1–1	York Region Shooters	Toronto, Ontario
19:00	Sahjah Reid 60'	Report	Adrian Pena 86'	Stadium: Lamport Stadium

September 6, 2014	Niagara United	0–4	York Region Shooters	Niagara Falls, Ontario
19:00		Report	Mario Orestano 24'; Desmond Humphrey 52'; Ryan Dummett 82'; West 84'	Stadium: Kalar Sports Park

September 14, 2014	Burlington SC	1–4	York Region Shooters	Burlington, Ontario
20:00	Marco Machado 72'	Report	Mario Orestano 3'; Ryan Dummett 5'; Edwards 43'; West 52'	Stadium: Nelson Stadium

September 21, 2014	Astros Vasas FC	1–1	York Region Shooters	Toronto, Ontario
	Gala 11'	Report	Oswald Adu 30'	Stadium: Esther Shiner Stadium

September 28, 2014	Kingston FC	2–2	York Region Shooters	Kingston, Ontario
13:00	Mademba Ba 13', 51'	Report; Report	Adrian Pena 41'; Mehdi Baratimahvar 70'	Stadium: Queen’s West Campus Field

October 6, 2014	York Region Shooters	3–2	Toronto Croatia	Vaughan, Ontario
18:30	Desmond Humphrey 10'; West 50'; Babjide Fatoba 59'	Report	Pero Menalo 16'; Josip Keran 81'	Stadium: St. Joan Of Arc Turf Field

==== Postseason ====
October 12, 2014 Quarterfinal	York Region Shooters	3–0	Brampton City United	Vaughan, Ontario
18:00	Oswald Adu 16'; West 79'; Hector Mackie 90+1'	Report		Stadium: Joan of Arc Turf Field

October 19, 2014 Semifinal	York Region Shooters	1–0	Astros Vasas FC	Vaughan, Ontario
18:00	Hector Mackie 78'	Report		Stadium: Joan of Arc Turf Field

October 26, 2014 Final	York Region Shooters	1–1 (a.e.t.) (5–4 p)	Toronto Croatia	Toronto, Ontario
16:15	West 110'	Report	Shawn Brown 116'	Stadium: Esther Shiner Stadium; Attendance: 400; Referee: Marco Jaramillo
	Penalties
	Desmond Humphrey (penalty scored); Babjide Fatoba (penalty scored); Hector Mackie (penalty scored); Herron (penalty scored); Edwards (penalty scored)		Pero Menalo (penalty scored); Fitzwilliams (penalty scored); Velastegui (penalty scored); Ante Zivkovic (penalty missed); Daniel Niksic (penalty scored)

== Statistics ==
=== Goals ===
Correct as of October 6, 2014

First Division Goals
Pos.	Playing Pos.	Nation	Name	Goals
1	FW	(Jamaica)	Richard West	9
2	FW	(Jamaica)	Richard Edwards	5
3	MF		Oswald Adu	4
3	MF	(Canada)	Adrian Pena	4
4	DF	(Canada)	Ryan Dummett	3
4	MF		Babjide Fatoba	3
4	MF	(Scotland)	Hector Mackie	3
4	MF		Mario Orestano	3
5	MF		Yora Enzam	2
5	MF	(Canada)	Desmond Humphrey	2
6	MF	(Canada)	Mehdi Barati Mahvar	1
6	DF	(Jamaica)	Ricky Herron	1
6	DF	(Canada)	Gerard Ladiyou	1
6	DF		Nathan Smith	1
Total				42

Second Division Goals
Pos.	Playing Pos.	Nation	Name	Appearances	Goals
1	FW	(North Macedonia)	Aleksandar Stojanovski	10	9
2	FW		Marcelo Tantalo	12	8
Total				22	17
