= 2012 York Region Shooters season =

York Region Shooters
2012 season
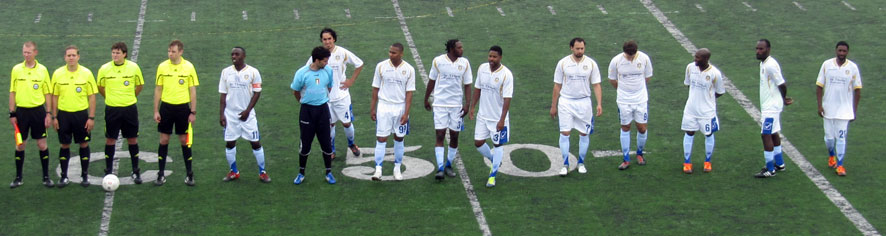
- York Region Shooters line-up before the match against North York Astros at Esther Shiner Stadium, May 2012
- Chairman: Tony De Thomasis
- Manager: Tony De Thomasis
- Canadian Soccer League: 5th place (First Division)
- CSL Championship: Semifinal
- Top goalscorer: Jason De Thomasis; Kadian Lecky; Aundrae Rollins (4)
Home colours	Away colours

The 2012 season was York Region Shooters's 15th season in the Canadian Soccer League. The season witnessed York Region finish in the top five in the First Division since the 2010 season with the fourth highest defensive record. The club qualified for the playoffs for the 10th consecutive season, and defeated the Windsor Stars in the opening round. Their postseason journey came to a conclusion in the second round after a defeat to the Montreal Impact Academy, while their reserve team shared a similar fate in the Second Division playoffs after a loss to Brampton City United B. The top goalscorers for the season were Jason De Thomasis, Aundrae Rollins, and for the record seventh consecutive time Kadian Lecky each with four goals.

== Summary ==
The club began preparations for the 2012 season by making an agreement with PEAC School for Elite Athletes for the access of their facilities and expertise of qualified instructors. The managerial structure changed with Tony De Thomasis returning to the helm as head coach. York's schedule saw them kick off their season at home on May 6, with the Shooters winning 1–0 thanks to a goal from Aundrae Rollins. Following their victory at home the club achieved a four game undefeated streak. After receiving their first defeat of the season on June 1 against the Serbian White Eagles the club recovered with a fourteen game undefeated streak with only two defeats recorded throughout the season.

The organization managed a fifth place standing in the First Division as a result secured a postseason berth. In the preliminary round of the playoffs the Shooters defeated the Windsor Stars, but were eliminated in the following round by the Montreal Impact Academy. Meanwhile in the Second Division their reserve team clinched their fifth consecutive playoff berth after finishing seventh in the standings. The team reached the semifinals, but were defeated by Brampton City United B by a score of 2–0.

== Club ==
=== Management ===
Position	Staff
Head coach & Director	Tony De Thomasis
Assistant coach	Americo Tantalo
Assistant coach	Carlos Rivas
Assistant coach	Vasilis Androutsos
Manager	John Pacione
Assistant manager	Tony Crispo
Massage Therapist	Eric Yuill

Last updated: June 6, 2012

== Squad ==
As of October 7, 2012.

Note: Flags indicate national team as defined under FIFA eligibility rules; some limited exceptions apply. Players may hold more than one non-FIFA nationality.

No.	Pos.	Nation	Player
1	GK	CHI	Camilo Benzi
2	DF		Andre Stewart
3	DF	JAM	Ricky Herron
4	DF	CAN	Marcelo Capazolo
5	MF	CAN	Alex Trujillo
6	DF	CAN	Fitzroy Christie
17	MF	CAN	Matthew O'Connor
9	FW	CAN	Jason De Thomasis
11	FW	CAN	Kadian Lecky
13	MF		Aundrae Rollins
14	FW	USA	Samuel Roca
17	FW		Goncalo Almeida

No.	Pos.	Nation	Player
18	FW		Shezan Singh
19	DF	BER	Taurean Manders
20	FW	CAN	Jalen Brome
21	MF	SKN	Darryl Gomez
22	FW	CAN	Julian Uccello
77	DF	CAN	Desmond Humphrey
99	DF	CAN	Ryan Dummett
–	GK	ITA	Emanuelle Ameltonis
–	MF	CAN	Carlos Rivas Godoy
–	FW	CAN	Tristan Jackman
–	MF		Sargan Mate
–	MF		Chris Thomas

=== In ===
No.	Pos.	Player	Transferred from	Fee/notes	Source
	GK	(Italy) Emanuelle Ameltonis	(Italy) Atessa Val di Sangro S.S.D.	Free Transfer	
21	MF	(Saint Kitts and Nevis) Darryl Gomez	(Canada) Serbian White Eagles	Free Transfer	
	FW	(Canada) Tristan Jackman	(Canada) TFC Academy	Free Transfer	
19	DF	(Bermuda) Taurean Manders	(Canada) Capital City F.C.	Free Transfer	
14	FW	(United States) Samuel Roca	(Canada) Capital City F.C.	Free Transfer	
2	DF	Andre Stewart	(Canada) Portugal FC	Free Transfer	
22	FW	(Canada) Julian Uccello	(Italy) F.C. Crotone	Free Transfer	

=== Out ===
No.	Pos.	Player	Transferred to	Fee/notes	Source
	DF	(Guyana) Adrian Butters	(Sweden) Juventus IF	Free Transfer	
14	DF	(Canada) Dino Gardner	(Canada) FC Edmonton	Free Transfer	
	DF	(Canada) Taylor Lord	(United States) Dayton Dutch Lions	Free Transfer	
	GK	(Japan) Yasuto Hoshiko	(Hungary) BKV Elore SC	Free Transfer	

== Competitions summary ==
=== First division ===
Pos	Team	Pld	W	D	L	GF	GA	GD	Pts	Qualification
1	Toronto Croatia (A, C, O)	22	15	6	1	57	13	+44	51	Playoffs
2	Montreal Impact Academy (A)	22	14	5	3	52	17	+35	47	Playoffs
3	SC Toronto (A)	22	14	4	4	51	16	+35	46	Playoffs
4	Windsor Stars (A)	22	12	4	6	46	21	+25	40	Playoffs
5	York Region Shooters (A)	22	9	11	2	33	19	+14	38	Playoffs
6	Serbian White Eagles (A)	22	10	5	7	48	35	+13	35	Playoffs
7	TFC Academy (A)	22	10	5	7	42	28	+14	35	Playoffs
8	Niagara United (A)	22	10	3	9	34	36	−2	33	Playoffs
9	SC Waterloo Region	22	10	1	11	46	37	+9	31	
10	Mississauga Eagles	22	8	5	9	42	44	−2	29	
11	Brampton United	22	8	4	10	49	35	+14	28	
12	London City	22	7	7	8	34	55	−21	28	
13	Brantford Galaxy	22	8	1	13	40	68	−28	25	
14	Kingston FC	22	4	1	17	23	61	−38	13	
15	St. Catharines Wolves	22	1	5	16	13	67	−54	8	
16	North York Astros	22	2	1	19	15	73	−58	7	

Source: []
Rules for classification: 1) points; 2) goal difference; 3) number of goals scored.
(A) Advance to a further round; (C) Champions; (O) Play-off winners

==== Results summary ====
Overall								Home						Away					
Pld	W	D	L	GF	GA	GD	Pts	W	D	L	GF	GA	GD	W	D	L	GF	GA	GD
22	9	11	2	33	19	+14	38	5	5	1	22	13	+9	4	6	1	11	6	+5

Last updated: October 7, 2012.
Source: 2012 Canadian Soccer League season

==== Results by round ====
Round	1	2	3	4	5	6	7	8	9	10	11	12	13	14	15	16	17	18	19	20	21	22
Ground	H	A	A	A	A	H	A	A	H	H	A	H	H	H	H	H	A	A	H	H	H	A
Result	W	D	D	D	L	W	D	W	D	D	W	W	D	W	D	W	W	W	D	D	L	D

Source: Regular season matches
A = Away; H = Home; W = Win; D = Draw; L = Loss

==== Matches ====
May 6, 2012	York Region Shooters	1–0	Brantford Galaxy	Vaughan, Ontario
18:30	Aundrae Rollins 9'	Report		Stadium: St. Joan Of Arc Turf Field; Attendance: 200; Referee: Justin Tasev (OSA)

May 12, 2012	Kingston FC	1–1	York Region Shooters	Kingston, Ontario
19:00	Edgar Soglo 15'	Report	Manders 45'	Stadium: Invista Centre; Referee: Carolanne Chenard (OSA)

May 13, 2012	Montreal Impact Academy	0–0	York Region Shooters	Montreal, Quebec
14:00		Report		Stadium: CS St Jean De Vianney; Referee: Carolanne Chenard (QSF)

May 27, 2012	North York Astros	0–0	York Region Shooters	Toronto, Ontario
16:30		Report		Stadium: Esther Shiner Stadium; Attendance: 70; Referee: Yusri Rudolf (OSA)

June 1, 2012	Serbian White Eagles	1–0	York Region Shooters	Toronto, Ontario
20:00	Sasa Vukoje (0.4)	Report		Stadium: Centennial Park Stadium; Attendance: 40; Referee: Geoff Gamble (OSA)

June 10, 2012	York Region Shooters	1–0	St. Catharines Wolves	Vaughan, Ontario
18:30	Desmond Humphrey 51'	Report		Stadium: St. Joan Of Arc Turf Field; Attendance: 100; Referee: Hassane Rifai (OSA)

June 15, 2012	London City SC	2–2	York Region Shooters	London, Ontario
20:30	Novkovic 11'; Stojanovic 60'	Report	Chris Thomas 42'; Ryan Dummett 91'	Stadium: Cove Road Stadium

June 17, 2012	Windsor Stars	1–2	York Region Shooters	Windsor, Ontario
19:15	Joel Kabula 70'	Report	Chris Thomas 45'; O'Connor 51'	Stadium: Windsor Stadium; Referee: Arthur Kobiel (OSA)

June 24, 2012	York Region Shooters	1–1	SC Toronto	Vaughan, Ontario
18:30	Jason De Thomasis 37'	Report	Kyle Hall 82'	Stadium: St. Joan Of Arc Turf Field

July 8, 2012	York Region Shooters	4–4	Brampton City United	Vaughan, Ontario
18:30	Jason De Thomasis 37'; Aundre Rollins 45'; Manders 46'; Alex Trujillo 90'	Report	Milos Scepanovic 23', 85'; David Guzman 36'; Velastegui 88'	Stadium: St. Joan Of Arc Turf Field; Attendance: 100; Referee: Justin Tasev (OSA)

July 13, 2012	TFC Academy	0–1	York Region Shooters	Toronto, Ontario
20:00		Report	Jason De Thomasis 69'	Stadium: Downsview Park

July 15, 2012	York Region Shooters	3–1	Mississauga Eagles FC	Vaughan, Ontario
18:30	Gomez 16'; Jason De Thomasis 24'; Aundre Rollins 44'	Report	Ivan Juric 9'	Stadium: St. Joan Of Arc Turf Field; Referee: Justin Tasev (OSA)

July 21, 2012	Niagara United	0–0	York Region Shooters	Niagara Falls, Ontario
19:00		Report		Stadium: Kalar Sports Park; Referee: Armando Pereira (OSA)

July 29, 2012	York Region Shooters	6–2	Kingston FC	Vaughan, Ontario
18:30	O'Connor 8'; Kadian Lecky 18'; Desmond Humphrey 21', 57'; Alex Trujillo 47'; Tristan Jackman 89'	Report	Edgar Soglo 30'; Sidorov 87'	Stadium: St. Joan Of Arc Turf Field; Attendance: 100; Referee: Jeff Fearnall (OSA)

August 12, 2012	York Region Shooters	1–1	Serbian White Eagles	Vaughan, Ontario
18:30	Herron 92'	Report	Sasa Vukoje 48'	Stadium: St. Joan Of Arc Turf Field; Attendance: 150; Referee: David Barrie (OSA)

August 19, 2012	York Region Shooters	3–1	North York Astros	Vaughan, Ontario
18:30	Manders 59'; Sargan Mate 84'; Kadian Lecky 89'	Report	Kurt Ramsey 55'	Stadium: St. Joan Of Arc Turf Field; Attendance: 80; Referee: Mack Meloche (OSA)

August 24, 2012	SC Toronto	0–1	York Region Shooters	Toronto, Ontario
20:00		Report	Fitzroy Christey 86'	Stadium: Lamport Stadium

September 7, 2012	Mississauga Eagles FC	1–4	York Region Shooters	Mississauga, Ontario
20:00	Melo 38'	Report	Fitzroy Christey 3'; O'Connor 10'; Chris Thomas 36'; Kadian Lecky 42'	Stadium: Hershey Centre

September 9, 2012	York Region Shooters	1–1	TFC Academy	Vaughan, Ontario
18:30	Aundrae Rollins 90'	Report	Janniere 83'	Stadium: St. Joan Of Arc Turf Field; Attendance: 125; Referee: Justin Tasev (OSA)

September 16, 2012	York Region Shooters	1–1	SC Waterloo Region	Vaughan, Ontario
18:30	Rivas 93'	Report	Zoran Kukic 10'	Stadium: St. Joan Of Arc Turf Field; Attendance: 80; Referee: Scott Decker (OSA)

September 30, 2012	York Region Shooters	0–1	Montreal Impact Academy	Vaughan, Ontario
18:30		Report	Ilcu 26'	Stadium: St. Joan Of Arc Turf Field; Referee: David Bailey (OSA)

October 7, 2012	Toronto Croatia	0–0	York Region Shooters	Toronto, Ontario
20:00		Report		Stadium: Centennial Park Stadium; Attendance: 80; Referee: Steven DePiero (OSA)

==== Postseason ====
October 14, 2012 Quarterfinal	Windsor Stars	0–1	York Region Shooters	Windsor, Ontario
16:00		Report	Gomez 75' (pem.)	Stadium: Windsor Stadium; Referee: Hassane Rafai (OSA)

October 21, 2012 Semifinal	Montreal Impact Academy	3–1	York Region Shooters	Montreal, Quebec
14:00	Lefevre 26' (pen.); Jackson-Hamel 46'; Ait-Slimane 90+4'	Report	Kadian Lecky 35'	Stadium: St Jean de Vianney; Referee: Christopher Grabasse (QSF)

== Statistics ==
=== Goals ===
Correct as of October 7, 2012

Goals
Pos.	Playing Pos.	Nation	Name	Goals
1	FW	(Canada)	Jason De Thomasis	4
1	FW	(Canada)	Kadian Lecky	4
1	MF		Aundrae Rollins	4
2	MF	(Bermuda)	Taurean Manders	3
2	MF	(Canada)	Matthew O'Connor	3
2	MF		Chris Thomas	3
3	DF	(Canada)	Fitzroy Christie	2
3	DF	(Canada)	Desmond Humphrey	2
3	MF	(Canada)	Alex Trujillo	2
4	DF	(Canada)	Ryan Dummett	1
4	MF	(Saint Kitts and Nevis)	Darryl Gomez	1
4	DF	(Jamaica)	Ricky Herron	1
4	MF	(Canada)	Tristan Jackman	1
4	MF		Sargan Mate	1
4	MF	(Canada)	Carlos Rivas Godoy	1
Total				33
