= 2011 York Region Shooters season =

York Region Shooters
2011 season
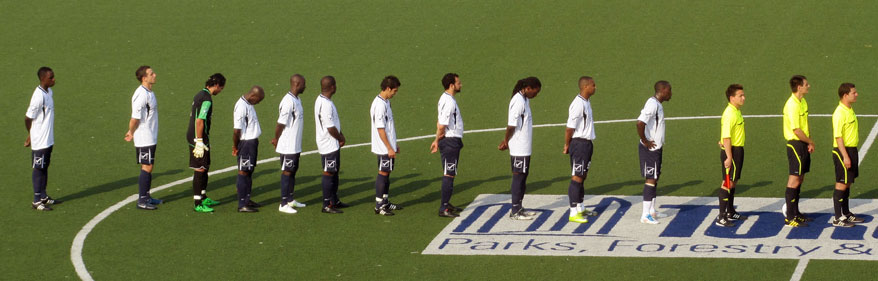
- York Region line-up before match against TFC Academy on July 2, 2011
- Chairman: Tony De Thomasis
- Manager: Filipe Bento (until August 21); Brian Bowes (from August 21)
- Canadian Soccer League: 8th place (First Division)
- CSL Championship: Semifinal
- Top goalscorer: Kadian Lecky (15)
Home colours	Away colours

The 2011 CSL season was the 14th season in York Region Shooters participation in the Canadian Soccer League. The club ended their CSL campaign by securing the final postseason berth in the First Division. In the postseason York Region defeated division champions SC Toronto in the preliminary round, but were eliminated from the competition in the following round to Toronto Croatia. While in the Second Division their reserve team clinched a playoff berth after finishing third in the East Conference standings. Kadian Lecky was Vaughan's top goalscorer for the sixth consecutive time scoring a personal record of 15 goals.

== Summary ==
The managerial structure remained intact with Filipe Bento resuming his coaching duties for the 2011 season. The roster assembled by Bento consisted of the traditional group of veteran core players with a few additions of CSL veterans and talent from abroad. Near the conclusion of the season Bento was replaced by former league veteran Brian Bowes. Throughout the season York Region struggled to achieve sufficient results, but managed to secure the final playoff berth after finishing eighth in the standings. Their postseason performance saw the club defeat First Division champions SC Toronto in the opening rounds, but in the second round the Shooters were eliminated from the competition after a defeat to Toronto Croatia.

Meanwhile in the Second Division their reserve team clinched a playoff berth after finishing third in the East Conference standings. While in the management staff the club lost the services of veteran club official Ruben Toro due to surgery complications from pneumonia. Toro was a notable member of the Brampton Hitmen team staff that won the 2005 CPSL Championship.

== Club ==
=== Management ===
Position	Staff
Head coach	Brian Bowes (from August 21)
Head coach	Filipe Bento (until August 21)
Assistant coach	Alex Shikov
Manager	John Pacione
Director	Tony De Thomasis
Club official	Eric Yuill

Last updated: May 8, 2011

== Squad ==
As of October 5, 2011.

Note: Flags indicate national team as defined under FIFA eligibility rules; some limited exceptions apply. Players may hold more than one non-FIFA nationality.

No.	Pos.	Nation	Player
1	GK	CHI	Camilo Benzi
2	DF	TTO	Rick Titus
4	DF	CAN	Marcelo Capazolo
5	MF		Nico Martinez
6	DF	CAN	Fitzroy Christie
7	MF		David James
8	DF		Chris Turner
9	FW	CAN	Jason De Thomasis
10	MF		Mario Orestano
11	FW	CAN	Kadian Lecky
13	MF		Aundrae Rollins
14	DF	CAN	Dino Gardner
15	MF	CAN	Stalin Cardenas
17	MF	CAN	Matthew O'Connor

No.	Pos.	Nation	Player
18	DF		Ali Hanam
19	FW	CAN	Miguel Knox
21	DF	JAM	Ricky Herron
22	FW	CAN	Jalen Brome
77	DF	CAN	Desmond Humphrey
88	MF		Nick Cisternino
99	DF	CAN	Ryan Dummett
–	DF	GUY	Adrian Butters
–	MF	CAN	Carlos Rivas Godoy
–	GK	JPN	Yasuto Hoshiko
–	DF	CAN	Taylor Lord
–	GK	CAN	Adam Majer
–	MF	CAN	Alex Trujillo

=== In ===
No.	Pos.	Player	Transferred from	Fee/notes	Source
	DF	(Guyana) Adrian Butters	(Singapore) Woodlands Wellington	Free Transfer	
14	DF	(Canada) Dino Gardner	(Canada) TFC Academy	Free Transfer	
	MF	(Canada) Carlos Rivas Godoy	(Chile) C.D. Universidad de Concepción	Free Transfer	
21	DF	(Jamaica) Ricky Herron	(United States) California Victory	Free Transfer	
	GK	(Japan) Yasuto Hoshiko	(Australia) Sorrento FC	Free Transfer	
19	FW	(Canada) Miguel Knox	(Canada) London City SC	Free Transfer	
	DF	(Canada) Taylor Lord	(Canada) Toronto Lynx	Free Transfer	

=== Out ===
No.	Pos.	Player	Transferred to	Fee/notes	Source
	MF	(Saint Kitts and Nevis) Darryl Gomez	(Canada) Serbian White Eagles	Free Transfer	
	MF	(Canada) Cameron Medwin	(Canada) Brampton City United	Free Transfer	

== Competitions summary ==
=== First division ===
Pos	Team	Pld	W	D	L	GF	GA	GD	Pts	Qualification
1	SC Toronto (A, C)	26	20	3	3	71	24	+47	63	Qualified for the Givova Cup play-offs
2	Toronto Croatia (A, O)	26	18	5	3	62	21	+41	59	Qualified for the Givova Cup play-offs
3	Capital City (A)	26	15	7	4	52	22	+30	52	Qualified for the Givova Cup play-offs
4	Brampton United (A)	26	15	3	8	61	43	+18	48	Qualified for the Givova Cup play-offs
5	Serbian White Eagles (A)	26	13	7	6	41	26	+15	46	Qualified for the Givova Cup play-offs
6	Montreal Impact Academy (A)	26	13	5	8	57	43	+14	44	Qualified for the Givova Cup play-offs
7	Mississauga Eagles (A)	26	13	3	10	44	29	+15	42	Qualified for the Givova Cup play-offs
8	York Region Shooters (A)	26	12	6	8	40	30	+10	42	Qualified for the Givova Cup play-offs
9	Brantford Galaxy	26	9	3	14	33	53	−20	30	
10	TFC Academy	25	8	3	14	43	44	−1	27	
11	London City	26	6	3	17	28	56	−28	21	
12	St. Catharines Wolves	26	5	4	17	28	77	−49	19	
13	Windsor Stars	26	3	4	19	28	67	−39	13	
14	North York Astros	25	0	6	19	19	72	−53	6	

Source: []
Rules for classification: 1) points; 2) goal difference; 3) number of goals scored.
(A) Advance to a further round; (C) Champions; (O) Play-off winners

==== Results summary ====
Overall								Home						Away					
Pld	W	D	L	GF	GA	GD	Pts	W	D	L	GF	GA	GD	W	D	L	GF	GA	GD
26	12	6	8	40	30	+10	42	7	3	3	23	12	+11	5	3	5	17	18	−1

Last updated: October 11, 2011.
Source: 2010 Canadian Soccer League season

==== Results by round ====
Round	1	2	3	4	5	6	7	8	9	10	11	12	13	14	15	16	17	18	19	20	21	22	23	24	25	26
Ground	H	H	H	A	H	A	A	H	A	A	A	A	A	H	H	H	A	A	H	H	H	A	H	H	A	A
Result	L	W	D	D	W	W	W	W	D	L	D	W	W	D	L	W	W	L	L	W	W	L	W	D	L	L

Source: Regular season matches
A = Away; H = Home; W = Win; D = Draw; L = Loss

==== Matches ====
May 8, 2011	York Region Shooters	0–1	Serbian White Eagles	Vaughan, Ontario
18:00		Report	Nikola Milosevic 39'	Stadium: St. Joan Of Arc Turf Field; Attendance: 125; Referee: Silviu Petrescu (OSA)

May 15, 2011	York Region Shooters	2–1	London City SC	Vaughan, Ontario
18:00	Desmond Humphrey 12'; Kadian Lecky 69'	Report	Beattie	Stadium: St. Joan Of Arc Turf Field

May 21, 2011	York Region Shooters	2–2	North York Astros	Vaughan, Ontario
17:00	Kadian Lecky 85', 90'	Report	Nordo Gooden 41'; Diego Maradona 45'	Stadium: St. Joan Of Arc Turf Field

May 27, 2011	Serbian White Eagles	0–0	York Region Shooters	Toronto, Ontario
20:00		Report		Stadium: Centennial Park Stadium; Attendance: 100; Referee: Manuel Orellano (OSA)

May 29, 2011	York Region Shooters	2–0	Brantford Galaxy	Vaughan, Ontario
18:00	Jason De Thomasis 30'; Kadian Lecky 63'	Report		Stadium: St. Joan Of Arc Turf Field

June 4, 2011	North York Astros	1–3	York Region Shooters	Toronto, Ontario
16:30	Kurt Ramsey 51'	Report	Gardner 58'; Desmond Humphrey 72'; Kadian Lecky	Stadium: Esther Shiner Stadium

June 8, 2011	St. Catharines Wolves	1–2	York Region Shooters	St. Catharines, Ontario
20:00	Matthew Waddington 90'	Report	Nico Martinez 48', 77'	Stadium: Club Roma Stadium

June 12, 2011	York Region Shooters	1–0	Mississauga Eagles FC	Vaughan, Ontario
18:00	Jason De Thomasis 93'	Report		Stadium: St. Joan Of Arc Turf Field

June 19, 2011	Toronto Croatia	2–2	York Region Shooters	Toronto, Ontario
20:00	Augustin De Medina 39'; Lee Hagerdon 44'	Report	Jason De Thomasis 45'; Kadian Lecky 72'	Stadium: Centennial Park Stadium; Referee: John Oliva (OSA)

June 25, 2011	Montreal Impact Academy	3–1	York Region Shooters	Montreal, Quebec
16:00	N'Diaye 17'; Riggi 69', 90'	Report	Desmond Humphrey 42'	Stadium: Saputo Stadium

June 26, 2011	Capital City FC	0–0	York Region Shooters	Ottawa, Ontario
13:00		Report		Stadium: Terry Fox Stadium

July 2, 2011	TFC Academy	0–1	York Region Shooters	Toronto, Ontario
18:00		Report	Kadian Lecky 11'	Stadium: Lamport Stadium; Attendance: 90; Referee: Andrew Kravets (OSA)

July 9, 2011	Windsor Stars	0–2	York Region Shooters	Windsor, Ontario
19:00		Report	Kadian Lecky 21', 41'	Stadium: Windsor Stadium; Referee: Arthur Korbeil (OSA)

July 17, 2011	York Region Shooters	0–0	Capital City FC	Vaughan, Ontario
17:00		Report		Stadium: St. Joan Of Arc Turf Field; Attendance: 50; Referee: Steven Senderovitch (OSA)

July 24, 2011	York Region Shooters	0–1	Toronto Croatia	Vaughan, Ontario
17:00		Report	Herrera 85'	Stadium: St. Joan Of Arc Turf Field

July 30, 2011	York Region Shooters	4–1	Windsor Stars	Vaughan, Ontario
13:00	Jason De Thomasis 39'; Gardner 62'; Desmond Humphrey 69'; Rivas 73'	Report	Aaron Byrd 11'	Stadium: St. Joan Of Arc Turf Field

August 12, 2011	London City SC	1–3	York Region Shooters	London, Ontario
20:38	Gigolaj 15'	Report	Kadian Lecky 8', 28'; Rivas 47'	Stadium: Cove Road Stadium

August 14, 2011	Mississauga Eagles FC	2–0	York Region Shooters	Mississauga, Ontario
19:00	James Langlois 21'; Melo 87'	Report		Stadium: Hershey Centre

August 21, 2011	York Region Shooters	1–2	TFC Academy	Vaughan, Ontario
18:00	Herron 90'	Report	Tristan Jackman 9'; Vukovic 24'	Stadium: St. Joan Of Arc Turf Field; Attendance: 100; Referee: David Barrie (OSA)

August 28, 2011	York Region Shooters	4–1	St. Catharines Wolves	Vaughan, Ontario
18:00	Gardner 22'; Jason De Thomasis 40'; Mario Orestano 49'; Lord 80'	Report	Tony Mermigas 90'	Stadium: St. Joan Of Arc Turf Field

September 10, 2011	York Region Shooters	3–0	Montreal Impact Academy	Vaughan, Ontario
17:00	Gardner 27'; Desmond Humphrey 35'; Kadian Lecky 36'	Report		Stadium: St. Joan Of Arc Turf Field; Attendance: 100; Referee: Justin Tasev (OSA)

September 14, 2011	Brantford Galaxy	3–2	York Region Shooters	Brantford, Ontario
21:00	Golijanin 2', 28'; Mitrovic 53'	Report	Kadian Lecky 33'; Titus 88'	Stadium: Steve Brown Sports Complex

September 18, 2011	York Region Shooters	2–1	Brampton City United	Vaughan, Ontario
18:00	Jason De Thomasis 2'; Kadian Lecky 73'	Report	Nunes 83'	Stadium: St. Joan Of Arc Turf Field; Attendance: 100; Referee: Archie Korbiel (OSA)

September 25, 2011	York Region Shooters	2–2	SC Toronto	Vaughan, Ontario
18:00	Mario Orestano 6'; Chris Turner 65'	Report	Alexandros Halis 26'; Mirabelli 46'	Stadium: St. Joan Of Arc Turf Field; Attendance: 120; Referee: David Barrie (OSA)

September 30, 2011	SC Toronto	2–1	York Region Shooters	Toronto, Ontario
20:00	Alexandros Halis 70', 79'	Report	Kadian Lecky 75'	Stadium: Lamport Stadium; Referee: Manuel Orellano (OSA)

October 5, 2011	Brampton City United	3–0	York Region Shooters	Brampton, Ontario
20:00	Andy Garcia 41', 60'; Kevin Omokhua 76'	Report		Stadium: Victoria Park Stadium; Attendance: 80; Referee: Justin Tasev (OSA)

==== Postseason ====
October 14, 2011 Quarterfinal	SC Toronto	4–3 (a.e.t.) (2–4 p)	York Region Shooters	Toronto, Ontario
20:00	Mirabelli 9', 73'; Alexandros Halis 51', 95'	Report	Kadian Lecky 38', 61'; Goncalo Almeida 90'	Stadium: Lamport Stadium; Attendance: 160; Referee: Gianni Facchini (OSA)
	Penalties
	Jarek Whiteman (penalty missed); Badat (penalty scored); Adrian Pena (penalty scored); Dane Roberts (penalty missed)		Chris Turner (penalty missed); Fitzroy Christey (penalty scored); Mario Orestano (penalty scored); Jalen Brome (penalty scored); Adam Majer (penalty scored)

October 23, 2011 Semifinal	Toronto Croatia	2–0	York Region Shooters	Toronto, Ontario
19:00	Josip Keran 7'; Fitzwilliams 34'	Report	Kadian Lecky 38', 61'; Goncalo Almeida 90'	Stadium: Centennial Park Stadium; Attendance: 175; Referee: Justin Tasev (OSA)

== Statistics ==
=== Goals ===
Correct as of October 5, 2011

Goals
Pos.	Playing Pos.	Nation	Name	Goals
1	FW	(Canada)	Kadian Lecky	15
2	FW	(Canada)	Jason De Thomasis	6
3	DF	(Canada)	Desmond Humphrey	5
4	DF	(Canada)	Dino Gardner	4
5	MF		Nico Martinez	2
5	MF		Mario Orestano	2
5	MF	(Canada)	Carlos Rivas Godoy	2
6	DF	(Jamaica)	Ricky Herron	1
6	DF	(Canada)	Taylor Lord	1
6	DF	(Trinidad and Tobago)	Rick Titus	1
6	DF		Chris Turner	1
Total				40
