= Federico Burguez =

Uruguayan footballer (born 1994)

Personal information
- Full name: Federico Burguez Vasilj
- Date of birth: 24 June 1994 (age 32)
- Place of birth: Ciudad de la Costa, Uruguay
- Position: Defender

Team information
- Current team: Huracán Buceo

Youth career
- 2010–2013: Peñarol

Senior career*
Years	Team	Apps	(Gls)
2015	York Region Shooters B		
2016	Canadian SC	1	(0)
2017	Rampla Juniors	0	(0)
2018–	Huracán Buceo		
- * Club domestic league appearances and goals as of January 25, 2019

Federico Burguez (born June 24, 1994) is a Uruguayan footballer playing with Huracán Buceo in the Uruguayan Segunda División Amateur.

== Playing career ==
Burguez played at the youth level with CA Penarol, Boston River, and El Tanque Sisley. In 2015, he played abroad in the Canadian Soccer League with York Region Shooters B. In 2016, he played in the Uruguayan Segunda División with Canadian SC. The following season he signed with Rampla Juniors, where he featured in the reserve squad. In 2018, he signed with Huracán Buceo in the Uruguayan Segunda División Amateur.
