= Bob de Klerk =

Dutch footballer and manager (born 1961)

Personal information
- Date of birth: 1961 (age 64–65)
- Place of birth: Amsterdam, Netherlands
- Positions: Forward; left winger

Senior career*
Years	Team	Apps	(Gls)
1980–1982	Telstar		
1982	K.S.V. Waregem		
1983	De Graafschap		

Managerial career
- Ajax A1
- 2011–2012: Toronto FC (First assistant)
- 2013: Ter Leede
- 2023–2024: Al Jazira (caretaker)
- * Club domestic league appearances and goals

Bob de Klerk (born 1961) is a Dutch football manager and former player.

== Playing career ==
De Klerk was born in Amsterdam. Having started his career with SC Telstar he played for K.S.V. Waregem in Belgium and De Graafschap in the Dutch Eredivise. He was forced into early retirement due to injury.

== Coaching career ==
De Klerk led the Ajax Saturday team to the Hoofdklasse. He also worked with the Ajax A1 youth team alongside Frank de Boer and led the team following de Boer's promotion to AFC Ajax manager.

In addition to his work at Ajax, de Klerk spent time with Ajax Cape Town in South Africa.

He spent nine years working in the Ajax youth system before moving to Major League Soccer. De Klerk joined Toronto FC on 6 January 2011 as First Assistant Coach along with former Ajax colleague Aron Winter who became Head Coach/Technical Director. On 14 May 2012, it was announced that de Klerk had been promoted to technical manager of Toronto with former player and academy coach Jim Brennan replacing him as assistant coach. It was announced on 7 January 2013 that de Klerk would not return to Toronto FC the following season.

In September 2013, after two months of managing Dutch Topklasse side Ter Leede, he became technical director at Dalian Aerbin F.C. of the Chinese Super League. In November 2014, he was appointed the Technical Director for York Region Shooters of the Canadian Soccer League.

Bob was also the Technical Director for Kleinburg Nobleton Soccer Club a small community-based club in Vaughan Ontario, a northern suburb of Toronto.

In 2019, he returned to the MLS, as an assistant coach under Frank de Boer for Atlanta United. The following season he mutually departed from the club along with de Boer's remaining coaching staff. In the summer of 2023, he was reunited with de Boer once more and joined his coaching staff as an assistant for Al Jazira in the United Emirate's Pro League. He was later elevated to the head coach position on an interim basis in December 2023. After one match his caretaker spell with Al Jazira ended as the club sign Mirel Rădoi in the winter of 2024.
