= Filipe Bento =

Angolan footballer and manager

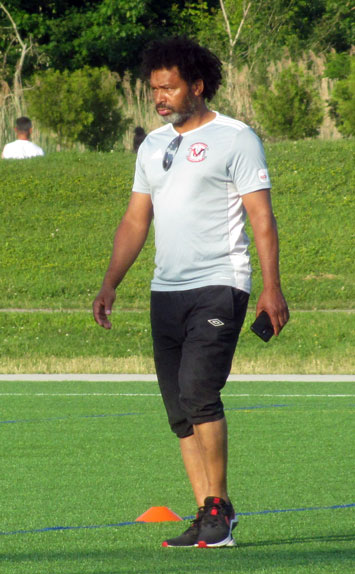
- Bento in 2022

Personal information
- Full name: Filipe Augusto Bento
- Date of birth: September 12, 1969 (age 57)
- Place of birth: Portuguese Angola
- Position: Midfielder

Senior career*
Years	Team	Apps	(Gls)
1993–1994	Espinho	7	(1)
1994–1995	Infesta	7	(1)
1995–1996	Lusitânia	27	(1)
1996–1998	Ovarense	57	(31)
1998–2000	Sanjoanense	50	(15)
2000–2002	São João de Ver	55	(5)
2002–2004	Valecambrense		
2004	Vaughan Shooters		

Managerial career
- 2010–2011: York Region Shooters
- 2022–: Unionville Milliken SC
- * Club domestic league appearances and goals as of December 23, 2016

Filipe Bento (born September 12, 1969) is a Portuguese former footballer and manager who played in the Segunda Liga, Segunda Divisão, Terceira Divisão, and the Canadian Professional Soccer League.

== Career ==
Bento began his career in 1993 with S.C. Espinho in the Segunda Liga. Throughout his time in Portugal he played in the Segunda Divisao with F.C. Infesta, Lusitânia F.C., A.D. Ovarense, and A.D. Sanjoanense. He also played in the Terceira Divisão with São João de Ver, and Valecambrense. In 2004, he went abroad to the Canadian Professional Soccer League to play with the Vaughan Shooters. In 2006, he retired from competitive football to serve as the assistant coach to the Shooters. In 2010, he was appointed the head coach for the organization, where he secured the Shooters a regular season title.
