= Taylor Lord =

Canadian soccer player and coach (born 1990)

Personal information
- Date of birth: May 30, 1990 (age 36)
- Place of birth: Scarborough, Ontario, Canada
- Height: 1.73 m (5 ft 8 in)
- Position: Defender

Youth career
- 2008–2009: Monaco

Senior career*
| Years | Team | Apps | (Gls) |
| 2009 | Portugal FC | 15 | (2) |
| 2010 | Serbian White Eagles | 10 | (0) |
| 2010 | SV Morlautern | | |
| 2011 | Toronto Lynx | 12 | (0) |
| 2011 | York Region Shooters | 5 | (1) |
| 2012–2013 | Dayton Dutch Lions | 13 | (0) |
| 2014–2017 | Durham United FC | 23 | (0) |
| 2018 | Darby FC | 1 | (0) |
| 2019 | Unionville Milliken SC | 1 | (0) |

International career
| 2009 | Canada U20 | 3 | (0) |
- * Club domestic league appearances and goals as of June 23, 2020

Taylor Lord (born May 30, 1990) is a Canadian soccer player and coach who serves as an assistant coach for the men's soccer program at Seneca College.

== Club career ==
Lord began his professional career with Portugal FC of the Canadian Soccer League (CSL) in 2008. The following season he signed with the Serbian White Eagles FC, making his debut on June 4, 2010, in a match against the York Region Shooters. In 2010, he had a brief stint abroad in Germany with SV Morlautern, before returning to North America to sign with the Toronto Lynx of the Premier Development League. The Lynx concluded the season by finishing seventh in the Great Lakes Division, thus failing to reach a postseason berth.

When the PDL season came to a conclusion Lord returned to the CSL and signed with York Region Shooters. He made his debut for the club on August 28, 2011, against St. Catharines Wolves where he recorded his first goal of the season in a 4–1 victory. In 2012, he signed a contract with the Dayton Dutch Lions of the USL Pro. On February 13, 2013 Dayton announced the re-signing of Lord for the 2013 season. The Lions reached the playoffs for the first time in their history in the USL Pro, but were playoff run came to an end with a 1-0 defeat to the Richmond Kickers in the quarterfinals.

In 2014, he played in League1 Ontario with Durham United FC. He later signed with Darby FC, and in 2019 played with Unionville Milliken SC.

== International career ==
Lord made his debut for the Canada U-20 men's national soccer team on September 26, 2009 against the Rwanda national under-20 football team at the 2009 Jeux de la Francophonie. In total he made three appearances for the national team.

== Managerial career ==
In 2015, he was appointed as an assistant coach for Seneca Sting. He is currently on the Technical Staff for DeRo United Futbol Academy.
