= Taurean Manders =

Bermudian footballer (born 1986)

Personal information
- Full name: Taurean Andre Manders
- Date of birth: July 9, 1986 (age 40)
- Place of birth: Hamilton, Bermuda
- Height: 5 ft 7 in (1.70 m)
- Positions: Midfielder; defender

Team information
- Current team: New Milton fc

Youth career
- North Village Rams
- 2005–2008: Iona Gaels

Senior career*
Years	Team	Apps	(Gls)
2008–2010	Bradenton Academics	38	(1)
2011	Capital City	24	(0)
2012	York Region Shooters	17	(3)
2013	Antigua Barracuda	21	(0)
2014	Bashley		
2014	Sholing		
2015–	Whitchurch United		

International career^{‡}
2003–	Bermuda	14	(1)
- * Club domestic league appearances and goals as of 21 February 2012 ‡ National team caps and goals as of 21 November 2011

Taurean Andre Manders (born 9 July 1986) is a Bermudian footballer who currently plays for the English club Whitchurch United.

== Club career ==
Manders came through the local side North Village Rams before joining the US college soccer team Iona Gaels for which he played for four years. He later moved to the American IMG Soccer Academy in Bradenton, Florida.

In May 2011, he joined Capital City F.C. in the Canadian Soccer League. The following season, in May 2012, Manders transferred to York Region Shooters.

In February 2014, Manders joined the English side Bashley, but left at the end of the season to join Sholing.

== International career ==
Manders made his debut for the Bermudian national team in a December 2003 friendly match against Barbados and had, by November 2015, earned 14 caps scored 1 goal. He has played in six FIFA World Cup qualification matches.

=== International goals ===
Scores and results list Bermuda's goal tally first.

N.	Date	Venue	Opponent	Score	Result	Competition	Refs
1.	11 September 2012	Stade Sylvio Cator, Port-au-Prince, Haiti	Saint Martin	5–0	8–0	2012 Caribbean Cup qualification	Report

== Personal life ==
He is the son of ex-Bermuda national team cricketer Andre Manders.
