= Ashton Bennett =

Jamaican footballer (born 1988)

Personal information
- Date of birth: 8 September 1988 (age 38)
- Place of birth: Clarendon, Jamaica
- Height: 1.75 m (5 ft 9 in)
- Position: Forward

Team information
- Current team: York Region Shooters

Youth career
- Portmore United
- 2009–2010: Cincinnati Surge
- 2011–2012: Coastal Carolina Chanticleers

Senior career*
Years	Team	Apps	(Gls)
2013	Toronto FC	0	(0)
2013–2014	Portmore United		
2015–	York Region Shooters		
- * Club domestic league appearances and goals as of 20 December 2013

Ashton Bennett (born 8 September 1988) is a Jamaican professional footballer who currently plays as a forward for York Region Shooters in the Canadian Soccer League.

== Career ==
=== Toronto FC ===
On 22 January 2013 Bennett was selected as the 20th overall pick in the 2013 MLS Supplemental Draft by Toronto FC. Then on 1 March 2013 it was announced that Bennett had officially signed with Toronto FC before the start of the 2013 MLS season. Bennett then made his professional debut for the team on 1 May 2013 against the Montreal Impact in the Canadian Championship in which he came on in the 74th minute for Jonathan Osorio as Toronto lost the match 6–0. On 14 May 2013, Bennett was waived by Toronto FC.

=== Portmore United ===
After being released by Toronto FC, Bennett signed for Portmore United F.C. of the National Premier League in his native Jamaica and scored his first goal for the club on 15 December 2013 in which his 35th-minute strike against Sporting Central Academy helped Portmore United to a 2–1 victory. In 2015, he returned to Canada to play in the Canadian Soccer League with the York Region Shooters.

== Career statistics ==
As of 1 May 2013

Club	Season	League		MLS Cup		Domestic Cup		CONCACAF		Total	
Club	Season	Apps	Goals	Apps	Goals	Apps	Goals	Apps	Goals	Apps	Goals
Toronto FC	2013	0	0	0	0	1	0	0	0	1	0
Toronto FC	Total	0	0	0	0	1	0	0	0	1	0
Career total		0	0	0	0	1	0	0	0	1	0
