= Xavi Pérez =

Spanish footballer

Personal information
- Full name: Francisco Javier Pérez Pérez
- Date of birth: 26 February 1984 (age 42)
- Place of birth: Santa Margarida, Spain
- Height: 1.81 m (5 ft 11 in)
- Position: Centre back

Youth career
- San Mauro
- 2001–2003: Manresa

Senior career*
Years	Team	Apps	(Gls)
2003–2006	Manresa	90	(6)
2006–2009	Santboià	85	(5)
2009–2010	Kitchee	23	(3)
2010–2011	Persijap Jepara	16	(3)
2011–2012	Pro Duta	20	(3)
2012–2014	York Shooters	22	(4)
2014–2015	Gavà	18	(0)
2015–2016	Martinenc	?	(1)
Total			(25)
- * Club domestic league appearances and goals

Francisco Javier 'Xavi' Pérez Pérez (born 26 February 1984) is a Spanish former footballer. Mainly a central defender, he also played as a defensive midfielder.
