= Nicola Di Sanza =

Italian footballer

Personal information
- Date of birth: 27 January 1990 (age 36)
- Place of birth: Taranto, Italy
- Position: Forward

Senior career*
Years	Team	Apps	(Gls)
2007–2008	Potenza		(6)
2008–2011	Francavilla		(6)
2012	Real Metapontino		(8)
2013	York Region Shooters B		(22)
2012-2013	Tursi		(7)
2014–2015	Rotunda Maris		(53)
2015–2016	York Region Shooters		
2016	Atlántico		
2016–2017	Santarcangiolese		(15)
2017	York Region Shooters		
2017–2018	Santarcangiolese		(17)
2018–2019	Paternicum		(12)
2019–2020	Santarcangiolese		(18)
2021–	Corleto Perticara		(27)

International career
- Italy (minifootball)
- * Club domestic league appearances and goals

Nicola Di Sanza (born 27 January 1990) is an Italian footballer playing with asd Corleto perticara in the Promozione.

== Playing career ==
Di Sanza played in Serie D with F.C. Francavilla in 2008. In 2012, he played with A.S.D. Real Metapontino in the Eccellenza. He played abroad in the Canadian Soccer League with the York Region Shooters. He returned home in 2014 to play with ASD Rotunda Maris in the Promozione. He returned to the Canadian Soccer League for the 2015 season.

In 2016, he was transferred to Atlántico FC in the Liga Dominicana de Fútbol, where he played in the 2016 CFU Club Championship. Shortly after his contract was terminated he returned to the York Region Shooters for the remainder of the 2016 season. In 2017, he returned home to play with Santarcangiese, and in 2018 was signed by Paternicum.
