= Matthew O'Connor (soccer) =

Canadian soccer player

Matt O'Connor
Personal information
- Full name: Matthew O'Connor
- Date of birth: April 29, 1984 (age 42)
- Place of birth: Mississauga, Ontario, Canada
- Height: 1.80 m (5 ft 11 in)
- Position: Midfielder

Youth career
- 1991–1993: Mississauga SC
- 1994–1999: Brampton SC
- 2000–2001: Dixie SC

Senior career*
Years	Team	Apps	(Gls)
2001	Glen Shields Sun Devils		
2002–2004	Hamilton Thunder		
2002	→ Calgary Storm (loan)	4	(0)
2004	→ Toronto Lynx (loan)	6	(0)
2005	Club Valencia		
2006	Oakville Blue Devils	19	(1)
2007	Vaughan Shooters	20	(0)
2008	Brampton Lions	12	(0)
2008	Royal Racing FC Montegnee	16	(4)
2009–2010	Integrál-DAC	6	(0)
2010	Palm Beach SC		
2010	York Region Shooters		

International career
2000–2001	Canada U-17	4	(0)
2002–2003	Canada U-20	2	(0)
- * Club domestic league appearances and goals

Matthew O'Connor (born April 29, 1984) is a Canadian former soccer player who played in the Canadian Professional Soccer League, USL A-League, Dhivehi League, Nemzeti Bajnokság II, and the USL Premier Development League.

== Career ==
O'Connor began his college career with the Ottawa Gee-Gees, before joining Erin Mills SC. He began his professional career in 2001 with Glen Shields Sun Devils in the Canadian Professional Soccer League. In 2002, he signed a contract with Hamilton Thunder. On June 29, 2002 he was loaned to the Calgary Storm of the USL A-League. In 2003, he helped Hamilton clinch their first Western Conference title, and secured a postseason berth. On July 30, 2004, marked his return to the USL being loaned out to the Toronto Lynx where he appeared in six matches.

In 2005, he went abroad to Maldives to sign with Club Valencia of the Dhivehi League. The following season he returned to the CSL to sign with the Oakville Blue Devils. During his tenure with Oakville he secured the National Division title. In 2007, he was transferred to the Italia Shooters, and played briefly with Brampton Lions in 2008. In July 2008, he joined Royal Racing FC Montegnee, playing his first match on 24 August 2008. On 24 July 2009, he signed a contract with Integrál-DAC. In 2010, he returned to North America to play with Palm Beach SC, and the York Region Shooters.

His brother Miles O'Connor also plays football.
