= Carlos Rivas (soccer, born 1985) =

Canadian soccer player (born 1985)

Personal information
- Full name: Carlos Adan Rivas Godoy
- Date of birth: 3 September 1985 (age 41)
- Place of birth: Toronto, Ontario, Canada
- Height: 1.80 m (5 ft 11 in)
- Position: Midfielder

Youth career
- 2004–2005: Cruz Azul

Senior career*
Years	Team	Apps	(Gls)
2006–2007	Deportes La Serena	28	(3)
2008	Municipal Iquique	18	(3)
2009–2010	Universidad de Concepción	23	(0)
2011–2012	York Region Shooters		

International career
2004	Canada U20	2	(0)
2010	Canada	1	(0)
- * Club domestic league appearances and goals

Carlos Adan Rivas Godoy (born 3 September 1985) is a Canadian former professional soccer player who played as a midfielder in the Chilean Primera División, Primera B de Chile, and the Canadian Soccer League.

== Club career ==
Rivas began his career in Mexico with Cruz Azul and joined after one year to the first division Chilean team Deportes La Serena where he became a recognizable figure in the sports throughout Chile. Carlo was a starter in the squad and became numerous times the recipient of the best player of the week. An award granted by the Chilean press where they vote on the top players for their respective positions. After just one year left as Jose Sulantay, the U/20 World Cup Coach and the recipient of Chilean Coach of the year award in 2007 had made a personal request to bring him to Iquique. He signed in January 2008 for Municipal Iquique. Rivas played here Municipal Iquique, until Sulantay announced his resignation, at that time Rivas scored the goal in which Sulantay announced that Carlo was a force to be reckoned with and subsequently referred him to Universidad de Concepción. In 2011, he returned to Canada to play with the York Region Shooters in the Canadian Soccer League.

== International career ==
Rivas is also former member of the Canada U-20 men's national soccer team he played two games in a friendly tournament in July 2004. His international career began at the age of 14 where he participated in the Monterrey Cup in Mexico in which he represented the Canadian delegation through the Carlos Rivas Soccer School. Rivas has played worldwide in tournaments prior to his professional career. He also mentioned his love for Canada and his desire to play for the Canada national team.

In 2010, Carlos was called up for the Canada men's national soccer team. His announcement was made in January 2010. He played his first match for the national team as a second-half substitute in a friendly against Jamaica on 31 January 2010.

== Personal life ==
His father is the former Chilean footballer Carlos Rivas who had a distinguished career at Colo-Colo and played for Chile in the 1982 FIFA World Cup. From his maternal line, his grandfather is Adán Godoy, a Chilean former international goalkeeper who coincided with his father in Santiago Morning in 1977.
