= Richard West (footballer) =

Jamaican footballer (born 1985)

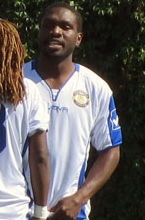
- West in 2011

Personal information
- Full name: Richard West
- Date of birth: 19 July 1985 (age 41)
- Place of birth: Jamaica
- Position: Forward

Senior career*
Years	Team	Apps	(Gls)
2002–2004	Santos F.C.		
2004–2005	Waterhouse F.C.		
2005–2006	Harbour View F.C.		
2006–2007	Tivoli Gardens F.C.		
2007–2010	Scotiabank Football Club		
2011	Brampton United	25	(17)
2012	Serbian White Eagles	19	(15)
2013–2017	York Region Shooters	67	(64)
2018	Unionville Milliken SC	8	(3)

International career
2002	Jamaica U20	3	(3)
2004	Jamaica	2	(1)
- * Club domestic league appearances and goals

Richard West (born 19 July 1985) is a former Jamaican footballer who played as a forward.

== Club career ==
=== Youth ===
West played his youth football with Kingston College in 2001.

=== Jamaica ===
West began playing in the KSAFA Super League with Santos F.C. in 2002. In his debut season, he helped Santos win the league title after defeating Boys' Town, with West providing the goal in overtime. He re-signed with Santos for the 2003 season. West helped Santos reach the championship final for the second consecutive season and scored the winning goal against Harbour View. In late 2003, he re-signed with the club for his third season.

In September 2004, he played in the country's top-flight league with Waterhouse. The following season, he signed with league rivals Harbour View. In his debut season with Harbour View, he assisted the team in finishing second in the regular season standings.

After a season with Harbour View, he joined league rivals Tivoli Gardens in 2006. In 2008, he played with the Scotiabank Football Club in the KSAFA lower leagues. West helped Scotiabank win the league title in 2009. In 2010, he won his second league title with Scotiabank and finished as the club's top goalscorer.

=== Canada ===
West ventured abroad to play in the Canadian Soccer League with Brampton City United in 2011. In his debut season in the Canadian circuit, he finished as the club's top goal scorer and second in the league scoring charts with 17 goals. He helped Brampton secure a playoff berth by finishing fourth in the league's first division. Brampton's playoff campaign concluded in the opening round after losing the two-game series to the Serbian White Eagles.

After a season with Brampton, he signed with league rivals the Serbian White Eagles. West would finish once more at the top of the league scoring charts, finishing fourth with 15 goals. He helped the Serbs clinch a postseason berth by finishing sixth. West produced the winning goal against SC Toronto in the quarterfinal round, which advanced the club to the next round. The Serbs were eliminated from the competition in the following round by Toronto Croatia.

=== York Region Shooters ===
The following season, he was transferred to the York Region Shooters. West would finish at the top of the league scoring charts for the third consecutive season as the club's top goal scorer with 19 goals. The Vaughan-based club would secure a playoff berth by finishing as runners-up in the division. Their playoff run ended in the first round after a defeat by London City.

West re-signed with Vaughan for the 2014 season. He helped the Shooters produce a perfect season by initially securing the divisional title. In the preliminary round of the postseason, he contributed a goal against his former team, Brampton, which helped advance the club to the next round. Their opponents in the next round were the North York Astros, whom they defeated. He appeared in the championship final and scored the equalizing goal against Toronto Croatia that sent the match to a penalty shootout, where York Region would win the title.

York Region re-signed West for his third season in 2015. West finished the campaign as the league's top goal scorer with 23 goals. He also assisted the club in securing a playoff berth by finishing third in the division. West produced a hat trick in the quarterfinal match against Burlington SC that helped advance the club to the next round. In the semifinal round, Vaughan was eliminated from the tournament by Toronto Croatia. The 2016 season marked his fourth year with the Vaughan-based club. In his fourth season, he helped the club secure the divisional title. York Region defeated Milton SC in the playoff quarterfinals, where West contributed a goal. Their playoff run ended in the following round after a defeat by Hamilton City. His final run with the Shooters was in the 2017 season. York Region won the championship title after defeating Scarborough SC.

In 2018, he played with Unionville Milliken SC.

== International career ==
He was named to the Jamaica national under-20 football team that played in the 2003 CONCACAF U-20 Tournament qualifying round. He played against Puerto Rico on August 30, 2002, where he recorded a goal. West made his second appearance in the tournament against the Cayman Islands and scored another goal. His final match was against Haiti where he scored Jamaica's lone goal in a 2–1 loss.

West was selected to represent the Jamaica national football team and debuted on October 2, 2004, against Guatemala in a friendly match. He made his second and final appearance for the senior team in the 2005 Caribbean Cup against Saint Martin. In the tournament's opening match, he recorded his first goal for the senior team on November 24, 2004, in a 12–0 victory. Ultimately, the senior team would qualify for the 2005 CONCACAF Gold Cup by winning the tournament.

== Honors ==
Santos F.C.

- KSAFA Super League: 2002–03, 2003–04

York Region Shooters

- CSL Championship: 2014, 2017
- Canadian Soccer League First Division: 2014, 2016

Individual

- Canadian Soccer League Golden Boot: 2015
