= Wilson Martínez =

Dominican footballer

Personal information
- Full name: Wilson Martínez
- Date of birth: July 28, 1986 (age 40)
- Place of birth: Puerto Plata, Dominican Republic
- Position: Defender

Senior career*
Years	Team	Apps	(Gls)
2012–2013	Moca FC		
2013–2014	York Region Shooters		
2015–2016	Atlántico FC		

International career
2008	Dominican Republic	1	(0)
- * Club domestic league appearances and goals as of December 23, 2016

Wilson Martínez (born July 28, 1986) is a Dominican former footballer who played in the Liga Dominicana de Fútbol, and the Canadian Soccer League.

== Career ==
Martínez began his career in 2012 with Moca FC in the Liga Dominicana de Fútbol, where he won the league title in his debut season. In 2013, he went overseas to Canada to play with the York Region Shooters in the Canadian Soccer League. During his tenure with York Region he achieved an undefeated season in 2014, where he won the CSL Championship. In 2015, he returned to the Dominican and signed with Atlántico FC.

== International career ==
He made his debut for the Dominican Republic national football team on February 28, 2008, against Haiti.
