= Richard Edwards (footballer) =

Jamaican footballer (born 1983)

Personal information
- Date of birth: April 15, 1983 (age 43)
- Place of birth: Jamaica
- Position: Midfielder

Senior career*
Years	Team	Apps	(Gls)
2004–2005	Waterhouse F.C.		
2006–2012	Harbour View		
2012	Mikkelin Palloilijat	6	(1)
2012–2013	Harbour View F.C.		
2013–2017	York Region Shooters	69	(10)
2018	Unionville Milliken SC	13	(0)
2019	Master's Futbol	2	(0)

International career
2007–2012	Jamaica	36	(0)
- * Club domestic league appearances and goals

Richard Edwards (born April 15, 1983) is a Jamaican former professional footballer and serves on the technical staff for Brampton Soccer Club.

== Playing career ==
Edwards began his career in 2004 with Waterhouse F.C. in the National Premier League. In 2006, he signed with Harbour View F.C., and won the league title in 2007, 2010, and the 2007 CFU Club Championship. In 2012, he went overseas to Finland to sign with Mikkelin Palloilijat in the Kakkonen. At the conclusion of the season he returned home to sign with Harbour View.

In 2013, he went abroad to Canada to sign with the York Region Shooters of the Canadian Soccer League. During his tenure with York Region he won the CSL Championship in 2014, 2017, along with the league title in 2014, and 2016. In 2018, he played in League1 Ontario for Unionville Milliken SC, and with Master's Futbol in 2019.

Edwards played with the Jamaica national team, where he featured in 36 matches.

== Managerial career ==
In 2018, he formed his own training school for soccer known as Touch of Class Soccer. On May 26, 2020, Brampton Soccer Club named him to the technical staff for the under-12, 13, and 15 women's soccer program.

== Honours ==
Jamaica

- Caribbean Cup: 2010

Harbour View

- Jamaica National Premier League: 2007, 2010, 2013
- CFU Club Championship: 2007

York Region Shooters

- Canadian Soccer League First Division: 2014, 2016
- CSL Championship: 2014, 2017
