= Darryl Gomez =

Trinidadian footballer (born 1977)

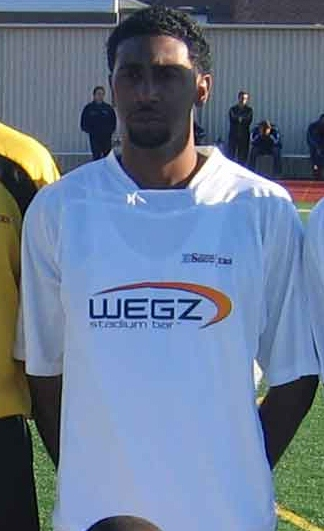
- Gomez in 2005

Personal information
- Full name: Darryl Evan George Gómez
- Date of birth: October 21, 1977 (age 49)
- Place of birth: San Fernando, Trinidad and Tobago
- Height: 5 ft 10 in (1.78 m)
- Position: Midfielder

College career
Years	Team	Apps	(Gls)
1996–2000	Winthrop Eagles		

Senior career*
Years	Team	Apps	(Gls)
1999	Oshawa Flames		
2000	Richmond Kickers	8	(0)
2000–2001	Buffalo Blizzard (indoor)	10	(1)
2001	Toronto Lynx	17	(0)
2002–2004	Metro Lions		
2002	→ Toronto Supra (loan)		
2005	Vaughan Shooters		
2007	Canadian Lions		
2008	Serbian White Eagles		
2009–2010	Italia/York Region Shooters		
2011	Serbian White Eagles		
2012–2013	York Region Shooters		

International career
2000	Trinidad and Tobago U23	1	(0)
2001–2004	Saint Kitts and Nevis	15	(1)

Managerial career
- 2014: York Region Shooters
- * Club domestic league appearances and goals as of August 20, 2018

Darryl Gomez (born October 21, 1977) is a Trinidadian-Kittitian former footballer and manager. Gomez began playing football at the college level in 1996 with the Winthrop Eagles. After his completing his scholarship in 2000 he played in the USL A-League with the Richmond Kickers, and the Toronto Lynx. Following his time in the A-League and NPSL he played in the Canadian Professional Soccer League (later renamed Canadian Soccer League) with several different clubs, and would eventually conclude his playing career in the league. Throughout his tenure within the CPSL/CSL his most notable accolade was winning the CSL Championship in 2008 with the Serbian White Eagles.

After retiring with the York Region Shooters he was appointed the head coach for the organization in 2014. In his first year as head coach he achieved a perfect season along with the CSL Championship.

Gomez also played at the international level originally with the Trinidad and Tobago U23. In 2001, he later switched his national commitments to the Saint Kitts and Nevis national football team.

== Playing career ==
Gomez began his professional career in the Canadian Professional Soccer League with the Oshawa Flames in 1999, making his debut on May 30 in a match against Glen Shields Sun Devils. In 2000, he went abroad to the United States to play for the Richmond Kickers of the USL A-League. In the winter of 2000 he played in the National Professional Soccer League with the Buffalo Blizzard. In 2001, he returned to Canada to play with the Toronto Lynx, where he played in 17 matches. After a season in USL A-League he returned to resume play in the CPSL with the Scarborough based Metro Lions.

He was loaned to league rivals Toronto Supra for the remainder of the 2002 season. In 2004, he was selected for the CPSL All-Star team against Boavista F.C. He would continue playing in the CPSL between the Serbian White Eagles, Vaughan Shooters, and the Canadian Lions. In his first tenure with the Serbian White Eagles in 2008 he assisted in securing the CSL Championship. He finished his career with the York Region Shooters, and assisted in clinching the First Division title in 2010.

== International career ==
Gomez made his debut for the Saint Kitts and Nevis national football team on May 16, 2001 against Haiti. He featured in the CONCACAF 2006 FIFA World Cup qualification rounds where he recorded his first international goal against Barbados on June 19, 2004. He also participated in the 2001 Caribbean Cup, and 2005 Caribbean Cup.

== Managerial career ==
In 2014, he made the transition from player to head coach for the York Region Shooters. In his debut season as head coach Gomez managed to achieve an undefeated season which led to York Region clinching the First Division title. The achievement marked a new milestone as York Region became the third club in CSL history to go undefeated; the first being the Toronto Olympians, and the second being the Ottawa Wizards. He managed to add the CSL Championship by defeating runners up Toronto Croatia in a penalty shootout. At the conclusion of the season, Gomez was awarded the CSL Coach of the Year award.

In 2016, he became the head coach for G.S. United men's elite team in the Ontario Soccer League.

== Managerial stats ==
Team	Nat	From	To	Record				
Team	Nat	From	To	G	W	L	D	Win %
York Region Shooters	(Canada)	25 May 2014	2015	18	13	0	5	72.22

== Honours ==
=== Player ===
Vaughan/York Region Shooters

- Canadian Soccer League Eastern Conference: 2005
- Canadian Soccer League First Division: 2010

Serbian White Eagles

- CSL Championship: 2008

=== Manager ===
York Region Shooters

- CSL Championship: 2014
- Canadian Soccer League First Division: 2014
