= Ricky Herron =

Jamaican footballer (born 1986)

Personal information
- Date of birth: June 16, 1986 (age 40)
- Place of birth: Jamaica
- Position: Defender

Senior career*
Years	Team	Apps	(Gls)
2007	California Victory	3	(0)
2011–2016	York Region Shooters		
- * Club domestic league appearances and goals as of October 16, 2018

Ricky Herron (born June 16, 1986) is a Jamaican footballer who has played in the USL First Division, and Canadian Soccer League.

== Playing career ==
Herron played in the USL First Division in 2007 with California Victory, where he appeared in three matches. In 2011, he played in the Canadian Soccer League with the York Region Shooters. He recorded his first goal for the club on August 21, 2011, against TFC Academy. In 2016 he featured in the CSL Championship match against Toronto Croatia, and helped secured the championship after a 5–4 victory in a penalty shootout.
