= Dino Gardner =

Canadian soccer player (born 1993)

Personal information
- Full name: Dino Roberto Gardner
- Date of birth: June 18, 1993 (age 33)
- Place of birth: Toronto, Ontario, Canada
- Height: 1.80 m (5 ft 11 in)
- Position: Defender

Youth career
- 1998–2003: Wallace Emerson CC
- 2006–2007: Wexford SC
- 2008–2011: Toronto FC

College career
Years	Team	Apps	(Gls)
2014–2015	Humber Hawks	8	(2)

Senior career*
Years	Team	Apps	(Gls)
2009–2010	Toronto FC Academy		
2011	York Region Shooters		
2012	FC Edmonton	2	(0)
2013	Atak Sports	2	(0)
2014	York Region Shooters		

International career
2011	Canada U-18	2	(0)
2012	Canada U-20	1	(0)
- * Club domestic league appearances and goals

Dino Roberto Gardner (born June 18, 1993) is a Canadian soccer player.

== Early career ==
Gardner started his career with five years in the Wallace Emerson House League. He played than in the youth teams of Wexford SC and was part of the local Ontario Under 16 squad.

== Professional career ==
He spent some time in the Canadian Soccer League with the Toronto FC Academy. In 2011, he left Toronto FC and joined fellow CSL team York Region Shooters.

In 2012, he joined NASL club FC Edmonton, signing a one-year contract with an option. where he made two appearances in 2012. At the end of the season, after only playing two games for FC Edmonton, he was released.

He then signed with Atak Sports. In 2014, he returned to his former club the York Region Shooters.

Afterwards, he attended Humber College playing for the men's soccer team.

== International career ==
Gardner played two games for the U-18 and one game for the Canadian U-20.

In February 2011, he was called up to a camp with the Jamaica U20 team.

== Personal life ==
He attended the Humberside Collegiate Institute and played until his graduating 2011 Basketball and Soccer for the Huskies. His parents immigrated in the late 80s from Jamaica, his father, David, was a former Jamaican footballer from Manchester, Jamaica and his mother, Elaine, was a high jumper Elaine, who was originally from St. Mary, Jamaica.
