= St. Joan of Arc Catholic High School =

Location
- 1 Saint Joan of Arc Avenue; Maple, Ontario, L6A 1W9; Canada; 43°51′34″N 79°31′10″W

Information
- School type: High school
- Motto: En esprit et en vérité (In spirit and in truth)
- Religious affiliation: Roman Catholic
- Founded: 1993
- School board: York Catholic District School Board
- Superintendent: Joel Chiutsi
- Area trustee: Angela Saggese
- School number: 801259
- Principal: Chad Garel
- Grades: 9-12
- Enrolment: 1198 (2020)
- Language: English
- Colours: Red, Black, White
- Team name: Thunder
- Website: stjo.ycdsb.ca

St. Joan of Arc Catholic High School (also referred to as SJA) is a high school in Maple, Ontario, Canada, located in the city of Vaughan. It is administered by the York Catholic District School Board. Its student population is primarily composed of residents of Maple and other parts of northeastern Vaughan.

== Notable alumni ==
- Massimo Bertocchi, a decathlete who competed in the 2008 Beijing Olympics, placing 19th.
- Melanie Fiona, a musician who has won two Grammy Awards
- Franco Lalli, a professional soccer player

== See also ==
- Education in Ontario
- List of secondary schools in Ontario
