= York Region Shooters =

Canadian soccer team

- Full name: York Region Shooters
- Nickname: The Shooters
- Founded: 2003 (as Vaughan Sun Devils)
- Stadium: St. Joan of Arc Turf Field; Vaughan, Ontario, Canada
- Capacity: 1,000
- Chairman: Tony De Thomasis
- Head coach: Sam Medeiros
- League: Canadian Soccer League
- 2022: Regular season: 2nd Playoffs: Semifinals
- Website: http://www.yorkregionshooters.com/
Home colours	Away colours

York Region Shooters is a Canadian soccer team, that plays in the Canadian Soccer League. The Shooters played their home games at the St. Joan of Arc Turf Field in the City of Vaughan, Ontario. The team's colours were blue and white, mirroring those of the Italy national team and reflecting the cultural heritage of the club. The club had also competed under various different names as Vaughan Sun Devils, Vaughan Shooters, Italia Shooters, and finally as York Region Shooters.

They were formed in 2003 as the merger of two rival clubs in York Region: the Glen Shields Sun Devils and the original York Region Shooters. Both clubs were inaugural members of the Canadian Professional Soccer League, having joined in 1998. The merger produced a string of success as the club became a powerhouse within the league. Notable achievements were going undefeated in an entire season, establishing a CSL record for most regular season titles, and winning the CSL Championship three times in 2006, 2014 and 2017.

== History ==
=== Merger and emergence as a league powerhouse (2003–2005) ===
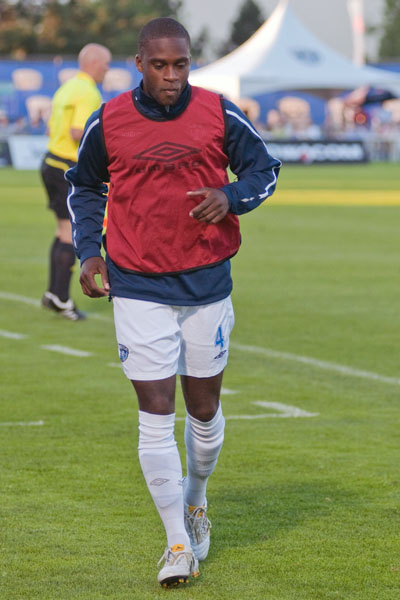
Canadian international Chris Williams began his career with Glen Shields Sun Devils.

In 2003, Glen Shields merged with the York Region Shooters and united the York Region territory under principal owner Tony De Thomasis. The new additions added to the roster were Canadian international Elvis Thomas, Matthew Palleschi, Cameron Medwin, and Jason De Thomasis. The merger proved a success as Vaughan recorded an eight-game undefeated streak and clinched the final playoff in their conference. In the first round they faced Toronto Supra, where they defeated Supra with 4 goals to 3 with Wilson Hugo, Smith, Thomas, and Aundrea Rollins providing the goals. In the next round the Sun Devils faced Western Conference champions the Hamilton Thunder, and beat the odds by recording a 2–0 victory to mark their first appearance in the CPSL Championship. Their opponents in the finals were Brampton Hitmen during the match Vaughan's Chris Turner was ejected from the match which gave Brampton the advantage to win the championship by a score of 1–0. Despite the defeat the merger ushered in a new era for the club in becoming a powerhouse within the CPSL.

Several changes were made in 2004 as the club was renamed the Vaughan Shooters and transferred their home venue to the Ontario Soccer Centre. Head coach Benning parted ways in order to accept a position with the CSA, and Sam Mederios was named his successor. Vaughan also established an affiliation with two youth clubs Woodbridge Italia and Vaughan Soccer Club. For the second straight year the Shooters clinched the final playoff berth in their conference with the third best offensive and defensive record. In the preliminary round of the playoffs they faced the Metro Lions and blitz them 5–3. The second round was a similar outcome where Vaughan defeat the Eastern Conference champions Toronto Supra 4–1. The championship finals featured Vaughan against Toronto Croatia, where the Shooters fell 4–0.

In 2005, Carmine Isacco was given head coach responsibilities and brought in Saint Kitts and Nevis international Darryl Gomez, Stuart Black, and Brian Bowes. Throughout the season Vaughan consolidated their status as a powerhouse by claiming their first piece of silverware the Eastern Conference title. Vaughan achieved a team best by posting the best offensive and defensive record. As division champions they received an automatic bye to the semifinals, where they thrashed Toronto Croatia by a score of 4–0. In their third championship final appearance they faced the Oakville Blue Devils, but once again fell short 2–1 in extra time. At the conclusion of the season the league honored Desmond Humphrey with the CPSL MVP award, and Tony De Thomasis with the CPSL President award.

=== First championship and consistent playoff appearances (2006–2013) ===
On September 15, 2005, the league announced the creation of the International Division for the 2006 season with Vaughan joining the division as Italia Shooters in order to represent and to celebrate the club's strong Italian heritage. Further changes were made in the managerial office with team owner De Thomasis undertaking the coaching duties. Italia managed to acquire a postseason berth by finishing third in a highly competitive division. The club received some luck early on in the playoffs as they advanced to the next round by a forfeit from the Brampton Stallions. Their opponents in the semifinals were Toronto Croatia, and with a goal from Jason De Thomasis they reached the championship final for the fourth consecutive year. Their opposition were the International Division champions Serbian White Eagles FC a team where the majority of players had European experience. During the match Italia performed the miracle needed at Esther Shiner Stadium from a lone goal from Anthony Adur to claim their first CSL Championship in a 1–0 victory. De Thomasis was recognized with the CSL Coach of the Year award.

For the 2007 season Italia finished third in their division with the third best offensive record, and maintained the best defensive record. Unfortunately Italia failed to defend their championship after losing 3–0 to Trois-Rivières Attak in the first round of the playoffs. In preparations for the coming 2008 season the club hired Vito Colanglo as general manager and moved their home venue to Joan of Arc Turf Field. The organization also reached an agreement with the Toronto Lynx of the Premier Development League in order to develop and break players into the professional ranks. Isacco was brought back in to manage the squad and strengthened the roster with David Diplacido, Frank Jonke, Rick Titus, Marco Terminesi, Jamaal Smith, Murphy Wiredu, Jon Paul Piques, and Richard Asante. The additions paid off as Italia secured their second division title and had the best offensive record. In the quarterfinals the Shooters defeated Brampton Lions FC 1–0. Their playoff run came to a conclusion in the next round against Serbia, where the White Eagles defeated them 3–0.

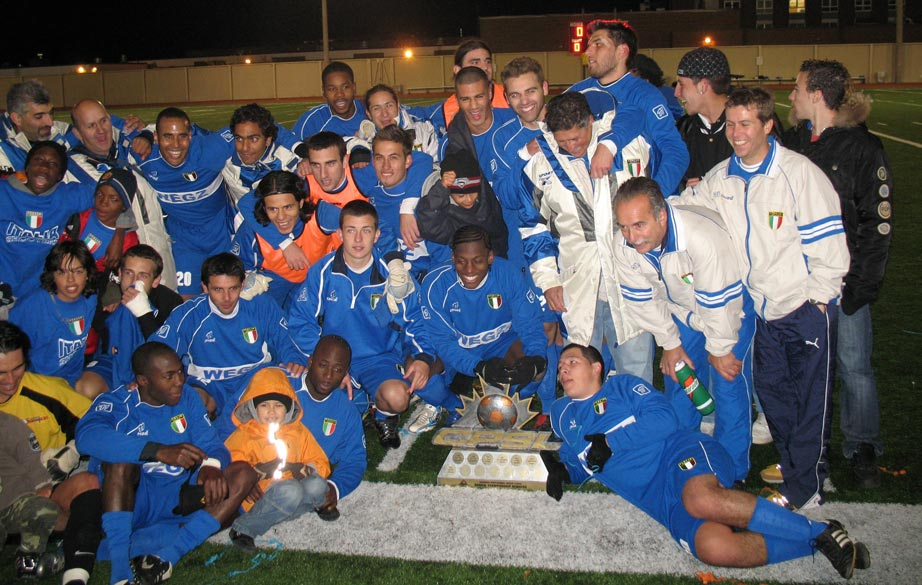
Italia Shooters celebrating CSL Championship in 2006.

In 2009, Woodbridge S.C., and Unionville S.C. became associated with Italia and operated as the club's reserve teams in the CSL Reserve Division. In the regular season the Shooters had a mediocre season, but still managed to clinch a postseason berth by finishing third in their division. In the postseason Italia revived their team performance by defeating St. Catharines in a two-game series with 7–1 goals on aggregate. In the next round they faced the National Division champions Trois-Rivieres where in both games they tied the series 4–4 on aggregate with the Attak scoring the winning goal in overtime. The CSL administration restructured the league by combining both divisions to form the CSL First Division. As a result of the changes the club changed its name to York Region Shooters, reflecting the previous merger in 2003 and the larger area of York Region the club has played in and represents. Filipe Bento took over the reign of head coach and clinched the club's third regular season championship by finishing first in the standings. Their postseason journey came to an abrupt end after losing 3–1 on goals on aggregate to Toronto Croatia. At the conclusion of the season De Thomasis received the Harry Paul Gauss award, while Titus was awarded the CSL Defender of the Year award.

During the 2011 and 2012 seasons York Region went through the services of Brian Bowes, and John Pacione as head coaches. Notable players around that period were Taylor Lord, Carlos Riva, Dino Gardner, Adrian Butters, Julian Uccello, and Taurean Manders. The Shooters qualified for the postseason for both seasons. In 2011, York defeated regular season champions SC Toronto in the quarterfinals, but were defeated in the second round by Toronto Croatia. While in 2012, York Region defeated Windsor Star in the first round only to be eliminated in the next round against Montreal Impact Academy. York Region finished the 2013 season on a positive note by finishing second in the standings with Jamaican internationals Richard West, and Richard Edwards being added to the roster. Their opposition in the playoffs were London City where York Region lost the match in a penalty shootout.

=== Undefeated season and league dominance (2014–2017) ===
The 2014 season was a historic season for the franchise as the club achieved an undefeated season. Becoming the third club in the league's history to reach this milestone the others being Toronto Olympians, and the Ottawa Wizards. In the postseason York Region eliminated Brampton United by a score of 3–0 in the first round. In the semifinal the Shooters defeated North York Astros from a single goal from Hector Mackie. After a 5–4 victory in a penalty shootout York Region defeated Toronto Croatia to claim their second CSL Championship, and completed the entire season undefeated. For their efforts the CSL awarded former York Region player Darryl Gomez with the CSL Coach of the Year award, and Adrian Ibanez with the CSL D2 Goalkeeper of the Year. York Region also established a working relationship with Winstars Soccer Academy, which served as a reserve team in the CSL Second Division. In November 2014, former Jong Ajax coach Bob de Klerk was appointed the Technical Director for the club.

York Region had a solid 2015 season by securing a postseason berth by finishing third in the standings with the second best offensive record. Notable imports brought in were Steven McDougall, Aleksandar Stojanovski, David Schipper, Ashton Bennett, Wilson Martinez, and Adrian Pena. The Shooters faced Burlington SC in the quarterfinals and advanced to the next round after a 4–2 victory. Their playoff journey came to a conclusion after losing 3–2 to Toronto Croatia. At the CSL awards banquet Richard West received the CSL Golden Boot, while Cyndy De Thomasis was honored with the Harry Paul Gauss award.

The Shooter's roster was strengthened for the 2016 season with the additions of Hayden Fitzwilliams, Nicholas Lindsay, Halburto Harris, David Guzman, Shawn Brown, and the return of Anthony Adur. The season marked another achievement for the York Region club as they captured their fifth regular season championship, thus establishing a CSL record for most regular season titles. They also achieved a team milestone by recording their best defensive record allowing only 10 goals a record not matched since the Ottawa Wizards in the 2003 CPSL season. In their playoff run the Maple-based club defeated Milton SC 5–0. In the semifinal the Shooters suffered a crushing 2–1 defeat in a penalty shootout to Hamilton City SC. Meanwhile, in the Second Division their reserve team captured their first CSL D2 Championship after defeating Toronto Atomic B by a score of 2–1.

The Shooters won the 2017 Canadian Soccer League season championship for a third time with a 5–4 penalty shoot-out win over Scarborough SC after a 1–1 draw.

== Roster ==
As of June 14, 2022

Note: Flags indicate national team as defined under FIFA eligibility rules; some limited exceptions apply. Players may hold more than one non-FIFA nationality.

No.	Pos.	Nation	Player
—	FW		Hassan Abdulmumini
—	DF		Faris Abubaker
—	FW	GUY	Shaq Agard
—	MF	CAN	Devonte Brown
—	FW		Darren Chambers
—	DF		Sabree Doka
—	GK		Luke Ewen
—	MF		Amjad Faragallh
—	MF		Augusto Flores
—	GK		Daniel Gosciniak
—	GK		Trae Green
—	MF		Osman Hussein
—	DF		Abubahar Hussein
—	MF		Mustapha Kuru

No.	Pos.	Nation	Player
—	DF		Gabriel Lima
—	DF		Carlex Mbobda
—	MF		Mahmoud Mehdi
—	MF		Sadrettin Memedovski
—	MF		Zuheib Mohamed
—	DF		Odilon Nguemou
—	DF		Luis Nieves
—	GK		Gieson Njehia
—	MF		Michael Nwobosi
—	DF		Ridwan Saka
—	FW		Gianpiero Sansonetti
—	DF		Haji Shee
—	FW		Armaan Somani
—	FW		Jacob Yankey

== Crest ==
The crest used from 2006 till 2009

The club's first crest was created in 2003 and used until 2005. In 2006, with the introduction of the International Division the club joined the division, and modified the team's crest and jerseys to represent the Italian community within the York Region.

The new club badge mirrored those of the Italy national team. It consisted of shield badge with the Italian flag on it with the club's name written above it. After the reformatting of the National and International Divisions into the First Division the Shooters changed the team crest and name in order to represent the entire York Region territory. The new modern crest is shaped as a shield badge with a blue and gold background with the name of the club placed in the center with three stars above it.

== Seasons ==
=== First team ===
Season	League	Teams	Record	Rank	Playoffs	Ref
2003	Canadian Professional Soccer League (Eastern Conference)	13	7–7–4	3rd	Finals	
2004	Canadian Professional Soccer League (Eastern Conference)	11	11–5–4	3rd	Finals	
2005	Canadian Professional Soccer League (Eastern Conference)	12	16–3–3	1st	Finals	
2006	Canadian Soccer League (International Division)	12	8–9–5	3rd	Champions	
2007	Canadian Soccer League (International Division)	10	11–7–4	3rd	Quarterfinals	
2008	Canadian Soccer League (International Division)	11	13–3–6	1st	Semifinals	
2009	Canadian Soccer League (International Division)	10	7–4–7	3rd	Semifinals	
2010	Canadian Soccer League (First Division)	13	13–7–4	1st	Quarterfinals	
2011	Canadian Soccer League (First Division)	14	12–6–8	8th	Semifinals	
2012	Canadian Soccer League (First Division)	16	9–11–2	5th	Semifinals	
2013	Canadian Soccer League (First Division)	12	15–2–5	5th	Quarterfinals	
2014	Canadian Soccer League (First Division)	10	13–5–0	1st	Champions	
2015	Canadian Soccer League (First Division)	12	13–1–8	3rd	Semifinals	
2016	Canadian Soccer League (First Division)	8	16–3–2	1st	Semifinals	
2017	Canadian Soccer League (First Division)	8	9–3–2	3rd	Champions	
2022	Canadian Soccer League	6	5–3–2	2nd	Semifinals	

=== Second team ===
Season	League	Teams	Record	Rank	Playoffs	Ref
2008	Canadian Soccer League (Reserve Division)	5	12–1–3	1st	Champions	
2010	Canadian Soccer League (Reserve Division)	11	8–3–4	4th	Finals	
2011	Canadian Soccer League (Second Division)	14	9–4–6	3rd	Quarterfinals	
2012	Canadian Soccer League (Second Division)	12	7–3–6	7th	Semifinals	
2013	Canadian Soccer League (Second Division)	9	5–5–6	7th	Semifinals	
2014	Canadian Soccer League (Second Division)	9	7–5–4	3rd	Quarterfinals	
2015	Canadian Soccer League (Second Division)	10	11–1–6	2nd	Quarterfinals	
2016	Canadian Soccer League (Second Division)	6	5–3–7	4th	Champions	

== Head coaches ==
- Dave Benning (2003–2004)
- Sam Mederios (2004)
- Carmine Isacco (2005–2006)
- Tony De Thomasis (2006–2007)
- Carmine Isacco (2008)
- Roberto Pugliese (2009)

- Filipe Bento (2010–2011)
- Brian Bowes (2011)
- John Pacione (2012–2013)
- Darryl Gomez (2014)
- Tony De Thomasis (2015–2017)
- Sam Mederios (2022)

== Venues ==
Year(s)	Venue	Location
2003–2004	Dufferin District Field	1441 Clark Avenue in Vaughan
2004–2006	Ontario Soccer Centre,	7601 Martin Grove Road, Vaughan
2007–2017	St. Joan Of Arc Turf Field	1 Saint Joan of Arc Avenue, Vaughan

== Honours ==
York Region Shooters

- CSL Championship: 2006, 2014, 2017
- Canadian Soccer League First Division: 2010, 2014, 2016
- Canadian Soccer League International Division: 2008
- Canadian Professional Soccer League Eastern Conference: 2005
- CPSL Championship runner-up: 2003, 2004, 2005

York Region Shooters II

- CSL II Championship: 2016
- Canadian Soccer League Reserve Division: 2008

== Notable players ==
Canada

- Anthony Adur (2006, 2016)
- Stuart Black (2005)
- Joseph Di Chiara (2010)
- David Diplacido (2008)
- Dino Gardner (2011, 2014–17)
- Willy Giummarra (2003)
- Frank Jonke (2008)
- Nicholas Lindsay (2016)
- Taylor Lord (2011)
- Cameron Medwin (2003–05)
- Evan Milward (2006)
- Matthew O'Connor (2007, 2010)
- Matthew Palleschi (2003–05, 2008)
- Vince Petrasso (2010)
- Jon Paul Piques (2008)
- Carlos Rivas Godoy (2011–12)
- Bayete Smith (2003)
- Marco Terminesi (2008)
- Elvis Thomas (2003)
- Julian Uccello (2012)
- Gil Vainshtein
- Murphy Wiredu (2008)

Bermuda

- Taurean Manders (2012)

Dominican Republic

- Wilson Martínez (2013–14)

Guyana

- Adrian Butters (2011, 2016)
- Konata Mannings (2007)
- Jamaal Smith (2008)
- Jelani Smith (2008)

Jamaica

- Ashton Bennett (2015-)
- Kavin Bryan (2017)
- Richard Edwards (2013–17)
- Camaal Reid (2016–17)
- Richard West (2013–17)
- Odain Simpson (2015–17)

Macedonia

- Aleksandar Stojanovski (2015–17)

Saint Kitts and Nevis

- Darryl Gomez (2005, 2009–10, 2012–13)

Trinidad and Tobago

- Hayden Fitzwilliams (2016)
- Rick Titus (2008–10)
- Jonathan Westmaas (2003, 2010)

United States of America

- David Schipper (2015–17)
