= 2004 Canadian Professional Soccer League season =

Canadian Professional Soccer League
- Season: 2004
- Champions: Toronto Croatia
- Regular Season title: Toronto Supra (Eastern Conference); Hamilton Thunder (Western Conference)
- Matches: 110
- Goals: 415 (3.77 per match)
- Top goalscorer: Paul Munster (London City)
- Best goalkeeper: George Azcurra
- Biggest home win: HT 7-0 DS; TS 7-1 SCW
- Biggest away win: DS 0-8 TC

The 2004 Canadian Professional Soccer League season was the seventh season for the Canadian Professional Soccer League. The season began on May 24, 2004 and concluded on October 11, 2004 with Toronto Croatia defeating Vaughan Shooters 4–0 to capture their second CPSL Championship (known as the Rogers CPSL Cup for sponsorship reasons). The championship was hosted for the first time at Victoria Park Stadium in Brampton, Ontario, which granted the Brampton Hitmen a wildcard berth. In the regular season the Toronto Supra clinched their first Eastern Conference title, while Hamilton Thunder secured their second Western Conference title. Though the league decreased in membership they managed to expand to the Windsor - Detroit territory with the addition of the Windsor Border Stars.

== Changes from 2003 season ==
The 2004 season saw the league decrease from 13 to 11 teams. The Ottawa Wizards, and the Durham Flames had their franchises revoked. The Laval Dynamites went on hiatus as they awaited the completion of their home venue the Centre Sportif Bois-de-Boulogne. Though the CPSL lost 3 franchises they managed to expand to the Essex County with the addition of the Windsor Border Stars. Founding member the Mississauga Olympians were sold to John O'Neill and replaced the Durham Flames under the name Durham Storm. Vaughan Sun Devils changed their name to the Vaughan Shooters, while the North York Astros joined them in their move to the Ontario Soccer Centre. Director of Officials Tony Camacho resigned and was replaced by former Director at Large Walter Kirchner.

== Teams ==
Team	City	Stadium	Manager
Brampton Hitmen	Brampton, Ontario (Bramalea)	Victoria Park Stadium	Steve Nijjar
Durham Storm	Oshawa, Ontario (Vanier)	Oshawa Civic Stadium	Derek Bean
London City	London, Ontario (Westmount)	Cove Road Stadium	Harry Gauss
Hamilton Thunder	Hamilton, Ontario	Brian Timmis Stadium	Jorge Armua
Metro Lions	Toronto, Ontario (Scarborough)	Birchmount Stadium	Goran Miscevic
North York Astros	Toronto, Ontario (North York)	Ontario Soccer Centre	Vittorio Villacis
St. Catharines Wolves	St. Catharines, Ontario (Vansickle)	Club Roma Stadium	Lucio Ianiero
Toronto Croatia	Mississauga, Ontario (Streetsville)	Memorial Park	Aldo Krajcar
Toronto Supra	Toronto, Ontario (Brockton)	Centennial Park Stadium	José Testas
Vaughan Shooters	Vaughan, Ontario (Woodbridge)	Ontario Soccer Centre	Sam Mederios
Windsor Border Stars	Windsor, Ontario	Windsor Stadium	Pat Hilton

=== Coaching changes ===
Team	Outgoing coach	Manner of departure	Date of vacancy	Position in table	Incoming coach	Date of appointment
Hamilton Thunder	John Di Pasquale	replaced	August 4, 2004		Jorge Armua	August 4, 2004

Location of CPSL teams outside of Toronto for the 2004 CPSL season.
Western Conference Eastern Conference
Location of CPSL teams in Toronto for the 2004 CPSL season.
Western Conference Eastern Conference

== Final standings ==
=== Eastern Conference ===
Pos	Team	Pld	W	D	L	GF	GA	GD	Pts	Qualification
1	Toronto Supra	20	14	4	2	49	21	+28	46	Qualification for Playoffs
2	Metro Lions	20	12	5	3	50	32	+18	41	Qualification for Playoffs
3	Vaughan Shooters	20	11	5	4	41	23	+18	38	Qualification for Playoffs
4	North York Astros	20	3	4	13	33	41	−8	13	
5	Durham Storm	20	2	1	17	17	77	−60	7	

Updated to match(es) played on September 30, 2004. Source: http://www.rocketrobinsoccerintoronto.com/reports04/04cpwk20.htm
Rules for classification: 1) points; 2) goal difference; 3) number of goals scored.

=== Western Conference ===
Pos	Team	Pld	W	D	L	GF	GA	GD	Pts	Qualification
1	Hamilton Thunder	20	10	6	4	51	22	+29	36	Qualification for Playoffs
2	Toronto Croatia	20	9	4	7	42	30	+12	31	Qualification for Playoffs
3	Windsor Border Stars	20	9	4	7	38	32	+6	31	Qualification for Playoffs
4	Brampton Hitmen	20	7	5	8	32	35	−3	26	Qualification for Playoffs
5	London City	20	7	3	10	35	42	−7	24	
6	St. Catharines Wolves	20	3	5	12	27	44	−17	14	

Updated to match(es) played on September 30, 2004. Source: http://www.rocketrobinsoccerintoronto.com/reports04/04cpwk20.htm
Rules for classification: 1) points; 2) goal difference; 3) number of goals scored.

== Rogers CPSL Championship playoffs ==
=== Quarterfinals ===
October 3, 2004	Toronto Croatia	5–0	Windsor Border Stars	Mississauga, Ontario
7:00 ET	Halburto Harris 8'; Jason Shannon 29'; Edin Kalic 46', 57'; Rudy Spajic 89'	(Report)		Stadium: Memorial Park; Attendance: 250; Referee: Gord Arrowsmith (Ontario

October 5, 2004	Metro Lions	3–5	Vaughan Shooters	Toronto, Ontario
7:30 ET	Craig Patton 32'; Maxim Dorneval 38'; Darryl Gomez 70'	(Report)	Matthew Palleschi 6'; Fitzroy Powell 53'; Matthew Palleschi 57'; Joey Todaro 66'; Fitzroy Powell 87'	Stadium: Birchmount Stadium; Attendance: 70; Referee: Angelo Gertsakis (Ontario

=== Wildcard ===
October 8, 2004	Brampton Hitmen	1–3	Toronto Croatia	Brampton, Ontario
7:30 ET	Jonathan Bustamante 37'	(Report)	Zvjezdan Kresic 50'; Halburto Harris 68'; Leo Laurito 93'	Stadium: Victoria Park Stadium; Attendance: 225; Referee: Steven DePiero (Ontario

=== Semifinals ===
October 9, 2004	Toronto Supra	1–4	Vaughan Shooters	Brampton, Ontario
10:00 ET	David Sousa 69'	(Report)	Matthew Palleschi 10'; Branko Majstorovic 52'; Fitzroy Powell 75'; Matthew Palleschi 85'	Stadium: Victoria Park Stadium; Attendance: 100; Referee: Calin Pintea (Ontario

October 9, 2004	Hamilton Thunder	0–2	Toronto Croatia	Brampton, Ontario
1:00 ET		(Report)	Leo Laurito 29'; Leo Marasovic 88'	Stadium: Victoria Park Stadium; Attendance: 100; Referee: Alex Williams (Ontario

=== Rogers CPSL Championship ===
October 11
3:00 ET

Vaughan Shooters	0–4	Toronto Croatia
	Report	Leo Marasovic 49'; Leo Marasovic 60'; Marko Milicevic 90'; Zupan 94'

Victoria Park Stadium, Brampton, Ontario
Attendance: 300
Referee: Amato De Luca (Ontario)

GK	1	(Canada) Brian Bowes
RB	17	Raj Takhar	(substituted off) 87'
CB	2	(Canada) Angelo Pollastrone (c)
LB	4	Jorge Molina
RM	7	(Canada) Cameron Medwin	(substituted off) 61'
CM	11	(Canada) Branko Majstorovic	(substituted off) 62'
CM	10	(Canada) Joey Todaro
CM	8	Chris Turner
LM	21	(Canada) Marco Casilinuovo	(substituted off) 45'
ST	13	(Canada) Matthew Palleschi
ST	9	(Canada) Jason De Thomasis	Red card
Substitutes:
GK	0	Roberto Scala
DF	12	Fitzroy Powell	(substituted on) 61'
DF	15	(Canada) Fitzroy Christey	(substituted on) 45'
DF	6	Tony Marshall	(substituted on) 62' (substituted off) 75'
MF	23	Ricardo Forno	(substituted on) 87'
FW	19	Jose Anikewe	(substituted on) 75'
FW	20	Steve Said
Manager:
(Italy) Tony De Thomasis

GK	1	(Canada) George Azcurra	Red card
RB	6	Mario Kulis
CB	5	(Croatia) Antonijo Zupan
LB	3	(Jamaica) Halburto Harris
RM	22	Danny Draganic
CM	9	Zvjezdan Kresic	(substituted off) 87'
CM	8	(Argentina) Hugo Alstitud	(substituted off) 59'
CM	11	(Croatia) Velimir Crljen
LM	21	Marko Milicevic
FW	16	Edin Kalic	(substituted off) 80'
FW	10	Leo Laurito	(substituted off) 45'
Substitutes:
GK	12	Vinko Kozina	(substituted on) 87'
DF	2	(Croatia) Ante Pavlovic
DF	4	Rudy Spajic
MF	7	Andrew Saulez	(substituted on) 59'
FW	20	Leo Marasovic	(substituted on) 45'
FW	23	John Sola	(substituted on) 80'
Manager:
(Croatia) Theo Krajacic

Assistant referees:
Silviu Petrescu
Yakov Keimakh
Fourth official:
Alex William

== All-Star game ==
In the 2004 All-Star game Boavista F.C. of the Primeira Liga conducted a North American tour where one of their opponents were a CPSL Select team assembled by Harry Gauss, and Steve Nijjar. The match was played at Cove Road Stadium in London, Ontario.

May 28, 2004	CPSL Selects	0 - 3	Boavista F.C.	London, Ontario
8:10 pm		Report	Ricardo Sousa 33'; João Paulo Pinto Ribeiro 47'; Hugo Monteiro 59'	Stadium: Cove Road Stadium

CPSL Selects
Pos.	Name	Team
Squad
GK	George Azcurra	Toronto Croatia
D	Peter Zorba	North York Astros
D	Mason Greene	Durham Storm
D	Bayete Smith	Brampton Hitmen
D	Marko Peeters	London City
MF	Sasha Kosanovic	Metro Lions
MF	Kosta Stojkovic	Metro Lions
MF	Justin Medeiros	London City
MF	Caswain Mason	Metro Lions
F	Darryl Gomez	Metro Lions
F	Paul Munster	London City
Squad
GK	Haidar Al-Shaïbani	London City
MF	Gentjan Dervishi	London City
MF	Kareem Reynolds	Metro Lions
MF	Phil Ionadi	Brampton Hitmen
MF	Billy Ninopoulos	Metro Lions
F	Marko Janjicek	Metro Lions
Head coach
	Harry Gauss; Steve Nijjar	London City; Brampton Hitmen

== Top goal scorers ==
Rank	Player	Club	Goals
1	(Northern Ireland) Paul Munster	London City	25
2	(Canada) Danny Amaral	Toronto Supra	15
3	(Canada) Alex Braletic	North York Astros	10
3	(Canada) Michael Diluca	Hamilton Thunder	10
3	(Argentina) Tati Errecalde	Windsor Border Stars	10
4	(Haiti) Maxim Elie Dorneval	Metro Lions	9
4	(Trinidad and Tobago) Hayden Fitzwilliams	Metro Lions	9
4	(Trinidad and Tobago) Kevin Nelson	Hamilton Thunder	9
4	(Canada) Matthew Palleschi	Vaughan Shooters	9
5	(United States) Aaron Byrd	Windsor Border Stars	8
5	(Canada) Paul Daccobert	Brampton Hitmen	8
5	Daniel Jaroch	North York Astros	8
5	Leo Laurito	Toronto Croatia	8
5	(Croatia) Sasa Milaimovic	Hamilton Thunder	8
5	Craig Patton	Metro Lions	8
5	Joey Todaro	Vaughan Shooters	8

Updated: September 11, 2017
Source: http://www.rocketrobinsoccerintoronto.com/reports04/04cpsl2x.htm

== CPSL Executive Committee ==
A list of the 2004 CPSL Executive Committee.

Position	Name	Nationality
President & Chairman:	Vincent Ursini	(Canada) Canadian
League Administrator/Director of Media:	Stan Adamson	(England) English
Director of Discipline:	Clifford Dell	(Canada) Canadian
Director of Officials:	Walter Kirchner	(Romania) Romanian
Administrative Co-ordinator:	Janet Leonard	(Canada) Canadian
Community Services:	Peter Li Preti	(Canada) Canadian
Legal Counsel:	Ira Greenspoon	(Canada) Canadian
Marketing Consultant:	Cary Kaplan	(Canada) Canadian
Marketing Manager:	Jess Krajacic	(Canada) Canadian

== Individual awards ==
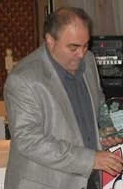
North York Astros owner Bruno Ierullo received the President of the Year award

The annual CPSL awards ceremony was held on October 9, 2004 at the La Contessa Banquet Hall in North York, Toronto. London City and Windsor Border Stars were both tied with the most wins with 2 awards. London City's Paul Munster had a tremendous season where he captured both the Golden Boot and Rookie of the Year, which later spring boarded his career back to Europe to sign with Slavia Prague in the Czech First League. After leading expansion franchise Windsor Border Stars to an Open Canada Cup, former English football player Pat Hilton was given the Coach of the Year. While Windsor's Justin Marshall was voted the Defender of the Year.

The league chose Danny Amaral as its MVP after making his return to Canadian soccer with Toronto Supra after several seasons in Portugal. George Azcurra of Toronto Croatia won his fourth Goalkeeper of the Year. The Referee of the Year went to Amato De Luca, which marked his second CPSL accolade. The most disciplined team throughout the season were Durham Storm. The league also introduced the President of the Year award in order to recognize the top executive or organizer, and the inaugural recipient was North York Astros Bruno Ierullo.

Award	Player (Club)
CPSL Most Valuable Player	Danny Amaral (Toronto Supra)
CPSL Golden Boot	Paul Munster (London City)
CPSL Goalkeeper of the Year Award	George Azcurra (Toronto Croatia)
CPSL Defender of the Year Award	Justin Marshall (Windsor Border Stars)
CPSL Rookie of the Year Award	Paul Munster (London City)
CPSL Coach of the Year Award	Pat Hilton (Windsor Border Stars)
CPSL President of the Year Award	Bruno Ierullo (North York Astros)
CPSL Referee of the Year Award	Amato De Luca
CPSL Fair Play Award	Durham Storm
