= Lucumí =

Lucumí or Lukumí may refer to:

- Lucumí language, a ritual lexicon used as the liturgical language of Santería
- Lucumí people, an Afro-Cuban ethnic group of Yoruba ancestry
- Lucumí religion, another name for Santería, an African diaspora religion

== People ==
- Brayan Lucumí (born 1994), Colombian footballer
- Carlota Lucumí (died 1844), Afro-Cuban slave and rebel leader
- Édison Hipólito Chará Lucumí (1980–2011), Colombian footballer
- Jan Lucumí (born 2004), Colombian footballer
- Janer Guaza Lucumí (born 1991), Colombian footballer
- Jeison Lucumí (born 1995), Colombian footballer
- Jhon Lucumí (born 1998), Colombian footballer
- Luis Lucumí (born 1958), Colombian javelin thrower
- Luis Fernando Lucumí Villegas (born 1998), Colombian athlete
- Luis Sinisterra Lucumí (born 1999), Colombian footballer
- Remigio Lucumí (1811/1816–1905), Afro-Cuban babalawo
- Sebastián Rincón Lucumí (born 1994), Colombian footballer
- Víctor Guazá Lucumí (born 1985), Colombian footballer

== See also ==
- Loukoumi, a family of confections based on a gel of starch and sugar
