= SC Toronto =

Canadian soccer team

- Full name: Soccer Club of Toronto
- Nicknames: Supra, the Eagles
- Founded: 1994 (pro team, as Portuguese United); 1997 (youth club, as Toronto Eagles SC)
- Stadium: Lamport Stadium; Toronto, Ontario
- Capacity: 9,600
- Chairman: Jose DaSilva
- Manager: Doug McNaught
- League: Canadian Soccer League
- 2011: Regular season: 1st Playoffs: Quarter-finals
- Website: http://www.sctoronto.ca/
Home colours	Away colours

SC Toronto is a Canadian soccer team, founded in 1994. The team was a member of the Canadian Soccer League, and played its final home games at Lamport Stadium in the city of Toronto, Ontario. The club found success early on since its inception as the Toronto Supra in the Canadian National Soccer League, making the postseason in 1996, and the championship finals in 1997. With the creation of the Canadian Professional Soccer League in 1998, Toronto missed out in registering for the league which resulted in the club completing in local amateur leagues. Supra would eventually return to the professional level in 2001, entering the CPSL as an expansion franchise.

Immediately, Supra became a playoff and title contender reaching the CPSL Championship finals in its debut season in the CPSL. Supra would claim their first piece of silverware in 2004 by clinching their division title. However, soon after, Supra faced a decline in their performance, and re-branded itself as Portugal FC and managed to continue fighting for playoff berths. In 2011, Portugal FC merged with the youth club, Toronto Eagles SC, and became SC Toronto. Massive changes occurred within the managerial and team structure, which brought about a positive effect on the team's performance, and re-established Toronto as powerhouse within the league.

Due to the merger Toronto finished first in the overall standings and achieved their second regular season championship, and continued dominating the league until its departure from the CSL in 2013.

== History ==
=== Early years (1994–1997) ===
After the folding of Toronto First Portuguese in 1990 a new club by the name of Portuguese United was formed in 1994 to represent the Portuguese community in Toronto, and competed in the Canadian International Soccer League. In 1996, the team joined the Canadian National Soccer League, and become known as the Toronto Supra. The club's home matches were played at Lamport Stadium. Toronto's first head coach was Cesar Garcia, who assembled a roster of young promising players. The squad included Paulo Silva, Adolfo Mella, Gus Kouzmanis, Adonay Alfaro Murcia, Sam Medeiros, Stuart Black, Frank Cardona, Danny Amaral, and Armando Manjate was appointed the team captain. The season started off well with Supra achieving an 8-game undefeated streak, and qualified for the postseason by finishing third in the overall standings. In the playoffs their opponents were St. Catharines Wolves, where Toronto was eliminated by a score of 2–1 on goals on aggregate. At the CNSL Awards ceremony Kouzmanis was awarded the Rookie of the Year, and Sergio Giancola received the Best Public Relations Director award.

For the 1997 season new additions were made to the roster after key players were signed by European clubs and by USL A-League expansion Toronto Lynx. The new additions were Piotr Libicz, Chris Handsor, Paul Moore, Phil Ionadi, and Czesław Zajac. Toronto reached the postseason for the second consecutive season and faced Toronto Croatia in the first round. Supra advanced to the finals by defeating Croatia by a score of 8–1 on goals on aggregate. Their opponents were once more St. Catharines, where the team came short of capturing their first title by losing 4–3 on goals on aggregate. In 1998, the Canadian National Soccer League and the stillborn Ontario Professional Soccer League merged to form the Canadian Professional Soccer League, but Toronto Supra failed to submit an application to join the new league after worries about booking dates with Lamport Stadium.

=== Return to the CPSL and league contender (2001–2004) ===
Toronto Supra returned to the professional level in 2001, by entering the CPSL along with Brampton Hitmen, Montreal Dynamites, and the Ottawa Wizards. Brockton Stadium served as the club's home stadium. Former USL and European league players were added to strengthen the roster, bringing in the likes of Garrett Caldwell, Peyvand Mossavat, Pedro Miguel Dias, Ryan Gamble, Leonardo Simon, and Christian Lombardo. Mossavat and Gamble were selected for the CPSL Selects squad which faced C.S. Marítimo. In their debut season in the CPSL, Supra reached the finals of the Open Canada Cup tournament, where they faced the Ottawa Wizards but lost by a score of 1–0. Their success continued by finishing third in the overall standings and posted one of the best defensive records in the league. In the postseason Supra faced league powerhouse Toronto Olympians, and defeated the Olympians by a score of 3–2. In the finals Toronto faced St, Catharines Wolves, but the club was defeated by a score of 1–0. Caldwell was awarded the CPSL Championship MVP award.

Significant changes occurred within the organization for the 2002 season, with Supra moving their home venue to Centennial Park Stadium, and Victor Cameira serving as the new head coach and general manager. Former CPSL Golden Boot champion Eddy Berdusco was signed along with Francisco Dos Santos, Darryl Gomez, and Waldo Sponton from the Toronto Lynx. After a slow start to the season, Carmine Isacco was appointed the new head coach while Cameira retained his position of general manager. Despite the changes Toronto wasn't able to bounce back and finished last in the Eastern Conference falling to secure a postseason berth.

In preparation for the 2003 season, Toronto Supra hired the services of Jose Testas who brought back Danny Amaral from Portugal and named him captain. He maintained the majority of the previous roster while signing a mixture of younger players like Michael Di Luca, Fabio Silva, and Jaroslaw Radzinski - the younger brother of Canadian international Tomasz Radzinski. Supra would go on having a successful season achieving a 16-game undefeated streak, and maintaining their record until the final two games of the season. Testas would lead Toronto to a second-place finish in the Eastern Conference and posting the second-best offensive record within the league. In the postseason Supra faced Vaughan Sun Devils with goals coming from Di Luca, and Amaral, but Supra fell short with a goal coming from Vaughan in overtime resulting in a 4–3 loss for Supra. For his achievements Testas was awarded the CPSL Coach of the Year.

Testas was brought back for the 2004 season and retained the majority of the preceding roster with former CPSL Defender of Year Domagoj Sain, Robert Fran, and Frank Cardona as new signings for the season. Supra repeated their success from the previous year opening their season with a ten-game undefeated streak. After suffering a defeat to Hamilton Thunder the club bounced back with a nine-game undefeated streak to claim their first piece of silverware by clinching the Eastern Conference title, and finish first in the overall league standings. Supra also posted the best defensive record within the league that season. In the playoffs Toronto faced the Vaughan Shooters, but were eliminated by a score of 4–1. At the conclusion of the season for his efforts team captain Danny Amaral was awarded the CPSL MVP Award.

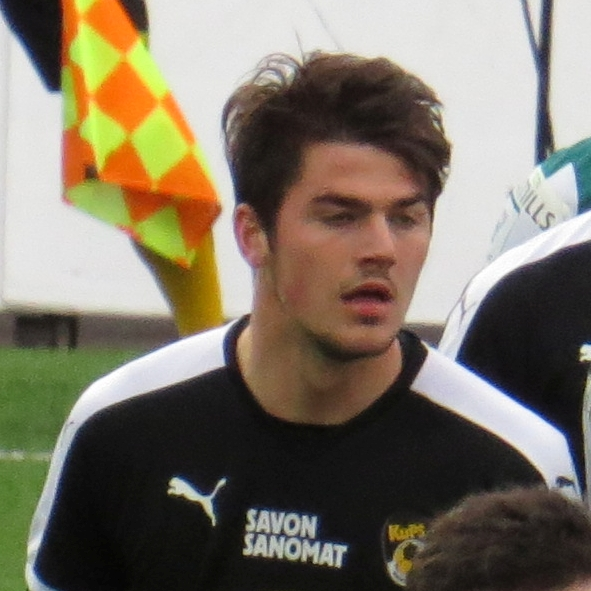
Canadian international Charlie Trafford began his professional career with SC Toronto in 2012

=== Stagnation and decline (2005–2009) ===
Toronto Supra brought back Dr. Cesar Garcia to coach the squad for the 2005 season. The season also marked the organizations return to Brockton Stadium as their new home venue. After only coaching five matches Garcia was replaced with Jose Testas. Under Testas direction the team's performance remained mediocre throughout the season finishing fourth in the Eastern Conference standings and thus failing to secure a postseason berth for the first since the 2002 season. One notable accomplishment went to long time goalkeeper Michael Silva as he was selected for the CPSL All-Star roster which faced Scottish giants Rangers F.C. in a friendly match.

In 2006, the league changed its name to Canadian Soccer League and reformed the East and West Conferences into the National and International Divisions. The changes were done in order to attract more native ethnic groups to support their local clubs. Toronto Supra joined the International Division, and as a result changed their name to the Toronto Supra Portuguese to acknowledge the club's ties to the local Portuguese community in Toronto. On April 24, 2006, club president Isaac Cambas announced the official name change and the signing of Colombian international Alexander Posada. Other significant signings were the return of Adolfo Mella, and Carlos Zeballos. Throughout the season Toronto repeated its previous mediocre season just barely qualifying for the postseason by finishing fourth in the International Division. Their opponents in the playoffs were division champions the Serbian White Eagles FC, where Serbia crushed Toronto by a score of 3–0. At the CSL Awards Banquet Toronto Supra received two awards - with Isaac Cambas receiving the President's Award and Uarlem Castro winning the Rookie of the Year award.

The following season new head coach Paulo Almas took charge of the club and acquired Jamaican international Winston Griffiths, and Brazilian import Helio Pereira to add additional reinforcements to the offense. Supra returned to Centennial Stadium after the league banned the use of Brockton Stadium. Two Supra players were selected for the 2007 CSL All Star Game with Helio Pereira and Gavin Fuller representing Toronto. As for the regular season Toronto continued its decline as a title and playoff contender with Almas being replaced midway through the season with Jorge Armua after a poor string of performances. Armua's attempt to revive Supra meet in vain as the club finished last in the International Division, and second last in the overall standings missing out on the postseason.

In 2008, the franchise re branded itself into Portugal FC and brought back Jose Testas to lead the team once more. Portugal FC brought numerous Brazilian imports signing Wigor Gomes, Emerson Fiti, Gustavo Serrano, IIailson Da Silva, and Jamaican Ramon Bailey to contracts. The club also returned to Lamport Stadium, its original home venue. Toronto's performance vastly improved throughout the season finishing in the top five with the best offensive and defensive records. The team secured a postseason berth by finishing fourth in the International Division and finishing fifth in the overall standings. In the quarterfinals Portugal faced Toronto Croatia and advanced to the next round with a 2–1 victory with goals coming from DiLuca, and team captain Amaral. In the semi-finals their opponents were National Division champions Trois-Rivières Attak, The club, however, lost 7-0 and were eliminated from the playoffs.

In preparations for the 2009 CSL season, Portugal appointed former team captain Danny Amaral as the new head coach for the organization. Notable signings included St. Lucian international Jarvin Skeete, and Taylor Lord. The team struggled throughout the season in order to maintain a playoff berth, but clinched the final postseason position spot by finishing fourth in the International Division. Their opponents in the quarterfinals were Trois-Rivieres Attak, where the Attak would win the series by 6–0 on goals on aggregate.

=== Merger and departure (2010–2012) ===
Major changes occurred within the team's structure as former head coach Carmine Isacco returned to his old position, and brought numerous new recruits. The notable players he brought in were CSL Rookie of the Year Adrian Pena, Richard Asante, Jamaal Smith, Andrea Lombardo, Marko Bedenikovic, John Jonke, Massimo Mirabelli, Dominic Oppong, and Sergio De Luca was named club captain. The changes replaced the majority of veterans with younger athletes with European and Major League Soccer experience. The changes helped Portugal finish fifth in the overall standings with the second-best offensive record. Their opponents were Milltown FC where Toronto won the first match with a goal from Carlos Nogueira in a 1–0 victory. The second match resulted in a 2–2 draw, but Portugal advanced to the semi-finals by 3-2 goals on aggregate. Toronto faced Brantford Galaxy in the semi-finals, but were defeated by a score of 5–3.

In 2011, Portugal FC merged with its local youth feeder team the Toronto Eagles and became SC Toronto. The merger proved a success as Toronto achieve a twelve-game undefeated streak throughout the season. The season also brought the organization's second regular season championship since the 2004 season, and finished with the league's best offensive record, and third best defensive record. In the quarterfinals of the postseason they faced York Region Shooters, where in the first round Toronto lost to a score of 1–0. In the second round played at home Toronto would win 4–3. The quarterfinal series was tied 4-4 and the match went into a penalty shootout, where York Region would end up victorious in a 4–2 win on penalties. At the CSL Awards ceremony Scott Cliff was awarded the CSL Goalkeeper of the Year.

For the 2012 season Isacco was promoted to the position of technical director with assistant coach Patrice Gheisar serving as head coach. Gheisar named former Canadian international Marco Reda as his assistant coach. Notable acquisitions were young prospects Janer Guaza, Jarek Whiteman, Jay Chapman, Charlie Trafford, Anthony Di Biase, and Jonathan Osorio. In his debut season Gheisar managed a ten-game undefeated streak and led to his team to a third-place finish with a respectable offensive and defensive record. Their opponents in the quarterfinals of the playoffs were the Serbian White Eagles where they were eliminated by an overtime goal. At the conclusion of the season SC Toronto midfielder Osorio was honored with the CSL Rookie of the Year.

Following the CSA de-sanctioning of the league, SC Toronto announced its withdrawal from the CSL with the intention of returning for the 2014 season, although they never returned.

The youth club, however, has continued to operate despite the withdrawal from the CSL.

=== Toronto Eagles Youth Soccer Club ===
The Toronto Eagles Soccer Club was founded in 1997, by parents from the soccer program being run by the Wallace Emerson Community Centre. The club continued to operate out of Wallace Emerson, before eventually moving to a clubhouse in Christie Pits. In 2012, they merged with Portugal FC to become SC Toronto. Despite the pro team ceasing operations, the youth club remains in operation.

== Colours and badge ==
Toronto Supra
(2001–07)

Portugal FC
(2008–10)

With the name change from Toronto Portuguese Supra to Portugal FC, there was a change in the badge in 2008. The club would re-brand again in 2011, becoming SC Toronto, introducing a new crest but keeping the team colours of white and black.

== Achievements ==
- Canadian Professional Soccer League Eastern Conference Champions/Regular Season Champions (2): 2004, 2011

== Year-by-year ==
Year	Division	League	Regular season	Playoffs
2001	1	CPSL	Third	Final
2002	1 - Eastern Conference	CPSL	Seventh	Did not qualify
2003	1 - Eastern Conference	CPSL	Second	Semi-finals
2004	1 - Eastern Conference	CPSL	First	Semi-finals
2005	1 - Eastern Conference	CPSL	Fourth	Did not qualify
2006	1 - International Division	CSL	Fourth	Quarter-finals
2007	1 - International Division	CSL	Fifth	Did not qualify
2008	1 - International Division	CSL	Fourth	Semi-finals
2009	1 - International Division	CSL	Fourth	Quarter-finals
2010	1	CSL	Fifth	Semi-finals
2011	1	CSL	First	Quarter-finals
2012	1	CSL	Third	Quarter-finals

== Managers ==
Years	Name	Nation
1996-2001	Cesar Garcia	Canada
2002	Victor Cameira	Portugal
2002	Carmine Isacco	Canada
2003-2004	Jose Testas	Portugal
2005	Cesar Garcia	Canada
2005-2006	Jose Testas	Portugal
2007	Paulo Almas	Portugal
2007	Jorge Armua	Uruguay
2008	Jose Testas	Portugal
2009	Danny Amaral	Canada
2010-2011	Carmine Isacco	Canada
2012	Patrice Gheisar	Canada

== Stadiums ==
The Portuguese community club played in Lamport Stadium. From 2001 to 2007, the club had played at Centennial Park Stadium.

- Centennial Park Stadium, Etobicoke, Toronto, Ontario (2001–07)
- Lamport Stadium, Toronto, Ontario (2008–2012)

== Players ==
Canada

- Bryce Alderson (2010)
- Danny Amaral (1996, 2003-05, 2008-09)
- Marko Bedenikovic (2010-11)
- Eddy Berdusco (2002)
- Stuart Black (1996-97)
- Frank Cardona (1996-97, 2004-05)
- Jay Chapman (2012)
- Sergio De Luca (2010-12)
- Anthony Di Biase (2012)
- Luca Gasparotto (2011)
- Chris Handsor (1997)
- Phil Ionadi (1997)
- Carmine Isacco (2002)
- Brandon John (2012)
- John Jonke (2010)
- Andrea Lombardo (2010-2012)
- Christian Lombardo (2001-2004)
- Taylor Lord (2009)
- Adolfo Mella (1996-97, 2006)
- Massimo Mirabelli (2010-11)
- Paul Moore (1997)
- Peyvand Mossavat (2001-02, 2006)
- Dominic Oppong (2010)
- Jonathan Osorio (2012)
- Quillan Roberts (2010)
- Matt Silva (2011)
- Charlie Trafford (2012)

Albania

- Blerim Rrustemi (2000-01)

Angola

- Luis Cazengue (2002)

Brazil

- Francisco Dos Santos (2002, 2005, 2007)
- Armandinho Manjate (1996)
- Helio Pereira (2007-08)
- Fabio Senhorinho Silva (2003, 2004-06)
- Paulo Silva (1996)
- Marco Aurélio de Oliveira (2003, 2004, 2005)

Colombia

- Janer Guaza (2012)
- Alexander Posada (2006)

Guyana

- Jamaal Smith (2011)

Hong Kong

- Michael Luk (2010)

Saint Lucia

- Jarvin Skeete (2009)

Saint Kitts and Nevis

- Darryl Gomez (2002)

South Africa

- Ryan Gamble (2001-02)

USA

- Garrett Caldwell (2001)
