= Danny Amaral =

Canadian soccer player and coach

- Amaral in 2008

Personal information
- Full name: Daniel Araujo Amaral
- Date of birth: 4 January 1973 (age 53)
- Place of birth: Canada
- Positions: Forward; midfielder

Senior career*
Years	Team	Apps	(Gls)
1996	Toronto Supra	6	(2)
1996–2000	F.C. Famalicão	80	(34)
1998–1999	→Real Jaén (loan)	35	(10)
1999–2000	Moreirense F.C.	8	(2)
2000–2001	U.S.C. Paredes	137	(13)
2001–2002	F.C. Vizela	28	(9)
2003–2005	Toronto Supra	55	(41)
2008–2009	Portugal FC	30	(14)

Managerial career
- 2009: Portugal FC
- 2017–: Portugal AC
- * Club domestic league appearances and goals

Daniel Araujo Amaral (born January 4, 1973) is a Canadian former soccer player and current head coach for Portugal AC in the Arena Premier League.

As a player he played with various Portuguese clubs, and in the Canadian National Soccer League until retiring in the Canadian Professional Soccer League. After his retirement from competitive soccer he managed his former club Portugal FC in 2009 in the Canadian Soccer League

== Playing career ==
Amaral began his career in 1996 with Toronto Supra of the Canadian National Soccer League. Midway through the season he was signed by F.C. Famalicão of the Segunda Divisão de Honra. In 1998, he was loaned to Real Jaén of the Segunda División B, where he appeared in 35 matches and scored ten goals. He would play for Famalicão for three seasons, and would appear in a total of 80 matches and recorded 34 goals. In 1999, he signed with Moreirense F.C. of the Segunda Liga, where he appeared in eight matches and scored two goals. After the relegation of Moreirense he signed with U.S.C. Paredes of the Portuguese Second Division. In 2001, Amaral signed with F.C. Vizela, and appeared in 22 matches and scored nine goals.

In 2003, he returned to Canada to sign with his old club the Toronto Supra competing in the Canadian Professional Soccer League. He made his return on May 29, 2003 in a match against Hamilton Thunder, where he recorded his first goal of the season. During the season, he was appointed the team captain, and helped Toronto finish second in the Eastern Conference and secured a playoff berth. In the first round of the postseason he contributed by scoring a goal in a 3-2 defeat to Vaughan Sun Devils. In 2004, Amaral helped the Supra claim their first piece of silverware by clinching the Eastern Conference title, and finished as the league's second highest goalscorer with 15 goals. For his efforts he was awarded the Canadian Soccer League MVP Award.

After failing to secure a postseason berth in 2005, Amaral took a sabbatical for two seasons and returned for the 2008 season. In 2006, he played in the Ontario Soccer League with Brampton Boavista.

In 2008, he helped Portugal FC (new franchise name for Toronto Supra) qualify for the postseason, and contributed by scoring a goal in a 2-1 victory over Toronto Croatia. Unfortunately their playoff run came to an end with a 7-0 defeat to Trois-Rivières Attak.

== Managerial career ==
In 2009, he announced his retirement and was appointed the new head coach for Portugal FC. Throughout the season he would occasionally play the dual role of player/coach for the club. He managed to clinch the final postseason berth for Portugal FC, but were defeated in the quarterfinals by Trois-Rivieres Attak by a score of 4-0 on goals on aggregate.

In 2017, he began managing at the indoor level as a head coach for Portugal AC in the Arena Premier League.

== Honours ==
Toronto Supra

- Canadian Professional Soccer League Eastern Conference title: 2004

Individual

- Canadian Professional Soccer League Most Valuable Player: 2004
