= Edmilson de Carvalho =

Brazilian footballer (born 1979)

Personal information
- Full name: Edmilson de Carvalho Barbosa
- Date of birth: 5 May 1979 (age 47)
- Place of birth: São Paulo, Brazil
- Position: Striker

Senior career*
Years	Team	Apps	(Gls)
2001–2002	Foz do Iguaçu		
2002–2003	Berliner AK 07		
2004	Hamilton Thunder	10	(4)
2004	→ Toronto Lynx (loan)	8	(0)
2005	Águia Negra		
2006	Malacateco		
2007	SER Juventude		
2007–2008	Srem	11	(2)
- * Club domestic league appearances and goals

Edmilson de Carvalho Barbosa (born 5 May 1979) is a Brazilian former footballer.

== Playing career ==
De Carvalho began playing football at the youth level with São Paulo, and Corinthians, where he won the Copa São Paulo de Juniores.

=== Hamilton Thunder and Toronto Lynx ===
In 2004, De Carvalho went abroad to Canada to sign with the Hamilton Thunder for the 2004 CPSL season. He made his debut on 27 May 2004 in a match against the Metro Lions. In a short while he was able to establish himself into the first team, where he scored four goals in nine appearances. On 30 July he was loaned out along with Matthew O'Connor to a higher division to the Toronto Lynx of the USL First Division. He made his Lynx debut on 7 August against Virginia Beach Mariners. However De Carvalho struggled to establish himself within the Toronto squad due to only appearing in matches for 45 minutes even when listed as starters. Once the season came to a conclusion and the Lynx failed to reach the post season De Carvalho returned to the Thunder. He helped Hamilton to clinch their first Western Conference title, and led the Thunder to semi-finals where they were defeated by Toronto Croatia.
