= Marina Camargo =

Brazilian visual artist

- Born: 1980; Maceió, Brazil
- Known for: video art, photography, drawing

Marina Camargo (born 1980) is a Brazilian visual artist who works in various media including video, photograph, installation and drawing.
She lives and works in Porto Alegre (Brazil) and Berlin (Germany).

== Early life and education ==
Born in Maceió (Alagoas, northeast Brazil), Camargo moved to Porto Alegre at the age of nine. She began university there, before completing her arts education in Barcelona, New York, and Munich. She studied for a Bachelors and a master's degree in Visual Arts at Instituto de Artes / UFRGS (in Porto Alegre) and holds a Diploma from Academy of Fine Arts in Munich, where she studied with Peter Kogler.

== Work ==
Marina Camargo has both her graduation and master in visual arts and works with photography, drawing, video and other media. The core subject of her production is the representation of the world apart from its origin. She took part in solo and collective exhibitions in Brazil and other countries, and received awards and scholarships to study abroad.

In 2010, Camargo was awarded a one-year German Academic Exchange Service – DAAD scholarship to Munich.

She devoted attention to the landscape and cultural history of Germany, making works where the social memory and representation of the alpine

landscape are the main focus of research, such as Oblivion, based on a series of found postcards featuring the Alpine mountains, and Alpenprojekt. Other projects have concerned archival moving image, as the work Eva Braun's Mountains, a stop motion video based on historical footages taken by Eva Braun at Hitler's country house known as Eagle's Nest.

"Marina Camargo’s Alpenprojekt is a series of videos registering the action of cutting out silhouettes of the Alps – at once an attempt at capturing and a reaction to this landscape, which wavers between the sublime and the artificial. The work is the fruit of a study of familiarization with the region, as well as the project Tratado Limites [“Treaty of Limits"] – presented at the Mercosul Biennial and based on the pampas of Rio Grande do Sul – and Lost Alps, a study centered on a mountain of industrial waste (Beckton Alps, London), conducted while participating in an artist's residency at the prestigious Gasworks. According to Cesar Garcia (curator), founder and director of ‘The Mistake Room’ in Los Angeles, "Her interests highlight the impossibility of representing complete realities and locales and through her work she draws attention to the elements that are lost, silenced, and forgotten in the space between reality and representation."

In 2011, Camargo was commissioned by the 8th Mercosur Biennial to create an artwork related to the Pampas region. Treaty of Limits was a project where Camargo used a variety of media including sound, photograph, in situ intervention and drawing, concerning a thought related to the borders of this region.
Maps were a very central element of Marina Camargo's work until her participation to the Mercosul Biennial.

"Signs, letters, words, the visible world, and particularly the urban environment are recurrent themes of her work. Her creative approach involves visual enigmas with the horizon line through mutations brought about by photography, a fascination for map-making of the sky and earth, independent of political connotations. As she herself recalls, “If maps are drawings to represent places, they are like letter forms, which are also drawings in the place of spoken language, giving form to written language". Her journey to the extreme south of the country provided by the Mercosul Biennial has inspired Marina Camargo to produce a series of works for this year's event, bearing in mind the "cultural and geographical identity of a region", poetically adding that there is "a dilution of frontiers, which are neither visible or relevant", as stated the curator Aracy Amaral.

In 2013 Marina Camargo published Como se faz um deserto (The making of a desert), a research and art project granted and supported by Funarte. The title was inspired on Euclides da Cunha's 'Os Sertões'. The search for understanding what would define Brazil's hinterlands (sertões) defined much of this research, going through cartographic, historical, linguistic terms, as a documentation of the work process, shown through photographs and texts that were produced during and after the trip through the sertões region.

Marina Camargo was a nominee artist in PIPA Prize 2016 and 2017.
