= Armandinho =

Armandinho may refer to:

- Armandinho (Brazilian guitarist) (born 1953), Brazilian MPB guitarist and singer from Bahia
- Armandinho (singer) (born 1970), Brazilian reggae singer from Rio Grande do Sul
- Armandinho (fado guitarist) (1891–1946), Portuguese fado guitarist
- Armandinho (footballer) (1911–1972), Brazilian footballer
- Armandinho Manjate (born 1965), former footballer and coach
