= Stuart Black =

Stuart Black may refer to:

- Stuart Black (sprinter) (1908–1989), New Zealand sprinter
- Stuart Black (soccer) (born 1975), Nigerian association footballer

== See also ==
- Ian Stuart Black (1915–1997), British novelist, playwright and screenwriter
