= Manjate =

Manjate is a surname. Notable people with the surname include:

- Apson Manjate (born 1985), Mozambican footballer
- Armandinho Manjate (born 1970), Brazilian footballer and manager
- Rogério Manjate (born 1972), Mozambican actor, director, and filmmaker
