= Marko Maschke =

German football manager (born 1967)

Personal information
- Full name: Marko Maschke
- Date of birth: 9 June 1967 (age 59)
- Place of birth: Germany

Managerial career
- Years: Team
- 1992–1997: BSC Rehberge Berlin
- 1997–2000: Chengdu Tiancheng F.C.
- 2000–2001: Berliner AK 07
- 2002: Hamilton Thunder
- 2003–2004: Füchse Berlin Reinickendorf (U19 coach)
- 2004: 1. FC Schweinfurt 05 (U19 coach)
- 2005–2007: Tennis Borussia Berlin (assistant coach)
- 2008: Integrál-DAC

Marko Maschke (born June 9, 1967) is a German football manager who managed clubs professionally in Europe and in North America.

== Managerial career ==
Maschke began coaching at the lower leagues in Germany with BSC Rehberge Berlin in 1992. After several years with Berlin he went abroad to China to sign with Chengdu Tiancheng F.C. With Tiancheng he won promotion for the club in 1997. In 2002, he went to Canada to sign with newly expansion Hamilton Thunder of the Canadian Professional Soccer League. He resigned midway through the season due to disputes with Hamilton's team owner Italo Ferrari over unpaid salaries. He returned to Europe to coach Füchse Berlin Reinickendorf and 1. FC Schweinfurt 05 at the U-19 levels. From 2005-2007 he served as assistant coach with Tennis Borussia Berlin, until returning to first team duties with Integrál-DAC in Hungary.
