= Jamaal Smith =

Canadian-Guyanese footballer (born 1988)

Personal information
- Date of birth: 22 February 1988 (age 38)
- Place of birth: Mississauga, Canada
- Height: 1.90 m (6 ft 3 in)
- Position: Defender

Team information
- Current team: Alpha United

Youth career
- York Lions

Senior career*
Years	Team	Apps	(Gls)
2008	Italia Shooters		
2011	SC Toronto		
2012	Syrianska Kerburan	20	(0)
2013	K-W United FC	0	(0)
2013–2014	Caledonia AIA		(0)
2014	Okzhetpes	1	(0)
2014	Vaughan Azzurri		
2015–2018	Alpha United		

International career
2012–2015	Guyana	12	(0)
- * Club domestic league appearances and goals

Jamaal Smith (born 22 February 1988) is a Canadian-born Guyanese former footballer who played as a defender.

== Career ==
=== College career ===
Smith played college soccer for the York Lions, winning CIS championships in 2008 and 2010. He also represented Canada at the Universiade in 2009 and 2011.

=== Club career ===
In 2007, he won a tryout for Major League Soccer expansion side Toronto FC, beating out over 900 participants, earning an invite to pre-season, but ultimately failed to make the squad.

Smith has played club football for Italia Shooters, SC Toronto, Syrianska Kerburan, K-W United FC, Caledonia AIA, Okzhetpes and Vaughan Azzurri.

He signed for Caledonia AIA in August 2013. His debut for Caledonia came in a 3–1 away defeat to Mexican club Toluca in the CONCACAF Champions League a few days later.

In April 2015, he was playing for Alpha United.

=== International career ===
Born in Canada, he made his international debut for Guyana in 2012, and has appeared in FIFA World Cup qualifying matches for them. He also represented them at the 2012 Caribbean Cup.

== International career statistics ==
As of match played 14 June 2015

Guyana
Year	Apps	Goals
2012	7	0
2013	0	0
2014	0	0
2015	5	0
Total	12	0

== Personal life ==
He is the older brother of Jelani Smith, who was also a soccer player for Guyana.
