= Doug McNaught =

Jamaican-born Canadian soccer player and coach

Personal information
- Full name: Douglas Antonio McNaught
- Date of birth: 6 July 1967 (age 59)
- Place of birth: Jamaica
- Height: 1.65 m (5 ft 5 in)
- Position: Midfielder

Senior career*
Years	Team	Apps	(Gls)
1986	Toronto First Portuguese		
1986–1988	Felgueiras	20	(4)
1988–1990	Vizela	56	(7)
1990–1991	G.D. Joane	15	(2)
1991–1995	Esposende	76	(7)
1996–1997	Desportivo de Arco de Baúlhe		

International career
1984–1985	Canada U20	10	(0)
1985	Canada	2	(0)
- * Club domestic league appearances and goals

Douglas McNaught (born 6 July 1967) is a Jamaican-born Canadian former professional soccer player who played as a midfielder.

== Club career ==
McNaught played in the National Soccer League in 1986 with Toronto First Portuguese. The remainder of the season he played abroad in the Portuguese Second Division with F.C. Felgueiras. In 1988, he played with F.C. Vizela, and later with G.D. Joane He also had stints with A.D. Esposende and with Desportivo de Arco de Baúlhe.

== International career ==
McNaught made his international debut on 20 August 1984 against Guatemala for the Canada U-20 team. During the 1984 CONCACAF U-20 Tournament, where he won the silver medal for Canada in the tournament. He represented Canada in the 1985 FIFA World Youth Championship, and featured in total of 10 matches for the Canada U-20 team. On 10 March 1985, he made his debut for senior national team against Trinidad and Tobago. In total he appeared in two matches for the senior team.

== Managerial career ==
In 2011, McNaught became involved with SC Toronto as a member of the technical team.
