= York Region Shooters (1998) =

Canadian soccer team

- Full name: York Region Shooters SC
- Nickname: The Shooters
- Founded: 1994 (as York Region Stallions)
- Dissolved: 2003 (merged with Vaughan Sun Devils)
- Stadium: Highland Park, Aurora, Ontario, Canada
- Capacity: 550+
- Owner: Frank Bisceglia (original); Tony De Thomasis (second owner)
- League: Canadian Professional Soccer League
Home colours	Away colours

The York Region Shooters were a soccer team playing in the Canadian Professional Soccer League from 1998 to 2002. They played their home matches in the town of Aurora, Ontario, north of Toronto.

The franchise was one of the original teams of the CPSL. The team had its origins in the York Region Soccer League and were previously known as the York Region Stallions. During its five-year stint in the CPSL the club failed to secure a postseason berth, but managed to develop some top talent for the Canada national team. In 2002, the York Region Shooters were sold by the Bisceglia family to Tony De Thomasis, and merged the club with the Vaughan Sun Devils in 2003.

== History ==
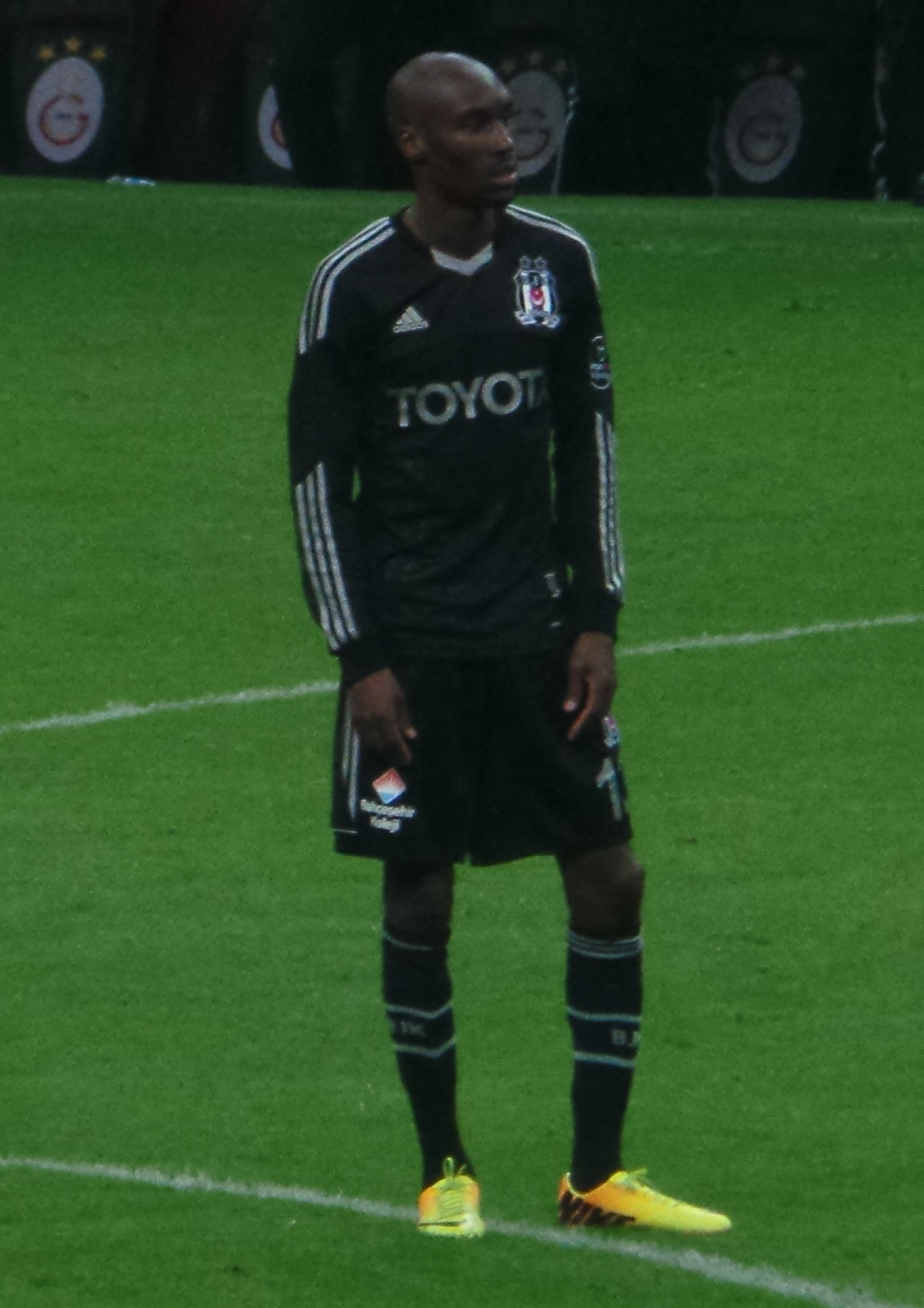
Six-time Canadian Player of the Year Atiba Hutchinson began his career with the York Region Shooters.

In 1994, Frank Bisceglia formed York Region Stallions and competed in the Metropolitan Toronto Soccer League. Later were transferred to the Newmarket Premier League under the name Aurora Shooters. In 1998, renamed the York Region Shooters they were promoted to the professional level by becoming a charter member of the Canadian Professional Soccer League, and received territorial rights to Aurora, Ontario in the York Region. Sam Foti was given the head coach responsibilities, and made their professional debut on May 31, 1998, against Mississauga Eagles P.S.C. in a 3–1 victory with the goals coming from Mike Glasgow, and Diego Saenz. Their debut season saw the club finish fifth in the standings, but missed the final postseason berth by 2 points.

The following season the Shooters moved south to Richmond Hill, Ontario. Their performance throughout the season saw a decline as they finished seventh in the standings. In 2000, the organization brought in Bijan Azizi to manage the team. York Region matched their 1998 season by finishing fifth in the standings just 4 points shy of a playoff berth. At the conclusion of the season Willy Giummarra received the CPSL MVP award. Adam Pagliaroli was appointed the head coach for the 2001 season, but failed as his predecessors in securing a postseason berth by finishing eleventh in the standings.

In 2002, a change occurred in the ownership with Tony De Thomasis purchasing the club from Bisceglia. De Thomasis returned Highland Park in Aurora, and hired Vito Colangelo for the head coach position. In preparation for the 2002 season Colangelo brought in the likes of Atiba Hutchinson, Adrian Cann, Andres Arango, Stuart Black, Piotr Libicz, and Cameron Medwin. During the season the CPSL divided the league into two Conferences with York Region being placed in the Eastern Conference. The 2002 season saw an improvement in the club's performance, but for the fifth straight year the Shooters failed to secure a postseason berth by finishing fourth in their conference. In 2003, the club merged with their rivals the Vaughan Sun Devils and united the York Region territory under principal owner De Thomasis.

== Head coaches ==
Years	Name	Nation
1998–1999	Sam Foti	Canada
2000	Bijan Azizi	Iran
2001	Adam Pagliaroli	Canada
2002	Vito Colangelo	Canada

== Year-by-year ==
Year	Division	League	Regular season	Playoffs
1998	1	CPSL	5th	Did not qualify
1999	1	CPSL	7th	Did not qualify
2000	1	CPSL	5th	Did not qualify
2001	1	CPSL	11th	Did not qualify
2002	1	CPSL	4th, Eastern Conference	Did not qualify

== Notable players ==
Canada
- Andres Arango (2002)
- Stuart Black (2001-02)
- Adrian Cann (2002)
- Willy Giummarra (1999-00)
- Atiba Hutchinson (2002)
- Cameron Medwin (2002)
- Irvin Studin (1999)
