= Mario Župetić =

Croatian footballer (born 1983)

Personal information
- Date of birth: 4 March 1983 (age 43)
- Place of birth: SR Croatia, SFR Yugoslavia
- Position: Forward

Senior career*
Years	Team	Apps	(Gls)
2003	Hamilton Thunder		
2003	Toronto Croatia		
2004–2005	DSV Leoben	6	(0)
2005–2006	Radnik Velika Gorica		
2006-2007	Toronto Croatia		
2007-2008	RNK Split		
- * Club domestic league appearances and goals

Mario Župetić (born 4 March 1983) is a Croatian former footballer.

== Playing career ==
Župetić played abroad in 2003 with Hamilton Thunder in the Canadian Professional Soccer League. Shortly after he was traded to Toronto Croatia, where he assisted in securing a postseason berth. He featured in the CPSL Championship quarterfinal match against Brampton Hitmen. In 2004, he signed with DSV Leoben in the Austrian Football First League. He made his debut on 15 April 2005 against SV Wörgl. In 2006, he played in the First County Football League with NK Radnik Velika Gorica.
