= Blaženko Bekavac =

Croatian footballer (born 1975)

Blazenko Bekavac
Personal information
- Full name: Blazenko Bekavac
- Date of birth: 4 February 1975 (age 51)
- Place of birth: SR Croatia, SFR Yugoslavia
- Position: Defender

Senior career*
Years	Team	Apps	(Gls)
1998–2000	Mladost 127	14	(0)
2000	1. FC Schweinfurt 05	7	(0)
2004	Hamilton Thunder		
2005–2006	Qarabağ	8	(0)
2006–2008	Lamia		
2009–2010	HAŠK		
- * Club domestic league appearances and goals

Blazenko Bekavac (born February 4, 1975) is a former Croatian footballer who played in the Croatian First Football League, Regionalliga Süd, Canadian Professional Soccer League, and the Football League.

== Playing career ==
Bekavac played with NK Mladost 127 in the Croatian First Football League in 1999, where he would appear in a total of 14 matches. In 2000, he went to Germany to sign with 1. FC Schweinfurt 05 in the Regionalliga Süd. In 2004, he went overseas to Canada to sign with Hamilton Thunder of the Canadian Professional Soccer League. During his tenure with Hamilton he won the Western Conference title, and qualified for the postseason. He featured in the semi-final match against Toronto Croatia, and lost the match to a score of 2-0. In 2006, he returned to Europe to sign with PAS Lamia 1964 of the Football League. In 2009, he played and retired with NK HAŠK.
