= Leonardo Simon =

Canadian former soccer player (born 1967)

Personal information
- Full name: Leonardo Simon
- Date of birth: December 20, 1967 (age 58)
- Place of birth: Canada
- Position: Defender

Senior career*
Years	Team	Apps	(Gls)
1996–1997	Toronto Supra	23	(1)
1996–1997	Toronto Shooting Stars (indoor)	27	(1)
2001–2003	Toronto Supra		
- * Club domestic league appearances and goals

Leonardo Simon is a Canadian former soccer player who played in the National Professional Soccer League, Canadian National Soccer League, and the Canadian Professional Soccer League.

== Playing career ==
Simon began his career in 1996 with Toronto Supra of the Canadian National Soccer League. During the season, he was selected to the CNSL All-Star roster which faced Toronto Italia which featured Diego Maradona. He helped Toronto reach the postseason where they faced St. Catharines Wolves, but were eliminated by a score of 2-1 on goals on aggregate. Once the season came to a conclusion he signed with the Toronto Shooting Stars of the National Professional Soccer League for the indoor winter season. He appeared in 22 matches and scored one goal for the organization. Simon returned to Toronto Supra for the 1997 CNSL season, and was appointed team captain. His achievements during the season were winning the cup championship, and qualifying for the postseason. In the playoffs, he featured in the semi-final match against Toronto Croatia, and advanced to the finals by defeating Toronto by a score of 8-1 on goals on aggregate. In the finals Toronto faced St. Catharines, but unfortunately were defeated by a score of 4-3.

In 2001, Simon returned to Toronto to compete in the Canadian Professional Soccer League. He helped Toronto secure a postseason berth by finishing third in the overall standings. In their debut season in the CPSL the club reached the playoff finals where they faced St. Catharines Wolves, but were defeated by a score of 1-0. He would finish off his career in 2003, where he helped Toronto once more qualify for the playoffs.
