= César García =

César García may refer to:

- Cesar Garcia (curator) (born 1985), Mexican-born American scholar, writer, curator
- César García (cyclist) (born 1974), Spanish former cyclist
- César García (footballer, born 1993), Dominican footballer
- César García (footballer, born 1999), Spanish footballer
- Cesar Garcia (intelligence chief), former director-general of the National Intelligence Coordinating Agency of the Philippines
- Cesar Garcia, actor who played No-Doze in the American neo-Western crime drama television series Breaking Bad
