= Alexander Posada =

Colombian footballer (born 1977)

Personal information
- Date of birth: 6 March 1977 (age 49)
- Place of birth: Colombia
- Position: Defender

Senior career*
Years	Team	Apps	(Gls)
1994–1997	Deportivo Pereira		
1997–1998	Deportes Quindío		
1998–2001	América de Cali		
2001–2002	Cortuluá	4	(3)
2002	Deportivo Pereira		
2003	Millonarios F.C.		
2004–2005	Deportivo Quito	3	(0)
2006	Toronto Supra Portuguese	8	(1)

International career
1999–2002	Colombia	5	(0)
- * Club domestic league appearances and goals

Alexander Posada (born 6 March 1977) is a Colombian former professional footballer who played as a defender, spending the majority of his career in the Colombian football leagues, and had stints in Ecuadorian Serie A, and the Canadian Professional Soccer League.

== Club career ==
Posada began his career in Colombia with Deportivo Pereira in the Categoría Primera B in 1993. In 1997, he was transferred to Deportes Quindío, and after one season with Quinio he signed with América de Cali of the Categoría Primera A. During his tenure with America he won the Colombian League twice in 2000, 2001, and the Copa Merconorte. In 2001, he signed with Cortuluá, and featured in the club's run in the Copa Libertadores. In 2002, he returned to his former club Deportivo Pereira, and had a stint with Millonarios F.C., where the team finished second in the overall standings. In 2004, he went abroad to sign with Deportivo Quito of the Ecuadorian Serie A.

On 24 April 2006, Posada signed with Toronto Supra Portuguese of the Canadian Soccer League. He made his debut for Toronto in a friendly match against S.C. Braga on 12 May 2006. He recorded his first goal for the club on 16 July 2006, in a 2–2 draw with London City Soccer Club. He helped Toronto secure a postseason berth by finishing fourth in the International Division. The club's opponents in the playoffs were the Serbian White Eagles, but they were eliminated by a score of 3–0.

== International career ==
Posada played for the Colombia national team from 1999 till 2002, and featured in five matches.
