= Christian Lombardo =

Argentine footballer

Personal information
- Full name: Christian Omar Lombardo
- Date of birth: February 24, 1974 (age 52)
- Place of birth: Valentín Alsina, Buenos Aires, Argentina
- Position: Midfielder

Senior career*
Years	Team	Apps	(Gls)
1993–1996	Victoriano Arenas	12	(0)
1997	Toronto Lynx	5	(0)
2001–2004	Toronto Supra	75	(8)
- * Club domestic league appearances and goals

Christian Lombardo (born February 24, 1974) is an Argentinian former footballer who had stints in Argentina, and Canada.

== Playing career ==
In 1993, Lombardo began his career in the Primera D Metropolitana with Victoriano Arenas. In 1997, he played abroad in the USISL A-League with the Toronto Lynx. He made his debut on July 5, 1997, in a match against the Richmond Kickers, coming on as a substitute for Paul Stalteri. Throughout the season he appeared in five matches. He helped Toronto finish fourth in the Northeastern division, which resulted in a playoff berth. Their opponents in the first round of the postseason were the Montreal impact, where the Lynx lost the series by a score of 6–1 on goals of aggregate.

In 2001, he signed with the Toronto Supra of the Canadian Professional Soccer League. He recorded his first goal for the club on June 6, 2001, in a match against St. Catharines Wolves. Lombardo helped Toronto finish third in the overall standings, and secured a postseason berth. In the CPSL Championship final Supra faced St. Catharines Wolves, but lost to a score of 1–0. In 2004, he assisted Toronto Supra in securing their first divisional title the Eastern Conference title.
