= Fabio Silva (footballer, born 1977) =

Brazilian footballer

Personal information
- Full name: Fabio Senhorinho Silva
- Date of birth: 29 January 1977 (age 49)
- Place of birth: São Paulo, Brazil
- Position: Midfielder

Senior career*
Years	Team	Apps	(Gls)
1995–1996	Corinthians		
2003	Toronto Supra	8	(4)
2003–2004	Portimonense S.C.	26	(0)
2004–2006	Toronto Supra	41	(5)
2007–2008	Jabaquara		
- * Club domestic league appearances and goals

Fabio Senhorinho Silva (born January 29, 1977) is a former Brazilian footballer who played in the Segunda Liga, Canadian Professional Soccer League, and in the Brazilian Football Leagues.

== Playing career ==
Silva began his career in his native Brazil with the Corinthians, from where he played from 1995 till 1996. In 2003, he went abroad to Canada to sign with the Toronto Supra of the Canadian Professional Soccer League. During his tenure with Toronto he had an impressive run with the organization, which brought the attention of Portimonense S.C. of the Segunda Liga. With Portimonense he appeared in 25 matches. He returned to the Toronto Supra for the 2004 season, where he helped Toronto achieve a ten-game undefeated streak. He help Toronto claim their first piece of silverware by clinching the Eastern Conference title, and finished first in the overall league standings. In the playoffs the Supra faced the Vaughan Shooters, but were eliminated by a score of 4-1. In 2007, he returned to Brazil to sign with Jabaquara Atlético Clube.
