= Blerim Rrustemi =

Albanian footballer (born 1983)

Personal information
- Full name: Blerim Nexhmi Rrustemi
- Date of birth: 4 February 1983 (age 43)
- Place of birth: Vushtrri, SFR Yugoslavia
- Height: 1.84 m (6 ft 0 in)
- Position: Defender

Team information
- Current team: Union Nettetal (assistant)

Youth career
- –1999: 2 Korriku
- 1999: Weston Collegiate Institute
- 1999–2000: Azzurri Toronto
- 2000–2001: Toronto Supra
- 2001–2002: Portuguesa

Senior career*
Years	Team	Apps	(Gls)
2002–2004	Defensor Sporting	45	(5)
2004–2007	Borussia Mönchengladbach II	51	(2)
2007–2008	AC Horsens	2	(0)
2008	Rot-Weiss Erfurt	7	(1)
2008–2009	Alki Larnaca	12	(2)
2009	Vllaznia	9	(0)
2010–2011	FC Wegberg-Beeck	27	(4)
2011–2013	Goslarer SC	54	(4)
2013	SSVg Velbert	13	(2)
2014	Germania Ratingen 04/19	18	(2)
2014–2015	Rheydter SV	22	(9)
2015–2019	Union Nettetal	104	(10)
2019–2022	1. FC Viersen	30	(1)
Total		394	(42)

International career
2007	Albania	3	(0)
- * Club domestic league appearances and goals

Blerim Nexhmi Rrustemi (Albanian pronunciation: [blɛˈɾim rruˈstɛmi]; born 4 February 1983) is a football manager and former player who is the assistant manager of Oberliga Niederrhein club Union Nettetal. Born in Yugoslavia, he represented Albania internationally.

Over the course of his career he played in Canada, Brazil, Uruguay, Germany, Denmark, Cyprus and Albania, appearing at both professional and semi-professional levels. He represented the Albania national team in 2007, earning three caps.

== Club career ==
Rrustemi began his football career with 2 Korriku, and due to the Kosovo War, he emigrated to Canada, where he initially played for Weston Collegiate Institute in 1999 and then continued with Azzurri Toronto in 1999–2000, and Toronto Supra in 2000–2001, both competing in the Canadian Professional League. He also appeared for local Albanian community teams in the Toronto area.

At the age of 17, he moved to South America, joining Portuguesa in Brazil for the 2001–02 season, where he was offered a three-year contract, but because of his young age he did not remain away from his family for more than six months, before signing for Defensor Sporting in Uruguay in 2002. With Defensor, he played in the Uruguayan Primera División until 2004, gaining top-flight experience in South America.

Rrustemi returned to Europe in 2004 when he was signed by Borussia Mönchengladbach II after a trial period, joining the club's reserve side in the German Regionalliga. He spent three seasons with Mönchengladbach's second team, making more than 50 league appearances. After the reserves were relegated, he left on a free transfer in 2007 to join Danish 1st Division club AC Horsens, where he played in two league matches during the 2007–08 season.

In January 2008, he moved back to Germany with Rot-Weiss Erfurt, then playing in the Regionalliga Nord and later in the newly created 3. Liga. With Erfurt he won the Thuringian Cup in 2007–08. For the 2008–09 season Rrustemi joined Alki Larnaca in the Cypriot First Division, where he scored twice in 12 league matches. After financial problems at the Cypriot club, he left as a free agent and, in October 2009, signed a one-year contract with Vllaznia Shkodër in the Kategoria Superiore of Albania, with an option for extension.

After leaving Albania, Rrustemi returned once more to Germany, where he spent the remainder of his playing career in the regional leagues. In 2010, he joined FC Wegberg-Beeck in the NRW-Liga, making 27 league appearances and scoring four goals in the 2010–11 season. In 2011, he moved to Goslarer SC, helping the club to win the Oberliga Niedersachsen title in 2011–12 and achieve promotion to the Regionalliga Nord.

Rrustemi subsequently played for SSVg Velbert in the Regionalliga West in 2013, Germania Ratingen 04/19 in the Oberliga Niederrhein in 2014, and Rheydter SV in the German regional leagues in 2014–15, where he posted a notable scoring record for a defender. From 2015 to 2019, he was a regular for Union Nettetal, with whom he achieved promotion to the Oberliga Niederrhein in 2018.

In the summer of 2019, having established himself in the Niederrhein amateur scene, he joined 1. FC Viersen from Union Nettetal. He helped Viersen win promotion from the Bezirksliga to the Landesliga Niederrhein and remained with the club into the early 2020s.

== Coaching career ==
After ending his long playing career in the German amateur leagues, Rrustemi remained involved in football. In 2025, he joined the coaching staff of his former club Union Nettetal as an assistant coach, forming part of a three-man staff in the Oberliga Niederrhein.

== International career ==
"They asked me if I wanted to take a Brazilian passport, but I immediately said no because I felt as if I would lose myself. From that moment I could not wait to wear the national team shirt of my own country."

— Rrustemi explaining his decision to turn down Brazil's offer.

He was eligible to represent three countries on international level, either Kosovo (then not a FIFA member, but it did play occasional friendlies), Albania or Canada. During his time at Portuguesa, he played in an unofficial friendly against the Brazil U17 and provided an assist in a 1–1 draw; following the match he was offered the opportunity to take Brazilian citizenship and represent Brazil, but he declined.

He later opted to represent the Albania national team instead and was granted Albanian citizenship on 23 March 2007. His debut for Albania came on 22 August 2007 in a 3–0 home friendly win against the Malta at the Qemal Stafa Stadium in Tirana. He went on to appear in two UEFA Euro 2008 qualifying matches: a goalless draw away to the Slovenia in October 2007 and a 4–2 home defeat against the Belarus in November 2007, which proved to be his final international match.

== Personal life ==
Born in Kosovo to an ethnic Albanian family, Rrustemi was raised in Canada after his family left Kosovo at the beginning of the Kosovo War, and he later obtained Canadian citizenship.

Rrustemi has long-standing ties with fellow footballer Granit Xhaka, with whom he has a close friendship. In 2024 he attended Bayer Leverkusen's Bundesliga title celebrations as a guest of Xhaka.

== Honours ==
Rot-Weiss Erfurt

- Thuringian Cup: 2007–08

Goslarer SC

- Oberliga Niedersachsen: 2011–12
