= Adonay Alfaro =

Costa Rican footballer

Personal information
- Full name: Adonay Alfaro Murcia
- Place of birth: San José, Costa Rica
- Position: Midfielder

Senior career*
Years	Team	Apps	(Gls)
1996	Toronto Supra	14	(5)
1997	San Antonio Pumas	7	(0)
- * Club domestic league appearances and goals

Adonay Alfaro Murcia is a former Costa Rican Soccer player who played in Costa Rican Primera Division and Segunda Division organized by FEDEFUTBOL. He also played in the USISL D-3 Pro League, and the Canadian National Soccer League. He is an experienced Web and Graphic Designer now living in San Jose, CR.

== Playing career ==
Murcia moved to Canada in 1992, and played with Toronto Blizzards on the APSL. Also Played for Toronto Croatia and Toronto Supra of the Canadian National Soccer League. He would help Supra finish third in the league standings, and secured a postseason berth for the club. They were eliminated in the semi-finals and lost the series on 2–1 on goals on aggregate to the St. Catharines Wolves. In 1997, he abroad to the United States and signed with San Antonio Pumas of the USISL D-3 Pro League. During his tenure with San Antonio he helped the club reach the playoffs, before they were eliminated in the division finals to the Houston Hurricanes. After the 1997 season he retired from competitive football, and enrolled to San Antonio College, graduated with honors and is currently working in Web design.
