= José Testas =

Portuguese footballer and manager

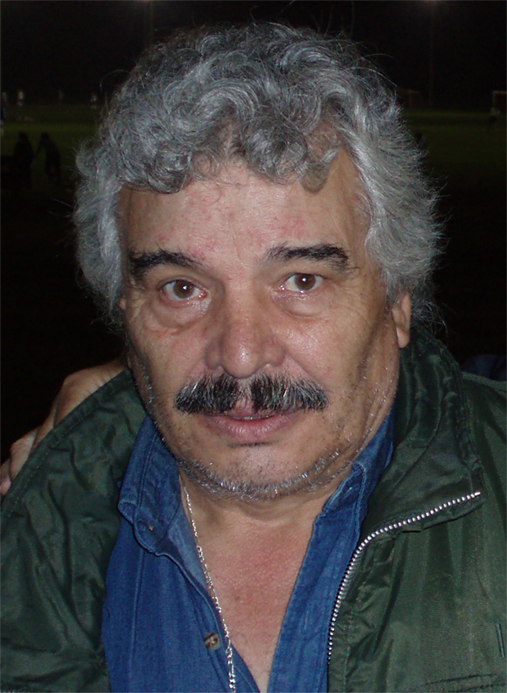
- Testas in 2006

Personal information
- Full name: José Soutinho Testas
- Date of birth: 29 November 1942 (age 83)
- Place of birth: Arrentela, Portugal
- Position: Forward

Youth career
- 1959–1962: Benfica

Senior career*
Years	Team	Apps	(Gls)
1962–1963	Vitória de Guimarães	4	(0)
1963–1968	Barreirense	43	(2)
1968–1972	Farense	43	(6)
1972–1975	Gil Vicente		
1973–1974	→ AD Fafe (loan)		
1975–1976	Toronto Italia		
1977–1978	Montreal Castors		
1977	Ottawa Tigers		
1977–1978	Leixões	15	(5)
1979–1980	Buffalo Stallions (indoor)		
1980	Toronto First Portuguese		
1983	Toronto First Portuguese		

Managerial career
- 1980: Toronto First Portuguese
- 1993: Ponte Barca
- 2003–2004: Toronto Supra
- 2005–2006: Toronto Supra
- 2008: Portugal FC
- * Club domestic league appearances and goals

José Soutinho Testas (born November 11, 1942) is a former Portuguese footballer and manager, who played the majority of his career in Portugal, and retired in the Canadian National Soccer League. He also coached the Toronto Supra in the Canadian Professional Soccer League.

== Playing career ==
Testas began playing football at the youth level with S.L. Benfica, but signed his first professional contract with Vitória S.C. in the Primeira Liga. In 1963, he signed with F.C. Barreirense in the Segunda Divisão Portuguesa, where he won the league in 1968, and the Taça Ribeiro dos Reis. In 1968, he signed with S.C. Farense and had stints with Gil Vicente, and AD Fafe. In 1975, he played abroad in the National Soccer League with Toronto Italia, where he won the First Division title. The following season he assisted in defending Toronto's division title after defeating Hamilton Croatia.

In 1977, he signed with Montreal Castors, and secured the First Division title twice in 1977, and 1978. In late 1977, Testas along with six Montreal players were traded to the Ottawa Tigers in order to assist in their playoff match against Toronto Croatia to gain promotion to the NSL First Division. The transaction provided Montreal the bargaining rights to Mick Jones. He returned to Europe for the remainder of the 1977 season to sign with Leixões S.C. In 1979, he returned to North America to sign with the Buffalo Stallions of the Major Indoor Soccer League.

In 1980, he concluded his career in the National Soccer League with Toronto First Portuguese, and assisted the club in finishing second in the regular season standings. He returned to former club First Portuguese for the 1983 season.

== Managerial career ==
In 1980, he transitioned into a player-coach for Toronto First Portuguese in the National Soccer League. In 1993, he managed Portuguese side AD De Ponte de Barca.

In 2003, he was appointed the head coach of the Toronto Supra in the Canadian Professional Soccer League. He would have a successful season achieving a 16-game undefeated streak, and maintaining their record until the final two games of the season. He led Toronto to a second-place finish in the Eastern Conference and posted the second best offensive record within the league. In the postseason Supra faced Vaughan Sun Devils, but were defeated in overtime in a 4–3 loss. On October 5, 2003, at the CPSL Awards Banquet he was awarded the CPSL Coach of the Year.

He returned to manage Toronto for the 2004 season, and won the organization's first piece of silverware by clinching the Eastern Conference title. In the playoffs Toronto faced the Vaughan Shooters, but were eliminated by a score of 4–1. For 2005, he was brought back halfway through the season, but failed to improve the team's performance, and failed to qualify for the postseason.

In 2008, he returned to the organization, and greatly improved the team's performance by finishing in the top five with the best offensive and defensive records. The team secured a postseason berth by finishing fourth in the International Division and finishing fifth in the overall standings. In the quarterfinals Portugal faced Toronto Croatia and advanced to the next round with a 2–1 victory with goals. In the semifinals their opponents were National Division champions Trois-Rivières Attak, but were eliminated from a 7–0 defeat.

== Honors ==
=== Player ===
Toronto Italia

- National Soccer League First Division: 1975, 1976

Montreal Castors

- National Soccer League First Division: 1977, 1978

=== Manager ===
Toronto Supra

- Canadian Professional Soccer League Eastern Conference: 2004

Individual

- CPSL Coach of the Year: 2003
