= Bijan Azizi =

Iranian football manager

Personal information
- Full name: Bijan Azizi
- Place of birth: Iran

Managerial career
- Years: Team
- 2000: York Region Shooters
- 2011–2012: Shahrdari Tabriz F.C. (interim)

Bijan Azizi is an Iranian football manager who managed in the Canadian Professional Soccer League, and the Iran Pro League.

== Career ==
Azizi managed the York Region Shooters of the Canadian Professional Soccer League in 2000. In 2011, he served as an assistant coach under Ali Asghar Modir Roosta for Shahrdari Tabriz F.C. in the Iran Pro League. After the firing of Modir Roosta, he was elevated to the position of head coach on an interim basis. After the relegation of Shahrdari to the Azadegan League he resigned from his position.

In 2018, he served as an assistant coach for Steel Azin.

== Personal life ==
On 10 January 2026, Azizi sent an exclusive message to Iran International supporting the 2025–2026 Iranian protests along with several other Iranian coaches across football.
