= Hamilton Thunder =

Former Canadian association football team

- Full name: Hamilton Thunder Soccer Club
- Nicknames: The Thunder, Thunder Bolts, Thunder Crew
- Founded: 2001
- Dissolved: 2005
- Stadium: Brian Timmis Stadium, Hamilton, Ontario
- Capacity: 5000+
- Chairman: Italo Ferrari
- Manager: Salvator DeSimone
- League: Canadian Professional Soccer League
Home colours	Away colours

The Hamilton Thunder were a soccer team located in Hamilton, Ontario, playing in the Western Conference of the Canadian Professional Soccer League. The team played its home fixtures at Brian Timmis Stadium until a rent dispute with the city caused home games to be moved to Vaughan midway through the 2005 season. The Thunder won the regular season Western Conference championship each season from 2003 to 2005, but lost in the Rogers Cup semifinal each of those years.

== History ==
Hamilton Thunder joined the Canadian Professional Soccer League in 2002, which marked the return of professional soccer to the city of Hamilton since the folding of the Hamilton Steelers of the original Canadian Soccer League in 1991. The club played its first competitive match on May 11, 2002, in a friendly against the Toronto Lynx of the USL A-League. Toronto won the match in a 1–0 victory, but Hamilton managed to attract over 2000 spectators to Brian Timmis Stadium a relatively high number for CPSL standards. The club hired Marko Maschke as head coach who previously coached professionally in Germany and China. Maschke brought in several players from the 2001 St. Catharines Wolves playoff champions roster, and signed promising players like Ian Bennett, Miles O'Connor, Matthew O'Connor, Orlin Chalmers, and young goalkeeping prospect Roberto Ferrari. In their debut match the Thunder wrecked the Vaughan Sun Devils in 5–1 victory at home.

Hamilton started off well with a three-game undefeated streak and had four players loaned out to the Calgary Storm of the A-League - Orlin Chalmers, Matthew O'Connor, Salvatore Borgh, and Wojtek Zarzycki. After struggling for a bit the Thunder managed to recuperate and finish third in the Western Conference standings, but missed out at the postseason by losing 3–2 to the Mississauga Olympians in a wildcard match. The 2002 season sparked numerous controversies within the club's organization. One incident occurred on September 20, 2002, where most senior players boycotted a match scheduled that day, due to reports of unpaid salaries to players and staff members, and unpaid rent fees for stadium use. The incident resulted in the resignation of head coach Maschke, and the release of several senior players. The CPSL chairman Vincent Ursini responded that conditions will be applied to Hamilton owner Italo Ferrari.

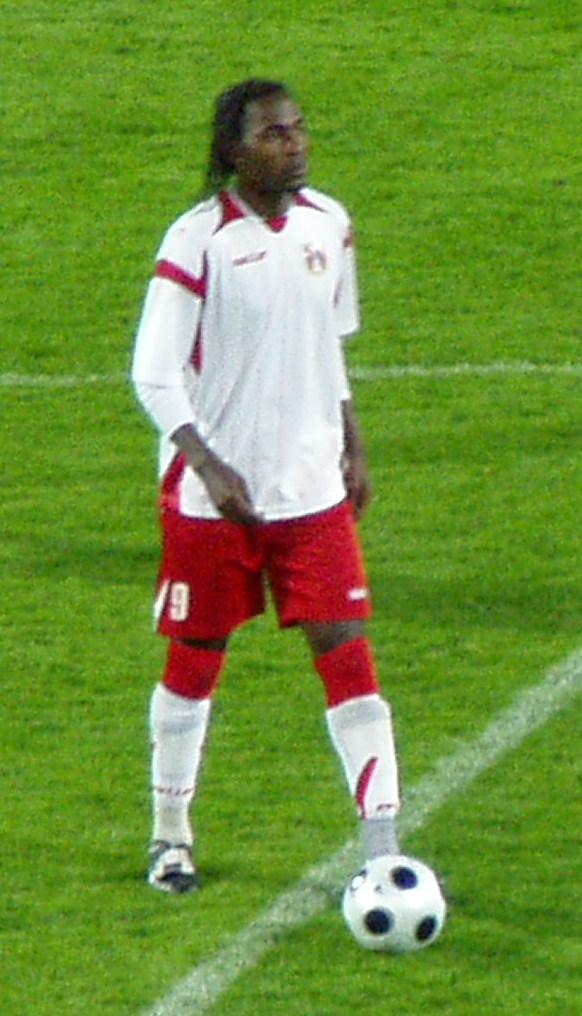
Canadian international Dave Simpson played earlier in his career with Hamilton Thunder.

In 2003, Hamilton hired the services of Duncan Wilde as the new head coach with coaching credentials from England. Wilde signed several new additions to the squad - acquiring Aaron Steele, Sergio De Luca, and Dave Simpson. The 2003 campaign started off well with a seven-game undefeated streak placing the Thunder on top of the Western Conference. Unfortunately Wilde announced his resignation as head coach after disagreements with team owner Italo Ferrari, and was replaced by Ivan Marković. Further changes were made by the hiring of former Canadian National Soccer League Commissioner Rocco Lofranco as the club's new CEO, and the signing of Croatian players Petar Dajak, Mario Zupetic, Vedran Bacek, and Zeljiko Dukic.

After only two weeks of coaching Markovic decided to return to Croatia due to unexpected health concerns. His replacement was former Portugal national football team and Benfica F.C. assistant coach Manuel Gonçalves Gomes. Hamilton's situation improved under Gomes as he led them to a seven-game undefeated streak to retain their position on top of the standings in their conference. On the conclusion of the 2003 season Hamilton clinched their first trophy the Western Conference title and qualified for the postseason. Their playoff run came to a conclusion in the semi-finals against Vaughan Sun Devils losing to a score of 2–0.

For the 2004 season, the organization brought in former Hamilton Italo Canadian soccer player and Hamilton Steelers VP Frank Riga to manage the team, and former Steelers player John Di Pasquale was hired to coach. They signed Ottawa Wizards top goalscorer Kevin Nelson, added Charles Gbeke, Blazenko Bekavac, Saša Milaimović and Brazilian Edmilson de Carvalho Barbosa to his roster. Team owner Italo Ferrari fired Di Pasquale in mid-season, and Frank Riga resigned. Italo then brought in former North York Astros coach Jorge Armua. Armua repeated Hamilton's previous success by once again claiming the Western Conference title and securing a playoff berth. In the postseason the Thunder faced Toronto Croatia in the semi-finals, but were defeated by a score of 2–0. Armua resumed his duties as head coach for Hamilton for the 2005 season. Where he once again added more silverware to Hamilton's cabinet by successfully defending their Western Conference title for the third year in a row. The achievement allowed the Thunder Crew a bye to the semi-finals, where the club would face the Oakville Blue Devils - unfortunately Hamilton were deprived of five core players from the starting lineup because the players were affiliated with the Woodbridge Azzuri which consequently discontinued their association with Hamilton resulting in a shortage of players for the club which led to their defeat to Oakville. Once more Hamilton was without controversy as the club was forced out of Brian Timmis Stadium due to unpaid rental fees with a debt over $26,074.21 over several years, which resulted in team to relocate to the Ontario Soccer Centre in Vaughan.

During the 2005 playoffs, the Hamilton Spectator revealed that Italo Ferrari, thought to be the owner of the team, was involved in personal bankruptcy proceedings with no assets, and debts of $2 million; Ferrari claimed to in fact not be the owner. Two weeks after the semifinal loss, the league announced the revocation of the franchise. On October 22, 2005, the CPSL Board of Governors revoked the franchise of the Hamilton Thunder Soccer Club as a member of the CPSL. Top sales rep of the franchise was Gerry Fonzo, now a successful Director of Business Development and Client Retention at the Hamilton Tiger-Cats.

== Head coaches ==
Years	Name	Nation
2002	Marko Maschke	Germany
2003	Duncan Wilde	England
2003	Ivan Marković	Croatia
2003	Manuel Gomes	Portugal
2004-2005	Jorge Armua	Uruguay

== Achievements ==
- Canadian Professional Soccer League Western Conference Champions/Regular Season
  - Champions (3): 2003, 2004, 2005

== Year-by-year ==
Year	Division	League	Regular season	Playoffs
2002	1 - Western Conference	CPSL	Third	Quarter-finals
2003	1 - Western Conference	CPSL	First	Semi-finals
2004	1 - Western Conference	CPSL	First	Semi-finals
2005	1 - Western Conference	CPSL	First	Semi-finals
