= Tony De Thomasis =

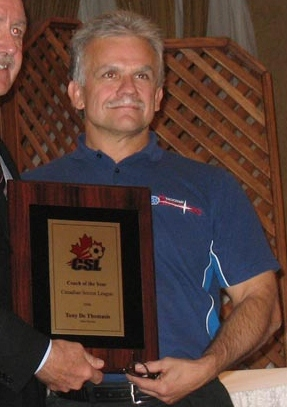
- De Thomasis in 2006
- Born: Abbateggio, Italy
- Other name: Anthony De Thomasis
- Citizenship: Canada and Italy
- Education: York University
- Occupations: businessman, financial advisors, entrepreneur, soccer manager

Anthony De Thomasis is an Italian-Canadian businessman, financial management advisor, and president of De Thomas Wealth Management. He served as the Director of Soccer Operations for Mississauga MetroStars in the Major Arena Soccer League.

De Thomasis also ventured into the business side of soccer, where he purchased the York Region Shooters of the Canadian Professional Soccer League. He eventually solidified the franchise into a powerhouse within the league. He also managed the team for several seasons, and achieved significant results by winning the CSL Championship in 2006, and 2017. In 2018, he briefly was associated with Filipe Bento's organization Unionville Milliken SC, and placed the team into League1 Ontario.

== Business career ==
De Thomasis was born in Abbateggio in the Province of Pescara. He later emigrated to Canada and graduated from York University in 1976 with honors in Mathematics and Science. Upon graduation he began working in the wealth management field with various independent firms in the capacity of an adviser, manager, and director. In 1987, along with six advisers he formed De Thomas Financial Corp, and later was renamed De Thomas Wealth Management. In 2013, some of the firm's financial advice was chastised in a report conducted by the Ombudsman for Banking Services and Investments, but the Investment Industry Regulatory Organization of Canada found no fault in the firm's actions. In 2016, he was listed in the Top 50 financial advisers in Canada.

== Soccer career ==
Tony De Thomasis
Personal information
- Full name: Anthony De Thomasis
- Place of birth: Abbateggio, Italy

Managerial career
- Years: Team
- 2006–2007: Vaughan Italia Shooters
- 2015–2017: York Region Shooters

De Thomasis initially became involved in soccer by coaching at the youth level. In 2002, he purchased the York Region Shooters franchise in the Canadian Professional Soccer League from Frank Bisceglia. The following season the Shooters merged with the Vaughan Sun Devils to unify the York Region territory with De Thomasis becoming the principal owner. After the acquisition Vaughan reached the CPSL Championship final in four consecutive seasons, and clinched their first piece of silverware the Eastern Conference title in 2005. In 2005, he was awarded the CPSL Commissioner's Award.

As part of the reforms conducted by CSL Commissioner Cary Kaplan the Vaughan Shooters became inaugural members of the International Division, and were renamed the Italia Shooters in 2006. Throughout the season De Thomasis undertook the coaching duties, and claimed the organizations first championship title, and was recognized by the league with the Coach of the Year Award. In 2010, he received the Harry Gauss Memorial Award for his continual allegiance, commitment and support to the league. In 2017, he managed York Region to their second championship title.

In 2018, he formed a partnership with former player Filipe Bento to launch Unionville Milliken SC in League1 Ontario. In 2019, he was named Director of Soccer Operations for Mississauga MetroStars in the Major Arena Soccer League.

== Honours ==
=== Manager ===
Italia/York Region Shooters

- CSL Championship: 2006, 2017
