= Petar Dajak =

Croatian footballer

Personal information
- Full name: Petar Dajak
- Place of birth: SR Croatia, SFR Yugoslavia
- Position: Defender

Senior career*
Years	Team	Apps	(Gls)
2001–2002	NK TŠK Topolovac	7	(0)
2003	Hamilton Thunder		
- * Club domestic league appearances and goals

Petar Dajak is a Croatian former footballer who played in the Croatian First Football League, and the Canadian Professional Soccer League.

== Playing career ==
Dajak played with NK TŠK Topolovac in the Croatian First Football League in 2001-2002, and appeared in seven matches. In 2003, Ivan Marković signed Dajak to a contract to play for the Hamilton Thunder of the Canadian Professional Soccer League. He helped Hamilton to a seven game undefeated streak to retain their position on top of the standings in their conference. On the conclusion of the 2003 season Hamilton clinched their first trophy the Western Conference title and qualified for the postseason. Dajak featured in the playoff semi-final match against the Vaughan Shooters, but Hamilton were eliminated from competition after losing the match by a score of 2-0.
