= Dave Simpson (soccer) =

Canadian soccer player

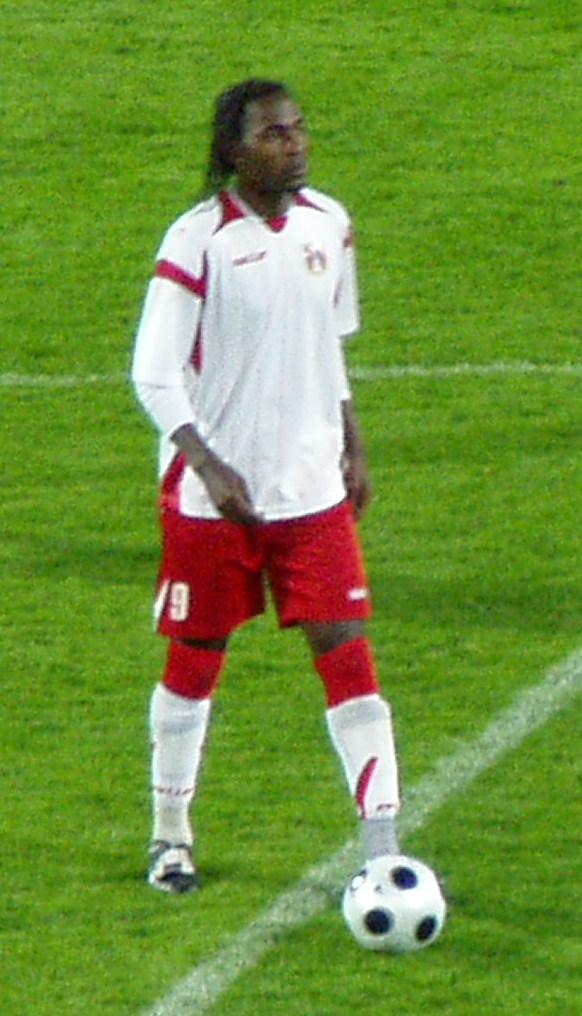
- Simpson in 2008

Personal information
- Full name: David Anthony Simpson Knight
- Date of birth: January 11, 1983 (age 43)
- Place of birth: Scarborough, Ontario
- Height: 1.88 m (6 ft 2 in)
- Positions: Forward; winger; midfielder

Youth career
- North Scarborough SC
- Erin Mills SC
- 2001: Stuttgart

Senior career*
Years	Team	Apps	(Gls)
2002	Royal Antwerp	2	(0)
2003	Hamilton Thunder	11	(4)
2005	Toronto Lynx	18	(3)
2006	Lombard-Pápa	12	(1)
2006–2008	Sparta Prague	1	(0)
2007	→ Kladno (loan)	15	(2)
2008	→ SIAD Most (loan)	4	(0)
2008	Dunaújváros	23	(5)
2009	Integrál	15	(6)
2010	Chonburi	8	(1)
2011	Mississauga Eagles FC	9	(6)
2012	Brantford Galaxy	10	(7)

International career^{‡}
2003	Canada U20	4	(1)
2008	Canada	1	(0)
- * Club domestic league appearances and goals ‡ National team caps and goals as of 2 January 2010

Dave Simpson (born January 11, 1983, as David Anthony Simpson Knight) is a Canadian retired footballer.

== Youth career ==
Simpson began his youth career with North Scarborough SC, where he played until he was 17. During his time with NSSC, he earned a trial with Southampton F.C. following an appearance at the Welsh International Super Cup, where he was named the Golden Boot Winner, scoring 14 goals in 5 matches.

He then joined the Erin Mills Soccer Club, as part of their Professional Soccer Academy (PSA). In 2001, he travelled to Stuttgart, Germany with PSA, where they played against various teams including against the youth academy of VfB Stuttgart, where he impressed the Stuttgart coach, who got Simpson to play the second half with his team. After a brief trial with the VfB Stuttgart U19 side, he signed later on that summer and remained with them till the end of 2001.

== Professional career ==
After leaving Stuttgart, he had agreed to join Hungarian side MTK Budapest, but three days later they had a match in Belgium, where he instead signed a five-year contract with Belgium first division side Royal Antwerp FC, although due to complications with getting his ITC from Canada, he was limited to playing in only exhibition matches for three months. However, the club went through financial difficulties and he left the club in the summer of 2002.

In 2003, he returned to Canada to sign with Hamilton Thunder of the Canadian Professional Soccer League. He recorded his first goal for Hamilton on June 7, 2003, against the Durham Flames. He helped Hamilton win their first title as Western Conference champions, although they were eliminated in the semi-finals of the playoffs by the Vaughan Sun Devils, by a score of 2–0. After a contract disputes with the organization, he missed the entire 2004 season, due to Hamilton owning his player rights.

On April 19, 2005, he joined the Toronto Lynx of the USL First Division. He made his debut for the Lynx on April 23, 2005, against the Portland Timbers. He recorded his first two goals for the Lynx in a 4–4 draw against the Puerto Rico Islanders on May 28, 2005.

In 2006, after an impressive season in Toronto he departed to Europe once more to sign with Lombard-Pápa TFC of the Borsodi Liga. At the end of season, Lombard-Pápa were relegated.

In the summer of 2006, he became the first Canadian-born player to be signed by Czech giants AC Sparta Prague. After an early season coaching change bringing in Michal Bílek as coach, Simpson was loaned to newly promoted side SK Kladno. He scored in his second game for the club, however, in a match against FK Teplice, he suffered a concussion, leaving the game on a stretcher, forcing him to miss the remainder of the season, apart from a single appearance against Sparta as a late game substitute.

In the summer of 2007, he extended his contract with Spart Prague for two more years. However, he was soon sent to the reserve team, before eventually going on loan to FK SIAD Most in early 2008. Simpson was a starter until he suffered a car crash which kept him out of action for two more weeks. Simpson was reportedly linked Nottingham Forest of the English Championship Division after a brief stay at the club's grounds early May 2008. In the summer of 2008, Simpson and Sparta agreed to terminate the remainder of his contract.

He went on trial with Viborg FF and Toronto FC, before ultimately signing with Hungarian side Dunaújváros FC, finishing as the club's top goal scorer with five goals. In February 2009, Dunaújváros folded due to financial problems. He then joined Integrál-DAC, where he finished with 11 goals as the club's top goal scorer, but then Integrál-DAC also folded in the summer of 2009 leaving him as a free agent.

On June 25, 2009, he played as part of the Zinedine Zidane squad in a charity match against the Canadian All-Stars. Zidane had a part in the tying goal during added time, passing to his right to Simpson, who found Yannick Lewis in front of the goal for the tap in.

In July 2010, he was signed by Thai Premier League side Chonburi becoming once more the first Canadian to play in the league. He scored his first goal in his second game against Pattaya United. During his time with Chonburi he won the Thai F.A Cup in 2010. The following year, he retired from competitive soccer due to injuries.

In April 2011, he came out of retirement to sign with his home club Mississauga Eagles FC of the Canadian Soccer League, and was named the team captain. In 2012, he signed with Brantford Galaxy, recording seven goals in ten matches. After the sacking of head coach Ron Davidson, eight players including with Simpson, sided with Davidson which led to their departure from the team.

== International career ==
He is a former member of U17, U18, and U20 Canada national teams, appeared in 4 matches scoring 1 goal in 2003. Played with the U20 National Team at the 2003 US Soccer Festival.

He has recently been called into multiple senior men's camps. In the summer of 2007, he was part of the player pool for the 2007 Gold Cup. He earned his first cap with Canada's senior team on 30 January 2008, during a 1–0 win over Martinique).

== Honours ==
Club

- AC Sparta Prague:
  - Gambrinus liga Championship: 2007
  - Champions League Qualification in 2007
- Chonburi:
  - Thailand FA Cup Champions in 2010

== Personal life ==
Simpson is the son of a Portuguese and Bajan mother Ann Knight, and a Jamaican father Bovrell Simpson. His family tree dates back to African heritage. He was born in Toronto, Ontario, and raised in North York.

In the winter of 2010 while on winter break from Chonburi, he was diagnosed with Stargardt eye disease, a disease which affects the central vision and can cause legal blindness. He had been suffering from the disease since the age of 18, but was unaware of its rare strain in his family. Dave became a father on September 24, 2011, with a daughter named Jaya. He married ex-Czech model Janelle Nathaniel in 2012.
