= Wojtek Zarzycki =

Canadian soccer player

Personal information
- Full name: Wojciech Zarzycki
- Date of birth: 21 June 1982 (age 44)
- Place of birth: Wrocław, Poland
- Height: 1.92 m (6 ft 4 in)
- Position: Goalkeeper

Youth career
- 1998: NTC Ontario
- 1999: St. Catharines Wolves
- 2000: Werder Bremen
- 2001: Dartmouth College

Senior career*
Years	Team	Apps	(Gls)
2002	Hamilton Thunder		
2002	Calgary Storm	6	(0)
2003–2005	Sydney Crescent Star	10	(0)
2005–2006	Dulwich Hill	3	(0)
2006–2007	Miedź Legnica	9	(0)
2007–2008	Ferencváros	24	(0)
2008–2009	St. Catharines Wolves		

International career
1999–2000	Canada U17	6	(0)
2000–2001	Canada U20	6	(0)
- * Club domestic league appearances and goals

Wojciech "Wojtek" Zarzycki (born 21 June 1982) is a former soccer player. Born in Poland, he represented Canada at youth international level.

== Career ==
His contract was not renewed for the 2008–2009 season. He moved back to his hometown and signed a contract with his former youth club St. Catharines Wolves.

=== Clubs ===
- 1999 – National Trainings Centre (NTC) Ontario
- 2000 – Werder Bremen (Youth)
- 2001 – Dartmouth College
- 2002 – Hamilton Thunder (Canadian Premier Soccer League)
- 2002 – Calgary Storm
- 2003–2005 – Sydney Crescent Star (Australia, NSW Premier League)
- 2007–2008 – Ferencváros
- 2008–2009 – St. Catharines Wolves

== International career ==
He has played for Canada's U-16, U-17 and U-20 teams.

== Personal life ==
Zarzycki holds dual Polish and Canadian citizenship, his hometown is St. Catharines, Ontario. Wojtek is now a successful entrepreneur having several businesses.
