= Waldo Sponton =

Argentine footballer

Personal information
- Full name: Fabricio Waldo Ariel Sponton
- Date of birth: 4 November 1974 (age 51)
- Place of birth: Santa Fe, Argentina
- Position: Forward

Senior career*
Years	Team	Apps	(Gls)
1994	Platense	16	(1)
1997–1998	Berazategui	2	(0)
1999	Deportivo Municipal		
2000–2001	Uruguay Soccer Club		
2001	Toronto Lynx	24	(2)
2002	Toronto Supra		
2007	A.C. Soccer Diavoli		
- * Club domestic league appearances and goals

Waldo Sponton (born November 4, 1974) is an Argentinian former footballer.

== Playing career ==
Sponton began his career in the Argentine Primera División in 1994 with Club Atlético Platense, where he appeared in 16 matches and scored one goal. In 1997, he signed with Asociación Deportiva Berazategui, and in 1999 he went to Peru to sign with Deportivo Municipal. In 2000, he played abroad in the United States with amateur side Uruguay Soccer Club. Sponton returned to the professional level in 2001 by signing with the Toronto Lynx in the USL A-League. He made 24 appearances and recorded two goals for Toronto.

In 2002, he played in the Canadian Professional Soccer League with Toronto Supra. In 2007, he played in the Ontario Soccer League with A.C. Soccer Diavoli where he was named the MVP in the South Region West division.
