= Miles O'Connor =

Canadian soccer player

Personal information
- Date of birth: 20 April 1982 (age 44)
- Place of birth: Mississauga, Ontario, Canada
- Height: 5 ft 10 in (1.78 m)
- Position: Midfielder

Team information
- Current team: AAC of Toronto
- Number: 17

Senior career*
Years	Team	Apps	(Gls)
- Italia Shooters
2008	Brampton Lions	22	(2)
2008–2009	RRFC Montegnée		
2009–	AAC of Toronto		

International career
1998–1999	Canada U17	6	(1)
1999–2001	Canada U20	8	(0)
- * Club domestic league appearances and goals

Miles O'Connor (born 20 April 1982) is a Canadian soccer player who plays for AAC of Toronto.

== Club career ==
He previously played for Italia Shooters, Brampton Lions and in Belgium for RRFC Montegnée.

== International career ==
He is a former member of the Canada U-20 men's national soccer team and scored in 6 games, one goal.

== Coaching career ==
O'Connor leads Step Up Soccer Summer Camp in Mississauga, which coached youth talents and the U-18 B of Mississauga SC.

== Personal life ==
His brother Matthew O'Connor also plays soccer.
