= Ante Pavlović =

Croatian footballer

Personal information
- Place of birth: SR Croatia SFR Yugoslavia
- Position: Striker

Senior career*
Years	Team	Apps	(Gls)
2001–2002	Zadar	3	(0)
2004–2005	Toronto Croatia		
- * Club domestic league appearances and goals

Ante Pavlović is a Croatian retired footballer who played in the Croatian First Football League, and Canadian Professional Soccer League.

== Playing career ==
Pavlović played in the Croatian First Football League in 2001 with NK Zadar. In 2004, he went abroad to play in the Canadian Professional Soccer League with Toronto Croatia. In his debut season he won the CPSL Championship after defeating Vaughan Shooters. The following season he assisted in clinching a postseason berth by finishing second in the Eastern Conference.
