= Janer Guaza =

Colombian footballer (born 1991)

Personal information
- Full name: Janer Guaza Lucumi
- Date of birth: November 12, 1991 (age 34)
- Place of birth: Puerto Tejada, Cauca, Colombia
- Position: Midfielder

Senior career*
Years	Team	Apps	(Gls)
2009–2010	Atlético Huila	21	(3)
2011	Cúcuta Deportivo	1	(0)
2012	SC Toronto		
2013–	Club Petrolero	3	(1)
- * Club domestic league appearances and goals

Janer Guaza Lucumí (born November 12, 1991) is a Colombian footballer who currently plays for Club Petrolero in the Liga de Fútbol Profesional Boliviano.

== Playing career ==
Guaza began his career in 2009 with Atlético Huila in the Categoría Primera A, where he would play a total of 21 matches and score three goals. In 2011, he signed with Cúcuta Deportivo appearing in only in one match. On May 2, 2012, SC Toronto of the Canadian Soccer League announced the signing of Guaza for the 2012 season. He made his debut for the club on July 20, 2012, in a match against Mississauga Eagles FC. In 2013, he went abroad to Bolivia to sign with Club Petrolero in the Liga de Fútbol Profesional Boliviano.
