= Saša Milaimović =

Croatian footballer (born 1975)

Personal information
- Full name: Saša Milaimović
- Date of birth: August 27, 1975 (age 51)
- Place of birth: Derventa, SR Croatia, SFR Yugoslavia
- Height: 5 ft 10 in (1.78 m)
- Position: Striker

Senior career*
Years	Team	Apps	(Gls)
1993–1995	Osijek	5	(0)
2000–2001	Pohang Steelers	25	(8)
2002–2003	Győri ETO	1	(0)
2004	Hamilton Thunder	19	(8)

Managerial career
- 2015-2016: Maksimir
- 2021-2022: Devetka
- * Club domestic league appearances and goals as of 8 April 08, 2015

Saša Milaimović (born August 27, 1975) is a Croatian retired footballer who played professionally most notably in Asia, and North America.

== Playing career ==
Milaimović began his career in his native country Croatia in 1993 with NK Osijek in the 1. HNL. In 2000, he went abroad to South Korea to play with Pohang Steelers of the K-League. He played with Győri ETO FC in the Nemzeti Bajnokság I from 2002-2003. Milaimović went to North America in 2004 to sign with the Hamilton Thunder in the Canadian Professional Soccer League. Where he finished as the team's third highest goalscorer with 8 goals, and won the Western Conference title. He featured in the club's postseason semi-final match against the Toronto Croatia, but lost the match to a score of 2-0.

== Managerial career ==
His first managerial spells were at Zagreb's lower league sides Maksimir and Devetka and he was appointed coach at the Saudi Arabian national football academy in April 2022.
