= Stuart Black (soccer) =

Nigerian footballer

Personal information
- Full name: Stuart Black
- Date of birth: 2 June 1975 (age 51)
- Place of birth: Lagos, Nigeria
- Height: 5 ft 11 in (1.80 m)
- Position: Defender

Senior career*
Years	Team	Apps	(Gls)
1996–1997	Toronto Supra		
1999	Toronto Lynx	18	(0)
1999–2001	Detroit Rockers (indoor)	51	(6)
2001–2002	York Region Shooters		
2005	Vaughan Shooters		
- * Club domestic league appearances and goals

Stuart Black (born 2 June 1975) is a Nigerian former footballer who played in the Canadian National Soccer League, USL A-League, and Canadian Professional Soccer League.

== Playing career ==
Black began his career with Toronto Supra of the Canadian National Soccer League in 1996. He helped Supra finish with a third-place finish in the league standings, and secured a playoff position. Their opponents were St. Catharines Wolves in the semi-finals, but were eliminated from the completion with a 2–1 defeat on goals on aggregate. In 1999, he signed with Detroit Rockers of the National Professional Soccer League, where he would have a three-year term and finished with 51 appearances and six goals to his name. In 1999, during the outdoor season he signed with Toronto Lynx of the USL A-League.

In 2001, Black signed with York Region Shooters of the Canadian Professional Soccer League. His next stint in the CPSL was in 2005 when he signed with the Vaughan Shooters. He made his debut for Vaughan on 29 May 2005, in a match against Toronto Croatia. He helped Vaughan secure a division title by finishing first in the Eastern Conference. In the postseason he helped Vaughan reach the CPSL Championship finals, where they faced the Oakville Blue Devils lost to a score of 2–1.
