= Armandinho Manjate =

Brazilian footballer and coach (born 1970)

Personal information
- Full name: Armando Boaventura Manjate
- Date of birth: June 30, 1970 (age 56)
- Place of birth: Lourenço Marques, Portuguese Mozambique
- Position: Defender

Youth career
- Sporting CP

Senior career*
Years	Team	Apps	(Gls)
1985–1987	C.D. Cova da Piedade	16	(0)
1987–1988	S.C. Lusitânia	21	(0)
1988–1989	Amora F.C.		
1989	Toronto Italia		
1990	Toronto First Portuguese		
1994–1995	G.D. Samora Correia		
1996	Toronto Supra		
1997	Toronto Lynx	4	(0)
- * Club domestic league appearances and goals

Armandinho Boaventura Manjate (born June 30, 1970) is a Brazilian former footballer and football manager.

== Football career ==
Manjate began his football career in Portugal at the youth level with Sporting Clube de Portugal. He would have stints with S.C. Olhanense. In 1985, he played in the Portuguese Second Division with C.D. Cova da Piedade. In 1987, he played with S.C. Lusitânia, and later with Amora F.C. In 1989, he played in the National Soccer League with Toronto Italia, and with Toronto First Portuguese the following season.

He returned in 1994 to play in the Portuguese Terceira Divisão with G.D. Samora Correia. In 1996, he signed with Toronto Supra and served as the team captain for the 1996 CNSL season. In 1997, Manjate signed with expansion franchise Toronto Lynx in the USL A-League, and his signing was announced in April 1997.

He also played professionally in El Salvador.

== Managerial career ==
Manjate serves as a technical director for EduKick Brazil Football Academy an affiliate club for Fluminense FC. He has been a youth coach for a variety of teams in the Toronto area, including the Toronto Eagles SC. He was the U15 Boys Assistant Coach for the Ontario Soccer Association, and was affiliated with Guelph Royals as an academy coach.
