= Vince Ursini =

Canadian accountant, soccer executive, and stage actor

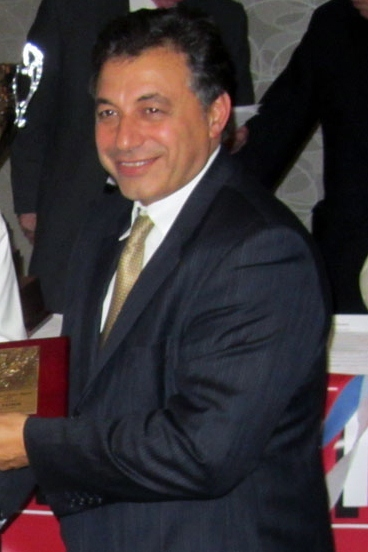
- Ursini in 2011

Chairman/President of Canadian Soccer League
- In office 2011–2016
- Preceded by: Domenic Di Gironimo (as CSL commissioner)
- Succeeded by: Dragan Bakoc

Chairman/President of Canadian Professional Soccer League
- In office 2000–2005
- Preceded by: Michael Di Biase
- Succeeded by: Cary Kaplan (as CSL commissioner)

Personal details
- Born: September 19, 1960 (age 66)
- Education: Ivey Business School of University of Western Ontario
- Occupation: Accountant

Vincent Ursini (born September 19, 1960) is a Canadian accountant, former soccer executive, and stage actor.

Originally a soccer player Ursini drifted to the administrative duties of soccer. Initially serving at the regional association levels he ultimately was elected to the Ontario Soccer Association board of directors. During his tenure with the Ontario Soccer Association, he became involved with the Canadian Professional Soccer League (CPSL). In 2000, he was named the chairman/president of the CPSL and established the league within the Ontario soccer structure. In 2005, he was elected to the Canadian Soccer Association board of directors as the director of finance.

He returned to the CPSL in 2011 under the re-branded name Canadian Soccer League (CSL) under the same capacity of chairman/president. After his resignation from the CSL in 2017 he became involved with the Blackhorse Village Players Theater in Caledon, Ontario as a stage actor.

== Soccer administrator ==
=== Ontario Soccer Association ===
Ursini graduated from Ivey Business School at the University of Western Ontario in 1983 with a bachelor's in business administration. He found employment in financial services as an accountant and consultant. He originally played soccer before transitioning to an administrative capacity in the North York and York Region soccer districts. He played at the college level with the Western Mustangs, where he received the Duncan A. McLarty Award in 1982. He became involved with the Ontario Soccer Association (OSA) as the association's treasurer and served on the executive committee. During his tenure with the OSA, he contributed to the planning and construction of the Ontario Soccer Centre in Vaughan, Ontario. When the Canadian Professional Soccer League was sanctioned by the OSA in 1998 he served in the capacity of a league director, and later as the league's treasurer.

=== Canadian Professional Soccer League ===
In 2000, he was appointed the president/chairman of the CPSL. Throughout his incumbency, he was able to acquire a television deal with Rogers TV, which enabled the launch of the CPSL Soccer Show which garnered the highest ratings of any other Sunday program shown on the channel. Sponsorship agreements were made with Primus Canada, and the Government of Canada. In 2001, the Canadian Soccer Association (CSA) initiated a task force named the Canadian United Soccer League (CUSL), which formed a working partnership with the CPSL and the Canadian franchises in the USL A-League to forge a unified professional structure in the hopes of forming a Canadian first and second division domestic league. A player agreement was conducted with the Toronto Lynx of the USL A-League, which provided the Lynx access to any CPSL talent upon request. Another notable achievement was the opening of their domestic cup the Open Canada Cup in 2003 to all Canadian professional and amateur clubs to provide a potential candidate for the CONCACAF Champions' Cup.

=== Canadian Soccer Association ===
In 2005 at the CPSL Annual General Meeting, he announced his resignation to fully delegate his time to his OSA obligations, and to seek election to the CSA board of directors. In May 2005, he was elected to the CSA executive committee as director of finance. He served as the head of delegation for the Canada men's national soccer team during the 2010 FIFA World Cup qualification (CONCACAF). He was a member of the local organizing committee for the 2007 FIFA U-20 World Cup. In 2009, he was awarded the Aubrey Sanford Meritorious Award and shortly after resigned from the committee. When he returned as chairman of the board to the CSL in 2011 he was granted a seat on the CSA Professional Soccer Committee as it was sanctioned by the CSA.

=== Canadian Soccer League ===
In 2011, he returned to his previous occupation as the chairman of the Canadian Soccer League (CSL) renamed from the CPSL in 2006. The league's membership under Ursini's second administration expanded to a record amount of 28 teams in 2012 with 16 in the First division and 12 in the Second division. Their media coverage was broadened with a television agreement with CogecoTV, and the reintroduction of their weekly television program was picked up by Rogers TV. In 2013, the CSA unexpectedly de-sanctioned the CSL without due process. The decision was made to implement the James Easton Report (Rethink Management Group Report) for the adoption of a new professional soccer structure. As a member in good standing, Ursini represented the CSL in their appeal to the Sport Dispute Resolution Centre of Canada (SDRCC). The sport arbitrator ruled that the CSA had the right to de-sanction the CSL, but ruled that the immediate decisions conducted by the CSA were unreasonable and coercive. The sports arbitrator forced them to reinstate sanctioning to the CSL until the next season for the CSA to fairly implement the Easton Report.

In 2014, CSA expelled the CSL from its membership which forced the league to operate as a private league for the first time since the 1997 season in its predecessor league, and became a member of the Soccer Federation of Canada. Since the CSA de-certification of the CSL, several reforms and achievements were made under Ursini as the restrictions on import players were lifted, and a working relationship was formed with the American Soccer League (ASL). A television agreement was made with Ethnic Channels Group, and beIN Sports to broadcast their television program, and revived their sponsorship deal with Givova in 2016. Affiliations were formed with the Ontario Youth Soccer Association to establish a YSA Division to house the CSL academy teams and with the Canadian Corporate Soccer League in developing a structure of competition for the city's corporate clubs in Toronto.

== Actor ==
Ursini is also involved with the Blackhorse Village Players as a stage actor, where he has appeared in plays such as A Red Plaid Shirt, The Psychic, Office Hours, and The Red Velvet Cake War.
