= Cesar Garcia (curator) =

Mexican-born American scholar, writer, curator, and educator

Cesar Garcia (born 1985) is a Mexican-born American scholar, writer, curator, and educator. He is the founder and current director and chief curator of The Mistake Room, in Los Angeles.

== Early life and education ==
Born in Mexico and raised in the United States from the age of six, Garcia grew up in the Pico-Union neighborhood of Los Angeles. Upon graduating from Bravo Medical Magnet HS in Boyle Heights, Garcia went on to earn a dual bachelor's degree in Political Science and Chicano Studies from UCLA in 2007. Garcia then attended USC's Roski School of Art and Design, where he completed a Master's in Public Art Studies in 2009. His master's thesis, based on extensive field research, mapped the growth of alternative and artist-run spaces along the U.S.-Mexico border during the height of the violent cartel wars.

In 2009, Garcia received a Eugene Cota-Robles Doctoral Fellowship from UCLA's Department of World Arts and Cultures/Dance.

== Career and exhibitions ==
Since 2012, Garcia has been the Founding Director and Chief Curator of The Mistake Room—LA's only independent, non-profit cultural institution solely devoted to an international program of art and ideas. From 2007 to 2012, Garcia served as the associate director and Senior Curator at LAXART, Los Angeles. In 2008, Garcia served on the curatorial team of the 2008 California Biennial at the Orange County Museum of Art (curated by Lauri Firstenberg, PhD) and in 2012 he was one of the curators of Made in L.A. 2012, the first Los Angeles Biennial organized by the Hammer Museum and LAXART. Garcia was the U.S. Commissioner of the 13th International Cairo Biennial, and in 2013 served on the curatorial research committee of the 55th International Venice Biennale curated by Massimiliano Gioni.

Garcia's notable exhibitions and projects include Joel Kyack's freeway puppet theater Superclogger (2010); Marcos Ramirez' ERRE's retrospective exhibition at the Museo de Arte Carrillo Gil, Mexico City (co-curated with Kevin Power); a re-staging of Mark di Suvero's Artists Tower of Protest for the Getty Foundation's Pacific Standard Time Performance and Public Art Festival (2012); the U.S. museum premiere of Egyptian artist Wael Shawky's Cabaret Crusades at the Hammer Museum (2013); and Eduardo Sarabia's mid-career survey at the Instituto Cultural Cabañas in Guadalajara, Mexico (2014), amongst others.

At The Mistake Room, Garcia has organized the first U.S. institutional solo show of Colombia-born, UK-based artist Oscar Murillo (2014); the first Los Angeles solo show of Thailand-born, NY-based artist Korakrit Arunanondchai (2014); a survey of artist Gordon Matta-Clark's films (2014); a focused historical exhibition devoted to the work of American abstract expressionist painter Ed Clark (2015); and the first U.S. solo show of Argentina-born, Guatemala-based artist Vivian Suter (2015).
