= Cary Kaplan =

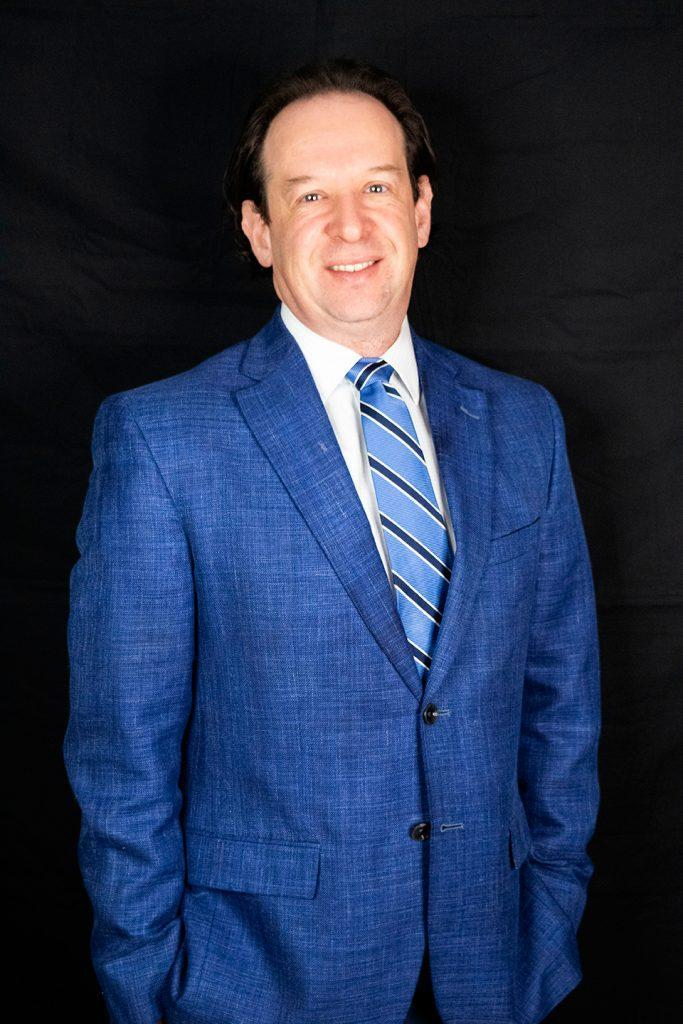
- In office 2013–Current

Personal details
- Born: 1969 (age 56–57) Canada
- Education: University of Toronto & Dalhousie University

Cary Kaplan is the president and co-owner of the sports marketing firm Cosmos Sports & Entertainment with his wife Amelia Kaplan, which launched in 2003. The company specializes in consulting for sports teams and leagues in sales, marketing and business operations. High-profile clients have included the NHL CFL, MLS, the Chicago Cubs the Houston Rockets and Cirque du Soleil.

== Biography ==
In 1995, Kaplans's marketing firm Sports Marketing Results had an affiliation with the Canadian National Soccer League. Kaplan then worked for the Edmonton Oilers hockey team for six years, the last two as the president and alternate governor of the Oilers top affiliate, the Hamilton Bulldogs, of the American Hockey League (AHL). In 1999, he won the Ken McKenzie Award as the AHL's top marketing executive. In Hamilton, he was credited with keeping the team in Hamilton when he organized the 'Stay Dogs Stay' campaign in 2000, resulting in increased attendance and tickets sold. He also initiated the process that brought the Montreal Canadiens to take over the Bulldogs franchise and AHL team in the city when the Oilers withdrew following the 2002–03 season.

Kaplan has been owner and president of the sports marketing firm, Cosmos Sports & Entertainment since August 2003 when he and his wife Amelia opened the business.

From 2005 until October 2009, he served as the commissioner and chairman of Canada's only professional soccer league, the Canadian Soccer League. During his tenure, the league gained affiliations with Canada's governing body, the Canadian Soccer Association, as well as with Canada's top two professional teams Toronto FC and the Montreal Impact, the establishment of a television contract with Rogers TV, and reserve divisions for the league.

In 2013, Kaplan assumed the role of the president of the new Brampton Beast hockey team in the Central Hockey League (CHL). Kaplan was a minority owner that helped bring the first Canadian franchise in the CHL. The seven remaining CHL teams joined the ECHL prior to the 2014–15 season. The Beast were affiliated with the Montreal Canadiens and Ottawa Senators during their tenure. The Beast, who qualified for the playoffs in 3 of their final 4 seasons, folded in February 2021 after not being able to play since March 2020 during the COVID-19 pandemic.

In 2019, Kaplan further added the role of being Chief Revenue Officer (CRO) of Global T20 Canada, managing all revenue for the largest cricket event in Canadian history.

Sporting positions
Preceded by Scott Howson	Hamilton Bulldogs President; 2000–2002	Succeeded by Steve Katzman
Preceded by Vincent Ursini	Canadian Soccer League Commissioner; 2005–2009	Succeeded by Domenic De Geronimo
Preceded by None	Brampton Beast President & General Manager; 2013-2020	Succeeded by None
