= 2010 York Region Shooters season =

York Region Shooters
2010 season
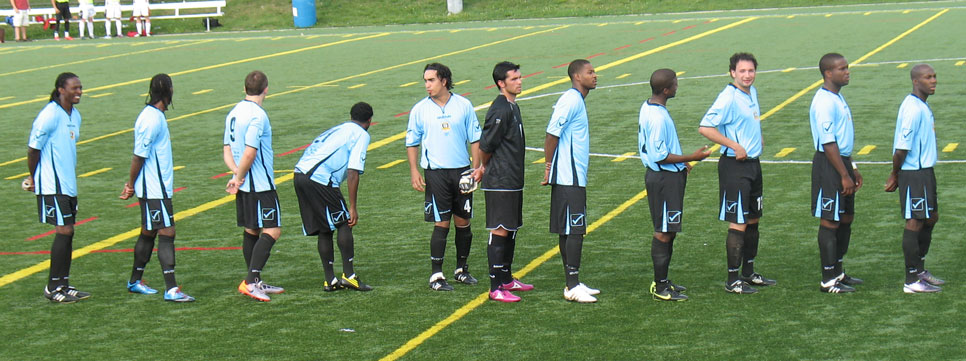
- York Region Shooters line-up before the match against Brantford Galaxy at St. Joan Of Arc Turf Field, August 1, 2010
- Chairman: Tony De Thomasis
- Manager: Filipe Bento
- Canadian Soccer League: 1st place (First Division)
- CSL Championship: Quarterfinal
- Top goalscorer: Kadian Lecky (12)
Home colours	Away colours

The 2010 CSL season was the 13th season in York Region Shooters participation in the Canadian Soccer League. The club ended their CSL campaign by claiming their third division title by finishing first in the First Division. In the postseason York Region faced an early departure after a defeat to Toronto Croatia in the preliminary round.

As the CSL was granted full membership in the Canadian Soccer Association as a Division III sanctioned professional league the league board of directors merged both the International and National divisions to form the First Division. As a result the Shooters were renamed into the York Region Shooters to reflect the franchises presence in the York Region territory. Throughout the season the club maintain a solid performance finishing the year with the third best offensive record. Kadian Lecky was Vaughan's top goalscorer for the fifth consecutive time with 12 goals. While their reserve team finished fourth in the Reserve Division with a playoff berth.

== Summary ==
In 2010, the CSL was transferred under the auspices of the Canadian Soccer Association, and was granted full membership. The league's administration restructured the league by combining both divisions to form the CSL First Division. As a result of the changes the club changed its name to York Region Shooters, reflecting the previous merger in 2003 and the larger area of York Region the club has played in and represents.

Former player Filipe Bento took over the reign of head coach and clinched the club's third regular season championship by finishing first in the standings. Their postseason journey came to an abrupt end after losing 3–1 on goals on aggregate to Toronto Croatia. At the conclusion of the season De Thomasis received the Harry Paul Gauss award, while Rick Titus was awarded the CSL Defender of the Year award.

== Club ==
=== Management ===
Position	Staff
Head coach	Filipe Bento
Assistant coach	Tony De Thomasis
Manager	John Pacione

Last updated: February 28, 2011

== Squad ==
As of October 11, 2010.

Note: Flags indicate national team as defined under FIFA eligibility rules; some limited exceptions apply. Players may hold more than one non-FIFA nationality.

No.	Pos.	Nation	Player
1	GK	CHI	Camilo Benzi
2	DF	TTO	Rick Titus
4	DF	CAN	Marcelo Capazolo
6	DF	CAN	Fitzroy Christie
7	DF	CAN	Desmond Humphrey
8	DF		Nick Cisternino
9	FW	CAN	Jason De Thomasis
10	FW	CAN	Kadian Lecky
12	FW	TTO	Jonathan Westmaas
14	MF		Nico Martinez
13	MF	CAN	Matthew O'Connor
17	MF		Mario Orestano

No.	Pos.	Nation	Player
22	FW		Geron Duporte
23	MF		Aundrae Rollins
25	MF	CAN	Stalin Cardenas
–	DF		Fabrizio Castiglione
–	DF		Courtney Dennis
–	MF	CAN	Ryan Dummett
–	MF	CAN	Julio Garcia
–	MF	SKN	Darryl Gomez
–	MF	CAN	Cameron Medwin
–	DF	CAN	Vince Petrasso
–	FW		Luke Stedmond
–	MF	CAN	Alex Trujillo

=== In ===
No.	Pos.	Player	Transferred from	Fee/notes	Source
13	MF	(Canada) Matthew O'Connor	(Hungary) Integrál-DAC	Free Transfer	
	DF	(Canada) Vince Petrasso	(United States) Harrisburg City Islanders	Free Transfer	

=== Out ===
No.	Pos.	Player	Transferred to	Fee/notes	Source
6	MF	(United States) Blake Ordell	(United States) Illinois Piasa	Free Transfer	
	MF	(United States) Dominic Scicluna	(United States) Detroit Waza Flo	Free Transfer	
20	MF	(Canada) Jordan Webb	(Singapore) Hougang United	Free Transfer	

== Competitions summary ==
=== First division ===
Pos	Team	Pld	W	D	L	GF	GA	GD	Pts	Qualification
1	York Region Shooters (A, C)	24	13	7	4	45	29	+16	46	Qualified for the Givova CSL Cup play-offs
2	Serbian White Eagles (A)	24	12	9	3	40	16	+24	45	Qualified for the Givova CSL Cup play-offs
3	Hamilton Croatia (A)	24	13	5	6	51	27	+24	44	Qualified for the Givova CSL Cup play-offs
4	Milltown FC (A)	24	12	7	5	43	22	+21	43	Qualified for the Givova CSL Cup play-offs
5	Portugal FC (A)	24	11	5	8	46	39	+7	38	Qualified for the Givova CSL Cup play-offs

Updated to match(es) played on October 13, 2010. Source: rocketrobinsoccerintoronto.com
Rules for classification: 1) points; 2) goal difference; 3) number of goals scored.
(A) Advance to a further round; (C) Champions

==== Results summary ====
Overall								Home						Away					
Pld	W	D	L	GF	GA	GD	Pts	W	D	L	GF	GA	GD	W	D	L	GF	GA	GD
24	13	7	4	45	29	+16	46	7	4	1	24	10	+14	6	3	3	21	19	+2

Last updated: October 8, 2010.
Source: 2010 Canadian Soccer League season

==== Results by round ====
Round	1	2	3	4	5	6	7	8	9	10	11	12	13	14	15	16	17	18	19	20	21	22	23	24
Ground	H	H	A	H	A	H	A	H	A	A	A	A	H	H	H	H	A	H	H	H	A	A	A	A
Result	W	W	D	W	L	W	L	W	W	L	W	D	D	W	D	D	W	D	L	W	W	W	W	D

Source: Regular season matches
A = Away; H = Home; W = Win; D = Draw; L = Loss

==== Matches ====
May 16, 2010	York Region Shooters	1–0	St. Catharines Wolves	Vaughan, Ontario
18:00	Kadian Lecky 67'	Report		Stadium: St. Joan Of Arc Turf Field

May 23, 2010	York Region Shooters	3–0	London City SC	Vaughan, Ontario
18:00	Geron Duport 2'; Aundrae Rollins 76'; Jason De Thomasis 83'	Report		Stadium: St. Joan Of Arc Turf Field

May 28, 2010	Hamilton Croatia	1–1	York Region Shooters	Hamilton, Ontario
21:00	Dodds 70'	Report	Courtney Dennis 90'	Stadium: Brian Timmis Stadium

May 30, 2010	York Region Shooters	1–0	TFC Academy	Vaughan, Ontario
18:00	Kadian Lecky 6'	Report		Stadium: St. Joan Of Arc Turf Field

June 4, 2010	Serbian White Eagles	3–0	York Region Shooters	Toronto, Ontario
20:00	Milos Scepanovic 6', 17'; Shawn Brown 16'	Report		Stadium: Centennial Park Stadium; Attendance: 200; Referee: David Barrie (OSA)

June 6, 2010	York Region Shooters	2–0	Portugal FC	Vaughan, Ontario
18:00	Kadian Lecky 5'; Mario Orestano 59'	Report		Stadium: St. Joan Of Arc Turf Field

June 13, 2010	Brantford Galaxy	5–2	York Region Shooters	Brantford, Ontario
19:00	Golijanin 11'; Drazen Vukovic 17', 45'; Anđelković 36'; Marsalis Beckford 64'	Report	Jason De Thomasis 63'; Desmond Humphrey 90'	Stadium: Steve Brown Sports Complex

June 20, 2010	York Region Shooters	3–0	Hamilton Croatia	Vaughan, Ontario
18:00	Kadian Lecky 36', 91'; Zeko Iron 84'	Report		Stadium: St. Joan Of Arc Turf Field

June 26, 2010	Montreal Impact Academy	0–1	York Region Shooters	Montreal, Quebec
13:00		Report		Stadium: Saputo Stadium

July 2, 2010	Milltown F.C.	2–1	York Region Shooters	Milton, Ontario
20:00	Cordell Benjamin 60', 65'	Report	Kadian Lecky 36'	Stadium: Bishop Reding SS

July 7, 2010	St. Catharines Wolves	0–2	York Region Shooters	St. Catharines, Ontario
20:00		Report	Gomez 42'; Ryan Dummett 70'	Stadium: Club Roma Stadium

July 16, 2010	London City SC	2–2	York Region Shooters	London, Ontario
20:38	Michael Marcoccia 22'; Thomas Beattie 86'	Report	Andrae Rollins 15'; Kadian Lecky 56'	Stadium: Cove Road Stadium; Referee: Justin Tasev (OSA)

July 25, 2010	York Region Shooters	1–1	Toronto Croatia	Vaughan, Ontario
18:00	Desmond Humphrey	Report	Fitzwilliams 78'	Stadium: St. Joan Of Arc Turf Field

August 1, 2010	York Region Shooters	4–1	Brantford Galaxy	Vaughan, Ontario
18:00	Jason De Thomasis 24'; Kadian Lecky 71', 76'; Nick Cisternino 91'	Report	Marsalis Beckford 23'	Stadium: St. Joan Of Arc Turf Field; Attendance: 125; Referee: Mike Izzo (OSA)

August 8, 2010	York Region Shooters	1–1	Milltown F.C.	Vaughan, Ontario
18:00	Aundre Rollins 93'	Report	Cordell Benjamin 63'	Stadium: St. Joan Of Arc Turf Field; Attendance: 125; Referee: Manuel Orellano (OSA)

August 15, 2010	York Region Shooters	1–1	Serbian White Eagles	Vaughan, Ontario
18:00	Jason De Thomasis 47'	Report	Vukovic 23'	Stadium: St. Joan Of Arc Turf Field; Attendance: 300; Referee: Manuel Orellano (OSA)

September 3, 2010	Portugal FC	2–3	York Region Shooters	Toronto, Ontario
20:00	Adrian Pena 45'; Badat 68'	Report	Alex Trujillo 54'; Kadian Lecky 61'; Medwin 84'	Stadium: Lamport Stadium; Attendance: 50; Referee: Justin Tasev (OSA)

September 5, 2010	York Region Shooters	1–1	North York Astros	Vaughan, Ontario
18:00	Jason De Thomasis 66'	Report	Nikola Miodrag 92'	Stadium: St. Joan Of Arc Turf Field; Attendance: 60; Referee: Manuel Orellano (OSA)

September 12, 2010	York Region Shooters	2–3	Brampton Lions	Vaughan, Ontario
18:00	Luke Stedmond 4'; Julio Garcia 86'	Report	Nick Cisterrnino 7' (o.g.); Oswald Adu 60'; Hernandez 84'	Stadium: St. Joan Of Arc Turf Field; Attendance: 90; Referee: Justin Tasev (OSA)

September 18, 2010	York Region Shooters	4–2	Montreal Impact Academy	Vaughan, Ontario
17:00	Alex Trujillo 45'; Luke Stedmond 79', 81'; Gomez 85'	Report	Ilcu 66', 69'	Stadium: St. Joan Of Arc Turf Field; Attendance: 80; Referee: Manuel Orellano (OSA)

September 25, 2010	North York Astros	2–4	York Region Shooters	Toronto, Ontario
15:45	Roozbeh Houdaji 52'; Rick Titus 62' (o.g.)	Report	Kadian Lecky 2'; Alex Trujillo 45'; Ryan Dummett 82'; Gomez	Stadium: Esther Shiner Stadium; Referee: Richard Oliveira (OSA)

October 1, 2010	Brampton Lions	0–2	York Region Shooters	Brampton, Ontario
20:00		Report	Mario Orestano 50'; Desmond Humphrey 57'	Stadium: Victoria Park Stadium

October 3, 2010	TFC Academy	0–1	York Region Shooters	Toronto, Ontario
14:00		Report	Alex Trujillo 21'	Stadium: Lamport Stadium; Attendance: 80; Referee: Hassane Rifai (OSA)

October 8, 2010	Toronto Croatia	2–2	York Region Shooters	Toronto, Ontario
20:00	Sven Arapovic 55'; Niko Pesa 84'	Report	Desmond Humphrey 27'; Alex Trujillo 43'	Stadium: Centennial Park Stadium; Attendance: 120; Referee: Alain Ruch (OSA)

==== Postseason ====
October 12, 2010 Quarterfinal	Toronto Croatia	2–0	York Region Shooters	Toronto, Ontario
20:00	Zgela 63'; Tihomir Maletic 88'	Report		Stadium: Centennial Park Stadium; Attendance: 120; Referee: David Barrie (OSA)

October 17, 2010 Quarterfinal	York Region Shooters	1–1	Toronto Croatia	Vaughan, Ontario
18:00	Jason De Thomasis 28'	Report	Tihomir Maletic 55'	Stadium: St. Joan Of Arc Turf Field

== Statistics ==
=== Goals ===
Correct as of October 8, 2010

Goals
Pos.	Playing Pos.	Nation	Name	Goals
1	FW	(Canada)	Kadian Lecky	12
2	FW	(Canada)	Jason De Thomasis	5
2	MF	(Canada)	Alex Trujillo	5
3	DF	(Canada)	Desmond Humphrey	4
4	MF	(Saint Kitts and Nevis)	Darryl Gomez	3
4	MF		Aundrae Rollins	3
4	FW		Luke Stedmond	3
5	MF	(Canada)	Ryan Dummett	2
5	MF		Mario Orestano	2
6	DF		Nick Cisternino	1
6	DF		Courtney Dennis	1
6	FW		Geron Duporte	1
6	MF	(Canada)	Julio Garcia	1
6	MF		Zeko Iron	1
6	MF	(Canada)	Cameron Medwin	1
Total				45
