= GFK Dubočica =

Dubočica
- Full name: Gradski Fudbalski Klub Dubočica
- Nicknames: Leskovčani (Leskovites); Paprikari (Paprika Growers); Dubiš
- Founded: 20 August 1923; 103 years ago, as Radnički sportski klub Crvena zastava 2015; 11 years ago, as Gradski fudbalski klub Dubočica
- Ground: Dubočica Stadium
- Capacity: 8,136
- Owner(s): Millennium Team (70%); City of Leskovac (30%)
- President: Ivan Bošnjak
- Head coach: Albert Nađ
- League: Serbian First League
- 2024–25: Serbian First League, 11th of 16
- Website: gfkdubocica.rs
Home colours	Away colours

Gradski fudbalski klub Dubočica (Serbian Cyrillic: Градски фудбалски клуб Дубочица), commonly known as Dubočica, is a Serbian football club based in the southern city of Leskovac, which competes in the second division Serbian First League. The club's name derives from a traditional synonym for Leskovac and the surrounding region.

== History ==
=== Early years (1923–1944) ===
On May Day, 1924 the trade unionist and revolutionary Kosta Stamenković initiated the establishment of a football physical-cultural society in Leskovac, Serbia, then part of the Kingdom of Serbs, Croats and Slovenes (later renamed Yugoslavia). The club's explicit aim was the propagation of Marxists-Leninist ideology amongst the working-class youth of Leskovac, and to serve as a front for assembling members of the underground Communist Party of Yugoslavia. Radnički sportski klub Crvena zastava (English: Workers Sporting Club Red Flag) was co-founded by Kosta Stamenković, first club president Jovan Živković, and ten other trade unionists during an annual meeting on 20 August 1923.

The new club came under immediate suspicion by the authorities who refused to register the association due to its overtly political name and membership, nonetheless RSK Red Flag continued playing unofficial matches, the first-ever being a 3–2 win over Jug Bogdan from Prokupje in August 1923. Red Flag changed its name the following year to Radnički sportski klub Proleter (English: Workers Sporting Club Proletarian), but continued having issues with the authorities and failed to have its registration approved.

On 18 January 1925, RSK Proleter officially changed its name to Leskovački radnički sportski klub Sloboda (English: Leskovac Sporting Club Liberty), this time the club's registration was excepted by the Belgrade Football Subassociation, and the club was allowed to compete in the Morava District League for season 1925–26 under instructions that further political activism would lead to its suspension. On 28 March 1925 the club played its first officially recognized match, losing 4–1 to visiting Radnički Kragujevac.

Following the 6 January dictatorship of King Alexander I, LRSK Sloboda decided to alter its name midway through season 1928–29 to Građanski sport klub Sloboda (English: Citizens Sport Club Liberty), that same season Sloboda celebrated its first title finishing top of the Morava District. After only three months GSK Sloboda underwent yet another name change, this time to Leskovački sport klub Građanski (English: Leskovac Sport Club Citizens), after being accused of speeding "Communist propaganda" by fellow rivals GSK Momčilo.

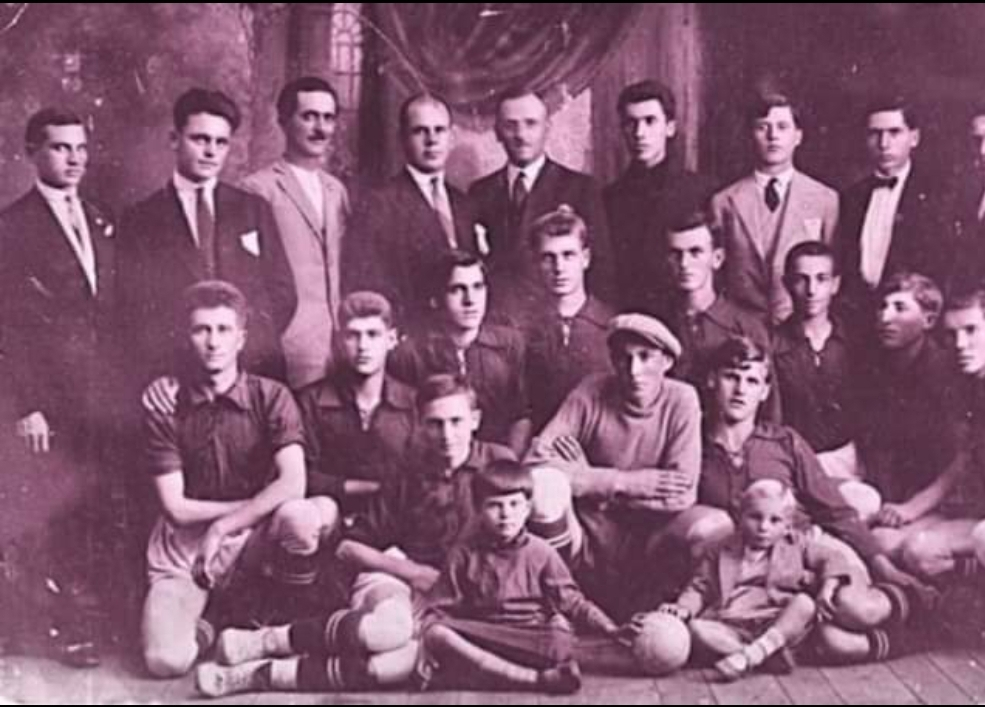
LSK Građanski, Leskovac 1929. From left to right; First row: Administration. Second row: Stojadin Cakić, Dušan Kostić, Dimitrije Stojiljković, Jordan Jović, Dragoljub Kostić, Jovan Dimitrijević, Dragoljub Denčić, Aleksandar Stojiljković, Božidar Ilić, Nikola Spasić and Svetislav Savić.

Građanski were sitting first midway season 1931–32 in the newly established Leskovac District League when the club was accused by rivals OSK Josif, and Momčilo of clandestine revolutionary activity and hooliganism. Due to these accusations, Građanski was suppressed by the authorities. Following failed attempts at registration Kosta Stamenković approached Dimitrije Nikolić, president of the newly renamed Romani club, Leskovački sportski klub Dubočica (previously SK Veternica), to forge a mutually beneficial merger. A general meeting was held between the two club's on 10 March 1932 with Nikolić agreeing to the proposition, believing the inclusion of the defunct Građanski would strengthen Dubočica, however strong opposition to the merger was aired from Romani members who were against any merger, refusing to play alongside "dissidents" and mix with "white's". A compromised proposal of fielding segregated team's was rejected with the Romani boycotting the meeting and later forming the football club "Gajret".

The latter interwar period was a successful one as the Crveni were crowned Leskovac District League champions in season's 1935–36, 1937–38, and 1938–39. On-field triumphs were marred by internal disagreement following the merger of town rivals Fabrički klub Jugoslavija with Dubočica on 15 June 1939. The internal dispute led to the ousting of Dimitrije Nikolić and the election of Kosta Stamenković as new club president.

On 11 April 1941 Leskovac was occupied by the German Army. As active Communists, the club's leadership including Kosta Stamenković, Vlada Đorđević and Stanimir Veljković went underground, whilst many club members and sympathisers were arrested, others joining the Partisan resistance. Dubočica had diminished during the occupation but continued competing, even winning the impeded 1940–41 district league. In October 1941 the team playing a secret friendly match between Grafičar for the purpose of raising funds for the local Partisan Detachment.

On 26 March 1942 tragedy struck Dubočica as club president Stamenković committed suicide during a gunfight with Chetniks who had surrounded him in the village of Šilovo. Dubočica's 1943–44 District League title was further overshadowed by the arrest of club members on suspicious illegal activities and by August 1944 most remaining players had joined the resistance.

=== Ups and downs (1944–1968) ===
Dubočica became the foremost football team in Leskovac following the city's liberation on 11 October 1944. Many rival club's were suppressed, whilst Dubočica was allowed to function due to its ties with the new regime. In 1945 the club changed its name to Radnički sport klub Kosta Stamenković (English: Worker's Sport Club Kosta Stamenković), in honour of the fallen club co-founder and president.

RSK Kosta Stamenković won the 1946 district league twice, the first a slapdash tournament featuring only two other clubs, whilst the second featured six. The club entered the regional Serbian Championship (Group III) for season 1946–47 and incorporated fellow city rivals Omladinac into its ranks. 1947 witnessed the club's Yugoslav Cup debut, being eventually eliminated away by rivals Radnički Niš in an epic 7–5 encounter. RSK Kosta Stamenković won the 1948–49 Serbian Championship (Zone V), but we're unsuccessful in qualifying for the Serbian League for the second year running, after losing 1–0 in neutral Kruševac in a match deciding the previous 3–3 aggregate playoff against Radnički Kragujevac. Due to the proclamation of Kosta Stamenković as a National Hero of Yugoslavia on 14 December 1949, a decision was made by the club to revert to its previous name of Dubočica.

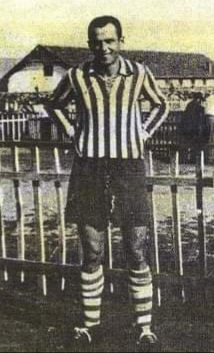
Svetozar "Zare" Trajković. The inspiration behind the popular Leskovac proverb – "Ne se znaje, Zare igra!".

Dubočica qualified for the Serbian Football League in 1950 after a two leg play-off against Jedinstvo, winning 7–0 on aggregate. Celebrations were short-lived with the team finishing 13th with only 9 points, culminating in Dubočica's relegation to the Niš Football Subasociation. In 1952 Dubočica centre forward Zare Trajković achieved legendary status when he scoring 4 goals after half time against FK Vlasina, who had been up 3–0. This memorable comeback inspired the popular proverb in the Leskovac dialect "Ne se znaje, Zare igra!" (lit.It's not known, Zare's playing!"). The idiom means never-say-never or anything is possible.

In 1953 Dubočica won the Leskovac Cup and had a memorable 3–2 win over then Yugoslav First League champions Red Star Belgrade in a club friendly. Dubočica reveled in its 5–1 derby win against Radnički Niš when the two sides met during the 1954 Yugoslav Cup, but ultimately lost again in the preliminary round to Kosovo. Dubočica won back-to-back Niš Football Subasociation titles in 1954–55 and 1955–56 thereby gaining promotion to the Yugoslav Second League (Zone IV). 1956 also witnessed the mergers of LSK (formerly Tekstilac) with Dubočica for the purpose of strengthening the squad for the upcoming season.

With only four matches till season's end Dubočica were found guilty of match fixing in the 1957–58 Yugoslav Second Division (Zone IV), following an 8–0 drubbing of Sloga Skopje. As a result, the club was fined and relegated to the Niš Football Zone. A fitting testimonial match was held in 1959 to honour then captain Svetislav Jovanović, and Borivoje Golubović who both marked 10 years with the team. That year also witnessed the retirement of club legend Stanko Filipović who debuted as a fifteen-year-old in 1935, and had captained Dubočica since 1939.

Dubočica were 1959–60 Niš Football Zone champions, but failed to gain promotion to the second division after a surprise 8–3 aggregate defeat over two legs to Rudar. Dubočica managed to reach the Serbian finals in 1960 but lost 5–0 to Sloga Kraljevo, and again in 1962 losing 3–1 to Borac Čačak thereby falling out of the Yugoslav Cup preliminary round. Dubočica greatly benefited from a competition restructure for the 1962–63 season, as the club was placed in the Serbian League (Group South), where it competed amongst teams from Central Serbia and Kosovo. Dubočica finished a respectable third in its first two seasons, but the club became plagued by a revolving door of coaches, slumping to a 12th-place finish in 1964–65 which culminating in a player exodus from the club. The crisis continued in 1965–66 after a horrible season in which Dubočica finished 14th and suffered relegation. Dubočica fought its way back winning the 1966–67 Niš Football Zone, successfully returning to the Serbian Football League (Group South), with a fifth-place finish in 1967–68. The team qualified for the 1967 Yugoslav Cup after a five-year absence, but were eliminated in the preliminaries by Železničar Niš 3–2.

=== The pride of Leskovac (1968–1983) ===
The Football Association of Yugoslavia undertook a restructure of the league system for the 1968–69 season that enabled Dubočica's debut in the Yugoslav Second League. With Miloš Milutinović at the helm the Leskovčani finishing in 7th place, and replicated the same league table position the following year.

Dubočica triumphed in the Niš-Leskovac derby beating rivals Radnički in the 1970 Serbian FA Cup Final, winning 3–0 away at Čair Stadium and advancing to the round of sixteen of the 1971 Yugoslav Cup, but we're eventually eliminated after losing 1–0 away to Sloboda Tuzla. Despite some solid performances in the league, the team could only managed a disappointing 10th-place finish on the table at season's end.

The challenging times continued for the club after a poor start to its campaign amid coach Milutinović's resignation midseason 1971–72, which lead to Dubočica's relegation from the second tire after a disastrous 17th-place finish. Though the club was in the midst of a rebuilding phase, Dubočica were adamantly vying for a chance to regain promotion to the second tire. The team won the 1972–73 Serbian Football League (Group South) in their first season following relegation, but lost in the two leg playoff to (Group North) champions FK Rad. Dubočica competed in the revamped third tier First Serbian League in season 1973–74, fishing second and back-to-back champions in 1975 and 1976, thereby earning promotion via playoff back into the Yugoslav Second League after a four-year absence.

Upon returning to the second tire the team scarcely survived a challenging campaign finishing in 14th place. Under the management of former player Ljubiša Stefanović, Dubočica achieved its best result, finishing the 1977–78 league session in 4th place. In a campaign marked by outstanding performances, and passionate local support, the team narrowly missing out on promotion to the First Division. The Crveni were unable to match their successful run the following season, and ended 9th on the table. In both 1980 and 1981 the team hovered in 11th spot, whilst a downturn in fortune lead Dubočica to a 13th placing on the Second League ladder.

The 1970s and early 1980s era was defined by club legends such as forward Božidar Stefanović, midfielder and playmaker Ivan Bošković, alongside steadfast defenders Zoran Banković and Stojan Gavrilović. The years spent in the Yugoslav Second League are regarded as the club's most successful era to date until Dubočica suffered relegated at the end of the 1982–83 season. One of the highlights included Dubočica reaching the Round of 16 of the 1983–84 Yugoslav Cup, in which it narrowly lost 1–0 to giants Red Star Belgrade.

=== Fading fortunes (1983–2014) ===
Dubočica competed in the First Serbian League for five seasons (1983–1988) until the establishment of the Inter-Republic League (East), where they finishing season 1988–89 in 4th spot.

After nine years playing third division football Dubočica were promoted to the restructured Second League of FR Yugoslavia in 1992, due to the ensuing civil war. Despite being relegated in season 1994–95, Dubočica returned to the second tire in 1996, but after a dismal season were relegated yet again. The inconsistencies continued as the club made another Second League comeback in season 1999–2000 until once again suffering relegation to the third tier Serbian League East after finishing bottom of the league in the 2002–03 season.

Dubočica meet old rivals Radnički Niš during the 18th round of the 2010–11 Serbian League East. The match was marred by an all-out brawl between ultras in the stands that spilled onto the field of the Leskovac City Stadium. Radnički went on to win the southern derby 2–1. Dubočica unfortunately finishing the session in 14th place and was relegated to the fourth division Niš Zone.

Playing under the new name Dubočica 1923, the team managed a second-place finish in the Niš Zone League and returned to the third division after finishing in a respectable 6th. In August 2013 the Leskovac City Assembly decided to indefinitely withhold financial grants allocated to Dubočica, and revoke the club's ownership of its facilities due to indelible mismanagement. The motion also moved to transfer the team licence to FK Moravac Orion. Dubočica president Saša Pešić who was a city councillor and former chief of staff in the previous DS-lead government insisted that Dubočica and Orion would function independently, but accused the new SNS dominated council of attempting to oust him, and dissolve the club. The following month Pešić succumbed to political pressure and formally resigned as club president. The chaos at the club culminated in a players strike who boycotted training and games, and did not return to normal duties until Bojan Mihajlović was selected by the players group as Head coach due to an absence of any officials. The disarray at the club would prove disastrous as the Leskovčani finishing dead last in the 2013–14 Serbian League East.

=== Turmoil and revival (2014–present) ===
In August 2014 Dubočica's entire senior men's team left the club who forfeited their first two fixtures of the 2014–15 Zone League South. Lacking competent club officials and bankrupt, Dubočica effectively ceased to exist at the senior men's level. Within a year of the crisis a new club administration headed by President Dejan Đorđević, and coach Miroslav Grujić began the rehabilitation process by officially rebranding the club as Gradski fudbalski klub Dubočica (English: City Football Club Dubočica) or GFK Dubočica for short.

The club struggled to consolidate its debts and by February 2016 Grujić resigned sighting six months of unpaid wages, and was replaced by Siniša Stančić. Despite the ongoing challenges, Dubočica managed to win the lowly fifth tier Jablanica District League for season 2015–16, thereby gaining promotion. In early 2018 a payment of approximately €30,000 was issued to the club for stadium upkeep by the municipal council. Following the payment, Leskovac Mayor Dr. Goran Cvetanović accused local sporting associations of corruption, and threatened Dubočica with funding cuts unless drastic changes were taken. Cvetanović also called for a merger between Dubočica, Sloga and Orion and that the construction of a new stadium will not commenced until a higher league ranking is achieved. In March 2018 Goran Đorđević replaced Milun Pejić as manager, a move which guided the club to the Zone League South championship after two seasons, and the attainment of promotion to the third tier Serbian League East in 2018–19.

In February 2019 Leskovac businessman and bus company Kanis owner, Dejan Savić was elected President of Dubočica, replacing Dušan Milutinović. Savić's personal financial contribution via major sponsorship through Kanis has greatly attributed to the fiscal stabilisation of Dubočica. In September 2019 President of Serbia Aleksandar Vučić announced the planned redevelopment of Dubočica's dilapidated stadium as part of a regional assistance program for the city of Leskovac. The new stadium would be built according to UEFA standards with a minimum capacity of 8,000, with scheduled completion by 2021.

Dubočica's aspirations of securing promotion to the Serbian First League were hindered after a poor start to the 2019–20 season, with coach Milan Đorđević resigning after securing just 9 points in 9 rounds. Đorđević was subsequently replaced by former Dubočica player and coach Dragan Stanković "Šimi". The Football Association of Serbia made the decision to suspend the league in round 17 due to the COVID-19 pandemic. During the interruption Aleksandar Kuzmanović was announced as new coach, whilst the FA announced Dubočica's promotion to the second tire Serbian First League for season 2020–21. Kuzmanović resigned after failing to secure a win for the newly promoted side. He was replaced by Saša Mrkić in September 2020. The club's lackluster performance continued throughout the season with Mrkić resigning following a 1–0 home defeat to Radnički Sremska Mitrovica in Round 31. Dubočica were relegated alongside 8 other clubs despite ending the season in 12th place. Dubočica hired new coach Slaviša Božičić as it set about its Serbian League East 2021-22 campaign. In March 2021 Dubočica Stadium was demolished while construction of a modern 8,136 capacity stadium valued at €20,470,000 commenced in the summer. Despite leading the club to the Serbian Cub round of 16 in which Dubočica lost 1–0 to Serbian SuperLiga leaders FK Partizan, Božičić and the club parted ways during the winter break as the team was sitting in 6th place and 14 points behind league leaders Trayal Kruševac. Božičić was replaced by former Dubočica and Yugoslavia national team player Marko Perović. Dubočica were unable to improve and parted way's with Petrović at season's end. Dejan Čelar was hired as the new manager to lead the team for season 2022–23.

The introduction of Čelar revitalised the club as Dubočica showed on-field improvements, losing only three games all season. Led by veteran striker and captain Dušan Savić the team topped the league table, edging out local rivals Radnički Pirot for promotion back to the Serbian First League. Dejan Savić was re-elected club president in January 2023 for another four-year term. The club's reentry into the second division coincided with the highly anticipated opening of the new Dubočica Stadium. The club won its first PrvaLiga home fixture with a 2–1 win against RFK Novi Sad. Several days later the club hosted a large delegation to formally celebrate the opening of the new stadium. The attendees included Serbian president Aleksandar Vučić, Republika Srpska President Milorad Dodik, Leskovac Mayor Goran Cvetanović, Serbian FA President Dragan Džajić and Serbia national football team Head coach Dragan "Piksi" Stojković. Dubočica finished the midseason league standings in second place. Despite decent results and favorable odds for promotion, club manager Dejan Čelar unexpectedly resigned following the team's 2–1 win over FK Inđija. The club administration hastily announced Marjan Živković as Čelar's successor during the winter break. With seven players out due to injury from the regular starting lineup Dubočica struggled to reverse their poor run of form in the second half of the season, leading to yet another change in management. The club hired Miodrag Anđelković to oversee the team for the remainder of the season, but the team succumbed to a disappointing 9th place in the bottom half of the relegation round play-off table.

Dubočica faced renewed scrutiny in the off-season over questions surrounding the club's financial dealings. Former players accused the club of withholding salaries and threatened legal action to recover unpaid wages. The club faced further scandal when the Football Association of Serbia deducted Dubočica 6 points and issued a €68,300 fine for alleged match-fixing in their 33rd round, 2023–24 Serbian First League fixture against FK Mladost GAT, a charge vehemently denied by the club. Dubočica president Dejan Savić criticized the media for their unfavorable coverage, claiming the club has a debt of approximately €188,000, which includes unpaid player salaries. Savić boasted of general improvements during his tenure, but acknowledged the club cannot indefinitely rely on municipal subsidies. Savić confirmed Dubočica aims to achieve financial sustainability through revenue generated by player transfers and sponsorship deal's, whilst setting a target for promotion to the SuperLiga by 2026.

In July 2024, Dubočica made two significant announcements with former club captain Dušan Savić appointed as the new Sporting Director, and Sava Šašić as the new coach. The club started the 2024–25 season with a revamped squad, hoping to improve its performance. However, Dubočica remained offensively weak, had the worst goals-against record in the league, and only managed three wins by the winter break. Sitting in 14th place in the relegation zone, manager Šašić parted ways with the club following a Round 18 loss to Borac Čačak.

In January 2025, GFK Dubočica appointed Nenad Mijailović as head coach ahead of the spring segment of the Serbian First League season, with the club struggling near the bottom of the table. Mijailović took over with the primary objective of ensuring league survival. Under his guidance, Dubočica improved in the second half of the 2024–25 Serbian First League, finishing 11th out of 16 teams and thus avoiding relegation.

Dubočica began the 2025–26 season amid persistent organisational and financial difficulties. In September 2025, the club issued an official press statement announcing that players, coaching staff and other employees had entered a strike due to unpaid salaries, bonuses, travel and competition costs, and lack of basic equipment, citing an “extremely difficult financial situation”. The statement appealed for public and institutional support to help prevent the club from ceasing to operate. Despite the strike announcement, training resumed after approximately two days, and Dubočica continued to fulfil fixtures for the rest of the season. During the autumn months, broader reporting on the club's situation documented that many players had not received wages for several months, with some reporting that the non-payment had caused severe personal hardship. A joint statement by players highlighted that they were among the few professional squads in Europe without regular salary payments, underscoring the gravity of the club's financial distress.

The situation culminated in December 2025, following Dubočica’s exit from the Serbian Cup Round of 16. Nenad Mijailović resigned as head coach, ending nearly a year in charge citing the prolonged non-payment of wages and the absence of active club officials which placed the burden of continuity on players and coaching staff as key reasons for his departure. Amid the season's ongoing turmoil, plans for a structural change in club management began to take shape. In late 2025, reports surfaced that the Belgrade-based construction and investment company Millennium Team would take over operational control and become a key sponsor to address longstanding financial issues. In January 2026, Dubočica confirmed that Ivan Bošnjak, co-CEO of Millennium Team, would assume the position of club president under the new management structure, with the aim of stabilising club finances and supporting long-term development.

In February 2026, the City Council of Leskovac adopted a resolution approving the transfer of founding rights of GFK Dubočica to the City of Leskovac and authorising the club's legal transformation from a non-profit sports association into a sports commercial company (sportsko-privredno društvo). Under the restructuring agreement, Millennium Team would acquire a 70% ownership stake, while the City of Leskovac would retained 30%. As part of the process, Millennium Team wrote off 75% of the club's reported €600,000 debt and financed player acquisitions during the winter transfer window. It was further announced that Dubočica’s youth academy would be relocated to Mrštane, utilising the existing facilities of FK Moravac, with the aim of strengthening the development of local players. The privatisation was presented as a measure to ensure financial stability and to support the club's long-term objective of promotion to the Serbian SuperLiga.

== List of Dubočica seasons ==
Key for table colours
Champions / Promotion
Promotion without championship
Relegation

Season	Club name	League	Tier	Pos.	Pl	W	D	L	GF	GA	Pts	Cup
2010–11	FK Dubočica	Srpska liga Istok	3	14th ↓	30	8	6	16	32	49	30	—
2011–12	Dubočica 1923	Niška zona	4	2nd ↑	30	23	1	6	77	20	70	—
2012–13	Dubočica 1923	Srpska liga Istok	3	6th	30	13	5	12	44	44	44	—
2013–14	Dubočica 1923	Srpska liga Istok	3	16th ↓	30	7	3	20	24	63	24	—
2014–15	Dubočica 1923	—	—	—	—	—	—	—	—	—	—	—
2015–16	GFK Dubočica	Jablanička okružna liga	5	1st ↑	34	23	2	9	93	41	71	—
2016–17	GFK Dubočica	Zona "Jug"	4	5th	30	13	4	13	67	54	43	—
2017–18	GFK Dubočica	Zona "Jug"	4	1st ↑	30	20	4	6	76	24	64	—
2018–19	GFK Dubočica	Srpska liga Istok	3	8th	34	14	3	17	62	66	45	—
2019–20	GFK Dubočica	Srpska liga Istok	3	12th ↑	17	6	4	7	22	22	19	—
2020–21	GFK Dubočica	Serbian First League	2	12th ↓	34	9	12	13	30	43	39	Round of 32
2021–22	GFK Dubočica	Srpska liga Istok	3	6th	30	13	5	12	36	31	44	Round of 32
2022–23	GFK Dubočica	Srpska liga Istok	3	1st ↑	30	21	6	3	72	22	69	Round of 32
2023–24	GFK Dubočica	Serbian First League	2	9th	37	12	14	11	33	38	50	Round of 32
2024–25	GFK Dubočica	Serbian First League	2	11th	37	10	11	16	43	57	41	Round of 16

- Note 1: The original FK Dubočica (founded 1923) competed until the 2014–15 season, when the club withdrew before competing and was subsequently disbanded.
- Note 2: The club was re-established in 2015 as GFK Dubočica.
- Note 3: Despite finishing 12th in 2019–20, Dubočica was promoted due to Serbian FA league restructuring.
- Note 4: Despite finishing 12th in 2020–21, the club was relegated due to league restructuring (eight teams relegated).
- All statistics sourced from Srbijasport.net.

== Crest and colours ==
The club crest is framed in bronze with six points. The white diagonal half of the emblem has the abbreviation "GFK" (ГФК) and "Dubočica" (ДУБОЧИЦА) in Cyrillic red lettering, whilst a bronze and white coloured football (previously a red star) rests at the top of the crest. The red diagonal portion features "Leskovac" (ЛЕСКОВАЦ) also in Cyrillic rendering in white letters. The year of establishment, "1923", is written in white at the bottom half of the crest. It is surrounded by a graphic representation of a bronze cog-like factory building with a smoking chimney stack.

First kit worn between 1923-1929

The club kit has traditionally consisted of the colours red and white, with red being the more dominant colour due to Dubočica's working-class roots.

== Stadium ==
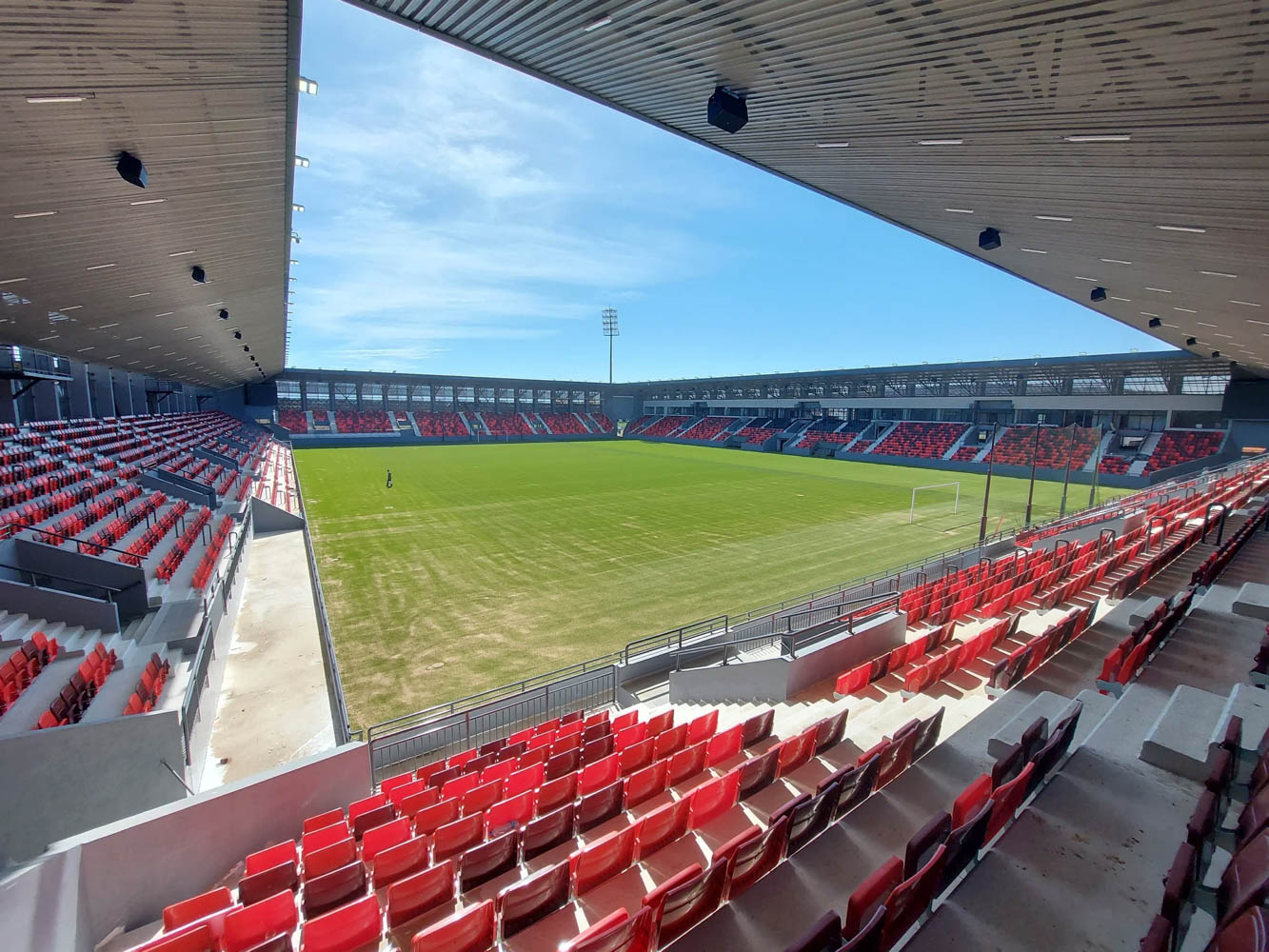
Dubočica Stadium

Previously the club's home ground was the City Stadium (Gradski stadion), commonly referred to as "Stadion Dubočica". Located south-east of the Leskovac city center, it featured a 2,514 capacity western stand, while the eastern terrace held approximately 4,500 standing spectators. The stadium which was owned buy the municipality had for decades been in a state of disrepair due to meager funding. The ground lacked floodlights, and electricity, while the hazardous eastern terrace suffers from repeated acts of trespass and vandalism. The construction of a new 8,000 capacity stadium began in 2021. Construction was initially delayed due to COVID-19 restrictions. The new Dubočica Stadium was completed in 2023.

== Supporters and rivalries ==
Dubočica was traditionally known as the working-class club of Leskovac. During the interwar period the team had bitter rivalries with SK Momčilo and SK Josif, two club's which represented the local middle class. During this era the club also developed long-standing rivalries with teams from Niš, particularly Radnički and FK Vlasina from neighbouring Vlasotince.

Dubočica's status improved significantly after World War II as most of its city rivals were disbanded by the Communists. Property and training grounds were allocated to Dubočica which became a prominent sporting institution for the youth of Leskovac. The club enjoyed a solid following whilst playing in the Yugoslav Second League during the golden era of the 1970s and 1980s, however, due to poor performance and the general state of Serbian football active support has dwindled.

Dubočica is the oldest football club in Leskovac and still maintains a level of sympathy within the local community. A devoted ultras group known as "Leskovac Wolves" (Serbian Cyrillic: Вукови Лесковац), regularly support the team at home and away fixtures. Dubočica contest the Leskovac derby with fellow city team Sloga Leskovac and Lemind 1953. The club also maintains rivalries with regional south Serbian clubs Radnički Niš, Radnički Pirot and Dinamo Vranje.

== Players ==
=== Current squad ===
As of 24 September 2026

Note: Flags indicate national team as defined under FIFA eligibility rules; some limited exceptions apply. Players may hold more than one non-FIFA nationality.

No.	Pos.	Nation	Player
1	GK	SRB	Miloš Mladenović (on loan from Radnički 1923)
2	DF	SRB	Aleksa Marković
3	DF	SRB	Filip Klarić
5	DF	SRB	Mateja Stojanović
6	MF	BFA	Mohamed Sidibe
7	MF	SRB	Petar Đuričković
8	MF	SRB	Mirsad Miraljemović
9	FW	SRB	David Ivić
11	MF	SRB	Dušan Živković (vice-captain)
12	GK	SRB	Strahinja Stanković
14	DF	SRB	Miloš Petrović
16	DF	SRB	Darko Mladenović
17	FW	SWE	Emil Roback
18	DF	GHA	Ali Umar
19	DF	MLI	Moussa Diallo
20	FW	SRB	Martin Anđelković

No.	Pos.	Nation	Player
21	DF	SRB	Mateja Novaković
22	FW	SRB	Lazar Stojanović
23	DF	SRB	Aleksandar Pavlović (captain)
25	DF	SRB	Bojan Balaž
30	DF	SRB	Miloš Zlatković
32	GK	SRB	Aleksa Milojević
33	FW	SEN	Fara Mendy
41	FW	GEQ	Noé Ela
42	DF	SRB	Uroš Đorđević
45	FW	SRB	Todor Topalović
50	MF	SRB	Miljan Ljubenović
55	DF	ESP	Raúl Chasco
73	DF	SRB	Nikola Tasić
91	DF	SRB	Pavle Bezarević
—	DF	ESP	Sergio Santos

=== Out on loan ===
Note: Flags indicate national team as defined under FIFA eligibility rules; some limited exceptions apply. Players may hold more than one non-FIFA nationality.

No.	Pos.	Nation	Player
—	DF	SRB	Predrag Đorđević (at Timok until the end of the 2026–27 season)

=== Coaching staff ===
As of 6 August 2026

Position	Name
Head coach	(Serbia) Albert Nađ
Assistant coach	(Serbia) Marko Mićović (Serbia) Dejan Ristić
Fitness coach	(Serbia) Đorđe Racić
Coach analyst	(Serbia) Nikola Nikolić
Goalkeeping coach	(Serbia) Zvezdan Stojanović
Physiotherapist	(Serbia) Tijana Krtić (Serbia) Marijana Kostić
Secretary of the technical staff	(Serbia) Goran Radević

=== Management ===
As of 6 August 2026

Position	Name
Sporting director	(Serbia) Bratislav Ristić
General secretary	(Serbia) Miloš Kocić
Secretary of the youth school	(Serbia) Dimitrije Ilić
Security commissioner	(Serbia) Milan Đikić
Economic	(Serbia) Dušan Jovanović

== Honours ==
=== National ===
- First Serbian League (2): 1974–75, 1975–76
- Serbian Football League (Group South) (1): 1972–73
- People's Republic of Serbia Championship (Zone V) (1): 1948–49
- Football Association of SR Serbia Cup (1): 1970

=== Regional ===
- Leskovac District League (7): 1935–36, 1937–38, 1938–39, 1940–41, 1943–44, 1946, 1946
- Leskovac City Cup (7): 1939, 1953, 1954, 1955, 1961, 1961, 1962
- South Morava Brigade Cup (3): 1953, 1954, 1955
- Niš Football Zone (2): 1959–60, 1966–67
- Niš Football Subassociation (2): 1954–55, 1955–56
- Serbian League East (1): 2022–23
- Zone League South (1): 2017–18
- Jablanica District League (1): 2015–16
- Morava District League (1): 1928–29

== Notable players ==
National team players

- (Socialist Federal Republic of Yugoslavia) Zoran Banković
- (Serbia and Montenegro) Marko Perović
- (Serbia and Montenegro) Aleksandar Kocić
- (Serbia and Montenegro) Radivoje Manić
- (Serbia and Montenegro) Bratislav Živković
- (Serbia) Miloš Kocić (youth)
- (Serbia) Saša Stamenković
- (Serbia) Aleksandar Filipović (youth)
- (Serbia) Nikola Tasić (youth)
- (Ivory Coast) Junior Tallo
- (Iraq) Ibrahim Salim Saad

For a list of all GFK Dubočica players with a Wikipedia article, see Category:GFK Dubočica players.

== Historical list of coaches ==
- (Socialist Federal Republic of Yugoslavia) Miloš Milutinović (1970–1971)
- (Federal Republic of Yugoslavia) Mihailo Ivanović (1994–1995)
- (Serbia) Milan Đorđević (2019)
- (Serbia) Dragan Stanković (2019–2020)
- (Serbia) Aleksandar Kuzmanović (2020)
- (Serbia) Saša Mrkić (2020–2021)
- (Serbia) Slaviša Božičić (Jul 2021-Dec 21)
- (Serbia) Marko Perović (Jan 2022-Sep22)
- (Serbia) Dejan Čelar (Sep 2022-2023)
- (Serbia) Marjan Zivković (Jan 2024-Mar 2024)
- (Serbia) Boban Cenić (caretaker)(2024)
- (Serbia) Miodrag Anđelković (27 Mar 2024-Jun 24)
- (Serbia) Sava Šašić (1 Jul 2024-31 Dec 24)
- (Serbia) Nenad Mijailović (13 Jan 2025-7 December 25)
