= Šilovo =

Šilovo may refer to the following places:

- Šilovo (Lebane), a village in the municipality of Lebane, Serbia
- Šilovo (Gjilan), a village in the municipality of Gjilan, Kosovo

or:

- Pusto Šilovo, a village in the municipality of Medveđa, Serbia

== See also ==
- Dešilovo, a village in the municipality of Merošina, Serbia
