= 2010 Canadian Soccer League season =

Givova Canadian Soccer League First Division
- Season: 2010
- Champions: York Region Shooters (regular season); Brantford Galaxy SC (playoffs)
- Matches: 156
- Goals: 494 (3.17 per match)
- Top goalscorer: Tihomir Maletić 17
- Best goalkeeper: Miloš Kocić
- Biggest home win: Hamilton Croatia 6–2 London City (30 July 2010); Milltown FC 6–0 Brantford Galaxy SC (12 September 2010)
- Biggest away win: North York Astros 0–7 London City (8 August 2010)
- Highest scoring: London City 3–7 Portugal FC (23 July 2010) (10 goals)

The 2010 Canadian Soccer League season (known as the Givova Canadian Soccer League for sponsorship reasons) was the 13th since its establishment where a total of 24 teams from Ontario and Quebec took part in the league. The season began on Saturday May 8, 2010, and ended on October 31. Brantford Galaxy SC won their first championship in their inaugural season with a 3–0 win over Hamilton Croatia in the CSL Championship Final at the Centennial Park Stadium in Toronto on October 31, 2010. The CSL administration restructured the league by combining both the International & National divisions to form the CSL First Division with a single table structure. The regular season title was claimed by the York Region Shooters, while the Serbian White Eagles Res. won their first reserve league championship.

The league was granted full membership in the Canadian Soccer Association allowing the CSL to work closely with the CSA in order to continue creating the developmental system required in the development of Canadian players, referees, coaches, and administrators . The season also witnessed the appointment of Domenic Di Gironimo as the new Commissioner after the resignation of Cary Kaplan at the conclusion of the 2009 season. The commissioner was appointed to the CSA Professional Soccer Committee to further continue the planned expansion of the league to a fully national league with regional divisions under the CSL banner. The league expanded throughout Ontario to include the Brant County, Hamilton, and Halton Region territories. The Montreal Impact ended their affiliation with Trois-Rivières Attak, but entered the Montreal Impact Academy as their academy team becoming the second professional academy club to join the league. The Reserve Division also expanded for the first time beyond the Greater Toronto Area to include 11 reserve teams, and an entry-level club Ottawa FC.

The CSL reached a sponsorship agreement with Givova which granted the company the naming rights to the league, and to the CSL Championship. Other major sponsorship's included Days Inns – Canada, and a record broadcasting agreement with Rogers TV, which provided coverage of 45 matches including all playoff games to the provinces of Ontario, New Brunswick and Newfoundland through the Rogers Super Sports Pack.

== Changes from 2009 season ==
- Single table structure.
- Four new expansion clubs: Montreal Impact Academy, Milltown FC, Brantford Galaxy SC and Hamilton Croatia.
- Trois-Rivières Attak ended cooperation with Montreal Impact; they announced that they would take a sabbatical year in 2010 and return for the 2011 season.
- Ottawa FC played as a guest team in the Reserve Division.
- Teams played a balanced schedule of 24 games.

== Teams ==
Team	City	Stadium	Manager
Brampton Lions	Brampton, Ontario (Bramalea)	Victoria Park Stadium	Armando Costa
Brantford Galaxy	Brantford, Ontario	Steve Brown Sports Complex	Lazo Džepina
Hamilton Croatia	Hamilton, Ontario	Brian Timmis Stadium	Ron Davidson
London City	London, Ontario (Westmount)	Cove Road Stadium	Luka Shaqiri
Milltown F.C.	Milton, Ontario (Clarke)	Bishop Reding SS	Rafael Carbajal
Montreal Impact Academy	Montreal, Quebec	Saputo Stadium	Philippe Eullaffroy
North York Astros	Toronto, Ontario (North York)	Esther Shiner Stadium	Gerardo Lezcano
Portugal FC	Toronto, Ontario (Liberty Village)	Lamport Stadium	Carmine Isacco
Serbian White Eagles	Toronto, Ontario (Etobicoke)	Centennial Park Stadium	Niki Budalić
St. Catharines Wolves	St. Catharines, Ontario (Vansickle)	Club Roma Stadium	James McGillivray
TFC Academy	Toronto, Ontario (Exhibition Place)	BMO Field	Jason Bent
Toronto Croatia	Toronto, Ontario (Etobicoke)	Centennial Park Stadium	Alen Vukobrad
York Region Shooters	Vaughan, Ontario (Maple)	St. Joan Of Arc Turf Field	Filipe Bento

=== Coaching changes ===
Team	Outgoing coach	Manner of departure	Date of vacancy	Position in table	Incoming coach	Date of appointment
Brampton Lions	Goran Rapaic	Replaced	June 27, 2010	13th in June	Armando Costa	June 27, 2010
North York Astros	Michael Ridout	Resigned	July 4, 2010	6th in July	Gerardo Lezcano	July 10, 2010
London City	Andrew Loague	Resigned	July 15, 2010	12th in July	Luka Shaqiri	July 15, 2010
Toronto Croatia	Kreso Grnjto	Replaced	August 7, 2010	9th in August	Daniel Leko	August 17, 2010
Toronto Croatia	Daniel Leko	End of interim spell	September 15, 2010	10th in September	Alen Vukobrad	September 15, 2010
Serbian White Eagles	Duško Prijić	Sacked	September 14, 2010	3rd in September	Niki Budalić	September 15, 2010

Location of CSL teams outside of Toronto for the 2010 CSL season.
Location of CSL teams in Toronto for the 2010 CSL season.

== Results table ==
All stats as of games played October 9, 2010:

Home \ Away	BMP	BNF	HAM	LON	MIL	MTL	NYA	POR	SER	STC	TFCA	TOR	YRS
Brampton Lions		1–0	2–2	2–0	0–1	1–0	1–3	2–0	0–0	2–1	1–2	2–2	0–2
Brantford Galaxy	1–1		3–3	2–1	3–0	1–0	4–1	3–3	2–3	0–2	2–3	2–1	5–2
Hamilton Croatia	3–1	2–2		6–2	1–0	2–0	5–0	0–2	0–1	6–1	2–1	0–1	1–1
London City	1–5	2–2	3–4		1–1	2–2	0–3	3–7	1–1	2–1	3–1	0–2	2–2
Milltown FC	2–1	6–0	2–1	2–2		0–1	3–0	4–3	1–0	4–0	1–1	1–1	2–1
Montreal Impact Academy	2–2	0–1	0–0	3–0	0–0		3–0	0–2	1–3	5–0	1–1	3–1	0–1
North York Astros	3–2	5–2	0–1	0–7	2–4	1–1		3–4	0–5	1–3	0–1	2–2	2–4
Portugal FC	2–0	3–2	0–5	5–1	1–0	2–3	1–0		0–0	1–1	1–3	4–2	2–3
Serbian White Eagles	1–1	3–1	1–0	4–0	0–2	3–2	0–1	0–0		2–0	1–1	2–0	3–0
St. Catharines Wolves	2–1	1–2	0–3	2–2	0–5	0–2	2–0	0–2	0–4		2–2	0–3	0–2
TFC Academy	3–0	3–2	1–2	1–1	1–0	1–1	2–1	1–0	1–1	0–0		1–3	0–1
Toronto Croatia	2–2	1–2	0–2	0–2	1–1	3–2	4–3	1–1	1–1	2–1	0–1		2–2
York Region Shooters	2–3	4–1	3–0	3–0	1–1	4–2	1–1	2–0	1–1	1–0	1–0	1–1	

Updated to match(es) played on 9 October 2010. Source: Canadian Soccer League
Legend: Blue = home team win; Yellow = draw; Red = away team win.

== Standings ==
Pos	Team	Pld	W	D	L	GF	GA	GD	Pts	Qualification
1	York Region Shooters (A, C)	24	13	7	4	45	29	+16	46	Qualified for the Givova CSL Cup play-offs
2	Serbian White Eagles (A)	24	12	9	3	40	16	+24	45	Qualified for the Givova CSL Cup play-offs
3	Hamilton Croatia (A)	24	13	5	6	51	27	+24	44	Qualified for the Givova CSL Cup play-offs
4	Milltown FC (A)	24	12	7	5	43	22	+21	43	Qualified for the Givova CSL Cup play-offs
5	Portugal FC (A)	24	11	5	8	46	39	+7	38	Qualified for the Givova CSL Cup play-offs
6	TFC Academy (A)	24	10	8	6	32	27	+5	38	Qualified for the Givova CSL Cup play-offs
7	Brantford Galaxy (A, O)	24	9	5	10	45	51	−6	32	Qualified for the Givova CSL Cup play-offs
8	Toronto Croatia (A)	24	7	9	8	36	38	−2	30	Qualified for the Givova CSL Cup play-offs
9	Montreal Impact Academy	24	7	7	10	34	31	+3	28	
10	Brampton Lions	24	7	7	10	33	37	−4	28	
11	London City	24	4	8	12	38	61	−23	20	
12	North York Astros	24	5	3	16	32	62	−30	18	
13	St. Catharines Wolves	24	4	4	16	19	54	−35	16	

Updated to match(es) played on October 13, 2010. Source: rocketrobinsoccerintoronto.com
Rules for classification: 1) points; 2) goal difference; 3) number of goals scored.
(A) Advance to a further round; (C) Champions; (O) Play-off winners

== Playoffs ==
The postseason format began with a two-leg quarterfinal home and away series, followed by a one-game semifinal for the four surviving teams and a one-game final on Sunday, October 31.

The top four teams had the option to play their first quarterfinal game at home or away and the home venue was awarded to the top seeded teams that advanced to the semifinals. The CSL Championship Final was played at Centennial Stadium in Etobicoke on October 31 and received coverage from Rogers TV.

In the event teams were tied on points in the final league standings, CSL rules provided for the following tiebreakers in the order listed:

1. Total wins in regular season games.
2. Head-to-head record based on total points in league games.
3. Goal difference in regular season games.
4. Goals scored in regular season games.

In the unlikely event teams were still tied, the rules provided for the lowest number of disciplinary points during regular season games and if necessary, by the luck of the draw.

In the quarterfinals, the two-game home and away series was decided by total points and if tied on points, it was to be total goals over the two games. There was to be a two 15-minute periods of extra time and FIFA penalty kicks in each game, if necessary. The semifinal and CSL Championship Final was one game, with two 15-minute periods of extra time and FIFA penalty kicks, if necessary.

=== Bracket ===
Quarterfinals
1	(Ontario) York Region Shooters	0	1	1
8	(Ontario) Toronto Croatia	2	1	3
4	(Ontario) Hamilton Croatia	2	1	3
5	(Ontario) TFC Academy	1	0	1
2	(Ontario) Milltown FC	0	2	2
7	(Ontario) Portugal FC	1	2	3
3	(Ontario) Serbian White Eagles	0	0	0
6	(Ontario) Brantford Galaxy SC (a.e.t.)	0	1	1

Semifinals
(Ontario) Toronto Croatia	0
(Ontario) Hamilton Croatia	2
(Ontario) Portugal FC	3
(Ontario) Brantford Galaxy SC	5

Final
(Ontario) Hamilton Croatia	0
(Ontario) Brantford Galaxy SC	3

=== Quarterfinals ===
October 12, 2010	Toronto Croatia	2–0	York Region Shooters	Toronto, Ontario
8:00 ET	Žgela 63'; Tihomir Maletic 88'	(Report)		Stadium: Centennial Park Stadium; Attendance: 120; Referee: David Barrie (Ontario)

October 17, 2010	York Region Shooters	1–1	Toronto Croatia	Vaughan, Ontario
6:00 ET	Jason De Thomasis 28'	(Report)	Tihomir Maletic 55'	Stadium: St. Joan Of Arc Turf Field

Toronto won the series on goals on aggregate, 3–1.

October 12, 2010	Brantford Galaxy	0–0	Serbian White Eagles	Brantford, Ontario
8:00 ET		(Report)		Stadium: Steve Brown Sports Complex

October 17, 2010	Serbian White Eagles	0–1 (a.e.t.)	Brantford Galaxy	Toronto, Ontario
8:00 ET		(Report)	Bakula 100'	Stadium: Esther Shiner Stadium; Attendance: 300; Referee: Manuel Orellano (Ontario)

Brantford won the series on goals on aggregate, 1–0.

October 12, 2010	Milltown FC	0–1	Portugal FC	Milton, Ontario
8:00 ET		(Report)	Carlos Nogueira 26'	Stadium: Bishop Reding SS

October 16, 2010	Portugal FC	2–2	Milltown FC	Toronto, Ontario
6:00 ET	Lombardo 70'; Bedenikovic 86'	(Report)	Martin Artale 37', 74'	Stadium: Lamport Stadium; Attendance: 120; Referee: Matt Arduini (Ontario)

Portugal FC won the series on goals on aggregate, 3–2.

October 13, 2010	TFC Academy	1–2	Hamilton Croatia	Toronto, Ontario
9:00 ET	Morgan 51'	(Report)	Corporal 32'; Razumović 84'	Stadium: Centennial Park Stadium; Attendance: 300; Referee: Justin Tasev (Ontario)

October 17, 2010	Hamilton Croatia	1–0	TFC Academy	Hamilton, Ontario
7:00 ET	Corporal 70'	(Report)		Stadium: Brian Timmis Stadium

Hamilton won the series on goals on aggregate, 3–1.

=== Semifinals ===
October 22, 2010	Portugal FC	3–5	Brantford Galaxy	Toronto, Ontario
8:00 ET	Jarek Whiteman 40'; Lombardo 49'; Mirabelli 87'	(Report)	Golijanin 21', 34', 62'; Anđelković 51'; Kyle Grootenboer 61'	Stadium: Centennial Park Stadium; Attendance: 150; Referee: Matthew Bordeau (Ontario)

October 24, 2010	Hamilton Croatia	2–0	Toronto Croatia	Hamilton, Ontario
7:00 ET	O'Keeffe 27'; Adam Leggett 54'	(Report)		Stadium: Brian Timmis Stadium; Attendance: 1500; Referee: David Barrie (Ontario)

=== Givova CSL Championship ===
October 31
2:15 ET

Hamilton Croatia	0–3	Brantford Galaxy
	Report	Fazlagić 27', 65'; Golijanin 59'

Centennial Park Stadium, Toronto, Ontario
Attendance: 1800
Referee: Justin Tasev (Ontario)

GK	22	(Canada) Melford James Jr.
RB	3	(Canada) Alvin Hudson
CB	9	(Canada) Tom Bilic
CB	18	(Croatia) Ivan Razumović	(substituted off) 64'
LB	17	(Hungary) Péter Tereánszki-Tóth
RM	12	(Canada) Daniel Niksic	(substituted off) 35'
CM	20	(Canada) Jamie Dodds (c)
CM	14	(Republic of Ireland) Aidan O'Keeffe	(substituted off) 75'
LM	19	(Canada) Adam Leggett	(substituted off) 84'
ST	23	(Canada) Jason Shannon	(substituted off) 56'
ST	6	(Liberia) Preston Corporal
Substitutes:
GK	1	(Canada) Ante Culina
DF	5	(Canada) Martin Mamic
DF	50	(Canada) Andrew Leggett	(substituted on) 84'
MF	7	(Canada) Boris Vurdelja	(substituted on) 35'
MF	11	(Canada) Danny Jirta	(substituted on) 64'
FW	2	(Croatia) Domagoj Bešlić	(substituted on) 56'
FW	10	(Canada) Jerko Grubisic	(substituted on) 75'
Manager:
(Canada) Ron Davidson

GK	1	(Croatia) Ante Domjanovic (c)
RB	4	(Canada) Zach Tait	(substituted off) 86'
CB	10	(Bosnia and Herzegovina) Zvonko Bakula
CB	3	(Bosnia and Herzegovina) Stanko Karačić
LB	6	(Croatia) Dragan Oluic
RM	2	(Canada) Kyle Grootenboer
CM	25	(Liberia) Patrick Gerhardt
CM	9	(Serbia) Miodrag Anđelković	(substituted off) 88'
LM	15	(Serbia) Nenad Begović	(substituted off) 75'
FW	8	(Bosnia and Herzegovina) Haris Fazlagić	(substituted off) 89'
FW	11	(Serbia) Ranko Golijanin	(substituted off) 83'
Substitutes:
GK	0	(Canada) Jeff Martins
DF	12	(Canada) Bob Turnbull	(substituted on) 86'
MF	13	(Canada) Patryk Misik	(substituted on) 88'
MF	14	(Canada) Austin White	(substituted on) 75'
MF	7	(Canada) Ben Turnbull
MF	27	(Canada) Stefan Dancetovic	(substituted on) 83'
FW	16	(Canada) Jake Simmons	(substituted on) 89'
Manager:
(Croatia) Lazo Džepina

Assistant referees:
Steve Senderovich
Richard Oliveira
Fourth official:
David Barrie

== Goal scorers ==
2010 Goal Scorers
Rank	Player	Team	Goals
1	Tihomir Maletić	Toronto Croatia	17
2	Miloš Šćepanović	Serbian White Eagles	14
3	Aidan O'Keeffe	Hamilton Croatia	12
3	Kadian Lecky	York Region Shooters	12
5	Ranko Golijanin	Brantford Galaxy	11
6	Mahyar Khobad	North York Astros	10
6	Lesly St. Fleur	Milltown FC	10
6	Miodrag Anđelković	Brantford Galaxy	10
9	Blazej Skoczylas	Brampton Lions	9
9	Andrea Lombardo	Portugal FC	9

== CSL Executive Committee and Staff ==
The 2010 CSL Executive Committee.

Position	Name	Nationality
Commissioner:	Domenic Di Gironimo	(Canada) Canadian
Director of Media and PR:	Stan Adamson	(England) English
League Administrator:	Pino Jazbec	(Canada) Canadian
Director of Officials:	Tony Camacho	(Portugal) Portuguese

== Individual awards ==
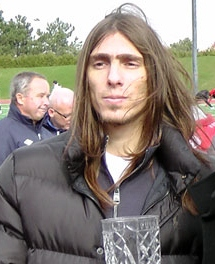
Tihomir Maletic received both the MVP and Golden Boot

The annual CSL awards were presented before the CSL Championship final on October 31, 2010. Toronto Croatia and York Region Shooters accumulated the most awards with 2 wins each. The MVP and Golden Boot was presented to Tihomir Maletic, a veteran striker for Toronto Croatia. The Serbian White Eagles established the best defensive record throughout the season, and as a result Milos Kocic, a Toronto FC player on loan was given the Goalkeeper of the Year. The league chose Trinidadian international Rick Titus with the Defender of the Year, after contributing to York Region's regular season title. Tony De Thomasis was awarded the Harry Paul Gauss award for his commitment and allegiance to the league.

London City produced another Rookie of the Year with Thomas Beattie, who later advanced to the S.League. After leading Hamilton Croatia to the CSL Championship final Ron Davidson was named the Coach of the Year. The CSL Referee Committee voted Geoff Gamble for the Referee of the Year., and TFC Academy received their second Fair Play and Respect award.

Award	Player (Club)
CSL Most Valuable Player	Tihomir Maletic (Toronto Croatia)
CSL Golden Boot	Tihomir Maletic (Toronto Croatia)
CSL Goalkeeper of the Year Award	Milos Kocic (Serbian White Eagles)
CSL Defender of the Year Award	Rick Titus (York Region Shooters)
CSL Rookie of the Year Award	Thomas Beattie (London City)
CSL Coach of the Year Award	Ron Davidson (Hamilton Croatia)
Harry Paul Gauss Award	Tony De Thomasis (York Region Shooters)
CSL Referee of the Year Award	Geoff Gamble
CSL Fair Play Award	TFC Academy

== CSL Reserve League ==
Canadian Soccer League Reserve Division
- Season: 2010
- Champions: Brampton Lions B (Second Division regular season); Serbian White Eagles B (Second Division playoffs)
- Matches: 82
- Goals: 275 (3.35 per match)
- Top goalscorer: Wesley Cain; Jonathan Singh (7)

The reserve league expanded for the first time beyond the Greater Toronto Area border to include 11 teams. While the division operated as feeder and youth developmental system it also began to serve as entry-level division to the First Division for clubs with a limited amount of financial resources. All first division clubs operated a reserve team with the except of Toronto Croatia, London City, and the Montreal Impact Academy. Throughout the regular season Brampton Lions won the regular season title, while the Serbian White Eagles claimed the championship.

=== Teams ===
Team	City	Stadium	Manager
Brampton City United B	Brampton, Ontario	Victoria Park Stadium	
Brantford Inter-City SC	Brantford, Ontario	Steve Brown Sports Complex	Peter Pollilo Carmine Romano
Hamilton Croatia Res	Hamilton, Ontario	Brian Timmis Stadium	Anthony Giaitzis
Milltown FC Res	Mississauga, Ontario	Hershey Centre	Vladimir Klinovsky
North York Astros B	Toronto, Ontario	Esther Shiner Stadium	
Portugal FC Res	Toronto, Ontario	Lamport Stadium	
Ottawa FC	Ottawa, Ontario	St. Joan Of Arc Turf Field	
Serbian White Eagles B	Toronto, Ontario	Centennial Park Stadium	
St. Catharines Wolves B	St. Catharines, Ontario	Club Roma Stadium	Clayton Rosario
TFC Academy II	Liberty Village, Toronto	Lamport Stadium	Stuart Neely
York Region Shooters B	Vaughan, Ontario	St. Joan Of Arc Turf Field	

=== Final standings ===
Pos	Team	Pld	W	D	L	GF	GA	GD	Pts	Qualification
1	Brampton Lions Reserves	15	11	1	3	42	17	+25	34	Qualification for Playoffs
2	Brantford Galaxy Res.	15	10	2	3	34	13	+21	32	Qualification for Playoffs
3	TFC Academy II	15	9	3	3	36	14	+22	30	Qualification for Playoffs
4	York Region Shooters Res.	15	8	3	4	29	20	+9	27	Qualification for Playoffs
5	Portugal Res.	15	6	3	6	34	28	+6	21	Qualification for Playoffs
6	Ottawa FC	15	6	2	7	11	29	−18	20	Qualification for Playoffs
7	Milltown FC Res.	15	5	4	6	18	28	−10	19	Qualification for Playoffs
8	Serbian White Eagles Res.	15	5	2	8	21	42	−21	17	Qualification for Playoffs
9	Hamilton Croatia Res.	15	4	2	9	22	38	−16	14	
10	St. Catharines Wolves Res.	15	3	4	8	18	28	−10	13	
11	North York Astros Res.	15	2	2	11	10	40	−30	8	

Updated to match(es) played on October 11, 2010. Source:
Rules for classification: 1) points; 2) goal difference; 3) number of goals scored.

=== Final ===
October 23, 2010	Serbian White Eagles Res.	2-0	York Region Shooters Res.	Vaughan, Ontario
	Dimitrov 50'; Vukovic 60'	(Report)		Stadium: St. Joan Of Arc Turf Field

== Individual awards ==
Award	Player (Club)
CSL Most Valuable Player	Sergio Camargo (TFC Academy II)
CSL Golden Boot	Wesley Cain (Portugal FC Res.); Jonathan Singh (Brampton Lions Res.)
CSL Goalkeeper of the Year Award	Jesse Castillo (Brantford Galaxy Res.)
CSL Defender of the Year Award	David Ferreira (Brampton Lions Res.)
CSL Rookie of the Year Award	Sergio Camargo (TFC Academy II)
CSL Coach of the Year Award	Alex Di Matteo (Brampton Lions Res.)
