= Noé Ela =

Equatoguinean footballer (born 2003)

Personal information
- Full name: Noé Nsue Ela
- Birth name: Noé Ela Mangue
- Date of birth: 17 April 2003 (age 23)
- Place of birth: Madrid, Spain
- Height: 1.85 m (6 ft 1 in)
- Position: Forward

Team information
- Current team: Dubočica

Youth career
- 2014–2017: CD Pinosierra
- 2017–2019: RC Alcobendas
- 2019–2021: Leganés

Senior career*
Years	Team	Apps	(Gls)
2021–2023	Logroñés B	37	(3)
2022–2023	Logroñés	4	(0)
2023–2024	Numancia	18	(2)
2024–2025	Alavés C	23	(2)
2025–2026	Chieti	0	(0)
2026–	Dubočica	0	(0)

International career^{‡}
2023–	Equatorial Guinea	4	(0)
- * Club domestic league appearances and goals as of 5 October 2024 ‡ National team caps and goals as of 21:37, 13 January 2024 (UTC)

Noé Nsue Ela (born 17 April 2003), known in Spain as Noé Ela Mangue, is a professional footballer who plays as a forward for Serbian First League club Dubočica. Born in Spain, he plays for the Equatorial Guinea national team.

== Career ==
Ela is a youth product of CD Pinosierra, Rayo Ciudad Alcobendas and Leganés, before transferring to Logroñés in 2021. He began his senior career with their reserves, before debuting with their senior team in 2022. On 10 August 2023, he transferred to Numancia.

Ela signed for Italian club Chieti on 28 November 2025.

In September 2026, Ela signed for Serbian club GFK Dubočica.

== International career ==
Born in Spain, Ela is of Equatoguinean descent. He made his international debut with the Equatorial Guinea national team in a friendly 1–1 penalty shootout win over Libya on 6 September 2023. He was called up to the national team for the 2023 Africa Cup of Nations.
