= Dešilovo =

Dešilovo Дешилово
- Village
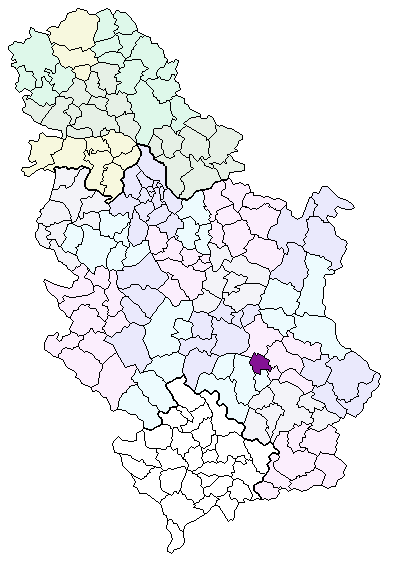
- Location of Merošina municipality in Serbia

- Location within Serbia
- Country: Serbia
- District: Nišava
- Municipality: Merošina
- Time zone: UTC+1 (CET)
  - Summer (DST): UTC+2 (CEST)

Dešilovo (Serbian Cyrillic: Дешилово) a village in the municipality of Merošina, Serbia.

== See also ==
- Šilovo (disambiguation)
