= Stanko Karačić =

Bosnian footballer (born 1986)

Personal information
- Date of birth: 2 January 1986 (age 40)
- Place of birth: Mostar, SR Bosnia, SFR Yugoslavia
- Position: Defender

Youth career
- 2004: Široki Brijeg

Senior career*
Years	Team	Apps	(Gls)
2008–2009	Posušje	7	(0)
2009	Brotnjo		
2010–2011	Brantford Galaxy		
2013–2014	Grude		
- * Club domestic league appearances and goals

Stanko Karačić (born 2 January 1986) is a former Bosnian footballer who played as a defender.

== Club career ==
=== Early career ===
Karačić played his youth football with Široki Brijeg. In 2008, he joined Posušje in the Premier League of Bosnia and Herzegovina. After a single season in the Bosnian top tier, he played with Brotnjo in the third division.

=== Canada ===
Karačić ventured abroad in the summer of 2010 to play in the Canadian Soccer League with the expansion side Brantford Galaxy. In his debut season in the Canadian circuit, he helped Brantford secure a playoff berth by finishing seventh in the league's first division. In the opening round of the postseason, Brantford defeated the Serbian White Eagles in a two-game series. He assisted the team in the next round by defeating Portugal FC in the semifinal round. Karačić participated in the championship final where Brantford defeated Hamilton Croatia for the title.

He re-signed with Brantford for the 2011 season. The club failed to secure a playoff berth in his second season with Brantford.

=== Bosnia ===
Karačić returned to the Bosnian third-tier league to play with Grude where he played in the 2013–14 Bosnia and Herzegovina Football Cup. In 2014, he began playing at the minifootball level.

== Honors ==
Brantford Galaxy

- CSL Championship: 2010
