= Raúl Chasco =

Spanish footballer (born 2003)

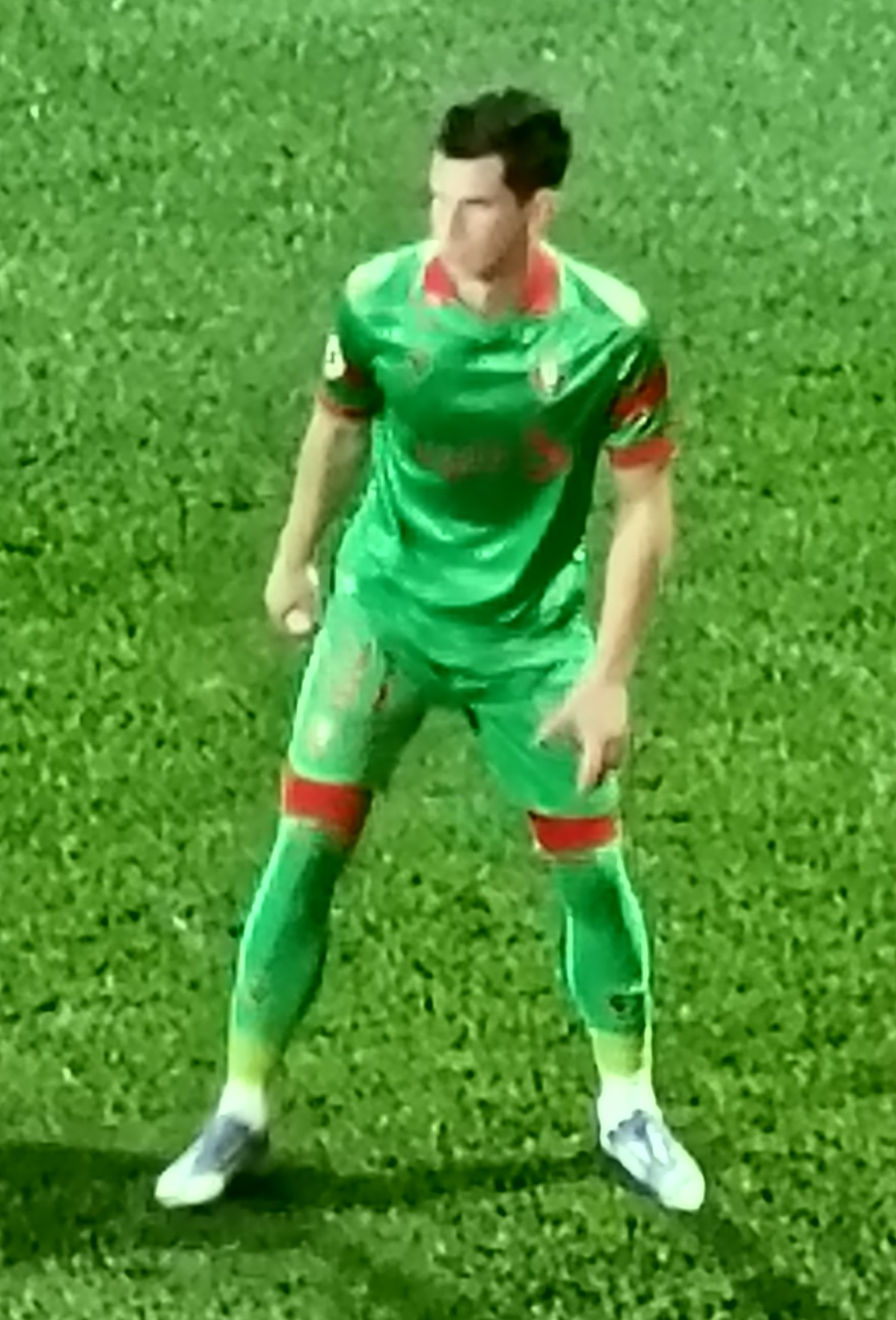
- Arguibide playing for Osasuna B in 2025

Personal information
- Full name: Raúl Chasco Ruiz
- Date of birth: 13 September 2003 (age 23)
- Place of birth: Pamplona, Spain
- Height: 1.79 m (5 ft 10 in)
- Position: Left-back

Youth career
- Txantrea
- 2019–2021: Athletic Bilbao

Senior career*
Years	Team	Apps	(Gls)
2021–2022	Basconia	28	(0)
2022–2023	Bilbao Athletic	32	(0)
2023–2025	Valladolid B	36	(0)
2024–2025	Valladolid	2	(0)
2025–2026	Osasuna B	30	(1)
- * Club domestic league appearances and goals as of 23 May 2026

Raúl Chasco Ruiz (born 13 September 2003) is a Spanish footballer who plays as a left-back.

== Career ==
Chasco was born in Pamplona, Navarre, and joined Athletic Bilbao's youth setup in 2019, from UDC Txantrea. He made his senior debut with farm team CD Basconia during the 2021–22 season, in Tercera División RFEF.

Chasco first appeared with the reserves on 12 February 2022, starting in a 1–0 Primera División RFEF home win over Zamora CF. In the following campaign, he was a regular starter for the B-side as they suffered relegation.

On 15 August 2023, Chasco signed a two-year contract with Real Valladolid, being initially assigned to the B-team in Segunda Federación. He made his professional – and La Liga – debut on 27 September 2024, coming on as a second-half substitute for Luis Pérez in a 2–1 home loss to RCD Mallorca.

On 2 July 2025, Chasco agreed to a one-year deal with hometown side CA Osasuna, initially as a member of the reserves in Primera Federación.
