= Miodrag Anđelković =

Serbian footballer (born 1977)

Miodrag Anđelković Миодраг Анђелковић
- Anđelković in 2010

Personal information
- Full name: Miodrag Anđelković
- Date of birth: 7 February 1977 (age 49)
- Place of birth: Mitrovica, Kosovo, SFR Yugoslavia
- Height: 1.87 m (6 ft 1 1/2 in)
- Position: Striker

Youth career
- Trepča
- OFK Beograd

Senior career*
Years	Team	Apps	(Gls)
1995–1996	OFK Beograd	18	(1)
1997	Espanyol	3	(0)
1997	Almería	4	(0)
1997	SpVgg Greuther Fürth	2	(0)
1998	Hapoel Petah Tikva	11	(0)
1999–2000	OFK Beograd	27	(11)
2000	Sartid Smederevo	10	(7)
2000–2001	Antalyaspor	18	(3)
2001	Fluminense	14	(3)
2002	Coritiba	0	(0)
2002	OFK Beograd	1	(0)
2002–2003	Widzew Łódź	18	(1)
2003	OFK Beograd	7	(2)
2004	Incheon United	11	(4)
2004	Cerezo Osaka	4	(1)
2005	Irtysh Pavlodar	6	(1)
2005	Metalurh Zaporizhya	10	(2)
2006	Al-Ahli		
2007	OFK Beograd	9	(0)
2007	Dalian Shide	16	(2)
2008	Yantai Yiteng	22	(7)
2009	Pandurii Târgu Jiu	5	(0)
2009	Internațional Curtea de Argeș	1	(0)
2010	Brantford Galaxy	19	(10)
2011	Mladenovac	13	(0)
Total		249	(55)

Managerial career
- 2018: OFK Beograd (caretaker)
- 2020–2021: OFK Beograd
- 2022: Sloga Kraljevo
- 2022–2023: Loznica
- 2024: Dubočica
- * Club domestic league appearances and goals

Miodrag Anđelković (Serbian Cyrillic: Миодраг Анђелковић; born 7 February 1977) is a Serbian professional football manager and former player who played as a striker.

A journeyman, Anđelković represented 21 clubs from 14 different countries in 15 years of his active playing career.

== Playing career ==
Born in Kosovska Mitrovica, Anđelković started out at his hometown club Trepča. He joined OFK Beograd as a youngster, making his senior debuts during the 1995–96 season. In the 1997 winter transfer window, Anđelković went abroad to Spain and signed with Espanyol. He made two La Liga appearances, before switching to Segunda División side Almería until the end of the 1996–97 season. Subsequently, Anđelković played for SpVgg Greuther Fürth and Hapoel Petah Tikva, before returning to OFK Beograd in 1999. He scored nine league goals for the side in the 1999–2000 campaign, before switching to Sartid Smederevo in March 2000, netting seven more for a total of 16 goals that season. In June 2000, Anđelković moved abroad again and signed for Turkish side Antalyaspor, alongside Nikola Damjanac.

Over the following decade, Anđelković would go on to play in Brazil (Fluminense and Coritiba), Poland (Widzew Łódź), South Korea (Incheon United), Japan (Cerezo Osaka), Kazakhstan (Irtysh Pavlodar), China (Dalian Shide and Yantai Yiteng), as well as in Romania (Pandurii Târgu Jiu and Internațional Curtea de Argeș).

In 2010, Anđelković went overseas to Canada to sign with Brantford Galaxy of the Canadian Soccer League. He helped them win the CSL Championship against Hamilton Croatia. On 21 July 2010, Anđelković was part of the Toronto FC side in an international friendly against Bolton Wanderers at BMO Field. He lastly played for Mladenovac in his homeland during the 2011–12 season.

== Post-playing career ==
In September 2013, Anđelković was appointed as assistant manager to Zlatko Krmpotić at OFK Beograd. He later also served as an assistant to Petar Divić and Žarko Todorović. In October 2018, Anđelković acted as OFK Beograd caretaker manager in one Serbian League Belgrade game. In 2020, he was named the manager for OFK Beograd on a full-time basis. On 7 December 2021, he announced his departure from OFK Beograd.

In the summer of 2022, he was named the manager for FK Loznica. He was dismissed from his post on 15 March 2023.

Anđelković was announced as manager of Dubočica in March 2024. His tenure with Dubočica lasted several months as he resigned in June 2024.

== Statistics ==
Club	Season	League		Cup	
Club	Season	Apps	Goals	Apps	Goals
OFK Beograd	1995–96	13	1	0	0
OFK Beograd	1996–97	5	0	0	0
Espanyol	1996–97	3	0	0	0
Almería	1996–97	4	0	0	0
SpVgg Greuther Fürth	1997–98	2	0	1	0
Hapoel Petah Tikva	1998–99	11	0		
OFK Beograd	1998–99	4	2	0	0
OFK Beograd	1999–2000	23	9	0	0
Sartid Smederevo	1999–2000	10	7	0	0
Antalyaspor	2000–01	18	3	2	1
Fluminense	2001	14	3	0	0
Coritiba	2002	0	0	1	0
OFK Beograd	2001–02	1	0	0	0
Widzew Łódź	2002–03	18	1	4	1
OFK Beograd	2003–04	7	2	1	0
Incheon United	2004	11	4		
Cerezo Osaka	2004	4	1		
Irtysh Pavlodar	2005	6	1		
Metalurh Zaporizhya	2005–06	10	2	1	1
Al-Ahli	2006–07				
OFK Beograd	2006–07	9	0	0	0
Dalian Shide	2007	16	2	0	0
Yantai Yiteng	2008	22	7		
Pandurii Târgu Jiu	2008–09	5	0	0	0
Internațional Curtea de Argeș	2009–10	1	0	1	0
Brantford Galaxy	2010	19	10	—	
Mladenovac	2011–12	13	0	0	0
Career total		249	55	11	3

== Honours ==
Brantford Galaxy

- Canadian Soccer League: 2010
