= Ranko Golijanin =

Serbian footballer (born 1975)

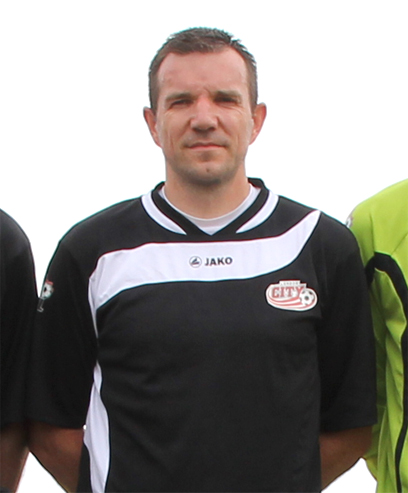
- Golijanin in 2012

Personal information
- Date of birth: 18 January 1975 (age 51)
- Place of birth: Pale, Bosnia and Herzegovina, Yugoslavia
- Height: 1.83 m (6 ft 0 in)
- Position: Forward

Senior career*
Years	Team	Apps	(Gls)
1990–1993	Zemun		
1993–1995	Radnički Kragujevac		
1995–1997	OFK Beograd		
1997–1998	Hércules CF	12	(0)
1998–1999	Radnički Kragujevac	6	(2)
1999–2002	Zemun	16+	(1)
2002	Milwaukee Rampage	8	(4)
2010–2011	Brantford Galaxy	23	(15)
2012	London City	10	(2)
2012	Brantford Galaxy	10	(6)
2013–2015	SC Waterloo	54	(9)

International career
1996	FR Yugoslavia U21	1	(0)

Managerial career
- 2012: Brantford Galaxy (player and assistant coach)
- * Club domestic league appearances and goals

Ranko Golijanin (Serbian Cyrillic: Ранко Голијанин; born 18 January 1975) is a retired professional footballer who played in the First League of FR Yugoslavia, Segunda División, USL A-League, and the Canadian Soccer League.

== Club career ==
After spending most of his career in Serbia with FK Zemun and FK Radnički Kragujevac, he had spells in Spain, with Hércules CF, and at the end of his career, in the United States, with Milwaukee Rampage. In 2010, he went overseas to Canada to sign with Brantford Galaxy SC of the Canadian Soccer League. He made his debut on 23 May 2010 against Toronto Croatia, and recorded his first goal in a 2–1 victory. He helped Brantford clinch a postseason berth by finishing seventh in the overall standings. He netted a hat-trick against Portugal FC in the Semi-final's to book Brantford a spot in the 2010 CSL Championship with a 5–3 victory. He featured in the CSL Championship match against Hamilton Croatia, where he recorded a goal in a 3–0 clinching the club's first championship.

In 2012, he signed with London City. On 1 August 2012 he returned to Brantford in the role of player/assistant coach. In 2013, he was reunited with head coach Lazo Džepina and secured a contract with SC Waterloo Region. During his tenure with Waterloo the club qualified for the playoffs by finishing fifth in the overall standings. He featured in the CSL Championship match against Kingston FC, and won his second championship by a score of 3–1. In 2015, he helped Waterloo reach their second CSL Championship finals, where they faced Toronto Croatia but suffered a 1–0 defeat.

== Honours ==
Milwaukee Rampage

- USL A-League: 2002

Brantford Galaxy

- CSL Championship: 2010

SC Waterloo

- CSL Championship: 2013

== External sources ==
- Ranko Golijanin at BDFutbol
