= Milltown F.C. (Canada) =

Canadian association football team

- Full name: Milltown Football Club
- Nickname: The True FC
- Short name: MFC
- Founded: 2010
- Stadium: Bishop Reding SS
- President: Dino Rossi
- Head coach: Omar Jbaihi
- League: Peel Halton Soccer League
- 2010: Regular season: 4th Play-offs: Quarterfinals
| Home colours | Away colours |

Milltown Football Club is a soccer club based in Milton, Ontario, Canada, playing in Division 1 of the Peel Halton Soccer League. Milltown FC joined the Canadian Soccer League in the 2010 season as an expansion club but opted out of the league after one season due to disagreement over membership terms and conditions.

== History ==
Milltown FC was officially announced as an expansion club in the CSL's 2010 season on February 24, 2010. The home field is at the Bishop Reding School in Milton. On April 3, 2010 Milltown FC and Milton Youth Soccer Club signed an affiliation agreement that will see MYSC supply players for Milltown FC's reserve and youth teams.

Milltown FC, in their inaugural CSL season, was one of four new teams in the 2010 season, representing the town of Milton just west of Toronto, the smallest population of the nine community teams in the CSL. Milltown achieved top position in the standings on the 13th game of the inaugural season for the first time ever on July 24, 2010. The carefully selected team that expected to use the first year to become established in the league, attracted a lot of attention with an undefeated streak under head coach Rafael Carbajal that now extends to nine games going back to June 6.

== Year-by-year ==
| Year | League | Regular season | Playoffs |
|---|---|---|---|
| 2010 | Canadian Soccer League | 4th | Quarter-finalist |
| 2011 | Peel Halton 1st | 1st | |
| 2012 | Peel Halton Premier | 5th | |
