= Lazo Džepina =

Football player (born 1966)

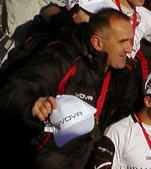
- Džepina in 2010

Personal information
- Full name: Lazo Džepina
- Date of birth: October 27, 1966 (age 60)
- Place of birth: Knin, SR Croatia, SFR Yugoslavia
- Position: Midfielder

Senior career*
| Years | Team | Apps | (Gls) |
| 1985–1990 | Dinara | | |
| 1990–1995 | Rad | | |
| 1996–2000 | Borac Banja Luka | | |
| 2005 | Hamilton Thunder | | |

Managerial career
- 2010: Dinara
- 2010–2011: Brantford Galaxy
- 2011–2016: SC Waterloo Region
- 2022–2024: Dinara
- 2024–: NK Janjevo Kistanje
- * Club domestic league appearances and goals

Lazo Džepina (Serbian Cyrillic: Лазо Џепина; born October 27, 1966) is a Croatian Serb businessman, football manager, and former football player.

His playing career initially began with Dinara, and later in the First League of FR Yugoslavia with Rad. He received his first piece of silverware in the First League of the Republika Srpska with Borac Banja Luka by winning the Republika Srpska Cup. His playing career concluded abroad in 2005 in Canada.

After retiring from professional football, he transitioned to the managerial side by managing his former club Dinara in 2010. After a season in Croatia, he returned to the Canadian circuit to manage Brantford Galaxy, where he led the team to a CSL Championship. In 2011, he was relieved of his coaching duties at Brantford and was involved with the expansion franchise SC Waterloo Region. His involvement with Waterloo included coaching responsibilities and financial shares in the club. He led Waterloo to its first championship title in 2013.

== Club career ==
=== Europe ===
Džepina began his career with his hometown club, Dinara. In 1990, he signed with Rad of the First League of FR Yugoslavia and played with Borac Banja Luka where he won the Republika Srpska Cup.

=== Canada ===
In 2005, Džepina played abroad in the Canadian Professional Soccer League with the Hamilton Thunder. In his debut season in the Canadian circuit, he helped Hamilton secure the divisional title. Their playoff journey concluded in the semifinal round after a defeat by the Oakville Blue Devils.

== Managerial career ==
=== Croatia ===
After he retired from professional football, he managed NK Dinara in 2010.

=== Brantford Galaxy ===
He returned to the Canadian circuit in 2010 to manage the expansion franchise, the Brantford Galaxy in the Canadian Soccer League. In preparation for the 2010 season, Džepina recruited several European players to Brantford. The acquisition of European imports contributed to the club securing a playoff berth by finishing seventh in the league's first division. In the opening round of the post-season, Brantford defeated the Serbian White Eagles in a two-game series. Following their victory over the Serbs, the Galaxy would defeat Portugal FC in the semifinals. Džepina led Brantford to their first championship success by defeating Hamilton Croatia in the finals.

The following season, he continued in the capacity as head coach. However, after a mediocre start to the season, Džepina was dismissed from his post.

=== Waterloo Region ===
In 2012, Kitchener Waterloo United FC was promoted to the CSL's first division, and the team was renamed SC Waterloo Region, with Džepina becoming a shareholder in the organization. The managerial responsibilities were assigned to Džepina, who pursued a policy of European recruitment. In his first season with Waterloo, he failed to secure the final postseason berth by two points. After the conclusion of the season, he was nominated for the league's head coach of the year award.

Džepina would lead Waterloo to a playoff berth in 2013 by finishing fifth in the first division. Their opponents in the opening round of the playoffs were Brampton City United, and they advanced to the next round. In the next round, Waterloo defeated Toronto Croatia in a penalty shootout to qualify for the championship. Waterloo would claim the championship title after defeating Kingston FC. Throughout the 2013 campaign, Džepina also managed Waterloo's reserve team in the league's second division and led the team to the championship title.

In 2014, Waterloo secured another playoff berth by finishing seventh. However, they failed to defend their championship title after an early defeat to Toronto Croatia in the quarterfinal round. Džepina led Waterloo to their third consecutive playoff berth by finishing fourth in the 2015 season. Waterloo reached the championship finals, where they were defeated by the Croats.

=== Croatia ===
Džepina returned to manage his former club, Dinara in 2022 in the Croatian regional circuit. In the early winter of 2024, he left Dinara. After he had departed from Dinara, he was named the manager for NK Janjevo Kistanje.

== Honours ==
=== Player ===
Borac Banja Luka

- Republika Srpska Cup

Hamilton Thunder

- Canadian Professional Soccer League Western Conference: 2005

=== Manager ===
Brantford Galaxy

- CSL Championship: 2010

SC Waterloo Region

- CSL Championship: 2013
- CSL Championship runner-up: 2015

SC Waterloo Region II

- CSL II Championship: 2013
