= Zvonko Bakula =

Bosnian footballer

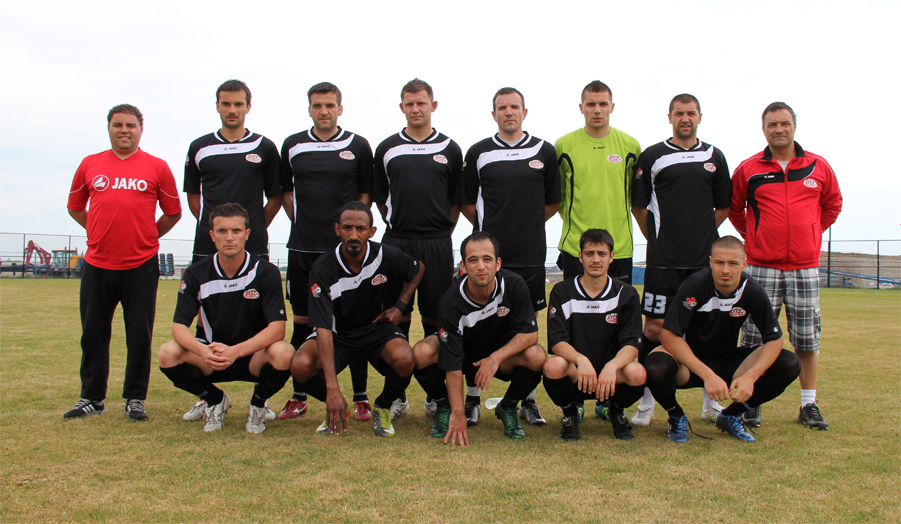
- Bakula in 2012

Personal information
- Date of birth: 20 May 1982 (age 44)
- Place of birth: Mostar, SR Bosnia and Herzegovina, SFR Yugoslavia
- Position: Defender

Senior career*
Years	Team	Apps	(Gls)
2002–2007	Posušje		
2007–2008	Brotnjo		
2008–2009	Posušje	11	(1)
2010–2011	Brantford Galaxy		
2012–2013	London City		
2012–2013	Imotski	5	(0)
2014–2015	Kamen Ivanbegovina	12	(0)
2015–2016	NK Vinjani	11	(0)
- * Club domestic league appearances and goals

Zvonko Bakula (born May 20, 1982) is a former Bosnian footballer who played as a defender.

== Club career ==
=== Bosnia ===
Bakula played in the Premier League of Bosnia and Herzegovina with NK Posusje in the 2002–03 season. He would re-sign with the club the following season. After four consecutive seasons with Posusje, he joined HNK Brotnjo in 2007 to play in the country's second division. He would immediately return to his former club the next season.

=== Canada ===
In the summer of 2010, he was transferred abroad to play in the Canadian Soccer League with the expansion franchise Brantford Galaxy. In his debut season in the inter-provincial league, he assisted Brantford in securing a playoff berth by finishing seventh in the first division. Bakula participated in the opening round of the postseason, where he contributed the winning goal against the Serbian White Eagles in the second match which advanced the club to the next round. In the semi-final round of the tournament, Brantford would eliminate Portugal FC to advance to the championship final. He would appear in the championship final match against Hamilton Croatia where the Galaxy would successfully defeat Hamilton.

Bakula was re-signed by Brantford for the 2011 season. However, the club failed to secure a postseason berth by finishing ninth in the league's first division. After two seasons with Brantford, he signed with league rivals London City for the 2012 campaign. Following the conclusion of the season, he was nominated for the league's top defender award. In 2013, after a brief stint in Europe, he re-signed with London for another season.

=== Croatia ===
In the winter of 2013, he returned to Europe to play in the Croatian second-tier league with NK Imotski where he played in 5 matches. After a short stint with Imotski, he played with NK Kamen Ivanbegovina for the 2014–15 season and appeared in 12 matches. In 2016, he played in the Croatian regional level with NK Vinjani.

== Administrative career ==
In 2023, he returned to his former club Posusje, where he made the transition into the administrative field of football and was named to the club's supervisory board by the board of directors.
