= Šilovo (Lebane) =

Šilovo Шилово (Serbian)
- Village
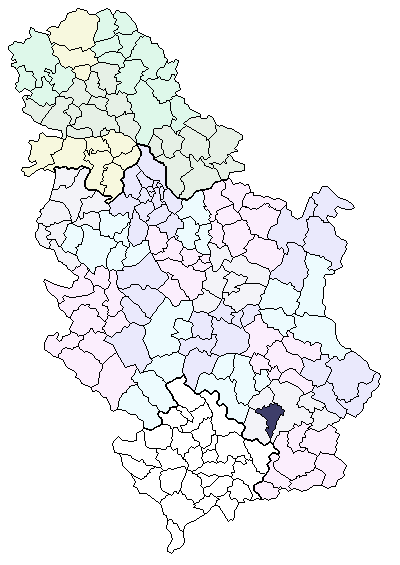
- Location of the municipality of Lebane in Serbia

- Location within Serbia
- Coordinates: 42.9028°N 21.7083°E
- Country: Serbia
- District: Jablanica District
- Municipality: Lebane

Area
  - Total: 0.89 sq mi (2.3 km^{2})

Population (2024)
  - Total: 1,500
  - Density: 1,700/sq mi (650/km^{2})
- Time zone: UTC+1 (CET)
  - Summer (DST): UTC+2 (CEST)
- Postal code: 60000

Šilovo (Serbian Cyrillic: Шилово) is a village in the municipality of Lebane, Serbia. According to the 2024 census, the village has a population of 1500+ people.
